= List of awards and nominations received by Jessica Mauboy =

Jessica Mauboy awards and nominations
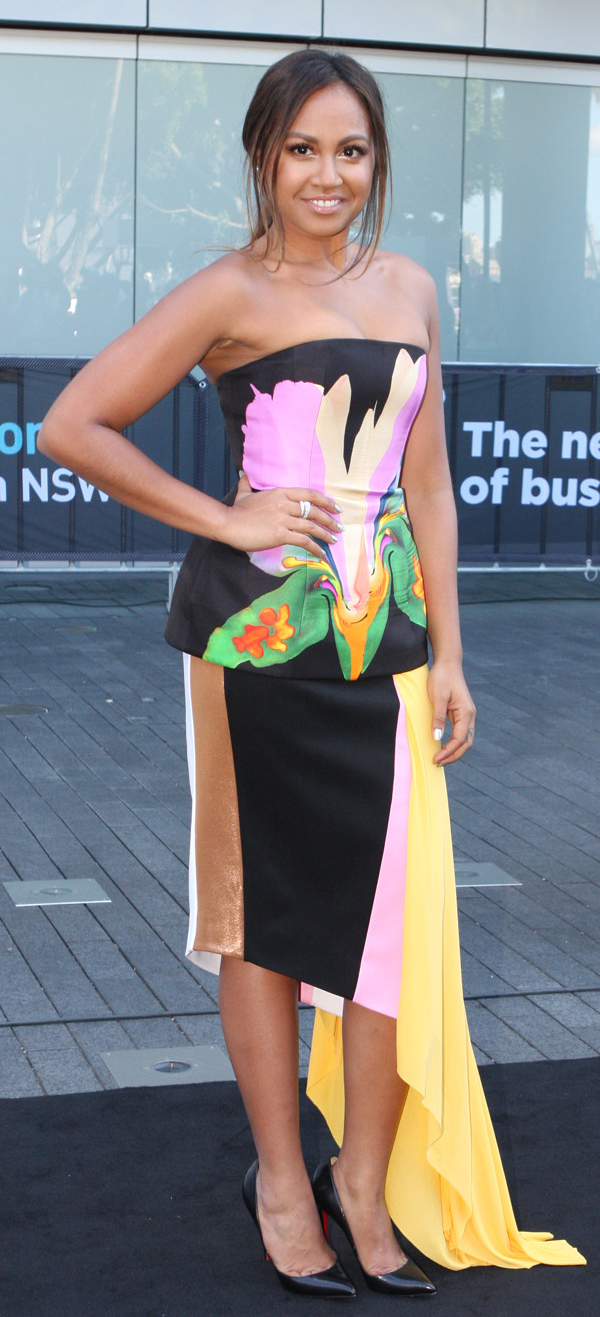
- Mauboy at the ARIA Music Awards of 2013, Star Event Centre, Sydney, December 2013.
Award	Wins / Honors	Nominations
AACTA Awards	1	1
APRA Awards	1	5
ARIA Music Awards	3	31
MTV Australia Awards	1	2
MTV Europe Music Awards	1	1
Nickelodeon Australian Kids' Choice Awards	2	5

Jessica Mauboy is an Australian recording artist, who became the runner-up for the fourth season of Australian Idol in 2006. She subsequently a recording contract Sony Music Australia, and released her debut album, The Journey, in February 2007. Mauboy has since released four studio albums, Been Waiting (2008), Get 'Em Girls (2010), Beautiful (2013) and Hilda (2019). Mauboy has won numerous awards, including an AACTA Award, APRA Award, Australian of the Year Award, MTV Australia Award, MTV Europe Music Award, three ARIA Music Awards, two Nickelodeon Australian Kids' Choice Awards, three NT Indigenous Music Awards, two NT Young Achiever Awards and nine Deadly Awards. Overall, she has won 40 awards from 108 nominations.

== Music ==
=== AIR Awards ===
The Australian Independent Record Awards (commonly known informally as AIR Awards) is an annual awards night to recognise, promote and celebrate the success of Australia's Independent Music sector.

Year	Nominee / work	Award	Result	Ref.
2025	"Won't Stop" 3% (featuring Jessica Mauboy)	Independent Music Video of the Year	Won	

=== APRA Awards ===
The APRA Awards are held in Australia and New Zealand by the Australasian Performing Right Association to recognise songwriting skills, sales and airplay performance by its members annually. Mauboy has won one award from four nominations.

Year	Nominee / work	Award	Result	Ref.
2009	"Running Back" (featuring Flo Rida)	Urban Work of the Year	Won	
2010	Herself	Breakthrough Songwriter of the Year	Nominated	
2010	"Been Waiting"	Most Played Australian Work	Nominated	
2010	"Running Back" (featuring Flo Rida)	Urban Work of the Year	Nominated	
2020	"Little Things"	Song of the Year	Shortlisted	
2021	"Selfish"	Most Performed Pop Work	Nominated	
2022	"First Nation" (Midnight Oil featuring Jessica Mauboy and Tasman Keith)	Song of the Year	Nominated	
2023	"Glow""	Most Performed Pop Work of the Year	Nominated	
2024	"Give You Love" (featuring Jason Derulo)	Song of the Year	Shortlisted	
2025	"Won't Stop" (3% featuring Jessica Mauboy) (Danzal Baker, Andrew Burford, Madeline Crabtree, Corey Webster, Dallas Woods)	Song of the Year	Nominated	
2025	"Give You Love" (featuring Jason Derulo)	Most Performed Australian Work	Nominated	
2025	"Give You Love" (featuring Jason Derulo)	Most Performed Pop Work	Nominated	
2026	"While I Got Time" (Mauboy / PJ Harding)	Song of the Year	Shortlisted	

=== ARIA Music Awards ===
The ARIA Music Awards is an annual awards ceremony that recognises excellence, innovation, and achievement across all genres of Australian music. Mauboy has won two awards from 31 nominations.

Year	Nominee / work	Award	Result
2009	"Running Back" (featuring Flo Rida)	Highest Selling Single	Won
2009	"Burn"	Highest Selling Single	Nominated
2009	Been Waiting	Highest Selling Album	Nominated
2009	Been Waiting	Best Pop Release	Nominated
2009	Been Waiting	Breakthrough Artist – Album	Nominated
2009	"Running Back" (featuring Flo Rida)	Breakthrough Artist – Single	Nominated
2009	Been Waiting	Best Female Artist	Nominated
2011	"Saturday Night" (featuring Ludacris)	Highest Selling Single	Nominated
2011	Jessica Mauboy	Most Popular Australian Artist	Nominated
2012	"Gotcha"	Best Female Artist	Nominated
2012	"Gotcha"	Best Pop Release	Nominated
2012	"Galaxy" (featuring Stan Walker)	Song of the Year	Nominated
2013	"To the End of the Earth"	Best Female Artist	Won
2014	Beautiful	Album of the Year	Nominated
2014	Beautiful	Best Female Artist	Nominated
2014	"Never Be the Same"	Best Video	Nominated
2015	"Can I Get a Moment?"	Best Female Artist	Nominated
2016	"This Ain't Love"	Best Female Artist	Nominated
2017	The Secret Daughter: Songs from the Original TV Series	Best Female Artist	Nominated
2017	The Secret Daughter: Songs from the Original TV Series	Best Original Soundtrack or Musical Theatre Cast Album	Nominated
2017	"Fallin'"	Song of the Year	Nominated
2017	"Fallin'"	Best Pop Release	Nominated
2017	"Fallin'"	Best Video	Nominated
2017	All The Hits Live Tour	Best Australian Live Act	Nominated
2018	The Secret Daughter Season Two: Songs from the Original 7 Series	Best Original Soundtrack or Musical Theatre Cast Album	Nominated
2019	"Little Things"	Best Female Artist	Nominated
2019	"Little Things"	Best Video	Nominated
2020	Hilda	Album of the Year	Nominated
2020	Hilda	Best Cover Art	Nominated
2020	Hilda	Producer of the Year	Nominated
2023	Joel Rasmussen and Rowena Rasmussen for Jessica Mauboy – "Give You Love" (featuring Jason Derulo)	Best Video	Nominated
2024	Yours Forever	Best Pop Release	Nominated
2024	"Give You Love" (featuring Jason Derulo)	Song of the Year	Nominated

=== Australian Women in Music Awards ===
The Australian Women in Music Awards is an annual event that celebrates outstanding women in the Australian Music Industry who have made significant and lasting contributions in their chosen field. They commenced in 2018.

Year	Nominee / work	Award	Result	Ref.
2023	Jessica Mauboy	Artistic Excellence Award	Nominated	

=== Channel [V] Awards ===
The Channel V Oz Artist of the Year award is presented annually by Channel V Australia. Mauboy has been nominated four times.

Year	Nominee / work	Award	Result
2011	Herself	[V] Oz Artist of the Year	Nominated
2012	Herself	[V] Oz Artist of the Year	Nominated
2013	Herself	[V] Oz Artist of the Year	Nominated
2014	Herself	[V] Oz Artist of the Year	Nominated

=== Cosmopolitan Fun, Fearless, Female Awards ===
The Cosmopolitan Fun, Fearless, Female Awards is an annual awards show presented by Cosmopolitan magazine to celebrate Australian women in television, music, sport and radio. Mauboy has won three awards from four nominations.

Year	Nominee / work	Award	Result
2009	Herself	Favourite Singer	Won
2011	Herself	Most Inspirational Singer	Won
2013	Herself	Singer	Won
2014	Herself	Singer	Nominated

=== Country Music Awards (CMAA) ===
The Country Music Awards of Australia (CMAA) (also known as the Golden Guitar Awards) is an annual awards night held in January during the Tamworth Country Music Festival, celebrating recording excellence in the Australian country music industry. They have been held annually since 1973.

Year	Nominee / work	Award	Result
2016	"Spirit of the Anzacs" (with Lee Kernaghan, Guy Sebastian, Sheppard, Jon Stevens, Shannon Noll and Megan Washington)	Vocal Collaboration of the Year	Won
2016	"Spirit of the Anzacs" (with Lee Kernaghan, Guy Sebastian, Sheppard, Jon Stevens, Shannon Noll and Megan Washington)	Video clip of the Year	Won

=== Deadly Awards ===
The Deadly Awards is an annual celebration of Aboriginal and Torres Strait Islander achievements in music, sport, entertainment and community. Mauboy has won ten awards from eleven nominations.

Year	Nominee / work	Award	Result
2007	Herself	Artist of the Year	Won
2009	"Burn"	Single Release of the Year	Won
2009	Been Waiting	Album of the Year	Won
2009	Herself	Female Artist of the Year	Won
2011	Herself	Female Artist of the Year	Won
2012	Herself	Female Artist of the Year	Won
2012	"Galaxy" (featuring Stan Walker)	Single of the Year	Won
2013	Herself	Female Artist of the Year	Won
2013	"Something's Got a Hold on Me"	Single Release of the Year	Won
2013	"Gotcha"	APRA Song of the Year	Won

=== J Awards ===
The J Awards are an annual series of Australian music awards that were established by the Australian Broadcasting Corporation's youth-focused radio station Triple J. They commenced in 2005.

Year	Nominee / work	Award	Result	Ref.
2024	"Won't Stop" (3% featuring Jessica Mauboy); Directed by Nick Rae, Jordan Ruyi Blanch	Australian Video of the Year	Nominated	

=== MTV Australia Awards ===
The MTV Australia Awards was an awards ceremony presented by channel MTV Australia that honoured the best music videos of both local and international acts. Mauboy won one award from two nominations.

Year	Nominee / work	Award	Result
2009	"Running Back" (featuring Flo Rida)	Best Collaboration	Nominated
2009	Herself	Best Aussie	Won

=== MTV Europe Music Awards ===
The MTV Europe Music Awards is an awards ceremony presented by MTV Europe to honour the best music videos of both European and international acts. Mauboy has received one nomination.

Year	Nominee / work	Award	Result
2017	Herself	Best Australian Act	Won

=== National Indigenous Music Awards ===
The National Indigenous Music Awards is an annual awards ceremony that recognises the achievements of Indigenous Australians in music. Mauboy has won six awards from twenty five nominations. She was inducted into the Hall of Fame in 2025.

Year	Nominee / work	Award	Result	Ref.
2007	Herself	Act of the Year	Won	
2009	Herself	Act of the Year	Nominated	
2009	Been Waiting	Album of the Year	Won	
2009	Running Back	Song of the Year	Won	
2010	Herself	Act of the Year	Nominated	
2011	Herself	Act of the Year	Nominated	
2011	Get 'Em Girls	Album of the Year	Nominated	
2012	Herself	National Artist of the Year	Nominated	
2013	Herself	National Artist of the Year	Won	
2014	Herself	National Artist of the Year	Won	
2015	Herself	National Artist of the Year	Won	
2017	Herself	National Artist of the Year	Nominated	
2018	Herself	Act of the Year	Nominated	
2018	"We Got Love"	Film Clip of the Year	Nominated	
2019	Herself	National Artist of the Year	Nominated	
2020	Herself	Act of the Year	Nominated	
2020	Hilda	Album of the Year	Nominated	
2021	Herself	Artist of the Year	Nominated	
2022	Herself	Artist of the Year	Nominated	
2022	"Automatic"	Film Clip of the Year	Nominated	
2023	Herself	Artist of the Year	Nominated	
2024	Yours Forever	Album of the Year	Nominated	
2025	Jessica Mauboy	Artist of the Year	Nominated	
2025	"Won't Stop" (with 3%)	Song of the Year	Nominated	
2025	"Won't Stop" (with 3%)	Film Clip of the Year	Nominated	
2025	Jessica Mauboy	Hall of Fame	inducted	

=== Nickelodeon Australian Kids' Choice Awards ===
The Nickelodeon Australian Kids' Choice Awards is an annual awards show that honours the year's biggest television, movie and music acts, as voted by the public. Mauboy has won two awards from five nominations.

Year	Nominee / work	Award	Result
2008	Herself	So Hot Right Now	Nominated
2009	Herself	Fave Aussie Singer	Won
2009	Herself	Fave Aussie	Nominated
2010	Herself	Fave Aussie Musos	Won
2011	Herself	Fave Aussie Musos	Nominated

=== Nickelodeon US Kids' Choice Awards ===
The Nickelodeon US Kids' Choice Awards is an annual awards show that honours the year's biggest television, movie and music acts, as voted by the public. Mauboy has been nominated once for the US version of the award ceremony.

Year	Nominee / work	Award	Result
2016	Herself	Favourite Pop Sensation	Nominated
2018	Herself	Favourite Aussie/Kiwi Streaming Sensation	Nominated

=== NT Indigenous Music Awards ===
The NT Indigenous Music Awards recognises excellence, dedication, innovation and outstanding contribution to the Northern Territory music industry. Mauboy has won three awards from five nominations.

Year	Nominee / work	Award	Result
2007	Herself	Act of the Year	Won
2009	Herself	Act of the Year	Nominated
2009	Been Waiting	Album of the Year	Won
2009	"Running Back" (featuring Flo Rida)	Single Release of the Year	Won
2010	Herself	Act of the Year	Nominated

=== NT Young Achiever Awards ===
The purpose of the Northern Territory Young Achiever Awards is to acknowledge, encourage and most importantly promote the positive achievements of young Territorians up to and including 29 years of age as of 31 December each year. Jessica Mauboy was announced as winner of the Charles Darwin Arts Award category in 2004 and 2007.

Year	Nominee	Award	Result
2004	Herself	Charles Darwin University Arts Award	Won
2007	Herself	Charles Darwin University Arts Award	Won

=== PopRepublic.tv Awards ===
PopRepublic.tv is an Australian online entertainment magazine. Nominees for their annual awards are selected by the magazine, and winners are decided by public vote. Mauboy has won six awards from 14 nominations.

Year	Nominee / work	Award	Result
2010	Herself	Australian Female Artist	Won
2010	"Saturday Night" (featuring Ludacris)	Single of 2010	Nominated
2010	Get 'Em Girls	Album of 2010	Won
2011	Herself	Australian Female Artist	Nominated
2011	"Galaxy" (featuring Stan Walker)	Single of 2011	Nominated
2012	Herself	Favourite Australian Female Artist	Nominated
2013	Herself	Favourite Australian Female Artist	Won
2013	Beautiful	Favourite Album of 2013	Nominated
2013	To the End of the Earth Tour	Favourite Concert Tour of 2013	Nominated
2014	Herself	Favourite Australian Female Artist	Won
2014	"Can I Get a Moment?"	Favourite Single	Won
2015	"This Ain't Love"	Favourite Single	Won
2016	Herself	Favourite Australian Female Artist	Nominated
2016	The Secret Daughter: Songs from the Original TV Series	Favourite Album	Nominated

=== World Music Awards ===
The World Music Awards is an international awards show that was established in 1989 to honour musicians based on their worldwide sales figures, which are provided by the International Federation of the Phonographic Industry (IFPI). Mauboy has received seven nominations.

Year	Nominee / work	Award	Result
2014	Herself	World's Best Female Artist	Nominated
2014	Herself	World's Best Live Act	Nominated
2014	Herself	World's Best Entertainer of the Year	Nominated
2014	Beautiful	World's Best Album	Nominated
2014	"To the End of the Earth"	World's Best Song	Nominated
2014	"Pop a Bottle (Fill Me Up)"	World's Best Song	Nominated
2014	"Pop a Bottle (Fill Me Up)"	World's Best Video	Nominated

== Film and television ==
=== AACTA Awards ===
The AACTA Awards are presented annually by the Australian Academy of Cinema and Television Arts (AACTA), to recognise excellence in the Australian film and television industries. Mauboy won her first AACTA Award for Best Actress in a Supporting Role.

Year	Nominee / work	Award	Result
2013	The Sapphires	Best Actress in a Supporting Role	Won

=== AFCA Awards ===
The AFCA Awards are presented annually by the Australian Film Critics Association (AFCA), to recognise excellence in Australian and international films. Mauboy won her first AFCA Award for Best Actress in a Supporting Role.

Year	Nominee / work	Award	Result
2013	The Sapphires	Best Actress in a Supporting Role	Won

=== Deadly Awards ===
Year	Nominee / work	Award	Result
2010	Bran Nue Dae	Female Actress of the Year	Nominated

=== FCCA Awards ===
The FCCA Awards are presented annually by the Film Critics Circle of Australia (FCCA), to recognise excellence in Australian films and documentaries. Mauboy received her first nomination for Best Actress in a Supporting Role.

Year	Nominee / work	Award	Result
2012	The Sapphires	Best Actress in a Supporting Role	Nominated

=== Logie Awards ===
The Logie Awards is presented annually by TV Week magazine to recognise excellence in Australian television. Mauboy has been nominated once.

Year	Nominee / work	Award	Result
2017	The Secret Daughter	Best Actress	Nominated

== Other ==
=== Australian of the Year Awards ===
The Australian of the Year Awards are presented annually by the National Australia Day Council (NADC), to recognise Australians for their achievements and ongoing contribution to the Australian community and nation. Mauboy has won one award from two nominations.

Year	Nominee / work	Award	Result
2010	Herself	Young Australian of the Year	Nominated
2013	Herself	Young Australian of the Year	Nominated
2013	Herself	Northern Territory Young Australian of the Year	Won

=== InStyle Women of Style Awards ===
Year	Nominee / work	Award	Result
2014	Herself	Entertainment Award	Won
2014	Herself	Readers' Choice	Won
