= All the Hits Live (Jessica Mauboy) =

2017 concert tour by Jessica Mauboy

All the Hits Tour
- Tour by Jessica Mauboy
- Promotional poster for the tour
- Start date: 30 March 2017
- End date: 15 April 2017
- Legs: 1
- No. of shows: 8 in Australia; 8 Total

Jessica Mauboy concert chronology
- To the End of the Earth Tour (2013–2014); All the Hits Live Tour (2017)

All the Hits Live Tour is the third concert tour by Australian recording artist Jessica Mauboy. The tour visited venues in Adelaide, Canberra, Brisbane, Darwin, the Gold Coast, Melbourne, Newcastle and Sydney and included tracks from the album The Secret Daughter: Songs from the Original TV Series as well as hits from her 10-year catalogue.

The tour was recorded from Sydney's ICC Theatre in April and edited into a 90-minute special. It was premiered on Foxtel on 21 July 2017. It was released on DVD and Blu-ray in October 2017.

== Critical reception ==
auspOp said "What impressed us most about the All The Hits Live tour was Jessica’s ability to transcend genres – dance, pop, urban, soul, country – so effortlessly and flawlessly." adding "We came away seriously impressed from a show that showcased an Aussie talent’s vocal, moves, performance and back catalogue of pop gems."

Cameron Adams from news.com.au said "Her genre-hopping is relentless and refreshing, literally from country twanger to club banger in a space of a few minutes. Her band (complete with brass section) follow her deftly through the musical time travelling" adding "This tour ... demonstrates how hard work and deep talent can be a deadly combination."

== Opening acts ==
- Isaiah Firebrace

== Set list ==
This is the DVD/Blu-Ray release track listing.

1. "Can I Get a Moment?"
2. "Saturday Night"
3. "Better Be Home Soon"
4. "Flame Trees"
5. "Get 'Em Girls" / "Handle It"
6. "Running Back"
7. "Words"
8. "Land of 1000 Dances"
9. "I Can't Help Myself"
10. "Gotcha"
11. "Risk It"
12. "Galaxy"
13. "Burn"
14. "Pop a Bottle (Fill Me Up)"

== Tour dates ==
Date	City	Venue
30 March 2017	Newcastle	Newcastle Entertainment Centre
1 April 2017	Melbourne	Margaret Court Arena
5 April 2017	Adelaide	Adelaide Entertainment Centre
7 April 2017	Sydney	International Convention Centre Sydney
8 April 2017	Canberra	Royal Theatre
10 April 2017	Brisbane	Brisbane Convention & Exhibition Centre
11 April 2017	Gold Coast	Jupiters Theatre
15 April 2017	Darwin	Darwin Entertainment Centre

== Charts ==
=== Weekly charts ===
Chart (2017)	Peak position
Australian Audiovisual Chart (ARIA Charts)	2

=== Year-end charts ===
Chart (2017)	Peak position
Australian Audiovisual Chart (ARIA Charts)	32

== Release history ==
Country	Date	Format	Label	Catalogue
Australia	6 October 2017	DVD	Sony Music Australia	88985482349

== Personnel ==
- Parade Artist Management - Management
- Rachael Johnston - Design, Film Editor
- Ivan Ordenes - Sound Engineer

=== Band ===
- Dugald McAndrew - Drums, Keyboard
