= ITunes Session (Jessica Mauboy EP) =

iTunes Session

EP by Jessica Mauboy
- Released: 18 July 2014
- Recorded: 301 Studios (Sydney, New South Wales)
- Length: 25:31
- Label: Sony

Jessica Mauboy chronology
Beautiful (2013)	iTunes Session (2014)	The Secret Daughter: Songs from the Original TV Series (2016)

iTunes Session is the first extended play (EP) by Australian recording artist Jessica Mauboy, released through Sony Music Australia on 18 July 2014. The seven-track EP was recorded in one take at 301 Studios in Sydney. It features rearranged live versions of Mauboy's singles "Running Back", "Burn", "Inescapable", "Pop a Bottle (Fill Me Up)" and "Never Be the Same", as well as live cover versions of "Who's Loving You" by The Miracles and "Thinkin Bout You" by Frank Ocean. Upon its release, iTunes Session debuted at number 25 on the ARIA Albums Chart.

== Background and promotion ==
In June 2014, it was announced that Mauboy would be releasing an iTunes Session extended play (EP) exclusively on the iTunes Store. She said of the EP's release, "I am thrilled to record my first iTunes Session to deliver something really special and unique for all my fans worldwide on iTunes." iTunes Session was recorded live in one take with a full band at 301 Studios in Sydney. In an interview for InStyle magazine, Mauboy revealed that she channeled Mariah Carey on the EP, saying: "Everyone knows I'm a Mariah fan and I've drawn a lot of inspiration from watching and listening to her live performances." She also added that Carey's live version of The Jackson 5's "I'll Be There" had "a vocal rawness" in it that she wanted to showcase on the EP. It was noted that the EP would see Mauboy join the likes of Bernard Fanning, The Black Keys, Emeli Sandé, Kelly Clarkson and Lykke Li who have also released iTunes Session EPs in the past.

"On this EP I worked really closely with my music team to create a live vibe that's very different to the studio versions which are so produced and fine tuned. It was an organic process where we all worked off each other in the same place at the same time–it's very raw and very real."

— Mauboy talking to InStyle magazine about the development of the EP.

The seven-track EP was released on 18 July 2014. It contains rearranged live versions of Mauboy's hit singles "Running Back", "Burn", "Inescapable", "Pop a Bottle (Fill Me Up)" and "Never Be the Same", as well as live cover versions of The Miracles' "Who's Loving You" and Frank Ocean's "Thinkin Bout You". In an interview for Spotlight Report, Mauboy stated that she chose to record "Thinkin Bout You" because she "felt really connected" to the song and was amazed by how "musically intelligent" Ocean is. As part of the promotion for iTunes Session, Mauboy performed on The Dan & Maz Show (15 July 2014) and Today (22 July 2014). To coincide with the EP's release, she took over as the radio host for Nova FM on 20 July 2014 from 1.00pm to 3:00pm.

== Reception ==
Marcus Floyd from Renowned for Sound gave iTunes Session four-and-a-half out of five stars and praised Mauboy's vocals on "Inescapable", "Burn", "Never Be the Same" and "Who's Loving You". He also described the whole arrangement on "Running Back" as "genius" and noted that Mauboy "tackles Frank Ocean's 'Thinkin Bout You' with more justice than the original." Floyd called the EP "a masterpiece" and wrote that the songs "shine bright and give listeners a familiar listening experience in unfamiliar territory." For the issue dated 28 July 2014, iTunes Session debuted at number 25 on the ARIA Albums Chart and became the second highest new entry that week. The EP fell out of the chart's top one hundred the following week.

== Track listing ==
No.	Title	Writer(s)	Length
1.	"Inescapable"	Diane Warren	3:30
2.	"Burn"	Taj Jackson; Jonas Jeberg; Mich Hansen	2:54
3.	"Never Be the Same"	Jessica Mauboy; Anthony Egizii; David Musumeci	3:51
4.	"Running Back"	Mauboy; Audius Mtawarira; Sean Ray Mullins	4:02
5.	"Who's Loving You"	William Robinson	3:37
6.	"Thinkin Bout You"	Christopher Francis Ocean	3:50
7.	"Pop a Bottle (Fill Me Up)"	Mauboy; Mario Marchetti; Gino Barletta; Rebecca Johnson	3:47
Total length:			25:31

== Charts ==
Chart (2014)	Peak position
Australian Albums (ARIA)	25

== Release history ==
Region	Date	Format	Label
Australia	18 July 2014	Digital download	Sony Music Australia
