= Can I Get a Moment? =

Single by Jessica Mauboy

from the album Beautiful: Platinum Edition
- Released: 17 October 2014
- Recorded: Brandon's Way Recording Studios (Los Angeles, California, United States)
- Genre: Funk; soul
- Length: 3:25
- Label: Sony
- Songwriters: Antonio Dixon; Kenneth "Babyface" Edmonds; Khristopher Riddick-Tynes; Carmen Reece; Leon Thomas III; Helen Jane Culver
- Producers: Kenneth "Babyface" Edmonds; Antonio Dixon; The Rascals

Jessica Mauboy singles chronology
"I Believe – Anything Is Possible" (2014)	"Can I Get a Moment?" (2014)	"Spirit of the Anzacs" (2015)

Music video
- "Can I Get a Moment?" on YouTube

"Can I Get a Moment?" is a song recorded by Australian singer Jessica Mauboy for the platinum edition of her third studio album, Beautiful. It was released on 17 October 2014 as the album's fifth overall single and the first single from the platinum edition. "Can I Get a Moment?" was written by Antonio Dixon, Kenneth "Babyface" Edmonds, Khristopher Riddick-Tynes, Carmen Reece, Leon Thomas III and Helen Jane Culver. Production of the song was helmed by Edmonds, Dixon and The Rascals. Musically, "Can I Get a Moment?" is an up-tempo funk and soul song that consists of a percussion, horns, "chunky beats" and handclaps. Upon its release, the song received positive reviews from various publications, who praised its production and Mauboy's vocal performance.

"Can I Get a Moment?" debuted at number five on the ARIA Singles Chart and became her eighth top-ten single. It was certified platinum by the Australian Recording Industry Association for sales exceeding 70,000 copies. The accompanying music video was directed by Stu Gosling and filmed at Crown casino in Melbourne. It features various shots of Mauboy in several outfits, singing the song's lyrics in different sets and in front of different coloured backgrounds. The video received positive feedback from critics, who compared it to Beyoncé's video for "Love on Top" (2011) and noted that Mauboy was channeling Mariah Carey. However, the video received mixed opinions from fans, who complained about Mauboy's outfits and the video's budget. She promoted the song with interviews and performances on television and radio programs.

== Background and release ==
"Can I Get a Moment?" was written by Antonio Dixon, Kenneth "Babyface" Edmonds, Khristopher Riddick-Tynes, Carmen Reece, Leon Thomas III and Helen Jane Culver. It was produced by Edmonds, Dixon and The Rascals. Mauboy was gifted the song by Edmonds after she was given the rare opportunity to write and work with him in Los Angeles in September 2014. On working with Edmonds, Mauboy said: "Working with someone like him is something I have always dreamt with and we had had three good writing sessions when he played me 'Can I Get a Moment?'. It's so funky and cool that as soon as I heard it I told them 'This is my track!'"

On 28 September 2014, it was announced that "Can I Get a Moment?" would be released as Mauboy's next single. The song was then made available to pre-order the following day. An audio teaser of "Can I Get a Moment?" was uploaded to Mauboy's Vevo account on 30 September 2014. The song was released both digitally and physically on 17 October 2014, as the fifth overall single from Mauboy's third studio album, Beautiful, and the first single from the album's platinum edition. The physical release features a Carl remix of the album's fourth single "Never Be the Same". An acoustic version of "Can I Get a Moment?" was released digitally on 13 March 2015.

== Composition ==
"Can I Get a Moment?" is an up-tempo funk and soul song with a duration of three minutes and twenty-five seconds. Its instrumentation consists of a percussion, horns, "chunky beats" and handclaps. Naomi Janes of Renowned for Sound noted that "Can I Get a Moment?" features "'Blurred Lines' style backing vocals" and compared Mauboy's vocals to Christina Aguilera. Mike Wass of Idolator wrote that the song "sounds like a winning mix of B'Day-era Beyoncé and Jessie J's 'Bang Bang'", while Kathy McCabe of News.com.au felt it was reminiscent of Pharrell Williams' "Come Get It Bae". "Can I Get a Moment?" opens with a purring vocal style by Mauboy as she sings: "Too hot to touch, I'm burnin' up, Have you heard the news? I'm on the move". In the chorus, Mauboy sings: "No disrespect, I'm not impressed, right now I'm doing me. You do the most, you're way too close, it's hard for me to breathe! Can I get a moment?". In an interview with The Daily Telegraph, Mauboy described the song as "sexy" and "sassy" and said "it is about being in a really great place, my head is clear and I am just having a moment and I'm celebrating that moment".

== Reception ==
Naomi Janes of Renowned for Sound awarded "Can I Get a Moment?" three stars out of five and called it a "catchy" track that "is a fresh and new sound" for Mauboy. Janes also praised Mauboy's "impressive vocals", noting that it is "the most redeeming feature" on "Can I Get a Moment?". Mike Wass of Idolator wrote that the song "sounds like an on-trend, percussion-heavy club-banger", while Take 40 Australia described it as a "sassy new anthem" and "certified bop". "Can I Get a Moment?" earned Mauboy a nomination for Best Female Artist at the 2015 ARIA Music Awards.

For the issue dated 27 October 2014, "Can I Get a Moment?" debuted at number five on the ARIA Singles Chart and became Mauboy's eighth top-ten single, fifth top-five single and her third top-ten debut. It also became the third top-ten single from Beautiful, following "Pop a Bottle (Fill Me Up)" and "Never Be the Same". The song spent its first two weeks in the top-ten. "Can I Get a Moment?" was certified platinum by the Australian Recording Industry Association for sales exceeding 70,000 copies.

== Music video ==
=== Background and synopsis ===
The music video was directed by Stu Gosling and filmed at Crown Melbourne. It premiered on Mauboy's Vevo account on 29 October 2014. A first look at the video was shown on Sunrise earlier that day. The video opens with a close-up shot of Mauboy who appears in front of a gold background. She is then seen performing on stage with her band, while wearing a black form-fitted jumpsuit with a diamond choker necklace. This is intercut with scenes of Mauboy wearing a green cut-out dress and singing in front of a blue background.> The video then shows Mauboy and her two female backup singers sitting in a dark room, while wearing black pantsuits. This is followed by scenes of Mauboy singing in front of the gold background, while split screen and mirrored shots of men from her band playing instruments are shown. The video then returns to Mauboy performing on stage with her band. This is intercut with mirrored shots of Mauboy and her backup singers, singing in front of a black and white background. Scenes from throughout the video are then intercut with each other. The video ends with Mauboy posing to the camera.

=== Reception ===
Idolator's Mike Wass called it a "cute (but familiar) video" and noted that it drew inspiration from Beyoncé's "Love on Top" video, writing "It's hardly surprising given [Mauboy's] love for all things Queen Bey and the format fits the song perfectly". Natalie Miller of Nova noted that Mauboy channeled "a bit of Mariah 'diva' Carey attitude" in the clip. Chris Urankar of InStyle magazine also thought that Mauboy channeled Carey, noting that she unleashed "a little of her inner diva".

The video received mixed opinions from fans on YouTube and Twitter, complaining about everything from Mauboy's outfits to the budget of the clip. One fan said "the video looks like it cost $2", while another fan noted "All her outfits were not very flattering of her figure. This to me is her worst video". Adam Bub of MusicFix defended the video, writing "What's the fuss all about? There's no twerking, boozing or gratuitous body shots like other pop stars' clips... but does that make it a boring watch? Jess' music videos do tend to err on the safe side, but there's nothing wrong with that either."

== Promotion ==
Mauboy promoted "Can I Get a Moment?" with radio interviews on Smallzy's Surgery (3 October 2014), Fitzy & Wippa (23 October 2014) and Joy 94.9 (31 October 2014). On 20 October 2014, she performed the song during the grand final live decider show of the sixth series of The X Factor Australia. For the performance, Mauboy wore a gold outfit covered in tassels and performed in front of a background of honeycomb patterns. Similarly, Take 40 Australia wrote that they loved "the sassy Beyoncé-style" choreography. Annabel Ross of the Sydney Morning Herald described Mauboy's performance as "vivacious".

Mauboy also performed "Can I Get a Moment?" on Sunrise (22 October 2014) and at Sony Foundation's Wharf4Ward fundraiser in Sydney (23 October 2014). On 26 November 2014, she performed the song at the 2014 ARIA Music Awards. On 4 December 2014, Mauboy performed "Can I Get a Moment?" at the Sydney Opera House in a lemon dress to launch the 2015 Australia Day celebrations. She also performed "Can I Get a Moment?" at iHeartRadio's first Ultimate Pool Party at the Ivy Pool Club in Sydney on 6 December 2014.

== Track listing ==
- Digital download
1. "Can I Get a Moment?" – 3:25
- Digital download
1. "Can I Get a Moment?" (Acoustic version) – 3:20
- CD
1. "Can I Get a Moment?" – 3:25
2. "Never Be the Same" (Acoustic remix) – 3:51

== Credits and personnel ==
Locations

- Recorded at Brandon's Way Recording Studios in Los Angeles, California.
- Mastered at Studios 301 in Sydney.

Personnel

- Songwriting – Antonio Dixon, Kenneth "Babyface" Edmonds, Khristopher Riddick-Tynes, Carmen Reece, Leon Thomas III, Helen Jane Culver
- Production – Kenneth "Babyface" Edmonds, Antonio Dixon, The Rascals
- Recording and mixing engineer – Paul Boutin
- Horns – Randy Ellis, Miguel Costa, Garrett Smith, Raymond Monteiro
- Additional engineering – Adrian Breakspear
- Mastering – Leon Zervos

== Charts ==
=== Weekly chart ===
Chart (2014)	Peak position
Australia (ARIA)	5

=== Year-end chart ===
Chart (2014)	Rank
Australian Artist Singles Chart	20

== Certifications ==
Region	Certification	Certified units/sales
Australia (ARIA)	Platinum	70,000^{^}
^{^} Shipments figures based on certification alone.

== Release history ==
Country	Date	Format	Version(s)	Label
Australia	14 October 2014	Digital download	Main version	Sony
Australia	17 October 2014	CD	Main version	Sony
Australia	13 March 2015	Digital download	Acoustic version	Sony
