= All the Hits Live =

All the Hits Live may refer to:

- All the Hits Live (album), 2015 by James Reyne
- All the Hits Live (Jessica Mauboy), a 2017 concert tour by Jessica Mauboy
- All the Hits Live (Enrique Iglesias), a 2018 concert tour by Enrique Iglesias
