= Beautiful (Jessica Mauboy album) =

Studio album by Jessica Mauboy
- Released: 4 October 2013
- Genres: Pop; dance; R&B
- Length: 46:18
- Label: Sony
- Producers: Ben Berger; DNA; Mike Daley; Antonio Dixon; Kenneth "Babyface" Edmonds; The Fliptones; J Remy; Dante Jones; Brian Kennedy; Mario Marchetti; Harvey Mason, Jr.; Ryan McMahon; Paro; Jonny Perkins; The Rascals; Adam Reily; Louis Schoorl; The Underdogs

Jessica Mauboy chronology
The Sapphires: Original Motion Picture Soundtrack (2012)	Beautiful (2013)	iTunes Session (2014)

Alternative cover
- Platinum edition cover artwork

Singles from Beautiful
- 1. "To the End of the Earth" Released: 17 July 2013; 2. "Pop a Bottle (Fill Me Up)" Released: 27 September 2013; 3. "Beautiful" Released: 22 November 2013; 4. "Never Be the Same" Released: 7 March 2014; 5. "Can I Get a Moment?" Released: 17 October 2014; 6. "The Day Before I Met You" Released: 13 February 2015

Beautiful is the third studio album by Australian singer Jessica Mauboy, released on 4 October 2013 by Sony Music Australia. The album was recorded at several recording studios in Hollywood, Los Angeles and Sydney. Mauboy worked on Beautiful with a variety of producers and songwriters, including DNA, The Fliptones, Brian Kennedy, Harvey Mason, Jr., Adam Reily and The Underdogs. She co-wrote ten of the thirteen songs on the album's standard edition. The album explored a mixture of dance-oriented tracks with R&B and pop.

Upon its release, Beautiful received positive reviews from critics, who praised its catchy production and honest lyrics. The album debuted at number three on the ARIA Albums Chart and became Mauboy's highest-charting album. It was certified platinum by the Australian Recording Industry Association for shipments of more than 70,000 copies. Beautiful earned Mauboy two nominations at the 2014 ARIA Music Awards for Album of the Year and Best Female Artist. Mauboy promoted the album with television performances and instore appearances. She also embarked on her second headlining concert tour, entitled the To the End of the Earth Tour.

Beautiful produced five singles, including the top-ten hits "Pop a Bottle (Fill Me Up)" and "Never Be the Same", which were both certified platinum for sales exceeding 70,000 copies. The album was re-released as a platinum edition on 21 November 2014 and features five additional songs, including the fifth single "Can I Get a Moment?", which became Mauboy's eighth top-ten hit.

== Background and development ==
In an interview with Spotlight Report, Mauboy admitted that after her work on the 2012 musical film The Sapphires and its soundtrack which features 1960s soul music, she struggled to find a direction for her third studio album. "This album was definitely quite frustrating and hard to put together ... It was a hard process after coming off the back of doing The Sapphires and having that beautiful soul, motown classic music. It really kind of left me not knowing what I wanted to do next because that [The Sapphires] was so good." Mauboy further stated that not knowing which direction she wanted to go with helped. "I had all these stories and feelings. All I needed was to be in the studio and play a bit of piano and play some melodies to help me write."

Mauboy told The Northern Star that Beautiful is "very diverse ... I'm taking it back to my first album where I had a bit of dance and twist of R&B." Part of the album's musical direction was influenced by 1990s music, including dance artists such as Culture Beat and Corona. "I'm such a big '90s fan and grew up with the '90s, and I love how artists had such big vocals and yet such simple bedding on the tracks – and they use such little effects." Mauboy wrote half of Beautiful in Australia with DNA and Adam Reily, and also in Los Angeles. She co-wrote ten of the thirteen songs on the album's standard edition. Harvey Mason, Jr. served as the creative director for Beautiful and co-wrote and produced a number of songs.

== Release and promotion ==
Mauboy's exclusive interview with Melissa Doyle in Darwin was broadcast on Sunday Night on 15 September 2013. On 26 September 2013, she co-hosted The Footy Show and performed a medley of "Inescapable", "To the End of the Earth" and "Saturday Night". On 29 September 2013, Beautiful became available to stream online via Songl.com before its official release. Mauboy performed "Pop a Bottle (Fill Me Up)" during the fifth season of The X Factor Australia on 30 September 2013. The album was released both digitally and physically on 4 October 2013. The following day, Mauboy performed and signed copies of Beautiful at Tumbalong Park, Darling Harbour in Sydney. On 6 October 2013, she performed at the 2013 NRL Grand Final. Mauboy performed songs from Beautiful and signed copies of the album during instore appearances at Westfield Kotara on 7 October 2013 and Westfield Fountain Gate on 10 October 2013. She performed "Pop a Bottle (Fill Me Up)" at the 2013 ARIA Music Awards on 1 December 2013.

The platinum edition of Beautiful was released on 21 November 2014 and features five bonus tracks, including the album's fifth single "Can I Get a Moment?". Mauboy performed the song during the grand final live decider show of the sixth season of The X Factor Australia (20 October 2014), on Sunrise (22 October 2014), and at the 2014 ARIA Music Awards (26 November 2014). She also performed and signed copies of the platinum edition during instore appearances at Westpoint Blacktown (23 November 2014), Castle Towers (30 November 2014), Watergardens Town Centre (7 December 2014) and Westfield Parramatta (13 December 2014).

=== Singles ===
"To the End of the Earth" was released as the lead single from Beautiful on 17 July 2013. It peaked at number 21 on the ARIA Singles Chart and was certified gold by the Australian Recording Industry Association for sales exceeding 35,000 copies. The second single "Pop a Bottle (Fill Me Up)", released on 27 September 2013, debuted at number two and was certified platinum for selling over 70,000 copies. The album's title track "Beautiful" was released as the third single on 22 November 2013, and became Mauboy's lowest charting single at number 46. The fourth single "Never Be the Same", released on 7 March 2014, peaked at number six and was certified platinum. "Can I Get a Moment?" was released as the fifth single from Beautiful on 17 October 2014. It debuted at number five and was certified platinum. "The Day Before I Met You" was released as the sixth single on 13 February 2015, and debuted at number 41.

=== To the End of the Earth Tour ===
In July 2013, Mauboy announced the To the End of the Earth Tour, a national tour presented by Nescafé to celebrate its global 75th anniversary. Tickets for the tour went on sale on 5 August. There were 27 shows in metropolitan and regional Australia that ran from November 2013 to January 2014.

== Reception ==
Professional ratings
Review scores
Source	Rating
Renowned for Sound	4/5 stars
The Border Mail	½

Tim Spencer of Q News viewed Beautiful as the type of album "you can easily wind down and dance to", and concluded that fans of Mauboy's previous efforts "will definitely be impressed with this record." Renowned for Sound's Jana Angeles praised the album's "perfect balance" of pop and R&B, and further added, "what makes Beautiful such an impressive album by Mauboy is the fact that some of the tracks have honest lyrics and are clearly spoken from the heart." Suzie Keen of In Daily wrote the album is "a no-brainer for fans of pure pop" and found the tracks to be "irresistibly catchy." Entertainment Hive's Honey B called it "a stunningly honest CD with beautiful melodies." Beautiful was nominated for "World's Best Album" at the 2014 World Music Awards, and earned Mauboy two nominations at the 2014 ARIA Music Awards for Album of the Year and Best Female Artist.

=== Commercial performance ===
Beautiful debuted at number three on the ARIA Albums Chart issue dated 13 October 2013; it became Mauboy's third top-ten album and the highest-charting album of her career. Due to the success of the album's fourth single "Never Be the Same", Beautiful jumped from number 42 to number 17 for the issue dated 21 April 2014. The following week, Beautiful moved up to number four, making it a fourth week within the top ten for the album. Following the release of the platinum edition in November 2014, Beautiful was certified platinum by the Australian Recording Industry Association for shipments of 70,000 copies.

== Track listing ==
Beautiful — Standard edition
No.	Title	Writer(s)	Producer(s)	Length
1.	"Beautiful"	Jessica Mauboy; Charles Hinshaw; Chaz Mishan; David Delazyn	The Fliptones	3:12
2.	"Kiss Me Hello"	Mauboy; Al-Sherrod "A-Rod" Lambert; Mishan; Delazyn	The Fliptones	3:06
3.	"Pop a Bottle (Fill Me Up)"	Mauboy; Mario Marchetti; Gino Barletta; Rebecca Johnson	Marchetti	3:44
4.	"I Believe"	Mauboy; Adam Reily	Reily	4:03
5.	"Never Be the Same"	Mauboy; Anthony Egizii; David Musumeci	DNA	3:52
6.	"In Love Again"	Mauboy; Reily	Reily	3:27
7.	"Honest"	Mauboy; Brian Kennedy; Reily	Kennedy; Harvey Mason, Jr.^{[a]}; Reily^{[b]}	3:47
8.	"I'll Be There"	Mason, Jr.; Damon Thomas; Britt Burton; Mike Daley; J Que Smith	The Underdogs; Daley^{[c]}	3:54
9.	"Go (I Don't Need You)"	Mauboy; Kennedy; Dante Jones; Ross James Irwin; Samantha Nathan	Kennedy; Jones^{[c]}; Mason, Jr.^{[a]}; Reily^{[b]}	3:24
10.	"Heartbreak Party"	Mason, Jr.; Thomas; Burton; Andrew Hey	The Underdogs	3:42
11.	"Barriers"	Mauboy; Egizii; Musumeci	DNA	3:49
12.	"To the End of the Earth"	Mauboy; Jaden Michaels; Ben Berger; Ryan McMahon	Berger; McMahon	3:07
13.	"Kick Up Your Heels" (featuring Pitbull)	Jonathan Perkins; Jeremy Skaller; Nikki Flores; Armando Perez	J Remy; Jonny Perkins; Reily^{[b]}	3:11

Beautiful — Platinum edition (bonus tracks)
No.	Title	Writer(s)	Producer(s)	Length
14.	"Can I Get a Moment?"	Antonio Dixon; Kenneth "Babyface" Edmonds; Khristopher Riddick-Tynes; Carmen Reece; Leon Thomas III; Helen Jane Culver	Edmonds; Dixon; The Rascals	3:25
15.	"The Day Before I Met You"	Dixon; Edmonds; Riddick-Tynes; Culver; Mauboy	Dixon; Edmonds; The Rascals	3:33
16.	"All Mine"	Mauboy; Par Westerlund; Cristi Vaughn	Paro	3:24
17.	"Palace"	Mauboy; Louis Schoorl; Alex Hope	Schoorl	3:14
18.	"Nothing to Lose"	Mauboy; Egizii; Musumeci	DNA	3:16

Notes

- ^{^a} signifies an additional producer
- ^{^b} signifies a vocal producer
- ^{^c} signifies a co-producer

== Credits ==
Adapted from album liner.

=== Recording locations ===
- Adz Joint in Sydney
- Brandon's Way Recording Studios in Los Angeles
- Captain Cuts Studios in Los Angeles
- The Highlands in Hollywood
- Mason Sound in North Hollywood
- New Holland Studios in Sydney
- Orange Factory Studios in Los Angeles
- Rondor/Universal Recording Studio
- Sony Studios in Sydney

=== Mastering locations ===
- Sterling Sound in New York City
- Studios 301 in Sydney

=== Personnel ===
Vocal credits

- Alex Hope – backing vocals
- Jessica Mauboy – lead vocals
- Pitbull – featured artist
- Louis Schoorl – backing vocals

Creative credits

- Liz Ham – photography
- Rachel Kara – photography
- Harvey Mason, Jr. – creative director
- Darren McDonald – photography
- Eoin Stanley – artwork design
- Sony DADC – artwork design

Technical credits

- Gino Barletta – songwriter, vocal producer, engineering
- Ben Berger (Captain Cuts) – songwriter, producer, engineering
- Bekuh BOOM – vocal producer, engineering
- Paul Boutin – recording, mixing
- Trina Bowman – production coordination
- David Boyd – recording, recording assistant
- Rikard Brandén – guitars, additional programming
- Adrian Breakspear – additional engineering
- Britt Burton – songwriter
- Miguel Costa – horns
- Tom Coyne – mastering
- Helen Jane Culver – songwriter
- Mike Daley – songwriter, co-producer, recording assistant
- David Delazyn (The Fliptones) – songwriter
- Antonio Dixon – songwriter, producer
- Kenneth "Babyface" Edmonds – songwriter, producer
- Anthony Egizii (DNA) – songwriter, producer, mixing, programming and keys
- Randy Ellis – horns
- Mike Fletcher – saxophone
- Nikki Flores – songwriter
- Andrew Hey – songwriter, guitars, recording
- Charles Hinshaw – songwriter, producer, programming and keys
- Alex Hope – songwriter, guitar
- Eric Jackson – guitars
- Ross James Irwin – songwriter
- Rebecca Johnson – songwriter
- Dante Jones – songwriter, co-producer
- Brian Kennedy – songwriter, producer
- Al-Sherrod "A-Rod" Lambert – songwriter
- Mario Marchetti – songwriter, producer, vocal producer
- Harvey Mason, Jr. (The Underdogs) – songwriter, producer, additional producer, mixing
- Jessica Mauboy – songwriter
- Mitchell McCarthy – mixing
- Ryan McMahon (Captain Cuts) – songwriter, producer, engineering
- Jaden Michaels – songwriter
- Chaz Mishan (The Fliptones) – songwriter, producer, programming and keys
- Raymond Monteiro – horns
- David Musumeci (DNA) – songwriter, producer, guitars
- Samantha Nathan – songwriter
- Armando Perez (Pitbull) – songwriter
- Jonathan Perkins (Jonny Perkins) – songwriter, producer, programming and keys, engineering
- Sean Phelan – mixing
- Carmen Reece – songwriter
- Adam Reily – songwriter, producer, vocal producer, programming and keys
- Khristopher Riddick-Tynes (The Rascals) – songwriter, producer
- James Royo – mixing
- Stuart Schenk – engineering
- Louis Schoorl – songwriter, producer, recording, mixing, keyboards, guitar, programming
- Jeremy Skaller (J Remy) – songwriter, producer
- Garrett Smith – horns
- J Que Smith – songwriter
- Damon Thomas (The Underdogs) – songwriter, producer
- Leon Thomas III (The Rascals) – songwriter, producer
- Cristi Vaughn – songwriter
- Miles Walker – mixing
- Par Westerlund (Paro) – songwriter, producer, instruments and programming
- Leon Zervos – mastering

== Charts ==
=== Weekly charts ===
Chart (2013)	Peak position
Australian Albums (ARIA)	3

=== Year-end charts ===
Chart (2013)	Rank
Australian Albums Chart	61
Australian Artist Albums Chart	15

Chart (2014)	Rank
Australian Albums Chart	51
Australian Artist Albums Chart	21

== Certifications ==
Region	Certification	Certified units/sales
Australia (ARIA)	Platinum	70,000^{^}
^{^} Shipments figures based on certification alone.

== Release history ==
Region	Date	Format	Edition(s)	Label	Catalogue
Australia	4 October 2013	CD; digital download	Standard	Sony Music Australia	88883779062
Australia	21 November 2014	CD; digital download	Platinum	Sony Music Australia	88843088302
