= To the End of the Earth Tour =

2013–14 concert tour by Jessica Mauboy

- Tour by Jessica Mauboy
- Promotional poster for the tour
- Associated album: Beautiful
- Start date: 7 November 2013
- End date: 24 January 2014
- Legs: 1
- No. of shows: 27 in Australia; 27 Total

Jessica Mauboy concert chronology
- Galaxy Tour (2012); To the End of the Earth Tour (2013–14); All the Hits Live Tour (2017)

To the End of the Earth Tour is the second concert tour by Australian recording artist Jessica Mauboy, but her first solo headlining national tour. There are 27 shows in metropolitan and regional Australia, running from November 2013 to January 2014. Launched to support the release of her third studio album, Beautiful (2013), the tour began on 7 November 2013 in Adelaide, South Australia. A diverse set of songs from the studio albums Been Waiting, Get 'Em Girls and Beautiful, along with covers and songs from The Sapphires are part of the tour.

== Background and synopsis ==
In July 2013, Mauboy announced the end of the To the End of the Earth Tour, a national tour presented by Nescafé to celebrate its global 75th anniversary. Tickets for the tour went on sale on 5 August. Mauboy is also headlining a series of Nescafé intimate acoustic sessions in five cities. The tour has been choreographed by Marko Panzic. Mauboy said that her shows will take the audience on a "journey from (her) early career right up to now" and noted that "it's time to look back and then look forward." Mauboy says that the tour creates "one big party atmosphere" and that there will be "fun costumes, an amazing band, it's a big show." Mauboy is playing two shows at the Darwin Entertainment Centre, in her hometown Darwin, and said that it would be "amazing" to have all her friends, family and familiar faces in the audience.

The setlist also includes an encore of "Inescapable" and "Pop a Bottle (Fill Me Up)". The five acts consisted of songs from:

- Been Waiting
- Get 'Em Girls
- The Sapphires
- Beautiful

== Critical reception ==
Mauboy has garnered positive reviews and high praise for her To the End of the Earth Tour shows. The first show in Adelaide received exceptional reviews from critics. Matt Gilbertson from Adelaide Now stated, "Jessica Mauboy proves that she has more than what it takes to compete on the international pop scene delivering a truly world class performance", before noting that Mauboy's energy, extraordinary vocals and endearing personality spoke for itself. Gilbertson described Mauboy as "one of Australia's finest female pop treasures" and stated that the whole crowd was on their feet by the end of the night.

Glamadelaide commented that one of the highlights of the show was when the "whole band changed outfits for The Sapphires medley", where Mauboy's voice "absolutely soared". Glamadelaide also praised Mauboy's fashion choices and swift costume changes, noting that she looked fierce in silver leather shorts and a jacket with the letters 'JM 89' on the back. Writers from music blogging site auspOp reviewed Mauboy's Melbourne show and stated that she had "great stage presence". auspOp also noted that Mauboy's renditions of "I Have Nothing" along with "Time After Time" were "brilliant" and the "whole auditorium came to a hush" in the special "moment", before highlighting that Mauboy has done an exceptional job growing up in the public eye.

Of her Sydney show, Yahoo 7 commented that Mauboy is the "hardest working girl in showbiz" and revved up the audience with "confidence and gusto", while also mentioning that her "powerful vocal range was in stunning display" when she sang "I Have Nothing". Yahoo 7 also stated: 'There were at least five fabulous costume changes, from silver space-suit-like numbers to glittery, sparkly dresses, all made in such speed at least one audience member nearby remarked at how bewildered they were that Mauboy managed it.' Clayton Bennett from NT News stated that Mauboy's "double date" in Darwin "didn't disappoint", and that "everyone was keen to see Jess on stage" for her two sell-out shows. Bennett described Mauboy as a "bubbly beauty" and also noted the diversity of the "packed" Darwin audience, consisting of family, friends and fans.

Dannielle Elms from Renowned for Sound commented that Mauboy "wowed" the crowd at her Brisbane concert, before stating: "Her voice was faultless, her style was refined and choreographed and her banter and communication with the audience was sweet, funny and classy."

== Opening acts ==
- Nathaniel Willemse (All other tour dates except Melbourne)
- The Collective (Melbourne)

== Set list ==
This set list consists of 24 songs and is representative of the 1st show in Adelaide. It does not represent all concerts for the duration of the tour.

1. "Up/Down"
2. "Burn"
3. "Been Waiting"
4. "Let Me Be Me"
5. "I Have Nothing" (cover)
6. "Time After Time" (cover)
7. "What Happened to Us"
8. "Because"
9. "Running Back"
10. "Scariest Part"
11. "Foreign"
12. "Reconnected"
13. "Get 'Em Girls"
14. "Handle It"
15. "Who's Loving You" (cover)
16. "I Heard It Through The Grapevine" (cover)
17. "I Can't Help Myself (Sugar Pie Honey Bunch)" (cover)
18. "Land of a Thousand Dances" (cover)
19. "Gotcha"
20. "Beautiful"
21. "To the End of the Earth"
22. "Saturday Night"

Encore

23. "Inescapable"
24. "Pop a Bottle (Fill Me Up)"

Notes

- "I Have Nothing" was the song that Mauboy auditioned with for Australian Idol.
- For the performance of "What Happened to Us", Nathaniel Willemse sings the parts of Jay Sean. However, the song was not part of the Melbourne show setlist due to Willemse's absence as a result of unforeseen circumstances.

== Tour dates ==
Date	City	Venue
7 November 2013	Adelaide	Adelaide Entertainment Centre
9 November 2013	Melbourne	Melbourne Convention & Exhibition Centre
13 November 2013	Wollongong	Wollongong Entertainment Centre
14 November 2013	Newcastle	Newcastle Entertainment Centre
15 November 2013	Sydney	The Star
16 November 2013	Darwin	Darwin Entertainment Centre
17 November 2013	Darwin	Darwin Entertainment Centre
19 November 2013	Brisbane	Brisbane Convention & Exhibition Centre
20 November 2013	Gold Coast	Jupiters Theatre
22 November 2013	Caloundra	Events Centre
24 November 2013	Bundaberg	Moncrieff Theatre
26 November 2013	Rockhampton	Pilbeam Theatre
27 November 2013	Mackay	The Halls, Mackay Entertainment Centre
29 November 2013	Townsville	Townsville Entertainment Centre
8 January 2014	Toowoomba	Empire Theatre
9 January 2014	Coffs Harbour	Coffs Ex Services
10 January 2014	Lismore	Lismore Workers
11 January 2014	Port Macquarie	Glasshouse
12 January 2014	Tamworth	Tamworth Entertainment Centre
14 January 2014	Forster	Club Forster
17 January 2014	Penrith	Evan Theatre, Panthers
18 January 2014	Canberra	AIS Arena
19 January 2014	Albury	Albury Entertainment Centre
21 January 2014	Shepparton	Eastbank Centre
22 January 2014	Bendigo	Bendigo Stadium
23 January 2014	Ballarat	Wendouree Centre for Performing Art
24 January 2014	Geelong	Geelong Arena

== Personnel ==
Credits and personnel are taken from the Official To the End of the Earth Tour Program.

=== Behind the scenes ===
Creative direction:

- Jessica Mauboy and Darryl Beaton – Show/musical direction
- Jessica Mauboy and Kevin Mendoza – Creative/technical direction
- Marko Panzic – Choreography
- Mikey Ayoubi – Styling for Mauboy
- Johnny Schembri – Costume design for Mauboy
- John-Pierre Georges and Angela White – Styling and costumes for band
- Bravo Child and Alphamama – Styling assistants

Production:

- Ade Barnard – Production manager
- Connie Samaniego - Assistant to Mauboy, WHS & Security
- Chris Braun – Front-of-House engineer
- Ivan Ordenes – Monitor engineer
- Michael "Simmo" Simpson – Stage and lighting
- Mark Bollenberg – PA Tech
- Pat Meyer – Guitar tech
- Christian Walsh – Drum tech

Management:

- David Champion – Management
- Robyn Jelleff – Tour manager
- Nine Live – Promoter
- Nescafé – Sponsor

=== Band ===
- Jessica Mauboy – Lead vocals

Beatiq musicians:

- Darryl Beaton – Musical director, keyboards and guitar
- Kevin Mendoza – Drums and percussion
- Kyle Mercado – Bass
- Paul Mason – Guitar
- Tabitha Ojeah – Backing vocals
- Anita Meiruntu – Backing vocals
