= Jessica Mauboy =

Australian singer (born 1989)

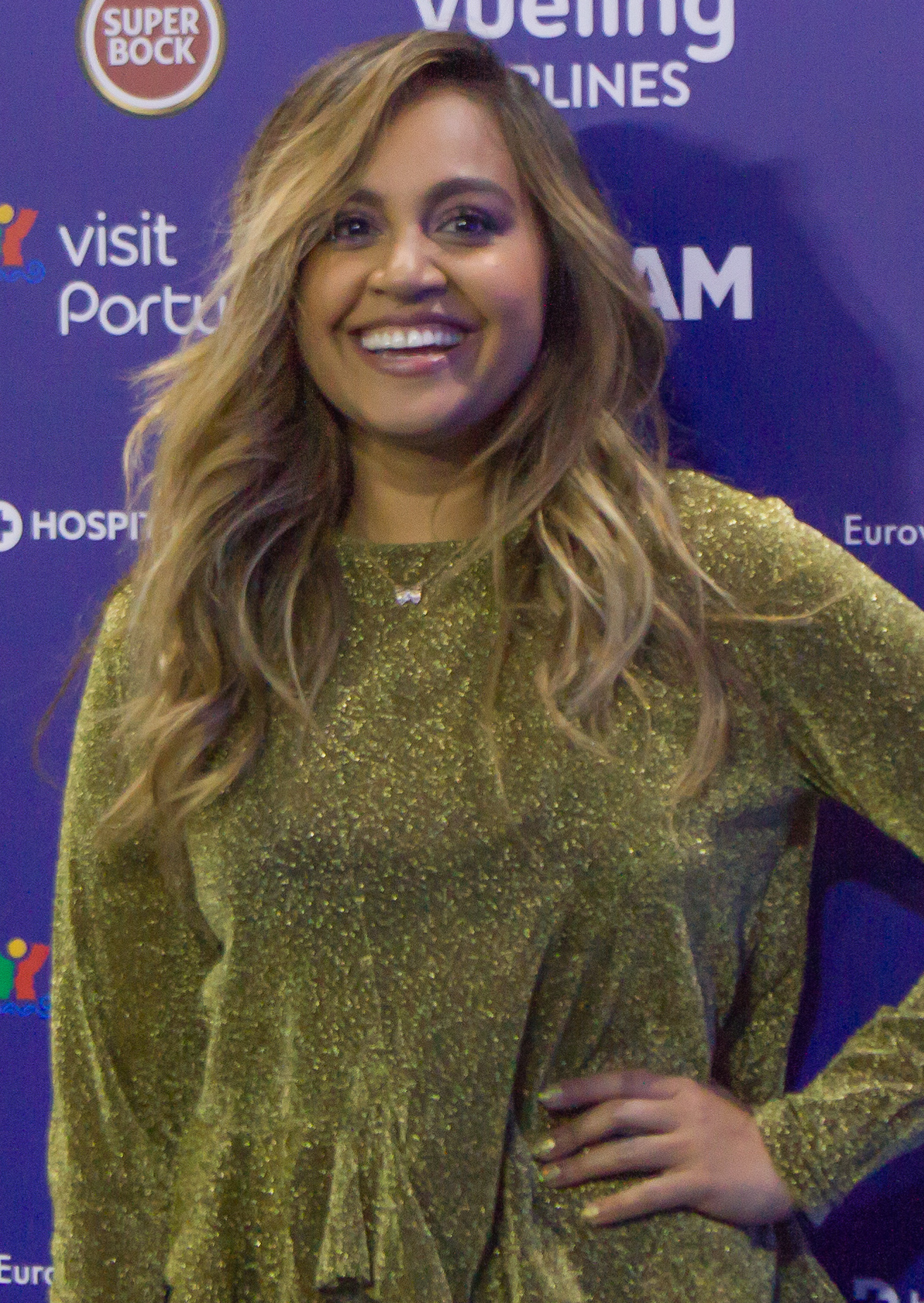
- Mauboy in 2018
- Born: Jessica Hilda Mauboy; 4 August 1989 (age 37); Darwin, Northern Territory, Australia
- Occupations: Singer; songwriter; actress
- Years active: 2003–present
- Spouse: Themeli Magripilis (m. 2022)
- Children: 1
- Musical career
- Genres: R&B; pop; soul; funk; hip hop; dance
- Instrument: Vocals
- Labels: Sony (2003–2020); Warner (2021–2024); Jamally/DistroDirect (2025+)
- Formerly of: Young Divas
- Website: jessicamauboy.com.au

Jessica Hilda Mauboy (/ˈmaʊbɔɪ/; born 4 August 1989) is an Australian singer and actress. Born and raised in Darwin, Northern Territory, she rose to fame in 2006 on the fourth season of Australian Idol, where she was runner-up and subsequently signed a recording contract with Sony Music Australia. After releasing a live album of her Idol performances and briefly being a member of the girl group Young Divas in 2007, Mauboy released her debut studio album, Been Waiting, the following year. It included her first number-one single, "Burn", and became the second highest-selling Australian album of 2009, certified double platinum by the Australian Recording Industry Association (ARIA).

Her second studio album, Get 'Em Girls (2010), showcased a harder-edged R&B sound, and produced four platinum singles. Her third studio album, Beautiful (2013), a mixture of dance-oriented tracks, R&B and pop, included the top-ten hits "Pop a Bottle (Fill Me Up)", "Never Be the Same" and "Can I Get a Moment?".

Aside from her music career, Mauboy has ventured into acting, with starring roles in the films Bran Nue Dae (2010), and The Sapphires (2012), which earned her the AACTA Award for Best Actress in a Supporting Role. She returned to acting in 2016 in the lead role in the television drama series The Secret Daughter for two seasons. It was her first major TV role and was written especially for her. She released two soundtrack albums from the show, the first of which made her the first Indigenous artist with a number-one album on the ARIA Albums Chart. Her fourth studio album, Hilda (October 2019), debuted at number one.

Mauboy is one of Australia's most successful female artists. She has achieved six top-ten albums (including two number-ones) and 16 top-twenty singles (including 9 top-ten hits). She has won two ARIA Music Awards from 25 nominations, and was ranked sixteenth on the Herald Sun's list of the "100 Greatest Australian Singers of All Time". She has collaborated with international artists such as Flo Rida, Snoop Dogg, Ludacris, Jay Sean, Pitbull and Jason Derulo. She has also toured with Beyoncé and Chris Brown, and performed at many notable events, including the Australian visits for Oprah Winfrey, Ellen DeGeneres, and US President Barack Obama. She was a guest performer at the second semi-final of the Eurovision Song Contest in 2014. She competed for Australia at the Eurovision Song Contest 2018 and reached 20th place. From 2021 to 2023, she was featured as a coach on The Voice Australia.

In 2025, Mauboy was inducted into the National Indigenous Music Awards Hall of Fame.

== Early life and education ==
Jessica Hilda Mauboy was born on 4 August 1989 and raised in Darwin, Northern Territory. Her father, Ferdy, is an Indonesian-born electrician from West Timor. Her mother, Therese, is an Aboriginal Australian woman of the Kuku Yalanji people, whose traditional lands are the rainforest regions of Far North Queensland. Mauboy has three older sisters, Sandra, Jenny and Catherine; and a younger sister, Sophia. She discovered later in life that her first cousin once removed on her mother's side is Olympic gold medalist Cathy Freeman. From an early age, she was involved in the local church choir with her grandmother Harriett. Her home was described as the "noisiest house on the block", with her mother often singing, her father playing guitar and the rest of the family displaying their passion for music.

She attended Wulagi Primary School and Sanderson High School in Darwin. She dropped out of school in year 11 to pursue her passion for music.

At age fourteen, Mauboy's talents were exposed through the Telstra Road to Tamworth competition at the 2004 Tamworth Country Music Festival in Tamworth, New South Wales. As the first winner of the competition, she travelled to Sydney to perform, in which The Bushwackers were her backing vocalists, who became Mauboy's mentees in The Voice of Australia in 2023. She also scored a recording deal with Sony Music Australia. She released a country-inspired rendition of the Cyndi Lauper hit "Girls Just Wanna Have Fun". A video of the song was produced and released, but the song was unsuccessful and Mauboy returned to Darwin.

== Music career ==
=== 2006: Australian Idol ===
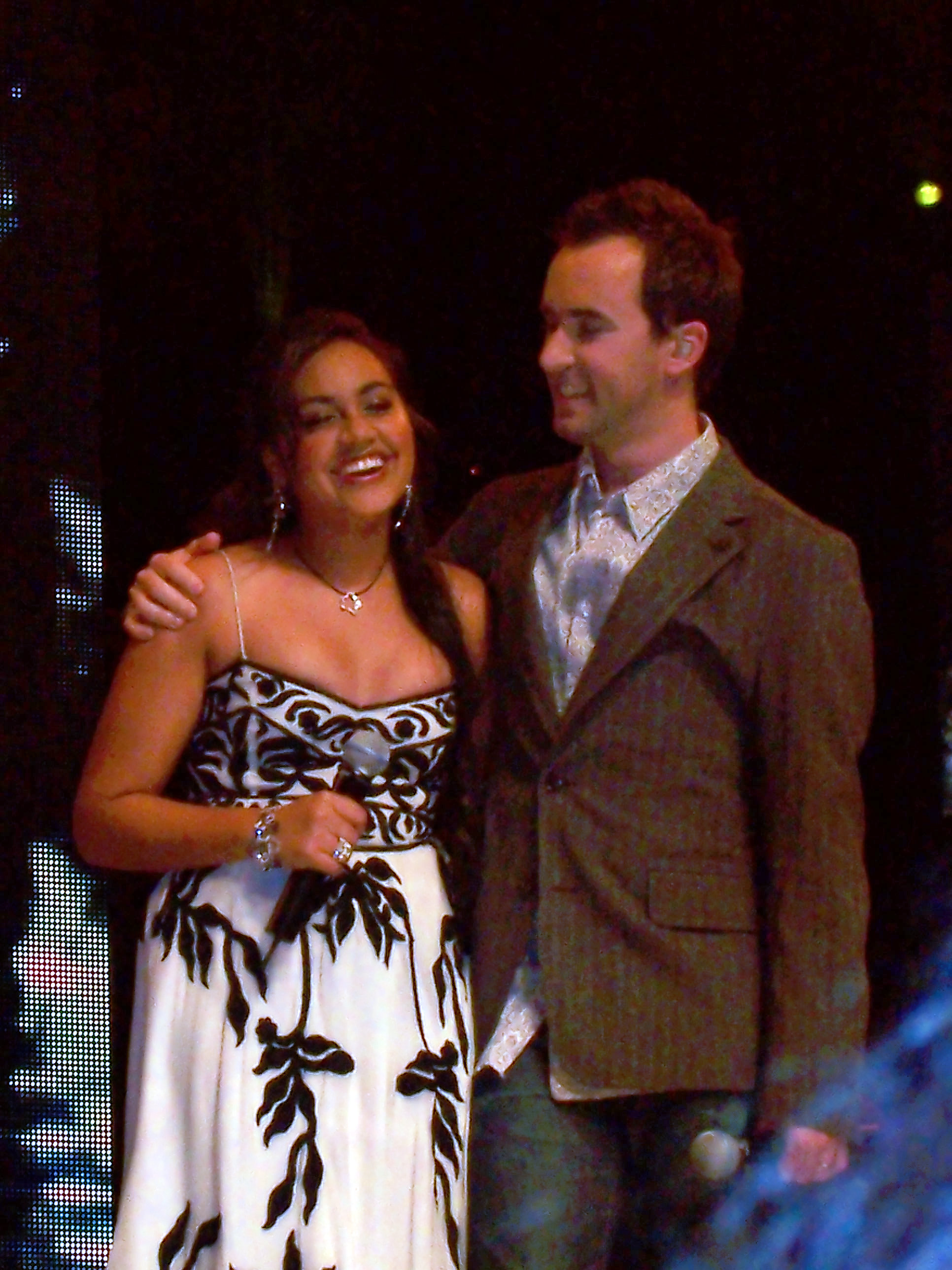
Mauboy with Damien Leith at the Australian Idol grand finale

In 2006, Mauboy auditioned for the fourth season of Australian Idol in Alice Springs, Northern Territory, singing Whitney Houston's "I Have Nothing". Her audition impressed all three judges, and she progressed to the semi-finals, then to the top twelve. The media cited her previous Sony contract as grounds for dismissal, but since it had expired, the producers refused to remove her from the show. In the final eleven week, following her rendition of Kelly Clarkson's "Walk Away", judge Kyle Sandilands commented on Mauboy's weight, and said that if she wanted to succeed in the music industry, she should "lose the jelly belly". Mauboy appeared stunned by the comment. In an interview with Who magazine's Alicia Neil, two years after the comment, Mauboy said, "I kind of took it as a joke... I look back on it as a positive thing–it made me a stronger person."

In the final ten-week, Mauboy received the first touchdown of the season from judge Mark Holden for her rendition of Christina Aguilera's hit "Beautiful". During the final nine-week, she had a sore throat that resulted in a mediocre rendition of Phil Collins' "Another Day in Paradise" and near-elimination, landing her in the bottom three. She never landed in the bottom three again, and ended up progressing to the final show with Damien Leith. At the grand finale on 27 November at the Sydney Opera House, Mauboy was voted runner-up to Leith. In December 2006, she signed a recording contract with Sony Music Australia, two weeks after Idol ended.

=== 2007–2009: The Journey, Young Divas and Been Waiting ===
Mauboy released her debut live album The Journey on 24 February 2007, which contained two discs. Disc one contained re-recorded covers of the selected songs Mauboy performed as part of the top twelve on Australian Idol, while disc two included a DVD of her performances on the series. The Journey debuted at number four on the ARIA Albums Chart and was certified gold by the Australian Recording Industry Association for shipments of 35,000 units. In September 2007, Mauboy joined as the new member of the girl group Young Divas, replacing one of the group's original members, Ricki-Lee Coulter, who had left in June to resume her solo career. Their second studio album New Attitude was released on 24 November 2007, and debuted at number 10 and was certified gold. The album was preceded by the lead single "Turn Me Loose", which peaked at number 15 on the ARIA Singles Chart. In March 2008, Mauboy signed on to the Australian Government In2Oz program, designed to promote closer ties with Indonesia. As a part of the program, she travelled to Indonesia for a three-day trip performing around the country, including an appearance on Indonesian Idol. It was during this time that Mauboy had begun to work on her first solo studio album. In August 2008, Mauboy announced that after a year with the Young Divas, she had decided to quit to concentrate on her solo career. Founding member Paulini had also decided to depart, leaving Kate DeAraugo and Emily Williams as the only remaining members. However, both DeAraugo and Williams resumed their solo careers, and the group officially disbanded.

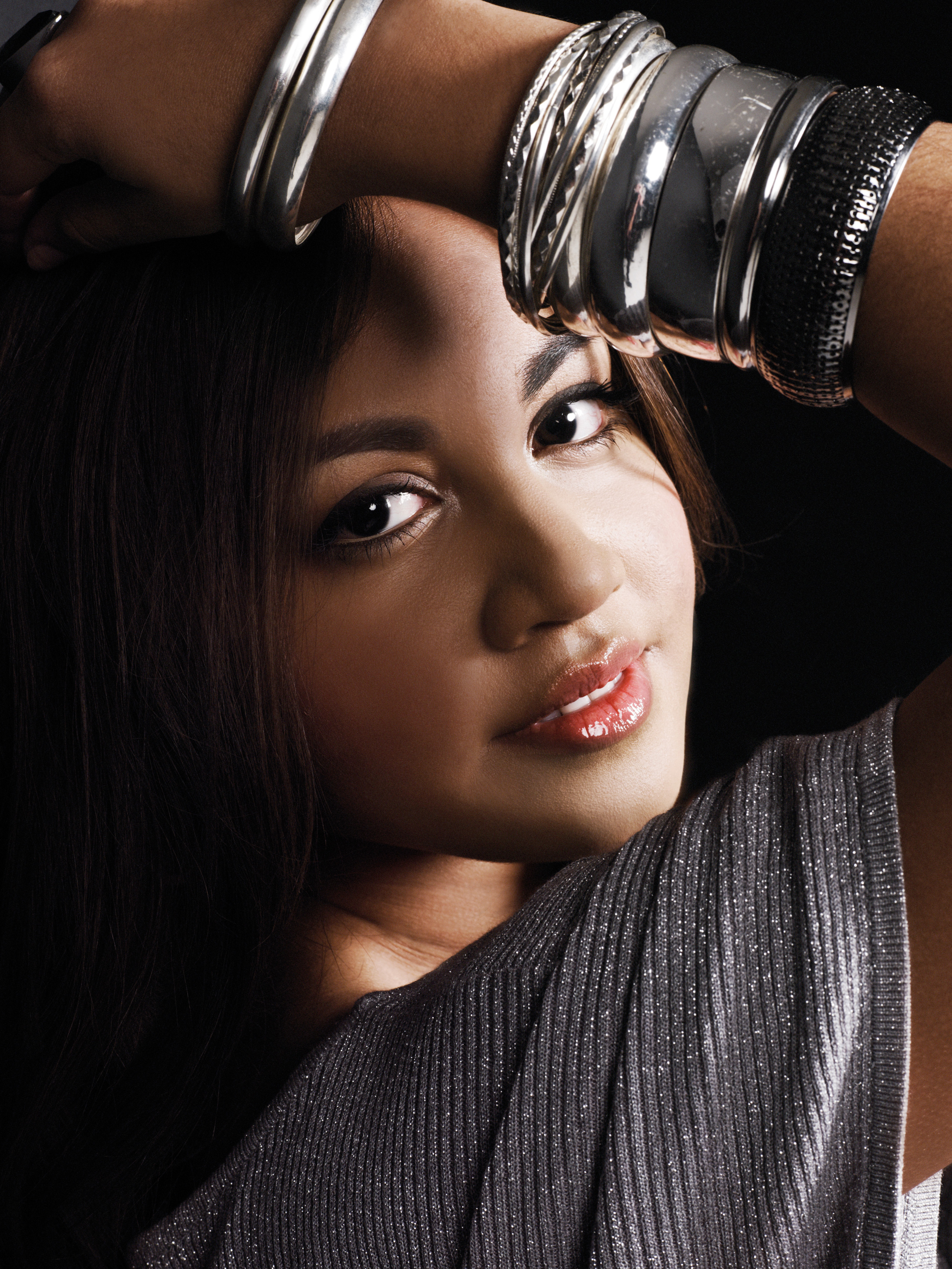
A publicity shot of Mauboy in July 2009

Mauboy's debut studio album Been Waiting was released on 22 November 2008; it peaked at number 11 and was certified double platinum for shipments of 140,000 units. Mauboy co-wrote eleven of the album's songs, which were produced by Audius Mtawarira, Israel Cruz, Jonas Jeberg, Cutfather, Adam Reily, Fingaz and Kwamé. The album received positive reviews from critics. Davey Boy of Sputnikmusic gave the album three out of five stars and wrote that it was an "impressive debut which suggests that there could indeed be quality music to look forward to in the future, as she matures and gains experience". The lead single "Running Back", featuring American rapper Flo Rida, peaked at number three and was certified double platinum. The second single, "Burn", became Mauboy's first number-one single, and was certified platinum. It also reached number 92 on the Japan Hot 100 and became Mauboy's first single to chart internationally. The album's third single and title track peaked at number 12 and was certified gold. The following singles, "Because" and "Up/Down", peaked at numbers nine and 11, respectively, and both were certified gold.

In February 2009, Mauboy signed with UK record label Ministry of Sound. Been Waiting was released in Japan on 22 April 2009, and reached number 138 on the Japanese Albums Chart. At the 2009 Deadly Awards, Mauboy won three awards in the categories of Female Artist of the Year, Album of the Year for Been Waiting, and Single Release of the Year for "Burn". Along with Flo Rida, Mauboy served as a support act for Beyoncé on the Australian leg of her I Am... World Tour in September 2009. At the 2009 ARIA Music Awards, Mauboy earned seven nominations for Been Waiting and its singles; she was nominated for Highest Selling Album, Best Pop Release, Breakthrough Artist Album, Best Female Artist, Breakthrough Artist Single for "Running Back", and Highest Selling Single for "Running Back" and "Burn". Eventually, Mauboy won Highest Selling Single for "Running Back".

=== 2010–2012: Get 'Em Girls and The Sapphires soundtrack ===
In January 2010, Mauboy signed to Universal Music for an exclusive worldwide long-term publishing agreement. In May 2010, Mauboy collaborated with four other international artists representing their continents—Sean Kingston representing America, Jody Williams representing Africa, Tabitha Nauser (Asia), Steve Appleton (Europe), with Mauboy representing Oceania—on the theme song for the 2010 Summer Youth Olympics titled "Everyone". Mauboy, Williams, Nauser and Appleton performed "Everyone" at the opening of the Youth Olympics held in Singapore on 14 August 2010. Kingston was unable to attend the performance, due to a passport mix-up. Mauboy released her second studio album Get 'Em Girls on 5 November 2010; it debuted at number six and was certified gold. She had travelled to the United States in February of that year to work on the album in Los Angeles, New York City, and Atlanta with American songwriters and producers, most of whom she had not worked with previously. Mauboy co-wrote eight of the album's songs. Get 'Em Girls received mixed reviews from critics. Majhid Heath of ABC Online Indigenous gave the album two-and-a-half out of five stars, writing that it's a "non-cohesive mess of similar sounding, auto-tuned ravaged pop/R&B that diminishes the talent of this brilliant young songstress".

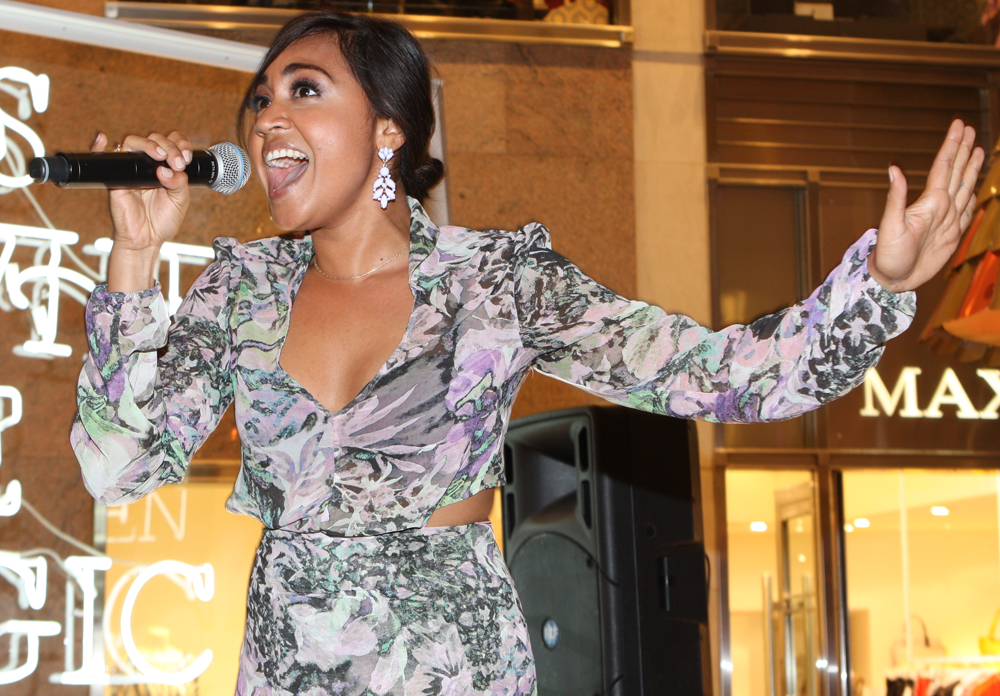
Mauboy performing in 2012

The album's title track, featuring American rapper Snoop Dogg, peaked at number 19. Mauboy performed "Get 'Em Girls" at the 2010 Nickelodeon Australian Kids' Choice Awards, where she co-hosted the award ceremony with Liam Hemsworth and Jerry Trainor, and won the award for Fave Aussie Muso. The following singles, "Saturday Night" featuring American rapper Ludacris and "What Happened to Us" featuring English singer Jay Sean, peaked at numbers seven and 14, respectively. The former single was certified double platinum while the latter was only certified platinum. At the 2010 Australian of the Year Awards, Mauboy received her first nomination for Young Australian of the Year. On 10 December 2010, she performed in front of an audience of 92,000 at the Federation Square in Melbourne, ahead of Oprah Winfrey's visit to the place. Mauboy's performance was shown in the first of the four Australian specials of The Oprah Winfrey Show on 18 January 2011. In April 2011, she served as a support act for Chris Brown's Australian leg of his F.A.M.E. Tour.

Get 'Em Girls was re-released as a deluxe edition on 12 August 2011, which included the singles "Inescapable" and "Galaxy" featuring Stan Walker. The former single peaked at number four and was certified double platinum, while the latter peaked at number 13 and was certified platinum. "Galaxy" also reached number 36 on the New Zealand Singles Chart and became Mauboy's first single to chart in that country. On 17 November 2011, Mauboy performed for the Australian troops at RAAF Base Darwin, ahead of US President Barack Obama's visit to the place. In January 2012, Mauboy and Walker embarked on their Galaxy Tour across Australia, which served as her first headlining tour. Mauboy recorded 15 songs for The Sapphires' soundtrack album, which was released on 27 July 2012. The album debuted at number one and was certified platinum. Mauboy released "Gotcha" as the album's lead single, which peaked at number 43 and was certified gold. At the 2012 ARIA Music Awards, she was nominated for Best Female Artist, Best Pop Release for "Gotcha", and Song of the Year for "Galaxy".

=== 2013–2014: Beautiful, Eurovision and iTunes Session EP ===
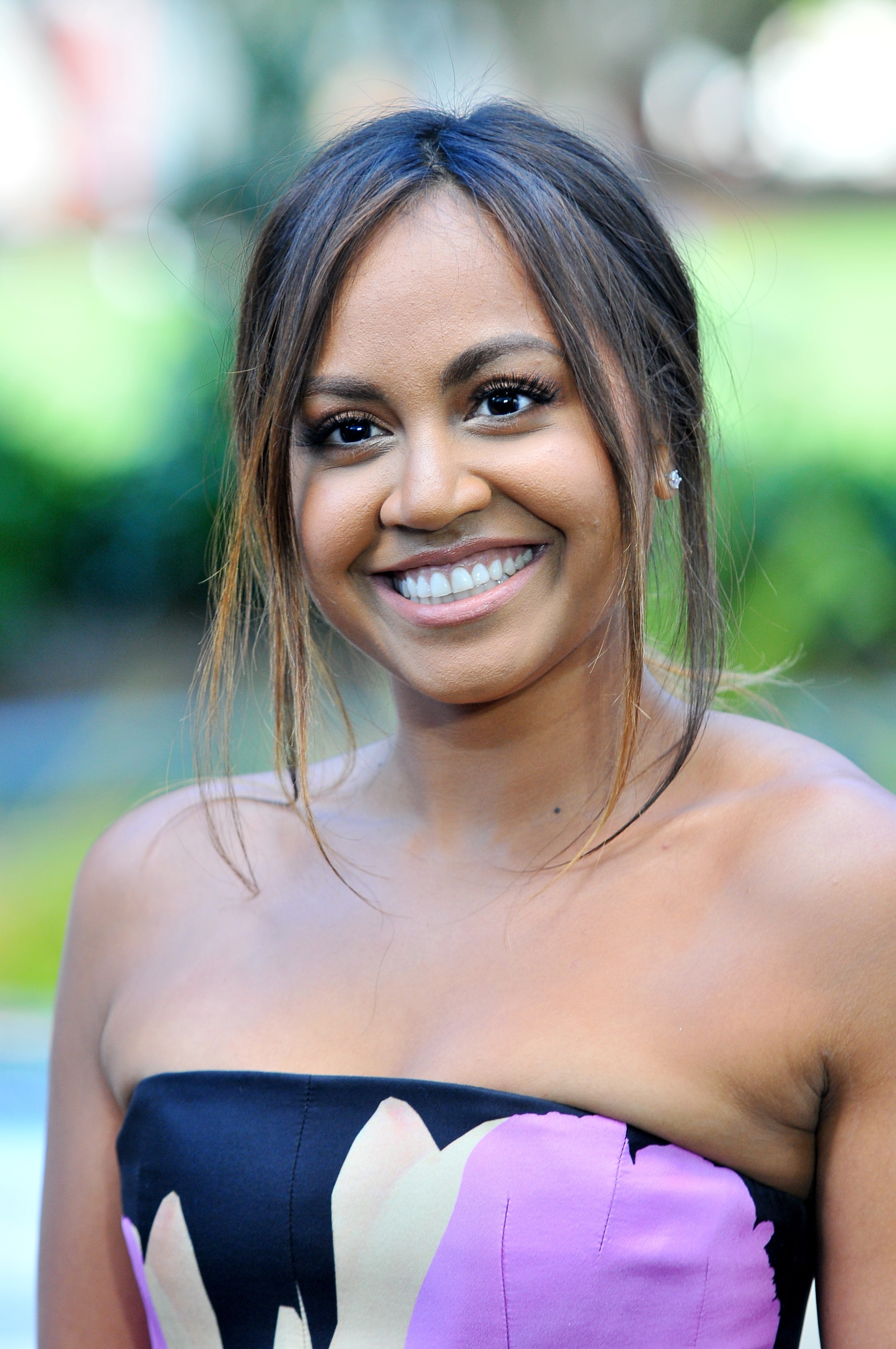
Mauboy at the 2013 ARIA Music Awards

Mauboy received two nominations at the 2013 Australian of the Year Awards for Young Australian of the Year and Northern Territory Young Australian of the Year; she won the latter award. In March 2013, she participated in a singing quiz segment for Ellen DeGeneres' two Australian shows in Sydney and Melbourne. In September 2013, she performed at the 65th Primetime Emmy Awards Governors Ball in Los Angeles. Mauboy's third studio album Beautiful was released on 4 October 2013; it debuted at number three and was certified platinum. The lead single "To the End of the Earth" peaked at number 21 and was certified gold, while the second single "Pop a Bottle (Fill Me Up)" debuted at number two and was certified platinum. "Pop a Bottle (Fill Me Up)" also reached number 33 in New Zealand and became Mauboy's third single to chart internationally. The following singles, "Beautiful" and "Never Be the Same", peaked at numbers 46 and six, respectively, with the latter single being certified platinum.

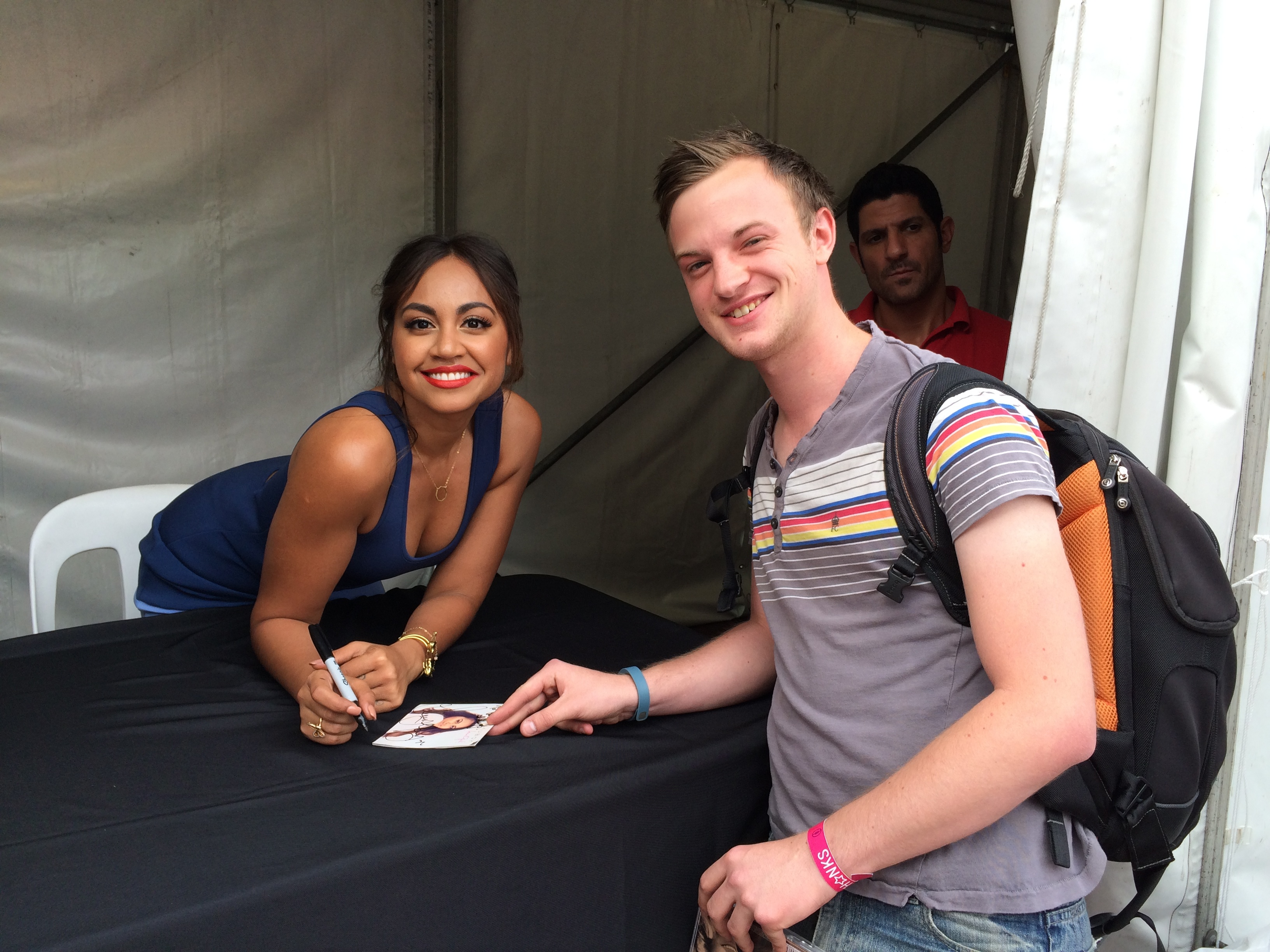
Mauboy with a football fan during the 2013 NRL Grand Final Week

At the 2013 NRL Grand Final on 6 October 2013, Mauboy performed the Australian national anthem, "Livin' la Vida Loca", with Ricky Martin, and a medley of "Something's Got a Hold on Me" and "Pop a Bottle (Fill Me Up)". At the 2013 ARIA Music Awards, Mauboy won Best Female Artist for "To the End of the Earth". She embarked on the To the End of the Earth Tour, her second headlining tour, from November 2013 to January 2014. To coincide with the 2014 Australia Day celebrations, Mauboy along with Dami Im, Justice Crew, Nathaniel Willemse, Samantha Jade and Taylor Henderson released a cover of "I Am Australian" which peaked at number 51. She appeared in an episode of Sesame Street on 20 March 2014, singing "Count the Kangaroos" in a clip which was filmed in Alice Springs with children from Yipirinya State Primary School. Mauboy was chosen by SBS to perform at the Eurovision Song Contest 2014, in recognition of Australia's love affair with the annual event. She performed the single "Sea of Flags" during the second semi-final in Denmark. SBS screened the documentary, Jessica Mauboy's Road to Eurovision on 10 May 2014 before their coverage of the second semi-final.

Mauboy's first extended play iTunes Session was released on 18 July 2014, and debuted at number 25. On 3 August 2014, she performed during the 2014 Commonwealth Games Flag Handover Ceremony at Hampden Park Stadium in Glasgow, Scotland, to mark the official handover of the Commonwealth Games from Glasgow to the Gold Coast in 2018. Beautiful was re-released as a platinum edition on 21 November 2014, which included the singles "Can I Get a Moment?" and "The Day Before I Met You". The former single debuted at number five and was certified platinum. Mauboy received three nominations at the 2014 ARIA Music Awards, including Album of the Year and Best Female Artist for Beautiful, and Best Video for "Never Be the Same".

=== 2015–2018: The Secret Daughter soundtracks and Eurovision ===
Mauboy performed at the ICC Cricket World Cup opening ceremony held on 12 February 2015 at the Sidney Myer Music Bowl in Melbourne. On 3 May 2015, she appeared on the US Today show in a segment that was filmed live at the Sydney Opera House with host Savannah Guthrie. In an interview with the Australian Associated Press that same month, Mauboy revealed that she had already begun writing songs for her upcoming fourth studio album. She said, "This time around with the album I would like to...just take risks in terms of the sound and identifying who I am as a woman. It's more of a rhythmic pop so it's not going to be extreme pop. It's going to be a little bit more soul." "This Ain't Love", released in September 2015, was originally intended to be the album's lead single; it peaked at number five and was certified gold. Mauboy along with The Veronicas and Tina Arena performed Arena's 1994 single "Chains" at the 2015 ARIA Music Awards, where Arena was inducted into the ARIA Hall of Fame. Their version was released as a single following the performance, and peaked at number 14.

In March 2016, Mauboy released the single "Where I'll Stay", which was used to promote the Seven Network's coverage of the 2016 Rio Olympics. Plans for Mauboy's upcoming fourth studio album were put on hold when she released her first individual soundtrack album, The Secret Daughter: Songs from the Original TV Series, on 14 October 2016. The album featured music used in the television series of the same name, in which Mauboy plays the lead role of Billie Carter. The album included five original songs and twelve cover versions of songs by Cold Chisel, Crowded House, The Clash, Roxette, Ed Sheeran and Alex Lloyd, among others. One of the original tracks, "Risk It", was released as the lead single from the soundtrack album. The Secret Daughter: Songs from the Original TV Series became Mauboy's first individual number-one album and also made her the first Indigenous artist to reach number one on the ARIA Albums Chart. Mauboy embarked on her third headlining tour, All the Hits Live – The Australian Tour, in March and April 2017, where she performed songs from the last 10 years of her career.

Mauboy's second individual soundtrack album, The Secret Daughter Season Two: Songs from the Original 7 Series, was released on 6 October 2017. The album included two original songs and sixteen covers of songs by The Church, Crowded House, Thirsty Merc, Paul Kelly, Lighthouse Family and Aretha Franklin, among others. Original track "Fallin'" was released as the album's lead single; it peaked at number 11, became Mauboy's sixteenth top-twenty hit, and was certified platinum. The Secret Daughter Season Two: Songs from the Original 7 Series debuted at number two and became Mauboy's fifth top-ten album. She received six nominations at the 2017 ARIA Music Awards, including Best Female Artist and Best Original Soundtrack, Cast or Show Album for The Secret Daughter, Best Australian Live Act, and Song of the Year, Best Pop Release and Best Video for "Fallin'".

On 11 December 2017, Mauboy was announced as the Australian representative for the Eurovision Song Contest 2018 in Portugal; becoming the fourth artist to compete for Australia. In May 2018, Mauboy performed the song "We Got Love" which finished in 20th position in the final.

=== 2019–2020: Hilda and Sony depart ===
On 11 April 2019, Mauboy released her new single "Sunday" from her upcoming fourth studio album, Hilda (October 2019). A video for the song was released on 30 April 2019, directed by Nick Waterman and produced by Jo Austin. The album's second single "Little Things" was released on 21 June along with the pre-order for the album. Hilda debuted at number one on the ARIA Albums Chart. In October 2019 "Little Things" was certified as an ARIA platinum single. The same month, "Selfish" impacted Australian radio as the third official single from Hilda.

In December 2020, Mauboy left Sony after fourteen years and signed a new record deal with Warner Music Australia, with new music to be released in 2021.

=== 2021–2024: Warner Music and Yours Forever ===
On 12 November 2021, Mauboy released "Glow", the first release on Warner Music Australia. On 27 April 2022, she announced the release of her second single "Automatic", stating "It's happening! My brand new single AUTOMATIC is out May 8th!". The music video for the track was also released on 8 May 2022, on her YouTube channel.

On 24 February 2023, Mauboy performed "Right Here Right Now" at Sydney World Pride 2023. It was released on 17 March 2023.

On 11 August 2023, Mauboy released "Give You Love" featuring Jason Derulo, as the lead single from her fifth studio album Yours Forever, released in February 2024. The album debuted at number 10 on the ARIA Charts.

=== 2025: Jamally and NIMA Hall of Fame ===
On 1 August 2025, Mauboy announced she had split from Warner and had established an independent label called Jamally. Her first single on this was released the same day titled "While I Got Time", a song synced on Network Seven's Home and Away, soundtracking the farewell of Lynne McGranger's character Irene Roberts.

The same month, Mauboy was inducted into the National Indigenous Music Awards Hall of Fame.

== Personal life ==
In late 2008, Mauboy moved from Darwin to Sydney, ahead of the release of her debut studio album Been Waiting. In January 2009, she began a long-distance relationship with Themeli "Magoo" Magripilis, a soccer player and council worker of Greek descent, who was born and raised in Darwin. Magripilis played for the Darwin soccer league's club Hellenic Athletic, the same club that Mauboy's younger sister Sophia played for. After seven years of long distance dating, Magripilis relocated from Darwin to Sydney in September 2016 and moved in with Mauboy. The couple wed in Darwin on 9 July 2022. Mauboy's first child was born in January 2025. When she is not working, Mauboy returns to Darwin to spend time with her family. She is an avid fan of NRL side North Queensland Cowboys.

== Artistry ==
=== Music and songwriting ===
Mauboy's music is generally R&B and pop, but she also incorporates dance, funk, soul and hip hop into some of her songs. Mauboy's debut studio album Been Waiting (2008) was described as "a blend of electro beats, heartfelt pop tunes and R&B bass lines". Most of the themes on the album dealt with boys, love and break-ups, everyday life, family issues, and friendship. Alasdair Duncan from Rave magazine described Mauboy's second studio album Get 'Em Girls (2010) as "a more hard-edged take on R&B and pop than her debut, pumped full of hip hop beats, jagged synths and futuristic vocal effects". Mauboy said that she wanted each song on the album to talk about a "woman's needs", and that the album's theme was "very much about the empowerment of women and the domination of women". Kylie Northover of The Sydney Morning Herald noted that Mauboy's third studio album Beautiful (2013) featured "a mix of more dance-oriented tunes and her usual R&B sound".

Mauboy has also incorporated her Aboriginal heritage into her music, including songs on the soundtrack album for The Sapphires and in the single "Sea of Flags". Aside from her vocals work, Mauboy can also play the piano and has co-written some of her material. She co-wrote eleven songs on her first studio album, nine on her second studio album, and fourteen on her third studio album. In 2010, Mauboy was nominated for Breakthrough Songwriter of the Year at the APRA Awards. Mauboy stated in an interview that while working with American producer Harvey Mason, Jr., they came up with the melodies and hooks for the songs "Fight for You" and "Here for Me" on the album Get 'Em Girls. She also experimented with an operatic-type voice on her song "Scariest Part".

=== Influences ===
Mauboy grew up listening to country singers Patsy Cline, Dolly Parton and Slim Dusty; she credits country music as her first love of music, saying the genre "is who I really, really am deeply". Mauboy also grew up listening to hip hop rappers Tupac Shakur, Dr. Dre and Snoop Dogg. Mauboy cites Mariah Carey as her main influence and inspiration, stating that she has "drawn a lot of inspiration from watching and listening to her live performances". She grew up listening to many of Carey's songs and was inspired by her vocal style and songwriting, "I loved 'Dreamlover' and 'Fantasy' – and picked up loads of tips from her style of singing. She taught me that the lyrics you write have to come from personal experiences – I really felt her music. Now I aspire to writing honest lyrics with real feelings that people can relate to." Mauboy also names Whitney Houston as another influence, stating that she looks up to her and Carey "for their outstanding vocal performances". Her other musical influences are John Farnham and Beyoncé. Mauboy is also inspired by fellow Indigenous Australian women such as Olympic gold medalist Cathy Freeman and actress Deborah Mailman.

=== Public image ===
Mauboy is known for her good girl image and is considered a role model to young girls and Indigenous communities in Australia. Ed Gibbs of The Sydney Morning Herald described her as a "wholesome girl-next-door", while Holly Richards of New Idea noted that she "is renowned for her squeaky-clean image and family values". Genevieve Rosen of The Vine wrote that Mauboy's "flawless public image is no farce. Humble, genuinely engaging and passionate about public service, Mauboy, put simply, is really nice." Anna Byrne of the Herald Sun observed, "It's clear this endearing unpretentiousness is not a fame facade. In every respect, the pint-sized pop star embodies one of the most elusive qualities of stardom: relatability. It's this genuineness that has seen her star ascend to where she actually is." Fashion has influenced Mauboy's music career and image. Byrne noted that her "fashion choices have mirrored her rise in fame, with her style evolving from shy schoolgirl to confident diva, set to steal the sartorial spotlight". Mauboy cites Jennifer Lopez as her style icon. She has worn dresses designed by Dolce & Gabbana, J'Aton, Steven Khalil and Toni Matičevski, and has appeared on the covers of fashion magazines in Australia, including Elle, InStyle, and Marie Claire. She has also appeared on the cover of Who magazine's Sexiest People issue twice; first in 2012 and again in 2016.

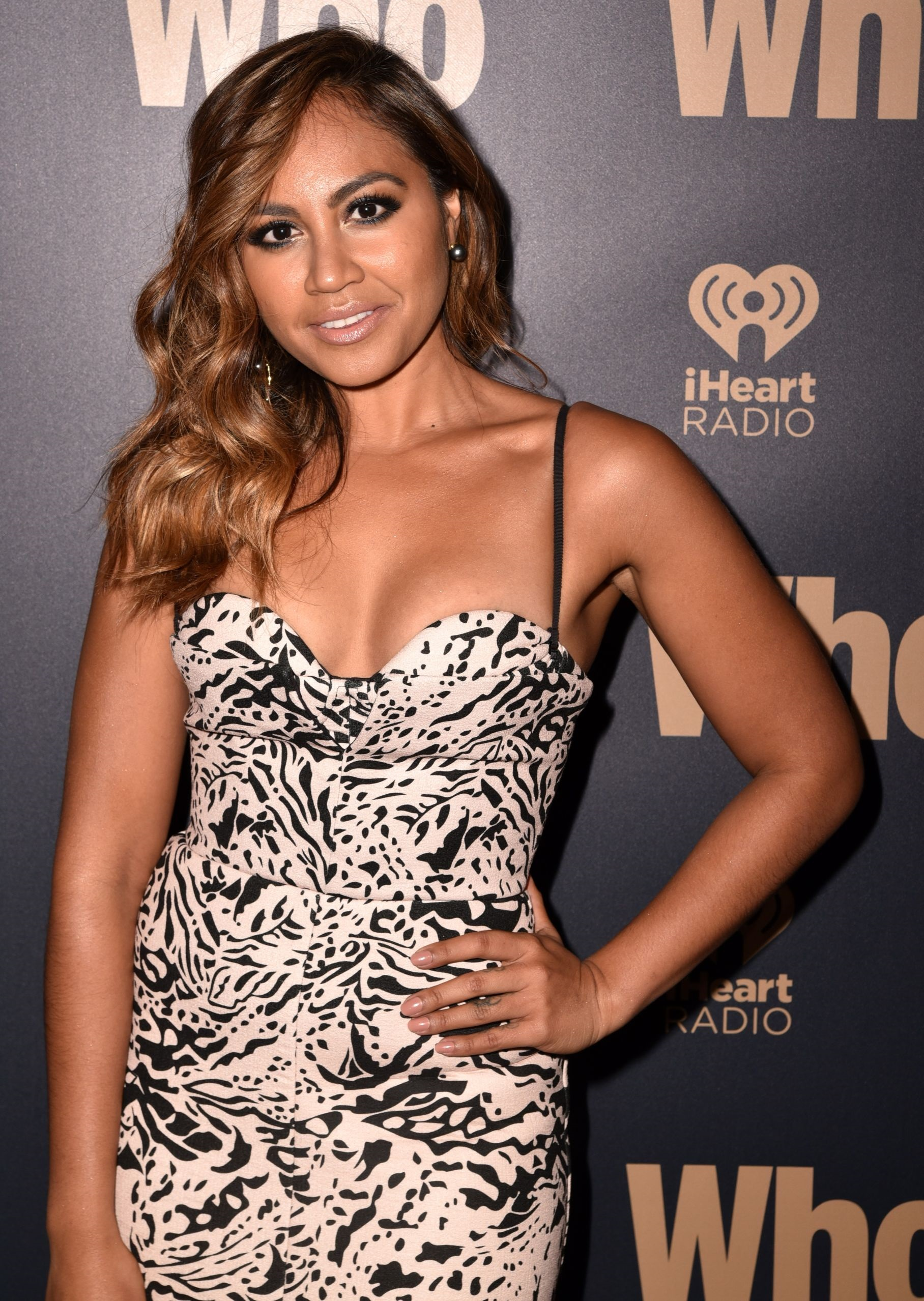
Mauboy at Who magazine's Sexiest People party in October 2014

Mauboy's weight has been the subject of media interest, ever since her rise to fame on Australian Idol when judge Kyle Sandilands publicly told her to "lose the jelly belly". Mauboy told Women's Health magazine that she was proud of her curvy figure, saying "having curves is one of my favourite things". In 2014, she received media attention for her weight loss transformation from a size 12 to 8. Mauboy has an alter ego named J Malley, who she described as her "fearless side" and "sort of like Beyoncé's Sasha Fierce". Mauboy is often referred to as Australia's answer to Beyoncé. However, she does not agree with the comparisons, saying "I totally disagree with that one. I've...watched her documentary [Life Is But a Dream] and was just blown away by how magnificent she really is and it's so inspiring for me. I just think she's fantastic and I'm completely nowhere near where she is, but I aspire to that."

With the release of Mauboy's second studio album Get 'Em Girls, some critics felt that she was becoming an "R&B sexpot". Both the album and its title track also received negative reviews from critics. The music video for the title track was heavily criticised by fans who felt that Mauboy had become too sexy and moved away from her good girl image. Speaking of Mauboy's image for R&B music, Fairfax Media journalist Bernard Zuel said: "It's a problem, matching the personality to a formula. The formula with young women singing modern R&B is that they have to be out there sexually, thrusting physically and vocally. But that's just not who she is." Following the release of her single "Gotcha" in 2012, Miranda Cashin of Sunshine Coast Daily noted that it was "a return to the Mauboy [we knew] before the infamous 2010 sexed-up fist-pumping album, Get 'Em Girls".

== Other ventures ==
=== Acting career ===
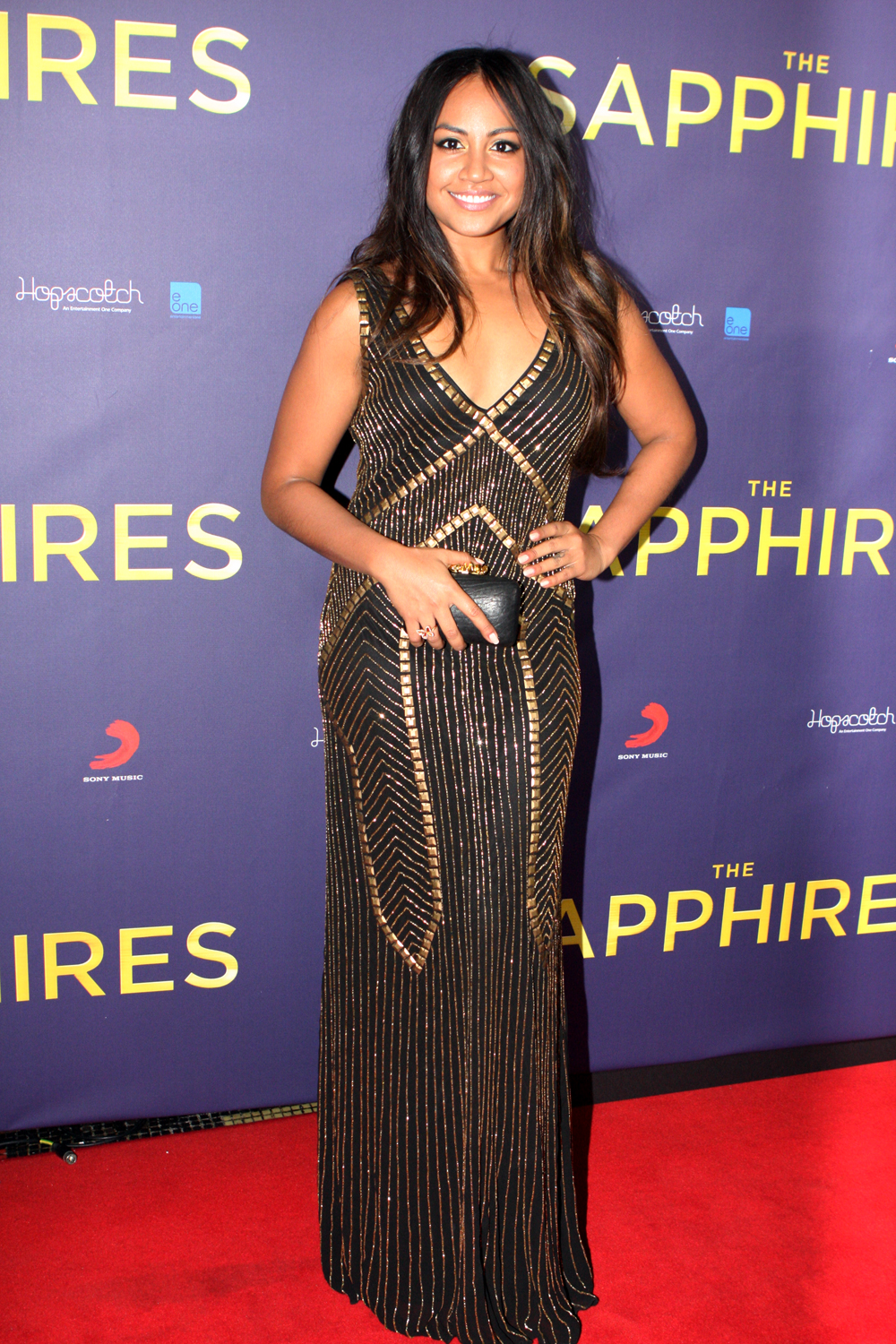
Mauboy at the Australian premiere of The Sapphires in August 2012

In January 2010, Mauboy made her acting debut in the film adaptation of the 1990 Aboriginal musical Bran Nue Dae. The film was directed by Rachel Perkins and also starred Ernie Dingo, Geoffrey Rush, Missy Higgins, and Deborah Mailman. In the film, Mauboy played the role of Rosie, a local church singer who has a love interest for a school boy named Willie (played by Rocky McKenzie). Her performance in the film earned her a nomination for Female Actress of the Year at the 2010 Deadly Awards. In November 2010, Mauboy made a guest appearance in the final episode of the mini-series Underbelly: Razor, and played the role of a nightclub singer named Gloria Starr.

In 2012, Mauboy had a lead role in The Sapphires, a film based on the stage show of the same name. It was directed by Wayne Blair and also starred Deborah Mailman, Shari Sebbens, and Miranda Tapsell. Mauboy played the role of Julie McCrae, one of the four Indigenous Australian women who travel to Vietnam to sing for the American troops. Mauboy and the cast attended the film's premiere at the 65th Annual Cannes Film Festival in Cannes, France, on 20 May 2012. Upon its release in the US, Mauboy appeared on The Ellen DeGeneres Show on 18 April 2013. Her performance in The Sapphires earned her the AACTA Award for Best Actress in a Supporting Role and the Australian Film Critics Association Award for Best Supporting Actress. In September 2013, Mauboy made a guest appearance as herself in the third and final season of the teen drama Dance Academy. In 2016, Mauboy was cast in the lead role of the television drama series The Secret Daughter, which premiered on the Seven Network on 3 October. It was Mauboy's first major TV role and was written especially for her. She portrayed the role of Billie Carter, a part-time country pub singer whose life changes after coming in contact with a rich hotelier. The role earned Mauboy her first Logie Award nomination for Best Actress, and the show was renewed for a second and final season in 2017. Mauboy guest starred in the 2016 season finale of Home and Away as herself, where she performed at the Summer Bay Groove Festival. In 2024, she starred in the Stan Australia film Windcatcher.

=== Endorsements ===
In 2007, Mauboy appeared in advertisements for the shampoo product, Head & Shoulders. In April 2009, she teamed up with Bloom Cosmetics to create two designer collection nail polishes, which included shades of sangria red and metallic green. Mauboy became the new face of the video game Nintendogs + Cats 3DS in October 2010, and joined forces with RSPCA and Nintendo to help promote the game. She teamed up with clothing label KuKu in December 2010 to launch her five-dress fashion range, which were made available to buy at Myer stores across Australia. In February 2013, Mauboy was announced as the ambassador for the National Rugby League (NRL) and featured in their television advertising campaign singing her cover version of Etta James' "Something's Got a Hold on Me", the theme song for the 2013 NRL season. The following month, Mauboy became the ambassador of the 2013 Woolworths Earn & Learn program, which enables primary and secondary schools in Australia as well as early learning centres to earn educational resources through the school community shopping at Woolworths. She appeared in two television commercials for the program, featuring students from Wulagi Primary School in Darwin. In 2014, Mauboy became the ambassador for the health and wellness company Swisse and appeared in a television commercial for Telstra's commitment to its customers campaign. In May 2015, she became the new face for Target Australia's Womenswear and represented the brand for a year. Mauboy's first fragrance, Be Beautiful, was released on 30 October 2015. The fragrance was developed by Mauboy in partnership with BrandPoint and was inspired by her hometown of Darwin. In February 2017, Mauboy became the ambassador for Foxtel's new Fox League channel dedicated to screening rugby league, and appeared in a television commercial to help launch the channel.

=== Philanthropy ===
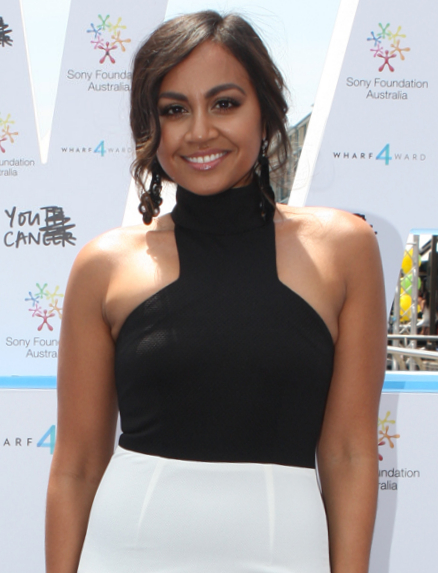
Mauboy at the Sony Foundation's Wharf4Ward event in October 2012

Throughout her career, Mauboy has supported various charities in Australia. She is an ambassador for the Sony Foundation, which raises funds for youth-related causes. As an ambassador for the Foundation, Mauboy has made several hospital visits and performed at many of their annual fundraising events such as Wharf4Ward, which raises funds to build specialised youth cancer centres across Australia. In April 2009, sales from the nail polish bottles Mauboy created with Bloom Cosmetics were donated to Children's Hospital Foundations Australia to support the research into childhood illness. Mauboy has performed at several other fundraising events including charity balls, charity dinners, Christmas carols events, and telethons. For many years, Mauboy has performed at the annual Channel Seven Perth Telethon. In December 2011, she performed free acoustic concerts across Australia as part of the Indian Pacific Outback Christmas train journey, an annual fund-raiser for the Royal Flying Doctor Service. On 14 December 2012, she performed a free pop up show at Federation Square in Melbourne, as part of the Optus Carols for a Cause event, which raised funds for Kids Helpline and The Smith Family. Mauboy headlined the Come Together charity concert in Ulverstone, Tasmania on 19 May 2013, in aid of two boys who were burnt in an explosion. All proceeds from the concert went into a trust fund for the boys' ongoing treatment.

Mauboy has also contributed to Indigenous organisations aimed at improving children's education. In 2009, she became a spokesperson for the Indigenous Literacy Project (ILP), which aims to provide "books and learning materials to schools, libraries and women's centres in remote areas". As spokesperson for the charity, Mauboy visited schools across Australia and talked to students about the importance of education. In 2011, she worked with the Yalari organisation "that offers children from regional, rural and remote communities and towns across Australia the opportunity to get a first-class secondary education". In 2013, Mauboy was appointed as the ambassador of the independent Aboriginal Yipirinya School in Alice Springs. Along with making several visits to the school, Mauboy has helped promote the school and assist with its fundraisings. In August 2015, she became an ambassador for the Indigenous Literacy Foundation, which raises support and awareness of literacy in remote indigenous communities. Her songs have been included on charity compilation albums such as Bushfire Aid: Artists for the Bushfire Appeal (2009), Spirit of Christmas (2009), and Flood Relief – Artists for the Flood Appeal (2011). Mauboy along with Guy Sebastian, Sheppard, Jon Stevens, Shannon Noll and Megan Washington were featured on Lee Kernaghan's 2015 charity single "Spirit of the Anzacs", which raised funds for Legacy and Soldier On.

=== Television ===
In December 2020, Mauboy was announced to have joined the judging panel of The Voice Australia for its tenth season to replace Boy George.

== Discography ==
- Been Waiting (2008)
- Get 'Em Girls (2010)
- Beautiful (2013)
- Hilda (2019)
- Yours Forever (2024)

== Filmography ==
=== Film appearances ===
Year	Title	Role	Notes
2009	Bran Nue Dae	Rosie	
2012	The Sapphires	Julie	
2015	Play All Day with Elmos	Kangaroo	
2024	Windcatcher	Aunty Cressida	

=== Television appearances ===
Year	Title	Role	Notes
2006	Australian Idol	Self	
2011	Underbelly	Gloria Starr	1 episode
2013	Dance Academy	Self	1 episode
2016	Home and Away	Self	2 episodes
2016–17	The Secret Daughter	Billie Carter	12 episodes
2017	Anh's Brush with Fame	Self	1 episode
2021–23	The Voice Australia	Self	
2022	The Voice: Generations Australia	Self	

== Tours ==
Headlining

- Galaxy Tour (with Stan Walker) (2012)
- To the End of the Earth Tour (2013–14)
- All the Hits Live – The Australian Tour (2017)
- The Boss Lady Tour (2022)
- Yours Forever Tour (2024)

Supporting act

- Beyoncé's I Am... World Tour: Australian leg (2009)
- Chris Brown's F.A.M.E. Tour: Australian leg (2011)

== See also ==
- List of awards and nominations received by Jessica Mauboy

Preceded by Isaiah with "Don't Come Easy"	Australia in the Eurovision Song Contest; 2018	Succeeded by Kate Miller-Heidke with "Zero Gravity"
