= Beautiful (Jessica Mauboy song) =

Single by Jessica Mauboy

from the album Beautiful
- Released: 22 November 2013
- Recorded: Rondor/Universal Recording Studio
- Genre: Dance
- Length: 3:12
- Label: Sony
- Songwriter(s): Jessica Mauboy; Charles Hinshaw; Chaz Mishan; David Delazyn
- Producer(s): The Fliptones

Jessica Mauboy singles chronology
"Pop a Bottle (Fill Me Up)" (2013)	"Beautiful" (2013)	"I Am Australian" (2014)

Music video
- "Beautiful" on YouTube

"Beautiful" is a song recorded by Australian singer Jessica Mauboy for her third studio album of the same name. The song was released for digital download on 22 November 2013, as the third single from the album. "Beautiful" was written by Mauboy, Charles Hinshaw, Chaz Mishan and David Delazyn, and produced by The Fliptones. Upon its release, "Beautiful" peaked at number 46 on the ARIA Singles Chart.

== Production ==
"Beautiful" was written by Jessica Mauboy, Charles Hinshaw, Chaz Mishan and David Delazyn, and produced by The Fliptones. The Fliptones also handled the programming and keys. Mauboy's vocals were recorded at Rondor/Universal Recording Studio. "Beautiful" was engineered by Stuart Schenk and mixed by James Royo. It was mastered by Tom Coyne at Sterling Sound in New York City. According to Janelle Tucknott of Renowned for Sound, the song features "heavy bass notes" and its instrumentation is provided by an electronic keyboard. "Beautiful" was made available for digital purchase on 22 November 2013.

== Reception ==
Janelle Tucknott of Renowned for Sound awarded "Beautiful" three-and-a-half stars out of five and wrote that "it's upbeat and catchy and begs to be played loudly while getting ready for a night out." Tucknott also described "Beautiful" as "the perfect Summer club track" and predicted it to be another hit for Mauboy. Jana Angeles of the same publication wrote that "Beautiful" is "an addictive track that is bound to be stuck in your head for days on end." She also noted that the song has "a summer lovin' feel" that would make "a perfect atmosphere for beaches and sunny weather." Entertainment Hive's Honey B described "Beautiful" as a "melodic high-energy number." The song debuted at number 66 on the ARIA Singles Chart dated 9 December 2013. The following week, it moved up to its peak position of number 46.

== Music video ==
The music video for "Beautiful" was directed by Tony Prescott and produced by Jane Griffin. It was uploaded to Mauboy's Vevo account on 4 December 2013. The video features intercut scenes of Mauboy singing in front of a backdrop of water and against a black backdrop. Other intercut scenes include Mauboy and her love interest in the kitchen making food, a group of people washing a car, children running with balloons, and a couple celebrating a birthday.

== Track listing ==
- Digital download
1. "Beautiful" – 3:12

== Credits and personnel ==
Credits adapted from the liner notes of Beautiful.

Locations

- Recorded at Rondor/Universal Recording Studio
- Mastered at Sterling Sound in New York City.

Personnel

- Songwriting – Jessica Mauboy, Charles Hinshaw, Chaz Mishan, David Delazyn
- Production – The Fliptones
- Mixing – James Royo
- Engineering – Stuart Schenk
- Mastering – Tom Coyne

== Charts ==
Chart (2013)	Peak position
Australia (ARIA)	46

== Release history ==
Country	Date	Format	Label
Australia	22 November 2013	Digital download	Sony Music Australia
