= Never Be the Same (Jessica Mauboy song) =

Single by Jessica Mauboy

from the album Beautiful
- Released: 7 March 2014
- Recorded: Sony Studios (Sydney, Australia)
- Genre: Pop; R&B
- Length: 3:52
- Label: Sony
- Songwriters: Jessica Mauboy; Anthony Egizii; David Musumeci
- Producer: DNA

Jessica Mauboy singles chronology
"I Am Australian" (2014)	"Never Be the Same" (2014)	"Sea of Flags" (2014)

Music video
- "Never Be the Same" on YouTube

"Never Be the Same" is a song recorded by Australian singer Jessica Mauboy. It was written by Mauboy, Anthony Egizii and David Musumeci, and produced by DNA. The song was released on 7 March 2014 as the fourth single from Mauboy's third studio album, Beautiful. "Never Be the Same" is a mid-tempo pop and R&B power ballad that speaks about "the confusion of growing up and the fact that changes in life are inevitable." The song received positive reviews from critics, who noted it as an emotional and powerful track and praised Mauboy's vocal performance.

"Never Be the Same" peaked at number six on the ARIA Singles Chart and became Mauboy's seventh top-ten single. It was certified Platinum by the Australian Recording Industry Association for selling over 70,000 copies. The accompanying music video was directed by Lawrence Lim and features Australian actress Miah Madden playing a younger version of Mauboy. The video received a positive reception from critics, who complimented the shower scenes and noted it as "an amazing step up" for Mauboy. "Never Be the Same" has been performed on Today and Sunrise, and was used to promote the American drama series Revenge on Australian television.

== Writing and production ==
"Never Be the Same" was written by Jessica Mauboy, Anthony Egizii and David Musumeci, and produced by Egizii and Musumeci under their production name DNA. It was the last song written for Mauboy's third studio album Beautiful. Mauboy's vocals were recorded at Sony Studios in Sydney. Egizii mixed the track and also handled the programming and keys. The audio mastering was done by Tom Coyne at Sterling Sound in New York City. Musically, "Never Be the Same" is a mid-tempo pop and R&B power ballad with lyrics about "the confusion of growing up and the fact that changes in life are inevitable."

Mauboy told The Canberra Times that "Never Be the Same" is her favourite track on the album and revealed that it "tells of a moment I had about doing something that is regretful but at the same time trying to race and fix it before it [was] too late!." In an interview with The Daily Telegraph, she said that it is the "most vulnerable" song she has ever sung, and added that she shocked DNA when she turned up angry for the writing session. "Those boys know me so well but I walked in there with so much anger and confidence about what I wanted to say, knowing how I wanted this song to be, that they paused for a moment."

== Release and reception ==
"Never Be the Same" was released as a video single on 7 March 2014. A CD single was released on 25 April 2014, featuring an exclusive acoustic version of the first single from Beautiful, "To the End of the Earth". Jana Angeles from Renowned for Sound described "Never Be the Same" as "an emotional track" and wrote that it is one of the songs on Beautiful that "have honest lyrics and are clearly spoken from the heart." Jamie Horne from The Border Mail noted that "Never Be the Same" showcases Mauboy's vocal skills, while the Australian Recording Industry Association called it "a powerful ballad." Suzie Keen from In Daily added that the song's lyrics, "Let me tell you 'bout a girl / that I used to be / Same name, same face / but a different me", explains the album's "feeling of defiance and strength" and "hints at the journey Mauboy has been on." 106.3FM called it "an emotionally charged song" that "shows off Mauboy's dynamic voice."

Upon its release, "Never Be the Same" debuted at number 21 on the ARIA Singles Chart issue dated 17 March 2014. The following week, it moved up to number 16, where it remained for two consecutive weeks. In its sixth week on the chart, the song peaked at number six and became Mauboy's seventh top-ten single. "Never Be the Same" was certified Platinum by the Australian Recording Industry Association for selling over 70,000 copies.

== Music video ==
=== Background ===
The music video was directed by Lawrence Lim and filmed on two days in March 2014.

A behind-the-scenes video of the shoot was posted on YouTube on 10 March 2014. The official video clip was uploaded to Mauboy's Vevo account on 17 March 2014. Miah Madden appears in the video as a young Mauboy. Madden previously played a younger version of Mauboy's character Julie McCrae in The Sapphires (2012).

In an interview with The Daily Telegraph, Mauboy revealed that thinking about her mother's struggle to search for her indigenous roots caused her to cry in the video, saying: "I think the most important thing in your life is knowing who you are and it was powerful to think of my mum and her not knowing where she had come from. So when I thought of my mum and what she has been through, the tears came on cue."

=== Synopsis and reception ===
The video begins with eerie music playing in the background while scenes of waves, dark clouds, a dark forest, a broken champagne glass and clothes being thrown in a suitcase are shown. Additional scenery includes a seesaw, a young girl playing on the swing, a dining room and a living room. As the song begins, Mauboy is seen singing the lyrics in various places including a hallway, on a bed, close-up into the camera, and half-naked in the shower. This is intercut with scenes of a younger Mauboy running through a dark forest. As the song comes to an end, both Mauboy and her younger self run to the beach where they meet and hug. During an interview with The Kyle and Jackie O Show, Mauboy said it was "a little fog from the steam" that was covering her private parts in the shower scenes.

Nova FM called it an "incredible video" and wrote "it's an amazing step up" from Mauboy. Carmarlena Murdaca of MusicFix described the shower scenes as "sultry" and suggested that Mauboy should "make it a soapy bubble bath next time." The video received a nomination at the 2014 ARIA Music Awards for Best Video.

== Live performances and usage in media ==
In March 2014, "Never Be the Same" was used to promote the American drama series Revenge on Australian television. Mauboy performed the song on Today (14 April 2014), Sunrise (16 May 2014) and at the 2014 InStyle Women of Style Awards (21 May 2014). On 7 July 2014, Elly Oh covered "Never Be the Same" during the third live show of the third season of The Voice Australia. Oh's version was released on the iTunes Store the following day. A live version of "Never Be the Same" was included on Mauboy's extended play iTunes Session, released on 18 July 2014. On 27 July 2014, Marlisa Punzalan covered the song during the bootcamp round of the sixth season of The X Factor Australia. Punzalan also performed the song with Mauboy during The X Factor Australia grand final performance show on 19 October 2014. Taiwanese singer Eve Ai recorded a Mandarin version of "Never Be the Same" for her album Grown Love, which was released on 16 October 2014.

== Track listing ==
- CD single
1. "Never Be the Same" – 3:52
2. "To the End of the Earth" (Acoustic)

== Credits and personnel ==
Credits adapted from the liner notes of Beautiful.

Locations

- Recorded at Sony Studios in Sydney, Australia.
- Mastered at Sterling Sound in New York City.

Personnel

- Songwriting – Jessica Mauboy, Anthony Egizii, David Musumeci
- Production – DNA
- Mixing – Anthony Egizii
- Programming and keys – Anthony Egizii
- Mastering – Tom Coyne

== Charts ==
=== Weekly chart ===
Chart (2014)	Peak position
Australia (ARIA)	6

=== Year-end charts ===
Chart (2014)	Position
Australia (ARIA)	75
Australian Artist Singles (ARIA)	17

== Certifications ==
Region	Certification	Certified units/sales
Australia (ARIA)	Platinum	70,000^{^}
^{^} Shipments figures based on certification alone.

== Release history ==
Country	Date	Format	Label
Australia	7 March 2014	Video single	Sony Music Australia
Australia	25 April 2014	CD single	Sony Music Australia
