= The Journey (Jessica Mauboy album) =

Live album by Jessica Mauboy
- Released: 24 February 2007
- Recorded: 2006
- Genres: Pop; R&B
- Length: 28:07
- Label: Sony BMG

Jessica Mauboy chronology
The Journey (2007)	Been Waiting (2008)

The Journey is a live album by 2006 Australian Idol runner-up Jessica Mauboy, released on 24 February 2007 by Sony BMG Australia. The CD/DVD contains recordings of Mauboy's live performances from her time in the top twelve on Australian Idol. Upon its release, The Journey debuted at number four on the ARIA Albums Chart and was certified gold by the Australian Recording Industry Association.

== Background and release ==
In 2006, Jessica Mauboy auditioned for the fourth season of Australian Idol, in Alice Springs, Northern Territory, singing "I Have Nothing" by Whitney Houston. Her audition impressed the judges, and she progressed to the semi-finals. Following the semi-final rounds, she advanced into the top twelve, and after progressing to the final two, Mauboy was announced as the runner-up to fellow contestant Damien Leith. Two weeks after the conclusion of Australian Idol, Mauboy signed a recording contract with Sony BMG Australia, and released The Journey in Australia on 24 February 2007. Released as a two-disc package, it contains re-recorded covers of the selected songs Mauboy performed as part of the top twelve on Australian Idol, and a DVD of her live performances in the series. The Journey debuted at number four on the ARIA Albums Chart and was certified gold by the Australian Recording Industry Association for shipments of 35,000 copies.

== Track listing ==
The Journey – Disc 1 (CD)
No.	Title	Writer(s)	Original artist	Length
1.	"Walk Away"	Kelly Clarkson; Kara DioGuardi; Chantal Kreviazuk; Raine Maida	Kelly Clarkson	1:43
2.	"Another Day in Paradise"	Phil Collins	Phil Collins	2:41
3.	"Impossible"	Alicia Keys	Christina Aguilera	2:39
4.	"Together Again"	René Elizondo Jr.; Janet Jackson; Jimmy Jam and Terry Lewis	Janet Jackson	2:30
5.	"Beautiful"	Linda Perry	Christina Aguilera	2:13
6.	"On the Radio"	Giorgio Moroder; Donna Summer	Donna Summer	2:36
7.	"Butterfly"	Walter Afanasieff; Mariah Carey	Mariah Carey	2:20
8.	"Have You Ever?"	Diane Warren	Brandy	3:03
9.	"Karma"	Keys; Kerry Brothers, Jr.; Taneisha Smith; Stevie Wonder	Alicia Keys	2:13
10.	"To Sir With Love"	Don Black; Mark London	Lulu	2:50
11.	"Words"	Barry Gibb; Maurice Gibb; Robin Gibb	Bee Gees	3:19
Total length:				28:07

The Journey – Disc 2 (DVD)
No.	Title	Writer(s)	Original artist(s)	Length
1.	"Stickwitu"	Franne Golde; Kasia Livingston; Robert D. Palmer	The Pussycat Dolls	1:49
2.	"Walk Away"	Clarkson; DioGuardi; Kreviazuk; Maida	Kelly Clarkson	1:38
3.	"Beautiful"	Perry	Christina Aguilera	2:02
4.	"Another Day in Paradise"	Collins	Phil Collins	2:32
5.	"On the Radio"	Moroder; Summer	Donna Summer	2:31
6.	"Have You Ever?"	Warren	Brandy	2:46
7.	"What the World Needs Now"	Burt Bacharach; Hal David	Jackie DeShannon	3:51
8.	"Crazy in Love"	Rich Harrison; Beyoncé Knowles; Eugene Record; Shawn Carter	Beyoncé featuring Jay-Z	2:17
9.	"Words"	B. Gibb; M. Gibb; R. Gibb	Bee Gees	3:10
10.	"Butterfly"	Afanasieff; Carey	Mariah Carey	2:09
11.	"Karma"	Keys; Brothers, Jr.; Smith; Wonder	Alicia Keys	2:10
12.	"When You Believe"	Babyface; Stephen Schwartz	Mariah Carey and Whitney Houston	2:40
13.	"To Sir With Love"	Black; London	Lulu	2:41
14.	"Night of My Life"	Adam Reily	Damien Leith and Jessica Mauboy	3:28
15.	"Impossible"	Keys	Christina Aguilera	2:22
16.	"Together Again"	Elizondo, Jr.; Jackson; Jam; Lewis	Janet Jackson	2:28

== Charts ==
Chart (2007)	Peak position
Australian Albums (ARIA)	4

== Certifications ==
Region	Certification	Certified units/sales
Australia (ARIA)	Gold	35,000^{^}
^{^} Shipments figures based on certification alone.

== Release history ==
Region	Date	Format	Label	Catalogue
Australia	24 February 2007	CD + DVD	Sony BMG Australia	88697047952
