= To the End of the Earth =

2013 song by Jessica Mauboy

Single by Jessica Mauboy

from the album Beautiful
- Released: 17 July 2013
- Recorded: Captain Cuts Studios (Los Angeles, California)
- Genre: Dance-pop
- Length: 3:07
- Label: Sony
- Songwriters: Jessica Mauboy; Jaden Michaels; Ben Berger; Ryan McMahon
- Producers: Ben Berger; Ryan McMahon

Jessica Mauboy singles chronology
"Something's Got a Hold on Me" (2013)	"To the End of the Earth" (2013)	"Pop a Bottle (Fill Me Up)" (2013)

Music video
- "To the End of the Earth" on YouTube

"To the End of the Earth" is a song recorded by Australian singer Jessica Mauboy. The song was digitally released on 17 July 2013, as the lead single from Mauboy's third studio album Beautiful. It was written by Mauboy, Jaden Michaels, Ben Berger and Ryan McMahon, and produced by the latter two. The uptempo dance-pop song received positive reviews from critics, who commended the production. "To the End of the Earth" peaked at number 21 on the ARIA Singles Chart and was certified gold by the Australian Recording Industry Association for selling over 35,000 copies. The track was promoted by performances at the 2013 State of Origin decider, on Sunrise and at Westfield Knox and Westfield Hurstville. The accompanying music video was directed by Emma Tomelty and filmed in Alice Springs. The video received a positive reception from critics, particularly for its presentation.

== Background and release ==
"To the End of the Earth" was written by Jessica Mauboy, Jaden Michaels, Ben Berger and Ryan McMahon. The production was handled by Berger and McMahon of Captain Cuts, who are known for remixing tracks for Britney Spears, Ellie Goulding and Marina and the Diamonds. Mauboy's vocals were recorded at Captain Cuts Studios in Los Angeles, California. The song was engineered by Captain Cuts and mixed by Miles Walker. It was mastered by Tom Coyne at Sterling Sound in New York City. The uptempo dance-pop song was inspired by Mauboy being homesick. She told News Limited, "I was two weeks into the writing session and wanted to write something about home. I was missing home a lot. 'To the End of the Earth' made sense because everything I do connects to back home, to my place in the world." During the sessions, Mauboy asked the producers to make changes to the song, which included removing the dubstep beats to focus more on her voice.

"To the End of the Earth" was made available for digital purchase on 17 July 2013. A CD single was released on 2 August 2013; it includes two remixes of "To the End of the Earth", the bonus track "Over and Over", and a 6 panel fold-out poster.

== Reception ==
"To the End of the Earth" received positive reviews from critics. Mike Wass from Idolator described it as a "killer dance track" and noted that Mauboy's "powerful pipes aren't overpowered by the slick house beats and the towering chorus will be a hit in clubs and on radio." Take 40 Australia wrote that the song "definitely has a super catchy big pop sound!", while Lars Brandle from Billboard magazine noted it as a "club-vibe song." Chris Urankar from InStyle magazine called the track a "euphoric dance-pop ditty" that features "infectious, Calvin Harris-style beats." Adam Bub from Ninemsn's TheFix viewed "To the End of the Earth" as a "sizzling new dance anthem" and added that fellow Australian singer Kylie Minogue should watch out.

The Music Network noted it as "a decidedly different sounding track" from Mauboy's "'60s-leaning soul vocals" on The Sapphires soundtrack. "To the End of the Earth" earned Mauboy the Best Female Artist accolade at the 2013 ARIA Music Awards, and was nominated for "World's Best Song" at the 2014 World Music Awards. Upon its release, the song debuted at number 22 on the ARIA Singles Chart issue dated 29 July 2013, but fell to number 32 the following week. It peaked at number 21 in the issue dated 12 August 2013. "To the End of the Earth" was certified gold by the Australian Recording Industry Association for selling over 35,000 copies.

== Music video ==
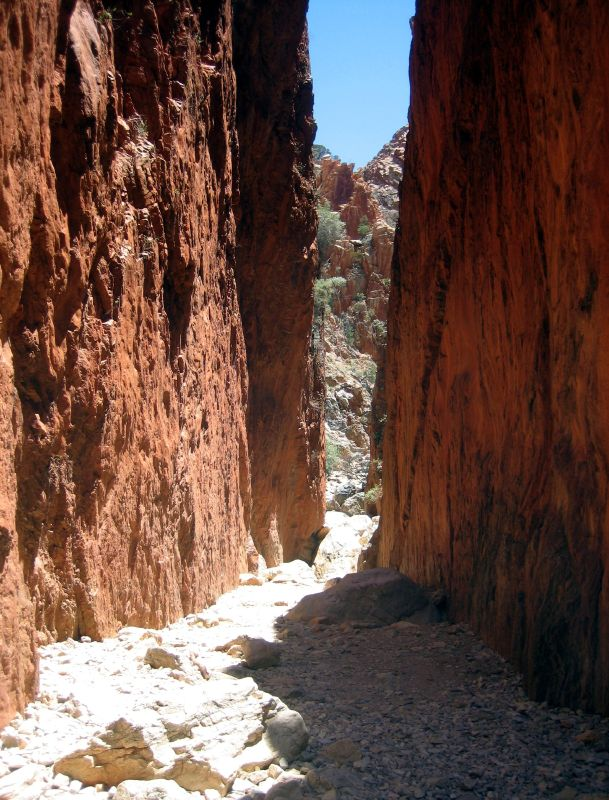
Some scenes in the music video were filmed at Standley Chasm in West MacDonnell National Park.

The accompanying music video was directed by Emma Tomelty, who previously directed the music videos for Ricki-Lee's "Do It Like That" and Hermitude's "Speak of the Devil". It was filmed in July 2013 at several locations around Alice Springs including the West MacDonnell National Park. The electric blue 1969 Holden Monaro used in the video belonged to local sheet metal worker Jack Speares. Model Delroy Craig portrayed Mauboy's love interest in the video. A teaser of the clip, which featured scenes of Mauboy singing in a desert and being intimate with her love interest, was shown on Sunrise on 2 August 2013. A second teaser was posted on YouTube on 4 August 2013 and featured Mauboy singing in front of a rippling sheet in the desert. The official video clip was uploaded to Mauboy's Vevo account the following day.

The video begins with Craig driving a Holden Monaro while Mauboy sits in the passenger seat; Craig stops the vehicle on the side of an after-dark highway. As the song begins, Mauboy exits the car and does a teasing dance for him in front of the car with the headlights on. The video then changes to daytime and features intimate scenes of Mauboy and Craig on the bonnet of the car, as well scenes of Mauboy singing in the desert and at the rock formations of Standley Chasm. Towards the end of the video, Mauboy is seen singing on top of a rocky mountain range.

Mike Wass from Idolator called it an "epic video" and wrote, "Not only does the rugged landscape offer a striking backdrop for a music video, it also works as an unintentional advert for tourism Australia." Chris Urankar from InStyle described the video as an "earthy and epic piece." Nova FM praised Mauboy's love interest in the video, calling him "smoking hot." Adam Bub from TheFix also praised her love interest by calling him a "spunky model", and noted that Mauboy "is at her most beautiful in the lavishly produced clip."

== Live performances ==
Mauboy performed "To the End of the Earth" for the first time at the 2013 State of Origin decider, held at ANZ Stadium in Sydney on 17 July 2013. She performed, with backup dancers wearing leather outfits, to a crowd of more than 82,000 prior to the game's kick-off. According to Armchair Guru from Sports Banter, Mauboy lip-synched her performance. She also performed the track on Sunrise (30 July 2013) and during instore appearances at Westfield Knox in Wantirna South, Victoria (2 August 2013) and Westfield Hurstville in Hurstville, New South Wales (8 August 2013). "To the End of the Earth" was also part of the set list of Mauboy's To the End of the Earth Tour.

== Track listing ==
- Digital download
1. "To the End of the Earth" – 3:07
- CD single
1. "To the End of the Earth" – 3:07
2. "To the End of the Earth" (Supasound Club Remix)
3. "To the End of the Earth" (Supasound Dubstramental Remix)
4. "Over and Over"

== Credits and personnel ==
Credits adapted from the liner notes of Beautiful.

Location

- Recorded at Captain Cuts Studios in Los Angeles, California.
- Mastered at Sterling Sound in New York City.

Personnel

- Vocals – Jessica Mauboy
- Songwriting – Jessica Mauboy, Jaden Michaels, Ben Berger, Ryan McMahon
- Production – Ben Berger, Ryan McMahon
- Mixing – Miles Walker
- Engineering – Captain Cuts
- Mastering – Tom Coyne

== Charts ==
=== Weekly charts ===
Chart (2013)	Peak position
Australia (ARIA)	21

=== Year-end charts ===
Chart (2013)	Position
Australian Artist Singles Chart	21

== Certification ==
Region	Certification	Certified units/sales
Australia (ARIA)	Gold	35,000^{^}
^{^} Shipments figures based on certification alone.

== Release history ==
Country	Date	Format	Label	Catalogue
Australia	17 July 2013	Digital download	Sony Music Australia	
Australia	2 August 2013	CD	Sony Music Australia	88883766472
