= Pop a Bottle (Fill Me Up) =

Single by Jessica Mauboy

from the album Beautiful
- Released: 27 September 2013
- Recorded: The Highlands (Hollywood, California)
- Genre: Dance-pop; electropop
- Length: 3:43
- Label: Sony
- Songwriters: Jessica Mauboy; Mario Marchetti; Gino Barletta; Rebecca Johnson
- Producer: Mario Marchetti

Jessica Mauboy singles chronology
"To the End of the Earth" (2013)	"Pop a Bottle (Fill Me Up)" (2013)	"Beautiful" (2013)

Music video
- "Pop a Bottle (Fill Me Up)" on YouTube

"Pop a Bottle (Fill Me Up)" is a song recorded by Australian singer Jessica Mauboy for her third studio album, Beautiful. The song was digitally released on 27 September 2013, as the second single from the album. "Pop a Bottle (Fill Me Up)" was written by Mauboy, Mario Marchetti, Gino Barletta and Rebecca Johnson, and produced by Marchetti. The song received positive reviews from critics, many of whom complimented it as an anthem.

"Pop a Bottle (Fill Me Up)" debuted at number two on the ARIA Singles Chart, becoming Mauboy's highest-charting single since 2008's "Burn". It also debuted at number 33 on the New Zealand Singles Chart. The song was certified platinum by the Australian Recording Industry Association for selling over 70,000 copies. The accompanying music video was directed by Megan Brown and filmed in various locations around Wollongong. It features Mauboy spending time with her girlfriends. Mauboy promoted the song with performances on television and during her To the End of the Earth Tour.

== Production and release ==
16-second sample from the chorus of Jessica Mauboy's "Pop a Bottle (Fill Me Up)"

"Pop a Bottle (Fill Me Up)" was written by Jessica Mauboy, Mario Marchetti, Gino Barletta and Rebecca Johnson, and produced by Marchetti. Barletta and Marchetti also handled the vocal production with Bekuh BOOM. Mauboy's vocals were recorded at The Highlands in Hollywood, California. The song was engineered by Barletta and Boom, and mixed by Mitch McCarthy. It was mastered by Tom Coyne at Sterling Sound in New York City. Mauboy spoke about "Pop a Bottle (Fill Me Up)" in an interview with Take 40 Australia, saying: "It's such a fun and really colourful song ... It speaks about just being a risk taker, and just letting loose. And I think that's just part of my personality that I like to express. Being able to have a bit of a joke ... and a bit of a laugh." "Pop a Bottle (Fill Me Up)" was made available for digital purchase on 27 September 2013. A live version of the song was included on Mauboy's extended play iTunes Session (2014).

== Reception ==
Chris Urankar from InStyle magazine described the song as a "summery, radio-ready anthem", while Take 40 Australia called it "an awesome party anthem!." A writer from MusicFix complimented "Pop a Bottle (Fill Me Up)" as a "fun weekend jam" and predicted the song to be another hit for Mauboy. Mike Wass from Idolator wrote that the track "feels like an even better fit" for Mauboy than her previous single "To the End of the Earth". Shayne of Flopstar Reviews described "Pop a Bottle (Fill Me Up)" as "a bland but pleasant jam" and felt that it was reminiscent of One Direction and Katy Perry's pop rock style. He also noted that the song's lyrics are not about sex "as the title suggests" and that it is "actually about how some guy is super nice" to Mauboy "and it makes her happy".

"Pop a Bottle (Fill Me Up)" was nominated for "World's Best Song" at the 2014 World Music Awards. The song debuted and peaked at number two on the ARIA Singles Chart dated 7 October 2013, and became Mauboy's sixth top-ten single. It was barred from the #1 spot by Katy Perry's "Roar". That same week, "Pop A Bottle (Fill Me Up)" debuted and peaked at number 33 on the New Zealand Singles Chart, becoming Mauboy's highest-charting single in New Zealand. "Pop a Bottle (Fill Me Up)" was certified Platinum by the Australian Recording Industry Association for selling over 70,000 copies. "Pop A Bottle (Fill Me Up)" spent a total of 15 consecutive weeks in the ARIA Top 50.

== Music video ==
=== Background and synopsis ===
The music video was directed by Megan Brown and filmed in various locations around Wollongong, including Bald Hill, North Gong Beach and Sea Cliff Bridge, in August 2013. A one-minute teaser of the video was posted on YouTube on 18 September 2013, featuring scenes of Mauboy at an outdoor party. The official video clip was uploaded to Mauboy's Vevo account on 25 September 2013. The video begins with Mauboy in her dressing room getting ready for a photo shoot, but she decides to leave after receiving a phone call from her girlfriends. As the song begins, Mauboy is seen in her apartment putting clothes in a bag and then at a sidewalk near the beach waiting for her friends to pick her up. When they arrive, she gets into the backseat of the car and continues singing. Mauboy and her friends are then seen on a hill dancing and taking pictures. As the video changes to nighttime, they arrive at an outdoor party and Mauboy continues singing and dancing.

=== Reception ===
Mike Wass from Idolator described the video as "a fairly simple affair" and noted that Mauboy "looks pretty and there's some nice scenery." Take 40 Australia praised Mauboy for keeping the video PG-rated "unlike a lot of artists these days." Chris Urankar from InStyle magazine noted that in the video, she is "in amped-up party mode." Nova FM called it a "carefree" video. Shayne of Flopstar Reviews felt that the video featured "the blandest white people party of all time" with scenes "of white people at a picnic getting turnt on soda pop and waving their arms to pop/rock." The video was nominated for "World's Best Video" at the 2014 World Music Awards.

== Live performances ==
Mauboy promoted "Pop a Bottle (Fill Me Up)" with performances on The X Factor Australia (30 September 2013), at the 27th ARIA Music Awards (1 December 2013), and on Sunrise (18 December 2013). Mauboy also performed the song at the 2013 NRL Grand Final. The song was also part of the set list of her To the End of the Earth Tour. On 16 May 2014, Mauboy performed "Pop a Bottle (Fill Me Up)" again on Sunrise from the Royal Botanic Gardens, Sydney.

On New Year's Eve 2023, Mauboy performed Pop a Bottle live on the ABC stage outside the Sydney Opera House in the countdown to midnight.

== Track listing ==
- Digital download
1. "Pop a Bottle (Fill Me Up)" – 3:43

== Credits and personnel ==
Credits adapted from the liner notes of Beautiful.

Location

- Recorded at The Highlands in Hollywood, California.
- Mastered at Sterling Sound in New York City.

Personnel

- Songwriting – Jessica Mauboy, Mario Marchetti, Gino Barletta, Rebecca Johnson
- Production – Mario Marchetti
- Mixing – Mitch McCarthy
- Engineering – Gino Barletta, Bekuh Boom
- Vocal Production – Gino Barletta, Mario Marchetti, Bekuh Boom
- Mastering – Tom Coyne

== Charts ==
=== Weekly charts ===
Chart (2013)	Peak position
Australia (ARIA)	2
New Zealand (Recorded Music NZ)	33

=== Year-end charts ===
Chart (2013)	Position
ARIA Singles Chart	91
Australian Artist Singles Chart	12

== Certification ==
Region	Certification	Certified units/sales
Australia (ARIA)	Platinum	70,000^{^}
^{^} Shipments figures based on certification alone.

== Release history ==
Country	Date	Format	Label
Australia	27 September 2013	Digital download	Sony Music Australia
New Zealand	27 September 2013	Digital download	Sony Music Australia
