= Renowned for Sound =

Australian online music magazine

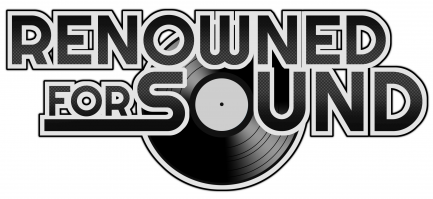
- Website type: Online magazine
- Available in: English
- Creators: Brendon Veevers, Robert Lee
- Website: renownedforsound.com
- Commercial: Yes
- Registration: Not required
- Launched: March 1, 2013; 13 years ago
- Current status: Active

Renowned for Sound is an Australian online magazine that publishes music reviews, articles, and interviews with artists.

The website was founded on 1 March 2013 by Australian music journalist Brendon Veevers and technical director Robert Lee.

== Rating system ==
Renowned for Sound operates a simple five-star rating system, starting at 1 and allowing for 1/2 intervals. Users are not allowed to vote.
