= DNA Songs =

Australian songwriting and production duo

- Origin: Australia
- Genres: Pop, dance-pop, pop-rock
- Occupations: Songwriter, record producer
- Years active: 2004–present
- Members: Anthony Egizii; David Musumeci
- Website: www.dnasongs.com.au

DNA Songs is a songwriting and production company founded by Anthony Egizii and David Musumeci in Australia in 2004. They have worked with a variety of international and local artists including Ricky Martin, Geri Halliwell, The Veronicas, Guy Sebastian, Delta Goodrem, The Saturdays, Jessica Mauboy, Timomatic, Shannon Noll and many others. They have had seven No.1 singles in Australia with The Veronicas' "You Ruin Me" and "In My Blood", as well as Delta Goodrem's single "Wings", Reece Mastin's "Good Night" and "Shout It Out", Samantha Jade's "What You've Done to Me" and Dami Im's "Alive".

DNA Songs have also written numerous songs entered in the Eurovision Song Contest by Australia with "Sound of Silence" by Dami Im in 2016, "Don't Come Easy" by Isaiah Firebrace in 2017, "We Got Love" by Jessica Mauboy in 2018 and "Don't Break Me" by Montaigne in 2020.

== Songwriting credits ==
- "I Hate That it's True" - Dean Lewis (2025)
- "Thinking 'Bout Us" - Dannii Minogue (2024)
- "I'm Sorry" - Jessica Mauboy (2024)
- "Ghost" - Ricki-Lee (2024)
- "On My Own" - Ricki Lee (2024)
- "Point Of No Return" - Ricki-Lee (2023)
- "Worst Taste in Girls" - Charley (2023)
- "Human" - The Veronicas (2021)
- "Goodbye" - The Veronicas (2021)
- "Movie Star" - The Veronicas (2021)
- "Play" - Delta Goodrem (2021)
- "Don't Break Me" - Montaigne (2020)
- "Biting My Tongue" - The Veronicas (2020)
- "We Got Love" - Jessica Mauboy (2018)
- Let Me Love You from Best Of My Love by Samantha Jade (2018)
- "Don't Come Easy" - Isaiah Firebrace (2017)
- " Ugly"- The Veronicas (2019)
- "It's Gotta Be You" - Isaiah Firebrace (2016)
- "Risk It" – Jessica Mauboy (2016)
- "Fighting for Love" - Dami Im (2016)
- "In My Blood" – The Veronicas (2016)
- "Dear Life" – Delta Goodrem (2016)
- "Sound of Silence" – Dami Im (2016)
- "Keep Talking" – Cyrus Villanueva (2016)
- "Coming Back" - Dean Ray (2015)
- "Wings" – Delta Goodrem (2015)
- "Always Be Yours" – Nathaniel Willemse (2015)
- "Shut Your Mouth" – Kate DeAraugo (2015)
- "Flava" – Nathaniel Willemse (2015)
- "If You Love Someone" – The Veronicas (2014)
- "Rise & Fall" – Justice Crew (2014)
- "Stand by You" – Marlisa (2014)
- "You Ruin Me" – The Veronicas (2014)
- "Live Louder" – Nathaniel Willemse (2014)
- "You're Beautiful" – Nathaniel Willemse (2014)
- "The Edge" - Tonight Alive (2014)
- "Soldier" – Samantha Jade (2013)
- "Alive" – Dami Im (2013)
- "Never Be the Same" – Jessica Mauboy (2013)
- "Barriers" – Jessica Mauboy (2013)
- "You" – Nathaniel Willemse (2013)
- "Not Giving Up" – The Saturdays (2013)
- "Half of Me" – Geri Halliwell (2013)
- "Firestarter" – Samantha Jade (2013)
- "Come With Me" – Ricky Martin (2013)
- "It's Worth It" – Jackie Thomas (2013)
- "Another Life" – The Collective (2013)
- "What You've Done To Me" – Samantha Jade (2012)
- "Shut Up & Kiss Me" – Reece Mastin (2012)
- "Shout It Out" – Reece Mastin (2012)
- "Love Sex Goddess" – DaniElle DeLaite (2012)
- "Are You Ready" – Marvin Priest (2012)
- "Take It Home" – Johnny Ruffo (2012)
- "Surrender" – The Collective (2012)
- "If Looks Could Kill" – Timomatic (2012)
- "Last To Go" – Anthony Callea (2012)
- "Good Night" – Reece Mastin (2011)
- "Path of Gold" – Shannon Noll (2011)
- "Set It Off" – Timomatic (2011)
- "Music Won't Break Your Heart" – Stan Walker (2011)
- "Who We Are" – Stan Walker (2011)
- "Own This Club" – Marvin Priest (2011)
- "Feel the Love" – Marvin Priest (2011)
- "Cherry Pop" – Kate Alexa (2010)
- "Chemical Rush" – Brian McFadden (2010)
- "Love Transfusion" – Brian McFadden (2010)
- "Less Talk" – Brian McFadden (2010)
- "When You Coming Home" – Brian McFadden (2010)
- "It's Alright" – Kate Alexa (2008)
- "Chinese Whispers" – Jessica Mauboy (2008)
- "Runnin'" – Jessica Mauboy (2008)
- "Fading Picture" – Amy Pearson (2008)
- "Where We Belong" – Kate Alexa (2007)
- "Tonight" – Kate Alexa (2007)
- "Waiting Here" – Kate Alexa (2007)
- "You're Everything" – Kate Alexa (2007)
- "Another Now" – Kate Alexa (2007)
- "Help Me Find a Way" – Kate Alexa (2007)
- "Nobody Knows" – Kate Alexa (2007)
- "Won't Walk Away" – Kate Alexa (2007)
- "We Are Together" – Kate Alexa (2007)
- "Feel It Too" – Kate Alexa (2007)
- "Way to the Top" – Kate Alexa (2007)
- "Falling Out" – Kate Alexa (2007)
- "Can't Be You" – Dean Geyer (2007)
- "Won't Let You Go" – Shannon Noll (2007)
- "Tomorrow" – Shannon Noll (2007)
- "Don't Miss You" – Amy Pearson (2007)
- "Love Like This" – Amy Pearson (2007)
- "Alone No More" – Ricki-Lee (2007)
- "Let Go" – Amity Dry (2005)
- "Too Late" – Amity Dry (2005)
- "Nobody Knows" – Torsten Fassbender featuring Julie-Anne Melfi

== Production and mixing credits ==
=== Delta Goodrem ===
- "Wings" - Single From Wings of the Wild (2015)
- "Dear Life" - Single From Wings of the Wild (2016)
- "In the Name of Love" from Wings of the Wild (2016)
- "Hold On" from Wings of the Wild (2016)
- "Play" from Bridge Over Troubled Dreams (2021)

=== The Veronicas ===
- "You Ruin Me" - Single (2014)
- "If You Love Someone" - Single (2014)

From their album The Veronicas

- "In My Blood" (2016) from Godzilla (2021)
- "Ugly" (2019) from Blood Is For Life (2019)
- "Biting My Tongue" (2020) from Human (2021)
- "Human" from Human (2021)
- "Movie Star" from Human (2021)
- "Goodbye" from Human (2021)

=== Ricki-Lee Coulter ===
- "Hell No!"
- "Something About You Babe"
- "Breathe"
- "Stay with Me"
- "Done with It"

from the album Ricki-Lee (2005)

- "Take Me to a Place"

from the album Brand New Day (2007)

- "I Was Made for Loving You" (Kiss cover)
- Ghost
- On My Own
- Magic
- Dance Like No-One's Watching
- More Then Love
- Talkin'
- What Do You Want From Me?'
- Point Of No Return (With David Schufer), Real Love (With Ivy Adara)

from the album On My Own (2024)

=== Samantha Jade ===
- "What You've Done to Me" – Single (2012)
- "Firestarter" – Single (2013)
- "Soldier" – Single (2013)
- "Naked" from her album 'Nine' (2015)
- Only Just Begun from her album Nine (2015)
- Let Me Love You from her album Best of My Love (2018)

=== Nathaniel ===
- "You" – Single (2013)
- "You're Beautiful" – Single (2014)
- "Live Louder" - Single (2014)
- "Always Be Yours" - Single (2015)

and the debut studio album, Yours (2015).

=== Reece Mastin ===
- "Good Night" – Single (2011) from Reece Mastin
- Shut Up And Kiss Me (2012) (Single) from Beautiful Nightmare album
- Shout It Out (2012) (single) from Beautiful Nightmare album
- Timeless (2012) from Beautiful Nightmare album
- Outta My Face (2012) from Beautiful Nightmare album

=== The Collective ===
- "Surrender" – Single (2012)
- "Another Life" – Single (2013)

=== Jessica Mauboy ===
- "I'm Sorry" from Yours Forever (2024)

=== Ricki-Lee Coulter ===
- "Hell No!"
- "Something About You Babe"
- "Breathe"
- "Stay with Me"
- "Done with It"

from the album Ricki-Lee (2005)

- "Take Me to a Place"

from the album Brand New Day (2007)

- "I Was Made for Loving You" (Kiss cover)

from the album On My Own (2024)

=== Ricky Martin ===
- "Come With Me" – Single (2013)

=== Johnny Ruffo ===
- "On Top" – Single (2012)
- "Take It Home" – Single (2012)

=== Guy Sebastian ===
- "Don't Worry Be Happy" – Single (2011)

=== Timomatic ===
- "Set It Off" – Single (2011)

=== Stan Walker ===
- "Music Won't Break Your Heart"
- "Who We Are"

from the album Let the Music Play (2011)

=== Shannon Noll ===
- "Path of Gold"

from the album A Million Suns (2011)

=== Marvin Priest ===
- "Own This Club"
- "Feel The Love"

from the album Beats & Blips (2011)

=== Zoë Badwi ===
- "Freefallin" – Single (2010) (Vocal Recording and Vocal Production)

=== Christine Anu ===
- "Come Home" – Single (2010)

=== Brian McFadden ===
- "Chemical Rush"
- "Love Transfusion"
- "Less Talk"
- "When You Coming Home"

from the album Wall of Soundz (2010)

=== Jessica Mauboy ===
- "Chinese Whispers"
- "Runnin'"

from the album Been Waiting (2008)

- "Never Be the Same"
- "Barriers"

from the album Beautiful (2013)

- "Risk It"
- "Something About You"

from the TV series The Secret Daughter (2016)

- "We Got Love"

representing Australia in the Eurovision Song Contest 2018

- "Little Things"
- "Blessing"
- "Come Runnin'"
- "Selfish"
- "Tough Love"
- "Who We're Meant to Be"

from the album Hilda (2019)

- "I'm Sorry"
- "Tell 'Em"

from the album Yours Forever (2024)

=== Shannon Noll ===
- "Tomorrow"

from the album Turn It Up (2007)

=== Amy Pearson ===
- "Don't Miss You"
- "Love Like This"
- "Not Me"
- "Does Anybody?"
- "Wish I Was Her"
- "Fool"

from the album Who I Am (2008)

=== Dean Geyer ===
- "Can't Be You"

from the album Rush (2007)

=== Guy Sebastian ===
- "Cover on My Heart"

from the album Closer to the Sun (2006)

=== Kate Miller-Heidke ===
- "Make It Last"

from the album Little Eve (2007)

=== Old Man River ===
- "Sunshine" (DNA Remix)

from the album Good Morning (2007)

=== Kate Alexa ===
- "Where We Belong"
- "Tonight"
- "Waiting Here"
- "You're Everything"
- "Another Now"
- "Help Me Find a Way"
- "Nobody Knows"
- "Won't Walk Away"
- "We Are Together"
- "Feel It Too"
- "Way to the Top"
- "Falling Out"

from the album H2O: Just Add Water (2007)

- "It's Alright"

B-Side of the single Teardrops (2008)

=== Amity Dry ===
- True to Me

=== Brielle Davis ===
- "Take It Off"
- "Oxygen" (DNA Remix)

from the album Other Side (2007)

=== Torsten Fassbender Featuring Julie-Anne Melfi ===
- "Nobody Knows"

=== Mitch James ===
- "Sunday Morning" – Single (2019)
