= We Could Be the One =

Single by Dannii Minogue
- Released: 2 June 2023
- Genre: Electro-pop
- Length: 3:24
- Label: ITV Studios
- Songwriters: Ian Masterson; Hayley Sanderson
- Producers: Ian Masterson; Adrian Newman

Dannii Minogue singles chronology
| "All I Wanna Do 2020" (2020) | "We Could Be the One" (2023) | "Thinking 'Bout Us" (2024) |

"We Could Be the One" is a song by Australian singer Dannii Minogue, released as a single on 2 June 2023. It was written by Ian Masterson and Hayley Sanderson, and produced by Masterson and Minogue's boyfriend, Adrian Newman. "We Could Be the One" is Minogue's first original song since 2017's "Galaxy" and serves as the theme song of the British BBC LGBT dating shows I Kissed a Boy and I Kissed a Girl. All profits from the single will be donated to the British helpline Switchboard LGBT+.

== Reception ==
Official Charts described the track as an "anthemic banger", and Retropop Magazine called it "euphoric". Essentially Pop noted it as an "80's inspired electro-pop track", while PinkNews felt it was "one more glittering entry" to Minogue's "extensive catalogue of bangers".

== Chart performance ==
"We Could Be the One" debuted at number five on the UK Singles Downloads Chart on 9 June 2023.

== Charts ==
Chart performance for "We Could Be the One"
| Chart (2023) | Peak position |
|---|---|
| UK Singles Downloads (OCC) | 5 |
