= Wings (Delta Goodrem song) =

Single by Delta Goodrem

from the album Wings of the Wild
- Released: 24 July 2015
- Genre: Pop
- Length: 3:27
- Label: Sony
- Songwriters: Delta Goodrem; Anthony Egizii; David Musumeci
- Producer: DNA

Delta Goodrem singles chronology
"Only Human" (2015)	"Wings" (2015)	"Dear Life" (2016)

Music video
- "Wings" on YouTube

"Wings" is a song by Australian singer-songwriter Delta Goodrem, released as the lead single from her fifth studio album Wings of the Wild. It was written by Goodrem with Anthony Egizii and David Musumeci, the song's producers known as DNA Songs. Sony Music released it as a digital download and CD single on 24 July 2015. "Wings" is a pop song, with heavy drums, keyboards, piano, guitar riff and strings as its mains instrumentation. Lyrically, "Wings" has a focus on self-empowerment, where Goodrem uses "the extended metaphor of flight to explore feelings of catharsis and one’s ability to overcome adversity".

Inspired by listening to Calvin Harris and Haim, Ella Henderson, and London Grammar after a creative block, the song received positive reviews from music critics, who commended its empowering atmosphere, the pre-chorus and the song's production. "Wings" debuted at number eight on the Australian ARIA Singles Chart, peaking at number one in its third week on the chart, becoming her ninth number-one in the country and her first in eight years. Its music video premiered on 6 August 2015, and it features the singer with spinning pianos, dove flying, ballet jumping and heavy duty wind machines.

== Background and release ==
On 17 June 2013, Goodrem released the song "Heart Hypnotic", a collaboration with American record producer and OneRepublic lead singer Ryan Tedder, as the lead single of her upcoming fifth studio album. It became another top-ten hit for the singer, however it was later dismissed as the album's first single with no explanations. Later, Goodrem released in September 2014 a version of Martika's single "Love.. Thy Will Be Done" to promote her tour in Australia. In 2015, she released another single, "Only Human", as part of Neighbours' 30th anniversary celebrations, and it managed to reach ARIA's top-fifty. Goodrem then went into the studio with DNA Songs and wrote "Wings", after opening for Ricky Martin's Australian tour. Finally, the singer announced the song to be the proper lead single from her forthcoming fifth studio album due to be released via Sony Music Australia, which distributed the song as digital download and in CD single format on 24 July 2015, exclusively in Australia.

== Composition ==
"I've always wanted to work with the guys and see what magic they bring combined with what I do. It was great, we were working and I knew what the song sounded like in my head, and they were so incredible in bringing it out of me."

— Goodrem about working with DNA Songs.

"Wings" was written by Goodrem with its producers Anthony Egizii and David Musumeci, also known as the production duo DNA Songs. It is a pop song, with heavy drums and keyboards, as well as live piano and strings as its main instrumentation. It also features a "heart-racing" guitar riff, which according to Bradley Stern of MuuMuse, is reminiscent of "Edge of Seventeen". It was inspired by Goodrem listening to Calvin Harris and Haim's "Pray to God", Ella Henderson and London Grammar, and was recorded in May 2015. She explained, "It's good to be inspired, to evolve and keep moving forward. It was like going into a laboratory with DNA to experiment and find my DNA again. After touring with Ricky [Martin] I felt like I know what makes me again. 'Wings' feels fresh. It feels like it's my first single off the ranks as an adult. It just feels different."

Lyrically, "Wings" deals with themes of self-empowerment, described by Kathy McCabe of PerthNow as a "personal statement about letting go of her tightly-wound self control", while "using the extended metaphor of flight to explore feelings of catharsis and one's ability to overcome adversity," as noted by Renowned for Sound's Joseph Earp. In the chorus, she sings: "What if I lose my self-control? What if I choose to let it go? I wanna let you and me collide / Baby, these wings were made, these wings were made to fly." While commenting about the song, Goodrem explained: "I wanted to make sure I had a song that incorporated all the things that make me feel like a powerful woman... you always want a song to represent where you are now. I feel like the most important thing is, 'Wings' just feels fresh. The meaning of the song is about looking for new horizons, everybody is looking for a second chance." She further said:

"I wanted 'Wings' to convey that liberated feeling: with a bit of wildness meets a bit of letting go... That's been a big theme, where I've kind of let a lot go. These 'wings' are made to fly!."[...] I'm letting my hair down. I've come to a place where I have to own who I am and be proud of that. That chapter, turning 30, it's best thing I've ever gone through. That time by myself was about finding my voice again, finding my music and what is it that I love. [...] I feel like I'm the same as I was when I was 15 and hadn't had any records released."

== Critical reception ==
The song received positive reviews from music critics. Music store Sanity described it as "a beautifully conceived song that harnesses Delta's natural instrumental ability with her soaring powerful vocals to create a positively charged pop single." Renowned for Sound's Joseph Earp gave the song four stars out of five and praised the song for being a "timely reminder of the singer's many skills; it's operatic, it's baroque, and it's empowering." Earp then went on to describe the song as a "genuine slice of pop magic [...] a song that starts at the emotional pay off that most musicians would choose to end with, and it only gets bigger and brasher from there." Bradley Stern of MuuMuse also wrote a positive review, praising "the hectic, heart-racing pre-chorus, which is all sorts of a thrilling rush" as well as its "huge chorus, with massive soaring melodies packed into each word." Herald Sun's Luke Dennehy called it a "return to form" for the singer, claiming that her last big hit was "Wish You Were Here" (2012), while a writer of website Auspop claimed that "Wings" is "the most uptempo we've ever heard Ms Goodrem and [...] it's a cracking good pop song."

== Commercial performance ==
"Wings" debuted on the Australian ARIA Singles Chart at number eight on the week ending 9 August 2015, becoming the week's highest debut and Goodrem's first top 10 debut since "Heart Hypnotic", which peaked at number seven in June 2013. In its second week, the song descended to number twenty-six, but after a performance on The Voice Australia, on which she is also a judge, the song managed to climb to number-one on the week ending 23 August 2015, becoming her ninth number-one single in Australia and her first in eight years – the last being "In This Life" (2007). While scoring her ninth number-one single, Goodrem is tied with Rihanna, and one behind Kylie Minogue (10 number ones) and two behind Madonna (11 number ones) for the most number-one singles by a female in the history of the ARIA Charts. In its fourth week, "Wings" remained at the top, becoming her longest run at the top since October 2004's "Out of the Blue" spent three weeks atop the charts (her single with the longest run at number-one), whilst the song is also tied with "Lost Without You" (2003) and "Innocent Eyes" (2003) which also remained at the top of the ARIA Charts for two weeks. Wings was certified Gold status in Australia in its third week of release with sales of over 35,000 from digital downloads and physical CD singles, later reaching Platinum status with sales accumulating over 70,000 in its ninth week of release.

== Music video ==
The song's accompanying music video was directed by Anthony Rose. The video premiered on 6 August 2015 on The Voice Australia Facebook page, while being released on YouTube a day later. The video was nominated for Best Video at the ARIA Music Awards of 2015. As of 23 March 2020, the video has over 6 million views on YouTube.

== Promotion ==
To promote "Wings", Goodrem performed on The Voice Australia on 9 August 2015. A day later, she went on the Today Show to perform the track while playing the piano. She also performed the song at various in stores in various cities across Australia, including the Westfield Kotara shopping centre in Newcastle, as well as several major commercial radio stations in Australia.

== Track listing ==
- Digital download
1. "Wings" – 3:27
- CD single
1. "Wings" – 3:27
2. "Wings" (Alastor's Gun Metal Angel Extended Club Mix) – 7:01
3. "Wings" (Alastor's Gun Metal Angel Club Radio Mix) – 3:46

== Charts ==
=== Weekly charts ===
Chart (2015)	Peak position
Australia (ARIA)	1
New Zealand (Recorded Music NZ)	39

=== Year-end charts ===
Chart (2015)	Position
Australia (ARIA)	88

== Certifications ==
Region	Certification	Certified units/sales
Australia (ARIA)	2× Platinum	140,000^{‡}
^{‡} Sales+streaming figures based on certification alone.

== Release history ==
Country	Date	Format	Label
Australia	24 July 2015	CD single; Digital download	Sony Music Australia
New Zealand	24 July 2015	CD single; Digital download	Sony Music Australia
Indonesia	2 October 2015	Digital download	Sony Music Indonesia
United Kingdom	30 October 2015	Digital download	Epic Records

== See also ==
- List of number-one singles of 2015 (Australia)
