= Wings of the Wild =

Studio album by Delta Goodrem
- Released: 1 July 2016
- Recorded: 2013–2016
- Genre: Pop
- Length: 49:15
- Label: Sony Music
- Producers: Dave Bassett; DNA; Delta Goodrem; David Hodges; Jon Hume; Martin Johnson; Nathaniel Motte; Pete Nappi; Vince Pizzinga; Johnny Powers

Delta Goodrem chronology
Innocent Eyes: Ten Year Anniversary Acoustic Edition (2013)	Wings of the Wild (2016)	I Honestly Love You (2018)

Singles from Wings of the Wild
- 1. "Wings" Released: 24 July 2015; 2. "Dear Life" Released: 6 May 2016; 3. "Enough" Released: 24 June 2016; 4. "The River" Released: 6 October 2016

Wings of the Wild is the fifth studio album by Australian singer-songwriter Delta Goodrem. It was released on 1 July 2016, through Sony Music Australia. A follow-up to her last studio album, Child of the Universe (2012), it was her first studio album in four years.

The album was preceded by the release of its lead single, "Wings", which entered at number eight on the ARIA Singles Chart, ultimately topping the chart for two consecutive weeks. The album's second single, "Dear Life", was released on 6 May 2016, where it debuted and peaked at number three on the ARIA Singles Chart.

== Background and development ==
In June 2013, eight months after the release of Child of the Universe, Goodrem released "Heart Hypnotic" as a stand-alone single, which peaked at number seven in the ARIA Singles Chart in Australia, while appearing as a judge on The Voice Australia. This was followed by a cover of Martika's "Love... Thy Will Be Done in support of her tour with Italian singer Andrea Bocelli.

She then released "Only Human" in March 2015 to tie in with her appearance in soap opera Neighbours as her former character Nina Tucker, to celebrate the show's 30th anniversary. The album's first official single "Wings" was released in Australia in July 2015 and reached number one. Later in 2015, Goodrem was announced to star in the Australian production of the musical Cats in the role of Grizabella.

In a 2015 interview with Official Charts Company, Goodrem confirmed that she was working on her fifth studio album, stating "I've written a lot of songs for it already, but I'm going to finish it while I'm doing Cats, because I'll be stationed in the same place for three months, which for me is unheard of. I'll be tweaking every piano riff and guitar line and make sure it's the best record I've ever done. That's the ambition."

On 23 June 2016, Goodrem announced the album's title and release date. She described the album's themes as wildness, rawness and freedom.

The lack of romantic relationships as a theme for the album was described by Goodrem as "exactly what [she] wanted", explaining "I've been clear moving forward about what I want to share as a musician and in public. It was never me to share that side of me and that's a lesson I've learned along the way. In future, it will be private, I will be able to find the better balance. This chapter wasn't about (love), it was about me. If someone had walked into my life during that time, it still would have been about me, me having my time to be free, to be myself." For this reason, Goodrem had originally planned not to include her 2015 single "Only Human" on the album's track list, describing the song as sounding "broken", but later decided to "put it in the middle, it's the heart of the album and now it can connect with someone else going through that."

== Singles ==
"Wings" was released as the album's lead single on 24 July 2015. The song debuted on the Australian ARIA Singles Chart at number eight in the week ending 9 August 2015; the following week, the track reached number one on the chart, keeping its position for two consecutive weeks. Not long afterwards, it became a Number One single in Latvia. The album's second single, "Dear Life" was released on 6 May 2016. The song debuted and peaked at number three, and became a surprise Number One in Ukraine. "Enough" was released as the album's third single on 24 June 2016, alongside the pre-order of the album. The song peaked at number 27. "The River" was released as the fourth single from the album; its music video premiered via-Facebook on 23 September 2016. The song, "Only Human", was released as a stand-alone single on 13 March 2015, but was later included on the final track listing. The single peaked at number 46.

== Critical reception ==
Professional ratings
Review scores
Source	Rating
Renowned for Sound	4/5 stars
Herald Sun	4/5 stars
auspOp	4/5 stars
The Sydney Morning Herald	2.5/5 stars

The album received generally positive reviews from critics. Jessica Mule from Renowned For Sound said "You'd have to be deaf not to pick up on the less than subtle, 'you can't pull me down anymore', brazen, self-empowered motif of Deltas newest album" adding "We come to find through the albums deliberate lack of tracks about romantic love, that Delta is at her strongest in songs that resemble a need to uplift and encourage, motivate .. that it helps set her apart from the major players in the industry." adding "Wings of the Wild might just be Delta's strongest album since Innocent Eyes".

Cameron Adams from the Herald Sun said "Wings of the Wild is her most confident and empowered release." Adams complimented the "risks and experiments no one saw coming".

David from auspOp said Goodrem has "created a great album of pop music. From start to finish, the album is a classic and timeless collection of tracks." adding "this is an album from a truly stunning Australian artist and is Delta's most consistent to date."

Bernard Zuel from The Sydney Morning Herald was less favourable. He questioned "who is Delta Goodrem?", particularly criticising the lyrics in "Dear Life", the "meaningless strut" of "The River", the "bombast" of "I'm Not Giving Up" and the "bizarrely misunderstood cover" of "I Believe in a Thing Called Love".

== Track listing ==
Wings of the Wild track listing
No.	Title	Writer(s)	Producer(s)	Length
1.	"Feline"	Delta Goodrem; Nathaniel Motte; Vince Pizzinga; Sean Foreman	Goodrem; Pizzinga; Motte	4:15
2.	"Wings"	Goodrem; Anthony Egizii; David Musumeci	DNA	3:25
3.	"Dear Life"	Goodrem; Egizii; Musumeci	Goodrem; DNA	3:09
4.	"Just Call"	Goodrem; Jon Hume; Egizii	Goodrem; Hume	4:01
5.	"In the Name of Love"	Goodrem; Egizii; Musumeci	Goodrem; DNA	3:12
6.	"Enough" (featuring Gizzle)	Goodrem; Glenda "Gizzle" Proby; Johnny Powers; Pizzinga; Ameerah Roelants; Zac Poor	Powers	4:28
7.	"Heavy"	Goodrem; Martin Johnson	Johnson	4:19
8.	"Only Human"	Goodrem; Pizzinga; Pete Nappi	Goodrem; Nappi; Pizzinga	3:27
9.	"The River"	Goodrem; David Hodges; Steven Solomon	Hodges	3:04
10.	"I'm Not Giving Up"	Goodrem; Dave Bassett; Solomon	Bassett	4:36
11.	"Encore"	Goodrem; Johnson; Sam Hollander	Johnson	4:04
12.	"Hold On"	Goodrem; Egizii; Musumeci; Pizzinga	Goodrem; DNA	3:40
13.	"I Believe in a Thing Called Love"	Justin Hawkins; Dan Hawkins; Ed Graham; Frankie Poullain	Goodrem; Pizzinga	3:35
Total length:				49:15

Australian tour edition DVD
No.	Title	Length
1.	"Born to Try" (music video)
2.	"Lost Without You" (music video)
3.	"Innocent Eyes" (music video)
4.	"Not Me, Not I" (music video)
5.	"Predictable" (music video)
6.	"Out of the Blue" (music video)
7.	"Almost Here" (music video)
8.	"Mistaken Identity" (music video)
9.	"Be Strong" (music video)
10.	"A Little Too Late" (music video)
11.	"In This Life" (music video)
12.	"Believe Again" (music video)
13.	"You Will Only Break My Heart" (music video)
14.	"I Can't Break It to My Heart" (music video)
15.	"Sitting on Top of the World" (music video)
16.	"Wish You Were Here" (music video)
17.	"Dancing with a Broken Heart" (music video)
18.	"Wings" (music video)
19.	"Dear Life" (music video)
20.	"Enough" (music video)
21.	"The River" (music video)

== Charts ==
=== Weekly charts ===
Chart (2016)	Peak position
Australian Albums (ARIA)	1
Dutch Albums (Album Top 100)	182
New Zealand Albums (RMNZ)	8
Scottish Albums (Official Charts)	97
UK Albums (Official Charts)	129
UK Album Downloads (OCC)	28
UK Album Sales (OCC)	94

=== Year-end charts ===
Chart (2016)	Position
Australian Albums (ARIA)	26

== Certifications ==
Region	Certification	Certified units/sales
Australia (ARIA)	Gold	35,000^{^}
^{^} Shipments figures based on certification alone.

== Release history ==
List of release dates, showing formats, label and reference
Date	Format(s)	Label	Edition	Catalogue	Ref.
1 July 2016	CD; digital download	Sony Music Australia	Standard	88985352572	
28 October 2016	CD + DVD	Sony Music Australia	Tour Edition	88985386952	
26 January 2024	2×LP	Sony Music Australia	White & Black Vinyl	MOVLP3285	

== Wings of the Wild Tour ==
Wings of the Wild Tour
- Tour by Delta Goodrem
- Associated album: Wings of the Wild
- Start date: 27 October 2016
- End date: 11 November 2016
- Legs: 1
- No. of shows: 7

Delta Goodrem concert chronology
- An Evening with Delta: The Top of My World Shows (2012); Wings Of The Wild Tour (2016); Bridge over Troubled Dreams Tour (2022)

In support of Wings of the Wild, Goodrem embarked on her fourth concert tour of Australia. The Wings of the Wild Tour commenced in Newcastle on 27 October 2016 and concluded in Brisbane on 11 November 2016, and became the highest-selling tour for an Australian artist in 2016.

A live recording of the tour was released on DVD and Blu-ray on 2 November 2018.

=== Setlist ===
1. "Feline" (contains excerpts of "Child of the Universe")
2. "Innocent Eyes"
3. "In This Life"
4. "Sitting on Top of the World"
5. "Dear Life"
6. "Touch"
7. "Not Me, Not I"
8. "Mistaken Identity" (contains excerpts of "Cornflake Girl")
9. "Heavy"
10. "Brave Face"
11. "Wish You Were Here"
12. "Lost Without You"
13. "Memory"
14. "In the Name of Love" / "Love Thy Will Be Done"
15. "Will You Fall For Me" / "Don't Let Go (Love)"
16. "Almost Here"
17. "Encore" (at select dates)
18. "Just Call"
19. "The River"
20. "Out of the Blue" / "Hey Jude"
21. "I Believe in a Thing Called Love"
22. "Enough" / "I'm Not Giving Up" (excerpt)
23. "Heart Hypnotic" / "Never Forget You"
24. "Predictable"
25. "Believe Again"
26. "Born to Try"
27. "Wings"

=== Tour dates ===
Date	City	Country	Venue
27 October 2016	Newcastle	Australia	Newcastle Entertainment Centre
28 October 2016	Sydney	Australia	Qudos Bank Arena
29 October 2016	Canberra	Australia	AIS Arena
3 November 2016	Melbourne	Australia	Margaret Court Arena
5 November 2016	Adelaide	Australia	Adelaide Entertainment Centre
8 November 2016	Perth	Australia	Perth Arena
11 November 2016	Brisbane	Australia	Brisbane Convention Centre

== See also ==
- List of number-one albums of 2016 (Australia)
