= Always Be Yours =

Single by Nathaniel Willemse

from the album Yours
- B-side: "Live Louder (acoustic)"
- Released: 9 October 2015
- Recorded: 2015
- Genre: Pop
- Length: 4:12
- Label: DNA Songs / Sony
- Songwriters: Nathaniel Willemse; Anthony Egizii; David Musumeci
- Producer: DNA Songs

Nathaniel Willemse singles chronology
| "Flava" (2015) | "Always Be Yours" (2015) |

"Always Be Yours" is a song recorded by Australian singer-songwriter Nathaniel Willemse and fifth single from his debut studio album Yours. It was released on 9 October 2015. The song was also an instant grat track upon pre-order of the album and the CD single was released on 30 October 2015.

== Background and promotion ==
In January 2015, Willemse married his long-time girlfriend, model Fujan Erfanian on a tropical island in Langkawi, Malaysia. During an interview on The X Factor Australia, Nathaniel said he wrote and performed "Always Be Yours" for their wedding day.

Willies announced the release of the single via his Twitter account on 8 October.

Willemse performed "Always Be Yours" live on The X Factor Australia results show on 27 October 2015 and again at the 2015 Melbourne Cup which was televised on Sunrise.

== Music video ==
The official video clip was released on 6 November 2015 via Willemse's VEVO account. It was directed by Nik Kacevski.

== Review ==
In a review of the album Yours, Cameron Adams from the Herald Sun said "The deep ballad "Always Be Yours" is just waiting to soundtrack a love scene on Home and Away". Jackie Smith of CargoArt named the song one of her favourites on the album.

== Track listing ==
- Digital download
1. "Always Be Yours" – 4:12
- CD single
1. "Always Be Yours" – 4:12
2. "Live Louder" (live acoustic version) –

== Weekly charts ==
| Chart (2015) | Peak position |
|---|---|
| Australia (ARIA) | 79 |
| Australian Artist (ARIA) | 9 |

== Release history ==
| Country | Date | Format | Catalogue | Label |
|---|---|---|---|---|
| Australia | 9 October 2015 | Digital download | - | Sony Music Australia |
| Australia | 30 October 2015 | CD single | 88875163882 | Sony Music Australia |
