= I Kissed a Girl (TV series) =

British reality dating show

- Genre: Reality
- Presented by: Dannii Minogue
- Narrated by: Charley Marlowe
- Theme music composer: Ian Masterson; Hayley Sanderson
- Opening theme: "We Could Be the One" by Dannii Minogue
- Ending theme: "We Could Be the One" by Dannii Minogue
- Country of origin: United Kingdom
- Original language: English
- No. of series: 2
- No. of episodes: 10

Production
- Executive producers: David Brindley; Dan Gray; Louise Hutchinson
- Producers: Olivia Brooke; Cara Bruce; Drew Cane; Andrea Grespan; Samuel King; Abigail McCutcheon; Georgia Miles; Mandni Popat; Charlotte Welsh
- Production location: Italy
- Editor: Ali Haddon-Cave
- Running time: 44–48 minutes
- Production company: Twofour

Original release
- Network: BBC Three
- Release: 5 May 2024 – present

Related
- I Kissed a Boy

I Kissed a Girl is a British dating game show on BBC Three and BBC iPlayer, which began on 5 May 2024 and is the first British dating show to feature exclusively lesbian and bisexual women. A spin-off of I Kissed a Boy, it is hosted by Dannii Minogue and narrated by Charley Marlowe. Following a successful first series, it was announced that I Kissed a Girl would air for a second and final series, before being cancelled by the BBC.

== Production ==
I Kissed a Girl was announced on 4 June 2023, prior to the airing of the final episode of I Kissed a Boy. Dannii Minogue was confirmed as the host, with Charley Marlowe narrating. Following what was considered to be a successful first series that aired in 2024, it was confirmed that the BBC had renewed I Kissed a Girl for a second and final series. They cited budget cuts as a reason for the cancellation. The second series aired from June 2026.

== Format ==
The series follows ten single sapphic women who are matched up and meet for the first time "...with a kiss. No small talk. No swiping on the apps. Just one kiss that could be the start of many". Like I Kissed a Boy, the show is set in an Italian country house called the "Masseria". Prior to the show the contestants are matched, based on what they're looking for in a partner. After meeting their match for the first time with a kiss, the women are encouraged to get to know their new partners and try out their relationship.

== Series 1 (2024) ==
=== Contestants ===
The first contestants were announced on 23 April 2024.

Series 1 I Kissed a Girl contestants
Contestant	Age	Hometown	Entered	Exited	Status
Cara Kinney	25	Ballycastle	Episode 1	Episode 9	Committed with Georgia
Georgia Robert	28	Hunmanby	Episode 1	Episode 9	Committed with Cara
Naee Stoute	25	London	Episode 1	Episode 9	Committed with Priya
Priya Sohanpal	23	Newport	Episode 1	Episode 9	Committed with Naee
Meg Homer	24	Goole	Episode 1	Episode 9	Not committed
Eva Adamson	22	Belfast	Episode 2	Episode 9	Not committed
Amy Spalding	24	Surrey	Episode 1	Episode 9	Not committed
Hannah Simpson	23	Glasgow	Episode 5	Episode 9	Not committed
Fiorenza Cocozza	22	Glasgow	Episode 1	Episode 8	Eliminated
Beth Cave	25	Bath	Episode 4	Episode 8	Eliminated
Lailah Muscat	25	Cardiff	Episode 4	Episode 8	Eliminated
Thea Hallow	23	London	Episode 5	Episode 8	Eliminated
Abbie Cole	24	Brighton	Episode 1	Episode 5	Eliminated
Lisha Paige	22	Caernarfon	Episode 1	Episode 5	Eliminated
Em Hobern	25	Surrey	Episode 4	Episode 5	Eliminated
Demi Echezona	23	Hemel Hempstead	Episode 1	Episode 3	Eliminated

=== Kiss Off Progress ===
Kiss Off progress chart
	Episode 1	Episode 2	Episode 5		Episode 7/8	Episode 9
Cara	Georgia	Georgia	Georgia	—N/a	Georgia	Georgia
Georgia	Cara	Cara	Cara	—N/a	Cara	Cara
Naee	Priya	Priya	Priya	Abbie & Lisha to Eliminate	Priya	Priya
Priya	Naee	Naee	Naee	Abbie & Lisha to Eliminate	Naee	Naee
Meg	Amy	Fiorenza	Eva	—N/a	Eva	Not Kissed (Episode 9)
Eva	Not in Masseria	Amy	Meg	—N/a	Meg	Not Kissed (Episode 9)
Amy	Meg	Eva	Lailah	—N/a	Hannah	Not Kissed (Episode 9)
Hannah	Not in Masseria				Amy	Not Kissed (Episode 9)
Fiorenza	Demi	Meg	Beth	—N/a	Not Kissed (Episode 8)	
Beth	Not in Masseria		Fiorenza	—N/a	Not Kissed (Episode 8)	
Lailah	Not in Masseria		Amy	—N/a	Not Kissed (Episode 8)	
Thea	Not in Masseria				Not Kissed (Episode 8)	
Abbie	Lisha	Lisha	Lisha	Eliminated (Episode 5)		
Lisha	Abbie	Abbie	Abbie	Eliminated (Episode 5)		
Em	Not in Masseria		Not Kissed (Episode 5)			
Demi	Fiorenza	Not Kissed (Episode 2)				

== Series 2 (2026) ==
=== Contestants ===
The first contestants were announced on 23 June 2026.

Series 2 I Kissed a Girl contestants
Contestant	Age	Hometown	Entered	Exited	Status
Elise Revett	24	Essex	Episode 1	Episode 9	Committed with Elisha
Elisha Davies	22	Carmarthenshire	Episode 1	Episode 9	Committed with Elise
Nikita Bharath	24	Leeds	Episode 1	Episode 9	Committed with Pippa
Pippa Palmer	TBA	St Albans	Episode 4	Episode 9	Committed with Nikita
Lindsey Amelie	25	Buckinghamshire	Episode 1	Episode 9	Not committed
Blessing Kingsley	23	Carlow	Episode 2	Episode 9	Not committed
Almayra Shah	22	Eastbourne	Episode 2	Episode 9	Not committed
Kayleigh McCarthy	21	Coventry	Episode 2	Episode 9	Not committed
Ashlea Mitchell	25	Bedford	Episode 1	Episode 8	Eliminated
Ebony Bell	22	Newcastle	Episode 1	Episode 8	Eliminated
Imogen Milnes	21	Manchester	Episode 1	Episode 8	Eliminated
Josie Brown	23	Liverpool	Episode 6	Episode 8	Eliminated
Sophie Cooke	27	Manchester	Episode 6	Episode 8	Eliminated
Renee Thomas	25	North London	Episode 1	Episode 7	Eliminated
Tyra More	24	Moray	Episode 1	Episode 5	Eliminated
Faye McGrath	24	Warrington	Episode 1	Episode 4	Eliminated

=== Kiss Off Progress ===
Kiss Off Progress chart
	Episode 1	Episode 3	Episode 5	Episode 7/8	Episode 9
Elise	Faye	Elisha	Elisha	Elisha	Elisha
Elisha	Nikita	Elise	Elise	Elise	Elise
Nikita	Elisha	Almayra	Pippa	Pippa	Pippa
Pippa	Not in Masseria		Nikita	Nikita	Nikita
Lindsey	Renee	Blessing	Blessing	Blessing	Not Kissed (Episode 9)
Blessing	Not in Masseria	Lindsey	Lindsey	Lindsey	Not Kissed (Episode 9)
Almayra	Not in Masseria	Nikita	Kayleigh	Kayleigh	Not Kissed (Episode 9)
Kayleigh	Not in Masseria	Tyra	Almayra	Almayra	Not Kissed (Episode 9)
Ashlea	Imogen	Renee	Renee	Not Kissed (Episode 8)	
Ebony	Tyra	Imogen	Imogen	Not Kissed (Episode 8)	
Imogen	Ashlea	Ebony	Ebony	Not Kissed (Episode 8)	
Josie	Not in Masseria			Not Kissed (Episode 8)	
Sophie	Not in Masseria			Not Kissed (Episode 8)	
Renee	Lindsey	Ashlea	Ashlea	Eliminated (Episode 7)	
Tyra	Ebony	Kayleigh	Not Kissed (Episode 5)		
Faye	Elise	Not Kissed (Episode 3)			
