= I Kissed a Boy =

"I Kissed a Boy" may refer to:

- One of several cover versions of the 2008 Katy Perry song "I Kissed a Girl"
- I Kissed a Boy (TV series), a British gay dating show first aired in 2023
