= You're Beautiful (Nathaniel Willemse song) =

Single by Nathaniel Willemse

from the album Yours
- Released: 28 February 2014
- Recorded: 2013
- Genre: Pop; R&B
- Length: 2:59
- Label: DNA Songs / Sony
- Songwriters: Nathaniel Willemse; Anthony Egizii; David Musumeci
- Producer: DNA Songs

Nathaniel Willemse singles chronology
"I Am Australian" (2014)	"You're Beautiful" (2014)	"Live Louder" (2014)

"You're Beautiful" is a song recorded by Australian singer-songwriter Nathaniel Willemse. It was released on 28 February 2014 as the second single from his debut studio album Yours.

Two remixes of the song were released on 13 June 2014.

== Background ==
In February 2014, Willemse announced his new single would be titled "You're Beautiful" and would be the follow-up to the double platinum-selling single "You". Speaking to Auspop in March, Willemse said, "We wanted to make sure that it was in the same realm as 'You', but have points of difference. We looked at Lorde and almost all of Lorde's songs are identical or close to being the same type of sound. So we didn't want to sway too much". He continued, "I've had feedback from friends and other people who've said it sounds exactly the same as 'You'. It doesn't sound exactly the same. It's in that same area stylistically in sound and vision terms. We wanted to follow through with that falsetto vibe, but we wanted to make it a bit edgier, a bit ballsier and with a bit more lyrical depth." "You're Beautiful" debuted at number 14 on the ARIA Singles Chart on 10 March 2014.

== Music video ==
The official video clip was released on 28 February 2014 via Willemse's VEVO account.

== Track listing ==
- Digital download
1. "You're Beautiful" – 2:59
- Digital download
1. "You're Beautiful" (Matt Watkins Remix) – 5:34
- Digital download
1. "You're Beautiful" (A-Tonez Remix)– 3:42

== Charts ==
=== Weekly charts ===
Chart (2014)	Peak position
Australia (ARIA)	14
Australia Urban (ARIA)	2

=== Year-end chart ===
Chart (2014)	Rank
Australian Artist Singles Chart	48
