= On Top (Johnny Ruffo song) =

Single by Johnny Ruffo
- Released: 15 June 2012
- Genre: Dance-pop
- Length: 3:39
- Label: Sony Music Australia
- Songwriters: Johnny Ruffo; Michael Tan; Anthony Egizii; David Musumeci
- Producer: DNA Songs

Johnny Ruffo singles chronology
"On Top" (2012)	"Take It Home" (2012)

Music video
- "On Top" on YouTube

"On Top" is the debut single by Australian singer Johnny Ruffo. It was written by Ruffo, Michael Tan, Anthony Egizii and David Musumeci. "On Top" was released digitally on 15 June 2012. The song debuted at number twenty-eight on the ARIA Singles Chart and eventually peaked at number fourteen. It was certified Platinum by the Australian Recording Industry Association (ARIA), denoting shipments of 70,000 copies. The music video was filmed in Sydney and features the iconic city sky line and Australian celebrity chef, model, restaurateur, and cookbook author Sarah Todd.

== Personnel ==
- Songwriting – Johnny Ruffo, Michael Tan, Anthony Egizii, David Musumeci
- Production – DNA Songs
- Mixing – Miles Walker
- Additional programming – Michael Tan
- Programming and keys – Anthony Egizii
- Mastering – Leon Zervos

== Charts ==
Chart performance for "On Top"
Chart (2012)	Peak position
Australia (ARIA)	14

== Certifications ==
Certifications for "On Top"
Region	Certification	Certified units/sales
Australia (ARIA)	Platinum	70,000^{^}
^{^} Shipments figures based on certification alone.
