= Give You Love =

2023 single by Jessica Mauboy ft. Jason Derulo

Single by Jessica Mauboy featuring Jason Derulo

from the album Yours Forever
- Released: 11 August 2023
- Recorded: 2023
- Length: 2:53
- Label: Warner
- Songwriters: Shannon Busch; Stephen Mowat; Blessing Offor
- Producers: Stephen Charles; Styalz Fuego; Rudy Sandapa

Jessica Mauboy singles chronology
| "Right Here, Right Now" (2023) | "Give You Love" (2023) | "Flashback" (2023) |

Jason Derulo singles chronology
| "Slow Low" (2023) | "Give You Love" (2023) | "Lemons" (2023) |

Music video
- "Give You Love" on YouTube

"Give You Love" is a song by Australian recording artist Jessica Mauboy featuring American singer, Jason Derulo. It was released on August 11, 2023, as the lead single from Mauboy's fifth studio album Yours Forever (2024).

At the 2023 ARIA Music Awards, the song's video was nominated for Best Video. At the APRA Music Awards of 2024, the song was shortlisted for Song of the Year. At the 2024 ARIA Music Awards, the song was nominated for Song of the Year. The song took first place in the 2024 Vanda & Young Global Songwriting Competition.

== Background and release ==
"Give You Love" is a vocal collaboration with fellow The Voice Australia coach Jason Derulo. About the collaboration, Mauboy said "Jason is such an incredible singer and he's got such a deep soul and spirit. He grew up singing in church and was classically trained, so I had no doubt he would sound amazing on this special song. It's an honour to collaborate with Jason, we love each other's work and respect each other as artists." Derulo said "It was a pleasure working side-by-side with Jess as a coach on The Voice and I feel incredibly blessed that Jess thought of me for this song. I had such a blast putting my spin on it and laying down the vocals when I was in Sydney. I hope everyone can feel the warmth and spirit in 'Give You Love'."

== Reception ==
In a review of the song, Women in Pop said "It is a brilliant, uplifting pop anthem that overflows with soul and touches of gospel and leaves you with an overwhelming sense of joy."

== Charts ==
Chart performance for "Give You Love"
| Chart (2023) | Peak position |
|---|---|
| Australia (ARIA) | 74 |
| New Zealand Hot Singles (RMNZ) | 17 |

== Certifications ==
Certifications for "Give You Love"
| Region | Certification | Certified units/sales |
|---|---|---|
| Australia (ARIA) | Gold | 35,000^{‡} |
^{‡} Sales+streaming figures based on certification alone.
