= The Secret Daughter Season Two: Songs from the Original 7 Series =

Soundtrack album by Jessica Mauboy
- Released: 6 October 2017
- Genre: Pop
- Label: Sony Music Australia

Jessica Mauboy chronology
The Secret Daughter: Songs from the Original TV Series (2016)	The Secret Daughter Season Two: Songs from the Original 7 Series (2017)	Hilda (2019)

Singles from The Secret Daughter Season Two: Songs from the Original 7 Series
- 1. "Fallin' " Released: 9 June 2017; 2. "Then I Met You" Released: 17 September 2017

The Secret Daughter Season Two: Songs from the Original 7 Series is the second individual soundtrack album by Australian recording artist Jessica Mauboy, featuring music used in the second season of the television series of the same name, which stars Mauboy. The album was released on 6 October 2017 through Sony Music Australia.

At the ARIA Music Awards of 2018, the album was nominated for Best Original Soundtrack, Cast or Show Album.

== Singles ==
The original track "Fallin'" was released as the album's lead single on 9 June 2017; it peaked at number 11 on the ARIA Singles Chart and was certified platinum for shipments of 70,000 units. Another original track "Then I Met You" was released on 17 September 2017 as the album's second single; it peaked at number 114 on the ARIA Singles Chart.

== Reception ==
Professional ratings
Review scores
Source	Rating
auspOp	3/5 stars
Herald Sun	3/5 stars

David from auspOp said "First and foremost, there are far too many covers here" calling the album "a mixed bag." He said "Nothing new has been done to most of the tracks – most versions are competent but not innovative or particularly memorable" but praised "Amazing Grace". David said of the two originals; "Fallin'" is "a stunningly beautiful song" and "Then I Met You" "is Jess at her mid-tempo belter best."

Cameron Adams from Herald Sun said "Mauboy shines up The Church's haunting 'Under the Milky Way', Paul Kelly's 'Dumb Things' is solid pub rock karaoke. Mauboy fought for Goanna's 'Solid Rock' and it shows. The real joy here is 'Amazing Grace', sung in native tongue, with Dr G Yunupingu [...] As new original 'Fallin' ' demonstrates that's enough covers albums now, time for new material."

== Track listing ==
No.	Title	Writer(s)	Length
1.	"Under the Milky Way" (The Church song)	Steve Kilbey; Karin Jansson	3:34
2.	"Then I Met You" (original)	Ivy Adara; Lindsey Jackson; Louis Schoorl	3:13
3.	"Fall at Your Feet" (Crowded House song)	Neil Finn	3:18
4.	"20 Good Reasons" (Thirsty Merc song)	Rai Thistlethwayte	3:30
5.	"Something Stupid" (featuring Isaiah) (Frank and Nancy Sinatra song)	C. Carson Parks	2:35
6.	"Rather Be" (Clean Bandit song)	Jack Patterson; James Napier; Nicole Marshall; Grace Chatto	3:40
7.	"Fallin' " (original)	Jessica Mauboy; Ivy Adara; Peter James Harding; Louis Schoorl	3:09
8.	"Dumb Things" (Paul Kelly and the Coloured Girls song)	Paul Kelly	2:30
9.	"High" (Lighthouse Family song)	Paul Tucker	4:18
10.	"Lover (You Don't Treat Me No Good)" (Sonia Dada song)	Dan Pritzker	3:59
11.	"Always on My Mind" (featuring Warren H. Williams) (Gwen McCrae song)	Wayne Carson; Johnny Christopher; Mark James	3:19
12.	"Listen to the Music" (The Doobie Brothers song)	Tom Johnston	3:27
13.	"Respect" (Aretha Franklin song)	Otis Redding	2:22
14.	"Break My Stride" (Matthew Wilder song)	Matthew Wilder; Greg Prestopino	3:00
15.	"Plans" (featuring J. R. Reyne) (Birds of Tokyo song)	Anthony Jackson; Ian Kenny; Adam Spark; Adam Weston	3:19
16.	"Light Surrounding You" (Evermore song)	Dann Hume; Jon Hume	3:32
17.	"Solid Rock" (Goanna song)	Shane Howard	3:29
18.	"Amazing Grace" (featuring Dr G Yunupingu)	John Newton	3:34

== Charts ==
=== Weekly charts ===
Chart (2017)	Peak position
Australian Albums (ARIA)	2

=== Year-end charts ===
Chart (2017)	Position
Australian Albums (ARIA)	20

== Certifications ==
Region	Certification	Certified units/sales
Australia (ARIA)	Gold	35,000^{^}
^{^} Shipments figures based on certification alone.

== Release history ==
Country	Date	Format	Label	Catalogue
Australia	6 October 2017	CD, digital download	Sony Music Australia	88985484442

== See also ==
- List of top 25 albums for 2017 in Australia
