= I Kissed a Boy (TV series) =

British reality dating show

- Genre: Reality
- Presented by: Dannii Minogue
- Narrated by: Layton Williams
- Theme music composer: Ian Masterson; Hayley Sanderson
- Opening theme: "We Could Be the One" by Dannii Minogue
- Ending theme: "We Could Be the One" by Dannii Minogue
- Country of origin: United Kingdom
- Original language: English
- No. of series: 2
- No. of episodes: 19

Production
- Executive producers: David Brindley; Dan Gray; Louise Hutchinson
- Producers: Johnathan Booth; Drew Cane; Joe Cummings; Chloe Geraghty; Andrea Grespan; Christ Hall; Samuel King; Sola Ogunsola
- Production location: Italy
- Editor: Ali Haddon-Cave
- Running time: 42–46 minutes
- Production company: Twofour

Original release
- Network: BBC
- Release: 13 May 2023 – 15 June 2025

Related
- I Kissed a Girl

I Kissed a Boy is a British dating game show on BBC Three and BBC iPlayer, which began on 13 May 2023. It is the first British dating show to feature exclusively gay men. It is hosted by Dannii Minogue and narrated by Layton Williams.

== Production ==
The first series of I Kissed a Boy aired throughout mid-2023. Following a successful first series, it was announced that it had been renewed for a second, which aired in mid-2025. In 2026, it was announced that the BBC had decided to cancel the series, citing budget reasons as the deciding factor.

== Format ==
The series follows ten single gay men who are matched up and meet for the first time "...with a kiss. No small talk. No messages. Just one kiss to test out their chemistry". The show is set in an Italian country house called the "Masseria". Prior to the show the contestants are matched, based on what they're looking for in a partner. After meeting their match for the first time with a kiss, the men are encouraged to get to know their new partners and try out their relationship.

== Series 1 (2023) ==
=== Contestants ===
The first contestants were announced on 26 April 2023.

Series 1 I Kissed a Boy contestants
Contestant	Age	Hometown	Entered	Exited	Status
Ollie King	27	Brighton	Episode 1	Episode 8	Committed with Dan
Dan Harry Glendinning	27	Glasgow	Episode 4	Episode 8	Committed with Ollie
Subomi Onanuga	29	London	Episode 1	Episode 8	Committed with Gareth
Gareth Graham	28	Kilkeel	Episode 1	Episode 8	Committed with Subomi
Jake Devline-Reed	27	Swansea	Episode 1	Episode 8	Committed with Kailum
Kailum Webster	25	Brighton	Episode 1	Episode 8	Committed with Jake
Ross Bester	27	Manchester	Episode 1	Episode 8	Committed with Ceejay
Ceejay Knight	26	London	Episode 4	Episode 8	Committed with Ross
Ben Clark	28	Edinburgh	Episode 1	Episode 8	Eliminated
Matty Holehouse	27	TBA	Episode 6	Episode 8	Eliminated
Vitor Moreira	27	London	Episode 4	Episode 7	Eliminated
Jake Watkins	26	TBA	Episode 6	Episode 7	Eliminated
Joseph Mendez	23	London	Episode 1	Episode 5	Eliminated
Mikey Connor	28	Liverpool	Episode 1	Episode 5	Eliminated
Josh Cemaloğlu	24	Rhyl	Episode 1	Episode 4	Walked
Robert "Bobski" Budzynski	23	Harlow	Episode 1	Episode 3	Eliminated

=== Kiss Off Progress ===
	Episode 1	Episode 2	Episode 5	Episode 6/7	Episode 8	
Ollie	Ben	Ben	Dan	Dan	Ben & Matty to Eliminate	Dan
Dan	Not in Masseria		Ollie	Ollie	Ben & Matty to Eliminate	Ollie
Subomi	Gareth	Gareth	Gareth	Gareth	Ben & Matty to Eliminate	Gareth
Gareth	Subomi	Subomi	Subomi	Subomi	Ben & Matty to Eliminate	Subomi
Jake	Kailum	Kailum	Kailum	Kailum	Ben & Matty to Eliminate	Kailum
Kailum	Jake	Jake	Jake	Jake	Ben & Matty to Eliminate	Jake
Ross	Joseph	Joseph	Ceejay	Ceejay	Ben & Matty to Eliminate	Ceejay
Ceejay	Not in Masseria		Ross	Ross	Ben & Matty to Eliminate	Ross
Ben	Ollie	Ollie	Vitor	Matty	Ross & Ceejay to Eliminate	Eliminated (Episode 8)
Matty	Not in Masseria			Ben	Ross & Ceejay to Eliminate	Eliminated (Episode 8)
Vitor	Not in Masseria		Ben	Not Kissed (Episode 7)		
Jake W	Not in Masseria			Not Kissed (Episode 7)		
Mikey	Not in Masseria	Josh	Not Kissed (Episode 5)			
Joseph	Ross	Ross	Not Kissed (Episode 5)			
Josh	Bobski	Mikey	Walked (Episode 4)			
Bobski	Josh	Not Kissed (Episode 2)				

=== Episodes ===
No. overall	No. in series	Title	Original release date	UK viewers (millions)
1	1	"Episode 1"	14 May 2023	N/A
2	2	"Episode 2"	15 May 2023	N/A
3	3	"Episode 3"	21 May 2023	N/A
4	4	"Episode 4"	22 May 2023	N/A
5	5	"Episode 5"	28 May 2023	N/A
6	6	"Episode 6"	29 May 2023	N/A
7	7	"Episode 7"	4 June 2023	N/A
8	8	"Episode 8"	5 June 2023	N/A
9	9	"The Reunion"	11 June 2023	N/A

== Series 2 (2025) ==
=== Contestants ===
The first contestants were announced on 30 April 2025.

Series 2 I Kissed a Boy contestants
Contestant	Age	Hometown	Entered	Exited	Status
Aron Awofadeju	27	Croydon	Episode 1	Episode 9	Committed with Jas
Jaskeran "Jas" Singh	27	Glasgow	Episode 1	Episode 9	Committed with Aron
Callum Akinade	27	St Leonards-on-Sea	Episode 1	Episode 9	Committed with Jordan B
Jordan Burrow	25	Lake District	Episode 1	Episode 9	Committed with Callum
Hugh Brien	25	Cork	Episode 4	Episode 9	Not committed
Jack Smith	22	Wigan	Episode 1	Episode 9	Not committed
Lars Fellows	23	Wolverhampton	Episode 1	Episode 9	Not committed
Ruben Bø Dower	24	London	Episode 1	Episode 9	Not committed
Adam Williams	27	Reading	Episode 1	Episode 8	Eliminated
Alex Hayden	28	Nevis, Caribbean	Episode 5	Episode 8	Eliminated
Jack Doherty	26	Glasgow	Episode 1	Episode 8	Eliminated
Baraka Meena	24	Berkshire	Episode 4	Episode 8	Eliminated
Justin Young	26	Sydney, Australia	Episode 4	Episode 8	Eliminated
Jordon Reid-Haigh	27	Leeds	Episode 1	Episode 5	Eliminated
Rory Jennings	22	Galway	Episode 1	Episode 3	Eliminated

=== Kiss Off Progress ===
	Episode 1	Episode 2	Episode 5	Episode 8	Episode 9
Aron	Jas	Jas	Jas	Jas	Jas
Jas	Aron	Aron	Aron	Aron	Aron
Jordan B	Jack S	Jordon R	Callum	Callum	Callum
Callum	Not in Masseria	Jack S	Jordan B	Jordan B	Jordan B
Hugh	Not in Masseria		Jack S	Jack S	Not Kissed (Episode 9)
Jack S	Jordan B	Callum	Hugh	Hugh	Not Kissed (Episode 9)
Lars	Jack D	Jack D	Ruben	Ruben	Not Kissed (Episode 9)
Ruben	Adam	Adam	Lars	Lars	Not Kissed (Episode 9)
Adam	Ruben	Ruben	Justin	Alex	Eliminated (Episode 8)
Alex	Not in Masseria			Adam	Eliminated (Episode 8)
Baraka	Not in Masseria		Jack D	Not Kissed (Episode 8)	
Jack D	Lars	Lars	Baraka	Not Kissed (Episode 8)	
Justin	Not in Masseria		Adam	Not Kissed (Episode 8)	
Jordon R	Rory	Jordan B	Not Kissed (Episode 5)		
Rory	Jordon R	Not Kissed (Episode 2)			

== International broadcast ==
The series was available to be streamed in New Zealand on TVNZ+, from 1 July 2023, and in Australia on 10 Play, from 13 September 2023. One year later, it was also made available in the Netherlands on VIDEOLAND starting 1 June 2024 and in Brazil, on Globoplay, from 12 November 2024. In Ireland, the show and I Kissed a Girl, were available on Virgin Media Two.

== Reception ==
Benjamin Lee in The Guardian said, "It's in the show's easy balance of the basic and the specific that it most succeeds, conversations over who is top or bottom casually mixed with inane flirting over cheap wine. At a cautious eight episodes, it's unlikely to infect the nation in quite the same way as the woozy, all-consuming Love Island but it's a fun and grounding reminder that we all deserve a chance to graft around the pool while a Dua Lipa song plays in the background. Luv is luv."

Writing for The Tab, Harrison Brocklehurst said, "True equality is us having the space to get bluntly pied on the telly, like Ben did to Ross. True equality is letting Bobski and Mikey have secret terrace snogs where they both end up with raging semis and Josh eye rolls his way into oblivion about it all. I want the messy gay drama that isn't RuPaul's Drag Race – and I Kissed A Boy is the carnage we deserve. I am salivating for more mess, more men and more Minogue."

The second series of I Kissed a Boy sparked controversy among conservative media with the inclusion of Lars Fellows, a transgender man. Transgender exclusionary group LGB Alliance argued that featuring a trans man pressured gay male participants to engage with someone who was assigned female at birth. However, the BBC emphasized that all contestants were matched based on their stated "dating preferences". Elsewhere, the show received praise for including transgender representation.

The decision to cancel I Kissed a Boy was met with criticism from the general public. They deemed it a step back for LGBTQ+ representation in the media. Digital Spy wrote that in a world where dating shows are afraid to even broach queerness, it was dangerous to cancel a show that completely revolved around the subject.

== Spin-off ==
Prior to the final episode of series 1 airing on 5 June 2023, the BBC announced that a spin-off of I Kissed a Boy for sapphic women titled I Kissed a Girl, would be commissioned. Dannii Minogue returned as host, with the programme commencing filming in September 2023. The programme debuted on 5 May 2024. In June 2025, it was confirmed the show would return for a second season.
