= Hilda (album) =

Studio album by Jessica Mauboy
- Released: 18 October 2019
- Length: 46:52
- Label: Sony
- Producer: Tushar Apte; Trevor Brown; Stuart Crichton; DNA; David Ryan Harris; Jamie Hartman; Zaire Koalo; Oak; Louis Schoorl

Jessica Mauboy chronology
The Secret Daughter Season Two: Songs from the Original 7 Series (2017)	Hilda (2019)	Yours Forever (2024)

Singles from Hilda
- 1. "Sunday" Released: 12 April 2019; 2. "Little Things" Released: 21 June 2019; 3. "Selfish" Released: 18 October 2019; 4. "Butterfly" Released: 14 August 2020

Hilda is the fourth studio album by Australian singer Jessica Mauboy, released on 18 October 2019 by Sony Music Australia. Named after Mauboy's middle name, Hilda marked the first time that Mauboy co-wrote every track on one of albums. The singer worked with a variety of producers on the album, including Tushar Apte, Stuart Crichton, DNA, David Ryan Harris, Jamie Hartman, Zaire Koalo, Oak, and Louis Schoorl.

The album became Mauboy's first album to debut at number one on the Australian Albums Chart. Hilda was nominated for Album of the Year at the 2020 National Indigenous Music Awards. It was also nominated for Album of the Year at the ARIA Music Awards of 2020.

== Background ==
About the album Mauboy said, "This record is a dedication to those women, to my grandmother and mother for being fierce and strong and how they have helped me to pursue this life and become a woman."

== Promotion ==
"Sunday" was released as the lead single from Hilda on 12 April 2019. The official video was released on 30 April 2019. The second single "Little Things" was released on 21 June 2019 and has peaked at number 25 on the ARIA Singles Chart. The third single "Selfish" was released on 18 October 2019. The lyric video was uploaded a day before with the official music video released on 18 December 2019. "Butterfly" was sent to radio on 14 August 2020 as the album's fourth single. An acoustic version was released digitally the same day.

=== Promotional singles ===
"Blessing" was released as the album's first promotional single in July 2019. "Just Like You" was released as the album's second promotional single on 2 August 2019. "Jealous" was released as the album's third and final promotional single in October 2019.

== Critical reception ==
Professional ratings
Review scores
Source	Rating
auspOp	5/5 stars

David from auspOp said "This album is an epic piece of storytelling that focuses on Jess's history and how it's shaped who she's become. While she has played a part in song writing across previous albums, she's never been quite so raw, honest and believable in her messages. This openness is what makes this album truly sing… They tug at your heartstrings and create such a strong connection, it's hard not to fall in love with each of them."

Jeff Jenkins from Stack Magazine wrote that "Hilda is a sassy collection that swings between urban, pop and ballads. And with such a potent voice, Mauboy is capable of making it all work. It's a mystery why she hasn't had more international success."

== Chart performance ==
Hilda debuted at number one on the Australian Albums Chart in the week of 3 November 2019. It was Mauboy's first original album to reach the chart's top spot.

== Track listing ==
Hilda track listing
No.	Title	Writer(s)	Producer(s)	Length
1.	"Blessing"	Mauboy; Anthony Egizii; David Musumeci; Maddie Crabtree	DNA	3:09
2.	"Come Runnin'"	Mauboy; Egizii; Musumeci; Maize Olinger	DNA	3:19
3.	"Selfish"	Mauboy; Egizii; Musumeci; Isabella Kearney-Nurse	DNA	3:26
4.	"Jealous"	Mauboy; Louis Schoorl; Crabtree	Schoorl	3:28
5.	"Better"	Mauboy; Schoorl; Kearney-Nurse	Schoorl	3:27
6.	"Little Things"	Mauboy; Egizii; Musumeci; Chiara Hunter	DNA	3:09
7.	"Get Back Up"	Mauboy; Schoorl; PJ Harding	Schoorl	3:37
8.	"Sunday"	Mauboy; Warren Felder; Trevor Brown; Zaire Koalo	Oak; Brown; Koalo	3:05
9.	"Tough Love"	Mauboy; Egizii; Musumeci; Harding	DNA	2:40
10.	"Who We're Meant to Be"	Mauboy; Egizii; Musumeci	DNA	4:05
11.	"Butterfly"	Mauboy; Jamie Hartman; Stuart Crichton	Hartman; Crichton	3:32
12.	"Never Ever"	Mauboy; Schoorl; Harding	Schoorl	3:26
13.	"Just like You"	Mauboy; David Ryan Harris; Hunter	Harris	3:25
14.	"Wish You Well"	Mauboy; Tushar Apte; Harding	Apte	3:05
Total length:				46:52

== Charts ==
=== Weekly charts ===
Weekly chart performance for Hilda
Chart (2019)	Peak position
Australian Albums (ARIA)	1

=== Year-end charts ===
Year-end chart performance for Hilda
Chart (2019)	Position
Australian Artist Albums (ARIA)	25

== Release history ==
Release history for Hilda
Region	Date	Format	Label	Catalogue	Ref.
Australia	18 October 2019	CD; digital download; streaming	Sony Music Australia	19075976102	

== See also ==
- List of number-one albums of 2019 (Australia)
