= Sunday (Jessica Mauboy song) =

Single by Jessica Mauboy

from the album Hilda
- Released: 12 April 2019
- Length: 3:03
- Label: Sony Music Australia
- Songwriter(s): Jessica Mauboy; William Zaire Simmons; Trevor Brown; Warren "Oak" Felder
- Producer(s): The Orphanage

Jessica Mauboy singles chronology
"We Got Love" (2018)	"Sunday" (2019)	"Little Things" (2019)

Music video
- "Sunday" on YouTube

"Sunday" is a song by Australian recording artist Jessica Mauboy. It was released digitally on 12 April 2019 as the lead single from Mauboy's fourth studio album, Hilda.

Upon release, Mauboy said: "My favourite part of the song is where the lyrics go 'I forgive you then you forget, you're sleeping even if you didn't make that bed', there is so much sass in that and I love this idea of creating emotionally how just by little things by not making a bed, folding the clothes, picking up your rubbish can be so irritating and annoying that those things if not said can filter through the day, or the next day or the week or the month and can turn into something really I guess tangy. But I loved how passionate those lyrics and how deep they are."

Speaking on radio station Nova 96.9, Mauboy revealed the song was inspired after a heated argument with her boyfriend.

== Music video ==
The music video was directed by Nick Waterman and released on 30 April 2019. The video was filmed in Broken Hill and Silverton in New South Wales. Mauboy told Brad from auspOp "There were these plains that went forever! It's called the Mundi Mundi Plains lookout and it was truly like spirits were walking around me... Bringing 'Sunday' to this kind of eerie mystical place was a pure joy. I knew instantly that it going to be one of the best things I've ever done."

== Reception ==
The Music Network said "The track is a feel-good bop inspired by her childhood memories and the pleasures of 'chilling on a Sunday afternoon'." Women in Pop said "The song is a lively, rollicking mix of funk, R&B and pop with some jazzy vibes thrown in, held together by a passionate vocal performance from Mauboy."

== Charts ==
Chart (2019)	Peak position
New Zealand Hot Singles (RMNZ)	33

== Release history ==
Country	Date	Format	Label
Australia	12 April 2019	Digital download; streaming	Sony Music Australia
