= Take It Home (Johnny Ruffo song) =

Single by Johnny Ruffo
- Released: 19 October 2012
- Genre: Dance-pop
- Length: 3:09
- Label: Sony Music Australia
- Songwriter(s): Johnny Ruffo; Michael Tan; Anthony Egizii; David Musumeci

Johnny Ruffo singles chronology
"On Top" (2012)	"Take It Home" (2012)	"Untouchable" (2013)

Music video
- "Take It Home" on YouTube

"Take It Home" is the second single by Australian singer Johnny Ruffo. It was written by Ruffo, Michael Tan, Anthony Egizii and David Musumeci. "Take It Home" was released digitally on 19 October 2012. A second single was released on 11 January 2013 including the 7th Heaven remix.

== Track listing ==
- Digital download
1. "Take It Home" – 3:09
- Digital EP and CD single
1. "Take It Home" – 3:09
2. "Take It Home" (7th Heaven Radio Edit) – 4:04
3. "Take It Home" (7th Heaven Club Mix) – 6:18

== Charts ==
Chart performance for "Take It Home"
Chart (2012)	Peak position
Australia (ARIA)	30

== Certifications ==
Certifications for "Take It Home"
Region	Certification	Certified units/sales
Australia (ARIA)	Gold	35,000^{^}
^{^} Shipments figures based on certification alone.
