= Thinking 'Bout Us =

Single by Dannii Minogue and Autone
- Released: 2 February 2024
- Length: 3:01
- Label: Central Station Records
- Songwriters: Brett Austin; Anthony Egizii; David Musumeci
- Producers: Dannii Minogue; DNA Songs; Autone

Dannii singles chronology
"We Could Be the One" (2023)	"Thinking 'Bout Us" (2024)

"Thinking 'Bout Us" is a song by Australian singer Dannii Minogue and Australian DJ and producer Autone, released as a single on 2 February 2024. The song is Autone's first original single.

== Reception ==
Connor Gotto from Retropop said "The self-love anthem sees Minogue at the peak of her pop powers, delivering a radiant vocal over Autone's bright keys and bouncing bass line."

== Track listings ==
Digital download
No.	Title	Length
1.	"Thinking 'Bout Us"	3:01

Digital download
No.	Title	Length
1.	"Thinking 'Bout Us" (UK VIP version)	3:01

Digital download Remixes
No.	Title	Length
1.	"Thinking 'Bout Us" (Random Soul remix)	3:40
2.	"Thinking 'Bout Us" (Love Foundation and Soul Seekerz remix)	3:19
3.	"Thinking 'Bout Us" (extended version)	3:58
4.	"Thinking 'Bout Us" (UK VIP extended version)	4:05
5.	"Thinking 'Bout Us" (Random Soul remix [extended])	6:06
6.	"Thinking 'Bout Us" (Love Foundation and Soul Seekerz remix [extended])	5:03
7.	"Thinking 'Bout Us" (Until Dawn remix)	3:36

Vinyl - side A
No.	Title	Length
1.	"Thinking 'Bout Us" (Original Extended remix)	3:58
2.	"Thinking 'Bout Us" (Random Soul remix [extended])	6:06
3.	"Thinking 'Bout Us" (UK VIP version)	3:01

Vinyl - side B
No.	Title	Length
1.	"Thinking 'Bout Us [extended]" (UK VIP version)	4:05
2.	"Thinking 'Bout Us" (Original Edit)	3:01
3.	"Thinking 'Bout Us" (acapella)

== Chart performance ==
"Thinking 'Bout Us" debuted at number 24 on the UK Singles Chart. Following its vinyl release in May 2024, the song peaked at number 3 on the UK Vinyl Singles Chart.

=== Charts ===
Chart performance for "Thinking 'Bout Us"
Chart (2024)	Peak position
Australian Independent Artist Singles (AIR)	2
UK Singles Downloads (OCC)	23
US Dance/Mix Show Airplay (Billboard)	9
