= Enough (Delta Goodrem song) =

Single by Delta Goodrem featuring Gizzle

from the album Wings of the Wild
- Released: 24 June 2016
- Genre: Pop; hip hop
- Length: 4:28
- Label: Sony
- Songwriters: Delta Goodrem; Glenda "Gizzle" Proby; Johnny Powers; Vince Pizzinga; Ameerah Roelants; Zac Poor
- Producer: Johnny Powers

Delta Goodrem singles chronology
| "Dear Life" (2016) | "Enough" (2016) | "The River" (2016) |

Music video
- "Enough" on YouTube

"Enough" is a song by Australian singer-songwriter Delta Goodrem, released as the third single alongside the pre-order of her fifth studio album Wings of the Wild. It features American rapper Gizzle and peaked at number 27 on the ARIA Singles Chart.

== Music video ==
The song's accompanying music video, directed by Matt Sharp, was premiered exclusively on Facebook on 10 July and posted on Vevo the next day. The video tells the story of an artist struggling with self-doubt, painting and repainting his canvas, before creating a giant painting of a face featuring the words 'I am enough'. The story is intercut with scenes of Goodrem, Gizzle, a full band and a choir performing the song in a church.

== Promotion ==
To promote "Enough", Goodrem performed the song with Gizzle on The Voice Australia on 2 July, Today on 4 July 2016 and The Footy Show on 6 July 2016.

== Charts ==
"Enough" debuted at number 46 on the ARIA singles chart, before peaking at number 27, in its third week.

=== Weekly charts ===
| Chart (2016) | Peak position |
|---|---|
| Australia (ARIA) | 27 |
| New Zealand Heatseekers (Recorded Music NZ) | 7 |

== Release history ==
| Country | Date | Format | Label |
|---|---|---|---|
| Australia | 24 June 2016 | Digital download | Sony Music Australia |
