= Fallin' (Jessica Mauboy song) =

Single by Jessica Mauboy

from the album The Secret Daughter Season Two: Songs from the Original 7 Series
- Released: 9 June 2017
- Genre: Synth-pop; reggae-pop; blue-eyed soul
- Length: 3:07
- Label: Sony Music Australia
- Songwriters: Jessica Mauboy; Ivy Adara; Peter James Harding; Louis Schoorl

Jessica Mauboy singles chronology
"Diamonds" (2017)	"Fallin'" (2017)	"Then I Met You" (2017)

Music video
- "Fallin'" on YouTube

"Fallin'" is a song by Australian recording artist Jessica Mauboy. It was released digitally on 9 June 2017 as the lead single from Mauboy's second soundtrack album, The Secret Daughter Season Two: Songs from the Original 7 Series. Mauboy performed the song live on The Voice Australia on 25 June 2017.

== Reception ==
Audio Premiere described the song as "a classic soulful slice of R&B infused with her tender and emotional vocals." "Fallin'" received three nominations at the 2017 ARIA Music Awards for Song of the Year, Best Pop Release and Best Video.

== Track listing ==
- Digital download / CD single
1. "Fallin'" (Kayla Rae Bonnici, Peter James Harding, Louis Schoorl) – 3:07

== Charts ==
=== Weekly charts ===
Chart (2017)	Peak position
Australia (ARIA)	11

=== Year-end charts ===
Chart (2017)	Position
Australia (ARIA)	83

== Certifications ==
Region	Certification	Certified units/sales
Australia (ARIA)	2× Platinum	140,000^{‡}
^{‡} Sales+streaming figures based on certification alone.

== Release history ==
Country	Date	Format	Label	Catalogue
Australia	9 June 2017	Digital download	Sony Music Australia	—N/a
Australia	23 June 2017	CD single	Sony Music Australia	88985454892
