= Nathaniel Willemse =

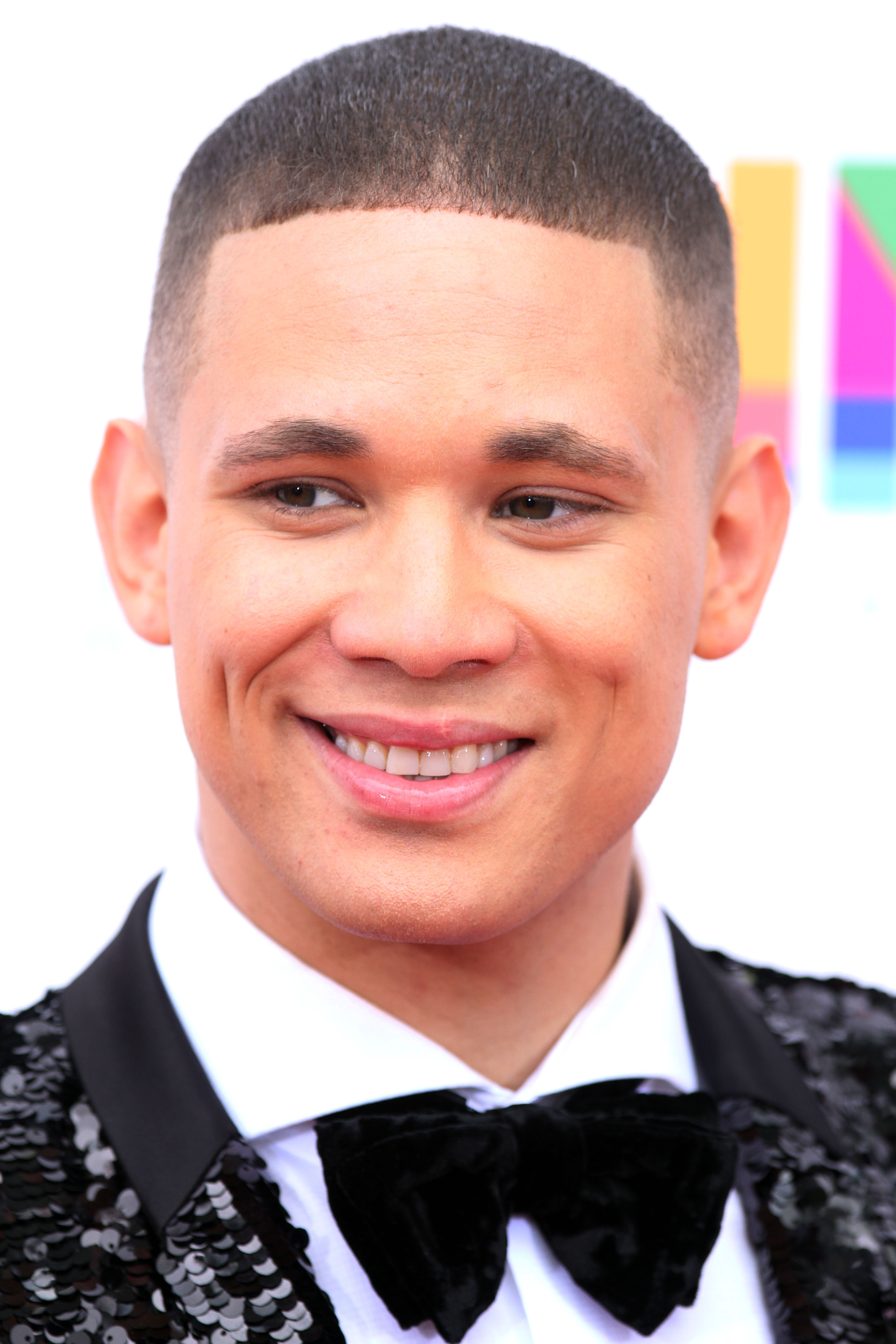
- Official Press Photo 2016

Background information
- Born: 3 July 1985 (age 41); Cape Town, South Africa
- Genres: R&B; pop
- Occupations: Singer; songwriter; producer
- Instruments: vocals; piano; guitar; bass; drums
- Years active: 2006–present
- Labels: Mummy's Boy Records (2008); Sony (2013–2016)
- Website: nathanielofficial.com

Nathaniel Willemse (born 3 July 1995), often known simply as Nathaniel, is a South African-born Australian singer and songwriter most notable for being the eighth contestant eliminated on the fourth season of The X Factor Australia. In 2013, he signed a recording contract with DNA Songs' label through Sony Music Australia, and released the single "You", which peaked at number four on the ARIA Singles Chart.

== Early life ==
Nathaniel Willemse was born in South Africa and moved to Frankston, Melbourne, Australia when he was six years old. He attended Karingal Park Secondary College, now known as McClelland College. In 2006, he auditioned for Australian Idol series four and made it to the top 24 round before being eliminated. On 22 January 2008, Willemse released his debut single "Vertigo" exclusively on iTunes, through Mummy's Boy Records. The single's release also included two B-side tracks, "Shall Be Told" and "Home", each co-written by Willemse. On 29 October 2011, Willemse independently released his first extended play, EP, and second single, "You Are the One". Before applying for The X Factor Australia in 2012, Willemse was a vocal coach and a wedding singer.

== Career ==
=== 2012: The X Factor Australia ===
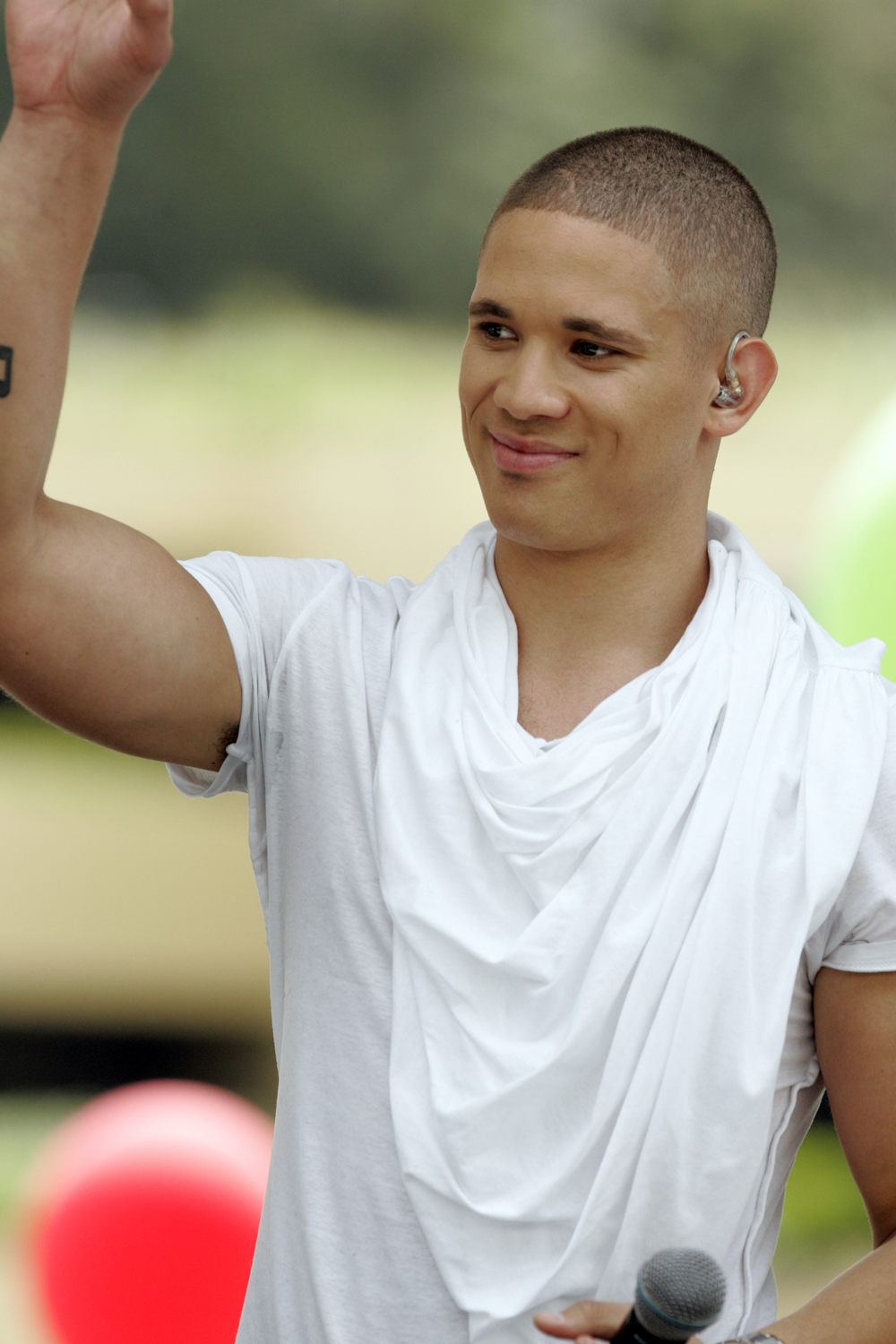
Willemse in 2012

Willemse successfully auditioned for the fourth season of The X Factor in 2012 singing John Mayer's "Gravity". During the super bootcamp stage of the competition, Willemse sang "I Gotta Feeling" by The Black Eyed Peas and "You Give Me Something" by James Morrison. Willemse made it to the home visits as part of the Over 25s category. For the first live performance show on 17 September 2012, Willemse sang Beyoncé's "Love on Top" and received praise from all four judges. Mel B called the performance "incredible" and said that his voice is "bloody marvellous", while Ronan Keating added that he has a lot of soul. Willemse then made his way through to the top six. His performance of "The Scientist" debuted at number 75 on the ARIA Singles Chart after his performance in the fourth week. In week seven, Willemse was placed in the bottom two with Samantha Jade after his performance of "Red" by Daniel Merriweather. The performance reached number 91 on the ARIA Singles Chart. In the final showdown he sang "Sexual Healing" by Marvin Gaye. Guy Sebastian labelled the decision as "stupid" while Keating said he was "embarrassed" by the viewer voting. After the judges split the decision at two votes all, Willemse was eliminated in deadlock after having the lowest number of votes.

==== Performances on The X Factor ====
denotes having reached the ARIA Singles Chart.
denotes having been in the bottom two.
denotes having been eliminated.

Show	Theme	Song	Original artist	Order	Result
Auditions	Free choice	"Gravity"	John Mayer	N/A	Through to super bootcamp
Super bootcamp	Free choice	"I Gotta Feeling"	The Black Eyed Peas	N/A	Through to home visits
Home Visits	Free choice	"When a Man Loves a Woman"	Percy Sledge	N/A	Through to live shows
Week 1	Judges' Choice	"Love on Top"	Beyoncé	11	Safe
Week 2	Party All Night	"Canned Heat"	Jamiroquai	4	Bottom two
Week 2	Final Showdown	"It Will Rain"	Bruno Mars	2	Saved
Week 3	Top 10 Hits	"Try a Little Tenderness"	Ray Noble Orchestra	8	Safe
Week 4	Legends	"The Scientist"	Coldplay	8	Safe
Week 5	1980s	"What's Love Got to Do with It"	Tina Turner	3	Safe
Week 6	Latest and Greatest	"Let Me Love You (Until You Learn to Love Yourself)"	Ne-Yo	4	Safe
Week 7	Made in Australia	"Red"	Daniel Merriweather	4	Bottom two
Week 7	Final Showdown	"Sexual Healing"	Marvin Gaye	2	Eliminated (6th)

=== 2013–2016: Yours ===
In January 2013, Willemse embarked on the X Factor Live Tour with Samantha Jade, The Collective, Bella Ferraro, Shiane Hawke and Jason Owen. They performed shows in the Gold Coast, Sydney, Melbourne, Adelaide and Perth. On 6 May 2013, Willemse announced on his Facebook page that he had signed a recording contract with Sony Music Australia. He is the first artist signed to DNA Songs' label through Sony. He released "You" on 27 September 2013, as his first single with the label. In Australia, it peaked at number four on the ARIA Singles Chart and was certified two times Platinum by the Australian Recording Industry Association for sales over 140,000 copies. On the New Zealand Singles Chart, "You" peaked at number 16. In November 2013, Willemse was the supporting act for Jessica Mauboy's To the End of the Earth Tour. On 24 January 2014, Willemse released a cover of "I Am Australian" with Dami Im, Jessica Mauboy, Justice Crew, Samantha Jade and Taylor Henderson, to coincide with the Australia Day celebrations. The song peaked at number 51 on the ARIA Singles Chart.

Willemse's next single "You're Beautiful" was released on 28 February 2014, and debuted at number 14 on the ARIA Singles Chart. A sixth single "Live Louder" was released on 5 September 2014 and peaked at number 4. It was certified Platinum by ARIA for sales exceeding 70,000 copies. Willemse returned to The X Factor on 15 September 2014 to perform the song live. In October 2014, Willemse performed at Australia's first ever neo-soul, jazz and hip-hop festival, Soulfest. In November 2014, he was the supporting act for Mariah Carey's Australian leg of her tour, The Elusive Chanteuse Show. In December 2014, Willemse and other Australian singers recorded a cover version of Kate Bush's "This Woman's Work" under the name "Hope for Isla and Jude", and released it as a charity single to help raise funds for two siblings who suffer from the rare disease Sanfilippo syndrome. Their version debuted at number 79 on the ARIA Singles Chart. Willemse's debut studio album Yours was released on 23 October 2015. On 8 December 2015, Nathaniel released a new single "Jungle Boogie", a Kool & the Gang cover. It was used as the promotional song in the season two launch campaign for the Australian version of I'm a Celebrity... Get Me Out of Here!. In March 2016, it was speculated that Willemse had been dropped by record company Sony Music, along with other X Factor finalists Reigan Derry, Marlisa Punzalan and Dean Ray. In June 2016, it was confirmed when Willemse announced he had signed a deal with 123 Agency.

=== 2017–present: "Vapours" ===
In January, Nathaniel confirmed the release of a new single "Vapours" on 27 January. "This single is about being intoxicated by someone, or by an experience. My head space at the time was I just wanted something different, honest and a little rebellious. I wanted to experiment with different sounds and sonic landscapes".

From October 2017 to January 2018, Willemse starred in "Let's Get it On" a musical production celebrating the life and music of Marvin Gaye.

== Personal life ==
On 11 January 2015, Willemse married his long-time girlfriend, model Fujan Erfanian on a tropical island in Langkawi, Malaysia. The couple had been dating since before Willemse made his debut in the public eye on The X Factor Australia.

== Discography ==
=== Studio albums ===
List of studio albums, with selected chart positions and certifications
Title	Album details	Peak chart positions
Title	Album details	AUS
Yours	Released: 23 October 2015; Label: DNA Songs / Sony Music Australia; Formats: CD, digital download	5

=== Extended plays ===
Title	Details
EP	Released: 29 October 2011; Formats: Digital download

=== Singles ===
Title	Year	Peak chart positions		Certifications	Album
Title	Year	AUS	NZ	Certifications	Album
"Vertigo"	2008	—	—		Non-album single
"You Are the One"	2011	—	—		EP
"You"	2013	4	16	ARIA: 2× Platinum	Yours
"I Am Australian" (with Dami Im, Jessica Mauboy, Justice Crew, Samantha Jade and Taylor Henderson)	2014	51	—		Non-album single
"You're Beautiful"	2014	14	—		Yours
"Live Louder"	2014	4	—	ARIA: Platinum	Yours
"Flava"	2015	163	—		Yours
"Always Be Yours"	2015	79	—		Yours
"Jungle Boogie"	2015	—	—		Non-album single
"Vapours"	2017	—	—		Non-album single
"Moon"	2018	—	—		Non-album single
"Mysterious Girl" (with Rowen Reecks)	2018	—	—		Non-album single
"Us"	2019	—	—		Non-album single
"—" denotes a recording that did not chart.

=== Other charted songs ===
Title	Year	Peak chart positions
Title	Year	AUS
"The Scientist"	2012	75
"What's Love Got to Do with It"	2012	118
"Red"	2012	91

=== Music videos ===
Title	Year	Director(s)
"You"	2013	Toby Angwin
"You're Beautiful"	2014	
"Live Louder"	2014	
"Always Be Yours"	2015	Nik Kacevski
"Vapours"	2017	Epik Films

== Tours ==
Headlining

- The X Factor Live Tour (2013)

Supporting act

- Jessica Mauboy's To the End of the Earth Tour (2013–14)
- Soulfest (2014)
- Mariah Carey's The Elusive Chanteuse Show: Australian leg (2014)

== Awards and nominations ==
=== APRA Awards ===
The APRA Awards are held in Australia and New Zealand by the Australasian Performing Right Association to recognise songwriting skills, sales and airplay performance by its members annually.

Year	Nominee / work	Award	Result	Ref.
2014	"You"	Pop Work of the Year	Nominated	
2014	"You"	Most Played Australian Work	Nominated	

=== ARIA Music Awards ===
The ARIA Music Awards is an annual awards ceremony that recognises excellence, innovation, and achievement across all genres of Australian music. They commenced in 1987.

Year	Nominee / work	Award	Result	Ref.
2014	"You"	Song of the Year	Nominated	
2015	"Live Louder"	Song of the Year	Nominated	

=== World Music Awards ===
The World Music Awards was an international award show founded in 1989 under the patronage of Albert II, Prince of Monaco and co-founder/executive producer John Martinotti. The event is based in Monte Carlo. It ran from 1989 to 2008, 2010 and 2014.

Year	Nominee / work	Award	Result	Ref.
2014	Nathaniel Willemse	World's Best Male Artist	Nominated	
2014	Nathaniel Willemse	World's Best Live Act	Nominated	
2014	Nathaniel Willemse	World's Best Entertainer of the Year	Nominated	
2014	"You"	World's Best Song	Nominated	
2014	"You"	World's Best Video	Nominated	
