= Yours Forever (Jessica Mauboy album) =

Studio album by Jessica Mauboy
- Released: 9 February 2024
- Length: 41:34
- Label: Warner Australia
- Producer: Audius; Butter Bath; Stephen Charles; Sam de Jong; DNA; James Gales; Len20; Nick Littlemore; Pacific Heights; Rudy Sandapa; Styalz Fuego

Jessica Mauboy chronology
Hilda (2019)	Yours Forever (2024)

Singles from Yours Forever
- 1. "Give You Love" Released: 11 August 2023; 2. "Flashback" Released: 10 November 2023; 3. "Never Giving Up" Released: 22 December 2023; 4. "Forget You" Released: 19 January 2024; 5. "I'm Sorry" Released: 14 June 2024

Yours Forever is the fifth studio album by Australian singer Jessica Mauboy, released on 9 February 2024 by Warner Music Australia. It is her debut on Warner after leaving Sony Music Australia in 2020.

Upon announcement of the album on 11 August 2023, Mauboy said "Yours Forever is me at my truest self, comfortable in my skin, not comparing myself or trying to be someone or something that anyone expects me to be. When you strip it all back, musically, it's beautiful melodies, storytelling lyrics, rhythms that connect with the soul, and it has a depth that I've never gone to or shared before."

The album was supported with a three-month Australian and New Zealand tour commencing on 12 March 2024 in Victoria.

The album was nominated for Album of the Year at the National Indigenous Music Awards 2024.

At the 2024 ARIA Music Awards, the album was nominated for Best Pop Release.

== Singles ==
"Give You Love", a duet with Jason Derulo was released as the lead single from Yours Truly on 11 August 2023. The song peaked at number 74 on the ARIA Chart, while its video was nominated for ARIA Award for Best Video at the 2023 awards.

"Flashback" was released on 10 November 2023 as the album's second single. Mauboy said "'Flashback' is a song that holds a very special place in my heart - this song captures the exhilarating feeling of falling in love". "Never Giving Up" was released as the third single on 22 December 2023. "Forget You" was released on 19 January 2024.

== Reception ==
Mary Varvaris from The Music said "Yours Forever is Jessica Mauboy at her realest and most transformative. She's utterly genuine as she jumps between gospel-inspired soul, fierce funk, effortless mainstream, vibey pop, trap and acoustic balladry." Varvaris said "She's not just the girl next door R&B singer you've come to know (or still expect), She's so much more."

Women in Pop called it "a stunning album that shows Mauboy at her absolute best - a kaleidoscope of sounds and emotions that explore multiple genres whilst still remaining cohesive and true to Mauboy."

== Track listing ==
Yours Forever track listing
No.	Title	Writer(s)	Producer(s)	Length
1.	"Yours Forever"	Jessica Mauboy; Kaelyn Behr; Shungudzo Kuyimba	Styalz Fuego	2:33
2.	"Underwater"	Mauboy; Toby Anagnostis; James Gales; Nick Littlemore; Lukas Martin	Butter Bath; Gales; Littlemore	2:41
3.	"The Loneliest I Ever Was"	Mauboy; Devin Abrams; PJ Harding	Styalz Fuego; Rudy Sandapa	2:50
4.	"Flashback"	Mauboy; Anagnostis; Gales; Littlemore	Butter Bath; Gales; Littlemore	2:57
5.	"Quite Like You"	Mauboy; Anagnostis; Gales; Littlemore	Butter Bath; Gales; Littlemore	2:42
6.	"Give You Love" (featuring Jason Derulo)	Shannon Busch; Stephen Mowat; Blessing Offor	Stephen Charles; Styalz Fuego; Sandapa	2:54
7.	"Whitney"	Mauboy; Glenn Hopper; Megan McInerney	Styalz Fuego; Len20	4:27
8.	"Tell 'Em"	Mauboy; Audius Mtawarira	Audius	2:50
9.	"Forget You"	Mauboy; Sam de Jong; Grace Pitts	De Jong	3:01
10.	"I'm Sorry"	Mauboy; Anthony Egizii; David Musumeci	DNA	3:21
11.	"Little Too Late" (featuring Miiesha)	Behr; Busch; Ryan Daly; Zev Troxler; Miiesha Young	Styalz Fuego; Sandapa	3:19
12.	"Goodbye"	Mauboy; Abrams; Harding; Kuyimba	Pacific Heights	3:20
13.	"Never Giving Up"	Mauboy; Anagnostis; Gales; Littlemore	Butter Bath; Gales; Littlemore	3:32
14.	"Yours Forever & Ever"	Mauboy; Behr; Kuyimba	Gales; Styalz Fuego	1:06
Total length:				41:34

== Personnel ==
- Jessica Mauboy – vocals
- Doug Wright – mixing (tracks 1, 5, 12)
- Neal H Pogue – mixing (tracks 2, 3, 6, 7, 9, 11)
- Peter Mayes – mixing (track 4)
- Audius – mixing (track 8)
- DNA – mixing (track 10)
- Steve Mac – mixing (track 13)
- Beck Whitton – mixing (track 14)
- Jason Derulo – vocals (track 6)
- Miiesha Young – vocals (track 11)
- Thomas Oliver – guitar (track 12)

== Charts ==
Chart performance for Yours Forever
Chart (2024)	Peak position
Australian Albums (ARIA)	10

== Release history ==
Release history and formats for Yours Forever
Region	Date	Format	Label	Catalogue	Reference
Various	9 February 2024	CD; digital download; streaming	Warner Music Australia	5419777821	
Australia	9 February 2024	LP	Warner Music Australia	5419777823	
