= Then I Met You (Jessica Mauboy song) =

Single by Jessica Mauboy

from the album The Secret Daughter Season Two: Songs from the Original 7 Series
- Released: 17 September 2017
- Genre: Pop
- Length: 3:13
- Label: Sony Music Australia
- Songwriters: Ivy Adara; Lindsey Jackson; Louis Schoorl

Jessica Mauboy singles chronology
"Fallin'" (2017)	"Then I Met You" (2017)	"We Got Love" (2018)

Music video
- "Then I Met You" on YouTube

"Then I Met You" is a song by Australian recording artist Jessica Mauboy, announced as a single on 8 September 2017 in a Sony Music Australia media statement. "Then I Met You" was released digitally on 17 September 2017 as the second single from Mauboy's second soundtrack album, The Secret Daughter Season Two: Songs from the Original 7 Series.

== Reception ==
In a review of the album, David from auspOp said ""Then I Met You" is Jess at her mid-tempo belter best. It’s a fairly straightforward song, but she gets the opportunity to showcase her great upper range." Thomas Bleach said "The RNB meets pop track goes back to her playful roots with a euphoric production and infectious hook" describing it as an "instantly catchy track".

== Video ==
The music video for "Then I Met You" was directed by Emma Tomelty and released on 20 October 2017. auspOp reviewed the video saying it's "Jess the pop star. In cool outfits. In cool locations. With an okay pop song."

== Track listing ==
- Digital download
1. "Then I Met You" – 3:13

== Charts ==
Chart (2017)	Peak position
Australia (ARIA)	114
Australian Digital Tracks (ARIA)	43
Australian Artist (ARIA)	17

== Release history ==
Country	Date	Format	Label	Catalogue
Australia	17 September 2017	Digital download, streaming	Sony Music Australia	G010003797359Y
