= Yours (Nathaniel album) =

Studio album by Nathaniel Willemse
- Released: 23 October 2015
- Recorded: 2013–15
- Genre: R&B; pop; soul
- Length: 34:40
- Label: DNA Songs; Sony Music Australia
- Producer: Arnthor Birgisson; DNA Songs; David Harris; Louis Schoorl; Lukipop; Styalz Fuego; Nathaniel Willemse; Daniel Kelaart

Singles from Yours
- 1. "You" Released: 27 September 2013; 2. "You're Beautiful" Released: 24 February 2014; 3. "Live Louder" Released: 5 September 2014; 4. "Flava" Released: 24 April 2015; 5. "Always Be Yours" Released: 9 October 2015

Yours is the debut studio album from Australian singer-songwriter, Nathaniel Willemse. It was released in Australia on 23 October 2015 and debuted at number 5 on the ARIA Albums Chart.

== Themes ==
Producer David Musumeci of DNA Songs explained: "From the moment we signed Nathaniel we knew we wanted to make a record with great emotional depth that would take you on a rollercoaster ride of emotions as you run through it, and we think we've achieved that with Yours. Nathaniel is a true talent and we hope the people enjoy listening to this album as much as we loved making it."

Willemse said of the album's theme: "The album covers the themes of love, relationships and break-ups, but it also covers being yourself, and being inspired and confident enough to make the right choices in life... For me, all these songs have their own particular story and sound."

== Review ==
Professional ratings
Review scores
Source	Rating
Renowned for Sound	4.5/5 stars

Marcus Floyd of Renowned for Sound gave the album 4.5 out of 5 saying, "Yours is jam packed with influences from various genres like synth-pop, funk and soul: a decent mix for a popular artist of today that's for sure." Adding "Nathaniel's vocal game is one of the strongest to grace radio, his knack for writing and delivering pop music is astounding, and his overall sound is addictive. Yours is one of the most decent debut albums brought out by a modern pop star that you'll find." Cameron Adams from The Herald Sun gave the album 3.5 out of 5 and said the album was "solid". He added this is "how to do commercial soul with style".

Jackie Smith of CargoArt said, "Yours [is] a collection of upbeat, radio-ready tracks set to hook many a listener. I dare you not to sing along to this collection of earworms." Smith's favourites include "Always Be Yours" and "Don't Let A Good Thing Go". Smith said these tracks show "Nathaniel's impressive vocal range and have a lyrical quality that will appeal to those who have a weakness for a heartfelt song".

== Track listing ==
Yours – Standard edition
No.	Title	Writer(s)	Producer(s)	Length
1.	"Animals"	David Musumeci; Willemse; Anthony Egizii; David Harris	DNA Songs; David Harris	3:31
2.	"Flava"	Musumeci; Willemse; Egizii; Louis Schoorl	DNA Songs; Louis Schoorl	3:05
3.	"Live Louder"	Musumeci; Willemse; Egizii; Harris	DNA Songs; Harris	3:09
4.	"Extinct"	Musumeci; Willemse; Egizii; Harris	DNA Songs	3:48
5.	"You"	Musumeci; Willemse; Egizii; Harris	DNA Songs	3:21
6.	"Always Be Yours"	Willemse; Musumeci; Egizii	DNA Songs	4:12
7.	"Addicted"	Adam Argyle; Emma Birdsall; Willemse; Louis Schoorl	DNA Songs; Louis Schoorl	3:25
8.	"You're Beautiful"	Willemse; Musumeci; Egizii	DNA Songs	2:59
9.	"Bedroom"	Kaelyn Behr; Willemse	Styalz Fuego	3:28
10.	"Don't Let a Good Thing Go"	Gary Clark; Lukasz Duchnowski; Willemse; Arnthor Birgisson	Arnthor; Lukipop	3:42
Total length:				34:40

Yours – Sanity deluxe bonus disc
No.	Title	Writer(s)	Producer(s)	Length
1.	"I've Been Thinking About You"	Jimmy Helms; Jimmy Chambers; George Chandler; William Henshall	Daniel Kelaart; Nathaniel Willemse	3:35
2.	"Sign Your Name"	Terence Trent D'Arby	Kelaart; Willemse	3:40
3.	"Easy Lover"	Philip Bailey; Phil Collins; Nathan East	Kelaart; Willemse	4:29
4.	"She Drives Me Crazy"	Roland Gift; David Steele	Kelaart; Willemse	5:13
5.	"If You Don't Know Me by Now"	Gamble and Huff	Kelaart; Willemse	3:37

== Charts ==
Chart (2015)	Peak position
Australian Albums (ARIA)	5

== Release history ==
Region	Date	Format	Edition(s)	Label	Catalogue
Australia	23 October 2013	CD; digital download	Standard, deluxe	DNA Songs, Sony Music Australia	88875012952
