= Gizzle =

American rapper

- Also known as: Lady G Da Real Deal
- Born: Glenda Raniece Proby; December 1, 1987 (age 38); Los Angeles, California, U.S.
- Genre: East Coast hip-hop
- Occupations: Rapper; songwriter
- Years active: 2007–present
- Label: The GZL Company

Glenda Raniece Proby (born December 1, 1987), better known by her stage names Gizzle and Lady G Da Real Deal, is an American rapper and songwriter. Beginning her career in 2008 as a ghostwriter for artists such as Lil' Fizz and Snoop Dogg, she has since appeared as a recording artist on albums for Puff Daddy, G-Eazy and Ty Dolla Sign, among others.

Proby released her debut mixtape, 7 Days in Atlanta, in 2017. That same year, she released the single "Get Loud For Me", which has been used in advertising for BOSE, Adidas, and the Los Angeles Lakers. Her 2021 song "Go Up" was used in a similar manner for the WBNA and the short-lived Google Stadia service.

== Career ==
=== 2007–2008: Early career ===
From South Los Angeles, Proby showed a talent for writing from a young age, composing poetry and lengthy letters to her father when he was in jail. She started rapping as a teenager under the stage name Lady G Da Real Deal, regularly attending freestyle rap events in Los Angeles and San Bernardino county. She recorded a demo with Rhythm D of Ruthless Records and was offered a recording contract at the age of 17. However, she was encouraged by her manager, Cudda Love, to pursue songwriting for others instead.

In 2007, she gained her first writing credit on the Lil' Fizz track "Beds". She was then invited by producer Teddy Riley to write for Snoop Dogg's 2008 album Ego Trippin'. She is credited on the tracks "Gangsta Like Me" and "Can't Say Goodbye", both of which were regularly highlighted in positive reviews of the album.

=== Ghostwriting ===
Since her early work with Riley and Snoop Dogg, Proby has become a prolific hip hop ghostwriter, working with prominent artists including Kanye West, Nicki Minaj, Meek Mill, Boosie Badazz, Kevin Gates, G-Eazy, Iggy Azalea, Trey Songz, Travis Scott and T.I. Two of her most frequent collaborators are Ty Dolla Sign, who she has worked with since 2008, and Puff Daddy (Sean Combs), whose albums MMM and No Way Out 2 she contributed to extensively.

Unusually for a female writer, Proby writes primarily for male rappers, but has been praised for successfully "getting inside the heads" of artists and working closely with them to compose songs that match their personal styles. She is also one of very few queer women in the hip hop industry. Ty Dolla Sign has stated that this is an advantage in the often hypermasculine and hypersexualised world of hip hop, "you know she gets both sides 'cause Gizzle got bitches too!"

=== 2008–present: Solo career ===
Proby met singer Ty Dolla Sign in 2008, with whom she became a frequent songwriting partner prior to his mainstream breakthrough. Having previously performed as Lady G, she ditched the name in favor of Gizzle in 2011, posting several videos on her YouTube channel. In 2015, she guest performed alongside Ty Dolla Sign on Puff Daddy's single, "You Can Be My Lover", from the latter's commercial mixtape MMM (Money Making Mitch). The following year, her appearance in the video for the track, as an unexpected "butch lesbian leading the song, rapping about hollering at women in the middle of a misogynistic smorgasbord," became a breakout performance for Proby. That same year, she received numerous songwriting credits on Ty Dolla Sign's debut album Free TC, including for the single "Saved." In 2016, she was featured on Australian singer-songwriter Delta Goodrem's single "Enough", taken from Goodrem's fifth studio album Wings of the Wild.

Proby released her debut mixtape, 7 Days in Atlanta, in January 2017. The EP was produced in a single, week-long trip to Atlanta, with one of seven songs being recorded each day. Gizzle plans to continue this concept with further 7 Days mixtapes recorded in other cities, including Los Angeles, Philadelphia and Denver. Revolt described the EP as "a serious reminder of why [Gizzle] is one of the best in the business." She was featured on the Lupe Fiasco 2017 single "Jump", from his album Drogas Light.

In 2021, Proby was featured on the soundtrack for the Netflix series Arcane on the track "Dynasties and Dystopia" alongside Denzel Curry and Bren Joy.

== Discography ==
=== EPs ===
List of studio extended plays, with selected details
Title	Details
We All We Got	Released: 2022; Formats: Digital download, streaming

=== As featured artist ===
List of singles as featured artist, with selected chart positions, showing year released and album name
Title	Year	Peak chart positions		Album
Title	Year	AUS	NZ	Album
"Enough" (Delta Goodrem featuring Gizzle)	2016	27	7	Wings of the Wild
