= Untouchable (Johnny Ruffo song) =

Single by Johnny Ruffo
- Released: 12 July 2013
- Genre: Pop; R&B
- Length: 3:19
- Label: Sony Music Australia
- Songwriter(s): Johnny Ruffo; Cliff Raux; Michael Tan; Gary Pinto
- Producer(s): Michael Tan; Louis Schoorl

Johnny Ruffo singles chronology
"Take It Home" (2012)	"Untouchable" (2013)	"She Got That O" (2015)

Music video
- "Untouchable" on YouTube

"Untouchable" is the third single by Australian singer Johnny Ruffo. It was written by Ruffo, Michael Tan, Cliff Raux, and Gary Pinto, and produced by Michael Tan and Louis Schoorl. It was released on 12 July 2013.

== Background ==
While talking about the track, Ruffo said "If you listen to the artists that influenced me – Justin Timberlake, Michael Jackson, Stevie Wonder and Queen – and you listen to their vocal production, it's really intricate. We really tried to emulate the sound of a Quincy Jones-type production on this song. The idea was trying to bring some of the old skool vibe back, and I think that's sort of making a return with artists like Bruno Mars, Daft Punk/Pharrell and Robin Thicke anyway. In that sense it's actually the perfect time to release a song like this."

== Promotion ==
Ruffo did a number of in-store performances in Westfield throughout July in Victoria, New South Wales, Queensland and Western Australia as well as a performance on Sunrise on July 25, 2013.

== Charts ==
Chart performance for "Untouchable"
Chart (2013)	Peak position
Australia (ARIA)	39

== Release history ==
Release history and formats for "Untouchable"
Region	Date	Format	Label
Australia	12 July 2013	Digital download	Sony Music Australia
