= We Got Love (Jessica Mauboy song) =

2018 single by Jessica Mauboy

Single by Jessica Mauboy
- Released: 9 March 2018
- Recorded: 2018
- Genre: Dance-pop
- Length: 3:22
- Label: Sony
- Songwriters: Anthony Egizii; David Musumeci; Jessica Mauboy

Jessica Mauboy singles chronology
"Then I Met You" (2017)	"We Got Love" (2018)	"Sunday" (2019)

Music video
- "We Got Love" on YouTube

Eurovision Song Contest 2018 entry
- Country: Australia
- Artist: Jessica Mauboy
- Language: English
- Composer: Anthony Egizii, David Musumeci
- Lyricists: Anthony Egizii, David Musumeci, Jessica Mauboy

Finals performance
- Semi-final result: 4th
- Semi-final points: 212
- Final result: 20th
- Final points: 99

Entry chronology
- ◄ "Don't Come Easy" (2017)
- "Zero Gravity" (2019) ►

Official performance videos
- "We Got Love" (second semi-final) on YouTube "We Got Love" (grand final) on YouTube

"We Got Love" is a song performed by Australian singer Jessica Mauboy. The song was released on 9 March 2018 and is co-written by Mauboy with DNA Songs' Anthony Egizii and David Musumeci. It represented Australia in the Eurovision Song Contest 2018 in Lisbon, Portugal. The single reached the top 50 on the ARIA Charts.

== Eurovision Song Contest ==
In May 2014 Jessica Mauboy performed "Sea of Flags" as a non-competing, guest at the second semi-final of the Eurovision Song Contest 2014 in Copenhagen, Denmark. On 11 December 2017 "We Got Love", sung by Mauboy, was confirmed by Special Broadcasting Service (SBS) as Australia's representative for the 2018 contest. The song competed in the second semi-final, held on 10 May 2018 in Lisbon, Portugal, and was announced as one of the ten qualifiers for the grand final.

In the final, Mauboy performed 16th and "We Got Love" finished in 20th position with 99 points.

== Track listing ==
Digital download
No.	Title	Length
1.	"We Got Love"	3:22

Digital download (7th Heaven remix)
No.	Title	Length
1.	"We Got Love"	3:26

Digital download (Tobtok remix)
No.	Title	Length
1.	"We Got Love"	3:35

Digital download (Country Club Martini Crew remix)
No.	Title	Length
1.	"We Got Love"	3:24

Digital download (Glammstar remix)
No.	Title	Length
1.	"We Got Love"	3:27

== Charts ==
Chart performance for "We Got Love"
Chart (2018)	Peak position
Australia (ARIA)	31
France (SNEP)	148
Scottish Singles Sales (Official Charts)	60
Sweden (Sverigetopplistan)	86
UK Singles Downloads (Official Charts)	58

== Release history ==
Region	Date	Format	Label
Worldwide	9 March 2018	Digital download	Sony
Australia	11 May 2018	CD single	Sony
Australia	18 May 2018	Digital remixes	Sony
