= Dear Life (Delta Goodrem song) =

Single by Delta Goodrem

from the album Wings of the Wild
- Released: 6 May 2016
- Genre: Pop
- Length: 3:09
- Label: Sony
- Songwriter(s): Delta Goodrem; Anthony Egizii; David Musumeci
- Producer(s): Delta Goodrem; DNA

Delta Goodrem singles chronology
"Wings" (2015)	"Dear Life" (2016)	"Enough" (2016)

Music video
- "Dear Life" on YouTube

"Dear Life" is a song by Australian singer-songwriter Delta Goodrem, released as the second single from her fifth studio album Wings of the Wild. It was written and produced by Goodrem with Anthony Egizii and David Musumeci, known as DNA Songs. Sony Music released it as a digital download and CD single on 6 May 2016. "Dear Life" is a piano-driven pop ballad, with soft strings and a resounding beat. Lyrically, "Dear Life" focuses on self-doubt, and the questions one asks themselves at important stages of their life. Goodrem described it as a letter to life.

== Background and release ==
In late 2015, Goodrem and DNA Songs got together again to write a follow-up single to her number one hit "Wings". The song was initially meant to be an upbeat dance song. One night late in the studio, Goodrem sat down at the piano and started to play a soft melody. Eventually they began writing the words and working on it over the next few months and decided to release it as a single over the more upbeat song. Goodrem made the announcement after a social media campaign where she posted small portions of the cover art on several social medias with the caption "#DearLife". The hashtag trended number one on Twitter in Australia, and the next morning she announced the single. She said that she had only just finished working on the song a few days prior to the announcement.

== Commercial performance ==
"Dear Life" debuted on the Australian ARIA Singles Chart at number three in the week ending 13 May 2016, becoming the week's highest debut.

== Music video ==
The song's accompanying music video was directed by Anthony Rose and was released on 13 May 2016. It features Goodrem playing piano and singing in front of a giant screen playing videos corresponding to the lyrics. The Anthony Rose directed music video was nominated for Best Video at the ARIA Music Awards of 2016.

== Promotion ==
To promote "Dear Life", Goodrem performed the song on the 2016 TV Week Logie Awards. She also performed the song on The Footy Show and Today. She did a small tour of signings across Victoria, New South Wales and Queensland in April and May.

== Track listing ==
- Digital download
1. "Dear Life" – 3:09
- CD single
1. "Dear Life" – 3:09
2. "Dear Life" (acoustic version) – 3:09

== Charts ==
Chart (2016)	Peak position
Australia (ARIA)	3

== Certifications ==
}

Region	Certification	Certified units/sales
Australia (ARIA)	Gold	35,000^{‡}
^{‡} Sales+streaming figures based on certification alone.

== Release history ==
Country	Date	Format	Label
Australia	6 May 2016	CD single; Digital download	Sony Music Australia
Australia	13 May 2016	Spotify	Sony Music Australia
