= Charley Marlowe =

English television presenter (born 2000)

- Born: 21 June 2000 (age 26); North Yorkshire, England
- Education: University of Salford
- Occupations: Influencer; television narrator and presenter
- Television: I Kissed a Girl

Charley Marlowe (born 21 June 2000) is an English social media influencer, television narrator and presenter. After attending the University of Salford and working on the production team for various British television series, she began to share videos on TikTok. Marlowe began to amass a large online following and was contracted for various presenting roles, including narrating the BBC Three dating series I Kissed a Girl and presenting shows on BBC Radio 1.

== Life and career ==
Marlowe was born in North Yorkshire, but has never lived there and classifies herself as from Liverpool. However, her family moved around a lot when she was a child, including a period of living abroad. Marlowe attended drama classes aged 11, where she appeared in various stage productions and school musicals, including portraying Pumbaa in The Lion King. Despite enjoying it, Marlowe has recalled that she "just wanted to be around [her] mum's mates, a gaggle of middle aged women". Growing up, she was a big fan of Coronation Street, as well as watching other freeview programming since they could not afford Sky. Marlowe is a lesbian and has ADHD.

Various programmes inspired Marlowe to work in television, with her wanting to become a presenter. She recalled reading Holly Willoughby's Wikipedia article, where it read that she was scouted to be a model whilst in a café, which she knew would not happen to her. Whilst working at Vauxhall Motors, she exclaimed that she wanted to be like Peter Kay, to which a co-worker said that she should go to Salford, like he did. Marlowe then attended the University of Salford and worked on various television production teams, including Naked Attraction. Whilst at university, she began posting videos on TikTok, with various videos seeing virality. She then attained a management team and began to be booked for presenting gigs.

In 2024, Marlowe was cast as the narrator for the BBC Three dating series I Kissed a Girl; it marked her debut voiceover role. That same year, she presented digital content for the British Academy Television Awards, interviewing various celebrities. In December 2024, Marlowe placed third on an episode of Celebrity Mastermind; her specialist subject was Jane McDonald. In March 2025, she hosted a Lesbian Visibility Week panel for Queer Britain. In November 2025, Marlowe was the presenter of all backstage content for Children in Need. That same month, she won Entertainment Creator of the Year at the British TikTok Awards.

Marlowe became a presenter for BBC Radio 1's early breakfast show throughout August 2025. On her casting, she said that she planned to play "as much Jane McDonald and Kylie Minogue as the BBC allow. Otherwise you can expect anything from a show tune to Madonna". In July 2026, it was announced that Marlowe would join Radio 1 permanently to co-host the station's Group Chat show with Vicky Hawkesworth from 11 September 2026.

== Filmography ==
Year	Title	Role	Notes
2022	Naked Attraction	Production Team	3 episodes
2022	Peacock	Production Assistant	1 episode
2023	The Family Pile	Production Assistant	6 episodes
2023	Archie	Production Secretary	3 episodes
2024–2026	I Kissed a Girl	Narrator	
2024	Celebrity Mastermind	Herself	Contestant; third place
2025	Big Boys	Daisy Mould	1 episode
2025	Children in Need	Presenter	Digital host

== Awards and nominations ==
Year	Organisation	Category	Nominee(s)/work(s)	Result	Ref.
2025	TikTok Awards UK & Ireland	Entertainment Creator of the Year	Herself	Won	
2025	CelebMix Awards	Social Media Personality	Herself	Pending	
