= The River (Delta Goodrem song) =

Single by Delta Goodrem

from the album Wings of the Wild
- B-side: "You & You Alone"
- Released: 6 October 2016
- Genre: Pop
- Length: 3:04
- Label: Sony Music
- Songwriters: Delta Goodrem; David Hodges; Steven Solomon
- Producer: Hodges

Delta Goodrem singles chronology
"Enough" (2016)	"The River" (2016)	"Vente Pa' Ca" (2016)

Music video
- "The River" on YouTube

"The River" is a song by Australian singer-songwriter Delta Goodrem, released as the fourth single from her fifth studio album, Wings of the Wild (2016). It was written by Goodrem, along with David Hodges and Steven Solomon, and produced by Hodges. It was sent to radio on 23 September 2016 as the fourth single from the album. The song tells the story of a woman walking in on her lover cheating on her, and murdering him as a result. "A volatile relationship and getting rid of that person and having a second chance."

== Background ==
Goodrem has said that the song is a story and that the theme is "one of redemption, about cleansing off volatile relationships and washing off that energy and starting a new."

== Promotion ==
Goodrem went on a short promo tour in New Zealand in September 2016 to promote the song. She also appeared on The Project the night prior to the single's release. Goodrem performed the song on the NRL Footy Show and at Nickelodeon Slimefest 2016. She also performed the song on her national Wings of the Wild Tour.

== Critical response ==
Cameron Adams of news.com.au likened the song to Adele's "Rolling in the Deep" and Beyoncé's "Daddy Lessons", saying that it "demonstrates in three minutes that 15 years into her career she’s still able to surprise".

== Music video ==
In mid-September 2016, Goodrem began posting teasers for the upcoming music video. The teasers featured a man running among dark, murky forests. On 22 September 2016, she appeared on The Project to deliver a preview for the music video. The video was released the next day via-Goodrem's Facebook. It features Goodrem and a man kissing, caressing and running around together. Goodrem then finds out that the man is cheating on her, and ends up suing him in court. The video ends with Goodrem going to a river, with several people draped in white cloth lowering her down into the water, cleansing her of her bad relationships and allowing her to start anew.

== Track listing ==
- Digital single
1. "The River" – 3:04
- CD single
1. "The River" (Miles Walker Mix)
2. "You & You Alone"
- Digital EP
1. "The River" (Miles Walker Mix) 3:02
2. "You & You Alone" 3:39
3. "Morse Code" 4:37

"Morse Code" was previously an exclusive download for Goodrem's Wings of the Wild Tour meet&greet purchasers.

== Charts ==
Chart (2016)	Peak position
Australia (ARIA)	58

== Release history ==
List of release dates, showing formats, label, editions and reference
Region	Date	Format(s)	Label	Ref.
Australia	6 October 2016	CD single	Sony Music Australia	
