= Only Human (Delta Goodrem song) =

Single by Delta Goodrem

from the album Wings of the Wild
- Released: 13 March 2015
- Genre: Pop
- Length: 3:28
- Label: Sony
- Songwriters: Delta Goodrem; Vince Pizzinga; Pete Nappi
- Producer: Vince Pizzinga

Delta Goodrem singles chronology
"Love... Thy Will Be Done" (2014)	"Only Human" (2015)	"Wings" (2015)

Music video
- "Only Human" on YouTube

"Only Human" is a song by Australian singer-songwriter Delta Goodrem. The stripped-back piano ballad was written by Goodrem, Vince Pizzinga and Pete Nappi. It was released as a digital download on 13 March 2015 to coincide with her return to Neighbours for the show's 30th anniversary. Goodrem returned for three episodes and performed "Only Human" on the show as her character Nina Tucker during the episode broadcast on 19 March.

== Charts ==
Chart (2015)	Peak position
Australia (ARIA)	46

== Release history ==
Country	Date	Format	Label
Australia	13 March 2015	Digital download	Sony Music Australia
Europe	13 March 2015	Digital download	Sony Music Australia
New Zealand	13 March 2015	Digital download	Sony Music Australia
Australia	8 May 2015	CD single	Sony Music Australia
