= Little Things (Jessica Mauboy song) =

2019 single by Jessica Mauboy

Single by Jessica Mauboy

from the album Hilda
- Released: 21 June 2019
- Length: 3:09
- Label: Sony Music Australia
- Songwriter(s): Jessica Mauboy; David Musumeci; Anthony Egizii; Chiara Hunter

Jessica Mauboy singles chronology
"Sunday" (2019)	"Little Things" (2019)	"Selfish" (2019)

"Little Things" is a song by Australian recording artist Jessica Mauboy. It was released digitally on 21 June 2019 as the second single from Mauboy's fourth studio album, Hilda.

Upon released, Mauboy explained "This song is everything we want to tell our loved ones... to remind them that all we want is to be loved and appreciated in all of the things we do." adding "This song could also be felt in a way that you could be an eight year old girl or boy and want to feel loved by your parents, trying to catch their attention when your parents aren't watching, to a 20 year old sharing their deepest experience and not getting that back in return from the one they love, (or) to a 50 year old who could has lost their loved one and is haunted by memories of what was unsaid."

She further wrote on her Instagram that "Little Things" "holds a special place in my heart".

At the ARIA Music Awards of 2019, the song was nominated for two awards Best Female Artist and Best Video.

At the APRA Music Awards of 2020, the song was shortlisted for Song of the Year.

== Reception ==
Lauren from Sounds of Oz said "It's intimate and powerful, with an emotional maturity that's so compelling" saying "[it] may be her best work yet."

== Music video ==
The music video for "Little Things" was released on 31 July 2019. Shot in one continuous take, Mauboy breaks down in tears during the video and said "I'm really proud of this video; it's me at my rawest and I can't wait to see everyone's reaction to it."

== Track listing ==
CD single
No.	Title	Writer(s)	Length
1.	"Little Things"	Jessica Mauboy; David Musumeci; Anthony Egizii; Chiara Hunter	3:09
2.	"Sunday"	Mauboy; Warren "Oak" Felder; Trevor Brown; William Zaire Simmons	3:03
3.	"Blessing"	Mauboy; Musumeci; Egizii; Madeline Crabtree	3:09

== Charts ==
=== Weekly charts ===
Weekly chart performance for "Little Things"
Chart (2019)	Peak position
Australia (ARIA)	25
Australia Digital Song Sales (Billboard)	6
New Zealand Hot Singles (RMNZ)	38

=== Year-end charts ===
Year-end chart performance for "Little Things"
Chart (2019)	Position
Australian Artist (ARIA)	22

== Certifications ==
Region	Certification	Certified units/sales
Australia (ARIA)	2× Platinum	140,000^{‡}
^{‡} Sales+streaming figures based on certification alone.

== Release history ==
Country	Date	Format	Label	Catalogue
Australia	21 June 2019	Digital download; streaming	Sony Music Australia	
Australia	9 August 2019	CD single	Sony Music Australia	19075971832
