= Johnny Ruffo =

Australian singer and actor (1988–2023)

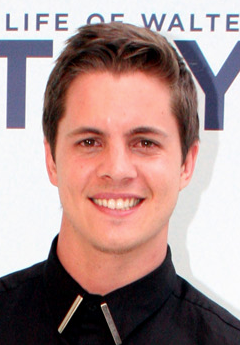
- Ruffo at the premiere of Secret Life of Walter Mitty in Sydney, 2013
- Born: John Patrick Ruffo; 8 March 1988; Perth, Western Australia
- Died: 10 November 2023 (aged 35); Sydney, Australia
- Known for: Home and Away as Chris Harrington; Contestant on The X Factor; Contestant on Dancing with the Stars
- Musical career
- Genre: Dance-pop
- Occupations: Singer; songwriter; musician; dancer; actor; television presenter
- Instruments: Guitar; piano; vocals
- Years active: 2008–2023
- Labels: Sony Music Australia (2011–2013); Johnny Ruffo Music (2014–2023)
- Website: johnnyruffoofficial.com

John Patrick Ruffo (8 March 1988 – 10 November 2023) was an Australian singer, songwriter, musician, dancer, actor, and television presenter. He rose to prominence after being the last contestant eliminated on the third season of The X Factor Australia. His debut single "On Top" (2012), peaked at number fourteen on the ARIA Singles Chart and was certified platinum. His second single "Take It Home" (2012), peaked at number thirty in Australia and earned a gold music certification. In total he released seven singles during his career.

Outside of music Ruffo ventured into reality television and won the twelfth season of Dancing with the Stars Australia. In 2013, he made his acting debut in Home and Away, portraying the role of Chris Harrington until 2016. For his role he earned a Logie Nomination for Most Popular New Talent.

== Early life ==
John Patrick Ruffo was born on 8 March 1988, in Balcatta, a suburb of Perth, Western Australia, to parents Jill and Pascoe Ruffo. Ruffo's parents separated when he was three years old. He spent most of his youth living in a small Homeswest unit with his mother. At age 12, he began pursuing his dream in music, following in the footsteps of his idol, Michael Jackson. He also taught himself how to play the guitar and piano, and wrote his first song at age 14. Ruffo was educated at Balcatta Senior High School. Before entering The X Factor, he worked as a concreter and got into the business thanks to his father who works in the trade. He also performed around Perth with electropop band, Supanova.

== Career ==
=== 2011: The X Factor Australia ===
Ruffo successfully auditioned for the third season of The X Factor Australia in 2011, singing Jay Sean's "Do You Remember". He eventually reached the live shows and was mentored by Guy Sebastian. On 22 November 2011, it was announced that he was the last contestant eliminated in the competition, while fellow contestant Reece Mastin was announced as the winner.

Ruffo performed the following songs on The X Factor:

Show	Song choice	Original Artist	Theme	Result
Auditions	"Do You Remember"	Jay Sean	Free choice	Through to bootcamp
Bootcamp	"With You"	Chris Brown	Free choice	Through to home visits
Bootcamp	"The Edge of Glory"	Lady Gaga	Free choice	Through to home visits
Home visits	"Burn"	Usher	Free choice	Through to live shows
Live show 1	"Moves Like Jagger"	Maroon 5	Judges' choice	Safe
Live show 2	"Down"	Jay Sean	Party anthems	Safe
Live show 3	"Here Without You"	3 Doors Down	Rock	Safe
Live show 4	"I'd Do Anything for Love (But I Won't Do That)"	Meat Loaf	The 90s	Bottom two
Live show 4 (bottom two)	"Just the Way You Are"	Bruno Mars	Free choice	Safe
Live show 5	"What Goes Around... Comes Around"	Justin Timberlake	Number-one hits	Safe
Live show 6	"Lost Without You"	Delta Goodrem	Australian hits	Bottom two
Live show 6 (bottom two)	"Billie Jean"	Michael Jackson	Free choice	Safe
Live show 7	"Without You"	David Guetta ft. Usher	Dance	Safe
Live show 8	"Sir Duke"	Stevie Wonder	Legends	Safe
Semi-final	"So Sick"	Ne-Yo	Emotional song	Safe
Semi-final	"Tonight Tonight"	Hot Chelle Rae	Uplifting song	Safe
Final	"Do You Remember"	Jay Sean	Audition song	Eliminated
Final	"Sir Duke"	Stevie Wonder	Song of the series	Eliminated
Final	"Shoop"/"Push It" (with Salt-n-Pepa)	Salt-n-Pepa	Superstar duet	Eliminated
Final	"You Don't Wanna Know"	Ruffo	Winner's single	Eliminated

=== 2011–2014: record deal, Dancing with the Stars and Home and Away ===
Shortly after the completion of The X Factor, Ruffo told News Limited on 30 November 2011 that he was offered a record deal with a major record label, whose name he was not allowed to confirm at the time. He also revealed that he had already recorded several new tracks, stating "I've been in the studio in Perth recording some singles, quite a few different tracks so we can get the right one out there for my first release. The songs are very much my style, which is pop, R&B, mainstream sort of stuff". In December 2011, he told Take 40 Australia that he had recorded a duet with his X Factor mentor Guy Sebastian. On 16 December 2011, he co-hosted the radio program Nova's Fresh Hits with Daniel "Gawndy" Gawned on Nova FM. On 20 December 2011, he performed at the Melbourne State Library as part of the Optus Celebrity Carols initiative to raise money for World Vision Australia.

In January 2012, he announced that he was working on his debut album in New York City. He was a supporting act for Reece Mastin's first headlining national tour in Adelaide on 28, 29 and 31 January. In March 2012, it was revealed that the record label he had signed with was Sony Music Australia. The following month, he became a celebrity contestant on the twelfth season of Dancing with the Stars and was partnered with professional dancer Luda Kroitor. Later that month, he was a supporting act for One Direction's Australian leg of their Up All Night Tour. On 18 April 2012, he was announced as the runner-up of Cleo magazine's 2012 Bachelor of the Year contest. In May 2012, he was a supporting act for New Kids on the Block and Backstreet Boys' Australian leg of their NKOTBSB Tour.

His debut single "On Top" was released on 15 June 2012. The song peaked at number 14 on the ARIA Singles Chart and was certified platinum by the Australian Recording Industry Association (ARIA), denoting shipments of 70,000 copies. Ruffo was announced as the winner of Dancing with the Stars on 17 June 2012. His winnings from the show were donated to the Youth Off The Streets charity. In September 2012, he joined the live shows of the fourth season of The X Factor as the host of the digital live streaming show, The X Stream. His second single "Take It Home" was released on 19 October 2012, and reached number 30 on the ARIA Singles Chart.

In April 2013, he made his acting debut in the Australian television soap opera Home and Away as Chris Harrington. He was initially contracted to appear in 16 episodes, but this was later extended. His third single "Untouchable" was released on 12 July 2013, and debuted at number 39 on the ARIA Singles Chart.

=== 2015–2016: Independent Artist: "She Got That O" and "White Christmas" ===
In May 2015, he released his fourth single "She Got That O". It was released independently, but failed to chart. On 11 December 2015, he released a Christmas single, a cover of "White Christmas". On 27 April 2016, Channel 7 announced that Ruffo had left Home and Away to pursue new challenges. He stated, "I've loved my time in Summer Bay. There's a lot more coming up for Chris and I hope fans continue enjoying his time on screen." His final episode of Home and Away screened on 22 September 2016. On 10 May 2016, it was announced that he would be featuring in the Channel Nine miniseries, House of Bond, about former WA businessman Alan Bond, to be filmed in Perth and Sydney. House of Bond aired on 24 and 25 April 2017.

=== 2017–2023: Brain tumour, "Broken Glass", and "Let's Get Lost" ===
On 10 August 2017, Ruffo announced that he had undergone surgery to remove a brain tumour, which was discovered after he went to the hospital suffering from a migraine. He posted post-surgery photos on his social media accounts asking fans to "keep him in their thoughts". A week later, he confirmed that he had been diagnosed with brain cancer and would begin aggressive treatment as soon as possible.

During a radio interview in May 2019, he told radio hosts Fitzy & Wippa that he was "currently clear of cancer". In June 2019, he released his first new single in four years titled, "Broken Glass". Ruffo told Channel 7: "This song is probably the most vulnerable song I've written. It's very personal for me. It's loosely about my experiences in the past two or three years – and about being down and out – not necessarily about cancer, but about anything like depression or losing a loved one." In 2020, he had a small recurring role in Neighbours as prison guard Owen Campbell.

In November 2020, Ruffo announced that his brain cancer had returned. In June 2021, he confirmed his cancer was "now stable". He released a single "Let's Get Lost", which he told The Morning Show was inspired by wanting to "pack up the car and get lost, just get away from everything for a while... the whole rigmarole of medication and chemotherapy, the stress of all of that." In August 2022, he released his memoir, entitled No Finish Line.

== Personal life, illness, and death ==
Ruffo was first diagnosed with brain cancer in 2017 and after treatment it went into remission. In 2020, he announced on his social media pages that his cancer had returned.

In August 2022, Ruffo revealed that his cancer was terminal and in the following month in September, he said that he wanted to live until Christmas. He died on 10 November 2023, at the age of 35.

== Influences ==
Ruffo cited Michael Jackson, Usher, and Justin Timberlake as his musical influences because they led him to combine his love for singing and dancing.

== Tours ==
Supporting act

- Reece Mastin's Australian Tour (2012)
- One Direction's Up All Night Tour: Australian leg (2012)
- New Kids on the Block and Backstreet Boys' NKOTBSB Tour: Australian leg (2012)

== Discography ==
=== Singles ===
List of singles, with selected chart positions and certifications
Title	Year	Peak chart position	Certifications
Title	Year	AUS	Certifications
"On Top"	2012	14	ARIA: Platinum
"Take It Home"	2012	30	ARIA: Gold
"Untouchable"	2013	39	
"She Got That O"	2015	—	
"White Christmas"	2015	—	
"Broken Glass"	2019	— (Note: "Broken Glass" did not enter the ARIA Top 100 Singles Chart, but peaked at number 5 on the Australian Independent Singles Chart in the week following his death.)	
"Let's Get Lost"	2021	— (Note: "Let's Get Lost" did not enter the ARIA Top 100 Singles Chart, but peaked at number 8 on the Australian Independent Singles Chart in the week following his death.)	

== Notes ==
=== Album appearances ===
List of album appearances
Title	Year	Album
"Santa Claus Is Coming to Town"	2012	The Spirit of Christmas 2012

=== Music videos ===
List of music videos
Title	Year	Director(s)
"On Top"	2012	
"Take It Home"	2012	
"Untouchable"	2013	
"She Got That O"	2015	
"Broken Glass"	2019	Michael Tan

== Filmography ==
Television
Year	Title	Role	Notes	Ref
2011	The X Factor	Himself; contestant	Season 3	
2012	Better Homes and Gardens	Himself; guest	1 episode	
2012	The Price Is Right	Himself; celebrity contestant	1 episode	
2012	Dancing with the Stars	Himself; celebrity contestant	Season 12	
2012	The X Stream	Himself; host		
2013–2016	Home and Away	Chris Harrington	Regular role; Seasons 26–29	
2013	Slide Show	Himself; celebrity contestant	1 episode	
2014	Beauty and the Geek Australia	Himself; guest	Season 6, episode 7	
2015	Better Homes and Gardens	Himself; guest	1 episode	
2017	Studio 10	Himself: guest	1 episode	
2017	House of Bond	Dave King	2 episodes	
2020	Neighbours	Owen Campbell	6 episodes	

== Awards and nominations ==
Year	Type	Award	Result
2013	Poprepublic.tv Awards	Favourite Australian Male Artist	Nominated
2014	Logie Awards	Most Popular New Talent (Home and Away)	Nominated
