= Live Louder =

Single by Nathaniel Willemse

from the album Yours
- Released: 5 September 2014
- Recorded: 2014
- Genre: Disco, funk
- Length: 3:09
- Label: DNA Songs, Sony
- Songwriter(s): David Ryan Harris; Nathaniel Willemse; Anthony Egizii; David Musumeci
- Producer(s): David Ryan Harris and DNA Songs

Nathaniel Willemse singles chronology
"You're Beautiful" (2014)	"Live Louder" (2014)	"Flava" (2015)

"Live Louder" is a song recorded by Australian singer-songwriter Nathaniel Willemse. It was released on 5 September 2014 as the third single from his debut studio album Yours.

== Background ==
A 90-second preview of "Live Louder" was released on 20 August 2014 via Willemse's VEVO account.

It became available for pre-order from 22 August 2014.

== Promotion ==
"Live Louder" received significant promotion due to its use in a television commercial promotion for the 14th season of Dancing with the Stars Australia. Willemse performed the song live on the verdict show for the sixth season of The X Factor Australia on 15 September 2014. "Live Louder" has since been sampled as the closing song in the first episode of the Disney Channel original Raven's Home, a spin off of the 2000s comedy That's So Raven starring Raven Symone. The song also features on the soundtrack of the 2015 Australian film "Sucker", which stars Timothy Spall, Shaun Micallef and Kat Stewart.

== Music video ==
The official video clip was released on 4 September 2014 via Willemse's VEVO account. Some of the scenes in the video clip bears a resemblance to "Need You Tonight" by INXS.

== Track listing ==
- Digital download
1. "Live Louder" – 3:09
- Remixes
1. "Live Louder" (7th Heaven Remix) – 3:19
2. "Live Louder" (7th Heaven Club Mix) – 5:58
3. "Live Louder" (David Konsky Remix) – 3:22

== Charts ==
"Live Louder" debuted at number 22 on the Australian ARIA Singles Chart and peaked at number 4 two weeks later.

=== Weekly charts ===
Chart (2014)	Peak position
Australia (ARIA)	4
Australian Artist Singles (ARIA)	2

=== Year-end charts ===
Chart (2014)	Position
Australia (ARIA)	66
Australian Artist Singles (ARIA)	12

== Certifications ==
Region	Certification	Certified units/sales
Australia (ARIA)	2× Platinum	140,000^{^}
^{^} Shipments figures based on certification alone.
