= You (Nathaniel Willemse song) =

Single by Nathaniel

from the album Yours
- B-side: "I Got a Feeling"
- Released: 27 September 2013
- Recorded: 2013
- Genre: Pop; R&B
- Length: 3:22
- Label: DNA Songs / Sony
- Songwriters: Nathaniel; Anthony Egizii; David Musumeci
- Producer: DNA Songs

Nathaniel singles chronology
"You Are the One" (2011)	"You" (2013)	"I Am Australian" (2014)

"You" is a song recorded by the Australian singer Nathaniel. The song was digitally released through DNA Songs / Sony on 27 September 2013, as his debut single with a major label. "You" peaked at number four on the ARIA Singles Chart and it was certified two times platinum by the Australian Recording Industry Association for selling 140,000 copies. The accompanying music video was released on 8 October 2013.

== Background and production ==
"You" was written by Nathaniel along with Anthony Egizii and David Musumeci from DNA Songs. Egizii and Musumeci also produced the track.

== Reception ==
A writer for Take 40 Australia said "'You' is a mixture of Prince and Miguel." He also praised Nathaniel because he is able to hit the high notes live. "You" debuted at number nine on the ARIA Singles Chart dated 7 October and peaked at number four the following week. "You" became Nathaniel's first top-five single. In its fourteenth week, "You" was certified two times platinum by the Australian Recording Industry Association for selling 140,000 copies.

== Promotion ==
The official video was released on 8 October 2013. It so far has over 1,326,000 views on VEVO. Nathaniel performed "You" during the fifth season of The X Factor Australia on 7 October. He then performed "You" as a special guest on the thirteenth season of Dancing With The Stars Australia on 3 November 2013.

== Track listing ==
- Digital download
1. "You" – 3:22
- CD single
1. "You"
2. "I Got a Feeling"

== Credits and personnel ==
Personnel

- Songwriting and production – Anthony Egizii and David Musumeci

== Charts ==
=== Weekly charts ===
Chart (2013)	Peak position
Australia (ARIA)	4
New Zealand (Recorded Music NZ)	16

=== Year-end charts ===
Chart (2013)	Position
ARIA Singles Chart	66
Australian Artist Singles Chart	8

== Certifications ==
Region	Certification	Certified units/sales
Australia (ARIA)	2× Platinum	140,000^{^}
^{^} Shipments figures based on certification alone.

== Release history ==
Country	Date	Format	Label	Catalogue
Australia	27 September 2013	Digital download	DNA Songs / Sony Music Australia	—N/a
New Zealand	27 September 2013	Digital download	DNA Songs / Sony Music Australia	—N/a
Australia	4 October 2013	CD	DNA Songs / Sony Music Australia	88883790482
