= Heart Hypnotic =

Single by Delta Goodrem
- Released: 17 June 2013
- Studio: Trackdown Studios, Sydney, Australia
- Genre: Pop; dance-pop
- Length: 3:25 (album version); 3:59 (US radio edit)
- Label: Sony Music
- Songwriters: Delta Goodrem; Ryan Tedder; Noel Zancanella; Justin Franks; Parker Ighile; Vince Pizzinga
- Producers: DJ Frank E; Ryan Tedder; Noel Zancanella

Delta Goodrem singles chronology
"Bayini" (2013)	"Heart Hypnotic" (2013)	"Love... Thy Will Be Done" (2014)

Audio video
- "Heart Hypnotic" on YouTube

"Heart Hypnotic" is a song by the Australian singer Delta Goodrem. It peaked at number seven on the ARIA Singles Chart and was certified gold by the Australian Recording Industry Association for selling 35,000 copies. The track was promoted by a performance at the grand finale of the second season of The Voice Australia.

== Background ==
"Heart Hynotic" was digitally released on 17 June 2013. It was written by Goodrem, Ryan Tedder, Noel Zancanella, Justin Franks, Parker Ighile and Vince Pizzinga, and was produced by Tedder, who has also produced tracks for Jennifer Lopez, Beyoncé and Kelly Clarkson. Tedder was also a celebrity mentor during the second season of The Voice Australia for Goodrem's team. The song was recorded at Trackdown Studios in Sydney, Australia.

Speaking of the song Tedder said, "That song was difficult for both of us - we were out of our comfort zones. But I like doing things that don't make sense if you can get away with it. The key is figuring out a new approach. For a decade Delta's had this shockingly large career in Australia. But if you lived in the same house for 10 years one day you walk in and go, that's it, I'm painting all the walls, the furniture, burning the rugs. I like the foundation, let's renovate. That's the frame of mind she's in." Goodrem has said that the song is about music itself. "Heart Hypnotic is about loving music. It's about, 'I don't know what this is, I don't know what this melody is, but I know I love it, I'm hypnotised by the beat.' There wasn't another layer, and that's unusual for me. ...It's more just [about] celebrating new music and a new phase of feeling very free in music - and me sharing my fun side a lot more."

== Reception ==
"Heart Hypnotic" received positive reviews from critics. A writer for Take 40 Australia wrote that "the new song marks a different direction for the songstress, with the track featuring an up-beat dance sound". Adam Bub from Ninemsn's TheFix viewed "Heart Hypnotic" as a "dance anthem" and added that it could finally be a hit in the United States. Upon its release, the song debuted at number seven on the ARIA Singles Chart with sales of 14,952 copies. "Heart Hypnotic" was certified gold by the Australian Recording Industry Association for selling 35,000 copies.

== Promotion ==
Goodrem appeared live on several radio programmes and stations around Australia, including The Fifi and Jules Show, Dan and Maz, Smallzy and Kyle and Jackie O. She performed the song live on the grand finale of the second season of The Voice Australia.

== Track listing ==
Digital download

1. "Heart Hypnotic" – 3:25

== Charts ==
Chart (2013)	Peak position
Australia (ARIA)	7

== Certification ==
Region	Certification	Certified units/sales
Australia (ARIA)	Gold	35,000^{^}
^{^} Shipments figures based on certification alone.

== Release history ==
Country	Date	Format	Label
Australia	17 June 2013	Digital download	Sony Music Australia
Austria	17 June 2013	Digital download	Sony Music Australia
Belgium	17 June 2013	Digital download	Sony Music Australia
Denmark	17 June 2013	Digital download	Sony Music Australia
Finland	17 June 2013	Digital download	Sony Music Australia
France	17 June 2013	Digital download	Sony Music Australia
Ireland	17 June 2013	Digital download	Sony Music Australia
Italy	17 June 2013	Digital download	Sony Music Australia
Netherlands	17 June 2013	Digital download	Sony Music Australia
New Zealand	17 June 2013	Digital download	Sony Music Australia
Norway	17 June 2013	Digital download	Sony Music Australia
Portugal	17 June 2013	Digital download	Sony Music Australia
Spain	17 June 2013	Digital download	Sony Music Australia
Sweden	17 June 2013	Digital download	Sony Music Australia
Switzerland	17 June 2013	Digital download	Sony Music Australia
United Kingdom	17 June 2013	Digital download	Sony Music Australia
Canada	6 August 2013	Digital download	Mercury Records
United States	6 August 2013	Digital download	Mercury Records
