= Hayley Sanderson =

British singer

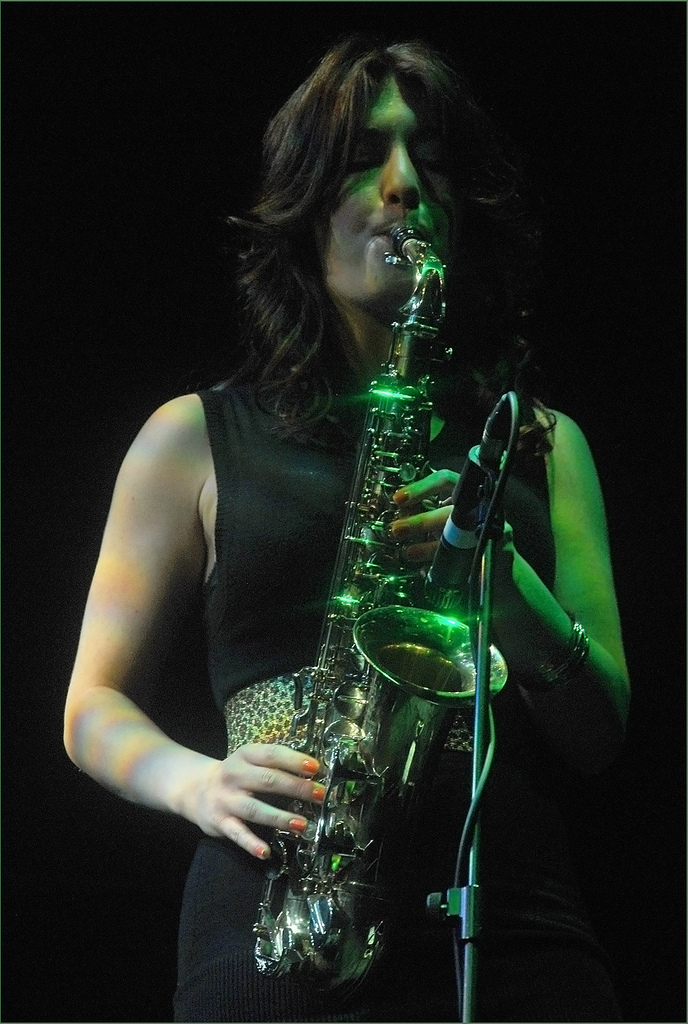
- Sanderson performing in 2009
- Born: 1982 (age 43–44); Peterborough, England
- Occupations: Singer, musician
- Known for: On Strictly and Rick Wakeman recordings

Hayley Sanderson (born 1982) is an English singer, songwriter and saxophonist. She is one of the vocalists on the BBC's Strictly Come Dancing and a musician on recordings by Rick Wakeman.

== Career ==
Born in Peterborough, England, Sanderson became known for her 2006 single, a cover of "Something in the Air" by Thunderclap Newman. The song was used by TalkTalk in its television advertisements. Members of the advertising agency discovered Sanderson at a performance in Ronnie Scott's jazz club, where she performed regularly with the Leo Green Experience. "Something in the Air" was re-recorded at Abbey Road Studios, with a 35-member string section. It was released on iTunes on 31 July 2006, with its store release on 7 August, and reached No. 61 on the UK Singles Chart. Proceeds from the song were donated to TreeHouse.

In October 2009, Sanderson released her debut album, Just Songs, a collection of covers and original material.

Sanderson is one of the vocalists on the UK edition of Strictly Come Dancing, and she has appeared with Tommy Blaize singing live on Strictly's sister show It Takes Two. She performs vocals and saxophone with Kitsch Lounge Riot and the Pink Floyd tribute band, Think Floyd. In 2011, she featured on "Here's Why", a duet with Gilbert O'Sullivan on his album Gilbertville.

In 2014, Sanderson joined Rick Wakeman as vocalist on his UK tour of Journey to the Centre of the Earth to celebrate its fortieth anniversary. She sings on the 2012 re-recording of the album, as well as the 2016 re-recording of Wakeman's The Myths and Legends of King Arthur and the Knights of the Round Table.

Sanderson writes songs including the song "Stars" which she co-wrote with Ian Masterson.

In 2020, she was using her Strictly profile to help raise money for domestic abuse charities.
