= Jessica Mauboy discography =

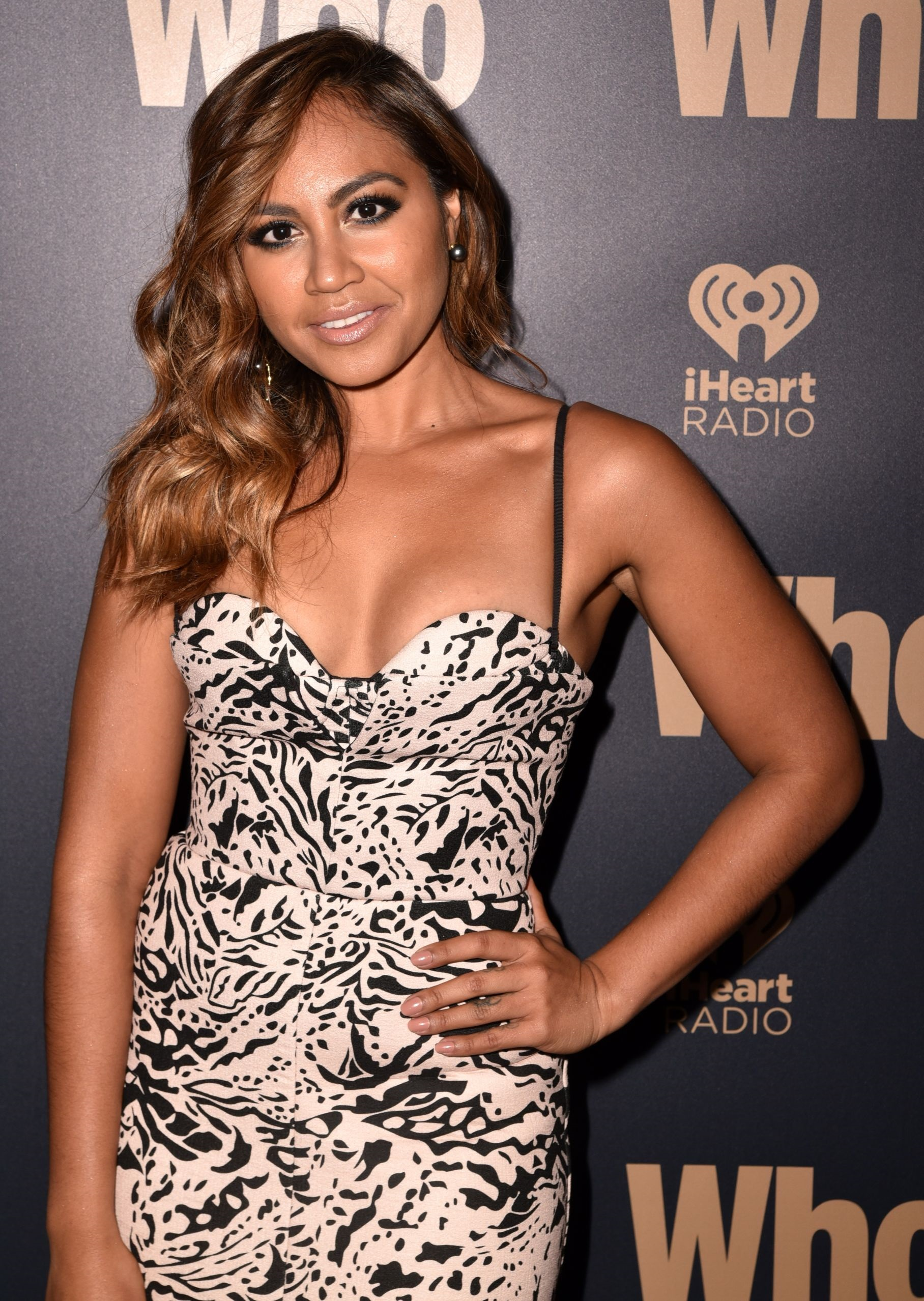
- Jessica Mauboy at Who Magazine's Sexiest People Party in October 2014
- Studio albums: 5
- Extended plays: 2
- Soundtrack albums: 3
- Live albums: 1
- Singles: 45

Australian singer and songwriter Jessica Mauboy has released five studio albums, one live album, three soundtrack albums (including two individual soundtracks), two extended plays, and forty-five singles (including four as featured artist). Mauboy was the runner-up on the fourth season of Australian Idol in 2006, and subsequently signed a contract with Sony Music Australia. She released her debut live album The Journey in February 2007, which features songs she performed as part of the top twelve on Australian Idol. The album debuted at number four on the ARIA Albums Chart and was certified gold by the Australian Recording Industry Association (ARIA), denoting shipments of 35,000 copies. Mauboy briefly became a member of the Australian pop girl group Young Divas later that year, before resuming her solo career early in 2008.

Mauboy released her debut studio album Been Waiting in November 2008, which peaked at number eleven on the ARIA Albums Chart and spent fifty-nine weeks in the top fifty. The album was certified double platinum, denoting shipments of 140,000 copies, and became the second highest-selling Australian album of 2009. The album was preceded by the lead single "Running Back", which features American rapper Flo Rida. The song peaked at number three on the ARIA Singles Chart and was certified double platinum. The second single "Burn" became Mauboy's first number-one song on the chart and was certified platinum. It also became Mauboy's first charting single internationally, reaching number 92 on the Japan Hot 100. Been Waiting also yielded three other successful singles which were certified gold, the title track "Been Waiting", "Because" and "Up/Down".

Mauboy's second studio album Get 'Em Girls was released in November 2010, which debuted at number six and was certified gold. As a result, the album was less commercially successful compared to its predecessor. The album's title track "Get 'Em Girls" which features American rapper Snoop Dogg, was released as the lead single and peaked at number nineteen. Subsequent singles "Saturday Night" and "Inescapable" both peaked within the top ten and received double platinum certifications. "Galaxy", the final single from Get 'Em Girls, features Australian recording artist Stan Walker. It became Mauboy's first song to chart in New Zealand, where it reached the top forty and was certified gold by the Recording Industry Association of New Zealand (RIANZ). To promote the film The Sapphires (2012), in which Mauboy portrays the character of Julie McCrae, she released "Gotcha" as the lead single from the soundtrack of the same name. The song peaked at number forty-three on the ARIA Singles Chart.

Mauboy's third studio album Beautiful was released in October 2013, which debuted at number three and was certified platinum. The album was preceded by the lead single "To the End of the Earth", which peaked at number twenty-one and was certified gold. The following singles "Pop a Bottle (Fill Me Up)", "Never Be the Same" and "Can I Get a Moment?" all peaked within the top ten.

Mauboy's fifth studio album Yours Forever was released in February 2024. It is her first on Warner Music Australia and was her eighth to peak into the ARIA top 10.

In 2025 Mauboy announced the launch of independent label Jamally, and released her first independent song "While I Got Time" on 1 August 2025.

== Albums ==
=== Studio albums ===
List of studio albums, with selected chart positions and certifications
Title	Album details	Peak chart positions		Certifications
Title	Album details	AUS	JPN	Certifications
Been Waiting	Released: 17 November 2008 (Australia); Label: Sony Music Australia; Formats: CD, digital download	11	138	ARIA: 2× Platinum
Get 'Em Girls	Released: 5 November 2010 (Australia); Label: Sony Music Australia; Formats: CD, digital download	6	—	ARIA: Platinum
Beautiful	Released: 4 October 2013 (Australia); Label: Sony Music Australia; Formats: CD, digital download	3	—	ARIA: Platinum
Hilda	Released: 18 October 2019 (Australia); Label: Sony Music Australia; Formats: CD, digital download, streaming	1	—	
Yours Forever	Released: 9 February 2024; Label: Warner Music Australia; Formats: CD, LP, digital download, streaming	10	—	
"—" denotes items which were not released in that country or did not chart.

=== Live albums ===
List of live albums, with selected chart positions and certifications
Title	Album details	Peak chart positions	Certifications
Title	Album details	AUS	Certifications
The Journey	Released: 24 February 2007 (Australia); Label: Sony Music Australia; Formats: CD, digital download	4	ARIA: Gold

=== Soundtrack albums ===
List of soundtrack albums, with selected chart positions and certifications
Title	Album details	Peak chart positions	Certifications
Title	Album details	AUS	Certifications
The Sapphires: Original Motion Picture Soundtrack	Released: 27 July 2012 (Australia); Label: Sony Music Australia; Formats: CD, digital download	1	ARIA: 2× Platinum
The Secret Daughter: Songs from the Original TV Series	Released: 14 October 2016 (Australia); Label: Sony Music Australia; Formats: CD, digital download	1	ARIA: Platinum
The Secret Daughter Season Two: Songs from the Original 7 Series	Released: 6 October 2017 (Australia); Label: Sony Music Australia; Formats: CD, digital download	2	ARIA: Gold

== Extended plays ==
List of extended plays, with selected chart positions
Title	Extended play details	Peak chart positions
Title	Extended play details	AUS
iTunes Session	Released: 18 July 2014 (Australia); Label: Sony Music Australia; Formats: Digital download	25
Yours Forever Tour Live	Released: 6 September 2024; Label: Jamally, Warner; Formats: Digital download	—

== Singles ==
=== As lead artist ===
List of singles, with selected chart positions and certifications
Title	Year	Peak chart positions						Certifications	Album
Title	Year	AUS	FRA	JPN	NZ	SCO	SWE	Certifications	Album
"Running Back" (featuring Flo Rida)	2008	3	—	—	—	—	—	ARIA: 2× Platinum	Been Waiting
"Burn"	2008	1	—	92	—	—	—	ARIA: Platinum	Been Waiting
"Been Waiting"	2009	12	—	—	—	—	—	ARIA: Gold	Been Waiting
"Because"	2009	9	—	—	—	—	—	ARIA: Gold	Been Waiting
"Up/Down"	2009	11	—	—	—	—	—	ARIA: Gold	Been Waiting
"Let Me Be Me"	2009	26	—	—	—	—	—		Been Waiting
"Everyone" (with Jody Williams, Sean Kingston, Tabitha Nauser and Steve Appleton)	2010	—	—	—	—	—	—		Non-album single
"Get 'Em Girls" (featuring Snoop Dogg)	2010	19	—	—	—	—	—		Get 'Em Girls
"Saturday Night" (featuring Ludacris)	2010	7	—	—	—	—	—	ARIA: 2× Platinum	Get 'Em Girls
"What Happened to Us" (featuring Jay Sean)	2011	14	—	—	—	—	—	ARIA: Platinum	Get 'Em Girls
"Inescapable"	2011	4	—	—	—	—	—	ARIA: 2× Platinum	Get 'Em Girls
"Galaxy" (featuring Stan Walker)	2011	13	—	—	36	—	—	ARIA: Platinum; RMNZ: Gold	Get 'Em Girls
"Gotcha"	2012	43	—	—	—	—	—	ARIA: Gold	The Sapphires
"Something's Got a Hold on Me" (Note: "Something's Got a Hold on Me" is a cover of the Etta James song, and was released as the theme song for the 2013 NRL season.)	2013	26	—	—	—	—	—		Non-album single
"To the End of the Earth"	2013	21	—	—	—	—	—	ARIA: Gold	Beautiful
"Pop a Bottle (Fill Me Up)"	2013	2	—	—	33	—	—	ARIA: Platinum	Beautiful
"Beautiful"	2013	46	—	—	—	—	—		Beautiful
"I Am Australian" (Note: "I Am Australian" is a cover that was released as part of Sydney's Australia Day celebrations.) (with Dami Im, Justice Crew, Nathaniel Willemse, Samantha Jade and Taylor Henderson)	2014	51	—	—	—	—	—		Non-album single
"Never Be the Same"	2014	6	—	—	—	—	—	ARIA: Platinum	Beautiful
"Sea of Flags"	2014	40	—	—	—	—	—		Non-album single
"Can I Get a Moment?"	2014	5	—	—	—	—	—	ARIA: Platinum	Beautiful (Platinum Edition)
"The Day Before I Met You"	2015	41	—	—	—	—	—		Beautiful (Platinum Edition)
"This Ain't Love"	2015	5	—	—	—	—	—	ARIA: Gold	Non-album singles
"Chains" (with Tina Arena and The Veronicas)	2015	14	—	—	—	—	—		Non-album singles
"Where I'll Stay"	2016	144	—	—	—	—	—		Non-album singles
"Risk It"	2016	—	—	—	—	—	—		The Secret Daughter: Songs from the Original TV Series
"Wake Me Up"	2016	34	—	—	—	—	—		The Secret Daughter: Songs from the Original TV Series
"Fallin'"	2017	11	—	—	—	—	—	ARIA: 2× Platinum; RMNZ: Gold	The Secret Daughter Season Two: Songs from the Original 7 Series
"Then I Met You"	2017	114	—	—	—	—	—		The Secret Daughter Season Two: Songs from the Original 7 Series
"We Got Love"	2018	31	148	—	—	60	86		Eurovision Song Contest: Lisbon 2018
"Sunday"	2019	—	—	—	— (Note: "Sunday" did not enter the NZ Top 40 Singles Chart, but peaked at number 33 on the NZ Hot Singles Chart.)	—	—		Hilda
"Little Things"	2019	25	—	—	— (Note: "Little Things" did not enter the NZ Top 40 Singles Chart, but peaked at number 38 on the NZ Hot Singles Chart.)	—	—	ARIA: 2× Platinum; RMNZ: Gold	Hilda
"Selfish"	2019	—	—	—	—	—	—		Hilda
"Butterfly"	2020	—	—	—	—	—	—		Hilda
"Glow"	2021	—	—	—	— (Note: "Glow" did not enter the NZ Top 40 Singles Chart, but peaked at number 40 on the NZ Hot Singles Chart.)	—	—		Non-album singles
"Automatic"	2022	—	—	—	—	—	—		Non-album singles
"Right Here, Right Now"	2023	—	—	—	—	—	—		Non-album singles
"Give You Love" (featuring Jason Derulo)	2023	74	—	—	— (Note: "Give You Love" did not enter the NZ Top 40 Singles Chart, but peaked at number 17 on the NZ Hot Singles Chart.)	—	—	ARIA: Gold	Yours Forever
"Flashback"	2023	—	—	—	—	—	—		Yours Forever
"Never Giving Up"	2023	—	—	—	—	—	—		Yours Forever
"Forget You"	2024	—	—	—	—	—	—		Yours Forever
"I'm Sorry"	2024	—	—	—	—	—	—		Yours Forever
"Higher"	2024	—	—	—	—	—	—		Non-album singles
"World Turning"(Like a Version) (with Barkaa)	2025	—	—	—	—	—	—		Non-album singles
"While I Got Time"	2025	—	—	—	—	—	—		TBA
"—" denotes items which were not released in that country or did not chart.

=== As featured artist ===
List of singles, with selected chart positions
Title	Year	Peak chart positions	Album
Title	Year	AUS	Album
"Spirit of the Anzacs" (Lee Kernaghan featuring Guy Sebastian, Sheppard, Jon Stevens, Jessica Mauboy, Shannon Noll and Megan Washington)	2015	32	Spirit of the Anzacs
"First Nation" (Midnight Oil featuring Jessica Mauboy and Tasman Keith)	2020	—	The Makarrata Project
"Heaven With U" (Tasman Keith featuring Jessica Mauboy)	2022	—	A Colour Undone
"Won't Stop" (3% featuring Jessica Mauboy)	2024	—	Kill the Dead
"Treat Me Good" (Bachelor Girl featuring Jessica Mauboy)	2026	—	Waiting for the Day: Artist Sessions
"In the Air Tonight" (Like a Version) (Onefour featuring Jimmy Barnes and Jessica Mauboy	2026	—	Non-album single
"For You" (Ruby Rodgers featuring Jessica Mauboy and Jem Cassar-Daley	2026	—	Sixteen

=== Promotional singles ===
List of promotional singles, with selected chart positions
Title	Year	Peak chart positions	Album
Title	Year	NZ Hot	Album
"Waltzing Matilda" (Note: "Waltzing Matilda" is a cover that was released to promote the 2012 Summer Olympics in Australia.) (with Stan Walker)	2012	—	Non-album promotional singles
"I Believe – Anything Is Possible" (Note: "I Believe – Anything Is Possible" was performed at the 2014 Commonwealth Games closing ceremony to promote the is 2018 Commonwealth Games in Australia.)	2014	—	Non-album promotional singles
"Diamonds"	2017	—	The Secret Daughter – The Secret Edition
"Just Like You"	2019	27	Hilda
"Blessing"	2019	37	Hilda

== Other appearances ==
List of other non-single song appearances
Title	Year	Album
"Time After Time"	2009	Bushfire Aid
"Have Yourself a Merry Little Christmas"	2009	The Spirit of Christmas 2009
"Miss You Most (At Christmas Time)"	2009	Stars of Christmas
"Love Me Tender" (Elvis Presley featuring Jessica Mauboy)	2010	Viva Elvis
"Send Me An Angel" and "The Bridge We've Been Waiting For"	2011	Underbelly Razor - Music From The Hit TV Show
"O Holy Night"	2011	The Spirit of Christmas 2011
"All I Want for Christmas Is You"	2011	All I Want: Stars of Christmas
"Over and Over"	2013	Dance Academy
"Sleigh Ride" (with Human Nature)	2013	The Christmas Album
"Saturday Night" (live)	2020	Artists Unite for Fire Fight
"Pig in a Pug" (with Aron Blabey)	2020	Big W Rap Books

== See also ==
- Jessica Mauboy videography
- List of songs recorded by Jessica Mauboy
