= List of songs recorded by Jessica Mauboy =

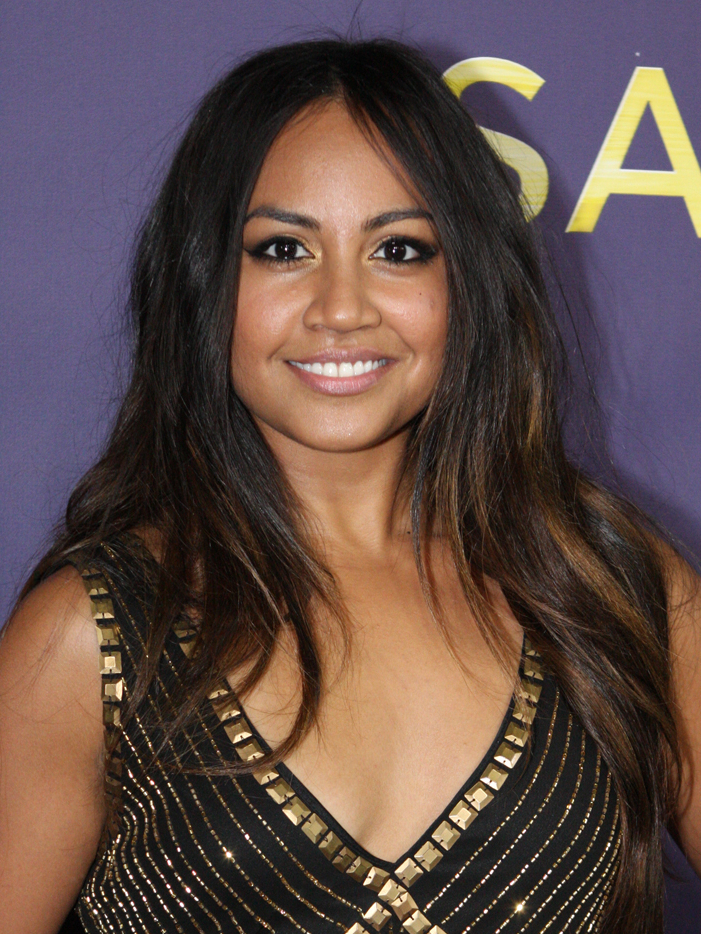
Mauboy at the Australian premiere of The Sapphires in 2012

Australian singer and songwriter Jessica Mauboy has recorded songs for a live album, three studio albums, non-album singles and an extended play, some of which were collaborations with other artists. After she became the runner-up on the fourth season of Australian Idol in 2006, Mauboy signed a contract with record label Sony Music Australia. The following year, she released her debut live album The Journey, which featured re-recorded covers of the selected songs she performed as part of the top twelve on Australian Idol. Mauboy's debut studio album Been Waiting was released in 2008. The lead single "Running Back", featuring Flo Rida, was written by Mauboy, Audius Mtawarira and Sean Ray Mullins. She also co-wrote the album's title track with Israel Cruz, while Jonas Jeberg and Mich "Cutfather" Hansen co-wrote the second single "Burn". Kwamé co-wrote and produced the fifth single "Up/Down". The sixth and final single "Let Me Be Me" was co-written by Sugababes member Jade Ewen. Been Waiting was re-released in 2009 and included several new songs written by Mauboy and Mtawarira, among others.

In 2010, Mauboy contributed guest vocals on the song "Love Me Tender" for Elvis Presley's soundtrack album, Viva Elvis. Her second studio album Get 'Em Girls was released in November 2010. In addition to working with Mtawarira and Cruz again, Mauboy collaborated with American songwriters and producers she had not worked with previously. The album's title track, featuring Snoop Dogg, was produced by Bangladesh, while the second single "Saturday Night" was co-written by Brian Kennedy and Ludacris, who also appears on the single as a featured artist. Cruz co-produced the third single "What Happened to Us", which features Jay Sean, while Harvey Mason, Jr. co-wrote the tracks "Fight for You" and "Here for Me". Get 'Em Girls was re-released in 2011 and featured the new single releases "Inescapable", which was written solely by Diane Warren, and "Galaxy".

Mauboy starred in the 2012 musical film The Sapphires and recorded fifteen songs for its accompanying soundtrack album. She co-wrote the soundtrack's lead single "Gotcha" with Ilan Kidron and Louis Schoorl. Mauboy also co-wrote ten of the thirteen songs on her third studio album Beautiful, which was released in 2013. She reunited with Kennedy on "Honest" and "Go (I Don't Need You)", while Pitbull co-wrote and appears as a featured artist on "Kick Up Your Heels". The album's fourth single "Never Be the Same" was written by Mauboy with Anthony Egizii and David Musumeci of the production team DNA. The Fliptones and The Underdogs also wrote and produced tracks for the album. Beautiful was re-released in 2014 and featured the new single releases "Can I Get a Moment?" and "The Day Before I Met You", both of which were co-written by Kenneth "Babyface" Edmonds. In July 2014, Mauboy released her first extended play iTunes Session, which contained a cover version of Frank Ocean's "Thinkin Bout You".

Note: Up to date as of 4 October 2020

== Songs ==
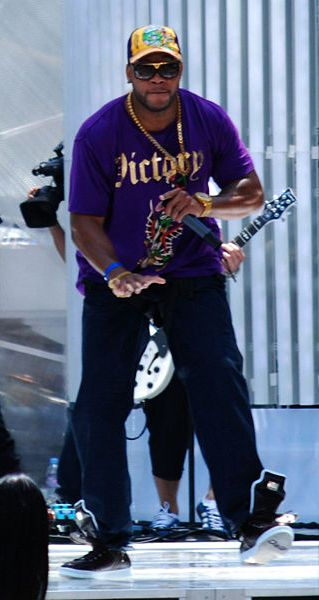
Flo Rida (pictured) appears as a featured artist on Mauboy's debut single "Running Back", which is included on her debut studio album Been Waiting (2008).

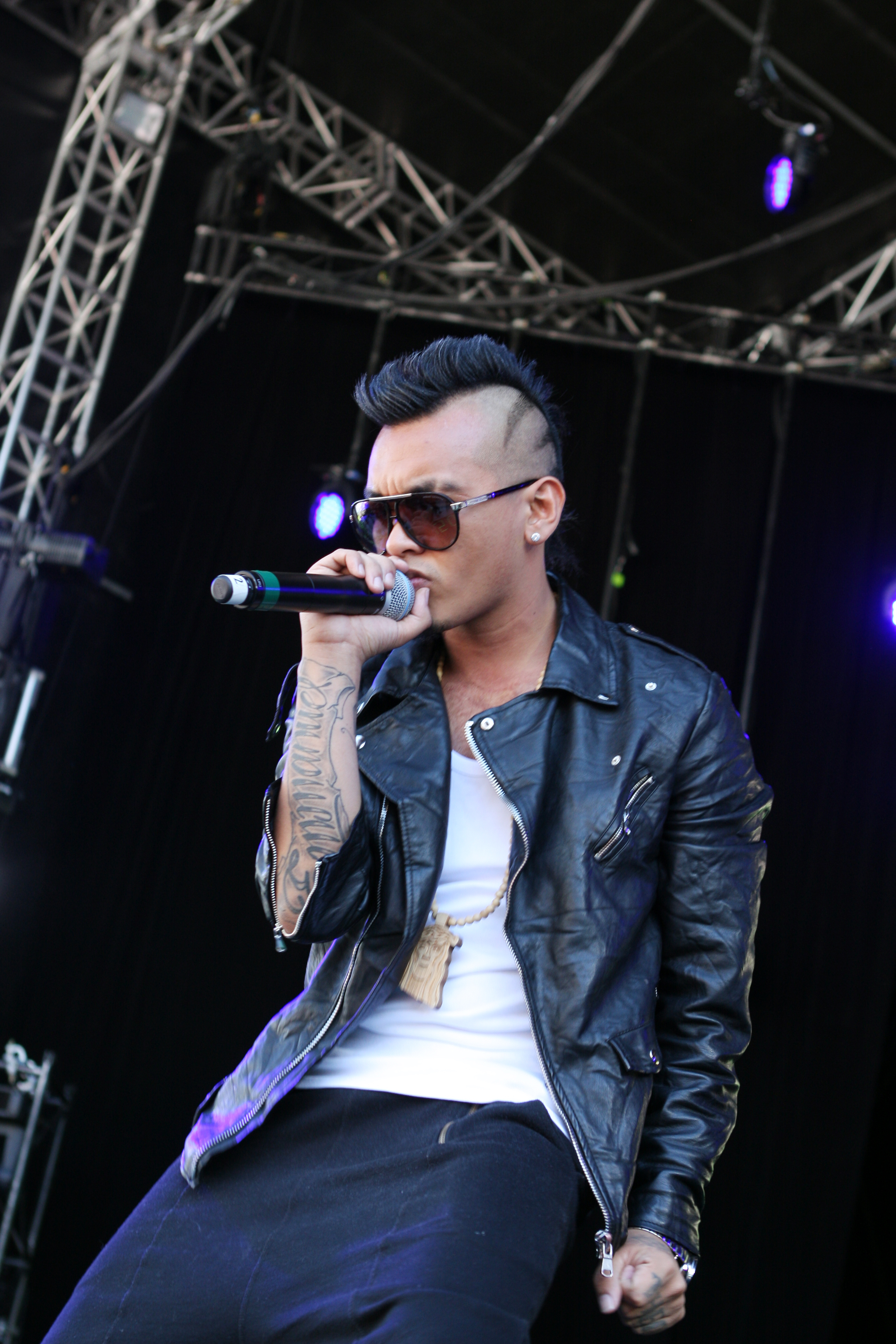
Israel Cruz (pictured) co-wrote the title track for Been Waiting (2008), and "What Happened to Us" for Mauboy's second studio album Get 'Em Girls (2010).

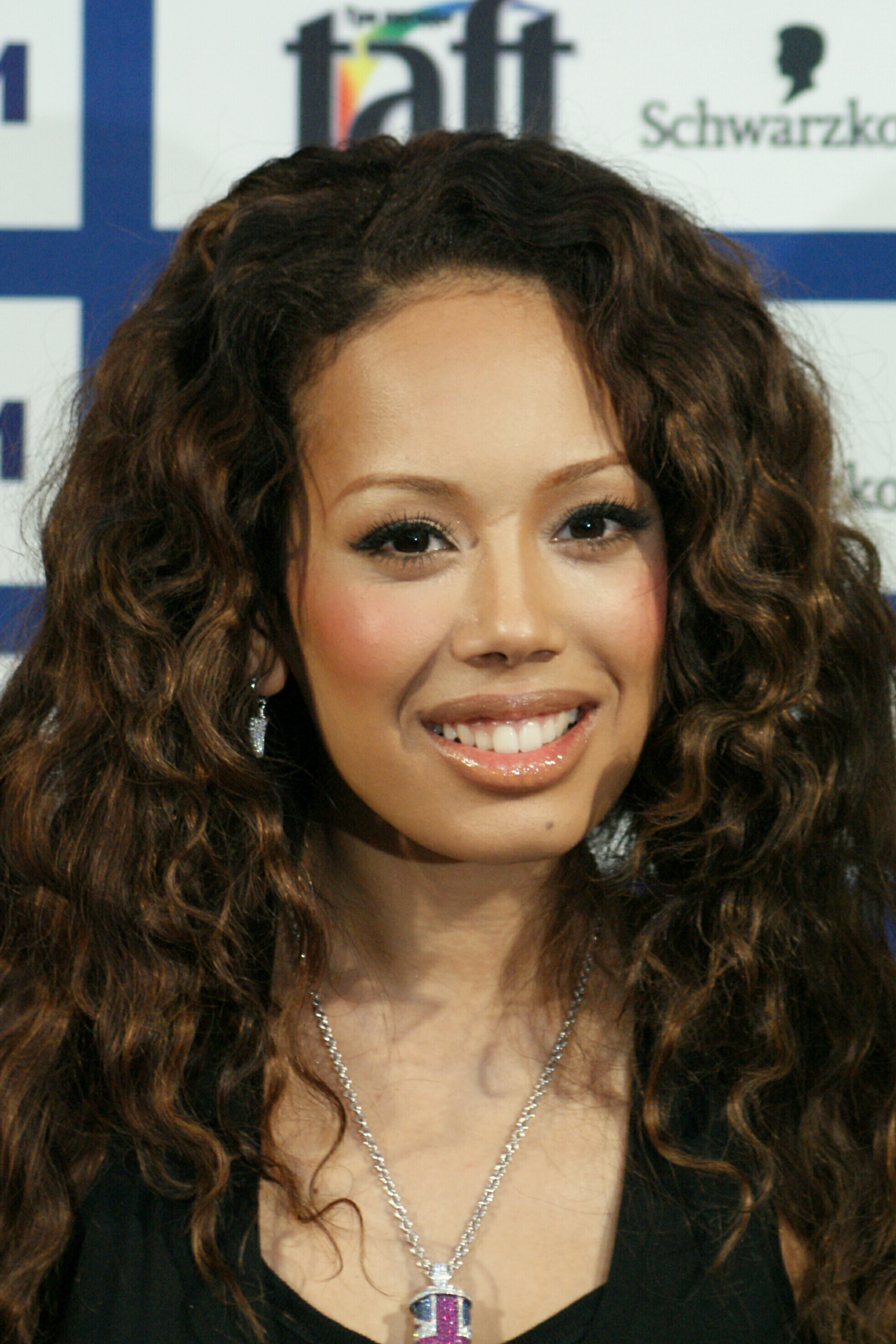
Jade Ewen (pictured) co-wrote the single "Let Me Be Me" for Been Waiting (2008).

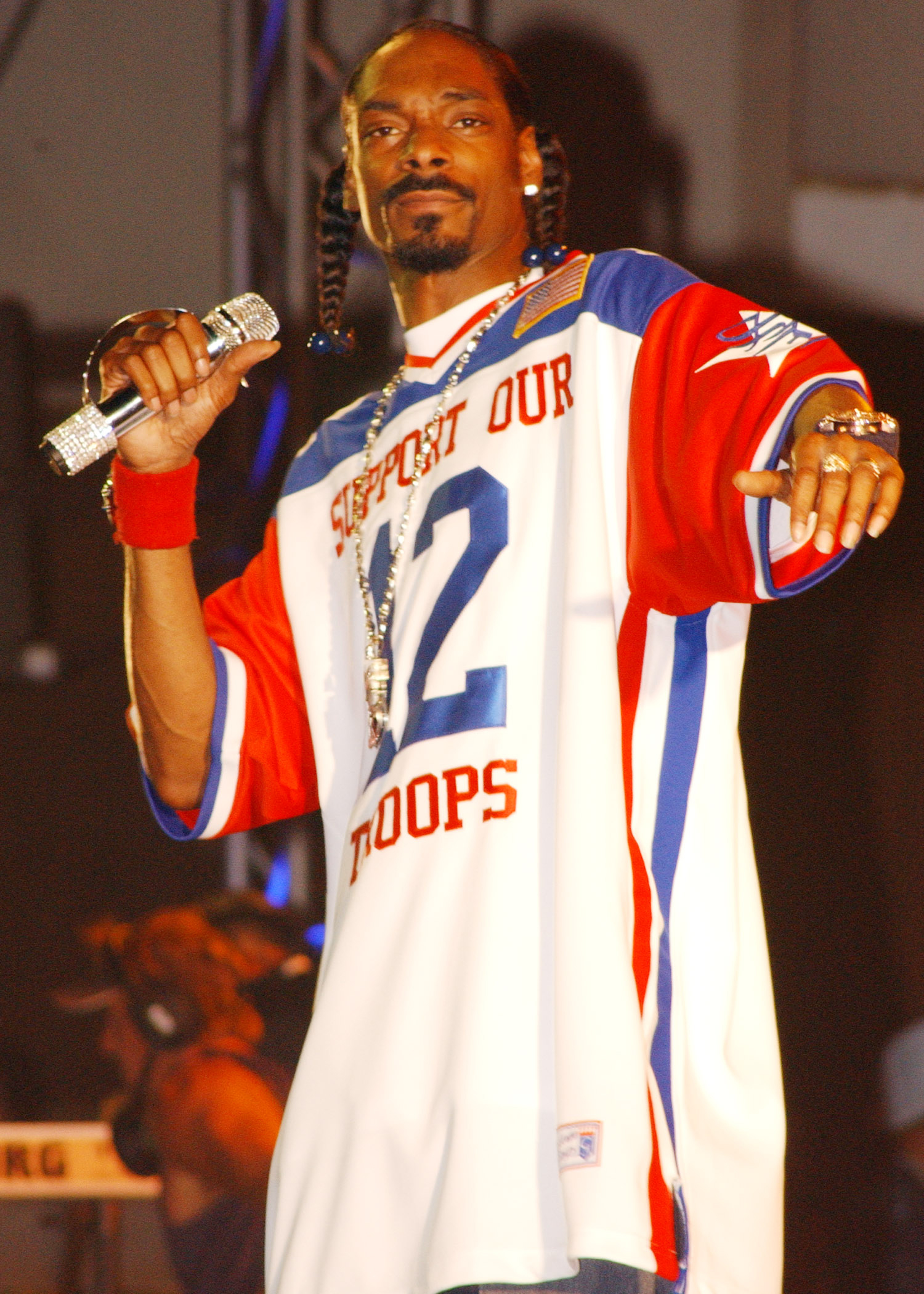
Snoop Dogg (pictured) co-wrote and appears as a featured artist on the title track for Get 'Em Girls (2010).

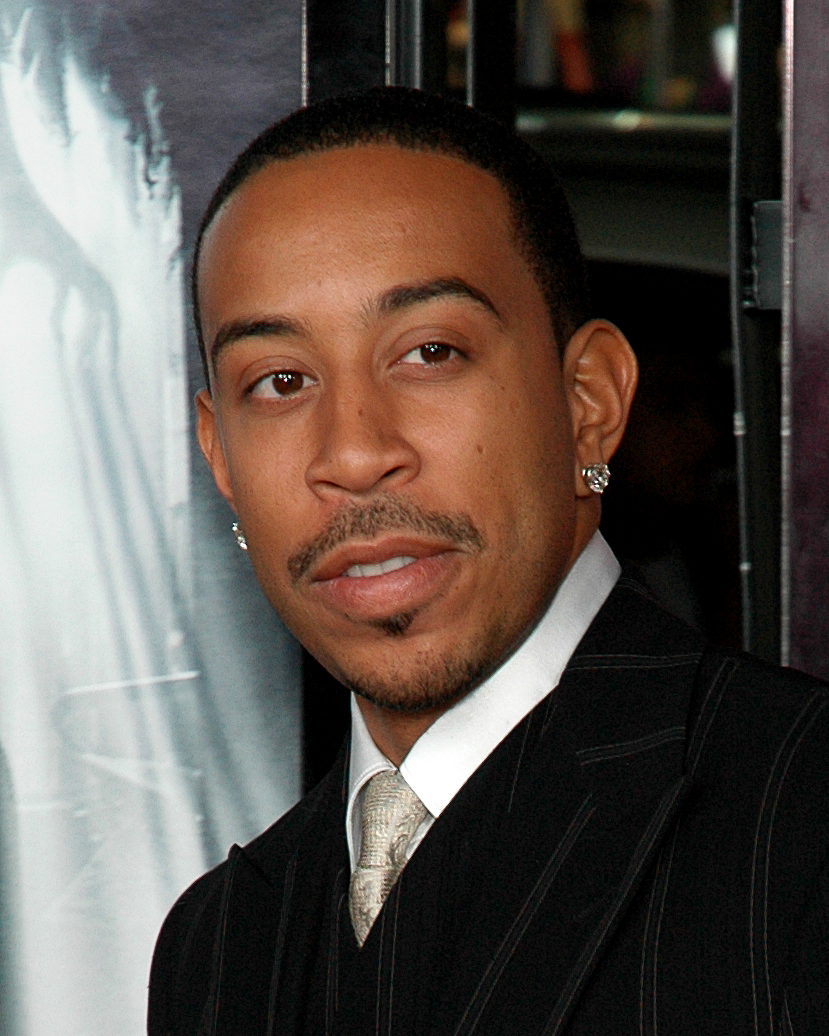
Ludacris (pictured) co-wrote and appears as a featured artist on the single "Saturday Night" for Get 'Em Girls (2010).

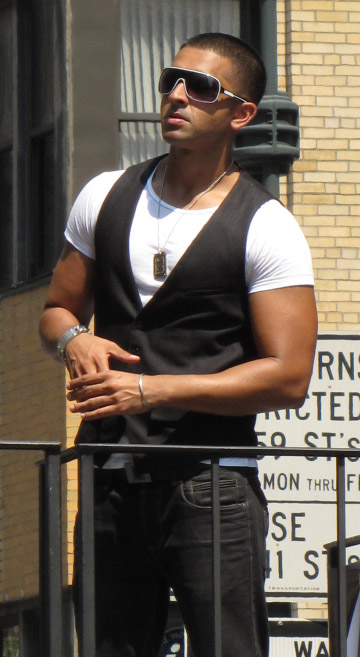
Jay Sean (pictured) co-wrote and appears as a featured artist on the single "What Happened to Us" for Get 'Em Girls (2010).

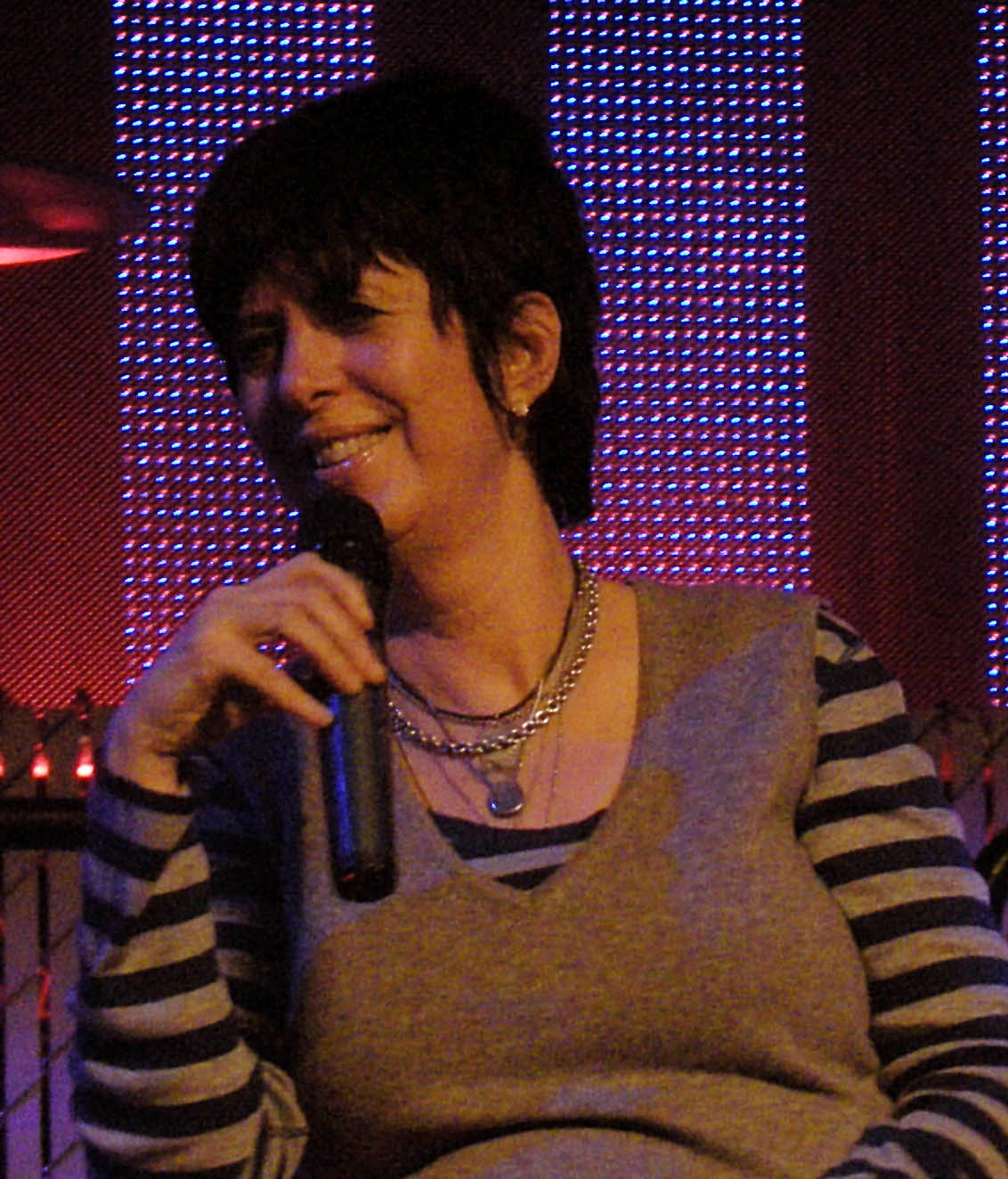
Diane Warren (pictured) wrote "Inescapable" for the re-release of Get 'Em Girls in 2011, and "Get Used to Me" for the soundtrack album The Sapphires (2012).

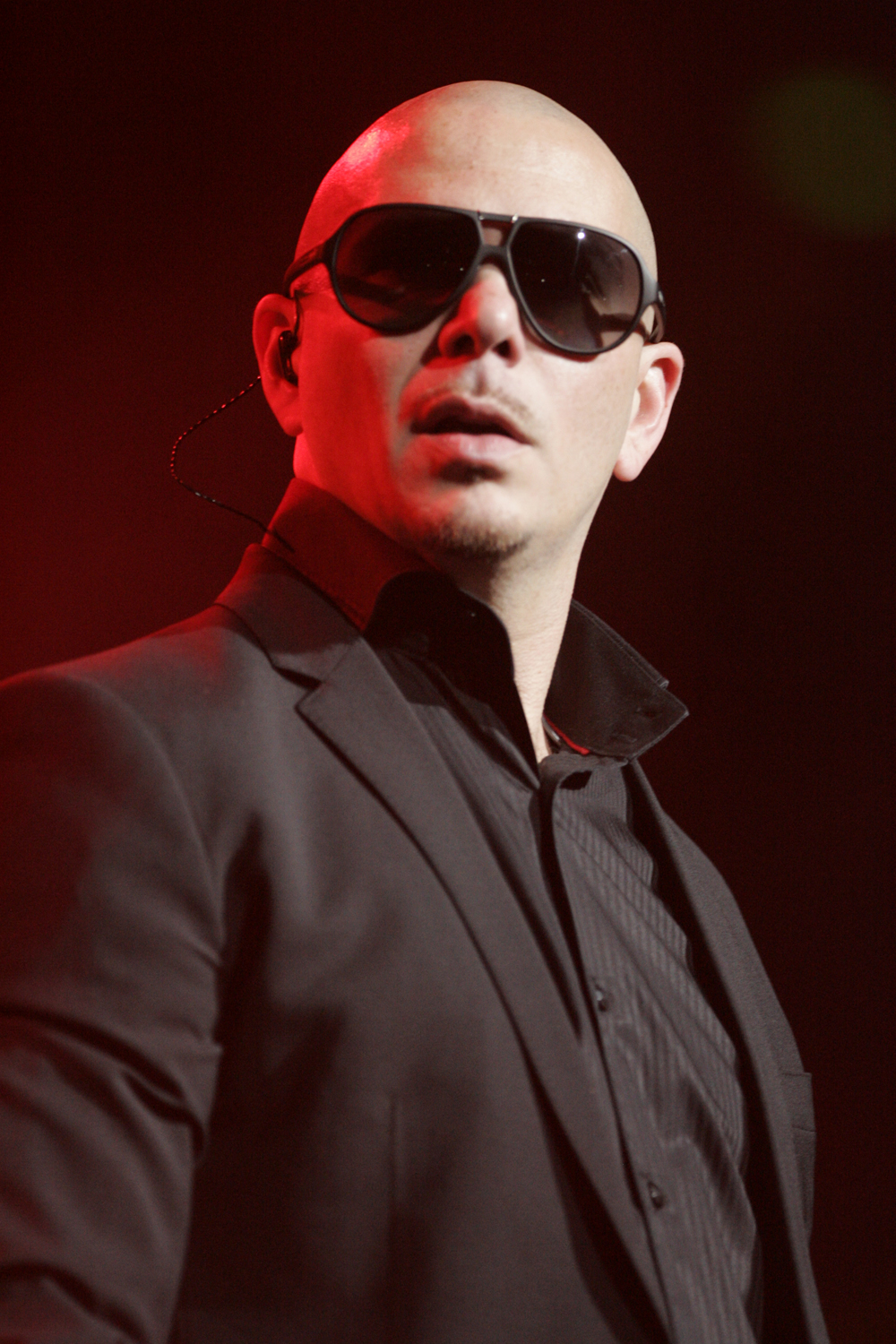
Pitbull (pictured) co-wrote and appears as a featured artist on the song "Kick Up Your Heels" for Mauboy's third studio album Beautiful (2013).

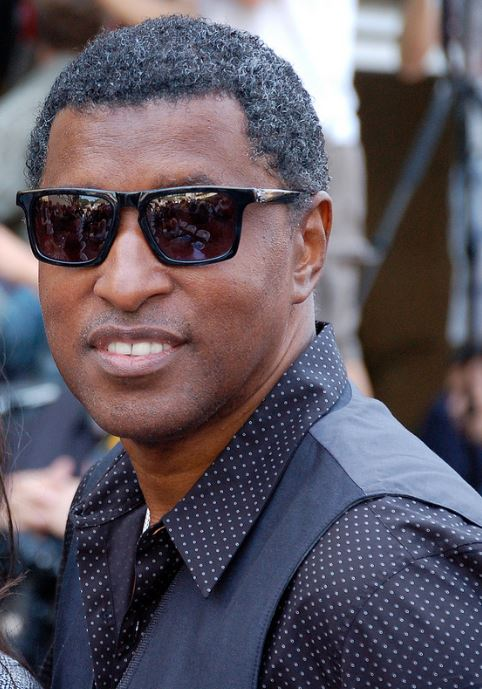
Kenneth "Babyface" Edmonds (pictured) co-wrote "Can I Get a Moment?" and "The Day Before I Met You" for the re-release of Beautiful in 2014.

Key
†	Indicates single release

Song	Artist(s)	Writer(s)	Album	Year	Ref.
"Accelerate That"	Jessica Mauboy	Dwayne Nesmith; Tyrrell Bing; Dominic Gordon; Shantee Tyler; Brandon Hesson	Get 'Em Girls	2010	
"All I Want for Christmas Is You"	Jessica Mauboy	Walter Afanasieff; Mariah Carey	All I Want for Christmas	2010	
"All Mine" (Note: Denotes songs which were included on the re-release of Beautiful in 2014.)	Jessica Mauboy	Jessica Mauboy; Par Westerlund; Cristi Vaughn	Beautiful	2014	
"All the Way Jesus"	Jessica Mauboy	Jimmy Chi; Stephen Pigram; Michael Manolis	Bran Nue Dae	2010	
"Always On My Mind"	Jessica Mauboy featuring Warren H. Williams	Wayne Carson; Johnny Christopher; Mark James	The Secret Daughter Season Two: Songs from the Original 7 Series	2017	
"Amazing"	Jessica Mauboy	Alex Lloyd	The Secret Daughter: Songs from the Original TV Series	2016	
"Amazing Grace"	Jessica Mauboy featuring Dr G Yunupingu	John Newton	The Secret Daughter Season Two: Songs from the Original 7 Series	2017	
"Another Day in Paradise"	Jessica Mauboy	Phillip Collins	The Journey	2007	
"Back2U"	Jessica Mauboy	Jessica Mauboy; Adam Reily; Brooke McClymont	Been Waiting	2008	
"Barriers"	Jessica Mauboy	Jessica Mauboy; Anthony Egizii; David Musumeci	Beautiful	2013	
"Beautiful"	Jessica Mauboy	Linda Perry	The Journey	2007	
"Beautiful" †	Jessica Mauboy	Jessica Mauboy; Charles Hinshaw; Chaz Mishan; David Delazyn	Beautiful	2013	
"Because" †	Jessica Mauboy	Jessica Mauboy; Dion Howell; Michael "Fingaz" Mugisha	Been Waiting	2008	
"Been Waiting" †	Jessica Mauboy	Jessica Mauboy; Israel Cruz; Craig Hardy	Been Waiting	2008	
"Better"	Jessica Mauboy		Hilda	2019	
"Better Be Home Soon"	Jessica Mauboy	Neil Finn	The Secret Daughter: Songs from the Original TV Series	2016	
"Big Girls Cry"	Jessica Mauboy	Sia Furler; Chris Braide	The Secret Daughter: Songs from the Original TV Series	2016	
"Blessing"	Jessica Mauboy		Hilda	2019	
"Break My Stride"	Jessica Mauboy	Matthew Wilder; Greg Prestopino	The Secret Daughter Season Two: Songs from the Original 7 Series	2017	
"Breathe" (Note: Denotes songs which were included on the re-release of Been Waiting in 2009.)	Jessica Mauboy	Jessica Mauboy; Michael "Fingaz" Mugisha; Dion Howell	Been Waiting	2009	
"Burn" †	Jessica Mauboy	Taj Jackson; Jonas Jeberg; Mich Hansen	Been Waiting	2008	
"Butterfly" †	Jessica Mauboy		Hilda	2019	
"Butterfly"	Jessica Mauboy	Mariah Carey; Walter Afanasieff	The Journey	2007	
"Can Anybody Tell Me"	Jessica Mauboy	H. Smith; Fredrik Odesjo; Andreas Levander	Get 'Em Girls	2010	
"Can I Get a Moment?" †	Jessica Mauboy	Antonio Dixon; Kenneth "Babyface" Edmonds; Khristopher Riddick-Tynes; Carmen Reece; Leon Thomas III; Helen Culver	Beautiful	2014	
"Chains" †	Jessica Mauboy with The Veronicas and Tina Arena	Steve Werfel; Pam Reswick; Tina Arena	—N/a	2015	
"Chinese Whispers"	Jessica Mauboy	Jessica Mauboy; Anthony Egizii; David Musumeci	Been Waiting	2008	
"Closer"	Jessica Mauboy	Birdsall; Schoorl	The Secret Daughter: Songs from the Original TV Series	2016	
"Come Running"	Jessica Mauboy		Hilda	2019	
"The Day Before I Met You" †	Jessica Mauboy	Antonio Dixon; Kenneth "Babyface" Edmonds; Khristopher Riddick-Tynes; Helen Culver; Jessica Mauboy	Beautiful	2014	
"Diamonds"†	Jessica Mauboy	Sia Furler; Benjamin Levin; Mikkel S. Eriksen; Tor Erik Hermansen	The Secret Daughter: Songs from the Original TV Series (The Secret Edition)	2017	
"Do It Again"	Jessica Mauboy	Jessica Mauboy; Audius Mtawarira; Leon Seenandan	Been Waiting	2009	
"Dumb Things"	Jessica Mauboy	Paul Kelly	The Secret Daughter Season Two: Songs from the Original 7 Series	2017	
"Empty"	Jessica Mauboy	Jessica Mauboy; Adam Reily	Been Waiting	2008	
"Everyone" †	Jessica Mauboy with Jody Williams, Sean Kingston, Tabitha Nauser and Stevie Appleton	Ken Lim	—N/a	2010	
"Fall at Your Feet"	Jessica Mauboy	Neil Finn	The Secret Daughter Season Two: Songs from the Original 7 Series	2017	
"Fallin'" †	Jessica Mauboy	Jessica Mauboy; Ivy Adara; Peter James Harding; Louis Schoorl	The Secret Daughter Season Two: Songs from the Original 7 Series	2017	
"Fight for You"	Jessica Mauboy	Harvey Mason, Jr. Jessica Mauboy; Mansur Zafr; Dewain Whitmore Jr.	Get 'Em Girls	2010	
"First Nation" †	Midnight Oil featuring Jessica Mauboy & Tasman Keith	Robert Hirst, Tasman Keith Jarrett	The Makarrata Project	2020	
"Flame Trees"	Jessica Mauboy	Steve Prestwich; Don Walker	The Secret Daughter: Songs from the Original TV Series	2016	
"Foreign"	Jessica Mauboy	Crystal Nicole; Ronnie Jackson; Philip Cornish; Jessica Mauboy	Get 'Em Girls	2010	
"Forget Your Name"	Jessica Mauboy	Jessica Mauboy; Claude Kelly; Michael R. Mentore; Fredrik Odesjo; Andreas Levander	Get 'Em Girls	2010	
"Galaxy" † (Note: Denotes songs which were included on the re-release of Get 'Em Girls in 2011.)	Jessica Mauboy featuring Stan Walker	Brett McLaughlin; Ferras Alqaisi; Richard Vission; Chico Bennett; Brad Ackley	Get 'Em Girls	2011	
"Get Back Up"	Jessica Mauboy		Hilda	2019	
"Get 'Em Girls" †	Jessica Mauboy featuring Snoop Dogg	David Bruchanan; Bangladesh; Snoop Dogg	Get 'Em Girls	2010	
"Get Used to Me"	Jessica Mauboy	Diane Warren	The Sapphires	2012	
"Go (I Don't Need You)"	Jessica Mauboy	Jessica Mauboy; Brian Kennedy; Dante Jones; Ross James Irwin; Samantha Nathan	Beautiful	2013	
"Good Times"	Jessica Mauboy featuring J.R. Reyne	George Young; Johannes Hendrikus	The Secret Daughter: Songs from the Original TV Series	2016	
"Gotcha"	Jessica Mauboy	Ilan Kidron; Jessica Mauboy; Louis Schoorl	The Sapphires	2012	
"Handle It"	Jessica Mauboy	Pierre Medor; Thurston Hargrove; Bianca Atterberry; Gary White	Get 'Em Girls	2010	
"Have You Ever?"	Jessica Mauboy	Diane Warren	The Journey	2007	
"Have Yourself a Merry Little Christmas"	Jessica Mauboy	Ralph Blane; Hugh Martin	The Spirit of Christmas 2009	2009	
"Heartbreak Party"	Jessica Mauboy	Harvey Mason, Jr. Damon Thomas; Britt Burton; Andrew Hey	Beautiful	2013	
"Here for Me"	Jessica Mauboy	Harvey Mason, Jr. Steven Russell; Dewain Whitmore Jr.	Get 'Em Girls	2010	
"High"	Jessica Mauboy	Paul Tucker	The Secret Daughter Season Two: Songs from the Original 7 Series	2017	
"Home to Me"	Jessica Mauboy	Mauboy; Emma Birdsall; Schoorl	The Secret Daughter: Songs from the Original TV Series	2016	
"Honest"	Jessica Mauboy	Jessica Mauboy; Brian Kennedy; Adam Reily	Beautiful	2013	
"I Am Australian" †	Jessica Mauboy with Dami Im, Justice Crew, Nathaniel Willemse, Samantha Jade and Taylor Henderson featuring John Foreman	Dobe Newton; Bruce Woodley	—N/a	2014	
"I Believe"	Jessica Mauboy	Jessica Mauboy; Adam Reily	Beautiful	2013	
"I Believe – Anything Is Possible" †	Jessica Mauboy	Jessica Mauboy; Adam Reily	—N/a	2014	
"I Can't Help Myself (Sugar Pie Honey Bunch)"	Jessica Mauboy	Edward Holland, Jr. Lamont Dozier; Brian Holland	The Sapphires	2012	
"I Fought the Law"	Jessica Mauboy	Sonny Curtis	The Secret Daughter: Songs from the Original TV Series (The Secret Edition)	2017	
"I Heard It Through the Grapevine"	Jessica Mauboy	Barrett Strong; Norman Whitfield	The Sapphires	2012	
"I'll Be There"	Jessica Mauboy	Harvey Mason, Jr. Damon Thomas; Britt Burton; Mike Daley; J Que Smith	Beautiful	2013	
"I'll Take You There"	Jessica Mauboy	Alvertis Isbell	The Sapphires	2012	
"Impossible"	Jessica Mauboy	Alicia Keys	The Journey	2007	
"Inescapable" †	Jessica Mauboy	Diane Warren	Get 'Em Girls	2011	
"In Love Again"	Jessica Mauboy	Jessica Mauboy; Adam Reily	Beautiful	2013	
"It Must Have Been Love"	Jessica Mauboy	Per Gessle	The Secret Daughter: Songs from the Original TV Series	2016	
"Jealous"	Jessica Mauboy		Hilda	2019	
"Just Like You"	Jessica Mauboy		Hilda	2019	
"Just My Imagination (Running Away with Me)"	Jessica Mauboy	Norman Whitfield; Barrett Strong	The Sapphires	2012	
"Karma"	Jessica Mauboy	Alicia Keys; Taneisha Smith; Kerry Brothers, Jr.	The Journey	2007	
"Kick Up Your Heels"	Jessica Mauboy featuring Pitbull	Jonathan Perkins; Jeremy Skaller; Nikki Flores; Armando Perez	Beautiful	2013	
"Kiss Me Hello"	Jessica Mauboy	Jessica Mauboy; Al-Sherrod "A-Rod" Lambert; Chaz Mishan; David Delazyn	Beautiful	2013	
"Land of a Thousand Dances"	Jessica Mauboy	Christopher Kenner	The Sapphires	2012	
"Let Me Be Me" †	Jessica Mauboy	Steve Robson; Karen Poole; Jade Ewen; Azi Jegbefume; Narran McLean	Been Waiting	2008	
"Light a Light"	Jessica Mauboy and Brendon Boney	Jimmy Chi; Stephen Pigram	Bran Nue Dae	2010	
"Light Surrounding You"	Jessica Mauboy	Dann Hume; Jon Hume	The Secret Daughter Season Two: Songs from the Original 7 Series	2017	
"Like This"	Jessica Mauboy featuring Iyaz	Jessica Mauboy; Audius Mtawarira; Leon Seenandan; Keidran Jones; Steve Lobel; Sean Parekh	Get 'Em Girls	2010	
"Listen to the Music"	Jessica Mauboy	Tom Johnston	The Secret Daughter Season Two: Songs from the Original 7 Series	2017	
"Little Things" †	Jessica Mauboy		Hilda	2019	
"Love of the Common People"	Jessica Mauboy	John Hurley and Ronnie Wilkins	The Secret Daughter: Songs from the Original TV Series (The Secret Edition)	2017	
"Love Me Tender"	Elvis Presley featuring Jessica Mauboy	Elvis Presley; Vera Matson	Viva Elvis	2010	
"Lover (You Don't Treat Me No Good)"	Jessica Mauboy	Dan Pritzker	The Secret Daughter Season Two: Songs from the Original 7 Series	2017	
"Magical" (Note: "Magical" was a B-side to "Running Back".)	Jessica Mauboy	Audius Mtawarira; Jessica Mauboy	B-side to Running Back	2008	
"Make It Alright"	Jessica Mauboy	Harvey Mason, Jr. Steven Russell; Dewain Whitmore Jr. Andrew Hey	Get 'Em Girls	2011	
"Maze"	Jessica Mauboy	Claude Kelly; Jessica Mauboy; Michael R. Mentore; Fredrik Odesjo; Andreas Levander	Get 'Em Girls	2010	
"Mess Is Mine"	Jessica Mauboy	Vance Joy	The Secret Daughter: Songs from the Original TV Series (The Secret Edition)	2017	
"Miss You Most (At Christmas Time)"	Jessica Mauboy	Walter Afanasieff; Mariah Carey	Stars of Christmas	2009	
"Misty Blue"	Jessica Mauboy	Bob Montgomery	The Sapphires	2012	
"Never Be the Same" †	Jessica Mauboy	Jessica Mauboy; Anthony Egizii; David Musumeci	Beautiful	2013	
"Never Ever"	Jessica Mauboy		Hilda	2019	
"Ngarra Burra Ferra"	Jessica Mauboy with Lou Bennett, Juanita Tippens and Jade MacRae	Unknown	The Sapphires	2012	
"No One Like You"	Jessica Mauboy	Ronnie Jackson; Crystal Johnson; Jessica Mauboy; Tiyon "TC" Mack	Get 'Em Girls	2010	
"Nobody Knows"	Jessica Mauboy	Jessica Mauboy; Andre Harris; Alex James; Nikholai Greene; Kasey Phillips	Get 'Em Girls	2011	
"Not Me"	Jessica Mauboy	Audius Mtawarira; Leon Seenandan; Jessica Mauboy	Get 'Em Girls	2010	
"Nothing to Lose"	Jessica Mauboy	Jessica Mauboy; Anthony Egizii; David Musumeci	Beautiful	2014	
"Now I Know" (Note: "Now I Know" was a B-side to "Been Waiting".)	Jessica Mauboy	Audius Mtawarira; Leon Seenandan; Jessica Mauboy; Nate Wade	B-side to Been Waiting	2009	
"On the Radio"	Jessica Mauboy	Donna Summer; Giorgio Moroder	The Journey	2007	
"Over and Over" (Note: "Over and Over" was a B-side on "To the End of the Earth"'s physical release.)	Jessica Mauboy	Anthony Egizii; David Musumeci; Jessica Mauboy	B-Side to To the End of the Earth	2013	
"Palace"	Jessica Mauboy	Jessica Mauboy; Louis Schoorl; Alex Hope	Beautiful	2014	
"Photograph"	Jessica Mauboy	Ed Sheeran; Johnny McDaid	The Secret Daughter: Songs from the Original TV Series	2016	
"Pig the Pug"	Jessica Mauboy and Aron Blabey		as part of Big W Rap Books	2020	
"Plans"	Jessica Mauboy featuring J. R. Reyne)	Anthony Jackson; Ian Kenny; Adam Spark; Adam Weston	The Secret Daughter Season Two: Songs from the Original 7 Series	2017	
"Pop a Bottle (Fill Me Up)" †	Jessica Mauboy	Jessica Mauboy; Mario Marchetti; Gino Barletta; Rebecca Johnson	Beautiful	2013	
"Rather Be"	Jessica Mauboy	Jack Patterson; James Napier; Nicole Marshall; Grace Chatto	The Secret Daughter Season Two: Songs from the Original 7 Series	2017	
"Reconnected"	Jessica Mauboy	Dwayne Nesmith; Tyrrell Bing; Dominic Gordon; Shantee Tyler; Brandon Hesson	Get 'Em Girls	2010	
"Respect"	Jessica Mauboy	Otis Redding	The Secret Daughter Season Two: Songs from the Original 7 Series	2017	
"Risk It" †	Jessica Mauboy	David Musumeci; Anthony Egizii; Jörgen Elofsson; Tania Doko	The Secret Daughter: Songs from the Original TV Series	2016	
"Rocks"	Jessica Mauboy featuring J.R. Reyne	Bobby Gillespie; Andrew Innes; Robert Young	The Secret Daughter: Songs from the Original TV Series	2016	
"Run"	Jessica Mauboy	Christopher Rojas; Jessica Mauboy; A. Breingan; Alex James	Get 'Em Girls	2011	
"Runnin'"	Jessica Mauboy	Jessica Mauboy; Anthony Egizii; David Musumeci	Been Waiting	2009	
"Running Back" †	Jessica Mauboy featuring Flo Rida	Jessica Mauboy; Audius Mtawarira; Sean Ray Mullins	Been Waiting	2008	
"Saturday Night" †	Jessica Mauboy featuring Ludacris	Brian Kennedy; Angie Iron; Ludacris	Get 'Em Girls	2010	
"Scariest Part"	Jessica Mauboy	E. Kidd Bogart; C. Harmony; Andrew Dorff	Get 'Em Girls	2010	
"Sea of Flags" †	Jessica Mauboy	Jessica Mauboy; Ilan Kidron; Stuart Crichton	—N/a	2014	
"Selfish" †	Jessica Mauboy		Hilda	2019	
"Should I Stay or Should I Go"	Jessica Mauboy	Joe Strummer; Mick Jones	The Secret Daughter: Songs from the Original TV Series	2016	
"Sleigh Ride"	Human Nature featuring Jessica Mauboy	Leroy Anderson	The Christmas Album	2014	
"Solid Rock"	Jessica Mauboy	Shane Howard	The Secret Daughter Season Two: Songs from the Original 7 Series	2017	
"Something Stupid"	Jessica Mauboy featuring Isaiah Firebrace	C. Carson Parks	The Secret Daughter Season Two: Songs from the Original 7 Series	2017	
"Something About You"	Jessica Mauboy	Mauboy; Hope; Birdsall; Schoorl	The Secret Daughter: Songs from the Original TV Series	2016	
"Something's Got a Hold on Me" †	Jessica Mauboy	Pearl Woods; Leroy Kirkland; Etta James	—N/a	2013	
"Spirit of the Anzacs" †	Lee Kernaghan featuring Guy Sebastian, Sheppard, Jon Stevens, Jessica Mauboy, Shannon Noll and Megan Washington	Colin Buchanan; Lee Kernaghan; Garth Porter	Spirit of the Anzacs	2015	
"Stand by Your Man"	Jessica Mauboy	Billy Sherrill; Tammy Wynette	Bran Nue Dae	2010	
"Stuck in the Middle"	Jessica Mauboy	Jessica Mauboy; Ilan Kidron	The Secret Daughter: Songs from the Original TV Series	2016	
"Sunday" †	Jessica Mauboy		Hilda	2019	
"Tainted Love"	Jessica Mauboy	Ed Cobb	The Secret Daughter: Songs from the Original TV Series	2016	
"That Girl"	Jessica Mauboy	Jessica Mauboy; Audius Mtawarira; Leon Seenandan	Been Waiting	2009	
"Thinkin Bout You"	Jessica Mauboy	Christopher Francis Ocean	iTunes Session	2014	
"This Ain't Love" †	Jessica Mauboy	Jessica Mauboy; David Sneddon; Carl Ryden	Non-album single	2015	
"Time After Time"	Jessica Mauboy	Cyndi Lauper; Rob Hyman	Been Waiting	2008	
"To Sir With Love"	Jessica Mauboy	Mark London; Don Black	The Journey	2007	
"To the Floor"	Jessica Mauboy	Jessica Mauboy; Audius Mtawarira; Sean Ray Mullins	Been Waiting	2008	
"Today I Started Loving You Again"	Jessica Mauboy with Juanita Tippens and Jade MacRae	Bonnie Owens; Merle Haggard	The Sapphires	2012	
"Together Again"	Jessica Mauboy	Janet Jackson; Jimmy Jam and Terry Lewis; René Elizondo Jr.	The Journey	2007	
"Tough Love"	Jessica Mauboy		Hilda	2019	
"Tracks of My Tears"	Jessica Mauboy	William Robinson; Warren Moore; Marvin Tarplin	The Sapphires	2012	
"Then I Met You" †	Jessica Mauboy	Ivy Adara; Lindsey Jackson; Louis Schoorl	The Secret Daughter Season Two: Songs from the Original 7 Series	2017	
"20 Good Reasons"	Jessica Mauboy	Rai Thistlethwayte	The Secret Daughter Season Two: Songs from the Original 7 Series	2017	
"Under the Milky Way"	Jessica Mauboy	Steve Kilbey; Karin Jansson	The Secret Daughter Season Two: Songs from the Original 7 Series	2017	
"Up/Down" †	Jessica Mauboy	Kwamé Holland; Frankie Storm	Been Waiting	2008	
"Used2B"	Jessica Mauboy	Adam Reily; Craig Hardy	Been Waiting	2008	
"Wake Me Up" †	Jessica Mauboy	Avicii; Aloe Blacc; Mike Einziger; Melinda Marie Marantz; Aileen Marie Quinn	The Secret Daughter: Songs from the Original TV Series	2016	
"Walk Away"	Jessica Mauboy	Raine Maida; Chantal Kreviazuk; Kara DioGuardi; Kelly Clarkson	The Journey	2007	
"Waltzing Matilda" †	Jessica Mauboy and Stan Walker	Banjo Paterson	—N/a	2012	
"We Got Love" †	Jessica Mauboy	David Musumeci; Anthony Egizii; Jessica Mauboy	—N/a	2018	
"What a Man"	Jessica Mauboy	Dave Crawford	The Sapphires	2012	
"What Happened to Us" †	Jessica Mauboy featuring Jay Sean	Josh Alexander; Jeremy Skaller; Rob Larow; Khaled Rohaim; Israel Cruz; Jay Sean; Billy Steinberg	Get 'Em Girls	2010	
"Where Did Our Love Go"	Jessica Mauboy	Lamont Dozier; Brian Holland; Edward Holland, Jr.	The Sapphires	2012	
"Where I'll Stay" †	Jessica Mauboy	David Musumeci; Anthony Egizii; Sarah Aarons; R. Pym	—N/a	2016	
"Who We're Meant to Be"	Jessica Mauboy		Hilda	2019	
"Wish You Well"	Jessica Mauboy		Hilda	2019	
"Who's Lovin' You"	Jessica Mauboy	William Robinson	The Sapphires	2012	
"Words"	Jessica Mauboy	Barry Gibb; Maurice Gibb; Robin Gibb	The Journey	2007	
"Yellow Bird"	Jessica Mauboy and Lou Bennett	Norman Luboff; Marilyn Keith; Alan Bergman	The Sapphires	2012	

== See also ==
- Jessica Mauboy discography
