= Jessica Mauboy videography =

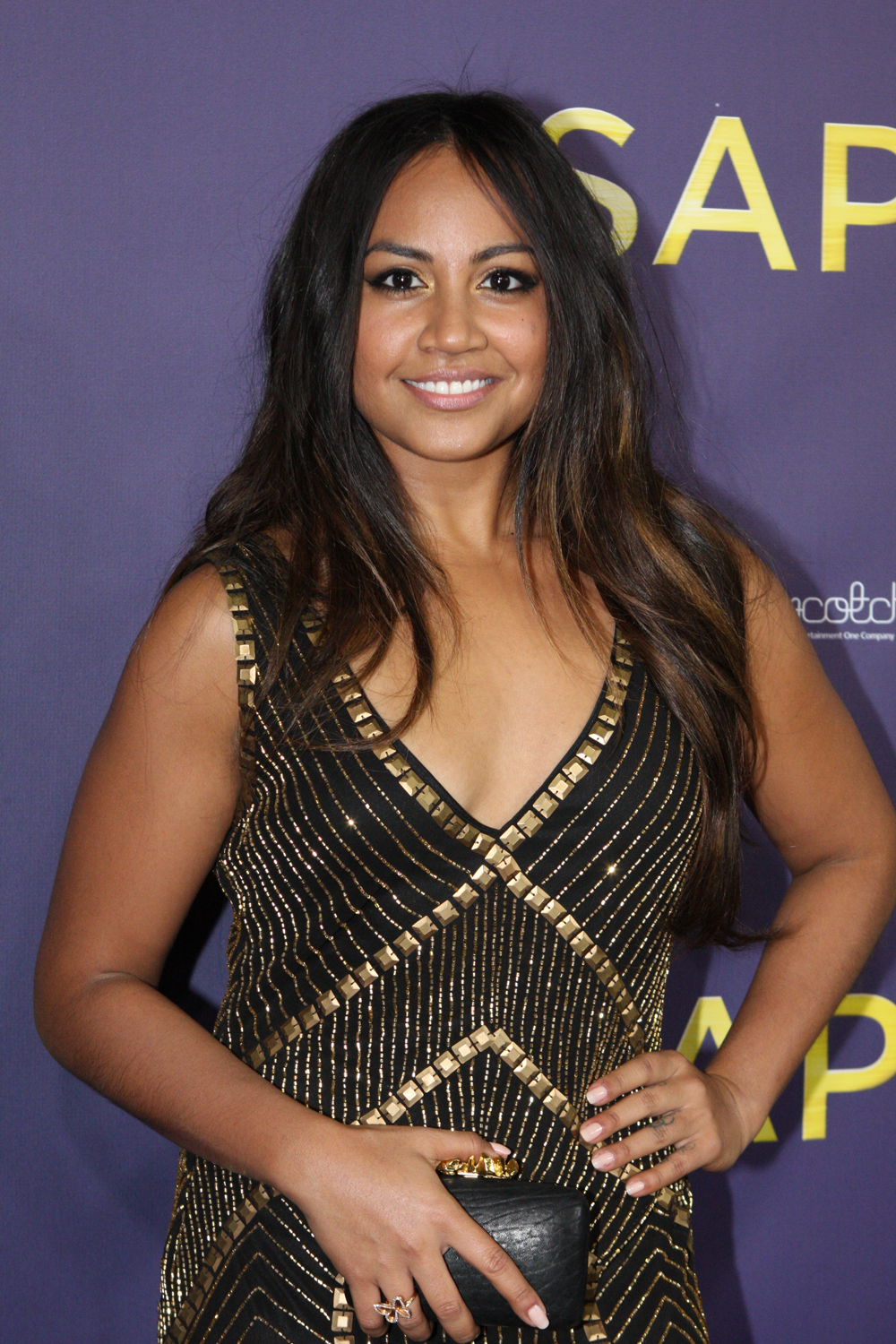
Mauboy attending the Australian premiere of The Sapphires in August 2012

Australian singer and actress Jessica Mauboy has released one video album and appeared in thirty music videos, two films, and many television programs and commercials. After she became the runner-up on the fourth season of Australian Idol in 2006, Mauboy signed a recording contract with Sony Music Australia. In 2008, she released her debut studio album Been Waiting and six music videos for its singles were shot. Mauboy's first music video was for the album's lead single "Running Back" featuring American rapper Flo Rida. It was directed by Fin Edquist and portrayed a fictional relationship between Mauboy and Flo Rida. At the 2009 MTV Australia Awards, the video was nominated for Best Collaboration. Keir McFarlane directed the music videos for the following singles, "Burn" and the title track "Been Waiting". The music video for the fifth single "Up/Down" was directed by Sequoia and shot in Los Angeles.

In 2010, Mauboy made her acting debut in the musical comedy-drama film Bran Nue Dae alongside Missy Higgins and Geoffrey Rush. The film received mixed reviews from critics, despite its box office success in Australia. That same year, Mauboy released her second studio album Get 'Em Girls and five music videos for its singles were shot. American director Hype Williams directed the music videos for the title track "Get 'Em Girls" and "Saturday Night" which were both filmed in Los Angeles. The video for "Get 'Em Girls", which featured Mauboy strutting the catwalk and modelling a variety of looks, was heavily criticised by fans on YouTube who described it as "cheap", "tacky" and "disappointing". American rapper Snoop Dogg's appearance in the video was described by some fans as "hypersexual" and "sleazy". The music videos for the album's following singles "What Happened to Us" and "Inescapable" were directed by Mark Alston, who previously directed the video for Mauboy's 2009 single "Let Me Be Me". In 2012, Mauboy starred alongside Chris O'Dowd in the musical film The Sapphires, which earned her the AACTA Award for Best Actress in a Supporting Role. The film received positive reviews from critics and was a box office success in Australia.

The music video for "Never Be the Same", the fourth single from her third studio album Beautiful (2013), was directed by Lawrence Lim and featured Australian actress Miah Madden playing a younger version of Mauboy. It was nominated for Best Video at the 2014 ARIA Music Awards. The music video for the fifth single "Can I Get a Moment?" received mixed opinions from fans on YouTube and Twitter who complained about Mauboy's outfits and the video's budget. Nick Waterman directed the music video for the album's next single "The Day Before I Met You", which was shot in Mauboy's hometown of Darwin. It featured appearances by her parents, sisters and grandmother, as well as children from the Aboriginal communities of Kulaluk and Bagot. Mauboy was cast in the lead role of the television drama series The Secret Daughter, which premiered on the Seven Network on 3 October 2016. It was Mauboy's first major TV role and was written especially for her. The role earned Mauboy her first Logie Award nomination for Best Actress, and the show was renewed for a second and final season in 2017.

== Music videos ==
Title	Year	Other performer(s)	Album	Ref.
"Running Back"	2008	Flo Rida	Been Waiting	
"Burn"	2008	—N/a	Been Waiting	
"Been Waiting"	2009	—N/a	Been Waiting	
"Because"	2009	—N/a	Been Waiting	
"Up/Down"	2009	—N/a	Been Waiting	
"Let Me Be Me"	2009	—N/a	Been Waiting	
"Everyone"	2010	Steve Appleton, Sean Kingston, Tabitha Nauser and Jody Williams	—N/a	
"Get 'Em Girls"	2010	Snoop Dogg	Get 'Em Girls	
"Saturday Night"	2010	Ludacris	Get 'Em Girls	
"Saturday Night" (without Ludacris)	2010	—N/a	Get 'Em Girls	
"What Happened to Us"	2011	Jay Sean	Get 'Em Girls	
"Inescapable"	2011	—N/a	Get 'Em Girls	
"Galaxy"	2011	Stan Walker	Get 'Em Girls	
"Who's Loving You"	2012	—N/a	The Sapphires	
"I Can't Help Myself (Sugar Pie Honey Bunch)"	2012	—N/a	The Sapphires	
"Gotcha"	2012	—N/a	The Sapphires	
"To the End of the Earth"	2013	—N/a	Beautiful	
"Pop a Bottle (Fill Me Up)"	2013	—N/a	Beautiful	
"Beautiful"	2013	—N/a	Beautiful	
"Never Be the Same"	2014	—N/a	Beautiful	
"Can I Get a Moment?"	2014	—N/a	Beautiful	
"The Day Before I Met You"	2015	—N/a	Beautiful	
"This Ain't Love"	2015	—N/a	Fourth studio album	
"Risk It"	2016	—N/a	The Secret Daughter: Songs from the Original TV Series	
"Fallin'"	2017	—N/a	The Secret Daughter Season Two: Songs from the Original 7 Series	
"Then I Met You"	2017	—N/a	The Secret Daughter Season Two: Songs from the Original 7 Series	
"We Got Love"	2018	—N/a	—N/a	
"Sunday"	2019	—N/a	Hilda	
"Little Things"	2019	—N/a	Hilda	
"Selfish"	2019	—N/a	Hilda	
"Glow"	2021			

=== Guest appearances ===
Title	Year	Performer(s)	Album	Ref.
"Spirit of the Anzacs"	2015	Lee Kernaghan featuring Guy Sebastian, Sheppard, Jon Stevens, Jessica Mauboy, Shannon Noll and Megan Washington	Spirit of the Anzacs	

== Video albums ==
Title	Album details
All the Hits Live	Released: 6 October 2017; Label: Sony Music Australia; Formats: Blu-ray, DVD

== Films ==
Year	Title	Role	Notes
2010	Bran Nue Dae	Rosie	
2012	The Sapphires	Julie McCrae	

== Television ==
Year	Title	Role	Episode(s)	Notes
2010	Underbelly: Razor	Gloria Starr	"Armageddon" (Episode 13)	Played the role of a nightclub singer.
2011	The Oprah Winfrey Show	Herself	Season 25 special, "Oprah's Ultimate Australian Adventure: Part 1"	Mauboy's performance at the Federation Square in Melbourne, ahead of Oprah Winfrey's visit to the place, was featured in the first of the four Australian specials of The Oprah Winfrey Show.
2013	The Voice Australia	Herself	Season 2, episodes 10, 11, 12 and 13	Mauboy appeared as a mentor for the show's battle rounds and paired up with coach Ricky Martin to help mentor the contestants in his team.
2013	The Ellen DeGeneres Show	Herself	Season 10, episode 1.636; Season 10 special, "Ellen in Melbourne"	Mauboy appeared as a guest to promote the release of The Sapphires in the United States. Mauboy later appeared in one of the Australian specials, where she participated in a singing quiz segment for Ellen DeGeneres' Melbourne show.
2013	Dance Academy	Herself	"Start of an Era" (Season 3, episode 11)	Mauboy played herself and performed the song "Over and Over".
2014	Sesame Street	Herself	"Judy and the Beast" (Season 44, episode 19)	Mauboy appeared in a clip that was filmed in Alice Springs, singing the song "Count the Kangaroos". The clip focused on the number five and featured five animated kangaroos, five boomerangs and five children from Yipirinya State Primary School.
2014	Jessica Mauboy's Road to Eurovision	Herself	—N/a	A 60-minute documentary that aired on SBS on 10 May 2014. It followed Mauboy as she prepared for her performance at the 2014 Eurovision Song Contest in Denmark. The documentary also included exclusive access to Mauboy's family and Eurovision mentor Julia Zemiro showing her the sights of Denmark.
2014	The X Factor Australia	Herself	Season 6, episode 10	Mauboy appeared as a mentor for the show's home visits round and paired up with judge Dannii Minogue to help mentor the acts in her Groups category.
2016–17	The Secret Daughter	Billie Carter	Seasons 1–2; lead role	Mauboy portrayed a part-time country pub singer whose life changes after coming in contact with a rich hotelier.
2016	Home and Away	Herself	Season 29 finale	Mauboy appeared on the show as herself and performed at the Summer Bay Groove Festival.
2017	Jessica Mauboy – All the Hits Live	Herself	—N/a	A television special of Mauboy's headlining tour, All the Hits Live – The Australian Tour, filmed in Sydney in April 2017. The special premiered on Foxtel's V Hits channel on 21 July 2017.
2018	Eurovision Song Contest 2018	Herself	Semi Final 2, Grand Final	Representative for Australia, finished twentieth.
2019	Saturday Night Rove	Herself	Premiere – Episode 1	First guest on premiere episode of Rove McManus' new Australian variety show.

== Commercials ==
Year	Company/product	Notes
2007	Head & Shoulders	
2011	Nintendo 3DS	The commercial was made to promote the video game Nintendogs + Cats 3DS.
2013	National Rugby League (NRL)	Mauboy appeared in the commercial singing her cover version of Etta James' "Something's Got a Hold on Me", which was used as the theme song for the 2013 NRL season.
2013	Woolworths	The commercial was made to promote the Woolworths Earn & Learn program. Mauboy appeared the commercial with students from Wulagi Primary School in Darwin.
2014	Swisse	
2014	Telstra	Mauboy appeared in the commercial as part of Telstra's commitment to its customers campaign.
2015	Target Australia	Mauboy appeared in the commercial to showcase Target's range of Christmas decorations.
2016	Target Australia	Mauboy appeared in the commercial alongside Sonia Kruger, Dannii Minogue and Fiona Falkiner as part of Target's "Find Your Jeans" campaign.
2016	The Secret Daughter	The commercial was released to promote the television show and features scenes of Mauboy as her character Billie Carter.
2017	Fox League	The commercial featured Mauboy showing her loyalty to the North Queensland Cowboys by speaking with and poking fun at her favourite NRL team’s rivals, including the Cronulla-Sutherland Sharks, Brisbane Broncos, the Canterbury-Bankstown Bulldogs and the South Sydney Rabbitohs.

== See also ==
- Jessica Mauboy discography
