= First Nation (song) =

2020 single by Midnight Oil featuring Jessica Mauboy and Tasman Keith)

Single by Midnight Oil featuring Jessica Mauboy and Tasman Keith

from the album The Makarrata Project
- Released: 25 September 2020
- Recorded: 2019
- Length: 4:51
- Label: Sony Music Australia
- Songwriters: Robert Hirst, Tasman Keith
- Producer: Warne Livesey

Midnight Oil singles chronology
"Gadigal Land" (2020)	"First Nation" (2020)	"Rising Seas" (2021)

Jessica Mauboy singles chronology
"Butterfly" (2020)	"First Nation" (2020)	"Glow" (2021)

Tasman Keith singles chronology
"64 Bars" (2020)	"First Nation" (2020)	"No Country" (2020)

"First Nation" is a song by Australian rock band Midnight Oil featuring Jessica Mauboy and Tasman Keith. The song was released on 25 September 2020 as the second single from the band's twelfth studio album The Makarrata Project; a themed mini-album of collaborations with Indigenous artists.

At the 2021 ARIA Music Awards, the Robert Hambling directed video was nominated for Best Video.

At the APRA Music Awards of 2022, the song was nominated for Song of the Year.

== Background and recording ==
Tasman Keith said Midnight Oil contacted him and asking to contribute to the album, which Keith described as "a surreal moment". Keith said "the first song they had in mind for me, I wasn't sure about it, I couldn't see myself adding to it, so they played me a few other songs, when I heard 'First Nation', I knew it was the one." Keith felt connected to the song and wrote his own verse, putting his own touch on the tune, which made the final version. Keith said it was only once he was in the studio that someone told him that Jessica Mauboy was also contributing vocals to the song as well with Keith confessing "It was a while before I processed it all, I was too busy working to get star struck, but a few weeks later, it hit me, I have a song with Jess Mauboy and Midnight Oil."

Jessica Mauboy told National Indigenous Times she was "pinching herself the entire time they were recording", and she felt "a deep connection to the track". Mauboy said "This is such a signature for Midnight Oil. This is their identity. The lyrics are so proper true, tears started rolling out my eyes when I heard it and I looked at Peter and he started crying. It was the first time falling in love with it … when I got an MP3 file I was playing it non-stop."

== Live performances ==
The group performed the song on The Sound on 1 November 2020.

== Critical reception ==
In an album review, Bernard Zuel from The Guardian described the song as having "tense-but-rhythmic groove" and believed it echoed their 1987 single "Put Down That Weapon".

Also in an album review, Timothy Monger from AllMusic said "The powerful opener (First Nation) weaves its collaborators seamlessly into Midnight Oil's wiry guitar attack with pop singer Jessica Mauboy and rapper Tasman Keith adding some youthful fire into the mix."
