= Where I'll Stay =

Single by Jessica Mauboy
- Released: 11 March 2016
- Genre: Pop
- Length: 3:33
- Label: Sony Music Australia
- Songwriter(s): Jessica Mauboy; David Musumeci; Anthony Egizii; Sarah Aarons; R. Pym

Jessica Mauboy singles chronology
"Chains" (2015)	"Where I'll Stay" (2016)	"Risk It" (2016)

"Where I'll Stay" is a song by Australian recording artist Jessica Mauboy. It was released digitally on 11 March 2016. The song was released as the Australian theme song for the 2016 Olympic Games.

Mauboy told Sunrise the song "came from the heart", adding "I wanted to do something that was empowering and fearless and something that makes you feel triumphant and strong" adding the song fit right for the Olympics.

== Music video ==
A music video produced by Network 7 was released featuring Australian Olympians lip-syncing to the song. The video features athletes from across the sports of rugby, synchronized swimming, women's football (soccer) and water polo teams as well as with athletes from the Australian swimming, BMX, athletics, and cycling programs.

== Track listing ==
- Digital download
1. "Where I'll Stay" – 3:33

== Charts ==
Chart (2016)	Peak position
Australia (ARIA)	144
Australian Artist Singles (ARIA)	17

== Release history ==
Country	Date	Format	Label
Australia	11 March 2016	Digital download	Sony Music Australia
