= Burn (Jessica Mauboy song) =

2008 single by Jessica Mauboy

Single by Jessica Mauboy

from the album Been Waiting
- B-side: "Runnin'"
- Released: 17 November 2008
- Genre: R&B; dance-pop
- Length: 2:53
- Label: Sony
- Songwriters: Taj Jackson; Mich Hansen; Jonas Jeberg
- Producers: Jonas Jeberg; Cutfather

Jessica Mauboy singles chronology
"Running Back" (2008)	"Burn" (2008)	"Been Waiting" (2009)

Music video
- "Burn" on YouTube

"Burn" is a song by Australian recording artist Jessica Mauboy. It was written by Taj Jackson, Jonas Jeberg, and Mich Hansen and was produced by Jeberg and Cutfather. "Burn" was released digitally on 17 November 2008 as the second single from Mauboy's debut studio album, Been Waiting (2008). Musically, "Burn" is an R&B-dance track that incorporates electronica influences. The song became Mauboy's first number-one on the ARIA Singles Chart and was certified platinum by the Australian Recording Industry Association for selling over 70,000 copies. "Burn" also became Mauboy's first charting single internationally, reaching number 92 on the Japan Hot 100.

In 2009, "Burn" received an ARIA No. 1 Chart Award and won 'Single of the Year' at The Deadly Awards. It was also nominated for 'Highest Selling Single' at the ARIA Music Awards. A corresponding music video for "Burn" was directed by Keir McFarlane and filmed at the Sydney Botanical Gardens. The video has garnered over one million views on YouTube/Vevo. In February 2012, "Burn" was featured in episode 17 of the fourth season of Packed to the Rafters. In 2014, a live version of "Burn" was featured on Mauboy's iTunes Session EP.

== Background and composition ==
"Burn"
A sample of "Burn," in which Jessica Mauboy sings the chorus and bridge.

"Burn" was written by Taj Jackson, Jonas Jeberg, and Mich Hansen and was produced by Jeberg and Cutfather. It was made available for digital purchase on 17 November 2008. A digital extended play with an additional track and two remixes of "Burn", was released on 24 November. "Burn" is an R&B-dance track, that incorporates electronica influences. The song is written in the key of F minor. Lyrically, it features Mauboy singing to a cheating lover, "Look what you did to me / I need a doctor, cos this is starting to burn!".

A writer for muumuse.com wrote about the composition and production of the release, "'Burn' is quite modern in terms of production, and equally addictive upon replay. It's a bit more up-tempo, a bit more stomptastic, and the chorus is quite ear-friendly. Still loving her voice. Very Alesha-esque, minus the more grating cat-like yelps that often plague a typical Dixon track. Oh, and she's only 19 years old, which makes her sort of like the superior, Australian version of Jordin Sparks, no?"

== Reception ==
=== Critical response ===
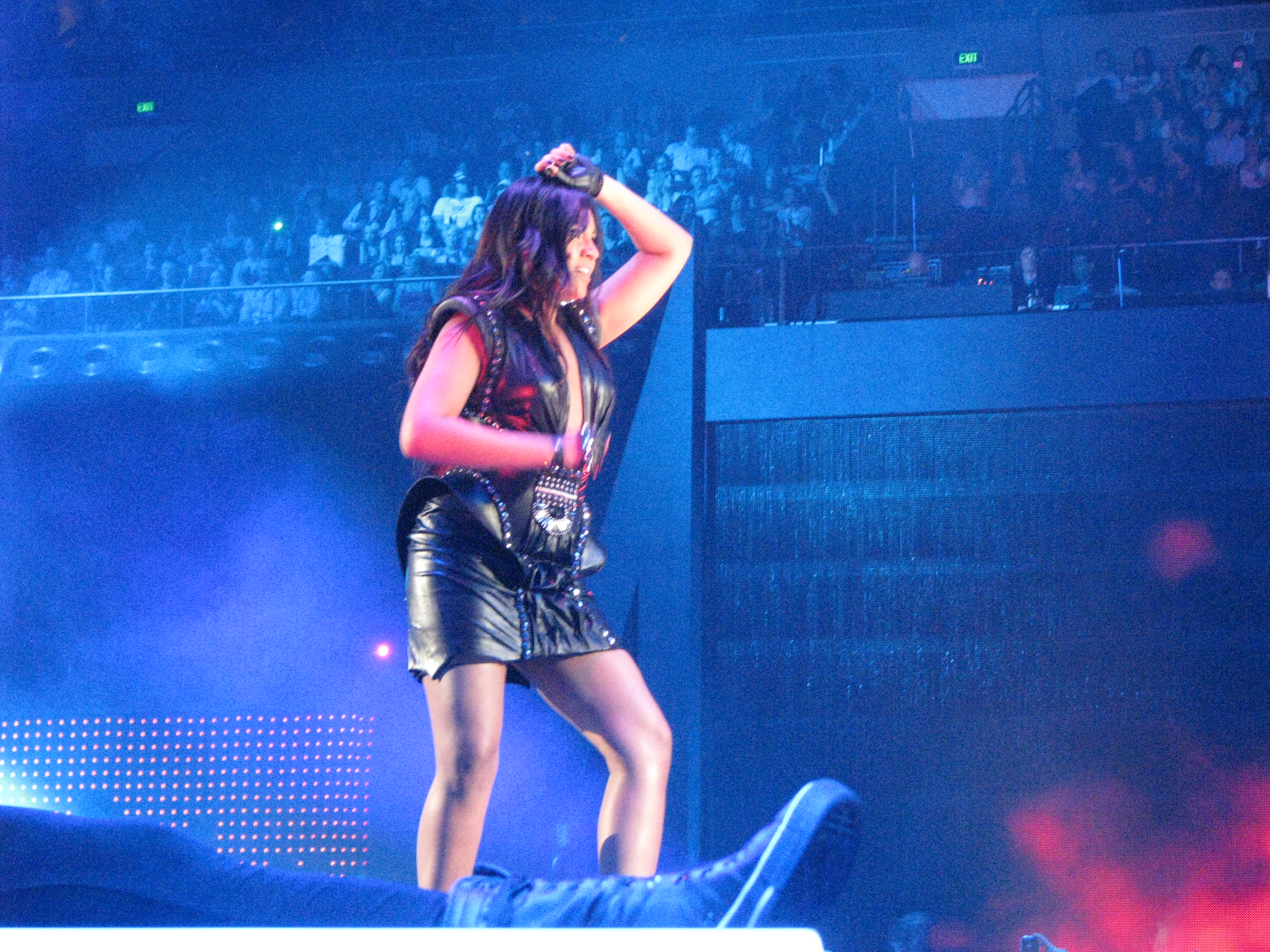
Mauboy performing "Burn" at the 2009 ARIA Music Awards.

Nick Bond of MTV Australia wrote that the song is "worthy of Rihanna". Davey Boy of Sputnikmusic compared "Burn" to Mauboy's previous single "Running Back", writing it "is almost as good with its restrained use of electronica combining with a contagious chorus to result in a song which will be just as at home on radio as it is in the clubs." Dung Le of Mediasearch found "Burn" more "catchier" than "Running Back" and noted that its R&B grooves and catchy chorus will set "Jessica up well for a big assault in 2009 and a possible overseas release." "Burn" was awarded an ARIA No. 1 Chart Award for reaching number one on the ARIA Singles Chart. At the 2009 Deadly Awards, "Burn" won 'Single of the Year'. It was nominated for 'Highest Selling Single' at the 2009 ARIA Music Awards, but her previous single "Running Back" took that title. "Burn" became the fourth most-played song on Australian radio stations by February 2009.

In February 2009, "Burn" was removed from most Melbourne contemporary hit radios playlists because of its title and the Victorian bushfires that occurred during the time. Mauboy's manager David Champion said that Mauboy understood and supported the decision, saying: "Jessica is very mindful of the terribly traumatic situation that is occurring in Victoria. She does not want in any way to add to people's distress." Program director of 91.5 FM added that: "We have removed several songs from our line-up out of respect for the victims caught up in the tragedy. Even though these songs had nothing to do with the bushfires, they were a reflection of it."

=== Chart performance ===
"Burn" debuted at number 30 on the ARIA Singles Chart on 1 December 2008. After climbing the chart for seven consecutive weeks, "Burn" peaked at number one on 19 January 2009 and became Mauboy's first number-one single in Australia. It was certified platinum by the Australian Recording Industry Association (ARIA), for selling 70,000 copies. It also became Mauboy's first charting single internationally when it reached number 92 on the Japan Hot 100 on 25 April 2009.

== Music video ==
Mauboy leads her dancers in the music video for "Burn."

The music video for "Burn" was directed by Keir McFarlane and filmed at the Sydney Botanical Gardens on 21 November 2008. The Vevo licensed music video was uploaded to YouTube on 2 October 2009. The video begins with Mauboy sitting in the driver's seat of a red ferrari and then moves on to sing and dance in front of a bush. While singing the chorus of the song, Mauboy is seen outdoors with her backup dancers in front of a background of flames. The video then crosses over to club scenes where Mauboy is dancing alongside a bunch of people.

== Live performances ==
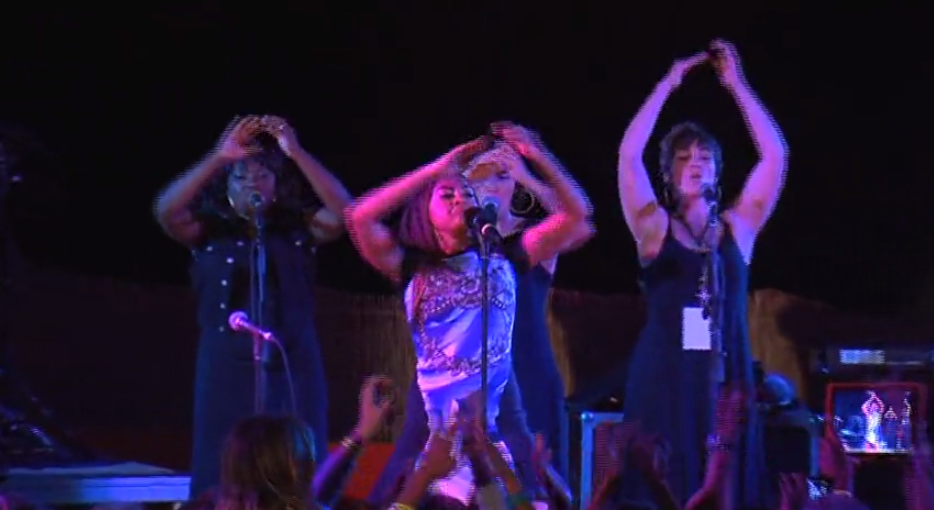
Mauboy performing "Burn" at the 2013 Mbantua Festival, a celebration of Aboriginal Australian culture, in Alice Springs, Northern Territory.

Mauboy performed "Burn" on the Australian Idol grand finale show on 23 November 2008. She also performed the song at the 2008 Sydney New Year's Eve event. On 11 January 2009, Mauboy performed "Burn" during a Twenty20 cricket match at the Melbourne Cricket Ground. On 19 January 2009, she performed "Burn" on Sunrise, which was broadcast live from the Rod Laver Arena, Melbourne. Mauboy performed the song at the Australia Day Live Concert held at the Parliament House, Canberra on 25 January 2009, dressed in a one piece black short jumpsuit. On 9 July 2009, Mauboy performed "Burn" at her first 'Live at the Chapel' concert, held at the Paddington Uniting Church in Sydney. At the 2009 ARIA Music Awards on 26 November, Mauboy performed a remixed version of "Burn", dressed in a black leather dress.

Mauboy performed "Burn" on her Galaxy Tour across Australia with Stan Walker from January through February 2012. Mauboy performed "Burn" again when she embarked on her first solo-headlining tour, the To the End of the Earth Tour, from 7 November 2013 to 24 January 2014 to help promote the release of her third studio album Beautiful (2013). Mauboy also performed the song at the Mbantua Festival, a celebration of Aboriginal Australian culture held in Alice Springs, Northern Territory. A live version of "Burn" was included on Mauboy's extended play iTunes Session (2014).

== Track listing ==
- Digital download
1. "Burn" – 2:53
- Digital EP
1. "Burn" – 2:52
2. "Runnin'" – 3:38
3. "Burn" (Nufirm Remix) – 4:40
4. "Burn" (Pop Embassy Remix) – 4:13

== Personnel ==
Credits adapted from the liner notes for Been Waiting.

- Don Bartley – mastering
- Tom Coyne – mastering
- Mich "Cutfather" Hansen – production
- Jonas Jeberg – production, programming
- Jessica Mauboy – vocals
- Audius Mtawarira – vocal production
- Matz Nilsson – mixing

== Charts ==
=== Weekly charts ===
Chart (2009)	Peak position
Australia (ARIA)	1
Australian Urban (ARIA)	1
Japan (Billboard Japan Hot 100)	92

=== Year-end charts ===
Chart (2008)	Rank
Australian Urban (ARIA)	36

Chart (2009)	Rank
Australia (ARIA)	43
Australian Artists (ARIA)	5
Australian Urban (ARIA)	9

== Certification ==
Region	Certification	Certified units/sales
Australia (ARIA)	Platinum	70,000^{^}
^{^} Shipments figures based on certification alone.

== Release history ==
Region	Release date	Format	Label	Ref.
Australia	17 November 2008	Digital download	Sony Music Australia	
Australia	24 November 2008	Digital EP	Sony Music Australia	

== See also ==
- List of number-one singles in Australia in 2009
- List of songs recorded by Jessica Mauboy
