= Let Me Be Me =

Single by Jessica Mauboy

from the album Been Waiting
- Released: 27 November 2009
- Recorded: 2008
- Genre: Pop; R&B
- Length: 3:50
- Label: Sony
- Songwriters: Steve Robson; Karen Poole; Jade Ewen; Azi Jegbefume; Narran McLean
- Producer: Fingaz

Jessica Mauboy singles chronology
"Up/Down" (2009)	"Let Me Be Me" (2009)	"Everyone" (2010)

Music video
- "Let Me Be Me" on YouTube

"Let Me Be Me" is the sixth and final single released from Australian singer Jessica Mauboy's debut studio album, Been Waiting. The song was written by Jade Ewen, Azi Jegbefume, Narran McLean, Karen Poole and Steve Robson, and was produced by Michael "Fingaz" Mugisha. It was released digitally and physically on 27 November 2009. "Let Me Be Me" debuted at number 33 on the ARIA Singles Chart and peaked at number 26 in its second week on the chart. The single spent nine weeks in the ARIA Top 50 Singles Chart.

== Track listing ==
- CD single / Digital EP
1. "Let Me Be Me" (Radio mix) – 3:50
2. "Up/Down" / "Been Waiting" medley (Acoustic) – 4:52
3. "Let Me Be Me" (Acoustic) – 3:37

== Charts ==
Chart (2009)	Peak position
Australia (ARIA)	26
Australian Urban (ARIA)	8

== Release history ==
Country	Date	Format	Label
Australia	27 November 2009	CD, digital download	Sony Music Australia
