= Sea of Flags =

Single by Jessica Mauboy

Single by Jessica Mauboy
- Released: 8 May 2014
- Recorded: 2014
- Genre: Synthpop
- Length: 3:54
- Label: Sony
- Songwriters: Jessica Mauboy; Ilan Kidron; Stuart Crichton
- Producer: Stuart Crichton

Jessica Mauboy singles chronology
"Never Be the Same" (2014)	"Sea of Flags" (2014)	"I Believe – Anything Is Possible" (2014)

"Sea of Flags" is a song by Australian recording artist Jessica Mauboy. It was written by Mauboy, Ilan Kidron and Stuart Crichton who also served as producer of the track. The song was performed live by Mauboy on 8 May 2014 at its debut during the interval of the second semi-final of the Eurovision Song Contest 2014 in Copenhagen, Denmark, directly after which it was released for digital download in Australia and throughout Europe. Mauboy also performed "Sea of Flags" at the closing ceremony of the 2014 Commonwealth Games in Glasgow.

== Background ==
On 25 March 2014, it was announced that Mauboy was chosen by SBS to represent Australia at the Eurovision Song Contest 2014, by performing as the interval act in the second semi-final. Following the announcement, Mauboy said: "Like so many Aussies, I have loved watching the show from my lounge room and now to be a part of one of the world's biggest music shows is just incredible." The decision to allow Australia to perform at Eurovision came about when its host broadcaster DR decided to reward the country's dedicated love and ongoing support of the annual event. The organisers had asked SBS, which has broadcast Eurovision in Australia for over 30 years, to choose a performer and they eventually picked Mauboy. Her appearance would mark the first time Australia has been represented at Eurovision and she would become the first solo artist from a non-European Broadcasting Union country to perform as a guest. However, Mauboy is not the first Australian to perform in the contest as Olivia Newton-John, The New Seekers and Gina G have previously taken part as competing acts representing the United Kingdom.

Mauboy told Fairfax Media that she planned to use her Eurovision exposure as a way in to tour Europe. Ahead of her performance, Mauboy revealed little about her song and even its title was kept under wraps. She did, however, mention that it was an original song written especially for her Eurovision performance and that it "would not only reflect her Indigenous heritage but resonate with the European cultures competing." Mauboy also hinted that the song would be similar in tempo to her 2013 single "To the End of the Earth". It was later revealed on 6 May 2014 that the song would be called "Sea of Flags". Following Mauboy's performance of "Sea of Flags", it was immediately released on iTunes in Australia and throughout Europe.

== Composition and recording ==
"Sea of Flags" was written in two days by Mauboy, Ilan Kidron and Stuart Crichton, and was also produced by Crichton. Musically, it is an uptempo four-chord song with a synthpop production. Its instrumentation consists of a guitar riff, a tribal drum arrangement and "synthesized" backing vocals. The introduction features backward sounds, while the final chorus of the song incorporates ad-libs and harmonies. Lyrically, "Sea of Flags" reflects Mauboy's Indigenous Australian culture and the Eurovision tradition of waving flags in support of the countries represented in the competition. Andrew Le of Renowned for Sound added that the lyrics includes lines "of a united world with colours connecting, dancing and hope." Le also noted that the tribal drum arrangement in "Sea of Flags" was a nod to Mauboy's and Australia's Indigenous heritage. He further noted that her vocals in the song's verses "are steady yet self-assured", but get higher and louder in the chorus. Mauboy spoke about the song's development in an interview for The Sydney Morning Herald, saying that "I really wanted to make it quite spiritual, quite tribal, [about] where I come from – Northern Territory, Darwin...I was feeling earthy that day, so I really wanted to make it all about my upbringing, the next generation and being a leader, someone who inspires others. There's also some ancient dreaming in there; definitely a storytelling thing."

== Reception ==
Alex Patrikios from the Australian Associated Press described "Sea of Flags" as an "upbeat anthem", while another writer from the same publication called it a "catchy tune". Sophie Joske from Out in Perth viewed "Sea of Flags" as an "inspirational dramatic pop number." Mike Wass from Idolator stated that "the song is completely over-the-top in a Eurovision-appropriate way." Andrew Le from Renowned for Sound gave "Sea of Flags" three out of five stars and noted that its "lyrics are hardly poetic, but carry a nice sentiment in lifting the spirits of listeners." Le concluded that "'Sea of Flags' is harmless radio-friendly fluff that will certainly not extend the boundaries of pop music", but admitted that he believed it was "still a better song than some of the Eurovision entries this year." For the week commencing 19 May 2014, "Sea of Flags" debuted and peaked at number 40 on the ARIA Singles Chart; it became Mauboy's nineteenth entry on that chart.

== Promotion ==
Mauboy's Eurovision performance of "Sea of Flags" was broadcast on SBS around 9:15 am on 9 May 2014, during the network's first screening of the second semi-final. The following day at 7:30 pm, SBS aired Mauboy's Road to Eurovision documentary about her Eurovision journey from Darwin to Denmark. Then at 8:30 pm, SBS aired a repeat of the second semi-final featuring Mauboy's performance. On 16 May 2014, she performed "Sea of Flags" on Sunrise from the Royal Botanic Gardens, Sydney. On 3 August 2014, Mauboy performed the song at Hampden Park in Glasgow, Scotland at the closing ceremony of the 2014 Commonwealth Games, to mark the handover of the Games from Glasgow to Gold Coast, Queensland, Australia, host of the 2018 Commonwealth Games.

=== Eurovision performance ===
Mauboy performed "Sea of Flags" to an estimated television audience of 20 million viewers on 8 May 2014 (Denmark time) / 9 May 2014 at 6:20 am (Australian time). Prior to her performance, Mauboy met with The Crown Princess Mary of Denmark and her children Prince Christian and Princess Isabella. Mary came backstage to wish her good luck and to let Mauboy know she would be attending her performance with her husband, The Crown Prince Frederik of Denmark. Mauboy's performance began with a video featuring SBS host Julia Zemiro and a group of Australians, in front of the Sydney Opera House, skyping the Eurovision organisers from a giant screen attached to the Sydney Harbour Bridge, begging to be included in the competition. The video then showed the entire Australian continent being lifted up in the air by helicopters and dropped on top of Europe, in an attempt to make Australia eligible for the competition. A group of dancers then appeared on the Eurovision stage dressed as budgie smugglers, drag queens, lifeguards, outback farmers, Sydney Swans AFL players, surfers, shearers, tennis players and giant koalas and kangaroos. The dancers performed a musical number to a song with lyrics that suggested some ways Australia could make itself at home in Europe.

As Mauboy performed, a backdrop of images of the Australian landscape appeared across the giant screens. News.com.au noted that "the crowd waved their flags and cheered her on as she strutted the enormous platform." At the end of Mauboy's performance, a man dressed as an astronaut, waving a double-sided Australian and Aboriginal flag, floated down onto the stage and uttered the words: "It's one small step for Europe, one giant leap for Australia."

Helen Davidson of The Guardian noted that Mauboy's vocals were "a little shaky at first" but commented that she was "clearly enjoying herself in front of the thousands of pop music lovers in the audience." Similarly, Al Newstead of Tone Deaf wrote it was "difficult to ignore some of the more wonky notes of Mauboy's swooping vocal lines." Newstead also believed that the "real low highlight" of her performance was the astronaut. Nastassia Baroni of Music Feeds commented that "after dusting off some initial flat notes, [Mauboy] rollicked into a high-energy performance, palpably relishing her moment as a dance diva in the global spotlight." Peter Vincent of The Sydney Morning Herald noted that she had "a nervous start and a couple of flat notes" but "quickly grew into the performance" and "even remembered to beam into the cameras and strike a few diva poses as she strutted about the stage." Vincent concluded that Mauboy's performance "was worthy of an international dance pop diva." A writer for The New Zealand Herald wrote that Mauboy's performance song was "a breath of fresh air" but wanted to know "what on earth is a sea of flags?."

Alex Patrikios of the Australian Associated Press described the performance as "typically spirited" and "infectious", while Take 40 Australia described it as "epic." News.com.au called it "stunning" and "strong" and wrote that "the much-loved pop princess may have been unknown before arriving in Copenhagen but the audience quickly embraced her as her powerful voice rang out in the massive stadium." V Music commented that Mauboy "absolutely killed it. Slaughtered it. Straight up Liam Neesoned it." V Music also noted that the dancers in the musical number were dressed as "embarrassingly obvious stereotypes" of Australia. Similarly, Sophie Joske of Out in Perth noted that the musical number featured "the most nauseatingly stereotypical Australiana the world has seen since the Sydney Olympics." Tom Mann of Faster Louder described the musical number as a "spectacularly cringe-worthy celebration of Australian clichés" and wrote that Mauboy's performance is "a proud patriotic moment for all Australians." Mike Wass of Idolator called the musical number "a hot mess" but noted that Mauboy "looked (and sounded) great" as "she saved face (and national pride) by delivering a soaring rendition" of "Sea of Flags". Aboriginal fans of Mauboy's responded positively to her performance, with one fan saying: "I guess you could say you don't have to be Neil Armstrong, we can aim for the moon too." Following her performance, Mauboy became a trending topic on Twitter in the United Kingdom.

== Track listing ==
- Digital download
1. "Sea of Flags" – 3:54

== Personnel ==
- Vocals – Jessica Mauboy
- Songwriting – Jessica Mauboy, Ilan Kidron, Stuart Crichton
- Production – Stuart Crichton
- Programmer – Stuart Crichton
- Recording engineer – Stuart Crichton
- Mixing engineer – Miles Walker
- Mastering engineer – Leon Zervos

== Charts ==
Chart (2014)	Peak position
Australia (ARIA)	40

== Release history ==
Region	Date	Format	Label
Europe	8 May 2014	Digital download	Sony Music Australia
Australia	9 May 2014	Digital download	Sony Music Australia
