= Glow (Jessica Mauboy song) =

Single by Jessica Mauboy
- Released: 5 November 2021
- Length: 3:08
- Label: Jamally / Warner Music Australia
- Songwriters: Jessica Mauboy; Cosmo and Patrick Liney; Jessica Higgs
- Producers: Cosmo's Midnight, Eric J

Jessica Mauboy singles chronology
"First Nation" (2020)	"Glow" (2021)

Music video
- "Glow" on YouTube

"Glow" is a song by Australian recording artist Jessica Mauboy. It was released on 5 November 2021 and is the first release on Warner Music, following her departure from Sony after 14 years.

In an interview with Grazia Mauboy said the song "was experimental", "a slow work-in-progress but above all, a chance to embrace a 'rollercoaster of emotions' through music", saying "From a woman's perspective, there is so much going on and I wanted that to really speak through the song. Singing the way that I am isn't like any other song I have experimented with. That to me was really exciting because I could hear the change and a point of view and a different angle that I've never journeyed into."

In November 2021, Mauboy performed the song on episode 17 of The Sound and on Sunrise. On Sunrise, Mauboy said about the change of label; "I just feel like I'm really kind of taking control. When you're an artist you always want to keep developing and working with people in different environments. Working with different people allowed me to kind of explore the ideas of being able to write and being able to express my story."

== Music video ==
The music video was directed by Ribal Hosn and released on 11 November 2021. It sees Mauboy perform among a sea of golds, reds and glitter.

== Reception ==
Tyler Jenke from Rolling Stone Australia said "Fans are being invited to witness the rebirth of Jessica Mauboy with the release of 'Glow'" saying "[it's] is equally exactly what a diehard fan would hope to hear from Mauboy, albeit with a refreshing, enchanting sheen that needs to be heard to be truly believed." Jenke called it "one of the most confidence and self-assured songs we’ve ever heard from her."

== Charts ==
Chart (2021)	Peak position
New Zealand Hot Singles (RMNZ)	40
