= Been Waiting =

Studio album by Jessica Mauboy
- Released: 22 November 2008
- Length: 42:03
- Label: Sony
- Producers: Israel Cruz; Cutfather; Jonas Jeberg; Audius Mtawarira; David Musumeci; Mick Perry

Jessica Mauboy chronology
The Journey (2007)	Been Waiting (2008)	Get 'Em Girls (2010)

Singles from Been Waiting
- 1. "Running Back" Released: 1 October 2008; 2. "Burn" Released: 17 November 2008; 3. "Been Waiting" Released: 6 March 2009; 4. "Because" Released: 12 June 2009; 5. "Up/Down" Released: 28 August 2009; 6. "Let Me Be Me" Released: 27 November 2009

Been Waiting is the debut studio album by Australian singer Jessica Mauboy, released on 22 November 2008 by Sony Music Australia. While Mauboy was still a member of the girl group Young Divas, she began to work on what became Been Waiting. She co-wrote several of the album's songs and worked with many songwriters and producers, including Israel Cruz, Cutfather, Audius Mtawarira, Michael "Fingaz" Mugisha, Kwame Holland, Jonas Jeberg and Adam Reily, among others.

Been Waiting contains mid-tempo R&B ballads and pop songs. Upon its release, the album received a positive reception from critics, with one mentioning it "sounds like an international R&B record" and another saying it was "an impressive debut". The album reached number 11 on the ARIA Albums Chart and spent a year in the ARIA top fifty. It was certified double platinum by the Australian Recording Industry Association for shipments of 140,000 copies.

The album produced five hit singles, including the lead single "Running Back" featuring American rapper Flo Rida, and the second single "Burn". The former peaked at number three on the ARIA Singles Chart and was certified double platinum, while the latter became Mauboy's first number-one hit. The title track was released as the third single, which was certified gold along with the fourth single "Because" and the fifth "Up/Down". Been Waiting earned Mauboy three nominations at the 2009 ARIA Music Awards for Best Pop Release, Breakthrough Artist - Album and Highest Selling Album. The album was promoted with live performances across Australia and received further promotion when Mauboy supported Beyoncé on the Australian leg of her I Am... World Tour.

== Background and development ==
In September 2007, it was announced that Mauboy had joined the girl group Young Divas, replacing one of the group's original members Ricki-Lee Coulter. A solo career was still very much on the cards for Mauboy, but her management saw the Young Divas as a perfect learning curve about all that was positive and negative in the music industry. Following on from the success of their single "Turn Me Loose", Mauboy began to work on her debut solo album. She began to write songs with Adam Reily, Israel Cruz, Brooke McClymont and Audius Mtawarira, as well as sourcing songs from international publishers. Following her departure from Young Divas in August 2008, it was then announced in the media on 17 September 2008 that Mauboy would be releasing her debut solo single "Running Back" in October 2008.

== Release and promotion ==
An audio sample of songs from Been Waiting was uploaded to YouTube on 6 November 2008. The album was then released through Sony Music Australia on 22 November 2008. Its iTunes release included the bonus track "Chinese Whispers". Been Waiting was released in Japan on 22 April 2009 and included four bonus tracks, two of which were remixes to "Burn" and "Running Back" as well as a new song titled "Breathe" and the iTunes bonus track "Chinese Whispers". Mauboy re-released the album as a double-disc deluxe edition on 21 August 2009. Disc one featured the standard edition's eleven tracks including seven bonus ones, whereas disc two contained a bonus DVD package of Mauboy's music videos and live performances.

In support of the album, Mauboy co-hosted The Music Jungle on 18 October 2008. She performed "Running Back" on Australian Idol on 13 October 2008, and "Burn" on 23 November 2008. She then held instore appearances in New South Wales and Adelaide in December 2008. Mauboy also performed "Running Back" and "Burn" at the Sydney New Year's Eve event on 31 December 2008. She performed several of the album's songs at the Kia Soul Live at the Chapel event held at the Paddington Uniting Church in Sydney on 9 July 2009. The album received further more promotion when Mauboy became a support act for Beyoncé on the Australian leg of her I Am... World Tour in September 2009.

== Singles ==
"Running Back" featuring Flo Rida was released as the album's lead single on 11 October 2008. Upon its release, the song received a positive reception from critics. It reached number three on the ARIA Singles Chart and was certified double platinum by the Australian Recording Industry Association for sales of more than 140,000 copies. The song received two nominations at the 2009 ARIA Music Awards, winning the award for 'Highest Selling Single'. It also won the award for 'Urban Work of the Year' at the 2009 APRA Awards. "Burn" was released as the second single on 17 November 2008. The song became Mauboy's first number one on the ARIA Singles Chart and was certified platinum for selling over 70,000 copies. It also received a nomination for 'Highest Selling Single' at the 2009 ARIA Music Awards.

The album's title track was released as the third single in March 2009. It peaked at number 12 on the ARIA Singles Chart and was certified gold for sales of more than 35,000 copies. The song received a nomination for 'Most Played Australian Work' at the 2010 APRA Awards. "Because", a pop ballad of which Mauboy says is a break-up song about an ex-boyfriend of hers, was released as the fourth single. It peaked at number nine on the ARIA Singles Chart and was certified gold. "Up/Down" was released as the fifth single on 28 August 2009. It peaked at number 11 and was certified gold. The album's sixth and final single "Let Me Be Me" was released on 27 November 2009, and peaked at number 26.

== Reception ==
=== Commercial performance ===
Been Waiting debuted at number 16 on the ARIA Albums Chart and peaked at number 11 in its ninth week on the chart. It spent a total of 59 weeks in ARIA top fifty, including nine weeks in the top twenty. The album was certified double platinum by the Australian Recording Industry Association for shipments of more than 140,000 copies.

=== Critical response ===
Professional ratings
Review scores
Source	Rating
GrooveOn	favourable
The Mercury	favourable
Sputnikmusic	3/5 stars
Planet Urban	mixed
MTV Australia	favourable

Been Waiting received positive reviews from critics. Mawunyo Gbogbo of GrooveOn described most of the album's songs as "soul-searching monologues of love gone awry" and said "Jessica Mauboy sure gives heartbreak a sweet melody". Jarrad Bevan of The Mercury said the album "sounds like an international R&B record" and that "her potential to break overseas is obvious". Davey Boy of Sputnikmusic awarded the album three out of five stars and said it was an "impressive debut which suggests that there could indeed be quality music to look forward to in the future as she matures and gains experience". Nick Bond of MTV Australia said "the whole album does stick very closely to the Timbaland blueprint of skittering beats and airy synths". Marcie of Planet Urban said "Been Waiting is the first real evidence that the girl can not only sing, but might also be able to hold her own, especially after her unsuccessful blink-and-you-missed-it stint with the Young Divas."

The album earned Mauboy several awards and nominations. It received three nominations at the 2009 ARIA Music Awards for Best Pop Release, Breakthrough Artist Album and Highest Selling Album. Been Waiting won the award for 'Album of the Year' at both the Deadly Awards and the NT Indigenous Music Awards in 2009.

== Track listing ==
No.	Title	Writer(s)	Producer(s)	Length
1.	"Running Back" (featuring Flo Rida)	Jessica Mauboy; Audius Mtawarira; Sean Ray Mullins	Audius	3:46
2.	"Been Waiting"	Mauboy; Israel Cruz; Craig Hardy	Israel	3:48
3.	"Burn"	Taj Jackson; Jonas Jeberg; Mich Hansen	Jeberg; Cutfather	2:54
4.	"Used2B"	Adam Reily; Hardy	Reily	3:45
5.	"Empty"	Mauboy; Reily	Reily	4:19
6.	"Because"	Mauboy; Dion Howell; Michael "Fingaz" Mugisha	Fingaz	4:18
7.	"To The Floor"	Mauboy; Mtawarira; Mullins	Audius	3:49
8.	"Time After Time" (Cyndi Lauper cover)	Cyndi Lauper; Rob Hyman	Audius	4:21
9.	"Back2U"	Mauboy; Reily; Brooke McClymont	Reily	3:48
10.	"Up/Down"	Kwamé Holland; Frankie Storm	Kwamé	3:26
11.	"Let Me Be Me"	Steve Robson; Karen Poole; Jade Ewen; Azi Jegbefume; Narran McLean	Fingaz	3:49

iTunes Store bonus track
No.	Title	Writer(s)	Producer(s)	Length
12.	"Chinese Whispers"	Mauboy; Anthony Egizii; David Musumeci	Egizii; Musumeci	3:28

Japanese edition bonus tracks
No.	Title	Writer(s)	Length
12.	"Breathe"	Howell; Mauboy; Mugisha	3:50
13.	"Chinese Whispers"	Egizii; Mauboy; Musumeci	3:28
14.	"Running Back (Remix)" (featuring Flo Rida and Israel Cruz)	Mauboy; Mtawarira; Mullins	4:47
15.	"Burn" (Nufirm Remix)	Hansen; Jackson; Jeberg	4:40

=== Deluxe edition ===
No.	Title	Writer(s)	Producer(s)	Length
12.	"Breathe"	Mauboy; Mugisha; Howell	Fingaz	3:47
13.	"Been Waiting" (Champion Lovers Remix)	Mauboy; Cruz; Hardy	Israel	6:29
14.	"Do It Again"	Mauboy; Mtawarira; Leon Seenandan	Audius; Seenandan	4:10
15.	"Chinese Whispers"	Mauboy; Egizii; Musumeci	Egizii; Musumeci	3:27
16.	"That Girl"	Mauboy; Mtawarira; Seenandan	Audius; Seenandan	4:08
17.	"Runnin'"	Mauboy; Egizii; Musumeci	Egizii; Musumeci	3:38
18.	"Burn" (Jason Nevins Remix)	Jackson; Jeberg; Hansen	Jeberg; Cutfather	5:54

Deluxe edition bonus DVD
No.	Title	Length
1.	"Running Back" (featuring Flo Rida – music video)
2.	"Burn" (music video)
3.	"Been Waiting" (music video)
4.	"Because" (music video)
5.	"Burn" (Australian Idol Grand Final Performance 2008)
6.	"Running Back / Been Waiting Medley" (Vodafone MTV Australia Awards 2009)
7.	"Up/Down" (Kia Soul Live at the Chapel)

== Personnel ==
Credits for Been Waiting adapted from album liner notes.

- Audius Mtawarira – arrangement, songwriter, mixing, production, vocal production
- Sean Ray Mullins – arrangement, songwriter
- Israel Cruz – songwriter, production
- Craig Hardy – songwriter, remix
- Taj Jackson – songwriter
- Jonas Jeberg – songwriter, instruments, production, programming
- Mich Hansen – songwriter, production, percussion
- Adam Reily – songwriter, production, drums, keyboard programming
- Glen Hannah – acoustic guitar
- Bryon Jones – consulting production
- Dion Howell – songwriter, vocals
- Michael "Fingaz" Mugisha – songwriter, production, instruments, mixing
- Simon Cohen – engineering, mixing
- Jessica Mauboy – vocals, songwriter
- Cyndi Lauper – songwriter
- Rob Hyman – songwriter
- Leon Seenandan – arrangement, songwriter, production, mixing
- Brooke McClymont – songwriter
- David Leslie – acoustic guitar
- David Hemming – mixing
- Kwame Holland – songwriter, production, instruments
- Frankie Storm – songwriter
- Josh "Guido" Rivera – guitar
- Steve Robson – songwriter
- Karen Poole – songwriter
- Jade Edwan – songwriter
- Azi Jegbefume – songwriter
- Narran McLean – songwriter
- Phil Tan – mixing
- Cale Storer – guitar
- Anthony Egizii – songwriter, production, programming, mixing
- David Musumeci – songwriter
- Jason Nevins – additional drum programming, additional keyboards
- Don Bartley – mastering
- Tom Coyne – mastering
- Jordan Graham – photography
- Killanoodle – artwork design
- Andrew Cameron – business affairs
- Jacqui Elmas – business affairs
- David Champion – management
- Matz Nilsson – mixing
- Mick Perry – production
- Jay Dee Springbett – A&R
- Sally Piper – A&R Administration

== Charts and certification ==
=== Weekly charts ===
Chart (2008–09)	Peak position
Australian Albums (ARIA)	11
Australian Urban Albums (ARIA)	2
Japanese Albums (Oricon)	138

=== Certification ===
Region	Certification	Certified units/sales
Australia (ARIA)	2× Platinum	140,000^{^}
^{^} Shipments figures based on certification alone.

=== Year-end charts ===
Chart (2008)	Position
ARIA Albums Chart	96
ARIA Urban Albums Chart	14
Australian Artists Albums Chart	33

Chart (2009)	Position
ARIA Albums Chart	20
ARIA Urban Albums Chart	5
Australian Artists Albums Chart	2

Chart (2010)	Position
ARIA Urban Albums Chart	18
Australian Artists Albums Chart	46

== Release history ==
Region	Date	Format	Edition(s)	Label	Catalogue
Australia	22 November 2008	CD; digital download	Standard edition	Sony Music Australia	88697471782
Japan	22 April 2009	CD; digital download	Japanese edition	Sony Music Japan	SICP-2204
Australia	21 August 2009	CD/DVD; digital download	Deluxe edition	Sony Music Australia	88697581232
