= Been Waiting (song) =

Single by Jessica Mauboy

from the album Been Waiting
- B-side: "Now I Know"
- Released: 6 March 2009
- Recorded: 2008
- Genre: Dance-pop; R&B
- Length: 3:48
- Label: Sony
- Songwriters: Israel Cruz; Craig Hardy; Jessica Mauboy
- Producer: Israel Cruz

Jessica Mauboy singles chronology
"Burn" (2008)	"Been Waiting" (2009)	"Because" (2009)

Music video
- "Been Waiting" on YouTube

"Been Waiting" is a song by Australian R&B singer Jessica Mauboy. Written with Australian singer Israel Cruz and Craig Hardy, the song was released on 6 March 2009 as the third single from Mauboy's debut album, also titled Been Waiting. The song peaked at number 12 on the ARIA Singles Chart and was certified gold by the Australian Recording Industry Association (ARIA).

== Chart performance ==
"Been Waiting" debuted on the ARIA Singles Chart at number 29 and peaked at number 12 in its fourth week on the chart. It spent a total of 14 weeks in the ARIA top fifty including eight weeks in the top twenty. "Been Waiting" was certified gold by the Australian Recording Industry Association (ARIA) for selling 35,000 copies.

== Music video ==
The music video was directed by Keri McFarlane, who had previously directed the video for "Burn". It was shot at the Cronulla sand dunes in Sydney on 23 February 2009. The video is set at night time and starts off with Mauboy walking through sand dunes, before hitting the nightclub to sing, while people in the background are dancing. It premiered on YouTube on 12 March 2009.

== Live performances ==
Mauboy performed "Been Waiting" on Rove on 22 February 2009. She also performed the song at the 2009 MTV Australia Awards on 27 March 2009. Mauboy performed the bridge from "Running Back" at the beginning of the performance, before switching to "Been Waiting". It became her first worldwide performance, of which aired on 62 channels in 162 countries via MTV. Mauboy opened the 51st TV Week Logie Awards with a performance of the song on 3 May 2009.

== Track listings ==
- Digital EP
1. "Been Waiting" – 3:48
2. "Now I Know" – 4:15
3. "Been Waiting" (Champion Lovers Remix) – 6:29
4. "Burn" (Acoustic) – 3:06
5. "Been Waiting" (Carl Remix) – 2:55
- CD single
1. "Been Waiting" – 3:48
2. "Now I Know" – 4:15
3. "Been Waiting" (Champion Lovers Remix) – 6:29
4. "Burn" (Acoustic) – 3:06

== Charts ==
=== Weekly charts ===
Chart (2009)	Peak position
Australia (ARIA)	12
Australia Urban (ARIA)	6

=== Year-end charts ===
Chart (2009)	Rank
ARIA Singles Chart	77
ARIA Urban Singles Chart	19
Australian Artists Singles Chart	11

== Certification ==
Region	Certification	Certified units/sales
Australia (ARIA)	Gold	35,000^{^}
^{^} Shipments figures based on certification alone.

== Release history ==
Region	Release date	Format	Label	Catalogue
Australia	6 March 2009	Digital download	Sony Music Australia	
Australia	14 March 2009	CD single	Sony Music Australia	88697491362
