= Because (Jessica Mauboy song) =

Single by Jessica Mauboy

from the album Been Waiting
- Released: 12 June 2009
- Recorded: 2008
- Genre: Pop; R&B
- Length: 4:12
- Label: Sony
- Songwriters: Jessica Mauboy; Dion Howell; Michael "Fingaz" Mugisha
- Producer: Fingaz

Jessica Mauboy singles chronology
"Been Waiting" (2009)	"Because" (2009)	"Up/Down" (2009)

Music video
- "Because" on YouTube

"Because" is a song by Australian R&B recording artist Jessica Mauboy. Written by Michael "Fingaz" Mugisha, Mauboy and Dion Howell, "Because" was released as the fourth single from Mauboy's debut album Been Waiting on 12 June 2009. The song is about a past relationship of Mauboy's and she has stated that it is her favourite song off the album. "Because" peaked at number nine on the ARIA Singles Chart and was certified gold by the Australian Recording Industry Association (ARIA).

== Background and chart performance ==
"Because" was written by Jessica Mauboy, Dion Howell and Michael "Fingaz" Mugisha, and was mixed by Phil Tan. Mauboy revealed that it is a break-up song about an ex-boyfriend of hers. She told The Sydney Morning Herald, "at the time it happened, I couldn't talk to anyone about it. But definitely writing it just made me feel really free." Mauboy has stated that "Because" is her favourite track off the album.

"Because" debuted and peaked at number nine on the ARIA Singles Chart, becoming Mauboy's third top ten single on the chart. It spent 11 weeks in the ARIA top fifty and was certified gold by the Australian Recording Industry Association (ARIA) for selling 35,000 copies.

== Music video ==
The music video for "Because" was directed by Mike Corte and David Murrell, and premiered on YouTube on 29 May 2009. The video opens with a drop of water evaporating from a large puddle then quickly cuts to a portrait shot of Mauboy looking towards the camera as she sings the lines, "It's all because." The next scene displays Mauboy standing on a thin layor of shallow water with pages of text individually floating in the air. Rain kicks in as it pours down on Mauboy and reoccurs throughout the video. The portrait shot also keeps recurring along with many objects falling into a puddle of water, such as a vase, a photo of Mauboy and her ex-boyfriend, and an ink container. Mauboy worked with stylist Michael Azzollini to create an ultra-glam Beyoncé-inspired look for the video.

== Track listing ==
- CD single
1. "Because" (Radio Edit) – 4:17
2. "That Girl" – 4:10
- Digital EP
1. "Because" (Radio Edit) – 4:17
2. "That Girl" – 4:10
3. "Do It Again" – 4:13

== Charts ==
=== Weekly charts ===
Chart (2009)	Peak position
Australia (ARIA)	9
Australia Urban (ARIA)	2

=== Year-end charts ===
Chart (2009)	Rank
ARIA Urban Singles Chart	25
Australian Artists Singles Chart	19

== Certification ==
Region	Certification	Certified units/sales
Australia (ARIA)	Gold	35,000^{^}
^{^} Shipments figures based on certification alone.

== Release history ==
Country	Release date	Format	Label
Australia	12 June 2009	CD, digital download	Sony Music Australia
