= Up/Down =

Single by Jessica Mauboy

from the album Been Waiting
- Released: 28 August 2009
- Recorded: 2008
- Genre: Dance-pop; R&B
- Length: 3:26
- Label: Sony
- Songwriters: Kwamé Holland; Frankie Storm
- Producer: Kwame

Jessica Mauboy singles chronology
"Because" (2009)	"Up/Down" (2009)	"Let Me Be Me" (2009)

Music video
- "Up/Down" on YouTube

"Up/Down" is a song by Australian recording artist Jessica Mauboy, taken from her debut studio album Been Waiting (2008). Written by Kwamé Holland and Frankie Storm, "Up/Down" was released as the fifth single from Been Waiting on 28 August 2009. It peaked at number 11 on the ARIA Singles Chart and was certified gold by the Australian Recording Industry Association (ARIA).

== Music video ==
The music video for "Up/Down" was shot in Los Angeles on 17 August 2009. According to a Sony Music representative, the video "explores the two sides of Jessica...The 'down' side of things will feature Jessica preparing for her shows and being the natural girl she is, whereas the 'up' will feature the showgirl in Jessica on stage, displaying her coming of age and edginess, the sexy entertainer within."

== Track listing ==
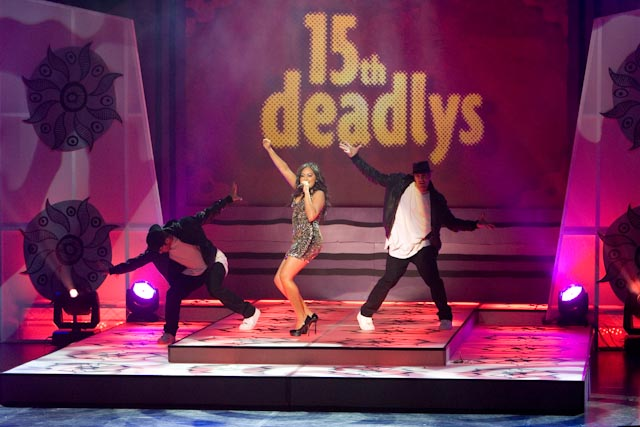
Mauboy performing "Up/Down" at the 2009 Deadly Awards

- CD single
1. Up/Down – 3:26
- Digital download
1. Up/Down – 3:26
2. Up/Down (Nufirm Remix) – 3:56

== Charts ==
=== Weekly charts ===
Chart (2009)	Peak position
Australia (ARIA)	11
Australia Urban (ARIA)	2

=== Year-end charts ===
Chart (2009)	Rank
ARIA Singles Chart	73
ARIA Urban Singles Chart	20
Australian Artists Singles Chart	10

== Certification ==
Region	Certification	Certified units/sales
Australia (ARIA)	Gold	35,000^{^}
^{^} Shipments figures based on certification alone.

== Release history ==
Country	Release date	Format	Label
Australia	28 August 2009	CD single	Sony Music Australia
Australia	28 August 2009	Digital download	Sony Music Australia
