= Gotcha (song) =

Single by Jessica Mauboy

from the album The Sapphires: Original Motion Picture Soundtrack
- Released: 13 July 2012
- Genre: Pop; swing dance
- Length: 3:08
- Label: Sony
- Songwriters: Jessica Mauboy; Louis Schoorl; Ilan Kidron
- Producer: The Schoolkids

Jessica Mauboy singles chronology
"Galaxy" (2011)	"Gotcha" (2012)	"Something's Got a Hold on Me" (2012)

Music video
- "Gotcha" on YouTube

"Gotcha" is a song recorded by Australian singer and songwriter Jessica Mauboy for the soundtrack album The Sapphires to the 2012 musical film of the same name, in which Mauboy stars as Julie McCrae. The song was written by Mauboy, Louis Schoorl and Ilan Kidron, and produced by The Schoolkids. It was released as the lead single from the soundtrack album on 13 July 2012. Musically, "Gotcha" is an upbeat pop and swing dance song, which incorporates influences of motown and elements of 1960s music.

"Gotcha" garnered positive reviews from music critics, who praised its sound. The song peaked at number 43 on the ARIA Singles Chart and number 11 on the ARIA Urban Singles Chart, and was certified gold by the Australian Recording Industry Association (ARIA). "Gotcha" earned Mauboy two nominations at the 2012 ARIA Music Awards for Best Female Artist and Best Pop Release. The accompanying music video was directed by Samuel Leighton-Dore and features Mauboy inside a recording studio performing with a band. To promote the song, Mauboy performed the song live on Sunrise and at Nickelodeon Australia's Slimefest concert.

== Background and release ==
In the 2012 musical film The Sapphires, Jessica Mauboy portrays the character of Julie McCrae, one of four Indigenous women who are discovered by a talent scout and formed into a 1960s singing group called The Sapphires, known as Australia's answer to The Supremes. The group travel to Vietnam in 1968 to sing for the US troops during the war. "Gotcha" was written by Mauboy, Louis Schoorl and Ilan Kidron, while the production was handled by The Schoolkids. They wrote the song shortly after the filming of The Sapphires was completed, and Mauboy made sure it captured "the groove and feel" of the 60s era. During an interview with National Features, she stated that "Gotcha" is one of her "all-time favourites" she has ever written and that she wanted it sound "really feisty but sexy". Mauboy revealed her thoughts about the song in an interview with Sunshine Coast Daily, saying "I'm really proud of this song, it's something really close to me and it's different to everything I have written. [...] Lyrically I'm really proud of it, and vocally it's definitely [where] I need to be". "Gotcha" was released digitally via iTunes Stores on 13 July 2012, as the lead single from The Sapphires' soundtrack album of the same name.

== Composition and reception ==
"Gotcha" is an upbeat pop and swing dance song, which incorporates influences of motown and elements of 1960s music. It also features an electric guitar sample and a "modern, cut-up pace". Miranda Cashin of Sunshine Coast Daily described the song as "a return to the Mauboy [we knew] before the infamous 2010 sexed-up fist-pumping album, Get 'Em Girls". A writer for Mix 106.5 labelled "Gotcha" as "catchy", while Thomas Gilmore of The Music Network called it "infectious". Beat magazine's Simon Ubaldi described the song as "cute", and Pop of Poprepublic.tv awarded it four stars out of five. News.com.au's Cameron Adams viewed "Gotcha" as the "highlight" of The Sapphires soundtrack and stated that it "manages to be modern and retro all at once". "Gotcha" earned Mauboy two nominations for the 2012 ARIA Music Awards in the categories of Best Female Artist and Best Pop Release. "Gotcha" debuted on the ARIA Singles Chart at number 50 on 20 August 2012. It peaked at number 43 in its third week on the chart and became Mauboy's lowest charting single at the time. "Gotcha" also appeared on the ARIA Urban Singles Chart at number 11. The song was certified gold by the Australian Recording Industry Association (ARIA), denoting sales of 35,000 copies.

== Music video and live performances ==
The accompanying music video for "Gotcha" was directed by Samuel Leighton-Dore and shot mainly in black-and-white. It premiered on Vevo on 16 July 2012. The video features Mauboy inside a recording studio performing with a band playing instruments to the song. Scenes from The Sapphires are intercut throughout the video. Adam Bub of MusicFix noted that Mauboy is "channelling a 1960s doo-woop diva" in the video and described her look as "super-hot". On 20 August 2012, she performed the song on Sunrise. Mauboy also performed "Gotcha" at Vogue magazine's Fashion's Night Out event in Sydney on 7 September 2012. She performed the song with "Inescapable" at Nickelodeon Australia's first Slimefest concert on 15 September 2012. On 14 October 2012, Mauboy performed "Gotcha" during the first live show of the second season of New Zealand's Got Talent.

== Track listing ==
- Digital download
1. "Gotcha" – 3:08

== Credits and personnel ==
Credits are taken from The Sapphires liner notes

- Ilan Kidron – songwriter
- Jessica Mauboy – songwriter, vocals
- Louis Schoorl – songwriter, mixing engineer
- The Schoolkids – producer
- Leon Zervos – mastering engineer

== Charts ==
Chart (2012)	Peak position
Australia (ARIA)	43
Australia Urban (ARIA)	11

== Certifications ==
Region	Certification	Certified units/sales
Australia (ARIA)	Gold	35,000^{^}
^{^} Shipments figures based on certification alone.

== Release history ==
Country	Date	Format	Label
Australia	13 July 2012	Digital download	Sony Music Australia
