= Running Back (Jessica Mauboy song) =

2008 single by Jessica Mauboy

Single by Jessica Mauboy featuring Flo Rida

from the album Been Waiting
- B-side: "Magical"
- Released: 1 October 2008
- Studio: The Sound Academy, Sydney, New South Wales
- Genre: R&B
- Length: 3:45
- Label: Sony
- Songwriters: Jessica Mauboy; Sean Ray Mullins; Audius Mtawarira
- Producer: Audius Mtawarira

Jessica Mauboy singles chronology
"Running Back" (2008)	"Burn" (2008)

Flo Rida singles chronology
"In the Ayer" (2008)	"Running Back" (2008)	"Cause a Scene" (2009)

Audio sample
- file; help

Music video
- "Running Back" on YouTube

"Running Back" is the debut single of Australian R&B recording artist Jessica Mauboy, featuring American rapper Flo Rida. The track was written by Mauboy, Audius Mtawarira, and Sean Ray Mullins, and was produced by Audius. "Running Back" was released for digital download on 19 September 2008 as the lead single from Mauboy's debut studio album, Been Waiting. Mauboy felt "so excited and honoured" to work with Flo Rida, calling it a dream come true.

The song peaked at number three on the ARIA Singles Chart and was certified double platinum by the Australian Recording Industry Association (ARIA), for shipments of 140,000 units. In 2009, "Running Back" won 'Highest Selling Single' at the ARIA Music Awards, where it was also nominated for 'Breakthrough Artist Single'. It also won 'Urban Work of the Year' at the APRA Awards and 'Single Release of the Year' at the NT Indigenous Music Awards. The music video was directed by Fin Edquist, and portrays a fictional relationship between Mauboy and Flo Rida. The video has garnered over 1 million views on Vevo. The song has been performed live at the 2008 Sydney New Year's Eve event and on Australian Idol, where Mauboy was a former contestant of the show in 2006.

== Background and composition ==
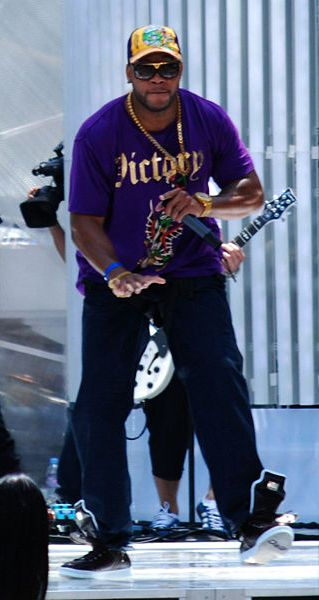
American rapper Flo Rida is a featured artist in Mauboy's debut single, "Running Back."

In September 2007, Mauboy became a member of all-girl pop group Young Divas, replacing one of the group's original members, Ricki-Lee Coulter, who had left to resume her solo career. Mauboy's management saw the group as a "perfect learning curve" about all that was positive and negative in the music industry. Together, they released their second studio album, New Attitude in November, and the album's lead single, "Turn Me Loose". After things went downhill for the group following the song's release, Mauboy went to the studio to begin working on her debut solo album Been Waiting, because she wanted to be a solo artist and it was always on her mind to become one. Mauboy began writing songs with Adam Reily, Israel Cruz, Brooke McClymont, and Audius Mtawarira. In June 2008, Mauboy told The Jakarta Post that her debut solo single would be released in August, with the album planned for a September release. Two months later, it was announced that Mauboy had left the Young Divas to resume her solo career.

"Running Back" was written by Mauboy, Mtawarira, and Sean Ray Mullins, and was produced by Audius. "Running Back" is one of the three tracks Audius produced for the album. Mullins has stated that when he hears the song on the radio, "he's merely satisfied" that it fits the formula. "Running Back" was recorded at The Sound Academy in Sydney, New South Wales, and Phil Tan mixed the track at Soapbox Studios, Atlanta, Georgia. Mauboy and Flo Rida recorded their verses in separate studios. She said that the song is based on "one of my past experiences". In an interview with Take 40 Australia, Mauboy said working with Flo Rida was a dream come true, "I love urban music and have been a huge fan of Flo-Rida's from the moment I heard 'Low'. For him to now feature on my first single I just can't believe it! I am so excited and honoured." "Running Back" is an urban pop ballad, featuring "a restrained vocal performance from Mauboy." According to Davey Boy from Sputnikmusic, the song "is one-part smooth ballad with its twinkling piano loop and lovelorn lyrics, and one-part contemporary hip hop with its deceptively slinky vocals and effective—if phoned in—Flo Rida cameo."

== Release and reception ==
"Running Back" was released for digital download on 19 September 2008. A digital extended play was released on 11 October; it includes a remix featuring Israel Cruz and a karaoke version to "Running Back", as well as two additional tracks. The CD single for "Running Back" was released in Australia on 18 October.

Jarrad Bevan from The Mercury noted that Flo Rida "ads punch to her sultry hook", and added that "it's a hit, no doubt." Mawunyo Gbogbo from Groove On wrote, "'Running Back' is not only a hot track, but it's prompted many to take notice of this fresh new face in Australian R&B." "Running Back" debuted on the ARIA Singles Chart at number thirteen and peaked at number three. Her next single, "Burn" was released in November and charted even higher when it peaked at number one. "Running Back" spent a total of thirty-one weeks on the chart. It also spent forty-five weeks on the ARIA Urban Singles Chart, where it peaked at number three. The song was certified double Platinum by the Australian Recording Industry Association (ARIA), for shipments of 140,000 units.

In 2009, "Running Back" won 'Urban Work of the Year' at the APRA Awards, and was nominated for the same category the following year. It was also nominated at the ARIA Music Awards, in the categories of 'Breakthrough Artist Single' and 'Highest Selling Single', winning the latter category on 26 November. "Running Back" also won 'Single Release of the Year' at the NT Indigenous Music Awards. At the MTV Australia Awards, "Running Back" was nominated for 'Best Collaboration'.

== Music video ==
The music video for "Running Back" was directed by Fin Edquist and filmed in Melbourne during the first week of September 2008, during Flo Rida's visit to Australia. The video starts off showing a view of the city, before Mauboy appears on the balcony of a bedroom singing the first verse. When the first chorus begins, Flo Rida is seen wandering around in a different bedroom. During the second verse, Mauboy then appears inside the bedroom looking at a photo, packing her bags, and singing in front of a mirror. During this time, Rida is also seen standing in front of a mirror in his bedroom. As the video progresses, Mauboy makes her way towards the car, and Rida then raps his verse on the telephone to her. The video ends showing Mauboy back at the balcony at the bedroom.

== Live performances ==
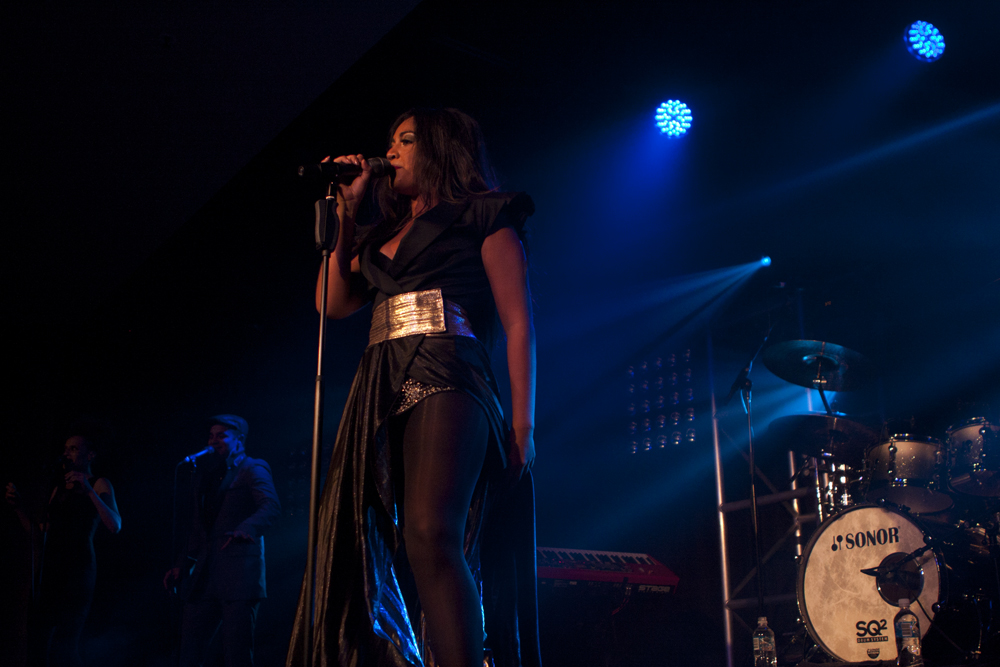
Mauboy performing at the Galaxy Tour, January 2012.

Mauboy performed "Running Back" on the elimination show of Australian Idol in October 2008, wearing a black dress and heels with her hair tied up in a bun. Mauboy was a former contestant of the show in 2006, and became runner-up to Damien Leith. She also performed the song at the 2008 Sydney New Year's Eve event. On 11 January 2009, Mauboy performed "Running Back" during a Twenty20 cricket match at the Melbourne Cricket Ground. At the 2009 MTV Australia Awards, Mauboy performed a medley of "Running Back" and "Been Waiting", which broadcast in 162 countries. She also performed "Running Back" at her first 'Live at the Chapel' concert, held at the Paddington Uniting Church in Sydney on 9 July 2009. In September 2009, Mauboy performed the song during Beyoncé's Australian leg of her I Am... World Tour, in which she served as a support act. She also became a support act for Chris Brown's Australian F.A.M.E. Tour in April 2011, and performed "Running Back". For the performance, Mauboy wore a "skin-tight black spandex ensemble with silver glittery" boots. In January 2012, Mauboy performed the song during her Galaxy Tour in Australia, dressed in a black and gold dress and silver diamond high heels. A live version of "Running Back" was included on Mauboy's extended play iTunes Session (2014).

== Track listings ==
- Digital download
1. "Running Back" featuring Flo Rida – 3:45
- Digital EP
1. "Running Back" featuring Flo Rida – 3:45
2. "Magical" – 3:26
3. "Running Back" featuring Flo Rida & Israel Cruz (Remix) – 4:47
4. "Running Back" featuring Flo Rida (Karaoke Track) – 3:47
5. "Breathe" – 3:50
- CD single
1. "Running Back" featuring Flo Rida – 3:45
2. "Magical" – 3:26
3. "Running Back" featuring Flo Rida & Israel Cruz (Remix) – 4:47
4. "Running Back" featuring Flo Rida (Karaoke Track) – 3:47

== Personnel ==
Credits are adapted from the liner notes for Been Waiting.

- Jessica Mauboy – vocals
- Audius Mtawarira – arrangement, production, vocal production
- Sean Ray Mullins – arrangement
- Flo Rida – featured vocals
- Phil Tan – mixing

== Charts ==
=== Weekly charts ===
Weekly chart performance for "Running Back"
Chart (2008)	Peak position
Australia (ARIA)	3
Australia Urban (ARIA)	3

=== Year-end charts ===
2008 year-end chart performance for "Running Back"
Chart (2008)	Position
ARIA Singles Chart	29
ARIA Urban Singles Chart	29
Australian Artists Singles Chart	4

2009 year-end chart performance for "Running Back"
Chart (2009)	Position
ARIA Urban Singles Chart	36

== Certification ==
Certifications and sales for "Running Back"
Region	Certification	Certified units/sales
Australia (ARIA)	2× Platinum	140,000^{^}
^{^} Shipments figures based on certification alone.

== Release history ==
Release dates and formats for "Running Back"
Region	Date	Format	Label	Ref.
Australia	19 September 2008	Digital download	Sony Music Australia	
New Zealand	19 September 2008	Digital download	Sony Music Australia	
Australia	11 October 2008	Digital extended play	Sony Music Australia	
Australia	18 October 2008	CD single	Sony Music Australia	
