= Amoghavarsha JS =

Indian photographer and filmmaker

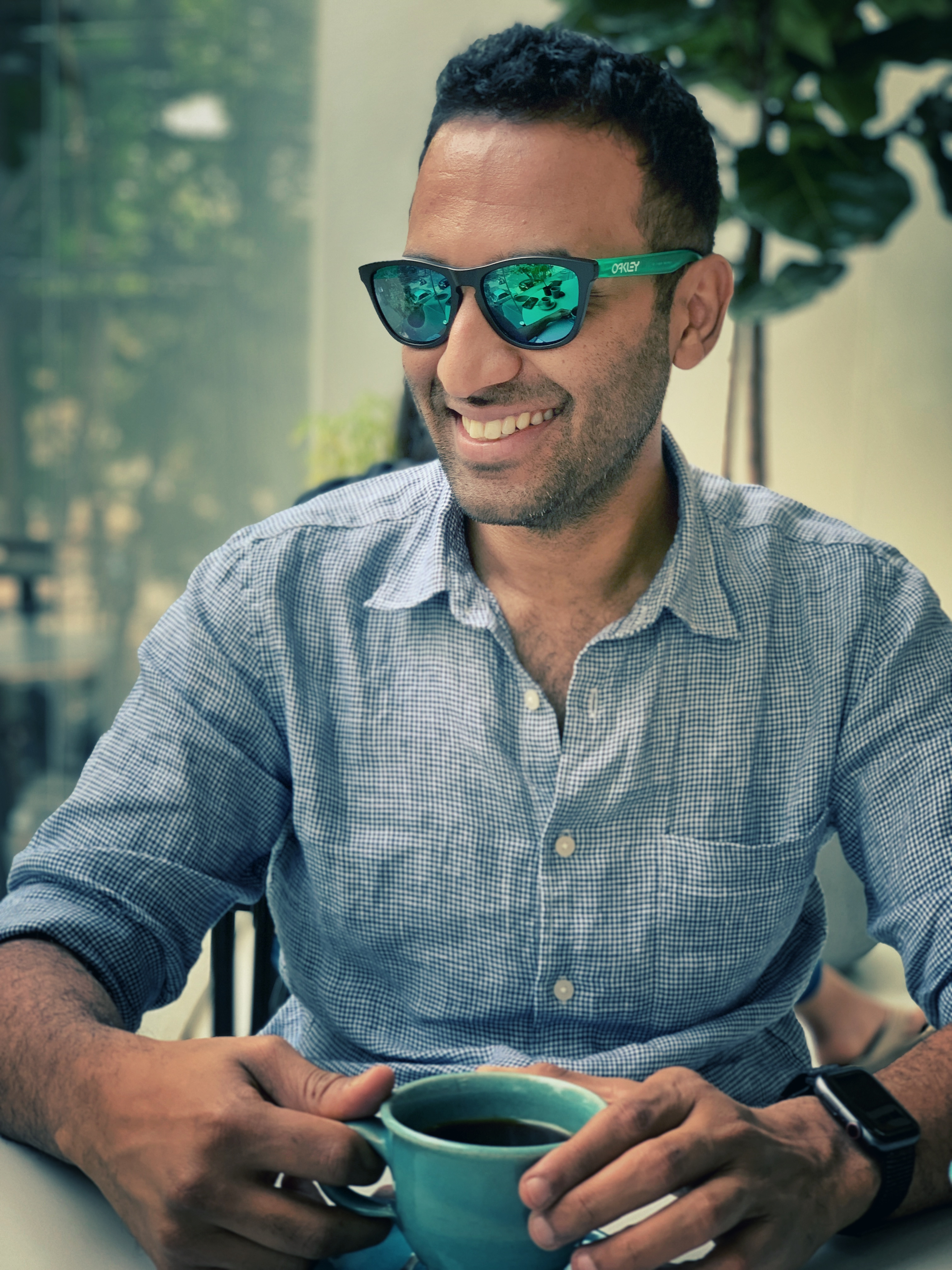
- Born: Bengaluru, India
- Education: Bachelor of Computer Science
- Occupations: Filmmaker and wildlife photographer
- Years active: 2005-present
- Website: amoghavarsha.com

Amoghavarsha JS is an Indian filmmaker, wildlife photographer, and conservationist. He is known for his work in wildlife and nature documentary filmmaking, including films such as Wild Karnataka (2019) and Gandhada Gudi (2022). Wild Karnataka explores the biodiversity of Karnataka and received two awards at the 67th National Film Awards. He also served as the art director for the album Divine Tides by Ricky Kej and Stewart Copeland, which received two Grammy Awards.

== Early life ==
Amoghavarsha was born in Bengaluru, Karnataka, India. He earned a bachelor's degree in Computer Science and began his professional career as a software engineer at Amazon. During this period, he developed an interest in wildlife photography, frequently visiting forests near Bengaluru. After two years, he joined the technology startup Asklaila as its first employee and later transitioned to a part-time programming role to focus more on photography.

== Career ==
=== Photography ===
Amoghavarsha's interest in photography developed through frequent visits to the Western Ghats, a biodiversity hotspot in southern India. He conducted photography workshops at locations such as Thekkady, Bhadra Wildlife Sanctuary, and Bannerghatta National Park, and served as a photo ambassador for a camera store in Bengaluru. He also worked part-time with Felis Creations, a wildlife production company founded by Sandesh Kadur.

In 2020, he was selected as a judge for Sony BBC Earth's photography contest, Earth in Focus. As part of the contest, he led a masterclass titled The Art of Storytelling Through Photography, focusing on visual narratives in nature photography.

=== Filmmaking ===
==== Early projects ====
Amoghavarsha began directing environmental documentaries with Kali, a film centered on the ecological importance of the Kali River in Karnataka. The film is credited with raising public awareness about the river, contributing to the renaming of the Dandeli Anshi Tiger Reserve to the Kali Tiger Reserve in 2015.

In the same year, he collaborated with composer Ricky Kej on Shanti Samsara, a musical project that combined environmental themes with visuals. The film was launched at the United Nations Climate Change Conference in Paris and officially presented by Indian Prime Minister Narendra Modi and French President François Hollande at the International Solar Alliance (ISA) event. The project featured Sanskrit verses and spoken-word contributions by individuals such as Amitabh Bachchan, Frances Fisher, and Rosanna Arquette. Many of the visuals used in the film were adapted from Kali.

==== Wild Karnataka ====
In 2021, Amoghavarsha co-directed the documentary Wild Karnataka with Kalyan Varma. Narrated by Sir David Attenborough, the film showcased the rich biodiversity of Karnataka and received two awards at the 67th National Film Awards in India: Best Exploration/Adventure Film and Best Narration/Voice Over. Music from the documentary was later adapted into the track Mother Earth on Divine Tides, an album composed by Ricky Kej and Stewart Copeland.

Amoghavarsha served as art director for Divine Tides, which received Grammy Awards at the 64th and 65th Annual Grammy Awards.

==== Gandhada Gudi ====
His 2022 documentary Gandhada Gudi (2022 film), featuring actor Puneeth Rajkumar, explored Karnataka's ecological landscapes. The film was conceived as a tribute to the 1973 film of the same name, which starred Rajkumar's father, Dr. Rajkumar. Released theatrically in October 2022, the documentary was screened both domestically and internationally. Following its 100-day theatrical run, a park in Bengaluru was renamed Gandhada Gudi Park in honor of the film and its environmental message.

==== Homecoming – The Adventure of a Green Sea Turtle ====
In 2023, Amoghavarsha's production company, Mudskipper Labs, collaborated with the Museum of Solutions (MuSo) in Mumbai to produce Homecoming – The Adventure of a Green Sea Turtle. The underwater short film addressed the impact of plastic pollution on marine ecosystems and featured narration by actors Jackie Shroff and Dia Mirza. The film became a permanent installation at MuSo and was screened at the Mumbai International Film Festival in 2024. It was named runner-up for the Wildlife Conservation Documentary Award of the Year by TOFTigers.

== Conservation work ==
Amoghavarsha has actively participated in environmental education and conservation efforts. He has conducted expeditions and field workshops throughout the Western Ghats and collaborated with the Agumbe Rainforest Research Station (ARRS) on telemetry studies of the King cobra and other ecological research.

He has also partnered with the Ministry of Environment, Forest and Climate Change (MoEFCC) on public awareness initiatives, including the Science Express – Biodiversity Special, a traveling exhibition promoting biodiversity conservation in India. Furthermore, he has contributed to the development of environmental interpretation centers in partnership with the Centre for Environment Education (CEE).

== Filmography ==
Year	Title	Role	Notes
2013	Huli: How to Save the Tiger?	Director	
2013	River Terns of Bhadra	Director	
2014	Kali	Director	Short documentary on Kali River ecosystem
2015	Jaya Hai Kannada Thaye	Director	
2015	Shanti Samsara	Director	Presented at the United Nations Climate Change Conference
2017	Indian Wildlife National Anthem	Director	
2020	Wild Karnataka	Co-director	Narrated by David Attenborough; won two National Film Awards
2022	Gandhada Gudi	Director	Feature film starring Puneeth Rajkumar; thematic sequel
2022	Divine Tides	Director	
2023	Homecoming - The Adventure Of A Green Sea Turtle	Producer	Underwater short on plastic pollution; MuSo permanent exhibit
2025	Nothing On My Mind	Director	Short film featuring the Australian High Commissioner to India Philip Green OAM
2025	Wild Mumbai †	Director	to be announced

== Awards and recognitions ==
Year	Award / Recognition	Category	Film	Result	Ref
2013	7th CMS Vatavaran Film Festival	Newcomer Award	Huli	Won	
2015	8th CMS Vatavaran Film Festival		River Terns of Bhadra	Nominated	
2016	Impact Docs	Award of Merit	Kali	Won	
2020	United Nations	Screening of Wild Karnataka on World Wildlife Day	Wild Karnataka		
2020	Wildlife Film Festival Rotterdam	Newcomer Award	Wild Karnataka	Won	
2021	67th National Film Awards	Best Exploration Film & Best Narration	Wild Karnataka	Won	
2022	Grammy Award	Best New Age Album	Divine Tides	Won	
2023	Grammy Award	Best Immersive Audio Album	Divine Tides	Won	
2024	TOFTigers	Runner Up for the Wildlife Conservation Documentary Award	Homecoming	Won	
