= 2011 Cricket World Cup schedule =

The chronological list of fixtures for the 2011 Cricket World Cup. All times local UTC+05:30 (India). Group-stage kick-off times are subject to change for television or scheduling reasons. It would be a 43-day-long tournament taking place from 19 February 2011 to 2 April 2011.

== Schedule ==
2011 World Cup schedule
Date	Time	Venue	Team 1	Team 2	Result
Warm-up matches
12 February 2011
12 February 2011	09:30	Colombo, Sri Lanka	West Indies	Kenya	West Indies won by 61 runs
12 February 2011	09:30	Colombo, Sri Lanka	Sri Lanka	Netherlands	Sri Lanka won by 156 runs
12 February 2011	14:30	Chittagong, Bangladesh	Canada	Bangladesh	Bangladesh won by 9 wickets
12 February 2011	14:30	Nagpur, India	New Zealand	Ireland	New Zealand lost by 32 runs
12 February 2011	14:30	Chennai, India	Zimbabwe	South Africa	South Africa won by 8 wickets
13 February 2011
13 February 2011	14:30	Bengaluru, India	India	Australia	India won by 38 runs
14 February 2011	No event				
15 February 2011	No event				
15 February 2011	09:30	Nagpur, India	Zimbabwe	Ireland	Ireland won by 4 wickets
15 February 2011	09:30	Colombo, Sri Lanka	Kenya	Netherlands	Netherlands won by 2 wickets
15 February 2011	14:30	Colombo, Sri Lanka	West Indies	Sri Lanka	Sri Lanka won by 4 wickets
15 February 2011	14:30	Dhaka, Bangladesh	Pakistan	Bangladesh	Pakistan won by 89 runs
15 February 2011	14:30	Bengaluru, India	Australia	South Africa	South Africa won by 7 wickets
16 February 2011
16 February 2011	09:30	Fatullah, Bangladesh	England	Canada	England won by 16 runs
16 February 2011	14:30	Chennai, India	India	New Zealand	India won by 117 runs
17 February 2011	Opening Ceremony				
18 February 2011
18 February 2011	14:30	Fatullah, Bangladesh	England	Pakistan	England won by 67 runs
Group stage matches Group A, Group B
19 February 2011
19 February 2011	14:30	Dhaka, Bangladesh	India	Bangladesh	India won by 87 runs
20 February 2011	09:30	Chennai, India	Kenya	New Zealand	New Zealand won by 10 wickets
20 February 2011	14:30	Hambantota, Sri Lanka	Sri Lanka	Canada	Sri Lanka won by 210 runs
21 February 2011	14:30	Ahmedabad, India	Australia	Zimbabwe	Australia won by 91 runs
22 February 2011	14:30	Nagpur, India	England	Netherlands	England won by 6 wickets
23 February 2011	14:30	Hambantota, Sri Lanka	Kenya	Pakistan	Pakistan won by 205 runs
24 February 2011	14:30	Delhi, India	South Africa	West Indies	South Africa won by 7 wickets
25 February 2011	09:30	Nagpur, India	Australia	New Zealand	Australia won by 7 wickets
25 February 2011	14:30	Dhaka, Bangladesh	Bangladesh	Ireland	Bangladesh won by 27 runs
26 February 2011	10:30	Colombo, Sri Lanka	Sri Lanka	Pakistan	Pakistan won by 11 runs
27 February 2011	14:30	Bengaluru, India	India	England	Match tied
28 February 2011	09:30	Nagpur, India	Zimbabwe	Canada	Zimbabwe won by 175 runs
28 February 2011	14:30	Delhi, India	West Indies	Netherlands	West Indies won by 215 runs
1 March 2011	14:30	Colombo, Sri Lanka	Sri Lanka	Kenya	Sri Lanka won by 9 wickets
2 March 2011	14:30	Bengaluru, India	England	Ireland	Ireland won by 3 wickets
3 March 2011	09:30	Mohali, India	South Africa	Netherlands	South Africa won by 231 runs
3 March 2011	14:30	Colombo, Sri Lanka	Pakistan	Canada	Pakistan won by 46 runs
4 March 2011	09:30	Ahmedabad, India	New Zealand	Zimbabwe	New Zealand won by 10 wickets
4 March 2011	14:30	Dhaka, Bangladesh	Bangladesh	West Indies	West Indies won by 9 wickets
5 March 2011	14:30	Colombo, Sri Lanka	Sri Lanka	Australia	Match abandoned due to rain.
6 March 2011	09:30	Chennai, India	England	South Africa	England won by 6 runs
6 March 2011	14:30	Bengaluru, India	India	Ireland	India won by 5 wickets
7 March 2011	14:30	Delhi, India	Kenya	Canada	Canada won by 5 wickets
8 March 2011	14:30	Kandy, Sri Lanka	New Zealand	Pakistan	New Zealand won by 110 runs
9 March 2011	14:30	Delhi, India	India	Netherlands	India won by 5 wickets
10 March 2011	14:30	Kandy, Sri Lanka	Sri Lanka	Zimbabwe	Sri Lanka won by 139 runs
11 March 2011	09:30	Mohali, India	West Indies	Ireland	West Indies won by 44 runs
11 March 2011	14:30	Chittagong, Bangladesh	England	Bangladesh	Bangladesh won by 2 wicketsENG
12 March 2011	14:30	Nagpur, India	India	South Africa	South Africa won by 3 wickets
13 March 2011	09:30	Mumbai, India	New Zealand	Canada	New Zealand won by 97 runs
13 March 2011	14:30	Bengaluru, India	Australia	Kenya	Australia won by 60 runs
14 March 2011	09:30	Chittagong, Bangladesh	Bangladesh	Netherlands	Bangladesh won by 6 wickets
14 March 2011	14:30	Kandy, Sri Lanka	Pakistan	Zimbabwe	Pakistan won by 7 wickets
15 March 2011	14:30	Kolkata, India	Ireland	South Africa	South Africa won by 131 runs
16 March 2011	14:30	Bengaluru, India	Australia	Canada	Australia won by 7 wickets
17 March 2011	14:30	Chennai, India	England	West Indies	England won by 18 runs
18 March 2011	09:30	Kolkata, India	Ireland	Netherlands	Ireland won by 6 wickets
18 March 2011	14:30	Mumbai, India	New Zealand	Sri Lanka	Sri Lanka won by 112 runs
19 March 2011	09:30	Dhaka, Bangladesh	Bangladesh	South Africa	South Africa won by 206 runs
19 March 2011	14:30	Colombo, Sri Lanka	Australia	Pakistan	Pakistan won by 4 wickets
20 March 2011	09:30	Kolkata, India	Kenya	Zimbabwe	Zimbabwe won by 161 runs
20 March 2011	14:30	Chennai, India	India	West Indies	India won by 80 runs
21 March 2011	No event				
22 March 2011	No event				
Knockout stage matches
23 March 2011
23 March 2011	14:30	Dhaka, Bangladesh	West Indies	Pakistan	Pakistan won by 10 wickets
24 March 2011	14:30	Ahmedabad, India	India	Australia	India won by 5 wickets
25 March 2011	14:30	Dhaka, Bangladesh	New Zealand	South Africa	New Zealand won by 49 runs
26 March 2011	14:30	Colombo, Sri Lanka	Sri Lanka	England	Sri Lanka won by 10 wickets
27 March 2011	No event				
28 March 2011	No event				
29 March 2011	14:30	Colombo, Sri Lanka	Sri Lanka	New Zealand	Sri Lanka won by 5 wickets
30 March 2011	14:30	Mohali, India	India	Pakistan	India won by 29 runs
31 March 2011	No event				
1 April 2011	No event				
2 April 2011	14:30	Mumbai, India	India	Sri Lanka	India won by 6 wickets
