= Manje Gowda =

Indian educationist and philanthropist

Dr. Manje Gowda
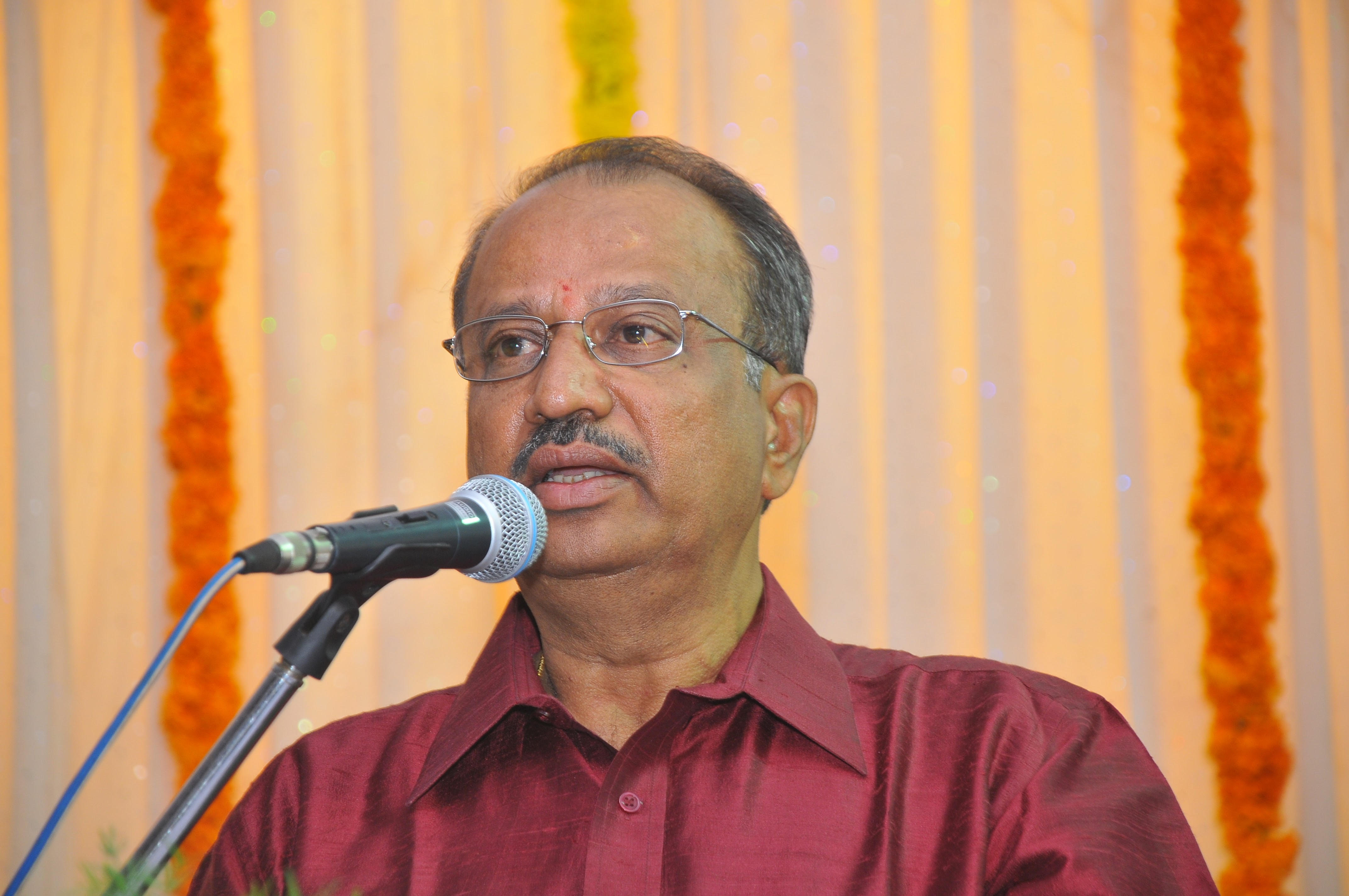
- Born: 27 November 1953 (age 72)
- Education: Indian Institute of Science
- Occupation: Educationist
- Organization: Vidya Soudha Group of Institutions

Manje Gowda is an Indian educationist and philanthropist based in Bangalore, India. He is the co-founder and chairman of Vidya Soudha Group of Institutions and Managing Trustee of Sri Manjunatha Seva Trust which runs educational institutions in Bangalore, Hassan and Mysore districts in the southern Indian state of Karnataka.

== Early life and education ==
Gowda was born in Ankanahally village near Gorur in Hassan, Karnataka. He is married to H. S. Sudha, daughter of former minister H. C. Srikantaiah, and they have two sons. He completed his Bachelor of Engineering from Malnad College of Engineering, a master's degree in engineering from Indian Institute of Science and an MBA from Bangalore University. He later went on to complete PhD from Indian Institute of Science at the Faculty of Engineering. He served in Government of Karnataka starting his career in Karnataka Public Works Department and went on to become the General Manager of Karnataka State Financial Corporation until his retirement in 2014.

== Social activities ==
Gowda is currently involved in several activities in promoting education, sports and business. Apart from serving as chairman of Vidya Soudha Group Of Institutions he is currently serving as the vice-president of Karnataka Olympic Association, President of Karnataka Amateur Boxing Association and Zonal Secretary of Boxing Federation of India. He had previously served as president, Bengaluru Management Association (BMA), Chairman of Export Promotion Council For EOUs & SEZs (EPCES), Regional Governing Council, Cochin and Director on the board of Bangalore Water Supply and Sewerage Board (BWSSB).
