= Wild Tamil Nadu =

2025 documentary film

- Poster of Wild Tamil Nadu
- Directed by: Kalyan Varma; Akhilesh Thambe (Co Director)
- Produced by: Sundaram Fastners Limited; Arathi Krishna; Rohit Varma
- Narrated by: Arvind Swamy
- Cinematography: Kalyan Varma; Suman Raju; Dhanu Paran; Pradeep Hegde
- Edited by: Akhilesh Thambe (Editor and Co Director); George Thengummoottil (Additional Editor)
- Music by: Ricky Kej
- Production company: Nature InFocus
- Release date: 16 October 2025 (Chennai)
- Running time: 60 minutes
- Country: India
- Languages: English; Tamil

Wild Tamil Nadu is a 2025 wildlife documentary film about wildlife of the Indian state of Tamil Nadu. It is directed by Kalyan Varma and produced by Arathi Krishna. The film is narrated by Tamil actor Aravind Swamy and music is composed by Grammy Award winner Ricky Kej. The film was produced under the corporate social responsibility of Sundram Fastners Limited. The film premiered on 16 October 2025 at PVR Satyam Theatres, Chennai. The film will be released in theatres on 7th September 2026.

== Plot ==
The story was inspired by the ancient Tamil Sangam literature, the film explores the region through its five classical landscapes — mountains (Kurinji), forests (Mullai), croplands (Marutham), arid zones (Palai), and coasts (Neithal).

== Production ==
The film was crafted over a span of five years, with a team of dedicated cinematographers from India capturing the diverse landscapes Tamil Nadu. Filming locations include Anamalai Tiger Reserve, Mudumalai National Park, Pulicat Lake Bird Sanctuary, Palk Bay, Teri (geology), Pichavaram, Point Calimere Wildlife and Bird Sanctuary, Marina Beach and other locations.

The film was notable in filming the elusive Madras hedgehog and cooperative fishing of cormorants for the first time ever.

Year	Filmfestival
2026	Wildscreen Panda Awards (Sustainability Award)
2026	International Wildlife Film Festival
