= The Day Before I Met You =

Single by Jessica Mauboy

from the album Beautiful: Platinum Edition
- Released: 13 February 2015
- Recorded: Brandon's Way Recording Studios (Los Angeles, California)
- Genre: Pop
- Length: 3:33
- Label: Sony
- Songwriters: Antonio Dixon; Kenneth "Babyface" Edmonds; Khristopher Riddick-Tynes; Helen Jane Culver; Jessica Mauboy
- Producers: Antonio Dixon; Kenneth "Babyface" Edmonds; The Rascals

Jessica Mauboy singles chronology
"Spirit of the Anzacs" (2015)	"The Day Before I Met You" (2015)	"This Ain't Love" (2015)

Music video
- "The Day Before I Met You" on YouTube

"The Day Before I Met You" is a song by Australian recording artist Jessica Mauboy from the platinum edition of her third studio album, Beautiful. It was released on 13 February 2015 as the album's sixth overall single and the second single from the platinum edition. "The Day Before I Met You" was written by Antonio Dixon, Kenneth "Babyface" Edmonds, Khristopher Riddick-Tynes, Helen Jane Culver and Mauboy. Dixon and Edmonds also produced the song with The Rascals. "The Day Before I Met You" is a pop love song which features an acoustic guitar riff and "very low pitched" vocals in its verses. Lyrically, Mauboy sings about "not wanting to go back to a time before that special someone was in her life".

Upon its release, "The Day Before I Met You" debuted at number 41 on the Australian ARIA Singles Chart. An accompanying music video was directed by Nick Waterman and filmed in Mauboy's hometown of Darwin, Northern Territory. It features appearances by her parents, sisters and grandmother. Children from the Aboriginal communities of Kulaluk and Bagot also appear in the video. Mauboy performed "The Day Before I Met You" at the 2015 ICC Cricket World Cup opening ceremony and on the Today show live at Uluru. She also promoted the single's release on social media and during radio interviews.

== Production and composition ==
"The Day Before I Met You" was written by Antonio Dixon, Kenneth "Babyface" Edmonds, Khristopher Riddick-Tynes, Helen Jane Culver, and Jessica Mauboy. It was produced by Dixon, Edmonds and The Rascals. The song was recorded and mixed by Paul Boutin at Brandon's Way Recording Studios in Los Angeles, California. The mastering was done by Leon Zervos at Studios 301 in Sydney. Eric Jackson provided the guitars for the song. "The Day Before I Met You" is a pop love song with an acoustic guitar riff and "very low pitched" vocals in the verses. Lyrically, it is about Mauboy "not wanting to go back to a time before that special someone was in her life". During the chorus, she sings: "What did I do without you here / How did I breathe when you're my air / If I had a time machine I would never go back / to the day before I met you." Kirsten Maree of Renowned for Sound noted that the chorus has a "soft melody". According to Mauboy, "The Day Before I Met You" also has another meaning, "[It's] about my own journey in life and reflects on my family and loved ones as well as the people, the lifestyle, the spirit & soul of my hometown of Darwin."

== Release and reception ==
Mauboy's manager David Champion revealed to the Northern Territory News on 20 January 2015 that "The Day Before I Met You" would be the next single from her third studio album Beautiful. The single's artwork, which was taken by Darren McDonald, was revealed on Mauboy's Instagram account on 4 February 2015. "The Day Before I Met You" was released physically on 13 February 2015 as the sixth overall single from Beautiful, and the second single from the album's platinum edition. The physical release features an acoustic version of the album's previous single "Can I Get a Moment?". An acoustic version of "The Day Before I Met You" was released digitally on 13 March 2015.

Scoopla described "The Day Before I Met You" as a "touching track". Renowned for Sound's Kirsten Maree gave the song three stars out of five and described it as a "simple and sweet" track with a "cute" chorus. However, Maree would have preferred to see Mauboy "drop the effects, ditch the echoes, overdone vocal displays and any hint of synth, and just stand and deliver a lovely, simple song." She felt "The Day Before I Met You" would have been "the perfect chance" for that to happen but "unfortunately it's suffered from too much production". For the week dated 23 February 2015, "The Day Before I Met You" debuted and peaked at number 41 on the Australian ARIA Singles Chart. It became Mauboy's twentieth top fifty and twenty-first top one hundred chart entry.

== Music video ==
=== Background ===
The music video was directed by Nick Waterman and produced by James Saunders. Mauboy served as the creative director and Zoë White was the cinematographer. The clip was filmed in Mauboy's hometown of Darwin with her family and friends involved. It features appearances by Mauboy's parents Ferdy and Therese, her sisters Cathy, Jenny, Sandra and Sophia, and her grandmother Harriett. Children from the Aboriginal communities of Kulaluk and Bagot also appear in the video after permission was sought from local elders. Mauboy said filming in Darwin was a dream come true for her. Describing the concept of the video on his official website, Waterman stated, "Set against the backdrop of the astonishing tropical beauty of Darwin and the vibrant culture of its local community, 'The Day Before I Met You' depicts Jessica Mauboy like she's never been seen before. Interwoven with a series of real human vignettes that are marked by feelings of celebration, harmony, community and love, the video captures the magical and authentic essence of Jess returning home." The video premiered on 13 February 2015. A behind-the-scenes look at the clip was released exclusively by Scoopla on the same day.

=== Synopsis and reception ===
The majority of the video features Mauboy singing and dancing against the wall of a pink building and also on the streets surrounded by her family and friends. Several other scenes show Mauboy at the beach, sitting on grass and riding a bike down a quiet suburban street. During scenes inside the house she grew up in, Mauboy is seen sitting on the ground with her head resting on the side of her grandmother. During another scene in the house, Mauboy and her parents are seen sitting on a couch and smiling to the camera. Scenes of children dancing, swimming and playing sport are also featured throughout. The video ends with Mauboy riding a bike while singing the last few lines of the song a cappella. Spotlight Report described the clip as "beautiful", while Josh from Scoopla called it a "touching video". Damian of Auspop wrote that Mauboy has "made no secret of the fact that she's incredibly proud of where she's come from" and felt that the video was "a long-overdue tribute". Lanaé Mc'Levans of Sinuous magazine described it as a fun and "vibrant clip".

== Promotion ==
Mauboy performed "The Day Before I Met You" at the ICC Cricket World Cup opening ceremony held on 12 February 2015 at the Sidney Myer Music Bowl in Melbourne. Mauboy also promoted "The Day Before I Met You" with radio interviews on The Dan & Maz Show and Fitzy and Wippa on 17 February 2015. She performed the song on the Today show live at Uluru on 9 March 2015.

== Track listing ==
- CD single
1. "The Day Before I Met You" – 3:33
2. "Can I Get a Moment?" (Acoustic) – 3:20
- Digital download
1. "The Day Before I Met You" (Acoustic) – 3:56

== Credits and personnel ==
Credits adapted from the liner notes of Beautiful: Platinum Edition.

Locations

- Recorded at Brandon's Way Recording Studios in Los Angeles, California.
- Mastered at Studios 301 in Sydney.

Personnel

- Songwriting – Antonio Dixon, Kenneth "Babyface" Edmonds, Helen Jane Culver, Jessica Mauboy
- Production – Antonio Dixon, Kenneth "Babyface" Edmonds, The Rascals
- Recording and mixing engineer – Paul Boutin
- Guitars – Eric Jackson
- Mastering – Leon Zervos

== Charts ==
Chart (2015)	Peak position
Australia (ARIA)	41

== Release history ==
Country	Date	Format	Version(s)	Label
Australia	13 February 2015	CD single	Main version	Sony Music Australia
Australia	13 March 2015	Digital download	Acoustic version	Sony Music Australia
