= Kalyan Varma =

Bangalore wildlife filmmaker

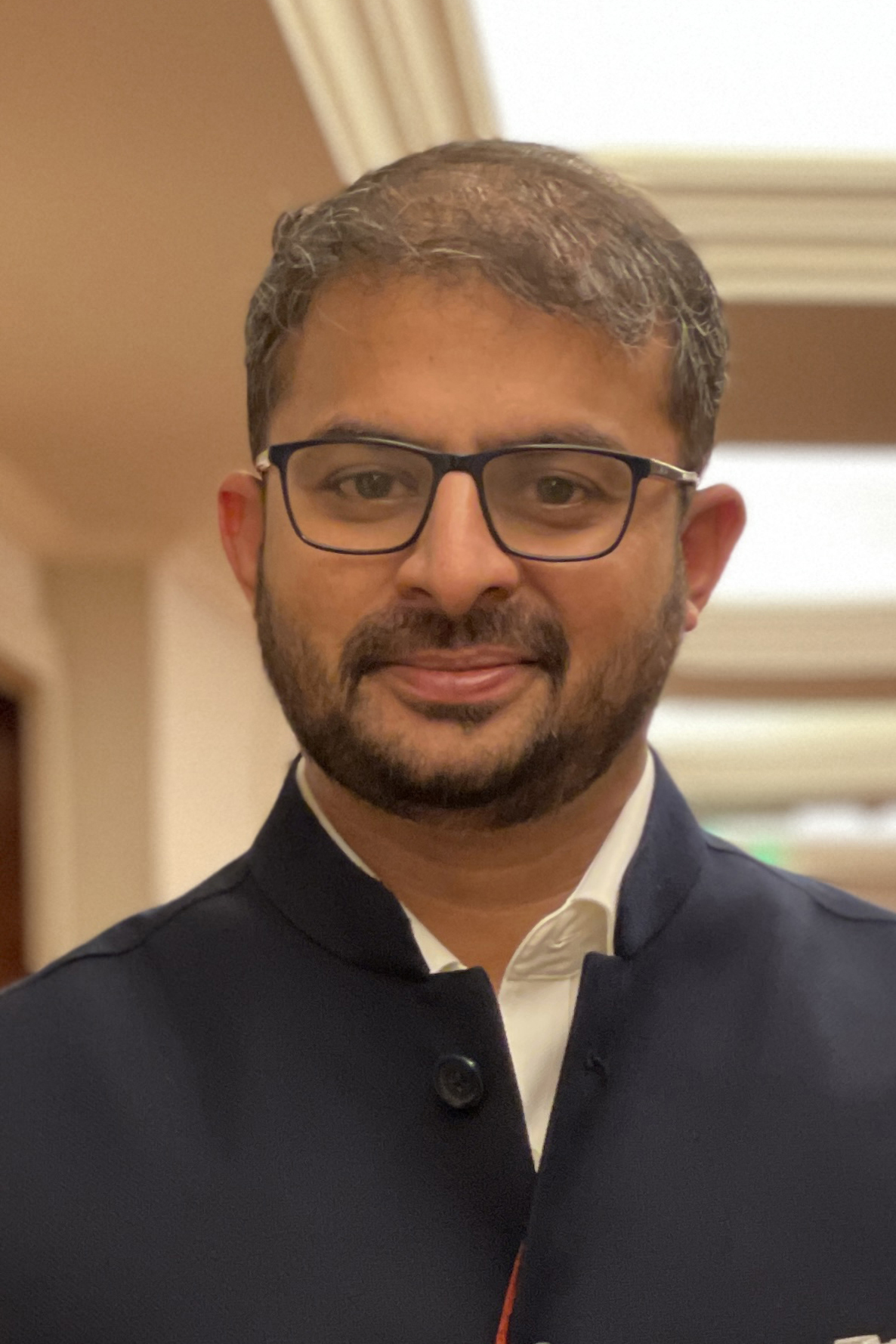
- Kalyan Varma
- Born: Bangalore
- Occupations: Photojournalist, Filmmaker
- Known for: Co-founder of India Nature Watch, Nature InFocus, Peepli Project
- Website: https://www.kalyanvarma.net

Kalyan Varma is a Emmy nominated wildlife filmmaker, photographer and conservationist. based in India. Over the last 20 years, he has been documenting the beauty of nature as well as the plight of environment in India.

He is one of the founders of Peepli Project, co-director of Nature InFocus nature and wildlife festival, and founding member of India Nature Watch. He currently freelances with BBC Natural History, Netflix, Discovery Channel, National Geographic and Disney+, and also works with grassroots NGOs like Nature Conservation Foundation to highlight environmental issues in India. He is a recipient of the 67th National film award in 2021 for his film Wild Karnataka and Carl Zeiss Wildlife Conservation Award. He has recently released his next blue-chip documentary Wild Tamil Nadu.

== Early life ==
Kalyan was born on January 13, 1980 in Vizag. He studied mechanical engineering from PES University. In college years, he was active in open-source software and Linux communities in India and was active in pushing these technologies in the society. He was part of the team which distributed linux operating system free to people across India. He was one of the core members of the annual conference FOSS.IN.

After college, he joined Yahoo! in 2001. Kalyan was one of the early employees of their centre in India. He headed the application security division of Yahoo, where he would oversee the use of cryptography and secure web application across the web portal. He won the superstar award in Yahoo, given to ten employees globally each year. He and his team were the first to introduce Captcha tech to the world.

At the end of 2004 he quit his job in order to pursue nature photography. He worked in Biligiriranga Hills for more than a year before he took up full time wildlife photography and filmmaking as a profession.

== Nature Community initiatives ==
Kalyan is involved in fostering community among photographers and wildlife conservationists since his early years.

In 2004 he, along with a team of photographers, founded India Nature watch, an online community which now has become the largest platform for wildlife photographers in Asia. This community was involved in pushing conservation of wildlife in India via visual media.

In 2015, he co-founded the slow-journalism initiative the Peepli project, which delves deep into the unreported, under-reported, themes that public discourse currently abdicates. Kalyan undertook a year long project to document human-elephant conflict in Karnataka and the relationship that shepherds share with arid regions of India. His work on elephants was instrumental in better policies in managing elephant conflict.

He is one of the co-founders of Nature InFocus, an annual festival, portal, contest and a documentary production company which is one of the largest in the world, focussed on nature photography and conservation.

Kalyan is best known for directing and producing the film Wild Karnataka which was the first nature film to be released in Cinema in India.

== Wildlife documentaries ==
Kalyan has in the last decade dedicated himself to make wildlife documentaries. He has made various wildlife documentaries for the BBC and National Geographic Channel.

- 2008 BBC The Mountains of the Monsoon
- 2009 BBC One million snake bites
- 2011 National Geographic Secrets of Wild India
- 2012 BBC Life Story (TV series)
- 2014 BBC Wonders of the Monsoon
- 2015 BBC India: Natures Wonderland
- 2017 ORF Sky River: Brahmaputra
- 2017 BBC Big Cats
- 2019 Wild Karnataka (2019 film)
- 2019 Netflix Our planet
- 2020 BBC Primates
- 2021 Netflix Attenborough Life in Colour
- 2021 David Attenborough: A Life On Our Planet
- 2022 ITV A Year on Planet Earth
- 2023 Disney+ Secrets of the Elephants
- 2023 Project Tiger
- 2024 Disney+ Tiger (2024 film)
- 2024 Disney+ Tigers on the Rise
- 2025 Wild Tamil Nadu

== Awards ==
- 2015 Sanctuary Asia - Wildlife photographer of the year
- 2013 NHM photographer of the year - Biological Realms
- 2015 Asferico international nature photography contest
- 2015 Por el Planeta - First place in Animal Behaviour
- 2017 Carl Zeiss Wildlife Conservation award
- 2021 India National film award
