= National Film Award for Best Narration / Voice Over =

Indian film award

- National award for contributions to non-feature film
- Sponsored by: National Film Development Corporation of India
- Rewards: Rajat Kamal (Silver Lotus); ₹2,00,000
- First award: 2003
- Most recent winner: Harikrishnan S, The Sacred (2023)

The National Film Award for Narration / Voice Over is one of the National Film Awards given by the National Film Development Corporation of India for the non-feature films. It was instituted in 2003 and awarded at 51st National Film Awards.

Films made in any Indian language shot on 16 mm, 35 mm or in a wider gauge or digital format and released on either film format or video/digital but certified by the Central Board of Film Certification as a documentary/newsreel/fiction are eligible for non-feature film section.

== Awards ==
All the awardees are awarded with 'Silver Lotus Award (Rajat Kamal)' and cash prize of ₹2 lakh (US$2,100). Following are the winners over the years:

List of award recipients, showing the year (award ceremony), film(s) and language(s)
Year	Recipient(s)	Film(s)	Language(s)	Refs.
2003 (51st)	Balachandran Chullikkadu	The 18 Elephants – 3 Monologues	Malayalam	
2004 (52nd)	Yang Yen Thaw	The Legend of Fat Mama	English	
2005 (53rd)	Ajay Raina	Wapsi	English, Hindi, Urdu, Punjabi and Kashmiri	
2006 (54th)	Nedumudi Venu	Minukku	Malayalam	
2007 (55th)	Vani Subramanian	Ayodhya Gatha	English and Hindi	
2008 (56th)	Elangbam Natasha	Sana Keithel	English	
2009 (57th)	Ranjan Palit	In Camera	English	
2010 (58th)	Nilanjan Bhattacharya	Johar : Welcome to Our World	Hindi and English	
2011 (59th)	Ann Abraham	Just that Sort of a Day	English	
2012 (60th)	Moni Bordoloi	Suranjana Deepali	Assamese	
2013 (61st)	Lipika Singh Darai	Kankee O Saapo	Odia	
2014 (62nd)	Ambooty (Anil Kumar)	Nitya Kalyani – Oru Mohiniyattam Patham	Malayalam	
2014 (62nd)	Devi S.	Nitya Kalyani – Oru Mohiniyattam Patham	Malayalam	
2015 (63rd)	Harish Bhimani	Mala Laj Watat Nahai	Marathi, Hindi and English	
2015 (63rd)	Aliyaar	Arangile Nithya Vismayam Guru Chemancherry Kunhiraman Nair	Malayalam	
2016 (64th)	Setsu Makino Togawa	Makino An Indian Haiku	English	
2017 (65th)	Francois Castellino	The Lion of Laddak		
2018 (66th)	Deepak Agnihotri	Madhubani – The Station of Colours		
2018 (66th)	Urvija Upadhayay	Madhubani – The Station of Colours		
2019 (67th)	David Attenborough	Wild Karnataka	English	
2020 (68th)	Shobha Tharoor Sreenivasan	Rhapsody of Rains – Monsoons of Kerala	English	
2021 (69th)	Kulada Kumar Bhattacharjee	Hati Bondhu	English and Assamese	
2022 (70th)	Sumant Shinde	Murmurs of the Jungle	Marathi	
2023 (71st)	Harikrishnan. S	The Sacred – Jack Exploring the Tree of Wishes	English	
2024 (72nd)	Soundarya Jayachandran	Little Planet: A Tale of Frogs	English	
