= Gandhada Gudi (2022 film) =

Kannada language film by Amoghavarsha JS

- Poster
- Directed by: Amoghavarsha JS
- Written by: Amoghavarsha JS; Sampath sirimane Kiran Kumar KR; Srinivash Kashyap S
- Produced by: Ashwini Puneeth Rajkumar
- Starring: Puneeth Rajkumar; Amoghavarsha JS
- Cinematography: Pratheek Shetty
- Edited by: Ankith JK; Akshay J Pai; Pratheek Shetty
- Music by: B. Ajaneesh Loknath
- Production companies: PRK Productions; Mudskipper
- Release date: 28 October 2022
- Running time: 97 minutes
- Country: India
- Language: Kannada

Gandhada Gudi (transl. The abode of Sandalwood) is a 2022 Indian Kannada-language docudrama film directed by Amoghavarsha JS. It stars himself and Puneeth Rajkumar in lead roles. The film features the final appearance of actor Puneeth Rajkumar, and derives its title from the 1973 Kannada film of the same name, starring his father Dr. Rajkumar. The film released on 28 October 2022.

== Premise ==
Puneeth Rajkumar, who is also known to be an avid travel and adventure buff, decides to explore Karnataka's rich bio-diversity, for which he teams up with the award-winning wildlife filmmaker Amoghavarsha JS. Together, they embark on a journey across the length and breadth of the state, where they come across a visual spectacle of hidden gems.

== Cast ==
- Puneeth Rajkumar as himself
- Amoghavarsha JS as himself
- Ashwini Puneeth Rajkumar as herself

== Music ==
The music of the film was composed by B. Ajaneesh Loknath.

Gandhada Gudi

Soundtrack album by B. Ajaneesh Loknath
- Released: 10 November 2022
- Recorded: 2021–22
- Genre: Feature Film soundtrack
- Length: 16:53
- Language: Kannada
- Label: PRK Audio
- Producers: Bobby C.R. B. Ajaneesh Loknath

B. Ajaneesh Loknath chronology
| Kantara (2022) | Gandhada Gudi (2022) | Banaras (2022) |

Official audio

| No. | Title | Lyrics | Singer(s) | Length |
|---|---|---|---|---|
| 1. | "Gandhada Gudi (Reprise)" | Chi. Udayashankar | Vijay Prakash | 3:35 |
| 2. | "Kaavalugaara" | Amoghavarsha, Kiran Kaverappa | Sanjith Hegde | 3:24 |
| 3. | "Alemaari Jothi" | Kiran Kaverappa | Naveen Sajju | 1:49 |
| 4. | "Aleya Kare (Male)" | Amoghavarsha, Kiran Kaverappa | B. Ajaneesh Loknath | 3:17 |
| 5. | "Aleya Kare (Female)" | Amoghavarsha, Kiran Kaverappa | C. R. Bobby | 4:48 |
| Total length: | | | | 16:53 |

== Release ==
The film released on 28 October 2022. The first weekend collection was reported to have crossed that of Kantara for the same period.

Reception

A critic from The News Minute wrote that "For the fans of the late actor, the film is the perfect farewell because they get to experience and soak up Puneeth's unembellished, innocent charm as he sheds his Powerstar image without any qualms". A critic from Bangalore Mirror wrote that "Gandhada Gudi is worth a watch for those who want to know about the important places of Karnataka. This film will actually take you there".

Home Media

The digital rights of the film were secured by Amazon Prime Video, and was digitally streamed from 17 March 2023 on the occasion of birth anniversary of Puneeth Rajkumar. The movie satellite rights was acquired by Zee Kannada and premiered on 29 October 2023.
