= Wild Karnataka =

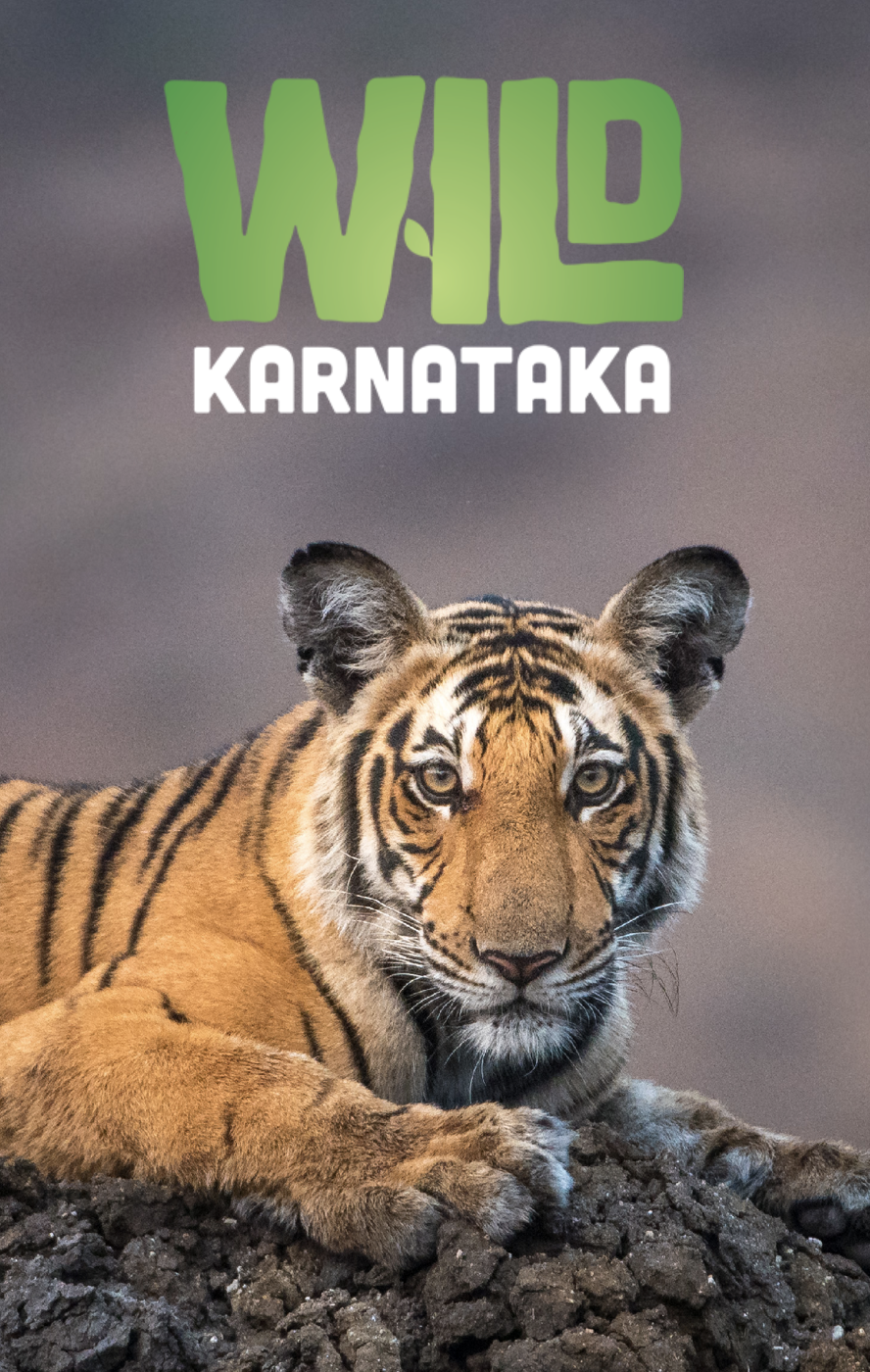
- Theatrical poster
- Directed by: Amoghavarsha JS; Kalyan Varma; Sharath Champati; Vijay Mohan Raj IFS
- Produced by: Amoghavarsha JS; Kalyan Varma; Sharath Champati; Vijay Mohan Raj IFS
- Narrated by: Sir David Attenborough
- Edited by: Adam Kirby
- Music by: Ricky Kej
- Production companies: Icon Films; Mudskipper
- Distributed by: PVR Pictures
- Release dates: 3 March 2019 (Bangalore, India); 17 January 2020
- Country: India
- Language: English

Wild Karnataka is a 2019 Indian natural history documentary about the wildlife of the state of Karnataka.Produced by Amoghavarsha JS and Kalyan Varma in collaboration with Icon Films and Mudskipper,the film has Nicholas Gates as edit producer, narration by Sir David Attenborough, music by Grammy Award winner Ricky Kej and editing by Adam Kirby.

The film was premiered on 3 March 2019 before an audience of about 3,000 at an open-air theatre at Palace Grounds in Bangalore, and was screened at the United Nations headquarters headquarters the same day, on World Wildlife Day. It was later theatrically released on 17 January 2020, through PVR Cinemas, thus becoming the first Indian wildlife-based film to be screened in theatres; and was also premiered through Discovery India's multiple television channels and the streaming service Discovery+ on 5 June 2020 with its dubbed versions being released the same day.Reviews praised the photography, while some critics faulted the film for showing a wilderness without people and for saying nothing about threats to the species it features. It won two awards at the 67th National Film Awards, announced in March 2021.

== Synopsis ==
Wild Karnataka displays the varied habitats and species across Karnataka. The film is story driven. Subjects include Bengal tigers and Indian elephants, along with lesser-known species like lion-tailed macaques, Indian leopards, birds, amphibians and reptiles. It was the first film in India to be narrated by Sir David Attenborough.

== Background ==
Karnataka is India's 6th largest state and has a recorded forest area of 38720 km^{2} which constitutes 20.19% of the total geographical area of the state. Its ecosystem supports different kinds of forests, ranging from the wet evergreen forests of the Western Ghats, to deciduous forests of the Mysore district to thorn scrub forests and rocky outcrops of Ramanagara and Daroji, extending to the riverine and marine ecosystems, all found in this one state of Karnataka. These forests support 25% of the elephant population of India and 20% of the tiger population of the World, making it home to the largest population of tigers and Asiatic elephants on the planet. This 52 minute film took 1500 days of production with 15000 hours on the field resulting in 2400 minutes of footage from 20 cameras and 50 sequences all shot with an intention to spread awareness, love and respect for the state's majestic and beautiful natural history and heritage. All of this was shot at locations within a 7-hour drive from the capital district of the state, Bengaluru.

== Production ==
The documentary took about 4 years to produce from more than 400 hours of footage.

The film was shot using cutting-edge technology and cameras with 4K broadcast quality, and was the first to show wildlife in India from an aerial perspective. Quiet air-borne cameras were used for this so as to create minimum disturbance to the wildlife. This is the first wildlife film which has an equal representation of women, as opposed to the traditional instances where women work in the production side of a film and not as much in the field, bringing in a different perspective.

=== Filmmakers and partners ===
The team behind the film include Kalyan Varma, Prashanth S Nayaka, Praveen, Sugandhi Gadadhar, Raghunath Belur, Dilan Mandanna, Adarsh Raju, Pradeep Hegde, Pooja Rathod, Dheeraj Aithal and Ashwini Kumar Bhat and was headed by award-winning wildlife photographers and film-makers Amoghavarsha J S and Kalyan Varma with the unwavering support of Chief Conservator of Forests at Karnataka's Forest Department, Mr. Vijay Mohan Raj and acclaimed naturalist Sarath Champati.

Even though the theme of the documentary is forest and wilderness, the Forest Department has not made any funding and much of the film's financing has come from eco-tourism resorts and mining companies. The partners include Sandur Iron Ore and Manganese Limited, Discovery Village and Jungle Lodges & Resorts.

== Soundtrack ==
Wild Karnataka

Soundtrack album by Ricky Kej
- Released: 11 January 2020
- Recorded: 2019
- Studio: Ricky Kej Music
- Genre: Feature film soundtrack
- Length: 47:06
- Label: Strumm Entertainment
- Producer: Ricky Kej

Ricky Kej chronology
Mann Mein Aman (2020)	Wild Karnataka (2020)	My Earth Songs (2020)

The original soundtrack is produced by Grammy-winning composer Ricky Kej. He announced his participation in March 2019, due to his professional and personal life being attributed to music and environmentalism, He further added about creating music on sustainability as he wants the young generation to be conscious about the environment. The album features 25 tracks in total and was released on 11 January 2020.

Ricky Kej stated that he created a fusion of the east and the west, where electronic dance music has been amalgamated with Hindustani, Carnatic and Indian folk elements, which is a remix of the music he created for the album. The remix was featured in a promo video for the film and was unveiled on 3 June 2020.

Track listing
No.	Title	Length
1.	"Wild Karnataka"	1:40
2.	"Largest Cat"	1:15
3.	"Majestic"	2:37
4.	"Wolves"	1:21
5.	"Monsoon Waltz"	2:44
6.	"Eyes Everywhere"	2:56
7.	"Bubbler Crab Raaga"	2:24
8.	"Elephant Bath"	3:15
9.	"Dhol"	1:06
10.	"Magic"	1:08
11.	"Wild Karnataka Reprise"	1:21
12.	"River of Life"	1:54
13.	"Mothers Love"	1:45
14.	"Prince Peacock"	1:07
15.	"The Hornbill"	2:15
16.	"Superhero"	1:24
17.	"A Sambars Plight"	1:20
18.	"Hungry Hatch"	1:12
19.	"Last Mistake"	2:24
20.	"Indignant Defence"	2:16
21.	"Opening Theme"	1:41
22.	"The Slithering King"	2:44
23.	"Thirst"	1:32
24.	"Bear Ride"	1:55
25.	"Prologue"	1:41
Total length:		47:06

== Release ==
A special screening of Wild Karnataka was held at the United Nations headquarters on World Wildlife Day (3 March 2019), with another premiere was held at the Palace Grounds amphitheatre in Bangalore, the same day, which saw the attendance of about 3000 people. In January 2020, the producers of the film stated that the film will be the first Indian wildlife film to be released in theatres, further announcing the release date on 17 January 2020. PVR Cinemas, which acquired the distribution of the film, premiered it in multiple cities across India.

Karnataka Forest Department released the film online on 15 January 2020, two days before the scheduled release, which made the filmmakers upset. Nevertheless, the film completed 80 days in theatres and also won the Golden Jubilee Award.

The film's online rights were secured by Discovery Channel. It was released in five major platforms Discovery, Discovery HD, Animal Planet, DTamil and on the network's streaming service Discovery+, on 5 June 2020 coinciding with World Environment Day. Along with the English original, the film was dubbed and released in four Indian languages (Hindi, Tamil, Telugu and Kannada) on Discovery+ with Rajkummar Rao, Prakash Raj and Rishab Shetty providing voiceovers for their respective versions.

== Reception ==
Nitin D. Rai, chief editor of the British magazine The Wire called it as "a visually stunning technical masterpiece that ignores the humans that made the wilderness what it is". Nandini Ramanath of Scroll.in had stated "Wild Karnataka has nothing to say about the potential threats to any of the species it features, nor is the phrase “climate change” ever mentioned. The visuals speak for themselves: here is a corner of India that needs sustained funding and support so that all its creatures, great and small, may live, love and feast for eternity".

Critics Nitya Gnanapandithan and Anna M. M. Vetticad praised the maker's decision for releasing a documentary film in theatres, with the former writing for The New Indian Express stated "Wild Karnataka is truly a spectacle worthy of being seen in the theatre. It isn’t often that we get a chance to watch a documentary like this on the big screen. So we can hope this is just the beginning", the latter, in her review for Firstpost, had summarised "Wild Karnataka is also a reminder of why, despite a proliferation of online streaming platforms and an increasing use of cellphones as film-viewing media, theatres will never die: because some films are born to be watched on a mega screen in a darkened hall filled with strangers as awe-struck as you are."

== Controversy ==
The documentary film came under a controversy for illegalities by filming in forest areas within Karnataka, as claimed by a retired IFS officer of the State Forest Department of Karnataka. Based on a case filed in the High Court of Karnataka. Based on a petition filed by one Ravindra N Redkar and others, the division bench headed by Chief Justice Abhay Shreenivas Oka has ordered the film makers to refrain from telecasting the film. The issue is commercialization of the documentary film and alleged that the Karnataka Forest Department has been denied a share of the film's revenue. The legal stay in this regard has been extended till 3 September 2021, on an order passed by the Karnataka High Court on 12 August 2021. Effective immediately, the documentary can be seen removed from all the commercial platforms like Discovery+.

== Awards ==
Year	Ceremony	Category	Recipient(s)	Result	Ref.
2019	67th National Film Awards	Best Narration and Voice Over	Sir David Attenborough	Won	
2019	67th National Film Awards	Best Exploration/Adventure Film	Amoghavarsha JS, Kalyan Varma, Sarath Champati, Vijaya Mohan Raj	Won	
