= This Ain't Love =

Single by Jessica Mauboy
- Released: 11 September 2015
- Recorded: London
- Genre: Drum and bass
- Length: 3:26
- Label: Sony
- Songwriters: Jessica Mauboy; David Sneddon; Carl Ryden
- Producer: Carl Ryden

Jessica Mauboy singles chronology
"The Day Before I Met You" (2015)	"This Ain't Love" (2015)	"Chains" (2015)

Music video
- "This Ain't Love" on YouTube

"This Ain't Love" is a song recorded by Australian singer and songwriter Jessica Mauboy, originally for her fourth studio album, but was left off the track listing of Hilda (2019). It was released on 11 September 2015 as the intended first single from the album, however the album never materialised, leaving "This Ain't Love" as a standalone single. "This Ain't Love" was written by Mauboy, David Sneddon and Carl Ryden, who also handled the production. It is a drum and bass song, which contains elements of soul music. The song marked a new musical direction for Mauboy as it was a departure from her usual pop and R&B style. "This Ain't Love" received mostly positive reviews from music critics, who complimented Mauboy's vocals and the production, and believed that the song had the potential to do well on international charts. They also noted that it was reminiscent of artists such as Rudimental, Disclosure and Ella Eyre.

Upon its release, "This Ain't Love" debuted at number 41 on the Australian ARIA Singles Chart; it later peaked at number 5 and became Mauboy's ninth top-ten single. "This Ain't Love" was certified gold by the Australian Recording Industry Association (ARIA) for shipments of 35,000 copies. The accompanying music video was directed by Guy Franklin and features five different versions of Mauboy singing the song in various settings. Mauboy promoted "This Ain't Love" with interviews and performances on radio and television programs, as well as instore appearances. The song was also used in a Seven Network commercial promoting the American drama series Quantico.

== Background and release ==
In June 2015, Mauboy travelled to London for two months in pursuit of a new sound for her upcoming fourth studio album. During her trip, she held recording sessions with several songwriters and producers, including Carl Ryden and Fiona Bevan. One of the songs she recorded with Ryden was "This Ain't Love". Mauboy announced the single's release during a livestream on her official Facebook page on 10 September 2015. She also unveiled the single's cover art, which features her posing in a colourful dress designed by Romance Was Born. The following day, "This Ain't Love" was released to both radio and online digital music stores as the intended first single from Mauboy's fourth studio album that never materialized. The CD format of "This Ain't Love" was released on 25 September and included an instrumental version.

== Production and composition ==
"This Ain't Love" was written by Mauboy, Ryden and David Sneddon. It was also produced and mixed by Ryden. "This Ain't Love" is a drum and bass song which contains elements of soul music. The track marks a new musical direction for Mauboy as it is different from the usual pop and R&B style of her previous releases. "This Ain't Love" was inspired by Mauboy's love of '90s dance and pop music. Mauboy revealed that she had no fear about experimenting with the drum and bass genre that has dominated international charts in recent years, particularly in the United Kingdom. She said, "I'm not afraid to take on that genre and step into that world and bring my own twist to it. There's no hurt in doing that and I think I have really come out of my shell with this record." In the chorus, Mauboy sings: "This ain't love, I don't feel and nothing hurts. Cause this ain't love that I feel." Jessie Papain of The West Australian described "This Ain't Love" as "synth-heavy". Several music critics noted that the song's musical style was reminiscent of Rudimental, Disclosure and Ella Eyre. Thomasbleach.com also felt that its production and Mauboy's vocal delivery were similar to Eyre's.

== Reception ==
=== Critical reception ===
"This Ain't Love" received mostly positive reviews from music critics. Damian of Auspop praised the song as "a bright, frenetic, infectious, soul-filled beast". Idolator's Mike Wass described "This Ain't Love" as a "furious club-banger" and "catchy new anthem" that could do well internationally. Wass also named it Mauboy's best song since "Inescapable" (2011), and commended her for trying "a more contemporary sound". Mr. Frckls of Pop Juice labelled "This Ain't Love" as "a cracker" that is "bound to get [a] lot of airplay". He also commented that it showcases what Mauboy does best, "slowly evolving her sound, but keeping her voice the star of the song".

Sam of Hit Sync noted that "This Ain't Love" is the type of track that would get Mauboy "heard worldwide", further adding that "the explosive club-banger combines" her "impressive pipes with a rip-roaring, drum & bass arrangement producing an epic anthem that would sit nicely on the UK charts". Marcus Floyd of Renowned for Sound awarded the song four-and-a-half stars out of five and described it as "catchy, upbeat and powerful". He also praised Mauboy's "incredible vocal range and her ability to express emotions through it". A writer for the Brisbane Weekender named it an "energetic single" that showcases Mauboy's "powerful and soulful voice to its full potential". Thomasbleach.com gave "This Ain't Love" a mixed review, criticising the "generic" production for its lack of "creativity" with "predictable beats that aren't memorable". The website also felt that the single sounded like an Ella Eyre B-side track. "This Ain't Love" earned Mauboy a nomination for Best Female Artist at the 2016 ARIA Music Awards.

=== Chart performance ===
For the issue dated 21 September 2015, "This Ain't Love" debuted at number 41 on the Australian ARIA Singles Chart. It became Mauboy's twenty-first top-fifty entry on that chart and her twenty-second top one-hundred entry overall. In its second week, "This Ain't Love" dropped 34 places to number 75. Following the single's physical release and Mauboy's performance on The X Factor Australia, "This Ain't Love" ascended 67 places to number eight in its third week, and became Mauboy's ninth top-ten single. In its fourth week, the song peaked at number five. "This Ain't Love" was certified gold by the Australian Recording Industry Association (ARIA) for shipments of 35,000 copies.

== Music video ==
"Working with Guy [Franklin], I wanted to bring the different sides of Jess, not just create and show the different emotions of me. I guess a day in the life of me, throughout a day. From sad, happy, to attitude, its all in there about me. They really symbolise who I am. They are like my alter egos."

— Mauboy on the five different versions of her in the video.

The music video was directed by Guy Franklin and released exclusively on Apple Music on 28 September 2015. The video opens with shots of four different Mauboy's each in their own settings; the first Mauboy is seen leaning against a pole, the second is shown sitting by a bed, the third is seen standing by a window with a disco ball, and the fourth Mauboy is shown holding onto a chain-link fence. The video then shows a close-up shot of the fifth Mauboy singing the song's lyrics in front of a black backdrop. As the camera zooms out from her, the clip shows all five Mauboy's standing next to each other. They are then seen singing the chorus at the same time while walking.

The video is then intercut with scenes of the five Mauboy's individually singing in front of the black backdrop and back at their own settings, with the fifth Mauboy now singing in front of flashing lights. These are also intercut with scenes of Mauboy standing in front of her love interest with his arms around her. Afterwards, she is seen lying on the ground surrounded by disco balls and then the clip continues to show intercut scenes of the five Mauboy's singing in their own settings. Towards the end of the video, the five Mauboy's are shown standing next to each other again and singing the song together. It then ends with the video returning to a shot of Mauboy and her lover. Damian of Auspop praised the interaction of the five Mauboy's, but felt that there was "not really a lot to" the video.

== Promotion ==
On the day of the single's release, a behind-the-scenes clip of the photo shoot for the cover art was shown on the Today show. The clip was later uploaded to Mauboy's Vevo channel on 13 September. Throughout September, the song was used in a Seven Network commercial promoting the American drama series Quantico. Mauboy also promoted "This Ain't Love" with radio interviews on Fitzy and Wippa (11 September) and Matt & Jane (8 October), and television performances on The X Factor Australia (29 September) and Sunrise (7 October). For her performance on The X Factor Australia, she wore a plunging black blue dress with gold, pink and blue panels. Mauboy also performed and signed copies of "This Ain't Love" during instore appearances at the Royal Melbourne Show (22–23 September), Westfield Burwood (26 September), Roselands Shopping Centre (1 October), Westfield Tuggerah (5 October), Bond Café in Sydney (6 October), and Westfield West Lakes (10 October).

== Track listing ==
- Digital download
1. "This Ain't Love" – 3:26
- CD single
1. "This Ain't Love" – 3:30
2. "This Ain't Love" (Instrumental) – 3:28

== Charts ==
Chart (2015)	Peak position
Australia (ARIA)	5

== Certifications ==
Region	Certification	Certified units/sales
Australia (ARIA)	Gold	35,000^{^}
^{^} Shipments figures based on certification alone.

== Release history ==
Region	Date	Format	Label	Catalogue
Australia	11 September 2015	Radio; digital download	Sony Music Australia	
Australia	25 September 2015	CD	Sony Music Australia	88875130012
