= The Last Hop(e) =

- Directed by: Dheeraj Aithal, Pradeep Hegde
- Produced by: Observers Studio Moundian Films
- Cinematography: Dheeraj Aithal, Pradeep Hegde
- Edited by: Ere Gowda
- Distributed by: Moundain Films
- Release date: 2019
- Country: India

The Last Hop(e) is a film on C R Naik & Clinton Vaz, common people who could do their best to save the frogs of Western Ghats, India. The film was directed by Dheeraj Aithal and Pradeep Hegde.

== Festivals ==
- Nature in Focus 2019
- Goa Environmental FIlm Festival
- Wildlife Conservation Trust
- Film South Asia 2019
- Habitat International Film Festival 2024
