= 2015 Cricket World Cup opening ceremony =

Cricket World Cup opening ceremony fireworks, Christchurch

The opening ceremonies of the 2015 Cricket World Cup took place in New Zealand and Australia on 12 February 2015, the eve of the beginning of the World Cup hosted by them after 23 years. Two ceremonies took place at the same time, one in North Hagley Park, Christchurch in New Zealand while the other in Melbourne, Australia. Thousands of fans turned up to watch the opening ceremony in both locations. It was the largest event hosted by Christchurch since the deadly 2011 Christchurch earthquake.

== Performances ==
There were performances showcasing the culture of each of the participating nation at both the venues. These included the following:

=== At Christchurch ===
- Performance by a Maori troupe.
- Solo musical performances by popular Kiwi singer Hayley Westenra.
- Performances by popular New Zealand musical band Shapeshifter.

=== At Melbourne ===
- Kandyan dance performance by a Sri Lankan troupe.
- Performance by a British Bagpiper.
- An Irish River Dance performance.
- Performance by Pakistani artists of the popular anthem Jazba Junoon.

== Notable guests ==
=== At Christchurch ===
Apart from the performing singers, some notable guests were also present in the event at Christchurch like Mayor of Christchurch Lianne Dalziel, Prime Minister of New Zealand John Key, All Blacks captain Richie McCaw, Hollywood director Peter Jackson, cricketers Lasith Malinga, Brendon McCullum, AB de Villiers and the other members of the New Zealand, Sri Lanka, South Africa and Zimbabwe cricket teams playing in the tournament. There were also some former cricketers present there, namely Chris Harris, Rod Latham, Geoff Allott, Stephen Fleming and Richard Hadlee.

== See also ==
- 2015 Cricket World Cup
- 2011 Cricket World Cup opening ceremony
