= Malnad College of Engineering =

Indian government aided college

Coordinates: 13°1′22.26″N 76°6′12.55″E

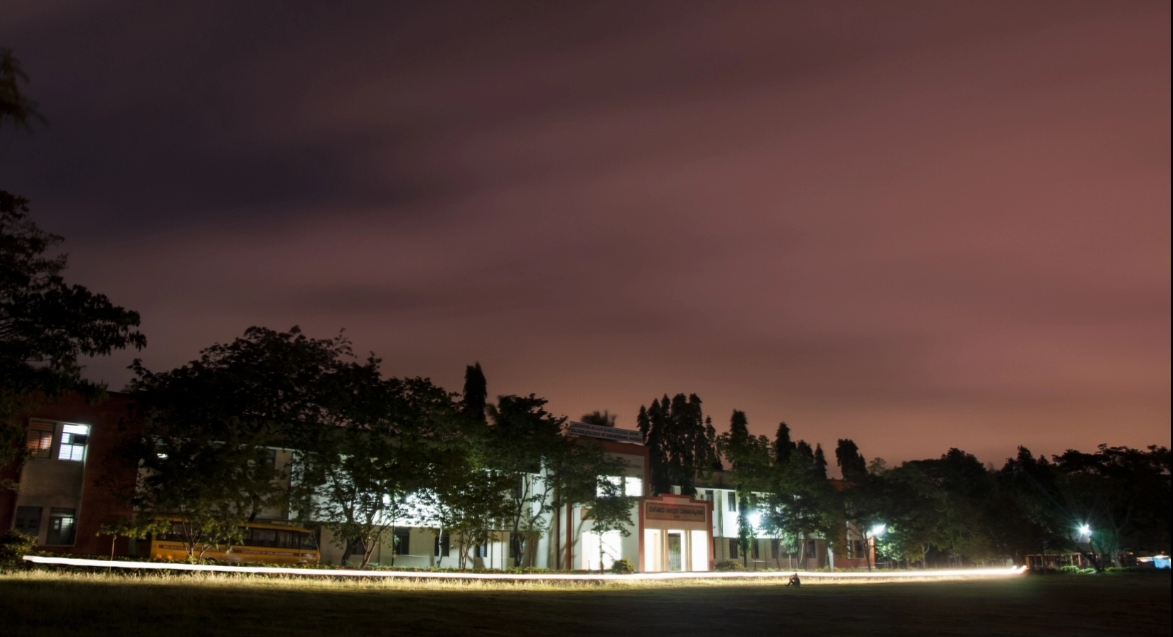
- Main block at twilight
- Motto: Nahi Jnanena Sadrusham
- Motto in English: Nothing is equal to Knowledge
- Type: Government Aided Engineering College
- Established: 1960
- Affiliations: VTU
- Principal: Dr. S. Pradeep
- Location: Hassan, Karnataka, India
- Campus: Urban
- Website: www.mcehassan.ac.in

Malnad College of Engineering (MCE) is an engineering college located in Hassan, Karnataka, India. It was established in 1960, during the second 5 year plan of India, as a joint venture between the Government of India, Government of Karnataka and the Malnad Technical Education Society, Hassan. The institution is affiliated with the Visvesvaraya Technological University in Belgaum.

The college is built on a campus of about 44 acres (180,000 m^{2}) and is a technical education center.

The college was affiliated to the University of Mysore but changed affiliation to Visvesvaraya Technological University, Belgaum. In 2007 the college became autonomous.

== Notable alumni ==
- Job Kurian, Singer
- Charan Raj, 2006, music director and composer
- Sudhir Shivaram, 1993, Indian wildlife photographer and entrepreneur
