= Ricky Kej =

Indian composer (born 1981)

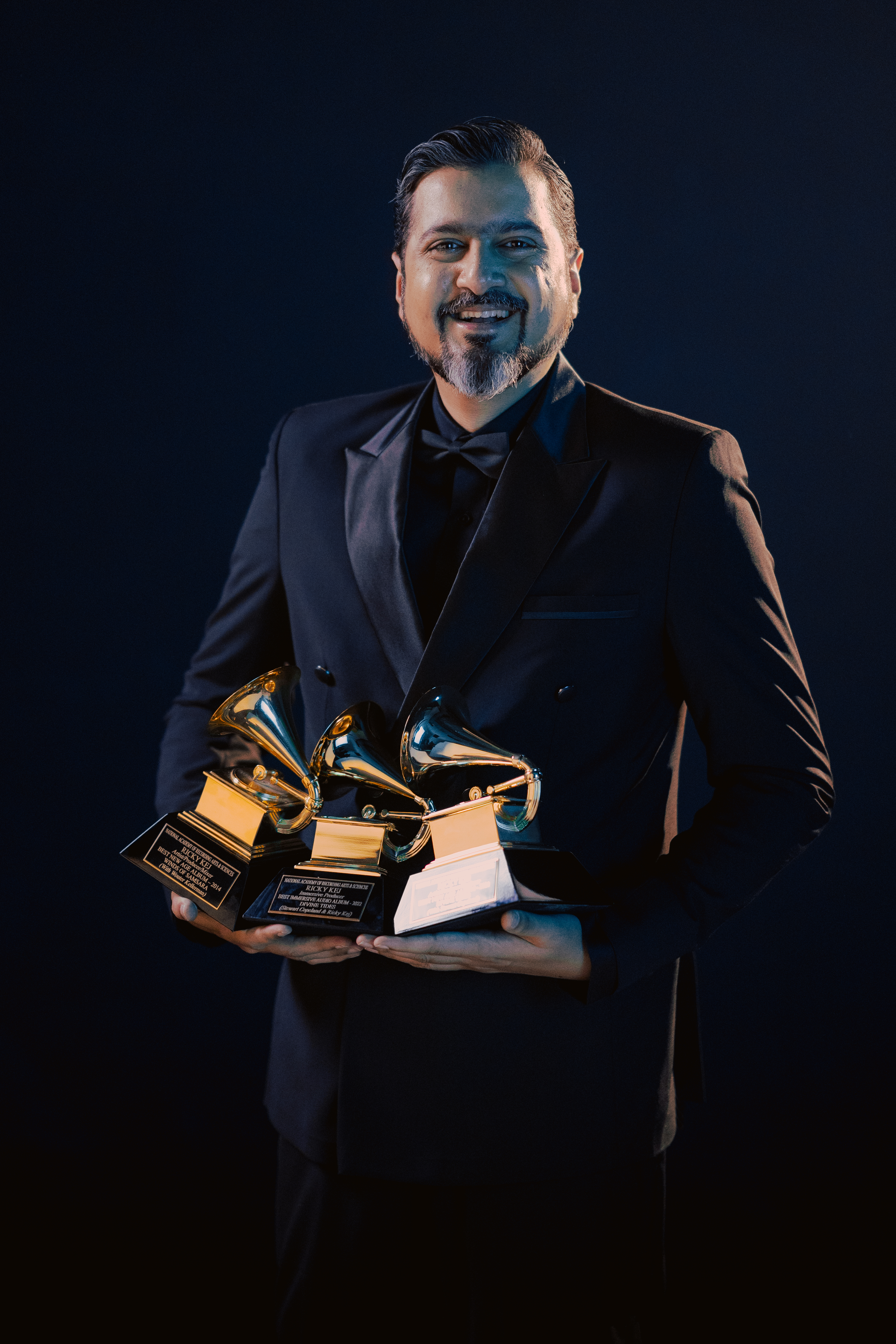
- Ricky Kej with his three Grammy Awards

Background information
- Born: Ram Gyan Kej; 5 August 1981 (age 45)
- Occupations: Music Composer, Songwriter, Record Producer
- Years active: 2000–present
- Website: rickykej.com

Ram Gyan "Ricky" Kej (born 5 August 1981) is an Indian music composer, environmentalist, a three-time Grammy Award winner and a four-time Grammy nominee. Kej received the Padma Shri award India's fourth highest civilian award, in 2025 by the President of India, Smt Droupadi Murmu for his contributions to the Arts. He has performed at venues including at the United Nations headquarters in New York and Geneva. In October 2023, Kej was announced as a UN Goodwill Ambassador (UNCCD) at the United Nations General Assembly by then President, Csaba Körösi. He was also awarded the Lokmat Sur Jyotsna National Music Award 2025 for his contribution to Indian music.

Kej is the Guinness World Record holder for the world's largest singing lesson, achieved through the recording of 13,944 tribal children performing the Indian National Anthem. The lesson is among the largest mass-participation musical education events involving indigenous children.

Kej was also named a UNCCD Land Ambassador at the COP14 to raise public awareness about the challenges of land degradation, desertification and drought. Kej serves as a "High-Profile Supporter" of the United Nations High Commissioner for Refugees (UNHCR), UNESCO - MGIEP Global Ambassador for Kindness, UNICEF Celebrity Supporter, and is an ambassador for the Earth Day Network. In 2020, Kej was named as a GQ Hero 2020 by GQ India magazine and in 2023, Kej was named as one of GQ India's "Man of the Year".

Kej is credited with over 3,500 placements for radio and television jingles. He composed the music for the 2011 Cricket World Cup opening ceremony, held at Dhaka on 17 February 2011. On 18 July 2016, he was awarded the Excellence and Leadership award as a global humanitarian artist at the United Nations Headquarters, New York and performed excerpts from Shanti Samsara live in the United Nations General Assembly Hall. Kej concluded his performance at the United Nations General Assembly by saying, "To end, I want to state the obvious ... Climate change is real ... Climate change is human induced. Climate change is affecting us all ... and our actions affect countries on the other side of the world."

== Early life and education ==
Ricky Kej was born in North Carolina on 5 August 1981. Half Punjabi and Marwari by birth, Kej grew up in North Carolina and moved to Bangalore, India when he was six years old and has lived there since. He attended the Bishop Cotton Boys' School, Bangalore and studied dentistry at the Oxford Dental College in Bangalore. He did not pursue a career in the field and opted for a career in music instead. Kej holds two Doctorate Degrees (Doctor of Letters) from the Kalinga Institute of Social Sciences, Bubaneshwar and from Gitam University in Visakhapatnam, India. Kej's life and journey as a musician are now taught to 7th-grade children in India as part of the ICSE syllabus English textbooks. Kej is also a professor at the National Institute of Advanced Studies (at the Indian Institute of Science) and an Honorary Fellow at Ashoka Trust for Research in Ecology and The Environment (ATREE).

While attending university he joined a progressive rock band which he says gave him a good foundation and exposure to music. In an early interview, Kej's mother, Pammi Kej, has opined that her son's artistic genes were inherited from his grandfather Janaki Das, an actor, Olympic cyclist, and freedom fighter. Kej said he does not consider degree in dentistry as an alternate career option, and notes that there are ups and downs in every occupation and there is no real need for a backup career. He said that his decision to follow a career in music was not an easy one for his parents to accept.

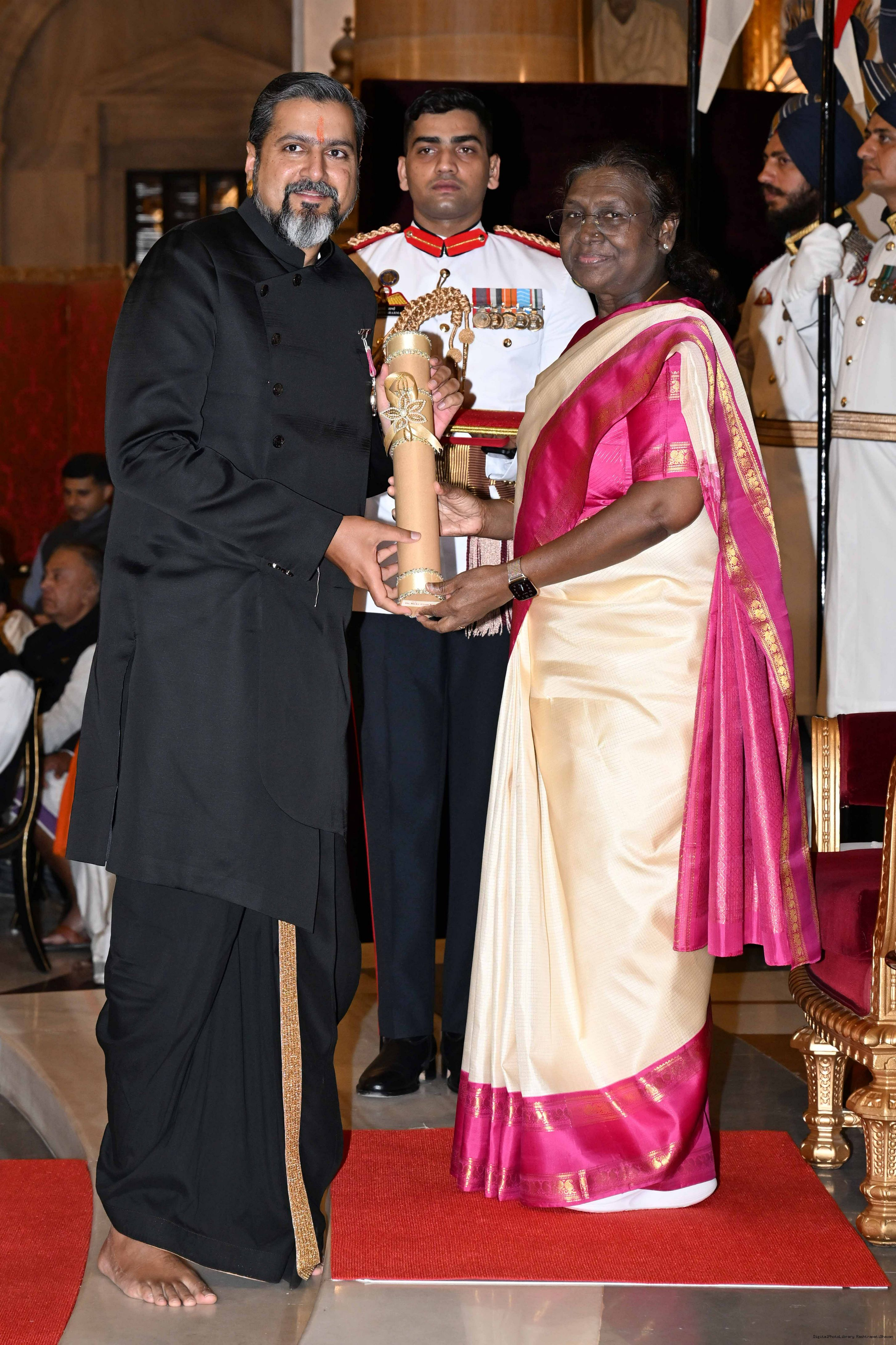
Ricky Kej receiving the Padma Shri Award from the President of India, Droupadi Murmu

== Music career ==
=== Beginnings ===
Kej started off his career as the keyboardist of Bengaluru-based progressive rock band Angel Dust. Two years into the band, he moved on to become a full-time composer and set up his own studio, Raveolution, in 2003. He eventually went on to create music for over 3,000 ad jingles and Kannada films.

=== Shanti Orchestra ===
Kej's 13th studio album, Shanti Orchestra, was released on 9 July 2013. The album peaked at No. 3 in November 2013 on the ZMR Top 100 Radio Airplay Chart, and was ranked No. 37 on the ZMR Top 100 Airplay Chart for 2013. The album was nominated for a 2013 ZMR Music Award and the track "Forever" from the album was also nominated for a Hollywood Music in Media (HMMA) Award in the same year.

=== 2 Unite All ===
Kej produced a benefit album, 2 Unite All, with Peter Gabriel aimed at urgent humanitarian aid to the Palestinians in Gaza. The album also features Stewart Copeland, drummer from the English rock band the Police, drummer Rick Allen of English rock band Def Leppard, American rock band System of a Down frontman Serj Tankian, and Grammy Award-winning opera singer Sasha Cooke.

=== Winds of Samsara ===
Winds of Samsara, his 14th studio album and a collaboration with South African flautist Wouter Kellerman, was released on 15 July 2014 after being in production for two years. "The 'Samsara' in the album name has many meanings – the world around us, the world within us, family, ideals, etc. Winds was specifically chosen because of the album's flute-based style." The album debuted at No. 1 on the US Billboard New Age Albums Chart in August 2014, a first for a person of Indian origin and stayed in the top 10 for 12 weeks straight. The album also peaked at No. 1 on the Zone Music Reporter Top 100 Radio Airplay Chart in the month of July 2014, and was ranked No. 3 on the ZMR Top 100 Airplay Chart for 2014. The album received the Grammy award for Best New Age Album in February 2015. Kej dedicated the award to non-film music composers in India.

=== Shanti Samsara ===
On 30 November 2015, Kej's album Shanti Samsara – World Music for Environmental Consciousness was launched on 30 November 2015 at the 2015 United Nations Climate Change Conference by Indian Prime Minister Narendra Modi and then French president, Francois Hollande. The prime minister personally presented French president François Hollande with a copy of the CD. In the months since its launch, Kej has traveled widely speaking about conservation and the environment, including a visit to the Republic of Kiribati, where he interviewed and created music with three-term ex-president, Anote Tong. A video featuring music from the album was also played for UN Secretary-General Ban Ki-moon and the gathering of world leaders. The album was one of several projects discussed during a meeting Prime Minister Modi had with Kej following his Grammy win. Kej found inspiration in Modi's concern for the environment and set out to specifically develop a project to express a message of environmental consciousness. When completed, more than 300 actors, artists and musicians from around the world had contributed to the making of the album's 24 tracks and four music videos. These include:

- Indian musicians Vishwa Mohan Bhatt and famed Bollywood actor Amitabh Bachchan
- American singer-songwriter Gary Nicholson
- Stewart Copeland
- Patti Austin
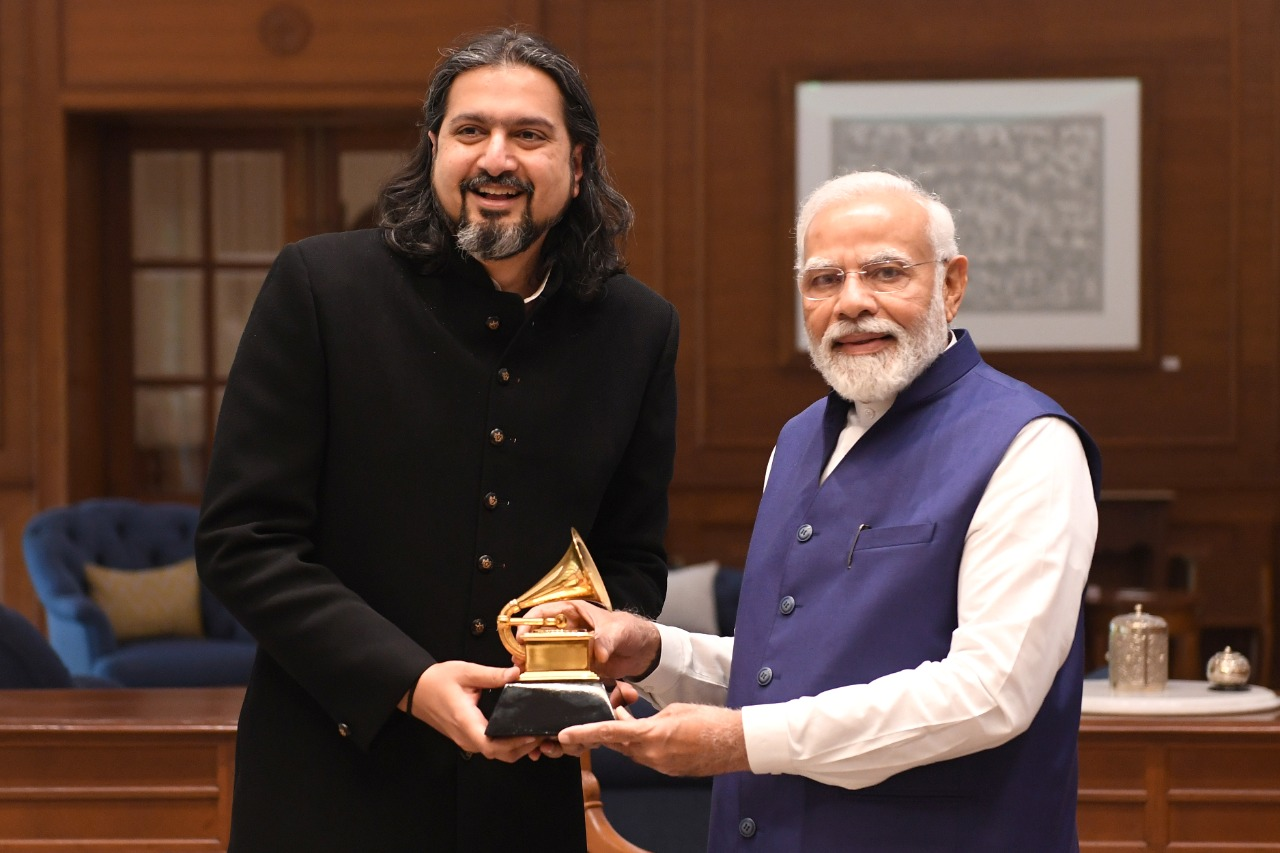
  Ricky Kej with Indian Prime Minister, Shri Narendra Modi after his Grammy Award win
- Philip Lawrence from Bruno Mars
- Regular collaborator Wouter Kellerman
- The Royal Philharmonic Orchestra
- Christopher Tin
- Darlene Koldenhoven
- Peter Yarrow
- Ladysmith Black Mambazo
- the Soweto Gospel Choir
- the Monks of Sherab Ling
- Canadian vocalist Jennifer Gasoi
- the "Singing Nun of Nepal" Ani Choying Drolma
- Chinese zither virtuoso Mei Han
- Taiwanese erhu player Lan Tung
- Azeri singer Ilhama Gasimova
- artists and soloists from Vietnam, Korea and Senegal
- the voice talents of Frances Fisher, Rosanna Arquette, Lindsay Wagner and a special message spoken by Japanese Prime Minister Shinzō Abe

On 23 December 2015, Kej was invited to perform a song from Shanti Samsara in a special arrangement featuring over a hundred students from the Bishop Cotton Boys' School in a special performance for India's President Pranab Mukherjee. Also in attendance were many state and national officials and an audience of nearly 13,000 people. In 2016 "Samsara" from Shanti Samsara received the December 2015 Global Music Awards Gold Medal for World Music – India, and the International Acoustic Music Awards for Best Open/Acoustic Open Genre and on 1 March 2016, he was named as a finalist in the 2015 in the World Music category of the John Lennon Songwriting Contest.

=== My Earth Songs ===
In 2018, Kej released My Earth Songs, music for children on the environment and sustainability. Each of the 27 songs is based on a United Nations Sustainable Development Goal aimed to create awareness and inspire the younger generation to make a tangible positive impact in their lives and lives of people around them. Notably, Kej has released these songs in the public domain for completely non-commercial purposes. Kej has teamed up with Macmillan Publishers to feature these songs in English language school textbooks from 2019. He has also partnered with UNICEF to spread these songs to children across the world and is working on translating them to several different Indian and global languages. My Earth Songs was honoured at the UN SDG Action Awards in Bonn, Germany on 2 May 2019 for its outreach and impact. The UN SDG Action Awards recognize outstanding achievements and innovative efforts to promote action on the Sustainable Development Goals. My Earth Songs has been featured in over seven million school textbooks across India as part of educational material promoting environmental awareness and sustainability among students.

=== Divine Tides ===
In June 2021, Kej released Divine Tides in collaboration with Stewart Copeland who is the founder of The Police. Kej and Stewart Copeland recorded this album in its entirety virtually over the course of the COVID-19 pandemic and only met in person later on. Featuring artists from around the world, Divine Tides garnered rave reviews and eventually won Kej his second Grammy Award for the Best New Age Album category at the 64th Annual Grammy Awards held in Las Vegas in April 2022. This album was critically acclaimed by numerous news agencies such as Rolling Stone, Bloomberg, The Sunday Guardian, India Today among others.

In 2023, Ricky Kej won his third Grammy for his album "Divine Tides" at the 65th Annual Grammy Awards in the Best Immersive Audio Album category, which took place in Los Angeles in February.

=== Police - Beyond Borders ===
After winning two Grammy Awards together, Kej and Stewart Copeland teamed up again to launch their album Police - Beyond Borders in August 2023. Featuring a reimagination of some of the most iconic songs of The Police with symphony orchestra in diverse global languages and traditional musical styles, this album featured global artists such as the frontman of System of a Down - Serj Tankian, Chinese superstar Cui Jian, Soweto Gospel Choir and Mzansi Youth Choir from South Africa, Indian singers and composers Shankar Mahadevan and Salim-Sulaiman, Berklee Indian Ensemble and many more.

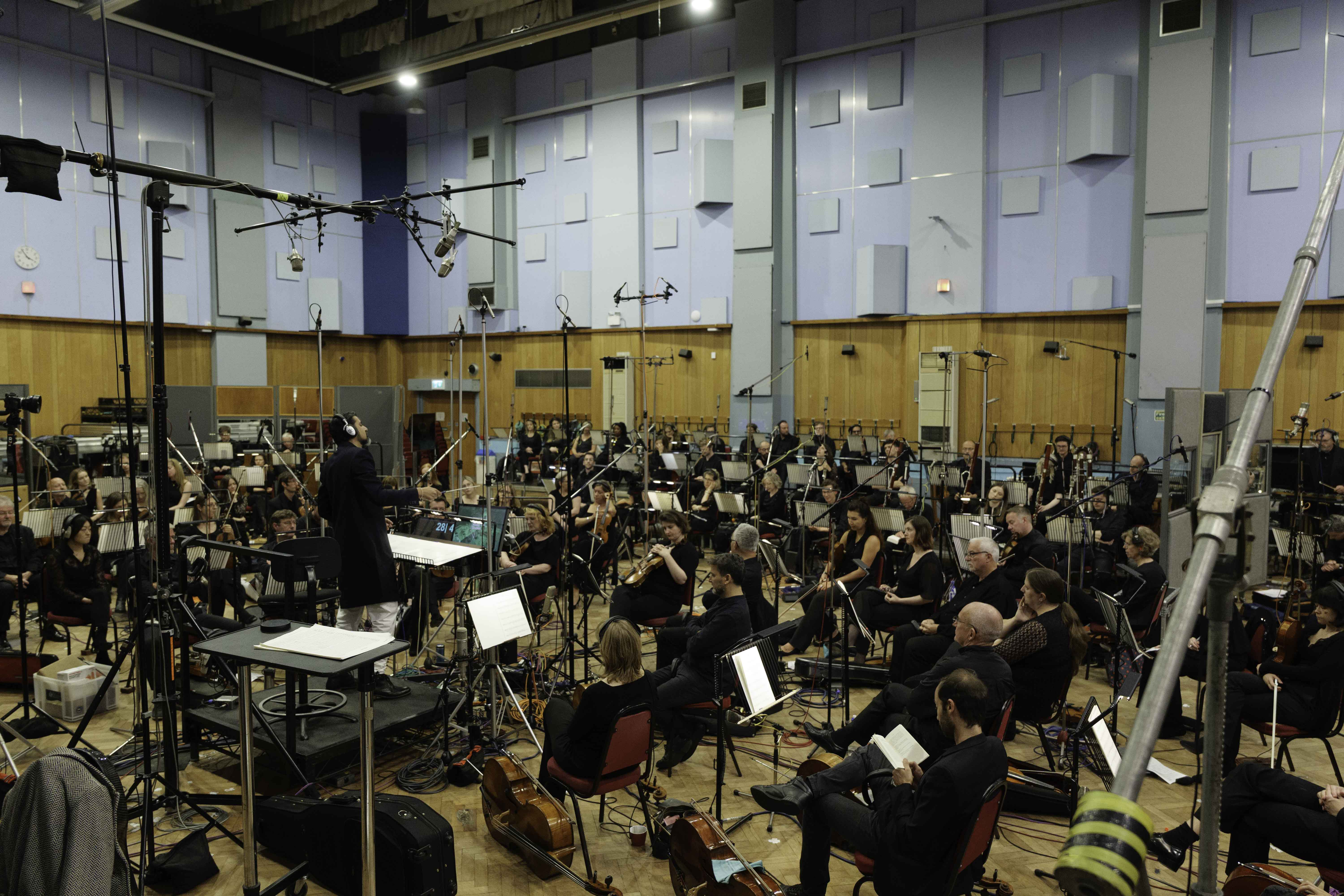
Ricky Kej Conducting the 100-piece Royal Philharmonic Orchestra at Abbey Road Studios in London

=== Rendition of the Indian National Anthem ===
In August 2023, Kej released his rendition of the Indian National Anthem featuring over 100 musicians of the Royal Philharmonic Orchestra in London to commemorate India's Independence Day. It was recorded at Abbey Road Studios. This rendition was praised by several leaders of the Indian Government including Prime Minister Narendra Modi sharing it on their social media pages.

=== Break of Dawn ===
In August 2024, Kej released his new album Break of Dawn. The album received a nomination at the 67th Grammy Awards for "Best New Age, Ambient, or Chant Album".Break of Dawn is inspired by ancient Indian classical raags and created with a focus on mental health and wellness. The album has been cited by academic institutions including Stanford Global Health and the Stanford School of BioDesign for its potential contribution to addressing the global burden of mental health conditions through music-based interventions. Its therapeutic applications are also being explored through clinical research collaborations in India, positioning the album at the intersection of traditional music, contemporary composition, and health-focused innovation. The album was released under Vedam Records, a wellness music label launched by Universal Music Group India in partnership with Kej.

=== Gandhi - Mantras of Compassion ===
In July 2025, Kej released Gandhi - Mantras of Compassion , created in collaboration with Nobel Peace Prize laureate Kailash Satyarthi, Grammy Award-winning Japanese composer Masa Takumi and internationally acclaimed cellist Tina Guo as a musical tribute to the life and philosophy of Mahatma Gandhi. Conceived as a global collaboration, the album features contributions from over 200 musicians across more than 40 countries, and blends ancient Indian mantras, global musical traditions, and contemporary orchestration to reflect Gandhian ideals of nonviolence, peace, tolerance, environmental consciousness, and compassion.

== Musical style ==
Though Kej's work is an amalgamation of multiple genres, he has maintained that the essence of his work retains the aesthetic of his Indian roots, largely based on Hindustani classical music and a bit of Karnataka(Carnatic) music. He has cited Pakistani qawwal Nusrat Fateh Ali Khan and British vocalist Peter Gabriel as inspirations to constantly challenge and push his own musical boundaries. Kej is a self-taught musician but studied classical music at around the age of 24 to overcome what he observed as a handicap at the time.

== Notable live performances ==
- In June 2015, Kej was a featured artist and performer at the 11th ZMR Annual Music Awards and Gala Celebration in New Orleans, LA
- In December 2015, Kej gave an exclusive performance for the President of India, Dr. Pranab Mukherjee at the Bishop Cotton Boys' School, Bengaluru
- In July 2016, on the occasion of Prime Minister Narendra Modi's state visit to South Africa, Kej performed for Indian Prime Minister, Narendra Modi and other South African state leaders
- In July 2016, Kej performed at the United Nations General Assembly at the United Nations Headquarters in New York
- In May 2017, Kej performed at the United Nations General Assembly for a second time on invitation by Peter Thomson, the then-President of the UN General Assembly.
- Kej performed in Langley, Canada, in aid of United Nations Women, to raise awareness on the plight of child brides
- In October 2017, Kej performed at the historic Vidhana Soudha, Bengaluru with his ensemble of over 200 musicians from eight countries. In attendance were legislators, ministers, bureaucrats, and the president of the island nation of Kiribati, Anote Tong.
- In January 2018, Kej delivered the finale performance at the RoundGlass Music Awards 2018 at Times Square, New York. The event saw Ringo Starr, BT, and Ronny Cox being honoured.
- In June 2018, Kej performed to thousands of people in front of the historic India Gate as a part of the Global Environment Day celebrations
- In May 2018, Kej performed 2 concerts at the Simon Fraser University, Surrey, and at the Surrey Fusion Festival.
- In October 2018, Kej performed for the President of India, the Chief Minister of Uttar Pradesh, Minister of Science & Technology for the Indian International Science Festival.
- In October 2018, Kej performed a large-scale concert for the Chinmaya Mission at the Jawaharlal Nehru Indoor Stadium, Chennai to over 6000 people
- In October 2018, Kej performed for the Queen of Mysore and over 20,000 people at the historic Mysore Palace as a part of their annual Dussehra celebrations.
- In October 2018, Kej was invited by the World Health Organization (WHO) to perform at the historic Palais Des Nations headquarters of the United Nations in Geneva, Switzerland for the first Global Air Pollution Conference.
- In December 2018, Kej performed at the annual Visakha Utsav in Andhra Pradesh on 28 December to over 88,000 people.
- In February 2019, Kej was invited to perform at the Headquarters of the World Health Organization on 14 February in Geneva, Switzerland as a part of the launch of their "Make Listening Safe" initiative.
- In July 2019, on the occasion of Kargil Vijay Diwas celebrating 20 years of India's victory over Pakistan in the Kargil War, Kej performed a concert in Leh to over 10,000 soldiers of the Indian Army.
- In September 2019, Kej performed at the high-level COP14 summit in New Delhi to an audience of world leaders, high-level dignitaries. He was honored with the title of UNCCD Land Ambassador by Ibrahim Thiaw, the Executive Secretary of the UNCCD.
- In September 2019, Kej performed multiple concerts in New York, notably at Central Park for the World Health Organization's Walk the Talk: The Health for All Challenge Campaign.
- In October 2019, Kej performed at the launch of the United Nations Global Campaign on Sustainable Nitrogen Management in Colombo, Sri Lanka.
- In December 2019, Kej was the headlining act in Vietnam for the Hozo Festival.
- In January 2020, Kej headlined the Jaipur Literature Festival and he followed this with a live performance to over 20,000 people at Sirsi for Kadambotsava 2020.
- In May 2022, Kej was invited to open the Cannes Film Festival with a concert. This was the first time that the Cannes Film Festival opened with a music performance.
- In October 2022, Kej was invited to perform at The Food and Agriculture Organization of the United Nations in Rome to celebrate World Food Day.
- In November 2022, Kej performed for UNICEF's celebration of "World Children's Day" which was also attended by Sachin Tendulkar and Ayushmann Khurrana as the regional ambassadors in New Delhi, India.
- In December 2022, Kej headlined concerts at the "HOZO Festival" in Vietnam as well as the annual Serendipity Arts Festival in Panaji, Goa.
- In February 2023, Kej performed at the G20 Summit in Bengaluru. In attendance were the Finance Ministers of all participating nations and several High-level delegates. In April 2023, Kej performed in Bhubaneshwar, India to over 6000 people for the Y20 Summit. In attendance were the Members of Parliament from all G20 Nations. In April 2023, Kej performed in Leh, India for the G20 Summit to celebrate India's G20 Presidency. Ministers from all G20 Nations and several high-level delegates were present
- In March 2023, Kej performed at the Historic Gateway of India in Mumbai to over 5000 people for "Mumbai Kaustubh"
- In April 2023, Kej headlined the "Namaste France" festival in Paris at the La Seine Musicale to perform for an exclusive audience. This event celebrated 25 years of strategic partnership between India and France
- In June 2023, Kej performed at the United Nations Headquarters in New York for the UNCCD along with Senegalese singer Baaba Maal and Malian singer Inna Modja to launch their Her Land, Her Rights Campaign. Modja is also a Goodwill Amabassador. The performance was to raise the profile of the UNCCD's campaign to increase the ownership of land by women.
- In July 2023, Kej joined hands with the American India Foundation to perform a benefit concert at the historic Gotham Hall in New York. A record-breaking 3.1 million dollars was raised to support Skilling, Nutrition, Education, and Health to mitigate the effects of COVID-19 in Education, Livelihoods, and Public Health
- In July 2023, Kej performed at the launch of the World Rehabilitation Alliance in Geneva, at the WHO Headquarters.
- In August 2023, Kej performed a sold-out concert at the Siri Fort Auditorium in New Delhi. This was a concert for Indian Prime Minister Narendra Modi's 'Mission LiFe' to inspire change and celebrate Mother Nature
- In August 2023, Kej headlined the 'Festival of Nations' in St.Louis, Missouri. Over 20,000 people were in attendance.
- In August 2023, Kej performed with Stewart Copeland at an exclusive concert in New Delhi
- In September 2023, Kej headlined the 'Ganesh Utsav' in Bangalore and performed for over 5000 people
- In September 2023, Kej performed in Central Park, New York for the World Health Organisation's "Walk the Talk" event to promote Health for All.
- In November 2023, Kej headlined the Virasat Festival in Dehradun, Uttarakhand, and performed for over 7000 people
- In December 2023, Kej performed at the Dubai Opera House with Stewart Copeland for the COP28 Summit. Leaders from several participating nations were in attendance.
- In December 2023, Kej performed in Geneva at the prestigious UNHCR Nansen Refugee Award Ceremony. Established in 1954, the UNCHR Nansen Refugee Award honors individuals, groups, and organizations who go above and beyond the call of duty to protect refugees, as well as internally displaced and stateless people
- In December 2023, Kej performed to the backdrop of the historic Victoria Memorial in Kolkata to celebrate the Indian Army's "Vijay Diwas"
- In September 2024, Kej performed in pre antaragani, one of the biggest cultural fests in India, at IIT kanpur.
- In October 2024, Kej took the stage at Falak, the cultural fest of Manipal Institute of Technology, Bengaluru.
- In December 2024, Kej performed at Hornbill Festival in Nagaland for several thousand people
- In January 2025, Kej performed in IIM Ahmedabad as a headliner for CHAOS IIMA 2025
- In January 2025, Kej headlined Alpen Capital's 21st Global Fusion Festival in Dubai
- In March 2025, Kej performed in Cartegena, Colombia for the WHO 2nd Global Conference on Air Pollution and Health
- In June 2025, Kej performed at the Asia Society and Museum in New York

== Other work ==
In 2008 Kej received an advertising award at the One Show Awards, followed by a second advertising award at the Adfest Asia Awards in 2009. In 2010, he was nominated for an award at the Cannes Film Festival for his jingle for Nike. He was dubbed an "India Rules Artist" by TV channel VH1 in 2013. Kej has appeared as a guest judge on many singing reality shows in India. Kej is a trustee and founding member of the Majolly Music Trust. Their main objectives are to raise the standards of music education in India and to set up a pension fund for old and infirm musicians who are no longer able to make a livelihood from musical performances and recordings. In 2020, Kej was shortlisted as a finalist in two categories at the India Australia Business & Community Awards (IABCA).

In 2018, Kej was named in the "Real Leaders 100 List". Real Leaders (a signatory to the United Nations) curates this list of leaders who 'Inspire the Future'. He was the only representative from India. In May 2018, Kej was honoured by the House of Commons of Canada for "Outstanding Musical and Humanitarian Achievement".

In 2020, Ricky collaborated with UNESCO Mahatma Gandhi Institute of Education for Peace and Sustainable Development (MGIEP) to release the song "Shine Your Light". The song was a collaboration between Indian artists and refugee artists who were persecuted for their love of music. The song was performed in four different languages (English, Dari, Farsi, and Pashto) by 24 young refugee musicians living in India, inviting listeners to celebrate humanity, togetherness, and solidarity.

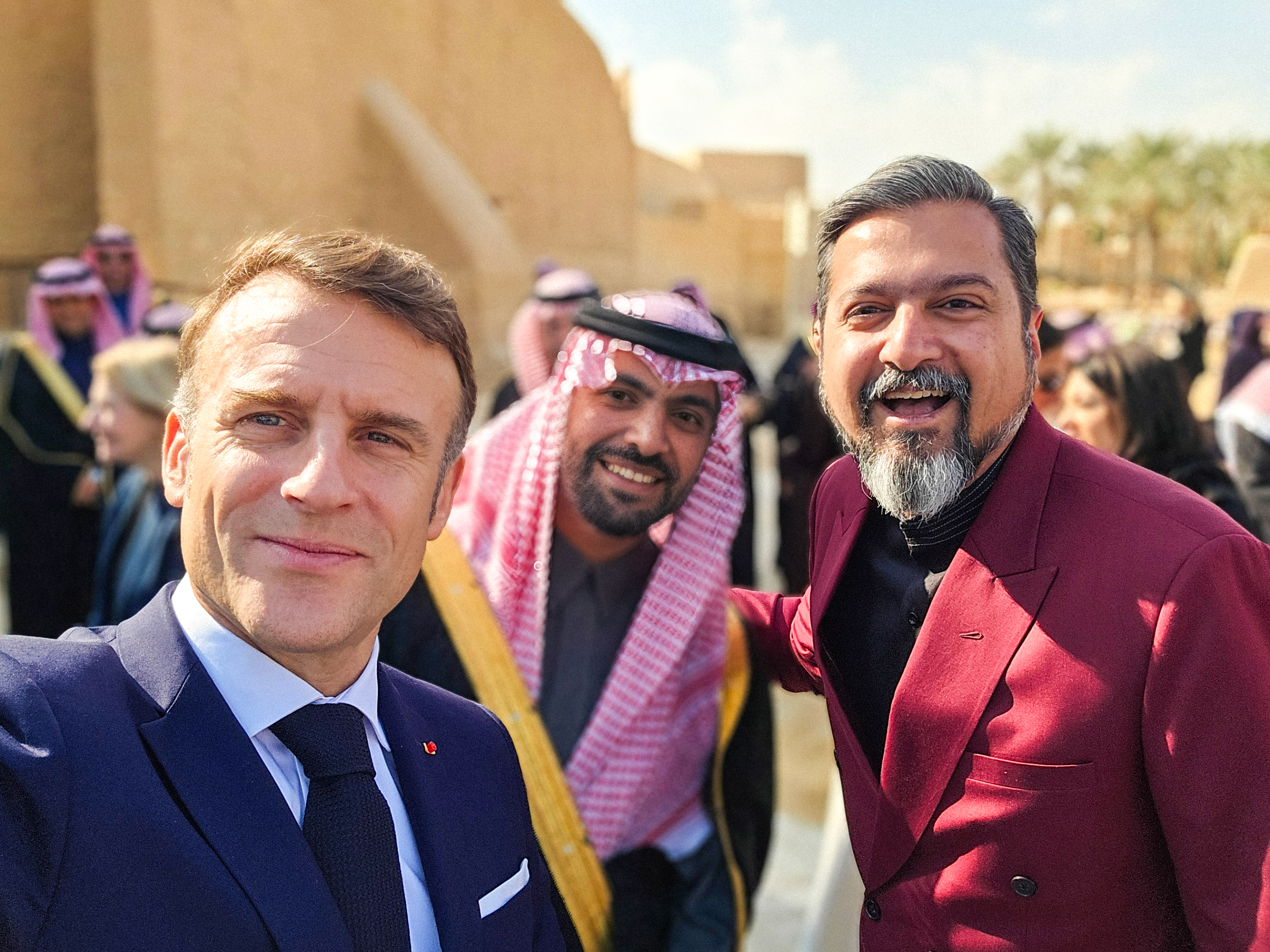
Ricky Kej with President of France, Emmanuel Macron and Minister of Culture of Saudi Arabi, Prince Badr bin Farhan Al Saud

In 2022, on India's 75th Independence Day, Ricky brought together 12 refugees from 4 nationalities to record a rendition of India's national anthem as a tribute to India. In December, he was announced as a UNHCR "Goodwill Ambassador".

At the Asia Initiatives Gala in September 2022, Kej was also awarded with the prestigious "Ban Ki-Moon Award" by former Secretary General of United Nations, Ban Ki-Moon for this advocacy work.

Kej works closely with several wings of the United Nations. As a United Nations Goodwill Ambassador (UNCCD), Kej uses his works to create awareness on issues such land degradation, desertification and drought. He Has Composed, he has composed the official "Land Anthem" for the UNCCD and advocate for their "Her Land, Her Rights" campaign to champion Gender Equality and Women's Land Rights. Kej is a "High Profile Supporter of the two-time Nobel Peace-Prize Winning organization United Nations High Commissioner for Refugees (UNCHR) and is involved in several of their campaign to protect refugees and other displaced peoples. Kej works closely with the World Health Organizations" "Make Listening Safe" initiative that aims to realize a world where people of all ages can enjoy recreational listening without risk to their hearing. Kej also works with UNICEF as a "Celebrity Supporter" to help protect children's rights.

== Personal Life ==
Kej married Varsha Gowda in 2014. The couple divorced in 2026.

== Awards ==
=== Grammy Awards ===
Year	Recipient	Nominated work	Award	Result	Ref.
2025	Ricky Kej	Break of Dawn	Grammy Nominee at the 67th Annual Grammy Awards	Nominee	
2023	Ricky Kej / Stewart Copeland	Divine Tides	Grammy Award for Best Immersive Audio Album at the 65th Annual Grammy Awards	Won	
2022	Ricky Kej / Stewart Copeland	Divine Tides	Grammy Award for Best New Age Album at the 64th Annual Grammy Awards	Won	
2016	Wouter Kellerman / Featured Artist Ricky Kej (Composer, Arranger, Mixer)	Love Language	Grammy Award for Contemporary Instrumental Album at the 58th Annual Grammy Awards	Nominee (Featured Artist)	
2015	Ricky Kej / Wouter Kellerman	Winds of Samsara	Grammy Award for Best New Age Album at the 57th Annual Grammy Awards	Won	
2015	Paul Avgerinos /Featured Artist Ricky Kej (Keyboardist & Instrumentalist)	Grace	Grammy Award for Best New Age Album at the 58th Annual Grammy Awards	Won(Featured Artist)	
2015	Ciro Hurtado / Featured Artist Ricky Kej (Arranger & Keyboardist)	Ayahuasca Dreams	Nominee at the 16th Annual Latin Grammy Awards	Nominee (Featured Artist)	

=== Lifetime Achievement Awards ===
Year	Recipient	Awarded For	Award
2025	Ricky Kej	Contribution to the Arts	Padma Shri Award
2025	Ricky Kej	Fellowship, Service & Global understanding	Rotary international Sadbhavana Award
2025	Ricky Kej	International Goodwill & Understanding	IGUA Award
2025	Ricky Kej	Lifetime Achievement	Future of India Award 2025
2025	Ricky Kej	Lokmat Sur Jyotsna National Music Award	ICON Award
2024	Ricky Kej	International Advertising Association	Olive Crown Awards
2024	Ricky Kej	Outstanding Contribution and Impact in Art	GQ Man of the Year
2022	Ricky Kej	Awarded at United Nations General Assembly, New York	Excellence and Leadership Award
2022	Ricky Kej	Awarded by former Secretary General of the United Nations, Ban-Ki-Moon	Ban-Ki-Moon Award
2022	Ricky Kej	Rotary Club of Bombay	Shyam Munshi Lifetime Achievement Award
2020	Ricky Kej	GQ Mazagine	GQ Hero
2019	Ricky Kej	Rotary Club	Citizen Extraordinaire Award
2019	Ricky Kej	House of Commons, Canada	Outstanding Musical and Humanitarian Achievement
2017	Ricky Kej	RNRI	Professional Achievement Award

=== Other Notable Awards ===
Year	Recipient	Nominated work	Award	Result	Ref.
2008	Ricky Kej	Jingle - TreesforFree.org	One Show – Advertising	Won	
2009	Ricky Kej	Jingle – Seventy mm Movie Rentals	Adfest Asia Award – Advertising	Won	
2010	Ricky Kej	Jingle – Nike	Cannes Award – Advertising	Nominated	
2013	Ricky Kej	Shanti Orchestra	ZMR Music Award	Nominated	
2013	Ricky Kej	"Forever" from Shanti Orchestra	Hollywood Music in Media (HMMA) Award for Best New Age/ Ambient Song	Nominated	
2015	Ricky Kej / Wouter Kellerman	Winds of Samsara	ZMR Award for Album of the Year	Won	
2015	Ricky Kej / Wouter Kellerman	Winds of Samsara	ZMR Award for Best Contemporary Instrumental Album	Nominated	
2015	Ricky Kej / Wouter Kellerman	Winds of Samsara	ZMR Award for Best World Album	Won	
2015	Ricky Kej / Wouter Kellerman	Winds of Samsara	South African Music Award for Best Producer of the Year	Won	
2015	Ricky Kej / Wouter Kellerman	"Mahatma" from Winds of Samsara	Hollywood Music in Media (HMMA) Award for Best World Song	Nominated	
2015	Ricky Kej / Wouter Kellerman	"New Earth Calling" from Winds of Samsara	Hollywood Music in Media (HMMA) Award for Best New Age/ Ambient Song	Nominated	
2015	Ricky Kej	"Panasonic P81" (Panasonic P81)	Hollywood Music in Media (HMMA) Award for Song/ Score – Commercial Advertisement	Nominated	
2015	Ricky Kej	Global Indian Music Award	Special Recognition for Global Achievement	Won	
2015	Ricky Kej	Mirchi Music Award	Best International Musician	Won	
2015	Ricky Kej	Zee TV Kannada Award	Global Musician Award	Won	
2016	Ricky Kej	"Samsara" from Shanti Samsara	Global Music Awards World Music – India	Won	
2016	Ricky Kej	"Samsara" from Shanti Samsara	International Acoustic Music Awards for Best Open/Acoustic Open Genre	Won	
2016	Ricky Kej	"One Song" from Shanti Samsara	Los Angeles CineFest	Semi-Finalist	
2016	Ricky Kej	"Ganga" from Shanti Samsara	Los Angeles CineFest	Semi-Finalist	
2016	Ricky Kej	Radio One Award	Youth Star Award	Won	
2017	Ricky Kej	"Ganga" from Shanti Samsara	Barcelona International Environmental Film Festival (FICMA)	Won	
2017	Ricky Kej	"Ganga" from Shanti Samsara	SUNCINE	Finalist	
2019	Ricky Kej	"One With Earth Song"	17th Independent Music Awards	Nominated	
2019	Ricky Kej	My Earth Songs	UN SDG Action Awards	Finalist	
2019	Ricky Kej	"One With Earth Song"	Indie Short Fest	Finalist	
2019	Ricky Kej	"One With Earth Song"	CineMagic Film Festival	Won	
2019	Ricky Kej	"One With Earth Song"	Shahu International Film Festival (SIFF)	Won	
2019	Ricky Kej	"One With Earth Song"	Cult Critic Movie Awards	Won	
2019	Ricky Kej	Breathe Life	Shahu International Film Festival (SIFF)	Won	
2020	Ricky Kej	Community Services Art and Culture Award	India Australia Business and Community Awards (IABCA)	Finalist	
2020	Ricky Kej	India Australia Impact Award	India Australia Business and Community Awards (IABCA)	Finalist	
2022	Ricky Kej	Honorary PhD	Kalinga Institute of Social Sciences.		
2022	Ricky Kej	"Green Influencer of the Year"	Minister of Agriculture & Farmers Welfare	Won	
2022	Ricky Kej	United Nations Refugee "Goodwill Ambassador"	UNHCR (United Nations High Commissioner for Refugees)	Won	
2022	Ricky Kej	3-Star Civilian Honor	Awarded by Air Marshal Manavendra Singh	Won	
2023	Ricky Kej	United Nations "Goodwill Ambassador"	UNCCD (United Nations Convention to Combat Desertification)	Won	
2023	Ricky Kej	Most Stylish Music Personality	Hindustan Times Most Stylish 2023	Won	
2025	Ricky Kej / Abby V	Aarambh	Global Music Album of the Year at JUNO	Nominee	

== Discography ==
=== Albums ===
Year	Name	Record label
2025	GANDHI - Mantras of Compassion	Downtown Records
2024	Break of Dawn	Vedam, Universal Music, Verve Records
2023	Aarambh (Abby V with Ricky Kej)	Sufiscore
2023	Police Beyond Borders (with Stewart Copeland)	Kinetic Kollection Overseas Inc.
2021	Divine Tides (with Stewart Copeland)	Kinetic Kollection Overseas Inc.
2020	Wild Karnataka	Ricky Kej Records
2020	Mann Mein Aman	Merchant Records
2020	My Earth Songs	Universal Music
2020	Ek	BToS Productions
2018	Shiva (Ricky Kej LIVE in India)	Strumm Entertainment
2017	Earth Love: Music for Relaxation	Raveolution Studios
2017	Epic Trailer Music	Raveolution Studios
2015	Shanti Samsara – World Music for Environmental Consciousness	Zee Music
2014	Winds of Samsara	Listen 2 Africa
2013	Ballad of Maya	Ricky Kej Records
2013	Fiery Drums Volume 2	EMI - Virgin
2013	Shanti Orchestra	Ricky Kej Records
2013	Kamasutra Lounge – The Deluxe Edition	Varèse Sarabande
2012	Bollywood in the club	EMI - Virgin
2012	Punjabi in the club	EMI - Virgin
2012	Mesmerizing Santoor	EMI - Virgin
2011	Fiery Drums Volume 1	EMI - Virgin
2011	Urban Grooves South India	EMI - Virgin
2011	Mesmerizing Flute	EMI - Virgin
2008	Kamasutra Lounge 2	Universal Music
2007	Kamasutra Lounge	Free Spirit Records
2004	Communicative Art	Free Spirit Records

=== Film soundtracks ===
Year	Film	Language	Note
2008	Accident	Kannada	
2009	Venkata in Sankata	Kannada	
2010	Crazy Kutumba	Kannada	
2019	Wild Karnataka	English	
2022	Who Is Baul	Bengali	
2023	Adrishya Jalakangal	Malayalam	
2023	MR-9	Bengali	
2025	Papa Buka	Tok Pisin	
2025	Wild Tamil Nadu	English/Tamil	

=== Featured compilations ===
- Asha Waali Dhoop (2006)
- Mumbai Spirit (2007)
- Cafe Goa (2007)
- Relaxation DAilleurs (2007)
- Doosha Project (2008)
- Hangzhou Lake (2008)
- Indian Zen (2008)
- Vox Del Taire (2009)
- Chillout Bombay II (2010)
- Chillout Lounge Classics (2010)
- Dance the Golden Years (2010)
- Bollywood Remixed (2010)
- Masters of Fusion (2011)
- Best of 2011–12 Fusion (2012)
- Chillout Flute (2012)
- Best of Fusion- Indian Spirit (2012)
- Party Drums (2013)
- Grace - Paul Avgerinos (2015)
- Ayahuasca Dreams - Ciro Hurtado (2015)
- Love Language - Wouter Kellerman (2015)
- Symphonic Soweto - Wouter Kellerman, Soweto Gospel Choir (2017)
- Ila - The Earth Symphony (2020)

== See also ==
- Jingle
- Music award
- New age music
- Film score
- Safe listening
