= Sudhir Shivaram =

Indian wildlife photographer

- Born: Hassan, Karnataka, India
- Education: Electronics & Communications Engineering
- Alma mater: Malnad College of Engineering
- Occupation: Wildlife photographer
- Spouse: Vasudha Sekhar
- Children: 2
- Call sign: VU2USM
- Website: www.sudhirshivaram.com

Sudhir Shivaram (born 1972) is an Indian photographer. His photography focuses on raising awareness for environmental conservation.

== Biography ==
Shivaram grew up in Karnataka and became interested in wildlife photography in 1993 while studying engineering in Malnad College of Engineering in Hassan, Karnataka. After graduation, he worked for Hewlett-Packard as an engineer and later at APC. Currently, he is a full-time wildlife photography teacher. He was named Sanctuary Asia's "Wildlife Photographer of the Year" for 2012.

Shivaram campaigns for wildlife protection. He was a brand ambassador for Canon. He is the founding member of the non-profit photo sharing site India Nature Watch.

At the 2014 Worldwide Editorial Awards held in Washington D.C., National Geographic Traveler India's September 2013 cover featuring Sudhir's image won the Yellow Border Award for the best cover across 14 language editions of the magazine worldwide.
