= 2011 Cricket World Cup opening ceremony =

The opening ceremony of the 2011 Cricket World Cup took place in Bangladesh at the Bangabandhu National Stadium in Dhaka on February 17, 2011, two days prior to the start of the World Cup. The cost of the opening ceremony was estimated to be US$30 million (£18.6m), the highest in the history of Cricket.

== Performances ==
Following is a list of performances made at the event:

- Ibrar Tipu, Arnob, Mila, Balam, Kona and Elita - O Prithibi Ebar Ese Bangladesh Nao Chine
- Shankar–Ehsaan–Loy – De Ghuma Ke
- Runa Laila
- Sabina Yasmin
- Momtaz Begum
- Sonu Nigam- Let's Go For Glory
- Bathiya and Santhush with Iraj Weeraratne – Lion Nation, Manusathkule.
- Bryan Adams – "Summer of '69", Let's Make a Night to Remember, 18 til I Die

== Countdown and entrance of the captains ==
The opening ceremony started on 6:00 pm (Local Time) when the prime minister of Bangladesh Sheikh Hasina arrived and was welcomed by handing a water-lily, then the Chayanath choir wearing red and green saris and fatua sang the National Anthem of Bangladesh. After the singing of anthem the countdown began which showed a montage of all the scenes of the previous world cup. Popular Bangladeshi pop singers Mila, Balam and others sang the song "O Prithibi Ebar Ese Bangladesh Nao Chine" (Oh World!) which was enjoyed both by local and foreigners. Stumpy, the tournament mascot, was escorted into the ground, on a cycle rickshaw, then pedal-powered cycle rickshaws escorted each of the captains into the center. The captains were accompanied by young children who wore the jersey of the team they were with. The captains assembled at the dais and fireworks take off from the stadium. Indian popular singer Sonu Nigam sang Spirit of Cricket in the dais. After Sonu's song a video footage was shown on the big screen which showed Sangakkara and Sehwag promoting AIDS awareness.

Mustafa Kamal, the chairman of the BCB delivers his speech at first in English and then in Bengali.

ICC chief Sharad Pawar walks up and delivered his speech. After that Bangladesh PM Sheikh Hasina delivered her speech and declared the opening of World Cup.

== Cultural programme ==
After the opening the cultural program showcasing the heritages of India, Sri Lanka and the Bangladesh's performance. The music for the cultural section was composed by Ricky Kej. Electronic kites were being flown above the stadium, then a 3-D electronic depiction of the World Cup on a building outside the stadium was shown. The cup was gone and an image of the Bangabandhu stadium was displayed. A cricket match was being shown; after the display the cultural show began.

=== Ending ===
Canadian rock singer Bryan Adams performed his famous song "Summer of '69" and "18 til I Die". At the end Shankar–Ehsaan–Loy sang the tournament's official song "De Ghuma Ke".

== Telecast ==
ESPN, the official broadcasters of the ICC events, produced the telecast of the opening ceremony. Various channels throughout the world used the downlink feed of ESPN's production to provide their respective viewers, live broadcast of the ceremony.
