= Pradeep Hegde =

Indian conservation filmmaker

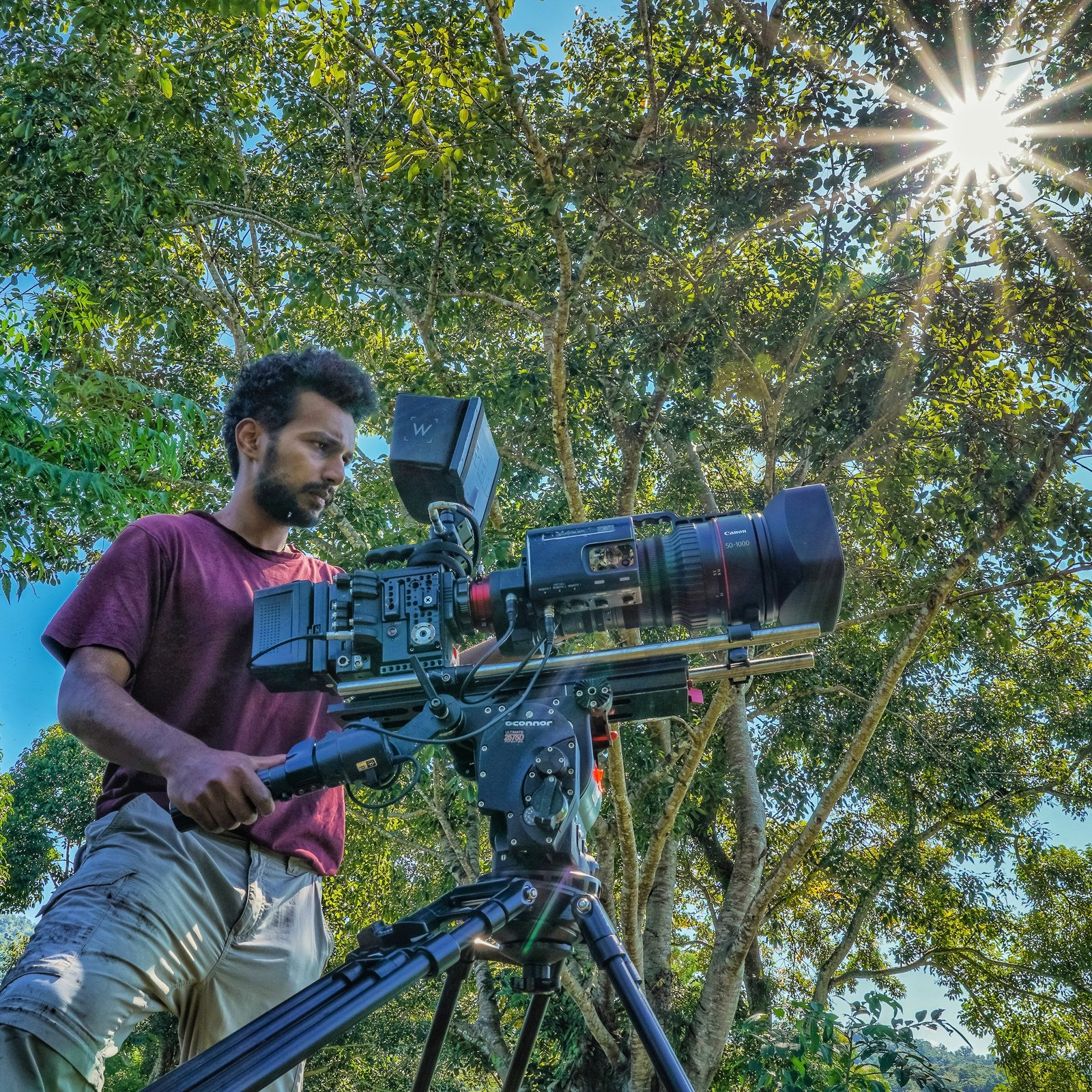
- Born: Sirsi, Karnataka, India
- Citizenship: India
- Education: Masters in Life Science
- Years active: 2014-present
- Employer: Kiang Collective LLP
- Notable work: Wild Karnataka
- Website: https://pradeephegde.in/

Pradeep Hegde is a wildlife cameraman and conservation filmmaker from Bangalore, India whose films have been played in several international film festivals. He has worked on several wildlife films and documentaries which were broadcast on Animal planet, Discovery and National Geographic.. He has traveled extensively in India and abroad including Bhutan and Singapore for filming wildlife.

In 2024 he founded Kiang collective, a company based in Bangalore which produces natural history films and curates wildlife expeditions across India. Through Kiang Collective, he has been leading snow leopard expeditions since 2025.

== Early life ==
Pradeep Hegde was born in Sirsi, Karnataka to an agriculturist family. He completed his schooling from Government Primary School, Guntkal and Modern Educational Society, Sirsi. Later he completed his pre-university from Chaitanya PU Colleges Sirsi and later bachelor's degree in life sciences from Christ University, Bangalore.

== Filmography ==
- Wild Tamilnadu
- Wild Karnataka
- Into the Wild India
- The Last Hop(e)
- Raptors

== Awards ==
- Special Mention, Nature in Focus 2019
- Selected-Lift Off Sessions
- Selected- Films South Asia
- Winner- Indic Film Festival
- International Science Film Festival of India
- Winner- Alt. Eff Film Festival

== Books ==
- Guhanagari A Book on Urban Wildlife
