= The X Factor (Australian TV series) discography =

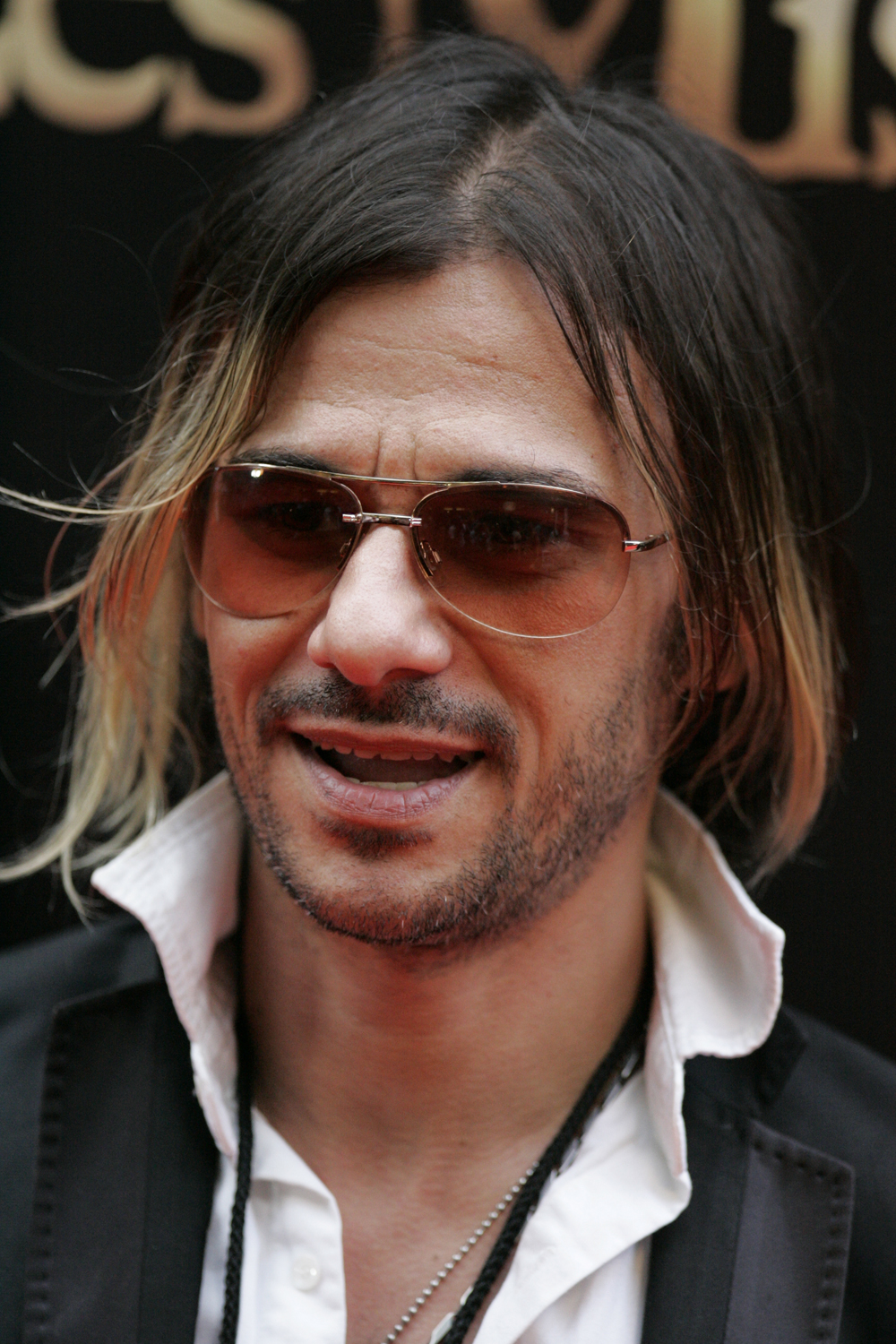
Season two winner Altiyan Childs has achieved a top-five album (Altiyan Childs) and a top-ten single ("Somewhere in the World").

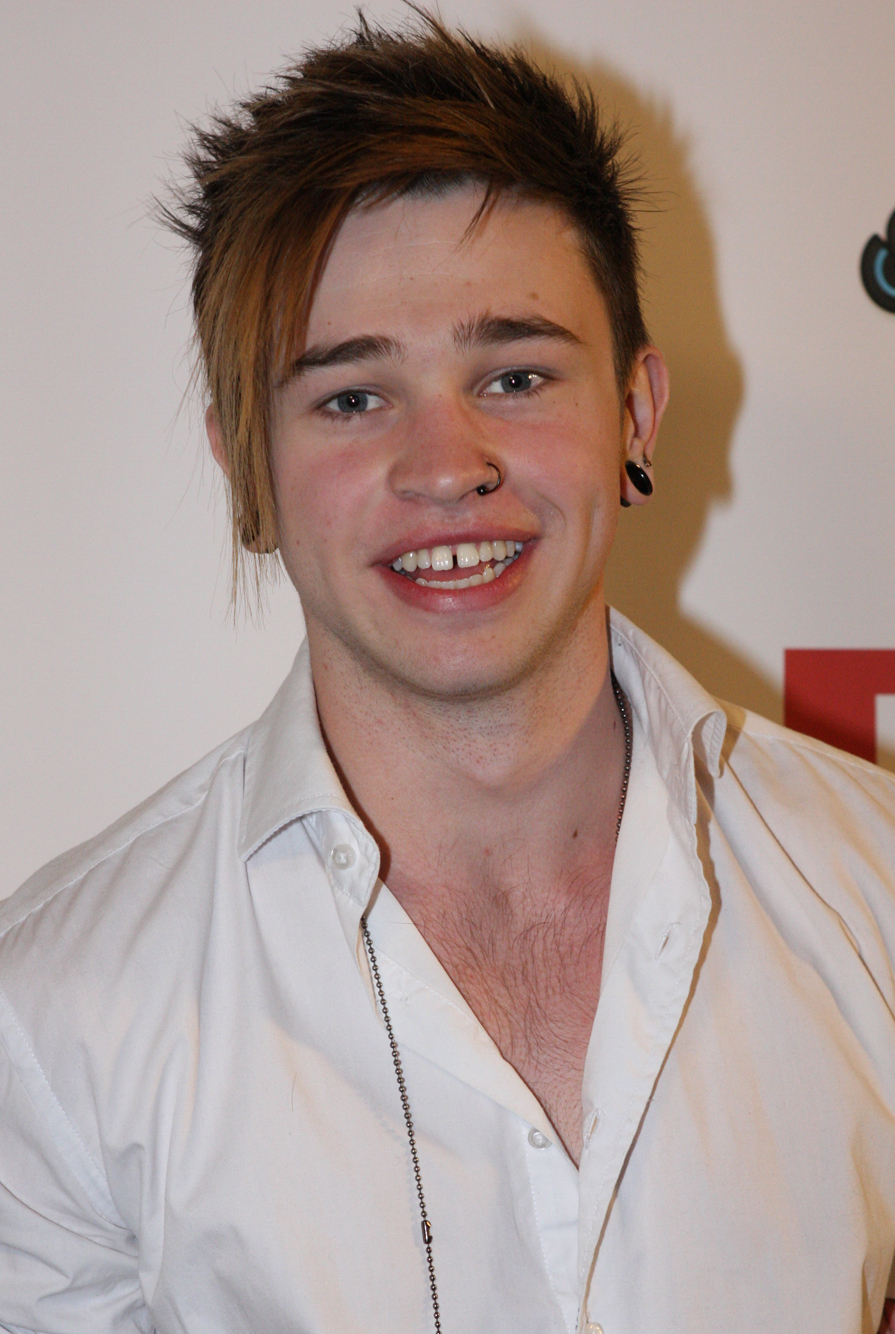
Season three winner and most successful contestant Reece Mastin has achieved three top-fifteen albums (including two top-fives) and four top-twenty singles (including three number-ones).

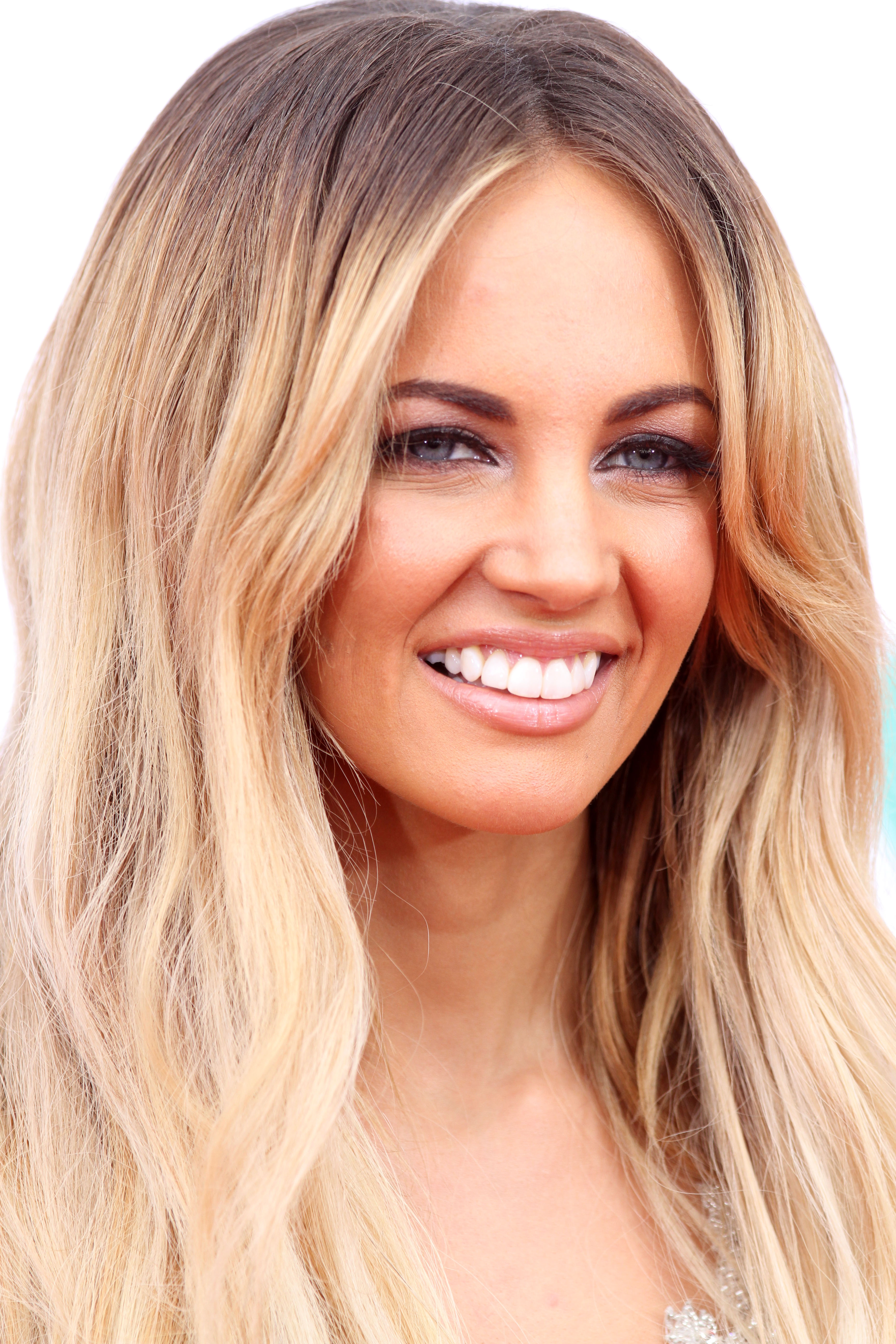
Season four winner Samantha Jade has achieved five top-twenty songs (including a number-one) and a top-five album (Samantha Jade).

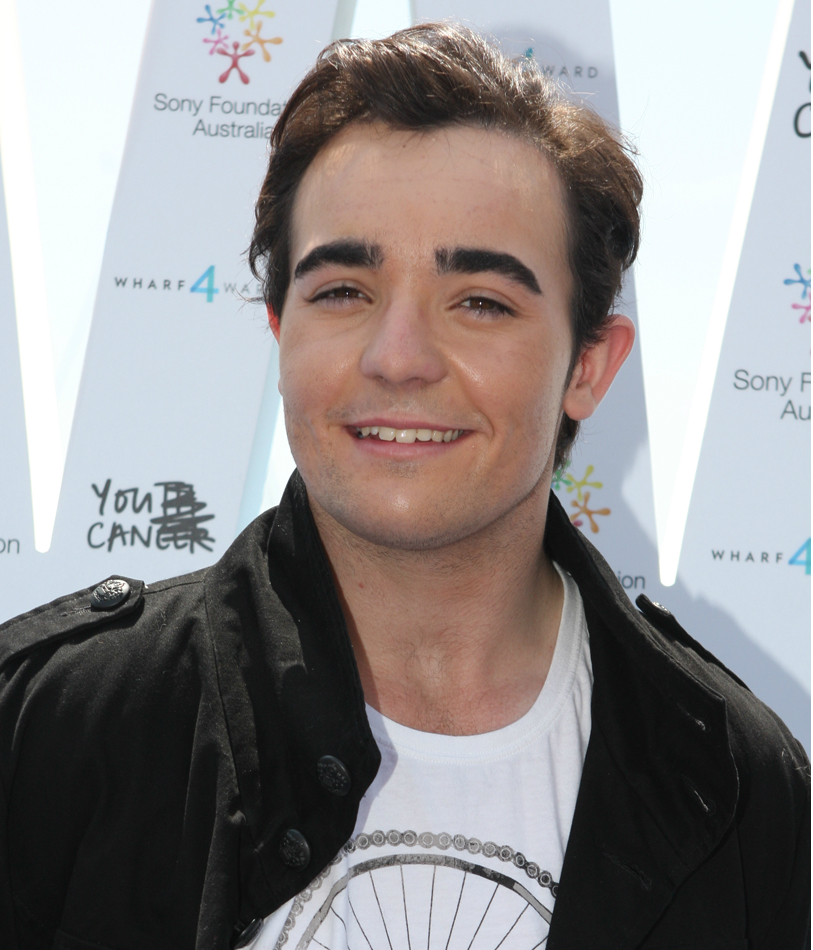
Season four runner-up Jason Owen has achieved two top-ten albums.

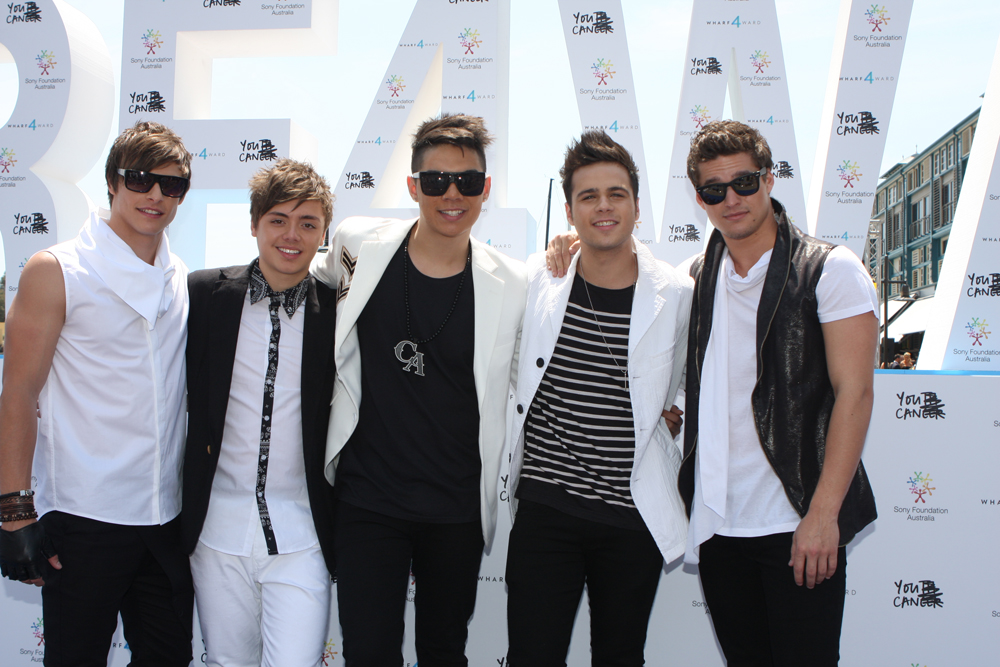
The Collective, who came third in season four, have achieved a top-ten single ("Surrender") and a top-fifteen album (The Collective).

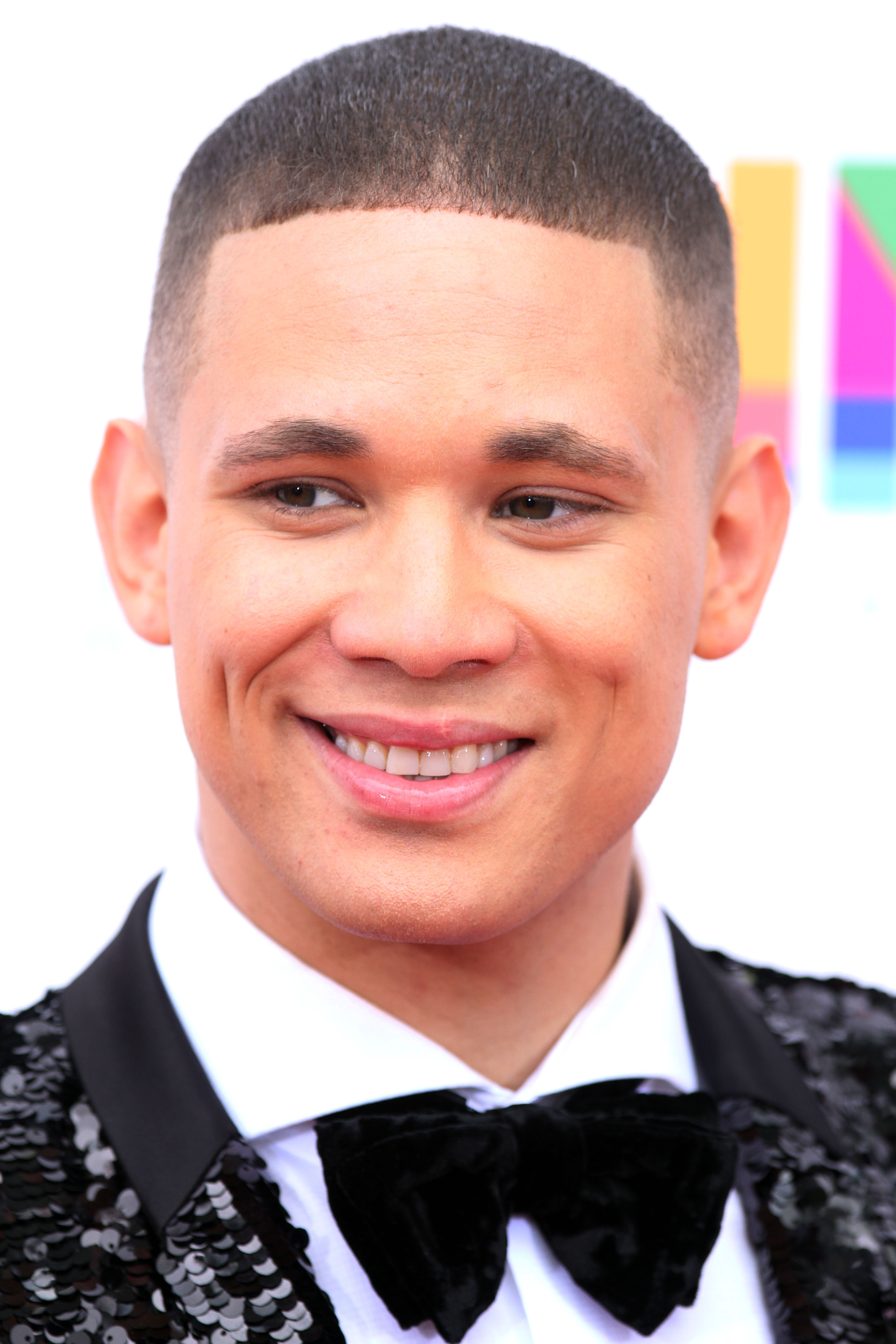
Nathaniel Willemse, who came sixth in season four, has achieved two top-five singles and a top-five album.

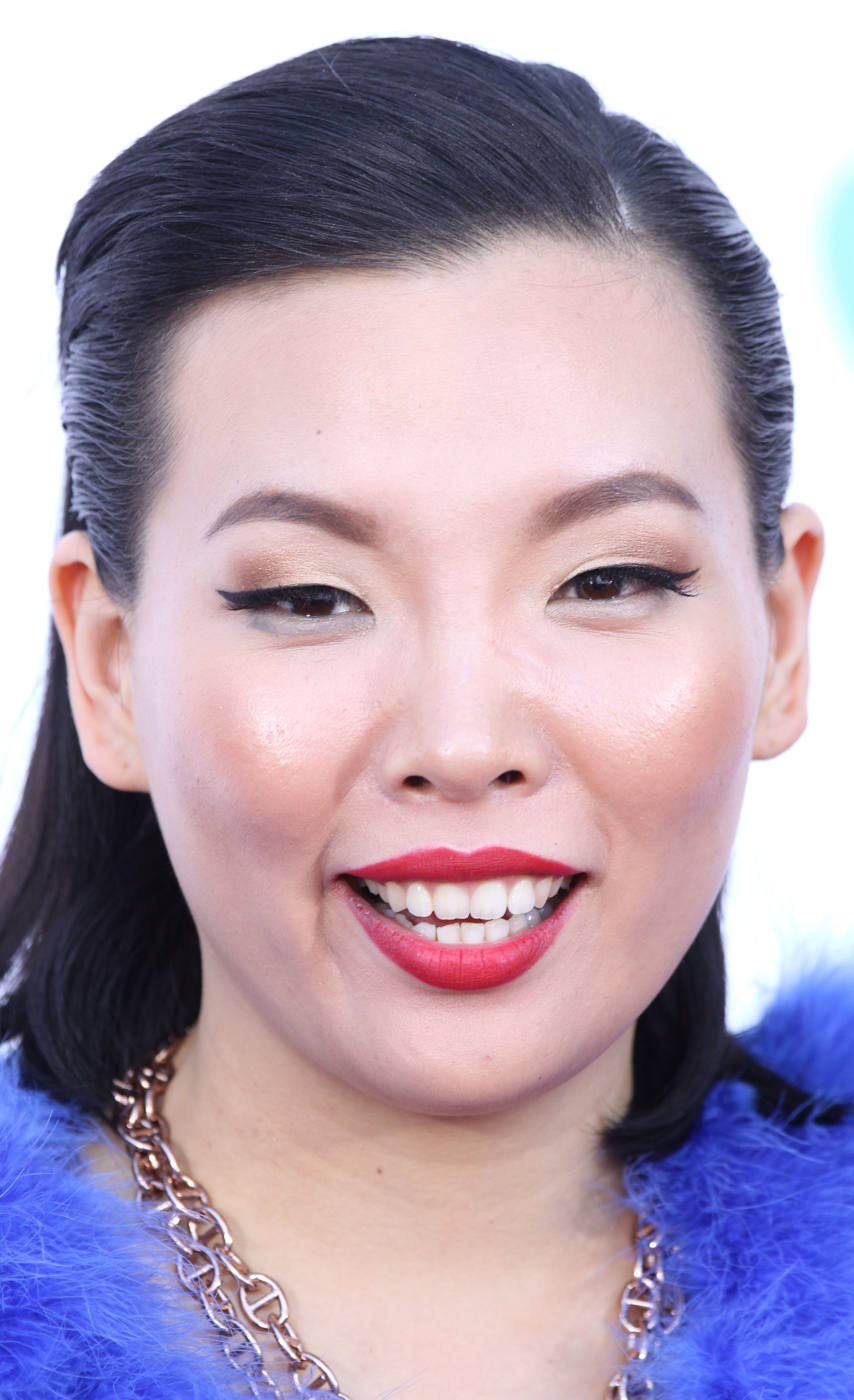
Season five winner Dami Im has achieved three top-ten albums (including a number-one) and four top-twenty songs (including a number-one).

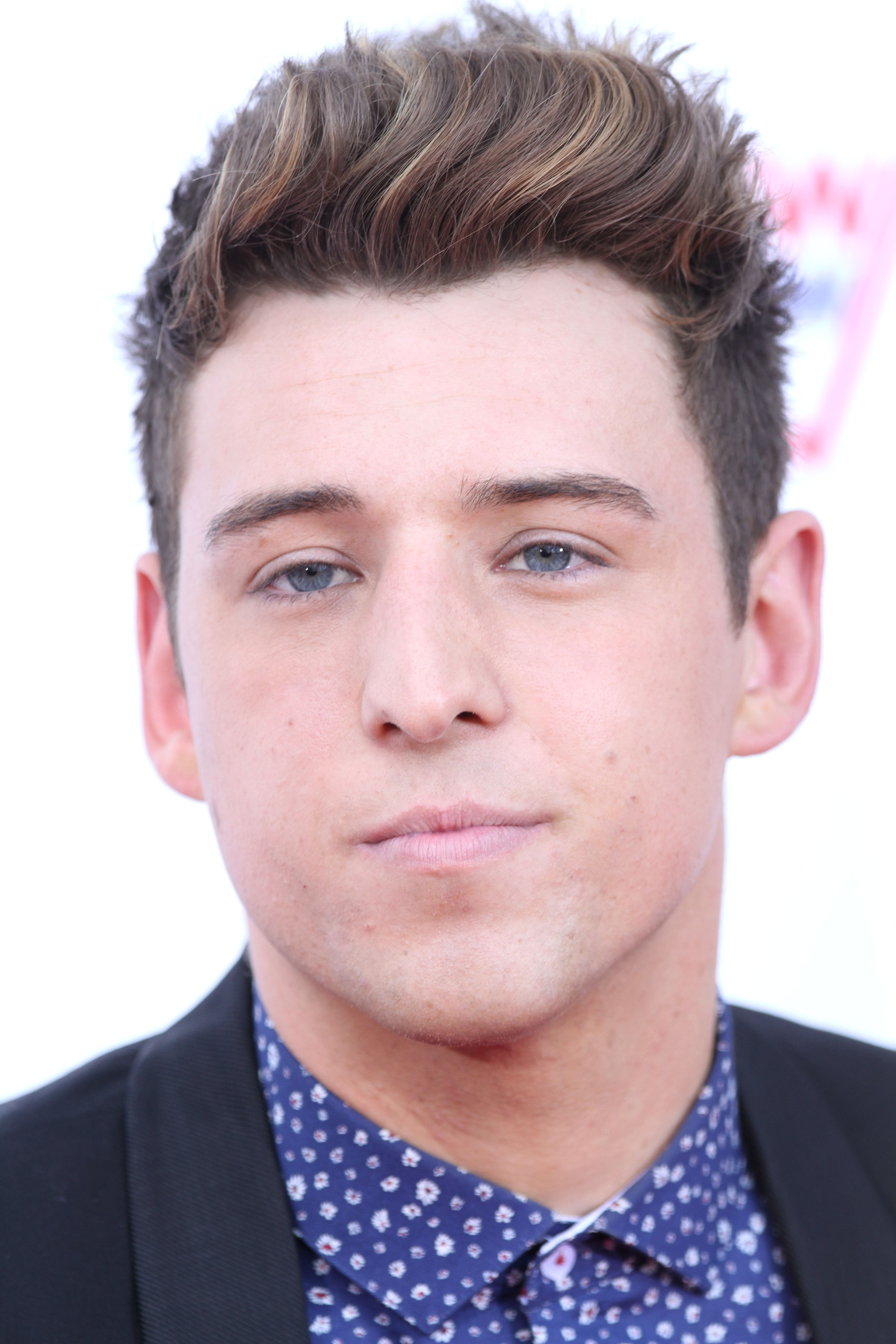
Season five runner-up Taylor Henderson has achieved two number-one albums and three top-five songs (including a number-one).

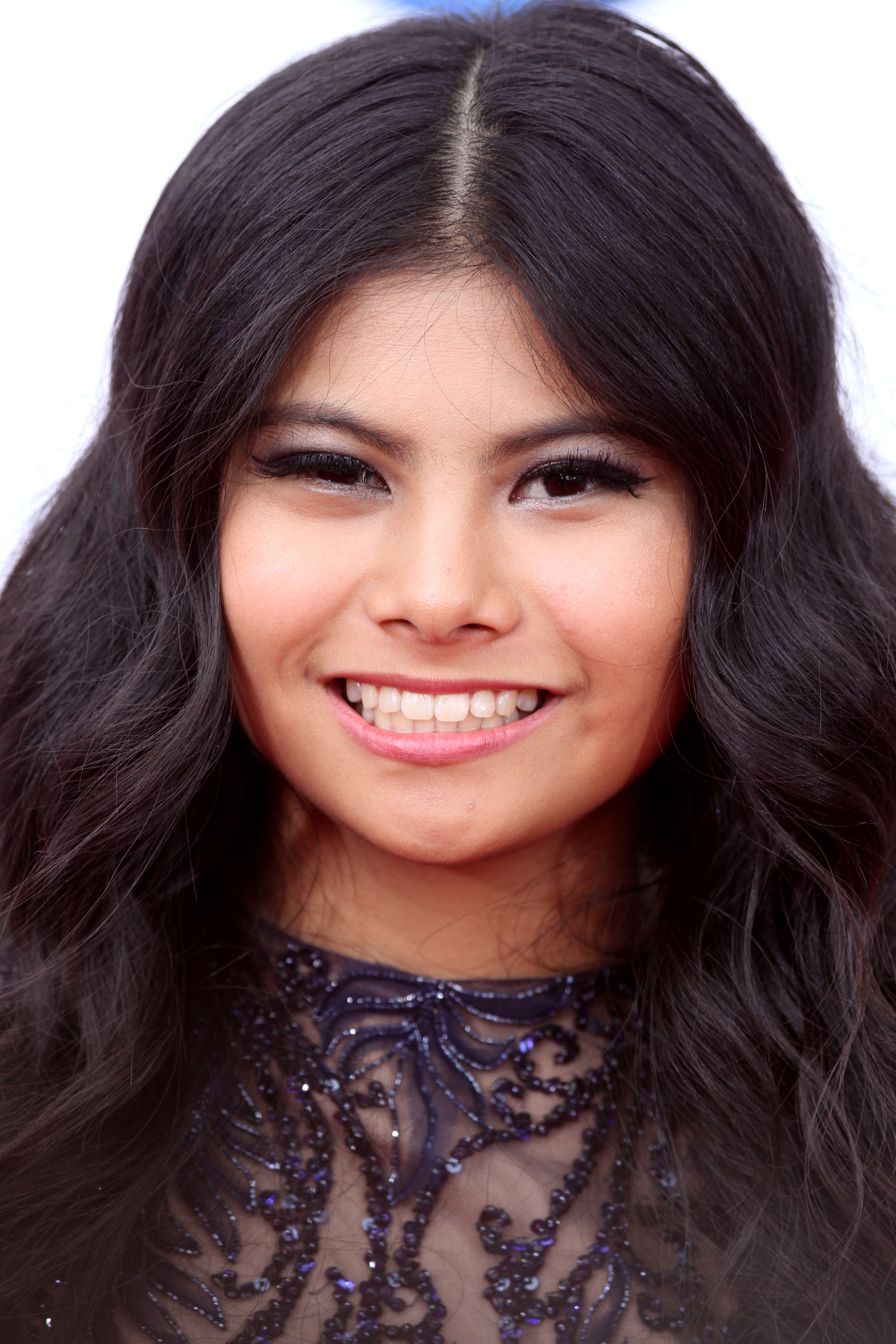
Season six winner Marlisa Punzalan has achieved a top-five single ("Stand by You") and a top-ten album (Marlisa).

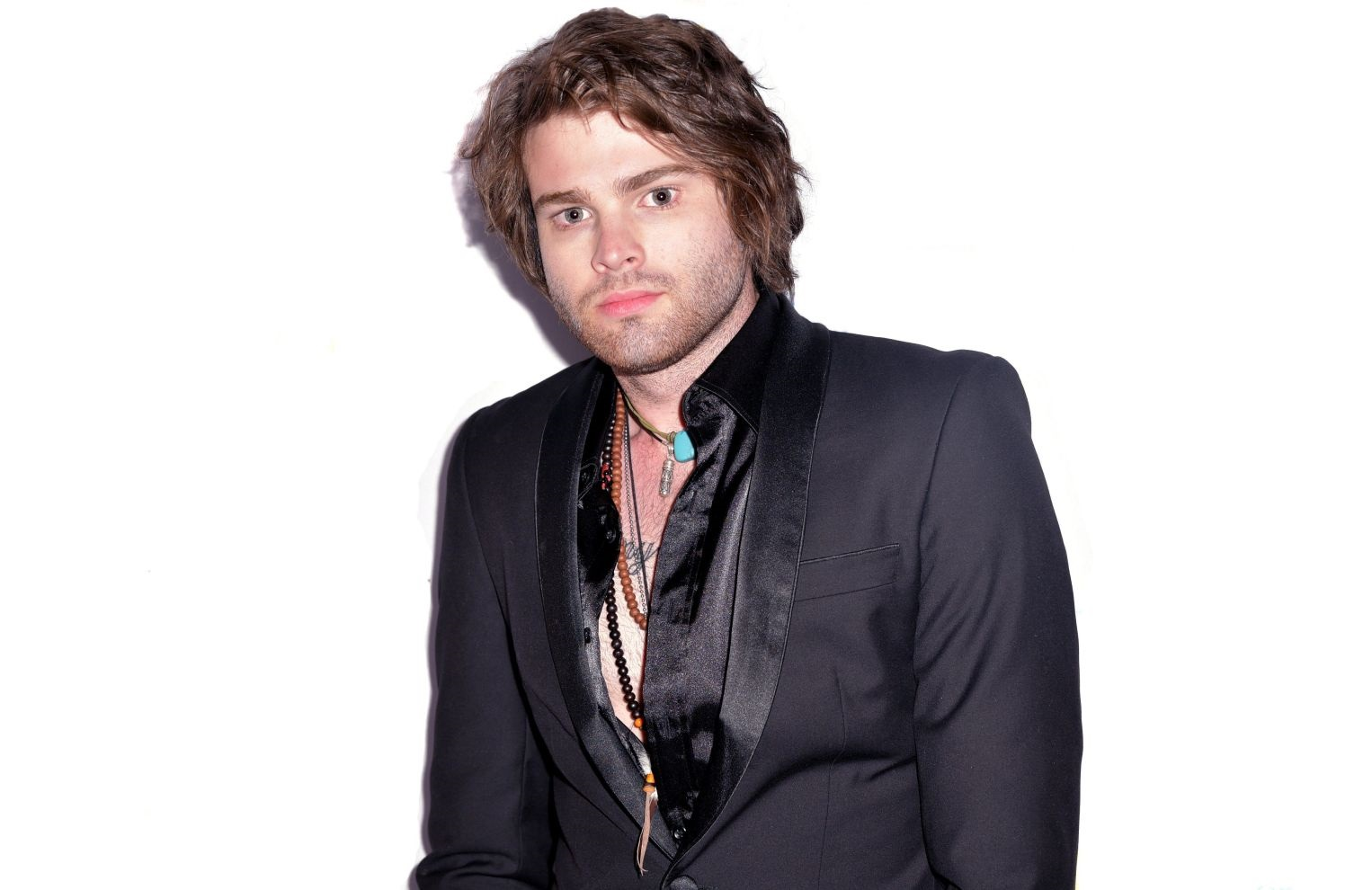
Season six runner-up Dean Ray has achieved a top-five single ("Coming Back") and a top-five album (Dean Ray).

The discography of The X Factor Australia consists of music releases from contestants of the show. While some contestants have been signed to record labels, others have released their music independently. Since season one, contestants have achieved commercial success on the Australian ARIA Charts, with thirteen top-ten albums (including three number-ones), eighteen top-ten songs (including five number-ones), and twenty-nine platinum and thirteen gold certifications.

Eleven acts have charted outside Australia, most notably Mastin and season two winner Altiyan Childs who have both reached the top ten in New Zealand with their albums and singles, and season five winner Dami Im whose albums and singles have charted in South Korea. Recordings of contestants' weekly performances from The X Factor live shows have been released onto the iTunes Store since season three, and eighty-six of those performances have charted on the ARIA Singles Chart.

== Albums ==
=== Studio albums ===
Artist	Season	Title	Release date	Peak chart positions				Certifications
Artist	Season	Title	Release date	AUS	KOR	NZ	SWE	Certifications
Random	1	Random	10 October 2005	79	—	—	—	
Altiyan Childs	2	Altiyan Childs	10 December 2010	3	—	3	—	ARIA: Platinum; RMNZ: Platinum
Vince Harder	1	The Space Between Us	28 March 2011	—	—	—	—	
Reece Mastin	3	Reece Mastin	9 December 2011	2	—	1	—	ARIA: 2× Platinum; RMNZ: Gold
Andrew Wishart	3	It's Never Too Late	4 May 2012	30	—	—	—	
Reece Mastin	3	Beautiful Nightmare	19 October 2012	3	—	2	—	ARIA: Gold; RMNZ: Gold
Samantha Jade	4	Samantha Jade	7 December 2012	3	—	—	—	ARIA: Gold
The Collective	4	The Collective	14 December 2012	11	—	—	—	ARIA: Gold
Jason Owen	4	Life is a Highway	26 April 2013	5	—	—	—	
Dami Im	5	Dami Im	15 November 2013	1	9	—	—	ARIA: Platinum
Taylor Henderson	5	Taylor Henderson	29 November 2013	1	—	—	—	ARIA: Platinum
JTR	5	Touchdown	7 March 2014	44	—	—	52	
Taylor Henderson	5	Burnt Letters	11 July 2014	1	—	—	—	ARIA: Gold
Dami Im	5	Heart Beats	17 October 2014	7	32	—	—	
Marlisa Punzalan	6	Marlisa	7 November 2014	6	—	11	—	ARIA: Gold
Dean Ray	6	Dean Ray	21 November 2014	5	—	21	—	ARIA: Gold
Jason Owen	4	Friday Night	6 March 2015	9	—	—	—	
Altiyan Childs	2	Born Before the Sun	27 September 2015	—	—	—	—	
Reece Mastin	3	Change Colours	9 October 2015	12	—	—	—	
Nathaniel Willemse	4	Yours	23 October 2015	5	—	—	—	
Samantha Jade	4	Nine	20 November 2015	11	—	—	—	
Cyrus Villanueva	7	Cyrus	9 December 2015	9	—	—	—	ARIA: Gold
Louise Adams	7	Louise Adams	13 December 2015	22	—	—	—	
Jess & Matt	7	Jess & Matt	16 December 2015	9	—	—	—	
Brothers3	6	Brothers Never Part	15 January 2016	11	—	—	—	
Dami Im	5	Classic Carpenters	22 April 2016	3	23	—	—	ARIA: Gold
Jason Owen	4	Proud	6 May 2016	—	—	—	—	
Isaiah Firebrace	8	Isaiah	9 December 2016	12	5	—	—	
Dami Im	5	I Hear a Song	23 March 2018	3	11	—	—	
Samantha Jade	4	Best of My Love	20 April 2018	6	—	—	—	
Samantha Jade	4	The Magic of Christmas	2 November 2018	20	—	—	—	
"—" denotes an album that did not chart in that country.

=== Compilation albums ===
Title	Album details	Peak chart positions
Title	Album details	AUS
X Factor All Stars	Released 13 September 2013; Label: Sony Music Australia; Formats: CD, digital download	—
"—" denotes an album that did not chart.

=== Extended plays ===
Artist	Season	Title	Release date	Peak chart positions	
Artist	Season	Title	Release date	AUS	NZ
Luke and Joel	2	L & J	20 January 2011^{[a]}	—	—
Christina Parie	3	16 & Unstoppable	27 July 2012	—	—
Jai Waetford	5	Jai Waetford EP	6 December 2013	21	—
Jai Waetford	5	Get to Know You	28 March 2014	—	—
Adil Memon	4	In the Night	4 April 2014	—	—
Taylor Henderson	5	The Acoustic Sessions	4 July 2014	—	—
Reigan Derry	6	All of the Pieces	12 December 2014	—	—
Jai Waetford	5	Shy	16 January 2015	—	—
Reece Mastin	3	Rebel and the Reason	1 May 2015	—	37
Caitlyn Shadbolt	6	Caitlyn Shadbolt EP	21 August 2015	50	—
Reigan Derry	6	December	11 December 2015	—	—
In Stereo	7	She's Rock n Roll	1 April 2016	11	—
Jai Waetford	5	Heart Miles	3 June 2016	24	—
In Stereo	7	The Speed of Sound	1 July 2016	—	—
Jai Waetford	5	Heart Miles	3 June 2016	24	—
Dami Im	5	Live Sessions EP	11 January 2019	29	—
"—" denotes an EP that did not chart.

== Singles ==
=== Season one contestants ===
Artist(s)	Title	Release date	Peak chart positions		Certifications
Artist(s)	Title	Release date	AUS	NZ	Certifications
Random	"Put Your Hands Up"	10 June 2005	7	—	
Random	"Are You Ready"	2 September 2005	36	—	
Vince Harder	"Strobelight"	5 September 2008	—	—	
Vince Harder	"Lyrical Love"	11 September 2009	—	—	
Vince Harder	"Say This With Me"	29 March 2010	—	39	
Vince Harder (featuring K.One)	"Alone No More"	9 August 2010	—	—	
Vince Harder (featuring Young Sid)	"Summer Dayz"	6 December 2010	—	—	
Vince Harder	"I Want This Forever"	28 February 2011	—	—	
Jacob Butler	"Coma"	11 August 2011	—	—	
Vince Harder (featuring PNC and Tyson Tyler)	"Hands Up"	22 August 2011	—	—	
Vince Harder (featuring K.One, P-Money, and Dan Aux)	"It's the Life"	12 December 2011	—	—	
Vince Harder	"Far from Here"	3 August 2012	—	—	
Jacob Butler	"Mind Waltz"	21 September 2012	—	—	
Jacob Butler	"Get Right Round"	14 February 2014	—	—	
"—" denotes a single that did not chart in that country.

=== Season two contestants ===
Artist(s)	Title	Release date	Peak chart positions		Certifications
Artist(s)	Title	Release date	AUS	NZ	Certifications
Altiyan Childs	"Somewhere in the World"	22 November 2010	8	5	ARIA: Platinum
Sally Chatfield (featuring Jae Maree)	"Recovery"	28 February 2011^{[B]}	—	—	
Mahogany	"Thank You"	4 March 2011	—	—	
Mahogany	"New Zealand (My Home Town)"	28 March 2011	—	—	
Altiyan Childs	"Ordinary Man"	23 September 2011	55	—	
Luke and Joel	"What You Want"	16 December 2011	—	—	
Altiyan Childs	"Headlines"	30 November 2012	—	—	
Altiyan Childs	"Dreams"	20 December 2013	—	—	
Altiyan Childs	"Celebrity"	4 July 2014	—	—	
Altiyan Childs	"Girl"	13 March 2014	—	—	
Altiyan Childs	"Water"	11 December 2014	—	—	
Altiyan Childs	"Rise Up"	17 March 2015	—	—	
Altiyan Childs	"Kiss Me"	30 June 2015	—	—	
"—" denotes a single that did not chart in that country.

=== Season three contestants ===
Artist(s)	Title	Release date	Peak chart positions		Certifications
Artist(s)	Title	Release date	AUS	NZ	Certifications
Reece Mastin	"Good Night"	22 November 2011	1	1	ARIA: 5× Platinum; RMNZ: Platinum
Young Men Society	"We Own the Night"	16 March 2012	—	28	
Reece Mastin	"Shut Up & Kiss Me"	20 April 2012	2	1	ARIA: Platinum; RMNZ: Gold
Johnny Ruffo	"On Top"	15 June 2012	14	—	ARIA: Platinum
Reece Mastin	"Shout It Out"	29 June 2012	1	8	ARIA: Platinum
Christina Parie	"16 & Unstoppable"	13 July 2012	69	—	
Audio Vixen	"Morning of My Life"	6 August 2012	—	—	
Reece Mastin	"Rock Star"	5 October 2012	16	14	ARIA: Platinum
Declan Sykes	"Need Your Lovin"	10 October 2012	—	—	
Andrew Wishart	"Bare Upon You"	17 October 2012	—	—	
Johnny Ruffo	"Take It Home"	19 October 2012	30	—	ARIA: Gold
Reece Mastin	"Timeless"	1 March 2013	85	—	
Johnny Ruffo	"Untouchable"	12 July 2013	39	—	
Reece Mastin	"Girls (All Around the World)"	25 October 2013	59	—	
KYA (with LDN Noise)	"What I Live For"	2 May 2014	65	—	
Reece Mastin	"Rebel and the Reason"	27 March 2015	51	—	
Johnny Ruffo	"She Got That O"	15 May 2015	—	—	
Reece Mastin	"Even Angels Cry"	2 October 2015	—	—	
"—" denotes a single that did not chart in that country.

=== Season four contestants ===
Artist(s)	Title	Release date	Peak chart positions			Certifications
Artist(s)	Title	Release date	AUS	KOR	NZ	Certifications
Samantha Jade	"What You've Done to Me"	20 November 2012	1	40	—	ARIA: 3× Platinum
Jason Owen	"Make It Last"	23 November 2012	47	—	—	
The Collective	"Surrender"	23 November 2012	6	—	—	ARIA: Gold
Bella Ferraro	"Set Me on Fire"	14 December 2012	36	—	—	
The Collective	"Last Christmas"	14 December 2012	—	—	—	
Adil Memon	"Love I Can Afford"	14 February 2013	—	—	—	
Fourtunate	"Best Thing Ever"	27 April 2013	—	—	—	
Samantha Jade	"Firestarter"	28 June 2013	9	56	—	ARIA: Platinum
The Collective	"Another Life"	28 June 2013	47	—	—	
What About Tonight	"Time of Our Lives"	26 July 2013	25	—	—	
Adil Memon	"Official"	16 August 2013	—	—	—	
Samantha Jade (with Novita Dewi)	"Breakeven"	25 August 2013	—	—	—	
Nathaniel Willemse	"You"	27 September 2013	4	—	16	ARIA: 2× Platinum
Bella Ferraro (featuring Will Singe)	"Forgot You"	18 October 2013	75	—	—	
Samantha Jade	"Soldier"	15 November 2013	17	—	—	ARIA: Gold
Nathaniel Willemse	"You're Beautiful"	28 February 2014	14	—	—	
Samantha Jade	"Up!"	11 April 2014	18	—	—	ARIA: Gold
The Collective	"Burn the Bright Lights"	30 May 2014	34	—	—	
The Collective	"Lazy Love"	4 July 2014	—	—	—	
The Collective	"Problem"	4 July 2014	—	—	—	
Jason Owen	"Damn Right"	29 August 2014	—	—	—	
Nathaniel Willemse	"Live Louder"	5 September 2014	4	—	—	ARIA: 2× Platinum
The Collective	"The Good Life"	19 September 2014	74	—	—	
Samantha Jade	"Sweet Talk"	21 November 2014	38	—	—	
Nathaniel Willemse	"Flava"	17 April 2015	—	—	—	
Samantha Jade (featuring Pitbull)	"Shake That"	17 July 2015	32	—	—	
Nathaniel Willemse	"Always Be Yours"	9 October 2015	79	—	—	
Samantha Jade	"Always"	26 February 2016	28	—	—	
Samantha Jade	"Only Just Began"	July 2016	—	—	—	
"—" denotes a single that did not chart in that country.

=== Season five contestants ===
Artist(s)	Title	Release date	Peak chart positions										Certifications
Artist(s)	Title	Release date	AUS	AUT	FRA	GER	KOR	NL	SPA	SWE	SWI	UK	Certifications
Dami Im	"Alive"	28 October 2013	1	—	—	—	29	—	—	—	—	—	ARIA: Platinum
Taylor Henderson	"Borrow My Heart"	1 November 2013	1	—	—	—	—	—	—	—	—	—	ARIA: 2× Platinum
Jai Waetford	"Your Eyes"	1 November 2013	6	—	—	—	—	—	—	—	—	—	ARIA: Gold
Third Degree	"Different Kind of Love"	1 November 2013	22	—	—	—	—	—	—	—	—	—	
JTR	"Ride"	3 February 2014	—	—	—	—	—	—	—	—	—	—	
Taylor Henderson	"When You Were Mine"	7 March 2014	5	—	—	—	—	—	—	—	—	—	ARIA: Platinum
Dami Im	"Jolene (Acoustic)"	7 March 2014	—	—	—	—	—	—	—	—	—	—	
Jai Waetford	"Get to Know You"	28 March 2014	32	—	—	—	—	—	—	—	—	—	
Joelle Hadjia	"Save Me"	15 April 2014	56	—	—	—	—	—	—	—	—	—	
Dami Im	"Super Love"	16 May 2014	11	—	—	—	16	—	—	—	—	—	ARIA: Platinum
The Clique	"Live the Life"	12 June 2014	—	—	—	—	—	—	—	—	—	—	
Taylor Henderson	"Already Gone"	20 June 2014	42	—	—	—	—	—	—	—	—	—	
Dami Im	"Gladiator"	8 August 2014	11	—	—	—	—	—	—	—	—	—	ARIA: Gold
Taylor Henderson	"Host of Angels"	18 September 2014	55	—	—	—	—	—	—	—	—	—	
Dami Im	"Living Dangerously"	9 October 2014	—	—	—	—	—	—	—	—	—	—	
JTR	"Night for Life"	9 October 2014	—	—	—	—	—	—	—	—	—	—	
Joelle Hadjia	"Balance"	19 November 2014	—	—	—	—	—	—	—	—	—	—	
Taylor Henderson	"Brighter Days"	26 November 2014	—	—	—	—	—	—	—	—	—	—	
Jai Waetford	"Shy"	12 December 2014	54	—	—	—	—	—	—	—	—	—	
Joelle Hadjia	"Wish I Never"	19 May 2015	85	—	—	—	—	—	—	—	—	—	
Dami Im	"Smile"	29 May 2015	48	—	—	—	63	—	—	—	—	—	
Dami Im	"Sound of Silence"	11 March 2016	5	39	69	57	—	100	37	17	55	160	ARIA: Gold; IFPI SWE: Gold
"—" denotes a single that did not chart in that country.

=== Season six contestants ===
Artist(s)	Title	Release date	Peak chart positions		Certifications
Artist(s)	Title	Release date	AUS	NZ	Certifications
Marlisa Punzalan	"Stand by You"	20 October 2014	2	21	ARIA: Platinum
Brothers3	"The Lucky Ones"	24 October 2014	29	—	
Dean Ray	"Coming Back"	24 October 2014	5	—	
Reigan Derry	"All of the Pieces"	27 November 2014	33	—	
Caitlyn Shadbolt	"Maps Out the Window"	17 January 2015	—	—	
Sydnee Carter	"Under My Skin"	29 January 2015	—	—	
Dean Ray	"Me and You"	17 March 2015	—	—	
Marlisa Punzalan	"Unstoppable"	12 June 2015	—	—	
Dean Ray	"I O U (A Heartache)"	31 July 2015	—	—	
Reigan Derry	"Feels Like Heaven"	4 September 2015	37	—	
Brothers3	"Brothers Never Part"	11 September 2015	—	—	
Marlisa Punzalan	"Forever Young"	6 November 2015	72	—	
"—" denotes a single that did not chart in that country.

=== Season seven contestants ===
Artist(s)	Title	Release date	Peak chart positions	Certifications
Artist(s)	Title	Release date	AUS	Certifications
Cyrus Villanueva	"Stone"	24 November 2015	4	ARIA: Gold
Jess & Matt	"Nothing Matters"	30 November 2015	29	
Louise Adams	"History"	30 November 2015	91	
Cyrus Villanueva	"Keep Talking"	12 February 2016	44	
In Stereo	"Honest" (with James Yammouni)	19 February 2016	51	
Jess & Matt	"Bones"	29 July 2016		
Natalie Conway	"Everybody's Free (To Feel Good)"	19 August 2016		
"—" denotes a single that did not chart.

=== Season eight contestants ===
Artist(s)	Title	Release date	Peak chart positions	Certifications
Artist(s)	Title	Release date	AUS	Certifications
Isaiah Firebrace	"It's Gotta Be You"	21 November 2016	26	
Isaiah Firebrace	"Don't Come Easy"	8 March 2017	69	
"—" denotes a single that did not chart.

== Other singles ==
=== Charity singles ===
Artist(s)	Series	Title	Release date	Peak chart positions	Charity
Artist(s)	Series	Title	Release date	AUS	Charity
The X Factor Top 12 finalists	4	"Call Me Maybe"	18 September 2012^{[C]}	—	Sony Foundation
The X Factor Top 6 finalists (with Justice Crew)	6	"Happy"	29 September 2014	—	Sony Foundation
"—" denotes a charity single that did not chart.

=== Collaborative singles ===
Artist(s)	Title	Release date	Peak chart positions
Artist(s)	Title	Release date	AUS
Dami Im, Jessica Mauboy, Justice Crew, Nathaniel Willemse, Samantha Jade and Taylor Henderson	"I Am Australian"	24 January 2014	51

=== Promotional singles ===
Artist(s)	Series	Title	Release date	Peak chart positions
Artist(s)	Series	Title	Release date	AUS
Dami Im	5	"Heart Beats Again"	30 September 2014	92

== Other charted songs ==
=== Season four performances ===
Artist	Title	Peak chart positions
Artist	Title	AUS
The Collective	"Domino"	35
Bella Ferraro	"What Makes You Beautiful"	62
The Collective	"Footloose"	41
What About Tonight	"Year 3000"	97
Bella Ferraro	"Big Yellow Taxi"	84
The Collective	"You Got It (The Right Stuff)"	78
Nathaniel Willemse	"The Scientist"	75
The Collective	"Like a Prayer"	65
The Collective	"Lego House"	70
Bella Ferraro	"Sweet Disposition"	59
Nathaniel Willemse	"Red"	91
Bella Ferraro	"Dreams"	82
The Collective	"Beauty and a Beat"	94
Bella Ferraro	"The Last Day on Earth"	90
Samantha Jade	"Stronger (What Doesn't Kill You)"	96
Samantha Jade	"Heartless"	12
Samantha Jade	"Where Have You Been"	51
The Collective	"Apologize"	47
The Collective	"Yeah 3x"	72
Samantha Jade	"Breakeven"	87

=== Season five performances ===
Artist	Title	Peak chart positions	Certifications
Artist	Title	AUS	Certifications
Dami Im	"One"	42	
Jai Waetford	"Fix You"	55	
Taylor Henderson	"I Won't Let You Go"	84	
Dami Im	"Purple Rain"	29	
Jiordan Tolli	"Thriller"	63	
Taylor Henderson	"I Will Wait"	64	
Dami Im	"Don't Leave Me This Way"	67	
Jai Waetford	"The Way You Make Me Feel"	97	
Dami Im	"Roar"	44	
Taylor Henderson	"Let Her Go"	85	
Joelle Hadjia	"Joey"	33	
Taylor Henderson	"Choirgirl"	51	
Dami Im	"Best of You"	78	
Dami Im	"Bridge over Troubled Water"	15	
Taylor Henderson	"The Horses"	27	
Jai Waetford	"That Should Be Me"	83	
Taylor Henderson	"Wake Me Up"	49	
Dami Im	"Clarity"	77	
Jiordan Tolli	"Royals"	81	
Third Degree	"Pump It"	84	
Jai Waetford	"Somewhere Only We Know"	95	
Taylor Henderson	"One Crowded Hour"	38	
Taylor Henderson	"Girls Just Want to Have Fun"	2	ARIA: Gold
Dami Im	"Wrecking Ball"	61	
Dami Im	"Saving All My Love for You"	85	
Jai Waetford	"Dynamite"	89	
Taylor Henderson	"Against All Odds"	90	
Third Degree	"Pound the Alarm"	96	
Dami Im	"And I Am Telling You I'm Not Going"	29	
Dami Im	"Hero"	62	
Taylor Henderson	"The Blower's Daughter"	43	
Taylor Henderson	"Some Nights"	45	
Jai Waetford	"Don't Let Me Go"	37	

=== Season six performances ===
Artist	Title	Peak chart positions	
Artist	Title	AUS	NZ
Brothers3	"Just the Way You Are"	98	—
Brothers3	"Always on My Mind"	73	—
Dean Ray	"Reckless"	50	—
Sydnee Carter	"Video Killed the Radio Star"	63	—
Reigan Derry	"Chandelier"	81	—
Brothers3	"Happy Birthday Helen"	86	—
Reigan Derry	"Stay with Me"	20	28
Brothers3	"Hey Brother"	58	—
Sydnee Carter	"Say Something"	73	—
Jason Heerah	"Higher Ground"	98	—
Dean Ray	"Budapest"	15	29
Reigan Derry	"Bang Bang"	53	—
Brothers3	"Pompeii"	91	—
Marlisa Punzalan	"Nothing Else Matters"	87	—
Dean Ray	"New Sensation"	90	—
Jason Heerah	"Latch"	38	—
Dean Ray	"Stolen Dance"	40	—
Reigan Derry	"Dog Days Are Over"	61	—
Brothers3	"I'm Gonna Be (500 Miles)"	75	—
Dean Ray	"Into My Arms"	36	—
Reigan Derry	"Burn for You"	78	—
Dean Ray	"Crying"	26	—
Brothers3	"Que Sera"	42	—
Brothers3	"The Sound of Silence"	48	—
Marlisa Punzalan	"Somewhere Over the Rainbow"	93	—
Marlisa Punzalan	"Titanium"	96	—
Dean Ray	"Folsom Prison Blues" / "That's All Right (Mama)"	49	—
Reigan Derry	"Only Love Can Hurt Like This"	63	—
Dean Ray	"The Power of Love"	65	—
Brothers3	"Massachusetts"	87	—
Dean Ray	"Bette Davis Eyes"	33	—
Marlisa Punzalan	"Yesterday"	67	—
Brothers3	"Safe & Sound"	82	—
"—" denotes a performance that did not chart in that country.

=== Season seven performances ===
Artist	Title	Peak chart positions
Artist	Title	AUS
Cyrus Villanueva	"Wicked Game"	6
Mahalia Simpson	"Hello"	88
Louise Adams	"People Help the People"	91
Jess & Matt	"Do You Remember"	53
Cyrus Villanueva	"Hold Back the River"	100
Jess & Matt	"Dancing in the Dark"	107
Cyrus Villanueva	"Rumour Has It"	109
Jess & Matt	"Stay"	68
Cyrus Villanueva	"Knockin' on Heaven's Door"	80
Louise Adams	"You Don't Own Me"	94
Jess & Matt	"You're the One That I Want"	30
Cyrus Villanueva	"In the Air Tonight"	71
Jess & Matt	"Need You Now"	77
Cyrus Villanueva	"Jealous"	81

== By Artist ==
Artist	Australia		Korea		New Zealand		Sweden
Artist	Top 100 song entries	Top 100 album entries	Top 100 song entries	Top 100 album entries	Top 40 song entries	Top 40 album entries	Top 60 album entries
Dami Im	17	3	4	2	—	—	—
Taylor Henderson	16	2	—	—	—	—	—
The Collective	12	1	—	—	—	—	—
Brothers3	11	1	—	—	—	—	—
Samantha Jade	11	2	2	—	—	—	—
Dean Ray	10	1	—	—	1	1	—
Jai Waetford	9	1	—	—	—	—	—
Cyrus Villanueva	8	1	—	—	—	—	—
Reigan Derry	8	—	—	—	1	—	—
Reece Mastin	7	3	—	—	4	3	—
Nathaniel Willemse	7	1	—	—	1	—	—
Bella Ferraro	7	—	—	—	—	—	—
Marlisa Punzalan	6	1	—	—	1	1	—
Jess & Matt	5	1	—	—	—	—	—
Louise Adams	3	1	—	—	—	—	—
Johnny Ruffo	3	—	—	—	—	—	—
Third Degree	3	—	—	—	—	—	—
Joelle Hadjia	3	—	—	—	—	—	—
Altiyan Childs	2	1	—	—	1	1	—
Random	2	1	—	—	—	—	—
What About Tonight	2	—	—	—	—	—	—
Jiordan Tolli	2	—	—	—	—	—	—
Christina Parie / KYA	2	—	—	—	—	—	—
Sydnee Carter	2	—	—	—	—	—	—
Jason Heerah	2	—	—	—	—	—	—
Jason Owen	1	2	—	—	—	—	—
Mahalia Simpson	1	—	—	—	—	—	—
JTR	—	1	—	—	—	—	1
Vince Harder	—	—	—	—	1	—	—
Young Men Society	—	—	—	—	1	—	—
Andrew Wishart	—	1	—	—	—	—	—
Caitlyn Shadbolt	—	1	—	—	—	—	—

== Certifications ==
=== Australia ===
The current Australian Recording Industry Association (ARIA) certification levels for albums and singles:

- Gold: 35,000 units
- Platinum: 70,000 units

Artist	Total certifications		
Artist	Platinum	Gold	Sales
Reece Mastin	10	1	735,000
Dami Im	4	3	385,000
Samantha Jade	4	3	385,000
Taylor Henderson	4	2	350,000
Nathaniel Willemse	4	—	280,000
Altiyan Childs	2	—	140,000
Johnny Ruffo	1	1	105,000
Marlisa Punzalan	1	1	105,000
The Collective	—	2	70,000
Jai Waetford	—	1	35,000
Dean Ray	—	1	35,000
Cyrus Villanueva	—	1	35,000

=== New Zealand ===
The current Recorded Music NZ (RMNZ) certification levels for albums and singles:

- Gold: 7,500 units
- Platinum: 15,000 units

Artist	Total certifications		
Artist	Platinum	Gold	Sales
Reece Mastin	3	1	37,500
Altiyan Childs	1	—	15,000

== Notes ==
- A L & J was released as a digital download for a limited time only.
- B "Recovery" was released as a digital download for a limited time only.
- C "Call Me Maybe" was released as a digital download for a limited time only.
