= Another Life (The Collective song) =

Single by the Collective
- Released: 28 June 2013
- Genre: Pop; R&B
- Length: 3:50
- Label: Sony
- Songwriters: Anthony Egizii; David Musumeci
- Producer: DNA

the Collective singles chronology
"Last Christmas" (2012)	"Another Life" (2013)	"Burn the Bright Lights" (2014)

"Another Life" is the third single by Australian boy band the Collective, released on 28 June 2013 by Sony Music Australia. It was written and produced by Anthony Egizii and David Musumeci of DNA; Musumeci and Egizii previously worked on the Collective's debut single "Surrender". Musically, "Another Life" is an upbeat pop and R&B power ballad about the breakup of a relationship. Upon its release, the song debuted and peaked at number 47 on the ARIA Singles Chart. The Collective promoted "Another Life" with performances on television programs and at shopping centres across Australia.

== Background and composition ==
After being formed and finishing third in the fourth series of The X Factor Australia, the Collective signed to Sony Music Australia and released their debut single "Surrender" in November 2012. It peaked at number six on the ARIA Singles Chart and was certified gold by the Australian Recording Industry Association. Their self-titled mini album The Collective and second single "Last Christmas" were both released the following month. In January 2013, the Collective and other contestants from the fourth series participated in the X Factor Live Tour. Five months after the tour concluded, the group revealed in June that their new single would be called "Another Life". The Collective wanted their next single to be upbeat so that their fans "would have another song to pump them up!." "Another Life" took one night to record. Band member Jayden Sierra was pleased with the recording process, calling it "a very enjoyable experience." He also added, "We really hope everyone loves the song as much as we loved making it!."

"Another Life" is an upbeat pop and R&B power ballad with a duration of three minutes and fifty seconds. It was written and produced by Anthony Egizii and David Musumeci of DNA, who also wrote and produced "Surrender". "Another Life" features "woah-oh-oh" vocals, harmonies and lyrics about the breakup of a relationship. In an interview with Dolly magazine, band member Will Singe explained that the song is "about a relationship that goes wrong. The girl is kind of leading you on but your always running back to her, 'til finally you realise it's not going to work. You praying that in another life it will work [because it won't] in this one."

== Release and reception ==
On 18 June 2013, the Collective asked their Twitter followers to trend "#TheCollectiveAnotherLifeUnlock" if they wanted to hear a sneak preview of the song. After it became a trending topic on Twitter later that day, the group unlocked a 31-second teaser of "Another Life" via TwitMusic. The song was made available for digital purchase on 28 June 2013, though it was originally scheduled to be released on 5 July 2013. "Another Life" was released as a CD single on 19 July 2013; it includes an instrumental version and a bonus fold-out poster. Mike Wass from Idolator described "Another Life" as a "slick pop record with an extremely catchy chorus and impressive vocals." The song debuted and peaked at number 47 on the ARIA Singles Chart dated 29 July 2013. The following week, it fell to number 71.

== Promotion ==
In June–July 2013, "Another Life" was used to promote the second season of Australian reality television series, Please Marry My Boy. The Collective performed the track during instore appearances at Westfield Belconnen in Belconnen, Australian Capital Territory (19 July 2013), Castle Towers in Castle Hill, New South Wales (20 July 2013) and Watergardens Town Centre in Taylors Lakes, Victoria (21 July 2013). They also performed the track on Sunrise and The Morning Show on 24 July 2013. The Collective resumed their instore appearances by performing "Another Life" at Westfield Chermside in Chermside, Queensland (25 July 2013), Westfield Carousel in Cannington, Western Australia (27 July 2013) and Westfield Tea Tree Plaza in Modbury, South Australia (1 August 2013). On 9 September 2013, the Collective performed the song on the fifth season of The X Factor Australia.

=== Music video ===
In a July 2013 interview with Australian Musician Network, Sierra revealed details about what to expect from the song's music video, saying "In the clip for 'Another Life' you can expect something not typical of a boy band clip. The theme plays on the title in a way that brings a unique idea." The video was uploaded to the Collective's Vevo account on 8 August 2013. The video predominantly features scenes of the Collective singing on the roof of a high building in the city, as well as scenes of each member singing individually to their girlfriends in their apartments.

== Track listing ==
- Digital download
1. "Another Life" – 3:50
- CD single
1. "Another Life" – 3:50
2. "Another Life" (Instrumental) – 3:50

== Personnel ==
- The Collective – vocals
- Anthony Egizii – keyboards, programming, mixing engineer, songwriting
- David Musumeci – songwriting
- Tom Coyne – mastering engineer

== Charts ==
Chart (2013)	Peak position
Australia (ARIA)	47

== Release history ==
Country	Date	Format	Label	Catalogue
Australia	28 June 2013	Digital download	Sony Music Australia	
Australia	19 July 2013	CD	Sony Music Australia	88883759562
