= The Good Life (The Collective song) =

Single by The Collective
- Released: 19 September 2014
- Length: 3:38
- Label: Sony
- Songwriters: Stuart Crichton; Brian Lee; Ross Golan; Erik Estrada
- Producers: Stuart Crichton; Brian Lee

The Collective singles chronology
"Problem" (2014)	"The Good Life" (2014)

"The Good Life" is the seventh single by Australian boy band The Collective, released on 19 September 2014 by Sony Music Australia. It was written by Stuart Crichton, Brian Lee, Ross Golan and Erik Estrada, and produced by Crichton and Lee. Upon its release, "The Good Life" debuted at number 74 on the ARIA Singles Chart. The Collective promoted the song with live performances at the Royal Melbourne Show and Slimefest, as well as interviews on television and radio programs.

== Background and release ==
Following the release of The Collective's fourth single "Burn the Bright Lights" in May 2014, the band released acoustic covers of Ne Yo's "Lazy Love" and Ariana Grande's "Problem" in July 2014 as their fifth and sixth singles. In September 2014, The Collective announced via social media that "The Good Life" would be released as their next single. "The Good Life" was written by Stuart Crichton, Brian Lee, Ross Golan and Erik Estrada, and produced by Crichton and Lee. Lyrically, the "feel good song is about changing the world and showing someone a good time with no worries of the real world."

"The Good Life" was released both digitally and physically on 19 September 2014. The physical edition features a 7th Heaven remix of "The Good Life" alongside the original version. The remix was later released digitally on 14 October 2014. Upon its release, "The Good Life" debuted at number 74 on the ARIA Singles Chart issue dated 29 September 2014 and became The Collective's twelfth entry on that chart.

== Promotion ==
The Collective performed "The Good Life", along with their previous singles "Surrender" and "Burn the Bright Lights", at the Royal Melbourne Show on 23–24 September 2014. They then performed the song at Nickelodeon Australia's third annual Slimefest concert in Sydney on 26 September 2014. The Collective also promoted "The Good Life" with interviews on The Morning Show (25 September 2014) and Joy 94.9 (27 September 2014). On 11 October 2014, they performed the song on the Today show, live from the Nine Network's Children's Hospital Telethon. The following day, the band performed "The Good Life" during an instore appearance at Westfield Garden City.

The music video premiered on The Collective's Vevo account on 29 September 2014. The video features the band individually filming their own lives using GoPro cameras. Each member is seen doing various activities such as waterskiing, bouncing on trampolines, performing on stage, bungee jumping, skydiving, going to the gym, playing ten pin bowling, riding go-karts and watching a football game. In between these scenes, The Collective are shown singing the song's lyrics at a party.

== Track listing ==
- Digital download
1. "The Good Life" – 3:38
- Digital download
1. "The Good Life" (7th Heaven Remix) – 3:55
2. "The Good Life" (7th Heaven Club Mix) – 7:39
- CD
1. "The Good Life" – 3:38
2. "The Good Life" (7th Heaven Remix) – 3:55

== Charts ==
Chart (2014)	Peak position
Australia (ARIA)	74

== Release history ==
Country	Date	Format	Version(s)	Label
Australia	19 September 2014	CD	Main version; 7th Heaven Remix	Sony Music Australia
Australia	19 September 2014	Digital download	Main version	Sony Music Australia
Australia	14 October 2014	Digital download	7th Heaven Remixes	Sony Music Australia
