= Rush (William Singe song) =

Single by William Singe
- Released: 3 February 2017
- Studio: Perfect Sound Studio, Los Angeles
- Length: 3:13
- Label: RCA Records
- Songwriters: William Singe; Julian Petroulas; Sebastian Lundberg; Kevin Clark; Benadette Cosgrove; Andrew Goldmark; Mark Mueller
- Producers: Singe; Petroulas; Lundberg; Axel Courtes

William Singe singles chronology
"Forgot You" (2013)	"Rush" (2017)	"Mama" (2017)

Music video
- "Rush" on YouTube

"Rush" is the debut single by Australian singer William Singe, released on 3 February 2017 by RCA Records. The song, built around a sample Jennifer Paige's "Crush", was co-written and co-produced by Singe.

== Background and release ==
In 2012, Singe auditioned for the fourth season of The X Factor Australia. Initially as a soloist, the judges placed him with Trent Bell, Julian De Vizio, Zach Russell and Jayden Sierra and together they formed The Collective. The Collective went on to finish in third place, but signed with Sony Music Australia two days after. Between 2012 and 2015, the group released seven singles and a studio album. On 18 February 2015, Singe announced on Facebook that he had left the group to pursue his solo career. Over the next 18 months, Singe uploaded numerous pop and R&B songs onto YouTube and on 29 July 2016, Singe announced that he officially signed with RCA Records.

In an interview with Billboard in February 2017, Singe explained that Julian Petroulas, his manager, played him "Crush" by Jennifer Paige and asked him "What do you think of this song?" to which Singe replied, "Yo. This chorus? We can do something heavy with this." He spent time with Petroulas and another guy named Sebastian and started writing the song but changed it from "Crush" to "Rush". Singe said "It's actually quite like a personal song to me because if you read the lyrics, it gets a bit deep. We had this 17-year-old producer from France come over to the studio and we made him sit down with the production, as well. It was done within a couple of days and we got it off to mixing and mastering then we started shooting the video."

== Music video ==
The music video was directed by Alexander Nikishin and released on 15 February 2017.

== Track listing ==
- Digital download
1. "Rush" – 3:13

== Charts ==
Chart (2017)	Peak position
Australian Hitseekers (ARIA)	14
