= Let Me Love You (Until You Learn to Love Yourself) =

2012 single by Ne-Yo

Single by Ne-Yo

from the album R.E.D.
- Released: July 10, 2012
- Genre: Dance-pop; Europop; synthpop
- Length: 4:14
- Label: Motown
- Songwriters: Shaffer Smith; Sia Furler; Mark Hadfield; Tor E. Hermansen; Mike Di Scala; Mikkel S. Eriksen
- Producers: Stargate; Reeva & Black

Ne-Yo singles chronology
"Lazy Love" (2012)	"Let Me Love You (Until You Learn to Love Yourself)" (2012)	"Turn Around" (2012)

Audio sample
- "Let Me Love You (Until You Learn to Love Yourself)": file; help

"Let Me Love You (Until You Learn to Love Yourself)" is a song performed by American singer and songwriter Ne-Yo, taken from his fifth studio album, R.E.D. (2012). Released on July 10, 2012, by Motown Records, the song serves as the mainstream lead single from the album following the release of an R&B-tinged lead single, "Lazy Love".

"Let Me Love You" combines elements of synthpop and Europop with a celebratory chorus co-written with singer-songwriter Sia and production courtesy of Ne-Yo's frequent Norwegian collaborators Stargate and British producers Mark Hadfield and Mike Di Scala (also known as Reeva & Black). A music video directed by Christopher Simms sees Ne-Yo "channeling" Michael Jackson in his dance moves, as well as showing off a toned physique. The song peaked at number six on the Billboard Hot 100. Outside of the United States, "Let Me Love You (Until You Learn to Love Yourself)" topped the charts in the United Kingdom, and peaked within the top ten of the charts in Australia, Belgium (Flanders), Japan, and the Republic of Ireland.

== Background and release ==
Ne-Yo's 2012-released fifth album R.E.D. (as in "Realizing Every Dream") is the follow-up to the singer's 2010 concept-heavy studio album, Libra Scale. The album's first single titled "Lazy Love" premiered online on May 14, 2012, and was serviced to US urban radio later the same month. On June 12, 2012, the song was released for digital download in the United States, and a music video for the steamy R&B single premiered a day prior on June 11, 2012, on BET's 106 & Park.

On July 9, 2012, "Let Me Love You" premiered online to various media outlets. A day later, it was released for digital download in Australia, mainland Europe, and the United Kingdom. "Let Me Love You" was served to US rhythmic / crossover radio stations on July 31, 2012, and a week later to pop / mainstream stations. It was released for US digital downloads on July 31, 2012. Internationally, "Let Me Love You" is the sole lead single for the album. On November 6, 2012, a remix was released with a different type of beat and an additional rap verse from French Montana.

== Writing and production ==
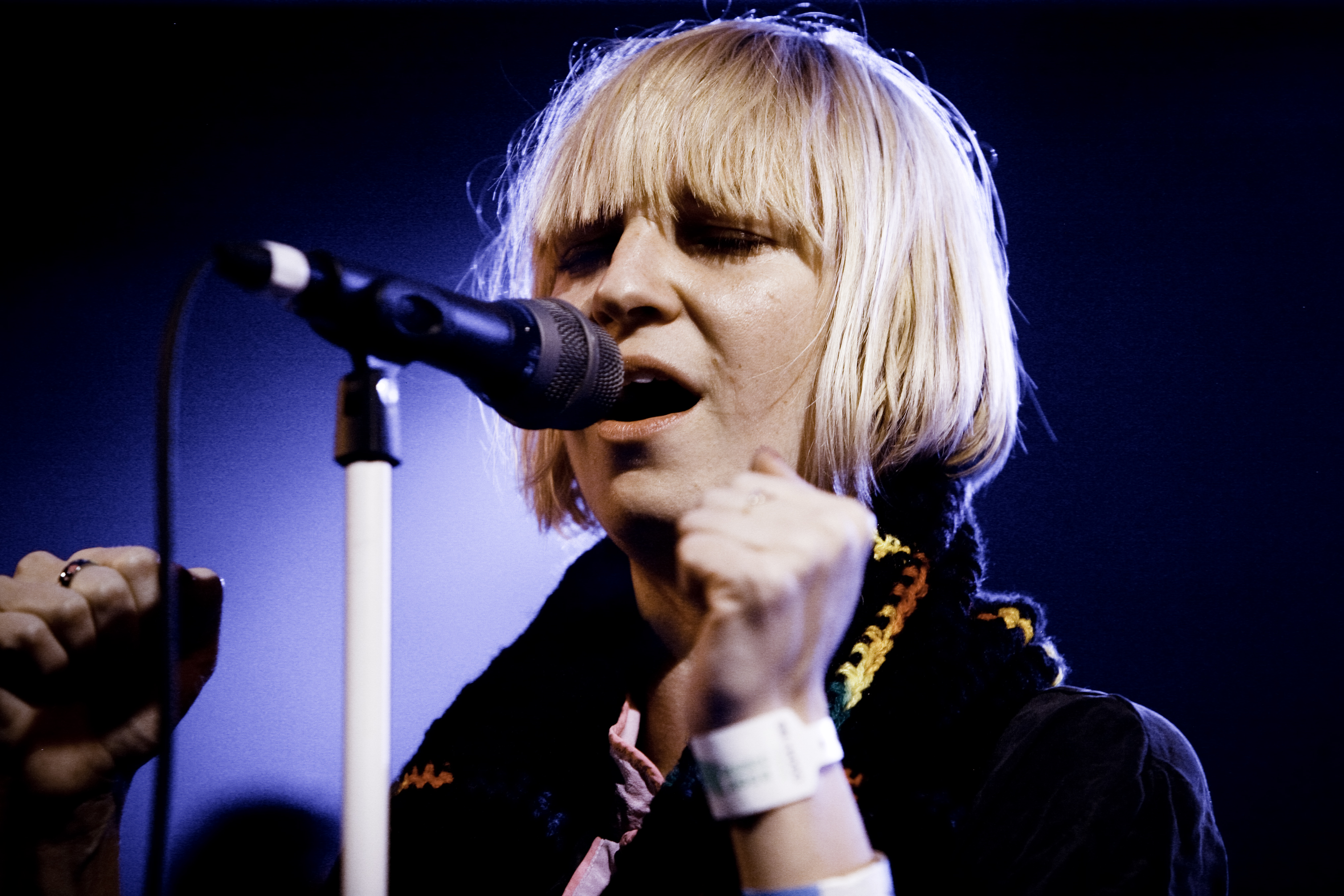
Australian singer Sia co-wrote the song along with Ne-Yo

At 4:14 in length, "Let Me Love You (Until You Learn to Love Yourself)" is an up-tempo club song written in the key of F Major with a chord progression in Bb major-D minor-C major which combines elements of Europop and synthpop. The original instrumental track was written and produced British producers Mike Di Scala and Mark Hadfield, who began a production partnership in November 2011. In February 2012, the duo sent the then untitled "Let Me Love You (Until You Learn to Love Yourself)" along with eleven other songs to the management team of Norwegian production duo Mikkel S. Eriksen and Tor Hermansen, better known under their production moniker of Stargate. The Norwegian duo subsequently worked on the song writing additional music elements, while Australian indie pop singer and songwriter Sia wrote and recorded the "top line vocals".

Sia built the song's chorus around the line "Let me love you, and I will love you/ Until you learn to love yourself", which would also become the song's title. The record was then heard by Ne-Yo who decided to record the song, and proceeded to re-write some of the lyrics in the verses. Speaking about the song Ne-Yo said he was inspired by the powerful chorus, and in a press release he elaborated on the song's lyrical content:

"It goes beyond the realm of just a relationship between man and woman, this is understanding what it is to allow another person to get close enough to you to teach you how to love yourself. This song, if taken care of the right way, could help the world!"

The melody consists of "euphoric synthesizers" and "pounding beats".

This is one of two collaborations between Sia and Stargate. They would later team up again to co-write Rihanna's song "Diamonds", alongside producer Benny Blanco.

== Critical reception ==
The song received generally favorable reviews from music critics. Andrew Hampp of Billboard perceived that the song "re-established Ne-Yo's top 40 appeal," calling it "the crème de la crème of emotive dancefloor ballads." He also praised the song's uplifting self-worth message, writing that the lyrics "make this one of 2012's standout dance-pop cuts in a year filled with far more innocuous entries." Andy Kellman of Allmusic picked the song as one of the best from the album, but ultimately called it "serviceable but indistinct." Nate Chinen of New York Times named it a "convincing Euro dance track." Ken Capobianco of Boston Globe called it "essential," writing that "it's a deftly conceived confection."

Mikael Wood remarked that "it seems designed to remind us of simpler times by recycling a portion of its title from the 2004 Mario hit that was one of Ne-Yo's first big songwriting successes." Lewis Corner of Digital Spy gave the song 3 out of 5 stars, writing that "it's nothing we haven't heard from Ne-Yo before, but the result is a corny but charming electro serenade that's a welcome return to form for Mr Smith." Mark Edward Nero of About.com considered its sound "not warm", writing that he "was hoping that he was starting to move away from this heavily synthesized Euro-dance pop."

== Chart performance ==
The song peaked at number six on the Billboard Hot 100 chart, becoming his first top 10 single as a lead artist in the US in four years, since the 2008 single "Miss Independent". On Billboard's Rhythmic Airplay chart, the single gave Ne-Yo his fifth number one on that chart and his second as a solo artist since "So Sick" reached that position in February 2006.

In the United Kingdom, "Let Me Love You (Until You Learn to Love Yourself)" entered at the top of the UK Singles Chart on September 9, 2012 – for the week ending date September 15, 2012 – becoming Ne-Yo's fifth number one song in Britain after "So Sick" in March 2006, "Closer" in June 2008, "Beautiful Monster" in August 2010, and "Give Me Everything" in May 2011. The song sold 89,000 copies there in its first week of release, and sold 347,000 copies as of December 2012, making it Britain's 49th best-selling song of 2012.

== Music video ==
The music video for "Let Me Love You (Until You Learn to Love Yourself)" was directed by Christopher Simms. Incorporating choreographed dance scenes, with Ne-Yo baring "his toned physique" in a bedroom scene, the video was uploaded on the singer's Vevo channel on July 18, 2012. The overall atmosphere in the video is "dark", consisting of dim lighting and murky locations. The video begins with an opening scene where Ne-Yo wears his trademark fedora to one side, while singing the opening lyrics of the song. The video then moves on to bedroom scenes, where Ne-Yo strips of to show his six pack abs while embracing a topless woman. Trent Fitzgerald from music website PopCrush stated that in the following dance scenes, Ne-Yo was "channeling" Michael Jackson in his dance moves. These scenes feature Ne-Yo dancing in front of a troop of backing dancers in a warehouse setting. Finally, the video ends with Ne-Yo and his femme fatale on a beach, smiling at the camera.

== Live performances ==
Ne-Yo performed the song on the first live results show of season nine of The X Factor in the United Kingdom on October 7, 2012. He also performed it on The Ellen DeGeneres Show on November 13, 2012. Ne-Yo performed the song on Saturday Night Live on December 8, 2012, and on the top 6 live results of The Voice with contestant Amanda Brown. He also performed it at 1st Indonesian Choice Awards along with Give Me Everything.

== Charts ==
=== Weekly charts ===
Chart (2012–2013)	Peak position
Australia (ARIA)	8
Belgium (Ultratop 50 Flanders)	10
Belgium (Ultratop 50 Wallonia)	30
Canada Hot 100 (Billboard)	11
Czech Republic Airplay (ČNS IFPI)	38
France (SNEP)	22
Germany (GfK)	61
Hungary (Rádiós Top 40)	26
Ireland (IRMA)	5
Italy (FIMI)	45
Japan Hot 100 (Billboard)	5
Mexico Anglo (Monitor Latino)	15
Netherlands (Dutch Top 40)	26
Netherlands (Single Top 100)	20
New Zealand (Recorded Music NZ)	20
Scottish Singles Sales (Official Charts)	3
Slovakia Airplay (ČNS IFPI)	19
Switzerland (Schweizer Hitparade)	55
UK Singles (Official Charts)	1
UK Hip Hop/R&B (Official Charts)	1
US Billboard Hot 100	6
US Hot Dance/Electronic Songs (Billboard)	3
US Adult Pop Airplay (Billboard)	20
US Dance Club Songs (Billboard)	4
US Pop Airplay (Billboard)	4
US Rhythmic Airplay (Billboard)	1

=== Year-end charts ===
Chart (2012)	Position
Australia (ARIA)	72
France (SNEP)	150
Japan (Japan Hot 100)	60
Netherlands (Dutch Top 40)	85
UK Singles (Official Charts Company)	51
US Billboard Hot 100	74
US Rhythmic (Billboard)	35

Chart (2013)	Position
Canada (Canadian Hot 100)	74
US Billboard Hot 100	86
US Hot Dance/Electronic Songs (Billboard)	31
US Mainstream Top 40 (Billboard)	50
US Rhythmic (Billboard)	33

== Certifications ==
Region	Certification	Certified units/sales
Australia (ARIA)	2× Platinum	140,000^{^}
Brazil (Pro-Música Brasil)	Platinum	60,000^{‡}
New Zealand (RMNZ)	Platinum	15,000^{*}
United Kingdom (BPI)	Platinum	600,000^{‡}
United States (RIAA)	Platinum	1,000,000^{*}
Streaming
Denmark (IFPI Danmark)	Gold	900,000^{†}
^{*} Sales figures based on certification alone.^{^} Shipments figures based on certification alone.^{‡} Sales+streaming figures based on certification alone.^{†} Streaming-only figures based on certification alone.

== Radio and release history ==
List of release dates showing countries, formats and record labels
Region	Date	Format	Record label
Australia	July 10, 2012	Digital download	Universal
Germany	July 11, 2012	Digital download	Universal
United Kingdom	September 2, 2012	Digital download	Mercury
United States; Canada	July 31, 2012	Digital download	Motown
United States; Canada	July 31, 2012	Rhythmic / Crossover	Motown
United States; Canada	August 7, 2012	Pop / Mainstream	Motown
