= Set Me on Fire =

Single by Bella Ferraro
- Released: 14 December 2012
- Recorded: 2012
- Genre: Pop
- Length: 3:25
- Label: Sony
- Songwriter(s): Louis Schoorl; Hayley Warner

Bella Ferraro singles chronology
"Set Me on Fire" (2012)	"Forgot You" (2013)

"Set Me on Fire" is the debut single by Bella Ferraro who finished fourth on the fourth season of The X Factor Australia. It was released digitally by Sony Music Australia on 14 December 2012.

== Background and release ==
"Set Me on Fire" was written by Louis Schoorl and Hayley Warner. It would have been Ferraro's winner's single for the fourth season of The X Factor, if she had won the show. However, she finished in fourth place. "Set Me on Fire" was released digitally as her debut single on 14 December 2012. A CD single was also released.

== Track listing ==
- CD / digital download
1. "Set Me on Fire" – 3:40

== Charts ==
=== Weekly charts ===
Chart (2012)	Peak position
Australia (ARIA)	36

== Release history ==
Region	Date	Format	Label	Catalogue
Australia	14 December 2012	CD single	Sony Music Australia	88765438302
Australia	14 December 2012	Digital download	Sony Music Australia	—
