= Bella Ferraro =

Australian singer (born 1994)

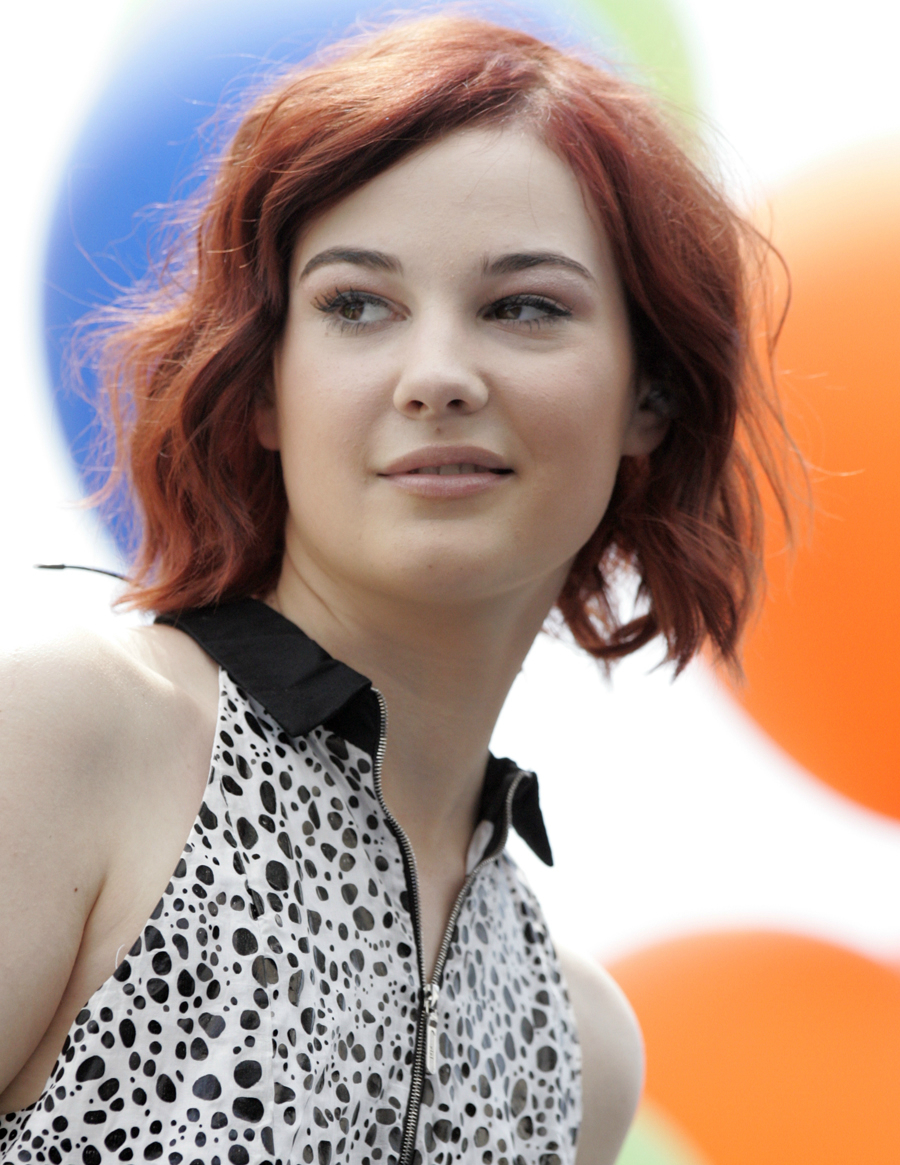
- Ferraro in 2012

Background information
- Born: Isabella Devenish-Meares; 1994 (age 31–32); Sydney, Australia
- Origin: Sydney, Australia
- Genres: Indie pop, soul, soft rock
- Occupation: Singer
- Instrument: Vocals
- Years active: 2012–present
- Label: Sony

Isabella Ferraro (born Isabella Devenish-Meares; 20 August 1994) is an Australian singer who competed in the fourth season of The X Factor Australia in 2012.

== Early life ==
Ferraro was born and raised in Sydney, Australia. She began singing as a child. At age five, she became a member of the Australian Girls Choir, which performed at the annual Carols in the Domain and during Oprah Winfrey's Australian tour. Ferraro left school in Year 12 to pursue a music career.

== Career ==
=== 2012: The X Factor Australia ===
Ferraro successfully auditioned for the fourth season of The X Factor in 2012, singing "Skinny Love", with a treatment based on the version by Birdy. She was inspired to audition for the show after seeing the success of One Direction on the UK version. During the super boot camp stage, Ferraro forgot the lyrics to the two songs she performed: Gotye's "Somebody That I Used to Know" and Crowded House's "Don't Dream It's Over". For the first live performance show on 17 September 2012, Ferraro sang Matt Corby's "Brother" and received a mixed response from the judges. Mel B said it was not the right song choice, while Ronan Keating disagreed, saying that he loved the song choice and describing her performance as "beautiful".

For the second live performance show, Ferraro performed a stripped back version of "What Makes You Beautiful". She received mixed reviews from the judges, who concluded that while the song was an appropriate choice, the arrangement did not match that week's theme, "Party Week". Her performance of "What Makes You Beautiful" debuted at number 62 on the ARIA Singles Chart. For the third live performance show, she sang "Big Yellow Taxi" by Joni Mitchell and received a positive response from the judges for her vocals, but mixed reviews over the choreography. Ferraro's performance of "Big Yellow Taxi" debuted at number 84. For the fourth live show, she sang "Ray of Light" by Madonna, followed by the English version of "99 Red Balloons" by German band Nena for the fifth live show. In week six of the live shows, Ferraro fell into the bottom two alongside Fourtunate but was saved after Mel B, Natalie Bassingthwaighte, and Guy Sebastian all opted to eliminate Fourtunate.

For the seventh live performance show, Ferraro sang The Temper Trap's "Sweet Disposition". Her performance debuted in the charts at number 59. For the eighth live performance show, Ferraro sang "Dreams" by The Cranberries, and her performance debuted at number 82. In the semi-finals of the live shows, Ferraro fell into the bottom two alongside The Collective; the result was a deadlock and so reverted to the earlier public vote. Ferraro was the tenth contestant eliminated in the competition. Her performance of "The Last Day on Earth" debuted at number 90.

==== Performances on The X Factor ====
denotes having reached the ARIA Singles Chart.
denotes having been in the bottom two.

Show	Theme	Song	Original artist	Order	Result
Auditions	Free choice	"Skinny Love"	Birdy	N/A	Through to super bootcamp
Super bootcamp 1	Free choice	"The A Team"	Ed Sheeran	N/A	Through to stage 2
Super bootcamp 2	Free choice	"Somebody That I Used to Know"	Gotye	N/A	Through to stage 3
Super bootcamp 3	Free choice	"Don't Dream It's Over"	Crowded House	N/A	Through to home visits
Home visits	Free choice	"Heartbeats"	Ellie Goulding	N/A	Through to live shows
Week 1	Judges' Choice	"Brother"	Matt Corby	10	Safe
Week 2	Party All Night	"What Makes You Beautiful"	One Direction	5	Safe
Week 3	Top 10 Hits	"Big Yellow Taxi"	Joni Mitchell	5	Safe
Week 4	Legends	"Ray of Light"	Madonna	7	Safe
Week 5	1980s	"99 Red Balloons"	Nena	5	Safe
Week 6	Latest and Greatest	"Shake It Out"	Florence + the Machine	6	Bottom two
Week 6	Final showdown	"Tonight"	Lykke Li	2	Saved
Week 7	Made in Australia	"Sweet Disposition"	The Temper Trap	5	Safe
Week 8	Judges' Challenge	"Dreams"	The Cranberries	5	Safe
Semi-final	Power and Passion	"Bulletproof"	La Roux	3	Bottom two
Semi-final	Power and Passion	"The Last Day on Earth"	Kate Miller-Heidke	7	Bottom two
Semi-final	Final Showdown	"Angel"	Sarah McLachlan	1	Eliminated

=== 2012–2013: Record deal and singles ===
After The X Factor ended, Ferraro obtained a recording contract with Sony Music Australia and released her debut single "Set Me on Fire" on 14 December 2012. The song peaked at number 36 on the ARIA Singles Chart on 30 December 2012. Her second single "Forgot You", which features Will Singe of The Collective, was released on 18 October 2013 and peaked at number 75 on the ARIA Singles Chart.

=== 2014: Leaving Sony Music and social media ===
Ferraro opted out of her recording contract and abandoned all social media in 2014. She is no longer signed to Sony Music Australia.

=== 2015-2019: Life away from the spotlight, LilBels ===
Over the following years, Ferraro studied music production, did backing vocals and keyboards, and performed on occasion under the name LilBels. As LilBels, she performed in Sydney with band Sister Peach, where she was rediscovered by the artist Zepha, a turning point for Ferraro's return to music.

=== 2020-Present: Returning as Bella Ferraro, new single ===
Ferraro performed at the Sydney venue Low 302, where she played unreleased tracks that she had finalized with Zepha. After the positive response, she released a single, "Her", in August 2020. Dave Ruby Howe from Triple j Unearthed said about the single: "Bella's vocal and this whole pulsing track does more than just luring you in. It's more like they trap you. Everything feels close up and connected; skin to skin, baring the soul." She released another single, "Believe You", on 30 October 2020. On March 1st 2024, she released "Heartbreaks".

== Artistry ==
Ferraro cites Bon Iver, Lykke Li, Crystal Castles, Foals and Two Door Cinema Club as her musical influences.

== Discography ==
=== Singles ===
Title	Year	Peak chart positions	Album
Title	Year	AUS	Album
"Set Me on Fire"	2012	36	Non-album single
"Forgot You" (featuring Will Singe)	2013	75	Non-album single
"Her"	2020		Non-album single
"Believe You"	2020		Non-album single
"Heartbreaks"	2024		Non-album single

Music Videos
Title	Year	Album
Set Me On Fire	2012	—N/a
Forgot You (feat. Will Singe)	2013	—N/a

=== Other charted songs ===
Title	Year	Peak chart positions
Title	Year	AUS
"What Makes You Beautiful"	2012	62
"Big Yellow Taxi"	2012	84
"Sweet Disposition"	2012	59
"Dreams"	2012	82
"The Last Day on Earth"	2012	90
