= Burn the Bright Lights =

Single by The Collective
- B-side: "Lazy Love"
- Released: 30 May 2014
- Genre: Pop
- Length: 3:31
- Label: Sony
- Songwriters: Christian Nilsson; Justin Gray; Zac Poor
- Producers: Adrian Breakspear; Gary Pinto; Justin Gray; Zac Poor

The Collective singles chronology
"Another Life" (2013)	"Burn the Bright Lights" (2014)	"Lazy Love" (2014)

"Burn the Bright Lights" is the fourth single by Australian boy band The Collective, released on 30 May 2014 by Sony Music Australia. It was written by Justin Gray, Zac Poor and Christian Nilsson, and produced by the latter two with Adrian Breakspear and Gary Pinto. The song served as The Collective's first release since the departure of member Zach Russell. Upon its release, "Burn the Bright Lights" debuted at number 34 on the ARIA Singles Chart. The Collective promoted the track with performances on radio and television programs and at shopping centres. The accompanying music video features the band performing in a warehouse.

== Background ==
"Burn the Bright Lights" was written by Christian Nilsson, Justin Gray and Zac Poor, and produced by the latter two with Adrian Breakspear and Gary Pinto. It was mixed by Miles Walker and mastered by Leon Zervos. Amit Ofir provided the guitar for the song. "Burn the Bright Lights" is The Collective's first release without member Zach Russell, who left the band to become a firefighter. According to the Australian Musician Network, "'Burn the Bright Lights' is a song that manifests their passion, drive and desire to succeed." When The Collective heard a demo of the song, they immediately wanted to record it. Julian De Vizio stated that the song has "a power and emotion inside" it "that everyone can relate to no matter what they're going through", while Trent Bell described "Burn the Bright Lights" as "a mature song" that "has got feeling and hits people's hearts."

== Release and reception ==
On 8 May 2014, The Collective announced via social media that "Burn the Bright Lights" would be released as their new single. Following the announcement, the song's title became the number-two trending topic on Twitter. "Burn the Bright Lights" was made available to pre-order on 9 May 2014. It was then released both digitally and physically on 30 May 2014. The physical edition features The Collective's cover of "Lazy Love" by Ne-Yo as a B-side track. Keely Kovacevic of Optus Zoo described "Burn the Bright Lights" as a "slow-burning pop track" that showcases "their impressive vocal talents." My Canberra Digital wrote that the song "has an impressive strong punch to it which lets us hear just how much the group's vocals have grown and developed." For the week commencing 9 June 2014, "Burn the Bright Lights" debuted at number 34 on the ARIA Singles Chart and became the highest new entry that week as well as The Collective's eleventh entry on that chart. In its second week, the song dropped thirty-five places to number 69.

== Promotion ==
=== Music video ===
The music video for "Burn the Bright Lights" was filmed at Carriageworks. It was later uploaded to The Collective's Vevo account on 30 May 2014. The video opens with the band driving a black car in front of an old building. As they drive inside the building, The Collective exit the car and go to perform the song in front of several bright lights. Throughout the video, intercut scenes of each member singing the song separately are shown; De Vizio sings in front of the car, Bell sings at the building's entrance, Jayden Sierra sings in front of a window and Will Singe sings in front of a wired fence.

=== Live performances ===
The Collective performed an acoustic version of "Burn the Bright Lights" on The Bump Show on 30 May 2014. The following day, they performed "Burn the Bright Lights" during an instore appearance at Westfield Plenty Valley in Mill Park, Victoria. The Collective also performed the song on Today (4 June 2014), The Riff (6 June 2014) and during their instore appearances at Westfield Liverpool in Liverpool, New South Wales (7 June 2014) and Westfield Parramatta in Parramatta, New South Wales (28 June 2014). They performed an acoustic version of "Burn the Bright Lights" in the Take 40 Australia Live Lounge on 26 June 2014.

== Track listing ==
- Digital download
1. "Burn the Bright Lights" – 3:31
- CD
1. "Burn the Bright Lights" – 3:31
2. "Lazy Love" – 4:01

== Personnel ==
- The Collective – vocals
- Adrian Breakspear – producer
- Justin Gray – songwriter, producer
- Christian Nilsson – songwriter
- Amit Ofir – guitar
- Gary Pinto – producer
- Zac Poor – songwriter, producer
- Miles Walker – mixing engineer
- Leon Zervos – mastering engineer

== Charts ==
Chart (2014)	Peak position
Australia (ARIA)	34

== Release history ==
Country	Date	Format	Label
Australia	30 May 2014	CD; digital download	Sony Music Australia
