= Heart Miles =

Heart Miles EP

EP by Jai Waetford
- Released: 3 June 2016
- Genre: Pop
- Label: Sony

Jai Waetford chronology
Shy (EP) (2015)	Heart Miles EP (2016)

Singles from Heart Miles
- 1. "Living Not Dreaming" Released: 5 February 2016

Heart Miles is the fourth EP by Australian singer Jai Waetford. It was released in Australia as a digital download on 3 June 2016 with the CD version being released on 10 June 2016. It peaked at number 24 on the ARIA Albums Chart. It has been supported by a European tour during May and June 2016. Jai has stated that the material was mostly inspired by his long-distance relationship with Carrington Durham who lives in America.

== Review ==
David from AuspOp gave the EP 4 out of 5 saying; "The ‘Heart Miles’ EP feels like a proper introduction to Jai and what he has to say. From this point onwards, I’ll be keenly listening to whatever comes next." David said his favourite track was "Heart Miles" which samples Haddaway’s "What Is Love", "this earworm is one guaranteed to get stuck in your head. It’s another track added to my regular playlist. Jai’s voice is confident, clear and powerful in the message he’s delivering."

== Track listing ==
No.	Title	Length
1.	"Waves"	2:52
2.	"Worlds"	3:28
3.	"The Nights We Won't Remember"	3:25
4.	"Heart Miles"	3:31
5.	"Elements"	3:43
6.	"Living Not Dreaming"	3:30
7.	"The Worst Goodbye"	3:51
8.	"Shy (2016 mix)" (2016 mix)	3:07

== Chart performance ==
=== Weekly charts ===
Chart (2016)	Peak position
Australian Albums (ARIA)	24

== Release history ==
Region	Date	Format	Label	Catalogue
Australia	3 June 2016	Digital download, Compact Disc	Sony Music Entertainment Australia	88985340532
