= Lazy Love =

Single by Ne-Yo

from the album R.E.D.
- Released: June 12, 2012
- Genre: R&B
- Length: 3:17
- Label: Motown
- Songwriters: Shaffer Smith, Robert Shea Taylor
- Producer: Shea Taylor

Ne-Yo singles chronology
"Let's Go" (2012)	"Lazy Love" (2012)	"Let Me Love You (Until You Learn to Love Yourself)" (2012)

"Lazy Love" is a song by American recording artist Ne-Yo, premiere online on May 14, 2012. It officially impacted Urban radio on May 29, 2012, and was released on June 12, 2012, by Motown Records for purchase as a digital download. It is the first single from his album R.E.D. The music video for the song premiered on June 11, 2012. The song peaked at #25 on the Billboard Hot R&B/Hip Hop Songs chart. The music video was directed by Diane Martel.

== Background and release ==
Ne-Yo's fifth album R.E.D. (2012) is the follow-up to the singer's 2010 concept-heavy studio album, Libra Scale. The album's first single titled "Lazy Love" was premiered online on May 14, 2012, and was serviced to US urban radio on May 29, 2012. On June 12, 2012, the song was released for digital download in the United States. The song entered the Billboard Hot R&B/Hip Hop Songs chart at #97, and peaked at 25. "Lazy Love" is one of two songs which precede the album's release, the other "Let Me Love You (Until You Learn to Love Yourself)" being directed towards mainstream audiences, with its Europop and synthpop production.

== Music video ==
The clean version of the music video was premiered on BET's 106 & Park on June 11, 2012. While the explicit/dirty version of the video premiered the following day on VEVO.

== Writing and production ==
"Lazy Love" is a down-tempo R&B slow-jam written by Ne-Yo and Robert Shea Talor, with production courtesy of Shea Taylor. The song features a "sonorous base" line and "slow-drip synths" with lyrics that centre on the "languid desire that pins a couple to their sheets way past morning".

== Live performances and cover versions ==
Ne-Yo has performed the song live. He performed it live for the first time on BET's 106 & Park. On May 30, 2014, Australian boy band The Collective released an acoustic cover of "Lazy Love" as a B-side to the physical release of their fourth single "Burn the Bright Lights". The Collective's cover was later released digitally on July 4, 2014, as their fifth single.

== Charts ==
=== Weekly charts ===
Chart (2012)	Peak position
US Bubbling Under Hot 100 Singles	14
US Hot R&B/Hip-Hop Songs (Billboard)	25

=== Year-end charts ===
Chart (2012)	Position
US Hot R&B/Hip-Hop Songs (Billboard)	97
