= William Singe =

Maori YouTuber and musician (born 1992)

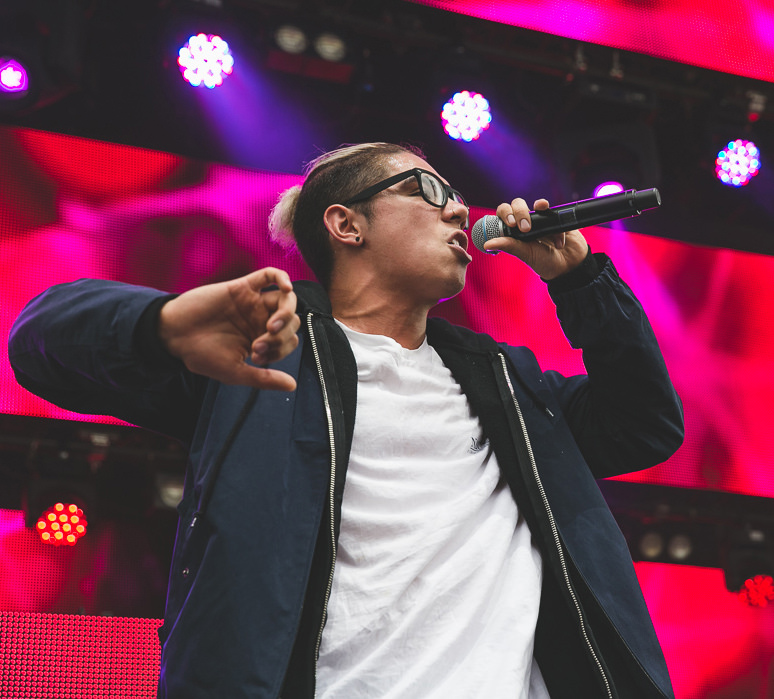
- Singe in 2015

Background information
- Born: Liam Anthony Singe; 2 July 1992 (age 34); Gisborne, New Zealand
- Genres: Pop; R&B; hip hop
- Occupations: Singer; songwriter; record producer
- Years active: 2011–present
- Label: ACTS Music Group

Liam Anthony "William" Singe (born 2 July 1992) is a New Zealand YouTuber, singer, songwriter, and record producer.

Singe started his career as a member of The Collective, an Australian boy band which was formed during the fourth season of The X Factor Australia in 2012, finishing in third place. The Collective subsequently signed with Sony Music Australia and released seven singles and a self-titled album. They disbanded after Singe left the group in 2015.

In 2014 and 2015, Singe recorded R&B, pop, reggae, hip-hop and rap covers in his bedroom. He accumulated over two million Facebook fans, reached a number one position on Spotify, 20 million Spotify streams, and had more than 500 million video views and 2.6 million subscribers on YouTube.

== Early life ==
William Singe was born in Gisborne, New Zealand, and raised in Forestville, aka 'Forry', a suburb of northern Sydney. He is paternally of Māori descent. He began recording music as a child, drawing inspiration from his father, a singer and songwriter from the Ngāti Porou Māori tribe. Singe was a student at St Augustine's College in Brookvale and worked as a bank teller at the Commonwealth Bank in Dee Why.

== Career ==
In 2011, Singe auditioned for The X Factor in season three and made it to the end of the bootcamp stage.

In 2012, he auditioned for the fourth season singing Justin Bieber's "One Less Lonely Girl" (with added rap lyrics that Singe wrote himself) and received positive comments from the judges. He progressed to the super bootcamp stage.

=== 2012–2014: The Collective ===
After Singe did not to make it into the top six of the Under-25 Boys category during super bootcamp, the judges decided to put him together with Trent Bell, Julian De Vizio, Zach Russell and Jayden Sierra to form a boy band named The Collective. On 20 November 2012, it was announced that The Collective finished in third place.

On 22 November 2012, The Collective signed a recording contract with Sony Music Australia. The group's self-titled mini album, The Collective, was released on 14 December 2012. The album debuted at number 11 on the ARIA Albums Chart and was certified gold.

In 2013, Singe was featured on fellow X Factor contestant Bella Ferraro's single "Forgot You" which peaked at number 75 on the ARIA Singles Chart.

On 18 February 2015, Singe announced that he had left the group to pursue his solo career. The remaining members of The Collective disbanded that same month to also pursue solo careers.

=== 2015–present: Solo career ===
As a solo performer, Singe recorded cover tracks of contemporary musicians, such as from Justin Bieber, Adele, Drake, Fetty Wap, and The Weeknd. He sang in his bedroom and uploaded the videos to Facebook and YouTube. Starting 2015 with 6 cover videos and around 20 thousand followers on his Facebook page, Singe grew to more than two million followers by the end of the year with 44 additional cover videos.

Singe announced on 14 October that he signed to Paradigm, a US entertainment agency representing Ed Sheeran, Coldplay, Sia and Black Eyed Peas, among others.

In September and October, One Direction's Liam Payne and the singer T-Pain reached out via Twitter to connect with Singe, expressing interest to collaborate with him.

Singe covered Drake's song "Hotline Bling" on 24 September. It became his most popular video to date. In less than a month, the video earned close to 25 million views on YouTube and Facebook, reaching a number one position on Spotify's US Viral 50 chart.

Singe co-wrote "What You Want" for and with Samantha Jade, included on her album Nine, which was released in 2015.

Noting Singe's success, Capital Xtra concluded: "YouTube sensation William Singe is a star in his own right, having racked up millions of views across his phenomenal covers of Fetty Wap's '679,' The Weeknd's 'Earned It' and now Drake's 'Hotline Bling.' The 22-year-old Aussie singer-songwriter completely makes the song his own and it sounds incredible." The Fern Events, a South Sydney-based event solutions company, also commented that Singe was "just phenomenal, his perseverance is really paying off."

On 29 July, Singe announced that he had officially signed with RCA Records. His debut solo single was released on 3 February 2017, titled "Rush".

On 5 May 2017, he appeared on the Jonas Blue single "Mama", which became a top 10 hit in many countries, including Australia, UK, New Zealand, Germany, Norway, Denmark and South Africa.

On 13 June 2017, he reached 2 million subscribers on YouTube.

In January 2018, "Mama" was nominated for two Brit Awards. The ceremony would take place the following month.

In May 2023, Singe signed with independent record label & management group, ACTS Music Group. His debut album, Where Do Birds Go At Night?, was released on 28 July 2023. The album's tracklist includes "Whānau", which has versions in both Māori and English, and is his first song translated into te reo Māori.

== Concert tours ==
In January 2016, Singe embarked on The Introduction Tour across Australia, Asia, the United States and Europe. In February, March and April 2017, he toured the United States with Alex Aiono on the "Changes Tour".

In October 2023, Singe headlined the first 1MX Festival held in Sydney.

== Discography ==
=== Extended plays ===
List of EPs, with selected details
Title	Details
Where Do Birds Go at Night?	Released: 28 July 2023; Format: Digital; Label: Twenty87, ACTS Music Group

=== Charted singles ===
==== As lead artist ====
List of charted singles
Title	Year	Peak chart positions	Album
Title	Year	AUS Heat.	Album
"Rush"	2017	14	Non-album single

==== As featured artist ====
List of singles as featured artist
Title	Year	Peak chart positions										Certifications	Album
Title	Year	UK	AUS	AUT	DEN	GER	NLD	NOR	NZ	SWE	US	Certifications	Album
"Forgot You" (Bella Ferraro featuring Will Singe)	2013	—	—	—	—	—	—	—	—	—	—		Non-album single
"Mama" (Jonas Blue featuring William Singe)	2017	4	7	5	5	5	5	9	8	6	— (Note: "Mama" did not enter the Billboard Hot 100, but peaked at number 1 on the Bubbling Under Hot 100 Singles chart, which acts as an extension to the Hot 100.)	BPI: 2× Platinum; ARIA: 5× Platinum; BVMI: 2× Platinum; GLF: 2× Platinum; IFPI AUT: Gold; IFPI DEN: 2× Platinum; NVPI: 2× Platinum; RIAA: Gold; RMNZ: 3× Platinum	Blue
"Breathe" (EDY featuring Will Singe)	2023	—	—	—	—	—	—	—	—	—	—		EDYOnTheBeat
"—" denotes items which failed to chart in that country.
