= Surrender (The Collective song) =

2012 single

Single by The Collective

from the album The Collective
- Released: 23 November 2012
- Recorded: 2012
- Genre: Pop
- Length: 3:45
- Label: Sony
- Songwriters: David Musumeci; Anthony Egizii; William Singe
- Producer: DNA Songs

The Collective singles chronology
"Surrender" (2012)	"Last Christmas" (2012)

"Surrender" is the debut single by Australian boy band The Collective, released on 23 November 2012. It also served as the lead single from their self-titled mini album. The song was written by David Musumeci and Anthony Egizii and the rap verse by band member William Singe. It was produced by Musumeci and Egizii under their production name DNA Songs. "Surrender" peaked at number six on the ARIA Singles Chart and was certified gold by the Australian Recording Industry Association (ARIA), denoting sales of 35,000 copies. It also peaked at number 97 on the South Korea Gaon International Chart.

== Background and release ==
"Surrender" was written by David Musumeci, Anthony Egizii and the rap verse by band member William Singe. It was produced by Musumeci and Egizii under their production name DNA Songs. The song would have been The Collective's winner's single for the fourth season of The X Factor Australia, if they had won the show. However, it was announced on 20 November 2012 that The Collective finished in third place. Two days later, it was announced that the group signed a recording contract with Sony Music Australia and would release "Surrender" as their debut single. The song was made available for digital purchase on 23 November 2012, and was released as a CD single on 28 November 2012.

== Chart performance ==
"Surrender" debuted and peaked at number six on the ARIA Singles Chart dated 3 December 2012. The following week, the song descended to number 43. "Surrender" was certified gold by the Australian Recording Industry Association (ARIA), denoting sales of 35,000 copies. For the week ending 6 January 2013, "Surrender" debuted and peaked at number 97 on the South Korea Gaon International Chart.

== Promotion ==
=== Music video ===
The music video for "Surrender" premiered online on 22 December 2012. It features scenes of The Collective at a house party. Throughout the video, scenes of each member singing in front of different coloured backdrops are intercut. The video ends with a pool party.

=== Live performances ===
The Collective performed "Surrender" live for the first time during The X Factor Australia grand final performance show on 19 November 2012. A writer for Take 40 Australia wrote that the song "included everything that is great about The Collective – with every boy having their moment in the spotlight including William with his now distinctive rap style!". On 13 December 2012, The Collective performed "Surrender" at the Crown Street Mall in Wollongong, New South Wales and signed CD copies of the single for fans. The following day, they performed "Surrender" on Australian breakfast television program Sunrise.

== Track listing ==
- CD / digital download
1. "Surrender" – 3:45

== Charts ==
=== Weekly charts ===
Chart (2012–13)	Peak position
Australia (ARIA)	6
South Korea (Gaon International)	97

=== Year-end charts ===
Chart (2012)	Position
Australian Artist Singles (ARIA)	40

== Certifications ==
Region	Certification	Certified units/sales
Australia (ARIA)	Gold	35,000^{^}
^{^} Shipments figures based on certification alone.

== Release history ==
Country	Date	Format	Label
Australia	23 November 2012	Digital download	Sony Music Australia
Australia	28 November 2012	CD single	Sony Music Australia
