= The Collective (band) =

Australian boy band

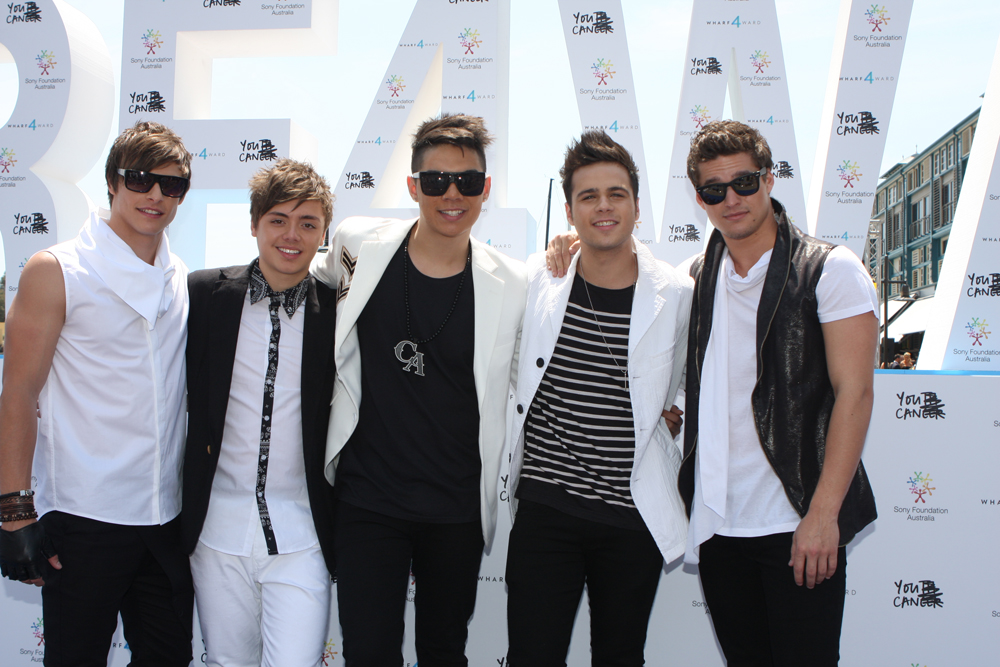
- The Collective in October 2012. From left to right: Trent Bell, Jayden Sierra, Will Singe, Julian De Vizio and Zach Russell.

Background information
- Origin: Sydney, New South Wales, Australia
- Genre: Pop
- Years active: 2012–2015
- Label: Sony Music Australia
- Past members: Trent Bell; Julian De Vizio; Jayden Sierra; Will Singe; Zach Russell
- Website: thecollectiveofficial.com

The Collective were an Australian boy band consisting of members Trent Bell, Julian De Vizio, Zach Russell, Jayden Sierra and Will Singe. They were formed during the fourth season of The X Factor Australia in 2012 and were the last contestant eliminated. The Collective subsequently signed with Sony Music Australia and released their debut single "Surrender", which debuted at number six on the ARIA Singles Chart. The group's self-titled album, The Collective, was released in December 2012 and debuted at number 11 on the ARIA Albums Chart. The Collective disbanded in 2015 to pursue solo careers.

== History ==
=== 2012: The X Factor Australia and formation ===
In 2012, Trent Bell, Julian De Vizio, Zach Russell, Jayden Sierra and Will Singe successfully auditioned as soloists for the fourth season of The X Factor and progressed to the super bootcamp stage. After failing to make it into the top six of the Boys category during super bootcamp, the judges Ronan Keating, Guy Sebastian, Natalie Bassingthwaighte and Mel B decided to put them together to form a boy band for the home visits stage, thus qualifying for the Groups category. During home visits, they travelled to London, England and sang Rihanna's "We Found Love", their first song as a group, in front of their mentor Keating and guest mentors One Direction. Keating later selected them, along with Fortunate and What About Tonight, for the live finals—a series of ten weekly live shows in which contestants are progressively eliminated by public vote. During the official launch for The X Factor at the Museum for Contemporary Art in Sydney on 13 September 2012, Keating announced that the group would be called The Collective. He stated, "We put it up on the web and had a lot of different names and the fans themselves picked it."

For the Judges' Choice-themed first live show, The Collective performed Jessie J's "Domino" and received positive comments from the judges, with Keating calling it "the best performance I've ever seen on X Factor anywhere in the world". Bassingthwaighte described their performance as "phenomenal", while Sebastian said it was "unbelievable". For the Party All Night-themed second live show, they performed Kenny Loggins' "Footloose" and again received praise from the judges, with Mel B saying that Keating had a good chance of winning The X Factor with The Collective. For the third and fourth live shows, The Collective performed New Kids on the Block's "You Got It (The Right Stuff)" and The Beatles' "A Hard Day's Night" respectively. For the '80s-themed fifth live show, they performed Madonna's "Like a Prayer" and received a mixed response from the judges. Bassingthwaighte thought it was not the right song choice for them, while Mel B said "sexy is back". For the Latest and Greatest-themed sixth live show, The Collective performed Ed Sheeran's "Lego House" and again received a mixed response from the judges. While Bassingthwaighte said they "looked fantastic, sounded great", Sebastian felt that Singe, who was on main vocals, looked and sounded nervous and that it was not a perfect performance. For the Made in Australia-themed seventh live show, The Collective performed Timomatic's "Incredible". Following their performance of Justin Bieber's "Beauty and a Beat" in the quarter-final, The Collective landed in the bottom two for the first time with Shiane Hawke. Keating, Mel B, and Sebastian voted to send The Collective through to the semi-final in the final showdown, resulting in Hawke being eliminated. However, voting statistics revealed that Hawke received more votes than The Collective, which meant that if Sebastian sent the result to deadlock, Hawke would have advanced to the semi-final and The Collective would have been eliminated.

In the semi-final, The Collective performed two songs, OneRepublic's "Apologize" and Chris Brown's "Yeah 3x", and received standing ovations from the judges for both of the performances. That same week, The Collective landed in the bottom two again with Bella Ferraro. They received two votes each from the judges, and the result went to deadlock. The Collective received the most public votes and advanced to the final, resulting in Ferraro being eliminated. They joined Samantha Jade and Jason Owen for the grand final. During the first part of the final on 19 November, the three finalists were required to perform three songs – their audition song, last shot song and winner's single. The Collective's last shot song was Karmin's "Brokenhearted" and their winner's single was titled "Surrender". The following day, it was announced that The Collective were the last contestant eliminated.

=== 2012–15: The Collective and subsequent releases ===
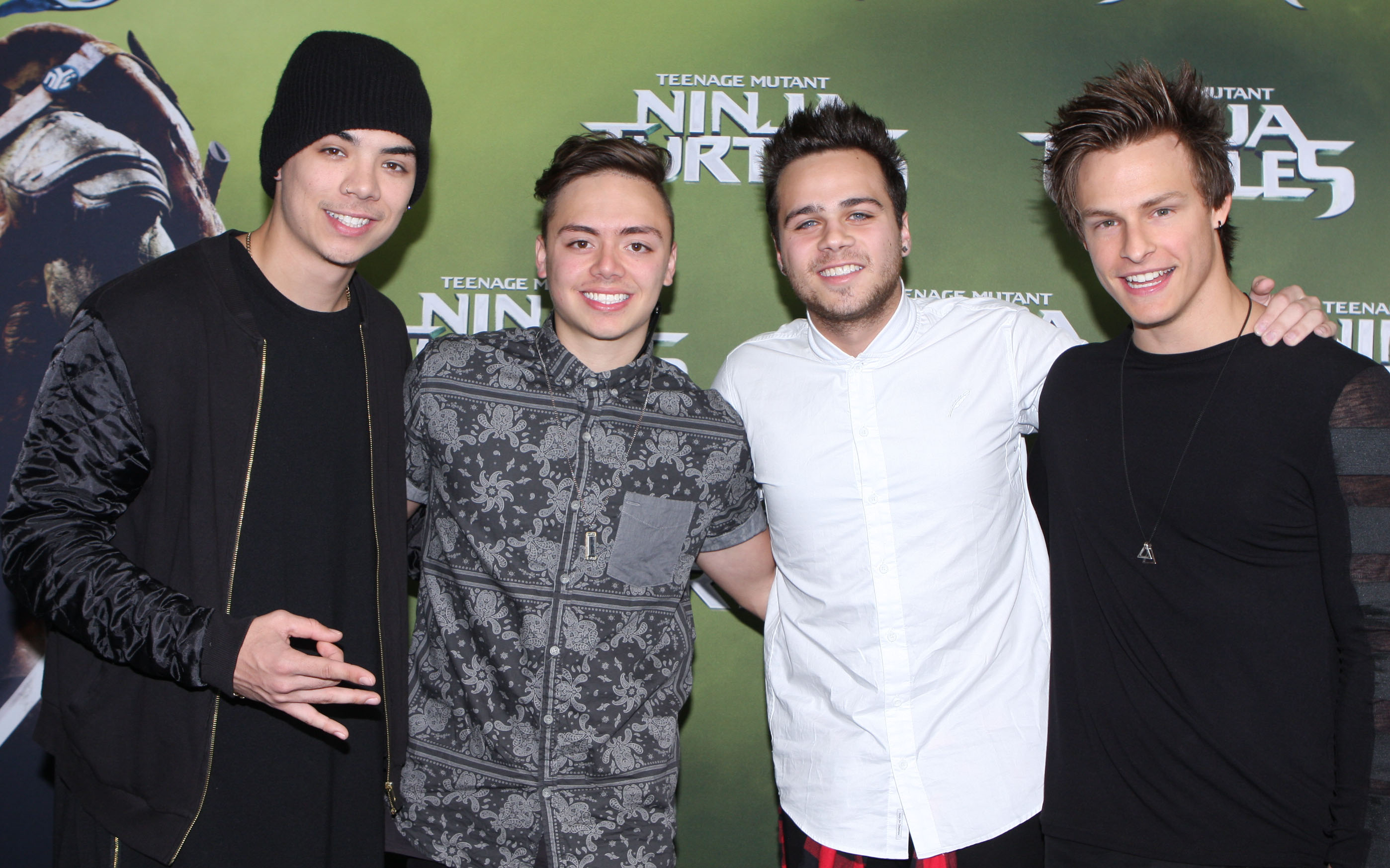
The Collective in September 2014

On 22 November 2012, two days after The X Factor ended, The Collective signed a recording contract with Sony Music Australia. Their song "Surrender" was released digitally the following day as their debut single. It debuted at number six on the ARIA Singles Chart and was certified gold by the Australian Recording Industry Association for sales of 35,000 copies. The group's self-titled mini album, The Collective, was released on 14 December 2012; it features their debut single, studio recordings of six songs they performed on The X Factor, and a cover of Wham!'s "Last Christmas". The album debuted at number 11 on the ARIA Albums Chart and was certified gold. "Last Christmas" was released as the group's second single that same day, but failed to impact the charts. At the 2012 Poprepublic.tv IT List Awards, The Collective won the 'Favourite Australian Group' award and were nominated for 'Breakthrough Artist of 2012'.

In January 2013, The Collective and other contestants from the fourth season of The X Factor embarked on The X Factor Live Tour across Australia. Their third single "Another Life" was released on 28 June 2013, and debuted at number 47 on the ARIA Singles Chart. On 24 August 2013, The Collective performed in Indonesia for RCTI's 24th anniversary television special, X Factor Around the World, along with Samantha Jade, Melanie Amaro, Novita Dewi, Jahméne Douglas and Fatin Shidqia. They performed "Surrender" and then "Payphone" as a duet with Shidqia. The Collective was the supporting act for Jessica Mauboy's To the End of the Earth Tour in Melbourne on 9 November 2013. On 26 January 2014, band member Zach Russell announced on Twitter that he had left the group. The remaining members of The Collective served as the supporting act for Reece Mastin's Restless Tour in Canberra on 7 February 2014. The group's fourth single "Burn the Bright Lights" was released on 30 May 2014, and debuted at number 34 on the ARIA Singles Chart. On 4 July 2014, The Collective released acoustic covers of Ne-Yo's "Lazy Love" and Ariana Grande's "Problem" as their fifth and sixth singles, but both failed to impact the charts. "The Good Life" was released as The Collective's seventh single on 19 September 2014, and debuted at number 74 on the ARIA Singles Chart. On 18 February 2015, band member Will Singe announced on Facebook that he had left the group to pursue his solo career. The remaining members of The Collective disbanded that same month to also pursue solo careers.

== Members ==
=== Trent Bell ===
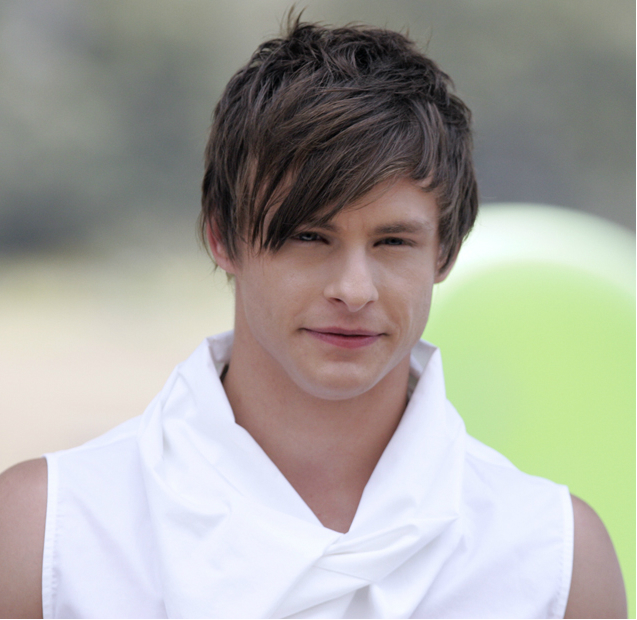
Trent Bell

Trent Bell, born 16 May 1990 (age 36), is from Townsville, Queensland. He was a student at Kirwan State High School in Kirwan, Queensland and was the school captain in Year 12. Bell left Townsville in 2009 to pursue his dream for music; he auditioned for the seventh season of Australian Idol but did not make the top twelve. Bell also worked as a retail assistant in Brisbane. In 2011, he did vocal training and speech therapy. Bell previously auditioned for The X Factor in seasons two and three but did not progress to the live finals. Bell auditioned for the fourth season of The X Factor singing Train's "Drops of Jupiter (Tell Me)" and received positive comments from the judges and a standing ovation from the audience. Guy Sebastian welcomed him back and told him that it could be his year, while Natalie Bassingthwaighte loved how he never gave up. Bell stated that "persevering and persistence", as well as previous X Factor contestants Reece Mastin and Johnny Ruffo, inspired him to audition for the third time. Since The Collective disbanded Trent has been working extremely hard in the recording studio writing, producing and recording his debut single LIMITLESS as a solo artist which was released on iTunes 14 April 2016. Trent was the first from the group to release an original song on iTunes since The Collective disbanded. Trent is embarking on his Limitless Promo Tour of the Eastern States of Australia to promote the debut single from 14 April until 29 May 2016. Along the way Trent has had numerous interviews promoting the debut single 'Limitless' and the song has been played on radio stations all over Australia. And on 5 May 2016 Limitless music video was featured in Richard Wilkins Entertainment segment on The Today Show. Trent was a contestant on season 7 of the Australian version of the reality TV show, The Voice airing on Channel 9, where he made it up to the semi-finals.

=== Jayden Sierra ===
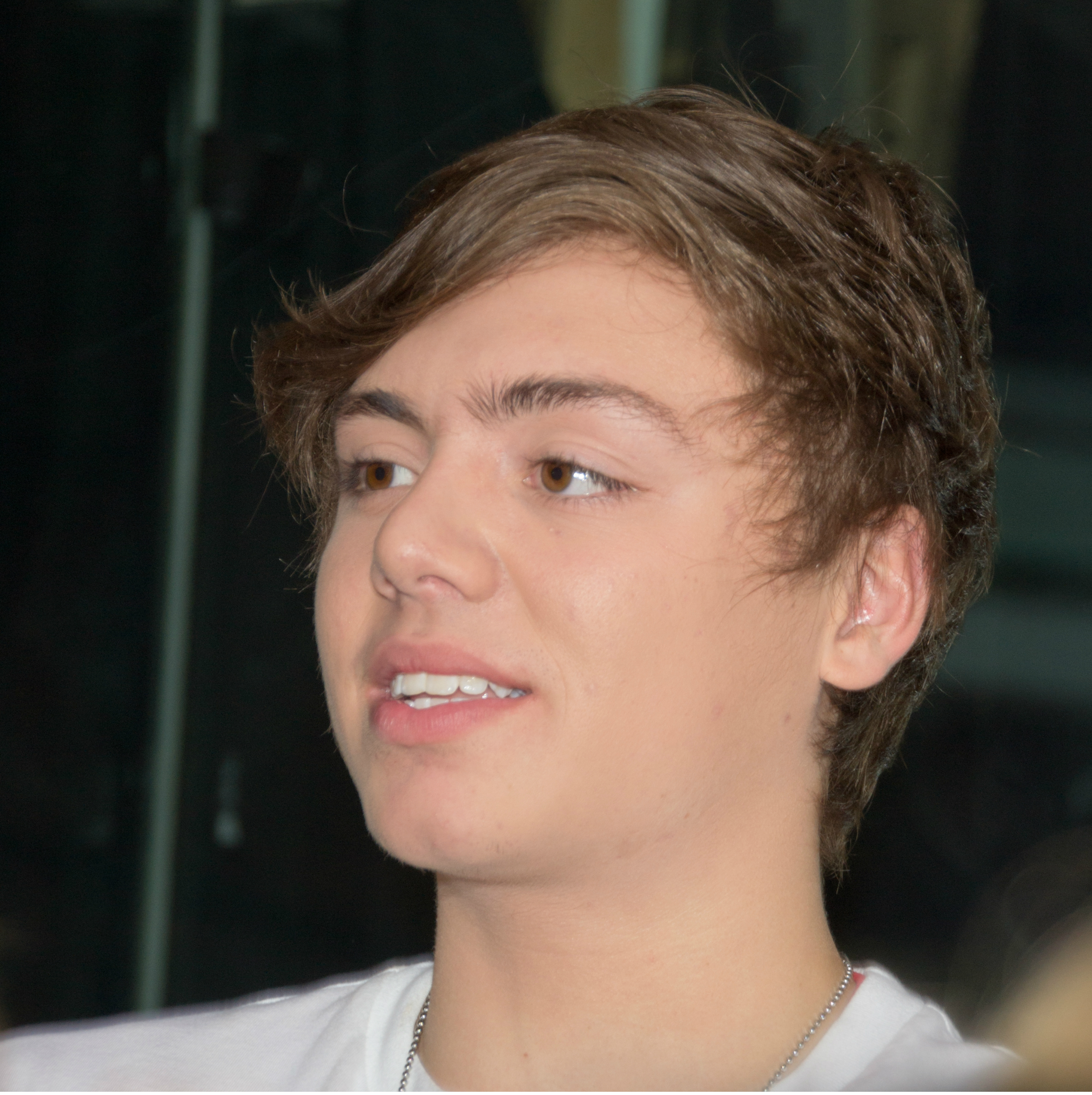
Jayden Sierra

Jayden Sierra, born 3 October 1994 (age 32), is from Camden, New South Wales. Sierra auditioned for The X Factor singing Paramore's "The Only Exception" and garnered praise from the judges, with Mel B saying that he would be the perfect candidate for a "hot ass boy band". Sierra was inspired by previous X Factor contestants Reece Mastin and Christina Parie to audition for the show. Sierra's parents inspired him to pursue music and they signed him up for his first singing lesson at the age of 12.

Prior to entering The X Factor, he had been singing for six years after giving up soccer to pursue his passion for music. Sierra had also taken part in two seasons of Opera Australia. He was a student at Macarthur Anglican School in Cobbitty, New South Wales. The school's music program helped Sierra grow as a singer which led to him singing in front of the entire school on many occasions. He also had a lead role in the school's production of The Boy Friend.

=== Julian De Vizio ===
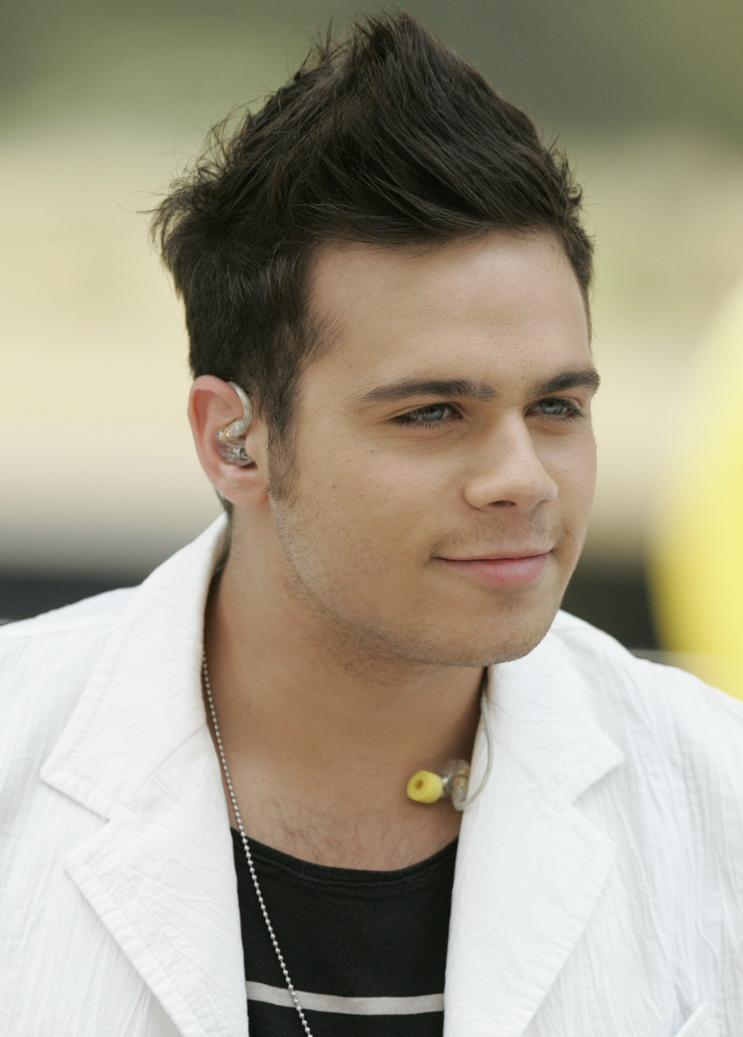
Julian De Vizio

Julian De Vizio, born 1 August 1995 (age 31), is from Adelaide, South Australia and is the youngest member of The Collective. De Vizio began singing at the age of six. He auditioned for The X Factor singing Chris Brown's "With You" and received a positive response from the judges, with Ronan Keating calling him special. De Vizio stated that seeing a lot of young artists including Justin Bieber "who are huge around the world" inspired him to audition for the show. Prior to entering The X Factor, he was a student at Rostrevor College in Woodforde, South Australia. He was also in the school choir and a cappella groups.

=== William Singe ===
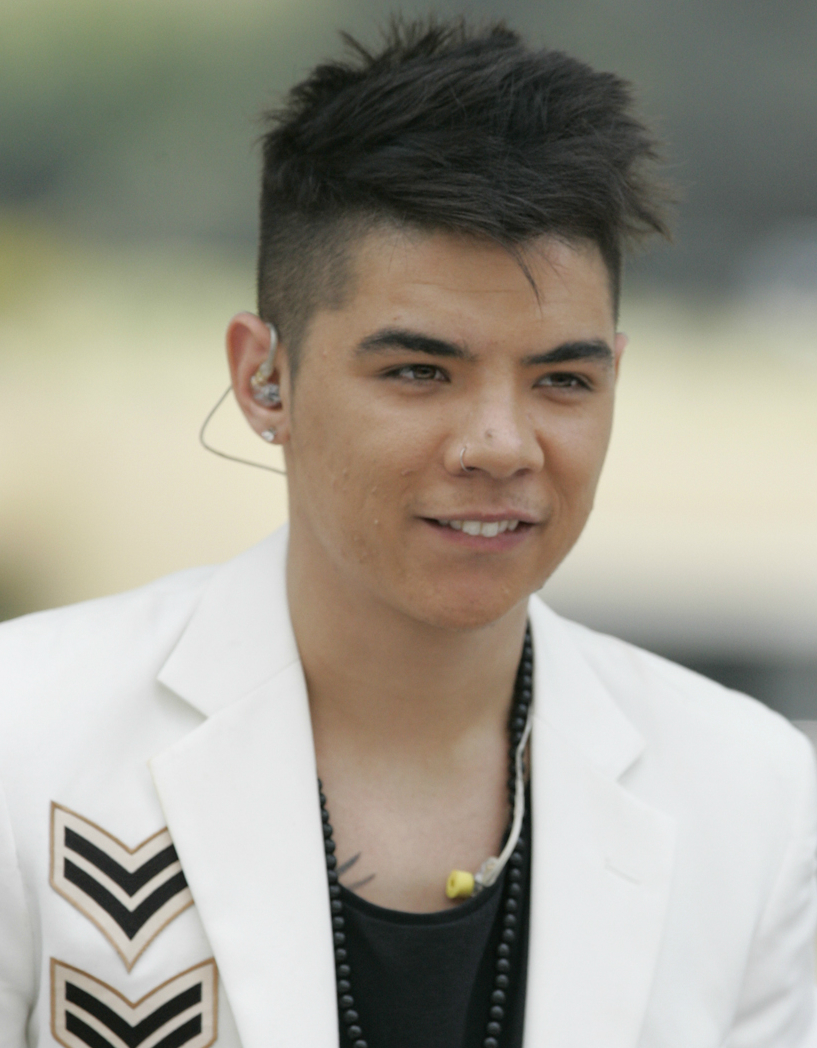
Will Singe

William Singe, born 2 July 1992 (age 34), is from Forestville, New South Wales and was the rapper of The Collective. Singe is of Māori Australian descent. He previously auditioned for The X Factor in season three but only made it to the end of the bootcamp stage. Singe auditioned for the fourth season singing Justin Bieber's "One Less Lonely Girl" and received positive comments from the judges. Mel B felt that Singe was singing the song just to her, Guy Sebastian called his added rap in the song "crazy", and Ronan Keating said it was a great audition song.

Prior to entering The X Factor, Singe worked as a bank teller at the Commonwealth Bank in Dee Why, New South Wales. He was a student at St Augustine's College in Brookvale, New South Wales. Singe cites his father, a singer-songwriter from New Zealand who plays guitar and bass, for his musical beginnings. He began recording music with his father as a child and previously held gigs with him at In Situ, a restaurant and bar in Manly, New South Wales. In 2013, Singe was featured on fellow X Factor contestant Bella Ferraro's single "Forgot You" which peaked at number 75 on the ARIA Singles Chart. On 18 February 2015, Singe announced on Facebook that he had left The Collective to pursue his solo career. In April 2015, he was featured on the single "Don't Need 'Em" by Donell Lewis and Fortafy.

=== Zach Russell ===
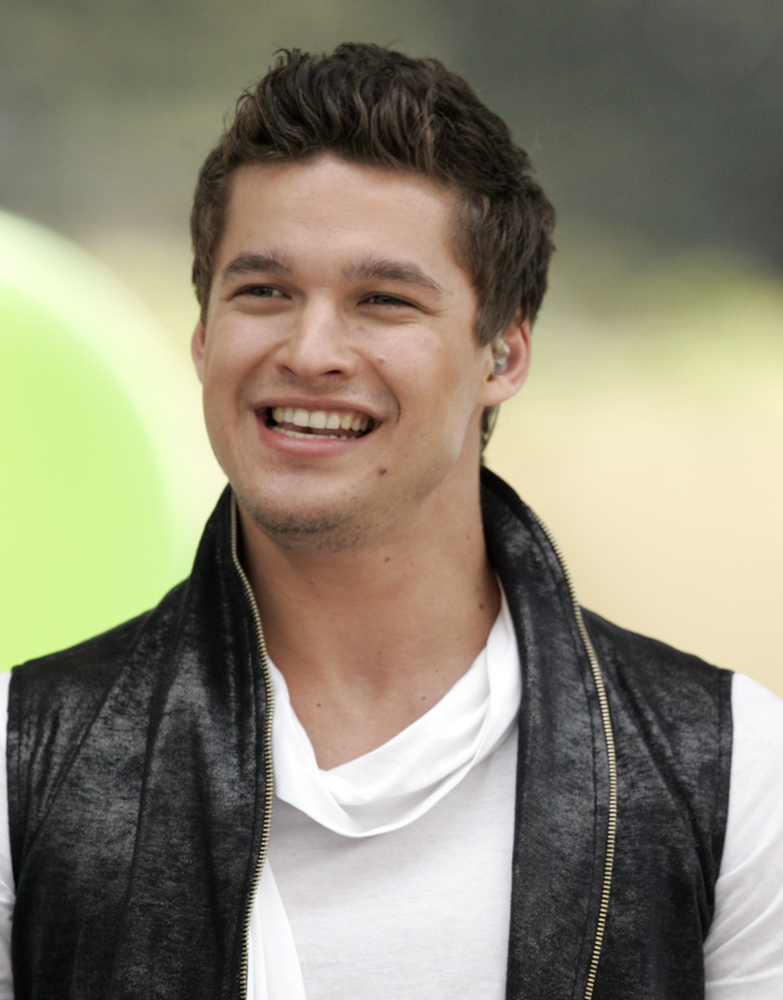
Zach Russell

Zachariah Russell, born 21 December 1989 (age 36), is from Rockhampton, Queensland. Russell auditioned for The X Factor singing Stevie Wonder's "Superstition" and received a mixed response from the judges. Mel B thought his rendition was annoying, Natalie Bassingthwaighte said he "butchered the song" but has star quality, and Ronan Keating said it was the wrong song choice. However, he received four yes votes from the judges and progressed to the next round. Prior to entering The X Factor, Russell worked for his father's courier company.

On 26 January 2014, Russell announced on Twitter that he had left The Collective. In an interview with The Morning Bulletin on 1 February 2014, he admitted that he left the group in order to pursue a career as a firefighter. Russell has since moved back to Rockhampton and is now working at a car dealership.

== Concert tours ==
Headlining

- The X Factor Live Tour (2013)

Supporting

- Jessica Mauboy's To the End of the Earth Tour (2013)
- Reece Mastin's Restless Tour (2014)

== Discography ==
=== Albums ===
Title	Album details	Peak chart positions	Certifications
Title	Album details	AUS	Certifications
The Collective	Released: 14 December 2012; Label: Sony Music Australia; Format: CD, digital download	11	ARIA: Gold

=== Singles ===
Title	Year	Peak chart positions		Certifications	Album
Title	Year	AUS	KOR	Certifications	Album
"Surrender"	2012	6	97	ARIA: Gold	The Collective
"Last Christmas"	2012	—	—		The Collective
"Another Life"	2013	47	—		Non-album single
"Burn the Bright Lights"	2014	34	—		Non-album single
"Lazy Love"	2014	—	—		Non-album single
"Problem"	2014	—	—		Non-album single
"The Good Life"	2014	74	—		Non-album single
"—" denotes items which failed to chart in that country.

=== Other charted songs ===
Title	Year	Peak chart positions
Title	Year	AUS
"Domino"	2012	35
"Footloose"	2012	41
"You Got It (The Right Stuff)"	2012	78
"Like a Prayer"	2012	65
"Lego House"	2012	70
"Beauty and a Beat"	2012	94
"Apologize"	2012	47
"Yeah 3x"	2012	72
"—" denotes items which failed to chart.

=== Music videos ===
Title	Year	Director(s)
"Last Christmas"	2012	
"Surrender"	2012	
"Another Life"	2013	
"Burn the Bright Lights"	2014	
"Lazy Love"	2014	
"The Good Life"	2014	

== Awards and nominations ==
Year	Type	Award	Result
2012	Poprepublic.tv IT List Awards	Favourite Australian Group	Won
2012	Poprepublic.tv IT List Awards	Breakthrough Artist of 2012	Nominated
2013	Poprepublic.tv IT List Awards	Favourite Australian Group	Won
2014	Channel [V] Awards	[V] Oz Artist of the Year	Nominated
