= The Collective (The Collective album) =

Studio album / Mini album by The Collective
- Released: 14 December 2012
- Recorded: 2012: Melbourne
- Genre: Pop
- Label: Sony
- Producer: DNA Songs

Singles from The Collective
- 1. "Surrender" Released: 23 November 2012; 2. "Last Christmas" Released: 14 December 2012

The Collective is the self-titled debut mini album by Australian boy band The Collective, released on 14 December 2012 by Sony Music Australia. After finishing third in the fourth season of The X Factor in 2012, The Collective began recording the album in Melbourne. The album contains their debut single "Surrender", recorded versions of six songs they performed on The X Factor, and a cover of Wham!'s "Last Christmas". The Collective was preceded by the lead single "Surrender", which peaked at number six on the ARIA Singles Chart. Upon release, the album debuted at number 11 on the ARIA Albums Chart and was certified gold by the Australian Recording Industry Association (ARIA), denoting shipments of 35,000 copies.

== Development and release ==
After finishing third in the fourth season of The X Factor in 2012, The Collective signed a recording contract with Sony Music Australia. On 29 November 2012, it was announced on Australian breakfast television program Sunrise that The Collective would be releasing a self-titled mini album. Recording for the album took place in Melbourne on 30 November and ended on 3 December. The Collective was released on 14 December, as both CD and digital download formats. It features recorded versions of six songs they performed on The X Factor, including "Domino", "Footloose", a medley of "You Got It (The Right Stuff)" and "Billie Jean", "Like a Prayer", "Lego House", and "Apologize". The album also includes The Collective's debut single "Surrender", and a cover of Wham!'s "Last Christmas".

=== Singles ===
"Surrender" was written by David Musumeci, Anthony Egizii and William Singe, and was produced by Musumeci and Egizii under their stage name DNA Songs. The song would have been The Collective's winner's single for The X Factor, if they had won the show. It was released digitally on 23 November, and physically on 28 November. "Surrender" debuted and peaked at number six on the ARIA Singles Chart dated 3 December and was certified gold by the Australian Recording Industry Association (ARIA), denoting sales of 35,000 copies. "Last Christmas" was digitally released on 14 December, as the second single from the album, but failed to enter the ARIA Singles Chart.

== Promotion ==
On 13 December 2012, The Collective performed "Surrender" at the Crown Street Mall in Wollongong, New South Wales and signed CD copies of the single for fans. The following day, they performed "Surrender" on Sunrise, and a medley of "Silent Night" and "Have Yourself a Merry Little Christmas" on The Morning Show. On 15 and 16 December, The Collective toured Westfield shopping malls in Woden Valley, Australian Capital Territory and Miranda, New South Wales with X Factor winner Samantha Jade, to perform for fans and sign CD copies of their albums for fans. The Collective performed "Last Christmas" at the annual Carols in the Domain concert in Sydney, New South Wales on 22 December. The Collective album debuted at number 11 on the ARIA Albums Chart dated 24 December 2012. The following week, the album descended to number 20. The Collective was certified gold, denoting shipments of 35,000 copies.

== Track listing ==
No.	Title	Writer(s)	Length
1.	"Surrender"	David Musumeci; Anthony Egizii; William Singe	3:47
2.	"Domino" (Jessie J song)	Jessica Cornish; Lukasz Gottwald; Claude Kelly; Max Martin; Henry Walter; William Singe	3:29
3.	"Footloose" (Kenny Loggins song)	Kenny Loggins; Dean Pitchford; William Singe	3:23
4.	"You Got It (The Right Stuff) / Billie Jean" (New Kids on the Block and Michael Jackson medley)	Maurice Starr; Michael Jackson	3:27
5.	"Like a Prayer" (Madonna song)	Madonna; Patrick Leonard; William Singe	3:30
6.	"Lego House" (Ed Sheeran song)	Ed Sheeran; Jake Gosling; Chris Leonard	3:40
7.	"Apologize" (OneRepublic song)	Ryan Tedder	3:30
8.	"Last Christmas" (Wham! song)	George Michael; William Singe	3:23

== Charts ==
=== Weekly charts ===
Chart (2012)	Peak position
ARIA Albums Chart	11

=== Year-end charts ===
Chart (2012)	Position
Australian Artist Albums (ARIA)	26

== Certifications ==
Region	Certification	Certified units/sales
Australia (ARIA)	Gold	35,000^{^}
^{^} Shipments figures based on certification alone.

== Release history ==
Country	Date	Format	Label
Australia	14 December 2012	CD, digital download	Sony Music Australia
