= Jess & Matt =

Australian pop duo

- Origin: New South Wales, Australia
- Genre: Pop
- Years active: 2014–present
- Labels: Sony Music Australia (2015–2018), Independent (2019–present)
- Members: Jess Dunbar; Matt Price
- Website: www.jessandmattlive.com

Jess & Matt are a pop music duo consisting of husband and wife Jess Dunbar and Matt Price. They started out as solo artists but became a duo in 2014.

== Career ==
=== 2015: The X Factor ===
In 2015, Jess & Matt auditioned for season seven of The X Factor Australia singing "Georgia" by Vance Joy. In the second week of the live shows, Jess & Matt were in the bottom two with fellow category member, The Fisher Boys, but Jess & Matt were saved by the judges in a majority vote. However, voting statistics revealed that The Fisher Boys received more votes than Jess & Matt, which meant that if the result went to deadlock, Jess & Matt would have been eliminated. They made it to the Grand Final and were mentored by Guy Sebastian, ultimately being the last contestant eliminated behind Cyrus Villanueva and Louise Adams.

denotes a performance that entered the ARIA Singles. denotes having been in the bottom two.

The X Factor performances and results (2015)
| Episode | Song | Original Artist | Result |
|---|---|---|---|
| Audition | "Georgia" | Vance Joy | Through to bootcamp |
| Bootcamp | "Say Something" | A Great Big World | Through to super home visits |
| Super home visits | "Let It Go" | James Bay | Through to live shows |
| Live show 1 | "Heart of Glass" | Blondie | Safe |
| Live show 2 | "Ignition (Remix)" | R. Kelly | Bottom two |
| Live show 2 Showdown | "Fall at Your Feet" | Crowded House | Saved |
| Live show 3 | "Do You Remember" | Jarryd James | Safe |
| Live show 4 | "Sweet Disposition" | The Temper Trap | Bottom two |
| Live show 4 Showdown | "Thinking Out Loud" | Ed Sheeran | Saved |
| Live show 5 | "Dancing in the Dark" | Bruce Springsteen | Safe |
| Live show 6 | "Stay" | Rihanna | Safe |
| Live show 7 | "You're the One That I Want" | John Travolta and Olivia Newton-John | Safe |
| Live show 8 | "Need You Now" | Lady Antebellum | Safe |
| Live show 8 | "I Was Made for Lovin' You" | Kiss | Safe |
| Grand Final | "Georgia" | Vance Joy | Eliminated |
| Grand Final | "Nothing Matters" | Jess & Matt | Eliminated |
| Grand Final | "Stay with Me" | Sam Smith | Eliminated |

=== 2016–2017: Jess & Matt and Belmont Street ===
Immediately after The X Factor 2015, Jess & Matt signed with Sony Music Australia and released their would-have-been winners single "Nothing Matters". It debuted and peaked at number 29. They released their debut self-titled album in December, which featured studio re-recorded tracks of some of their performances on the show. It peaked at number 9. In July 2016, they released "Bones".

On 25 January 2017, Jess & Matt released "Sydney to Me" to coincide with their Australia Day concert performance. An EP Belmont Street was released on 10 February 2017.

=== 2018: Songs from the Village and wedding ===
In June 2018, the duo released their second studio album Songs from the Village which peaked at number 11 on the ARIA charts.

On 8 September, 2018, the duo married in the Hunter Valley.

In October, they were part of the 100 judges on All Together Now.

=== 2019–present: Independent Artists and Wildflowers ===
In 2019, the duo left Sony and in November 2019, the duo released their first independent single, "Know About You", with the video premiering in January 2020.

In June 2021, the duo announced the released of their third studio, and first of original music, titled Wildflowers released on 9 July 2021.

== Discography ==
=== Albums ===
| Title | Details | Peak chart positions |
| Title | Details | AUS |
|---|---|---|
| Jess & Matt | Released: 16 December 2015 (Australia); Label: Sony Music Australia; Formats: CD, digital download | 9 |
| Songs from the Village | Released: 15 June 2018 (Australia); Label: Sony Music Australia; Formats: CD, digital download, streaming | 11 |
| Wildflowers | Released: 9 July 2021; Label: Jess & Matt; Formats: CD, digital download, streaming | 11 |

=== Extended plays ===
| Title | Details | Peak chart positions |
| Title | Details | AUS |
|---|---|---|
| Belmont Street | Released: 10 February 2017 (Australia); Label: Sony Music Australia; Format: Digital download | 20 |

=== Singles ===
| Year | Title | Peak chart positions | Album |
| Year | Title | AUS | Album |
|---|---|---|---|
| 2015 | "Nothing Matters" | 29 | Jess & Matt |
| 2016 | "Bones" | — | non album single |
| 2017 | "Sydney to Me" | — | Belmont Street |
| 2018 | "The Times They Are A-Changin'" | — | Songs from the Village |
| 2018 | "Both Sides Now" | — | Songs from the Village |
| 2018 | "The Sound of Silence" (featuring Chris Isaak) | — | Songs from the Village |
| 2019 | "Know About You" | — | non album single |
| 2021 | "Aftermath" | — | Wildflowers |
| 2021 | "Wreckage" | — | Wildflowers |
| 2021 | "Home Ain't a Home" | — | Wildflowers |

=== Other charting singles ===
| Year | Title | Peak chart positions | Album |
| Year | Title | AUS | Album |
|---|---|---|---|
| 2015 | "Do You Remember" | 53 | Jess & Matt |
| 2015 | "You're the One That I Want" | 30 | Jess & Matt |
