= She's Rock n Roll =

EP by In Stereo
- Released: 1 April 2016
- Genre: Pop, pop rock
- Length: 22:53
- Label: Days of Sound / Warner Music Australia

In Stereo chronology
She's Rock n Roll (2016)	The Speed of Sound (2016)

Singles from She's Rock n Roll
- 1. "Honest" Released: 19 February 2016

She's Rock n Roll is the debut extended play by Australian boy band In Stereo (Jakob Delgado, Ethan Karpathy, and Chris Lanzon). It was released on 1 April 2016 and debuted at number 11 on the Australian Albums Chart. The EP features original tracks co-written by the three 15-year-old members.

== Background ==
In 2015, In Stereo auditioned for season 7 of The X Factor Australia, singing "Style" by Taylor Swift. They made it to the top 12 and were mentored by Guy Sebastian. They were eliminated on 20 October, coming in eighth place.

Following the elimination, the trio signed a record deal with Warner Music Australia. Their first single, "Honest", a collaboration with James Yammouni of The Janoskians, was released on 19 February 2016 and debuted at number 51 on the ARIA singles chart. The EP was released on 1 April 2016.

== Track listing ==
No.	Title	Writer(s)	Length
1.	"Good Enough"	Christopher Lanzon	3:18
2.	"Messed Up Weekend"	Joel Chapman; Christian Lorusso; Hayley Warner	2:52
3.	"Good Times"	Emily Jacqueline Hanks; Roberto De Sa; Reese Szabo	3:18
4.	"She's Rock n Roll"	Jakob Delgado; Ethan Karpathy; Christopher Lanzon; David Simon; Daniel Skeed	3:17
5.	"Honest" (with James Yammouni)	Marque Benedicto	3:06
6.	"The Speed of Sound"	Hein Cooper; Jakob Delgado; Christopher Lanzon; Liam Quinn	4:03
7.	"Honest" (acoustic)	Benedicto	2:59

== Charts ==
Chart (2016)	Peak position
Australian Albums (ARIA)	11
Australian Artist Albums Chart	2

== Release history ==
Country	Date	Format	Label	Catalogue
Australia	1 April 2016	CD, digital download	Days of Sound, Warner Music Australia	5419708992
