= Keep Talking (Cyrus song) =

Single by Cyrus
- Released: 12 February 2016
- Recorded: 2016
- Genre: Pop
- Length: 3:24
- Label: Sony
- Songwriters: Cyrus; Anthony Egizii; David Musumeci
- Producer: DNA Songs

Cyrus singles chronology
"Stone" (2015)	"Keep Talking" (2016)	"Hurt Anymore" (2016)

Music video
- "Keep Talking" on YouTube

"Keep Talking" is a song by Australian singer-songwriter and winner of season 7 of The X Factor Australia Cyrus Villanueva. It was released digitally and on CD single on 12 February 2016. The song debuted at number 44 on the ARIA Singles Chart. The music video was released on 11 February 2016.

Cyrus explains the song is about the breaking down of a relationship, saying "This song is about that helpless point in a relationship where nothing you seem to do can make it better. You might change what you do and take the blame – even when you think you shouldn't, hoping that will fix it. It's at that moment when you realise that walking away is the only thing you can do, but also is the thing that was meant to happen."

Cyrus performed "Keep Talking" live on The Morning Show and The Daily Edition on 2 March 2016.

== Track listing ==
- Digital download
1. "Keep Talking" – 3:32
- CD single
1. "Keep Talking" – 3:24
2. "Keep Talking" (Acoustic) – 3:24

== Charts ==
Chart (2016)	Peak position
Australia (ARIA)	44

== Release history ==
Country	Date	Format	Label	Catalogue
Australia	12 February 2016	Digital download / CD	Sony Music Australia	88985302052
