= Cyrus (album) =

Studio album by Cyrus
- Released: 9 December 2015
- Recorded: 2015
- Genre: Pop
- Length: 41:35
- Label: Sony

Singles from Cyrus
- 1. "Stone" Released: 24 November 2015

Professional ratings
Review scores
Source	Rating
Renowned for Sound	4/5 stars

Cyrus is the self-titled debut studio album by Cyrus, the winner of the seventh season of The X Factor Australia, released through Sony Music Australia on 9 December 2015. The album peaked at number nine on the ARIA Albums Chart and was certified Gold by the Australian Recording Industry Association for shipments of 35,000 copies. It was preceded by the lead single "Stone", which debuted at number four on the ARIA Singles Chart. The album features re-recorded studio tracks of some of the songs he performed on the show including his winning single, "Stone".

== Review ==
Jessica Thomas of Renowned for Sound said, "Cyrus sees Cyrus take his brand of smooth pop covering a plethora of popular tracks and breathing a fresh life into them. There are 11 songs on his debut and while the 10 cover performances boast a very similar aesthetic to the original tune they're all infused with that Cyrus twist which makes them stand well on their own." nnm

== Track listing ==
No.	Title	Writer(s)	Length
1.	"Stone"	TMS; Bobby Andonov; Sean Douglas	3:32
2.	"Dancing on My Own" (Robyn song)	Robyn; Patrik Berger	3:36
3.	"Earned It" (The Weeknd song)	Abel Tesfaye; Stephan Moccio; Jason "DaHeala" Quenneville; Ahmad Balshe	3:57
4.	"Wicked Game" (Chris Isaak song)	Chris Isaak	3:34
5.	"Hold Back the River" (James Bay song)	Iain Archer; James Bay	3:29
6.	"Rumour Has It" (Adele song)	Adele; Ryan Tedder	3:36
7.	"Knockin' on Heaven's Door" (Bob Dylan song)	Bob Dylan	2:55
8.	"Jealous" (Labrinth song)	Timothy McKenzie; Josh Kear; Natalie Hemby	4:41
9.	"Don’t" (Ed Sheeran song)	Ed Sheeran; Benjamin Levin	3:35
10.	"Love Me like You Do" (Ellie Goulding song)	Max Martin; Savan Kotecha; Ilya Salmanzadeh; Ali Payami; Tove Lo	4:16
11.	"In the Air Tonight" (Phil Collins song)	Phil Collins	4:24
Total length:			41:35

== Charts ==
=== Weekly charts ===
Chart (2015)	Peak position
Australian Albums (ARIA)	9

=== Year-end charts ===
Chart (2015)	Position
Australian Albums (ARIA)	58

== Certifications ==
Region	Certification	Certified units/sales
Australia (ARIA)	Gold	35,000^{^}
^{^} Shipments figures based on certification alone.

== Release history ==
Country	Date	Format	Label
Australia	9 December 2015	CD; digital download	Sony Music Australia
