= The Voice Kids (Australian TV series) =

Australian television show

- Genre: Reality television
- Created by: John de Mol Jr.
- Presented by: Darren McMullen
- Judges: Mel B; Delta Goodrem; The Madden Brothers
- Country of origin: Australia
- Original language: English
- No. of seasons: 1
- No. of episodes: 9

Production
- Executive producers: John de Mol; Julie Waro; Geraldine Orrock; Louise Perryman; Lee Metzger
- Production locations: Fox Studios, Sydney
- Running time: 60–121 minutes
- Production companies: Shine Australia; Talpa Productions

Original release
- Network: Nine Network
- Release: 22 June – 10 August 2014

Related
- The Voice (Australian TV series); The Voice (franchise)

The Voice Kids is an Australian television talent show that premiered on the Nine Network on 22 June 2014. It featured Delta Goodrem, Mel B and The Madden Brothers as the coaches.

== Development ==
=== Auditions ===
Cities where the auditions were held

The auditions were opened to anyone between the age of 8 and 14, as of 1 January 2014. Contestants were to submit an online application via The Voice official website, which ended on 24 September 2013. Selected applicants out of the 8,000 hopefuls who applied for the auditions were invited to the producers' auditions in various capital cities. Two of the audition cities were Perth, Western Australia, held on 18 October 2013; and Adelaide, South Australia.

The producers' auditions consisted of three stages. Firstly, the contestants were grouped and had to sing a song together. Selected contestants from the first stage then moved on to the second stage, where they had to sing for The Voice Kids head vocal coach, Lindsay Field. The last stage of the auditions required the contestants to sing for the show's executive producers.

For the online applicants who live more than 200 km away from their capital cities, they were not invited to the producers' auditions. Instead, the producers reviewed each of their online audition videos. At the end of the auditions, the producers narrowed down the artists to the 100 who progressed onto the Blinds to perform for the coaches.

=== Promotion ===
A special look at the series was premiered on 27 May 2014, featuring various artists from the Blinds covering an acoustic version of The Black Eyed Peas' "Let's Get It Started".

=== Format ===
The show is part of The Voice franchise and is structured as three phases: blind auditions, battle rounds and live performance shows. The winner receives a recording contract with Universal Music.

==== Blind auditions ====
Three coaches, all noteworthy recording artists, choose teams of contestants through a blind audition process. Each coach has the length of the audition, a live performance lasting about one minute, to decide if he or she wants that singer on his or her team. If two or more judges want the same singer, the singer has the final choice of coach.

=== Coaches and hosts ===
The coaches of The Voice Kids – season one

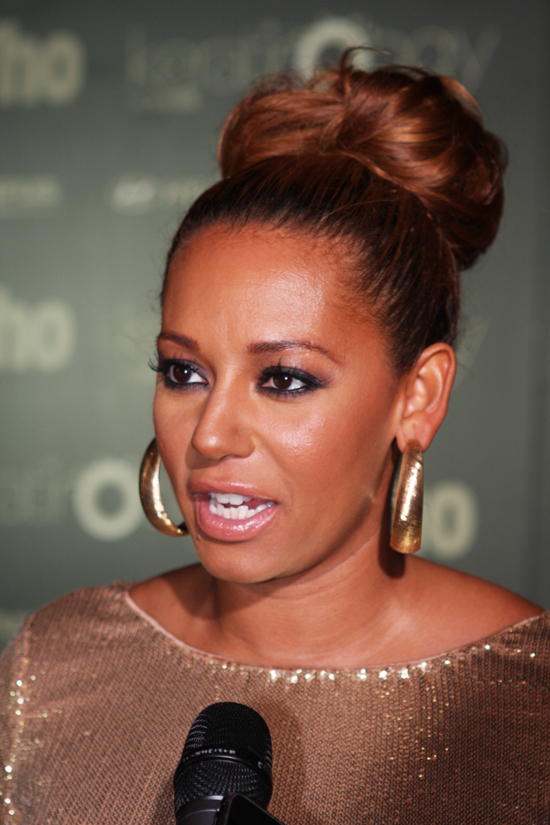
Mel B

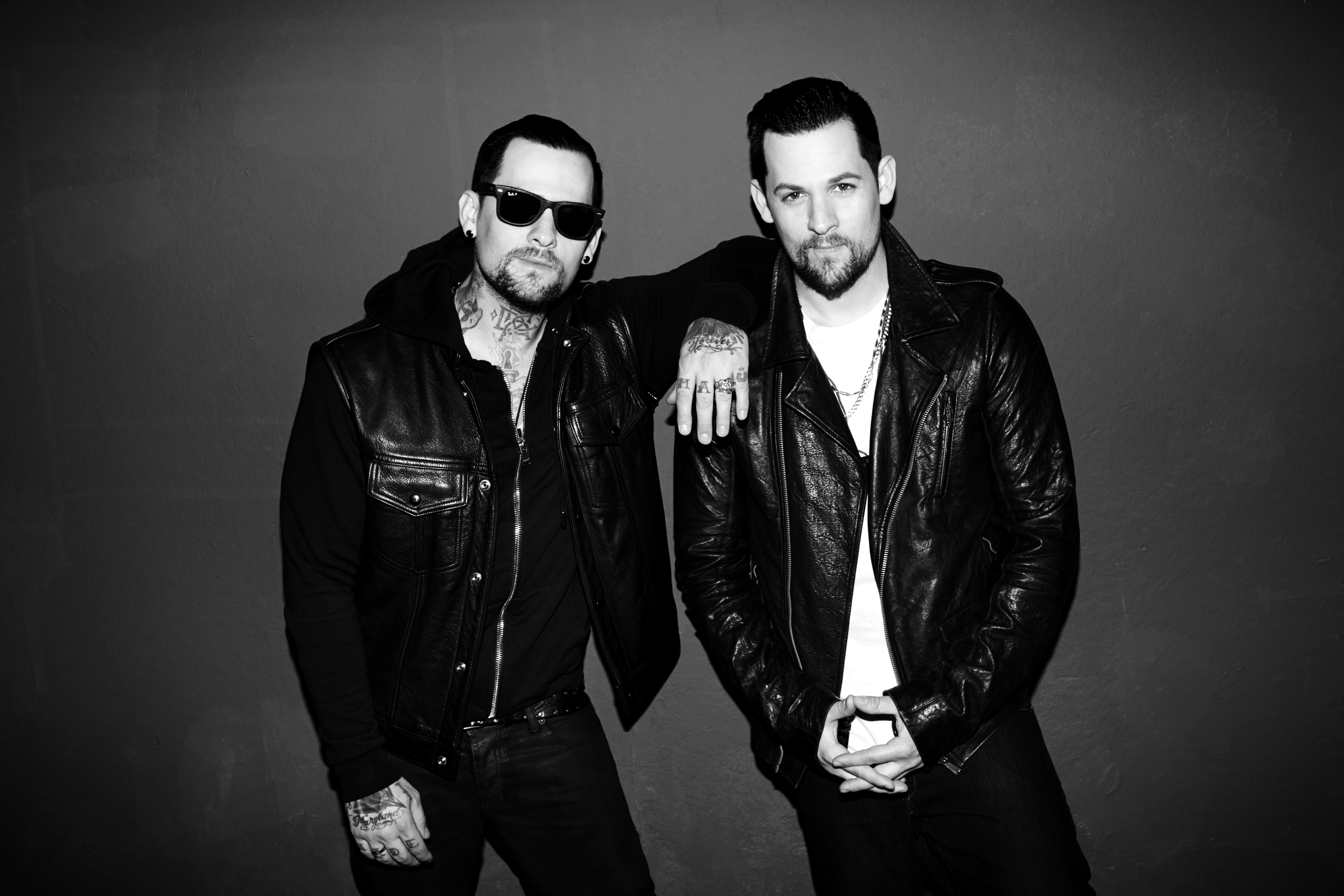
The Madden Brothers

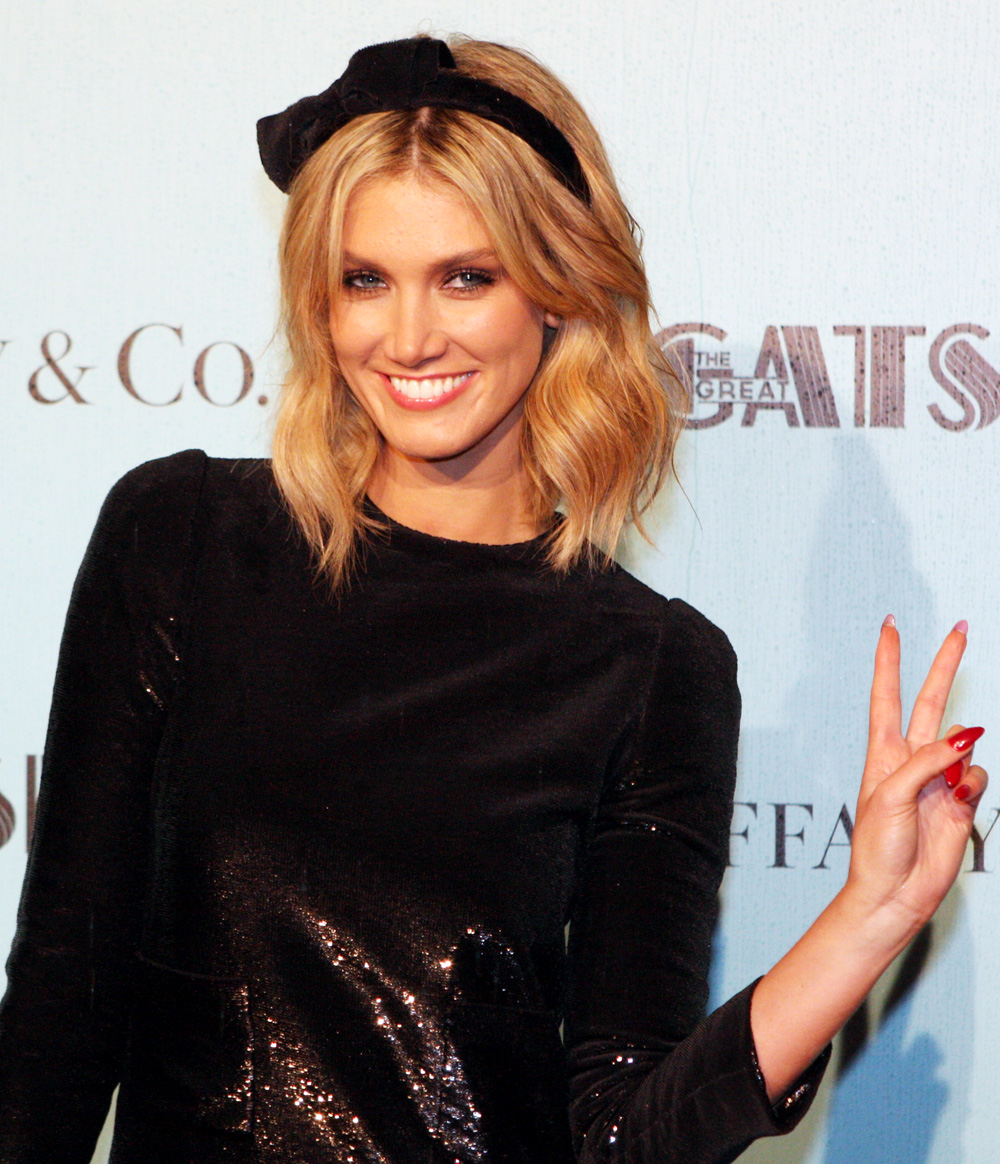
Delta Goodrem

On 26 November 2013, it was announced that Delta Goodrem and Joel Madden, who were the coaches from the adult version of the show, had signed on as the first two coaches. Goodrem announced her departure from the adult version of the show to focus on her music career, but decided to join The Voice Kids as it "allows her the time to continue working on the show, and to focus on new music". In her announcement, she also revealed that Joel would be joining her in the show. On 1 February 2014, Nine Network revealed that former Spice Girls member Mel B and Good Charlotte's Benji Madden were the final two coaches for the series. Benji would team up with his brother Joel on the show.

Darren McMullen, who is also the host for the adult version, was announced as the show's first host. The Voice season 1 quarter-finalist Prinnie Stevens was announced as the show's backstage correspondent during the Blinds.

== Series overview ==
The Voice Kids series overview
Season	First aired	Last aired	Winner	Runners-up		Winning coach	Hosts	Coaches (chairs' order)		
Season	First aired	Last aired	Winner	Runners-up		Winning coach	Hosts	1	2	3
1	22 June 2014	10 Aug 2014	Alexa Curtis	Maddison Milewski	Bella Yoseski	Delta Goodrem	Darren McMullen, Prinnie Stevens	Mel B	Joel & Benji	Delta

== Teams ==
Colour key

- Winner
- Runner-up
- Third Place
- Eliminated in the Grand Finale
- Eliminated in the Sing-offs
- Eliminated in the Battles

Coaches	Top 45 Artists				
Mel B					
Mel B	Maddison Milewski	Ruhi Lavaki	Adina Herz	April Aitken	Gemma Nha
Mel B	Kayla Jo Piscopo	Chloe Marshall	Eve Erdmanis	Molly Waters	Issy Salisbury
Mel B	Malia Mataele	Abigail Adriano	Belinda Jo Barichello	Molly Sneddon	Jordan Koulos
The Madden Brothers					
The Madden Brothers	Bella Yoseski	Chris Lanzon	Imogen Spendlove	Lenisa Di Clemente	Martha Chess-Phelps
The Madden Brothers	Trinity Young	Jack Hermans	Ellie Ferguson	Georgia Hassarati	Fletcher Pilon
The Madden Brothers	Sienna Perruzza	Jack Lyall	Mi-Kaisha Masella	Sebastian Coe	Reilly Underwood
Delta Goodrem					
Delta Goodrem	Alexa Curtis	Grace Laing	Ethan Karpathy	Harmony Lovegrove	Robbie Anderson
Delta Goodrem	Olivia Swinton	Jasmine Dale	Isabella Galvez	Mira Molly	Angus Ross
Delta Goodrem	Anthony & Tamara	Elina Jayamanna	Jamie Cumberlidge	Shuan Hern Lee	Ky Baldwin

== Blind auditions ==
The first episode of the Blinds premiered on 22 June 2014. Each coach had the length of the auditioner's performance to decide if they want that artist to be on their team; if more than one coach wants the same artist, then the artist gets to choose their coach.

Blind auditions colour key
✔	Coach hit the "I/WE WANT YOU" button
	Artist defaulted to this coach's team
	Artist elected to join this coach's team
	Artist eliminated with no coach pressing the button
	Artist received an 'All Turn'

=== Episode 1 (22 June) ===
The premiere episode aired for one hour and a half and was viewed by 1.652 million people.

Order	Artist	Age	Hometown	Song	Coach's and artist's choices		
Order	Artist	Age	Hometown	Song	Mel B	Joel & Benji	Delta
1	Bella Yoseki	12	Melbourne, Victoria	"And I Am Telling You I'm Not Going"	✔	✔	✔
2	Chris Lanzon	13	Sydney, New South Wales	"The A Team"	✔	✔	✔
3	Abigail Adriano	9	Sydney, New South Wales	"Empire State of Mind"	✔	✔	✔
4	Molly Sneddon	9	Goulburn, New South Wales	"Not Pretty Enough"	✔	✔	—
5	Katie & Emilie	11	Perth, Western Australia	"Radioactive"	—	—	—
6	Jasmine Dale	10	Sydney, New South Wales	"It's Oh So Quiet"	✔	—	✔
7	Maddison Milewski	13	Gold Coast, Queensland	"At Last"	✔	✔	✔
8	Robbie Anderson	13	Perth, Western Australia	"Hey, Soul Sister"	✔	—	✔

=== Episode 2 (29 June) ===
The second episode was aired for one hour and a half and was viewed by 1.665 million people.

Order	Artist	Age	Hometown	Song	Coach's and artist's choices		
Order	Artist	Age	Hometown	Song	Mel B	Joel & Benji	Delta
1	Alexa Curtis	10	Brisbane, Queensland	"Girl on Fire"	✔	✔	✔
2	Ethan Karpathy	13	Geelong, Victoria	"Give Me Love"	—	✔	✔
3	Trinity Young	8	Central Coast, New South Wales	"Lovin' You"	✔	✔	✔
4	Malia Matabele	12	Wollongong, New South Wales	"Stay"	✔	✔	✔
5	Chris	11	Sydney, New South Wales	"More than This"	—	—	—
6	Elina Jayamanna	8	Melbourne, Victoria	"Part of Your World"	—	—	✔
7	Lenisa Di Clemente	11	Melbourne, Victoria	"A Whole New World"	✔	✔	✔
8	Olivia Swinton	10	Melbourne, Victoria	"Roar"	✔	✔	✔
9	Imogen Spendlove	13	Melbourne, Victoria	"Feeling Good"	✔	✔	✔

=== Episode 3 (6 July) ===
The third episode was aired for one hour and a half and was viewed by 1.255 million people.

Order	Artist	Age	Hometown	Song	Coach's and artist's choices		
Order	Artist	Age	Hometown	Song	Mel B	Joel & Benji	Delta
1	Jamie Cumberlidge	14	Sunshine Coast, Queensland	"Breakeven"	—	✔	✔
2	Sophie	13	Sydney, New South Wales	"Counting Stars"	—	—	—
3	Sienna Perruzza	11	Perth, Western Australia	"Wrecking Ball"	—	✔	—
4	Sebastian Coe	8	Perth, Western Australia	"When I Was Your Man"	✔	✔	✔
5	Harmony Lovegrove	13	Sydney, New South Wales	"What the World Needs Now Is Love"	✔	✔	✔
6	Anthony & Tamara	10/9	Sydney, New South Wales	"We Go Together"	—	—	✔
7	Ruhi Lavaki	11	Sydney, New South Wales	"A Change Is Gonna Come"	✔	✔	✔
8	Romy	12	Sydney, New South Wales	"Turning Tables"	—	—	—
9	April Aitken	12	Brisbane, Queensland	"The Wizard and I"	✔	✔	✔
10	Ellie Ferguson	13	Sunshine Coast, Queensland	"Try"	✔	✔	—
11	Angus Ross	10	Sydney, New South Wales	"Are You Gonna Be My Girl"	—	—	✔

=== Episode 4 (13 July) ===
The fourth episode was aired for one hour and a half and was viewed by 1.150 million people.

Order	Artist	Age	Hometown	Song	Coach's and artist's choices		
Order	Artist	Age	Hometown	Song	Mel B	Joel & Benji	Delta
1	Martha Chess-Phelps	12	Sydney, New South Wales	"Mountain Sound"	✔	✔	✔
2	Mira Molly	10	Sydney, New South Wales	"Defying Gravity"	✔	—	✔
3	Molly Waters	10	Brisbane, Queensland	"Popular"	✔	—	—
4	Ky Baldwin	12	Sydney, New South Wales	"I Want You Back"	✔	—	✔
5	Jordan Koulos	11	TBC, New South Wales	"Locked Out of Heaven"	✔	—	✔
6	Alexander	12	TBC, New South Wales	"Little Things"	—	—	—
7	Mi-Kaisha Masella	13	TBC, New South Wales	"Broken-Hearted Girl"	—	✔	✔
8	Chloe Marshall	11	TBC, New South Wales	"River Deep – Mountain High"	✔	—	—
9	Yasmin	13	Newcastle, New South Wales	"Scar"	—	—	—
10	Isabella Galvez	11	Sydney, New South Wales	"Love on Top"	—	—	✔
11	Belinda Jo Barichello	12	Melbourne, Victoria	"Volare"	✔	—	✔
12	Georgia Hassarati	9	Sydney, New South Wales	"Eye of the Tiger"	—	✔	—
13	Shuan Hern Lee	11	Perth, Western Australia	"Pie Jesu"	—	—	✔

=== Episode 5 (20 July) ===
The fifth episode was aired for one hour and a half and was viewed by 1.227 million people.

Order	Artist	Age	Hometown	Song	Coach's and artist's choices		
Order	Artist	Age	Hometown	Song	Mel B	Joel & Benji	Delta
1	Kayla Jo Piscopo	14	Sydney, New South Wales	"Beneath Your Beautiful"	✔	—	✔
2	Jack Hermans	12	TBC, New South Wales	"We Are Never Ever Getting Back Together"	—	✔	—
3	Eve Erdmanis	11	Melbourne, Victoria	"Still Into You"	✔	—	—
4	Jack Lyall	12	Melbourne, Victoria	"Classic"	✔	✔	✔
5	Issy Salisbury	12	Brisbane, Queensland	"Tomorrow"	✔	—	—
6	Adam	10	TBC, Victoria	"Rockin' Robin"	—	—	—
7	Fletcher Pilon	12	Central Coast, New South Wales	"Flying with the King"	✔	✔	✔
8	Adina Herz	12	TBC, New South Wales	"One Moment in Time"	✔	✔	✔
9	Reilly Underwood	10	TBC, New South Wales	"Grenade"	—	✔	✔
10	Grace Laing	13	Melbourne, Victoria	"Firestarter"	—	Team full	✔
11	Zoe	12	TBC, New South Wales	"Clarity"	—	Team full	Team full
12	Charli	13	TBC, Victoria	"Royals"	—	Team full	Team full
13	Danika	12	TBC, New South Wales	"Acapella"	—	Team full	Team full
14	Gemma Nha	13	Sydney, New South Wales	"Roar"	✔	Team full	Team full

== Battles ==
The battles began on 23 July and comprise episodes 6, 7, and 8. After the Blinds, each coach had 15 artists for the battles. Each battle consisted of three artists within each team and concluded with the respective coach eliminating two of the three artists. The five winners for each coach advanced to the Sing-offs.

Battles colour key
Artist won the battle and advanced to the sing-offs
Artist lost the battle and was eliminated

=== Episode 6 (23 July) ===
The sixth episode was aired for one hour and a half.

Coach	Order	Winner	Song	Losers	
Madden Brothers	1	Imogen	"Never Let Me Go"	Ellie	Mi-Kaisha
Mel B	2	Gemma	"Firework"	Issy	Jordan
Delta Goodrem	3	Robbie	"I'm a Believer"	Angus	Ky
Mel B	4	Ruhi	"Halo"	Abigail	Chloe
Madden Brothers	5	Lenisa	"Our Lips Are Sealed"	Georgia	Sebastian
Delta Goodrem	6	Grace	"Burn"	Elina	Jasmine

=== Episode 7 (27 July) ===
The seventh episode was aired for one hour and a half.

Coach	Order	Winner	Song	Losers	
Mel B	1	Maddison	"Diamonds"	Kayla Jo	Malia
Madden Brothers	2	Chris	"Wake Me Up"	Jack H	Jack L
Mel B	3	April	"Over the Rainbow"	Molly S	Molly W
Delta Goodrem	4	Ethan	"Story of My Life"	Isabella	Jamie
Madden Brothers	5	Bella	"When You Believe"	Sienna	Trinity
Delta Goodrem	6	Alexa	"Stop"	Anthony & Tamara	Olivia

=== Episode 8 (3 August) ===
The eighth episode was aired for one hour and a half. It featured the last three battles, followed by the premiere of the Sing-offs.

Coach	Order	Winner	Song	Losers	
Mel B	1	Adina	"Wings"	Belinda Jo	Eve
Madden Brothers	2	Martha	"Let Her Go"	Fletcher	Reilly
Delta Goodrem	3	Harmony	"Somewhere Out There"	Mira	Shuan

== Sing-offs ==
The Sing-offs began after the battles. The top fifteen artists perform for the coaches, with each coach eliminating three artists from their teams. The remaining top six artists advance to the Grand Finale.

Sing-offs colour key
Artist was saved by his/her coach and advanced to the Grand Finale
Artist was eliminated

=== Episode 8 (3 August) ===
The eighth episode was aired for one hour and a half. It featured the last three rounds of the Battles, followed by the premiere of the Sing-offs. In this phase, all artists reprised their performance from the Blinds.

Coach	Order	Artist	Song	Result
Mel B	1	Maddison	"At Last"	Advanced
Mel B	2	Gemma	"Roar"	Eliminated
Mel B	3	Ruhi	"A Change Is Gonna Come"	Advanced
Mel B	4	Adina	"One Moment in Time"	Eliminated
Mel B	5	April	"The Wizard and I"	Eliminated
Madden Brothers	6	Imogen	"Feeling Good"	Eliminated
Madden Brothers	7	Chris	"The A Team"	Advanced
Madden Brothers	8	Lenisa	"A Whole New World"	Eliminated
Madden Brothers	9	Martha	"Mountain Sound"	Eliminated
Madden Brothers	10	Bella	"And I Am Telling You I'm Not Going"	Advanced
Delta Goodrem	11	Grace	"Firestarter"	Advanced
Delta Goodrem	12	Harmony	"What the World Needs Now Is Love"	Eliminated
Delta Goodrem	13	Robbie	"Hey, Soul Sister"	Eliminated
Delta Goodrem	14	Ethan	"Give Me Love"	Eliminated
Delta Goodrem	15	Alexa	"Girl on Fire"	Advanced

== Grand Finale ==
The Grand finale is the final phase of the competition and was aired on 10 August. Unlike the adult version of the show, the Grand Finale was taped on 14 June 2014, with the final three's separate winning moments being pre-recorded. The public votes decided which of the three winning moments would go on air at the end of the show, crowning the respective artist as The Voice Kids.

Grand Finale colour key
Artist is the winner
Artist is the runner-up
Artist is the third placer
Artist was saved by his/her coach and advanced to the next round
Artist was eliminated

=== Episode 9 (10 August) ===
==== Round 1 ====
In this phase, each finalist took the stage and performed a solo song. The coaches then eliminated one artist from their respective teams, forming the final three artists who advanced to the next round.

Coach	Order	Artist	Song	Result
Mel B	1	Ruhi	"Fighter"	Advanced
Mel B	2	Maddison	"If I Ain't Got You"	Eliminated
Madden Brothers	3	Chris	"Riptide"	Eliminated
Madden Brothers	4	Bella	"Let It Go"	Advanced
Delta Goodrem	5	Grace	"Vision of Love"	Eliminated
Delta Goodrem	6	Alexa	"Colors of the Wind"	Advanced

==== Round 2 ====
The final round of the competition featured the top three finalists singing their potential winner's single. For the first time in the series, an interactive viewer component was featured. Before the start of the performances, voting lines were opened live-in-show for the television audience to vote for the final three and decide the winner. The 15-minute voting window was opened between 8:25 p.m. and 8:40 p.m. The winner of The Voice Kids was announced at the end of the show.

Coach	Order	Artist	Song	Result
Mel B	1	Ruhi	"Listen"	Runner-up
Madden Brothers	2	Bella	"The Voice Within"	Third Place
Delta Goodrem	3	Alexa	"Hero"	Winner

Non-competition performances
Order	Performer	Song
1	The Top 6 (Alexa, Bella, Chris, Grace, Maddison, and Ruhi)	"Happy"
2	Justice Crew	"Que Sera"

=== Results per team ===
Sing-offs and Grand Finale results per team
Artist	Sing-offs	Grand Finale: round 1	Grand Finale: round 2
Ruhi Lavaki	Coach's choice	Coach's choice	Runner-up
Maddison Milewski	Coach's choice	Eliminated	
Adina Herz	Eliminated		
April Aitken	Eliminated		
Gemma Nha	Eliminated		
Bella Yoseski	Coach's choice	Coach's choice	Third Place
Chris Lanzon	Coach's choice	Eliminated	
Imogen Spendlove	Eliminated		
Lenisa Di Clemente	Eliminated		
Martha Chess-Phelps	Eliminated		
Alexa Curtis	Coach's choice	Coach's choice	Winner
Grace Laing	Coach's choice	Eliminated	
Ethan Karpathy	Winner		
Harmony Lovegrove	Eliminated		
Robbie Anderson	Eliminated		

== Performances by guests/coaches ==
Episode	Show segment	Performer	Title	ARIA reaction	Source
9	Grand Finale	Justice Crew	"Que Sera"		

== Artists' appearances on earlier talent shows ==
- Harmony and Imogen competed in the Network Ten reality television show Young Talent Time in 2012. Imogen was eliminated in the semifinals; while Harmony was a wildcard contender for the grand-final, but failed to progress. Imogen also appeared on Season 9 of Australian Idol.
- Shuan and Ky appeared on the fourth and fifth season of Australia's Got Talent respectively, making it to the semifinals.

== Music releases by The Voice Kids artists ==
A compilation album titled The Voice Kids 2014 was released on 10 August 2014. Though planned to be released on 11 August 2014, the album was released digitally through iTunes a few hours before the Grand Finale on 10 August 2014. The album features 12 cover songs from the top six finalists.

The Voice Kids 2014

Compilation album by Various Artists
- Released: 10 August 2014
- Recorded: 2014; Secret Sound Studios
- Genre: Pop
- Length: 41:42
- Label: Universal Music Australia

=== Track listing ===
No.	Title	Writer(s)	Original artist	Length
1.	"Colors of the Wind" (Alexa Curtis)	Alan Menken; Stephen Schwartz	Judy Kuhn	4:18
2.	"Burn" (Grace Laing)	Ryan Tedder; Ellie Goulding; Greg Kurstin; Noel Zancanella; Brent Kutzle	Ellie Goulding	3:14
3.	"And I Am Telling You I'm Not Going" (Bella Yoseski)	Tom Eyen; Henry Krieger	Jennifer Holliday	3:14
4.	"Riptide" (Chris Lanzon)	James Keogh	Vance Joy	3:23
5.	"Diamonds" (Maddison Milewski)	Sia Furler; Benjamin Levin; Mikkel S. Eriksen; Tor Erik Hermansen	Rihanna	3:15
6.	"If I Ain't Got You" (Ruhi Lavaki)	Alicia Keys	Alicia Keys	3:46
7.	"Girl on Fire" (Alexa Curtis)	Alicia Keys; Salaam Remi; Jeff Bhasker; Billy Squier	Alicia Keys	3:22
8.	"Vision of Love" (Grace Laing)	Mariah Carey; Ben Margulies	Mariah Carey	3:27
9.	"Let It Go" (Bella Yoseski)	Kristen Anderson-Lopez; Robert Lopez	Idina Menzel	3:46
10.	"Wake Me Up" (Chris Lanzon)	Tim Bergling; Aloe Blacc; Mike Einziger	Avicii	3:19
11.	"Fighter" (Maddison Brooke)	Christina Aguilera; Scott Storch	Christina Aguilera	3:47
12.	"A Change Is Gonna Come" (Ruhi Lavaki)	Sam Cooke	Sam Cooke	2:51

=== Release history ===
Region	Date	Format	Label	Catalogue
Australia	10 August 2014	CD, digital download	Universal Music Australia	3796135

== Concert tour by The Voice Kids artists ==
The Voice Kids: The Concert
- Tour by The Voice Kids & Harrison Craig
- Associated album: The Voice Kids 2014
- Start date: 26 September 2014
- End date: 3 October 2014
- Legs: 1
- No. of shows: 6 in Australia
The Voice Kids tour chronology
- The Voice Kids: The Concert
- (2014)
- The Voice Kids: The Concert
- (2015)
Harrison Craig tour chronology
- More Than a Dream Tour
- (2013)
- The Voice Kids: The Concert
- (2014)

The Voice Kids: The Concert is a concert tour in Australia that features the artists of the first season of The Voice Kids, with the winner of the second season of The Voice Harrison Craig appearing as a special guest. The 6-date tour began on 26 September 2014 in Penrith, New South Wales and ended on 3 October 2014 in Melbourne, Victoria. The tour took place during the September school holidays in Australia and each concert lasted for two hours.

=== Performers ===
Alexa Curtis (Winner)	Bella Yoseski (Runner-up)
Maddison Brooke (Runner-up)	Chris Lanzon (4th–6th place)
Grace Laing (4th–6th place)	Ruhi Lavaki (4th–6th place)
Ethan Karpathy (7th–15th place)	Robbie Anderson (7th–15th place)
Harrison Craig (special guest)

=== Setlist ===
- All – "Let's Get It Started"
- Harrison Craig – "Unchained Melody"
- Craig – "You Raise Me Up"
- Craig – "It Had Better Be Tonight"
- Alexa Curtis – "Girl on Fire"
- Curtis – "Colors of the Wind"
- Curtis – "Playground"
- Bella Yoseski – "The Voice Within"
- Yoseski – "Mamma Knows Best"
- Maddison Brooke – "Fighter"
- Brooke – "Unconditionally"
- Chris Lanzon – "The A Team"
- Lanzon – "Wake Me Up"
- Grace Laing – "Almost Is Never Enough"
- Laing – "Burn"
- Ruhi Lavaki – "Dynamite"
- Lavaki – "If I Ain't Got You"
- Robbie Anderson – "Hey, Soul Sister"
- Anderson – "Yeah 3x"
- Ethan Karpathy – "Kiss You"
- Karpathy – "Give Me Love"
- All – "Happy"

=== Additional notes ===
1. Ruhi Lavaki only appeared at the show in Sydney, New South Wales on 28 September 2014.
2. Grace Laing only appeared at the final two shows in Melbourne, Victoria on 2 and 3 October 2014.

=== Tour dates ===
List of concerts, showing date, city, country and venue
Date	City	Country	Venue
26 September 2014	Penrith	Australia	Evan Theatre
27 September 2014	Newcastle	Australia	Newcastle Civic Theatre
28 September 2014	Sydney	Australia	Enmore Theatre
1 October 2014	Canberra	Australia	Canberra Southern Cross Club
2 October 2014	Melbourne	Australia	The Palms at Crown
3 October 2014	Melbourne	Australia	The Palms at Crown

== Ratings ==
The Voice Kids season one consolidated ratings, with metropolitan viewership and nightly position Colour key: – Highest rating during the season – Lowest rating during the season
Episode		Original airdate	Timeslot	Viewers (in millions)	Rank (night)	Ref
1	"Blind Auditions"	22 June 2014	Sunday 6:30 p.m.–8:00 p.m.	1.722	#1	
2	"Blind Auditions"	29 June 2014	Sunday 6:30 p.m.–8:00 p.m.	1.703	#1	
3	"Blind Auditions"	6 July 2014	Sunday 6:30 p.m.–8:00 p.m.	1.307	#5	
4	"Blind Auditions"	13 July 2014	Sunday 6:30 p.m.–8:00 p.m.	1.233	#5	
5	"Blind Auditions"	20 July 2014	Sunday 6:30 p.m.–8:00 p.m.	1.275	#5	
6	"Battles"	23 July 2014	Wednesday 7:30 p.m.–9:00 p.m.	0.888	#10	
7	"Battles"	27 July 2014	Sunday 7:40 p.m.–9:10 p.m.	1.015	#8	
8	"Final battles & Sing-offs"	3 August 2014	Sunday 7:40 p.m.–9:10 p.m.	0.895	#7	
9	"Grand Finale"	10 August 2014	Sunday 7:40 p.m.–9:10 p.m.	0.990	#9	
9	"Winner Announcement"	10 August 2014	Sunday 7:40 p.m.–9:10 p.m.	1.015	#8	

== See also ==
- List of Australian music television shows
- List of Australian television series
- List of programs broadcast by Nine Network
