= Jess & Matt (album) =

Studio album by Jess & Matt
- Released: 16 December 2015
- Recorded: November–December 2016
- Genre: Pop
- Label: Sony Music Australia

Jess & Matt chronology
Jess & Matt (2015)	Belmont Street (2017)

Singles from Jess & Matt
- 1. "Nothing Matters" Released: 30 November 2015

Jess & Matt is the self-titled debut studio album by Jess & Matt. The album includes re-recorded tracks they performed on the seventh season of The X Factor Australia, where they came third. The album was released through Sony Music Australia on 16 December 2015, which peaked at number nine on the ARIA Albums Chart. It was preceded by its lead single "Nothing Matters", which debuted at number 29 on the ARIA Singles Chart.

== Reception ==
Professional ratings
Review scores
Source	Rating
Renowned for Sound	3/5 stars

Lucy Barber-Hancock from Renowned for Sound said; "Jess and Matt provide the kind of well-trained pop vocals which are the ideal blank canvas to carry all of their chosen tunes, whilst still allowing their unique brand of folk-pop to flow right through the album in the form of nifty finger-picked guitars and the pure tone of their vocal acrobatics."

== Track listing ==
No.	Title	Writer(s)	Length
1.	"Nothing Matters"	DNA Songs; Adam Argyle	3:02
2.	"Heart of Glass" (Blondie song)	Debbie Harry; Chris Stein	3:16
3.	"Do You Remember" (Jarryd James song)	Jarryd James; Joel Little	3:40
4.	"Dancing in the Dark" (Bruce Springsteen song)	Bruce Springsteen	3:36
5.	"Stay" (Rihanna featuring Mikky Ekko song)	Mikky Ekko; Justin Parker; Elof Loelv	3:08
6.	"You're the One That I Want" (John Travolta and Olivia Newton-John song)	John Farrar	3:06
7.	"Need You Now" (Lady Antebellum song)	Hillary Scott; Charles Kelley; Dave Haywood; Josh Kear	3:21
8.	"Say Something" (A Great Big World and Christina Aguilera song)	Ian Axel; Chad King; Mike Campbell	3:38
9.	"Lay Me Down" (Sam Smith song)	Sam Smith; James Napier; Elvin Smith	3:05
10.	"I'd Really Love to See You Tonight" (England Dan & John Ford Coley song)	Parker McGee	2:50
11.	"Sister Golden Hair" (America song)	Gerry Beckley	3:11

== Charts ==
Chart (2015/16)	Peak position
Australian Albums (ARIA)	9

== Release history ==
Country	Date	Format	Label	Catalogue
Australia	16 December 2015	CD; digital download	Sony Music Australia	88875189202
