= The Speed of Sound (EP) =

EP by In Stereo
- Released: 1 July 2016
- Genre: Pop, pop rock
- Label: Days of Sound / Warner Music Australia

In Stereo chronology
She's Rock n Roll (2016)	The Speed of Sound (2016)	Day In, Day Out (2017)

The Speed of Sound is the second extended play by Australian boy band In Stereo (Jakob Delgado, Ethan Karpathy and Chris Lanzon). It was released on 1 July 2016.

== Background ==
In 2015, In Stereo auditioned for season 7 of The X Factor Australia and made it to the top 12. The group were eliminated in week 4, coming in eighth place.

Following the elimination, the trio signed a record deal with Warner Music Australia and released their first extended play She's Rock n Roll on 1 April 2016, which peaked at number 11 on the ARIA Chart. The Speed of Sound is the group's second EP.

The group supported the EP with an Australian tour throughout July 2016.

== Track listing ==
No.	Title	Writer(s)	Length
1.	"The Speed of Sound" (remix)	Hein Cooper, Jakob Delgado, Christopher Lanzon, Liam Quinn	3:36
2.	"2AM"	Liam Quinn, Christopher Lanzon, Ethan Karpathy, Jakob Delgado, Tom Williams	3:42
3.	"Perfect 10"	Benjamin Banton, Joshua Banton	3:27
4.	"MYDLM"	Benjamin Banton, Joshua Banton, Tom Williams	3:14
5.	"Dear Diary"	Benjamin Banton, Joshua Banton, David Simon, Jakob Delgado	3:06
6.	"Lois"	Matt Seakins, Samuel Fraser, Tom Weekley	3:55

== Charts ==
Chart (2016)	Peak position
Australian Albums (ARIA)	3

== Release history ==
Country	Date	Format	Label	Catalogue
Australia	1 July 2016	CD, digital download	Days of Sound, Warner Music Australia	5419723112
