= Nothing Matters =

Nothing Matters may refer to:

- "Nothing Matters" (Blackbear song)
- "Nothing Matters" (Jess & Matt song)
- "Nothing Matters" (The Last Dinner Party song)
- "Nothing Matters" (Robert Lloyd and the New Four Seasons song)
- "Nothing Matters" (Vince Staples song)

== See also ==
- "Nothing Else Matters", a song by Metallica
- Nothin' Matters and What If It Did, John Mellencamp album
