= Sydney to Me =

Single by Jess & Matt

from the album Belmont Street
- Released: 25 January 2017
- Genre: Pop
- Length: 3:24
- Label: Sony Music Australia
- Songwriter(s): Jess Dunbar; Matt Price

Jess & Matt singles chronology
"Bones" (2016)	"Sydney to Me" (2017)	"The Times They Are A-Changin'" (2018)

Music video
- "Sydney to Me" on YouTube

"Sydney to Me" is a song performed by Australian duo Jess & Matt, released on 25 January 2017 to coincide with their performance at the Australia Day concert. The song was commissioned by Destination NSW as their new campaign tune. "Sydney to Me" is the lead and only single from the duo's extended play, Belmont Street.

Matt Price told the Daily Telegraph “We got this amazing opportunity, we were invited to collaborate on the song, its our home town so it is an honour to put our feeling about Sydney in to a song” with Jess Dunbar adding “The song is a marriage between our love for the city and our relationship. It is based on all the memories of our relationship around New South Wales.”

In May, the duo performed the song for an episode of American series Bold and the Beautiful during the casts' tour of Australia.

In October, the song was recorded in Mandarin, becoming the first Australian artist to record and release a song in Mandarin in Asia. Via Instagram on 25 October, the duo announced they were invited by the Australian Government and Tourism Body Destination NSW to represent the country at a number of Asian locations and travelled to China to promote the track. In December, Matt and Jess performed the song in Guangzhou, in front of a packed crowd of delegates including NSW Premier Gladys Berejiklian. On 16 December 2017, the duo received a plaque for 1.8 million combined steams.

On 15 February 2018, the duo performed a bilingual version of the song at Madame Tussauds Sydney in Sydney for the Lunar New Year celebrations. Mark Connolly, General Manager of Madame Tussauds Sydney said “Jess and Matt have been a pleasure to work with and are highly favourable amongst our Asian guests from both domestic and international markets – as evident in the turnout last night. Their bilingual performance of Sydney To Me was definitely a highlight of the evening,”

== Reception ==
In a review of the EP, David from auspOp said “"Sydney to Me" is a nice ode to a city they love... It's a great sentiment for a great city.”

Andrew P Street from Sydney Morning Herald was critical of the song saying "[it's] a song that sounds like it was looped on a laptop in someone's bedroom" adding "In short, "Sydney to Me" beautifully reflects up the soul of the city right now: vapid, unengaging, and forged entirely by the forces of naked commerce. It's not a song anyone could love, but it's unambiguously the song that we deserve."

Zanda Wilson described the video as a "shockingly insular, cringeworthy, one-dimensional view of Sydney" adding "the overly synthetic, instrument-free song itself is hardly a redeeming factor".

== Track listings ==
- Digital download
1. "Sydney to Me" (original) – 3:24
- Digital download
1. "Sydney to Me" (studio acoustic) – 1:05
- Digital download
1. "Sydney to Me (싱글)" (Mandarin version) – 3:31

== Release history ==
Country	Date	Version	Format	Label
Australia	25 January 2017	Original	Digital download, streaming	Sony Music Australia
Australia	24 March 2017	Studio acoustic	Digital download, streaming	Sony Music Australia
Australia / China	27 October 2017	Mandarin	Digital download, streaming	Sony Music Australia
