= Wildflowers (Jess & Matt album) =

Studio album by Jess & Matt
- Released: 9 July 2021
- Label: Jess & Matt
- Producer: Patrick Byrne, Jess & Matt

Jess & Matt chronology
Songs from the Village (2018)	Wildflowers (2021)

Singles from Wildflowers
- 1. "Aftermath" Released: 16 April 2021; 2. "Wreckage" Released: 28 May 2021; 3. "Home Ain't a Home" Released: 9 July 2021

Wildflowers is the third studio album and first as independent artists and first to feature only original music by Australian duo, Jess & Matt. The album was released on 9 July 2021 and debuted at number 11 on the ARIA Charts.

In an interview with Gwen van Montfort from Female Jess Dunbar said "Wildflowers is a pretty personal document to our musical freedom and intense self-discovery. We've been writing these songs over the past few years here in Sydney and in Nashville, and stepping out independently gave us the freedom to produce these songs the way we always wanted. The album is a journey of our relationship, with all the struggles and triumphs we've faced over the years. The album concept is a celebration of the silver-lining - it's through the harshest and wildest conditions that wildflowers bloom and flourish."

== Singles ==
- "Aftermath" was released on 16 April 2021 as the album's lead single. Cameron Adams from The Herald Sun complemented the "Brutally honest lyrics" and Music Feeds said "(The video is) a sprawling, visually stunning accompaniment that suits the earthy tones of the song itself, perfectly."
- "Wreckage" was released on 28 May 2021 as the album's second single.
- "Home Ain't a Home" was released on 9 July 2021 as the album's third single. The track is an exploration of what makes the couple's relationship work.

== Track listing ==
No.	Title	Writer(s)	Length
1.	"Sliding Doors"	Jess Dunbar; Matt Price; Kat Higgins; Louis Schoorl	3:10
2.	"1961"	Dunbar; Price	3:42
3.	"Aftermath"	Dunbar; Price; Patrick Byrne	3:46
4.	"Wildflowers"	Dunbar; Price; Steve Solomon; David Hodge	3:04
5.	"Wreckage"	Dunbar; Price; PJ Harding; Schoorl	3:30
6.	"Your Eyes"	Dunbar; Price; Higgins; Lindsay Jackson	3:38
7.	"Home Ain't a Home"	Dunbar; Price; Byrne	3:23
8.	"Best Part of Me"	Dunbar; Price; Phil Barton	3:18
9.	"Strawberry Hills"	Dunbar; Price; Byrne	3:02
10.	"Freeway"	Dunbar; Price; Barton	3:11

== Charts ==
Chart (2021)	Peak position
Australian Albums (ARIA)	11
