= Louise Adams =

Australian singer-songwriter

- Born: 17 December 1983 (age 42)
- Origin: Mount Gambier, South Australia, Australia
- Genres: Blues, rock, soul, folk
- Occupations: Musician, lawyer, event coordinator
- Instruments: Singing, guitar, piano
- Years active: 2010–present
- Label: Sony Music Entertainment
- Formerly of: Louise and the Tornados
- Website: louiseadamsofficial.com

Louise Adams (born 17 December 1983) is an Australian singer-songwriter from Mount Gambier, South Australia. Adams is the runner-up in the seventh season of the X Factor in 2015. Her debut studio album, Louise Adams, was released by Sony Music Entertainment on 15 December 2015, which peaked at No. 22 on the ARIA Albums Chart. Louise also helps mentor and create opportunities for young local Artists. Prior to her music career, Louise was a lawyer.

== Personal life ==
Louise Adams was born in 1983 in South Australia, and has family based in both Mount Gambier and rural Kapunda. From 2013 to 2014 she lived in Castlemaine, where she worked as a lawyer, before returning to South Australia. Adams is married to Andrew Burchell, a winemaker, and they have a daughter.

== Career ==
Adams started singing at local gigs in 2010, which surprised family and friends who had not known her musical talent. She performed across Australia (including the Adelaide Fringe and Tamworth Country Music Festivals), and in South America, the United Kingdom and United States. In 2011 Adams (as part of Louise & The Tornados) was awarded a special commendation in the Best Fringe Music Act category at the Adelaide Fringe Festival.

From 2010 she fronted a band, Louise and the Tornados, which has had a varied line-up. She later reflected, "We had a handful of gigs while I was working as lawyer." In 2013 the line-up had settled with Adams on lead vocals and guitar, Tom Collins on lead guitar, Simon Fennell on drums and Michael Fitzpatrick on double bass. Adams started performing solo sets in Castlemaine, releasing a self-titled EP in June 2014, which featured some of her early original work.

=== The X Factor: 2015 ===
In 2015 Adams auditioned for The X Factor by singing Nina Simone's version of "Feeling Good". She progressed to the boot camp round where she performed "Sugar Man" by Sixto Rodriguez. Adams then made it to the super home visits round in London, where she performed Dolly Parton's "Jolene" in front of her mentor James Blunt and guest mentors Simon Cowell and Rita Ora. She was later selected by Blunt as one of his top three for the live shows; but was in the bottom two with Big T in the eighth week of the show, where she was saved after the judges' vote went to deadlock. Adams made it to the grand final and became the runner-up to Cyrus Villanueva.

Following her appearance on the talent show Adams was signed to Sony Music Australia. She released her debut album Louise Adams on 15 December 2015, which peaked at No. 22 on the ARIA Albums Chart. It included studio recordings of a number of tracks that she performed during her time on show, including her cover version singles, "People Help the People" (October 2015) and "You Don't Own Me" (November), and the non-cover version single, "History" (November).

denotes a performance that entered the ARIA Singles
denotes Runner-Up
denotes Have been in the Bottom two

The X Factor performances and results (2015)
Episode	Song	Original Artist	Result
Audition	"Feeling Good"	Michael Bublé	Through to bootcamp
Bootcamp	"What a Man"	Salt-n-Pepa	Through to super home visits
Super home visits	"Jolene"	Dolly Parton	Through to live shows
Live show 1	"Somebody to Love"	Jefferson Airplane	Safe
Live show 2	"People Help the People"	Birdy	Safe
Live show 3	"Bang Bang (My Baby Shot Me Down)"	Cher	Safe
Live show 4	"Dream On"	Aerosmith	Safe
Live show 5	"Bad Romance"	Lady Gaga	Safe
Live show 6	"You Don't Own Me"	Grace ft. G-Eazy	Safe
Live show 7	"I Put a Spell on You"	Annie Lennox	Safe
Live show 8	"Ain't No Sunshine"	Michael Jackson	Bottom two (3rd)
Live show 8	"Blame It on Me"	George Ezra	Bottom two (3rd)
Live show 8	"Roxanne"	The Police	Safe (Deadlock)
Grand Final	"Feeling Good"	Michael Bublé	Runner-Up
Grand Final	"History"	One Direction	Runner-Up
Grand Final	"Someone Like You"	Adele	Runner-Up
Grand Final	"People Help the People"	Birdy	Runner-Up

=== After The X Factor ===
Adams continued her music career since appearing on The X Factor. On 13 March 2016 she performed at the Rail Lands in Mount Gambier, fronting her accompanying band which features James Van Cooper on lead guitar, Michael Fitzpatrick on double bass and Tom Wilson on drums. Adams appeared on Good Friday (25 March 2016) at the TeamKids Beyond Bank Easter Appeal; other artists include Thirsty Merc, Reece Mastin and Kate Ceberano.

== Discography ==
=== Albums ===
- Louise Adams (15 December 2015) AUS: No. 22
1. "History" (2:51)
2. "Feeling Good" (3:56)
3. "Somebody to Love" (2:53)
4. "People Help the People" (4:01)
5. "Bang Bang" (2:32)
6. "You Don't Own Me" (3:09)
7. "I Put a Spell on You" (2:52)
8. "Ain't No Sunshine" (1:57)
9. "Blame It on Me" (3:13)
10. "Someone Like You" (4:06)
11. "Jolene" (3:16)

=== Extended plays ===
- Louise Adams (June 2014)

=== Singles ===
- "People Help the People" (October 2015) AUS: No. 91
- "You Don't Own Me" (November 2015) AUS: No. 94
- "History" (November 2015) AUS: No. 91
