= Belmont Street (EP) =

EP by Jess & Matt
- Released: 10 February 2017
- Genre: Pop
- Length: 22:58
- Label: Sony Music Australia

Jess & Matt chronology
Jess & Matt (2015)	Belmont Street (2017)	Songs from the Village (2018)

Singles from Belmont Street
- 1. "Sydney to Me" Released: 25 January 2017

Belmont Street is the debut extended play by Jess & Matt. The 6 track EP includes 5 iconic Australian covers and one original song "Sydney to Me" which they performed for the first time on the steps of the Sydney Opera House at the 2017 Australia Day Concert.

== Reception ==
David from AuspOp gave the EP 3 out of 5 saying; "Original track "Sydney to Me" is a nice ode to a city they love" but said from there "...this is where things go downhill".

== Track listing ==
No.	Title	Writer(s)	Length
1.	"Sydney to Me"		3:24
2.	"Never Be Like You" (Flume song)	Harley Streten; Alessia De Gasperis; Brigante Geoffrey; Patrick Earley	3:57
3.	"To Her Door / Sydney from 747" (Paul Kelly song)	Paul Kelly	4:35
4.	"Fall at Your Feet" (Crowded House song)	Neil Finn	3:51
5.	"Feels Like We Only Go Backwards" (Tame Impala song)	Kevin Parker	3:21
6.	"That's Freedom" (John Farnham song)	T. Kimmel, Jean A. Chapman	3:50

== Charts ==
Chart (2017)	Peak position
Australian Albums (ARIA)	20

== Release history ==
Country	Date	Format	Label	Catalogue
Australia	10 February 2017	CD; digital download	Sony Music Australia	88985408792
