= Chris Lanzon =

- Born: Christopher Lanzon; 24 July 2000 (age 25); Australia
- Origin: Sydney, Australia
- Occupation: singer
- Website: chrislanzon.com

Chris Lanzon is an Australian singer from Sydney, and part of Australian boy band In Stereo between 2015 and 2018.

In November 2025, Lanzon released his debut You're Missing the Best Part which debuted at number 38 on the ARIA Charts.

== Career ==
=== 2014: The Voice Kids ===
In 2014, at age of 13, Landon auditioned for The Voice Kids (Australian TV series) and was on The Madden Brothers team. He made the grand final where he was eliminated. His version of "Riptide" appeared on The Voice Kids album.

=== 2015-2018: In Stereo ===
In 2015, Lanzon auditioned for The X Factor (Australian TV series) season 7 as part of In Stereo (band). They made the final 12, and were mentored by Guy Sebastian, eventually placing seventh. The group were signed with Warner Music Australia and released three extended plays, two of which peaked inside the ARIA Chart top 20. before breaking up in 2018. In 2023 Lanzon told NME he felt disillusioned during this time, "I was living a completely inauthentic self. I didn't really feel like there was any sort of substance there that felt true to who I was."

=== 2019-present: Solo ===
In May 2020, Lanzon released the EP Melancholy. This was followed by Far from Perfect in 2021 and Dark Side in 2023.

In 2024 Lanzon released Angel Litany.

In November 2025 Lanzon released his debut album, You're Missing the Best Part.

== Discography ==
=== Studio albums ===
List of studio albums, with selected details and peak chart positions
Title	Details	Peak chart positions
Title	Details	AUS
You're Missing the Best Part	Released: 28 November 2025; Format: LP, digital download; Label: LAB Records, ADA	38

=== Extended plays ===
List of EPs, with selected details and peak chart positions
Title	Details
Melancholy	Released: May 2020; Format: digital; Label: Chris Lanzon
Far from Perfect	Released: 11 June 2021; Format: digital download; Label: Chris Lanzon, Hunnydew
Dark Side	Released: 27 April 2023; Format: digital download; Label: Chris Lanzon, Hunnydew
Angel Litany	Released: September 2024; Format: digital download; Label: Chris Lanzon, Hunnydew
