= Songs from the Village =

Studio album by Jess & Matt
- Released: 15 June 2018
- Genre: Pop
- Label: Sony Music Australia

Jess & Matt chronology
Belmont Street (2017)	Songs from the Village (2018)	Wildflowers (2021)

Singles from Songs from the Village
- 1. "The Times They Are A-Changin'" Released: 26 January 2018; 2. "Both Sides Now" Released: 16 February 2018; 3. "The Sound of Silence" Released: 18 May 2018

Songs from the Village is the second studio album by Jess & Matt. The album features 12 classic songs that defined a generation in the 1960s in Greenwich Village, New York.

Matt Price said: "It's 50, almost 60 years later, and these songs are just as influential as ever, and a lot of the messages – in songs like "The Times They Are a-Changin" – calling for equality, in this modern world it feels more relevant than ever. It was interesting coming back to those songs and seeing how they stood the test of time, and that the messages have come back around."

The album was announced on 14 November 2017 alongside the album's pre-order and the announcement of a national tour with Rick Price and Jack Jones.

== Reception ==
Professional ratings
Review scores
Source	Rating
auspOp	3/5 stars

David from auspOp said; "Most songs on this collection sit in the “classics” category... [and] to take them on is a challenge in itself, but to do so well is the other half of the battle." adding "Jess & Matt to do a really good job." David said "Matt's vocals dominate the majority of songs but it relegates Jess almost to backing vocalist duties on several songs.". He called out "The Sound of Silence" as the album highlight.

== Track listing ==
No.	Title	Writer(s)	Length
1.	"The Times They Are A-Changin'" (Bob Dylan song)	Bob Dylan	3:50
2.	"The Boxer" (Simon & Garfunkel song)	Paul Simon; Art Garfunkel	3:59
3.	"Blowin' in the Wind" (Bob Dylan song)	Bob Dylan	2:54
4.	"Mrs. Robinson" (Simon & Garfunkel song)	Paul Simon	3:53
5.	"The Sound of Silence" (featuring Chris Isaak) (Simon & Garfunkel song)	Paul Simon	3:11
6.	"Don't Think Twice, It's All Right" (Bob Dylan song)	Bob Dylan	3:42
7.	"Scarborough Fair" (Simon & Garfunkel song)	Traditional; Paul Simon; Art Garfunkel	3:15
8.	"Leaving on a Jet Plane" (Peter, Paul and Mary song)	John Denver	3:37
9.	"The House of the Rising Sun" (featuring Rick Price) (The Animals song)	Traditional	3:17
10.	"Like a Rolling Stone" (Bob Dylan song)	Bob Dylan	4:43
11.	"Both Sides Now" (Joni Mitchell song)	Joni Mitchell	3:49
12.	"If I Had a Hammer" (Peter, Paul and Mary song)	Pete Seeger; Lee Hays	3:49
13.	"The Times They Are A-Changin'" (Reprise) (Bob Dylan song)	Bob Dylan	0:33

== Charts ==
Chart (2018)	Peak position
Australian Albums (ARIA)	11

== Release history ==
Country	Date	Format	Label	Catalogue
Australia	15 June 2018	CD; digital download; streaming	Sony Music Australia	88985463282
