= Hurt Anymore =

Single by Samantha Jade and Cyrus
- Released: 4 November 2016
- Recorded: 2016
- Genre: Pop
- Length: 3:41
- Label: Sony
- Songwriter(s): Samantha Jade; Iain James; Jez Ashurst

Samantha Jade singles chronology
"Always" (2016)	"Hurt Anymore" (2016)	"Nothing Without You" (2017)

Cyrus singles chronology
"Keep Talking" (2016)	"Hurt Anymore" (2016)	"Anchor" (2017)

Music video
- "Hurt Anymore" on YouTube

"Hurt Anymore" is a song by Australian recording artists Samantha Jade and Cyrus, released as a single on 4 November 2016 through Sony Music Australia, The music video premiered on VEVO on November 29, 2016.

== Background and recording ==
"Hurt Anymore" was written and recorded in London, with Jade describing the song as "a sad song — it's about when you know you're not in love anymore and the relationship is ruining you so it's time to get out". The single's release was first announced on Jade's Facebook page on 28 October 2016 and was released on 4 November.

== Live performances ==
Jade and Cyrus performed the song live on the eighth season of The X Factor Australia on 14 November 2016.

They performed the song across New South Wales and Queensland throughout November.

== Charts ==
Chart (2016)	Peak position
Australia (ARIA)	45

== Release history ==
Country	Date	Format	Label	Catalogue
Australia	4 November 2016	Digital download	Sony Music Australia	
Australia	11 November 2016	CD	Sony Music Australia	88985391062
