= Alexa Curtis (singer) =

New Zealander Australian musician

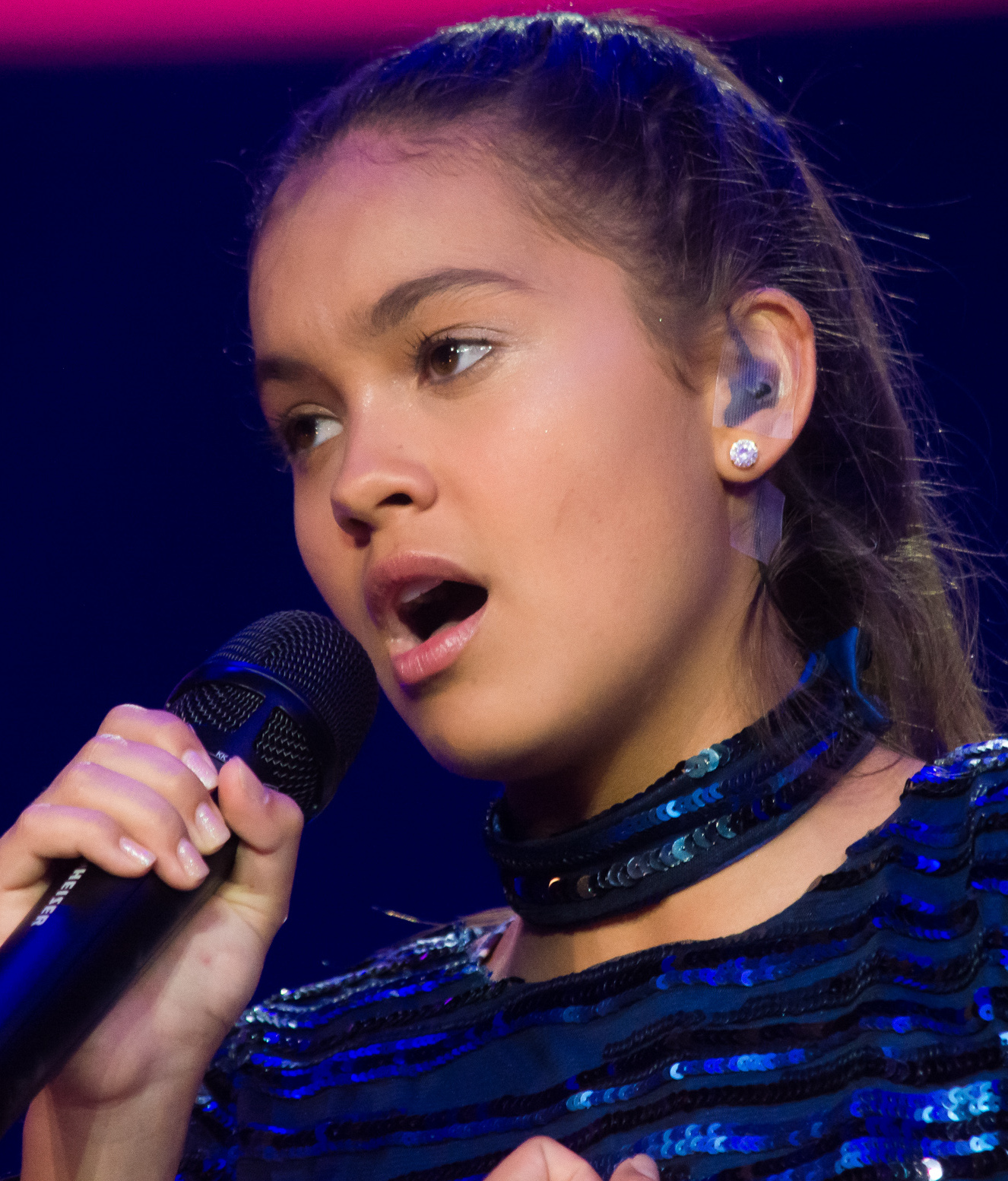
- Curtis at the Junior Eurovision Song Contest 2016

Background information
- Born: Alexa Nicole Curtis; 4 January 2004 (age 22); Gold Coast, Queensland, Australia
- Origin: Brisbane, Australia
- Genre: Pop
- Occupation: Singer
- Years active: 2014–present
- Label: Independent
- Website: www.alexacurtis.com

Alexa Nicole Curtis (born 4 January 2004), better known as Alexa Curtis, is an Australian singer, songwriter and actress. She won The Voice Kids Australia as part of Delta Goodrem's team in 2014, and subsequently signed with Universal Music Australia. Curtis represented Australia in the Junior Eurovision Song Contest 2016, where she placed fifth with 202 points.

== Early life ==
Curtis was born on 4 January 2004 to her New Zealand parents. She has an older brother, Aidan. Her family originally lived in Auckland, New Zealand, before relocating to Australia in 2006. She won The Voice Kids Australia in 2014 and was signed with Universal Music Australia.

== Career ==
=== Acting ===
In 2021, Alexa gained the lead role as Taylor Young in Rock Island Mysteries, a 20-part adventure/drama series which was shot on the Gold Coast, Queensland. A joint collaboration between Fremantle Australia and Nickelodeon. It premiered on 2 May 2022, on 10 Shake and 10 Play. It aired on Nickelodeon Australia and New Zealand from June 2022 and global audiences on Nickelodeon International later in the year. In 2019 Alexa played a supporting role as Jordan in the locally-shot movie Swimming for Silver.

=== Singing ===
In 2014, Alexa was a contestant on The Voice Kids. While all chairs turned, she chose Team Delta. She made it to the grand final where she won. Alexa appeared twice in the 2014 Schools Spectacular, first performing with her Voice Kids co-stars, then duetting with The Voice winner Anja Nissen. The same year she performed with a small group of The Voice Kids at Vision Australia's Carols by Candlelight. In 2015 and 2016 she performed as a featured artist at the Brisbane IGA Lord Mayor's Christmas Carols. In 2016 she sang the opening theme song for six episodes of The Powerpuff Girls on Cartoon Network Australia.

The Voice Kids performances and results (2014)
Episode	Song	Original Artist	Result
Audition	"Girl on Fire"	Alicia Keys	Through to Battle Rounds
Battle Rounds	"Stop"	Spice Girls	Through to Sing-Offs
Sing-Offs	"Girl on Fire"	Alicia Keys	Through to Grand Finale
Grand Finale Part 1	"Colors of the Wind"	Pocahontas	Advanced
Grand Finale Part 2	"Hero"	Mariah Carey	Winner

=== Junior Eurovision Song Contest ===
Alexa represented Australia in the Junior Eurovision Song Contest 2016.The song she sang was called "We Are". She finished in fifth place with 202 points.

=== Subsequent career ===
In 2020 Alexa released her first single "Overflow" with music and lyrics 100% owned by her. It was independently released.

== Discography ==
=== Singles ===
Title	Year	Album
"Playground"	2014	Non-album single
"We Are"	2016	Junior Eurovision Song Contest 2016
"Overflow"	2020	Non-album singles
"Dejavu"	2022	Non-album singles
"Cry"	2022	Non-album singles
"No Means No"	2024	Non-album singles
"On the Edge"	2025	Non-album singles
"Vanilla"	2025	Non-album singles
"The End."	2025	Non-album singles
"Ti Amo"	2026	Non-album singles

=== Guest appearances ===
Year	Song	Album
2014	"Colours of The Wind"	The Voice Kids 2014
2014	"Girl On Fire"	The Voice Kids 2014

Awards and achievements
Preceded by N/A	The Voice Kids winner 2014	Incumbent
Preceded by Bella Paige with "My Girls"	Australia in the Junior Eurovision Song Contest; 2016	Succeeded by Isabella Clarke with "Speak Up"
