= Bobby Andonov =

Australian singer (born 1994)

Bobi Andonov Боби Андонов
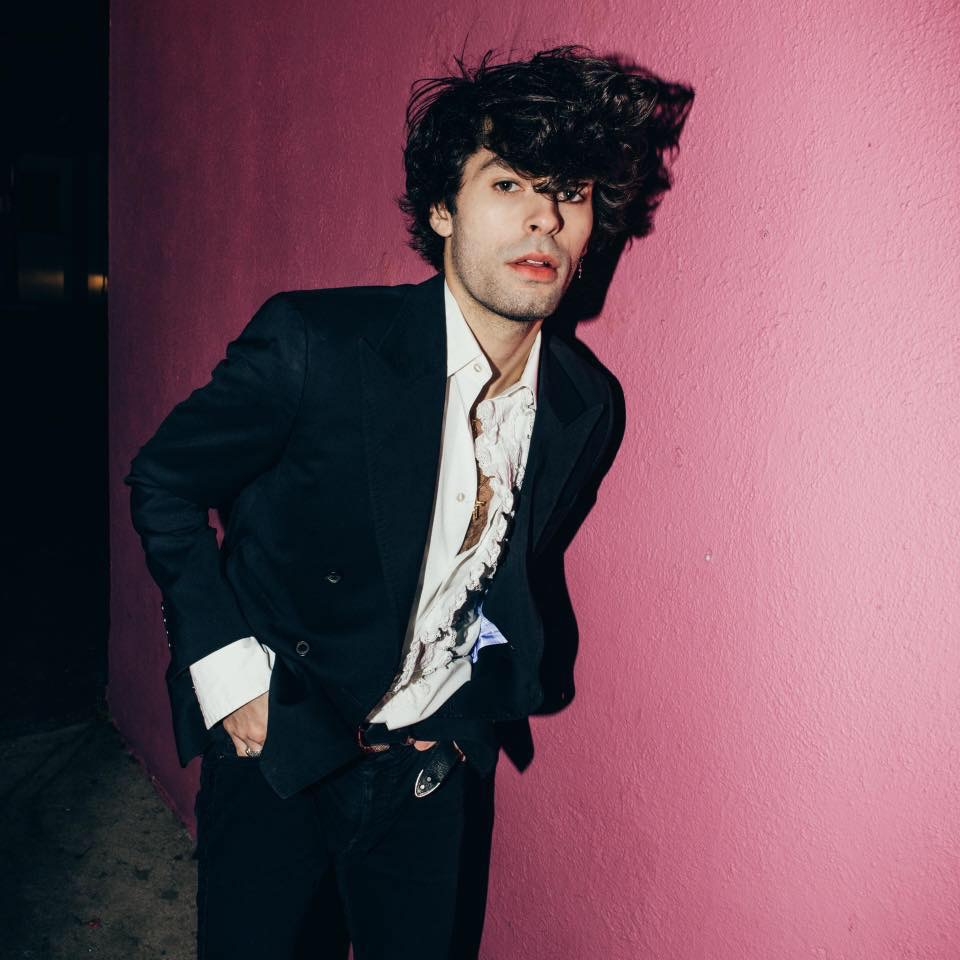

Background information
- Also known as: BOBI, Bobi Andonov, Bobby Andonov
- Born: Bobby Andonov; 28 August 1994 (age 32); Melbourne, Victoria, Australia
- Genres: Alternative; pop; soul
- Occupations: Singer; songwriter; musician; producer
- Instruments: Vocals; piano; guitar
- Years active: 2003–present
- Labels: Hollywood Records; Warner Music Australia
- Website: www.bobiandonov.com

Bobby Andonov (born 28 August 1994), known by his stage name Bobi Andonov, is an Australian, Macedonian singer, songwriter and producer.

== Early life ==
Bobby Andonov was born on 28 August 1994 in Melbourne, Victoria to parents originating from Strumica. He has performed since the age of 6, when he started dancing and singing in his hometown of Melbourne. At the age of 9, he starred as Danny Zuko in a junior production of Grease the musical. He was then selected to be one of four young Simba's in the Broadway production of The Lion King in Melbourne and Shanghai, China.

== Music career ==
At the age of 14, Andonov represented North Macedonia at the Junior Eurovision Song Contest 2008 in Cyprus. Out of 15 countries, he came in fifth with his song "Prati Mi SMS", which led to a European tour around the Balkans. In 2010 Andonov entered for Australia's Got Talent. His audition reached over 15 million views. He was a grand finalist on the show, performing covers of songs including Leonard Cohen's "Hallelujah" and Kanye West's "Heartless". In 2010, record producer and music critic Molly Meldrum flew Andonov to Sydney to meet R&B singer Usher.

In early 2014, Andonov wrote two songs for the Australian feature film The Dream Children, directed by Robert Chuter. He also worked on Afrojack's 2014 debut album Forget the World, co-writing the track "Born to Run", which features Tyler Glenn of Neon Trees on vocals. Andonov co-wrote and co-produced the 2015 single "Stone", recorded by The X Factor Australia winner Cyrus Villanueva.

In November 2015, Andonov signed a deal with Hollywood Records and moved to Los Angeles, where he currently resides. On 20 October 2017, he released his debut single "Apartment", along with a music video for the song. In 2021, Bobi signed a licensing deal with Warner Music Australia and released two EPs: In Bad Company and Saint, both of which received praise from outlets such as Rolling Stone Australia and Flaunt Magazine. His single “Bad Decisions", from In Bad Company, was featured in the Netflix film After Everything.

As of 2025, Bobi is fully independent. He continues to write and produce for other artists and is currently working on his debut full-length album. In the same year, he also launched his fashion brand, Auto Sportivo Official.

== Discography ==
=== Extended plays ===
List of EPs, with selected details
Title	Details
In Bad Company	Released: 4 August 2023; Label: KIDBRTHR / Warner Music Australia
Saint	Released: 9 May 2024; Label: KIDBRTHR / Warner Music Australia

=== Singles ===
List of singles, with selected details
Title	Year	EP	
"Apartment"	2017		
"Faithful"	2018		
"Smoke"	2018		
"Until the Morning"	2022		
"Night Crawls"	2022		
"Bad Decisions"	2023	In Bad Company	
"Potential"	2023	In Bad Company	
"Anymore"	2023	2024	Saint

=== Production and writing credits ===
Year	Artist	Album	Song	Credit	Peak chart positions
Year	Artist	Album	Song	Credit	AUS
2014	Afrojack feat. Tyler Glenn	Forget the World	"Born to Run"	Co-writer	
2015	Joel Fletcher		"State of Emergency"	Co-writer	10
2015	Cyrus Villanueva	Cyrus	"Stone"	Co-writer, co-producer	4

== See also ==
- Music of Australia

Awards and achievements
Preceded by Rosica Kulakova and Dimitar Stojmenovski with "Ding Ding Dong"	North Macedonia in the Junior Eurovision Song Contest; 2008	Succeeded by Sara Markoska with "Za ljubovta"
