= Stone (Cyrus song) =

Single by Cyrus

from the album Cyrus
- Released: 24 November 2015
- Recorded: 2015
- Genre: Pop
- Length: 3:32
- Label: Sony
- Songwriters: Peter Kelleher; Ben Kohn; Tom Barnes; Sean Douglas; Bobby Andonov

Cyrus singles chronology
"Stone" (2015)	"Keep Talking" (2016)

Music video
- "Stone" on YouTube

"Stone" is the debut and winner's single by Cyrus, the series seven winner of The X Factor Australia. It was released digitally on 24 November 2015 as the lead single from his self-titled debut album. The song debuted at number four on the ARIA Singles Chart. The music video was released on 12 December 2015.

== Background and release ==
"Stone" was written by TMS and Bobby Andonov. After winning The X Factor, "Stone" was released for digital download in Australia on 24 November 2015, as Cyrus's debut and winner's single. The song was released as a CD single three days later.

For the issue dated 30 November 2015, "Stone" debuted at number four on the ARIA Singles Chart from two days of sales.

== Live performances ==
Cyrus performed "Stone" live for the first time during The X Factor grand final performance show on 23 November 2015. He performed the song again during the grand final decider show the following day, after he was announced as the winner, where he told the audience; "I want to thank God for blessing me with the gift of music that I've been so blessed to share with you all."

== Charts ==
Chart (2015)	Peak position
Australia (ARIA)	4

== Certifications ==
Region	Certification	Certified units/sales
Australia (ARIA)	Gold	35,000^{‡}
^{‡} Sales+streaming figures based on certification alone.

== Release history ==
Country	Date	Format	Label
Australia	24 November 2015	Digital download	Sony Music Australia
Australia	27 November 2015	CD	Sony Music Australia
