= In Stereo (band) =

Australian boy band

- Origin: Sydney, New South Wales, Australia
- Genres: Pop
- Years active: 2015–2018
- Label: Independent
- Past members: Chris Lanzon; Jakob Delgado; Ethan Karpathy
- Website: www.instereoofficial.com

In Stereo was an Australian music group consisting of singer/songwriters Jakob Delgado, Chris Lanzon and Ethan Karpathy. The group were active from 2015 to 2018.

In 2015, In Stereo auditioned for season seven of The X Factor Australia singing "Style" by Taylor Swift. They made it to the top 12 and were mentored by Guy Sebastian. They were eliminated on 20 October. Shortly after they were eliminated, they started a mini web series known as the In Stereo Show which was uploaded to Facebook every Monday.

Karpathy left the group in December 2017 and Lanzon and Delgado announced the end of In Stereo in April 2018. Over four years, In Stereo released three EPs and four singles.

== 2015: The X Factor ==
denotes having been in the bottom two.

The X Factor performances and results (2015)
Episode	Song	Original Artist	Result
Audition	"Style"	Taylor Swift	Through to bootcamp
Bootcamp	"Steal My Girl"	One Direction	Through to super home visits
Super home visits	"Shut Up and Dance"	Walk the Moon	Through to live shows
Live show 1	"King"	Years & Years	Safe
Live show 2	"My Life Would Suck Without You"	Kelly Clarkson	Safe
Live show 3	"Photograph"	Ed Sheeran	Safe
Live show 4	"Demons"	Imagine Dragons	Bottom two
Live show 4 Showdown	"Hey There Delilah"	Plain White T's	Eliminated

== 2016—2018: Post X Factor ==
In April 2016, they released their debut EP She's Rock n Roll, it peaked at number 11 on ARIA Charts.

In Stereo toured Australia in April 2016 for the 'Honest' tour. In July, they released their second EP The Speed of Sound which peaked at number 3 on ARIA Charts.

On 9 December 2016, In Stereo released their single "Girlfriend".

On 7 July 2017, In Stereo released their third EP Day In, Day Out which peaked at number 1 on the Australian Pop Charts, doing an EP launch show shortly after the release on 10 July at Oxford Art Factory in Sydney. In Stereo toured Australia in September 2017 for the 'Day In Day Out' tour.

On 27 December 2017, Ethan Karpathy announced his departure from the band via his Instagram and Facebook accounts.

On 12 January 2018 In Stereo released "Cruel", their first single as a duo. The duo changed the styling of their name from In Stereo to instereo and received new artist pages of music streaming platforms. On 3 April 2018, the two officially announced on social media that they had split and gone different ways. Delgado said “After four years of unforgettable experiences, thousands of kilometres travelled and all the awesome shows we played, we have decided to end In Stereo”, adding “I would like to thank everyone who has supported In Stereo throughout the years. I’ll never forget this for as long as I live.” Delgado also implied that he would be releasing his own project in the near future.

== Musical style ==
AllMusic described In Stereo's application of the pop-punk style as "brash". The site said the band's debut album "emphasized the sweetness before that hyphen."

== Discography ==
=== Extended plays ===
Title	Details	Peak chart positions
Title	Details	AUS
She's Rock n Roll	Released: 1 April 2016; Label: Warner Music Australia; Formats: CD, digital download	11
The Speed of Sound	Released: 1 July 2016; Label: Warner Music Australia; Formats: CD, digital download	3
Day In, Day Out	Released: 7 July 2017; Label: In Stereo Records; Formats: Digital download	-

=== Singles ===
Year	Title	Peak chart positions	Album
Year	Title	AUS	Album
2016	"Honest" (with James Yammouni)	51	She's Rock n Roll
2016	"Girlfriend"	—	Non-album single
2017	"Bad for Me"	—	Day In, Day Out
2018	"Cruel"	—	Non-album single
