= Nothing Matters (Jess & Matt song) =

Single by Jess & Matt

from the album Jess & Matt
- Released: 30 November 2015
- Recorded: November 2015
- Genre: Pop
- Length: 3:02
- Label: Sony Music Australia
- Songwriter(s): Anthony Egizii; David Musumeci; Adam Argyle
- Producer(s): DNA Songs

Jess & Matt singles chronology
"Nothing Matters" (2015)	"Bones" (2016)

"Nothing Matters" is the debut single by Jess & Matt, the series seven third place-getters of The X Factor Australia. "Nothing Matters" was written by Anthony Egizii and David Musumeci of DNA Songs and Adam Argyle and would've been the duo's winning single. The song debuted at number 29 on the ARIA Singles Chart.

== Track listing ==
- Digital download
1. "Nothing Matters" – 3:02

== Charts ==
Chart (2015)	Peak position
Australia (ARIA)	29

== Release history ==
Country	Date	Format	Label
Australia	30 November 2015	Digital download	Sony Music Australia
