= Cyrus Villanueva =

Australian singer

- Born: 20 June 1996 (age 30); Galiwin'ku, Northern Territory, Australia
- Origin: Wollongong, New South Wales, Australia
- Genre: Pop
- Occupation: Singer
- Instruments: Vocals; guitar; piano
- Years active: 2015–present
- Label: Sony (2015-2018)

Cyrus Villanueva (born 20 June 1996), also known mononymously as Cyrus, is an Australian singer from Wollongong, New South Wales. He is best known for winning the seventh season of The X Factor Australia in 2015. His debut studio album Cyrus was released on 9 December 2015.

== Career ==
=== 2015–2018: The X Factor and Cyrus ===
In 2015 Cyrus took part in the seventh season of The X Factor Australia. He was part of the 'Boys' category and was mentored by Chris Isaak. He made it through to the Grand Finale and won the show after singing "Wicked Game".

denotes a performance that entered the ARIA Singles
denotes winner

The X Factor performances and results (2015)
Episode	Song	Original Artist	Result
Audition	"Earned It"	The Weeknd	Through to bootcamp
Bootcamp	"Dancing On My Own"	Calum Scott	Through to super home visits
Super home visits	"Is This Love"	Bob Marley and the Wailers	Through to live shows
Live show 1	"Boyfriend"	Justin Bieber	Safe
Live show 2	"Wicked Game"	Chris Isaak	Safe
Live show 3	"Hold Back the River"	James Bay	Safe
Live show 4	"It Ain't Over 'til It's Over"	Lenny Kravitz	Safe
Live show 5	"Rumour Has It"	Adele	Safe
Live show 6	"Knockin' on Heaven's Door"	Guns N' Roses	Safe
Live show 7	"Love Me like You Do"	Ellie Goulding	Safe
Live show 8	"Don't"	Ed Sheeran	Safe
Live show 8	"In the Air Tonight"	Phil Collins	Safe
Grand Final	"Earned It"	The Weekend	Winner
Grand Final	"Stone"	Villanueva	Winner
Grand Final	"Jealous"	Labrinth	Winner
Grand Final	"Wicked Game"	Chris Isaak	Winner

After winning the competition Villanueva received a recording contract with Sony Music Australia and released his debut single "Stone" co-produced by TMS and Bobby Andonov and co-written by TMS, Bobby Andonov and Sean Douglas. Villanueva's self-titled debut album Cyrus was released on 9 December 2015, and features studio recordings of selected songs he performed on The X Factor.

Between 2016 and 2018, Villanueva released five singles with Sony Music, before leaving the company following "Blah", released in September 2018.

=== 2019–present: Independent artist and Had, Lost ===
In July 2020, Cyrus released "I'm Sorry", his first single as an independent artist.

On 5 November 2021, Cyrus released the EP Had, Lost. Of the EP, Cyrus said: "I see this EP as a new refreshed, refined project. It’s the first batch of music that I'm releasing that I've fully written and produced. I'm just so much more self-aware now both personally and creatively — [Previously], I was thrown into the deep end and a lot happened quicker than I realised. I just sat in the passenger seat, whereas now everything I do is deliberate and much more thought out".

== Personal life ==
Villanueva is of paternal Filipino and maternal Australian descent and comes from a musical family; his father is a retired professional entertainer. His father, Isagani Villanueva, is from Cotabato City, Philippines, and his mother, Tracie Villanueva, is Australian. Cyrus was inspired to sing by his father who is a professional singer. Prior to entering The X Factor, Villanueva was studying graphic design at the University of Wollongong and performing gigs in bars, cafés and at weddings during his spare time. Aside from singing, he also plays the guitar and piano.

== Discography ==
=== Studio albums ===
List of studio albums, with selected details, chart positions and certifications
Title	Details	Peak chart positions	Certifications
Title	Details	AUS	Certifications
Cyrus	Released: 9 December 2015; Label: Sony Music Australia; Formats: CD, digital download	9	ARIA: Gold

=== Extended plays ===
List of EPs, with selected details
Title	Details
Had, Lost	Released: 5 November 2021; Label: Cyrus; Formats: Streaming, digital download
The Lost Files [2002-2005]	Released: September 2024; Label: GD4YA; Formats: streaming, digital download

=== Singles ===
List of singles, with selected chart positions and certifications
Year	Title	Peak chart positions	Certifications	Album
Year	Title	AUS	Certifications	Album
2015	"Stone"	4	ARIA: Gold	Cyrus
2016	"Keep Talking"	44		Non-album singles
2016	"Hurt Anymore" (with Samantha Jade)	45		Non-album singles
2017	"Anchor" (Baytek featuring Cyrus)	—		Non-album singles
2017	"Alone"	—		Non-album singles
2017	"Don't Let Me Know"	—		Non-album singles
2018	"Blah"	—		Non-album singles
2020	"I'm Sorry"	—		Non-album singles
2021	"Facts"	—		Had, Lost
2021	"Love Online"	—		Had, Lost
2024	"Landline"	—		
2025	"At the End of the Day"	—		
2025	"Pretty"	—		
2025	"Never Say Goodbye"	—		

=== Other charted songs ===
List of other charted songs, with selected chart positions
Year	Title	Peak chart positions
Year	Title	AUS
2015	"Wicked Game"	6
2015	"Hold Back the River"	100
2015	"Rumour Has It"	109
2015	"Knockin' on Heaven's Door"	80
2015	"In the Air Tonight"	71
2015	"Jealous"	81

== Awards and nominations ==
=== Vanda & Young Global Songwriting Competition ===
The Vanda & Young Global Songwriting Competition is an annual competition that "acknowledges great songwriting whilst supporting and raising money for Nordoff-Robbins" and is coordinated by Albert Music and APRA AMCOS. It commenced in 2009.

Year	Nominee / work	Award	Result	Ref.
2025	"At the End of the Day"	Vanda & Young Global Songwriting Competition	Finalist	

Awards and achievements
Preceded by Marlisa Punzalan	The X Factor Australia; Winner; 2015	Succeeded by Isaiah Firebrace
