= The X Factor (Australian TV series) season 7 =

The X Factor
- Season 7
- Hosted by: Luke Jacobz
- Judges: Dannii Minogue; Guy Sebastian; Chris Isaak; James Blunt
- Winner: Cyrus Villanueva
- Winning mentor: Chris Isaak
- Runner-up: Louise Adams

Release
- Original network: Seven Network
- Original release: 13 September – 24 November 2015

Season chronology
- ← Previous; Season 6 Next → Season 8

The X Factor was an Australian television reality music competition, based on the original UK series, to find new singing talent; the winner of which received a Sony Music Australia recording contract. The seventh season premiered on the Seven Network on 13 September 2015 and concluded on 24 November 2015. Luke Jacobz returned as the host of the show. Dannii Minogue was the only judge from the previous season who returned, while Redfoo, Ronan Keating and Natalie Bassingthwaighte were replaced by former judge Guy Sebastian, as well as new judges James Blunt and Chris Isaak. The winner was Cyrus Villanueva and his winner's single "Stone" was released after the final. He was mentored by Isaak, who won as mentor for the first time.

Open auditions in front of the show's producers took place in 13 cities between January and March 2015. The successful auditionees chosen by the producers were then invited back to the last set of auditions that took place in front of the judges and a live audience in June 2015. The next round was bootcamp, which for the first time on The X Factor Australia incorporated the five seat challenge, where each act performed in front of the judges and a live audience to earn a place on one of the five seats in their category. Following bootcamp was the super home visits round in London, where each judge reduced their five acts to three, with help from guest mentors Simon Cowell, Olly Murs and Rita Ora. For the first time on The X Factor Australia, instead of travelling to four different locations around the world, the super home visits for each category were all held together in the same location.

The live shows began on 27 September 2015. They returned to Monday and Tuesday nights as previously seen in seasons 3 and 4. This was a change of format from seasons 2, 5 and 6, in which the live shows were broadcast on Sunday and Monday nights.

== Judges and host ==
Judges and Host for The X Factor Season 7

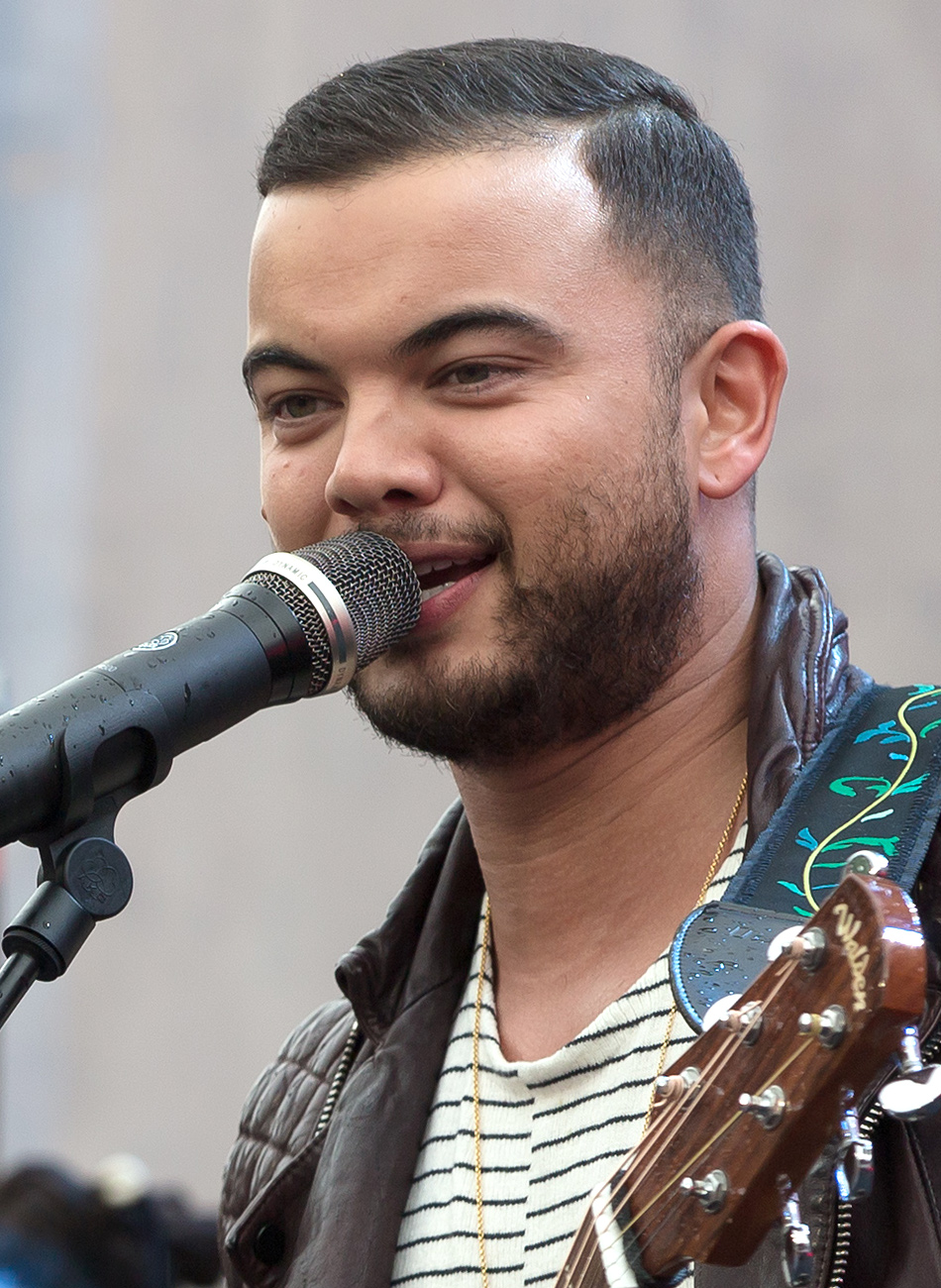
Guy Sebastian

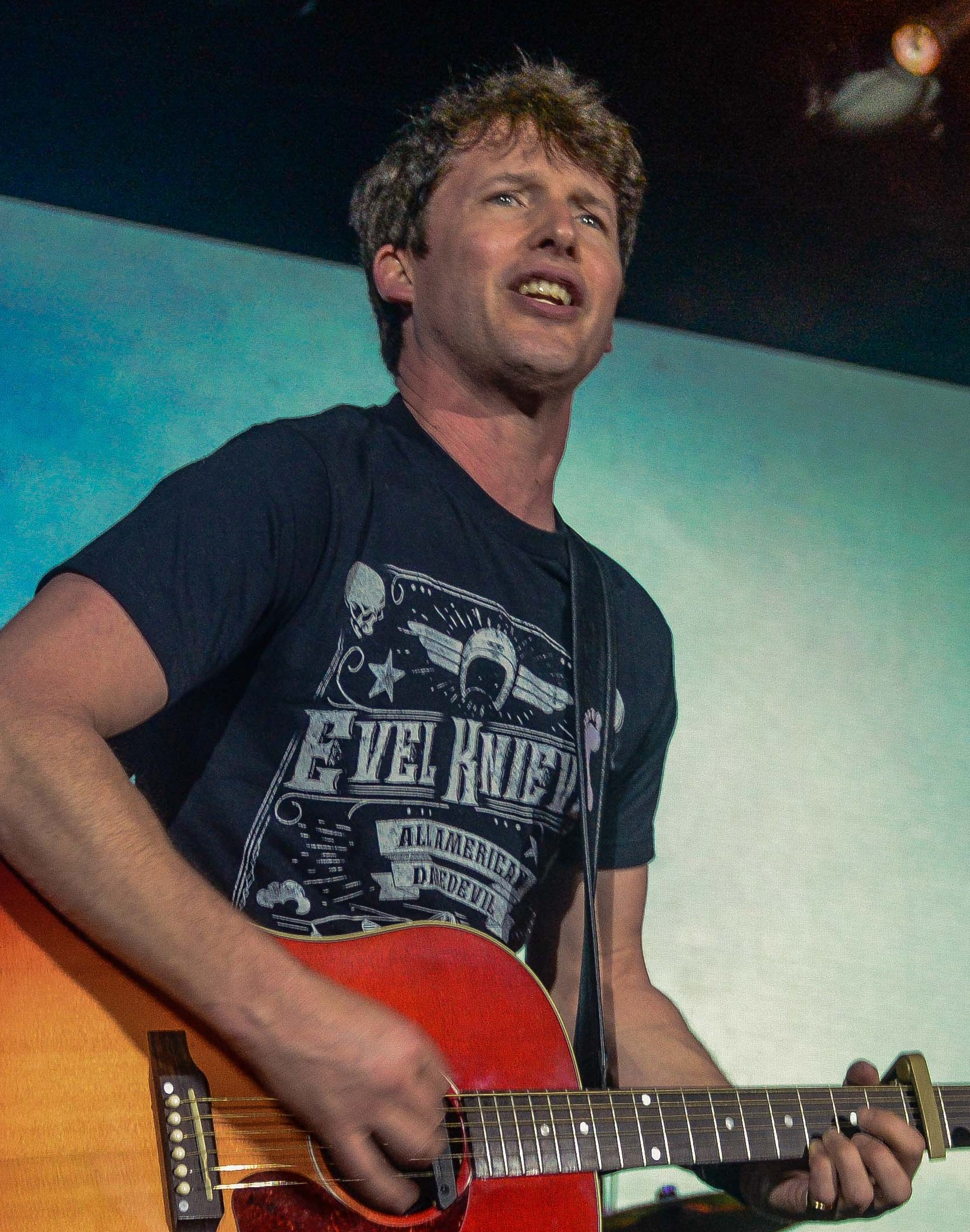
James Blunt

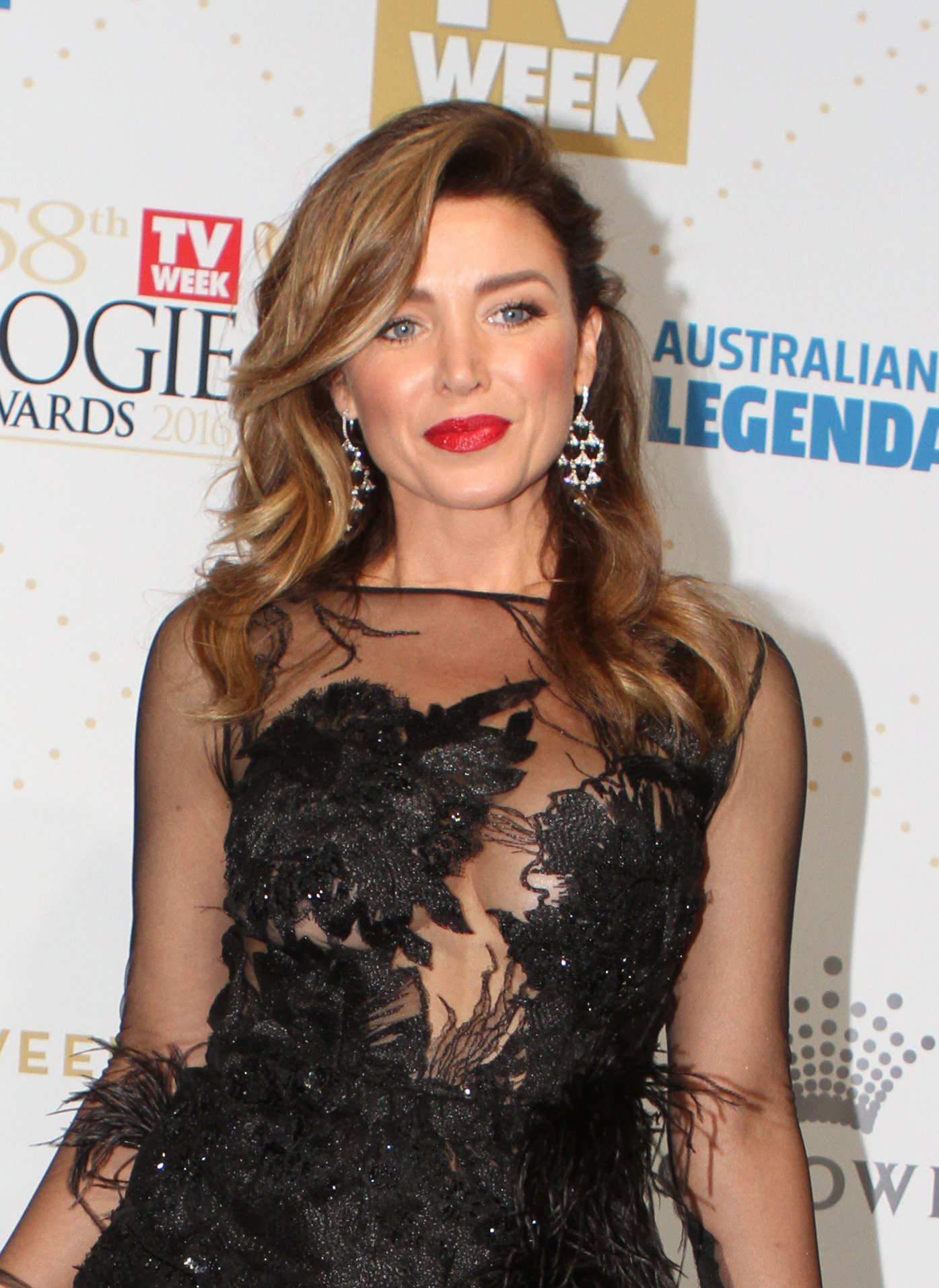
Dannii Minogue

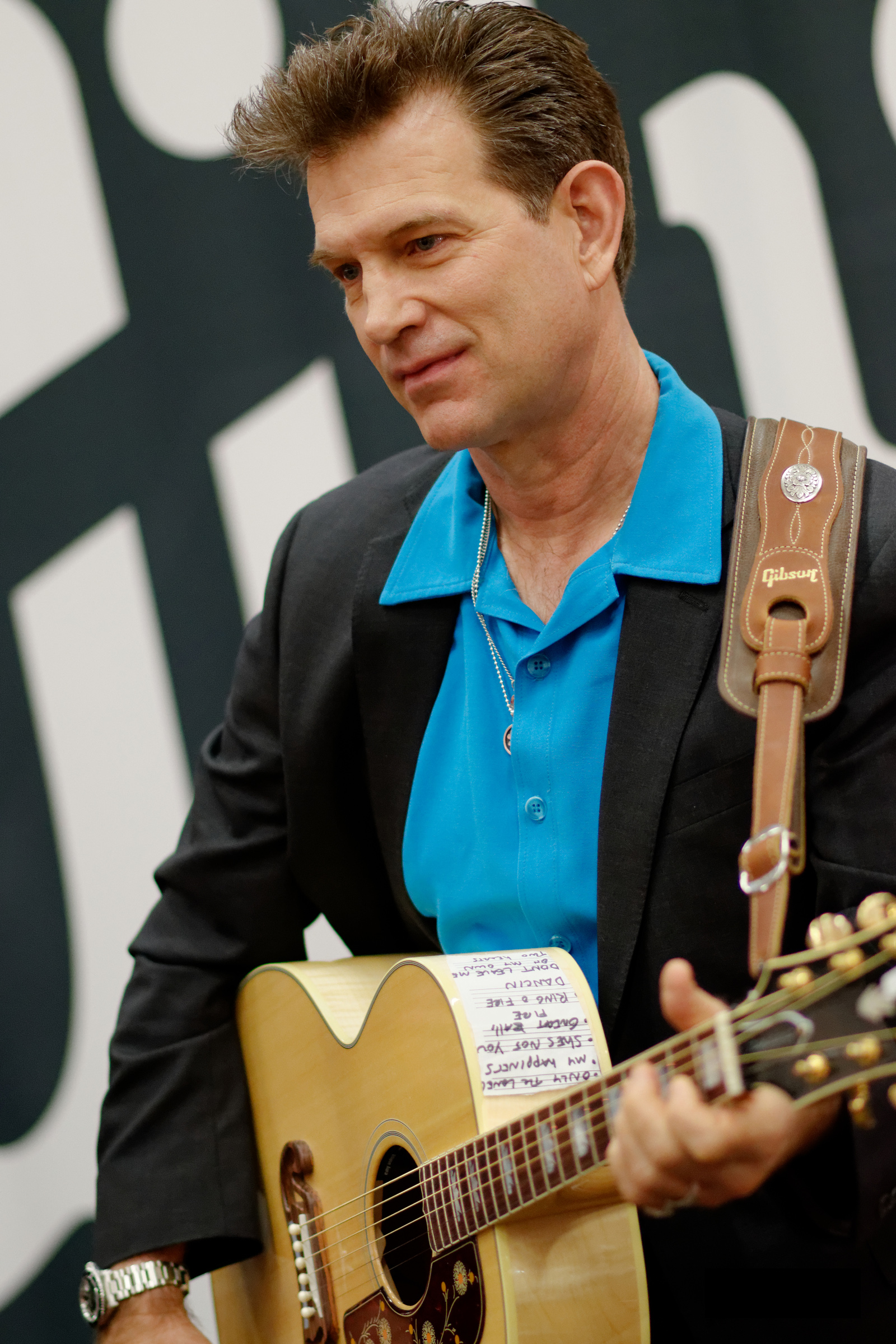
Chris Isaak

On 25 April 2015, Ronan Keating confirmed in an interview with The Sunday Telegraph that he would not be returning for season 7 as he wanted to focus on his music career. He said, "I've had five great years working on an amazing show with a brilliant team of people. But I'm working on a new solo album and different projects so I can't make it back this year sadly." Natalie Bassingthwaighte announced her departure on her Twitter account on 29 April 2015. On 1 May 2015, Redfoo announced on his Facebook page that he would also not be returning as he wanted to focus on other projects including a new album. Dannii Minogue was the only judge from season 6 who returned.

On 3 May 2015, it was confirmed that Guy Sebastian would be returning to the judging panel, after a two-year absence, as Redfoo's replacement, while James Blunt and Chris Isaak would be replacing Keating and Bassingthwaighte. Isaak said, "It is going to be surreal to be on the show as a judge after having watched so many episodes as a fan. I know it's a show with a history of articulate, intelligent judges, and I know they wanted to change that up so they called me." Blunt previously appeared on season 6 as a guest mentor for Minogue's Groups category during the home visits round.

== Selection process ==
=== Auditions ===
Open auditions in front of the show's producers took place in 13 cities and ran from 31 January 2015 to 10 March 2015. Online auditions were also held for those who could not attend the open auditions. The auditionees chosen by the producers were then invited back to the last set of auditions that took place in front of the judges and a live studio audience. These auditions were filmed at the Qantas Credit Union Arena in Sydney on 4, 5, 6 and 7 June 2015 and Hisense Arena in Melbourne on 12, 13 and 14 June 2015.

Open auditions
City	Dates	Venue
Sydney	31 January–2 February 2015	Sydney Cricket Ground
Byron Bay	5 February 2015	Byron Entertainment Centre
Brisbane	7–8 February 2015	Sofitel Brisbane
Townsville	10 February 2015	Townsville Entertainment and Convention Centre
Rockhampton	12 February 2015	Pilbeam Theatre
Melbourne	14–16 February 2015	Moonee Valley Racing Club
Perth	21–22 February 2015	Perth Convention and Exhibition Centre
Geraldton	24 February 2015	Ocean Centre Hotel
Adelaide	27 February 2015	AAMI Stadium Function Complex
Mildura	2 March 2015	Mildura Arts Centre
Albury	4 March 2015	Albury Entertainment Centre
Canberra	6 March 2015	QT Canberra
Newcastle	10 March 2015	Hunter Stadium

Judges' auditions
City	Dates	Venue
Sydney	4–7 June 2015	Qantas Credit Union Arena
Melbourne	12–14 June 2015	Hisense Arena

=== Bootcamp and five seat challenge ===
The bootcamp round of the competition was held at the Sydney Olympic Park. Filming began on 8 July 2015. The episodes with a live audience were filmed on 10 and 11 July 2015. Before bootcamp started, the judges cut half of the 100 successful acts from auditions and only 48 acts remained (12 in each category). At the beginning of the bootcamp round, each judge found out which category they would be mentoring. Isaak was given the Boys, Blunt was given the Over 25s, Sebastian was given the Groups and Minogue was given the Girls. For the first time on The X Factor Australia, bootcamp incorporated the five seat challenge, where each act performed in front of the judges and a live audience to earn a place on one of the five seats in their category. After each performance, the mentor for that category decided if that act deserved to take a seat as one of their top five to go through to the super home visits.

If all five seats were filled for each category and a remaining act performed better than those seated, the mentor for that category had the option of swapping an act out. Contestants Panda and Chan were swapped for Cyrus Villanueva and Big T in the Boys category, Aaron Taylor and Mama Julz were swapped for Roshani Priddis and Dan Hamill in the Over 25s category, and couple duo Luke & Tannah were swapped for Lazy J & Big Guy in the Groups category. In the Girls category, Carla Wehbe and Chloe Papandrea were swapped for Maddison Milewski and Shannon Hancock. However, Hancock was then swapped for Michaela Baranov.

The 20 successful acts were:

- Boys: Big T, Jimmy Davis, Michael Duchesne, Andrew Lambrou, Cyrus Villanueva
- Girls: Michaela Baranov, Georgia Denton, Emilia Kelberg, Maddison Milewski, Mahalia Simpson
- Over 25s: Louise Adams, Natalie Conway, Gazele, Dan Hamill, Roshani Priddis
- Groups: The Fisher Boys, In Stereo, Jess & Matt, Lazy J & Big Guy, Paris Inc.

=== Super home visits ===
For the first time on The X Factor Australia, instead of travelling to four different locations around the world, the super home visits for each category were all held together in the same location. The first episode of the super home visits round was filmed in London on 25 July 2015. Each act performed one song to their mentor and guest mentors. Minogue and Sebastian were assisted by Simon Cowell and Olly Murs, and Isaak and Blunt were assisted by Cowell and Rita Ora. After the performances, the judges along with their guest mentors narrowed down the acts to three each. The Girls and Groups categories travelled to Abu Dhabi to find out which of their acts made it to the live shows, while the Boys and Over 25s categories remained in London.

Summary of home visits
Judge	Category	Location(s)	Assistant(s)	Contestants eliminated
Isaak	Boys	London	Simon Cowell; Rita Ora	Michael Duchesne, Andrew Lambrou
Blunt	Over 25s	London	Simon Cowell; Rita Ora	Gazele, Roshani Priddis
Minogue	Girls	London and Abu Dhabi	Simon Cowell; Olly Murs	Emilia Kelberg, Maddison Milewski
Sebastian	Groups	London and Abu Dhabi	Simon Cowell; Olly Murs	Lazy J & Big Guy, Paris Inc.

== Acts ==
Key:

– Winner
– Runner-Up

Act	Age(s)	Hometown	Category (mentor)	Result
Cyrus Villanueva	19	Wollongong	Boys (Isaak)	Winner
Louise Adams	31	Mount Gambier	Over 25s (Blunt)	Runner-Up
Jess & Matt	24	Chipping Norton	Groups (Sebastian)	3rd Place
Big T	22	New Zealand/Perth	Boys (Isaak)	4th Place
Mahalia Simpson	23	New Zealand/Brisbane, Queensland	Girls (Minogue)	5th Place
Natalie Conway	33	Sydney	Over 25s (Blunt)	6th Place
Michaela Baranov	24	Pennant Hills	Girls (Minogue)	7th Place
In Stereo	14–15	Various	Groups (Sebastian)	8th Place
Jimmy Davis	21	Gympie	Boys (Isaak)	9th Place
Georgia Denton	14	London, England/Melbourne	Girls (Minogue)	10th Place
The Fisher Boys	17–23	Perth	Groups (Sebastian)	11th Place
Dan Hamill	30	Perth	Over 25s (Blunt)	12th Place

== Live shows ==
=== Results summary ===
Colour key

Act in Team Dannii
Act in Team Guy
Act in Team Chris
Act in Team James

– Act in the bottom two and had to perform again in the final showdown
– Act was in the bottom three but received the fewest votes and was immediately eliminated
– Act received the fewest public votes and was immediately eliminated (no final showdown)

Weekly results per act
Act	Week 1	Week 2	Week 3	Week 4	Week 5	Week 6	Quarter-Final	Semi-Final	Final	
Act	Week 1	Week 2	Week 3	Week 4	Week 5	Week 6	Quarter-Final	Semi-Final	Monday Vote	Tuesday Vote
Cyrus Villanueva	Safe	Safe	Safe	Safe	Safe	Safe	Safe	Safe	Safe	Winner
Louise Adams	Safe	Safe	Safe	Safe	Safe	Safe	Safe	3rd	Safe	Runner-Up
Jess & Matt	Safe	Bottom Two	Safe	Bottom Two	Safe	Safe	Safe	Safe	3rd	Eliminated (Final)
Big T	Safe	Safe	Safe	Safe	Safe	Safe	4th	4th	Eliminated (Semi-Final)	
Mahalia Simpson	Safe	Safe	Bottom Three	Safe	Bottom Two	5th	5th	Eliminated (Quarter-Final)		
Natalie Conway	Safe	Safe	Safe	Safe	Safe	6th	Eliminated (Week 6)			
Michaela Baranov	Safe	Safe	Safe	Safe	Bottom Two	Eliminated (Week 5)				
In Stereo	Safe	Safe	Safe	Bottom Two	Eliminated (Week 4)					
Jimmy Davis	Safe	Safe	Bottom Three	Eliminated (Week 3)						
Georgia Denton	Bottom Two	Safe	10th	Eliminated (Week 3)						
The Fisher Boys	Safe	Bottom Two	Eliminated (Week 2)							
Dan Hamill	Bottom Two	Eliminated (Week 1)								
Final Showdown	Hamill, Denton	The Fisher Boys, Jess and Matt	Simpson, Davis	In Stereo, Jess and Matt	Simpson, Baranov	Simpson, Conway	Simpson, Big T	Big T, Adams	No final showdown/judges' vote; public votes alone decide who wins	
Judges voted to	Eliminate							Send Through	No final showdown/judges' vote; public votes alone decide who wins	
Blunt's vote (Over 25s)	Denton	The Fisher Boys	Davis	In Stereo	Baranov	Simpson	Simpson	Adams	No final showdown/judges' vote; public votes alone decide who wins	
Isaak's vote (Boys)	Hamill	The Fisher Boys	Simpson	In Stereo	Baranov	Conway	Simpson	Big T	No final showdown/judges' vote; public votes alone decide who wins	
Sebastian's vote (Groups)	Hamill	—N/a^{1}	Davis	—N/a^{1}	Baranov	Simpson	Big T	Adams	No final showdown/judges' vote; public votes alone decide who wins	
Minogue's vote (Girls)	Hamill	The Fisher Boys	Davis	In Stereo	Simpson	Conway	Big T	Big T	No final showdown/judges' vote; public votes alone decide who wins	
Eliminated	Dan Hamill; 3 of 4 votes Majority	The Fisher Boys; 3 of 3 votes Majority	Georgia Denton; Public Vote To Save	In Stereo; 3 of 3 votes Majority	Michaela Baranov; 3 of 4 votes Majority	Natalie Conway; 2 of 4 votes Deadlock	Mahalia Simpson; 2 of 4 votes Deadlock	Big T 2 of 4 votes Deadlock	Jess & Matt; Public Vote To Win	Louise Adams; Public Vote To Win
Eliminated	Dan Hamill; 3 of 4 votes Majority	The Fisher Boys; 3 of 3 votes Majority	Jimmy Davis; 3 of 4 votes Majority	In Stereo; 3 of 3 votes Majority	Michaela Baranov; 3 of 4 votes Majority	Natalie Conway; 2 of 4 votes Deadlock	Mahalia Simpson; 2 of 4 votes Deadlock	Big T 2 of 4 votes Deadlock	Jess & Matt; Public Vote To Win	Louise Adams; Public Vote To Win

^1 Sebastian was not required to vote as there was already a majority.

=== Live show details ===
==== Week 1 (27/29 September) ====
- Theme: Launch Party
- Group performance: "Gold Dust"
- Celebrity performers: Jessica Mauboy ("This Ain't Love") and Justin Bieber ("What Do You Mean?")

Acts' performances on the first live show
Act	Category (mentor)	Order	Song	Result
Georgia Denton	Girls (Minogue)	1	"Hold My Hand"	Bottom Two
The Fisher Boys	Groups (Sebastian)	2	"Can't Feel My Face"	Safe
Big T	Boys (Isaak)	3	"(I Can't Get No) Satisfaction"	Safe
Dan Hamill	Over 25s (Blunt)	4	"This Love"	Bottom Two
Jimmy Davis	Boys (Isaak)	5	"Long Train Runnin'"	Safe
Michaela Baranov	Girls (Minogue)	6	"Wildest Dreams"	Safe
Louise Adams	Over 25s (Blunt)	7	"Somebody to Love"	Safe
Jess & Matt	Groups (Sebastian)	8	"Heart of Glass"	Safe
Mahalia Simpson	Girls (Minogue)	9	"Is You Is or Is You Ain't My Baby"	Safe
In Stereo	Groups (Sebastian)	10	"King"	Safe
Cyrus Villanueva	Boys (Isaak)	11	"Boyfriend"	Safe
Natalie Conway	Over 25s (Blunt)	12	"Spectrum (Say My Name)"	Safe
Final showdown details
Act	Category (mentor)	Order	Song	Result
Dan Hamill	Over 25s (Blunt)	1	"Empire State of Mind (Part II) Broken Down"	Eliminated
Georgia Denton	Girls (Minogue)	2	"Ave Maria"	Safe

Judges' vote to eliminate

- Minogue: Dan Hamill – backed her own act, Georgia Denton.
- Blunt: Georgia Denton – backed his own act, Dan Hamill.
- Isaak: Dan Hamill – wanted to see what Denton was going to do next.
- Sebastian: Dan Hamill – thought Denton still had more to deliver.

Notes

- This week's live performance show aired on Sunday night due to the Seven Network's coverage of the 2015 Brownlow Medal on Monday night.

==== Week 2 (5/6 October) ====
- Theme: Decades Challenge
- Group performance: "Up"
- Celebrity performers:
  - Monday: One Direction ("Drag Me Down")
  - Tuesday: Ellie Goulding ("On My Mind") and Robbie Williams ("Angels")

Acts' performances on the second live show
Act	Category (mentor)	Order	Song	Decade	Result
The Fisher Boys	Groups (Sebastian)	1	"Beggin'"	2000s	Bottom Two
Michaela Baranov	Girls (Minogue)	2	"Holding Out for a Hero"	1980s	Safe
Louise Adams	Over 25s (Blunt)	3	"People Help the People"	2000s	Safe
Jimmy Davis	Boys (Isaak)	4	"Black or White"	1990s	Safe
Georgia Denton	Girls (Minogue)	5	"Listen to Your Heart"	1980s	Safe
In Stereo	Groups (Sebastian)	6	"My Life Would Suck Without You"	2000s	Safe
Mahalia Simpson	Girls (Minogue)	7	"Hello"	1980s	Safe
Jess & Matt	Groups (Sebastian)	8	"Ignition (Remix)"	2000s	Bottom Two
Cyrus Villanueva	Boys (Isaak)	9	"Wicked Game"	1990s	Safe
Natalie Conway	Over 25s (Blunt)	10	"Break Free"	2010s	Safe
Big T	Boys (Isaak)	11	"Don't Let the Sun Go Down on Me"	1990s	Safe
Final showdown details
Act	Category (mentor)	Order	Song		Result
The Fisher Boys	Groups (Sebastian)	1	"Use Somebody"		Eliminated
Jess & Matt	Groups (Sebastian)	2	"Fall at Your Feet"		Safe

Judges' vote to eliminate

- Minogue: The Fisher Boys – felt that Jess and Matt has develop more.
- Blunt: The Fisher Boys – felt that The Fisher Boys went too far that week.
- Isaak: The Fisher Boys – thought Jess & Matt had the X Factor.
- Sebastian was not required to vote as there was already a majority and did not say how he would have voted as both acts were in his category.

Notes

- A video of One Direction's performance of "Drag Me Down" from their On the Road Again Tour was shown on Monday night.
- On 17 October 2015, the performances of three contestants entered the ARIA Singles Chart. Cyrus Villanueva's performance of "Wicked Game" debuted at number 6, Mahalia Simpson's performance of "Hello" debuted at number 88, and Louise Adams' performance of "People Help the People" debuted at number 91.

==== Week 3 (12/13 October) ====
- Theme: Top 10 Hits
- Group performance: "Rather Be"
- Celebrity performers: Jess Glynne ("Don't Be So Hard on Yourself"), Chris Isaak ("Please Don't Call"), and Little Mix ("Love Me Like You")

Acts' performances on the third live show
Act	Category (mentor)	Order	Song	Result
Big T	Boys (Isaak)	1	"I'm Not the Only One"	Safe
Georgia Denton	Girls (Minogue)	2	"I'll Be There"	Eliminated
In Stereo	Groups (Sebastian)	3	"Photograph"	Safe
Mahalia Simpson	Girls (Minogue)	4	"Get Stupid"	Bottom Three
Jimmy Davis	Boys (Isaak)	5	"When You Were Young"	Bottom Three
Louise Adams	Over 25s (Blunt)	6	"Bang Bang (My Baby Shot Me Down)"	Safe
Michaela Baranov	Girls (Minogue)	7	"Murder on the Dancefloor"	Safe
Natalie Conway	Over 25s (Blunt)	8	"Wrecking Ball"	Safe
Jess & Matt	Groups (Sebastian)	9	"Do You Remember"	Safe
Cyrus Villanueva	Boys (Isaak)	10	"Hold Back the River"	Safe
Final showdown details
Act	Category (mentor)	Order	Song	Result
Mahalia Simpson	Girls (Minogue)	1	"Summertime"	Safe
Jimmy Davis	Boys (Isaak)	2	"Rocket Man"	Eliminated

Judges' vote to eliminate

- Isaak: Mahalia Simpson – backed his own act, Jimmy Davis.
- Minogue: Jimmy Davis – backed her own act, Mahalia Simpson.
- Blunt: Jimmy Davis – felt that Simpson was fantastic despite being a threat to the contestants in his category.
- Sebastian: Jimmy Davis – felt that Simpson had more magical performances in the live shows.

Notes

- For the first time in the show's history, this week's live decider featured a double elimination.
- For the second time in the show's history, this week's live decider featured a bottom three. However, one act was immediately eliminated while the other two faced off in the final showdown before the judges' votes as usual.
- On 24 October 2015, the performances of two contestants entered the ARIA Singles Chart. Jess & Matt's performance of "Do You Remember" debuted at number 53 and Cyrus Villanueva's performance of "Hold Back the River" debuted at number 100.

==== Week 4 (19/20 October) ====
- Theme: Rock
- Group performance: "Mickey" / "Shake It Off"
- Celebrity performers: Conrad Sewell ("Who You Lovin") and Adam Lambert ("Another Lonely Night")

Acts' performances on the fourth live show
Act	Category (mentor)	Order	Song	Rock Artist	Result
Big T	Boys (Isaak)	1	"Whole Lotta Love"	Led Zeppelin	Safe
Natalie Conway	Over 25s (Blunt)	2	"Alone"	Heart	Safe
Jess & Matt	Groups (Sebastian)	3	"Sweet Disposition"	The Temper Trap	Bottom Two
In Stereo	Groups (Sebastian)	4	"Demons"	Imagine Dragons	Bottom Two
Cyrus Villanueva	Boys (Isaak)	5	"It Ain't Over 'til It's Over"	Lenny Kravitz	Safe
Michaela Baranov	Girls (Minogue)	6	"Wild Horses"	The Rolling Stones	Safe
Mahalia Simpson	Girls (Minogue)	7	"Need You Tonight"	INXS	Safe
Louise Adams	Over 25s (Blunt)	8	"Dream On"	Aerosmith	Safe
Final showdown details
Act	Category (mentor)	Order	Song		Result
In Stereo	Groups (Sebastian)	1	"Hey There Delilah"		Eliminated
Jess & Matt	Groups (Sebastian)	2	"Thinking Out Loud"		Safe

Judges' vote to eliminate

- Blunt: In Stereo – complimented In Stereo's final showdown performance but felt it was "too little too late".
- Isaak: In Stereo – gave no reason, although stated that the final showdown performances were close.
- Minogue: In Stereo – felt In Stereo were worse that week.
- Sebastian was not required to vote as there was already a majority and did not say how he would have voted as both acts were in his category.

==== Week 5 (26/27 October) ====
- Theme: Trailblazers
- Group performance: "Whip It!" with LunchMoney Lewis
- Celebrity performers: LunchMoney Lewis ("Bills"), Peking Duk ("Say My Name") and Nathaniel ("Always Be Yours")

Acts' performances on the fifth live show
Act	Category (mentor)	Order	Song	Result
Louise Adams	Over 25s (Blunt)	1	"Bad Romance"	Safe
Michaela Baranov	Girls (Minogue)	2	"Diamonds"	Bottom Two
Big T	Boys (Isaak)	3	"Jailhouse Rock"	Safe
Jess & Matt	Groups (Sebastian)	4	"Dancing in the Dark"	Safe
Natalie Conway	Over 25s (Blunt)	5	"I Have Nothing"	Safe
Cyrus Villanueva	Boys (Isaak)	6	"Rumour Has It"	Safe
Mahalia Simpson	Girls (Minogue)	7	"Tears Dry on Their Own"	Bottom Two
Final showdown details
Act	Category (mentor)	Order	Song	Result
Mahalia Simpson	Girls (Minogue)	1	"Ready for Love"	Safe
Michaela Baranov	Girls (Minogue)	2	"The Winner Takes It All"	Eliminated

Judges' vote to eliminate

- Sebastian: Michaela Baranov – stated he was fond of Simpson.
- Isaak: Michaela Baranov – thought Simpson was suited to the show.
- Minogue: Mahalia Simpson – decided to vote for Simpson in an attempt to give Blunt an opportunity to send the result to deadlock.
- Blunt: Michaela Baranov – felt Simpson had improved more.

Notes

- On 7 November 2015, the performances of two acts entered the ARIA Singles Chart. Jess & Matt's performance of "Dancing in the Dark" debuted at number 107 and Cyrus Villanueva's performance of "Rumour Has It" debuted at number 109.

==== Week 6 (2/3 November) ====
- Theme: Judge's Challenge
- Group performance: "Fight Song"
- Celebrity performers: Rachel Platten ("Stand by You"), Hozier ("From Eden") and Aston Merrygold ("Show Me")

Acts' performances on the sixth live show
Act	Category (mentor)	Order	Song	Chosen by	Result
Natalie Conway	Over 25s (Blunt)	1	"Toca's Miracle"	Dannii Minogue	Bottom Two
Jess & Matt	Groups (Sebastian)	2	"Stay"	James Blunt	Safe
Cyrus Villanueva	Boys (Isaak)	3	"Knockin' on Heaven's Door"	Guy Sebastian	Safe
Louise Adams	Over 25s (Blunt)	4	"You Don't Own Me"	Chris Isaak	Safe
Mahalia Simpson	Girls (Minogue)	5	"Chasing Pavements"	Guy Sebastian	Bottom Two
Big T	Boys (Isaak)	6	"Locked Out of Heaven"	Dannii Minogue	Safe
Final showdown details
Act	Category (mentor)	Order	Song		Result
Mahalia Simpson	Girls (Minogue)	1	"No More Drama"		Safe
Natalie Conway	Over 25s (Blunt)	2	"Nothing Compares 2 U"		Eliminated

Judges' vote to eliminate

- Minogue: Natalie Conway – backed her own act, Mahalia Simpson.
- Blunt: Mahalia Simpson – backed his own act, Natalie Conway.
- Isaak: Natalie Conway – felt there was something "unique" about Simpson.
- Sebastian: Mahalia Simpson – could not decide and sent the result to deadlock.

With the acts in the bottom two receiving two votes each, the result was reverted to the earlier public vote for the first time this season. Conway received the fewest votes and was eliminated.

Notes

- On 14 November 2015, the performances of three acts entered the ARIA Singles Chart. Jess & Matt's performance of "Stay" debuted at number 68, Cyrus Villanueva's performance of "Knockin' on Heaven's Door" debuted at number 80, and Louise Adams' performance of "You Don't Own Me" debuted at number 94.

==== Week 7: Quarter-Final (9/10 November) ====
- Mentor: Samantha Jade
- Group performance: "Time After Time"
- Celebrity performers:
  - Monday: Marlisa Punzalan ("Forever Young")
  - Tuesday: Vance Joy ("Fire and the Flood") and Samantha Jade ("Shake That")

Acts' performances in the quarter-final
Act	Category (mentor)	Order	Song	Result
Cyrus Villanueva	Boys (Isaak)	1	"Love Me like You Do"	Safe
Mahalia Simpson	Girls (Minogue)	2	"I Try"	Bottom Two
Jess & Matt	Groups (Sebastian)	3	"You're the One That I Want"	Safe
Big T	Boys (Isaak)	4	"All of Me"	Bottom Two
Louise Adams	Over 25s (Blunt)	5	"I Put a Spell on You"	Safe
Final showdown details
Act	Category (mentor)	Order	Song	Result
Mahalia Simpson	Girls (Minogue)	1	"The Climb"	Eliminated
Big T	Boys (Isaak)	2	"I Believe I Can Fly"	Safe

Judges' vote to eliminate

- Isaak: Mahalia Simpson – backed his own act, Big T.
- Minogue: Big T – backed her own act, Mahalia Simpson.
- Sebastian: Big T – felt that Simpson was "ready as an artist".
- Blunt: Mahalia Simpson – felt that The X Factor "squashed" her artistry.

With the acts in the bottom two receiving two votes each, the result went to deadlock and reverted to the earlier public vote for the second week in a row. Simpson was eliminated as the act with the fewest public votes.

Notes

- For the first time this season, there was no theme and each mentor picked any song they wanted for their remaining acts.
- On 21 November 2015, Jess & Matt's performance of "You're the One That I Want" debuted at number 30 on the ARIA Singles Chart.

==== Week 8: Semi-Final (16/17 November) ====
- Theme: Killer Tracks and Curveballs
- Group performance: "Que Sera" with Justice Crew
- Celebrity performers:
  - Monday: One Direction ("Perfect")
  - Tuesday: Justice Crew ("Good Time"), Guy Sebastian ("Black & Blue") and Rob Thomas ("Hold on Forever")

Acts' performances in the semi-final
Act	Category (mentor)	Order	Killer Track song	Order	Curveball song	Result
Big T	Boys (Isaak)	1	"Marvin Gaye"	5	"A Whiter Shade of Pale"	Bottom Two
Jess & Matt	Groups (Sebastian)	6	"Need You Now"	2	"I Was Made for Lovin' You"	Safe
Louise Adams	Over 25s (Blunt)	3	"Ain't No Sunshine"	8	"Blame It on Me"	Bottom Two
Cyrus Villanueva	Boys (Isaak)	4	"Don't"	7	"In the Air Tonight"	Safe
Final showdown details
Act	Category (mentor)	Order	Song			Result
Big T	Boys (Isaak)	1	"Crazy"			Eliminated
Louise Adams	Over 25s (Blunt)	2	"Roxanne"			Safe

Judges' vote to send through to the Grand Final

- Isaak: Big T – backed his own act, Big T.
- Blunt: Louise Adams – backed his own act, Louise Adams.
- Sebastian: Louise Adams – felt that Adams was ready to "step off the stage and play a festival".
- Minogue: Big T – could not decide and sent the result to deadlock.

With the acts in the bottom two receiving two votes each, the result went to deadlock and reverted to the earlier public vote for the third week in a row. Adams advanced to the final as the act with the most public votes.

Notes

- A video of One Direction's performance of "Perfect" on The X Factor UK was shown on Monday night.

==== Week 9: Final (23/24 November) ====
23 November

- Themes: Audition song; winner's song; grand final song
- Group performance: "What I Did for Love" (Top 3)

Contestants' performances on the ninth live show
Act	Category (mentor)	Order	Audition song	Order	Winner's song	Order	Grand final song	Result
Cyrus Villanueva	Boys (Isaak)	1	"Earned It"	4	"Stone"	7	"Jealous"	Safe
Jess & Matt	Groups (Sebastian)	2	"Georgia"	5	"Nothing Matters"	8	"Lay Me Down"	Eliminated
Louise Adams	Over 25s (Blunt)	3	"Feeling Good"	6	"History"	9	"Someone Like You"	Safe

Jess & Matt received the fewest public votes and were automatically eliminated.

24 November

- Theme: Best Song
- Group performances:
  - "Lean On" (Top 12)
  - "You're Beautiful" (Top 12 with James Blunt)
  - "One" (Top 2)
- Celebrity performers: Jason Derulo ("Get Ugly"), Rudimental ("Lay It All on Me") and Kylie Minogue & Dannii Minogue ("100 Degrees")

Act	Category (mentor)	Order	Best Moment song	Result
Cyrus Villanueva	Boys (Isaak)	1	"Wicked Game"	Winner
Louise Adams	Over 25s (Blunt)	2	"People Help the People"	Runner-Up

== Reception ==
=== Controversy and criticism ===
During the third live show on 12 October, controversy occurred between Minogue and Blunt after Minogue's contestant, Georgia Denton performed "I'll Be There" by Jackson 5. Blunt, Sebastian and Isaak felt the tune was not suited to her. Denton was eliminated on the live decider the following night in a special double elimination after receiving the fewest votes from the public. During the rock-themed fourth live show on 19 October, another controversy occurred when Blunt and Isaak got into a heated argument over Isaak's song choice for his contestant Cyrus Villanueva, who performed "It Ain't Over 'til It's Over" by Lenny Kravitz. Blunt felt that it was "a soul-funk song, not a rock song". Isaak did not appreciate Blunt's feedback towards him and said, "To hear James tell me what rock and roll is... I don't know what they pass as rock and roll at the disco in Ibiza, but that was rock and roll!" Isaak told Blunt to "shut up" several times.

More controversy occurred in the Judges' Challenge-themed week six live show when Big T performed "Locked Out of Heaven" by Bruno Mars as chosen by Minogue, but failed to impress the judges with his rendition of the song. Big T failed to find the correct key at the beginning of the song and was left deflated once the performance had ended. After the performance, Blunt criticized Big T by telling him that he was in danger of sounding like a "cruise ship" act. Big T's mentor Isaak then lost control and foul-mouthed at Blunt. The fight between Isaak and Blunt continued off-camera with Sebastian trying to calm them down.

=== Ratings ===
Colour key:
– Highest rating during the season
– Lowest rating during the season

Week	Episode		Original airdate	Timeslot	Viewers (millions)	Nightly rank	Ref.
1	1	"Auditions"	13 September 2015	Sunday 7:00 pm–8:42 pm	1.506	#1	
1	2	"Auditions"	14 September 2015	Monday 7:30 pm–9:16 pm	1.220	#1	
1	3	"Auditions"	15 September 2015	Tuesday 7:30 pm–8:44 pm	1.136	#4	
1	4	"Auditions"	16 September 2015	Wednesday 7:30 pm–9:00 pm	0.934	#7	
1	5	"Auditions"	17 September 2015	Thursday 7:30 pm–8:55 pm	0.902	#7	
2	6	"Bootcamp"	20 September 2015	Sunday 7:00 pm–8:44 pm	1.260	#1	
2	7	"Bootcamp"	21 September 2015	Monday 7:30 pm–9:09 pm	1.132	#1	
2	8	"Bootcamp"	22 September 2015	Tuesday 7:30 pm–8:40 pm	1.092	#2	
2	9	"Super home visits"	23 September 2015	Wednesday 7:30 pm–9:17 pm	0.953	#5	
2	10	"Super home visits"	24 September 2015	Thursday 8:00 pm–9:17 pm	0.876	#6	
3	11	"Live show 1"	27 September 2015	Sunday 7:00 pm–9:32 pm	1.011	#4	
3	12	"Live decider 1"	29 September 2015	Tuesday 7:30 pm–8:42 pm	1.083	#4	
4	13	"Live show 2"	5 October 2015	Monday 7:30 pm–9:55 pm	0.948	#8	
4	14	"Live decider 2"	6 October 2015	Tuesday 7:30 pm–8:43 pm	0.953	#8	
5	15	"Live show 3"	12 October 2015	Monday 7:30 pm–9:44 pm	1.017	#5	
5	16	"Live decider 3"	13 October 2015	Tuesday 7:30 pm–8:48 pm	0.982	#6	
6	17	"Live show 4"	19 October 2015	Monday 7:30 pm–9:16 pm	1.028	#4	
6	18	"Live decider 4"	20 October 2015	Tuesday 7:30 pm–8:42 pm	1.003	#4	
7	19	"Live show 5"	26 October 2015	Monday 7:30 pm–9:13 pm	1.003	#8	
7	20	"Live decider 5"	27 October 2015	Tuesday 7:30 pm–8:45 pm	0.965	#7	
8	21	"Live show 6"	2 November 2015	Monday 7:30 pm–8:54 pm	1.005	#2	
8	22	"Live decider 6"	3 November 2015	Tuesday 7:30 pm–8:47 pm	1.102	#7	
9	23	"Live show 7"	9 November 2015	Monday 7:30 pm–8:57 pm	0.974	#5	
9	24	"Live decider 7"	10 November 2015	Tuesday 7:30 pm–8:47 pm	1.031	#2	
10	25	"Live show 8"	16 November 2015	Monday 7:30 pm–9:28 pm	0.958	#6	
10	26	"Live decider 8"	17 November 2015	Tuesday 7:30 pm–8:40 pm	0.920	#5	
11	27	"Live grand final show"	23 November 2015	Monday 7:30 pm–9:59 pm	1.020	#5	
11	28	"Live grand final decider"	24 November 2015	Tuesday 7:30 pm–9:50 pm	1.045	#2	
11	28	"Winner announced"	24 November 2015	Tuesday 7:30 pm–9:50 pm	1.204	#1	

== See also ==
- Television in Australia
