= Reece Mastin discography =

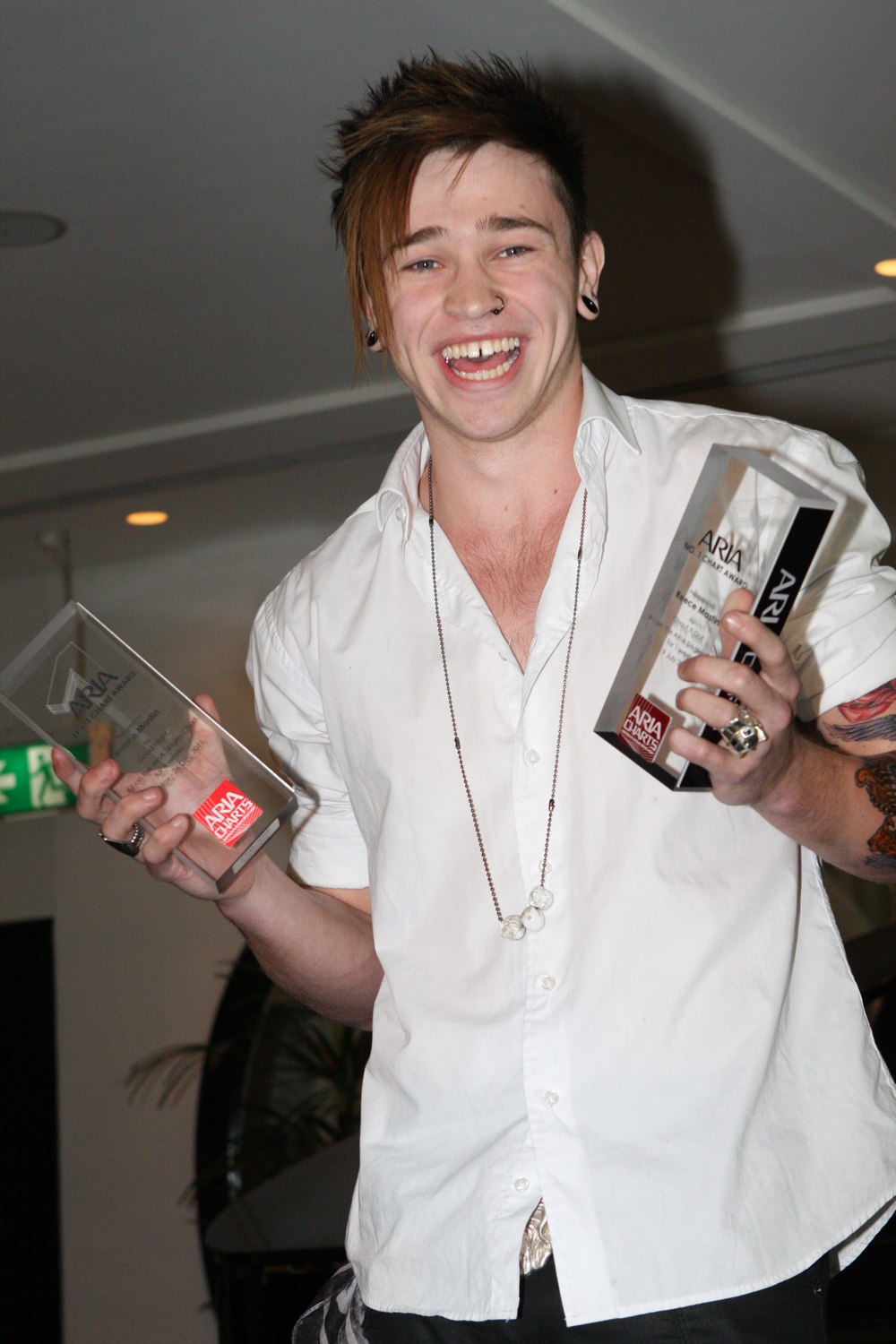
- Mastin at the 2012 ARIA No. 1 Chart Awards
- Studio albums: 3
- Extended plays: 2
- Singles: 11
- Video albums: 1
- Music videos: 9
- Album appearances: 3

The discography of British-Australian singer-songwriter Reece Mastin consists of three studio albums, two extended plays, one DVD, eleven singles and nine music videos. He won the third season of The X Factor Australia in 2011. Mastin's debut single "Good Night" debuted at number one on the ARIA Singles Chart and was certified five times platinum by the Australian Recording Industry Association (ARIA), denoting sales of 350,000 copies. It also peaked at number one on the New Zealand Singles Chart and was certified platinum by the Recorded Music NZ (RMNZ), denoting sales of 15,000 copies. Mastin's self-titled debut album, which features "Good Night" and selected songs he performed on The X Factor, was released on 9 December 2011. The album debuted at number two on the ARIA Albums Chart and was certified double platinum for shipments of 140,000 copies. It also debuted at number one in New Zealand and was certified gold for sales of 7,500 copies.

"Shut Up & Kiss Me" was released as the lead single from Mastin's second studio album Beautiful Nightmare. It peaked at number two on the ARIA Singles Chart and was certified platinum, denoting sales of 70,000 copies. "Shut Up & Kiss Me" peaked at number one in New Zealand and was certified gold. The album's second single "Shout It Out" became Mastin's second number-one single on the ARIA Charts and was certified platinum. Beautiful Nightmare was released on 19 October 2012, and debuted at number three and was certified gold for shipments of 35,000 copies. It also debuted at number two on the New Zealand Albums Chart. "Rock Star" and "Timeless" were released as the third and fourth singles from the album. The former peaked at number 16 and was certified platinum.

== Studio albums ==
Title	Album details	Peak chart positions		Certifications
Title	Album details	AUS	NZ	Certifications
Reece Mastin	Released: 9 December 2011; Formats: CD, digital download; Label: Sony Music Australia	2	1	ARIA: 2× Platinum; RMNZ: Gold
Beautiful Nightmare	Released: 19 October 2012; Formats: CD, digital download; Label: Sony Music Australia	3	2	ARIA: Gold; RMNZ: Gold
Change Colours	Released: 9 October 2015; Formats: CD, digital download; Label: Social Family	12	—	

== Extended plays ==
Title	EP details	Peak chart positions
Title	EP details	NZ
Rebel and the Reason	Released: 1 May 2015; Formats: CD, digital download; Label: Social Family	37
Suitcase of Stories	Released: 6 April 2018; Formats: Digital download, streaming; Label: Self-released	—

== Singles ==
Title	Year	Peak chart positions		Certifications	Album
Title	Year	AUS	NZ	Certifications	Album
"Good Night"	2011	1	1	ARIA: 5× Platinum; RMNZ: Platinum	Reece Mastin
"Shut Up & Kiss Me"	2012	2	1	ARIA: Platinum; RMNZ: Gold	Beautiful Nightmare
"Shout It Out"	2012	1	8	ARIA: Platinum	Beautiful Nightmare
"Rock Star"	2012	16	14	ARIA: Platinum	Beautiful Nightmare
"Timeless"	2013	85	—		Beautiful Nightmare
"Girls (All Around the World)"	2013	59	—		—N/a
"Rebel and the Reason"	2015	51	—		Rebel and the Reason
"Even Angels Cry"	2015	124	—		Change Colours
"Heartache Blues"	2016	—	—		Change Colours
"Not the Man for You"	2018	—	—		Suitcase of Stories
"Me Without You" (with Caitlyn Shadbolt)	2018	—	—		Songs on My Sleeve
"The River"	2020	—	—		Non-album single
"On the Run"	2022	—	—		Non-album single
"Wembley"	2025	—	—		Non-album single
"Blackhole"	2026	—	—		Upcoming fourth album
"—" denotes a recording that did not chart in that country.

== Other charted songs ==
Title	Year	Peak chart positions		Album
Title	Year	AUS	NZ	Album
"She Will Be Loved"	2011	87	32	Reece Mastin

== Album appearances ==
Title	Year	Album
"All I Want for Christmas Is You"	2012	The Spirit of Christmas 2012
"Handle with Care"	2018	Vale by Jason Singh

== Videography ==
=== Video albums ===
Title	Album details	Peak chart positions	Certifications
Title	Album details	AUS	Certifications
Behind Closed Doors	Released: 21 September 2012; Formats: DVD; Label: Sony Music Australia	1	ARIA: Platinum
