= Behind Closed Doors (video) =

Video by Reece Mastin
- Released: September 2012
- Genre: Rock, pop rock
- Length: 78 minutes
- Label: Sony
- Director: Brent Quincy Buchanan

Behind Closed Doors is a video album by British-Australian singer Reece Mastin. It was released in September 2012 by Sony Music Australia.

The DVD features a documentary on Mastin's music career to date, with interviews from close friends and family and The X Factor mentor Guy Sebastian. The DVD also features video clips, behind the scenes footage of the making of the videos and stripped-back acoustic performances.

== Background ==
In 2011, Reece Mastin auditioned for the third season of The X Factor Australia, where he was mentored by Guy Sebastian. In November 2011, he was declared the winner and released his debut single "Good Night" which debuted at number one on the ARIA Charts and was certified 4× Platinum. In December 2011, Mastin's debut self titled album was released and debuted at number one and was certified 2× Platinum. In 2012, further platinum singles "Shut Up & Kiss Me" and "Shout It Out" were released, the latter peaking at number one, making Mastin the first Australian this decade to score two chart-topping singles. Throughout 2012, Mastin performed live shows across Australia and worked on his second studio album Beautiful Nightmare, which was released in October 2012.

== Track listing ==
1. Behind Closed Doors Documentary – 36:11
2. "Good Night" (music video) – 3:04
3. "Shut Up & Kiss Me" (music video) – 3:26
4. "Shout It Out" (music video) – 3:35
5. Music Videos – Behind the Scenes – 6:14
6. "Good Night" (acoustic) – 3:16
7. "Message in a Bottle" (acoustic) – 3:27
8. "Shut Up & Kiss Me" (acoustic) – 3:28
9. "She Will Be Loved" (acoustic) – 4:20
10. "Timeless" (acoustic) – 4:54
11. Behind the Scenes on the ARIA Red Carpet 2011 – 2:21
12. Recording the Album – Days 1 & 2 – 3:01
13. "Shut Up & Kiss Me" (photo shoot) – 0:28

== Charts ==
Chart (2012–13)	Peak position
Australian Music DVDs (ARIA)	1

== Certifications ==
Region	Certification	Certified units/sales
Australia (ARIA)	Platinum	15,000^{^}
^{^} Shipments figures based on certification alone.

== Release history ==
Region	Date	Format	Label	Catalogue
Australia	21 September 2012	DVD	Sony Music Australia	88725420579
