= Beautiful Nightmare (album) =

Studio album by Reece Mastin
- Released: 19 October 2012
- Recorded: 2011–12
- Genre: Pop rock
- Label: Sony
- Producers: Louis Biancaniello; Michael Biancaniello; Gary Clark; DNA; Matthew Gerrard; Robin Grubert; Jon Ingoldsby; Lindsay Rimes; Louis Schoorl; Scott Stevens; Rune Westberg

Reece Mastin chronology
Reece Mastin (2011)	Beautiful Nightmare (2012)	Rebel and the Reason (2015)

Singles from Beautiful Nightmare
- 1. "Shut Up & Kiss Me" Released: 20 April 2012; 2. "Shout It Out" Released: 29 June 2012; 3. "Rock Star" Released: 5 October 2012; 4. "Timeless" Released: 1 March 2013

Beautiful Nightmare is the second studio album by British-Australian singer Reece Mastin, released on 19 October 2012, by Sony Music Australia. It is the follow-up to Mastin's self-titled debut album, and his first album to be made up of solely original material. In composing the album, Mastin collaborated with several songwriters and producers, including DNA Songs, Benji Madden, Lindsay Rimes, Damon Sharpe, Louis Biancaniello, Brian Howes and Rune Westberg, among others.

Beautiful Nightmare debuted at number three on the Australian ARIA Albums Chart and number two on the New Zealand Albums Chart. The album was preceded by the lead single "Shut Up & Kiss Me" in April 2012, which debuted at number one on the New Zealand Singles Chart and number two on the ARIA Singles Chart. The song was certified platinum by the Australian Recording Industry Association (ARIA), and gold by the Recording Industry Association of New Zealand (RIANZ). The second single "Shout It Out" was released in June 2012, which debuted at number one on the ARIA Singles Chart and was certified platinum. "Rock Star" was released as the album's third single.

== Development and writing ==
Beautiful Nightmare is the follow-up to Mastin's self-titled debut album, which features selected songs he performed as part of the top twelve on The X Factor (Australia). Beautiful Nightmare also serves as Mastin's first album to include original material. In an interview with MTV Australia in December 2011, Mastin said he had already written new material for the album. He described the material as a mixture of old school and modern sounds "that's not really on the radio at that moment, which I think is cool". Mastin went on to say that most of the lyrical content in the songs "are about girls [...] But there's [also] a lot about going out with the boys and having a good night".

In April 2012, Mastin announced he was in the studio writing songs with Benji Madden of Good Charlotte, and Ilan Kidron of The Potbelleez. Mastin and Madden collaborated on the song "Give Up the Girl". Reminiscing on working with Madden, he said, "It was awesome, he was just a dude. He just came in and sat down, and we hung out for about an hour and a half and just started writing. We came out with something pretty awesome!." In an interview with MTV Australia in May 2012, Mastin described the songs he wrote with Kidron: "It doesn't sound like The Potbelleez – I didn't wanna go in and write a Potbelleez track – but it's cool, what we came out with is awesome". The album's first single "Shut Up & Kiss Me" was written by Mastin, Hayley Warner, and Anthony Egizii and David Musumeci of the production duo DNA Songs. The latter two also wrote the second single "Shout It Out" with Mastin. He also collaborated with other songwriters and producers, including Lindsay Rimes, Khalil Walton, Michael Gerrard, and Jenna & Wac of Tonight Alive. In an interview with the Sydney Morning Herald, Mastin described the album's sound, saying "[It's] a lot of fun. It's rock blended with everything. If you think of your favourite rock song, it's that combined with pop stuff and club stuff [...] to make it awesome. It's Reece from all angles, really – it's everything I could think of."

== Music and lyrics ==
Musically, Beautiful Nightmare is of the pop and rock genres. Its first song "Addictive" is a synth-driven rock song, which features "light reggae segments". The second song "Rock Star" is a pop rock song, which features "American sounding guitar riffs". A writer for Take 40 Australia likened the song's sound to Wheatus and Jimmy Eat World. Cameron Adams of the Herald Sun noted that the song "channels" Wheatus' "Teenage Dirtbag" (2000) Avril Lavigne's "Sk8er Boi" (2002). The album's title track "Beautiful Nightmare" is a dubstep and horror rock song "slightly reminiscent of Muse". "Stars" has been described as a "romantic song", which sees Mastin "heading back to more traditional pop." In an interview with the Herald Sun, Mastin revealed that the song is about his girlfriend Rhiannon Fish. The album's fifth song "Dirty Paradise" is a pop punk song, which "features fast lyrics such as 'You gave it up last week / now I've been losing sleep / thinking about what we used to do'".

"Alive" is an "uplifting" rock song, which uses the tom-tom drum. Its lyrics depict the tale of Mastin "learning to believe in himself again". He stated that the song is about his X Factor mentor Guy Sebastian, saying "It's an important thing for me; that's where it all started for me. I changed so much over the show and Guy definitely helped with that." "She's a Killer" features a "funky Panic! at the Disco-esque" introduction and contains lyrics about "a super-hot girl". "Freakshow", the ninth song from Beautiful Nightmare, is a contemporary rock song with influences by Muse. "Shut Up & Kiss Me" is an upbeat pop punk song, which contains lyrics about "making out with a girl". Mastin described it as "a tongue-in-cheek, muck around song". "She Calls This Love" features lyrics about a "boy stuck in a relationship who realises that he's not in love with his girl anymore". The album's last song "Give Up the Girl" is a rock song that makes reference to Superman.

== Reception ==
Cameron Adams of the Herald Sun awarded Beautiful Nightmare three and a half stars, writing that the album "Sounds like teen spirit". The Border Mail's Jamie Horne also gave the album three and a half stars, calling it "fun and punchy — there's equally great pop to rock moments". Beautiful Nightmare debuted at number three on the ARIA Albums Chart on 29 October 2012, becoming Mastin's second consecutive top-five album on the chart. That same week, the album debuted at number two on the New Zealand Albums Chart. Beautiful Nightmare was certified gold by the Australian Recording Industry Association (ARIA), denoting shipments of 35,000 copies. It was also certified gold by the Recording Industry Association of New Zealand (RIANZ), denoting shipments of 7,500 copies.

== Release and promotion ==
Beautiful Nightmare was released through Sony Music Australia on 19 October 2012, as both digital download and CD formats. On 16 October 2012, Mastin performed "Rock Star" during the live results show of the fourth season of The X Factor (Australia). During the week of the album's release (19–25 October), Mastin toured several Westfield shopping malls in Melbourne, Adelaide, Brisbane and Sydney, to perform songs from Beautiful Nightmare and sign CD copies of the album for fans.

=== The Summer Nights Tour ===
To further promote the album, Mastin embarked on The Summer Nights Tour across Australia and New Zealand, which began on 1 December 2012 in Perth, and ended in Dunedin on 24 February 2013. Justice Crew and Janoskians served as the supporting acts for the nine capital city show dates of the Australian leg of the tour, and Evan Sinton was the supporting act for all eight show dates of the New Zealand leg.

Date	Country	Location	Venue
1 December 2012	Australia	Perth	Perth Arena
4 December 2012	Australia	Adelaide	Adelaide Entertainment Centre
6 December 2012	Australia	Melbourne	Hisense Arena
8 December 2012	Australia	Sydney	Hordern Pavilion
11 December 2012	Australia	Brisbane	Brisbane Entertainment Centre
8 January 2013	Australia	Townsville	The Venue
9 January 2013	Australia	Mackay	Mackay Entertainment Centre
10 January 2013	Australia	Gladstone	Gladstone Entertainment Centre
11 January 2013	Australia	Bundaberg	Moncrieff Theatre
12 January 2013	Australia	Caloundra	Events Centre
13 January 2013	Australia	Gold Coast	Gold Coast Convention and Exhibition Centre Halls
15 January 2013	Australia	Lismore	Lismore Workers Club
16 January 2013	Australia	Coffs Harbour	Coff's Ex-Services Club
17 January 2013	Australia	Port Macquarie	Port Macquarie Panthers
18 January 2013	Australia	Great Lakes Council	Club Forster
19 January 2013	Australia	Newcastle	Newcastle Entertainment Centre
20 January 2013	Australia	Penrith	Penrith Panthers
22 January 2013	Australia	Wollongong	Wollongong Entertainment Centre
23 January 2013	Australia	Canberra	AIS Arena
24 January 2013	Australia	Wagga Wagga	Capital Entertainment Centre
25 January 2013	Australia	Albury	Albury Entertainment Centre
26 January 2013	Australia	Geelong	Geelong Arena
14 February 2013	New Zealand	Hamilton	Founders Theatre
15 February 2013	New Zealand	Auckland	Town Hall
16 February 2013	New Zealand	Tauranga	Baycourt Theatre
18 February 2013	New Zealand	New Plymouth	TSB Showplace
19 February 2013	New Zealand	Palmerston North	Regent on Broadway
21 February 2013	New Zealand	Wellington	Michael Fowler Centre
23 February 2013	New Zealand	Christchurch	CBS Canterbury Arena
24 February 2013	New Zealand	Dunedin	Regent Theatre

== Singles ==
"Shut Up & Kiss Me" was released as the album's lead single on 20 April 2012. The song debuted and peaked at number two on the ARIA Singles Chart, and became Mastin's second number-one single on the New Zealand Singles Chart. "Shut Up & Kiss Me" was certified platinum by the Australian Recording Industry Association (ARIA), and gold by the Recording Industry Association of New Zealand (RIANZ). "Shout It Out" was the second single released from Beautiful Nightmare on 29 June 2012. It was certified platinum and became Mastin's second number-one single on the ARIA Singles Chart, following his debut single "Good Night". Mastin became the first Australian artist to achieve two number one singles during the 2010s decade. In New Zealand, "Shout It Out" reached number eight. The album's third single "Rock Star" was released on 5 October 2012. It peaked at number 16 on the ARIA Singles Chart, and at number 14 on the New Zealand Singles Chart. "Rock Star" was certified platinum by the ARIA. "Timeless" was released as the fourth single on 1 March 2013. It debuted and peaked at number 85 on the ARIA Singles Chart.

== Track listing ==
No.	Title	Writer(s)	Producer(s)	Length
1.	"Addictive"	Reece Mastin; Jon Ingoldsby; Robin Grubert	Louis Schoorl; Ingoldsby^{[a]}; Grubert^{[a]}	3:15
2.	"Rock Star"	Mastin; Brian Howes; Rune Westberg	Westberg	2:57
3.	"Beautiful Nightmare"	Mastin; Gary Clark	Clark	2:59
4.	"Stars"	Mastin; Ingoldsby; Grubert	Grubert; Ingoldsby	4:02
5.	"Dirty Paradise"	Mastin; Damon Sharpe; Louis Biancaniello; Michael Biancaniello	L. Biancaniello; M. Biancaniello	3:25
6.	"Shout It Out"	Mastin; Anthony Egizii; David Musumeci	DNA	3:30
7.	"Alive"	Mastin; Lindsay Rimes	Rimes	3:23
8.	"She's a Killer"	Mastin; Khalil "Cassius D. Kalb" Walton; Matthew Gerrard	Gerrard	2:59
9.	"Freakshow"	Mastin; Andy Stochansky; Scott Stevens	Stevens	3:17
10.	"Timeless"	Mastin; Egizii; Musumeci	DNA	3:56
11.	"Ex-Girlfriend"	Mastin; Rimes	Rimes	3:11
12.	"Outta My Face"	Mastin; Egizii; Musumeci	DNA	3:19
13.	"Shut Up & Kiss Me"	Mastin; Egizii; Musumeci; Hayley Warner	DNA	3:20
14.	"She Calls This Love"	Mastin; Rimes	Rimes	3:36
15.	"Give Up the Girl"	Mastin; Rimes; Benji Madden; Benjamin Rogers; Marcus Catanzaro; Dave Jenkins Jnr	Rimes	3:42

Notes

- ^{^a} signifies a vocal producer

== Credits and personnel ==
Adapted from the liner notes of Beautiful Nightmare.

Locations

- Recorded at New Holland Studios, Sydney; The Rockpool, Los Angeles; Sony Studios, Sydney; Studios 301, Sydney.
- Mixed at New Holland Studios, Sydney; The Rockpool, Los Angeles; Song Rimes Studio.
- Drums engineered at Ultimate Rhythm Studio in Los Angeles.
- Mastered at Studios 301 in Sydney.

Creative and vocal credits

- Jeff Darmanin – photography
- Killanoodle – artwork design
- Benji Madden – additional backing vocals
- Reece Mastin – lead vocals, backing vocals
- David Musumeci (DNA) – backing vocals
- Louis Schoorl – backing vocals
- Scott Stevens – backing vocals

Technical credits

- Brian Allison – engineering, mixing
- Michael Avenaim – drums
- Louis Biancaniello – songwriter, producer
- Michael Biancaniello – songwriter, producer
- Marcus Catanzaro – songwriter
- Gary Clark – songwriter, producer, mixing, guitar, synth, bass, programming
- Carl Dimataga – additional acoustic guitars
- Anthony Egizii (DNA) – songwriter, producer, mixing, programming and keys
- Matthew Gerrard – songwriter, producer, guitars, bass, keyboards, programming
- Robin Grubert – songwriter, producer, vocal producer, mixing
- Anton Hagop – drums and bass engineering
- Brian Howes – songwriter
- Jon Ingoldsby – songwriter, producer, vocal producer, mixing
- Sean Ingoldsby – additional mastering
- Dave Jenkins Jnr – songwriter
- Chris Lord-Alge – mixing
- Benji Madden – songwriter
- Reece Mastin – songwriter, guitar, additional guitars, synth
- Mike Morgan – guitars engineering
- David Musumeci (DNA) – songwriter, producer, guitars, bass
- Brian Paturalski – mixing
- Lindsay Rimes – songwriter, producer, mixing, instruments, programming
- Ben Rodgers – guitars, bass
- Benjamin Rogers – songwriter
- Louis Schoorl – producer, recording, mixing, drums, guitars, bass, keyboards, programming
- Damon Sharpe – songwriter
- Scott Stevens – songwriter, producer, mixing, instrumentation, programming
- Andy Stochansky – songwriter
- Nathan Tuffin – drums
- Khalil "Cassius D. Kalb" Walton – songwriter
- Hayley Warner – songwriter
- Charlie Waymire – drums engineering
- Rune Westberg – songwriter, producer, mixing
- Leon Zervos – mastering

== Charts and certifications ==
=== Weekly charts ===
Chart (2012)	Peak position
Australian Albums Chart	3
New Zealand Albums Chart	2

=== Year-end charts ===
Chart (2012)	Position
Australian Albums Chart	54
Australian Artist Albums Chart	12

=== Certifications ===
Country	Certifications
Australia	Gold
New Zealand	Gold

== Release history ==
Country	Date	Format	Label
Australia	19 October 2012	CD, digital download	Sony Music Australia
New Zealand	19 October 2012	CD, digital download	Sony Music Australia
