= Rock Star (Reece Mastin song) =

Single by Reece Mastin

from the album Beautiful Nightmare
- Released: 5 October 2012
- Recorded: 2012
- Genre: Pop rock
- Length: 2:58
- Label: Sony
- Songwriters: Reece Mastin; Brian Howes; Rune Westberg
- Producer: Rune Westberg

Reece Mastin singles chronology
"Shout It Out" (2012)	"Rock Star" (2012)	"Timeless" (2013)

"Rock Star" is a song by British-Australian recording artist Reece Mastin, taken from his second studio album, Beautiful Nightmare (2012). It was released digitally on 5 October 2012, as the third single from the album. "Rock Star" was written by Mastin, Brian Howes and Rune Westberg, who also produced the song. "Rock Star" peaked at number 16 in Australia and number 14 in New Zealand. It was certified platinum by the Australian Recording Industry Association (ARIA), denoting sales of 70,000 copies.

== Composition and reception ==
"Rock Star" is a pop rock song that features "American sounding guitar riffs". A writer for Take 40 Australia likened the song's sound to Wheatus and Jimmy Eat World. Cameron Adams of the Herald Sun noted that it "channels" Wheatus' "Teenage Dirtbag" (2000) Avril Lavigne's "Sk8er Boi" (2002). Jamie Horne of The Border Mail described "Rock Star" as "super-likable". Scott Murphy of Smurphy Reviews refereed the song as having "Beautiful lyrical execution". A writer for The Hot Hits wrote that the song "does not disappoint". "Rock Star" also contains an allusion to Local H's “Eddie Vedder". Whereas Local H’s lyric reads, "If I was Eddie Vedder, would you like me any better?," Mastin’s song slightly alters it with the line, "If I was Eddie Vedder, I'd bet you'd like me better."

"Rock Star" debuted at number 31 on the ARIA Singles Chart dated 15 October 2012. The following week, it peaked at number 16. On the New Zealand Singles Chart, the song debuted and peaked at number 14. "Rock Star" was certified platinum by the Australian Recording Industry Association (ARIA), denoting sales of 70,000 copies.

== Music video ==
The accompanying music video for "Rock Star" premiered on Vevo on 9 October 2012.

== Track listing ==
- Digital download
1. "Rock Star" – 2:58
- CD single
1. "Rock Star" – 2:58
2. "Good Night" (Acoustic)
3. "Shut Up & Kiss Me" (Acoustic)
4. "Message in a Bottle" (Acoustic)

== Credits and personnel ==
Credits adapted from the liner notes of Beautiful Nightmare.

Locations

- Mastered at Studios 301 in Sydney.

Personnel

- Songwriting – Reece Mastin, Brian Howes, Rune Westberg
- Production – Rune Westberg
- Mixing – Rune Westberg
- Mastering – Leon Zervos

== Charts and certifications ==
=== Weekly charts ===
Chart (2012)	Peak position
Australia (ARIA)	16
New Zealand (Recorded Music NZ)	14

=== Year-end chart ===
Chart (2012)	Position
Australian Artist (ARIA)	18

=== Certifications ===
Country	Certifications
Australia	Platinum

== Release history ==
Region	Date	Format	Label
Australia	5 October 2012	Digital download	Sony Music Australia
New Zealand	5 October 2012	Digital download	Sony Music Australia
Australia	12 October 2012	CD single	Sony Music Australia
