= Switch 3 =

Australian band

Switchthree
- Origin: Canberra, Australia
- Genres: Indie rock Alternative rock
- Years active: 2002 – present
- Labels: Un-signed
- Members: Maf Davis – Guitar and Lead Vocals; Ben Davis – Guitar; Luke Pammenton – Drums; Mick Hoorweg – Bass Guitar
- Past members: Nick Lucey (Drums) 2002-2005; Evan Dorrian (Drums) 2005–2008
- Website: www.switchthree.com

Switch 3 is an Australian band that began in the Australian Capital Territory in late 2002.

== History ==
Switch 3 formed when Maf and Mick's previous band, LapSpeed, folded. Although LapSpeed was primarily a punk band, both Maf and Mick wanted to try something different with a new lineup and new sound. The search for a guitarist was short lived, with Maf making a call to his bass playing brother Ben, who would eventually join the band as a guitarist, passing bass duties to Mick. Next was the drummer. After a couple of abortive starts the three decided to put up some flyers looking for "a drummer who must be quick and use a double kick". Nick Lucey fit that bill perfectly and the early days of Switch 3 started.

Each member brought a different musical taste to the band. Maf grew up listening to such bands as Led Zeppelin, the Cure, and the Misfits. Mick was heavily influenced by Soundgarden, and Queen. Ben brought the old school metal edge with his preference for Iron Maiden, while Nick sat firmly in the pop punk camp.

Switch 3 quickly recorded a demo EP in 2003, Sidelined, followed up by another EP called Memories Fade in 2005. Touring on the back of Memories Fade took them to Japan where they played with some of the countries top melodic punk bands in Tokyo, Osaka, and Shirahama.

After the tour, Nick left the band to pursue his interests in another group.

The search for a new drummer ended when Evan Dorrian joined the fold. Evan stayed with the band through the recording of its first full-length album, Calm Before, and subsequent Australian based touring – after which he departed for Europe to pursue a career in jazz and experimental music.

Ben, Mick and Maf knew they had to get the right person to take over drum duties – someone that could help push the sound they wanted to craft to another level. With a relocation to Brisbane, Australia the search began in earnest and quickly ended the moment Luke Pammenton showed his chops honed from his time obtaining a Masters of drumming at the Queensland Conservatorium and regular sessions with his jazz band The Sounscapes Quintet. Luke joined Switch 3 in 2009

== Band members ==
The band's members are Maf Davis, Ben Davis, Luke Pammenton and Mick Hoorweg

== Tours and TV appearances ==
Switch 3 conducted a tour of Japan in 2005, which saw them sharing the stage with Japan's top melodic punk bands and winning over capacity crowds night after night in Shirahama, Osaka. and Tokyo. Switch 3 have also had their songs played on local and national radio stations within Australia, as well as appearing on television shows Video Hits, Rage and Saturday Disney.

Switch 3's second tour of Japan took place in 2010 during which the band welcomed the distinction of being the first Western band to ever perform in Tanabe (during the Tanabe Summer Festival). The tour also took it to Tokyo – a city that seems to keep drawing the band back as evidenced by word of a third tour to the city taking place in May 2011.

== Discography ==
Sidelined Sidelined was recorded in late 2003 and was released as a demo in limited numbers.

Tracks

- 1. All You Have To Say
- 2. Sidelined
- 3. Tiny
- 4. Today
- 5. Wish I

Memories Fade Recorded, produced and mixed by Anton Hagop at Electric Avenue Studios, Sydney, December 2004. Mastered by David Macquarie at Studios 301. Music by Davis, Davis and Hoorweg, lyrics by M Davis (AMCOS). Cover by Peter Rohen.

Tracks

- 1. Memories Fade
- 2. Stain
- 3. Blank Faces
- 4. Bulletproof
- 5. Taking Stock

Calm Before Recorded and mixed by Anton Hagop at Origami Studios, Sydney, January 2008. Produced by Anton Hagop and Switch 3. Mastered by Ted Jensen at Sterling Sound, New York. Music by Davis, Davis and Hoorweg, lyrics by M Davis (AMCOS). Cover photograph by Ali Nasseri, design by Peter Rohen.

Tracks

- 1. Last Day
- 2. Blackout
- 3. Come To Me
- 4. Esperance
- 5. The Prize
- 6. Rows of Sleep
- 7. An Axe, Hessian Sack and Quicklime
- 8. Calm Before
- 9. The Dunes
- 10. Sometimes

== Equipment ==
Switch 3 use:

- Mesa/Boogie Amps – (www.mesaboogie.com)
- Yamaha Guitars – (www.yamaha.com)
- Smith Optics – (www.smithoptics.com)
- Vance Custom Guitars
- BBE Sound
- TC Electronic
- Yamaha Drums
