= Beautiful Nightmare =

Beautiful Nightmare may refer to:

- "Beautiful Nightmare", a song by Skylar Grey
- "Sweet Dreams" (Beyoncé song), a 2009 song originally titled "Beautiful Nightmare" by Beyoncé Knowles
- Beautiful Nightmare (album), 2012 album by Reece Mastin
- "The Beautiful Nightmare," a ring name briefly held by wrestler Katarina Waters in 2009 during her time in ECW
