= Change Colours =

Studio album by Reece Mastin
- Released: 9 October 2015
- Studios: Jimmy's Freight Train Studios; Sydney
- Genre: Pop rock
- Length: 48:43
- Label: Social Family

Reece Mastin chronology
Rebel and the Reason (2015)	Change Colours (2015)	Suitcase of Stories (2018)

Singles from Change Colours
- 1. "Even Angels Cry" Released: 2 October 2015; 2. "Heartache Blues" Released: 22 April 2016

Change Colours is the third studio album by British-Australian singer Reece Mastin, released on 9 October 2015 by Social Family Records. It is the first studio album released by Mastin since leaving Sony Music Australia, and the follow-up to his 2015 extended play Rebel and the Reason. The album is described as a rock album "high on raw feelings, with songs ripped straight out of real-life experiences that cut to the heart of the matter". It was announced and became available for pre-order on 11 September 2015.

== Content and themes ==
Several songs on the album are about Mastin's split with Home and Away actress Rhiannon Fish, which, according to Mastin, was less than amicable. Mastin claims "there was a lot of arguing" but they ended on "good terms". Mastin states he wrestled with being so honest on the record but writing about how he felt proved to be "therapeutic". The album also documents anxiety and depression, with Mastin noting severing ties with Sony Music Australia and the 2014 Lindt chocolate café hostage crisis as having an impact on him.

== Reception ==
Aneta Grulichova of The Music awarded Change Colours two-and-a-half stars out of five, saying; "Reece Mastin was reborn with his EP Rebel and the Reason; now his new record has left rock'n'roll fans high and dry with a mushy, sad album." Australian Music Magazine gave the album 4 out of 5 stars, saying that it's a "raw, honest record that we love, and we hope more of Australia can change their opinion of Reece, this is the new Reece." Lauren Katulka of music review website Sound of Oz said about the album: "Change Colours isn’t like the other Reece Mastin albums, and that’s exactly why it’s so special. It showcases the work of a young artist that is releasing music he believes in, perhaps for the first time. If you’ve dismissed him as just another reality show winner, it's probably time to rethink your stance."

Change Colours debuted on the ARIA Album Chart at number 12, falling to number 72 in its second week. Change Colours also debuted on the ARIA Australian Artist Album Chart at number 5.

== Release and promotion ==
Change Colours was released on 9 October 2015 as both a digital download and on CD. Mastin made a number of in-store appearances, performances and signing throughout October across New South Wales, Victoria, Queensland and Western Australia to support the album.

== Singles ==
In late September, Mastin asked his fans to vote on which song they thought should be the album's first single. It was announced on 1 October via Twitter that "Even Angels Cry" had been chosen. It premiered on The Kyle and Jackie O Show on KIIS 106.5 the same day. It was released on 2 October. "Heartache Blues" was confirmed as the second single with a release date of 22 April 2016.

== Track listing ==
No.	Title	Writer(s)	Length
1.	"Lockdown"	Reece Mastin; Ben Rodgers; Mike Avenaim	3:17
2.	"You Could Be Wild"	Mastin; Rodgers; M. Catanzaro	3:39
3.	"I Don't Love You Anymore"	Mastin; Rodgers; Alain Whyte	3:54
4.	"Heartache Blues"	Rodgers; Mastin	4:11
5.	"You Gotta Go"	Rodgers; Mastin	3:19
6.	"Down to Earth" (featuring Alys Ffion)	Mastin; Alys Edwards	3:44
7.	"For You"	Mastin; Rodgers; Mahalia Barnes	3:29
8.	"Stand Up Be Proud"	Mastin; Steve Shebby; Rodgers	3:51
9.	"Caged Paradise"	Mastin; Mark Lizotte	3:17
10.	"Right out of Me"	Dave Darling; Mastin; Rodgers	4:04
11.	"We've Already Won"	Chris Cheney; Mastin; Rodgers	3:43
12.	"Even Angels Cry"	Audra Mae; Michael Paynter; Michael Delorenzis; Mastin	3:41
13.	"Change Colours"	Simon Olsen; Mastin; Rodgers	4:34
Total length:			48:43

Advanced stream bonus tracks
No.	Title	Writer(s)	Length
14.	"Rebel and the Reason" (live)	Rogers; Jean-Paul Fung; Mastin	4:50
15.	"Keep on Walking" (live)	Delorenzis; Paynter; Mastin	5:02
16.	"You Gotta Go" (live)	Rodgers; Mastin	3:37
Total length:			62:12

== Charts ==
Chart (2015)	Peak position
Australian Albums (ARIA)	12

== Release history ==
Country	Date	Format	Label	Catalogue
Australia	9 October 2015	CD, digital download	Social Family	SFR0041
