= Good Day (Hayley Warner song) =

Single by Hayley Warner
- Released: 11 December 2009 (Australia)
- Recorded: 2009
- Genre: Pop rock
- Length: 3:12
- Label: Sony Music Australia
- Songwriters: Andy Stochansky, Greg Critchley, Damhnait Doyle

Hayley Warner singles chronology
"Good Day" (2009)	"Hands Off" (2010)

Good Day is the debut single by Australian singer, Hayley Warner who was the runner-up in the 2009 season of Australian Idol. The song was written by Andy Stochansky, Greg Critchley and Damhnait Doyle and was available for digital download on 22 November 2009. The single was later released to radios and on physical CD on 11 December 2009 after signing a record contract with Sony Music.

The single debuted at #11 on the ARIA Singles Chart on 20 December 2009.

== Chart performance ==
Chart (2009)	Peak position
Australian Singles Chart	11

== Track listing ==
- Australian CD single
1. "Good Day" - 3:12

== Release history ==
Region	Date	Format
Australia	22 November 2009	Digital download
Australia	11 December 2009	CD single
