= Shout It Out (Reece Mastin song) =

2012 single by Reece Mastin

Single by Reece Mastin

from the album Beautiful Nightmare
- Released: 29 June 2012
- Recorded: Studios 301, Sydney
- Genre: Pop
- Length: 3:30
- Label: Sony
- Songwriter(s): Reece Mastin; Anthony Egizii; David Musumeci
- Producer(s): DNA

Reece Mastin singles chronology
"Shut Up & Kiss Me" (2012)	"Shout It Out" (2012)	"Rock Star" (2012)

"Shout It Out" is a song by British-Australian recording artist Reece Mastin, taken from his second studio album, Beautiful Nightmare (2012). It was released digitally on 29 June 2012, as the second single from the album. The song was written by Mastin and production duo DNA, who also produced it. "Shout It Out" peaked at number one in Australia and number eight in New Zealand. It was certified platinum by the Australian Recording Industry Association (ARIA), denoting sales of 70,000 copies. The accompanying music video features a cameo appearance by Home and Away actress Rhiannon Fish, who plays Mastin's love interest.

== Background and reception ==
"Shout It Out" was written by Reece Mastin with Anthony Egizii and David Musumeci of the production duo DNA, who also produced the song. It was released digitally on 29 June 2012, and physically on 3 August 2012. In Australia, the song debuted on the ARIA Singles Chart at number one on 9 July 2012, with first-week sales of 23,400 copies. It became Mastin's second number-one single on that chart, following his debut single "Good Night" (2011).

"Shout It Out" became the 97th song to debut atop the ARIA Singles Chart, and the 427th number-one single in the chart's history. The song was certified platinum by the Australian Recording Industry Association (ARIA), denoting sales of 70,000 copies. Mastin became the first Australian artist to achieve two number one singles during the 2010s decade. That same week, "Shout It Out" debuted and peaked at number eight on the New Zealand Singles Chart.

== Music video ==
The accompanying music video for "Shout It Out" premiered on Vevo on 1 July 2012. It features a cameo appearance by Home and Away actress Rhiannon Fish, who plays Mastin's love interest. The video sees the pair playing a couple on a road trip through the Atherton Tableland, going camping, swimming under a waterfall, and ending at a lookout view of Sydney. A writer for The Hot Hits called it "The hottest video of the year".

== Track listing ==
- CD single / digital download
1. "Shout It Out" – 3:30

== Credits and personnel ==
Credits adapted from the liner notes of Beautiful Nightmare.

Locations

- Recorded and mastered at Studios 301 in Sydney.

Personnel

- Songwriting – Reece Mastin, Anthony Egizii, David Musumeci
- Production – DNA
- Mixing – Anthony Egizii
- Programming and keys – Anthony Egizii
- Guitars and bass – David Musumeci
- Mastering – Leon Zervos

== Charts ==
=== Weekly charts ===
Chart (2012)	Peak position
Australia (ARIA)	1
New Zealand (Recorded Music NZ)	8

=== Year-end chart ===
Chart (2012)	Position
Australian Artist (ARIA)	20

== Certifications ==
Region	Certification	Certified units/sales
Australia (ARIA)	Platinum	70,000^{^}
^{^} Shipments figures based on certification alone.

== Release history ==
Region	Date	Format	Label
Australia	29 June 2012	Digital download	Sony Music Australia
Australia	3 August 2012	CD single	Sony Music Australia

== See also ==
- List of number-one singles of 2012 (Australia)
