= Felix Williamson =

Australian actor

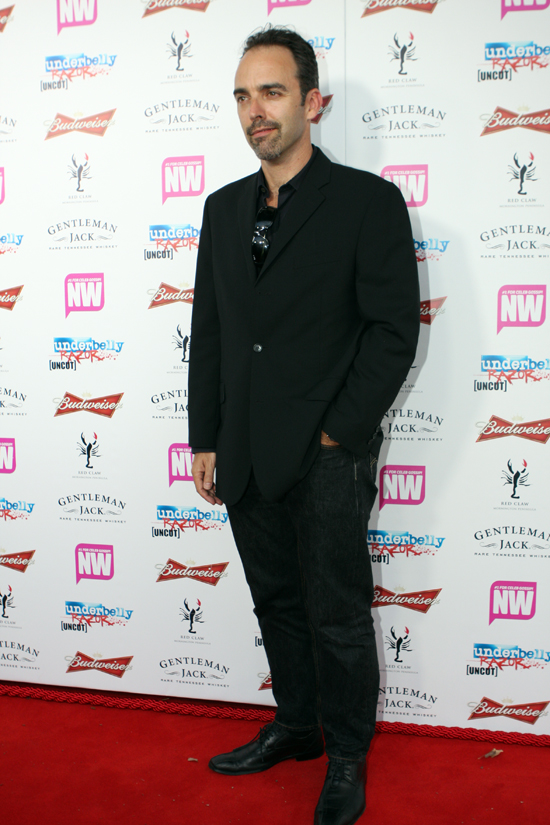
- Williamson at the Underbelly Razor DVD Party at East Village Surry Hills in 2011
- Born: 29 May 1969 (age 57); Melbourne, Victoria, Australia
- Occupation: Actor
- Spouse: Liz Fell

Felix Williamson (born 29 May 1969) is an Australian actor.

== Early life ==
Williamson is the stepson of playwright David Williamson. From age 13–17, he trained at the Australian Theatre for Young People in Sydney, Australia, learning the foundations of acting.

== Career ==
He has had many roles in television, film and theatre and portrayed Paul Keating in the 2010 telemovie, Hawke opposite Richard Roxburgh's Bob Hawke.

He portrays a Commonwealth Bank executive in various advertisements for the bank, usually in the role of rebuffing advice from incompetent American advertisement consultants who display ignorance of Australian society and buffoon-like behaviour.

Felix has taken part in a variety of television shows including famous to CBBC, Me and My Monsters playing Nick Carlson (Dad), and Underbelly: Razor.

== Personal life ==
Williamson lives with his wife, theatre producer Liz Fell, who together ran Naked Theatre Company from 2001 to 2005.

== Credits ==
=== Film ===
Year	Title	Role	Notes
2023	Devil Beneath	Mr Richards	
2019	Koko: A Red Dog Story	Nelson Woss	
2019	Standing Up for Sunny	Scott	
2019	Palm Beach	Taxi Driver / Agent	
2019	Little Monsters	Novak	
2018	Nekrotronic	Ginsberg	
2018	Occupation	Seth Grimes	
2018	Shock Verdict: Rake Delivers	Lawyer	Short
2018	Peter Rabbit	Derek	
2016	Red Billabong	John Richards	
2016	VR Noir	Adam	Video Game
2016	Gods of Egypt	Nobleman	
2015	Truth	Mike Massal	
2013	Backyard Ashes	Edward Lords	
2013	The Great Gatsby	Henri	
2012	The Red Valentine	The Detective	Short
2012	The Mystery of a Hansom Cab	Detective Kilsip	TV Movie
2012	Inhumane Resources	Brian Keene	
2012	Mabo	Ron Castan	TV Movie
2011	Commercialisms	Chuck	Short
2010	Hawke	Paul Keating	TV Movie
2010	Shock	Father	Short
2008	Haunted Echoes	Kenneth Monk	Video
2006	Happy Feet	Live Action Cast	
2005	In A Pickle	Father	Short
2005	A Family Legacy	Commentator	Short
2004	Go Big	Miles	TV Movie
2003	The Rage in Placid Lake	Lift Guy	
2003	Ned	Sinclair	
2003	Criminal Ways	Bill	
2002	Dirty Deeds	Sal Cassela	
2002	The Road from Coorain	Milton	TV Movie
2001	My Brother Jack	Sam Burlington	TV Movie
2001	WillFull	Scott	
2000	Mr. Accident	"Rats"	
1999	Strange Planet	Neil	
1999	Me Myself I	Geoff	
1998	The Thin Red Line	Private Drake	
1998	Babe: Pig in the City	Raider	
1997	The Wedding Party	Woozle	
1997	Dust Off the Wings	Alex	
1997	Welcome to Woop Woop	Jerome	

=== TV Series ===
Year	Title	Role	Notes
2025	Return to Paradise	Brendan Trapmore	1 episode
2024	Roast Night	Russell	1 episode
2023	Wolf Like Me	Willem	2 episodes
2023	The Messenger	Don King	5 episodes
2023	Wellmania	Damien	2 episodes
2022	Grey Nomads	Lesley Hegney	6 episodes
2021	Australia's Sexiest Tradie	Smacker	6 episodes
2021	Back to the Rafters	Max Lipinski	1 episode
2020	Dom and Adrian	Pastor	TV Special
2019	The Commons	Carl Anderson	4 episodes
2019	The Letdown	"Ziggy"	2 episodes
2017	The Circle		Mini series
2016-2017	A Place to Call Home	Gareth Baines	3 episodes
2017	Wentworth	Mike Pennisi	2 episodes
2016	Here Come the Habibs	Lawrence	1 episode
2014	Black Comedy	Guest	1 episode
2013	The Elegant Gentleman's Guide to Knife Fighting	Guest	2 episodes
2013	Mr & Mrs Murder	Jim	1 episode
2012	Rake	Emily's Defence	1 episode
2012	Miss Fisher's Murder Mysteries	Guy Stanley	1 episode
2011	Underbelly	Phil Jeffs	5 episodes
2010-2011	Me and My Monsters	Nick	26 episodes
2006	Stupid, Stupid Man	Garry	1 episode
2006	Lost	Ian McVay	1 episode
2006	RAN Remote Area Nurse	John Bourke	4 episodes
2004	Blue Heelers	Michael Stakis	1 episode
2003	Home and Away	David Callahan	1 episode
2000	Farscape	Prince Clavor	3 episodes
1999	Dog's Head Bay	Bogdan	1 episode
1998	A Difficult Woman	Murray	3 episodes
1998	Murder Call	Martin	1 episode
1998	Wildside	Justin	1 episode
1997	Water Rats	Alberto	2 episodes
1993	Police Rescue	Wallis	1 episode
1992	A Country Practice	Max Blair	

=== Production Credits ===
Year	Title	Role	Notes
2022-2020	Grey Nomads	Writer / Director	12 episodes
2020	Occupation: Rainfall	Additional Dialogue	
2018	Occupation	Additional Dialogue	
2017	The Circle	Writer / Director	
