= Hayley Warner =

Australian-born singer-songwriter (born 1992)

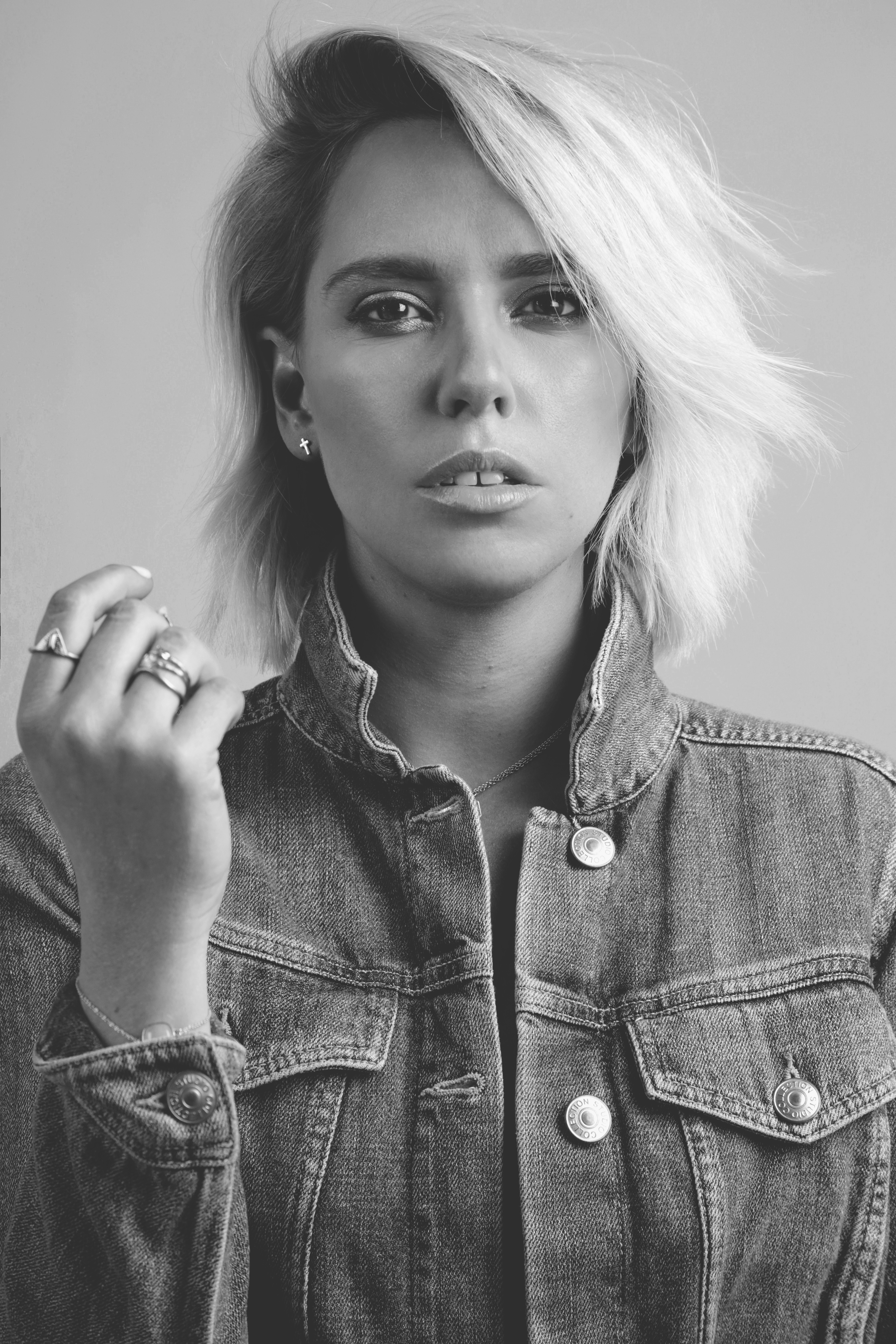
- Warner in 2015

Background information
- Born: 23 January 1992 (age 34)
- Origin: Sydney, Australia
- Genre: Singer-songwriter
- Occupation: Singer-songwriter,
- Instruments: Vocals, guitar, piano, drums
- Years active: 2009–present
- Website: hayleywarner.com

Hayley Warner (born 23 January 1992) is an Australian singer-songwriter. In 2009, she finished as runner-up in the seventh and final Australian Idol, and was noted for her high-energy performances and vast vocal range. In 2013, The Daily Telegraph named Warner one of Australia's most accomplished songwriters. Warner's songwriting credits total over 11 times platinum in worldwide sales. Hayley co-wrote Grammy nominated artist Tori Kelly's single "Hollow", which was released 3 November 2015. After moving to Los Angeles, Warner signed a worldwide publishing deal with Warner/Chappell Music in 2015.

== Life and career ==
=== Early life ===
As a young child, Warner was incredibly passionate about sports and set her sights on becoming the best, but at the age of seven, she was diagnosed with Legg–Calvé–Perthes disease which stripped her of her sporting dreams and forced her to learn to walk again. Through her struggle, music quickly became her therapy and true calling. When she was just twelve years old she started her first band, Cloud 9. From the ages of twelve to sixteen, she performed at 500 different venues around Australia.

=== 2009–2022: Australian Idol & songwriting ===
In 2009, Warner auditioned for and ultimately placed second on the seventh season of Australian Idol.

Warner signed to Sony Music immediately after finale, and released her debut "Good Day" in December 2009. The song peaked at No. 11 on the ARIA Singles Chart and was certified gold. This was followed by "Hands Off" single and EP.

In 2012, she signed a worldwide publishing deal with Sony ATV and began collaborating with songwriter and producers all around the world.

Warner co-wrote "Good Night" which was chosen by Sony Records to be the first single for The X Factor Australia season 3 winner Reece Mastin. "Good Night" reached No. 1 in both Australia and New Zealand, and achieved 5 times Platinum accreditation in Australia and Platinum sales in New Zealand. "Good Night" is the fastest selling digital single by an artist signed to Sony Music Australia in history. She then teamed up with Mastin and co-wrote his second single "Shut Up & Kiss Me" which reached No. 2 on the ARIA Singles Chart and achieved platinum sales in Australia and No. 1 with Gold sales in New Zealand. She also co-wrote "Set Me on Fire" which was chosen for season 4 contestant Bella Ferraro. The single was released in December 2012, and debuted at No. 36 on the ARIA Singles Chart. She co-wrote "Freedom" for artist Stan Walker that was selected for a three-year TV advertising campaign for The Salvation Army in Australia and New Zealand. She co-wrote with Tina Arena for her ninth studio album Reset. The album was released in October 2013, and spent 18 weeks in the ARIA Top 50 including debuting No. 4. Her co-written single "Still Running" was translated to French for the European release of the album. Her song, "Once" was recorded by Angy for her 2013 album Drama Queen. In 2013, she co-wrote the two runner-up singles for X Factor Australia contestants Taylor Henderson and Jai Waetford. Henderson's single "Borrow My Heart" debuted at No. 1 and has achieved double Platinum accreditation. Waetford's single "Your Eyes" debuted at No. 6 and has achieved Gold sales. She also co-wrote Henderson's second single "When You Were Mine" which debuted No. 5 and achieved Platinum sales. She co-wrote four tracks on his second studio album Burnt Letters, which debuted at No. 1 on the ARIA Album Charts, achieved Gold status within a week of its release, and is now certified Platinum. The album's fifth single "Brighter Days" is now being used as the theme song for the highest rated national morning TV show in Australia, Sunrise. In 2014, she co-wrote "Stand by You" which was selected as the single for X Factor Australia season 6 winner Marlisa Punzalan. The track debuted at No. 2 on the ARIA Singles Chart and is currently double Platinum. The track also reached No. 7 in Singapore and No. 21 in New Zealand.

In 2015, Warner was an APRA Music Awards Nominee for Pop Work of the Year and was selected for the exclusive APRA AMCOS SongHubs in Los Angeles.

After penning multiple hits for various artists around the world, Warner found it vital to find her own voice and write about the stories of her own life. In 2015, she released "Closure".

=== 2022–present:I Think I Saw the Moon ===
In April 2024, Warner released the EP I Think I Saw the Moon. It featured five singles released between 2022 and 2024. The EP was made at Warner's house with her friend Tom Jordan. Warner said "As the EP evolved, we wrote all those songs in a row and never wrote anything else. It was only those five songs. Our strike rate was insane, and we knew we were on to something."

== Discography ==
Hayley Warner discography
- Extended plays: 3
- Singles: 9

=== Extended plays ===
Title	Details
Hands Off	Released: August 2010; Format: CD, digital; Label: Sony Music Australia
I Think I Saw the Moon	Released: April 2024; Format: digital; Label: Hayley Warner
Songs That Made Me	Released: 27 June 2025; Format: digital; Label: Hart Records

=== Singles ===
Year	Title	Chart position	Certifications	Album
Year	Title	AUS	Certifications	Album
2009	"Good Day"	11	ARIA: Gold	Non-album single
2010	"Hands Off"	—		Hands Off EP
2011	"Best Thing"	—		Non-album singles
2015	"Closure"	—		Non-album singles
2022	"You Were Once"	—		I Think I Saw the Moon
2023	"Break Ups Ain't Goodbye"	—		I Think I Saw the Moon
2023	"Brother"	—		I Think I Saw the Moon
2023	"I Think I Saw the Moon"	—		I Think I Saw the Moon
2024	"Do You Think About Me?"	—		I Think I Saw the Moon

=== Songwriting credits ===
Year	Artist	Song
2011	Reece Mastin	"Good Night"
2011	Reece Mastin	"Shut Up & Kiss Me"
2012	Bella Ferraro	"Set Me on Fire"
2012	Stan Walker	"Freedom"
2013	Tina Arena	"Still Running"
2013	Angy	"Once"
2014	Taylor Henderson	"Borrow My Heart"
2014	Taylor Henderson	"When You Were Mine"
2014	Taylor Henderson	"Sail Away"
2014	Taylor Henderson	"Piece By Piece"
2014	Jai Waetford	"Your Eyes"
2014	Dami Im	"Without You"
2014	Marlisa Punzalan	"Stand by You"
2015	Reigan Derry	"Feels Like Heaven"
2015	Tina Arena	"I Want To Love You"
2015	Tina Arena	"Overload"
2015	Tina Arena	"Magic"
2015	Tina Arena	"Wouldn't Be Love If It Didn't"
2015	Tina Arena	"Lie in It"
2015	Tina Arena	"Heaven"
2015	Tori Kelly	"Hollow"
2016	JoJo	"Music"
2016	JoJo	"I Can Only"
2016	JoJo	"FAB"
2016	JoJo	"Honest"
2016	JoJo	"Edibles"
2016	JoJo	"Rise Up"
2017	Nickelback	"Song on Fire"
2019	Maelyn Jarmon	"Wait for You"
2019	Katy Perry	"Never Really Over"
2021	Kelly Clarkson	"Glow"
2021	Pentatonix	"Easy Love"
2022	Calum Scott	"Heaven"
2022	Calum Scott	"If You Ever Change Your Mind"
2026	Jamie Miller	"Babydoll"

== Awards and nominations ==
=== APRA Awards ===
The APRA Awards are held in Australia and New Zealand by the Australasian Performing Right Association to recognise songwriting skills, sales and airplay performance by its members annually.

Year	Nominee / work	Award	Result	Ref.
2015	"Borrow My Heart" (by Taylor Henderson) (co-written by Jensen)	Pop Work of the Year	Nominated	
2020	"Never Really Over" (by Katy Perry) (co-written by Jensen)	Most Performed Pop Work	Nominated	

=== International Songwriting Competition ===
The International Songwriting Competition s an annual songwriting contest for both amateur and professional songwriters.

Year	Nominee / work	Award	Result	Ref.
2024	"Brother"	Folk Singer-songwriter	Won	
