= Occupation (2018 film) =

- Theatrical film poster
- Directed by: Luke Sparke
- Written by: Luke Sparke
- Additional dialogue by: Felix Williamson
- Produced by: Carly Imrie; Carmel Imrie
- Starring: Dan Ewing; Temuera Morrison; Stephanie Jacobsen; Rhiannon Fish; Zachary Garred; Izzy Stevens; Charles Terrier; Charles Mesure; Trystan Go; Erin Connor; Felix Williamson; Jacqueline McKenzie; Aaron Jeffery; Bruce Spence
- Cinematography: Tony O'Loughlan
- Edited by: David Napier
- Music by: Christopher Elves
- Production company: SparkeFilms
- Distributed by: Pinnacle Films
- Release dates: 25 May 2018 (Monster Fest); 12 July 2018 (Australia)
- Running time: 119 minutes
- Country: Australia
- Language: English
- Budget: $6 million
- Box office: $21,704

Occupation is a 2018 Australian science fiction action film, directed and written by Luke Sparke, with additional dialogue by Felix Williamson. The film was produced by Carly and Carmel Imrie, of SparkeFilms.

In February 2018, Saban Entertainment acquired rights to the film in the North American region. Pinnacle Film is responsible for the film's release in Australia and New Zealand. A sequel, Occupation: Rainfall, was released in 2020.

== Plot ==
A group of Australians form a resistance force after their small Australian country town is enslaved and occupied by an extraterrestrial force. Together they form the human rebellion in a battle for the survival of their group. They progressively find more members to join and form a small community in the Australian bush. Finally, they team up with the Australian Army from the Australian Defence Force remnant for the final conflict that will have a drastic impact on not only humanity itself but the whole planet Earth.

== Cast ==
- Dan Ewing as Matt Simmons
- Temuera Morrison as Peter Bartlett
- Rhiannon Fish as Vanessa
- Stephanie Jacobsen as Amelia Chambers
- Trystan Go as Marcus Chambers
- Zachary Garred as Dennis
- Felix Williamson as Seth
- Izzy Stevens as Bella Bartlett
- Charles Mesure as Arnold
- Charles Terrier as Jackson
- Jacqueline McKenzie as Colonel Grant
- Aaron Jeffery as Major Davis
- Erin Connor as Jenny Bartlett
- Bruce Spence as Alien Leader
- Rhylan Bush as Samuel Bartlett
- Roy Billing as Town Mayor
- Luke Sparke as Helicopter Pilot
- Ketrina Risteska as Chloe
- Zac Garred as Dennis
- Craig Ingham as Bill
- Melissa Bell as Mrs Kyle
- Mikaela Bradshaw as a Civilian
- Trystan Go as Marcus Chambers
- Oscar Balley as a Captured Slave

== Production ==
=== Development ===
Occupation had a reported budget of $6 million raised by Luke Sparke through private investors. The film was written, cast, and financed in six months. It was cast by the producers, who negotiated the roles with each individual agent in order to keep the film as universal as possible.

=== Filming and locations ===
The six-week shoot took place between May 2017 to July 2017, with locations on Queensland's Gold Coast and in northern New South Wales. The film employed over 150 locals as extras for the scenes involving the Australian rules match between the Kookaburras and the Drop Bears at Murwillumbah Showgrounds.

== Release ==
Occupation had its world premiere at the Ritz Cinema in Randwick, New South Wales on 10 July 2018. It was then released Australia-wide on 12 July. The film was released in the United States on 20 July 2018.

== Reception ==
=== Box office ===
The film made a box office of $35,111 in Australia and New Zealand and had estimated North American DVD/Blu-ray sales of $893,000.

=== Critical response ===
On review aggregator Rotten Tomatoes, the film has an approval rating of 48%, based on 21 reviews with an average rating of 5.1/10.

Justin Lowe of The Hollywood Reporter wrote: "Occupation gets the job done with a minimum of fuss and an abundance of explosive set pieces that will likely endear it to domestic fans, even if it's mostly forgettable otherwise." Noel Murray of the Los Angeles Times wrote: "This is the rare action movie that's almost more exciting when the characters put down their guns and take up an argument."

== Sequel ==
A sequel entitled Occupation: Rainfall was released on January 28, 2021, with Dan Ewing and Temuera Morrison returning and Daniel Gillies and Ken Jeong joining the cast. In September 2020, it was announced that Jason Isaacs had joined the cast of the sequel, which was in post-production at the time of the news.
