= Timeless (Reece Mastin song) =

Single by Reece Mastin

from the album Beautiful Nightmare
- Released: 1 March 2013
- Recorded: Studios 301 and Sony Studios, Sydney
- Genre: Pop
- Length: 3:56
- Label: Sony
- Songwriter(s): Reece Mastin; Anthony Egizii; David Musumeci
- Producer(s): DNA

Reece Mastin singles chronology
"Rock Star" (2012)	"Timeless" (2013)	"Girls (All Around the World)" (2013)

"Timeless" is a song by British-Australian recording artist Reece Mastin, taken from his second studio album, Beautiful Nightmare (2012). It was released as a digital download on 1 March 2013, as the fourth single from the album. The song peaked at number 85 on the ARIA Singles Chart. "Timeless" was written by Mastin, Anthony Egizii and David Musumeci, and produced by the latter two under their production name DNA.

== Music video ==
A music video to accompany the release of "Timeless" was first released onto YouTube on 15 February 2013 at a total length of three minutes and fifty-four seconds.

== Track listing ==
Digital download
No.	Title	Length
1.	"Timeless" (Radio Edit)	3:55
2.	"Timeless" (Acoustic)	4:52

== Credits and personnel ==
Credits adapted from the liner notes of Beautiful Nightmare.

Locations

- Recorded at Studios 301 and Sony Studios in Sydney.
- Mastered at Studios 301 in Sydney.

Personnel

- Songwriting – Reece Mastin, Anthony Egizii, David Musumeci
- Production – DNA
- Mixing – Anthony Egizii
- Programming and keys – Anthony Egizii
- Guitars – David Musumeci
- Additional acoustic guitars – Carl Dimataga
- Mastering – Leon Zervos

== Charts ==
Chart (2013)	Peak position
Australia (ARIA)	85

== Release history ==
Region	Date	Format	Label
Australia	1 March 2013	Digital download	Sony Music Australia
