= Songs on My Sleeve =

Studio album by Caitlyn Shadbolt
- Released: 26 May 2017
- Genre: Country; pop
- Length: 40:45
- Label: ABC Music; Universal Music Australia
- Producer: Andrew Cochrane

Caitlyn Shadbolt chronology
Caitlyn Shadbolt (2015)	Songs on My Sleeve (2017)

Songs on My Sleeve is the debut studio album by Australian singer Caitlyn Shadbolt. The album was announced on 17 March 2017, alongside the lead single "My Breakup Anthem". The album was released on 26 May 2017.

Shadbolt explained the title, saying "I decided to call this album Songs on My Sleeve because I have co-written every track. And as a songwriter, each song starts from something personal. When I listen to this album now, it's like I'm going back through my diary and reading all the memories and moments over the last two years."

== Track listing ==
No.	Title	Writer(s)	Length
1.	"My Breakup Anthem"	Caitlyn Shadbolt; Jared Porter	3:11
2.	"Jealousy"	Shadbolt; Adam Eckersley; Brooke McClymont	3:00
3.	"Bad"	Shadbolt; Danielle Blakey; Emily Shackleton	2:50
4.	"Get to Me"	Shadbolt; Lindsay Jackson; Jay O'Shea	3:07
5.	"Not Your Only"	Shadbolt; McClymont	4:25
6.	"Me Without You" (featuring Reece Mastin)	Shadbolt; Phil Barton; Morgan Evans	3:28
7.	"Dirty"	Shadbolt; Lindsay Jackson; Liz Rose; Kylie Sackley	3:00
8.	"Wasting Time with You"	Shadbolt; Eckersley; McClymont	3:27
9.	"Cloud 10"	Shadbolt; John Alaiga; Surahn Sidu	3:13
10.	"My Friends & I"	Shadbolt; Fiona Bevan; Mark Landon	3:20
11.	"Suddenly"	Shadbolt; Eckersley; McClymont	2:52
12.	"All of You"	Shadbolt; Matt Smith	3:52

== Charts ==
Chart (2017)	Peak position
Australian Albums (ARIA)	26

== Release history ==
Region	Date	Format	Edition(s)	Label	Catalogue
Australia	26 May 2017	CD; digital download	Standard	ABC Music / Universal Music Australia	5757158
