= Caitlyn Shadbolt =

Australian singer and songwriter (born 1995)

- Born: 4 October 1995 (age 31) Gympie, Queensland
- Genre: Country
- Occupations: Singer; songwriter
- Instrument: Vocals
- Years active: 2014–present
- Label: ABC Music
- Website: caitlynshadbolt.com

Caitlyn Shadbolt is an Australian singer and songwriter. Shadbolt rose to fame after being the ninth contestant eliminated on the sixth season of The X Factor Australia. She released her debut extended play in 2015, which peaked at number 50.

== Career ==
Shadbolt started playing in a band at the age of 12.

=== 2014: The X Factor Australia ===
In 2014, Shadbolt successfully auditioned for the sixth season of The X Factor Australia singing "Life Is a Highway" by Tom Cochrane. She made it through to the live shows and was mentored by Ronan Keating.

Show	Theme	Song	Original artist(s)	Order	Result
Audition	Free choice	"Life Is a Highway"	Tom Cochrane	N/A	Through to super bootcamp
Super bootcamp 1	Group performance	Unknown	Unknown	N/A	Through to super bootcamp 2
Super bootcamp 2	Solo performance	"Brave"	Sara Bareilles	N/A	Through to home visits
Home visits	Free choice	"Skyscraper"	Demi Lovato	N/A	Through to live shows
Week 1	Judges' Choice	"Days Go By"	Keith Urban	10	Safe
Week 2	Legends	"Blaze of Glory"	Jon Bon Jovi	9	Safe
Week 3	Decades Challenge	"Is She Really Going Out with Him?"	Joe Jackson	2	Safe
Week 4	Top 10 Hits	"Shake It Off"	Taylor Swift	10	Safe
Week 5	Latest and Greatest	"You and I"	Lady Gaga	7	Safe (6th)
Week 6	Rock	"Closer to the Edge"	Thirty Seconds to Mars	6	Bottom two (7th)
Week 6	Final showdown	"Before the Worst"	The Script	1	Saved via deadlock
Week 7	Judges' Challenge	"Still Into You"	Paramore	5	Bottom three (5th/6th)
Week 7	Final showdown	"Temporary Home"	Carrie Underwood	1	Saved via deadlock
Week 8	Aussie Week	"Bow River"	Cold Chisel	2	Safe
Week 9	Killer Tracks and Curveballs	"Before He Cheats"	Carrie Underwood	5	Bottom two
Week 9	Killer Tracks and Curveballs	"Will You Love Me Tomorrow"	The Shirelles	10	Bottom two
Week 9	Final showdown	"If I Die Young"	The Band Perry	1	Eliminated

denotes week in the bottom two/three.
denotes being eliminated.

=== 2015–2016: Debut EP ===
In January 2015, Shadbolt released her debut single, "Maps Out The Window" which shot straight to the top of the iTunes Country Singles Chart and reached the Top 5 on the Australian Country Airplay Chart. In July, Shadbolt signed with ABC Music and released her second single, "Shoot Out The Lights". Her self-titled debut EP was released in August 2015 and peaked at number 50.

In 2016, Shadbolt was nominated for "Best New Artist" Country Music Awards, losing to Chrissie Lamb. In March 2016, Shadbolt won New Oz Artist of the Year at the Country Music Channel Awards.

=== 2017–2019: Songs on My Sleeve ===
In March 2017, Shadbolt released "My Break Up Anthem" as the lead single from her debut studio album Songs on My Sleeve released in May 2017.

=== 2020: Stages ===
In January 2020, Shadbolt released a new single titled "Bones". Upon release, Shadbolt said "'Bones' is about chasing the dream. It's a song about persistence, passion and trusting your gut instinct. There are always so many hurdles that come with dreaming big, but when you love something enough, you'll do it regardless. It couldn't speak more truth for me." Singles "Porcelain" and "Edge of the Earth" followed with Shadbolt's second studio album, Stages set for release in November 2020.

=== 2021-present: Bloom & Surrender ===
On 26 August 2022, Shadbolt released "Lost On Me", the lead single from her forthcoming third studio album.

In April 2023, Shadbolt announced the release of her third studio album, Bloom & Surrender, set for release on 9 June 2023.

== Discography ==
=== Studio albums ===
List of Studio albums
Title	Album details	Peak chart positions
Title	Album details	AUS
Songs on My Sleeve	Released: 26 May 2017; Label: Caitlyn Shadbolt / ABC Music (5757158); Formats: CD, digital download	26
Stages	Released: 6 November 2020; Label: Caitlyn Shadbolt / ABC Music (0743564); Formats: CD, digital download, Media streaming	–
Bloom & Surrender	Scheduled: 9 June 2023; Label: ABC Music (ABCC0026); Formats: CD, digital download, streaming	–

=== Extended plays ===
List of extended plays
Title	Album details	Peak chart positions
Title	Album details	AUS
Caitlyn Shadbolt	Released: 21 August 2015 (Australia); Label: Caitlyn Shadbolt / ABC Music; Formats: CD, digital download	50

=== Singles ===
List of singles
Title	Year	Album
"Maps Out the Window"	2015	Caitlyn Shadbolt
"Shoot Out the Lights"	2015	Caitlyn Shadbolt
"Pushing Through"	2015	Caitlyn Shadbolt
"My Breakup Anthem"	2017	Songs on My Sleeve
"Bad"	2017	Songs on My Sleeve
"Me Without You" (with Reece Mastin)	2018	Songs on My Sleeve
"Bones"	2020	Stages
"Porcelain"	2020	Stages
"Edge of the Earth"	2020	Stages
"Two Lost Lovers"	2020	Stages
"Oxygen"	2021	Stages
"Dumb Decisions" (with Melanie Dyer)	2022	Bloom & Surrender
"Lost On Me"	2022	Bloom & Surrender
"Monsters"	2023	Bloom & Surrender

== Awards and nominations ==
=== AIR Awards ===
The Australian Independent Record Awards (commonly known informally as AIR Awards) is an annual awards night to recognise, promote and celebrate the success of Australia's Independent Music sector.

Year	Nominee / work	Award	Result
2018	Songs On My Sleeve	Best Independent Country Album	Nominated

=== Country Music Awards of Australia ===
The Country Music Awards of Australia is an annual awards night held in January during the Tamworth Country Music Festival. Celebrating recording excellence in the Australian country music industry. They commenced in 1973.

Year	Nominee / work	Award	Result	Ref.
2016	Caitlyn Shadbolt	New Talent of the Year	Nominated	
2017	(unknown)	(unknown)	Nominated	
2023	"Dumb Decisions" (with Melanie Dyer)	Vocal Collaboration of the Year	Nominated	

=== Country Music Channel (CMC) ===
Year	Nominee / work	Award	Result
2016	Herself	New Oz Artist of the Year	Won
2017	Herself	Female Oz Artist of the Year	Nominated

== See also ==
- The X Factor (Australia season 6)
- List of The X Factor finalists (Australia season 6)
