= Occupation: Rainfall =

Science fiction action film

- Release poster
- Directed by: Luke Sparke
- Written by: Luke Sparke
- Additional dialogue by: Dale Dye; Felix Williamson
- Produced by: Carly Imrie; Carmel Imrie
- Starring: Dan Ewing; Temuera Morrison; Daniel Gillies; Lawrence Makoare; Mark Coles Smith; Jet Tranter; Jason Isaacs; Ken Jeong
- Cinematography: Wade Muller
- Edited by: Luke Sparke
- Music by: Frederik Wiedmann
- Production companies: Saban Films; SparkeFilms; Film Mode Entertainment; Monster Pictures
- Distributed by: Monster Pictures
- Release dates: 30 October 2020 (Monster Fest); 28 January 2021 (Australia)
- Running time: 128 minutes
- Country: Australia
- Language: English
- Budget: A$25 million

Occupation: Rainfall is a 2020 Australian science fiction action film written and directed by Luke Sparke. It is a sequel to the 2018 film Occupation.

== Plot ==
2 years after the alien invasion and occupation, the human resistance in Sydney, Australia learns about an alien operation called "Rainfall" related to a location, Pine Gap. No details are known but a team of three, including one Alien defector, sets out to learn more. The human resistance in Sydney is attacked and destroyed, along with Sydney itself. Survivors flee to a military mountain base but it too is attacked and destroyed. The recon team arrives at Pine Gap which turns out to be a US intelligence base hosting two goofy survivors despite being destroyed on the surface. "Rainfall" is an artificial asteroid of sorts hidden below the base and created by the aliens, with potential high tech capabilities. A hasty plan to destroy the asteroid is made but to no avail, the asteroid falls in the hands of attacking aliens.

== Cast ==
- Dan Ewing as Matt Simmons
- Jet Tranter as Amelia Chambers
- Temuera Morrison as Peter Bartlett
- Daniel Gillies as Wing Commander Hayes
- Lawrence Makoare as Gary the Alien
  - Brad McMurray as Gary the Alien (additional suit actor)
- Mark Coles Smith as Captain Wessex
- Ben Chisholm as Steve
  - Jason Isaacs as Steve (voice)
- Ken Jeong as Bud Miller
- Erin Connor as Jenny Bartlett
- Trystan Go as Marcus Chambers
- Izzy Stevens as Isabella Bartlett
- David Roberts as Abraham
- Vince Colosimo as Jacob
- Katrina Risteska as Suarez
- Felix Williamson

== Production ==
On 17 September 2020, it was announced that Jason Isaacs had joined the cast of Occupation: Rainfall. On the same day, it was announced that the film was in post-production, with visual effects being worked on by artists behind Star Wars: The Last Jedi.

It was filmed in Australia at the Gold Coast in Queensland and northern New South Wales.

== Home media ==
The film made its SVOD debut on Netflix in the United States on 9 October 2021.

== Reception ==
On the review aggregator website Rotten Tomatoes, 60% of 25 critics' reviews are positive, with an average rating of 6.0/10. Metacritic, which uses a weighted average, assigned the film a score of 45 out of 100, based on 4 critics, indicating "mixed or average" reviews.

== Sequel ==
Luke Sparke is working in active development of Rainfall Chapter 2.
