= Caitlyn Shadbolt (EP) =

2015 record by Caitlyn Shadbolt

EP by Caitlyn Shadbolt
- Released: 21 August 2015
- Genre: Country, pop
- Length: 21:31
- Label: ABC Music, Universal Music Australia

Caitlyn Shadbolt chronology
Caitlyn Shadbolt (2015)	Songs on My Sleeve (2017)

Caitlyn Shadbolt is the debut extended play by Australian recording artist Caitlyn Shadbolt. The album was released on 21 August 2015.

== Track listing ==
No.	Title	Length
1.	"Shoot Out the Lights"	3:28
2.	"Pushing Through"	3:39
3.	"Running in Circles"	4:22
4.	"Maps Out the Window"	3:05
5.	"Right Kind of Wrong"	3:44
6.	"Angel Time"	3:13
Total length:		21:31

== Charts ==
Chart (2017)	Peak position
Australian Albums (ARIA)	50

== Release history ==
Region	Date	Format	Edition(s)	Label	Catalogue
Australia	21 August 2015	CD; digital download	Standard	ABC Music / Universal Music Australia	4748036
