= Shut Up & Kiss Me =

2012 single by Reece Mastin

Single by Reece Mastin

from the album Beautiful Nightmare
- Released: 20 April 2012
- Recorded: 2012
- Genre: Pop punk
- Length: 3:21
- Label: Sony
- Songwriters: Reece Mastin; Anthony Egizii; David Musumeci; Hayley Warner
- Producer: DNA

Reece Mastin singles chronology
| "Good Night" (2011) | "Shut Up & Kiss Me" (2012) | "Shout It Out" (2012) |

"Shut Up & Kiss Me" is a song by British-Australian recording artist Reece Mastin, taken from his second studio album, Beautiful Nightmare (2012). It was released digitally and physically on 20 April 2012, as the lead single from the album. The song was written by Hayley Warner and Mastin with Anthony Egizii and David Musumeci of the production duo DNA, who also produced the song. Musically, "Shut Up & Kiss Me" is an upbeat song with pop punk influences, and lyrics about "making out with a girl".

The song charted in Australia and New Zealand at numbers two and one, respectively. It was certified platinum by the Australian Recording Industry Association (ARIA), and gold by the Recording Industry Association of New Zealand (RIANZ). The accompanying music video features Mastin hanging out with friends in a warehouse which turns out to be an amusement park. Mastin performed "Shut Up & Kiss Me" on Dancing with the Stars and Sunrise.

== Background ==
"Shut Up & Kiss Me" was written and produced by Anthony Egizii and David Musumeci of DNA. Hayley Warner and Reece Mastin also co-wrote the song. The song's cover art was posted on Mastin's Facebook page on 3 April 2012. On 10 April 2012, Mastin released a preview of "Shut Up & Kiss Me" on his Facebook page with the following caption: "Here's a preview of my brand new single 'Shut Up & Kiss Me' with a behind-the-scenes peek of a photoshoot I did – 10 days lil rockers". "Shut Up & Kiss Me" was sent to Australian radio on 17 April 2012. It was later released digitally and physically on 20 April 2012. Musically, "Shut Up & Kiss Me" is an upbeat song with pop punk influences, and lyrics about "making out with a girl". In an interview with MTV Australia, Mastin said the song is "just a tongue-in-cheek, muck around [type of] song".

== Reception ==
A writer for Take 40 Australia wrote that "Shut Up & Kiss Me" sounds "just as fun as his debut [single] 'Good Night', but shows a more mature side of Reece". Staff members of The Hot Hits viewed the song as a "guaranteed hit". On 30 April 2012, "Shut Up & Kiss Me" debuted and peaked at number two on the ARIA Singles Chart. It was certified platinum by the Australian Recording Industry Association (ARIA), denoting sales of 70,000 copies. On the New Zealand Singles Chart, the song debuted at number one and became Mastin's second consecutive number-one single in the country. It was certified gold by the Recording Industry Association of New Zealand (RIANZ), denoting sales of 7,500 copies.

== Music video and live performances ==
The accompanying music video for "Shut Up & Kiss Me" premiered on Vevo at midnight on 17 April 2012. The video begins with Mastin and his friends walking to a warehouse. As the song starts to play, Mastin is seen opening the door and leads his friends inside the warehouse which turns out to be an amusement park. He is then seen performing the song with his band, singing it to his girlfriend, played by Arielle Panta. The video then shows Mastin's friend texting people who later arrive at the amusement park. Australia's Next Top Model's Jess Bush also makes a cameo appearance in the video.

Mastin first performed "Shut Up & Kiss Me" during his concert at TSB Bank Arena in Wellington, New Zealand on 12 April 2012. On 20 April 2012, he performed the song during an instore appearance at Westfield Tuggerah. Mastin also performed "Shut Up & Kiss Me" on Dancing with the Stars (Australia) on 22 April 2012, and on Sunrise on 1 May 2012.

== Track listing ==
- CD single / digital download
1. "Shut Up & Kiss Me" – 3:21

== Credits and personnel ==
Credits adapted from the liner notes of Beautiful Nightmare.

Locations

- Guitars engineering recorded at Sony Studios in Sydney.
- Drums and bass engineering recorded at Studios 301 in Sydney.
- Mastered at Studios 301 in Sydney.

Personnel

- Songwriting – Reece Mastin, Anthony Egizii, David Musumeci, Hayley Warner
- Production – DNA
- Mixing – Chris Lord-Alge
- Guitars engineering – Mike Morgan
- Drums and bass engineering – Anton Hagop
- Backing vocals – Reece Mastin, David Musumeci
- Programming and keys – Anthony Egizii
- Guitars and bass – Ben Rodgers
- Drums – Nathan Tuffin
- Mastering – Leon Zervos

== Charts and certifications ==
=== Weekly charts ===
| Chart (2012) | Peak position |
|---|---|
| Australia (ARIA) | 2 |
| New Zealand (Recorded Music NZ) | 1 |

=== Year-end chart ===
| Chart (2012) | Position |
|---|---|
| Australian Artist (ARIA) | 17 |

=== Certifications ===
| Country | Provider | Certifications |
|---|---|---|
| Australia | ARIA | Platinum |
| New Zealand | RIANZ | Gold |

== Release history ==
| Region | Date | Format | Label | Catalogue |
|---|---|---|---|---|
| Australia | 20 April 2012 | CD single | Sony Music Australia | 88691975692 |
| Australia | 20 April 2012 | Digital download | Sony Music Australia | —N/a |
