= Girls (All Around the World) =

Single by Reece Mastin
- Released: 25 October 2013
- Recorded: 2013
- Genre: Pop
- Length: 3:17
- Label: Sony
- Songwriter(s): Reece Mastin; Rune Westberg; Brian Howes
- Producer(s): Rune Westberg

Reece Mastin singles chronology
| "Timeless" (2013) | "Girls (All Around the World)" (2013) | "Rebel and the Reason" (2015) |

"Girls (All Around the World)" is a song by British-Australian recording artist Reece Mastin. It was released as a digital download on 25 October 2013. The song peaked at number 59 on the ARIA Singles Chart. "Girls (All Around the World)" was written by Mastin, Rune Westberg, Brian Howes and was produced by Rune Westberg.

== Music video ==
A music video to accompany the release of "Girls (All Around the World)" was first released onto YouTube on 24 October 2013 at a total length of three minutes and nineteen seconds.

== Track listing ==
Digital download
| No. | Title | Length |
|---|---|---|
| 1. | "Girls (All Around the World)" | 3:17 |

== Chart performance ==
| Chart (2013) | Peak position |
|---|---|
| Australia (ARIA) | 59 |

== Release history ==
| Region | Date | Format | Label |
|---|---|---|---|
| Australia | 25 October 2013 | Digital download | Sony Music Australia |
