= Rebel and the Reason (EP) =

EP by Reece Mastin
- Released: 1 May 2015
- Recorded: 2014–15
- Genre: Pop
- Length: 17:24
- Label: Social Family Records
- Producer: Ben Rogers; Jean-Paul Fung; Reece Mastin

Reece Mastin chronology
Beautiful Nightmare (2012)	Rebel and the Reason (2015)	Change Colours (2015)

Singles from Rebel and the Reason
- 1. "Rebel and the Reason" Released: 27 March 2015

Rebel and the Reason is the first extended play (EP) by British-Australian recording artist Reece Mastin, released through Social Family Records on 1 May 2015. The five-track EP contains the single of the same name and four new tracks. The EP was described as ‘an edgier, rock-laden new sound’ lying dormant in Reece. Mastin said, "I can definitely say that this is completely 100% me and I couldn't be happier with how it's turned out."

== Release and reception ==
The EP was then released both digitally and physically on 1 May 2015.

Aneta Grulichova of TheMusic.com.au awarded Rebel and the Reason three-and-a-half stars out of five and said "Aussie rocker Reece Mastin is back and better than ever… replacing his chatty pop songs with a more mature indie-rock sound".

== Track listing ==
No.	Title	Writer(s)	Length
1.	"Rebel and the Reason"	Ben Rodgers, Jean-Paul Fung, Reece Mastin	3:34
2.	"Give It to Me Straight"	Michael Delorenzis, Michael Paynter, Reece Mastin	3:13
3.	"Keep on Walking"	Michael Delorenzis, Michael Paynter, Reece Mastin	2:49
4.	"NR2DIE"	Ben Rodgers, Gary Pinto, Reece Mastin	3:27
5.	"Sleep When You’re Dead"	Lindsay Rimes, Reece Mastin	4:21
Total length:			17:24

== Charts ==
Chart (2015)	Peak position
New Zealand Albums (RMNZ)	37

== Credits ==
- Backing vocals – Gary Pinto, Joel Cangy, Mitch Rodgers, Ruby Rodgers
- Backing vocals, percussion – Mahalia Barnes
- Drums – Warren Trout
- Guitar – Franco Raggatt
- Additional instrumentation, additional production – Ben Rodgers, Jean-Paul Fung, Mitch Rodgers
- Keyboards, bass, guitar – Ben Rodgers

== Release history ==
Region	Date	Format	Label	Catalogue
Australia	1 May 2015	CD; digital download	Social Family Records	SFR0032
