= Mike Morgan (producer) =

- Occupation: Music producer

Mike Morgan is an Australian record producer/engineer, most well known for his work with Kids in Glass Houses, McFly and Cameras.

Working out of Australia's prestigious Studios 301, Mike has engineered, mixed or produced a wide range of both Australian and international recording artists including Lady Gaga, Jason Derülo, John Frusciante (Red Hot Chili Peppers), Kanye West, Soulsavers, John Farnham, Jimmy Barnes, The Blackout, Sneaky Sound System, Sarah Blasko, The Vines, Bertie Blackman, Regurgitator, Jim Moginie (Midnight Oil), Mark Vincent, David Campbell, Tim Freedman, Little Birdy and Rose Tattoo amongst many others
