= Rhiannon Fish =

Canadian-born Australian actress (born 1991)

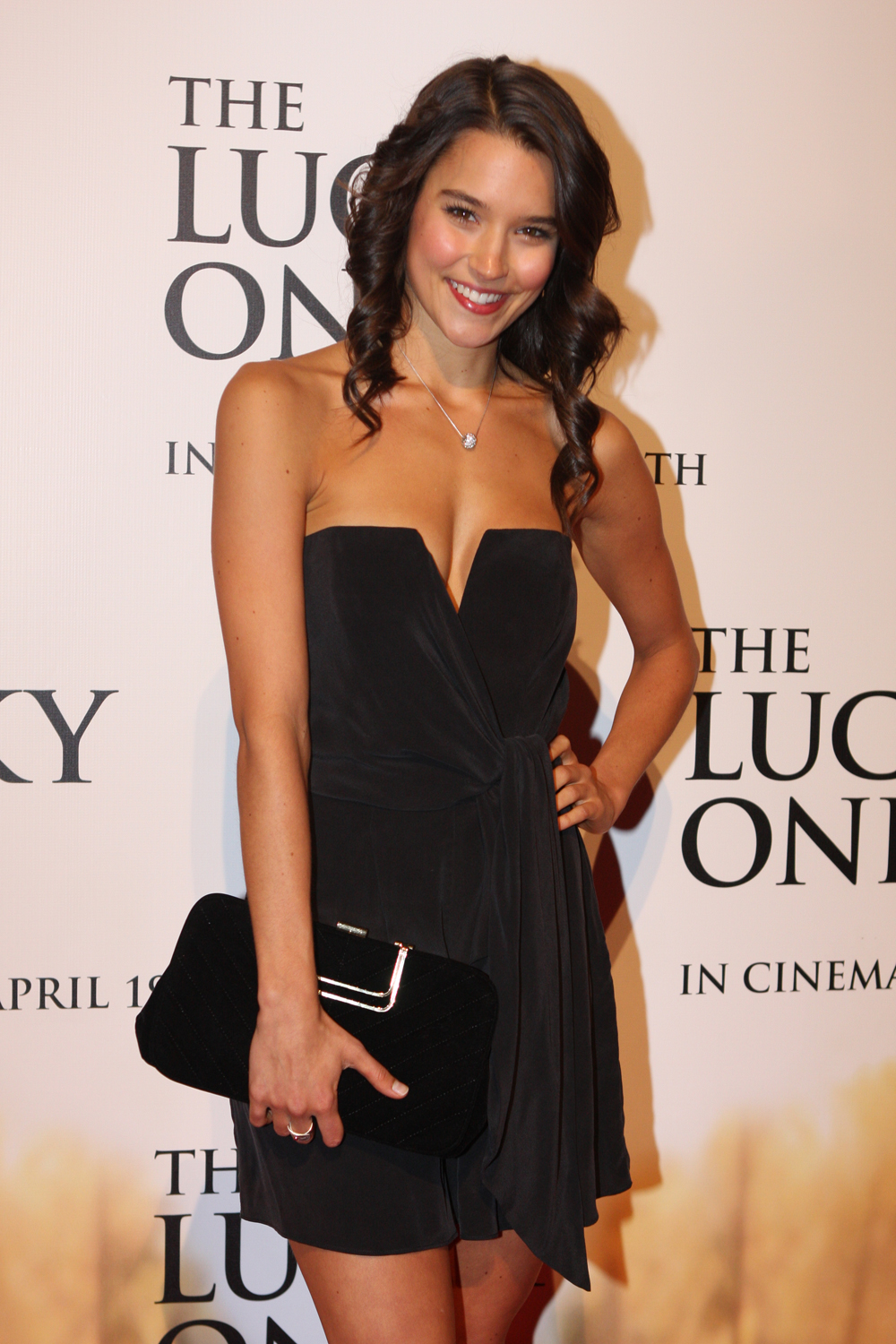
- Fish in April 2012
- Born: 14 March 1991 (age 35); Calgary, Alberta, Canada
- Occupation: Actress
- Years active: 2002–present

Rhiannon Fish (born 14 March 1991) is a Canadian-Australian actress. Her first screen acting role was Lisa Jeffries in the television soap opera Neighbours. She starred as Rocky in the Disney Channel show As the Bell Rings and as Laura in Playing for Charlie. From 2010 until 2013, she played April Scott on Home and Away. Fish took part in season 13 of Dancing with the Stars, and she joined the recurring cast of The 100 as Ontari in 2016.

== Early life ==
Fish was born on 14 March 1991 in Calgary, Alberta, Canada. Her family relocated to Melbourne when she was four years old. Her father was transferred to Russia for work when she was 12, but decided to keep the family in Australia. Fish attended the Camberwell Girls Grammar School and the Children's Performing Company of Australia, from which she graduated in 2008. Fish decided to pursue an acting career when she was eleven years old.

== Career ==
Fish first appeared on television at the age of eleven when she starred in Neighbours as Lisa Jeffries. She was later cast as Rocky in the Australian Disney Channel show As the Bell Rings. Fish had a guest role in Satisfaction and starred in the feature film Playing for Charlie in 2008. Fish received the role of April Scott in Home and Away in 2010. For her portrayal of April, Fish was included on the long list for the Most Popular New Talent Logie Award in 2011.

In 2012, Fish appeared in the music video for Reece Mastin's single "Shout It Out". After departing Home and Away in 2013, Fish participated in the 13th series of Dancing with the Stars, reaching second place behind Cosentino. In November 2015, Fish joined the cast of The 100 in the recurring role of Ontari. Fish appears in the 2018 sci-fi action film Occupation, alongside her former Home and Away co-star Dan Ewing. Fish appears in the 2021 Hallmark television film Signed, Sealed, Delivered: The Vows We Have Made, alongside Eric Mabius and Kristin Booth.

In 2022, Fish filmed the lead role in Adrian Powers and Caera Bradshaw's A Royal In Paradise, in which she plays a struggling romance writer who meets and falls in love with a prince (played by Mitchell Bourke) during a tropical getaway. The film was shot in Queensland. Fish also signed on to star in Jo-Anne Brechin's romantic film When Love Springs, alongside James O'Halloran. In October 2023, Fish filmed the romantic comedy He Loves Me Not opposite Lincoln Lewis in K'gari (Fraser Island) and Hervey Bay, Queensland. She stars alongside Daniel Lissing in Aussie at Heart, which will be broadcast on Hallmark in August 2026. Fish plays a former lawyer turned event planner, who is reunited with her rival, played by Lissing, to plan an anniversary event in Queensland.

== Filmography ==
=== Television ===
Year	Title	Role	Notes
2003–2005	Neighbours	Lisa Jeffries	Recurring role
2007–2009	As the Bell Rings	Rocky	14 episodes
2010	Satisfaction	Buffy	Episode: "Bug Crush"
2010–2013	Home and Away	April Scott	Series regular
2012	"Shout It Out"	Romantic interest	Music video
2016	The 100	Ontari	Recurring role
2020	You're Bacon Me Crazy	Laura	Television film (Hallmark)
2021	A Love to Remember	Tenley Sweeney	Television film
2021	Aurora Teagarden Mysteries: How to Con a Con	Melissa Needham	Television film (Hallmark)
2021	The 27-Hour Day	Ayla West	Television film (Hallmark)
2021	Journey of My Heart	Abby	Television film (Hallmark)
2021	Signed, Sealed, Delivered: The Vows We Have Made	Charley	Television film (Hallmark Mystery)
2022	For the Love of Chocolate	Aria Emerson	Television film
2022	A Splash of Love	Chloe Turner	Television film (Hallmark)
2022	Sweet as Pie	Tamara Hayes	Television film
2022	Nikki & Nora: Sister Sleuths	Nora	Television film (Hallmark Mystery)
2022	The Christmas Retreat	Kim Jones	Television film
2023	A Prince in Paradise	Olivia Perkins	Television film (Great American Family)
2023	A Picture of Her	Beth	Television film (Hallmark)
2023	Team Bride	Hannah	Television film
2023	When Love Springs	Rory	Television film (Hallmark)
2023	My Norwegian Holiday	Jessica Johnson “JJ”	Television film (Hallmark)
2023	Living with My Mother's Killer	Mara	Television film (Lifetime)
2024	Signed, Sealed, Delivered: A Tale of Three Letters	Charley	Television film (Hallmark Mystery)
2024	A Costa Rican Wedding	Emily	Television film (Hallmark)
2024	A Royal Proposal: A Prince in Paradise II	Olivia Perkins	Television film (Great American Family)
2025	Polar Opposites	Emma	Television Film (Hallmark)
2025	Signed, Sealed, Delivered: To The Moon And Back	Charley	Television Film (Hallmark Mystery)
2025	A Machu Picchu Proposal	Katie	Television Film (Hallmark)
2026	Aussie at Heart	Samara	Television Film (Hallmark)
2026	Who's Coming for Christmas	Julie Wilson	Television Film (Hallmark)

=== Film ===
Year	Title	Role	Notes
2024	He Loves Me Not	Holiday Merriwell	Film
2018	Occupation	Vanessa	Film
2008	Playing for Charlie	Laura	Film

Preceded by Danielle Spencer & Damian Whitewood	Dancing with the Stars (Australia) runner up Season 13 (2012 with Aric Yegudkin)	Succeeded by Lynne McGranger & Carmelo Pizzino
