= Suitcase of Stories =

EP by Mastin
- Released: 6 April 2018
- Genre: Rock
- Label: Mastin

Mastin chronology
Change Colours (2015)	Suitcase of Stories (2018)

Singles from Suitcase of Stories
- 1. "Not the Man for You" Released: 2 March 2018

Suitcase of Stories is the second extended play (EP) by British-Australian recording artist Reece Mastin, but first under the name Mastin. The EP was released on 6 April 2018. Speaking of the EP, Mastin said he had a number of songs "sitting around". He said “For this record, we sat down for a while and these just felt like the right five songs to go with. There's so many we've gone through and done demos for but these felt like they were a broad representation of what's been going on over the last two years. I was thinking about doing a full-length record but I thought to be able to get things out quicker and have some consistent flow of music coming out over the year.”

Upon release Mastin said “Not everyone will love this record, and I'm very okay with that, but for those who share the same taste as I do for the grand and world-changing genre of rock n roll, I wanted to make something special and long-lasting. I wanted to make something that can change your day, change your mindset, and make you feel like you can take on the world.”

The EP was supported by a Suitcase of Stories Tour.

== Reception ==
Silver Tiger Media said “The EP could not be further removed from Reece's previous releases. Electrified, rumbling and exhilarating, Suitcase of Stories will take the listener on a ride all right – riff-driven, technically skilfull (sic), and surprisingly diverse for such a rock record. For all the rowdy guitar and drums though, it is Mastin's spectacular voice that takes precedence here. At times soft, but often pushed to the limits, it's the voice that gives Mastin away: this is who he really is” calling the five songs “the most real body of work he's ever produced”.

Shane Pinnegar of 100% Rock awarded Suitcase of Stories seven-and-a-half stars out of ten, saying "Over five self-penned tracks here Mastin traverses bouncy radio-friendly rock and blues with a spritely spring in his step.” Pinnegar called the EP “pretty damned good”.

=== The Summer Nights Tour ===
To promote the EP, Mastin embarked on the Suitcase of Stories Tour across Australia, which began on 7 April 2018 in Sydney, and ended on 14 July 2018 in Albury. Mastin said “The one thing we didn't want to do with this is we didn't want it to be just a gig. We want it to be a show.” Adding “It's definitely going to be loud, lots of guitars in there. It's going to be very different to what I've done in the past on the road”.

Date	Location	Venue
7 April 2018	Sydney	The Basement
13 April 2018	Launceston	The Saloon Bar
14 April 2018	Hobart	The Waratah Hotel
20 April 2018	Shoalhaven	Shoalhaven Bowls Club
21 April 2018	Wollongong	Waves Club
29 April 2018	Adelaide	Fowlers
3 May 2018	Lismore	Lismore Workers’ Club
4 May 2018	Gold Coast	Surfer’s Paradise Live
5 May 2018	Brisbane	The Brightside
6 May 2018	Maroochydore	Sol Bar
10 May 2018	Canberra	Transit Bar
19 May 2018	Winton	Winton SuperSprint
25 May 2018	Mornington	Grand Hotel
27 May 2018	Melbourne	Max Watts
15 June 2018	Perth	The Grand Central Hotel
16 June 2018	Perth	The Charles Hotel
12 July 2018	Warrnambool	The Loft
13 July 2018	Geelong	The Workers’ Club
14 July 2018	Albury	SS&A Club

== Track listing ==
No.	Title	Length
1.	"The One That Never Gets Away"	3:18
2.	"The Problem"	3:41
3.	"Tell Me All About It"	4:48
4.	"Not the Man for You"	2:41
5.	"Suitcase of Stories"	4:48

== Release history ==
Region	Date	Format	Label
Australia	6 April 2018	digital download; streaming	MASTIN
