= Reece Mastin (album) =

2011 studio album by Reece Mastin

Studio album by Reece Mastin
- Released: 9 December 2011
- Recorded: 2011
- Genres: Rock; pop
- Label: Sony

Reece Mastin chronology
| Reece Mastin (2011) | Beautiful Nightmare (2012) |

Singles from Reece Mastin
- 1. "Good Night" Released: 22 November 2011

Reece Mastin is the self-titled debut studio album by Reece Mastin, the 2011 winner of The X Factor (Australia), released through Sony Music Australia on 9 December 2011. The album debuted at number two on the ARIA Albums Chart and was certified double platinum by the Australian Recording Industry Association (ARIA). The album's lead single "Good Night", preceded the album's release, and debuted at number one on the ARIA Singles Chart. To promote the album, Mastin toured shopping centres across Australia. He also embarked on his first headlining Australian tour in December 2011 and ended in February 2012.

== Background ==
Reece Mastin features re-recorded studio tracks of some of Mastin's performances during the live shows on The X Factor (Australia), as well as his winner's single, "Good Night". Mastin recorded the album in three days. In an interview with News Limited, he explained: "We had to go as quick as I could, but it was a good three days ... Every song I tried to put in as much of me as I could. That's a good starting point, trying to be a little bit original on a covers album."

== Release and promotion ==
Reece Mastin was released by Sony Music Australia on 9 December 2011, as both digital download and CD formats. To launch the album, Mastin performed "Good Night" on Sunrise. During the week of the album's release (9 – 15 December), Mastin toured shopping malls in New South Wales, Western Australia, South Australia, Victoria and Queensland, performing several of the album's songs and signing CDs for fans. He also held an instore appearance at the Westfield Parramatta store in New South Wales on 22 December.

=== Singles ===
Following Mastin's win on the third series of The X Factor (Australia) on 22 November 2011, his winner's single "Good Night" was released for digital download, and served as the lead single from the album. The single received mixed to positive reviews from music critics, who noted its similarities to Pink's "Raise Your Glass" (2010). "Good Night" debuted at number one on the ARIA Singles Chart, where it remained for four non-consecutive weeks. It was certified five times platinum by the Australian Recording Industry Association (ARIA), for selling 350,000 copies.

=== Tour ===
Mastin commenced his first headlining tour in Australia on 17 December 2011 and ended on 5 February 2012. Fellow X Factor contestants Johnny Ruffo and Christina Parie served as Mastin's supporting acts on the tour. The tour later extended in New Zealand during April 2012.

| Date | Country | City | Venue |
|---|---|---|---|
| 17 December 2011 | Australia | Sydney | The Big Top, Luna Park |
| 18 December 2011 | Australia | Sydney | The Big Top, Luna Park |
| 12 January 2012 | Australia | Gold Coast | Twin Towns |
| 13 January 2012 | Australia | Gold Coast | Twin Towns |
| 14 January 2012 | Australia | Brisbane | QPAC Brisbane Concert Hall |
| 15 January 2012 | Australia | Caloundra | Caloundra RSL |
| 19 January 2012 | Australia | Melbourne | The Palms at Crown (Evening) |
| 20 January 2012 | Australia | Melbourne | The Palms at Crown (Matinee) |
| 20 January 2012 | Australia | Melbourne | The Palms at Crown (Evening) |
| 21 January 2012 | Australia | Melbourne | The Palms at Crown (Matinee) |
| 21 January 2012 | Australia | Melbourne | The Palms at Crown (Evening) |
| 22 January 2012 | Australia | Hobart | Wrestpoint Entertainment Centre |
| 26 January 2012 | Australia | Perth | Burswood Theatre |
| 27 January 2012 | Australia | Perth | Burswood Theatre |
| 28 January 2012 | Australia | Adelaide | Thebarton Theatre |
| 29 January 2012 | Australia | Adelaide | Thebarton Theatre |
| 31 January 2012 | Australia | Adelaide | Thebarton Theatre |
| 3 February 2012 | Australia | Sydney | Enmore Theatre |
| 4 February 2012 | Australia | Newcastle | Newcastle Civic Theatre |
| 5 February 2012 | Australia | Canberra | Canberra Southern Cross Club |
| 10 April 2012 | New Zealand | Christchurch | CBS Canterbury Arena |
| 12 April 2012 | New Zealand | Wellington | TSB Bank Arena |
| 14 April 2012 | New Zealand | Auckland | Vector Arena |
| 16 April 2012 | New Zealand | Napier | Pettigrew Green Arena |

== Commercial performance ==
Reece Mastin debuted at number two on the ARIA Albums Chart on 19 December 2011. The album was certified double platinum by the Australian Recording Industry Association (ARIA), denoting shipments of 140,000 units. In New Zealand, the album debuted at number one on 27 February 2012 and was certified gold by the Recording Industry Association of New Zealand (RIANZ), denoting shipments of 7,500 copies.

== Track listing ==
| No. | Title | Length |
|---|---|---|
| 1. | "Good Night" | 3:02 |
| 2. | "Dream On" (Aerosmith song) | 3:28 |
| 3. | "Closer to the Edge" (Thirty Seconds to Mars song) | 3:34 |
| 4. | "Joker and the Thief" (Wolfmother song) | 3:07 |
| 5. | "Paradise City" (Guns N' Roses song) | 3:37 |
| 6. | "Breakeven (Falling to Pieces)" (The Script song) | 3:40 |
| 7. | "She Will Be Loved" (Maroon 5 song) | 3:47 |
| 8. | "Always" (Bon Jovi song) | 3:31 |
| 9. | "Stayin' Alive" (Bee Gees song) | 3:37 |
| 10. | "Ironic" (Alanis Morissette song) | 2:58 |
| 11. | "I Kissed a Girl" (Katy Perry song) | 3:06 |

== Charts and certifications ==
=== Weekly charts ===
| Chart (2011–12) | Peak position |
|---|---|
| Australian Albums Chart | 2 |
| New Zealand Albums Chart | 1 |

=== Year-end charts ===
| Chart (2011) | Position |
|---|---|
| Australian Albums Chart | 15 |
| Australian Artist Albums Chart | 2 |

| Chart (2012) | Position |
|---|---|
| Australian Albums Chart | 69 |
| Australian Artist Albums Chart | 23 |
| New Zealand Albums Chart | 21 |

=== Decade-end charts ===
| Chart (2010–2019) | Position |
|---|---|
| Australian Albums (ARIA) | 96 |
| Australian Artist Albums (ARIA) | 19 |

=== Certifications ===
| Country | Certification |
|---|---|
| Australia (ARIA) | 2× Platinum |
| New Zealand (RMNZ) | Gold |
