= Rebel and the Reason =

Single by Reece Mastin

from the album Rebel and the Reason
- Released: 27 March 2015
- Recorded: 2014–15
- Genre: Pop
- Length: 3:44
- Label: Social Family Records
- Songwriters: Ben Rodgers; Jean-Paul Fung; Reece Mastin
- Producers: Jean-Paul Fung; Ben Rodgers

Reece Mastin singles chronology
"Girls (All Around the World)" (2013)	"Rebel and the Reason" (2015)	"Even Angels Cry" (2015)

"Rebel and the Reason" is a song by British-Australian recording artist Reece Mastin. "Rebel and the Reason" was released on 27 March 2015 as the lead single from Mastin's first extended play of the same name and peaked at number fifty-one on the ARIA Singles Chart, becoming Mastin’s eighth Top 100 chart entry.

== Background and release ==
Mastin won the third season of The X Factor Australia in 2011 and subsequently signed with Sony Music Australia. Mastin released two albums and four of top twenty singles with Sony. In February 2015, it was announced that Mastin had parted ways with Sony Music Australia and signed with independent label Social Family Records.

In March 2015, Mastin announced a new single, a new EP and Australian east coast tour.

== Music video ==
The music video was directed by Jonathan Vasallo and premiered on 29 April 2015. The video depicts the traumas and repercussions of domestic violence in families. It coincided with the announcement that Reece is the newest White Ribbon ambassador.

Mastin cited the influence of videos such as Ed Sheeran’s "The A-Team" and Hozier’s "Take Me to Church" as helping to steer his decision to address the scourge of domestic violence and take on a greater role as a White Ribbon ambassador.

== Chart performance ==
Chart (2015)	Peak position
Australia (ARIA)	51
Australian Independent Chart (AIR)	6
