= Rune Westberg =

Danish-born American musician

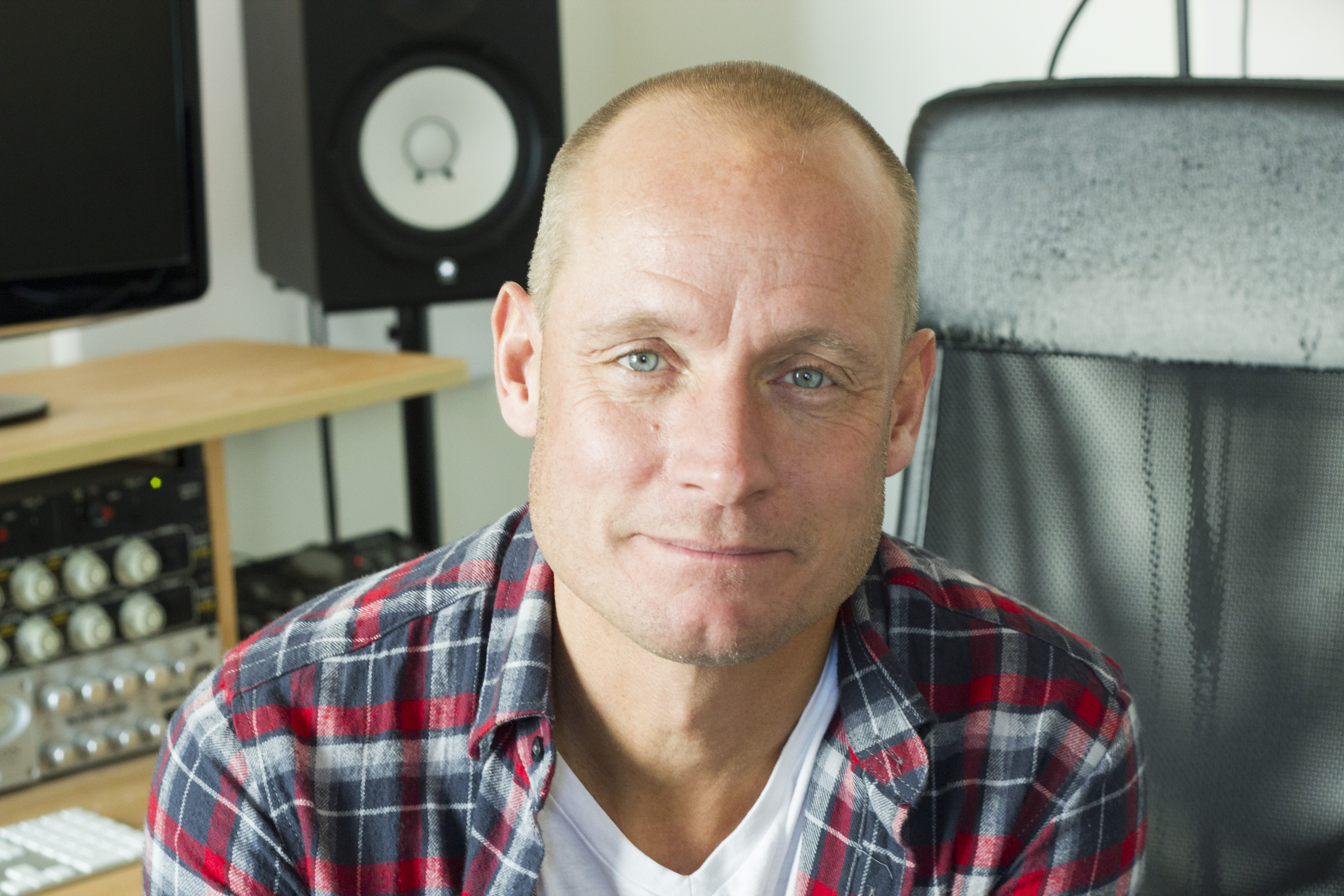

Rune Westberg (born November 22, 1974, in Risskov) is a Danish born songwriter, record producer, mixer and multi instrumentalist living and working in Los Angeles.

He released a solo album in 2001, entitled "Rune Westberg". In 2026 he released his next album, entitled "Definitely X".

Westberg has written and produced for artists including Saybia, Tue West, Adam Lambert, Magtens Korridorer, Bryan Rice, Alphabeat, Beth Hart, Sabrina Carpender, Colbie Caillat, and more. His work has been featured on many TV shows including Riverdale, Pretty Little Liars, The Rookie, Keeping Up With The Kardashians, Grey's Anatomy, Vampire Diaries, Girlfriend's Guide to Divorce, and more.

In 2010 Westberg won a BMI award for "No Surprise", a single on Daughtry's second album Leave This Town.

In 2016, he was nominated for a Latin Grammy for Song of the Year with "Ecos De Amor" performed by Jesse & Joy.

Westberg produced "Damaged Goods" by Hamish Anderson.
