= Anton Hagop =

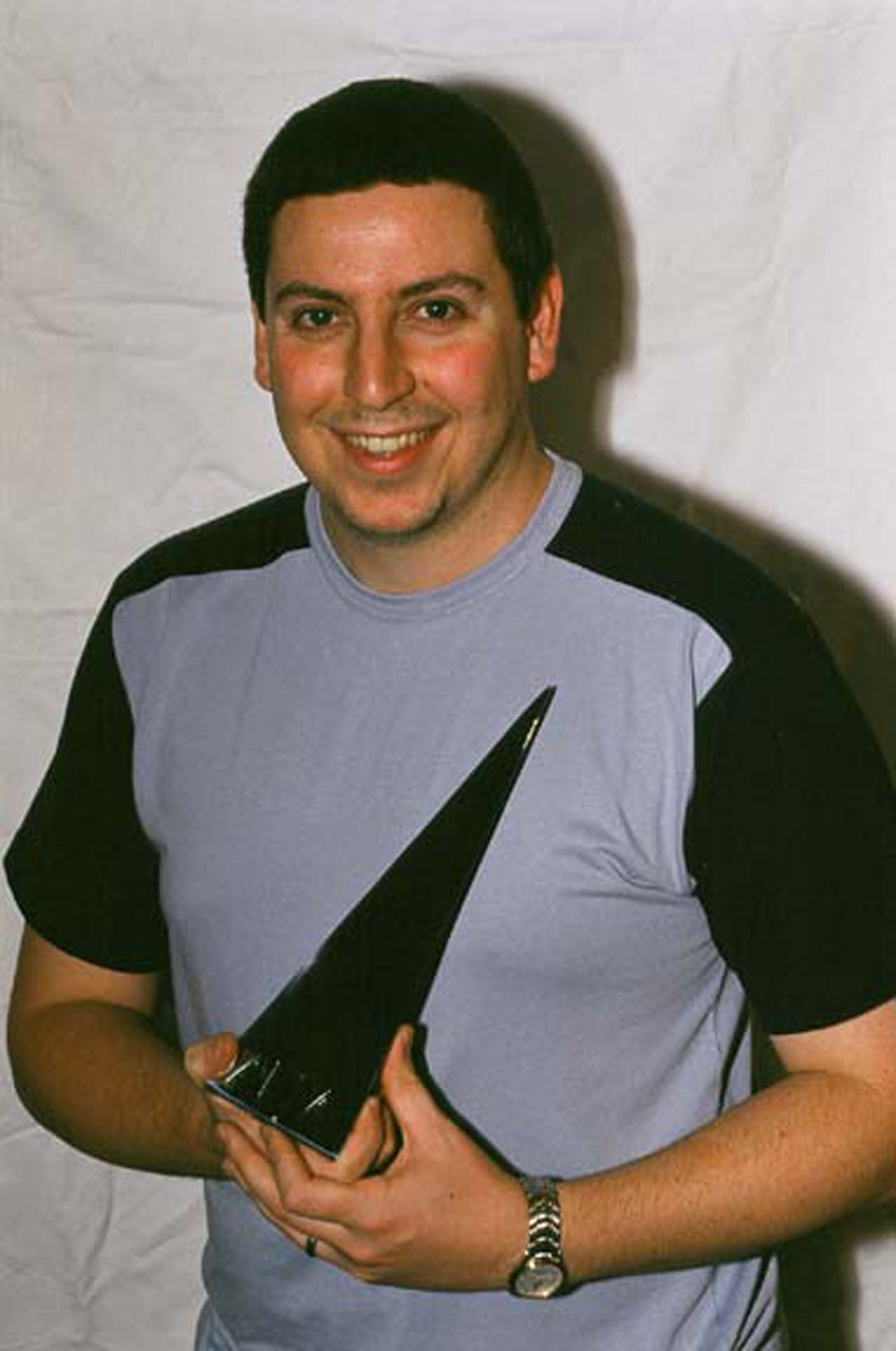
- Hagop accepting his ARIA in 2002 for Engineer of the Year.
- Born: Sydney, Australia
- Occupations: Mixing Engineer, Record Producer, Recording Engineer
- Years active: 1995-present
- Known for: silverchair, Powderfinger, Missy Higgins
- Awards: ARIA Engineer of the Year
- Website: https://www.antonhagop.com.au

Anton Hagop is an ARIA award-winning music producer / engineer from Australia who has worked with silverchair, Powderfinger, Missy Higgins. and Birds of Tokyo.

In 2002 he won the ARIA Engineer of the Year award for his work on silverchair’s iconic Diorama album, which spent 50 weeks in the ARIA charts and exceeded triple platinum sales.
