= Reece Mastin =

English-Australian singer-songwriter

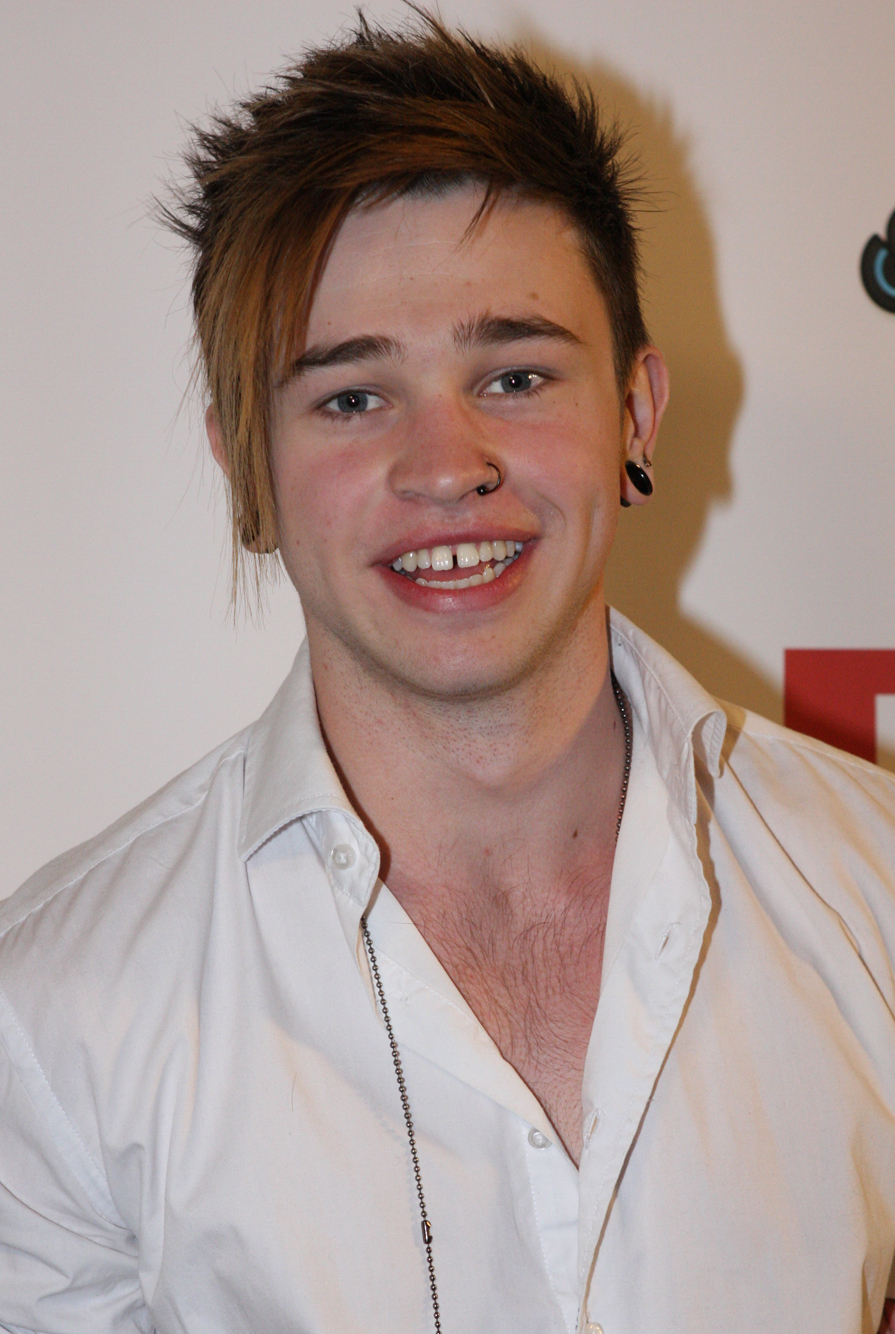
- Mastin in 2012

Background information
- Born: Reece John Phillip Mastin; 24 November 1994 (age 31); Scunthorpe, Lincolnshire, England
- Origin: Adelaide, South Australia, Australia
- Genres: Pop rock; metalcore
- Occupations: Singer; songwriter; musician
- Instruments: Vocals, guitar, piano
- Works: Discography
- Years active: 2011–present
- Website: reecemastinofficial.com.au

Reece John Phillip Mastin (born 24 November 1994) is an English-born Australian singer-songwriter and musician who won the third season of The X Factor Australia in 2011. Mastin subsequently signed with Sony Music Australia. His debut single "Good Night" reached number one in Australia and New Zealand and became Sony Music Australia's fastest-selling digital single. Mastin's self-titled debut album debuted at number two on the ARIA Albums Chart and was certified double platinum. His second studio album Beautiful Nightmare (2012) included the hit singles "Shut Up & Kiss Me" and "Shout It Out", the latter becoming Mastin's second number-one single in Australia. "Good Night" and "Shout It Out" earned him two ARIA No. 1 Chart Awards. In 2015, Mastin parted ways with Sony and signed with independent label Social Family Records. His third studio album Change Colours was released in October 2015, and debuted at number 12. In 2018, Reece released a new EP titled Suitcase of Stories under the name MASTIN.

== Early life ==
Reece Mastin was born on 24 November 1994 in Scunthorpe, Lincolnshire to Deb and Darren Mastin. Mastin has three sisters, including Georgina who auditioned for the fifth season of The X Factor Australia but got eliminated in the home visits round. At the age of seven, he was diagnosed with glue ear syndrome, a condition that is "caused by a chronic build-up of fluid in the middle ear and is the biggest cause of hearing loss in young children". Mastin taught himself how to sing at a young age, by singing along to his favourite songs on the radio. He began writing songs at the age of 12.

Mastin attended Golden Grove High School. Following his win on the third season of The X Factor Australia in 2011, Mastin withdrew from his high school and said that he would hire a mentor to help him finish Year 12. However, he later dropped out of Year 12 to focus entirely on his music career.

== Music career ==
=== 2011: The X Factor Australia and Reece Mastin ===
Mastin successfully auditioned for the third season of The X Factor Australia in 2011, singing Rooster's "Come Get Some". Before entering The X Factor, Mastin had already recorded an EP. He eventually reached the live shows and was mentored by Guy Sebastian. On 22 November 2011, Mastin was announced as the winner and received a management contract and a recording contract with Sony Music Australia. His winner's single "Good Night" was released shortly after, via digital download. "Good Night" had sold over 30,000 units within 24-hours of its release. On 24 November 2011, the song sold an average of one copy every 2.7 seconds, becoming the fastest selling digital single by an artist signed to Sony Music Australia. "Good Night" debuted at number one on the ARIA Singles Chart and was certified five times platinum by the Australian Recording Industry Association for sales of 350,000 copies. It also peaked at number one on the New Zealand Singles Chart and was certified platinum by the Recording Industry Association of New Zealand for sales of 15,000 copies.

Mastin's self-titled debut album, which features "Good Night" and selected songs he performed on The X Factor, was released on 9 December 2011. The album debuted at number two on the ARIA Albums Chart and was certified double platinum for shipments of 140,000 copies. It debuted at number one on the New Zealand Albums Chart and was certified gold for sales of 7,500 copies. To promote the album, Mastin embarked on his first headlining Australian and New Zealand concert tour in December 2011.

==== Performances on The X Factor ====
Show	Song choice	Original Artist	Theme	Result
Auditions	"Come Get Some"	Rooster	Free choice	Through to bootcamp
Bootcamp	"Feeling Good"	Anthony Newley	Free choice	Through to home visits
Bootcamp	"Toxic"	Britney Spears	Free choice	Through to home visits
Home visits	"Best of You"	Foo Fighters	Free choice	Through to live shows
Live show 1	"Closer to the Edge"	Thirty Seconds to Mars	Judges' choice	Safe
Live show 2	"I Kissed a Girl"	Katy Perry	Party anthems	Safe
Live show 3	"Dream On"	Aerosmith	Rock	Safe
Live show 4	"Ironic"	Alanis Morissette	The 90s	Safe
Live show 5	"She Will Be Loved"	Maroon 5	Number-one hits	Safe
Live show 6	"Joker & the Thief"	Wolfmother	Australian hits	Safe
Live show 7	"Stayin' Alive"	Bee Gees	Dance	Bottom two
Final Showdown (Live Show 7)	"Always"	Bon Jovi	Free choice	Saved by judges' vote
Live show 8	"All by Myself"	Celine Dion	Legends	Safe
Semi-final	"Breakeven"	The Script	Emotional song	Safe
Semi-final	"Paradise City"	Guns N' Roses	Uplifting song	Safe
Final	"Come Get Some"	Rooster	Audition song	Safe
Final	"Dream On"	Aerosmith	Song of the series	Safe
Final	"Kids" (with Kylie Minogue)	Robbie Williams and Kylie Minogue	Superstar duet	Safe
Final	"Good Night"	Mastin	Winner's single	Winner

=== 2012–2017: Beautiful Nightmare, Rebel and the Reason and Change Colours ===
Mastin's second studio album Beautiful Nightmare was released on 19 October 2012. The album debuted at number three on the ARIA Albums Chart and was certified gold for shipments of 35,000 copies. It also debuted at number two on the New Zealand Albums Chart. Beautiful Nightmare produced the top-five platinum singles "Shut Up & Kiss Me" and "Shout It Out", the latter became Mastin's second number-one single on the ARIA Charts. The third single "Rock Star" reached the top-twenty and was also certified platinum. To promote the album, Mastin embarked on The Summer Nights Tour in Australia and New Zealand. On 21 September 2012, Mastin released a 40-minute documentary on DVD titled, Behind Closed Doors, which featured interviews from his close friends and family, his X Factor mentor Guy Sebastian, as well as early footage and photos of Mastin as a child, and his music videos thus far. Behind Closed Doors debuted at number one on the ARIA Music DVDs Chart and was certified platinum.

Mastin released the single "Girls (All Around the World)" on 25 October 2013, and it only managed to peak to number 59 on the ARIA Singles Chart. In January 2014, Mastin embarked on the Restless Tour, his third headlining concert tour, in regional Victoria. In September 2014, he embarked on his fourth headlining concert tour, entitled the Wolf in the Woods Tour. In February 2015, it was announced that Mastin had parted ways with Sony Music Australia and signed with independent label Social Family Records. Along with a new label, fellow musician and friend Mahalia Barnes became Mastin's new manager. He released "Rebel and the Reason" on 27 March 2015 as the lead single from his debut EP of the same name. The EP was released on 1 May 2015. Mastin's third studio album Change Colours was released on 9 October 2015, and debuted at number 12 on the ARIA Albums Chart. "Even Angels Cry" was released as the album's lead single via a Twitter campaign which drew thousands of retweets of the album's snippets people loved the most. "Heartache Blues" was released as the album's second single in April 2016. In May 2016, Mastin travelled to Los Angeles after being chosen by APRA/AMCOS to take part in SongHubs, which aims to connect local and international songwriters.

In May 2015, Mastin appeared on the ABC2 show Tattoo Tales. The then 20-year-old singer appeared on the series, which is filmed at Bondi Ink, located at Bondi Beach Australia, as he got a design of his grandfather wearing Indian war makeup and a wolf headdress finished. He joined Sheppard on their Australian tour late 2017.

=== 2018: Name change and Suitcase of Stories ===
In February 2018, Mastin announced the release of new material under the single name, Mastin. Mastin explained the name change was "To change people's idea of what the record really is and who I am as an artist. And [to] draw a firm line in the sand." The single "Not the Man for You" was released on 2 March 2018 with the EP Suitcase of Stories on 6 April 2018.

=== 2020–2025: "The River" and "On the Run" ===
On 20 March 2020, Mastin released the single "The River", returning to his full name Reece Mastin. In August 2022, Mastin embarked on an Australian tour to celebrate the 10-year anniversary of winning The X Factor in 2011. Mastin said of the tour: "It dawned on us before COVID happened that we wanted to do an anniversary tour[;] the show is about reminiscing on the things we have been able to achieve for the past 10 years, it has songs from all the records and all the hits." He also released the single "On the Run" on 31 October 2022.

=== 2025-present: Change in musical style, "Wembley", "Blackhole" and upcoming fourth album ===
On 7 November 2025, Mastin released the single "Wembley", which marked a drastic departure from his pop rock style, instead showcasing a metalcore sound.

On 13 October 2026, Mastin posted a video on his Instagram page announcing that he is currently working on a new album, while also revealing in the same video (and subsequent videos) that the album will feature a heavier metalcore sound. The first single of the album, "Blackhole", was released on 30 October 2026.

== Discography ==
- Reece Mastin (2011)
- Beautiful Nightmare (2012)
- Change Colours (2015)

== Tours ==
- Australia and New Zealand Tour (2011–12)
- The Summer Nights Tour (2012–13)
- Restless Tour (2014)
- Wolf in the Woods Tour (2014)
- Rebel and the Reason Tour (2015)
- Down to Earth Tour (2015–16)
- The Suitcase of Stories Tour (2018)
- 10 Year Anniversary Tour (2022)

== Awards and nominations ==
Year	Type	Award	Result
2011	Poprepublic.tv IT List Awards	Single of 2011 ("Good Night")	Nominated
2011	Poprepublic.tv IT List Awards	Album of 2011 (Reece Mastin)	Nominated
2011	Poprepublic.tv IT List Awards	Australian Male Artist	Nominated
2012	ARIA No. 1 Chart Awards	No. 1 Single ("Good Night")	Won
2012	ARIA No. 1 Chart Awards	No. 1 Single ("Shut Up & Kiss Me")	Won
2012	ARIA Music Awards	Song of the Year ("Good Night")	Nominated
2012	Channel [V] Awards	[V] Oz Artist of the Year	Nominated
2012	Poprepublic.tv IT List Awards	Favourite Australian Male Artist	Nominated
2012	Poprepublic.tv IT List Awards	Favourite Album of 2012 (Beautiful Nightmare)	Nominated
2013	Kids' Choice Awards	Aussie's Fave Homegrown Act	Nominated
2013	Channel [V] Awards	[V] Oz Artist of the Year	Nominated
2013	Poprepublic.tv Awards	Favourite Australian Male Artist	Nominated

Preceded by Altiyan Childs	The X Factor (Australia); Winner; 2011	Succeeded by Samantha Jade
