= Good Night (Reece Mastin song) =

2011 single by Reece Mastin

Single by Reece Mastin

from the album Reece Mastin
- Released: 22 November 2011
- Recorded: 2011
- Genre: Pop, pop rock
- Length: 3:02
- Label: Sony
- Songwriters: Hayley Warner; Anthony Egizii; David Musumeci
- Producer: DNA Songs

Reece Mastin singles chronology
"Good Night" (2011)	"Shut Up & Kiss Me" (2012)

"Good Night" is the debut single by British-Australian recording artist Reece Mastin, who won the third series of The X Factor (Australia) in 2011. It was released digitally on 22 November 2011, shortly after the show ended, as the lead single from his self-titled debut album. The song was written by Hayley Warner with Anthony Egizii and David Musumeci of the songwriting and production duo DNA Songs. "Good Night" received mixed to positive reviews from music critics, most of whom noted its similarities to Pink's "Raise Your Glass" (2010). The song debuted at number one on the ARIA Singles Chart, and became the first number-one winner's single for The X Factor (Australia). It was certified five times platinum by the Australian Recording Industry Association (ARIA), denoting sales of 350,000 copies. "Good Night" also peaked at number one in New Zealand and was certified platinum by the Recording Industry Association of New Zealand (RIANZ).

== Background ==
"Good Night" was written by Hayley Warner with Anthony Egizii and David Musumeci of the songwriting and production duo DNA Songs, who also produced the track. On 22 November 2011, "Good Night" was released for digital download and sent to Australian radio, shortly after Mastin won the third series of The X Factor (Australia). When speaking of the song, Mastin explained: "It's got that old' summery-rock kinda feel to it you know, like classic rock songs like 'Boys of Summer' (Don Henley). It's just really fun, and songs from [X Factor] winners are usually really big ballads, so it was cool to do something a little bit different."

== Critical reception ==
Reviewers of The Hot Hits Live from LA wrote that they had "fallen in love with the track" and that the song was a "guaranteed hit that might just be our summer 2012 party anthem." A reviewer of Take 40 Australia wrote that it is "reminiscent of some of Pink's earlier tunes ... We think this will definitely be a hot summer hit!." Reviewers of MusicFix noted the song's similarities to Pink's "Raise Your Glass", and wrote that "we were pretty disappointed to hear his [Mastin's] epic rock vocals restrained to a shouty party track." This was echoed by Tonges of Nova FM, who wrote it was "shockingly similar to Pink's 'Raise Your Glass'". Lauren Katulka of Sounds of Oz wrote that the verses in the song "felt like virtual carbon copies of Pink's 'Raise Your Glass'", and concluded by writing that "it didn't feel like Reece, which is really disappointing when the [winner's] singles are supposed to be tailored to the artists." Robert Copsey of Digital Spy UK wrote that "While the riff has more than a passing resemblance to Pink's 'Raise Your Glass', we can see why he went overseas to find fame when their winner's singles are of this calibre." "Good Night" was nominated for 'Single of 2011' at the 2011 IT List Awards.

== Chart performance ==
"Good Night" debuted at number one on the ARIA Singles Chart on 28 November 2011, where it remained for four non-consecutive weeks. It sold over 30,000 copies in 24-hours following its release on 22 November, and became Sony Music Australia's fastest selling digital single. On 24 November 2011, the song sold an average of one copy every 2.7 seconds. "Good Night" was certified five times platinum by the Australian Recording Industry Association (ARIA), denoting sales of 350,000 copies. In New Zealand, the song debuted at number two on 20 February 2012, and peaked at number one the following week. "Good Night" was certified platinum by the Recording Industry Association of New Zealand (RIANZ), denoting sales of 15,000 copies.

== Music video and live performances ==
The accompanying music video for "Good Night" was filmed on 30 November 2011 in The Lair at The Metro Theatre in Sydney. 200 fans (aged 16 and over) were recruited for the video and had to download the Performer Agreement sheet via Mastin's official website before being eligible to be in the video. A behind the scenes video by The Daily Telegraph was released on 1 December 2011, and showed Mastin on the set of the video shoot performing on stage with a band. The video premiered online on 7 December 2011. The video begins with Mastin backstage with his band preparing for a concert. As the song starts to play, Mastin is seen playing the guitar and kicking a soccer ball. He is then seen on the stage performing, whilst also showing scenes of the audience singing and dancing. The video then shows Mastin outside greeting fans, and scenes of him backstage at the concert playing with an arcade game machine. The video ends with Mastin's fans screaming, as he leaves the stage.

Mastin performed "Good Night" live for the first time on The X Factor (Australia) Grand Final show on 21 November 2011. He performed the song again on the Grand Final decider show the following day, after he was announced the winner. On 9 December 2011, Mastin performed "Good Night" on Sunrise to launch his debut album. He later performed the song during his first headlining Australian tour in January 2012.

== Track listing ==
- CD single / digital download
1. "Good Night" – 3:02

== Charts and certifications ==
=== Weekly charts ===
Chart (2011–12)	Peak position
Australian Singles Chart	1
New Zealand Singles Chart	1

=== Year-end charts ===
Chart (2011)	Position
Australian Singles Chart	27
Australian Artist Singles Chart	2

Chart (2012)	Position
Australian Artist Singles Chart	16
New Zealand Singles Chart	26

=== Certifications ===
Country	Certifications
Australia	5× Platinum
New Zealand	Platinum

== Release history ==
Region	Date	Format	Label	Catalogue
Australia	22 November 2011	Digital download	Sony Music Australia	
United Kingdom	22 November 2011	Digital download	Sony Music Australia	
United States	22 November 2011	Digital download	Sony Music Australia	
Australia	10 February 2012	CD	Sony Music Australia	88691948042

== See also ==
- List of number-one singles of 2011 (Australia)
