= Studios 301 =

Australian recording studio

- Industry: Music production
- Predecessor: EMI
- Founded: 1926
- Headquarters: Alexandria, New South Wales, Australia
- Number of locations: Sydney, NSW Australia
- Key people: Tom Misner
- Website: studios301.com

Studios 301 is an Australian recording studio and is both the longest-running professional recording studio in the southern hemisphere and the largest studio complex in Australia.

== History ==
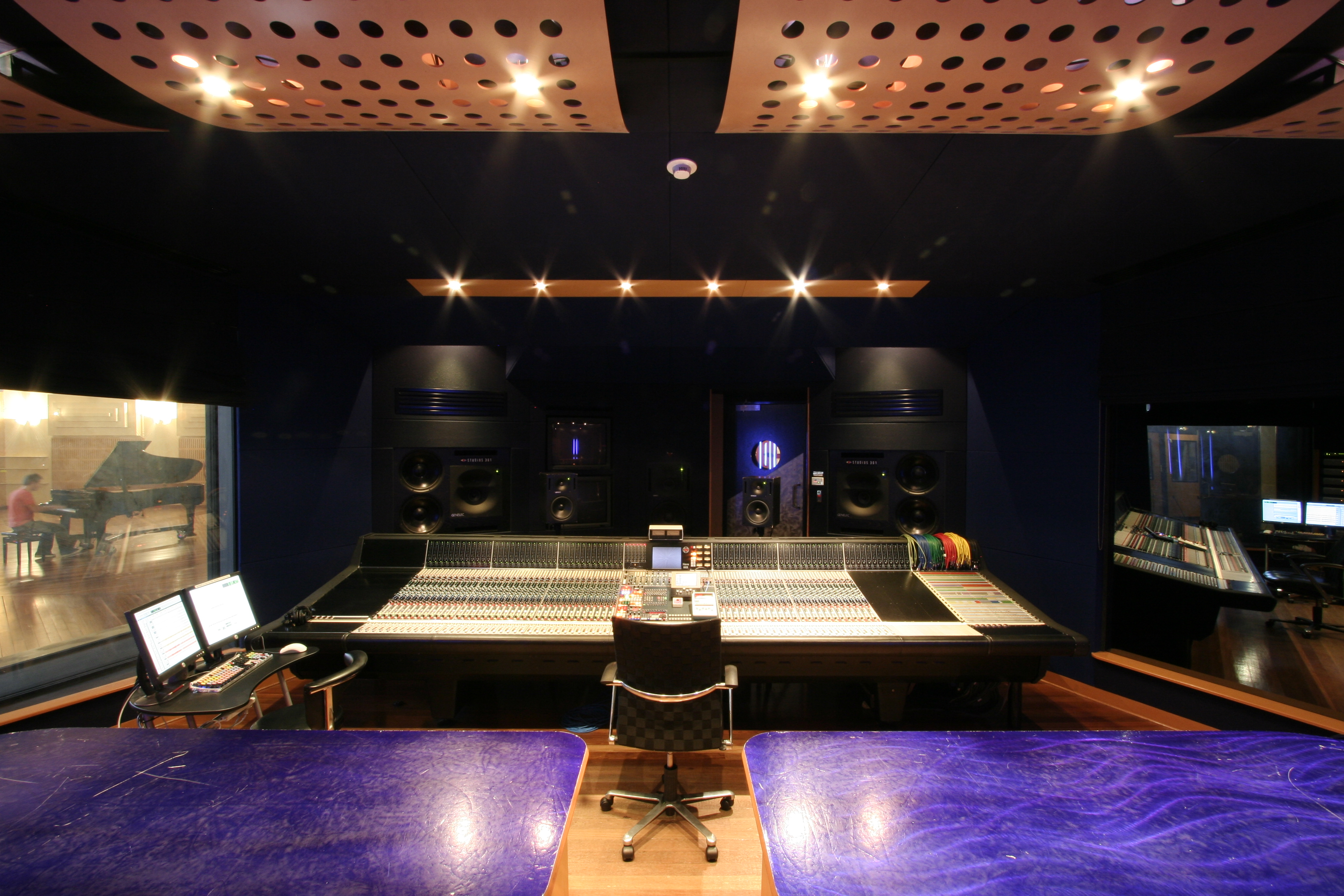
Studio 1 of Studios 301

The studio was founded in 1926 under the Columbia Graphophone Company as the Columbia Graphophone Studios. In 1954, the studios relocated from their original Homebush site to 301 Castlereagh Street in Sydney, and were renamed EMI Studios. In 1957, Slim Dusty recorded his hit "A Pub with No Beer" at Studios 301, was the biggest-selling record by an Australian to that time, the first Australian single to go gold and the first and only 78 rpm record to be awarded a gold disc.

In 1978, the studios were again completely re-equipped and renamed as Studios 301. In 1996, Studios 301 was purchased by its own management team. Two years later, the studios were purchased by producer/engineer and SAE Institute founder Tom Misner, who relocated and rebuilt the studios at 18 Mitchell Road, in the Sydney suburb of Alexandria. Studios 301 was part of SAE from 1998 until early 2011, when Navitas bought SAE Group from Misner, who retained ownership of the studios.

In August of 1983, for their album Seven and the Ragged Tiger Duran Duran moved recording and mixing to 301 Studios/Castlereagh Studios, in Sydney Australia

In 2017, Studios 301 relocated to a new studio complex located at 3 Ellis Avenue in Alexandria. The new 'Tier One' facility, designed by Misner and Jochen Veith, nearly doubled the size of Studios 301's previous location, with 4 recording/mixing rooms, 3 mastering studios and 4 pre-production room.

In 2020, Studios 301 and audio engineer Simon Cohen launched their 'pay it forward' initiative, allowing musicians to gift a free online audio mix to an artist of their choice.

In 2021, the studio partnered with Abbey Road Institute as a site of the school's music production program.
