= List of The X Factor (Australian TV series) finalists =

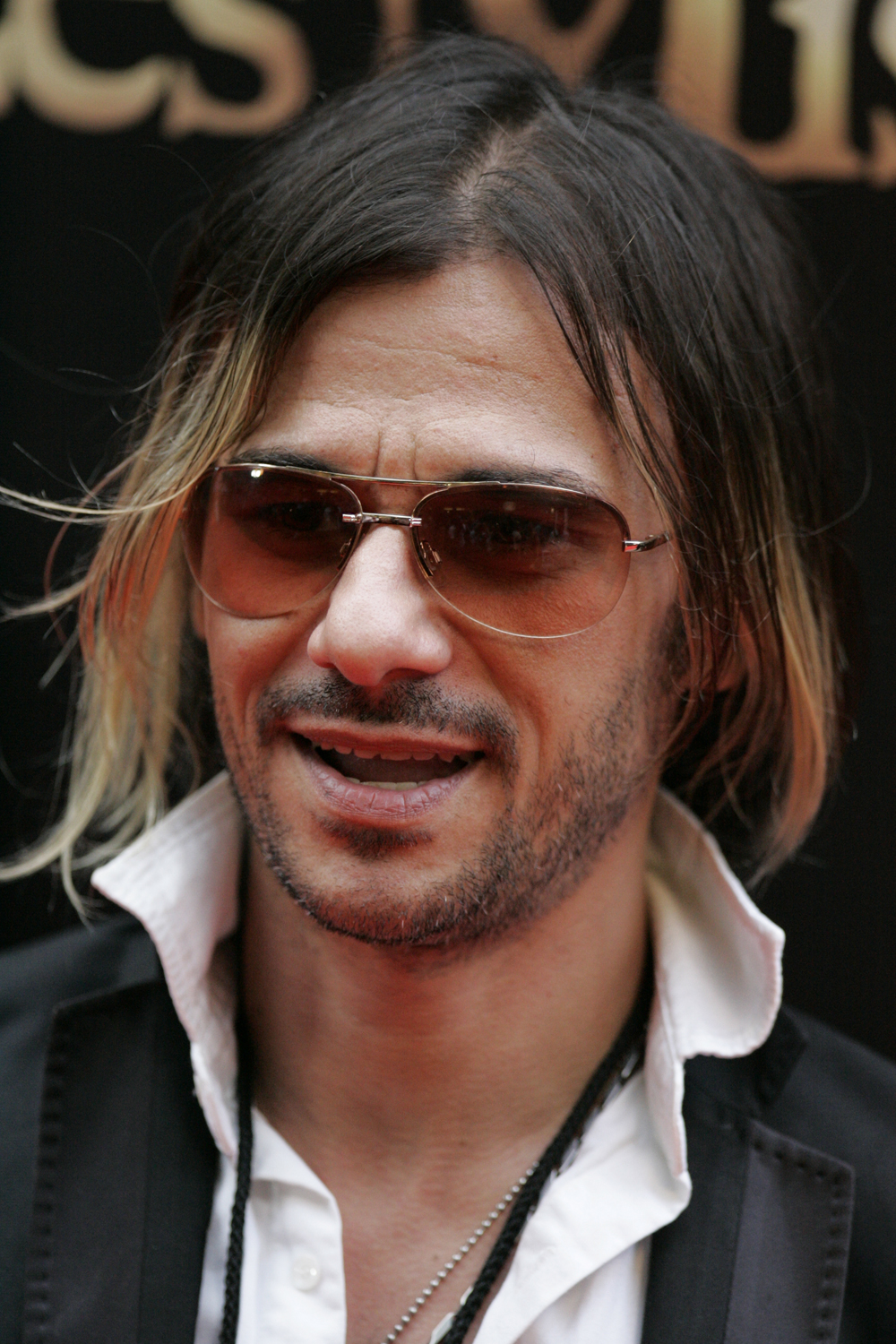
Altiyan Childs, season two winner

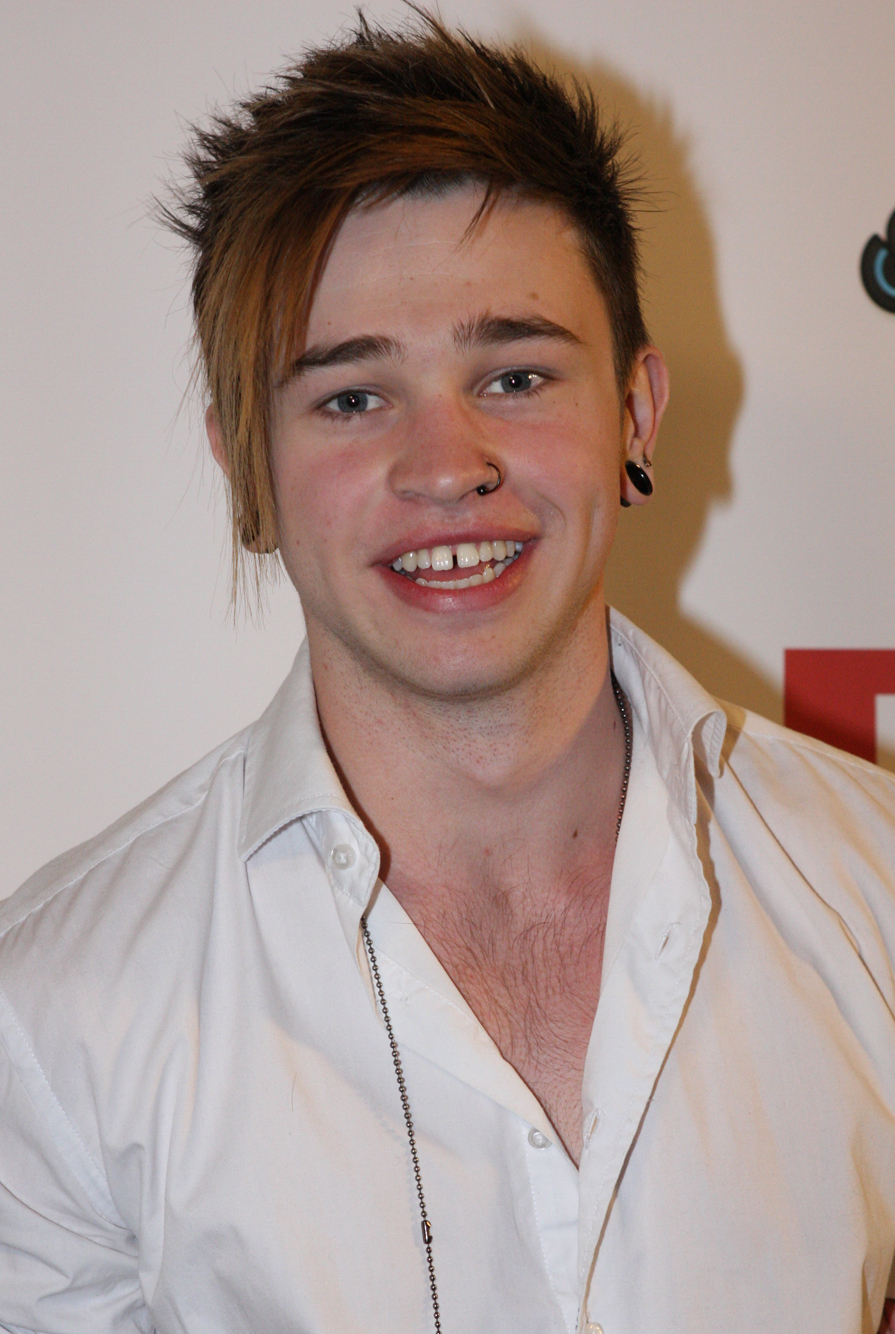
Reece Mastin, season three winner

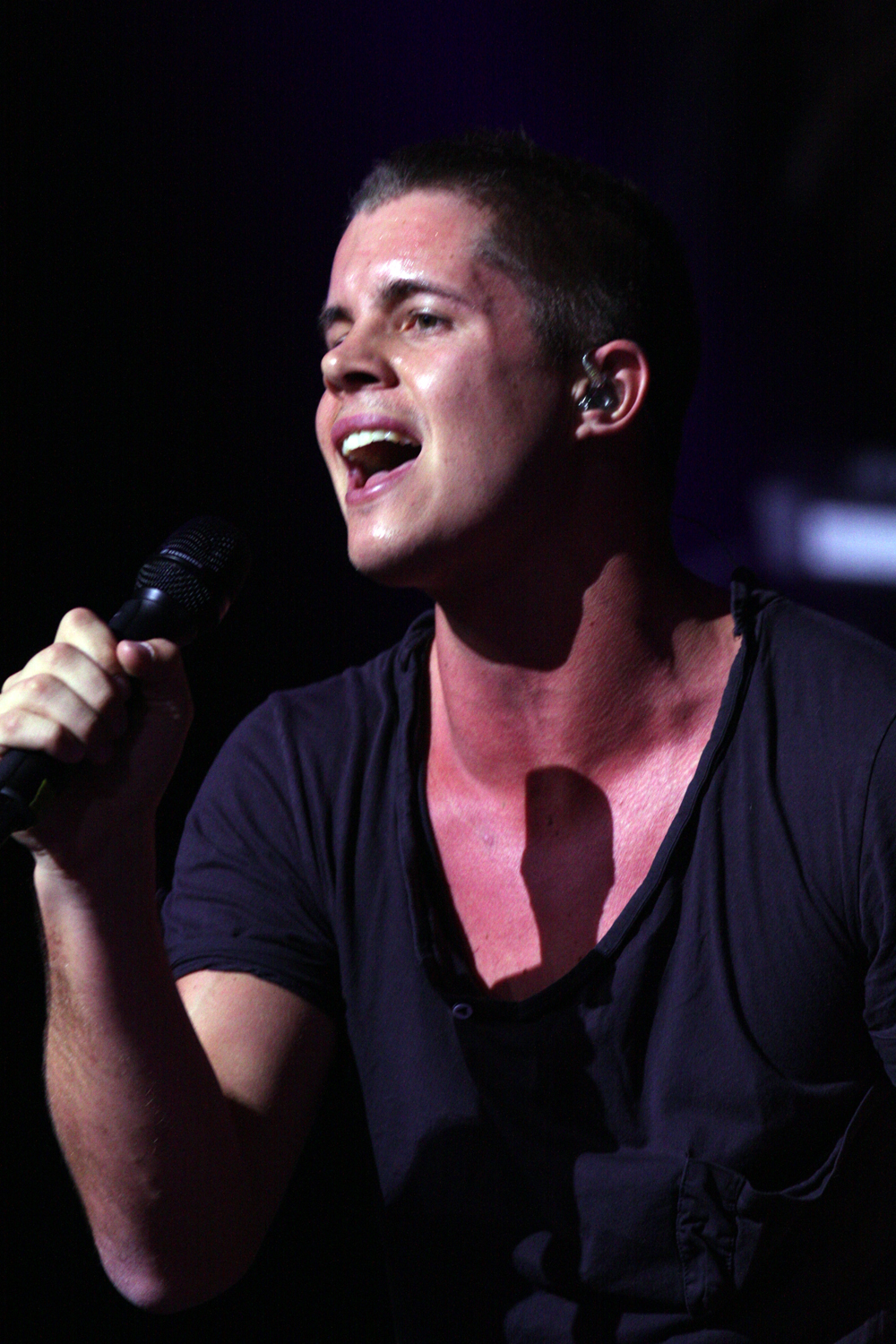
Johnny Ruffo, season three contestant

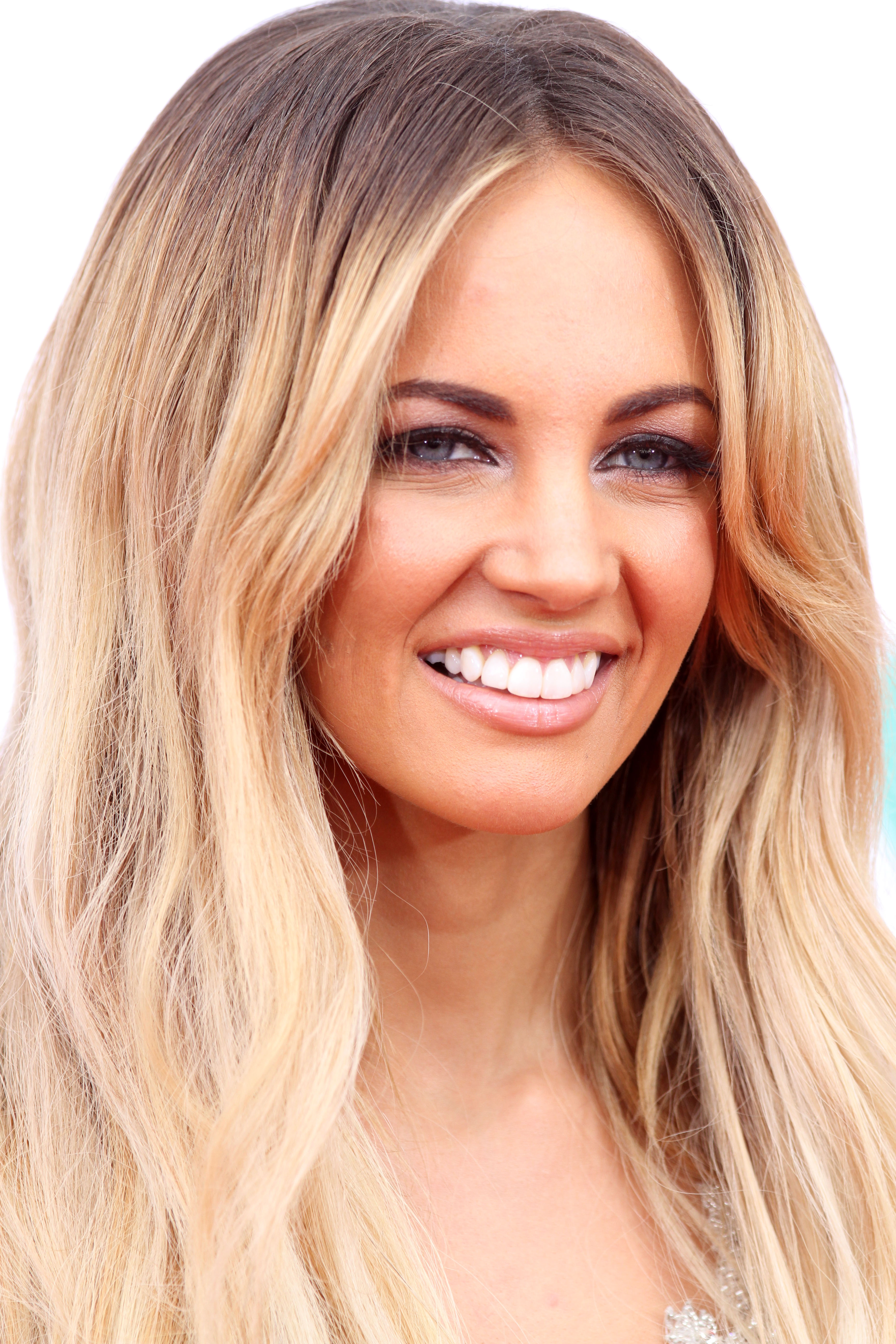
Samantha Jade, season four winner

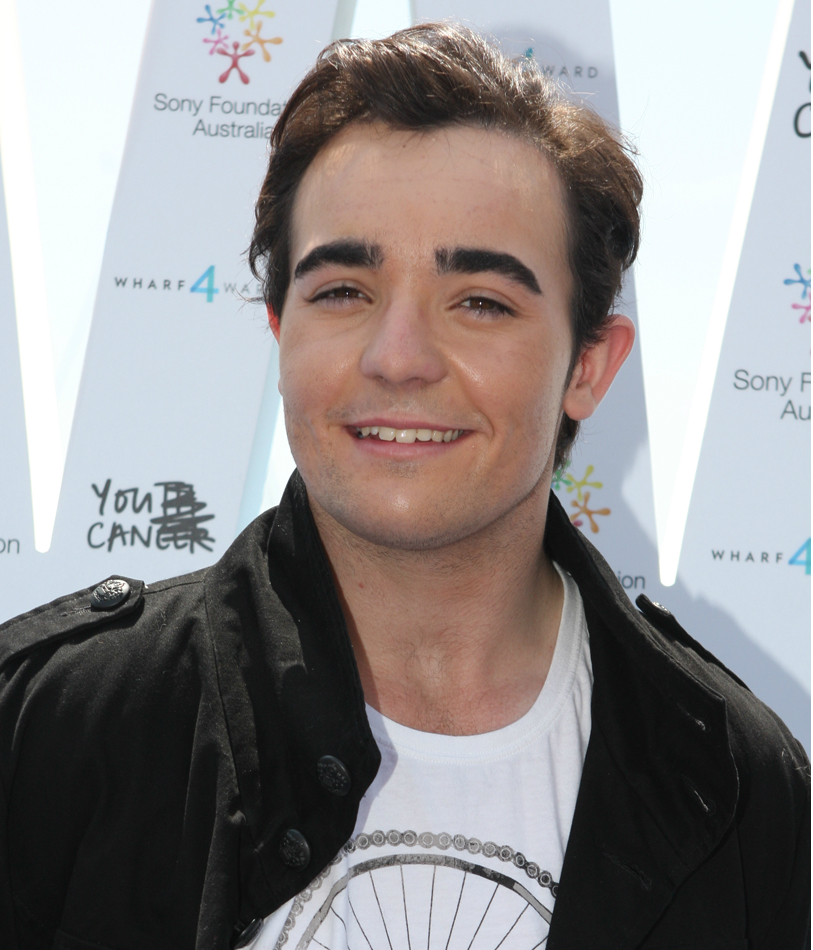
Jason Owen, season four runner-up

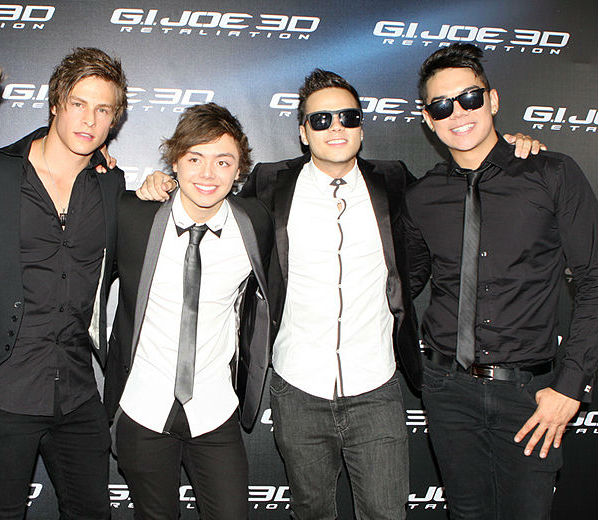
The Collective, season four contestants

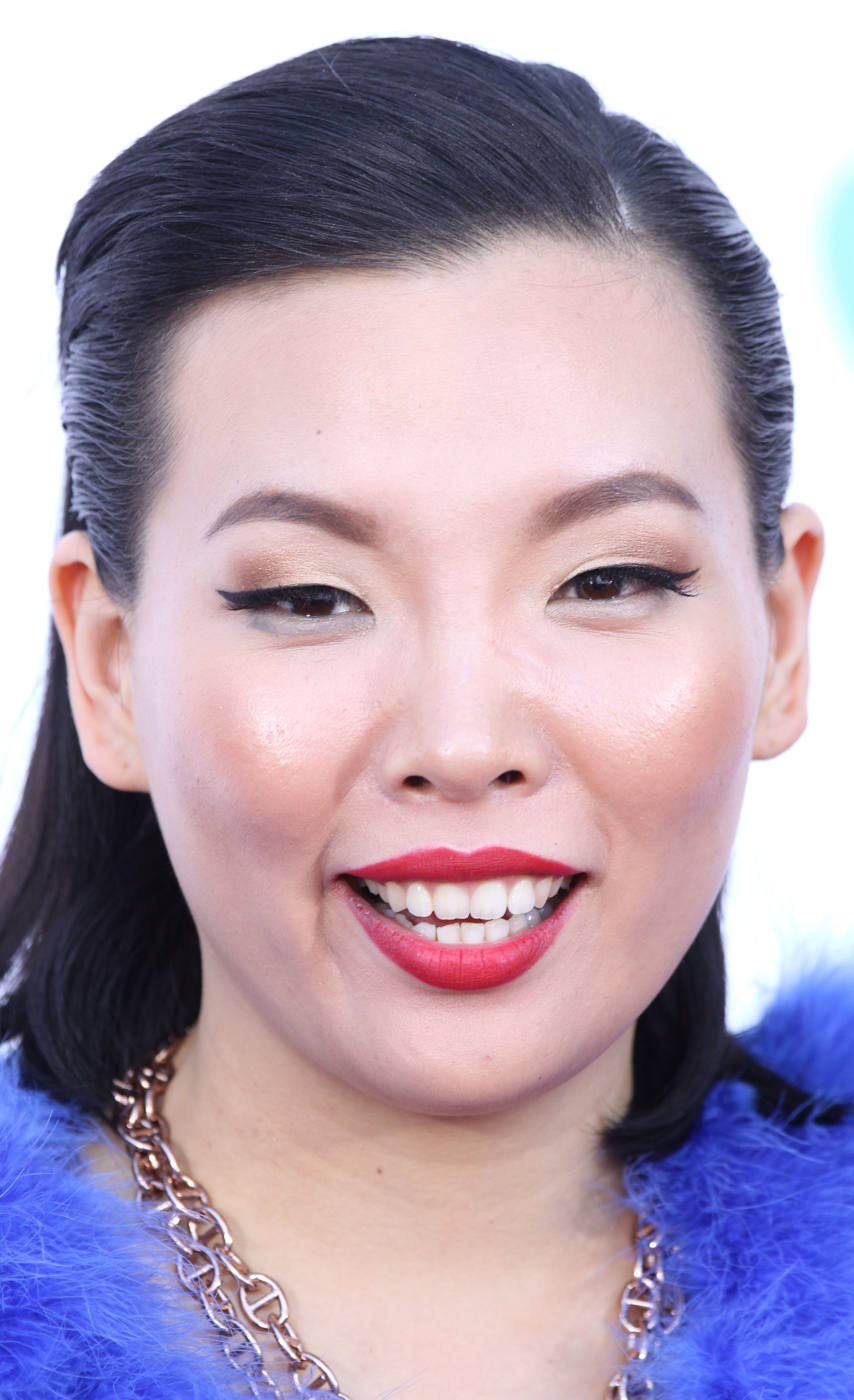
Dami Im, season five winner

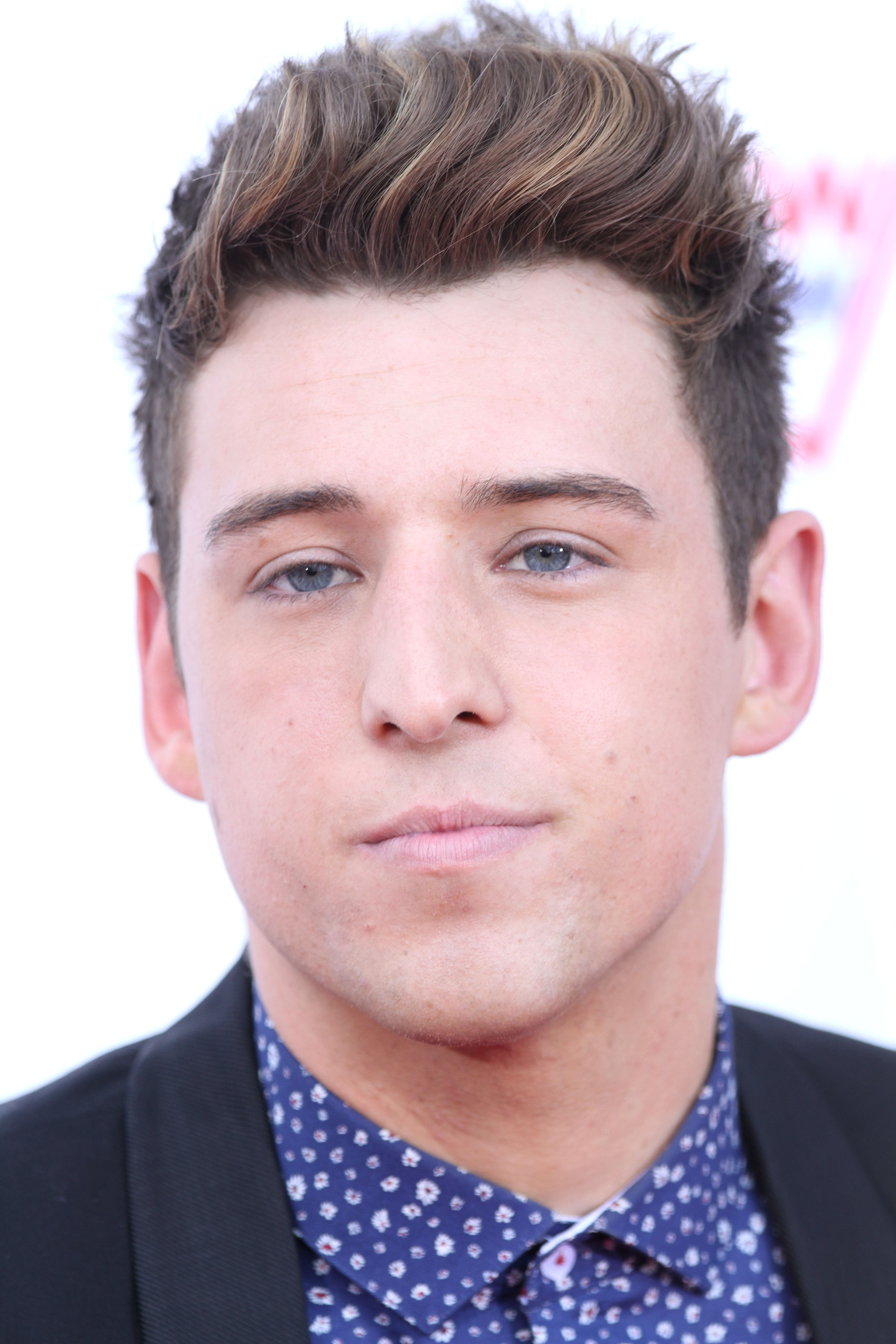
Taylor Henderson, season five runner-up

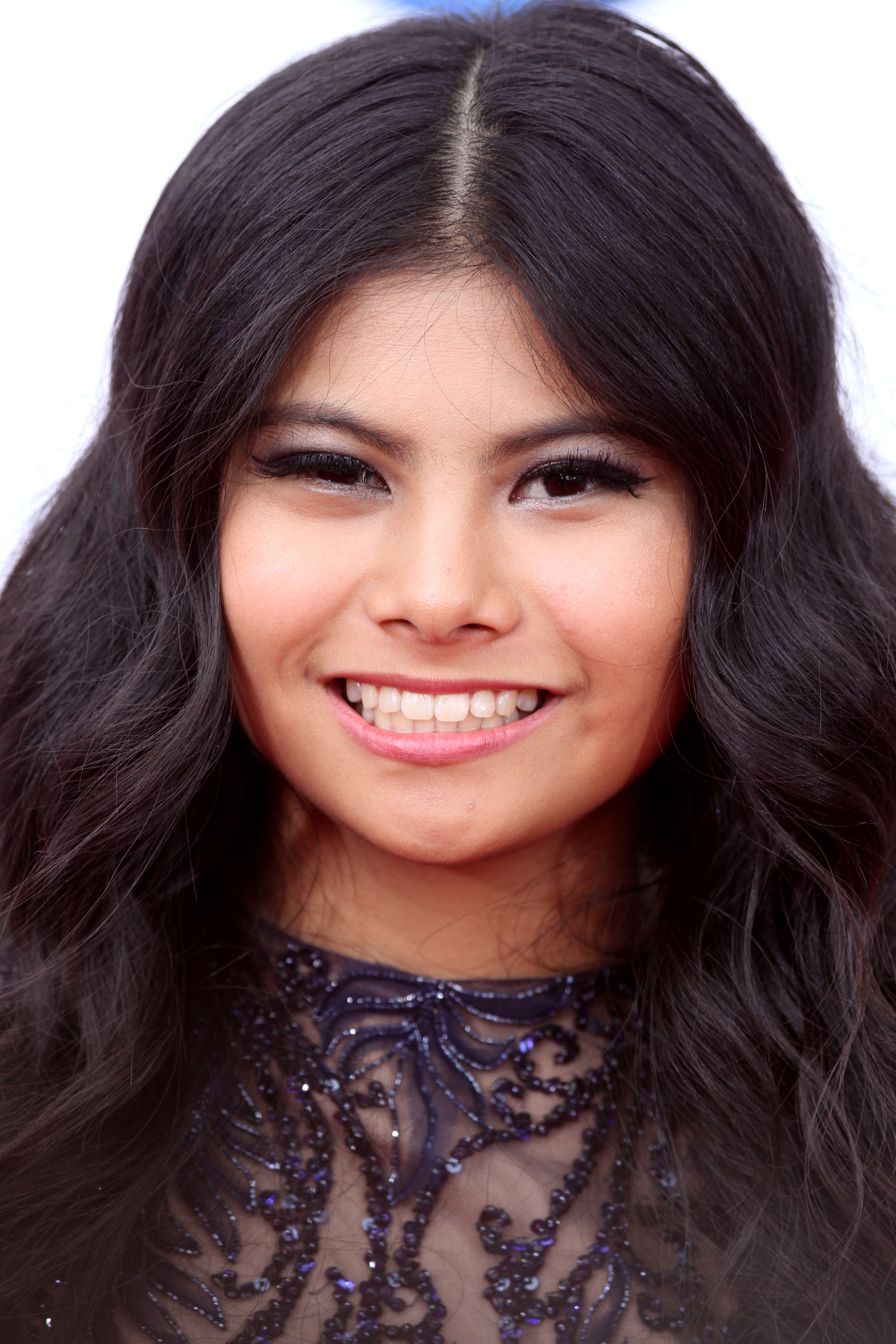
Marlisa Punzalan, season six winner

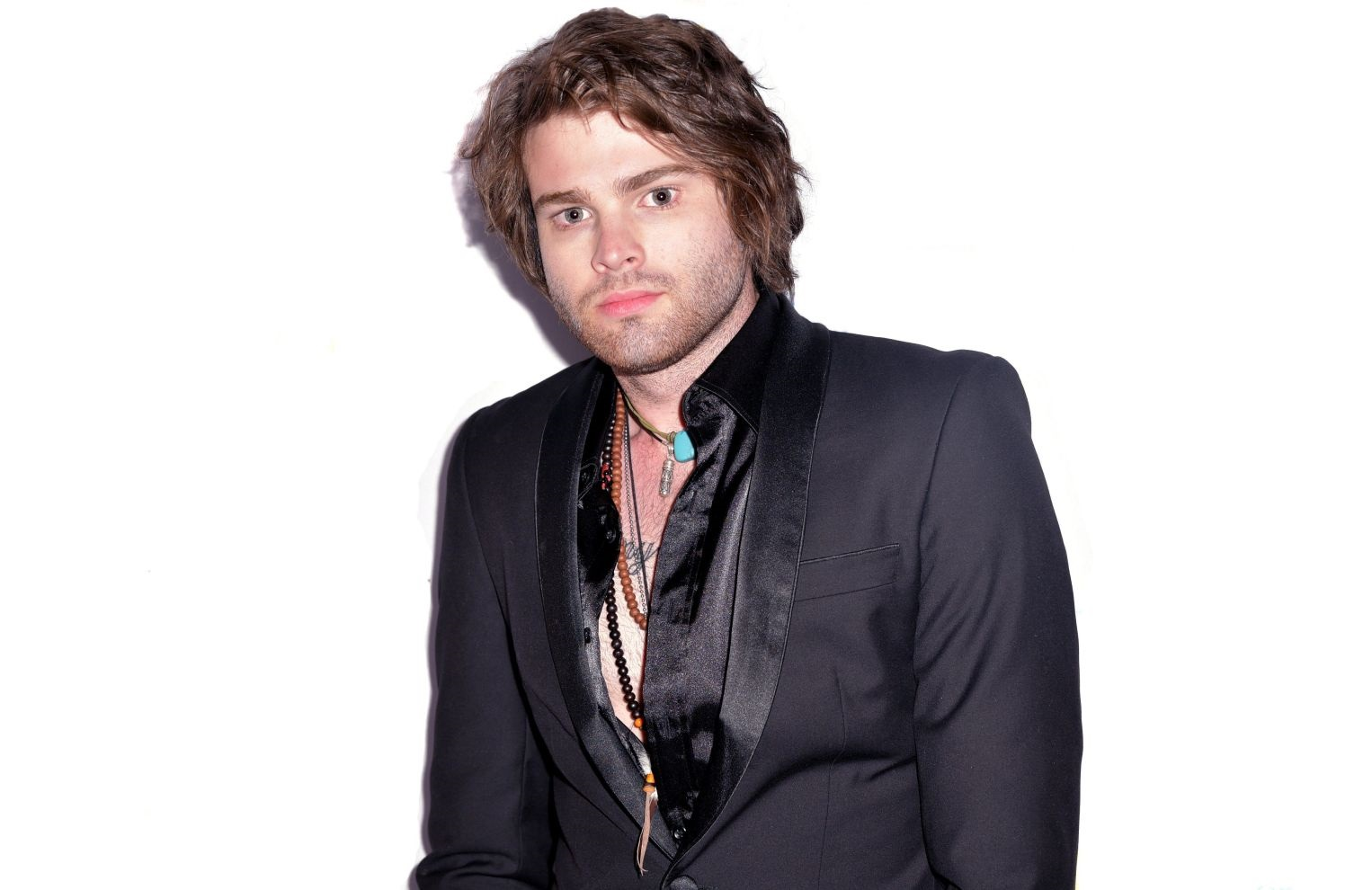
Dean Ray, season six runner-up

The X Factor is an Australian television reality music competition that first aired in 2005. As of 2015, there have been seven seasons; one on Network Ten and six on the Seven Network. The final round of the competition features a number of solo singers and vocal groups: nine for season 1, twelve for seasons 2, 3, 4, 5, 7 and 8, and thirteen for season 6. A total of 94 acts have reached the finals of their seasons. Season three winner Reece Mastin is the most successful contestant from the show, having attained two top-five albums and three number-one singles, with nine platinum and three gold certifications.

During season 1, the contestants were split into three categories: 16-24s (soloists aged 16 to 24), Over 25s (soloists aged 25 and over) and Groups (including duos). Each category was mentored by Mark Holden (head judge), Kate Ceberano and John Reid. From season 2 onwards, the 16-24s category was split into separate male and female sections, making four categories in all: Boys, Girls, Over 25s and Groups. The judging panel was replaced by Guy Sebastian (head judge), Natalie Imbruglia, Ronan Keating and Kyle Sandilands who is the additional fourth judge. In season three, Natalie Bassingthwaighte and Mel B joined the judging panel as replacements for Imbruglia and Sandilands. Dannii Minogue and Redfoo (head judge) replaced Mel B and Sebastian in season 5. In series 5, the over 25s were changed to over 24s, before being changed back to over 25s for series 6. Sebastian (head judge) returned in season 7 along with Chris Isaak and James Blunt to replace Redfoo, Bassingthwaighte and Keating. In season 8, boys and girls has been defunct and making the 14-21s to come back, the over 25s category was changed to over 22s. Mel B returned in 8 along with Iggy Azalea and Adam Lambert to replace Minogue, Issak and Blunt.

As of season 8, each five categories have won the show on at least one occasion, while six of the show's fifteen judges have had the winning act in their category at least once, with Sebastian and Keating winning twice, and Holden, Minogue, Isaak and Lambert winning once. The judges not to win were Reid, Cebrano, Imbruglia, Sandilands, Bassingthwaighte, Mel B, Redfoo, Blunt and Azalea with Bassingthwaighte placing runner-up in 2011 and 2014 (the first and the fourth of her four years on the panel), Reid, Imbruglia, Brown and Blunt placing runner-up in 2005, 2010, 2012 and 2015 respectively (their only season), Cebrano and Sandilands’ best performance having their contestant being the last eliminated in 2005 and 2010 respectively (their only season), Redfoo’s best performance having his contestant being the ninth eliminated in 2014 (the second of his two years on the panel) and Azalea’s best performance having her contestant being the third eliminated in 2016 (her only season).

== Contestants ==
Key:

– Winner
– Runner-up
– Disqualified

Name	Season	Category	Mentor	Finished
The Brothership	1	Groups	Mark Holden	9th
Jacob Butler	1	16-24s	Kate Ceberano	6th
Russell Gooley	1	Over 25s	John Reid	Runner-up
Vincent Harder	1	16-24s	Kate Ceberano	3rd
Kaya	1	Groups	Mark Holden	4th
Roslynn Mahe	1	Over 25s	John Reid	5th
Gemma Purdy	1	16-24s	Kate Ceberano	7th
Random	1	Groups	Mark Holden	Winner
Janie Shrapnel	1	Over 25s	John Reid	8th
Sally Chatfield	2	Girls	Natalie Imbruglia	Runner-up
Altiyan Childs	2	Over 25s	Ronan Keating	Winner
Chris Doe	2	Boys	Kyle Sandilands	12th
Amanda Grafanakis	2	Over 25s	Ronan Keating	9th
Kharizma	2	Groups	Guy Sebastian	10th
Andrew Lawson	2	Boys	Kyle Sandilands	3rd
Luke and Joel	2	Groups	Guy Sebastian	5th
India-Rose Madderom	2	Girls	Natalie Imbruglia	7th
Mahogany	2	Groups	Guy Sebastian	4th
James McNally	2	Over 25s	Ronan Keating	11th
Mitchell Smith	2	Boys	Kyle Sandilands	8th
Hayley Teal	2	Girls	Natalie Imbruglia	6th
Audio Vixen	3	Groups	Ronan Keating	9th
Tyla Bertolli	3	Girls	Mel B	11th
Mitchell Callaway	3	Over 25s	Natalie Bassingthwaighte	7th
Cleo Howman	3	Over 25s	Natalie Bassingthwaighte	12th
Reece Mastin	3	Boys	Guy Sebastian	Winner
Jacqui Newland	3	Girls	Mel B	10th
Christina Parie	3	Girls	Mel B	6th
Johnny Ruffo	3	Boys	Guy Sebastian	3rd
Declan Sykes	3	Boys	Guy Sebastian	5th
Three Wishez	3	Groups	Ronan Keating	4th
Andrew Wishart	3	Over 25s	Natalie Bassingthwaighte	Runner-up
Young Men Society	3	Groups	Ronan Keating	8th
Josh Brookes	4	Boys	Mel B	Disqualified 12th^{[A]}
The Collective	4	Groups	Ronan Keating	3rd
Bella Ferraro	4	Girls	Natalie Bassingthwaighte	4th
Fortunate	4	Groups	Ronan Keating	7th
Shiane Hawke	4	Girls	Natalie Bassingthwaighte	5th
Samantha Jade	4	Over 25s	Guy Sebastian	Winner
Adil Memon	4	Boys	Mel B	13th
Carmelo Munzone	4	Boys	Mel B	9th
Jason Owen	4	Boys	Mel B	Runner-up
Justin Standley	4	Over 25s	Guy Sebastian	10th
Angel Tupai	4	Girls	Natalie Bassingthwaighte	8th
What About Tonight	4	Groups	Ronan Keating	11th
Nathaniel Willemse	4	Over 25s	Guy Sebastian	6th
Adira–Belle	5	Groups	Natalie Bassingthwaighte	12th
Omar Dean	5	Boys	Ronan Keating	6th
Joelle Hadjia	5	Girls	Redfoo	8th
Taylor Henderson	5	Boys	Ronan Keating	Runner-up
Dami Im	5	Over 24s	Dannii Minogue	Winner
JTR	5	Groups	Natalie Bassingthwaighte	7th
Ellie Lovegrove	5	Girls	Redfoo	9th
Barry Southgate	5	Over 24s	Dannii Minogue	10th
Third Degree	5	Groups	Natalie Bassingthwaighte	4th
Jiordan Tolli	5	Girls	Redfoo	5th
Cat Vas	5	Over 24s	Dannii Minogue	11th
Jai Waetford	5	Boys	Ronan Keating	3rd
Brothers3	6	Groups	Dannii Minogue	3rd
Sydnee Carter	6	Girls	Ronan Keating	9th
Reigan Derry	6	Over 25s	Redfoo	4th
Jason Heerah	6	Over 25s	Redfoo	6th
Adrien Nookadu	6	Boys	Natalie Bassingthwaighte	11th
Rochelle Pitt	6	Over 25s	Redfoo	8th
Marlisa Punzalan	6	Girls	Ronan Keating	Winner
Dean Ray	6	Boys	Natalie Bassingthwaighte	Runner-up
Caitlyn Shadbolt	6	Girls	Ronan Keating	5th
Tee	6	Boys	Natalie Bassingthwaighte	7th
Trill	6	Groups	Dannii Minogue	13th
XOX	6	Groups	Dannii Minogue	10th
Younger Than Yesterday	6	Groups	Dannii Minogue	12th
Louise Adams	7	Over 25s	James Blunt	Runner-up
Michaela Baranov	7	Girls	Dannii Minogue	7th
Big T	7	Boys	Chris Isaak	4th
Natalie Conway	7	Over 25s	James Blunt	6th
Jimmy Davis	7	Boys	Chris Isaak	9th
Georgia Denton	7	Girls	Dannii Minogue	10th
The Fisher Boys	7	Groups	Guy Sebastian	11th
Dan Hamill	7	Over 25s	James Blunt	12th
In Stereo	7	Groups	Guy Sebastian	8th
Jess & Matt	7	Groups	Guy Sebastian	3rd
Mahalia Simpson	7	Girls	Dannii Minogue	5th
Cyrus Villanueva	7	Boys	Chris Isaak	Winner
AYA	8	Groups	Iggy Azelea	8th
Beatz	8	Underdogs	Mel B	5th
Brentwood	8	Groups	Iggy Azalea	7th
Isaiah Firebrace	8	14-21s	Adam Lambert	Winner
Amalia Foy	8	14-21s	Adam Lambert	4th
Timmy Knowles	8	Over 22s	Guy Sebastian	9-12th
Maddison Milewski	8	Underdogs	Mel B	9-12th
Natalie Ong	8	14-21s	Adam Lambert	9-12th
Chynna Taylor	8	Over 22s	Guy Sebastian	6th
Time And Place	8	Groups	Iggy Azelea	9-12th
Vlado	8	Underdogs	Mel B	3rd
Davey Woder	8	Over 22s	Guy Sebastian	Runner-Up

== Notes ==
- A Josh Brookes was disqualified when it was revealed that he "behaved in an inappropriate manner" on social media. He was later replaced by Carmelo Munzone.
