= The X Factor (Australian TV series) season 1 =

The X Factor
- Season 1
- Presented by: Daniel MacPherson; Chloe Maxwell
- Judges: Mark Holden; Kate Ceberano; John Reid
- Winner: Random
- Winning mentor: Mark Holden
- Runner-up: Russell Gooley

Release
- Original network: Network Ten
- Original release: 6 February – 15 May 2005

Season chronology
- Next → Season 2

The X Factor is an Australian television music competition to find new singing talent. The first season premiered on 6 February 2005 and ended on 15 May 2005. The show was cancelled after the series ended due to poor ratings, but was revived in 2010 after Seven Network acquired the rights through meetings with show creator Simon Cowell.

== Selection process ==
=== Masterclass ===
- 16-24s – Jack Byrnes, Gemma Purdy, Jacob Butler, Victoria McGee, Vincent Harder
- Over 25s – Roslynn Mahe, Cavan Te, Russell Gooley, Reegan Jolley, Jennifer Anderson, Janie Shrapnel
- Groups – 2XL, Beyond Society's Kontrol, Kaya, The Brothership, Random

=== Judges' Houses ===
The 7 eliminated acts were:

- 16-24s – Jack Byrnes, Victoria McGee
- Over 25s – Cavan Te, Jennifer Anderson, Reegan Jolley
- Groups – 2XL, Beyond Society's Kontrol

== Acts ==
Act	Age(s)	Hometown	Category (Mentor)	Result
Random	16–25	Brisbane, Queensland	Groups (Holden)	Winner
Russell Gooley	27	Narrogin, Western Australia	Over 25s (Reid)	Runner-Up
Vincent Harder	22	Bondi, New South Wales	16-24s (Ceberano)	3rd Place
Kaya	22–29	Sydney, New South Wales	Groups (Holden)	4th Place
Roslynn Mahe	30	Granville, New South Wales	Over 25s (Reid)	5th Place
Jacob Butler	22	Mount Gambier, South Australia	16-24s (Ceberano)	6th Place
Gemma Purdy	16	Nunawading, Victoria	16-24s (Ceberano)	7th Place
Janie Shrapnel	47	Samford, Queensland	Over 25s (Reid)	8th Place
The Brothership	29–33	Adelaide, South Australia	Groups (Holden)	9th Place

== Live Shows ==
Colour key

Act in 16-24s

Act in Over 25s

Act in Groups

Contestants' colour key:

– Act in the bottom two and had to perform again in the final showdown
– Act received the fewest public votes and was immediately eliminated (no final showdown)

Weekly results per act
Act	Week 1	Week 2	Week 3	Week 4	Week 5	Quarter-Final	Semi-Final	Final
Random	Safe	Safe	Safe	Safe	Safe	Safe	Safe	Winner (Final)
Russell Gooley	Safe	Safe	Safe	Safe	Safe	Safe	Safe	Runner-Up (Final)
Vincent Harder	Safe	Safe	Safe	Bottom; Two	Safe	Safe	3rd	Eliminated (Semi-Final)
Kaya	Safe	Safe	Safe	Safe	Bottom; Two	4th	Eliminated (Quarter-Final)	
Roslynn Mahe	Safe	Bottom; Two	Safe	Safe	Bottom two	Eliminated (Week 5)		
Jacob Butler	Safe	Safe	Bottom; Two	Bottom; Two	Eliminated (Week 4)			
Gemma Purdy	Safe	Safe	Bottom; Two	Eliminated (Week 3)				
Janie Shrapnel	Bottom; Two	Bottom; Two	Eliminated (Week 2)					
The Brothership	Bottom; Two	Eliminated (Week 1)						
Final Showdown	The Brothership, Shrapnel	Shrapnel, Mahe	Purdy, Butler	Butler, Harder	Mahe, Kaya	No bottom two/judges' vote; public votes alone decide who is eliminated.		
Reid's vote to eliminate (Over 25s)	The Brothership	Shrapnel	Butler	Butler	Kaya	No bottom two/judges' vote; public votes alone decide who is eliminated.		
Ceberano's vote to eliminate (16-24s)	The Brothership	Shrapnel	Purdy	Butler	Mahe	No bottom two/judges' vote; public votes alone decide who is eliminated.		
Holden's vote to eliminate (Groups)	Shrapnel	—N/a^{1}	Purdy	Harder	Mahe	No bottom two/judges' vote; public votes alone decide who is eliminated.		
Eliminated	The Brothership; 2 of 3 votes Majority	Janie Shrapnel; 2 of 2 votes Majority	Gemma Purdy; 2 of 3 votes Majority	Jacob Butler; 2 of 3 votes Majority	Roslynn Mahe; 2 of 3 votes Majority	Kaya; Public Vote To Save	Vincent Harder; Public Vote To Save	Russell Goolie; Public Vote To Win

Notes N/A^{1} Holden was not required to cast a vote as there was already a majority.
