= Universal (group) =

1990s boy band

Universal was an Australian-based boy band, from the 1990s. They released three singles on London Records with "Rock Me Good" and "Make It with You" both entering the Top 40 of the UK Singles Chart in 1997. When the third single failed to make in impact, the band dissolved.

== The Brothership ==
However, they reformed in 2005 in their hometown of Sydney, under the name 'The Brothership', and made it into the live show of the first ever The X-Factor, where they were mentored by Mark Holden. Holden won with another of his mentored groups called Random.

== Band members ==
- George Philippou
- Michael Philippou
- Adam Philippou

They are all brothers.

== Singles ==
- "Rock Me Good"
- "Make It with You"
- "Kill the Pain"
