= The X Factor (Australian TV series) =

Australian TV series

- Genre: Reality competition
- Created by: Simon Cowell
- Presented by: Daniel MacPherson; Luke Jacobz; Jason Dundas
- Judges: Kate Ceberano; Mark Holden; John Reid; Natalie Imbruglia; Ronan Keating; Kyle Sandilands; Guy Sebastian; Natalie Bassingthwaighte; Mel B; Dannii Minogue; Redfoo; James Blunt; Chris Isaak; Iggy Azalea; Adam Lambert
- Theme music composer: Jos Jorgensen; Andy Love; Simon Cowell
- Country of origin: Australia
- Original language: English
- No. of seasons: 8
- No. of episodes: 201

Production
- Executive producer: Jonathon Summerhayes Digby Mitchell
- Production locations: Various (auditions); Vodafone Arena, Melbourne, Victoria (2005 live shows); Fox Studios, Sydney, New South Wales (2010–2016 live shows)
- Running time: 60–120 minutes
- Production companies: Grundy Television (2005); FremantleMedia Australia (2010–2016)

Original release
- Network: Network Ten
- Release: 6 February – 15 May 2005
- Network: Seven Network
- Release: 30 August 2010 – 21 November 2016

Related
- The X Factor (British TV series); The X Factor (New Zealand TV series); The X Factor (American TV series)

The X Factor is an Australian television reality music competition, based on the original British series, to find new singing talent. The first season of the show premiered on Network Ten on 6 February 2005. Ten dropped The X Factor after the first season due to its poor ratings. In 2010, the Seven Network won the rights to the show, and a second season went into production. The X Factor was renewed after the highly successful Australian Idol was no longer broadcast on Network Ten. The X Factor was produced by FremantleMedia Australia, and was broadcast on the Seven Network in Australia and on TV3 in New Zealand. The program was cancelled after its eighth season in 2016.

The original judging panel line-up in 2005 consisted of Mark Holden, Kate Ceberano, and John Reid. When the show was revived in 2010, the judging panel was replaced by Natalie Imbruglia, Ronan Keating, Kyle Sandilands and Guy Sebastian. Imbruglia and Sandilands did not return for season three and were replaced by Natalie Bassingthwaighte and Mel B. Redfoo and Dannii Minogue joined the panel in season five as replacements for Sebastian and Mel B. Sebastian returned to the panel in season seven along with new judges James Blunt and Chris Isaak, as replacements for Keating, Bassingthwaighte and Redfoo. The eighth season featured Guy Sebastian, Iggy Azalea, Adam Lambert and Mel B as judges, with Mel B serving as the "Underdog Judge".

During the televised audition phases of The X Factor, originally the contestants sang in an "audition room" in front of only the judges, however, from season two onwards all auditionees sing on stage in an arena, in front of the judges and a live audience. The successful acts then progress to the next stage of the competition, "bootcamp" and later "home visits", where the judges narrow their category down to three acts who continued to the live shows, where the public vote for their favourite act, following weekly performances by the contestants.

There have been eight winners: Random, Altiyan Childs, Reece Mastin, Samantha Jade, Dami Im, Marlisa Punzalan, Cyrus Villanueva and Isaiah Firebrace. Winners received a recording contract with record label Sony Music Australia. In season three, the winner also received a management contract, and in season four, a Nissan Dualis car. Each winning contestant's single has charted within the top-ten of the ARIA Singles Chart, only Mastin's, Jade's and Im's singles have reached number one. There have also been a number of hit singles released by other contestants who have appeared on The X Factor. The show has received numerous awards and nominations, including five Logie Award nominations, of which it has won one for Most Outstanding Light Entertainment Program.

== History ==
The X Factor was created by Simon Cowell in the United Kingdom and is based on the original British series. Cowell then began to grow and expand The X Factor competition franchise and in 2005, the Australian version of the show was launched on Network Ten, the same channel as the highly successful Australian Idol. However, due to poor ratings Network Ten dropped The X Factor after one season.

In 2010, once the seventh and final season of Australian Idol was completed, it was announced that Seven Network went into a "bidding war" with Nine Network to obtain the rights of The X Factor, which they later won and a second season went into production. Networks Seven and Nine both began the bidding war after expressing interest by attending a conference organised by Cowell. Andrew Backwell, Nine Network's director of production and development, and Tim Worner of Network Seven's head of programming, both attended the conference. Cowell wanted the Australian version to match his "own specifications", and said that it would cost at least $20 million for 21 hours of television. The X Factor was originally set to return in February 2011, but began in August 2010.

In February 2016, reports claimed that Seven was mulling over whether or not to delay the series' planned eighth season until 2017. It was later confirmed that The X Factor will return in 2016. The season premiered on 3 October 2016. Towards the end of the eighth season, there was speculation that The X Factor would not return in 2017 due to poor ratings. A spokesman from Seven advised that the decision will be made in early 2017. Seven confirmed the program had been axed in January 2017.

== Format ==
The X Factor was primarily concerned with identifying singing talent, through appearance, personality, and stage presence. Dance routines were also important elements of many performances. Throughout the live shows, the judges acted as mentors to their category, helping to decide song choices, styling and staging, while judging contestants from other categories. For each season, each judge was assigned a category and they mentored their three acts individually, with all acts having a shared amount of time with their mentor. Each of the 12 acts also had rehearsal time in the studio with their mentor. In some cases, if a solo artist was not strong enough, the judges would put together a group of solo artists which had potential to be great as a band. In season six only, a wildcard was introduced to add one more act to the live shows, thus making it 13 contestants.

=== Categories ===
In season 1, the show was split into three categories: 16-24s, Over 25s and Groups. In seasons 2-7, the 16-24s category was split into separate male and female sections, making four categories in all: Boys, Girls, Over 25s, and Groups. In season 3 onwards, the minimum age for the Boys and Girls categories was lowered to 14. In season 5 only, the Over 25s was changed to Over 24s. In season 6, It was changed back to Over 25s for series 6, In Season 8, the Over 25s was changed to Over 22s, Boys and Girls has been defunct and making the 14-21s to come back, Bands are now able to audition, any can play instruments - they will be part of the Groups category.

=== Stages ===
There were five stages to the competition:

- Stage 1: Open auditions: these auditions decided who would sing in front of the judges (season 2–8)
- Stage 2: Judges' auditions
- Stage 3: Masterclass (season 1), bootcamp (season 2–6) or seat challenge (season 7–8)
- Stage 4: Judges' houses (season 1) or super home visits (season 2–7)
- Stage 5: Live shows (finals)

For the first season, the judges' auditions, masterclass, the judges' houses and the live finals were the four stages to the competition. For the revived second season, the stages changed to open auditions, judges' auditions, bootcamp, super home visits and the live shows. This remained unchanged until season 8, when the stages changed to open auditions, judges' auditions, three seat challenge and the live shows.

=== Auditions ===
In the first round, the first set of auditions were held in front of the show's producers, months before The X Factor was aired. The open auditions were not televised and anyone could attend. The successful auditionees chosen by the producers were invited back to the last set of the audition phase, which took place in front of the show's judging panel and a live audience. If there were three judges present during the auditions, the act needed at least two "yes" votes (three if there were four judges present) to gain the majority vote. The judges' auditions were held on selected dates and locations in a number of major cities of Australia, and were broadcast over the first few weeks of The X Factor. The show was open to solo artists and vocal groups aged 14 and above, with no upper age limit. Only a selection of auditions in front of the judges were broadcast, usually the best, the worst and the most bizarre. During the first season of The X Factor, each act entered an audition room and delivered a stand-up unaccompanied performance of their chosen song to the judges, without any instrumental music playing.

=== Bootcamp and super home visits ===
In the second round, participants who reach this stage are sent to a "bootcamp" to refine their performances, while they are organised into categories based on the conditions of their application. The first category consists of men and women solo contestants aged under 24 – both genders were conjoined in early series until split into individual gender in the second series – with the minimum age allowed being 16 (except for the second to eighth series where it was lowered to 14). The second category consists of men and women solo acts aged 25 and older (with the exception of one series where the minimum age was raised to 24 in season 5 and 22 in season 8).

During the bootcamp stage (formerly lock down in season 1, and super bootcamp in seasons 4–6), each judge was assigned one of the four categories to mentor. It was usually held on three days. In seasons 1, 2 and 3, each judge was given 24 acts and had to decide on their 12 acts after day two, and their six acts after day three. Each judge was assisted by a celebrity guest judge who would help them choose their acts. In season one, the judges narrowed down their acts to five instead of six. In seasons 4, 5 and 6, all four judges worked together to collectively choose 24 acts (six from each category) for the next round, home visits, where they find out which category they will mentor. From season 7, bootcamp were now based around the five seat challenge, where each judge chose their five acts to go through to the super home visits.

From seasons 1 to 7, the super home visits stage (formerly judges' houses in seasons 1–2, and home visits in seasons 3–6), saw the judges and their remaining six acts travel to four different places of the world. From season seven, all four judges and their remaining five acts traveled to the same location. During the super home visits, each act performed one song in front of their mentor and celebrity guest judges. Afterwards, each mentor and their guest judges narrowed down the acts to three for the live shows.

=== Live shows and winner's prize ===
The finals consisted of two live shows, the first featuring the contestants' performances and the second revealing the results of the public voting, culminating in one/two acts being eliminated each week. The live shows were filmed at Fox Studios in Sydney. In season 1, the shows were filmed at Hisense Arena (formerly Vodafone Arena) in Melbourne. In season two, the live shows were broadcast on Sunday and Monday nights, but moved to Monday and Tuesday nights for seasons three and four. In season five, the live shows returned to Sunday and Monday nights. In season seven, the live shows were once again broadcast on Monday and Tuesday nights.

In the initial performance shows, each act performed one song (two songs each during the Semi-Final and three songs each during the Grand Final) in front of the judges and a studio audience. The acts usually sung over a pre-recorded backing track, and backup dancers were commonly featured as well as stage props. Acts occasionally accompanied themselves on guitar or piano. From the second season, each performance show had a different theme; each act's song was chosen according to the theme. The acts' mentors picked the song for them and critiqued their performance in order to get it perfect for the live shows. A celebrity guest connected to the theme was often invited onto The X Factor, and clips were shown of the guest conversing with the contestants at rehearsal. After each act had performed, the judges commented on their performance. Once all the acts had performed, the phone lines opened and the viewing public voted on which act they wanted to keep in the competition.

The results were announced during the live decider show the following day, in aid to give the Australian public time to vote. The two acts that received the lowest number of votes performed again in the "final showdown", and the judges voted on which of the two to send home. In the first season, there would never be an even number, therefore one act would always be eliminated by a majority. However, once a fourth judge was added to the panel, this was possible and "deadlock" was introduced in case of a tie vote. If the final showdown got to deadlock, the act with the lowest number of votes was eliminated from the competition. The actual number of votes cast for each act was not revealed, nor was the order. The results show also featured a number of celebrity guest performers promoting their singles or albums, usually their latest ones. The winner of The X Factor was awarded a $1,000,000 recording contract with Sony Music Australia. In season three, the winner was also awarded a management contract, and in season four, a Nissan Dualis car.

== Series overview ==
| Series | No. of episodes | Originally aired | | Winner ^{1} | Runner-up ^{1} | Winning mentor |
| Series | No. of episodes | First aired | Last aired | Winner ^{1} | Runner-up ^{1} | Winning mentor |
|---|---|---|---|---|---|---|
| 1 | 27 | 6 February 2005 | 15 May 2005 | Random; Groups | Russell Gooley; Over 25s | Mark Holden |
| 2 | 28 | 30 August 2010 | 22 November 2010 | Altiyan Childs; Over 25s | Sally Chatfield; Girls | Ronan Keating |
| 3 | 32 | 29 August 2011 | 22 November 2011 | Reece Mastin; Boys | Andrew Wishart; Over 25s | Guy Sebastian |
| 4 | 33 | 20 August 2012 | 20 November 2012 | Samantha Jade; Over 25s | Jason Owen; Boys | Guy Sebastian |
| 5 | 32 | 29 July 2013 | 28 October 2013 | Dami Im; Over 24s | Taylor Henderson; Boys | Dannii Minogue |
| 6 | 34 | 13 July 2014 | 20 October 2014 | Marlisa; Girls | Dean Ray; Boys | Ronan Keating |
| 7 | 28 | 13 September 2015 | 24 November 2015 | Cyrus Villanueva; Boys | Louise Adams; Over 25s | Chris Isaak |
| 8 | 19 | 3 October 2016 | 21 November 2016 | Isaiah Firebrace; 14-21s | Davey Woder; Over 22s | Adam Lambert |

== Judges and hosts ==
=== Judges ===
Judges on The X Factor Australia
| Judge | Season | | | | | | | |
| Judge | 1 | 2 | 3 | 4 | 5 | 6 | 7 | 8 |
|---|---|---|---|---|---|---|---|---|
| Mark Holden | | | | | | | | |
| Kate Ceberano | | | | | | | | |
| John Reid | | | | | | | | |
| Guy Sebastian | | | | | | | | |
| Ronan Keating | | | | | | | | |
| Natalie Imbruglia | | | | | | | | |
| Kyle Sandilands | | | | | | | | |
| Natalie Bassingthwaighte | | | | | | | | |
| Mel B | | | | | | | | |
| Dannii Minogue | | | | | | | | |
| Redfoo | | | | | | | | |
| James Blunt | | | | | | | | |
| Chris Isaak | | | | | | | | |
| Iggy Azalea | | | | | | | | |
| Adam Lambert | | | | | | | | |

| Season | 1 | 2 | 3 | 4 |
|---|---|---|---|---|
| 1 | Mark Holden | Kate Ceberano | John Reid | |
| 2 | Guy Sebastian | Natalie Imbruglia | Ronan Keating | Kyle Sandilands |
| 3 | Guy Sebastian | Natalie Bassingthwaighte | Ronan Keating | Mel B |
| 4 | Guy Sebastian | Natalie Bassingthwaighte | Ronan Keating | Mel B |
| 5 | Redfoo | Natalie Bassingthwaighte | Ronan Keating | Dannii Minogue |
| 6 | Redfoo | Natalie Bassingthwaighte | Ronan Keating | Dannii Minogue |
| 7 | Guy Sebastian | Chris Isaak | James Blunt | Dannii Minogue |
| 8 | Guy Sebastian | Iggy Azalea | Adam Lambert | Mel B |

The X Factor debuted in 2005 with Australian recording artist Kate Ceberano, record producer Mark Holden, and Scottish events manager John Reid as the judges. Ceberano's judging skills were compared to X Factor UK judge, Sharon Osbourne. When it was announced that The X Factor would return in 2010, British reality television star Peter Andre was linked to the role. However, he declined the offer as he did not want to be away from his children for so long. The judging line up was announced in May 2010 with Irish recording artist Ronan Keating, radio presenter Kyle Sandilands, and Australian recording artists Guy Sebastian and Natalie Imbruglia. On 16 March 2011, Sandilands announced that he would not be returning for season 3, stating that he left the show because "it's just too hectic, it's too much work". On 27 April 2011, the Seven Network confirmed that Mel B would be Sandilands' replacement, and Natalie Bassingthwaighte was confirmed as Imbruglia's replacement on 6 May 2011. Bassingthwaighte said she would focus on bringing an honest critique to the show and will guide "the artists through the competition", while Mel B said, "[The contestants] are either going to love me or hate me but it's going to be a fun ride. I'm really easy to get on with and I'm a hard worker. I'm firm but nice." Keating, Sebastian, Bassingthwaighte and Mel B returned for the fourth season in 2012.

In March 2013, Keating confirmed in an interview with News Limited that Sebastian and Mel B had left the show, but stated that he wanted them to return. Dannii Minogue was announced as Mel B's replacement on 12 April 2013, and Redfoo was announced as Sebastian's replacement on 21 April 2013. Minogue, Redfoo, Bassingthwaigte and Keating returned for season 6 in 2014. In April 2015, Keating and Bassingthwaighte announced that they would not be returning for the season 7 in 2015. Redfoo also announced his departure the following month. On 3 May 2015, it was announced that Sebastian would be returning to the panel along with two new judges James Blunt and Chris Isaak. Minogue was the only judge from the previous season who returned. On 12 June 2016, Iggy Azalea was announced as a new judge for the series. On 20 June 2016, Guy Sebastian was confirmed to be returning as a judge. The following day, Adam Lambert was announced as the third judge for season 8. In October 2016, it was confirmed that former judge Mel B would be joining the show as the fourth and final judge for season 8, as "The Underdog Judge".

Judges gallery

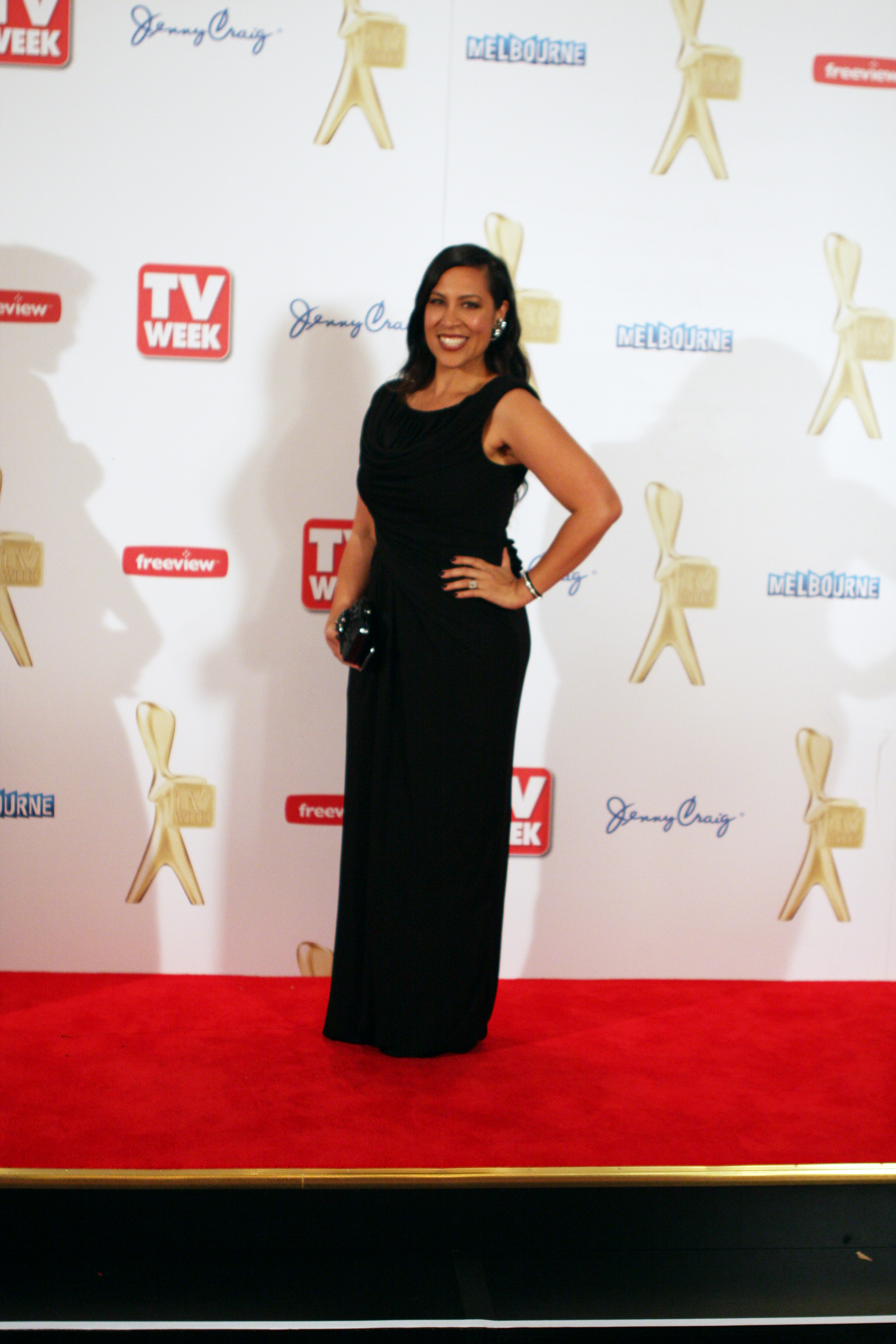
Kate Ceberano (2005)

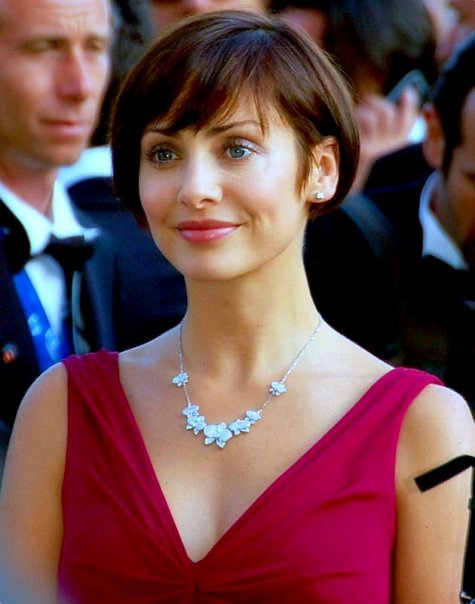
Natalie Imbruglia (2010)

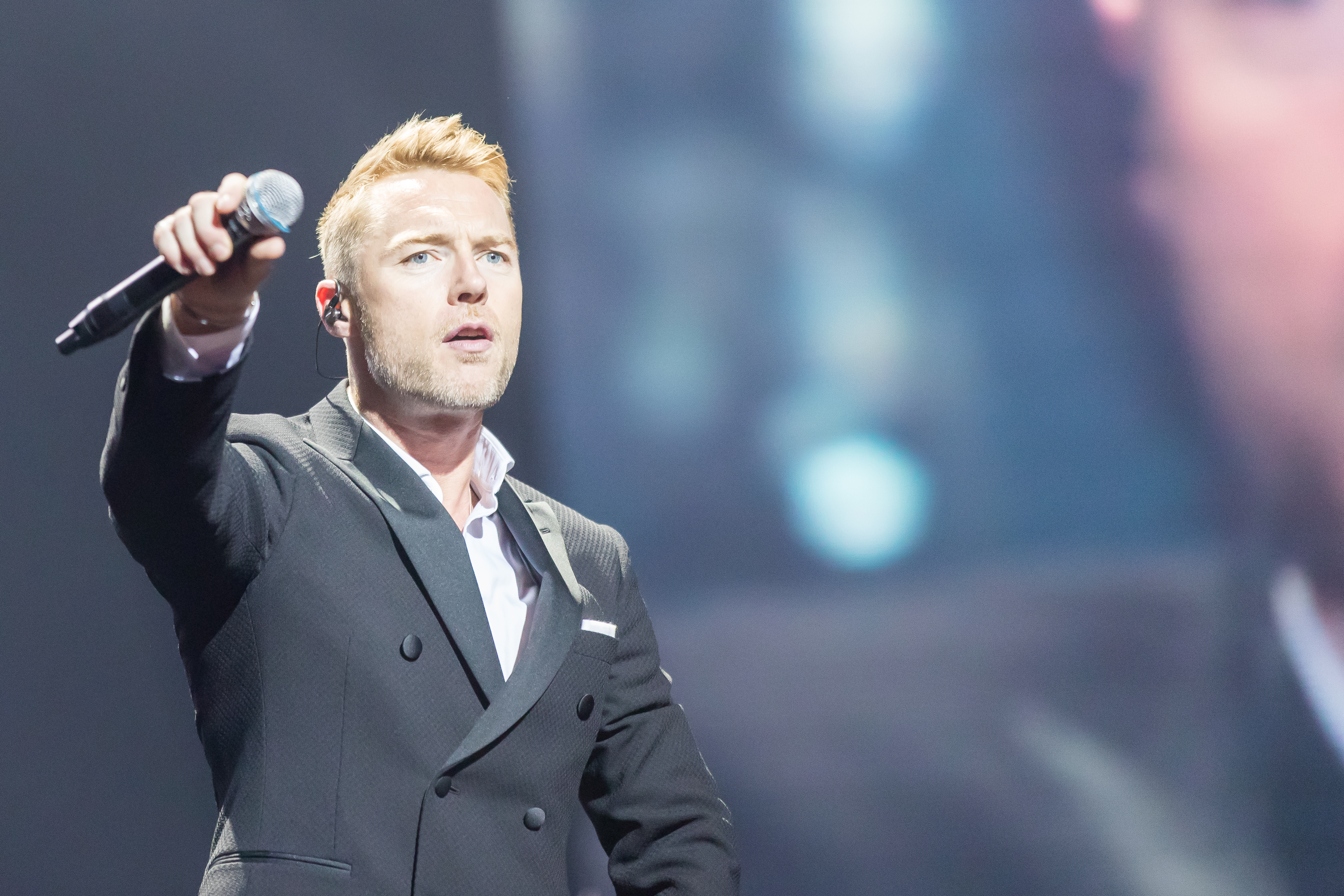
Ronan Keating (2010–2014)

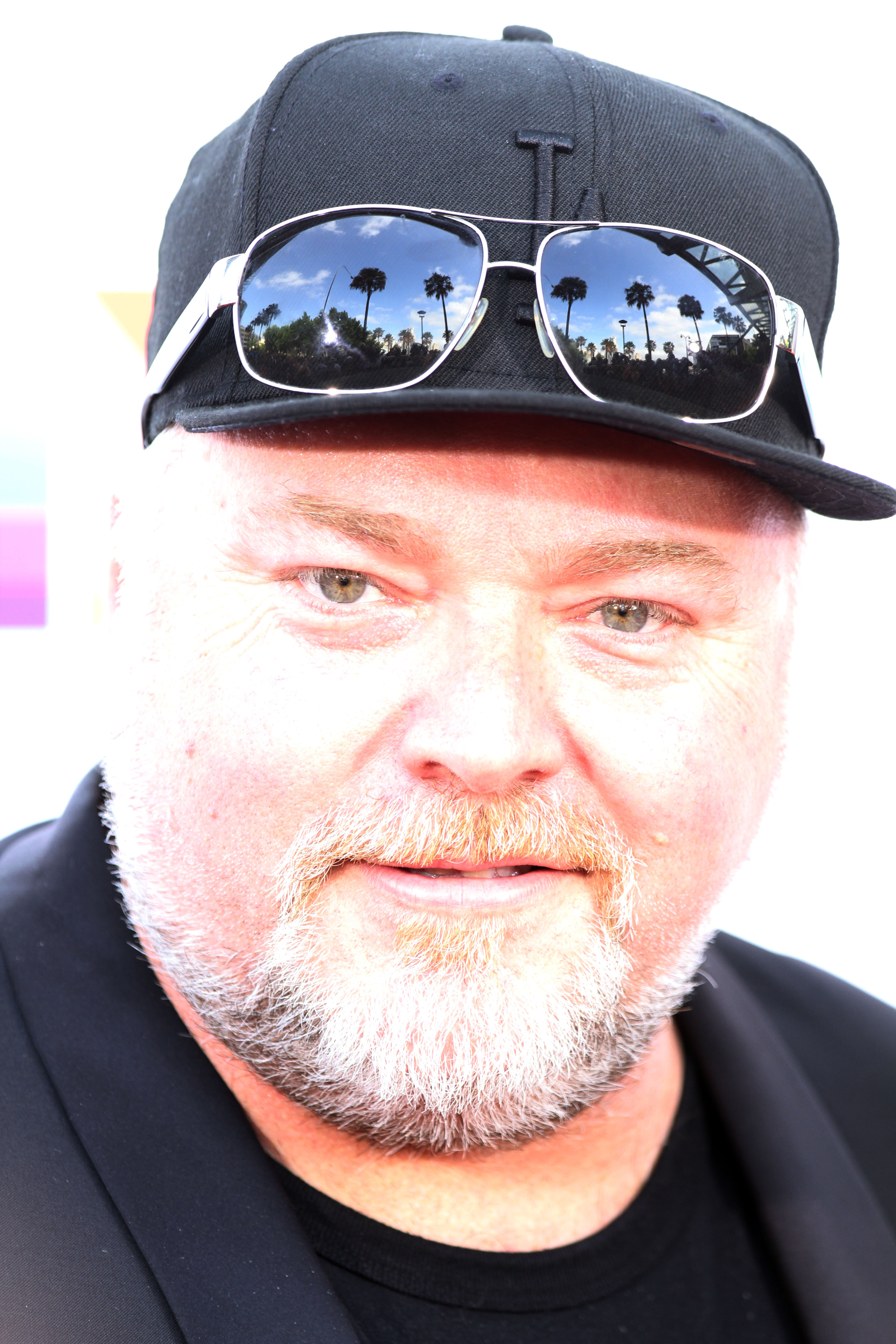
Kyle Sandilands (2010)

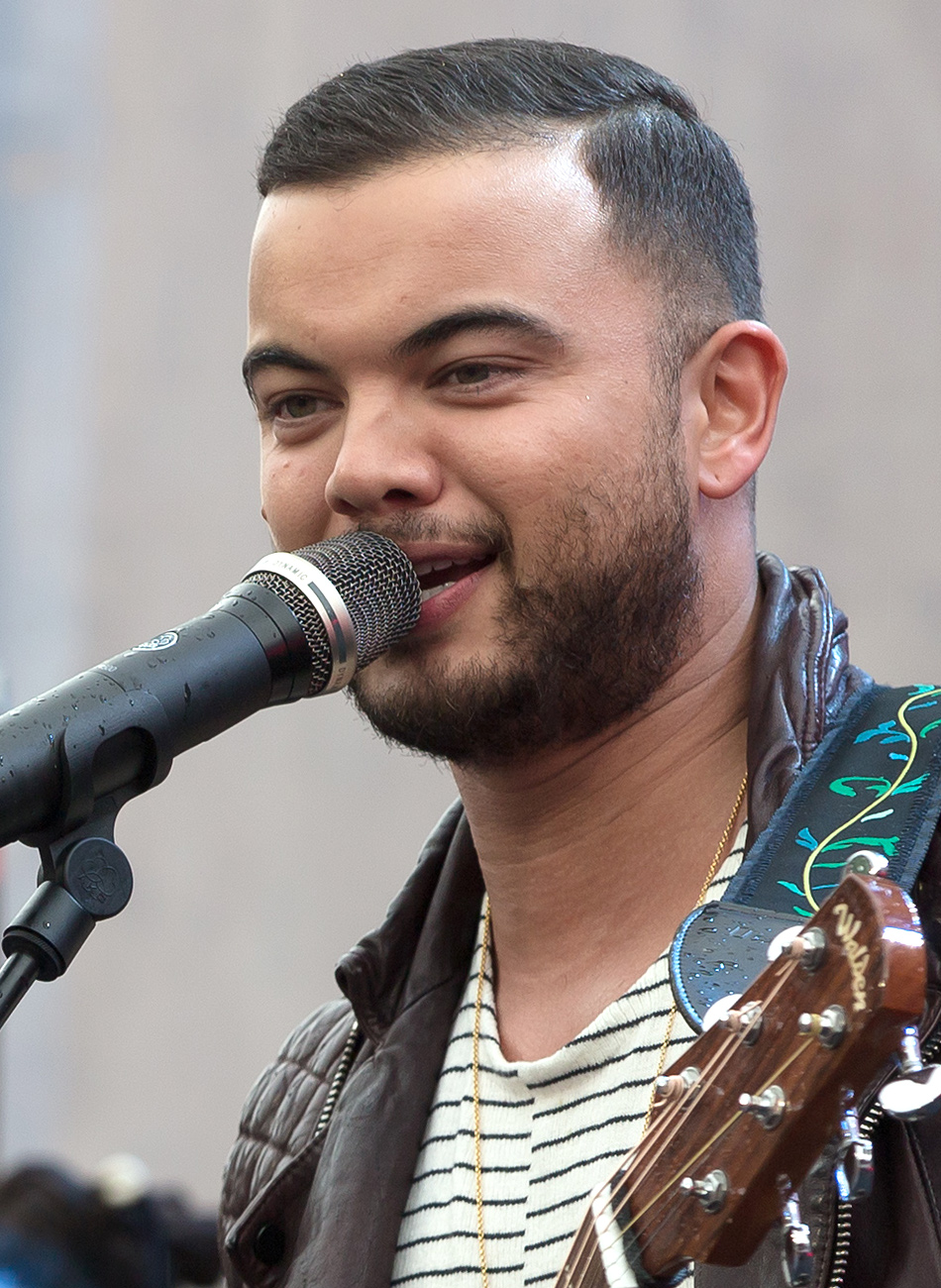
Guy Sebastian (2010–2012, 2015–2016)

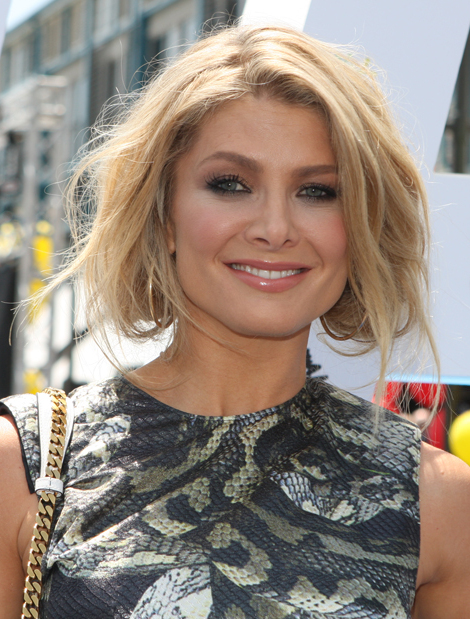
Natalie Bassingthwaighte (2011–2014)

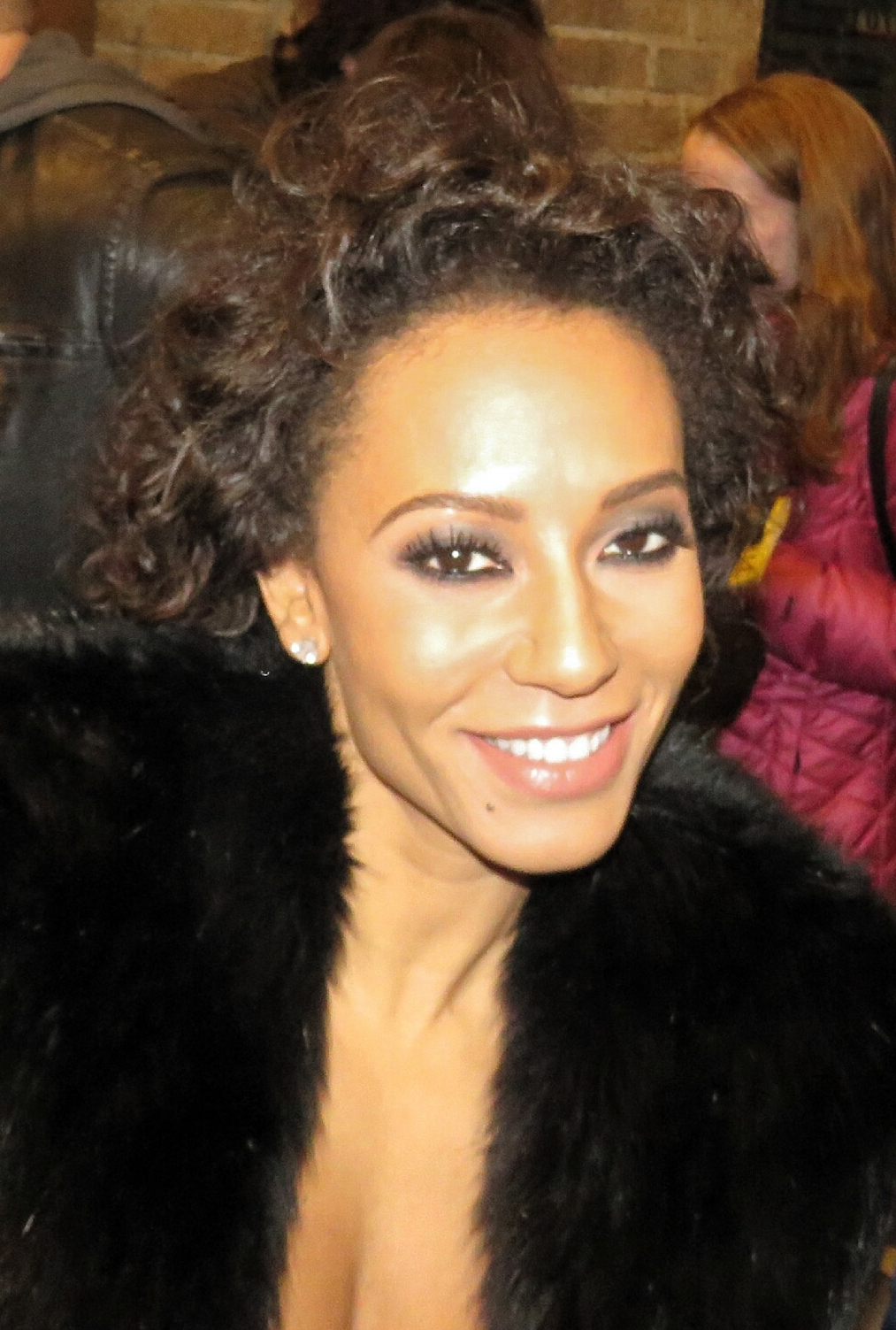
Mel B (2011–2012, 2016)

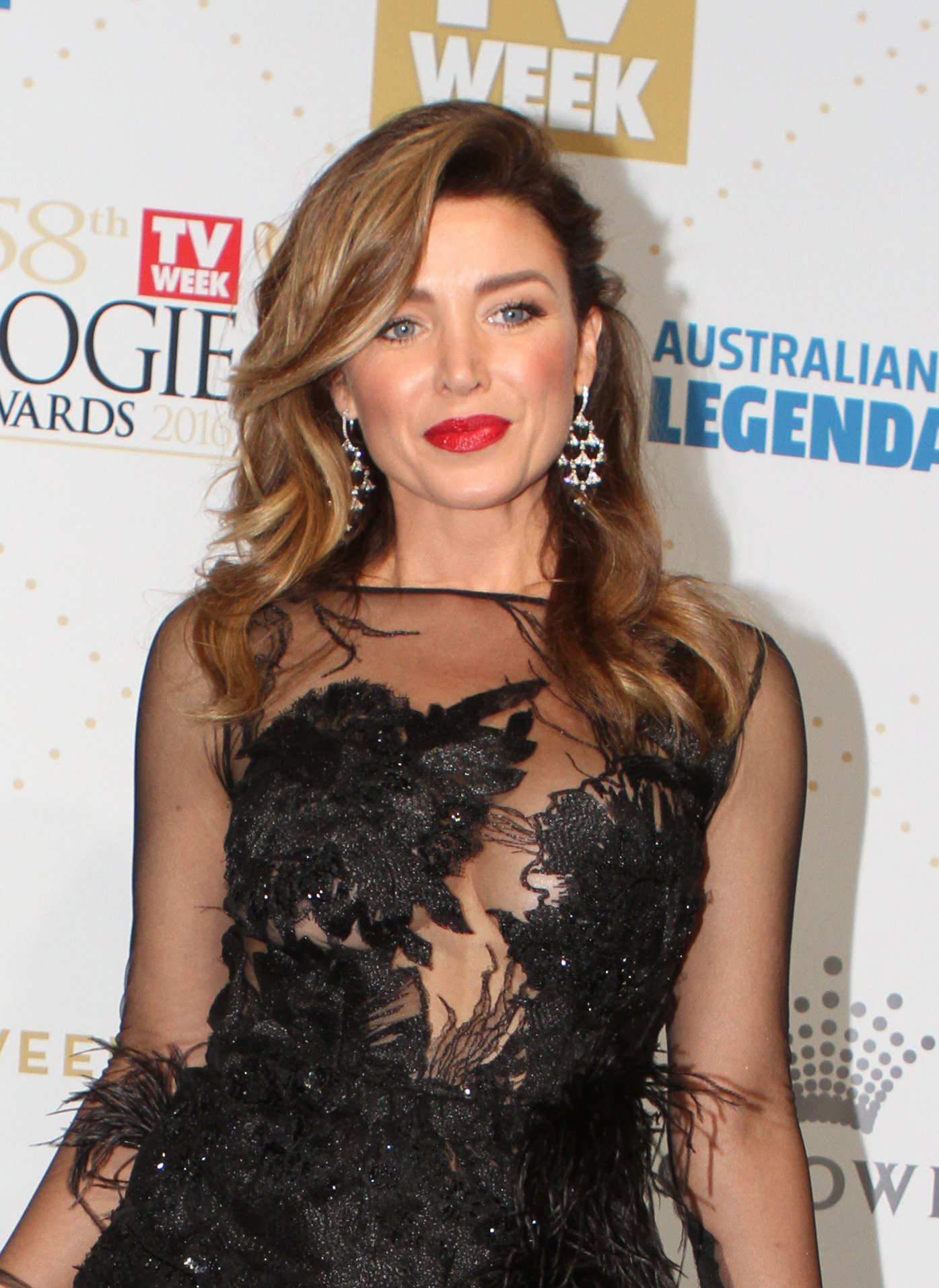
Dannii Minogue (2013–2015)

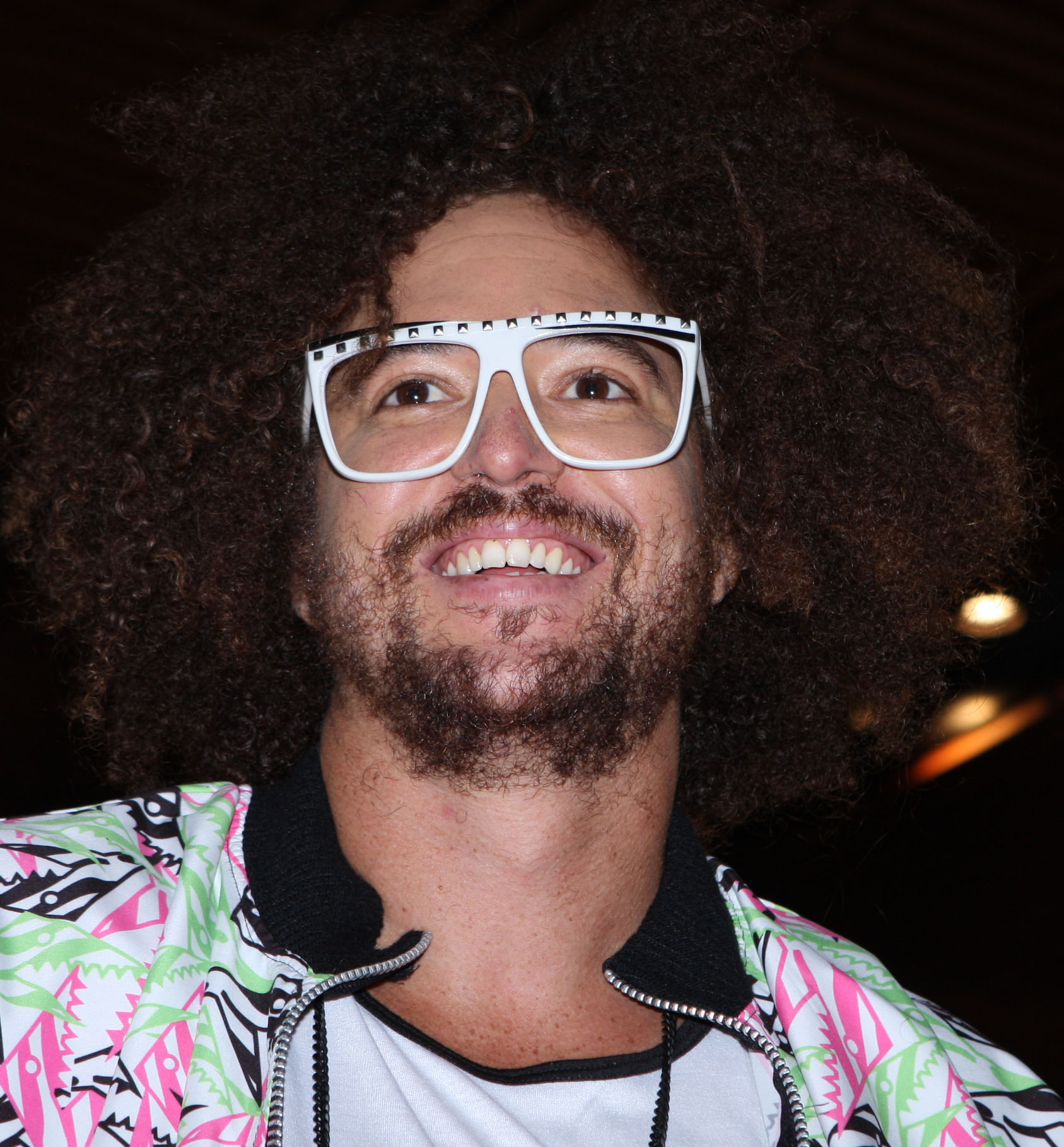
Redfoo (2013–2014)

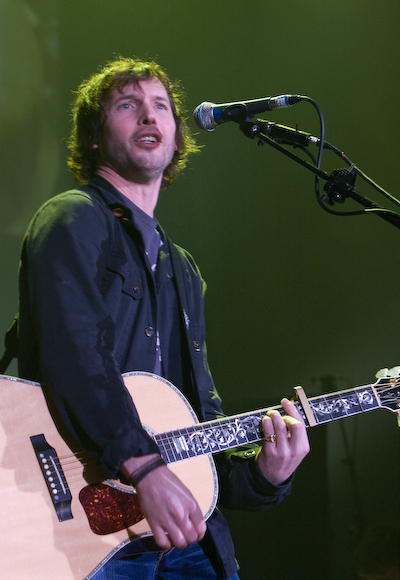
James Blunt (2015)

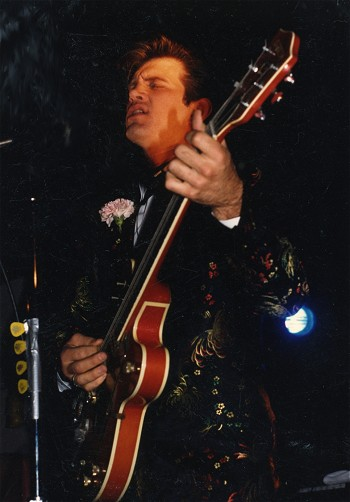
Chris Isaak (2015)

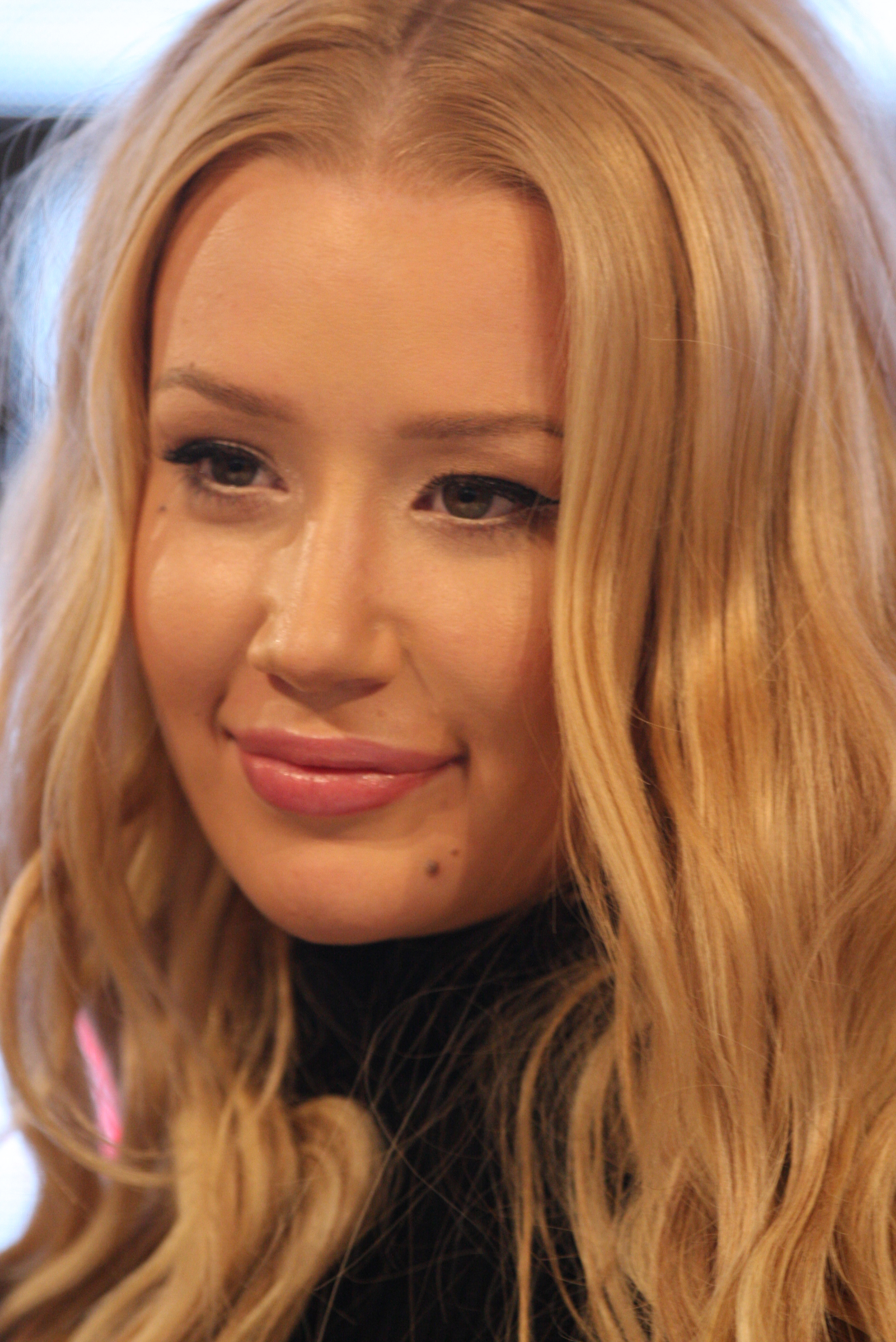
Iggy Azalea (2016)

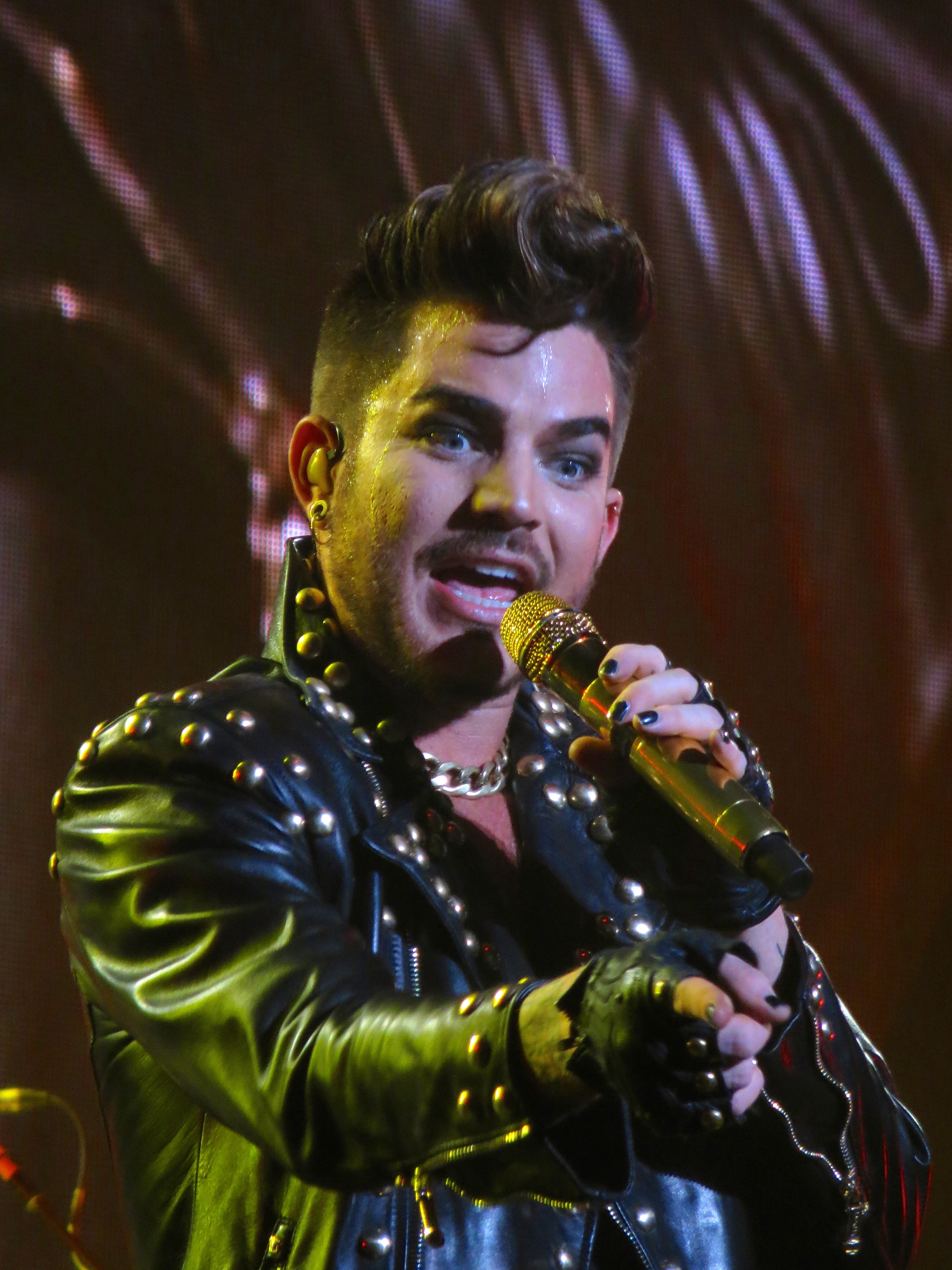
Adam Lambert (2016)

=== Hosts and other personnel ===
When The X Factor began in 2005, Daniel MacPherson was the main host of the show and Chloe Maxwell was the host of the spin-off show, The Xtra Factor. Following the announcement that The X Factor was returning in 2010, the Herald Sun reported that MacPherson was favourite to fill the hosting role but was unable to commit because of his duties on Dancing with the Stars. On 30 May 2010, actor Matthew Newton was announced as the host. However, on 22 August 2010, it was revealed that Newton had to withdraw after an altercation in Rome with his now ex-girlfriend Rachael Taylor. Newton flew from Rome to Dublin, where he was to film segments for The X Factor with Keating. However, he was escorted back to Australia by a producer of the show after they decided he was in no state to film. He was then checked into Wentworthville's Northside West Clinic.

On 23 August 2010, it was announced that actor Luke Jacobz would take over as host and all original audition footage with Newton was removed with footage of Jacobz being shot instead. On 28 August 2010, it was announced that radio presenter Natalie Garonzi would host The Xtra Factor on 7Two. Season three finalist Johnny Ruffo joined the fourth season live shows as the host of the online live streaming show, The X Stream. Comedy duo Luke & Wyatt joined the sixth season live shows as the hosts of the online show, The Fan Factor. On 24 November 2015, Jacobz announced on his Twitter account that he would not be returning as the host for the eighth season in 2016. On 25 June 2016, Jason Dundas was announced as Jacobz's replacement.

Hosts gallery

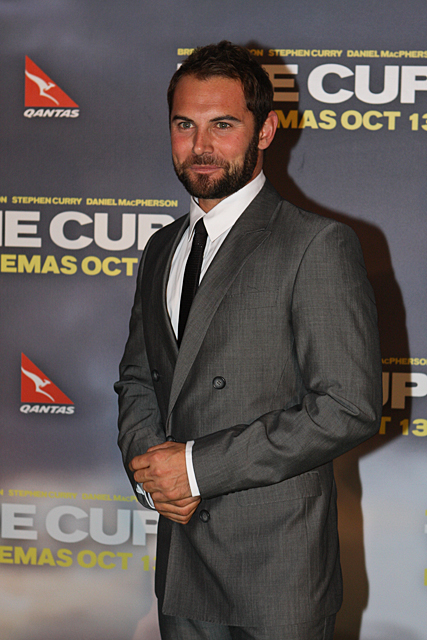
Daniel MacPherson (2005)

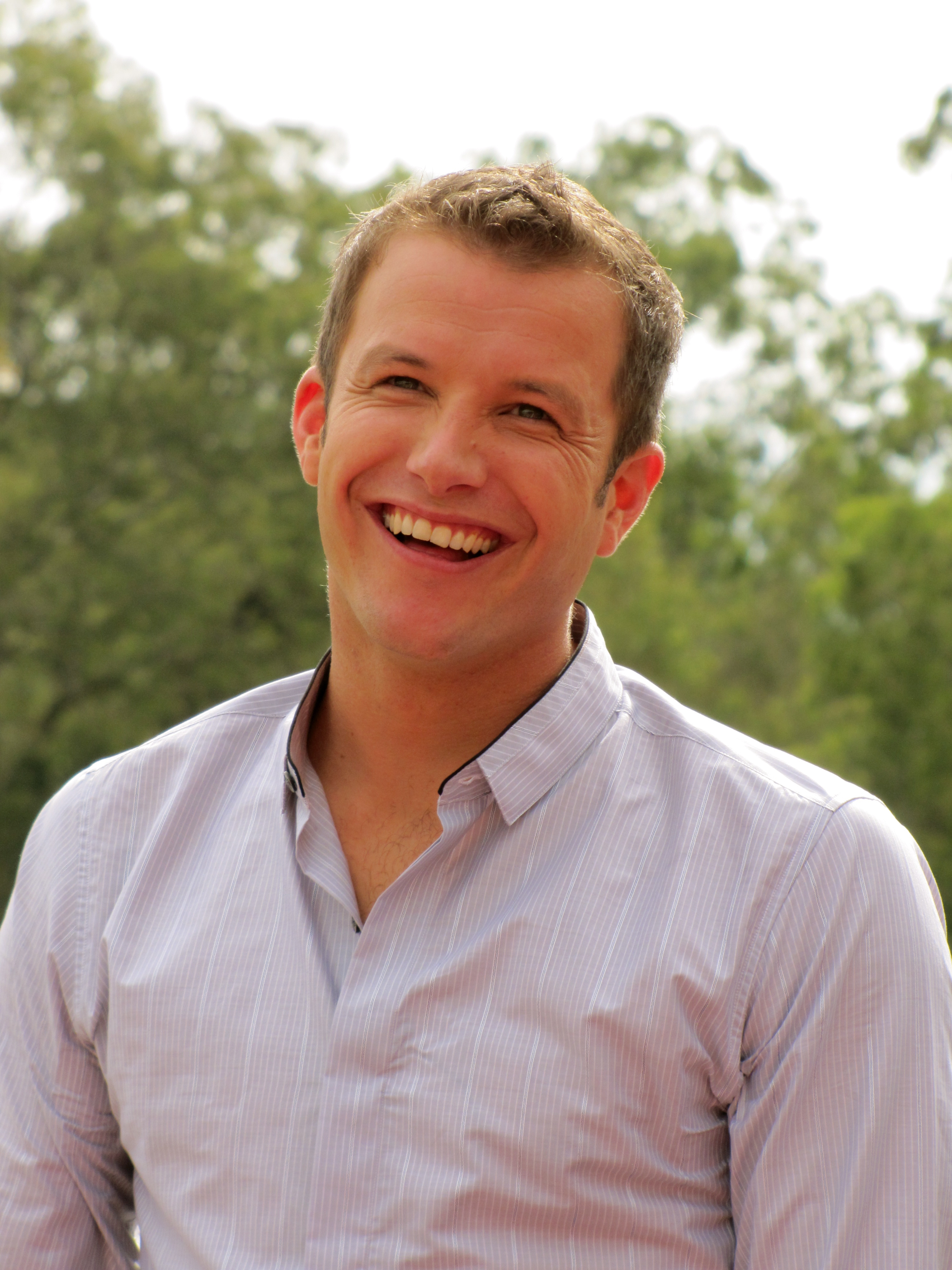
Luke Jacobz (2010–2015)

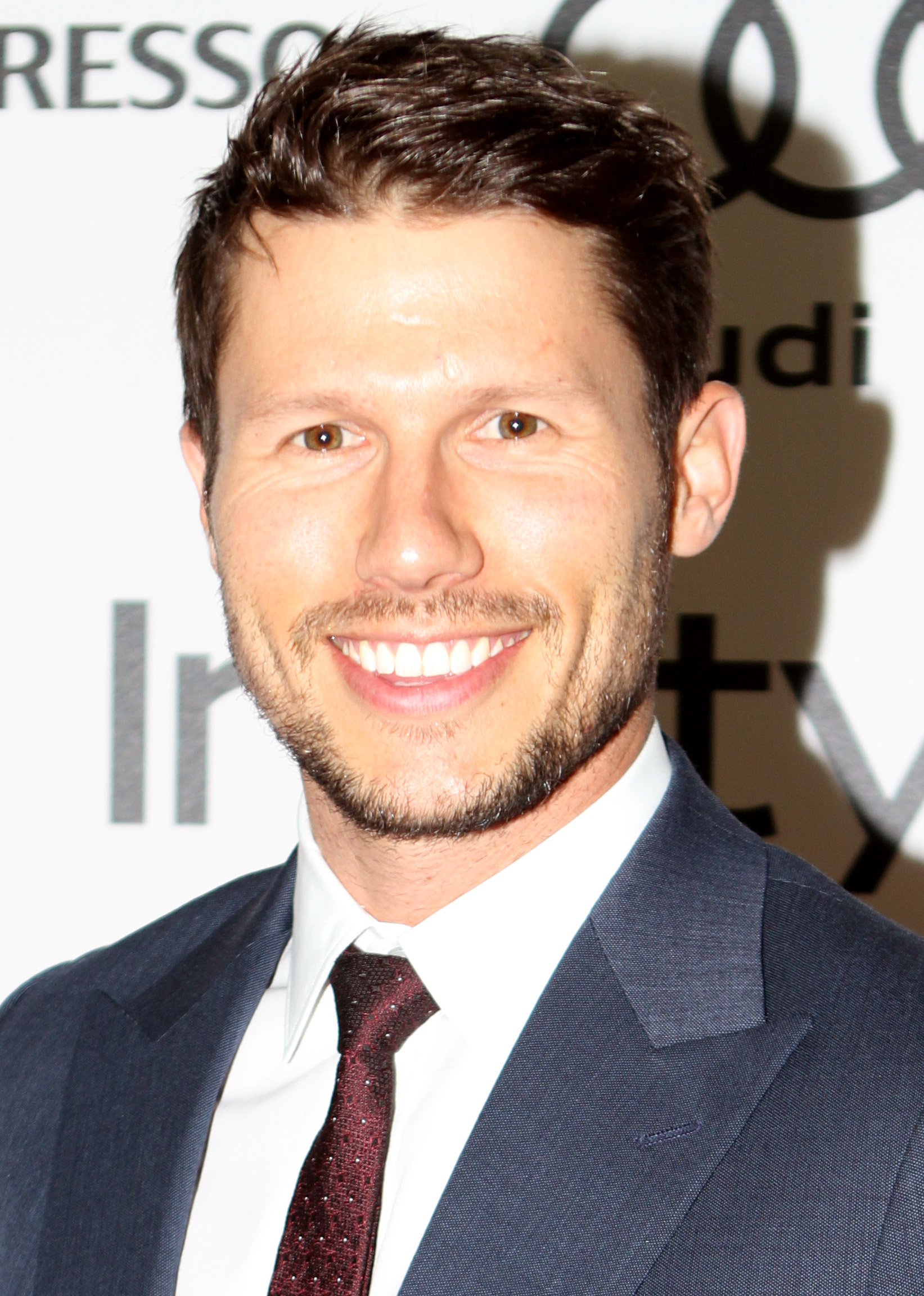
Jason Dundas (2016)

=== Judges' categories and their contestants ===
In each season, each judge is allocated a category to mentor and chooses a small number of acts (three acts) to progress to the live finals. This table shows, for each season, which category each judge was allocated and which acts he or she put through to the live finals.

– Winning judge/category. Winners are in bold, eliminated contestants in small font.

| Season | John Reid | Kate Ceberano | Mark Holden | —N/a |
|---|---|---|---|---|
| 1 | **Over 25s** Russell Gooley; Roslynn Mahe; Janie Shrapnel | **16-24s** Vincent Harder; Jacob Butler; Gemma Purdy | **Groups**; **Random**; Kaya; The Brothership | —N/a |
| 2 | Ronan Keating | Natalie Imbruglia | Guy Sebastian | Kyle Sandilands |
| 2 | **Over 25s** **Altiyan Childs**; Amanda Grafanakis; James McNally | **Girls**; Sally Chatfield; Hayley Teal; India-Rose Madderom | **Groups**; Mahogany; Luke and Joel; Kharizma | **Boys**; Andrew Lawson; Mitchell Smith; Chris Doe |
| 3 | Ronan Keating | Natalie Bassingthwaighte | Guy Sebastian | Mel B |
| 3 | **Groups**; Three Wishez; Young Men Society; Audio Vixen | **Over 25s** Andrew Wishart; Mitchell Callaway; Cleo Howman | **Boys**; **Reece Mastin**; Johnny Ruffo †; Declan Sykes | **Girls**; Christina Parie; Jacqui Newland; Tyla Bertolli |
| 4 | **Groups**; The Collective; Fourtunate; What About Tonight | **Girls**; Bella Ferraro; Shiane Hawke; Angel Tupai | **Over 25s** **Samantha Jade**; Nathaniel Willemse; Justin Standley | **Boys**; Jason Owen; Carmelo Munzone; Josh Brookes; Adil Memon |
| 5 | Ronan Keating | Natalie Bassingthwaighte | Dannii Minogue | Redfoo |
| 5 | **Boys**; Taylor Henderson; Jai Waetford; Omar Dean | **Groups**; Third Degree; JTR; Adira-Belle | **Over 24s** **Dami Im**; Barry Southgate; Cat Vas | **Girls**; Jiordan Tolli; Joelle Hadjia; Ellie Lovegrove |
| 6 | **Girls**; **Marlisa Punzalan**; Caitlyn Shadbolt; Sydnee Carter | **Boys**; Dean Ray; Tee; Adrien Nookadu | **Groups**; Brothers3; XOX; Younger Than Yesterday; Trill | **Over 25s** Reigan Derry; Jason Heerah; Rochelle Pitt |
| 7 | Guy Sebastian | James Blunt | Dannii Minogue | Chris Isaak |
| 7 | **Groups**; Jess & Matt; In Stereo; The Fisher Boys | **Over 25s** Louise Adams; Natalie Conway; Dan Hamill | **Girls**; Mahalia Simpson; Michaela Baranov; Georgia Denton | **Boys**; **Cyrus Villanueva**; Big T Jimmy Davis |
| 8 | Adam Lambert | Iggy Azalea | Guy Sebastian | Mel B |
| 8 | **14-21s** **Isaiah Firebrace**; Amalia Foy; Natalie Ong | **Groups**; Brentwood; AYA; Time and Place | **Over 22s** Davey Woder; Chynna Taylor; Timmy Knowles | **Underdogs**; Vlado; Beatz; Maddison Milewski |

== Reception ==
=== Viewership ===
| Season | Episodes | Premiere | | | Finale | | | | | Average viewers (in millions) |
| Season | Episodes | Date | Premiere Viewers (in millions) | Rank | Date | Live Decider Viewers (in millions) | Rank | Winner Announced Viewers (in millions) | Rank | Average viewers (in millions) |
|---|---|---|---|---|---|---|---|---|---|---|
| One | 27 | 6 February 2005 | 1.453 | —N/a | 15 May 2005 | —N/a | | | | |
| Two | 28 | 30 August 2010 | 1.186 | #5 | 22 November 2010 | 1.363 | #3 | 1.632 | #1 | —N/a |
| Three | 32 | 29 August 2011 | 1.319 | #1 | 22 November 2011 | 1.721 | #2 | 1.998 | #1 | —N/a |
| Four | 33 | 20 August 2012 | 1.598 | #1 | 20 November 2012 | 1.881 | #2 | 1.921 | #1 | 1.50 |
| Five | 32 | 29 July 2013 | 1.633 | #1 | 28 October 2013 | 2.251 | #2 | 2.431 | #1 | 1.56 |
| Six | 34 | 13 July 2014 | 1.226 | #2 | 20 October 2014 | 1.378 | #2 | 1.428 | #1 | 1.14 |
| Seven | 28 | 13 September 2015 | 1.506 | #1 | 24 November 2015 | 1.045 | #2 | 1.204 | #1 | —N/a |
| Eight | 19 | 3 October 2016 | 0.904 | #6 | 21 November 2016 | 0.751 | #11 | —N/a | | —N/a |

=== Awards and nominations ===
| Year | Type | Award | Result |
|---|---|---|---|
| 2010 | TV Tonight Awards | Best Reality (Australian) | Nominated |
| 2010 | Poprepublic.tv IT List Awards | Australian TV Show | Won |
| 2011 | Logie Awards | Most Popular Reality Program | Nominated |
| 2011 | Nickelodeon Australian Kids' Choice Awards | Get Real Award | Nominated |
| 2011 | TV Tonight Awards | Best Reality (Australian) | Nominated |
| 2011 | Poprepublic.tv IT List Awards | Favourite Australian TV Show | Won |
| 2012 | Logie Awards | Most Popular Reality Program | Nominated |
| 2012 | Poprepublic.tv IT List Awards | Favourite Australian TV Show | Won |
| 2013 | Logie Awards | Most Popular Light Entertainment Program | Nominated |
| 2013 | Logie Awards | Most Outstanding Light Entertainment Program | Won |
| 2013 | Cosmopolitan Fun, Fearless, Female Awards | TV Personality (Dannii Minogue) | Nominated |
| 2013 | TV Tonight Awards | Best Reality Show (Australian) | Nominated |
| 2013 | Poprepublic.tv Awards | Favourite Australian TV Show | Won |
| 2013 | Poprepublic.tv Awards | Favourite Concert Tour of 2013 (The X Factor Live Tour) | Nominated |
| 2014 | AACTA Awards | Best Reality Television Series | Nominated |
| 2014 | Logie Awards | Most Popular Light Entertainment Program | Nominated |
| 2014 | Cosmopolitan Fun, Fearless, Female Awards | TV Personality (Dannii Minogue) | Nominated |
| 2014 | Screen Producers Australia Awards | Reality Television Production | Nominated |
| 2014 | TV Tonight Awards | Best Reality Show (Australian) | Nominated |
| 2014 | TV Tonight Awards | Worst Male (Redfoo) | Nominated |
| 2015 | AACTA Awards | Best Reality Television Series | Nominated |
| 2015 | Screen Producers Australia Awards | Reality Television Production | Won |
| 2015 | AACTA Awards | Best Reality TV | Nominated |

== Spin-offs ==
=== The Xtra Factor ===
The Xtra Factor is a companion show that was broadcast after the main live shows. In season one, The Xtra Factor was broadcast on Network Ten and hosted by Chloe Maxwell. After The X Factor was revived for a second season in 2010, Natalie Garonzi became the new host of The Xtra Factor on the Seven Network's digital channel 7Two. The show was not renewed when The X Factor returned for a third season in 2011. The voiceover for both series of The Xtra Factor was Nicholas McKay.

The show featured behind-the-scenes footage of The X Factor and the emotional responses of the contestants after the judges commented on their performances. A celebrity panel was usually featured, who gave their opinions on the contestants. The judges and contestants also answered phone calls from viewers, while Facebook statuses, tweets, and SMS messages appeared on screen. The Xtra Factor also showed extra auditions, bootcamp performances and the judges' houses performances.

During the finalists time on The X Factor, The Xtra Factor camera crew followed the finalists about during their day. The footage which was filmed throughout the week would be broadcast once the show went live, once a week. There would also be an exclusive interview of the act which had been eliminated during that week of the show, and an exclusive interview with the winner and their mentor.

=== The X Stream ===
The X Stream is an online live streaming show that was broadcast via The X Factor's official website during the season four live performance shows on Monday nights. The show began on 17 September 2012 and was hosted by season three finalist Johnny Ruffo. The X Stream featured behind-the-scenes footage of the green room where contestants stay before and after their performances, a view of them waiting backstage as well as the contestants' responses after the judges commented on their performances. They also answered questions from viewers via Twitter. The X Stream did not return in 2013.

=== The Fan Factor ===
The Fan Factor is an online show that was hosted by comedy duo Luke & Wyatt. It began on 13 August 2014 and featured an all-access pass to The X Factor. The hosts also answered questions and completed challenges that viewers sent in. New episodes were released via The X Factor's official website on Wednesday nights. The Fan Factor did not return in 2015.

== Music releases by The X Factor contestants ==
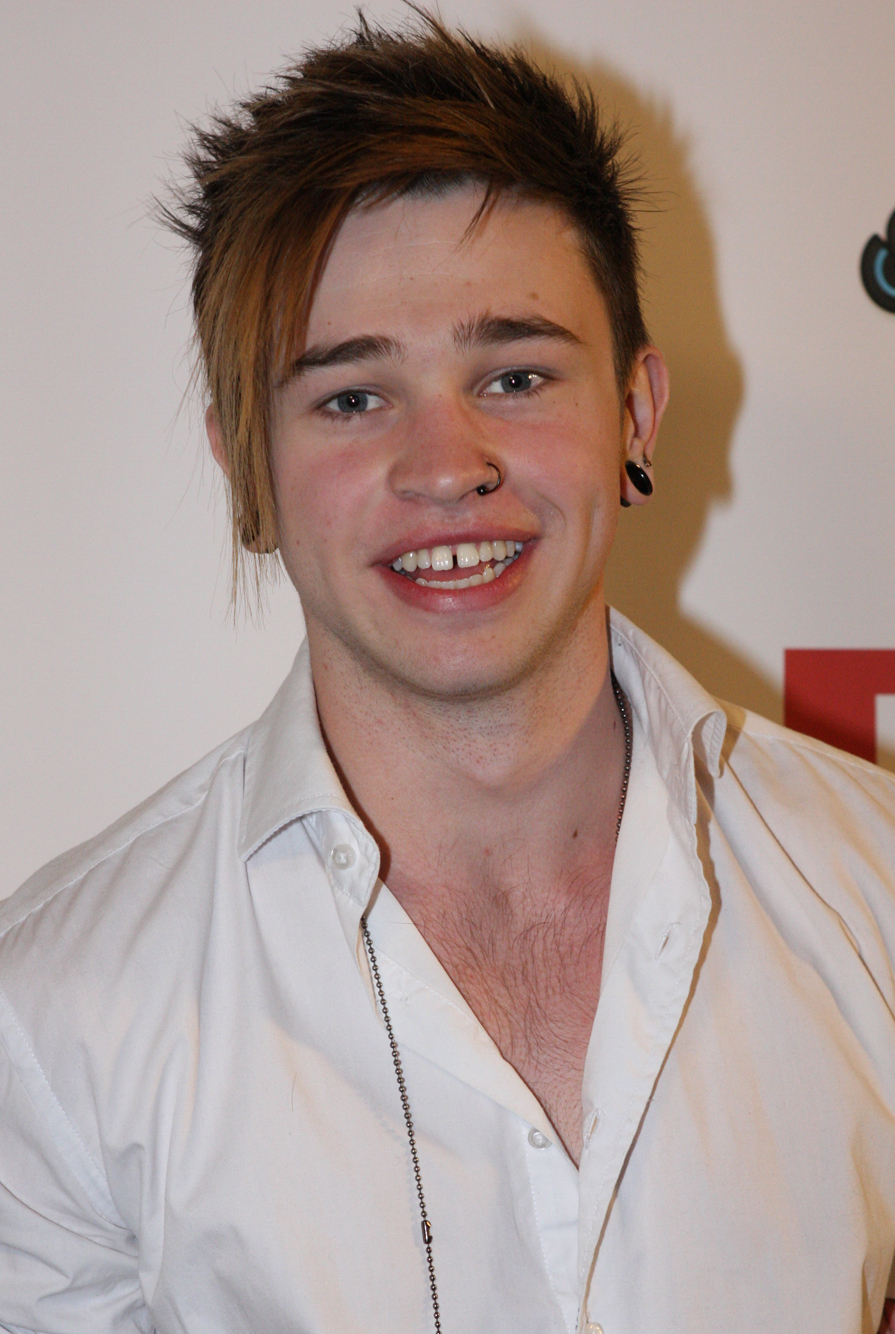
Season three winner Reece Mastin is the most successful contestant

After The X Factor winner was announced in the grand final, the winner received a recording contract with Sony Music Australia and their winner's single was made available to download on the iTunes Store. A few weeks later, their debut album was released, which contained their winner's single and cover versions of songs they performed during the live shows. From season three, the contestants' weekly performances were released onto the iTunes Store for a limited time only, which lead to a number of downloads and in some cases their performances appeared on the ARIA Singles Chart. Some top twelve finalists of the competition were also offered record deals, while others went on to release their music independently. Contestants that did not win but signed with Sony Music Australia include Johnny Ruffo, Young Men Society, The Collective, Jason Owen, Bella Ferraro, Nathaniel Willemse, Third Degree, Taylor Henderson, Jai Waetford, Dean Ray and Reigan Derry. Other contestants Christina Parie and Brothers3 signed with Warner Music Australia.

In November 2011, season three winner Reece Mastin became the first contestant to reach number one on the ARIA Singles Chart with the winner's single. Mastin is the most successful contestant, having released two top-five albums and three number-one singles (two in Australia and one in New Zealand). Season four winner Samantha Jade was the second contestant that topped the ARIA Singles Chart with the winner's single. Fifth season winner, Dami Im became the first X Factor Australia contestant to follow up a number one single with a number one album on the ARIA Charts. Im's debut single "Alive" was certified Platinum and topped the singles charts while her self titled debut album also certified Platinum and hit the top of the albums chart. Contestants have also achieved success on the New Zealand and South Korean charts.

=== Charity singles ===
The top twelve finalists of the fourth season recorded a cover of Carly Rae Jepsen's "Call Me Maybe" as a charity single, in aid of Sony Foundation's You Can program which aims "to build specialised and age-appropriate youth cancer centres across Australia". The single was released on the iTunes Store on 18 September 2012. It marked the first time finalists on the Australian version had released a charity single. The show's second charity single, a cover of Pharrell Williams' "Happy", was also released to help raise funds for the You Can program. It was recorded by the top six finalists of the sixth season with Australian pop group Justice Crew and released on the iTunes Store on 29 September 2014.

== International broadcast ==
| Country / Region | Channel |
|---|---|
| New Zealand | TV3 |

== See also ==
- List of Australian music television shows
- List of Australian television series
- The X Factor
