= Jacob Butler =

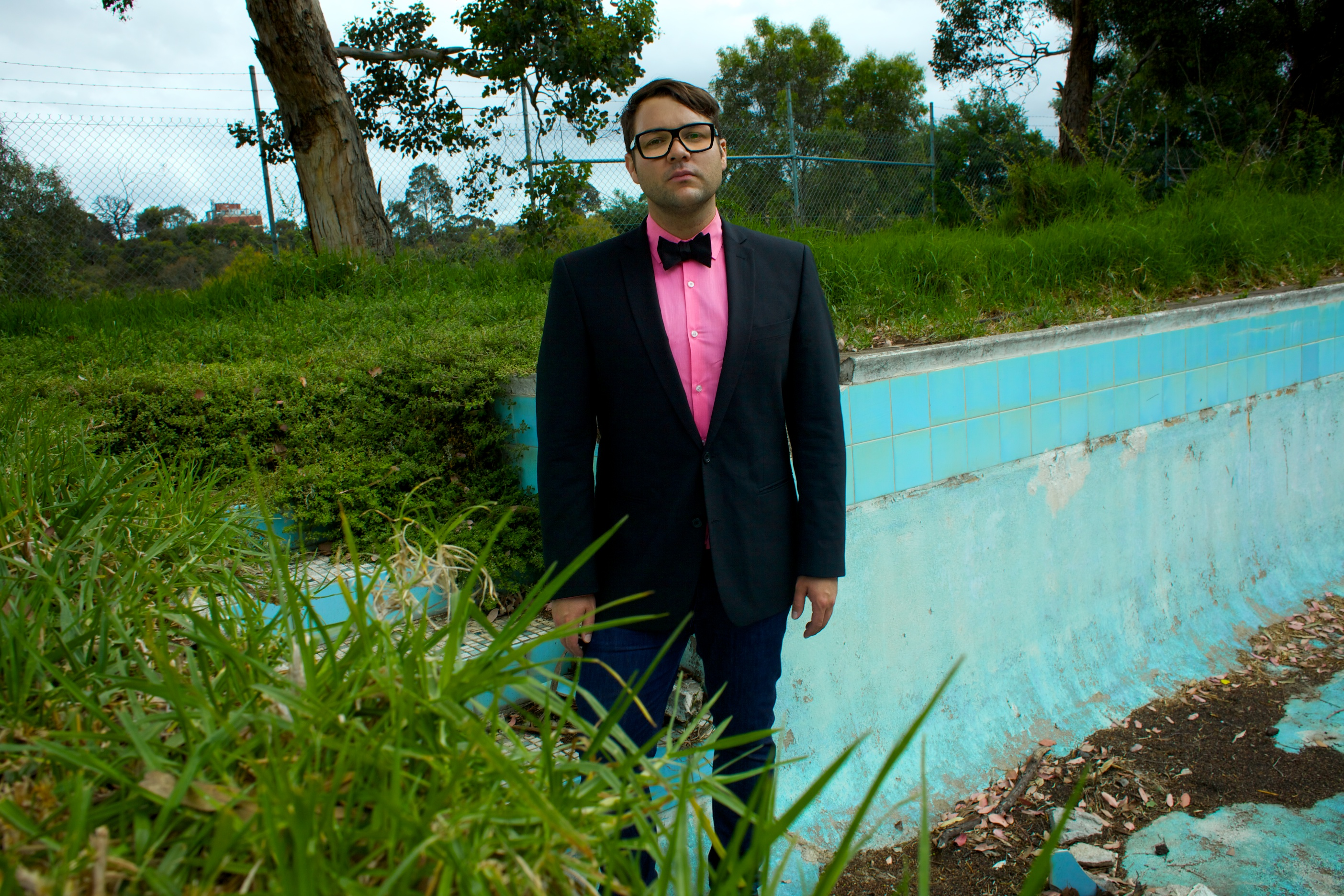
- Jacob Butler on location for the music video for "Come My Way".

Background information
- Born: Jacob Butler; 29 March 1982 (age 44); Mount Gambier, South Australia, Australia
- Genres: Pop rock; alternative rock; indie rock
- Occupations: Singer; songwriter; musician
- Instruments: Vocals; guitar; drums
- Years active: 2005–present
- Website: thejbproject.net

Jacob Butler (born 29 March 1982) is an Australian pop and rock musician and singer-songwriter. He became known for his participation on Australian Idol and The X Factor Australia. His debut album Reason was released in Europe in 2012, then in Australia and New Zealand on 16 August 2013.

== Career ==
Jacob Butler gained national prominence in Australia in 2005 when he participated in the first season of The X Factor (Australia). He was the fourth contestant eliminated.

In 2007, Butler took a new approach in the talent show Australian Idol. He made it through to the live shows and finished the competition ranked 8th

In 2009, Butler released his debut single "Coma" though his own independent label, Lions Share Recordings. The single peaked at # 9 in the Australian AIR Charts. He also made it to the finals of the Musicoz Awards and the Independent International Songwriters Contest. In the video for "Coma", Pippa Black and Sweeney Young from the television series Neighbours, played the lead roles. The video was directed by Matt Hart. The song was also used in the promotional trailer for the season finale of the series.

In August 2009, Butler Performed at the City2Surf (Sydney) Charity Race, along with fellow Idol contestants, Wes Carr, and Jessica Mauboy.

In September 2009, Butler filmed a Guest Appearance on Neighbours, Performing his song "Coma" on the show, at Charlies Bar. The Episode aired in Australia on 20 January 2010.

Butler then performed "Coma" in October, Live on the 2009 Channel Seven Perth Telethon. Butler's first television performance of "Coma" was on the show, Mornings with Kerri-Anne back in August 2009.

In November 2009, Butler put out a digital EP called 'Coma Remixes" that contained two remixes of "Coma" by Australian DJ LowKiss.

Butler was then part of a 'Radar (radio) Showcase Gig' at the Evelyn Hotel in Melbourne on 4 November 2009, alongside Australian pop/rock band My Future Lies.

In 2010, Butler put out the "Coma LP" as a Limited Edition Physical CD. The LP contained the four versions of "Coma" (single, demo, and the two remixes) plus six more previously unreleased tracks. Only 200 CD's were pressed, coming with either a red or green coloured disc.

In 2011, Butler recorded his album Reason. This was produced by Richard Stolz in the famous Sing Sing Studios and L.U.C.A Sound Studios in Melbourne.

In 2012, Butler made the leap abroad and secured several record contracts. Among other things, he is under contract with the labels Very Us Records (Germany, Austria and Switzerland), V2 Records (Benelux), Universal Music (Poland and Bulgaria), Bill Berg Entertainment (Scandinavia) EMI (Greece and Cyprus) and The David Gresham Company (South Africa).

With his single "Come My Way", Butler received a Top 5 Nomination in the Alternative Music Category of the 2012 MusicOz Awards. The song was played in Germany on all major radio stations, and made it to No. 47 of the mainstream airplay chart. He performed a live version of "Come My Way" on Children's Program Kids' WB Australia which aired on Mother's Day, 2012. "Come My Way" also ran in a television advertisement for Warner Bros. Movie World in Australia. and was preloaded onto Sony Xperia, Billabong edition smartphones.

Also in 2012 with his song "Mind Waltz", Butler won the prestigious "Unsigned Only Music Competition" in the adult album alternative category "AAA". Butler co-wrote the song, with Ben Stolz.

Finnish Music Producer Jukka Backlund made a 'Euro Radiomix' of Butler's single "Ukok", which was released in August 2012 with the single as a Bonus track.

In October 2012, Butler flew to Germany, Sweden and Poland for a monthlong promotional tour. While there he did live performances and interviews, for TV and Radio. Including an Album Launch at the Australian embassy in Stockholm.

Butler released the music video for his single "Kites" on 7 July 2013. The video for "Kites" was self-directed by Butler and was filmed on location in Switzerland at several locations including, Lake Lucerne, Stockhorn and Mount Pilatus.

In August 2013, Magic 89.9 FM hosted an 'Exclusive Listener Party' in Port Lincoln, for their radio listeners to meet Butler in person and hear his album in full before its official release date, with tickets to the event only available through a radio competition on their breakfast show.

Reason was released in Australia and New Zealand on 16 August 2013. Upon its release, the album debut at No. 15 on the Australian iTunes ‘Alternative Album’ Chart. The album was available as a digital album and as a physical CD, with the later sold in JB Hifi Stores as well as other smaller record stores. People were able to purchase a signed copy of the album when they pre-ordered it though the JB Hifi website. The album was released through a licensing deal with the Australian label, Red Rebel Music. Reason was finally launched in Australia after coming out in Europe almost a year before.

Butler's next single, "Get Right Round" was released in February 2014. Butler was originally going to pass the track onto another artist to use as a single, but his management convinced him to keep it and put the song out himself. The track is included as part of the Deluxe Edition of Reason and is not found on the original version. Reason Deluxe Edition came out on 10 October 2014 though iTunes.

== Discography ==
=== Albums ===
- Reason – 2012 (Europe)
- Reason – 2013 (Australia, New Zealand)
- Reason Deluxe Edition – 2014

=== Singles ===
- Coma – 2009
- Come My Way – 2012
- Ukok – 2012
- Mind Waltz – 2012
- Kites – 2013
- Get Right Round – 2014

=== Music Videos ===
- Coma – Directed by Matt Hart, 21 July 2009
- Come My Way – Directed by Jacob Butler, 10 January 2012
- Ukok – Directed by Jacob Butler, 27 July 2012
- Kites – Directed by Jacob Butler – 7 July 2013

== Personal life ==
Butler was born in Mount Gambier. He then moved with his parents to Port Lincoln and from there on to Adelaide. On 24 March 2013, Jacob Butler married his longtime fiancée and Network Ten Publicity Manager, Paula Lucarelli in Melbourne, where they live today.
