= John Reid (music manager) =

Scottish music manager

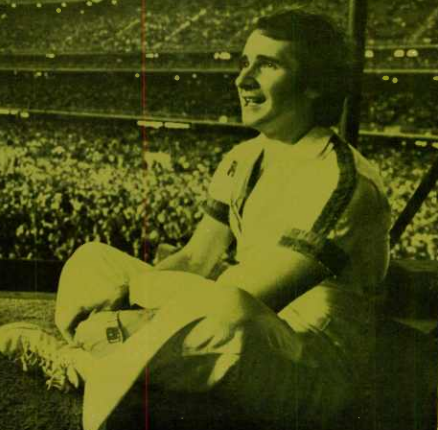
- Reid in 1975
- Born: 9 September 1949 (age 77); Paisley, Renfrewshire, Scotland
- Occupations: Music manager; panellist; music businessman
- Years active: 1967–1999; 2005–2006
- Known for: Manager of Elton John (1970–98); Manager of Queen (1975–78)
- Partner: Elton John (1970–75) James Thompson (1990-Present)

John Reid (born 9 September 1949) is a Scottish retired music manager. He was the manager and former partner of singer Elton John, and the manager of British rock band Queen.

== Early life ==
Reid was born in Paisley, Renfrewshire, Scotland, the son of John Reid, a welder, and Betty, a shop worker. Apart from three years in New Zealand, he was brought up in the Gallowhill district of Paisley. He attended St Mirin's Academy, where he was a fellow pupil with singers Gerry Rafferty and Joe Egan. After leaving school he attended Stow College in Glasgow where he studied marine engineering, but dropped out to move to London in 1969.

== Career ==
Reid began his music management career in 1967 at the age of 18 as a promoter for EMI. At the age of 19, he became the Tamla Motown label manager for the UK. In 1971, Reid set up his own company with a few hundred pounds in savings and a £5,000 loan.

In 1970, Reid met Elton John at a Motown Christmas party. They moved in with each other, and began a romantic relationship as well as a business one, as John became Reid's first client. Their personal relationship ended after five years, but he remained John's manager until 1998. Reid was John's best man at his 1984 wedding.

Reid and John's professional relationship ended over a leaked letter detailing John's spending, which was found by Benjamin Pell and published in the Daily Mirror. The ending of their business relationship in 1998 led to a legal action in 2000. Reid settled out of court by paying John £3.4 million. Reid's company earned more than £73 million from representing John between 1970 and 1998.

Also in the 1970s, Reid briefly managed comedian Billy Connolly.

Between 1975 and 1978, Reid was the manager of British rock group Queen. Reid's first instruction for the band was "I'll take care of the business; you make the best record you can". Reid parted ways with Queen in 1978 by handing the role to Jim Beach in what he calls "the gentlest parting of the ways of anyone I have ever worked with"; in the 2018 Freddie Mercury biopic Bohemian Rhapsody, it was portrayed that he was fired by Mercury after Reid tried to convince him to ditch the band and go solo.

In 1994, he was the manager for Irish dancer Michael Flatley. After Flatley left Riverdance and ended his relationship with Reid, Flatley paid Reid approximately £1 million to settle a wrongful termination lawsuit.

Reid retired from management in 1999. In 2005 and 2006, Reid was a judge on the Australian version of The X Factor alongside Mark Holden and Kate Ceberano, then he got replaced by Ronan Keating.

== Personal life ==
In 1974, in New Zealand, in a widely reported incident, Reid threw champagne in the face of a party host and punched the Auckland model and journalist Judith Baragwanath in the face when she came to the man's defence, sending her to the floor. Later the same night, he was involved in an altercation with a second journalist at a nightclub. He was convicted and sentenced to a month in prison for assault, and settled with Baragwanath for NZ $2500.

In 1998, Reid sold his art collection, estimated to have been worth £2 million.

== In media ==
Reid was portrayed by Aidan Gillen in the 2018 Queen biopic Bohemian Rhapsody, and by Richard Madden in the 2019 Elton John biopic Rocketman, both of whom worked on the HBO fantasy TV series, Game of Thrones. Reid made no comment on either film, but Mike Batt attacked the Rocketman portrayal, in which Reid is emotionally abusive towards Elton John, as a "weapons-grade character assassination".
