= Random (group) =

Australian musical group

- Origin: Brisbane, Queensland, Australia
- Genres: R&B
- Years active: 2005–2007, 2009
- Label: Sony/BMG
- Past members: Xylocaine "Xy" Latu; Donald Tauvao; Tasesa Junior "TJ" Tauvao; Wayne Tauvao; Andy-Iese "Jesse" Tolo-Paepae

Random were a five-member Australian R&B vocal group formed in 2005 by Xylocaine "Xy" Latu, Wayne Tauvao, Tasesa Junior "TJ" Tauvao, Donald Tauvao and Andy-Iese "Jesse" Tolo-Paepae. Random were the winners of the first season of The X Factor (Australia); they were also the first (of five worldwide) group to win the franchise. In October that year, they issued their debut self-titled album, which peaked in the ARIA Albums Chart top 100. Their first single, "Put Your Hands Up", peaked at No. 7 on the related ARIA Singles Chart. A follow-up single, "Are You Ready", reached No. 36. The group disbanded in 2007 but briefly reunited in October 2009 for a one-off performance.

== History ==
Random formed at the Brisbane auditions for The X Factor (Australia) in December 2004. Initially Xylocaine "Xy" Latu and Andy-Iese "Jesse" Tolo-Paepae were to compete as a duo, Rough Diamonds; while Tasesa Junior "TJ" Tauvao wanted to enter as a solo artist: he was attending with his brother Wayne Tauvao and their cousin, Donald Tauvao – all three were former members of a vocal trio, 315. Prior to auditioning all five agreed to compete as a combined R&B vocal quintet and named themselves, Random. The group were mentored by Mark Holden and won the TV talent contest.

== After X Factor ==
The group released their first single "Put Your Hands Up" on 10 June 2005 after their win. The single reached No. 7 on the Australian ARIA Chart. Their second single, "Are You Ready", peaked at No. 36 in September. They released their self-titled debut album on 9 October 2005, but it only reached No. 79.

The group performed at Australia's biggest Christian music festival, the Australian Gospel Music Festival Awards in 2006 before breaking up.

In October 2009 the group reunited for a one-off benefit concert for victims of the Samoan tsunami. Latu reflected on their split, "we all wanted to do different things and there were other personal issues that needed to be taken care of." All five ex-members were either performers or record producers.

== Members ==
- Xylocaine "XY" Latu, (born 13 January 1979 in Tonga) from Logan Central
- Andy-Iese "Jesse" Tolo-Paepae, (born 19 January 1984 in Australia) from Kingston
- Wayne Tauvao, (born 8 December 1985 in New Zealand) from Queensland
- Tasesa Junior "TJ" Tauvao, (born 31 May 1988 in New Zealand) from Kippa-Ring
- Donald Tauvao, (born 12 October 1988 in Western Samoa) from Redcliffe

== Discography ==
=== Studio albums ===
List of albums, with selected details and chart position
Title	Album details	Peak chart positions
Title	Album details	AUS
Random	Released: October 2005; Format: CD; Label: Sony BMG (82876709362)	79

=== Singles ===
List of singles, with selected chart positions
Title	Year	Peak chart positions	Album
Title	Year	AUS	Album
"Put Your Hands Up"	2005	7	Random
"Are You Ready"	2005	36	Random

The X Factor (Australia); Winner; 2005	Succeeded by Altiyan Childs
