= Taylor Henderson discography =

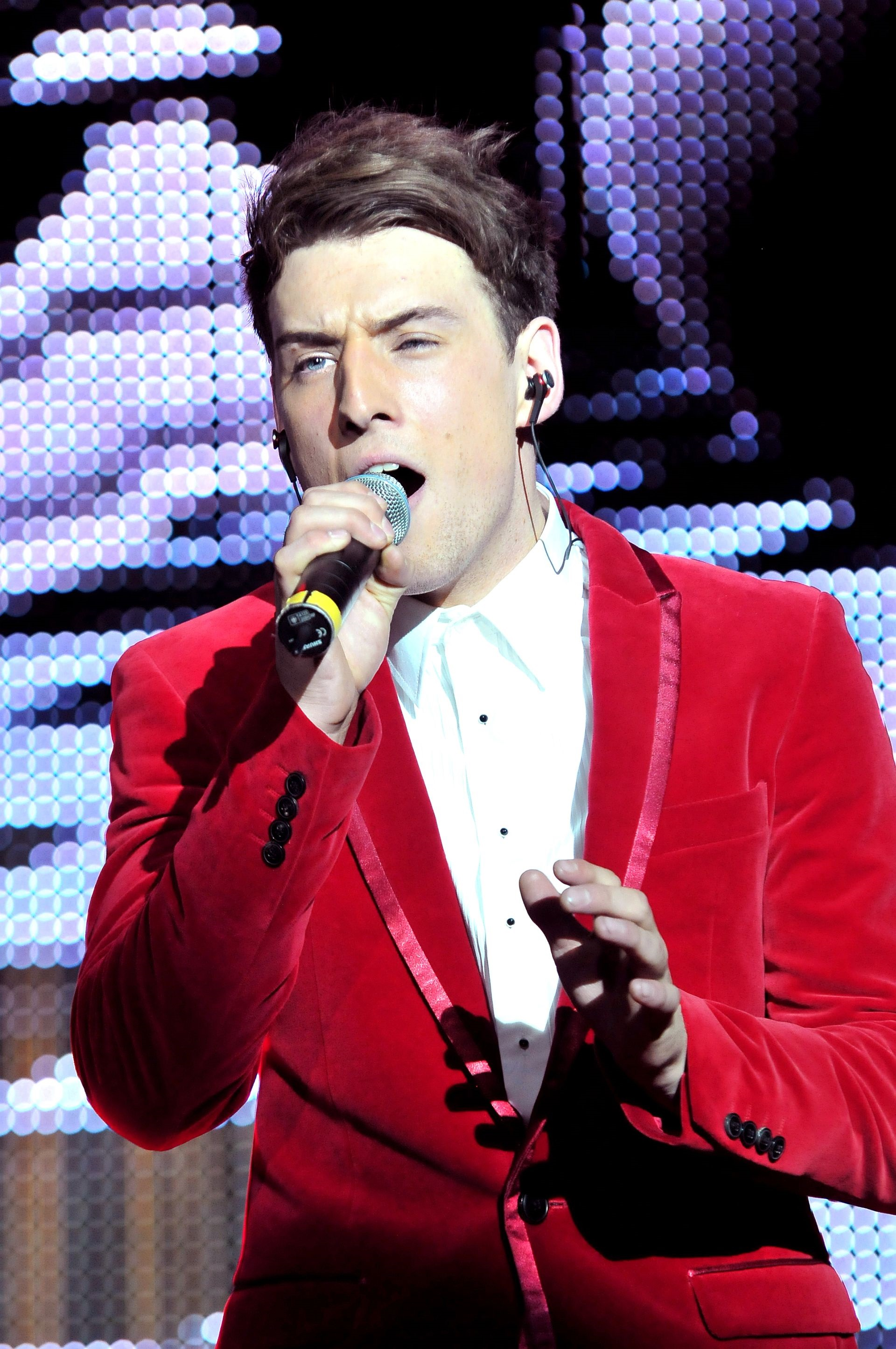
- Taylor Henderson performing during The X Factor Live Tour in November 2013
- Studio albums: 2
- EPs: 2
- Singles: 9
- Music videos: 5
- Album appearances: 1

The discography of Australian singer and songwriter Taylor Henderson consists of two studio albums, two extended plays, nine singles one album appearance, and five music videos. Henderson was the runner-up on the fifth season of The X Factor Australia in 2013, and subsequently received a contract with Sony Music Australia. He released his self-titled debut album in November 2013, which features selected songs he performed as part of the top twelve on The X Factor. The album debuted at number one on the ARIA Albums Chart and was certified platinum by the Australian Recording Industry Association (ARIA), denoting shipments of 70,000 copies. Additionally, the album also included Henderson's debut single "Borrow My Heart", which topped the ARIA Singles Chart and was certified double platinum.

In January 2014, Henderson collaborated with Dami Im, Jessica Mauboy, Justice Crew, Nathaniel Willemse and Samantha Jade on a cover of "I Am Australian" to coincide with the Australia Day celebrations. Their cover peaked at number 51 on the ARIA Singles Chart. Henderson released his second studio album Burnt Letters in July 2014, which became his second consecutive number-one album on the ARIA Albums Chart. It was certified gold, denoting shipments of 35,000 copies. The album was preceded by the lead single "When You Were Mine", which peaked at number five on ARIA Singles Chart and was certified platinum. Its second single "Already Gone" was released to moderate success, peaking at number 42 on the ARIA Singles Chart.

== Studio albums ==
List of studio albums, with selected chart positions and certifications
Title	Album details	Peak chart positions	Sales	Certifications
Title	Album details	AUS	Sales	Certifications
Taylor Henderson	Released: 29 November 2013; Label: Sony Music Australia; Formats: CD, digital download	1	AUS: 74,000 (as of 2013)	ARIA: Platinum
Burnt Letters	Released: 11 July 2014; Label: Sony Music Australia; Formats: CD, digital download	1		ARIA: Gold

== Extended plays ==
List of extended plays
Title	Details
The Acoustic Sessions	Released: 4 July 2014; Label: Sony Music Australia; Formats: Digital download
Fusions, Vol. 1 (with Reigan)	Released: 18 December 2015; Label: Sony Music Australia; Formats: Digital download

== Singles ==
List of singles, with selected chart positions and certifications
Title	Year	Peak chart positions	Certifications	Album
Title	Year	AUS	Certifications	Album
"Some Say They Will" (featuring Cam Henderson)	2010	—		Non-album single
"Borrow My Heart"	2013	1	ARIA: 2× Platinum	Taylor Henderson
"I Am Australian" (with Dami Im, Jessica Mauboy, Justice Crew, Nathaniel Willemse and Samantha Jade)	2014	51		Non-album single
"When You Were Mine"	2014	5	ARIA: Platinum	Burnt Letters
"Already Gone"	2014	42		Burnt Letters
"Host of Angels"	2014	55		Burnt Letters
"Brighter Days"	2014	—		Burnt Letters
"Light Up the Dark"	2016	82		Non-album singles
"Love Somebody"	2018	—		Non-album singles
"Moving On"	2019	—		Non-album singles
"—" denotes a single that did not chart.

== Other charted songs ==
List of non-single songs, with selected chart positions and certifications
Title	Year	Peak chart positions	Certifications
Title	Year	AUS	Certifications
"I Won't Let You Go"	2013	84	
"I Will Wait"	2013	64	
"Let Her Go"	2013	85	
"Choirgirl"	2013	51	
"The Horses"	2013	27	
"Wake Me Up"	2013	49	
"One Crowded Hour"	2013	38	
"Girls Just Want to Have Fun"	2013	2	ARIA: Gold
"Against All Odds"	2013	90	
"The Blower's Daughter"	2013	43	
"Some Nights"	2013	45	

== Album appearances ==
List of album appearances
Title	Year	Album
"The First Noel"	2014	The Spirit of Christmas 2014

== Music videos ==
List of music videos
Title	Year	Director(s)
"Borrow My Heart"	2013	James Chappell
"When You Were Mine"	2014	James Chappell
"Already Gone"	2014	Lawrence Lim
"Host of Angels"	2014	Matt Sharpe
"Brighter Days"	2014	
"Light Up the Dark"	2016	
