= Burnt Letters =

Studio album by Taylor Henderson
- Released: 11 July 2014
- Genres: Pop; folk; country
- Label: Sony
- Producers: Adrian Breakspear; Robby De Sa; Alex Hope; Jon Hume; Lindsay Rimes; Louis Schoorl; Trinity

Taylor Henderson chronology
| The Acoustic Sessions (2014) | Burnt Letters (2014) |

Singles from Burnt Letters
- 1. "When You Were Mine" Released: 7 March 2014; 2. "Already Gone" Released: 20 June 2014; 3. "Host of Angels" Released: 18 September 2014; 4. "Brighter Days" Released: 26 November 2014

Burnt Letters is the second studio album by Australian singer and songwriter Taylor Henderson, released on 11 July 2014 by Sony Music Australia. The album is Henderson's first to be made up of entirely original songs, as his previous self-titled debut album consisted of cover songs. Recorded over an eight-month period, Henderson worked on Burnt Letters with a variety of producers and writers such as Louis Schoorl, Alex Hope, Hayley Warner, Jon Hume, Robby De Sa and Lindsay Rimes. Described by the singer as "a very raw and open acoustic album", Burnt Letters incorporates styles of pop, folk and country music. Lyrically, the album's themes speak of "family, lost love and longing for home."

Upon its release, Burnt Letters received generally favourable reviews from critics and became Henderson's second consecutive album to debut at number one on the ARIA Albums Chart. It was certified gold by the Australian Recording Industry Association, denoting shipments of more than 35,000 units. The album was preceded by its first two singles, "When You Were Mine" and "Already Gone". The former became a top-five hit on the ARIA Singles Chart and was certified platinum, while the latter only reached the top-fifty. Henderson promoted Burnt Letters with television performances and instore appearances. He also embarked on his third headlining concert tour, entitled the Burnt Letters Tour.

== Background and development ==
"I wanted this album to feel fragile, to feel like it was pulled out of a burning building, so the title of the song 'Burnt Letters' seemed like a good description of what I'm offering up. I wanted the title of the album to capture the raw and brittle sentiment in the songs, and the song itself makes a mirrored-statement about the sound and style of the album."

— Henderson on naming the album after its title track.

Burnt Letters is the follow-up to Henderson's self-titled debut album, which featured re-recorded covers of the selected songs he performed as a finalist on The X Factor Australia. During an interview with Renowned for Sound in March 2014, Henderson confirmed that he had already begun work on Burnt Letters, stating: "I'm really proud of everything I've written for it so far. I think I've taken some risks with some of the songs, but everything has a lot of soul and depth." He later told Girl.com.au that the songs he wrote years ago were also being recorded for the album. Henderson worked on Burnt Letters for eight months with several record producers and songwriters, including Louis Schoorl, Jon Hume, Alex Hope and Lindsay Rimes, among others. After writing new songs for the album, Henderson presented them to Sony Music Australia and received good feedback from the label. He said "they were really impressed with the way I could carry a song and tell a story." Despite his music not being typical pop, Henderson revealed that Sony did not interfere with his "songwriting processes or tone" for Burnt Letters, admitting that the album is exactly the way he wanted it.

== Music and lyrics ==
Described by Henderson as "a very raw and open acoustic album", Burnt Letters consists of pop, folk and country music styles. TV Week viewed the album as "a raw and revealing collection" with "themes of family, lost love and longing for home". Tianna Nadalin of the Geelong Advertiser wrote that it features Henderson's "signature brand of melodic folk, buttery vocals and heartfelt lyrics." In an interview with The Newcastle Herald, Henderson described the type of songs on Burnt Letters, saying: "There are songs that are fragile and some are your typical heart-throb songs." He further added, "There are no throwaway songs in there to bulk it up. Every song I've written there has meaning behind it."

The album's opening track "When You Were Mine" is a pop and folk song that incorporates influences of country music. Over a "laid back and intimate" production from Louis Schoorl, Henderson sings "about a lost love and wishing to buy back the time." Melissa Redman of Renowned for Sound noted that "When You Were Mine" features an "acoustic vibe", while Take 40 Australia and Mike Wass of Idolator compared the song to Henderson's debut single "Borrow My Heart" (2013). The second track "Already Gone" was also produced by Schoorl, and is a pop-country song that lyrically speaks about Henderson missing his home and loved ones. According to Marcus Floyd of Renowned for Sound, the fourth song "Brighter Days" contains "the typical 'I'm with you / You're not alone' pop mush you expect to hear from an ex-talent show contestant." The fifth song in Burnt Letters is the upbeat "Worth Fighting For", which was written by Jon Hume and Henderson. The pair also co-wrote the sixth track "Host of Angels", which is dedicated to Henderson's youngest sister. It is a piano ballad that talks "about the innocence of a child and how it can be neglected sometimes." Lyrics include the lines "But oh, I know you'll make it through, There's a host of angels watching over, over you, over you." Henderson initially started writing "Host of Angels" at the age of 15 and got Hume to help him finish writing the song.

"Piece by Piece", the seventh track, was the third song on the album produced by Schoorl. The following track, "Close to Nothing" is a pop and folk song produced by Trinity. The guitar ballad "Matter of Time" is the ninth song on Burnt Letters. Tenth in the album is "The Best Part", which was co-written by Henderson, Schoorl, Emma Birdsall, Christian Lo Russo and Alex Hope. The song's verses feature a percussion and guitar as its instrumentation. Burnt Letters then moves on to the rhythmic pop song "Taking Back", which was co-written by Hume and Henderson. Floyd noted that the track features "a head strong melody with empowering lyrics". The final song is the album's title track "Burnt Letters", which was produced by Hope. It is a pop ballad that contains "emotive vocals" from Henderson and a "hypnotic guitar-line".

== Release and promotion ==
Beginning on 16 May to 6 June 2014, fans were given the chance to pre-order Burnt Letters online through Sanity or JB Hi-Fi for their names to be printed in the thank you notes of the album booklet. On 5 June 2014, Henderson announced the release date for Burnt Letters and revealed the album cover via his social media platforms. Following the announcement, the song "Sail Away" was made available to download alongside the iTunes pre-order of the album. From 30 June to 10 July 2014, visual teasers of songs "Taking Back", "Matter of Time", "Piece by Piece", "Close to Nothing", "Worth Fighting For", "The Best Part", "Host of Angels", "Brighter Days" and "Burnt Letters" were uploaded to Henderson's Vevo account. On 4 July 2014, Henderson's first extended play, The Acoustic Sessions, was released exclusively on the JB Hi-Fi online store, featuring acoustic versions of six songs from Burnt Letters. On 9 July 2014, Henderson performed acoustic versions of "When You Were Mine" and "Piece by Piece" in the Take 40 Australia Live Lounge. The album was released both digitally and physically on 11 July 2014.

On the day of Burnt Letters' release, Henderson performed "Already Gone" on Sunrise, "Piece by Piece" on The Morning Show and performed and signed physical copies of the album during an instore appearance at Westfield Burwood. He continued his instore appearances at Capalaba Central Shopping Centre (12 July 2014), Westfield Fountain Gate (13 July 2014), Westfield Tuggerah (17 July 2014) and Geelong Market Square Shopping Centre (23 July 2014). Henderson also promoted Burnt Letters with television interviews on The Daily Edition (15 July 2014) and Better Homes and Gardens (8 August 2014) and performances of "Already Gone" on The Riff (18 July 2014) and The Footy Show (24 July 2014). On 27 July 2014, he took over as the radio host for Nova FM from 1:00pm to 3:00pm. Henderson performed "Host of Angels" on The X Factor Australia (6 October 2014) and Sunrise (9 October 2014). He also performed "Brighter Days" on Sunrise on 20 November 2014.

=== Singles ===
"When You Were Mine" was released as the lead single from Burnt Letters on 7 March 2014. The song garnered positive reviews from critics, many of whom praised its composition and lyrics as well as Henderson's vocal performance. Upon its release, "When You Were Mine" debuted at number five on the ARIA Singles Chart and became Henderson's third top-five song. It was certified platinum by the Australian Recording Industry Association for sales exceeding 70,000 copies. The second single "Already Gone" was released on 20 June 2014, and peaked at number 42 on the ARIA Singles Chart. "Host of Angels" impacted Australian radio stations on 18 September 2014, as the album's third single. Upon its release, "Host of Angels" debuted at number 55 on the ARIA Singles Chart. The fourth single "Brighter Days" was serviced to Australian radio stations on 26 November 2014.

=== Burnt Letters Tour ===
To further promote the album, Henderson embarked on the Burnt Letters Tour, which began on 12 July 2014 in Brisbane and ended on 7 September 2014 in Bangalow. The Voice Australia finalists Gabriel and Cecilia were the supporting act for Henderson's final show at the Bangalow A&I Hall.

| Date | Location | Venue |
|---|---|---|
| 12 July 2014 | Brisbane | QPAC Playhouse |
| 7 August 2014 | Port Macquarie | Glasshouse Theatre |
| 8 August 2014 | Taree | Manning Theatre |
| 9 August 2014 | Wollongong | Waves |
| 10 August 2014 | Sydney | The Metro Theatre |
| 14 August 2014 | Melbourne | Ormond Hall |
| 15 August 2014 | Ballarat | Ballarat Regent Theatre |
| 16 August 2014 | Benalla | Benalla Performing Arts Centre |
| 17 August 2014 | Albury | Albury Entertainment Centre |
| 5 September 2014 | Bundaberg | Moncrieff Theatre |
| 6 September 2014 | Bokarina | Lake Kawana Community Centre |
| 7 September 2014 | Bangalow | A&I Hall |

== Reception ==
=== Critical response ===
Marcus Floyd from Renowned for Sound awarded Burnt Letters three-and-a-half stars out of five and gave it a mixed review, noting that most of the songs on the album "are borderline similar". He also added that "Burnt Letters wasn't an entirely bad release" but felt "it would have been better served as an EP" with the songs "When You Were Mine", "Already Gone", "Sail Away" and "Taking Back". However, not all of his review was negative. Floyd pointed out that "Henderson does manage to show off that voice of his to reassure us that he indeed has talent and almost had The X Factor." A positive review came from The Music's Bailey Lions who described Burnt Letters as "strangely addictive" and praised the "12 thoroughly enjoyable tracks of smooth rhythms and triumphant chorus hooks." A writer for Q News also praised the "great mix of tracks" and wrote that Henderson "has set himself at a standard higher than his predecessors and is fast proving his ability to deliver quality Australian music."

=== Commercial performance ===
For the issue dated 21 July 2014, Burnt Letters debuted at number one on the ARIA Albums Chart and became Henderson's second consecutive number-one album. It also became the seventh number-one album by an Australian act in 2014 and Sony Music Australia's first number-one album for 2014. In its second week, Burnt Letters dropped to number three and was certified gold by the Australian Recording Industry Association for shipments of more than 35,000 units. The album spent its first three weeks in the top ten. For the issue dated 13 October 2014, Burnt Letters jumped from number 14 to number eight on the ARIA Albums Chart, making it a fourth week within the top ten for the album.

== Track listing ==
| No. | Title | Writer(s) | Producer(s) | Length |
|---|---|---|---|---|
| 1. | "When You Were Mine" | Taylor Henderson; Louis Schoorl; Hayley Warner; Alex Hope | Schoorl | 3:27 |
| 2. | "Already Gone" | Henderson; Alex Hope; Schoorl | Schoorl | 3:10 |
| 3. | "Sail Away" | Shane Lee Evans; Henderson | Robby De Sa; Schoorl^{[a]} | 3:18 |
| 4. | "Brighter Days" | Alex Hope; Lindsay Rimes; Warner | Rimes; Schoorl^{[b]} | 3:17 |
| 5. | "Worth Fighting For" | Henderson; Shane Lee Evans | Hume; Schoorl | 3:43 |
| 6. | "Host of Angels" | Hume; Henderson | Hume; Schoorl | 4:21 |
| 7. | "Piece by Piece" | Henderson; Alex Hope; Schoorl; Shane Lee Evans | Schoorl | 2:59 |
| 8. | "Close to Nothing" | Shane Lee Evans; Warner | Trinity; Schoorl^{[b]} | 3:21 |
| 9. | "Matter of Time" | Henderson; Benjamin Francis Leftwich | Adrian Breakspear; Schoorl^{[a]} | 3:51 |
| 10. | "The Best Part" | Henderson; Emma Birdsall; Alex Hope; Christian Lo Russo; Schoorl | Schoorl | 3:21 |
| 11. | "Taking Back" | Henderson; Hume | Hume; Schoorl | 3:25 |
| 12. | "Burnt Letters" | Christopher Coleman; Alex Hope; Jarryd Klapper; Jenny Queen | Schoorl; Alex Hope | 3:54 |

Notes

- ^{^a} signifies an additional producer
- ^{^b} signifies a vocal producer

== Credits and personnel ==
Adapted from the liner notes of Burnt Letters.

Locations

- Recorded at 301 Studios, Sydney; Goldsbrough Studio, Sydney; The Kennel, Stockholm, Sweden; New Holland Studio, Sydney; Sony Studios, Sydney; The Stables Studio, Melbourne
- Mixed at The Kennel, Stockholm, Sweden; New Holland Studio, Sydney; The Stables Studio, Melbourne
- Mastered at Studios 301 in Sydney.

Vocal credits

- Emma Birdsall – background vocals
- Taylor Henderson – lead vocals, background vocals
- Alex Hope – background vocals
- Jon Hume – background vocals
- Jarryd Klapper – background vocals
- Louis Schoorl – background vocals
- Hayley Warner – background vocals

Creative credits

- Kane Hibberd – photography, design concept
- Eoin Stanley – booklet design

Technical credits

- Emma Birdsall – songwriter
- Adrian Breakspear – recording, vocal recording, engineering, assistant engineering
- Christopher Coleman – songwriter
- Robby De Sa – songwriter, producer, engineering, recording, drums, keys and programming, guitar
- Ben Fielding – songwriter, guitar
- Johan Gustafson (Trinity) – songwriter, producer, recording, instrumentation
- Fredrik Häggstam (Trinity) – songwriter, producer, mixing, recording, instrumentation
- Taylor Henderson – songwriter, guitar, acoustic guitar
- Alex Hope – songwriter, producer, mixing, engineering, bass, organ, percussion and programming
- Jon Hume – songwriter, producer, engineering, recording, mixing, percussion, bass and piano, acoustic guitar, electric guitar, programming
- Mitch Kenny – cello
- Jarryd Klapper – songwriter, guitar
- Benjamin Francis Leftwich – songwriter, guitar
- Christian Lo Russo – songwriter
- Sebastian Lundberg (Trinity) – songwriter, producer, recording, instrumentation
- Jesse Martin – cello
- Jenny Queen – songwriter
- Lindsay Rimes – songwriter, producer, engineering, mixing, instrumentation
- Louis Schoorl – songwriter, producer, additional producer, vocal producer, mixing, engineering, recording, bass, double bass, drums, piano, guitars, acoustic guitar, percussion and programming
- Leon Zervos – mastering
- Hayley Warner – songwriter
- Michael Wong – violin

== Charts ==
=== Weekly chart ===
| Chart (2014) | Peak position |
|---|---|
| Australian Albums (ARIA) | 1 |

=== Year-end charts ===
| Chart (2014) | Rank |
|---|---|
| Australian Albums Chart | 36 |
| Australian Artist Albums Chart | 12 |

== Certifications ==
| Region | Certification | Certified units/sales |
|---|---|---|
| Australia (ARIA) | Gold | 35,000^{^} |
^{^} Shipments figures based on certification alone.

== Release history ==
| Region | Date | Format | Label | Catalogue | Ref. |
|---|---|---|---|---|---|
| Australia | 11 July 2014 | CD; digital download | Sony Music Australia | 88843089132 | |

== See also ==
- List of number-one albums of 2014 (Australia)
