= Host of Angels =

Single by Taylor Henderson

from the album Burnt Letters
- Released: 18 September 2014
- Recorded: The Stables Studio, Melbourne; New Holland Studio, Sydney; Sony Studios, Sydney
- Genre: Pop
- Length: 4:21
- Label: Sony
- Songwriters: Taylor Henderson; Jon Hume
- Producers: Jon Hume; Louis Schoorl

Taylor Henderson singles chronology
"Already Gone" (2014)	"Host of Angels" (2014)	"Brighter Days" (2014)

"Host of Angels" is a song recorded by Australian singer and songwriter Taylor Henderson for his second studio album Burnt Letters. It was released to Australian radio stations on 18 September 2014 as the third single from the album. The song was written by Henderson and Jon Hume, who also produced the track alongside Louis Schoorl.

"Host of Angels" is a piano ballad that was written for Henderson's youngest sister to help her cope with the divorce of their parents. The song received positive reviews from critics, who complimented its arrangement and Henderson's vocals. Upon its release as a single, "Host of Angels" debuted at number 55 on the ARIA Singles Chart. Henderson promoted the track with interviews and performances on television and radio programs.

== Background and writing ==
"Host of Angels" was written by Taylor Henderson and Jon Hume, who also produced the track alongside Louis Schoorl. Henderson initially started writing "Host of Angels" when he was 15 years old. While working on his second studio album Burnt Letters (2014), Henderson got Hume to help him finish writing the song. Henderson admitted that "Host of Angels" is "one of the most personal songs" on Burnt Letters and added that "it was probably the most easiest song to write" because of how personal it is to him.

"Host of Angels" is a piano ballad that was written for Henderson's youngest sister to help her cope with their parents' divorce. Henderson found out about their divorce at the age of 13, while his sister was five years old at the time. He said, "My sister is now [at] that age [I found out] and she's dealing with that situation, and working through it from her understanding. I just wanted to hold her hand through this song, to let her know I'll always be there for her, regardless of what happens in her life." In "Host of Angels", Henderson reminds his sister that she will be okay, with lyrics such as "But oh, I know you'll make it through, There's a host of angels watching over, over you."

== Release and reception ==
On 17 September 2014, Henderson announced on his Twitter account that "Host of Angels" would be released as the follow-up to his previous single "Already Gone". The following day, "Host of Angels" was sent to Australian radio stations as the third single from Burnt Letters. Siobhan Graham of Underage.com.au described the song as a "heartfelt ballad", while Q News called it a "gentle ballad" and thought it was one of the great tracks on Burnt Letters. Nathan Pike of Project U wrote that the "beautiful ballad" showcases "the incredible vocals that we've come to love from" Henderson. Take 40 Australia described "Host of Angels" as a "beautiful" and "stunning ballad". Renowned for Sound's Marcus Floyd wrote that "it was nice to hear the piano take the lead" in the song. For the issue dated 13 October 2014, "Host of Angels" debuted at number 55 on the ARIA Singles Chart.

== Promotion ==
Henderson promoted "Host of Angels" with a radio interview on Smallzy's Surgery on 1 October 2014. He then performed the song during the ninth live decider show of the sixth season of The X Factor Australia on 6 October 2014. Henderson also performed "Host of Angels" on KIIS 106.5 (7 October 2014), Sunrise (9 October 2014), at the Channel Seven Perth Telethon (26 October 2014) and on The Morning Show (18 December 2014). The accompanying music video for "Host of Angels" was directed by Matt Sharpe and premiered on Henderson's Vevo account on 13 October 2014.

== Credits and personnel ==
Credits adapted from the liner notes of Burnt Letters.

Locations

- Recorded at The Stables Studio in Melbourne, New Holland Studio in Sydney, and Sony Studios in Sydney.
- Mastered at Studios 301 in Sydney.

Personnel

- Songwriting – Taylor Henderson, Shane Lee Evans
- Production – Jon Hume, Louis Schoorl
- Engineering – Jon Hume, Louis Schoorl
- Recording – Jon Hume, Louis Schoorl, Adrian Breakspear
- Mixing – Jon Hume
- Electric guitar, piano, percussion and bass – Jon Hume
- Bass, drums, acoustic guitar and piano – Louis Schoorl
- Background vocals – Taylor Henderson
- Violin – Michael Wong
- Cello – Jesse Martin
- Mastering – Leon Zervos

== Charts ==
Chart (2014)	Peak position
Australia (ARIA)	55

== Release history ==
Country	Date	Format	Label
Australia	18 September 2014	Radio	Sony Music Australia
