= Taylor Henderson (disambiguation) =

Taylor Henderson (born 1993) is an Australian singer.

Taylor Henderson may also refer to:

- Taylor Henderson (album), a 2013 album by the singer
- Taylor Henderson, violinist for Australian band Operator Please
