= When You Were Mine (Taylor Henderson song) =

Single by Taylor Henderson

from the album Burnt Letters
- Released: 7 March 2014
- Recorded: New Holland Studio, Sydney
- Genre: Pop; folk
- Length: 3:27
- Label: Sony
- Songwriter(s): Taylor Henderson; Louis Schoorl; Hayley Warner; Alex Hope
- Producer(s): Louis Schoorl

Taylor Henderson singles chronology
"I Am Australian" (2014)	"When You Were Mine" (2014)	"Already Gone" (2014)

"When You Were Mine" is a song recorded by Australian singer and songwriter Taylor Henderson. The song was written by Henderson, Louis Schoorl, Hayley Warner and Alex Hope, and produced by Schoorl. It was released on 7 March 2014 as the lead single from Henderson's second studio album, Burnt Letters. Musically, "When You Were Mine" is a pop and folk song that incorporates influences of country music, with lyrics "about a lost love and wishing to buy back the time."

The song received positive reviews from critics, who praised its composition and lyrics as well as Henderson's vocals. They also compared it to his debut single "Borrow My Heart" (2013). "When You Were Mine" reached number five on the ARIA Singles Chart and became Henderson's third top-five song. It was certified Platinum by the Australian Recording Industry Association for selling over 70,000 copies. The accompanying music video was directed by James Chappell and filmed at a vintage record store. To promote the single, Henderson performed "When You Were Mine" on Sunrise and at shopping centres across Australia.

== Writing and production ==
"When You Were Mine" was written by Taylor Henderson, Louis Schoorl, Hayley Warner and Alex Hope, and produced by Schoorl. The engineering and mixing was also handled by Schoorl. Schoorl also provided the bass, drums, piano, guitars and programming. Henderson also played the guitar, while Mitch Kenny played the cello. The background vocals on the song were performed by Henderson, Hope, Schoorl and Warner. In an interview with Renowned for Sound, Henderson revealed that he did not want "When You Were Mine" to sound like the second version of his debut single "Borrow My Heart". He also stated that he spent a lot of time working on the song's lyrics, saying: "I made sure that there wasn't one wasted word, there's nothing put in there just to fill time. The lyrics are all connected and I feel that's what makes the song very strong."

Musically, "When You Were Mine" is a pop and folk song that features influences of country music and begins with a guitar intro. Lyrically, the song "talks about a lost love and wishing to buy back the time." Melissa Redman from Renowned for Sound noted that the song has "some subtle tempo changes" and described its sound as "laid back and intimate." Both Idolator and Take 40 Australia compared "When You Were Mine" to "Borrow My Heart". Henderson described the song as a cross between Ed Sheeran, Matt Corby and Passenger.

== Release and reception ==
On 13 February 2014, a video was posted on YouTube of Henderson announcing that "When You Were Mine" would be available for pre-order on iTunes on Valentine's Day, with the song scheduled for release on 21 March 2014. However, its digital release was moved up two weeks earlier on 7 March 2014. A CD single featuring an acoustic version of "Borrow My Heart" was released on 21 March 2014. An acoustic version of "When You Were Mine" is included on Henderson's extended play, The Acoustic Sessions.

Upon its release, "When You Were Mine" debuted and peaked at number five on the ARIA Singles Chart issue dated 17 March 2014. It became Henderson's third top five song, following "Borrow My Heart" and his cover version of "Girls Just Want to Have Fun". "When You Were Mine" was certified Platinum by the Australian Recording Industry Association for selling over 70,000 copies.

=== Critical reception ===
"When You Were Mine" received positive reviews from critics. Melissa Redman from Renowned for Sound gave the song four-and-a-half stars out of five and predicted it to be another hit for Henderson due to "its heartfelt lyrics and acoustic vibe." She also described his vocals as "effortless" and commended him for not making "the mistake of oversinging" on the track. Redman further added that "When You Were Mine" is the perfect example of "everything that is Taylor Henderson, and we can't wait to see what he does next." Marcus Floyd from the same publication noted that the song has "a boyish sweet-heartedly sung verse and an addictive chorus."

Mike Wass from Idolator described "When You Were Mine" as "a country-tinged acoustic pop song in the mould of 'Borrow My Heart'" and thought that the song is "a good sound" for Henderson. Wass also noted that the line, "I've got a hand-me-down heart filled with second-hand love", could potentially be "the best opening line of any song released in 2014." Take 40 Australia wrote that "When You Were Mine" has "a very catchy hook" and noted that the song features "Henderson's fast becoming signature sound of folk infused and guitar heavy pop music" which resembles "Borrow My Heart".

== Promotion ==
Henderson's first televised performance of "When You Were Mine" was on Sunrise on 18 March 2014. Later in March, Henderson performed "When You Were Mine" during instore appearances at Westfield Warrawong (22 March 2014), Westfield Parramatta (23 March 2014), Market Square Shopping Centre, Geelong (26 March 2014) and Westfield Southland (29 March 2014). The following month, he continued his instore appearances at Westfield Helensvale (3 April 2014), Westfield Whitford City (6 April 2014) and Westfield West Lakes (8 April 2014). On 9 July 2014, Henderson performed an acoustic version of "When You Were Mine" in the Take 40 Australia Live Lounge.

=== Music video ===
The music video was directed by James Chappell. A behind-the-scenes video of the shoot was uploaded to Henderson's Vevo account on 26 February 2014, and the official video clip was released on 6 March 2014. Idolator's Mike Wass simply called it a "cute video."

The video begins with Henderson surrounded by vintage furniture in the back room of the record store he works at; he is seen sitting and playing an acoustic guitar while singing the song's lyrics directly at the camera. The next scene shows Henderson writing a letter and he puts it in a red post box outside the store. When Henderson is shown closing the store, a girl customer (played by Kendra Appleton) runs up to him and he invites her inside. After Henderson shows the girl around the store, they head upstairs onto the rooftop where they spend the night chatting and looking at a view of the city. These scenes are intercut with scenes of Henderson singing and playing the guitar on the rooftop. Towards the end of the video, the girl is seen outside her house and she finds Henderson's letter in her mailbox.

== Track listing ==
- Digital download
1. "When You Were Mine" – 3:27
- CD single
1. "When You Were Mine" – 3:27
2. "Borrow My Heart (Acoustic)" – 4:19

== Credits and personnel ==
Credits adapted from the liner notes of Burnt Letters.

Locations

- Recorded at New Holland Studio in Sydney.
- Mastered at Studios 301 in Sydney.

Personnel

- Songwriting – Taylor Henderson, Louis Schoorl, Hayley Warner, Alex Hope
- Production – Louis Schoorl
- Engineering – Louis Schoorl
- Mixing – Louis Schoorl
- Recording – Louis Schoorl
- Cello – Mitch Kenny
- Guitars – Taylor Henderson
- Bass, drums, piano, guitars and programming – Louis Schoorl
- Background vocals – Taylor Henderson, Alex Hope, Louis Schoorl, Hayley Warner
- Mastering – Leon Zervos

== Charts ==
=== Weekly chart ===
Chart (2014)	Peak position
Australia (ARIA)	5

=== Year-end chart ===
Chart (2014)	Rank
Australian Artist Singles Chart	19

== Certifications ==
Region	Certification	Certified units/sales
Australia (ARIA)	Platinum	70,000^{^}
^{^} Shipments figures based on certification alone.

== Release history ==
Country	Date	Format	Label	Catalogue
Australia	7 March 2014	Digital download	Sony Music Australia	
Australia	21 March 2014	CD	Sony Music Australia	88843050532
