= Light Up the Dark =

Light Up the Dark may refer to:

- Light Up the Dark (album), a 2015 album by Gabrielle Aplin, or the title track
- "Light Up the Dark" (Taylor Henderson song), 2016
