= Alex Hope (songwriter) =

Australian songwriter & producer (born 1993)

- Born: Alexandra Hope Robotham; 29 November 1993 (age 32); London, United Kingdom
- Genre: Pop
- Occupations: Record producer; songwriter; singer
- Instruments: Guitar; bass; vocals; piano
- Years active: 2012–present
- Label: Sony/ATV Music Publishing
- Website: http://www.alexhope.com.au

Alexandra Hope Robotham (born 29 November 1993) is an Australian producer, songwriter, and multi-instrumentalist. They are the child of author Michael Robotham.

== Career ==
Hope worked as a producer and writer on Troye Sivan's debut album, Blue Neighbourhood, released in December 2015, and featured as a vocalist on the song 'BLUE'. 'Youth' won Song of the Year at the 2016 ARIA Awards, where Hope was also nominated for Producer of the Year and Engineer of the Year for their work on Blue Neighbourhood.

In 2016, Hope was named Breakthrough Songwriter of the Year at the APRA Awards. In 2017, they became an APRA ambassador and were included in the Spotify 'Secret Genius' campaign as the ambassador for Australia.

Hope is known for their work with a variety of artists including Alanis Morissette, Selena Gomez, Troye Sivan, Tina Arena, Taylor Henderson, Wrabel, Tove Lo, Jack Antonoff and Broods.

Alex Hope was highlighted for their achievement during the 2018 Billboard Music Awards, alongside Ciara, Audra Mae and Taylor Parks, in partnership with Uber.

== Personal life ==
On 1 July 2021, Hope came out as non-binary via an Instagram post and announced their decision to change their gender pronouns to they/them, stating “Over the last year and a half I’ve had time to reflect, research and explore these feelings rather than push them away. What followed was a lot of lightbulb moments as I found vocabulary for how I had been feeling and a community of people who understood. I started to see myself. I could suddenly see myself in the future. I understood.”

== Full discography ==
Year	Title	Artist(s)	Album	Credits
2013	"Patchwork Heart"	Tina Arena	Reset	Writer
2013	"Don't Look Back"	Tina Arena	Reset	Writer
2013	"Only Lonely"	Tina Arena	Reset	Writer
2013	"Lose Myself"	Tina Arena	Reset	Writer
2013	"Your Eyes"	Jai Waetford	Jai Waetford	Writer
2013	"Borrow My Heart"	Taylor Henderson	Taylor Henderson	Writer
2014	"When You Were Mine"	Taylor Henderson	Burnt Letters	Writer
2014	"Already Gone"	Taylor Henderson	Burnt Letters	Writer
2014	"Brighter Days"	Taylor Henderson	Burnt Letters	Writer
2014	"Piece by Piece"	Taylor Henderson	Burnt Letters	Writer
2014	"The Best Part"	Taylor Henderson	Burnt Letters	Writer
2014	"Burnt Letters"	Taylor Henderson	Burnt Letters	Producer, Writer
2014	"Fun"	Troye Sivan	TRXYE	Writer
2014	"Palace"	Jessica Mauboy	Beautiful	Writer
2014	"The Pause"	Guy Sebastian	Madness	Writer
2015	"Fools"	Troye Sivan	Blue Neighbourhood	Writer
2015	"Dkla" (featuring Tkay Maidza)	Troye Sivan	Blue Neighbourhood	Writer
2015	"Heaven" (featuring Betty Who)	Troye Sivan	Blue Neighbourhood	Writer
2015	"Youth"	Troye Sivan	Blue Neighbourhood	Writer
2015	"Blue" (featuring Alex Hope)	Troye Sivan	Blue Neighbourhood	Featured Artist, Producer, Writer
2015	"Wild"	Troye Sivan	Blue Neighbourhood	Producer, Writer
2015	"Cool"	Troye Sivan	Blue Neighbourhood	Producer, Writer
2015	"Too Good"	Troye Sivan	Blue Neighbourhood	Producer, Writer
2015	"Nirvana"	Tuka	Life Death Time Eternal	Producer, Writer
2015	"Right by You"	Tuka	Life Death Time Eternal	Producer, Writer
2015	"My Star"	Tuka	Life Death Time Eternal	Producer, Writer
2016	"Wild" (featuring Alessia Cara)	Troye Sivan	Blue Neighbourhood	Producer, Writer
2016	"11 Blocks"	Wrabel	We Could Be Beautiful	Producer, Writer
2016	"Something"	Gnash	Non-album single	Producer, Writer
2016	"Hold the Line"	Broods	Conscious	Producer, Writer
2016	"Freak of Nature" (featuring Tove Lo)	Broods	Conscious	Producer
2016	"Recovery"	Broods	Conscious	Co-producer, Writer
2016	"One Thing"	Nicole Miller	Communication	Producer, Writer
2017	"Alien"	Tomi	Used To	Producer, Writer
2017	"hey, you got drugs?"	Tove Lo	Blue Lips	Producer, Writer
2017	"Tell Me Again"	Jamie Lawson	Happy Accidents	Writer
2018	"Chasing Daylight"	Mikky Ekko	Fame	Writer
2018	"Let You Down"	Mikky Ekko	Fame	Writer
2018	"What's It Like Now"	Mikky Ekko	Fame	Writer
2018	"If I Killed Someone For You"	Alec Benjamin	Narrated For You	Producer, Writer
2018	"If We Have Each Other"	Alec Benjamin	Narrated For You	Producer, Writer
2018	"Lucky Strike"	Troye Sivan	Bloom	Producer, Writer
2018	"Out For Love"	Bayli	Non-album single	Producer, Writer
2018	"M.Y.O.B."	Bayli	Non-album single	Producer, Writer
2018	"Back Up Plan"	Plested	First & Foremost	Producer, Writer
2018	"Hallucinate"	Missy Higgins	Solastalgia	Producer, Writer
2018	"Red Moon"	Missy Higgins	Solastalgia	Producer, Writer
2018	"I Believe You"	Fletcher	I Believe You	Producer, Writer
2018	"Say"	Ruel	Ready	Writer, Additional Production
2018	"Drink About" (featuring Dagny)	Seeb	Nice To Meet You	Writer
2018	"Strawberries & Cigarettes"	Troye Sivan	Love, Simon: OST	Writer
2018	"Howl"	Years & Years	Palo Santo	Writer
2018	"Put It On Me"	Matt Maeson	The Hearse	Writer, Additional Production
2019	"Reasons I Drink"	Alanis Morissette	Non-album single	Producer
2019	"Mind Is A Prison"	Alec Benjamin	These Two Windows	Producer, Writer
2019	"Hold My Breath Until I Die"	Tegan and Sara	Hey, I'm Just Like You	Producer, Writer
2019	"Don't Believe the Things They Tell You (They Lie)"	Tegan and Sara	Hey, I'm Just Like You	Producer, Writer
2019	"Hello, I'm Right Here"	Tegan and Sara	Hey, I'm Just Like You	Producer, Writer
2019	"I Know I'm Not the Only One"	Tegan and Sara	Hey, I'm Just Like You	Producer, Writer
2019	"Keep Them Close 'Cause They Will Fuck You Too"	Tegan and Sara	Hey, I'm Just Like You	Producer, Writer
2019	"Please Help Me"	Tegan and Sara	Hey, I'm Just Like You	Producer
2019	"I Don't Owe You Anything"	Tegan and Sara	Hey, I'm Just Like You	Producer
2019	"We Don't Have Fun When We're Together Anymore"	Tegan and Sara	Hey, I'm Just Like You	Producer
2019	"You Go Away and I Don't Mind"	Tegan and Sara	Hey, I'm Just Like You	Producer
2019	"All I Have to Give the World Is Me"	Tegan and Sara	Hey, I'm Just Like You	Producer
2019	"Hey, I'm Just Like You"	Tegan and Sara	Hey, I'm Just Like You	Producer
2019	"I'll Be Back Someday"	Tegan and Sara	Hey, I'm Just Like You	Producer
2019	"Real Thing"	Ruel	Free Time	Writer
2019	"Thing for You"	David Guetta, Martin Solveig	Non-album single	Writer
2019	"RAIN"	Ben Platt	Sing to Me Instead	Producer, Writer
2019	"Grow As We Go"	Ben Platt	Sing to Me Instead	Producer, Writer
2019	"Pretty"	Ingrid Michaelson	Stranger Songs	Producer, Writer
2019	"Must Have Been The Wind"	Alec Benjamin	These Two Windows	Producer, Writer
2019	"Call Me"	Rozes	Crazy	Producer, Writer
2019	"Right Words Wrong Time"	Carly Rae Jepsen	Dedicated	Producer, Writer
2019	"No More Suckers"	Marina and the Diamonds	Love + Fear	Producer, Writer
2020	"It's Raining Men"	DeathbyRomy	Promising Young Woman	Producer
2020	"Lonely"	Guilherme de Sá, Mauro Henrique, Daniel Lopes, Sandamí, Renato Vianna, André Leite and Luana Camarah	Homemade	Co-Writer
2020	"Make You Mine This Season"	Tegan and Sara	Happiest Season	Producer, Writer
2020	"Walk You Home"	Bishop Briggs	Non-album single	Producer, Writer
2020	"Revolution"	Lily Donat	I Am Woman	Producer, Writer
2020	"Life On Earth?"	Adam Melchor	Two Songs For Now	Writer
2020	"Ablaze"	Alanis Morissette	Such Pretty Forks in the Road	Producer
2020	"Reasons I Drink"	Alanis Morissette	Such Pretty Forks in the Road	Producer
2020	"Losing The Plot"	Alanis Morissette	Such Pretty Forks in the Road	Producer
2020	"Diagnosis"	Alanis Morissette	Such Pretty Forks in the Road	Producer
2020	"Smiling"	Alanis Morissette	Such Pretty Forks in the Road	Producer
2020	"Smiling"	Alanis Morissette	Such Pretty Forks in the Road	Producer
2020	"Match In The Rain"	Alec Benjamin	These Two Windows	Producer, Writer
2020	"I'm Not A Cynic"	Alec Benjamin	These Two Windows	Producer, Writer
2020	"The Book of You & I"	Alec Benjamin	These Two Windows	Producer, Writer
2020	"Magic Trick"	The Night Game	Non-album single	Writer
2020	"People You Know"	Selena Gomez	Rare	Co-Producer, Writer
2021	"Villain in Me"	Tenille Townes	Non-album single	Producer, Co-Writer
2021	"Carefully"	Ben Platt	Reverie	Producer, Co-Writer
2021	"I Wanna Love You But I Don't"	Ben Platt	Reverie	Producer, Co-Writer
2021	"Power"	Joy Crookes	Skin	Co-Writer
2021	"Love Runs Out" (featuring G-Eazy & Sasha Alex Sloan)	Martin Garrix	Non-album single	Co-Producer, Co-Writer
2021	"Anti-Romantic"	Tomorrow x Together	The Chaos Chapter: Freeze	Co-Producer, Writer
2021	"Haunted"	Madeline The Person	Non-album single	Co-Producer
2021	"Going Home"	Madeline The Person	Chapter 1: The Longing	Producer
2021	"Rest"	Alanis Morissette	Non-album single	Producer
2022	"When You Need It" (featuring Wrabel)	Tenille Townes	Masquerades	Producer
2022	"Grow as We Go" (featuring Sara Bareilles)	Ben Platt	Non-album single	Producer, Co-Writer
2022	"Beach House"	Carly Rae Jepsen	The Loneliest Time	Co-Producer, Co-Writer
2022	"Scares Me"	Dean Lewis	The Hardest Love	Producer, Co-Writer
2022	"Drunk in the Bathtub"	Jessie Murph	Non-album single	Producer, Co-Writer
2023	"Fictional"	Khloe Rose	Non-album single	Producer, Co-Writer
2023	"The Other POV"	Khloe Rose	The In Between	Producer, Co-Writer
2023	"Positive Spin"	Gretta Ray	Positive Spin +	Producer, Co-Writer
2023	"Diss and Disappoint"	Flowerkid	Diss and Disappoint	Producer, Co-Writer
2023	"Hold Back"	Luca Fogale	Run Where the Light Calls	Co-Writer
2023	"Made Up My Mind"	Jonah Kagen, Lily Meola	The Roads	Co-Writer
2023	"die!"	Savana Santos, Alex Hope	1	Producer, Co-Writer
2023	"Kidz Zone"	ZEROBASEONE	Melting Point	Co-Writer
2023	"You Don't Belong to Me"	Thomas Day	Love Me For Another Day	Co-Writer
2023	"My Mistake"	Kelly Clarkson	Chemistry	Co-Writer
2023	"In Pieces"	Chloe Bailey	In Pieces	Co-Producer, Co-Writer
2023	"Crush"	Bella Poarch & Lauv	Non-album single	Producer, Co-Writer
2024	"Andrew"	Ben Platt	Honeymind	Co-Producer, Co-Writer
2024	"Last Girl on Earth"	Tristan	If The Shoe Fits, Wear It	Producer, Co-Writer
2024	"Everywhere I Go"	Wild Rivers	Never Better	Co-Writer
2024	"4 Better 4 Worse"	Bellah Mae	Never Waste A Heartbreak	Producer, Co-Writer
2024	"Love Again"	Ben Goldsmith	The Start of Something Beautiful	Producer, Co-Writer
2024	"When I Said Goodbye"	Ben Goldsmith	The Start of Something Beautiful	Producer, Co-Writer
2024	"Look On"	Ben Goldsmith	The Start of Something Beautiful	Producer, Co-Writer
2024	"All American Queen"	Ben Platt	Honeymind	Producer, Co-Writer
2024	"Fear of Missing Out"	Ben Platt	Honeymind	Producer, Co-Writer
2024	"Need You Like This"	Ben Platt	Honeymind	Producer, Co-Writer
2024	"Home Of The Terrified"	Ben Platt	Honeymind	Producer, Co-Writer
2025	"Eyes Closed"	Jisoo, Zayn	Non-album single	Co-Producer, Co-Writer
2025	"Lose You"	Zach John King	Slow Down	Co-Writer
