= Already Gone (Taylor Henderson song) =

Single by Taylor Henderson

from the album Burnt Letters
- Released: 20 June 2014
- Recorded: New Holland Studio, Sydney
- Genre: Pop-country
- Length: 3:12
- Label: Sony
- Songwriters: Taylor Henderson; Alex Hope; Louis Schoorl
- Producer: Louis Schoorl

Taylor Henderson singles chronology
"When You Were Mine" (2014)	"Already Gone" (2014)	"Host of Angels" (2014)

"Already Gone" is a song recorded by Australian singer and songwriter Taylor Henderson for his second studio album, Burnt Letters. Released as the second single from the album on 20 June 2014, it was written by Henderson, Louis Schoorl and Alex Hope and produced by Schoorl. The song's development was motivated by the fact that Henderson wanted to write a song about being away from home and missing his loved ones. Lyrically, "Already Gone" finds Henderson being torn "between living his musical dreams and pining for the simple way things used to be."

"Already Gone" received a positive reception from various publications, who complimented the production and Henderson's vocals. Upon its release, "Already Gone" debuted at number 42 on the ARIA Singles Chart. The accompanying music video was directed by Lawrence Lim and features Henderson in a recording studio and in his apartment putting photos of his loved ones on the wall. Henderson promoted the song with performances on television programs.

== Writing and production ==
Taylor Henderson co-wrote "Already Gone" with Alex Hope and Louis Schoorl for his second studio album Burnt Letters. The trio also performed background vocals on the song. "Already Gone" was recorded, engineered and mixed by Schoorl, while the mastering was done by Leon Zervos. Schoorl also provided the bass, drums, piano and programming. Both Schoorl and Hope also played the percussion, while Henderson and Schoorl played the guitar. The concept of the song came from Henderson wanting to write about being away from home and missing his loved ones, as it is "one of the day-to-day things" he has to deal with. "Already Gone" was written in 45 minutes after Henderson could not return home because of a last-minute schedule change. The lyrics are about Henderson being torn "between living his musical dreams and pining for the simple way things used to be."

== Release and reception ==
Henderson announced the single's release by uploading an audio teaser video to his Vevo account on 11 June 2014. "Already Gone" was then made available for digital download on 20 June 2014. Speaking of his decision to release "Already Gone" as the next single from Burnt Letters, Henderson said: "The thing is that if I brought out another love song, I'd be shot. I'm constantly singing about love, and so I just felt I wanted to change it up a bit lyrically with the new single, and I also wanted to pick up the tempo to show off the diversity on the album." An acoustic version of the song is included on Henderson's extended play, The Acoustic Sessions.

Take 40 Australia described "Already Gone" as a "heartbreakingly bittersweet song", while Nova FM called it a "catchy tune" and believed it to be "one of those songs that really gets stuck in your head." Marcus Floyd from Renowned for Sound compared "Already Gone" to its predecessor "When You Were Mine", saying that the former "isn't as memorable, but it still has a nice stripped back feel and a chance for Henderson to show off that high range of his." Upon its release, "Already Gone" debuted and peaked at number 42 on the ARIA Singles Chart issue dated 30 June 2014. In its second week, the song dropped thirty-seven places to number 79. However, after the release of its music video, "Already Gone" moved back up to number 45 in its third week.

== Promotion ==
The music video was directed by Lawrence Lim and filmed on two days in June 2014. A behind-the-scenes clip of the shoot was first shown on Sunrise on 30 June 2014, and later uploaded to Henderson's Vevo account on 1 July 2014. The official video was released on 3 July 2014. It features scenes of Henderson in a recording studio working on the lyrics for "Already Gone" and scenes of him in his apartment putting photos of his family and friends on the wall. At the end of the video, Henderson arrives at his family home, while a collage of the photos on the wall is shown. Take 40 Australia described the video as "flawless". Henderson performed "Already Gone" on Sunrise (11 July 2014), The Riff (18 July 2014) and The Footy Show (24 July 2014).

== Track listing ==
- Digital download
1. "Already Gone" – 3:12

== Credits and personnel ==
Credits adapted from the liner notes of Burnt Letters.

Locations

- Recorded at New Holland Studio in Sydney.
- Mastered at Studios 301 in Sydney.

Personnel

- Songwriting – Taylor Henderson, Alex Hope, Louis Schoorl
- Production – Louis Schoorl
- Engineering – Louis Schoorl
- Mixing – Louis Schoorl
- Recording – Louis Schoorl
- Bass, drums, piano, and programming – Louis Schoorl
- Percussion – Louis Schoorl and Alex Hope
- Guitars – Taylor Henderson and Louis Schoorl
- Background vocals – Taylor Henderson, Alex Hope, Louis Schoorl
- Mastering – Leon Zervos

== Charts ==
Chart (2014)	Peak position
Australia (ARIA)	42

== Release history ==
Country	Date	Format	Label
Australia	20 June 2014	Digital download	Sony Music Australia
New Zealand	20 June 2014	Digital download	Sony Music Australia
