= I Am Australian =

1987 song by Woodley & Newton

"I Am Australian" (or "We Are Australian") is a popular Australian song written in 1987 by Bruce Woodley of the Seekers and Dobe Newton of the Bushwackers. Its lyrics are filled with many historic and cultural references, such as to the "digger", Albert Namatjira and Ned Kelly, among others. Its popularity has made it one of a number of Australian patriotic songs considered as alternatives to the national anthem, "Advance Australia Fair". In the years since the song's release, there have been calls for it to become Australia's national anthem, notably in 2011 by former Victorian Premier Jeff Kennett.

== First release ==
The song was first released as the final track on Bruce Woodley's 1987 double album Roaring Days/I Am Australian, with vocals by Woodley and his daughter Claire.

== Festivities ==
"I Am Australian" is popular at celebrations such as Australia Day and New Year's Day.

It is often sung by Australian fans at sporting events. It was sung by the Seekers at the 1994 AFL Grand Final.

It was often played at citizenship ceremonies from 2008 until 2012 when the Copyright Tribunal ruled that this was a copyright infringement and ordered the Federal Government to pay Bruce Woodley $149,743.34 in compensation.

It was one of the final numbers performed at the 2016 Royal Edinburgh Military Tattoo hosted at Marvel Stadium (previously Etihad Stadium at the time) in Melbourne. It was sung primarily by Australian military personnel with backing vocals and musical accompaniment by the combined acts of the Tattoo.

Spectators seated in the public gallery of the Australian House of Representatives erupted into applause and sang part of "I am Australian" when Parliament voted on and legalised same-sex marriage on 7 December 2017.

== Appeals ==
In 1996, the Salvation Army used the song in TV advertisements for its Red Shield Appeal.

The song was used by the Australian Republican Movement in radio and television advertisements during the 1999 Australian republic referendum.

In October 2003, in conjunction with the sponsorship of the 2003 Rugby World Cup, Australian telecommunications giant Telstra launched a new campaign centred on the song remixed and performed by Rai Thistlethwayte. The campaign was produced by advertising company Young and Rubicam.

In aid of the Farmhand Foundation's Drought Relief Appeal, Telstra released a CD of the Rai Thistlethwayte rework that sold for $6. A total of $100,000 was raised from the profits ($4.05 per CD) generated from the sale of the CD. The actual published copy of the CD credits "Performed by: Rai Thistlewayte & other artists" and "Music re-arranged by: Rai Thistlewayte".

In 2008, Telstra used a different version of the song recorded by the Sydney band, Botanics, for advertising their mobile coverage of the Beijing 2008 Olympic Games.

In 2009, two additional verses were added to show remembrance during the official National Day of Mourning for the victims of the Black Saturday bushfires. Woodley performed the song along with his daughter Clare and Kinglake fire survivors Merelyn and David Carter during the memorial service at the Rod Laver Arena in Melbourne on 22 February. This version peaked at number 56 on the ARIA Charts in March 2009.

== Cover versions ==
=== 1997 ===
"I Am Australian"

Single by Judith Durham, Russell Hitchcock & Mandawuy Yunupingu

from the album Always There
- Released: January 1997
- Recorded: 1997
- Label: EMI Australia
- Songwriters: Bruce Woodley and Dobe Newton

Audio video
- "I Am Australian" on YouTube

"I Am Australian" was released in 1997 by trio Judith Durham (of the Seekers), Russell Hitchcock (from Air Supply) and Yothu Yindi's Mandawuy Yunupingu. EMI Australia released the single and it reached number 17 on the Australian ARIA Singles Chart.

In November 2023, the National Film and Sound Archive added this version of I Am Australian to the Sounds of Australia register for songs of "cultural, historical and aesthetic significance and relevance".

==== Chart performance ====
Chart (1997)	Peak position
Australia (ARIA)	17

=== 2014 ===
"I Am Australian"

Single by Dami Im, Jessica Mauboy, Justice Crew, Nathaniel Willemse, Samantha Jade and Taylor Henderson featuring John Foreman
- Released: 24 January 2014
- Recorded: January 2014
- Length: 3:36
- Label: Sony
- Songwriters: Bruce Woodley and Dobe Newton

Dami Im singles chronology
"Alive" (2013)	"I Am Australian" (2014)	"Jolene (Acoustic)" (2014)

Jessica Mauboy singles chronology
"Beautiful" (2013)	"I Am Australian" (2014)	"Never Be the Same" (2014)

Justice Crew singles chronology
"Everybody" (2013)	"I Am Australian" (2014)	"Que Sera" (2014)

Nathaniel Willemse singles chronology
"You" (2013)	"I Am Australian" (2014)	"You're Beautiful" (2014)

Samantha Jade singles chronology
"Soldier" (2013)	"I Am Australian" (2014)	"Up!" (2014)

Taylor Henderson singles chronology
"Borrow My Heart" (2013)	"I Am Australian" (2014)	"When You Were Mine" (2014)

Audio video
- "I Am Australian" on YouTube

"I Am Australian" was covered in 2014 by Dami Im, Jessica Mauboy, Justice Crew, Nathaniel Willemse, Samantha Jade and Taylor Henderson, with John Foreman on piano. Sony Music Australia released their cover as a single on 24 January 2014, as part of Sydney's Australia Day celebrations.

On recording the song, the artists said:

- Jessica Mauboy: "WOW.... what a song. What an honour. I love Australia Day and I am so thrilled to be a part of this recording. It was such an amazing experience recording the song I and cannot wait to sing it again live on beautiful Sydney Harbour."
- Samantha Jade: "I just love this song. It really embodies the Australian spirit of inclusivity and it sends out a message that no matter where you were born or what colour your skin is, we all enjoy celebrating being Australian."
- Justice Crew: "What an honour it is to be a part of this recording. We used to sing this song at school assembly and now to be a part of the special Sony Music recording with some of the best singers in the country is such a buzz."
- Nathaniel: "Being born in South Africa and then moving to Australia at 6 years old, to now being a part of this very patriotic and special day is amazing. To be singing one of the most iconic songs of Australia and to be releasing it amongst other featured incredible artists is a privilege and an absolute honour and I am so grateful to be a part of it."
- Dami Im: "What a unique and wonderful collaboration to be a part of. 'I Am Australian' is such a patriotic song that represents togetherness and the Australian spirit and what better way to celebrate this than through music."
- Taylor Henderson: "It is such an amazing experience to work alongside the Sony family on such a special release. A year ago I was a proud Australian singing this song with my family and now to be a part of this official recording with my name alongside the other amazing talents on the record is such an honour. This song is so typically Australian and I am so proud to be a part of it."

A live video is available for the Take 40! website of the artists singing the song on a floating stage in the middle of Sydney Harbour.

==== Chart performance ====
Chart (2014)	Peak position
Australia (ARIA)	51

=== 2018–present ===
"I Am Australian" was covered in 2018 by the Australian Broadcasting Corporation as part of their new brand positioning under its tagline, Yours. The song was reinterpreted by Triple J Unearthed artist Emily Wurramara. Two television spots were also produced and aired by the broadcaster, one of which was translated by Yawuru traditional owners and covered in Yawuru language by primary school students in Broome, Western Australia.

The ABC then produced and aired additional promotions in April 2020 as part of a 'National Sing-along' campaign. These consisted of various everyday Australians, in isolation due to the stay-at-home orders imposed by federal, state and territory governments during the COVID-19 pandemic, each of which covered the song in front of a video camera from their homes. Other arrangements include those covered in Yawuru by 'physically distanced' primary school students in Broome, as well as in Auslan, interpreted by various sign language interpreters in home isolation. Prominent celebrities featured in these promotions include Isaiah Firebrace, Olivia Newton-John and Emma Watkins.

In 2019, "I Am Australian" was released as a single by Australian soprano Mirusia, and it was later released on her album A Salute to The Seekers, which debuted at the #1 position on the ARIA Blues and Jazz Charts.

In 2023, Dobe Newton and Roger Corbett of The Bushwackers sang a rendition of "I Am Australian", which Newton co-wrote, in their audition on the twelfth season of The Voice Australia, in which they received a four-chair turn before securing a place on coach Jessica Mauboy's team.

== Other recorded versions ==
- 1996: Stewart Peters
- 1999: The Goanna Gang
- 1999: Aussie Bush Band
- 2003: Jeff Turner
- 2003: Rai Thistlethwayte
- 2006: Travis Collins
- 2006: Bruce McCumstie
- 2008: Lazy Harry
- 2009: Dobe Newton
- 2009: Yabu Band
- 2011: The Bushwackers
- 2011: Danny Elliott
- 2012: Brian Sutton
