= QNews =

Australian LGBT+ news outlet

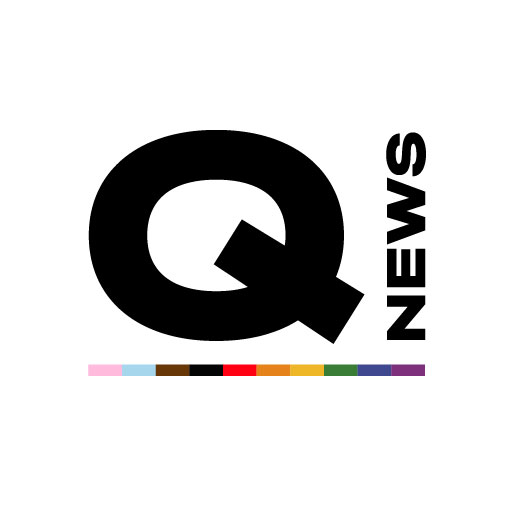
- Editor: Destiny Rogers, Jordan Hirst, Nate Woodall, Andrew Potts, Dale Roberts.
- Staff writers: Andrew Blythe, Sarah Davison, Richard Bakker, Mitch Broom, Blair Martin, Brooke Tindal
- Categories: LGBTIQ publication
- Frequency: Monthly
- Circulation: 31,000
- Publisher: Richard Bakker
- First issue: December 2000
- Country: Australia
- Based in: Brisbane
- Language: English
- Website: www.qnews.com.au
- ISSN: 1833-4830

QNews is an Australian online news outlet based in Brisbane, Queensland catering to the lesbian, gay, bisexual, transgender, intersex and queer communities in Australia. The first issue was published in December 2000.

== History ==
QNews was formed in December 2000 following the demise of predecessor publication Brother Sister amidst the collapse of national LGBT publisher Satellite Media. The first edition of QNews was released on 15 December that year. It was operated by Ray Mackereth, who had previously run Brother Sister for Satellite Media. A fortnightly publication from the beginning, it was originally printed as a tabloid newspaper, but changed to a fortnightly magazine in 2005. Historian Shirleene Robinson described QNews as being less "highbrow" than its then-rival publication, Queensland Pride.

In 2013, under earlier ownership, The Australian reported claims that QNews had inflated its distribution figures, alleging that the publication was claiming that it had distributed approximately double the number of copies than had actually been printed. It suggested that the magazine's distribution at that time was averaging approximately 8,500 copies.

In 2015, the company ran into financial difficulties and was facing closure, with the operators needing a crowdfunding campaign to keep the publication alive for long enough to secure a new publisher. It faced further issues later that year after its then owner, Ray Mackereth, filed for bankruptcy. Later that month, it was sold to Queensland businessman Richard Bakker.

In October 2018, QNews appointed a transgender managing editor, Destiny Rogers, reportedly the first Australian publication to do so.

In July 2023, "QNews" launched in New South Wales with 500 additional distribution outlets across the state and is looking to expand across Australia.

== Content ==
QNews is an Australian-focused LGBTIQ monthly lifestyle magazine catering to members of the Australian LGBTIQ community and their allies. The magazine covers local and national LGBTIQ current affairs, community issues, health, entertainment and culture. The print publication and website are available for free and supported entirely by advertising.

The company regularly partners with LGBTIQ community groups around Queensland and northern New South Wales, including Brisbane Pride, Cairns Tropical Pride and Tropical Fruits.

In April 2016, the publication released its 400th issue and celebrated what it claimed was a record for the largest number of issues for a Queensland LGBTIQ print publication.

== Distribution ==
QNews currently has over 900 distribution points, throughout Queensland and New South Wales.

The print magazine is also published online each fortnight.
