= Taylor Henderson (album) =

Studio album by Taylor Henderson
- Released: 29 November 2013
- Recorded: 2013
- Genre: Pop
- Label: Sony
- Producers: Louis Schoorl; Dorian West

Taylor Henderson chronology
Taylor Henderson (2013)	The Acoustic Sessions (2014)

Singles from Taylor Henderson
- 1. "Borrow My Heart" Released: 1 November 2013

Taylor Henderson is the debut studio album by Taylor Henderson, the runner-up of the fifth season of The X Factor Australia, released through Sony Music Australia on 29 November 2013. The album debuted at number one on the ARIA Albums Chart and was certified Platinum by the Australian Recording Industry Association.

== Background ==
After finishing second in the fifth season of The X Factor Australia in 2013, Henderson signed a recording contract with Sony Music Australia. It was announced on 8 November 2013 that Henderson would be releasing his self-titled debut album. The album contains his debut single "Borrow My Heart" along with ten recorded versions of songs he performed on The X Factor.

== Critical reception ==
Ahead of the album's release, Renowned for Sound published a five-star review which praised Henderson's time on The X Factor Australia as being "the most versatile and well-rounded contestant on the show". The article states about the album and Henderson's performance: "Taylor Henderson has a voice that you can’t help but want to listen to, no matter what he’s singing. Part of what makes him so exceptional is that his voice always has the right tone for the right song, and doesn’t make the mistake of over-singing like so many others".

== Track listing ==
No.	Title	Writer(s)	Producer(s)	Length
1.	"Borrow My Heart"	Louis Schoorl; Hayley Warner; Alex Hope	Louis Schoorl	3:33
2.	"I Won't Let You Go" (James Morrison song)	James Morrison; Steve Robson; Martin Brammer	Dorian West	3:22
3.	"I Will Wait" (Mumford & Sons song)	Marcus Mumford	West	3:47
4.	"Let Her Go" (Passenger song)	Mike Rosenberg	West	3:52
5.	"Choirgirl" (Cold Chisel song)	Don Walker	West	3:12
6.	"The Horses" (Daryl Braithwaite song)	Rickie Lee Jones; Walter Becker	West	3:26
7.	"One Crowded Hour" (Augie March song)	Glenn Richards	West	3:36
8.	"Girls Just Want to Have Fun" (Cyndi Lauper song)	Robert Hazard	West	3:18
9.	"Some Nights" (Fun song)	Jeff Bhasker; Nate Ruess; Andrew Dost; Jack Antonoff	West	4:04
10.	"The Blower's Daughter" (Damien Rice song)	Damien Rice	West	3:06
11.	"Human Nature" (Michael Jackson song)	Steve Porcaro; John Bettis	West	3:36

== Charts ==
=== Weekly charts ===
Chart (2013)	Peak position
Australian Albums (ARIA)	1

=== Year-end charts ===
Chart (2013)	Rank
Australian Albums (ARIA)	20
Australian Artist Albums (ARIA)	5

Chart (2014)	Rank
Australian Artist Albums (ARIA)	36

== Certifications ==
Region	Certification	Certified units/sales
Australia (ARIA)	Platinum	70,000^{^}
^{^} Shipments figures based on certification alone.

== Release history ==
Region	Date	Format	Label	Catalogue
Australia	29 November 2013	CD, digital download	Sony Music Australia	88843013132

== See also ==
- List of number-one albums of 2013 (Australia)
