= The X Factor (Australian TV series) season 5 =

The X Factor
- Season 5
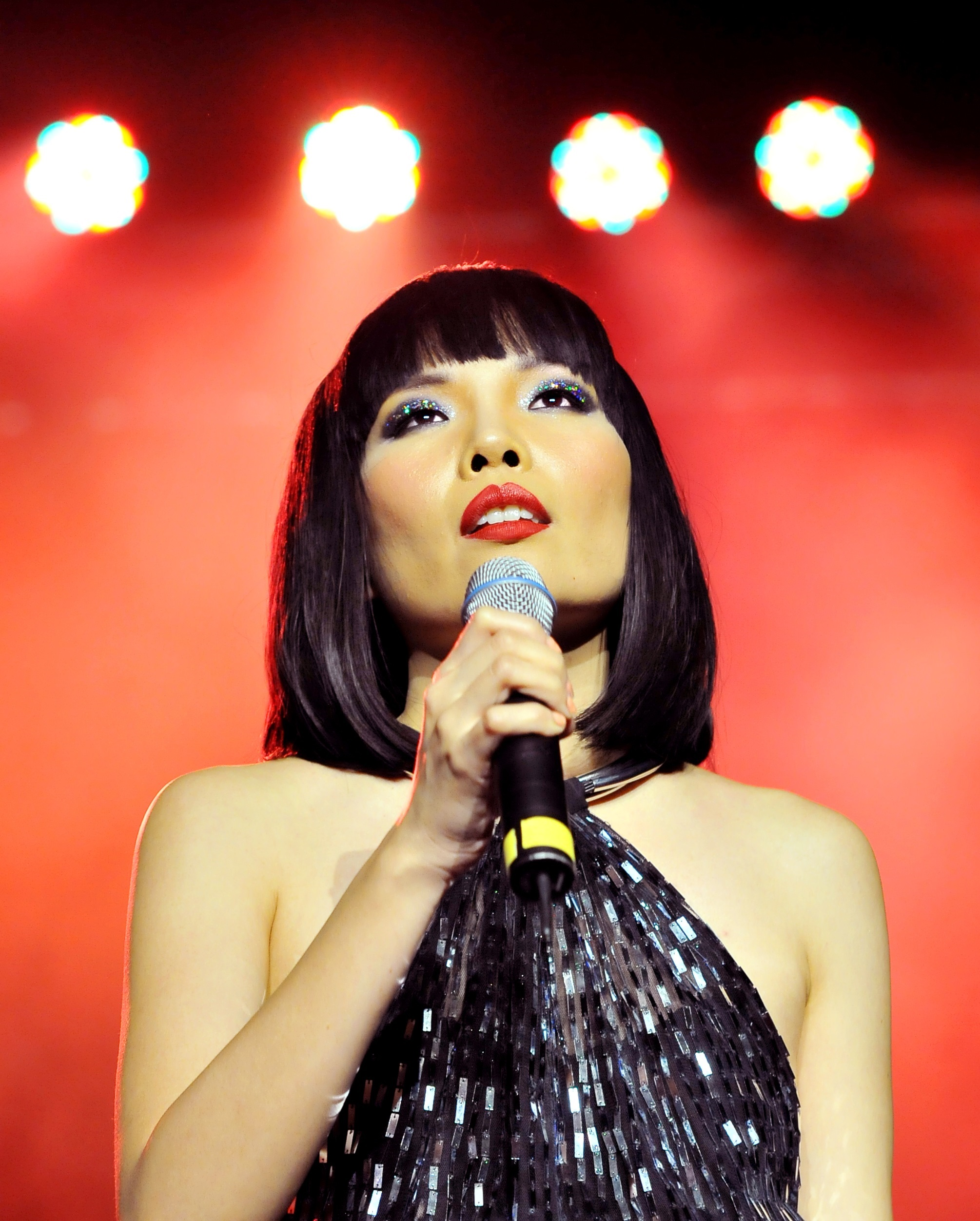
- Hosted by: Luke Jacobz
- Judges: Redfoo; Dannii Minogue; Natalie Bassingthwaighte; Ronan Keating
- Winner: Dami Im
- Winning mentor: Dannii Minogue
- Runner-up: Taylor Henderson

Release
- Original network: Seven Network
- Original release: 29 July – 28 October 2013

Season chronology
- ← Previous; Season 4 Next → Season 6

The X Factor is an Australian television reality music competition, based on the original UK series, to find new singing talent; the winner of which received a Sony Music Australia recording contract and a management deal. The fifth season premiered on the Seven Network on 29 July 2013 and ended on 28 October 2013. The winner was Dami Im and her winner's single "Alive" was released after the final. Im was mentored throughout by Dannii Minogue, who won as mentor for the first time on the Australian series, and third overall. The show was presented by Luke Jacobz, and Ronan Keating and Natalie Bassingthwaighte returned as judges. Minogue and Redfoo joined the judging panel as replacements for former judges, Mel B (who quit the show to join America's Got Talent) and Guy Sebastian.

Open auditions in front of the show's producers took place in 14 cities throughout December 2012 and January 2013. The last set of auditions, in front of the judges and a live studio audience, were filmed in April. Following auditions was super bootcamp, where Keating, Minogue and Redfoo worked together and collectively chose 24 acts (six from each category). Bassingthwaighte did not attend the Sydney auditions and bootcamp because she was pregnant at the time and was advised not to fly from her home in Melbourne. During bootcamp, the Over 25s category was changed to Over 24s. Bassingthwaighte returned for the home visits stage, and each judge reduced their six acts to three. They were also assisted by guest mentors Jon Bon Jovi, will.i.am, Kylie Minogue, Kelly Osbourne and Sebastian.

The live shows, which began on 25 August 2013, returned to Sunday and Monday nights as seen in season two. This was a change of format from seasons three and four, in which the live shows were broadcast on Monday and Tuesday nights.

== Judges ==
Season 5 judges

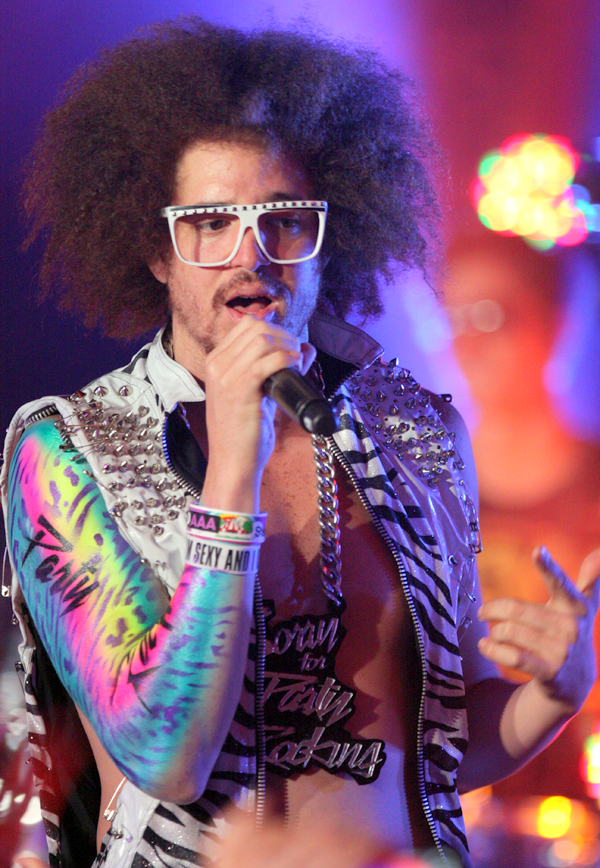
Redfoo

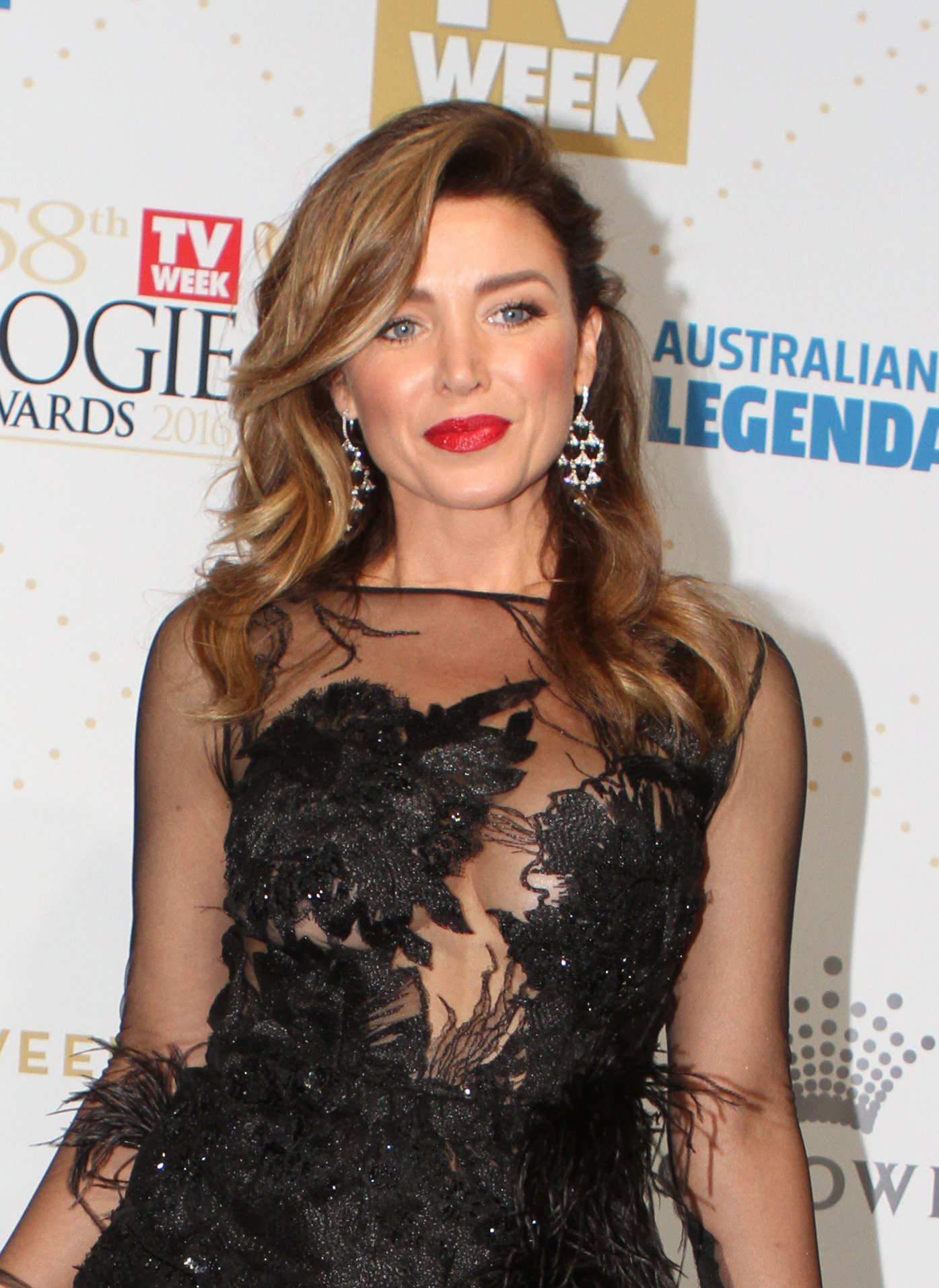
Dannii Minogue

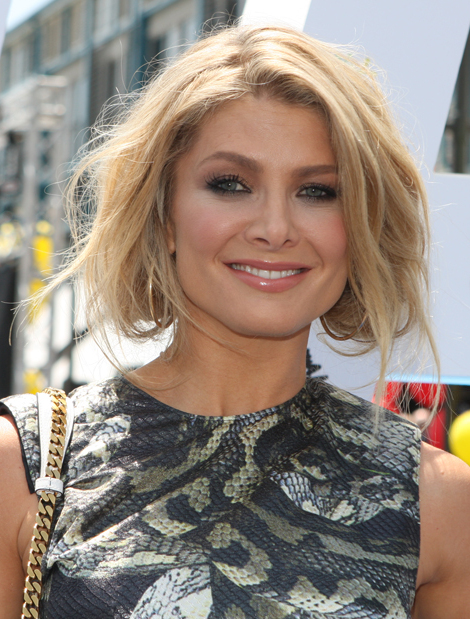
Natalie Bassingthwaighte

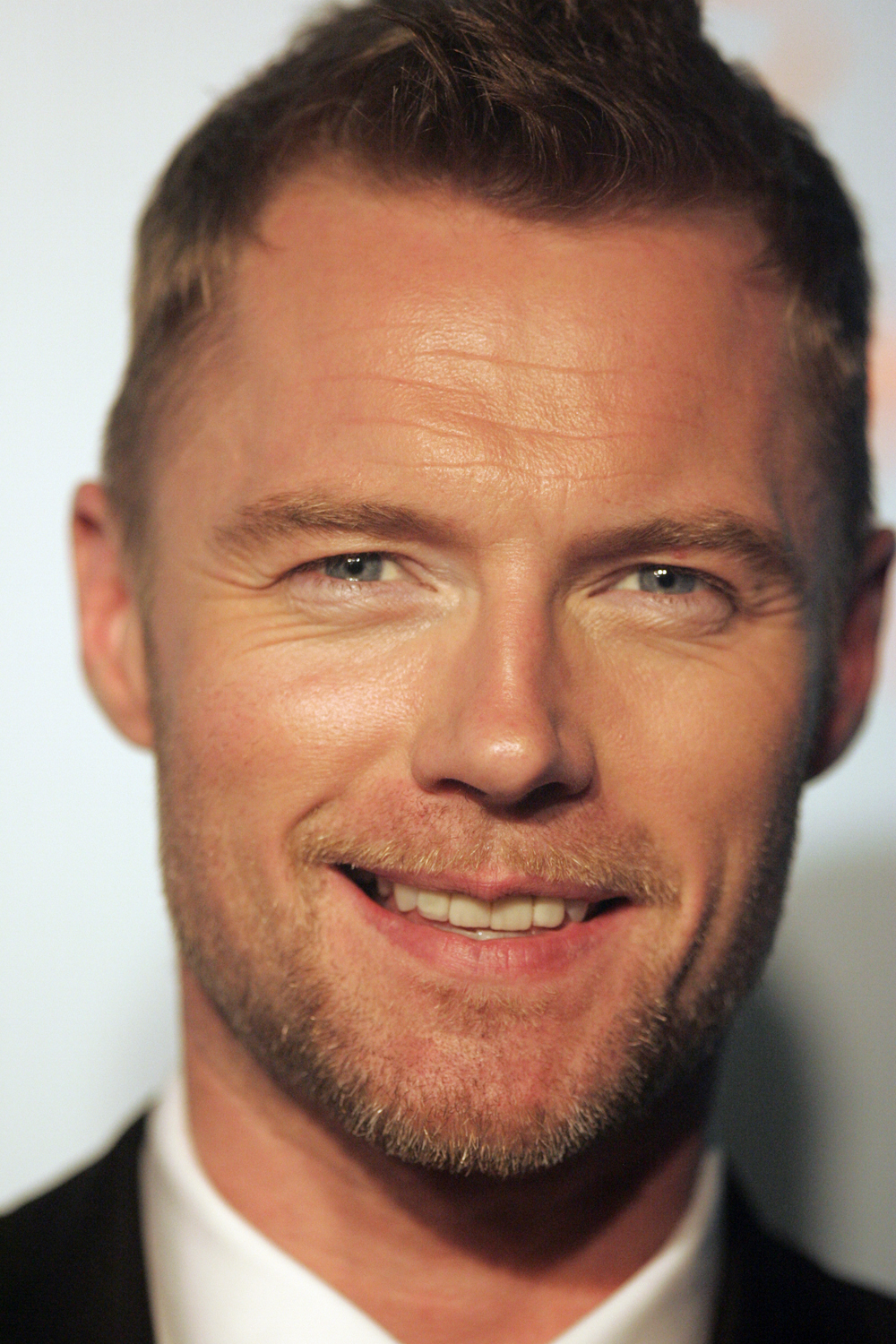
Ronan Keating

In February 2013, it was reported that Guy Sebastian would not be returning for season 5, due to tour commitments and to focus on a music career in the United States. It was also reported that Mel B was not returning, due to visa issues in Australia and her commitments with America's Got Talent. The following month, Ronan Keating confirmed in an interview with News Limited that both judges had left. Former judge on The X Factor UK, Dannii Minogue was announced as Mel B's replacement on 12 April. The Sunday Telegraph confirmed on 21 April that Redfoo would be Sebastian's replacement.

Redfoo was offered the opportunity to join the judging panel during his visit to Australia for the 2013 Australian Open, where he was supporting girlfriend and then-World number-one Victoria Azarenka. The producers later visited his recording studio in Hollywood and explained to him what The X Factor is about. In an interview with The West Australian, Redfoo said "they basically explained the show because I didn't know if I wanted to just be a judge. And they said 'Wait a second, wait a second, no it's not just judging, that's just to pick your team. Then you're really a mentor, you're going to be mentoring a category.' Then they said 'You can be a winner too.'" Minogue revealed to The Daily Telegraph that she was offered many other TV roles but chose to join The X Factor because she had always been a fan of the Australian version.

== Selection process ==
=== Auditions ===
Open auditions in front of the show's producers began in December 2012 and ended in January 2013. These auditions took place in 14 cities. Online and DVD auditions were also introduced into the season for those who could not attend the open auditions. The auditionees chosen by the producers were then invited back to the last set of auditions that took place in front of the judges and a live studio audience. These auditions were filmed at Allphones Arena in Sydney on 21, 22 and 23 April, and at Hisense Arena in Melbourne on 28, 29 and 30 April. Natalie Bassingthwaighte did not attend the Sydney auditions because she was pregnant at the time and was advised not to fly from her home in Melbourne.

Open auditions
City	Dates	Venue
Launceston	1 December 2012	Hotel Grand Chancellor
Hobart	2 December 2012	Hotel Grand Chancellor
Albury	5 December 2012	Albury Entertainment Centre
Dubbo	7 December 2012	Western Plains Cultural Centre
Darwin	10 December 2012	Crowne Plaza Hotel
Alice Springs	11 December 2012	Alice Springs Convention Centre
Townsville	13 December 2012	Reid Park Precinct
Brisbane	15–16 December 2012	Sofitel Brisbane
Melbourne	12–14 January 2013	Caulfield Racecourse
Adelaide	17 January 2013	Adelaide Convention Centre
Perth	19–20 January 2013	Parmelia Hilton
Kalgoorlie	22 January 2013	Goldfields Arts Centre
Sydney	25–27 January 2013	Sydney Cricket Ground
Newcastle	30 January 2013	Hunter Stadium

Judges' auditions
City	Dates	Venue	Absent judge
Sydney	21–23 April 2013	Allphones Arena	—N/a
Melbourne	28–30 April 2013	Hisense Arena	Natalie Bassingthwaighte

=== Super bootcamp ===
The super bootcamp stage of the competition was filmed at The Star casino in Pyrmont, New South Wales. Bassingthwaighte did not attend because she was on maternity leave. The first day of bootcamp saw the judges split the 150 acts into four categories: Boys, Girls, Over 25s and Groups. Each act performed one song in front of their entire category and the judges. At the end of the day, the judges sent home 75 acts. On the second day, the remaining acts were put into ensembles of 10 and were each given a song which they had to learn and perform for the judges. Season four winner Samantha Jade helped each ensemble with stage presence and choreography. The judges sent home more acts, but called back some rejected soloists from the Boys and Girls categories to form three supergroups – a boy band (consisting of Fabian Andres, Zac Hakos, Jayden Rodrigues and Nick Tabone), girl group (consisting of Jessica Kent, Dina Knoweiss, Rebecca Quinn and Carla Wehbe) and unisex group (consisting of Kelebek, Jacinta Gulisano and Jordan Rodrigues). On the third day, the remaining 50 acts each individually performed one song to the judges and a live audience of one thousand. After the performances, the judges narrowed down the acts to 24. Redfoo suggested that the Over 25s category be changed to Over 24s. The judges removed Zac Hakos from the boy band because they felt his heart was not in the group.

The 24 successful acts were:

- Boys: Georgie Bannard, Omar Dean, Taylor Henderson, Mitchell Thompson, Ofisa "Tee" Toleafoa, Jai Waetford
- Girls: Joelle Hadjia, Ellie Lovegrove, Georgina Mastin, Riv Ngwenya, Jiordan Tolli, Vendulka Wichta
- Over 24s: Tyler Hudson, Dami Im, Michael Ross, Barry Southgate, Gemma Thorpe, Cat Vas
- Groups: Adira–Belle, Boy Band, Girl Group, JTR, Straight Up, Third Degree

Matt Gresham had originally been put through to Home Visits in the Over 24s category but decided he could not commit to the competition and was replaced by Dami Im.

=== Home visits ===
The home visits round was filmed in June 2013 and saw the remaining 24 acts travel to exclusive locations around the world to find out which judge would become their mentor. The judges received news of their categories from The X Factor creator Simon Cowell by telephone. The Over 24s travelled to New York City and were assigned to Dannii Minogue, the Groups travelled to Sir Richard Branson's Makepeace Island in Sunshine Coast, Queensland and were assigned to Natalie Bassingthwaighte, the Boys travelled to Los Angeles and were assigned to Ronan Keating, and the Girls travelled to London and were assigned to Redfoo. The first day of home visits saw each act having a private mentoring session with their mentor, ahead of their solo performance in front of their mentor and guest mentor the next day. Redfoo was assisted by Jon Bon Jovi during the mentoring sessions for the Girls.

On the second day, each judge was given a guest mentor to help them decide their final three acts. Bassingthwaighte was assisted by former X Factor judge Guy Sebastian, Redfoo was assisted by will.i.am, Keating was assisted by Kelly Osbourne (who replaced Miley Cyrus due to laryngitis) and Minogue was assisted by her older sister Kylie.

Summary of home visits
Judge	Category	Location	Assistant(s)	Contestants eliminated
Keating	Boys	Los Angeles	Kelly Osbourne	Georgie Bannard, Mitchell Thompson, Ofisa "Tee" Toleafoa
Redfoo	Girls	London	Jon Bon Jovi will.i.am	Georgina Mastin, Riv Ngwenya, Vendulka Wichta
Minogue	Over 24s	New York City	Kylie Minogue	Tyler Hudson, Michael Ross, Gemma Thorpe
Bassingthwaighte	Groups	Makepeace Island	Guy Sebastian	Boy Band, Girl Group, Straight Up

== Acts ==
Key:

– Winner
– Runner-Up

Act	Age(s)	Hometown	Category (mentor)	Result
Dami Im	25	Daisy Hill, Queensland	Over 24s (Minogue)	Winner
Taylor Henderson	20	Ceres, Victoria	Boys (Keating)	Runner-Up
Jai Waetford	14	Campbelltown, New South Wales	Boys (Keating)	3rd Place
Third Degree	18–19	Various	Groups (Bassingthwaighte)	4th Place
Jiordan Tolli	19	Melbourne	Girls (Redfoo)	5th Place
Omar Dean	20	Melbourne, Victoria	Boys (Keating)	6th Place
JTR	19–23	Sweden/Cornubia, Queensland	Groups (Bassingthwaighte)	7th Place
Joelle	22	Sydney	Girls (Redfoo)	8th Place
Ellie Lovegrove	19	Adelaide, South Australia	Girls (Redfoo)	9th Place
Barry Southgate	30	Kellyville, Queensland	Over 24s (Minogue)	10th Place
Cat Vas	27	Adelaide, South Australia	Over 24s (Minogue)	11th Place
Adira Belle	17–19	Sydney, New South Wales	Groups (Bassingthwaighte)	12th Place

== Live shows ==
=== Results summary ===
Colour key

Act in Team Dannii
Act in Team Redfoo
Act in Team Natalie Bassingthwaighte
Act in Team Ronan

– Act in the bottom two and had to perform again in the final showdown
– Act received the fewest public votes and was immediately eliminated (no final showdown)

Weekly results per act
Act	Week 1	Week 2	Week 3	Week 4	Week 5	Week 6	Week 7	Quarter-Final	Semi-Final	Final	
Act	Week 1	Week 2	Week 3	Week 4	Week 5	Week 6	Week 7	Quarter-Final	Semi-Final	Sunday Vote	Monday Vote
Dami Im	Safe	Safe	Safe	Safe	Safe	Safe	Safe	Safe	Safe	Safe	Winner
Taylor Henderson	Safe	Safe	Safe	Safe	Safe	Safe	Safe	Safe	3rd	Safe	Runner-Up
Jai Waetford	Safe	Safe	Safe	Safe	Safe	Safe	Safe	Safe	Safe	3rd	Eliminated (Final)
Third Degree	Safe	Safe	Safe	Safe	Safe	Bottom Two	Safe	4th	4th	Eliminated (Semi-Final)	
Jiordan Tolli	Safe	Safe	Safe	Safe	Bottom Two	Safe	5th	5th	Eliminated (Quarter-Final)		
Omar Dean	Safe	Safe	Safe	Safe	Safe	Safe	6th	Eliminated (Week 7)			
JTR	Safe	Safe	Bottom Two	8th	Safe	Bottom Two	Eliminated (Week 6)				
Joelle Hadjia	Safe	Bottom Two	Safe	Safe	Bottom Two	Eliminated (Week 5)					
Ellie Lovegrove	Safe	Safe	Safe	9th	Eliminated (Week 4)						
Barry Southgate	Bottom Two	Safe	Bottom Two	Eliminated (Week 3)							
Cat Vas	Safe	Bottom Two	Eliminated (Week 2)								
Adira–Belle	Bottom Two	Eliminated (Week 1)									
Final Showdown	Adira-Belle, Southgate	Vas, Joelle	JTR, Southgate	Lovegrove, JTR	Joelle, Tolli	JTR, Third Degree	Dean, Tolli	Tolli, Third Degree	Henderson, Third Degree	No bottom two/judges' vote; public votes alone decide who wins	
Judges voted to	Eliminate								Send Through	No bottom two/judges' vote; public votes alone decide who wins	
Keating's vote (Boys)	Adira-Belle	Vas	Southgate	JTR	Joelle	JTR	Tolli	Third Degree	Henderson	No bottom two/judges' vote; public votes alone decide who wins	
Bassingthwaighte's vote (Groups)	Southgate	Vas	Southgate	Lovegrove	Joelle	—N/a^{2}	Dean	Tolli	Third Degree	No bottom two/judges' vote; public votes alone decide who wins	
Minogue's vote (Over 24s)	Adira-Belle	Joelle	JTR	Lovegrove	Joelle	JTR	Tolli	Tolli	Third Degree	No bottom two/judges' vote; public votes alone decide who wins	
Redfoo's vote (Girls)	Adira-Belle	Vas	Southgate	JTR	—N/a^{1}	JTR	Dean	Third Degree	Henderson	No bottom two/judges' vote; public votes alone decide who wins	
Eliminated	Adira-Belle; 3 of 4 votes Majority	Cat Vas; 3 of 4 votes Majority	Barry Southgate; 3 of 4 votes Majority	Ellie Lovegrove; 2 of 4 votes Deadlock	Joelle; 3 of 3 votes Majority	JTR; 3 of 3 votes Majority	Omar Dean; 2 of 4 votes Deadlock	Jiordan Tolli; 2 of 4 votes Deadlock	Third Degree; 2 of 4 votes Deadlock	Jai Waetford; Public Vote; To Win	Taylor Henderson; Public Vote; To Win

Notes

- ^{1} Redfoo was not required to vote as there was already a majority.
- ^{2} Bassingthwaighte was not required to vote as there was already a majority.

=== Live show details ===
==== Week 1 (25/26 August) ====
- Theme: Judges' Choice
- Group performance: "I Like It"
- Celebrity performers: Samantha Jade ("Firestarter") and Jessie J ("It's My Party")

Acts' performances on the first live show
Act	Category (mentor)	Order	Song	Result
Third Degree	Groups (Bassingthwaighte)	1	"#thatPOWER"	Safe
Barry Southgate	Over 24s (Minogue)	2	"When I Get You Alone"	Bottom Two
Jiordan Tolli	Girls (Redfoo)	3	"Smile"	Safe
Taylor Henderson	Boys (Keating)	4	"I Won't Let You Go"	Safe
Cat Vas	Over 24s (Minogue)	5	"Addicted to Love"	Safe
Adira–Belle	Groups (Bassingthwaighte)	6	"Run the World (Girls)"	Bottom Two
Ellie Lovegrove	Girls (Redfoo)	7	"Songbird"	Safe
JTR	Groups (Bassingthwaighte)	8	"Everything Has Changed"	Safe
Omar Dean	Boys (Keating)	9	"Numb"	Safe
Dami Im	Over 24s (Minogue)	10	"One"	Safe
Joelle	Girls (Redfoo)	11	"Sweet Nothing"	Safe
Jai Waetford	Boys (Keating)	12	"Fix You"	Safe
Final showdown details
Act	Category (mentor)	Order	Song	Result
Adira–Belle	Groups (Bassingthwaighte)	1	"Chain of Fools"	Eliminated
Barry Southgate	Over 24s (Minogue)	2	"Irreplaceable"	Safe

Judges' vote to eliminate

- Bassingthwaighte: Barry Southgate – backed her own act, Adira–Belle.
- Minogue: Adira–Belle – backed her own act, Barry Southgate.
- Redfoo: Adira–Belle – based his decision on the final showdown performances and who really wanted to stay.
- Keating: Adira–Belle – was not sure if they would survive the next week.

Notes

- On 31 August 2013, the performances of three finalists entered the ARIA Singles Chart. Dami Im's performance of "One" debuted at number 52, Jai Waetford's performance of "Fix You" debuted at number 55 and Taylor Henderson's performance of "I Won't Let You Go" debuted at number 84. The following week, "One" peaked at number 42.

==== Week 2 (1/2 September) ====
- Theme: Legends
- Group performance: "Thank You" and "Classic" with MKTO
- Celebrity performers: Ricki-Lee ("Come & Get in Trouble with Me") and John Newman ("Love Me Again")

Acts' performances on the second live show
Act	Category (mentor)	Order	Song	Legend	Result
JTR	Groups (Bassingthwaighte)	1	"Can't Get You Out of My Head"	Kylie Minogue	Safe
Joelle Hadjia	Girls (Redfoo)	2	"Rude Boy"	Rihanna	Bottom Two
Cat Vas	Over 24s (Minogue)	3	"Can't Take My Eyes Off You"	Frankie Valli	Bottom Two
Omar Dean	Boys (Keating)	4	"Roxanne"	The Police	Safe
Jiordan Tolli	Girls (Redfoo)	5	"Thriller"	Michael Jackson	Safe
Jai Waetford	Boys (Keating)	6	"I Want to Hold Your Hand"	The Beatles	Safe
Barry Southgate	Over 24s (Minogue)	7	"Freedom! '90"	George Michael	Safe
Taylor Henderson	Boys (Keating)	8	"Run to You"	Bryan Adams	Safe
Ellie Lovegrove	Girls (Redfoo)	9	"(I Can't Get No) Satisfaction"	The Rolling Stones	Safe
Third Degree	Groups (Bassingthwaighte)	10	"Till the World Ends"	Britney Spears	Safe
Dami Im	Over 24s (Minogue)	11	"Purple Rain"	Prince	Safe
Final showdown details
Act	Category (mentor)	Order	Song		Result
Cat Vas	Over 24s (Minogue)	1	"High and Dry"		Eliminated
Joelle Hadjia	Girls (Redfoo)	2	"Give Me Love"		Safe

Judges' vote to eliminate

- Keating: Cat Vas – stated that he was rooting for Joelle.
- Minogue: Joelle – backed her own act, Cat Vas.
- Redfoo: Cat Vas – backed his own act, Joelle.
- Bassingthwaighte: Cat Vas – felt Joelle had more to give.

Notes

- On 7 September 2013, the performances of two finalists entered the ARIA Singles Chart. Dami Im's performance of "Purple Rain" debuted at number 29 and Jiordan Tolli's performance of "Thriller" debuted at number 63.

==== Week 3 (8/9 September) ====
- Theme: Top 10 Hits
- Group performance: "Can You Feel It"
- Celebrity performers:
  - Sunday – Redfoo ("Let's Get Ridiculous")
  - Monday – The Collective ("Another Life") and Miguel ("Adorn")

Acts' performances on the third live show
Act	Category (mentor)	Order	Song	Result
Third Degree	Groups (Bassingthwaighte)	1	"Wild"	Safe
Jai Waetford	Boys (Keating)	2	"The Way You Make Me Feel"	Safe
Barry Southgate	Over 24s (Minogue)	3	"California Gurls"	Bottom Two
Ellie Lovegrove	Girls (Redfoo)	4	"I'm Like a Bird"	Safe
Omar Dean	Boys (Keating)	5	"Cry Me a River"	Safe
JTR	Groups (Bassingthwaighte)	6	"Everybody Talks"	Bottom Two
Joelle	Girls (Redfoo)	7	"Locked Out of Heaven"	Safe
Taylor Henderson	Boys (Keating)	8	"I Will Wait"	Safe
Dami Im	Over 24s (Minogue)	9	"Don't Leave Me This Way"	Safe
Jiordan Tolli	Girls (Redfoo)	10	"With or Without You"	Safe
Final showdown details
Act	Category (mentor)	Order	Song	Result
JTR	Groups (Bassingthwaighte)	1	"The Man Who Can't Be Moved"	Safe
Barry Southgate	Over 24s (Minogue)	2	"Mirrors"	Eliminated

Judges' vote to eliminate

- Bassingthwaighte: Barry Southgate – backed her own act, JTR.
- Redfoo: Barry Southgate – felt Southgate was missing strong vocal performances.
- Minogue: JTR – backed her own act, Barry Southgate.
- Keating: Barry Southgate – went with his gut.

Notes

- On 14 September 2013, the performances of three finalists entered the ARIA Singles Chart. Taylor Henderson's performance of "I Will Wait" debuted at number 64, Dami Im's performance of "Don't Leave Me This Way" debuted at number 67 and Jai Waetford's performance of "The Way You Make Me Feel" debuted at number 97.

==== Week 4 (15/16 September) ====
- Theme: Latest and Greatest
- Group performance: "Pompeii"
- Celebrity performers: Rudimental ("Right Here" / "Feel the Love") and Kodaline ("High Hopes")

Acts' performances on the fourth live show
Act	Category (mentor)	Order	Song	Result
Ellie Lovegrove	Girls (Bassinthwghte)	1	"Wings"	Bottom Two
JTR	Groups (Minogue)	2	"Want U Back"	Bottom Two
Taylor Henderson	Boys (Redfoo)	3	"Let Her Go"	Safe
Joelle	Girls (Bassinthwighte)	4	"True Love"	Safe
Jai Waetford	Boys (Keating)	5	"It Will Rain"	Safe
Jiordan Tolli	Girls (Redfoo)	6	"Burn"	Safe
Third Degree	Groups (Bassingthwaighte)	7	"Love the Way You Lie"	Safe
Omar Dean	Boys (Keating)	8	"Skyscraper"	Safe
Dami Im	Over 24s (Minogue)	9	"Roar"	Safe
Final showdown details
Act	Category (mentor)	Order	Song	Result
Ellie Lovegrove	Girls (Redfoo)	1	"I Got You (I Feel Good)"	Eliminated
JTR	Groups (Bassingthwaighte)	2	"Waiting on the World to Change"	Safe

Judges' vote to eliminate

- Redfoo: JTR – backed his own act, Ellie Lovegrove.
- Minogue: Ellie Lovegrove – stated that JTR has improved more.
- Bassingthwaighte: Ellie Lovegrove – backed her own act, JTR.
- Keating: JTR – could not decide and sent the result to deadlock.

With the acts in the bottom two receiving two votes each, the result went to deadlock and reverted to the earlier public vote. Ellie Lovegrove was eliminated as the act with the fewest public votes.

Notes

- On 21 September 2013, the performances of two finalists entered the ARIA Singles Chart. Dami Im's performance of "Roar" debuted at number 44 and Taylor Henderson's performance of "Let Her Go" debuted at number 85.

==== Week 5 (22/24 September) ====
- Theme: Rock
- Group performance: "Love Will Save the Day" and "Picture of You" with Boyzone
- Celebrity performers: Capital Cities ("Safe and Sound") and Karmin ("Acapella")

Acts' performances on the fifth live show
Act	Category (mentor)	Order	Song	Rock Artist	Result
Dami Im	Over 24s (Minogue)	1	"Best of You"	Foo Fighters	Safe
Third Degree	Groups Bassignthwaighte)	2	"By the Way"	Red Hot Chili Peppers	Safe
Joelle	Girls (Redfoo)	3	"Joey"	Concrete Blonde	Bottom Two
Omar Dean	Boys (Keating)	4	"Any Way You Want It"	Journey	Safe
Jiordan Tolli	Girls (Redfoo)	5	"Dancing with Myself"	Billy Idol	Bottom Two
Jai Waetford	Boys (Keating)	6	"Drops of Jupiter (Tell Me)"	Train	Safe
JTR	Groups (Bassingthwaighte)	7	"Thnks fr th Mmrs"	Fall Out Boy	Safe
Taylor Henderson	Boys (Keating)	8	"Choirgirl"	Cold Chisel	Safe
Final showdown details
Act	Category (mentor)	Order	Song		Result
Joelle	Girls (Redfoo)	1	"A Thousand Miles"		Eliminated
Jiordan Tolli	Girls (Redfoo)	2	"Torn"		Safe

Judges' vote to eliminate

- Keating: Joelle – went with his gut.
- Bassingthwaighte: Joelle – felt that Tolli had a better run vocally throughout the live shows.
- Minogue: Joelle – stated that Tolli had developed more.
- Redfoo was not required to vote as there was already a majority, he did not say how he would have voted as both acts were in his category.

Notes

- This week's results show aired on Tuesday night due to the Seven Network's coverage of the 2013 Brownlow Medal.
- On 28 September 2013, the performances of three finalists entered the ARIA Singles Chart. Joelle's performance of "Joey" debuted at number 33, Taylor Henderson's performance of "Choirgirl" debuted at number 51 and Dami Im's performance of "Best of You" debuted at number 78.

==== Week 6 (29/30 September) ====
- Theme: Family Heroes
- Group performance: "Counting Stars"
- Celebrity performers: Jessica Mauboy ("Pop a Bottle (Fill Me Up)") and Jason Derulo ("Talk Dirty")

Acts' performances on the sixth live show
Act	Category (mentor)	Order	Song	Result
Third Degree	Groups (Bassingthwaighte)	1	"Smooth Criminal"	Bottom Two
Jai Waetford	Boys (Keating)	2	"That Should Be Me"	Safe
JTR	Groups (Bassingthwaighte)	3	"MMMBop"	Bottom Two
Omar Dean	Boys (Keating)	4	"Careless Whisper"	Safe
Taylor Henderson	Boys (Keating)	5	"The Horses"	Safe
Jiordan Tolli	Girls (Redfoo)	6	"Don't Speak"	Safe
Dami Im	Over 24s (Minogue)	7	"Bridge over Troubled Water"	Safe
Final showdown details
Act	Category (mentor)	Order	Song	Result
JTR	Groups (Bassingthwaighte)	1	"Lego House"	Eliminated
Third Degree	Groups (Bassingthwaighte)	2	"Dedication to My Ex (Miss That)"	Safe

Judges' vote to eliminate

- Keating: JTR – felt JTR had struggled in recent weeks.
- Minogue: JTR – because it was JTR's third time in the bottom two.
- Redfoo: JTR – went with his gut.
- Bassingthwaighte was not required to vote as there was already a majority and did not say how she would have voted as both acts were in her category.

Notes

- On 5 October 2013, the performances of three finalists entered the ARIA Singles Chart. Dami Im's performance of "Bridge over Troubled Water" debuted at number 15, Taylor Henderson's performance of "The Horses" debuted at number 27 and Jai Waetford's performance of "That Should Be Me" debuted at number 83.
- This is the first week where Dami Im didn't receive a standing ovation from all 4 judges
- Based on the voting percentages, it was noted that Dami Im received more than 60% of the votes from the public

==== Week 7 (6/7 October) ====
- Theme: Judges' Challenge
- Group performance: "We Come Running"
- Celebrity performers: Nathaniel Willemse ("You") and James Blunt ("Bonfire Heart")

Acts' performances on the seventh live show
Act	Category (mentor)	Order	Song	Chosen by	Result
Taylor Henderson	Boys (Keating)	1	"Wake Me Up"	Dannii Minogue	Safe
Omar Dean	Boys (Keating)	2	"She Will Be Loved"	Redfoo	Bottom Two
Dami Im	Over 24s (Minogue)	3	"Clarity"	Ronan Keating	Safe
Jai Waetford	Boys (Keating)	4	"Somewhere Only We Know"	Natalie Bassingthwaighte	Safe
Jiordan Tolli	Girls (Redfoo)	5	"Royals"	Natalie Bassingthwaighte	Bottom Two
Third Degree	Groups (Bassingthwaighte)	6	"Pump It"	Redfoo	Safe
Final showdown details
Act	Category (mentor)	Order	Song		Result
Omar Dean	Boys (Keating)	1	"You Found Me"		Eliminated
Jiordan Tolli	Girls (Redfoo)	2	"Stay"		Safe

Judges' vote to eliminate

- Keating: Jiordan Tolli – backed his own act, Omar Dean.
- Redfoo: Omar Dean – backed his own act, Jiordan Tolli.
- Bassingthwaighte: Omar Dean – stated that Tolli has more to deliver.
- Minogue: Jiordan Tolli – could not decide and sent the result to deadlock.

With the acts in the bottom two receiving two votes each, the result went to deadlock and reverted to the earlier public vote. Omar Dean was eliminated as the act with the fewest public votes.

Notes

- Omar Dean's elimination ended a record streak of six consecutive weeks where all three acts from one category had been safe without ever landing in the bottom two.
- All six acts received standing ovations for their performances.
- On 12 October 2013, the performances of five finalists entered the ARIA Singles Chart. Taylor Henderson's performance of "Wake Me Up" debuted at number 49, Dami Im's performance of "Clarity" debuted at number 77, Jiordan Tolli's performance of "Royals" debuted at number 81, Third Degree's performance of "Pump It" debuted at number 84 and Jai Waetford's performance of "Somewhere Only We Know" debuted at number 95.

==== Week 8: Quarter-Final (13/14 October) ====
- Theme: Aussie Week
- Group performance: "Impossible"
- Celebrity performers: Havana Brown ("Warrior") and James Arthur ("You're Nobody 'til Somebody Loves You")

Acts' performances in the quarter-final
Act	Category (mentor)	Order	Song	Australian Artist	Result
Dami Im	Over 24s (Minogue)	1	"You're the Voice"	John Farnham	Safe
Jiordan Tolli	Girls (Redfoo)	2	"Somebody That I Used to Know"	Gotye	Bottom Two
Jai Waetford	Boys (Keating)	3	"Plans"	Birds of Tokyo	Safe
Third Degree	Groups (Bassingthwaighte)	4	"Battle Scars"	Guy Sebastian	Bottom Two
Taylor Henderson	Boys (Keating)	5	"One Crowded Hour"	Augie March	Safe
Final showdown details
Act	Category (mentor)	Order	Song		Result
Jiordan Tolli	Girls (Redfoo)	1	"Young and Beautiful"		Eliminated
Third Degree	Groups (Bassingthwaighte)	2	"Thrift Shop"		Safe

Judges' vote to eliminate

- Redfoo: Third Degree – backed his own act, Jiordan Tolli.
- Minogue: Jiordan Tolli – because it was Tolli's third time in the bottom two.
- Bassingthwaighte: Jiordan Tolli – backed her own act, Third Degree.
- Keating: Third Degree – could not decide and sent the result to deadlock.

With the acts in the bottom two receiving two votes each, the result went to deadlock and reverted to the earlier public vote. Jiordan Tolli was eliminated as the act with the fewest public votes.

Notes

- With Jiordan Tolli eliminated, Redfoo had no more remaining acts to mentor.
- On 19 October 2013, Taylor Henderson's performance of "One Crowded Hour" debuted at number 38 on the ARIA Singles Chart.

==== Week 9: Semi-Final (20/21 October) ====
- Theme: Power and Passion
- Mentor: Tina Arena
- Celebrity performers: Imagine Dragons ("On Top of the World"), Tina Arena ("You Set Fire to My Life"), and Little Mix ("Move")

Acts' performances in the semi-final
Act	Category (mentor)	Order	First song	Order	Second song	Result
Third Degree	Groups (Bassingthwaighte)	1	"Give Me Everything"	6	"Pound the Alarm"	Bottom Two
Dami Im	Over 24s (Minogue)	2	"Saving All My Love for You"	8	"Wrecking Ball"	Safe
Jai Waetford	Boys (Keating)	3	"I Won't Give Up"	5	"Dynamite"	Safe
Taylor Henderson	Boys (Keating)	4	"Against All Odds"	7	"Girls Just Want to Have Fun"	Bottom Two
Final showdown details
Act	Category (mentor)	Order	Song			Result
Taylor Henderson	Boys (Keating)	1	"Stand by Me"			Safe
Third Degree	Groups (Bassingthwaighte)	2	"Crazy in Love"			Eliminated

Judges' vote to send through to the Grand Final

- Keating: Taylor Henderson – backed his own act, Taylor Henderson.
- Bassingthwaighte: Third Degree – backed her own act, Third Degree.
- Minogue: Third Degree – stated that a BAND could sell more records.
- Redfoo: Taylor Henderson – went with his gut.

With the acts in the bottom two receiving two votes each, the result went to deadlock and reverted to the earlier public vote. Taylor Henderson advanced to the final as the act with the most public votes.

Notes

- With Third Degree eliminated, Bassingthwaighte had no more remaining acts to mentor.
- On 26 October 2013, the performances of the four finalists entered the ARIA Singles Chart. Taylor Henderson's performance of "Girls Just Want to Have Fun" debuted at number two, Dami Im's performances of "Wrecking Ball" and "Saving All My Love for You" debuted at numbers 61 and 85 respectively, Jai Waetford's performance of "Dynamite" debuted at number 89, Henderson's performance of "Against All Odds" debuted at number 90 and Third Degree's performance of "Pound the Alarm" debuted at number 96.
- This is the first week where Dami Im lost her 1st place spot to Jai Waetford in the public voting but still made it to the Grand Final

==== Week 10: Final (27/28 October) ====
27 October

- Group performance: "LaserLight" (performed by top three finalists)
- Celebrity performers: One Direction ("Best Song Ever")

Acts' performances on the Sunday Final
Act	Category (mentor)	Order	Audition song	Order	Last shot song	Order	Winner's single	Result
Taylor Henderson	Boys (Keating)	1	"Some Nights"	8	"The Blower's Daughter"	4	"Borrow My Heart"	Safe
Jai Waetford	Boys (Keating)	7	"Don't Let Me Go"	5	"The Only Exception"	2	"Your Eyes"	Eliminated
Dami Im	Over 24s (Minogue)	3	"Hero"	9	"And I Am Telling You I'm Not Going"	6	"Alive"	Safe

Jai Waetford received the fewest public votes and was automatically eliminated.

28 October

- Group performances:
  - "Blow" (performed by top twelve finalists)
  - "Alone Together" with Fall Out Boy (performed by top three finalists)
- Celebrity performers: Guy Sebastian ("Like a Drum") and Katy Perry ("Roar" and "Unconditionally")

Acts' performances on the Monday Final
Act	Category (mentor)	Order	Best song from the Live Shows	Result
Taylor Henderson	Boys (Keating)	1	"Wake Me Up"	Runner-Up
Dami Im	Over 24s (Minogue)	2	"Purple Rain"	Winner

Notes

- For the first time this season there was no theme.
- On 2 November 2013, performances from the top three finalists entered the ARIA Singles Chart. Jai Waetford's performance of "Don't Let Me Go" debuted at number 37, Taylor Henderson's performances of "The Blower's Daughter" and "Some Nights" debuted at numbers 43 and 45 respectively, and Dami Im's performances of "And I Am Telling You I'm Not Going" and "Hero" debuted at numbers 29 and 62 respectively.
- Based on the voting percentages, Dami Im won with 56.2% of votes compared to 29.56% of Taylor Henderson. (Jai Waetford carry over freeze votes: 14.24%)

== Ratings ==
Colour key:
– Highest rating during the season
– Lowest rating during the season

Episode		Original airdate	Timeslot	Viewers (millions)	Nightly rank	Ref.
1	"Auditions"	29 July 2013	Monday 7:34 pm–9:11 pm	1.633	#1	
2	"Auditions"	30 July 2013	Tuesday 7:33 pm–8:51 pm	1.510	#1	
3	"Auditions"	31 July 2013	Wednesday 7:34 pm–8:46 pm	1.490	#1	
4	"Auditions"	4 August 2013	Sunday 6:32 pm–7:44 pm	1.552	#1	
5	"Auditions"	5 August 2013	Monday 7:34 pm–8:42 pm	1.379	#1	
6	"Auditions"	6 August 2013	Tuesday 7:32 pm–8:40 pm	1.480	#1	
7	"Super Bootcamp"	11 August 2013	Sunday 6:31 pm–8:09 pm	1.314	#3	
8	"Super Bootcamp"	12 August 2013	Monday 7:31 pm–8:48 pm	1.422	#1	
9	"Super Bootcamp"	13 August 2013	Tuesday 7:33 pm–8:50 pm	1.554	#1	
10	"Home Visits"	18 August 2013	Sunday 6:33 pm–8:19 pm	1.382	#2	
11	"Home Visits"	19 August 2013	Monday 7:32 pm–9:02 pm	1.495	#1	
12	"Home Visits"	20 August 2013	Tuesday 7:31 pm–9:01 pm	1.416	#1	
13	"Live show 1"	25 August 2013	Sunday 6:32 pm–8:54 pm	1.522	#1	
14	"Live decider 1"	26 August 2013	Monday 7:31 pm–8:42 pm	1.428	#1	
15	"Live show 2"	1 September 2013	Sunday 6:30 pm–8:52 pm	1.360	#1	
16	"Live decider 2"	2 September 2013	Monday 7:32 pm–8:47 pm	1.393	#1	
17	"Live show 3"	8 September 2013	Sunday 6:32 pm–9:02 pm	1.556	#2	
18	"Live decider 3"	9 September 2013	Monday 7:32 pm–8:45 pm	1.317	#2	
19	"Live show 4"	15 September 2013	Sunday 6:32 pm–8:33 pm	1.440	#2	
20	"Live decider 4"	16 September 2013	Monday 7:33 pm–8:47 pm	1.400	#2	
21	"Live show 5"	22 September 2013	Sunday 6:32 pm–8:20 pm	1.474	#1	
22	"Live decider 5"	24 September 2013	Tuesday 7:31 pm–8:48 pm	1.343	#1	
23	"Live show 6"	29 September 2013	Sunday 6:32 pm–8:18 pm	1.543	#1	
24	"Live decider 6"	30 September 2013	Monday 7:31 pm–8:46 pm	1.525	#2	
25	"Live show 7"	6 October 2013	Sunday 6:32 pm–7:42 pm	1.246	#2	
26	"Live decider 7"	7 October 2013	Monday 7:32 pm–8:47 pm	1.457	#1	
27	"Live show 8"	13 October 2013	Sunday 6:32 pm–7:50 pm	1.811	#1	
28	"Live decider 8"	14 October 2013	Monday 7:31 pm–8:44 pm	1.637	#1	
29	"Live show 9"	20 October 2013	Sunday 6:32 pm–8:17 pm	1.763	#1	
30	"Live decider 9"	21 October 2013	Monday 7:31 pm–8:54 pm	1.673	#1	
31	"Live Grand Final show"	27 October 2013	Sunday 6:32 pm–8:58 pm	2.020	#1	
32	"Live Grand Final decider"	28 October 2013	Monday 7:32 pm–10:00 pm	2.251	#2	
32	"Winner announced"	28 October 2013	Monday 7:32 pm–10:00 pm	2.431	#1	

== See also ==
- Television in Australia
