= Light Up the Dark (song) =

Single by Taylor Henderson
- Released: 9 September 2016
- Genre: Pop
- Length: 3:59
- Label: Sony
- Songwriter: Taylor Henderson
- Producer: Jon Hume

Taylor Henderson singles chronology
"Brighter Days" (2014)	"Light Up the Dark" (2016)	"Love Somebody" (2018)

Music video
- "Light Up the Dark" on YouTube

"Light Up the Dark" is a song recorded by Australian singer and songwriter Taylor Henderson for his forthcoming third studio album. The song is featured in the trailer for the Australian film Spin Out, in which Henderson also has a cameo appearance in performing the track.

The song was released in Australian on 9 September 2016 and the music video on 15 September. The single peaked at number 82 on the ARIA Chart for the week commencing 26 September 2016.

Henderson told Student Edge HQ he was asked to write an up-tempo and lively song for the movie by the producers. Henderson said "Light Up the Dark" about living in the moment. Henderson performed the song at the Sydney premier of Spin Out on 14 September 2016.

Henderson said "I think this is probably the most excited I have been in a long time, "Light Up the Dark" gives you a sneak peek into what the album is going to sound like and it's so awesome that it was a part of such a cool Aussie film!"

== Track listing ==
- Digital download / CD single
1. "Light Up the Dark" – 3:59

== Charts ==
Chart (2016)	Peak position
Australia (ARIA)	82
Australian artist (ARIA)	12

== Release history ==
Country	Date	Format	Label	Catalogue
Australia	9 September 2016	Digital download	Sony Music Australia	
Australia	16 September 2016	CD single	Sony Music Australia	88985379572
