= The Stables Recording Studio =

Recording studio in Australia

The Stables Music
- Industry: Music Production
- Founder: Jon Hume
- Headquarters: Victoria, Australia
- Website: www.thestablesmusic.com

The Stables Recording Studio was the original name of the recording studio now known as Red Moon Studios, located in Australia's Macedon Ranges. It was originally owned by Evermore front man Jon Hume and was designed and built for the recording of Evermore's albums but has since been used by many other artists.

Artists such as Lisa Mitchell, Amy Meredith, Alpine, Karise Eden, Clubfeet, Shannon Noll, Celia Pavey, Matt Corby, Lakyn Heperi, Adam Martin, Snakadaktal, Tina Arena, Delta Goodrem, Little Sea, Kaity Dunstan & Sticky Fingers have also written and recorded there.

In 2017, the studio was sold to Australian producer/composer Jan Skubiszewski and his wife, who re-branded it Red Moon Studios.
