= Borrow My Heart =

Single by Taylor Henderson

from the album Taylor Henderson
- Released: 1 November 2013
- Recorded: 2013
- Genre: Pop; folk
- Length: 3:32
- Label: Sony
- Songwriters: Alex Hope; Hayley Warner; Louis Schoorl
- Producer: Louis Schoorl

Taylor Henderson singles chronology
"Borrow My Heart" (2013)	"I Am Australian" (2014)

"Borrow My Heart" is the debut single by season five runner-up of The X Factor Australia, Taylor Henderson. It was released digitally by Sony Music Australia on 1 November 2013, as the lead single from his self-titled debut album. "Borrow My Heart" debuted at number one on the ARIA Singles Chart and was certified two times platinum by the Australian Recording Industry Association for selling over 140,000 copies.

== Background and release ==
"Borrow My Heart" was written by Louis Schoorl, Hayley Warner and Alex Hope, and produced by Schoorl. It would have been Henderson's winner's single for the fifth season of The X Factor, if he had won the show. However, Henderson finished in second place. On 1 November 2013, it was announced that Henderson signed a recording contract with Sony Music Australia, and "Borrow My Heart" was released digitally as his debut single later that day. A CD single was released on 8 November 2013.

== Chart performance ==
"Borrow My Heart" debuted at number one on the ARIA Singles Chart on 11 November 2013. It was certified two times platinum by the Australian Recording Industry Association for selling over 140,000 copies.

== Live performances ==
Henderson performed "Borrow My Heart" live for the first time during The X Factor grand final performance show on 27 October 2013.

== Track listing ==
- CD / digital download
1. "Borrow My Heart" – 3:32

== Personnel ==
- Vocals – Taylor Henderson
- Songwriting – Alex Hope, Hayley Warner, Louis Schoorl
- Production – Louis Schoorl
- Mixing engineer – Louis Schoorl

== Charts ==
=== Weekly charts ===
Chart (2013)	Peak position
Australia (ARIA)	1

=== Year-end charts ===
Chart (2013)	Rank
ARIA Singles Chart	73
Australian Artist Singles Chart	9

Chart (2014)	Rank
Australian Artist Singles Chart	40

== Certification ==
Region	Certification	Certified units/sales
Australia (ARIA)	2× Platinum	140,000^{^}
^{^} Shipments figures based on certification alone.

== Release history ==
Country	Date	Format	Label	Catalogue
Australia	1 November 2013	Digital download	Sony Music Australia	
Australia	8 November 2013	CD	Sony Music Australia	88843013122

== See also ==
- List of number-one singles of 2013 (Australia)
