= Louis Schoorl =

Australian songwriter and music producer

- Born: Louis Schoorl; 23 December 1976 (age 49); The Netherlands
- Origin: Sydney, New South Wales, Australia
- Occupations: Songwriter, producer, composer, multi-instrumentalist
- Label: Disney Music Publishing
- Website: www.louisschoorl.com

Louis Schoorl (born 23 December 1976) is a Dutch-born Australian songwriter, composer, producer and multi-instrumentalist.

== Career ==
Based in Sydney, Australia, Schoorl has written or produced for 5 Seconds of Summer, Taylor Henderson, Jessica Mauboy, Girls' Generation, Stan Walker, The Fooo, Dami Im, Guy Sebastian, 360, Pez and M-Phazes. He's worked alongside singer-songwriters including Daniel Johns, Tina Arena, De La Soul, Delta Goodrem, The Veronicas, Kimbra, Bertie Blackman, Benjamin Francis Leftwich, Georgie Kay and Mike Rosenberg aka Passenger.

Schoorl songs have topped the Swedish, Japanese and Australian Charts including runner-up of The X Factor Australia, Taylor Henderson's "Borrow My Heart".

On a trip to Stockholm Louis wrote a song with Erik Lewander and Ylva Dimberg of The Kennel that was released by Girls' Generation on their Japanese album Love and Peace. The track "My Oh My" has notched up more than 20 million YouTube views. Girls' Generation have set a new record by becoming the first Korean girl group to top the Oricon Weekly Album Chart twice with their 3rd Japanese full-length album Love & Peace.

Schoorl won Breakthrough Songwriter of the Year at the 2014 APRA Awards held in Brisbane in recognition of a hot stretch in 2013 during which he wrote, co-wrote and produced 88 songs, collaborating with such acts as 360, Daniel Johns, Taylor Henderson and Jessica Mauboy. Schoorl is signed to a worldwide publishing deal with Disney Music Publishing.

Schoorl co-wrote the original song "Gotcha" for the Australian film The Sapphires with Ilan Kidron and the film's star, Jessica Mauboy. The film's soundtrack was nominated for an ARIA Music Award for the Best Original Soundtrack and Best Pop Release. Jessica Mauboy also received an ARIA Nomination for Best Female Artist for "Gotcha".

In 2018 he co-wrote the Swedish entry for that year's Eurovision Song Contest, Dance You Off, performed by Benjamin Ingrosso.

== Awards and nominations ==
=== APRA Awards ===
The APRA Awards are held in Australia and New Zealand by the Australasian Performing Right Association to recognise songwriting skills, sales and airplay performance by its members annually.

Year	Nominee / work	Award	Result	Ref.
2014	Louis Schoorl	Breakthrough Songwriter of the Year	Won	

=== ARIA Music Awards ===
The ARIA Music Awards is an annual ceremony presented by Australian Recording Industry Association (ARIA), which recognise excellence, innovation, and achievement across all genres of the music of Australia. They commenced in 1987.

Year	Nominee / work	Award	Result	Ref.
2020	DNA & Louis Schoorl for Hilda by Jessica Mauboy	Producer of the Year	Nominated	

=== Vanda & Young Global Songwriting Competition ===
The Vanda & Young Global Songwriting Competition is an annual competition that "acknowledges great songwriting whilst supporting and raising money for Nordoff-Robbins" and is coordinated by Albert Music and APRA AMCOS. It commenced in 2009.

Year	Nominee / work	Award	Result	Ref.
2024	"12 Minute Walk" (performed by Bow Anderson)	Vanda & Young Global Songwriting Competition	2nd	
2025	"Zombie" (Performed by Lewis Fitzgerald)	Vanda & Young Global Songwriting Competition	3rd	
2025	"Somewhere That Love Grows" (Performed by Izzy Bizu)	Vanda & Young Global Songwriting Competition	Finalist	
