= Taylor Henderson =

Australian singer and songwriter (born 1993)

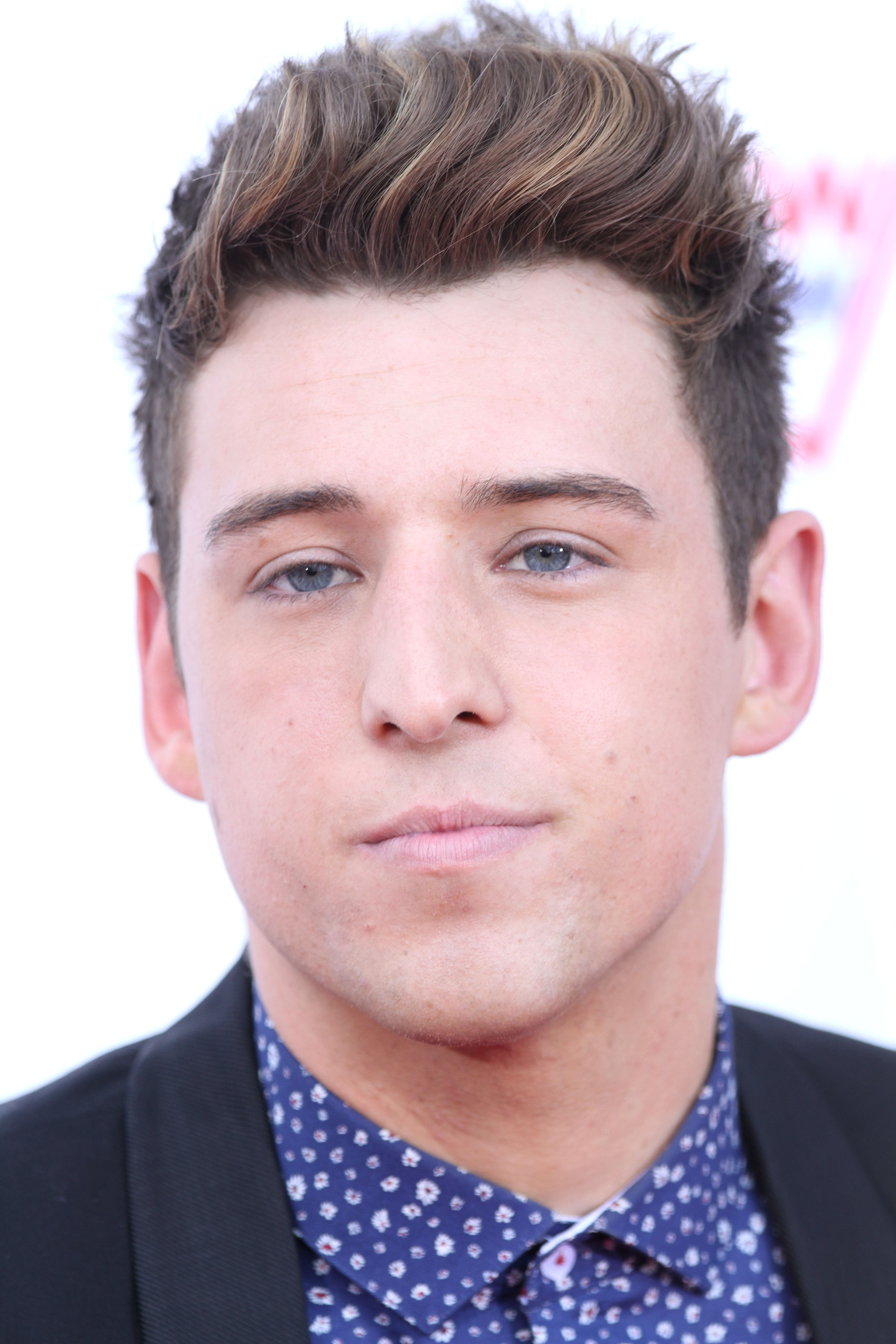
- Henderson at the 2014 ARIA Music Awards

Background information
- Born: Taylor James Henderson; 23 March 1993 (age 33); Ceres, Victoria, Australia
- Genres: Pop; folk; country
- Occupations: Singer; songwriter
- Instruments: Vocals; guitar
- Years active: 2010; 2013–present
- Label: Sony (2013–2017)
- Website: www.taylorhendersonofficial.com

Taylor James Henderson (born 23 March 1993) is an Australian singer and songwriter. Originating from Ceres, Victoria, Henderson rose to fame after placing third on the fourth series of Australia's Got Talent in 2010. Three years later, he became the runner-up on the fifth season of The X Factor Australia and subsequently received a recording contract with Sony Music Australia.

In November 2013, Henderson released his self-titled debut album, which debuted at number one on the ARIA Albums Chart and was certified platinum by the Australian Recording Industry Association. Additionally, the album included his number-one debut single "Borrow My Heart". The following year, Henderson released his second studio album Burnt Letters, which became his second number-one album and yielded the top-five hit "When You Were Mine".

== Early life ==
Taylor James Henderson is from Ceres, Victoria. He was born on 23 March 1993 with Marcus Gunn Jaw-winking Syndrome. Henderson has an older sister named Bridey and a younger sister named Gemma. Their parents Sonja and Cameron Henderson are divorced. Henderson was a member of the Geelong Revival Centre, but has since parted ways with the church. Henderson was a student at Kardinia International College in Bell Post Hill, Victoria and graduated in 2011. He worked as a labourer with his father.

== Career ==
=== 2010: Australia's Got Talent ===
In 2010, Henderson and his father Cam auditioned for the fourth series of Australia's Got Talent as a guitar and singing duo called Father & Son. After they sang Michael Jackson's "Man in the Mirror" during the audition, judge Brian McFadden suggested that the pair should be solo artists. Henderson then sang an original song, "My Baby Sister", which earned him three yeses from the judges. He and Cameron were put through to the semi-finals as soloists competing against each other. Henderson appeared in the fourth semi-final on 1 June 2010 and sang an original song, "What Goes Around Comes Around". Henderson made it to the grand final, where he sang "Man on the Side" by John Mayer. He finished in third place, while Cameron was runner-up to dance troupe Justice Crew.

=== 2013: The X Factor Australia ===
Henderson auditioned for the fifth season of The X Factor Australia in 2013. He sang "Some Nights" by Fun and progressed to the super bootcamp round of the competition. On the first day of bootcamp, Henderson was placed in the Boys category and sang "Ho Hey" by The Lumineers in front of his entire category and judges Redfoo, Ronan Keating and Dannii Minogue. On the second day of super bootcamp, he was put into an ensemble of 10 and they sang "Last Request" by Paolo Nutini in front of the judges. Henderson made it to the third day of bootcamp, where he sang "Human Nature" by Michael Jackson to the judges and a live audience of one thousand. He then progressed to the home visits round in Los Angeles and sang "Isn't She Lovely?" by Stevie Wonder in front of his mentor Keating and guest mentor Kelly Osbourne. Keating later selected Henderson, along with Omar Dean and Jai Waetford, for the live finals—a series of ten weekly live shows in which contestants are progressively eliminated by public vote.

For the Judges' Choice-themed first live show, Henderson sang "I Won't Let You Go" by James Morrison and received a mixed feedback from Keating, who noted that it was not his best performance of the song. Henderson's performance of "I Won't Let You Go" debuted at number 84 on the ARIA Singles Chart. For the Legends-themed second live show, he sang "Run to You" by Bryan Adams and played the electric guitar for the first time. Minogue thought the guitar playing was a bit absent at times and that Henderson's song choice did not work for him. For the Top 10 Hits-themed third live show, he sang "I Will Wait" by Mumford & Sons and received a positive feedback from the judges. Natalie Bassingthwaighte called Henderson's performance "insane" and thought the song choice was perfect for him. His performance of "I Will Wait" debuted at number 64 on the ARIA Singles Chart. Henderson received a standing ovation from the judges for his performance of Passenger's "Let Her Go" in the Latest and Greatest-themed fourth live show, and it debuted at number 85 on the ARIA Singles Chart.

For the Rock-themed fifth live show, Henderson sang "Choirgirl" by Cold Chisel and received another standing ovation. Redfoo said it was his best vocal performance on the live shows. Henderson's performance of "Choirgirl" debuted at number 51 on the ARIA Singles Chart. For the Family Heroes-themed sixth live show, he sang Daryl Braithwaite's "The Horses", and his performance debuted on the ARIA Singles Chart at number 27. Henderson received another standing ovation from the judges during the Judges' Challenge-themed seventh live show, for his performance of Avicii's "Wake Me Up", which was chosen by Minogue. The performance debuted at number 49 on the ARIA Singles Chart. For the Aussie Week-themed eighth live show, he sang "One Crowded Hour" by Augie March and received a standing ovation. Minogue applauded his growth in the competition and Bassingthwaighte said his "interpretation was beautiful". Henderson's performance of "One Crowded Hour" debuted at number 38 on the ARIA Singles Chart.

For the Power and Passion-themed ninth live show, he sang "Against All Odds" by Phil Collins and "Girls Just Want to Have Fun" by Cyndi Lauper. During the ninth live decider show the following day, Henderson was in the bottom two for the first time with Third Degree. After the judges' vote went to deadlock, it was announced that Henderson received the most public votes and was put through to the grand final. His performance of "Girls Just Want to Have Fun" debuted at number two on the ARIA Singles Chart and was certified gold by the Australian Recording Industry Association for selling over 35,000 copies. His performance of "Against All Odds" debuted at number 90. During the grand final performance show on 27 October, Henderson was required to perform three songs – his audition song "Some Nights", winner's single "Borrow My Heart", and last shot song "The Blower's Daughter" by Damien Rice. His performances of "The Blower's Daughter" and "Some Nights" debuted on the ARIA Singles Chart at numbers 43 and 45, respectively. During the grand final decider show the following day, it was announced that Henderson was runner-up to Dami Im.

denotes a performance that entered the ARIA Singles
denotes Runner-up
denotes have been in the Bottom two

==== Performances on The X Factor ====
Show	Song choice	Original Artist	Theme	Result
Auditions	"Some Nights"	Fun	—N/a	Through to Super bootcamp
Super bootcamp	"Ho Hey"	The Lumineers	—N/a	Through to second day of bootcamp
Super bootcamp	"Last Request"	Paolo Nutini	—N/a	Through to third day of bootcamp
Super bootcamp	"Human Nature"	Michael Jackson	—N/a	Through to home visits
Home visits	"Isn't She Lovely?"	Stevie Wonder	—N/a	Through to Live shows
Week 1	"I Won't Let You Go"	James Morrison	Judges' Choice	Safe
Week 2	"Run to You"	Bryan Adams	Legends	Safe
Week 3	"I Will Wait"	Mumford & Sons	Top 10 Hits	Safe
Week 4	"Let Her Go"	Passenger	Latest and Greatest	Safe
Week 5	"Choirgirl"	Cold Chisel	Rock	Safe
Week 6	"The Horses"	Daryl Braithwaite	Family Heroes	Safe
Week 7	"Wake Me Up"	Avicii	Judges' Challenge	Safe
Week 8	"One Crowded Hour"	Augie March	Aussie Week	Safe
Week 9	"Against All Odds"	Phil Collins	Power and Passion	Bottom two (3rd)
Week 9	"Girls Just Want to Have Fun"	Cyndi Lauper	Power and Passion	Bottom two (3rd)
Week 9	"Stand by Me"	Ben E. King	Save me song	Saved via deadlock
Week 10	"Some Nights"	Fun	Audition song	Runner-up
Week 10	"The Blower's Daughter"	Damien Rice	Last shot song	Runner-up
Week 10	"Borrow My Heart"	Henderson	Winner's single	Runner-up
Week 10	"Wake Me Up"	Avicii	Best moment of the live shows song	Runner-up

=== 2013–15: Taylor Henderson and Burnt Letters ===
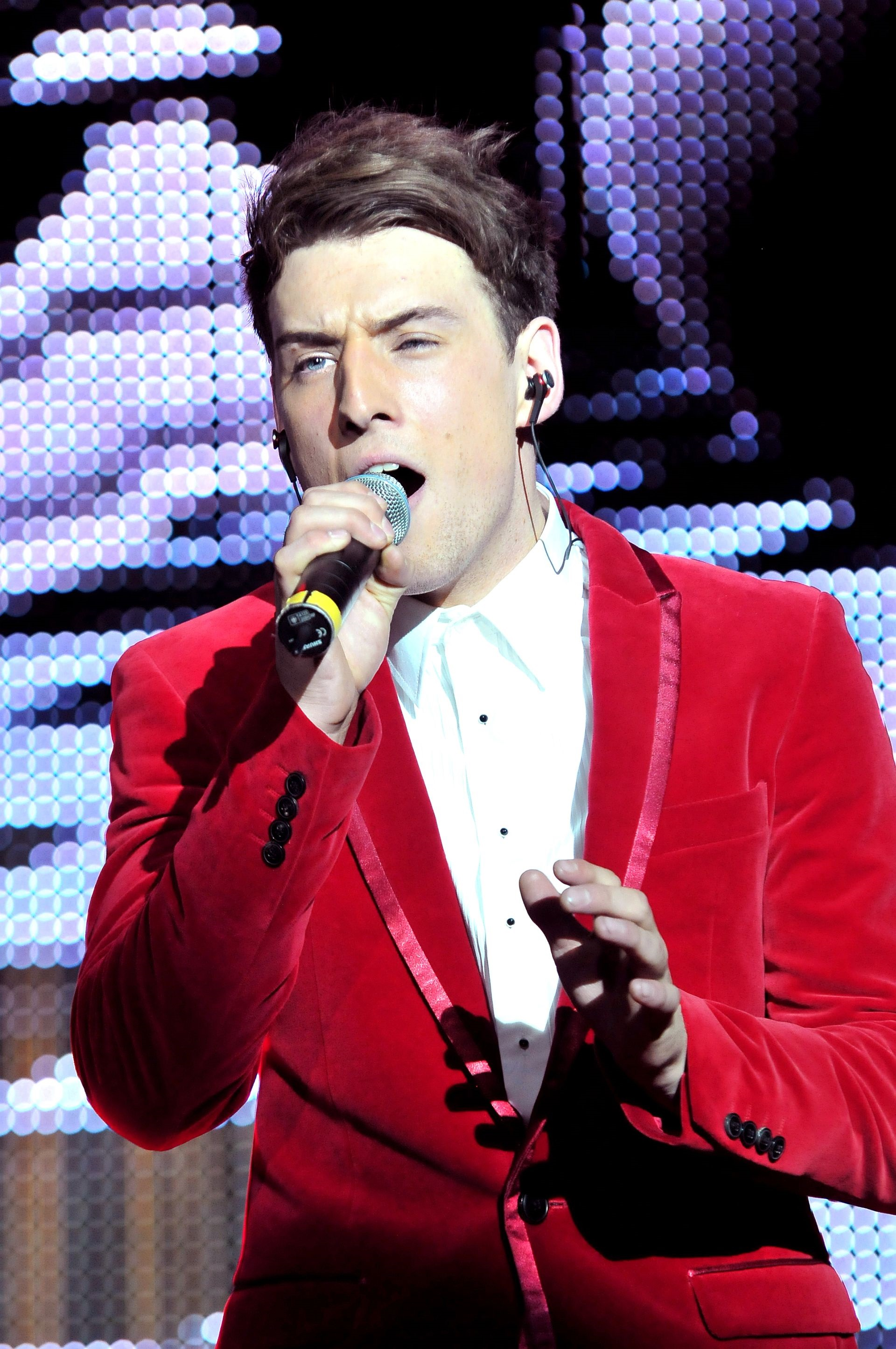
Henderson performing at The X Factor Live Tour in November 2013

Four days after The X Factor ended, on 1 November 2013, it was announced that Henderson had received a recording contract with Sony Music Australia. "Borrow My Heart" was released on the iTunes Store that same day as his debut single. The song debuted at number one on the ARIA Singles Chart and was certified double platinum for selling over 140,000 copies. On 23 November 2013, Henderson toured alongside Dami Im, Third Degree, Jiordan Tolli and Jai Waetford for The X Factor Live Tour, which ended on 2 December 2013. His self-titled debut album was released on 29 November 2013 and featured studio recordings of songs he performed on The X Factor. The album debuted at number one on the ARIA Albums Chart and was certified platinum for shipments of more than 70,000 units.

On 24 January 2014, Henderson released a cover of "I Am Australian" with Im, Jessica Mauboy, Justice Crew, Nathaniel Willemse and Samantha Jade, to coincide with the Australia Day celebrations. The song peaked at number 51 on the ARIA Singles Chart. Henderson embarked on The Dawn Tour in late March 2014, and was the supporting act for MKTO's Australian Thank You Tour in April 2014. On 4 July 2014, Henderson's first extended play, The Acoustic Sessions, was released exclusively on the JB Hi-Fi online store, featuring acoustic versions of six songs from his second studio album Burnt Letters.

Burnt Letters was released on 11 July 2014 and became Henderson's second consecutive album to debut at number one on the ARIA Albums Chart. It was certified gold for shipments of more than 35,000 units. The album was preceded by the release of its first two singles, "When You Were Mine" and "Already Gone". The former debuted at number five on the ARIA Singles Chart and was certified platinum, while the latter peaked at number 42. To promote the album, Henderson embarked on the Burnt Letters Tour from July to September 2014. On 14 October 2014, he was the supporting act for The Script's special one-off show at The Metro Theatre in Sydney.

=== 2016–present: One More Minute ===
In August 2016, Henderson announced the release of a new single titled "Light Up the Dark" which would be included on the soundtrack for the Australian film Spin Out. The track is the first from his upcoming third studio album One More Minute. Henderson also embarked on his Acoustic Tour in September and October 2016. Originally his new album was planned to be released on 4 November but on 28 October, Taylor posted a video on his Facebook and Instagram accounts letting his fans know that his album will be delayed to 10 March 2017. He then announced on 8 March 2017 that the album would be pushed back again to a date yet to be advised, although said a new single titled "Back To You" would be released soon. In late 2016, two songs leaked on Henderson's Apple Music Connect page. The songs were both titled "Yours Again", with one featuring a beat and the other without the beat. These tracks weren't discovered by fans until early 2017, several months after the original leaking.

On 10 June 2017, Henderson announced that he had signed with a new manager. On 11 May 2018, Henderson announced via Twitter he was officially an independent artist. On 21 September 2018, Henderson released "Love Somebody", his first single in two years.

On 31 July 2019, Henderson performed at Loyola College's annual celebratory St Ignatius Feast Day to promote his upcoming "Moving On" tour.

== Artistry ==
Aside from singing, Henderson also plays guitar and writes his songs. He believes that "playing an instrument leads to better songwriting, because you can experiment with different melodies and keys." Henderson played the guitar in most of the songs on his second album Burnt Letters (2014). Henderson cites Matt Corby, Michael Jackson, John Mayer, James Morrison, Jason Mraz, Ed Sheeran and Justin Timberlake as his musical influences. Of Sheeran, Henderson stated: "He has a real connection with the words he sings, and there's a real art to his storytelling." Henderson also cites his father Cameron as an influence because he taught him how to play the guitar.

== Discography ==
- Taylor Henderson (2013)
- Burnt Letters (2014)

== Concert tours ==
Headlining

- The X Factor Live Tour (2013)
- The Dawn Tour (2014)
- Burnt Letters Tour (2014)
- Acoustic Tour (2016)
- Love Somebody Tour (2018–2019)

Supporting

- MKTO's Australian Thank You Tour (2014)

== Awards and nominations ==
Year	Type	Recipient	Award	Result
2013	Poprepublic.tv Awards	Himself	Favourite Australian Male Artist	Nominated
2013	Poprepublic.tv Awards	Himself	Breakthrough Artist of 2013	Nominated
2013	Poprepublic.tv Awards	"Borrow My Heart"	Favourite Single of 2013	Nominated
2014	Nickelodeon Kids' Choice Awards	Himself	Aussies' Fave Hot New Talent	Nominated
2014	ARIA No. 1 Chart Awards	Taylor Henderson	Number One Album	Won
2014	ARIA No. 1 Chart Awards	"Borrow My Heart"	Number One Single	Won
2014	World Music Awards	"Borrow My Heart"	World's Best Song	Nominated
2014	World Music Awards	"Girls Just Want to Have Fun"	World's Best Song	Nominated
2014	Channel [V] Awards	Himself	[V] Oz Artist of the Year	Nominated
2014	ARIA Music Awards	"Borrow My Heart"	Song of the Year	Nominated
2015	APRA Music Awards	"Borrow My Heart"	Pop Work of the Year	Nominated
