= Dean Ray =

Australian singer and songwriter

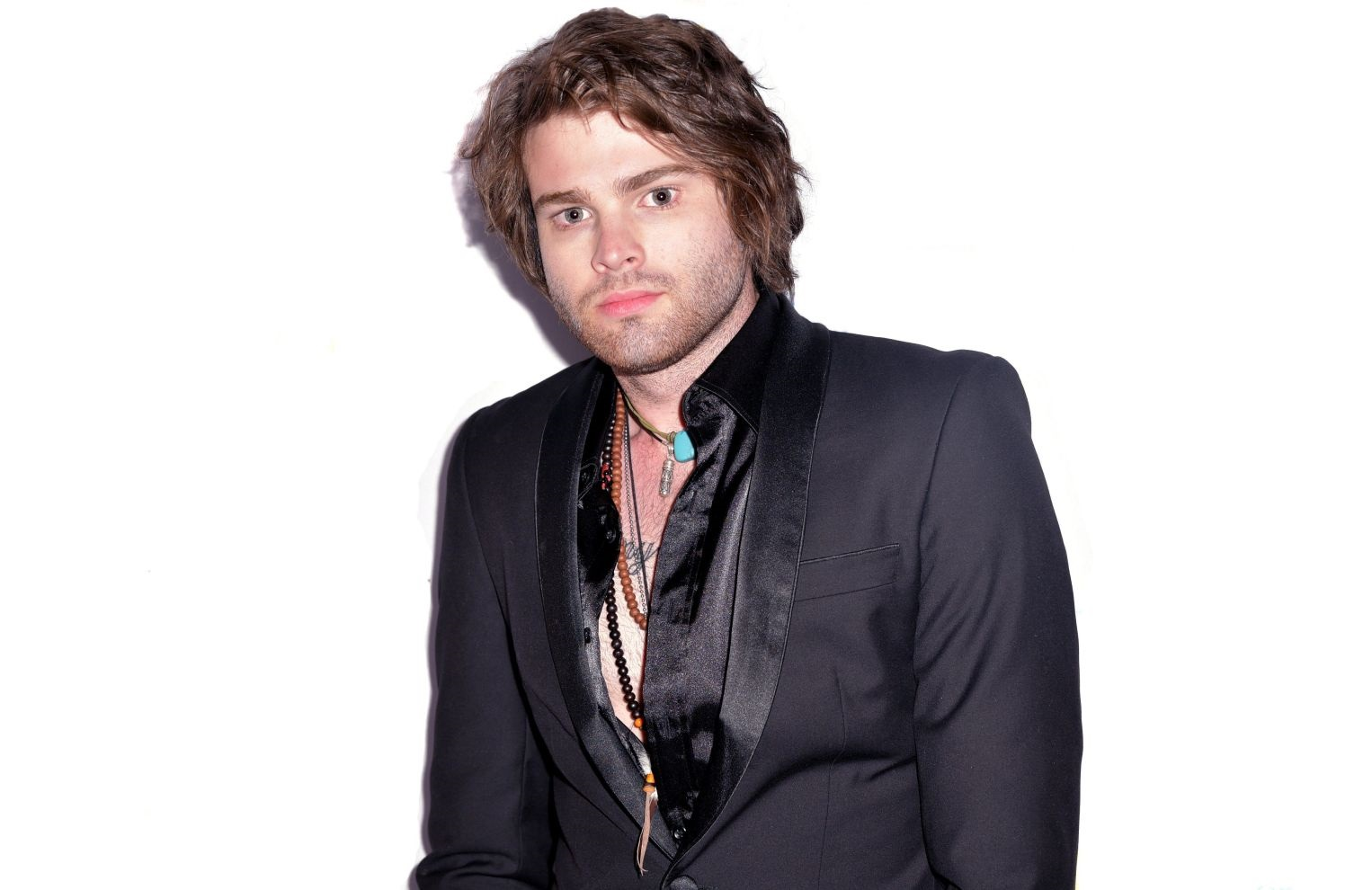
- Dean Ray at the Emeralds & Ivy Ball.

Background information
- Born: Dean Pritchard; Narromine, New South Wales
- Genre: Rock
- Occupations: Singer; songwriter
- Instruments: Vocals; guitar; drums
- Years active: 2014–present
- Label: Franklin Sound Art - Independent
- Website: www.deanraymusic.com

Dean Pritchard, better known by his stage name Dean Ray, is an Australian singer and songwriter. In 2014, he was the runner-up on the sixth season of The X Factor Australia. Ray subsequently received a recording contract with Sony Music Australia and released his debut single "Coming Back", which debuted at number one on the ITunes Singles Chart (with Platinum status) and number five on the ARIA Singles Chart. This was followed by the release of his self-titled debut album in November 2014, which debuted at number five on the ARIA Albums Chart and was certified gold by the Australian Recording Industry Association.

== Early life ==
Dean Ray (born Dean Pritchard) is originally from Narromine, New South Wales. At the age of six, Ray and his family moved to Meandarra, Queensland. Ray comes from a musical family; his parents Chris and Angie had their own country band called Itchy Feet. Ray grew up travelling around Australia with his parents, and he would often sleep in guitar cases backstage at venues when his parents were on stage performing. Ray learnt how to play the drums when he was nine years old. At the age of 13, he learnt how to play the guitar and started writing his own songs. Ray and his brother, who played piano, were then recruited into their parents' band.

Ray was a student at Chinchilla State High School in Chinchilla, Queensland. He left school at the age of 16 to pursue a music career. During this time, Ray also moved out of his family home and went travelling. He later moved to Kensington, Victoria and worked as a busker around the streets of Melbourne.

== Career ==
=== 2014: The X Factor Australia ===
In 2014, Ray successfully auditioned for the sixth season of The X Factor Australia, singing "Bette Davis Eyes" by Kim Carnes. He received four yeses from the judges and progressed to the super bootcamp round of the competition. For the first bootcamp challenge, Ray was placed into a group with three other contestants from the Boys category to perform a song together for the judges. Ray made it to the second bootcamp challenge, where he performed "Yellow" by Coldplay to the judges and a live audience of one thousand. He then progressed to the home visits round in New York City and performed "Dancing Queen" by ABBA in front of his mentor Natalie Bassingthwaighte and guest mentor Jennifer Lopez. Bassingthwaighte later selected Ray, along with Adrien Nookadu and Tee, for the live finals—a series of eleven weekly live shows in which contestants are progressively eliminated by public vote.

After the eliminations of Nookadu in week three and Tee in week seven, Ray became the last remaining contestant in Bassingthwaighte's category. In week nine, he was in the bottom two for the first time with Caitlyn Shadbolt and performed Johnny Cash's version of Nine Inch Nails' "Hurt" in the final showdown. Ray was saved after Bassingthwaighte, Dannii Minogue and Redfoo chose to eliminate Shadbolt. During the grand final decider show on 20 October 2014, it was announced that Ray was runner-up to Marlisa Punzalan.

==== Performances on The X Factor ====
| Show | Theme | Song(s) | Original artist(s) | Order | Result |
|---|---|---|---|---|---|
| Audition | Free choice | "Bette Davis Eyes" | Kim Carnes | N/A | Through to super bootcamp |
| Super bootcamp 1 | Group performance | "You're Nobody 'til Somebody Loves You" | James Arthur | N/A | Through to super bootcamp 2 |
| Super bootcamp 2 | Solo performance | "Yellow" | Coldplay | N/A | Through to home visits |
| Home visits | Free choice | "Dancing Queen" | ABBA | N/A | Through to live shows |
| Week 1 | Judges' Choice | "Sympathy for the Devil" | The Rolling Stones | 12 | Safe |
| Week 2 | Legends | "Janie's Got a Gun" | Aerosmith | 6 | Safe |
| Week 3 | Decades Challenge | "Reckless" | Australian Crawl | 8 | Safe |
| Week 4 | Top 10 Hits | "Mr. Brightside" | The Killers | 6 | Safe |
| Week 5 | Latest and Greatest | "Budapest" | George Ezra | 7 | Safe (2nd) |
| Week 6 | Rock | "New Sensation" | INXS | 1 | Safe |
| Week 7 | Judges' Challenge | "Stolen Dance" | Milky Chance | 6 | Safe |
| Week 8 | Aussie Week | "Into My Arms" | Nick Cave and the Bad Seeds | 6 | Safe |
| Week 9 | Killer Tracks and Curveballs | "Lonely Boy" | The Black Keys | 1 | Bottom two |
| Week 9 | Killer Tracks and Curveballs | "Crying" | Roy Orbison | 9 | Bottom two |
| Week 9 | Final showdown | "Hurt" | Nine Inch Nails | 2 | Saved |
| Week 10 (Semi-final) | Power and Passion | "The Power of Love" | Frankie Goes to Hollywood | 3 | Safe |
| Week 10 (Semi-final) | Power and Passion | "Folsom Prison Blues" / "That's All Right (Mama)" | Johnny Cash / Elvis Presley | 8 | Safe |
| Week 11 (Grand Final) | Audition song | "Bette Davis Eyes" | Kim Carnes | 9 | Safe |
| Week 11 (Grand Final) | Duet | "Dear Darlin'" (with Olly Murs) | Olly Murs | 6 | Safe |
| Week 11 (Grand Final) | Winner's single | "Coming Back" | Dean Ray | 3 | Safe |
| Week 11 (Grand Final) | Best Moment | "Budapest" | George Ezra | 2 | Runner-up |

=== 2014–2016: Dean Ray and Sony Music Australia ===
On 24 October 2014, it was announced that Ray had received a recording contract with Sony Music Australia. His debut single "Coming Back", which would have been his winner's single if he had won The X Factor, was released on the iTunes Store that same day. It debuted at number one on the ITunes Singles Chart (with Platinum status) and number five on the ARIA Singles Chart. Ray's self-titled debut album was released on 21 November 2014 and features studio recordings of selected songs he performed on The X Factor. It debuted at number five on the ARIA Albums Chart and number 21 on the New Zealand Albums Chart. The album was certified gold by the Australian Recording Industry Association for shipments of 35,000 copies. The album was the 75th best-selling album of 2014 in Australia. Ray was the supporting act for The Veronicas' Sanctified Tour in February 2015. On 17 March 2015, Ray released an acoustic cover of Jake Bugg's "Me and You" as his second single. His third single "I O U (A Heartache)" was released on 31 July 2015. In March 2016, it was speculated that Ray had been dropped by record company Sony Music, along with other X Factor finalists Reigan Derry, Marlisa Punzalan and Nathaniel Willemse.

=== 2017–present: The Messenger and 4 Trak Sessions – Volume 1 ===
In August 2017, Ray released "The Winnings", the lead single from his second studio album, The Messenger which was released in October 2017. His follow-up single "Call It a Day" was released shortly after. Rolling Stone. magazine said of The Messenger: "Ray delivers a set that's steeped in Australiana and affecting story-telling... The down-on-his-luck outlaw rocker motif isn't new, but Ray's talent turns it upside down with terrific verve."

In 2018, Ray then released the singles "Lady Powers", "Mystery", "Princess Annie" and "Scars".

In October 2018, the Dean Ray was part of the 100 judges on All Together Now.

In September 2020, Ray released his third studio album, 4 Trak Sessions – Volume 1.

== Artistry ==
Aside from singing, he also plays the guitar and drums and writes his own songs. Ray cites Airbourne, The Beatles, Bob Dylan, Elvis Presley, First Aid Kit, Joss Stone, Phil & Tommy Emmanuel, Son House and Stevie Ray Vaughan as his musical influences.

== Personal life ==
In October 2014, Ray confirmed that he was dating fellow Australian singer Bonnie Anderson. The pair ended their relationship two months later. On 31 July 2015, Ray's house in Melbourne was burgled and seven of his parents guitars were stolen. From 2015, Ray has stayed away from the public light and has kept his personal life private.

== Concert tours ==
Supporting

- The Veronicas' Sanctified Tour (2015)

== Discography ==
=== Studio albums ===
List of studio albums
| Title | Album details | Peak chart positions | | Certifications |
| Title | Album details | AUS | NZ | Certifications |
|---|---|---|---|---|
| Dean Ray | Released: 21 November 2014 (Australia); Label: Sony Music Australia; Formats: CD, digital download | 5 | 21 | ARIA: Gold |
| The Messenger | Released: 20 October 2017 (Australia); Label: Franklin Sound Art; Formats: CD, digital download | – | – | |
| 4 Trak Sessions – Volume 1 | Released: 4 September 2020; Label: Franklin Sound Art; Formats: CD, digital download | – (Note: 4 Trak Sessions – Volume 1 did not enter the ARIA Top 100 Chart, but peaked at number 13 on the 100% Australian Independent Record Labels Association chart.) | – | |

=== Singles ===
List of singles
| Title | Year | Peak chart positions | Album |
| Title | Year | AUS | Album |
|---|---|---|---|
| "Coming Back" | 2014 | 5 | Dean Ray |
| "Me and You" | 2015 | — | Non-album singles |
| "I O U (A Heartache)" | 2015 | — | Non-album singles |
| "The Winnings" | 2017 | — | The Messenger |
| "Call It a Day" | 2017 | — | The Messenger |
| "Lady Powers" | 2018 | — | Non-album singles |
| "Mystery" | 2018 | — | Non-album singles |
| "Princess Annie" | 2018 | — | Non-album singles |
| "Scars" | 2018 | — | Non-album singles |
| "Simple Things" | 2019 | — | Non-album singles |
| "Chapel Street" (4Trak Sessions) | 2020 | — | 4 Trak Sessions – Volume 1 |
| "If You Want My Love" (4Trak Sessions) | 2020 | — | 4 Trak Sessions – Volume 1 |
| "Little Red Riding Hood" (4Trak Sessions) | 2020 | — | 4 Trak Sessions – Volume 1 |
| "Crystal Water Top" (4Trak Sessions) | 2020 | — | 4 Trak Sessions – Volume 1 |
| "Don't Give Up On Me" (4Trak Sessions) | 2020 | — | 4 Trak Sessions – Volume 1 |
"—" denotes a single that did not chart.

=== Other charted songs ===
List of non-single songs
| Title | Year | Peak chart positions | |
| Title | Year | AUS | NZ |
|---|---|---|---|
| "Reckless" | 2014 | 50 | — |
| "Budapest" | 2014 | 15 | 29 |
| "New Sensation" | 2014 | 90 | — |
| "Stolen Dance" | 2014 | 40 | — |
| "Into My Arms" | 2014 | 36 | — |
| "Crying" | 2014 | 26 | — |
| "Folsom Prison Blues" / "That's All Right (Mama)" | 2014 | 49 | — |
| "The Power of Love" | 2014 | 65 | — |
| "Bette Davis Eyes" | 2014 | 33 | — |
"—" denotes a song that did not chart in that country.

=== Music videos ===
List of music videos
| Title | Year | Director(s) | Ref(s) |
|---|---|---|---|
| "Coming Back" | 2014 | Matt Sharpe | |
| "Me and You" | 2015 | | |
| "I O U (A Heartache)" | 2015 | Luisa Mirabilio | |
| "The Winnings" | 2017 | Dean Ray | |
| "Call It a Day" | 2017 | Dean Ray | |
