= Lately =

Lately may refer to:

== Albums ==
- Lately (album), by Raymond Cilliers, 2005
- Lately (EP), by Ivy, 1994
- Lately, an EP by Celeste, or the title song, 2019

== Songs ==
- "Lately" (Divine song), 1998; covered by Samantha Mumba, 2001
- "Lately" (Lisa Scott-Lee song), 2003
- "Lately" (Macy Gray song), 2010
- "Lately" (Skunk Anansie song), 1999
- "Lately" (Stevie Wonder song), 1981; covered by Jodeci, 1993; covered by S Club 7, 2001
- "Lately" (Tyrese song), 1999
- "Lately", by British Sea Power from The Decline of British Sea Power, 2003
- "Lately", by Brother Clyde from Brother Clyde, 2010
- "Lately", by David Gray from Life in Slow Motion, 2005
- "Lately", by Day of Fire from Losing All, 2010
- "Lately", by Ed Sheeran from No. 5 Collaborations Project, 2011
- "Lately", by Greg Brown from The Poet Game, 1994
- "Lately", by INXS from X, 1990
- "Lately", by Jamila Woods from Heavn, 2016
- "Lately", by Livin Out Loud from What About Us, 2006
- "Lately", by Liz McClarnon
- "Lately", by Massive Attack from Blue Lines, 1991
- "Lately", by Memoryhouse, 2010
- "Lately", by Metronomy from Metronomy Forever, 2019
- "Lately", by Noah Cyrus, 2018
- "Lately", by the Red Hot Chili Peppers, a B-side of "Dani California", 2006
- "Lately", by Soul Asylum from The Silver Lining, 2006
- "Lately", by Soulsavers from Angels & Ghosts, 2015

== See also ==
- "Lately I", a song by Faith Evans, 1999
