= Marlisa (album) =

Studio album by Marlisa
- Released: 7 November 2014
- Recorded: 2014
- Genre: Pop
- Length: 37:48
- Label: Sony
- Producers: DNA Songs; Dorian West

Singles from Marlisa
- 1. "Stand by You" Released: 20 October 2014

Marlisa is the self-titled debut studio album by Australian singer Marlisa Punzalan, released after she won the sixth season of The X Factor Australia, through Sony Music Australia on 7 November 2014. The album peaked at number two on the ARIA Singles Chart. The album was certified Gold by the Australian Recording Industry Association for shipments of more than 35,000 copies and was the 83rd best-selling album of 2014 in Australia. The album features her lead single "Stand by You" and re-recorded studio tracks of some of the songs she performed on the show.

== Commercial performance ==
Marlisa debuted at number two on the ARIA Albums Chart and was certified Platinum by the Australian Recording Industry Association for sales exceeding 70,000 copies.

== Track listing ==
No.	Title	Writer(s)	Producer(s)	Length
1.	"Stand by You"	Anthony Egizii; David Musumeci; Hayley Warner	DNA Songs	3:12
2.	"Yesterday" (The Beatles song)	John Lennon; Paul McCartney	Dorian West	3:15
3.	"All by Myself" (Celine Dion song)	Eric Carmen; Sergei Rachmaninoff	West	3:18
4.	"Hopelessly Devoted to You" (Olivia Newton-John song)	John Farrar	West	2:58
5.	"Let It Go" (Demi Lovato song)	Kristen Anderson-Lopez; Robert Lopez	West	3:46
6.	"Nothing Else Matters" (Metallica song)	James Hetfield; Lars Ulrich	West	3:45
7.	"Try" (Pink song)	Busbee; Ben West	West	3:55
8.	"Titanium" (David Guetta song)	Sia Furler; Pierre David Guetta; Giorgio Tuinfort; Nick Van De Wall	West	3:57
9.	"Somewhere Over the Rainbow" (Judy Garland song)	E.Y. Harburg	West	2:46
10.	"Girl on Fire" (Alicia Keys song)	Alicia Augello Cook; Salaam Remi; Jeff Bhasker; Billy Squier	West	3:21
11.	"Impossible" (Shontelle song)	Arnthor Birgisson; Ina Wroldsen	West	3:35

== Charts ==
=== Weekly charts ===
Chart (2014)	Peak position
Australian Albums (ARIA)	6
New Zealand Albums (RMNZ)	11

=== Year-end charts ===
Chart (2014)	Position
Australian Albums (ARIA)	83
Australian Artist Albums (ARIA)	23

== Certifications ==
Region	Certification	Certified units/sales
Australia (ARIA)	Gold	35,000^{^}
^{^} Shipments figures based on certification alone.
