= Living Dangerously (song) =

Single by Dami Im

from the album Heart Beats
- Released: 9 October 2014
- Length: 4:15
- Label: Sony
- Songwriter(s): Dami Im; Liz Webber; Jon Hume
- Producer(s): Jon Hume

Dami Im singles chronology
"Gladiator" (2014)	"Living Dangerously" (2014)	"Smile" (2015)

"Living Dangerously" is a song by Australian recording artist Dami Im. It was written by Im, Liz Webber and Jon Hume, and produced by Hume. The song was released on 9 October 2014, as the third and final single from Im's third studio album Heart Beats. Sony had wanted "Living Dangerously" to be the album's second single, but Im argued for "Gladiator".

On the 25 October 2014, Im performed the song at Macau, China during the non-competitive 2014 ABU TV Song Festival.

== Music videos ==
A music video was filmed in Adelaide over several days. According to Im, it was a "crazy video" with circus scenes, a motor bike going around in a loop [and] Im dressed in a rugby outfit. Im said "there was a fun story going through the video". Sony watched the edit of the video and "didn't like it" and wouldn't release it.

A second video was filmed, involving Im performing the song in a studio with piano and candles, but Sony didn’t like this one either.

Neither videos were released for the song and Im has never seen either version.

== Reception ==
Mike Wass of Idolator described "Living Dangerously" as a "gorgeous pop anthem", further complimenting it saying "the soaring anthem is the perfect vehicle for Dami's powerful pipes.". Asif Mumtaz of All Noise said "Dami's powerful vocals are perfect for "Living Dangerously" as she soars above the electronic beat to fill up the track with life. She even sets fire to the chorus through her emotional execution."

== Promotion ==
On 18 October 2014, Im performed "Gladiator" and "Living Dangerously" at the 26th annual Australian Commercial Radio Awards. Im performed "Living Dangerously" on Sunrise on 23 October 2014.

== Release history ==
Country	Date	Format	Version(s)	Label
Australia	9 October 2014	digital download	Main version	Sony Music Australia
