= The Sellout (album) =

Studio album by Macy Gray
- Released: June 21, 2010
- Recorded: 2008–2010
- Studio: 2nd Floor Studios (Los Angeles, CA); Ameraycan Studios (Los Angeles, CA); Can Am Studios (Tarzana, CA); Encore Studios (Los Angeles, CA); Larrabee Sound Studios (North Hollywood, CA); Paramount Studios (Los Angeles, CA); The Pass (Los Angeles, CA); Record Plant (Los Angeles, CA)
- Genre: R&B; soul; neo soul
- Length: 45:05
- Label: Concord
- Producer: Macy Gray; Jared and Whitey; Caviar; Kaz James; Rodney Jerkins

Macy Gray chronology
Big (2007)	The Sellout (2010)	Covered (2012)

Singles from The Sellout
- 1. "Beauty in the World" Released: March 30, 2010; 2. "Kissed It" Released: May 24, 2010; 3. "Lately" Released: June 14, 2010

The Sellout is the fifth studio album by American singer and songwriter Macy Gray. It was released on June 22, 2010, by Concord Records. The album's lead single, "Beauty in the World" was released in April 2010. Upon its release, The Sellout received generally mixed reviews from most music critics.

== Background ==
Gray announced the album on her website, stating that it had been a work in progress since 2008. She wrote:

Since November 2008, I've been working hard on my fifth album and am so excited for you to hear it. It is called "The Sellout." It's about all the mountains I've been climbing to be where I want to be in my personal and professional life. It is most certainly my best work and we are almost finished. The album is produced by Myself, Jared and Whitey, Caviar, Kaz James and Rodney Jerkins. It includes a duet with the legendary Bobby Brown and performances by the best musicians I've ever known. Check in daily for updates on the progress of the record and songs from the record that you will hear here first. - Macy

== Release and promotion ==
The album was originally intended to be released on May 18, 2010, but for unknown reasons its release was pushed to June 22, 2010.

=== Singles ===
The first US single is "Beauty In The World", which has been on three Billboard charts, including the Adult Contemporary and its remix on the Hot Dance Club Songs. The first UK single is "Lately", released on June 14, but failing to reach the UK Singles Chart. It charted better on the Billboard's Hot Dance Club Play, so far, reaching the top-ten. The second US single, "Kissed It" (featuring Velvet Revolver) was released on May 24, and is the featured song on Bravo's summer campaign.

== Critical reception ==
Professional ratings
Aggregate scores
Source	Rating
AnyDecentMusic?	6.0/10
Metacritic	58/100
Review scores
Source	Rating
AllMusic	2.5/5 stars
The Boston Globe	favorable
Entertainment Weekly	B−
The Independent	3/5 stars
MSN Music (Consumer Guide)	A−
The New York Times	mixed
NME	7/10
PopMatters	5/10
Rolling Stone	3/5 stars
Slant Magazine	2.5/5 stars

The Sellout received generally mixed reviews from most music critics. At Metacritic, which assigns a normalized rating out of 100 to reviews from mainstream critics, the album received an average score of 58, based on 17 reviews, which indicates "mixed or average reviews". At AnyDecentMusic?, that collates critical reviews from more than 50 media sources, the album scored 6.0 points out of 10. Andy Gill of The Independent gave it 3 out of 5 stars and wrote that it "suffers much of the same frustrating patchiness, that distinctively emotive voice squandered on material that simply doesn't deserve it". Allmusic writer John Bush shared a similar sentiment and panned Gray's songwriting. MusicOMH writer Talia Soghomonian gave the album 2½ out of 5 stars and wrote "While there is plenty of soul in the sound, there is a lack of body in both delivery and melody". Q gave it 2 out of 5 stars and called it "her blandest record yet: it drifts from nondescript disco-pop and cloying R&B to woefully ersatz glam stomp".

However, The Boston Globe's James Reed commended its production and wrote that it "sands off the edges that have been key to Gray’s appeal". Jeremy Allen of NME gave the album a 7/10 rating and praised Gray for "effortlessly combining classic pop with flamboyant chart-frippery". Entertainment Weekly's Simon Vozick-Levinson gave The Sellout a B− rating and stated "Nothing here will dramatically alter the arc of Gray's career, but The Sellout yields several jams worth hearing". In his consumer guide for MSN Music, critic Robert Christgau gave the album an A− rating, indicating "the kind of garden-variety good record that is the great luxury of musical micromarketing and overproduction. Anyone open to its aesthetic will enjoy more than half its tracks".

== Commercial performance ==
The album debuted at number #38 on the US Billboard 200 Album Chart, selling 11,000 copies, less than half the number of copies her last album, Big, sold in the same time-frame. It dropped to number #133 on its second week.

== Track listing ==
No.	Title	Writer(s)	Producer(s)	Length
1.	"The Sellout"	Macy Gray, Chauncey Hollis, Chase N. Cashe	Hit-Boy, Chase N. Cashe	3:58
2.	"Lately"	Gray, Kaz James, Mellissa "Honey" Larochelle, Lazonate Franklin, Ely Weisfeld, Jamie Almos	Kaz James, The Brothers Rise	2:57
3.	"Kissed It" (featuring Velvet Revolver)	Gray, Franklin, Kannon "Caviar" Kross, Corey "Oz" Simon	Kross, Simon	4:36
4.	"Still Hurts" (featuring Romika)	Gray, Teedra Moses, Lamar "Kromic" Mitchell, Jared Gosselin	Gosselin, Phillip White	3:50
5.	"Beauty in the World"	Gray, Josh Lopez, George Reichart, Kross	Gray, Kross, Simon	3:50
6.	"Help Me"	Gray, Rock City, Rodney Jerkins	Jerkins	4:37
7.	"Let You Win"	Gray, Phillip White, Larochelle, Samir Elmehdaoui	Gosselin, White	3:57
8.	"That Man"	Gray, Mel Hinds, White, Mitchell	White	3:33
9.	"Stalker"	Gray, Tony Hardy	Gosselin, White	2:27
10.	"Real Love" (featuring Bobby Brown)	Gray, White, Larochelle, Elmehdaoui, Freddie Moffett, Gosselin	Gosselin, White	4:03
11.	"On & On"	Gray, Mika Lett, Meelah Williams, Hit-Boy, Don Cannon	Hit-Boy, Cannon	3:19
12.	"The Comeback"	Gray, White, Hardy, Gosselin	Gosselin, Gray	4:04
Total length:				45:05

iTunes pre-order bonus track
No.	Title	Length
13.	"Lost"	3:21

Target limited deluxe edition bonus tracks
No.	Title	Length
13.	"Lately" (Acoustic Version)
14.	"Beauty in the World" (Island Mix)
15.	"The Comeback" (Acoustic Version)

== Charts ==
Chart (2010)	Peak position
Australian Urban Albums (ARIA)	14
Austrian Albums (Ö3 Austria)	70
Belgian Albums (Ultratop Flanders)	88
Belgian Albums (Ultratop Wallonia)	72
Canadian Albums (Nielsen SoundScan)	97
Dutch Albums (Album Top 100)	76
French Albums (SNEP)	62
Greek International Albums (IFPI)	10
Polish Albums (ZPAV)	42
Swiss Albums (Schweizer Hitparade)	28
UK Albums (OCC)	128
US Billboard 200	38
