= Beauty in the World =

Single by Macy Gray

from the album The Sellout
- Released: March 30, 2010
- Recorded: 2009
- Genre: Pop
- Length: 3:51
- Label: Island, Concord
- Songwriters: Macy Gray, Kannon Cross, Joshua Lopez, George Reichart

Macy Gray singles chronology
"Can't Hold Back" (2009)	"Beauty in the World" (2010)	"Kissed It" (2010)

"Beauty in the World" is a song by American singer Macy Gray from her fifth studio album, The Sellout (2010). It was released digitally in the United States on March 30, 2010, as the album's lead single. The song was featured in the final scene of the series finale of the ABC comedy-drama series Ugly Betty on April 14, 2010, titled "Hello Goodbye", as well as in the films Killers (2010) and A Little Bit of Heaven (2011), and in Microsoft videos for Internet Explorer 9.

== Background and writing ==
The Sellout, Gray's fifth album and first since her under-performing 2007 album, Big. Gray spoke on how she was disappointed during this period. "I thought after Big flopped maybe I should do what everyone else was doing," she said. "Go out and hire the hottest producers, the best writers, get real skinny. But none of those people called me back."

The song was inspired by hearing her daughter's laughter on a down day. "I didn't even know what she was laughing at. I thought 'at least she's happy.' And I felt at least I hadn't failed there, because my daughter's happy."

== Promotion ==
Gray performed the song on The Tonight Show with Jay Leno on May 12. She also went to Good Morning America on June 23, and on The View on June 24.

== Track listing ==
1. "Beauty in the World" – 3:52

== Reception ==
Monica Herrera from Billboard magazine gave a positive review for the song, saying that: "Gray makes a strong case for her ability to craft another anthemic pop song. Nonthreatening folk pop is the vehicle of choice here: Over hand claps, a casual guitar strum and jangly tambourine, Gray sings, 'Listen to the sound, and lose it/Its sweet music, and dance with me.' While the concept feels a little hokey—as does rhyming 'beauty in the world' with 'shake your booty, boys and girls' in the chorus—it's the kind of song that should appeal to the singer's original fan base." John Bush from AllMusic did not find the song appealing, going on to say that it "has a lyric and melody by Gray alone, and despite the positive sentiments in the song, its melody is unmemorable and it includes a few embarrassing lines (e.g., 'There is beauty in this world/So much beauty in this world/Always beauty in this world/So much beauty in this world/Shake your booty boys and girls/For the beauty in the world')".

== Music video ==
=== First version ===
The video for the song, directed by Adria Petty premiered on April 9, 2010, and features Gray performing the song with cheerleaders, kids jumping rope, dancing and hand-clapping.

=== Second version ===
A second version of the video was made due to the 2010 FIFA World Cup and was titled "Beauty in the World Cup". The World Cup-themed music video for "Beauty in the World" shows Macy with models and soccer players in dresses and heels.

== Charts ==
=== Weekly charts ===
Chart (2010)	Peak position
Japan (Japan Hot 100)	49
Netherlands (Single Top 100)	52
US Adult Contemporary (Billboard)	23
US Adult Pop Airplay (Billboard)	40
US Dance Club Songs (Billboard)	2

=== Year-end charts ===
Chart (2010)	Position
US Dance Club Songs (Billboard)	41

== Dami Im cover ==
Dami Im Australian pop singer, who won the fifth season of the Australian X Factor and placed second at the 2016 Eurovision Song Contest performed a cover of the song for the Australian 2015 film Paper Planes. She recorded a version of the song for her studio album Heart Beats which was released on 17 October 2014.
