= Heart Beats (Dami Im album) =

Studio album by Dami Im
- Released: 14 October 2014
- Recorded: 2014
- Genre: Pop
- Length: 36:52
- Label: Sony
- Producers: Phil Buckle; Tom Coyne; Robby De Sa; Carl Dimitaga; Ross Fraser; Jon Hume; Dami Im; Louis Schoorl; DNA Songs; Trinity

Dami Im chronology
Dami Im (2013)	Heart Beats (2014)	Classic Carpenters (2016)

Singles from Heart Beats
- 1. "Super Love" Released: 16 May 2014; 2. "Gladiator" Released: 8 August 2014; 3. "Living Dangerously" Released: 9 October 2014

Heart Beats is the third studio album by Australian recording artist Dami Im, released on 14 October 2014 by Sony Music Australia. While Im's previous self-titled debut album consisted of cover songs she performed on The X Factor Australia, Heart Beats features a mixture of original ballads and up-tempo pop songs. Im worked on the album with many songwriters and producers, including Robby De Sa, Jon Hume, Christian Lo Russo, Louis Schoorl, DNA Songs, Trinity and Hayley Warner.

Upon its release, Heart Beats debuted at number seven on the ARIA Albums Chart and became Im's second top-ten album. The album was preceded by the release of its first two singles, "Super Love" and "Gladiator", both of which peaked at number 11 on the Australian ARIA Singles Chart. The former also reached the top-twenty on the South Korea Gaon Charts and was certified platinum by the Australian Recording Industry Association, while the latter was certified gold.

== Background and development ==
Heart Beats is the follow-up to Im's self-titled debut album, which featured re-recorded covers of the selected songs she performed as a finalist on The X Factor Australia. In May 2014, during an interview with InStyle magazine, Im revealed that she had already begun work on the album and that she was hoping to release it in September or October. The following month, Im told Renowned for Sound that she was co-writing a majority of the album's songs as she wanted to put her "own flavour" into the songs. Then in August 2014, Im revealed to Pop Sugar that the album was "95 percent finished" and that she was still thinking of a name for it and ideas for the album cover. On 25 September 2014, Im announced that the album would be called Heart Beats. She worked on Heart Beats with several record producers and songwriters, including Jon Hume, DNA Songs, Trinity, Hayley Warner and Louis Schoorl, among others.

== Music and lyrics ==
Heart Beats features a mixture of ballads and up-tempo pop songs. In terms of musical direction, Im attempted to avoid going for one particular sound as she wanted Heart Beats "to be an album that people of all generations can listen to, not just the younger generation". She described the album as having different moods that show who she is as a person and as an artist. The album's opening track "Super Love" is an up-tempo dance-pop and synthpop song, with lyrics that represent Im's love for her husband Noah Kim and "the many other aspects of life that evoke" love. Jake Cleland of The Vine compared "Super Love" to David Guetta's work, Avicii's "Wake Me Up" (2013) and Katy Perry's "Firework" (2010). The second song "Gladiator" is a mid-tempo pop ballad that explores the theme of female empowerment, as Im sings about the need to make a man fall in love with her by fighting for his love "like a gladiator". Several critics also compared "Gladiator" to Perry's work. The sixth track, "Speak Up", is Im's favourite track on the album. It is a ballad that she says "really explores all the vocal ranges". Lyrically, the song is about "speaking out" and "showing the world who [she] is as a person". The seventh track on Heart Beats is Im's cover version of the 2010 Macy Gray song "Beauty in the World". The tenth track "Heart Beats Again" was solely written by Im.

== Release and promotion ==
On 25 September 2014, Im announced the release date for Heart Beats on her social media platforms. The following day, Heart Beats was made available to pre-order online through iTunes, JB Hi-Fi and Sanity. "Heart Beats Again" was released as a promotional single from the album. Fans who pre-ordered Heart Beats on iTunes would instantly receive the song for free. On 28 September 2014, Im performed at Nickelodeon Australia's Slimefest concert in Melbourne. Heart Beats was released digitally in South Korea on 14 October 2014. It was later released digitally and physically in Australia on 17 October 2014, as both standard and deluxe editions. The latter edition included five bonus tracks. Im performed and signed physical copies of the album during appearances at World Square (17 October 2014) and Westfield Knox (18 October 2014). She also performed "Gladiator" and "Living Dangerously" at the 26th annual Australian Commercial Radio Awards, held on 18 October 2014. Im performed "Living Dangerously" on Sunrise on 23 October 2014. In December 2014, Im was the supporting act for John Legend's Australian leg of his All of Me Tour.

=== Singles ===
"Super Love" was released as the lead single from Heart Beats on 16 May 2014. The song received positive reviews from critics, many of whom praised its production. "Super Love" peaked at number 11 on the ARIA Singles Chart and was certified platinum by the Australian Recording Industry Association for sales exceeding 70,000 copies. It also reached number 12 on the South Korea Gaon International Download Chart and number 16 on the South Korea Gaon International Digital Chart. The album's second single "Gladiator" was released on 8 August 2014. Critics praised the song's production and Im's vocal performance. Upon its release, "Gladiator" also peaked at number 11 on the ARIA Singles Chart and was certified gold for sales exceeding 35,000 copies. "Living Dangerously" was released on 9 October 2014 as the third single from Heart Beats, but failed to impact the charts.

== Reception ==
Marcus Floyd of Renowned for Sound awarded Heart Beats five stars out of five and wrote that it was "a great effort" from Im, noting that "each track has its own story to tell and part to play to make the release one of this year's stand outs". For the week ending 25 October 2014, Heart Beats debuted at number 32 on the South Korea Gaon International Albums Chart. In Australia, Heart Beats debuted at number seven on the ARIA Albums Chart issue dated 27 October 2014, with first-week sales of 3,693 copies. This gave Im her second top-ten album, however, it failed to match the number one peak that her previous self-titled album reached.

== Track listing ==
Heart Beats — Standard edition
No.	Title	Writer(s)	Producer(s)	Length
1.	"Super Love"	Fredrik Häggstam; Sebastian Lundberg; Johan Gustafson; Hayley Aitken	Trinity; Tom Coyne	3:25
2.	"Gladiator"	Dami Im; Häggstam; Lundberg; Gustafson	Trinity	3:41
3.	"Living Dangerously"	Im; Liz Webber; Jon Hume	Hume	4:15
4.	"Without You"	Louis Schoorl; Hayley Warner; Emma Birdsall	Schoorl	3:27
5.	"Moment Just Like This"	Im; Carl Dimataga	Dimataga	3:13
6.	"Speak Up"	Im; Christian Lo Russo; Webber; Hume	Hume	4:37
7.	"Beauty in the World"	Natalie McIntyre; Joshua Lopez; Kannon Cross; George Reichart	Dimataga	2:55
8.	"Let Go"	Hume; Kayla Rae Bonnici	Hume	3:42
9.	"One More Time"	Im; Anthony Egizii; David Musumeci	DNA Songs	3:46
10.	"Heart Beats Again"	Im	Dimataga	3:51

Heart Beats — Deluxe edition (bonus tracks)
No.	Title	Writer(s)	Producer(s)	Length
11.	"The Hunger"	Häggstam; Lundberg; Gustafson	Trinity	3:38
12.	"Heart So Dry"	Robby De Sa; Natalie Dunn; Lo Russo	De Sa	3:29
13.	"Solid Ground (Stop the World)"	Im; Phil Buckle; Ross Fraser	Buckle; Fraser; Im	3:47
14.	"Beautiful"	Im; Bonnici; Hume	Hume	4:04
15.	"Without You" (Acoustic)	Schoorl; Warner; Birdsall	Schoorl	3:30

== Personnel ==
Adapted from album liner.

Performers and musicians

- Dami Im – vocals, background vocals, piano
- Jon Hume – guitar, keyboards, piano
- Louis Schoorl – piano, bass, drums
- Rowan Lowe – bass
- Damian de Boos-Smith – guitar, ukulele, banjo
- Carl Dimataga – guitar, piano, bass, keyboards
- Kayla Rae Bonnici – background vocals
- Anthony Egizii – keyboards
- David Musumeci – guitar
- Natalie Dunn – background vocals
- Robby De Sa – keyboards
- Ricky Edwards – brass
- Ben Robertson – double bass
- Michael Tan – violin
- Dora Maria – violin, viola
- Julienne Guerbois – cello

Technical personnel

- Trinity – mixing, production, recording
- Jon Hume – programming, recording, mixing
- Louis Schoorl – production, programming
- Carl Dimataga – production, mixing, recording
- Adrian Breakspear – mixing
- Anthony Egizii – programming
- Robby De Sa – programming
- Phil Buckle – production, mixing
- Ross Fraser – production
- Dami Im – production, string arrangement
- Ricky Edwards – programming

== Charts ==
Chart (2014)	Peak position
Australian Albums (ARIA)	7
South Korean International Albums (Gaon)	32

== Release history ==
Region	Date	Format	Edition(s)	Label	Catalogue	Ref.
South Korea	14 October 2014	Digital download	Standard	Sony Music Entertainment		
Australia	17 October 2014	CD; digital download	Standard; deluxe	Sony Music Australia	88875012942	
