= Super Love (Dami Im song) =

Single by Dami Im

from the album Heart Beats
- Released: 16 May 2014
- Genre: Dance-pop; synthpop
- Length: 3:24
- Label: Sony
- Songwriters: Hayley Aitken; Johan Gustafson; Fredrik Häggstam; Sebastian Lundberg
- Producers: Trinity; Tom Coyne

Dami Im singles chronology
"Jolene (Acoustic)" (2014)	"Super Love" (2014)	"Gladiator" (2014)

"Super Love" is a song by Australian recording artist Dami Im. It was written by Hayley Aitken, Johan Gustafson, Fredrik Häggstam and Sebastian Lundberg, and produced by the latter three with Tom Coyne. "Super Love" was released on 16 May 2014, as the lead single from Im's third studio album Heart Beats. The song is dedicated to her husband Noah Kim because of the sacrifices he has made for her career. Musically, "Super Love" is an uptempo dance-pop and synthpop song that incorporates elements of R&B. Its lyrics represent Im's love for her husband and "the many other aspects of life that evoke" love.

"Super Love" received positive reviews from critics, who praised its production and Im's vocals. Upon its release, the song reached number 11 on the Australian ARIA Singles Chart, number 12 on the South Korea Gaon International Download Chart and number 16 on the South Korea Gaon International Digital Chart. It was certified platinum by the Australian Recording Industry Association for sales exceeding 70,000 copies. The accompanying music video was directed by James Chappell and features Im walking through the streets of Sydney in a superhero outfit, bringing joy and happiness to those around her. Im promoted "Super Love" with performances on radio and television programs. The song was also used to promote the sixth season of The X Factor Australia.

== Background and release ==
"Super Love" was written by Hayley Aitken, Johan Gustafson, Fredrik Häggstam and Sebastian Lundberg, and produced by the latter three under their production name Trinity with Tom Coyne. The song was also mixed by Trinity. When Im heard the demo of "Super Love", she immediately wanted to record the song because she felt its message and vibe was right for her. She described the song as positive, fun and optimistic. Im dedicated "Super Love" to her husband Noah Kim, who left his job as a social worker to accompany her on all her travels. In an interview with The Daily Telegraph, she said: "Whenever I sing the song, it just reminds me of the kind of love I've been getting from Noah. He left his job to be with me cause I was never able to come home much and I was just travelling all over the country and doing things and he wanted to be with me. He's been so supportive." Im chose "Super Love" as the song to launch her pop career in her birth country Korea. She visited Korea with her X Factor mentor Dannii Minogue and showcased "Super Love" to record label bosses.

"Super Love" premiered on Australian radio stations on 8 May 2014. It was then released both digitally and physically on 16 May 2014, as the first single from Im's third studio album Heart Beats. The physical edition features an acoustic version of "Super Love" alongside the original version. The song was released in South Korea on 19 May 2014. The acoustic version was released digitally on 13 June 2014. A 7th Heaven club mix of "Super Love" was released digitally on 20 June 2014. In an interview with the Australian Associated Press, Im revealed that she had considered recording the song in Korean. The Korean version was later released digitally in South Korea on 3 September 2014.

== Composition ==
"Super Love" is an uptempo dance-pop and synthpop song that displays elements of R&B. The instrumentation is provided by a piano, synthesizer, banjo, violin and guitar. According to Mike Wass of Idolator, the song starts with a piano "before it explodes into an upbeat pop moment." Jake Cleland of The Vine compared "Super Love" to David Guetta's work, Avicii's "Wake Me Up" (2013) and Katy Perry's "Firework" (2010). Lyrically, it is a "meaningful exploration" of Im's "love for not only her husband Noah, but also the many other aspects of life that evoke the special emotion." In an interview with Renowned for Sound, Im discussed the meaning behind the song, saying: "I'm really passionate about this song because it's about love, and who your 'super love' is. For me it's my husband Noah, but it's also my fans that have supported me since X Factor. Everybody has a super love, whether it be their partner, mother, brother or even their dog, and this song is to remind everyone of that."

== Reception ==
A writer for Take 40 Australia described "Super Love" as "fantastic" and wrote that it sounds like a "great upbeat anthem." Another writer for the same publication called the song "AMAAAZING!", praised the "top notch" production and noted that "it is a very Dami [Im] kind of song." Nova FM called it a "catchy tune", while Kathy McCabe of the Herald Sun noted that the song "showcases Im's impressive vocals." Mike Wass of Idolator described "Super Love" as "an absolute gem" and wrote that it "puts an interesting female spin on the currently hot acoustic-infused synth-pop genre." Jake Cleland of The Vine compared "Super Love" to Im's debut single "Alive", writing: "Where 'Alive' was a minor key stomper, though, 'Super Love' is a sugar rush, and the faster pace works for the theme. 'Alive' wasn't really all that lively, but 'Super Love' is racy and triumphant and inclusive."

For the week ending 24 May 2014, "Super Love" debuted at number 12 on the South Korea Gaon International Download Chart with sales of 7,737 copies, and number 16 on the South Korea Gaon International Digital Chart. In Australia, "Super Love" debuted at number 25 on the ARIA Singles Chart issue dated 26 May 2014, and became Im's fourteenth entry on that chart. The following week, the song moved up nine spots to number 16. In its third week, "Super Love" moved up five positions to its peak of number 11. It was certified platinum by the Australian Recording Industry Association for selling over 70,000 copies.

== Music video ==
"It was really fun putting ideas together and being really involved in the creative process. The idea of the video is that I'm a superhero who sends love to people around the world, and the different characters in the video represent the different types of people around the world. It's a video that's about feeling good, and I wanted it to entertain people."

— Im talking to Renowned for Sound about the idea behind the video.

The music video was directed by James Chappell and uploaded to Im's Vevo account on 16 May 2014. Some scenes in the video were filmed at Mt Steel in Moore Park, New South Wales. In an interview with TheFix, Im's team revealed that she "was heavily involved in the creative direction" of the video and that it was "on point with what she wanted." The video begins with Im playing the piano on the top of a hill overlooking the city of Sydney. She is then seen walking around Sydney, wearing a silver and blue outfit with a cape and pink wig, bringing joy and happiness to the people she comes into contact with. Im leads them through the streets to a nearby hilltop, where they all dance and Slip 'n Slide down the hill. Carmalena Murdaca of the TheFix described the video as "futuristic" and wrote that Im's taken it "to sexy new heights." Idolator's Mike Wass thought the video was "a tad corny" but noted it is "guaranteed to put a smile on your face."

== Usage in media and live performances ==
In May–June 2014, "Super Love" was used to promote the then-upcoming sixth season of The X Factor Australia. Im first performed the song during a showcase and press conference in Seoul, South Korea on 7 May 2014. She also performed "Super Love" on televised shows, Sunday Night (25 May 2014), Sunrise (26 May 2014) and The Riff (27 May 2014), and on radio shows, Nova FM (27 May 2014), The Dan & Maz Show (27 May 2014) and Take 40 Australia (29 May 2014). Im performed "Super Love" during instore appearances at Capalaba Central Shopping Centre in Capalaba, Queensland (24 May 2014) and Woodgrove Shopping Centre in Melton, Victoria (29 May 2014). On 28 September 2014, Marlisa Punzalan covered the song during the eighth live show of the sixth season of The X Factor Australia.

== Track listing ==
- Digital download
1. "Super Love" – 3:24
- Digital download
1. "Super Love" (Acoustic version) – 3:29
- Digital download
1. "Super Love" (7th Heaven Club Mix) – 6:17
- CD single
1. "Super Love" – 3:24
2. "Super Love" (Acoustic version) – 3:29

== Personnel ==
- Dami Im – vocals
- Hayley Aitken – songwriter
- Tom Coyne – producer
- Johan Gustafson – songwriter
- Fredrik Häggstam – songwriter
- Sebastian Lundberg – songwriter
- Trinity – mixing engineer, producer

== Charts ==
=== Weekly charts ===
Chart (2014)	Peak position
Australia (ARIA)	11
South Korea (Gaon International Digital)	16
South Korea (Gaon International Download)	12

=== Year-end chart ===
Chart (2014)	Position
Australian Artist Singles (ARIA)	23

== Certifications ==
Region	Certification	Certified units/sales
Australia (ARIA)	Platinum	70,000^{^}
^{^} Shipments figures based on certification alone.

== Release history ==
Country	Date	Format	Version(s)	Label
Australia	8 May 2014	Radio premiere	Main version	Sony Music Australia
Australia	16 May 2014	Digital download	Main version	Sony Music Australia
Australia	16 May 2014	CD	Main version; Acoustic version	Sony Music Australia
South Korea	19 May 2014	Digital download	Main version	Sony Music Entertainment
Australia	13 June 2014	Digital download	Acoustic version	Sony Music Australia
Australia	20 June 2014	Digital download	7th Heaven Club Mix	Sony Music Australia
South Korea	3 September 2014	Digital download	Korean version	Sony Music Entertainment
