= Stand by You (Marlisa song) =

Single by Marlisa

from the album Marlisa
- Released: 20 October 2014
- Recorded: 2014
- Genre: Pop
- Length: 3:12
- Label: Sony
- Songwriters: Anthony Egizii; David Musumeci; Hayley Warner
- Producer: DNA

Marlisa singles chronology
"Stand by You" (2014)	"Unstoppable" (2015)

"Stand by You" is the debut and winner's single by Marlisa, the series six winner of The X Factor Australia. It was released digitally on 20 October 2014 as the lead single from her self-titled debut album. The song debuted at number two on the ARIA Singles Chart and was certified platinum by the Australian Recording Industry Association for sales exceeding 70,000 copies.

== Background and release ==
"Stand by You" was written by Anthony Egizii, David Musumeci and Hayley Warner. It was also produced by Egizii and Musumeci under their production name DNA. After winning The X Factor, "Stand by You" was released for digital download in Australia on 20 October 2014, as Marlisa's debut and winner's single. The following day, the song was released as a CD single. For the issue dated 27 October 2014, "Stand by You" debuted at number two on the ARIA Singles Chart, with three-day sales of 27,666 copies. Marlisa became the first X Factor winner since Altiyan Childs in 2010 to not debut at number one with her winner's single. In its fifth week, "Stand by You" was certified platinum by the Australian Recording Industry Association for sales exceeding 70,000 copies.

== Live performances ==
Marlisa performed "Stand by You" live for the first time during The X Factor grand final performance show on 19 October 2014. She performed the song again during the grand final decider show the following day, after she was announced as the winner.

== Track listing ==
- CD / digital download
1. "Stand by You" – 3:12

== Charts ==
=== Weekly charts ===
Chart (2014)	Peak position
Australia (ARIA)	2
New Zealand (Recorded Music NZ)	21

=== Year-end charts ===
Chart (2014)	Position
Australia (ARIA)	71
Australian Artist Singles (ARIA)	14

== Certifications ==
Region	Certification	Certified units/sales
Australia (ARIA)	Platinum	70,000^{^}
^{^} Shipments figures based on certification alone.

== Release history ==
Country	Date	Format	Label
Australia	20 October 2014	Digital download	Sony Music Australia
Australia	21 October 2014	CD	Sony Music Australia
