= Heart Beats Again =

Promotional single by Dami Im

from the album Heart Beats
- Released: 30 September 2014
- Genre: Pop
- Length: 3:51
- Label: Sony
- Songwriter: Dami Im
- Producer: Carl Dimitaga

"Heart Beats Again" is a song recorded by Australian singer and songwriter Dami Im for her third studio album, Heart Beats. It was written by Im and produced by Carl Dimitaga. The song was released on 30 September 2014, as a promotional single from Heart Beats. Upon its release, "Heart Beats Again" debuted at number 92 on the ARIA Singles Chart.

== Background and release ==
"Heart Beats Again" was solely written by Dami Im and produced by Carl Dimitaga. It was the last song written for her third studio album Heart Beats. Im said that "Heart Beats Again" has a double meaning, with one being that it is about the two loves in her life—husband Noah Kim and Jesus. She spoke about the song in an interview with BuzzFeed, saying: "It's the last song that I wrote for this album. [The album] was kind of finished, and I just thought 'Mmm, I still need one more song to kind of summarise the album and make it really, truly my own'. I wrote 'Heart Beats [Again]' at home, by myself, and it might not be a perfect song, but I just felt like it really expressed, like, the essence of why I'm doing this. It's the song that represents who I am, in an unpolluted way."

"Heart Beats Again" was released digitally on 30 September 2014, as a promotional single from Heart Beats. Fans who pre-ordered the album on iTunes would instantly receive "Heart Beats Again" for free. For the issue dated 13 October 2014, "Heart Beats Again" debuted at number 92 on the ARIA Singles Chart.

== Track listing ==
- Digital download
1. "Heart Beats Again" – 3:51

== Charts ==
Chart (2014)	Peak position
Australia (ARIA)	92

== Release history ==
Country	Date	Format	Label
Australia	30 September 2014	Digital download	Sony Music Australia
South Korea	30 September 2014	Digital download	Sony Music Entertainment
