= Kissed It =

Single by Macy Gray featuring Velvet Revolver

from the album The Sellout
- Released: May 24, 2010 (US only)
- Recorded: 2009
- Genre: R&B, neo soul, pop rock, drum and bass
- Length: 4:36
- Label: Island
- Songwriter(s): Cross, Franklin, Gray, Simon

Macy Gray singles chronology
"Beauty in the World" (2010)	"Kissed It" (2010)	"Lately" (2010)

Velvet Revolver singles chronology
"Get Out the Door" (2008)	"Kissed It" (2010)

Audio
- "Kissed It" on YouTube

"Kissed It" is a song by the American soul singer Macy Gray. It is the second US single from her fifth album The Sellout. The song was released digitally on May 24, 2010 in the United States and features the musicians of Velvet Revolver and Guns N' Roses, Slash, Duff McKagan and Matt Sorum. In September 2010, the song peaked on the Italian Airplay Chart at number 62.

== Promotion ==
Gray performed the song on Later... with Jools Holland on May 26 and on Late Night with Jimmy Fallon on June 24.

== Track listing ==
1. "Kissed It" – 4:36

== Personnel ==
- Macy Gray – vocals
- Slash – guitar
- Duff McKagan – bass
- Matt Sorum – drums, percussion

Note: Slash, McKagan, and Sorum credited as Velvet Revolver.
