= Gladiator (Dami Im song) =

Single by Dami Im

from the album Heart Beats
- Released: 8 August 2014
- Genre: Pop
- Length: 3:41
- Label: Sony
- Songwriters: Dami Im; Johan Gustafson; Fredrik Häggstam; Sebastian Lundberg
- Producer: Trinity

Dami Im singles chronology
"Super Love" (2014)	"Gladiator" (2014)	"Living Dangerously" (2014)

"Gladiator" is a song by Australian singer Dami Im. It was written by Im, Johan Gustafson, Fredrik Häggstam and Sebastian Lundberg, and produced by the latter three under their production name Trinity. The song was released on 8 August 2014, as the second single from Im's third studio album Heart Beats. "Gladiator" is a mid-tempo pop ballad that explores the theme of female empowerment. According to its lyrics, Im sings about the need to make a man fall in love with her by fighting for his love "like a gladiator".

"Gladiator" received positive reviews from critics, who complimented the catchy production and Im's vocal delivery. They also predicted the song to be a commercial success and compared it to the work of Katy Perry. Upon its release, "Gladiator" debuted at number 11 on the Australian ARIA Singles Chart and was certified gold by the Australian Recording Industry Association for sales exceeding 35,000 copies. The accompanying music video was directed by Young Black Youth and features Im's character growing up and training to become a powerful evil-fighting gladiator. The video was well received by critics for its presentation. Im promoted "Gladiator" with performances on television and radio programs and at instore appearances.

== Production and release ==
"Gladiator" was written by Dami Im, Johan Gustafson, Fredrik Häggstam and Sebastian Lundberg. Production of the song was helmed by the latter three under their production name Trinity, who were also behind Im's previous single "Super Love". On 27 July 2014, Im announced that "Gladiator" would be released as her next single. An audio teaser of "Gladiator" was then uploaded to Im's Vevo account on 30 July 2014. The song impacted Australian radio stations on 31 July 2014 and was released both digitally and physically on 8 August 2014, as the second single from Im's third studio album Heart Beats. The physical edition features a karaoke version of "Gladiator" alongside the original version. Two remixes by 7th Heaven were released digitally on 5 September 2014.

The cover art for "Gladiator" was photographed by Peter Brew-Beven. It involved the layering of metallic jewellery that looked like chains and Im wore a pink wig. However, this art work was not approved by Sony and instead, they label opted for a photo used in the same shoot from "Super Love", changing the colour from red to blue, much to the disappointment of Im and the creative team.

== Composition ==
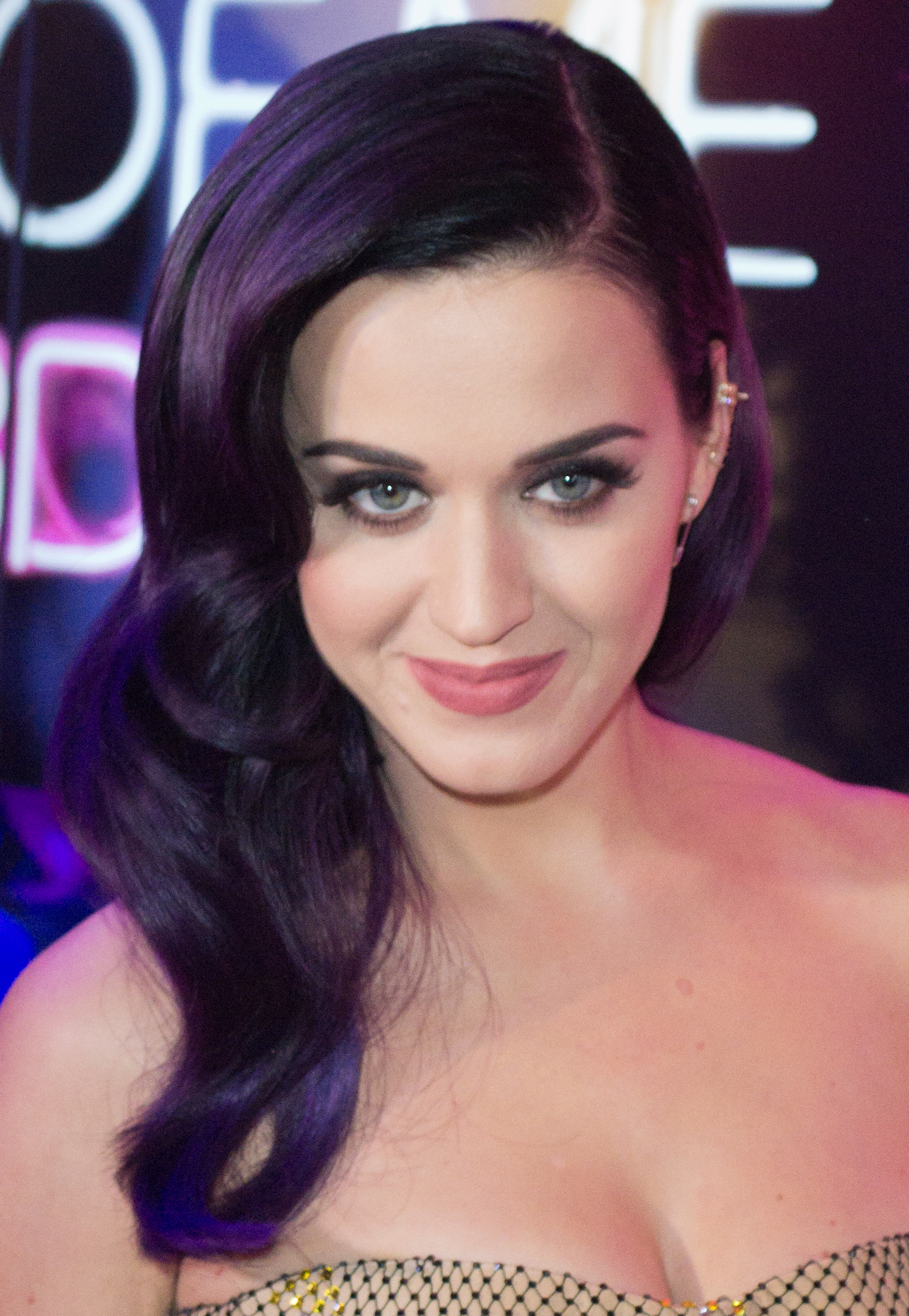
Several critics compared "Gladiator" to the work of American singer Katy Perry

"Gladiator" is a mid-tempo pop ballad with a length of three minutes and forty-one seconds. It consists of "airy, tribal beats", which Andrew Le from Renowned for Sound noted resembles Katy Perry's single "Roar" (2013). Similarly, Mike Wass of Idolator wrote that the song "wouldn't sound out of place on a Katy Perry album", while David Lim of Maximum Pop added that it "sounds like something you would expect Sia to write for Katy Perry". Im's vocals incorporate harmonies, ad-libs, and double tracking "with a bit of vibrato". Le compared her double-tracked vocals to Pink's songs. Kevin of the website Direct Lyrics wrote that "Gladiator" sounds like a song "Ryan Tedder would do circa the Jordin Sparks 'Battlefield' days".

Lyrically, "Gladiator" explores the theme of female empowerment. Im sings about the need to make a man fall in love with her by fighting for his love "like a gladiator", as shown in the lyrics: "Not in it for the glory, I just hope you're waiting for me. Never gonna give up, I won't let nobody harm ya. I will fight for your love like a gladiator". In an interview with Pop Sugar, Im revealed that there is another meaning behind the song "about fighting for yourself, for your confidence, loving yourself, and fighting to achieve that".

== Reception ==
A writer for Take 40 Australia described "Gladiator" as "incredible" and viewed it as "a powerful love song that encapsulates you instantly". The writer also noted that "Gladiator" sees Im's "soaring vocals take off and fly" and predicted that the track will "rise to the top of the charts". Mike Wass of Idolator described "Gladiator" as a "soaring pop anthem" and "pure-pop delight", further complimenting it as "easily one of the catchiest pop songs of 2014". Kevin of Direct Lyrics found the song to be "easy on the ear, radio-friendly" and noted that Im "sings it flawlessly". Nathan Pike of Project U noted that the track "showcases the vocal power" that made Im the winner of The X Factor Australia. Writers for The Hot Hits called "Gladiator" a "killer track" and "soon-to-be smash hit", further adding that "we can't help but feel we can take over the world when we listen to this song".

Phillip Kuoch of the website Hellokpop described the song as "an infectious pop anthem" and praised "Im's big vocal range". Jordan Hirst of Q News wrote that "Gladiator" is "another slice of pure pop that features the incredible pipes Dami put to good use on previous singles 'Alive' and 'Super Love'". David Lim of So So Gay called it a "radio-ready" single that is "armed with a titan chorus you can't imagine lip-synching to without a wind machine present". Andrew Le of Renowned for Sound awarded "Gladiator" three stars out of five and labeled it "another generic song about empowerment". However, he praised Im's "powerhouse vocals" and the song's "uncontainable joy" in "the choruses' sweet yet memorable melody and the vocal harmonies". Le concluded that "Gladiator" could be "another hit single" for Im "that goes hand in hand with her message and image". For the issue dated 18 August 2014, "Gladiator" debuted at number 11 on the Australian ARIA Singles Chart and became Im's fifteenth entry on that chart. The song was certified gold by the Australian Recording Industry Association for selling over 35,000 copies.

== Music video ==
"The video clip for 'Gladiator' was so much fun, the whole process including creating ideas and planning the clip was very exciting. The video clip is very special because I got to work with stuntmen and I had my own stunt double, a double-Dami, who was a male dressed up as a female outfit doing Ninja fighting. It was very special to see the wiring and green screen process".

—Im talking to Girl.com.au about the development of the video.

The music video was directed by Young Black Youth and filmed in Sydney in July 2014. A 16-second teaser of the video was uploaded to Im's Vevo account on 4 August 2014. The official video clip was originally scheduled to premiere on 7 August 2014, however it was released the following day. In an interview with Girl.com.au, Im revealed that she intended for the video to be "a lot more stripped back" than her previous music videos because she "wanted people to focus on the message of the song rather than the outfits".

The video begins with the caption: "The ancient scrolls tell of a legend. That the one who is pure heart would some day reunite the piece of the sacred medallion, rescue the princess and vanquish evil from the kingdom. A true warrior, a gladiator". It then shows Im growing up and training with her master to become a powerful evil-fighting gladiator and fulfill the prophecy of the ancient scrolls. In between these scenes, Im is shown singing the song's lyrics in a room filled with cherry blossoms, orchids and South Korean historic paintings.

Spotlight Report called the video "beautiful", while The Hot Hits described it as "spectacular" and noted that Im looks "stunning" as "she embraces her inner Avatar with scenes involving fire ninjas and water benders". Phillip Kuoch of Hellokpop noted that the clip "is themed around historical Korea" and felt that it reminded him "of Mulan and Avatar combined". Project U's Nathan Pike wrote that the video features "some pretty cool special effects, including water bending, fire bending, an upside-down pyramid and a hologram". Writers for Take 40 Australia thought it was "one of the most beautiful video clips we've seen in a long time".

== Promotion ==
Im promoted "Gladiator" with radio interviews on Smallzy's Surgery (7 August 2014) and The Bump Show (8 August 2014), and television interviews on The Riff (21 August 2014). On 11 August 2014, she performed the song during the first live decider show of the sixth season of The X Factor Australia. For the performance, Im wore a pink latex chiffon dress and performed in a neon-lit carriage surrounded by male backup dancers dressed as samurais. Take 40 Australia wrote that Im made a "triumphant return" to The X Factor and looked like "an international star". Idolator's Mike Wass wrote that Im "put on a dazzling show" and noted that she looked incredible.

Im performed "Gladiator" on Sunrise (13 August 2014) and during instore appearances at Robina Town Centre (3 August 2014) and Westfield Penrith (14 August 2014). She also performed the song on radio shows Fifi & Dave (28 August 2014), Ash, Kip and Luttsy (29 August 2014), The Dan & Maz Show (29 August 2014) and Take 40 Australia (30 August 2014). Im performed "Gladiator" again at the Cabramatta Moon Festival on 7 September 2014.

== Track listing ==
- Digital download
1. "Gladiator" – 3:41
- Digital download
1. "Gladiator" (7th Heaven Pop Mix) – 3:46
2. "Gladiator" (7th Heaven Extended Pop Mix) – 7:58
- CD single
1. "Gladiator" – 3:41
2. "Gladiator" (Karaoke) – 3:41

== Charts ==
=== Weekly chart ===
Chart (2014)	Peak position
Australia (ARIA)	11

=== Year-end chart ===
Chart (2014)	Position
Australian Artist Singles (ARIA)	33

== Certifications ==
Region	Certification	Certified units/sales
Australia (ARIA)	Gold	35,000^{^}
^{^} Shipments figures based on certification alone.

== Release history ==
Country	Date	Format	Version(s)	Label
Australia	31 July 2014	Radio	Main version	Sony Music Australia
Australia	8 August 2014	Digital download	Main version	Sony Music Australia
Australia	8 August 2014	CD	Main version; Karaoke version	Sony Music Australia
South Korea	8 August 2014	Digital download	Main version	Sony Music Entertainment
Australia	5 September 2014	Digital download	7th Heaven Remixes	Sony Music Australia
