= Lately (Macy Gray song) =

Single by Macy Gray

from the album The Sellout
- Released: June 14, 2010 (UK only)
- Recorded: 2009
- Genre: R&B
- Length: 2:56
- Label: Island
- Songwriter(s): Almos, Franklin, Gray, James, Larochelle, Weisfeld

Macy Gray singles chronology
| "Kissed It" (2010) | "Lately" (2010) | "The Sellout" (2010) |

Audio
- "Lately" on YouTube

"Lately" is a song by the American soul singer Macy Gray. It is the first UK single from her fifth album The Sellout. The song was released on June 14, 2010, in the UK and the remixes EP followed on June 17, 2010. "Lately" was a success on the US Billboard Hot Dance Club Play chart, reaching the top ten.

== Promotion ==
Gray performed the song on Later... with Jools Holland on May 26, 2010.

== Critical reception ==
Entertainment Weekly's Simon Vozick-Levinson noted the song as one of its parent album's highlights, describing it as a "sleek disco cut."

== Track listing ==
Remixes EP (released June 17, 2010)

1. "Lately" (Cutmore Remix) – 6:49
2. "Lately" (Nu Addiction Club Remix) – 6:40
3. "Lately" (True Tiger Remix) – 4:12
4. "Lately" (Sunship 2 Step Remix) – 4:48
5. "Lately" (Bros Rise Remix) – 3:01
6. "Lately" (Ruff Loaderz Club Remix) – 5:59
7. " Lately" DJ Alexia (Alexia'Lately Remix)v- 3:40

== Charts ==
| Chart (2010) | Peak position |
|---|---|
| Japan (Japan Hot 100) | 75 |
| US Billboard Hot Dance Club Play | 8 |
