= Marlisa Punzalan =

Australian singer (born 1999)

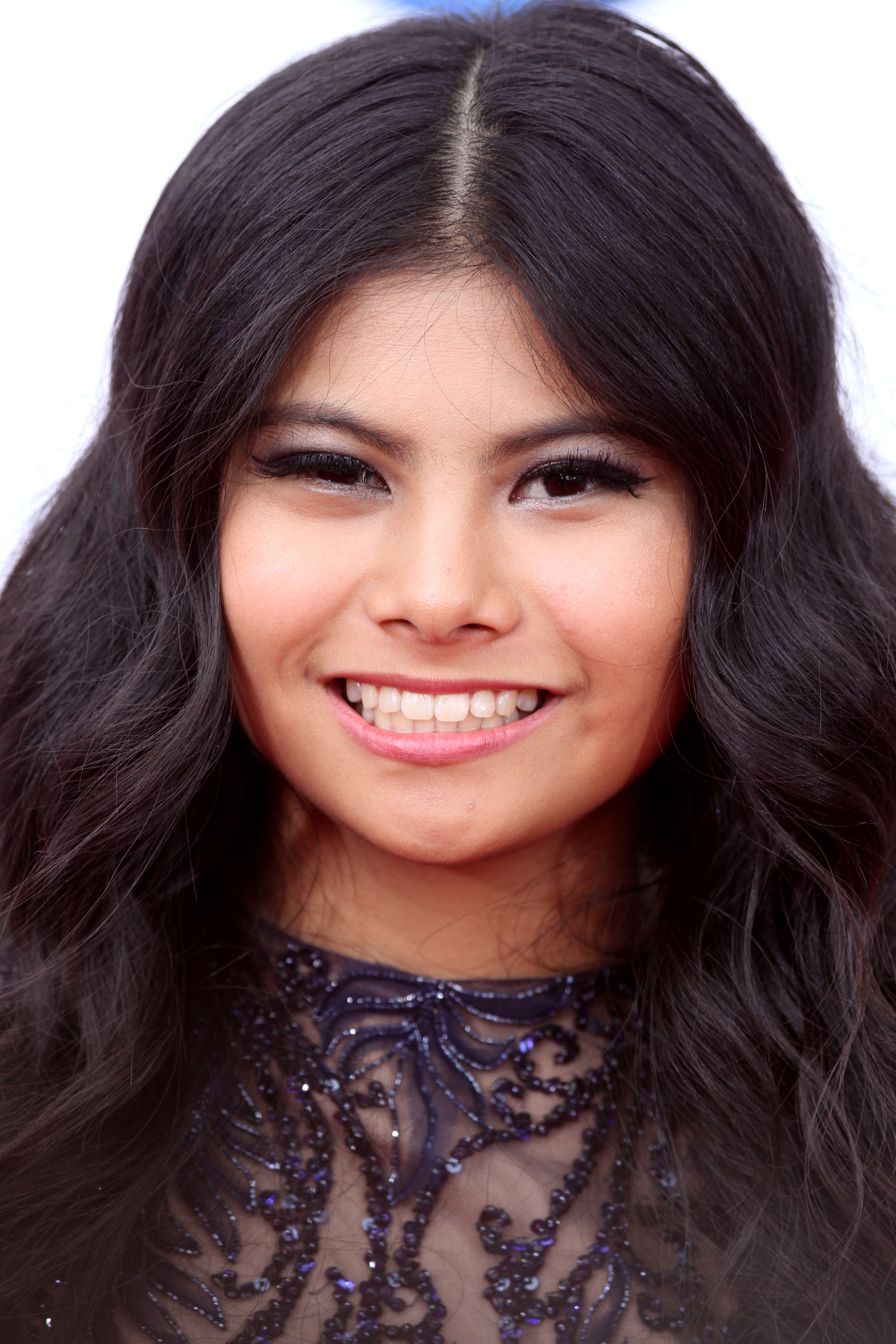
- Punzalan at the 2014 ARIA Music Awards

Background information
- Born: Marlisa Ann Punzalan; 1 October 1999 (age 27); Sydney
- Genre: Pop
- Occupation: Singer
- Instruments: Vocals; piano
- Years active: 2013–present
- Labels: Sony (2013-2017), ABS-CBN Film (2018-2019), Osetero Limited (2022-present)
- Website: www.marlisaofficial.com

Marlisa Ann Punzalan (born 1 October 1999), also known simply as Marlisa, is an Australian singer. She won the sixth season of The X Factor Australia in 2014, aged 15, the youngest contestant to have won the show. Punzalan subsequently received a recording contract with Sony Music Australia and released her debut single "Stand by You", which debuted at number two on the ARIA Singles Chart and was certified platinum by the Australian Recording Industry Association. This was followed by the release of her self-titled debut album Marlisa, which debuted at number six the ARIA Albums Chart and was certified gold. "Stand by You" was nominated for the ARIA Award for Song of the Year in 2015.

== Early life ==
Marlisa Ann Punzalan was born on 1 October 1999 in Sydney to Lito and Andrea Punzalan. Her parents emigrated to Australia from the Philippines before she and her older brother Martin were born. Punzalan lives at Gledenning, Sydney. She began singing at the age of three. In 2013, Punzalan auditioned for the seventh series of Australia's Got Talent but did not make it past the audition rounds, and also attempted to audition for the first series of The Voice Kids, but exceeded the age limit by one month. Before entering the sixth season of The X Factor Australia in 2014, Punzalan was a student at Mercy Catholic College in Chatswood and a regular performer at charity events, eisteddfods and RSL competitions. After becoming the winner of the sixth series, Punzalan left high school to become homeschooled and focus on her music career.

== Career ==
=== 2014: The X Factor Australia ===
In 2014, Punzalan successfully auditioned for the sixth season of The X Factor Australia, singing "Yesterday" by The Beatles. She received a standing ovation and four yesses from all four judges and progressed to the super bootcamp round of the competition. For the first bootcamp challenge, Punzalan was placed into a group with three other contestants from the Girls category to perform a song together for the judges. Punzalan made it to the second bootcamp challenge, where she performed "Never Be the Same" by Jessica Mauboy to the judges and a live audience of one thousand. She then progressed to the home visits round in New York City and performed "I'll Stand by You" by The Pretenders in front of her mentor Ronan Keating and guest mentor John Legend. Keating later selected Punzalan, along with Sydnee Carter and Caitlyn Shadbolt, for the live finals—a series of eleven weekly live shows in which contestants are progressively eliminated by public vote.

After the eliminations of Carter in week five and Shadbolt in week nine, Punzalan became the last remaining contestant in Keating's category. During the semi-final week, she landed in the bottom two for the first time with Reigan Derry and performed John Farnham's version of The Beatles' "Help!" in the final showdown. After the judges' vote went to deadlock, it was revealed that Punzalan received the most public votes and was put through to the grand final. During the grand final decider show on 20 October 2014, Punzalan was announced as the winner of the sixth season, becoming the first contestant from the Girls category to win.

==== Performances on The X Factor ====
Show	Theme	Song	Original artist(s)	Order	Result
Audition	Free choice	"Yesterday"	The Beatles	N/A	Through to super bootcamp
Super bootcamp 1	Group performance	"Burn"	Ellie Goulding	N/A	Through to super bootcamp 2
Super bootcamp 2	Solo performance	"Never Be the Same"	Jessica Mauboy	N/A	Through to home visits
Home visits	Free choice	"I'll Stand by You"	The Pretenders	N/A	Through to live shows
Week 1	Judges' Choice	"All by Myself"	Celine Dion	8	Safe
Week 2	Legends	"Paparazzi"	Lady Gaga	8	Safe
Week 3	Decades Challenge	"Hopelessly Devoted to You"	Olivia Newton-John	10	Safe
Week 4	Top 10 Hits	"It's Oh So Quiet"	Björk	3	Safe
Week 5	Latest and Greatest	"Let It Go"	Idina Menzel	1	Safe (5th)
Week 6	Rock	"Nothing Else Matters"	Metallica	4	Safe
Week 7	Judges' Challenge	"Try"	Pink	2	Safe
Week 8	Aussie Week	"Super Love"	Dami Im	4	Safe
Week 9	Killer Tracks and Curveballs	"Titanium"	David Guetta featuring Sia	2	Safe
Week 9	Killer Tracks and Curveballs	"Somewhere Over the Rainbow"	Judy Garland	6	Safe
Week 10 (Semi-final)	Power and Passion	"Girl on Fire"	Alicia Keys	2	Bottom two (3rd)
Week 10 (Semi-final)	Power and Passion	"Impossible"	Shontelle	6	Bottom two (3rd)
Week 10 (Semi-final)	Final showdown	"Help!"	The Beatles	2	Saved via deadlock
Week 11 (Grand Final)	Audition song	"Yesterday"	The Beatles	1	Safe
Week 11 (Grand Final)	Duet	"Never Be the Same" (with Jessica Mauboy)	Jessica Mauboy	8	Safe
Week 11 (Grand Final)	Winner's single	"Stand by You"	Punzalan	5	Safe
Week 11 (Grand Final)	Best Moment	"Titanium"	David Guetta featuring Sia	1	Winner

=== 2014–2017: Marlisa ===
After winning The X Factor, Punzalan's debut and winner's single "Stand by You" was made available to download on the iTunes Store. She also received a recording contract with Sony Music Australia. Four days after release, "Stand by You" debuted at number two on the ARIA Singles Chart. It was certified platinum by the Australian Recording Industry Association for sales exceeding 70,000 copies. "Stand by You" also peaked at number seven on the Singapore Singles Chart and number 21 on the New Zealand Singles Chart. An official YouTube audio of "Stand by You" published on the same day of the winner announcement help garnered interest on the single which triggered the debut at number 29 on the Billboard Twitter Real-Time Emerging Artists Chart. Punzalan's self-titled debut album, Marlisa, was released on 7 November 2014 and features studio recordings of selected songs she performed on The X Factor. It debuted at number six on the ARIA Albums Chart and number 11 on the New Zealand Albums Chart. The album was certified gold by the ARIA for shipments of more than 35,000 units and was the 83rd best-selling album of 2014 in Australia.

In late 2014, Punzalan performed two concerts at Rooty Hill RSL Club to thank her local fans. In December 2014, Punzalan and other Australian singers recorded a cover version of Kate Bush's "This Woman's Work" under the name "Hope for Isla and Jude", and released it as a charity single to help raise funds for two siblings who suffer from the rare disease Sanfilippo syndrome. Their version debuted at number 79 on the ARIA Singles Chart. To celebrate the Philippines' 117th Independence Day, Punzalan released a Filipino version of her second single "Unstoppable" in the Philippines on 12 June 2015. Her third single "Forever Young" was released on 6 November 2015. In 2017, it was speculated that Punzalan had been dropped by record company Sony Music. She is no longer listed as an artist on the company website.

=== 2018-2021: Brave ===
In June 2018, Marlisa released "Thank You", her first single in two and a half years, on the ABS-CBN Film Productions label.

In March 2019, Marlisa released her second studio album, titled Brave.

=== 2022-present: cover EPs ===
In 2022, Marlisa signed with Osetero Limited and has since released several cover EPs.

== Artistry ==
Aside from singing, Punzalan also plays the piano. She cites Eva Cassidy and Jessica Mauboy as her musical influences.

== Discography ==
=== Studio albums ===
List of studio albums, with selected chart positions and certifications
Title	Album details	Peak chart positions		Certifications
Title	Album details	AUS	NZ	Certifications
Marlisa	Released: 7 November 2014; Label: Sony Music Australia; Formats: CD, digital download	6	11	ARIA: Gold
Brave	Released: 15 March 2019; Label: ABS-CBN Film Productions; Formats: Digital download, streaming	—	—	

=== Extended plays ===
List of EPs, with selected details
Title	Details
Volume One	Released: 3 June 2022; Format: digital; Label: Ostereo
Volume Two	Released: 22 June 2022; Format: digital; Label: Ostereo
Volume Three	Released: 18 November 2022; Format: digital; Label: Ostereo
Volume Four	Released: 9 December 2022; Format: digital; Label: Ostereo
Volume Five	Released: 2 March 2023; Format: digital; Label: Ostereo
Volume Six	Released: 17 March 2023; Format: digital; Label: Ostereo
Volume Seven	Released: 8 September 2023; Format: digital; Label: Ostereo

=== Singles ===
List of singles, with selected chart positions and certifications
Title	Year	Peak chart positions			Certifications	Album
Title	Year	AUS	NZ	SIN	Certifications	Album
"Stand by You"	2014	2	21	7	ARIA: Platinum	Marlisa
"Unstoppable"	2015	—	—	—		Non-album singles
"Forever Young"	2015	72	—	—		Non-album singles
"Thank You"	2018	—	—	—		Brave
"Steel" (with Moophs)	2018	—	—	—		Brave
"Brave" (featuring Markus)	2019	—	—	—		Brave
"You Are the Reason"	2023	—	—	—		Non-album single
"—" denotes a single that did not chart or was not released in that country.

=== Other charted songs ===
List of non-single songs, with selected chart positions
Title	Year	Peak chart positions
Title	Year	AUS
"Nothing Else Matters"	2014	87
"Somewhere Over the Rainbow"	2014	93
"Titanium"	2014	96
"Yesterday"	2014	67

=== Music videos ===
List of music videos
Title	Year	Director(s)
"Stand by You"	2014	

== Awards and nominations ==
Year	Type	Award	Result
2015	ARIA Music Awards	Song of the Year ("Stand by You")	Nominated

Preceded by Dami Im	The X Factor (Australia); Winner; 2014	Succeeded by Cyrus Villanueva
