= The X Factor (Australian TV series) season 6 =

The X Factor
- Season 6
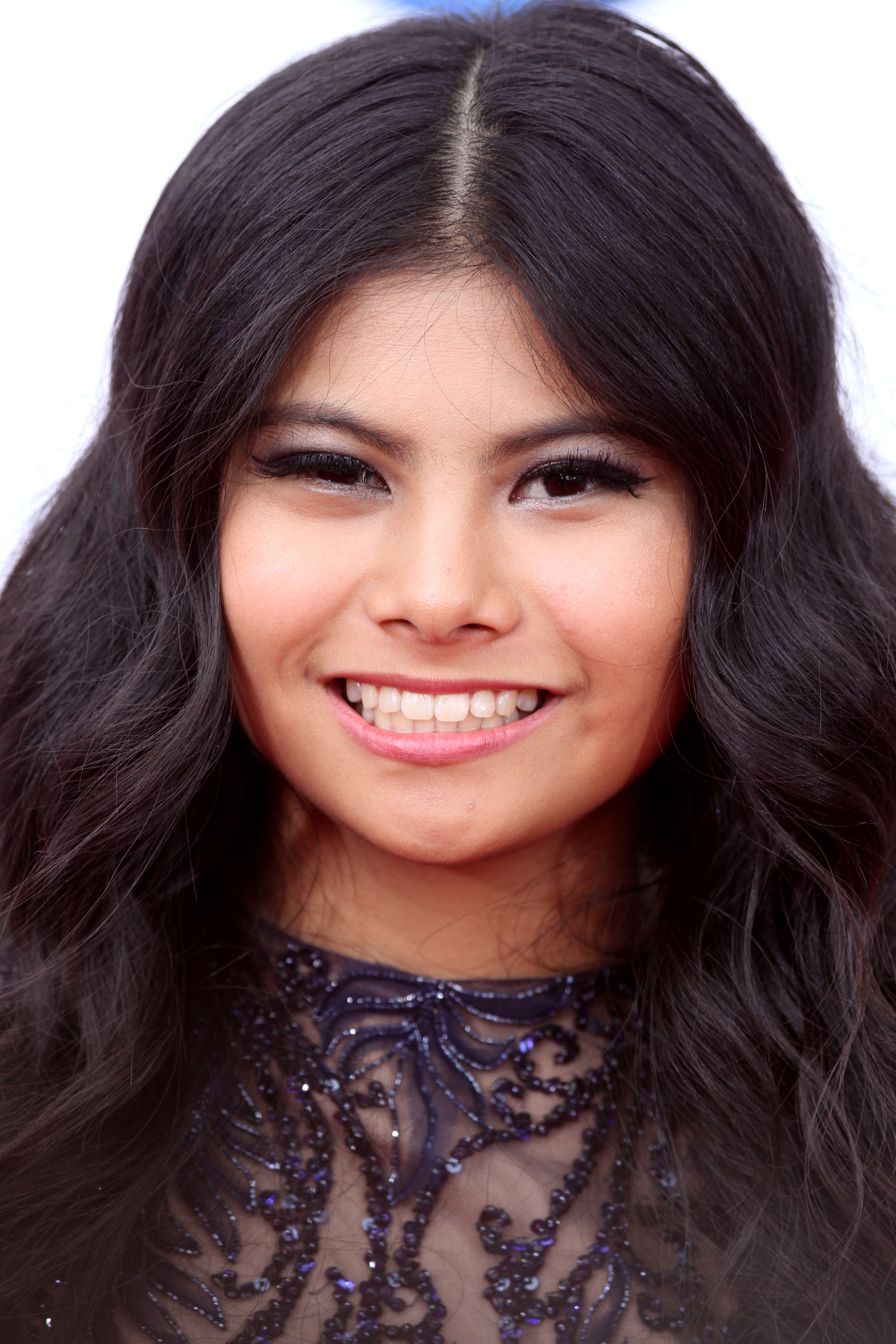
- Hosted by: Luke Jacobz (The X Factor)
- Judges: Dannii Minogue; Redfoo; Natalie Bassingthwaighte; Ronan Keating
- Winner: Marlisa Punzalan
- Winning mentor: Ronan Keating
- Runner-up: Dean Ray

Release
- Original network: Seven Network
- Original release: 13 July – 20 October 2014

Season chronology
- ← Previous; Season 5 Next → Season 7

The X Factor was an Australian television reality music competition, based on the original UK series, to find new singing talent; the winner of which received a Sony Music Australia recording contract. Season 6 premiered on the Seven Network on 13 July 2014 and ended on 20 October 2014. Luke Jacobz returned as host, while Dannii Minogue, Redfoo, Natalie Bassingthwaighte and Ronan Keating returned as judges. Comedy duo Luke & Wyatt joined the sixth season as the hosts of the online spin-off show The Fan Factor. The winner was Marlisa Punzalan and her winner's single "Stand by You" was released after the final. Punzalan became the youngest winner of the show at 15 years old and was the first contestant from the Girls category to do so. She was mentored by Keating, who won as mentor for the second time after previously mentoring season two winner Altiyan Childs in 2010.

Open auditions in front of the show's producers took place in 13 cities from November 2013 to January 2014. The successful auditionees chosen by the producers were then invited back to the last set of auditions that took place in front of the judges and a live studio audience in April 2014. Following auditions was super bootcamp, where all four judges worked together and collectively chose 24 acts, including six from each of the four categories: Boys, Girls, Over 25s and Groups. After super bootcamp was the home visits round, where each judge reduced their six acts to three, with assistance from guest mentors James Blunt, John Legend, Jennifer Lopez, Jessica Mauboy and Nicole Scherzinger. The live shows began on 10 August 2014. This was the first season of The X Factor Australia to feature a wildcard in the live shows as the thirteenth contestant.

== Judges ==
Season 6 judges

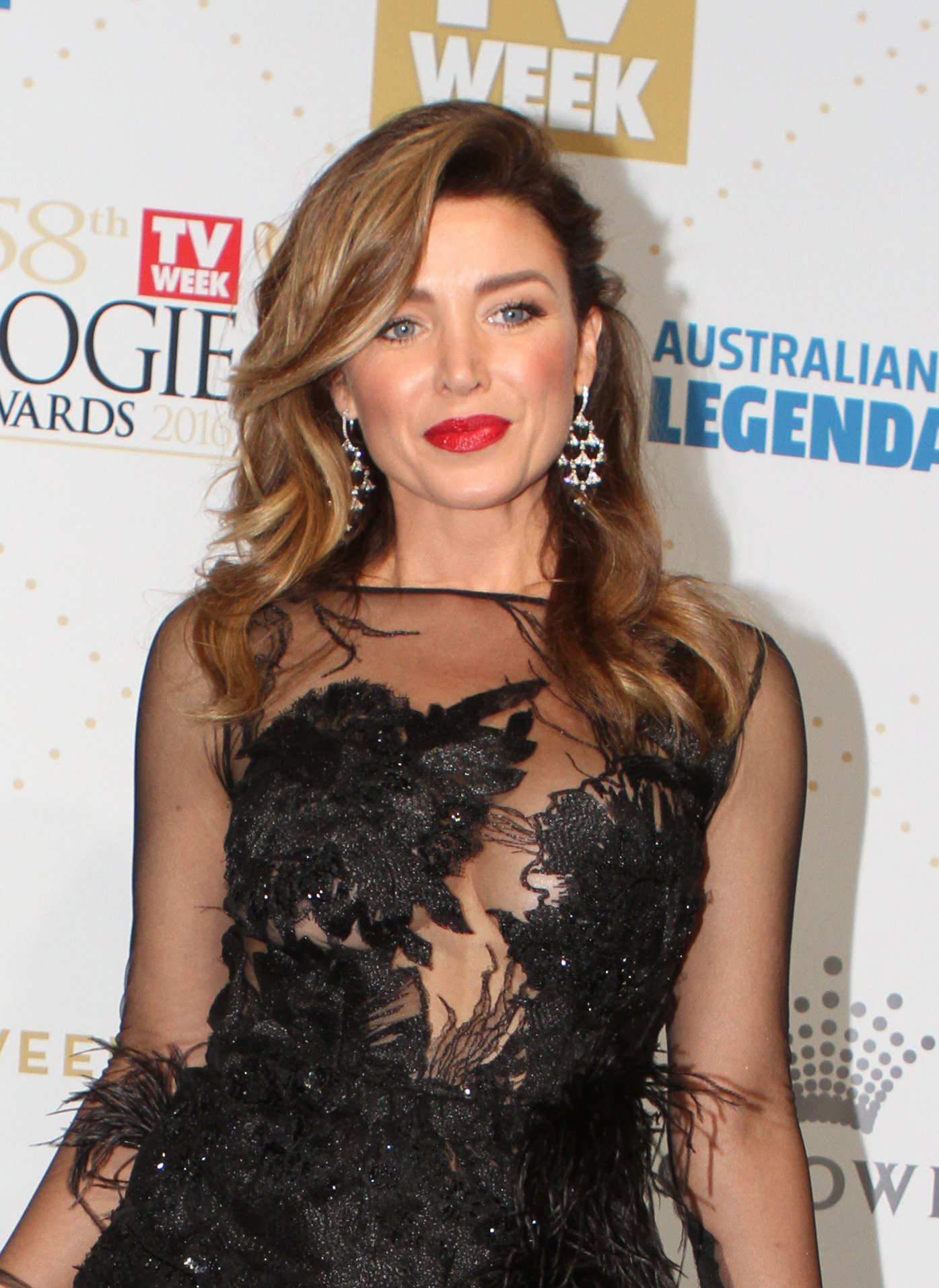
Dannii Minogue

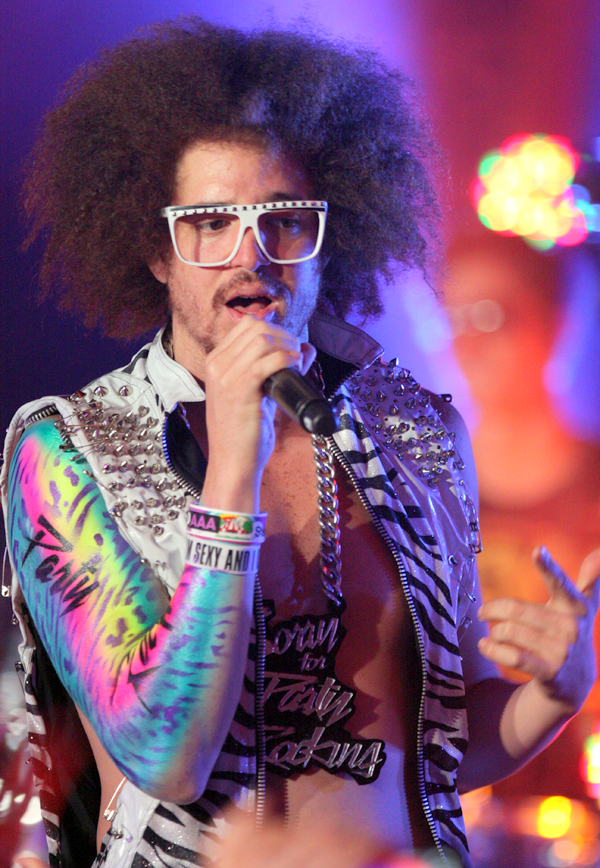
Redfoo

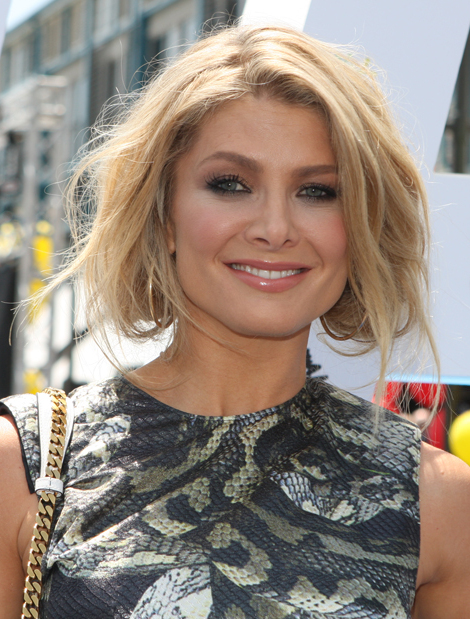
Natalie Bassingthwaighte

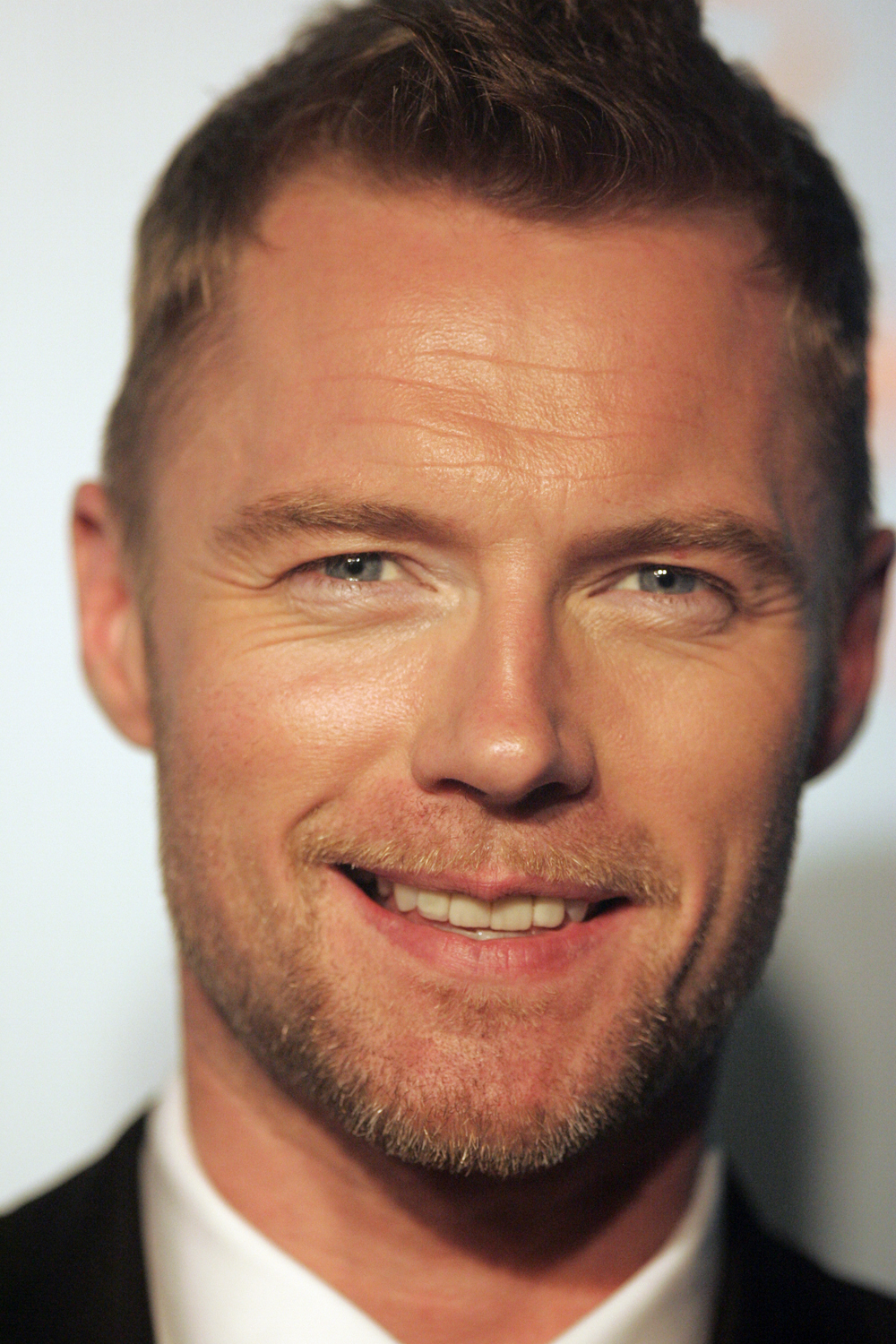
Ronan Keating

After the previous season concluded, the show confirmed that Keating, Redfoo, Bassingthwaighte and Minogue will all return for this season. Additionally, Minogue's confirmation on 24 February 2014, meant she would not return as a judge to the UK show for the 2014 UK series to replace Nicole Scherzinger despite popular demand in the UK for her to return to UK show in 2014. Scherzinger was eventually replaced by former judge Mel B.

== Selection process ==
=== Auditions ===
Open auditions in front of the show's producers took place in 13 cities and ran from November 2013 to January 2014. Online and DVD auditions were also held for those who could not attend the open auditions. The auditionees chosen by the producers were invited back to the last set of auditions that took place in front of the judges and a live studio audience. These auditions were filmed at the Hisense Arena in Melbourne on 4, 5 and 6 April, and at the Qantas Credit Union Arena in Sydney on 9, 10, 11 and 12 April.

Open auditions
City	Dates	Venue
Canberra	7 November 2013	Rydges Lakeside Canberra
Adelaide	9 November 2013	AAMI Stadium
Newcastle	13 November 2013	Hunter Stadium
Cairns	19 November 2013	Shangri-La Hotel, The Marina
Darwin	21 November 2013	The Hilton Hotel
Brisbane	23–24 November 2013	Suncorp Stadium
Mackay	26 November 2013	Central QLD Conservatorium of Music
Coffs Harbour	3 December 2013	Opal Cove Resort
Albury	5 December 2013	Albury Entertainment Centre
Melbourne	7–9 December 2013	Flemington Racecourse
Bunbury	16 January 2014	Quality Hotel Lord Forrest
Perth	18–19 January 2014	Parmelia Hilton
Sydney	24–26 January 2014	Australian Technology Park

Judges' auditions
City	Dates	Venue
Melbourne	4–6 April 2014	Hisense Arena
Sydney	9–12 April 2014	Qantas Credit Union Arena

=== Super bootcamp ===
The super bootcamp stage of the competition was held at The Star in Pyrmont, New South Wales. Filming began in late April 2014. The first day of bootcamp saw judges Ronan Keating, Natalie Bassingthwaighte, Redfoo and Dannii Minogue split each category into collaborations. The male and female soloists were put into ensembles of four within their category, the Over 25s were put into ensembles of three, and the acts from the Groups category were put into pairs. Each collaboration was given a list of songs which they had to choose from and only had 24 hours to rehearse. On the second day, each collaboration performed their chosen song for the judges. At the end of the day, a select group of soloists from the Boys and Girls categories were first requested by the judges to return to the stage to form a boy band (consisting of Ellis Hall, Harry Target and Joel Watson) and a girl group (consisting of Serenity, Tahnie Cristini, Chaska Halliday and Nada Leigh Nasser). The judges then sent home half of the 100 acts.

On the third day, each judge found out which category they would be mentoring, and the remaining 48 acts each had a one-on-one mentoring session with their mentor. Bassingthwaighte was given the Boys, Keating was given the Girls, Redfoo was given the Over 25s and Minogue was given the Groups category. On the fourth day, each act individually performed one song to the judges and a live audience of one thousand. On the fifth and final day of bootcamp, the judges revealed which acts they put through to home visits.

The 24 successful acts were:

- Boys: Jaymie Deboucherville, James Johnston, Adrien Nookadu, Dean Ray, Tee, Jesse Teinaki
- Girls: Alice Bottomley, Sydnee Carter, Shanell Dargan, Chloe Papandrea, Marlisa Punzalan, Caitlyn Shadbolt
- Over 25s: Reigan Derry, Jason Heerah, Ryan Imlach, Rochelle Pitt, Stephanie Totino, Amali Ward
- Groups: Brothers3, MajikHoney, Paris Inc., Trill, XOX, Younger Than Yesterday

=== Home visits and wildcards ===
The final round of the selection process, the home visits, saw each judge take their remaining six acts to exclusive locations around the world. Bassingthwaighte and Keating took the Boys and Girls to New York City, Redfoo took the Over 25s to Las Vegas, and Minogue took the Groups to an exclusive location in Sydney. On the first day, each act had a one-on-one mentoring session with their mentor. Minogue was assisted by Jessica Mauboy during the mentoring sessions for the Groups. On the second day of home visits, each act performed one song to their mentor and guest mentor. Bassingthwaighte was assisted by American Idol judge Jennifer Lopez, Keating was assisted by John Legend, Redfoo was assisted by former X Factor UK judge Nicole Scherzinger (who got replaced by Mel B as of UK Series 11) and Minogue was assisted by James Blunt. After the performances, the judges along with their guest mentors, narrowed down the acts to three each. On the third and final day, the judges revealed which acts they put through to the live shows.

Key:

– Wildcard winner

Summary of home visits
Judge	Category	Location	Assistant(s)	Contestants eliminated	Wildcards
Bassingthwaighte	Boys	New York City	Jennifer Lopez	Jaymie Deboucherville, James Johnston	Jesse Teinaki
Keating	Girls	New York City	John Legend	Shanell Dargan, Chloe Papandrea	Alice Bottomley
Redfoo	Over 25s	Las Vegas	Nicole Scherzinger	Stephanie Totino, Amali Ward	Ryan Imlach
Minogue	Groups	Sydney	Jessica Mauboy; James Blunt	MajikHoney, Paris Inc.	Brothers3

At the end of home visits, it was announced that each judge could bring back one eliminated act from their category, who did not make the top twelve, as their wildcard. Bassingthwaighte chose Jesse Teinaki, Keating chose Alice Bottomley, Redfoo chose Ryan Imlach, and Minogue chose Brothers3. The public then voted for which of the four wildcards would become the thirteenth contestant. Brothers3 were announced as the wildcard winners during the first live show on 10 August 2014.

== Acts ==
Key:

– Winner
– Runner-Up
– Wildcard (Live Shows)

Act	Age(s)	Hometown	Category (mentor)	Result
Marlisa Punzalan	15	Glendenning, New South Wales	Girls (Keating)	Winner
Dean Ray	22	Narromine, New South Wales	Boys (Bassingthwaighte)	Runner-Up
Brothers3	16–18	Mudgee	Groups (Minogue)	3rd Place
Reigan Derry	26	Maida Vale, Western Australia	Over 25s (Redfoo)	4th Place
Caitlyn Shadbolt	19	Gympie, Queensland	Girls (Keating)	5th Place
Jason Heerah	31	Melbourne, Victoria	Over 25s (Redfoo)	6th Place
Tee	24	Sydney, New South Wales	Boys (Bassingwaighte)	7th Place
Rochelle Pitt	41	Cairns, Queensland	Over 25s (Redfoo)	8th Place
Sydnee Carter	16	Wanneroo	Girls (Keating)	9th Place
XOX	18–21	Various	Groups (Minogue)	10th Place
Adrian Nookadu	17	Sydney, New South Wales	Boys (Bassingthwaighte)	11th Place
Younger Than Yesterday	16	Various	Groups (Minogue)	12th Place
Trill	14–15	Various	Groups (Minogue)	13th Place

== Live shows ==
=== Results summary ===
Colour key

Act in Team Dannii
Act in Team Redfoo
Act in Team Natalie Bassingthwaighte
Act in Team Ronan

– Act with the most votes
– Act in the bottom two or three and had to perform in the final showdown
– Act received the fewest public votes and was automatically eliminated

Weekly results per act
Act	Week 1	Week 2	Week 3	Week 4	Week 5^{2}	Week 6	Week 7^{4}	Week 8	Quarter-Final	Semi-Final	Final	
Act	Week 1	Week 2	Week 3	Week 4	Week 5^{2}	Week 6	Week 7^{4}	Week 8	Quarter-Final	Semi-Final	Sunday Vote	Monday Vote
Marlisa Punzalan	Safe	Safe	Safe	Safe	5th	Safe	Safe	Safe	Safe	3rd	Safe	Winner
Dean Ray	Safe	Safe	Safe	Safe	2nd	Safe	Safe	Safe	Bottom Two	Safe	Safe	Runner-Up
Brothers3	Safe	Safe	Safe	Safe	1st	Safe	Safe	Safe	Safe	Safe	3rd	Eliminated (Final)
Reigan Derry	Safe	Safe	Safe	Safe	3rd	Safe	Safe	5th	Safe	4th	Eliminated (Semi-Final)	
Caitlyn Shadbolt	Safe	Safe	Safe	Safe	6th	7th	Bottom Three	Safe	Bottom Two	Eliminated (Quarter-Final)		
Jason Heerah	Safe	Safe	Safe	Safe	Bottom Two	Safe	Bottom Three	6th	Eliminated (Week 8)			
Tee	Safe	Safe	Safe	Bottom Two	7th	Safe	Bottom Three	Eliminated (Week 7)				
Rochelle Pitt	Safe	Safe	Safe	Safe	4th	8th	Eliminated (Week 6)					
Sydnee Carter	Safe	Safe	10th	Safe	Bottom Two	Eliminated (Week 5)						
XOX	Safe	Bottom Two	Safe	Bottom Two	Eliminated (Week 4)							
Adrien Nookadu	Bottom Two	Safe	11th	Eliminated (Week 3)								
Younger Than Yesterday	Safe	Bottom Two	Eliminated (Week 2)									
Trill	Bottom Two	Eliminated (Week 1)										
Final Showdown	Trill, Nookadu	XOX, Younger Than Yesterday	Carter, Nookadu	XOX, Tee	Carter, Heerah	Shadbolt, Pitt	Shadbolt, Tee, Heerah	Heerah, Derry	Shadbolt, Ray	Derry, Punzalan	No final showdown/judges' vote; public votes alone decide who wins	
Judges voted to	Eliminate									Send Through	No final showdown/judges' vote; public votes alone decide who wins	
Keating's vote (Girls)	Trill	Younger Than Yesterday	Nookadu	XOX	Heerah	Pitt	Tee	Heerah	Ray	Punzalan	No final showdown/judges' vote; public votes alone decide who wins	
Bassingthwaighte's vote (Boys)	Trill	Younger Than Yesterday	Carter	XOX	Carter	—N/a^{3}	Shadbolt	Heerah	Shadbolt	Derry	No final showdown/judges' vote; public votes alone decide who wins	
Minogue's vote (Groups)	Nookadu	—N/a^{1}	Carter	Tee	Carter	None (abstained)	Shadbolt	Derry	Shadbolt	Punzalan	No final showdown/judges' vote; public votes alone decide who wins	
Redfoo's vote (Over 25s)	Trill	Younger Than Yesterday	Nookadu	XOX	Carter	Shadbolt	Tee	Derry	Shadbolt	Derry	No final showdown/judges' vote; public votes alone decide who wins	
Eliminated	Trill; 3 of 4 votes Majority	Younger Than Yesterday; 3 of 3 votes Majority	Adrien Nookadu; 2 of 4 votes Deadlock	XOX; 3 of 4 votes Majority	Sydnee Carter; 3 of 4 votes Majority	Rochelle Pitt; 1 of 2 votes Deadlock^{3}	Tee; 2 of 4 votes Deadlock	Jason Heerah; 2 of 4 votes Deadlock	Caitlyn Shadbolt; 3 of 4 votes Majority	Reigan Derry; 2 of 4 votes Deadlock	Brothers3; Public Vote To Win	Dean Ray; Public Vote To Win

Notes

- ^{1} Minogue was not required to vote as there was already a majority.
- ^{2} For the first time in the show's history and only for week five, the positions of the public votes were revealed in the order that the public voted based on the live performances that week.
- ^{3} Bassingthwaighte was absent for the week six showdown. As a result, three unanimous votes were required for an act to be eliminated. However, as Redfoo and Keating voted to save their own acts, Minogue abstained and the public vote was counted, resulting in Pitt's elimination.
- ^{4} For the first time in the show's history and only for week seven, a bottom three was featured.

=== Live show details ===
==== Week 1 (10/11 August) ====
- Theme: Judges' choice
- Group performance: "Geronimo"
- Celebrity performers: Dami Im ("Gladiator") and Guy Sebastian ("Come Home With Me")

Acts' performances on the first live show
Act	Category (mentor)	Order	Song	Result
Jason Heerah	Over 25s (Redfoo)	1	"Sing"	Safe
Tee	Boys (Bassingthwaighte)	2	"Love Me Again"	Safe
Sydnee Carter	Girls (Keating)	3	"Don't Panic"	Safe
Younger Than Yesterday	Groups (Minogue)	4	"Somebody to You"	Safe
Rochelle Pitt	Over 25s (Redfoo)	5	"History Repeating"	Safe
Trill	Groups (Minogue)	6	"I Will Never Let You Down"	Bottom Two
Adrien Nookadu	Boys (Bassingthwaighte)	7	"Stupid Love"	Bottom Two
Marlisa Punzalan	Girls (Keating)	8	"All by Myself"	Safe
Brothers3	Groups (Minogue)	9	"Just the Way You Are"	Safe
Caitlyn Shadbolt	Girls (Keating)	10	"Days Go By"	Safe
XOX	Groups (Minogue)	11	"Braveheart"	Safe
Dean Ray	Boys (Bassingthwaighte)	12	"Sympathy for the Devil"	Safe
Reigan Derry	Over 25s (Redfoo)	13	"Unconditionally"	Safe
Final showdown details
Act	Category (mentor)	Order	Song	Result
Trill	Groups (Minogue)	1	"Leave (Get Out)"	Eliminated
Adrien Nookadu	Boys (Bassingthwaighte)	2	"When I Was Your Man"	Safe

Judges' vote to eliminate

- Redfoo: Trill – based his decision on the live performance and final showdown performances and who really wanted it more.
- Minogue: Adrien Nookadu – backed her own act, Trill.
- Bassingthwaighte: Trill – backed her own act, Adrien Nookadu.
- Keating: Trill – went with his gut.

Notes

- On 16 August 2014, Brothers3's performance of "Just the Way You Are" debuted at number 99 on the ARIA Singles Chart. The following week, it moved up to a new peak of number 98.

==== Week 2 (17/18 August) ====
- Theme: Legends
- Group performance: "Get the Girl Back" and "MMMBop" with Hanson
- Celebrity performers: Ella Henderson ("Ghost") and G.R.L. ("Ugly Heart")

Acts' performances on the second live show
Act	Category (mentor)	Order	Song	Legend	Result
XOX	Groups (Minogue)	1	"Last Friday Night (T.G.I.F.)"	Katy Perry	Bottom Two
Adrien Nookadu	Boys (Bassingthwaighte)	2	"Like I Love You"	Justin Timberlake	Safe
Sydnee Carter	Girls (Keating)	3	"Live and Let Die"	Paul McCartney and Wings	Safe
Rochelle Pitt	Over 25s (Redfoo)	4	"Gimme Shelter"	The Rolling Stones	Safe
Reigan Derry	Over 25s (Redfoo)	5	"Toxic"	Britney Spears	Safe
Dean Ray	Boys (Bassingthwaighte)	6	"Janie's Got a Gun"	Aerosmith	Safe
Younger Than Yesterday	Groups (Minogue)	7	"One Way or Another"	Blondie	Bottom Two
Marlisa Punzalan	Girls (Keating)	8	"Paparazzi"	Lady Gaga	Safe
Caitlyn Shadbolt	Girls (Keating)	9	"Blaze of Glory"	Jon Bon Jovi	Safe
Tee	Boys (Bassingthwaighte)	10	"Hey Jude"	The Beatles	Safe
Jason Heerah	Over 25s (Redfoo)	11	"Working Day and Night"	Michael Jackson	Safe
Brothers3	Groups (Minogue)	12	"Always on My Mind"	Elvis Presley	Safe
Final showdown details
Act	Category (mentor)	Order	Song		Result
XOX	Groups (Minogue)	1	"Nobody's Perfect"		Safe
Younger Than Yesterday	Groups (Minogue)	2	"On Top of the World"		Eliminated

Judges' vote to eliminate

- Redfoo: Younger Than Yesterday – based the decision on all performances so far.
- Keating: Younger Than Yesterday – stated that XOX had more to improve.
- Bassingthwaighte: Younger Than Yesterday – went with her gut.
- Minogue was not required to vote as there was already a majority and did not say how she would have voted as both acts were in her category.

Notes

- On 23 August 2014, Brothers3's performance of "Always on My Mind" debuted at number 73 on the ARIA Singles Chart.

==== Week 3 (24/25 August) ====
- Theme: Decades Challenge
- Group performance: "Boom Clap"
- Celebrity performers: Jimmy Barnes featuring Diesel ("I'd Die to Be with You Tonight") and Gabrielle Aplin ("Please Don't Say You Love Me")

Acts' performances on the third live show
Act	Category (mentor)	Order	Song	Decade	Result
Brothers3	Groups (Minogue)	1	"Happy Birthday Helen"	1990s	Safe
Caitlyn Shadbolt	Girls (Keating)	2	"Is She Really Going Out with Him?"	1970s	Safe
Rochelle Pitt	Over 25s (Redfoo)	3	"Nothing's Real but Love"	2010s	Safe
Tee	Boys (Bassingthwaighte)	4	"I Knew You Were Waiting (For Me)"	1980s	Safe
Sydnee Carter	Girls (Keating)	5	"Video Killed the Radio Star"	1970s	Bottom Two
Adrien Nookadu	Boys (Bassingthwaighte)	6	"I Just Can't Stop Loving You"	1980s	Bottom Two
XOX	Groups (Minogue)	7	"Groove Is in the Heart"	1990s	Safe
Dean Ray	Boys (Bassingthwaighte)	8	"Reckless"	1980s	Safe
Reigan Derry	Over 25s (Redfoo)	9	"Chandelier"	2010s	Safe
Marlisa Punzalan	Girls (Keating)	10	"Hopelessly Devoted to You"	1970s	Safe
Jason Heerah	Over 25s (Redfoo)	11	"Runaway Baby"	2010s	Safe
Final showdown details
Act	Category (mentor)	Order	Song		Result
Sydnee Carter	Girls (Keating)	1	"Hey Ya!"		Safe
Adrien Nookadu	Boys (Bassingthwaighte)	2	"I Can't Make You Love Me"		Eliminated

Judges' vote to eliminate

- Keating: Adrien Nookadu – backed his own act, Sydnee Carter.
- Bassingthwaighte: Sydnee Carter – backed her own act, Adrien Nookadu.
- Redfoo: Adrien Nookadu – saw a growth in Carter and wanted to see what else she could do.
- Minogue: Sydnee Carter – felt that Nookadu had more to succeed.

With the acts in the bottom two receiving two votes each, the result went to deadlock and reverted to the earlier public vote. Nookadu received the fewest votes and was eliminated.

Notes

- Each mentor was given a different decade to choose their remaining acts songs from, including the 70s, 80s, 90s and now.
- On 30 August 2014, the performances of four acts entered the ARIA Singles Chart. Dean Ray's performance of "Reckless" debuted at number 50, Sydnee Carter's performance of "Video Killed the Radio Star" debuted at number 63, Reigan Derry's performance of "Chandelier" debuted at number 81, and Brothers3's performance of "Happy Birthday Helen" debuted at number 86.

==== Week 4 (31 August/1 September) ====
- Theme: Top 10 Hits
- Group performance: "Army of Two"
- Celebrity performers: Redfoo ("New Thang") and Paloma Faith ("Only Love Can Hurt Like This")

Acts' performances on the fourth live show
Act	Category (mentor)	Order	Song	Result
Tee	Boys (Bassingthwaighte)	1	"Dedication to My Ex (Miss That)"	Bottom Two
Rochelle Pitt	Over 25s (Redfoo)	2	"Proud Mary"	Safe
Marlisa Punzalan	Girls (Keating)	3	"It's Oh So Quiet"	Safe
Reigan Derry	Over 25s (Redfoo)	4	"Stay with Me"	Safe
Brothers3	Groups (Minogue)	5	"Hey Brother"	Safe
Dean Ray	Boys (Bassingthwaighte)	6	"Mr. Brightside"	Safe
Sydnee Carter	Girls (Keating)	7	"Say Something"	Safe
Jason Heerah	Over 25s (Redfoo)	8	"Higher Ground"	Safe
XOX	Groups (Minogue)	9	"Problem"	Bottom Two
Caitlyn Shadbolt	Girls (Keating)	10	"Shake It Off"	Safe
Final showdown details
Act	Category (mentor)	Order	Song	Result
XOX	Groups (Minogue)	1	"Suit & Tie"	Eliminated
Tee	Boys (Bassingthwaighte)	2	"When a Man Loves a Woman"	Safe

Judges' vote to eliminate

- Keating: XOX – felt that Tee had more to develop.
- Bassingthwaighte: XOX – backed her own act, Tee.
- Minogue: Tee – backed her own act, XOX.
- Redfoo: XOX – stated that Tee could improve more.

Notes

- The songs for the remaining acts were chosen by the public.
- With XOX eliminated, Minogue had only one act (Brothers3) left in the competition. Minogue lost her third act within four weeks of the live shows, all of which were chosen as her top three for the live shows. Her remaining act Brothers3 were voted into the live shows as the wildcard.
- On 6 September 2014, the performances of four acts entered the ARIA Singles Chart. Reigan Derry's performance of "Stay with Me" debuted at number 20, Brothers3's performance of "Hey Brother" debuted at number 58, Sydnee Carter's performance of "Say Something" debuted at number 73, and Jason Heerah's performance of "Higher Ground" debuted at number 98. On 19 September 2014, Derry's performance debuted at number 28 on the New Zealand Singles Chart.

==== Week 5 (7/8 September) ====
- Theme: Latest and Greatest
- Group performance: "Jump (for My Love)"
- Celebrity performers: Hilary Duff ("All About You") and Ariana Grande ("Problem", "Bang Bang" and "Break Free")

Acnts' performances on the fifth live show
Act	Category (mentor)	Order	Song	Result
Marlisa Punzalan	Girls (Keating)	1	"Let It Go"	Safe (5th)
Brothers3	Groups (Minogue)	2	"Pompeii"	Safe (1st)
Tee	Boys (Bassingthwaighte)	3	"Hold On, We're Going Home"	Safe (7th)
Sydnee Carter	Girls (Keating)	4	"Strong"	Bottom Two
Rochelle Pitt	Over 25s (Redfoo)	5	"Rolling in the Deep"	Safe (4th)
Jason Heerah	Over 25s (Redfoo)	6	"She Came to Give It to You"	Bottom Two
Dean Ray	Boys (Bassingthwaighte)	7	"Budapest"	Safe (2nd)
Caitlyn Shadbolt	Girls (Keating)	8	"You and I"	Safe (6th)
Reigan Derry	Over 25s (Redfoo)	9	"Bang Bang"	Safe (3rd)
Final showdown details
Act	Category (mentor)	Order	Song	Result
Sydnee Carter	Girls (Keating)	1	"Little Talks"	Eliminated
Jason Heerah	Over 25s (Redfoo)	2	"Let's Get It On"	Safe

Judges' vote to eliminate

- Redfoo: Sydnee Carter – backed his own act, Jason Heerah.
- Keating: Jason Heerah – backed his own act, Sydnee Carter.
- Bassingthwaighte: Sydnee Carter – felt that she had not seen the best of Carter and complained about her lack of consistency.
- Minogue: Sydnee Carter – stated that Heerah had improved that week.

Notes

- During the live decider on Monday night, for the first time in the show's history, and only for one week, the safe contestants' names were called in descending order of the number of public votes they received.
- On 13 September 2014, the performances of three acts entered the ARIA Singles Chart. Dean Ray's performance of "Budapest" debuted at number 15, Reigan Derry's performance of "Bang Bang" debuted at number 53, and Brothers3's performance of "Pompeii" debuted at number 91. On 26 September 2014, Ray's performance debuted at number 29 on the New Zealand Singles Chart.

==== Week 6 (14/15 September) ====
- Theme: Rock
- Group performance: "Maps"
- Celebrity performers: Nathaniel Willemse ("Live Louder") and Meghan Trainor ("All About That Bass")

Acts' performances on the sixth live show
Act	Category (mentor)	Order	Song	Rock Artist	Result
Dean Ray	Boys (Bassingthwaighte)	1	"New Sensation"	INXS	Safe
Rochelle Pitt	Over 25s (Redfoo)	2	"Heavy Cross"	Gossip	Bottom Two
Tee	Boys (Bassingthwaighte)	3	"Don't Stop Me Now"	Queen	Safe
Marlisa Punzalan	Girls (Keating)	4	"Nothing Else Matters"	Metallica	Safe
Reigan Derry	Over 25s (Redfoo)	5	"Boys in Town"	Divinyls	Safe
Caitlyn Shadbolt	Girls (Keating)	6	"Closer to the Edge"	Thirty Seconds to Mars	Bottom Two
Jason Heerah	Over 25s (Redfoo)	7	"Seven Nation Army"	The White Stripes	Safe
Brothers3	Groups (Minogue)	8	"Every Teardrop Is a Waterfall"	Coldplay	Safe
Final showdown details
Act	Category (mentor)	Order	Song		Result
Caitlyn Shadbolt	Girls (Keating)	1	"Before the Worst"		Safe
Rochelle Pitt	Over 25s (Redfoo)	2	"Respect"		Eliminated

Judges' vote to eliminate

- Redfoo: Caitlyn Shadbolt – backed his own act, Rochelle Pitt.
- Keating: Rochelle Pitt – backed his own act, Caitlyn Shadbolt.
- Due to Bassingthwaighte's absence, three unanimous votes were required for an act to be eliminated. However, as Redfoo and Keating backed their own acts, Minogue was not required to vote and the result went to deadlock. Minogue refused to say who she would have voted to eliminate, implying she would have sent the result to deadlock if Bassingthwaighte was present.

With the acts in the bottom two receiving one vote each, the result went to deadlock and reverted to the earlier public vote. Pitt was eliminated as the act with the fewest public votes.

Notes

- Bassingthwaighte was absent for the live decider because she had attended the funeral of her manager Mark Byrne earlier that day.
- On 20 September 2014, the performances of two acts entered the ARIA Singles Chart. Marlisa Punzalan's performance of "Nothing Else Matters" debuted at number 87 and Dean Ray's performance of "New Sensation" debuted at number 90.

==== Week 7 (21/23 September) ====
- Theme: Judges' Challenge
- Group performance: "Best Day of My Life" with American Authors
- Celebrity performers: Ricki-Lee Coulter ("Happy Ever After") and American Authors ("Believer")

Acts' performances on the seventh live show
Act	Category (mentor)	Order	Song	Chosen by	Result
Brothers3	Groups (Minogue)	1	"I'm Gonna Be (500 Miles)"	Ronan Keating	Safe
Marlisa Punzalan	Girls (Keating)	2	"Try"	Redfoo	Safe
Reigan Derry	Over 25s (Redfoo)	3	"Dog Days Are Over"	Natalie Bassingthwaighte	Safe
Tee	Boys (Bassingthwaighte)	4	"When Doves Cry"	Ronan Keating	Bottom Three
Caitlyn Shadbolt	Girls (Keating)	5	"Still Into You"	Natalie Bassingthwaighte	Bottom Three
Dean Ray	Boys (Bassingthwaighte)	6	"Stolen Dance"	Redfoo	Safe
Jason Heerah	Over 25s (Redfoo)	7	"Latch"	Dannii Minogue	Bottom Three
Final showdown details
Act	Category (mentor)	Order	Song		Result
Caitlyn Shadbolt	Girls (Keating)	1	"Temporary Home"		Safe
Jason Heerah	Over 25s (Redfoo)	2	"We Can Work It Out"		Safe
Tee	Boys (Bassingthwaighte)	3	"You Are So Beautiful"		Eliminated

Judges' vote to eliminate

- Keating: Tee – Backed his own act, Caitlyn Shadbolt. Based on the performances from previous weeks, he chose to send home Tee.
- Bassingthwaighte: Caitlyn Shadbolt – Backed her own act, Tee. She chose to send home Shadbolt because she felt that Heerah had handled the different genres in each week better and had been more consistent.
- Minogue: Caitlyn Shadbolt – felt she was not as strong as Tee and Heerah.
- Redfoo: Tee – Backed his own act, Jason Heerah. Redfoo chose to send home Tee because he felt that Tee had not found himself as an artist yet.

With Shadbolt and Tee both receiving two votes each, Heerah was announced safe automatically and the result went to deadlock and reverted to the earlier public vote. Tee was eliminated as the act with the fewest public votes.

Notes

- This week's live decider aired on Tuesday night due to the Seven Network's coverage of the 2014 Brownlow Medal.
- For the first time in the show's history, and only for this week, the final showdown in the live decider consisted of a bottom three.
- On 27 September 2014, the performances of four acts entered the ARIA Singles Chart. Jason Heerah's performance of "Latch" debuted at number 38, Dean Ray's performance of "Stolen Dance" debuted at number 40, Reigan Derry's performance of "Dog Days Are Over" debuted at number 61, and Brothers3's performance of "I'm Gonna Be (500 Miles)" debuted at number 75.

==== Week 8 (28/29 September) ====
- Theme: Aussie Week
- Group performance: "I'm Ready" with AJR
- Celebrity performers: The Veronicas ("You Ruin Me") and Ed Sheeran ("Thinking Out Loud" and "Don't")

Acts' performances on the eighth live show
Act	Category (mentor)	Order	Song	Australian Musician	Result
Jason Heerah	Over 25s (Redfoo)	1	"Like It Like That"	Guy Sebastian	Bottom Two
Caitlyn Shadbolt	Girls (Keating)	2	"Bow River"	Cold Chisel	Safe
Reigan Derry	Over 25s (Redfoo)	3	"Burn for You"	John Farnham	Bottom Two
Marlisa Punzalan	Girls (Keating)	4	"Super Love"	Dami Im	Safe
Brothers3	Groups (Minogue)	5	"Amnesia"	5 Seconds of Summer	Safe
Dean Ray	Boys (Bassingthwaighte)	6	"Into My Arms"	Nick Cave and the Bad Seeds	Safe
Final showdown details
Act	Category (mentor)	Order	Song		Result
Jason Heerah	Over 25s (Redfoo)	1	"Never Tear Us Apart"		Eliminated
Reigan Derry	Over 25s (Redfoo)	2	"Stay"		Safe

Judges' vote to eliminate

- Keating: Jason Heerah – stated that it was a very tough decision.
- Bassingthwaighte: Jason Heerah – based on whose performances were downloaded on iTunes more.
- Minogue: Reigan Derry – based on whose final showdown performance had the most connection and moved her the most.
- Redfoo: Reigan Derry – could not send either of his own acts home and sent the result to deadlock.

With the acts in the bottom two receiving two votes each, the result went to deadlock and reverted to the earlier public vote. Heerah was eliminated as the act with the fewest public votes.

Notes

- Brothers3 became the first group to not land in the bottom two in week eight. All other groups since season two have passed week eight after surviving the bottom two.
- On 4 October 2014, the performances of two acts entered the ARIA Singles Chart. Dean Ray's performance of "Into My Arms" debuted at number 36, and Reigan Derry's performance of "Burn for You" debuted at number 78.

==== Week 9: Quarter-Final (5/6 October) ====
- Theme: Killer Tracks and Curveballs
- Group performance: "Am I Wrong" with Nico & Vinz
- Celebrity performers: Taylor Henderson ("Host of Angels") and Nico & Vinz ("In Your Arms")

Acts' performances in the quarter-final
Act	Category (mentor)	Order	Killer Track	Order	Curveball	Result
Dean Ray	Boys (Bassingthwaighte)	1	"Lonely Boy"	9	"Crying"	Bottom Two
Marlisa Punzalan	Girls (Keating)	2	"Titanium"	6	"Somewhere Over the Rainbow"	Safe
Reigan Derry	Over 25s (Redfoo)	10	"Only Girl (In the World)"	3	"Creep"	Safe
Brothers3	Groups (Minogue)	4	"The Sound of Silence"	7	"Que Sera"	Safe
Caitlyn Shadbolt	Girls (Keating)	5	"Before He Cheats"	8	"Will You Still Love Me Tomorrow"	Bottom Two
Final showdown details
Act	Category (mentor)	Order	Song			Result
Caitlyn Shadbolt	Girls (Keating)	1	"If I Die Young"			Eliminated
Dean Ray	Boys (Bassingthwaighte)	2	"Hurt"			Safe

Judges' vote to eliminate

- Keating: Dean Ray – backed his own act, Caitlyn Shadbolt.
- Redfoo: Caitlyn Shadbolt – went with his gut and based on whose performances were more consistent.
- Bassingthwaighte: Caitlyn Shadbolt – backed her own act, Dean Ray.
- Minogue: Caitlyn Shadbolt – based her decision on the number of standing ovations Ray had received.

Notes

- On 11 October 2014, the performances of three acts entered the ARIA Singles Chart. Dean Ray's performances of "Crying" and "Lonely Boy" debuted at numbers 26 and 99 respectively, Brothers3's performances of "Que Sera" and "The Sound of Silence" debuted at numbers 42 and 48 respectively, and Marlisa Punzalan's performances of "Somewhere Over the Rainbow" and "Titanium" debuted at numbers 93 and 96 respectively.

==== Week 10: Semi-Final (12/13 October) ====
- Theme: Power and Passion
- Group performance: "Reach Out I'll Be There" / "You Can't Hurry Love" with Boyzone
- Celebrity performers: The Script ("Superheroes") and 5 Seconds of Summer ("Amnesia" and "Good Girls")

Acts' performances in the semi-final
Act	Category (mentor)	Order	Power song	Order	Passion song	Result
Brothers3	Groups (Minogue)	1	"Best Song Ever"	5	"Massachusetts"	Safe
Marlisa Punzalan	Girls (Keating)	2	"Girl on Fire"	6	"Impossible"	Bottom Two
Dean Ray	Boys (Bassingthwaighte)	8	"Folsom Prison Blues"/"That's All Right (Mama)"	3	"The Power of Love"	Safe
Reigan Derry	Over 25s (Redfoo)	4	"Can't Remember to Forget You"	7	"Only Love Can Hurt Like This"	Bottom Two
Final showdown details
Act	Category (mentor)	Order	Song			Result
Reigan Derry	Over 25s (Redfoo)	1	"Hallelujah"			Eliminated
Marlisa Punzalan	Girls (Keating)	2	"Help!"			Safe

Judges' vote to send through to the Grand Final

- Minogue: Marlisa Punzalan – stated that Punzalan had improved more.
- Keating: Marlisa Punzalan – backed his own act, Marlisa Punzalan.
- Redfoo: Reigan Derry – backed his own act, Reigan Derry.
- Bassingthwaighte: Reigan Derry – went with her gut.

With the acts in the bottom two receiving two votes each, the result went to deadlock and reverted to the earlier public vote. Punzalan advanced to the final as the act with the most public votes.

Notes

- During the semi-final week, each judge had one act left in the competition. After Derry's elimination, Redfoo became the only judge with no act in the grand final.
- On 18 October 2014, the performances of three acts entered the ARIA Singles Chart. Dean Ray's performances of "Folsom Prison Blues" / "That's All Right (Mama)" and "The Power of Love" debuted at numbers 49 and 65 respectively, Derry's performance of "Only Love Can Hurt Like This" debuted at number 63, and Brothers3's performance of "Massachusetts" debuted at number 87.

==== Week 11: Final (19/20 October) ====
19 October

- Group performance: "Lovers on the Sun" (performed by top three finalists)

Acts' performances on the Sunday Final
Act	Category (mentor)	Order	Audition song	Order	Duet	Order	Winner's single	Result
Marlisa Punzalan	Girls (Keating)	1	"Yesterday"	8	"Never Be the Same" with Jessica Mauboy	5	"Stand by You"	Safe
Brothers3	Groups (Minogue)	4	"Safe & Sound"	2	"Like a Drum" with Guy Sebastian	7	"The Lucky Ones"	Eliminated
Dean Ray	Boys (Bassingthwaighte)	9	"Bette Davis Eyes"	6	"Dear Darlin'" with Olly Murs	3	"Coming Back"	Safe

Brothers3 received the fewest public votes and were automatically eliminated.

20 October

- Group performances:
  - "Dark Horse" (performed by top thirteen finalists)
  - "Beneath Your Beautiful" (performed by top two finalists)
- Celebrity performers: Olly Murs ("Wrapped Up"), Jessica Mauboy ("Can I Get a Moment?"), Guy Sebastian ("Mama Ain't Proud") and Taylor Swift ("Shake It Off")

Acts' performances on the Monday Final
Act	Category (mentor)	Order	Best Song	Result
Marlisa Punzalan	Girls (Keating)	1	"Titanium"	Winner
Dean Ray	Boys (Bassingthwaighte)	2	"Budapest"	Runner-Up

Notes

- For the first time in season six, there was no theme for the grand final.
- On 25 October 2014, performances from the top three finalists entered the ARIA Singles Chart. Dean Ray's performance of "Bette Davis Eyes" debuted at number 33, Marlisa Punzalan's performance of "Yesterday" debuted at number 67, and Brothers3's performance of "Safe & Sound" debuted at number 82.

== Charity single ==
In September 2014, the top six finalists and Australian pop group Justice Crew recorded a cover of Pharrell Williams' song "Happy" for the Sony Foundation's youth cancer program, You Can. Their version was released on the iTunes Store on 29 September 2014, as a charity single to help raise funds for You Can to establish specialised youth cancer centres across Australia.

== Reception ==
=== Controversy and criticism ===
XOX were criticised by Keating and Redfoo after their performance of Deee-Lite's "Groove Is in the Heart" during the third live show. Redfoo said they look "like a pop act but it's not sounding like a pop act", while Keating said their performance was lacking and "just didn't feel it fired, it just didn't happen. You've got to get it right." However, Bassingthwaighte disagreed with their comments and said she loved the performance. The criticism divided the judging panel as "it quickly became a battle of the sexes". XOX's mentor Minogue told Keating that she was personally offended by his comments because she felt it was hypocritical as he did not like her criticising his acts. She then went on to say, "We took on board the feedback [from last week] so we took this song and did a club remix of it. If you're not used to that and you don't go to clubs anymore because you're too old then I'm sorry."

Following XOX's elimination in week four of the live shows, Minogue stated that she believed the group were the victim of unwarranted criticism, saying that "Other acts have faltered but have not had the same criticism. I feel really strongly about that." In an interview with TV Week, group member Nada-Leigh Nasser believed that Keating's consistently negative comments could have played a part in their elimination: "Ronan is very influential and his opinion does matter. We accept any criticism we get because we know it's all constructive in the end. But we do acknowledge that it would affect a lot of people's opinions."

More controversy occurred after Reigan Derry's performance of Radiohead's "Creep" during the ninth live show, when Minogue criticised Derry's outfit for being too oversexualised. Derry, who used to be a member of the girl band Scarlett Belle, had stated in her audition for The X Factor that she felt people did not get to see the real her because of how oversexualised the band was. Minogue told her: "I watched again your first audition and I listened to every word you said. You know, oversexualised and you just wanted to sing the song and you just wanted everybody to listen to your voice. In the close-ups of this outfit, if you don't want to be oversexualised...I'm getting mixed messages." Derry's mentor Redfoo defended her outfit by saying that it was not oversexualised, before taking aim at Minogue's outfit. He said, "Look what you're wearing! You want to talk about oversexualised, look what you're wearing! Let's get real. Let's get really real. This is see through!" During the ninth live decider show the following night, Redfoo apologised to Minogue for the comments he made about her outfit. Minogue accepted his apology and said "I've had a chat with Reigan and we've sorted it out. We are all moving on."

=== Ratings ===
Colour key:
– Highest rating during the season
– Lowest rating during the season

Week	Episode		Original airdate	Timeslot	Viewers (millions)	Nightly rank	Ref.
1	1	"Auditions"	13 July 2014	Sunday 6:32 pm–8:18 pm	1.226	#2	
1	2	"Auditions"	14 July 2014	Monday 7:31 pm–9:10 pm	0.970	#8	
1	3	"Auditions"	15 July 2014	Tuesday 7:32 pm–9:15 pm	1.245	#2	
2	4	"Auditions"	20 July 2014	Sunday 6:33 pm–8:20 pm	1.274	#4	
2	5	"Auditions"	22 July 2014	Tuesday 7:32 pm–9:17 pm	1.166	#3	
2	6	"Auditions"	23 July 2014	Wednesday 7:32 pm–9:16 pm	1.079	#4	
3	7	"Super Bootcamp"	27 July 2014	Sunday 6:32 pm–8:16 pm	1.114	#5	
3	8	"Super Bootcamp"	29 July 2014	Tuesday 7:35 pm–8:56 pm	1.107	#2	
3	9	"Super Bootcamp"	30 July 2014	Wednesday 7:31 pm–9:05 pm	0.914	#6	
4	10	"Home Visits"	3 August 2014	Sunday 6:32 pm–8:22 pm	1.035	#5	
4	11	"Home Visits"	4 August 2014	Monday 7:29 pm–9:07 pm	1.055	#6	
4	12	"Home Visits"	5 August 2014	Tuesday 7:32 pm–9:07 pm	1.088	#4	
5	13	"Live show 1"	10 August 2014	Sunday 6:32 pm–9:14 pm	1.152	#4	
5	14	"Live decider 1"	11 August 2014	Monday 7:33 pm–8:47 pm	1.107	#4	
6	15	"Live show 2"	17 August 2014	Sunday 6:32 pm–8:53 pm	1.129	#4	
6	16	"Live decider 2"	18 August 2014	Monday 7:31 pm–8:45 pm	1.078	#5	
7	17	"Live show 3"	24 August 2014	Sunday 6:32 pm–8:52 pm	1.115	#5	
7	18	"Live decider 3"	25 August 2014	Monday 7:32 pm–8:47 pm	1.057	#5	
8	19	"Live show 4"	31 August 2014	Sunday 6:32 pm–8:34 pm	1.115	#5	
8	20	"Live decider 4"	1 September 2014	Monday 7:31 pm–8:44 pm	1.167	#3	
9	21	"Live show 5"	7 September 2014	Sunday 6:32 pm–8:31 pm	1.180	#4	
9	22	"Live decider 5"	8 September 2014	Monday 7:33 pm–8:57 pm	1.174	#6	
10	23	"Live show 6"	14 September 2014	Sunday 6:32 pm–8:19 pm	1.202	#4	
10	24	"Live decider 6"	15 September 2014	Monday 7:37 pm–8:51 pm	1.142	#4	
11	25	"Live show 7"	21 September 2014	Sunday 6:35 pm–8:08 pm	1.131	#5	
11	26	"Live decider 7"	23 September 2014	Tuesday 7:37 pm–8:59 pm	1.094	#4	
12	27	"Live show 8"	28 September 2014	Sunday 6:35 pm–7:54 pm	1.113	#4	
12	28	"Live decider 8"	29 September 2014	Monday 7:33 pm–8:57 pm	1.161	#3	
13	29	"Live show 9"	5 October 2014	Sunday 6:35 pm–8:50 pm	0.874	#7	
13	30	"Live decider 9"	6 October 2014	Monday 7:35 pm–8:50 pm	1.062	#6	
14	31	"Live show 10"	12 October 2014	Sunday 6:35 pm–8:21 pm	1.187	#9	
14	32	"Live decider 10"	13 October 2014	Monday 7:32 pm–8:58 pm	1.302	#2	
15	33	"Live Grand Final show"	19 October 2014	Sunday 8:01 pm–10:20 pm	1.316	#1	
15	34	"Live Grand Final decider"	20 October 2014	Monday 7:33 pm–9:49 pm	1.378	#2	
15	34	"Winner announced"	20 October 2014	Monday 7:33 pm–9:49 pm	1.428	#1	
