= Måns Zelmerlöw discography =

Recordings by Swedish pop singer

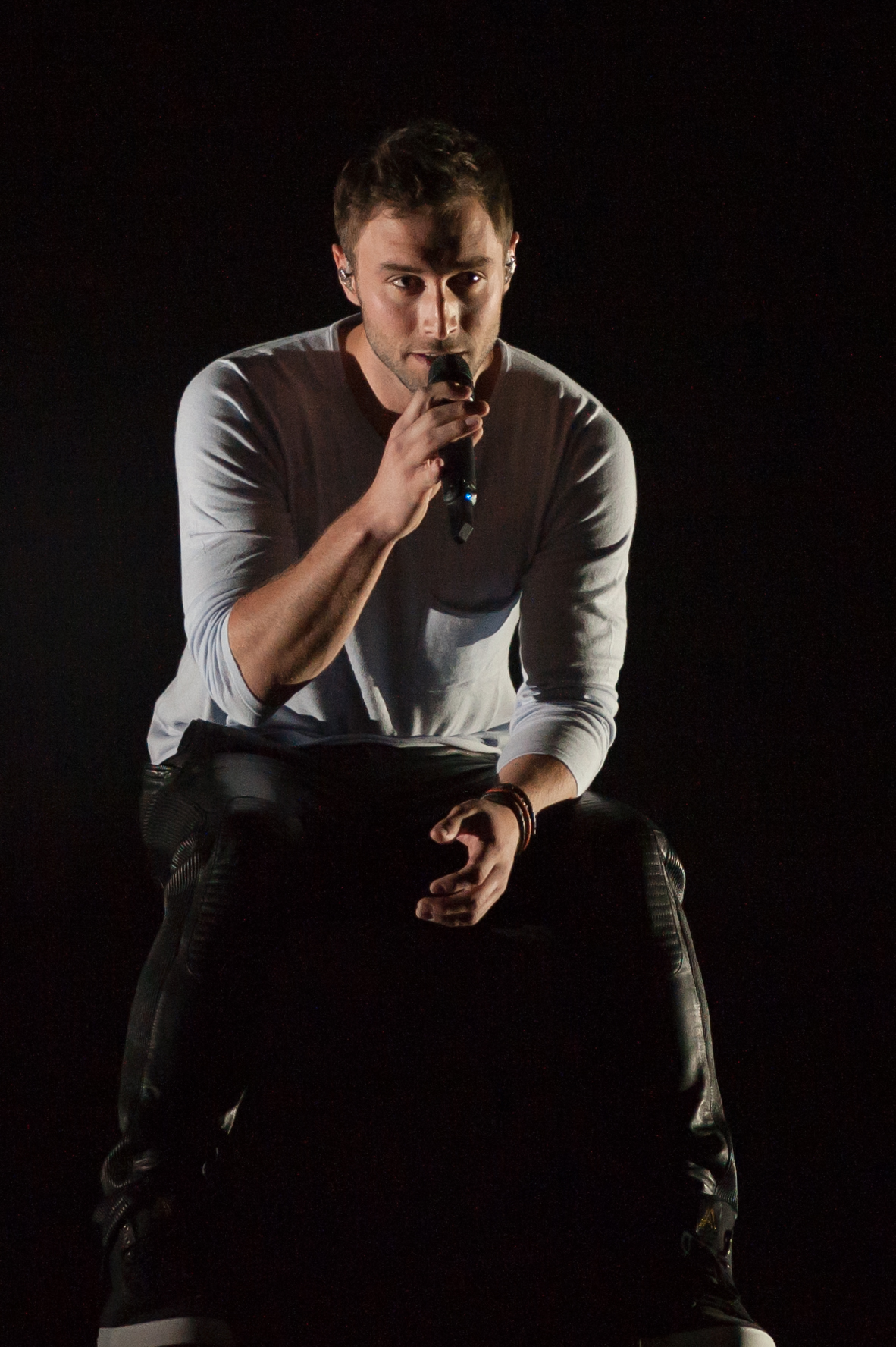
- Zelmerlöw performing at the 2015 Eurovision Song Contest
- Studio albums: 8
- EPs: 4
- Singles: 41
- Music videos: 24

The discography of Måns Zelmerlöw, a Swedish pop singer and television presenter. His debut studio album, Stand by For..., was released in March 2007. It peaked at number 1 on the Swedish Albums Chart. In November 2006, it was announced that Zelmerlöw would compete in Melodifestivalen 2007, Sweden's national final for the Eurovision Song Contest 2007, to be held in Helsinki, Finland. He competed with the song "Cara Mia" in the 3rd semi-final on 17 February 2007 in Örnsköldsvik, and progressed to the final, which was held on 10 March at Globen in Stockholm. There his performance of "Cara Mia" finished in third place behind winners The Ark and runner-up Andreas Johnson. Four singles were released from the album; "Cara Mia", "Work of Art (Da Vinci)", "Brother Oh Brother" and "Miss America", all of which reached the Top 50 in on the Swedish Singles Chart.

MZW, Zelmerlöw's second studio album, was released in March 2009. The album peaked at number 1 on the Swedish Albums Chart. On 18 November 2008, it was announced that he would once again compete in Melodifestivalen, this time with the song "Hope & Glory". Zelmerlöw took part in the second semi-final on 14 February 2009 and once again progressed to the final on 14 March at Globen. "Hope & Glory" ultimately placed fourth despite receiving the most votes from the jury. Four singles were released from the album; "Impossible", "Hope & Glory" and "Hold On" reached the Top 50 in on the Swedish Singles Chart. "Rewind" was released as the fourth single from the album in Poland.

Christmas with Friends, Zelmerlöw's third studio album, was released in November 2010. Kära vinter, Zelmerlöw's fourth studio album, was released in December 2011. Both albums include the singles "December" and "Vit som en snö" with Pernilla Andersson. Barcelona Sessions, Zelmerlöw's fifth studio album, was released in February 2014. The album peaked at number 3 on the Swedish Albums Chart and includes the singles "Broken Parts", "Beautiful Life" and "Run for Your Life".

Perfectly Damaged, Zelmerlöw's sixth studio album, was released in June 2015. It peaked at number 1 on the Swedish Albums Chart. In 2015 it was announced that Zelmerlöw would compete in Melodifestivalen 2015, Sweden's national final for the Eurovision Song Contest 2015. He competed with the song "Heroes" in the 4th semi-final on 28 February 2015 in Örebro, and progressed to the final, which was held on 14 March 2015 at the Friends Arena in Stockholm. There his performance of "Heroes" finished first and represented Sweden at the Eurovision Song Contest 2015, held at the Wiener Stadthalle in Vienna, Austria. He performed during the 2nd Semi-final on 21 May 2015 for a place in the Final. The song progressed to the Final which took place on 23 May 2015. The song went on to win the contest with 365 points. "Should've Gone Home" was released as the second single from the album. The song peaked at number 27 on the Swedish Singles Chart. "Fire in the Rain" was released as the lead single from the re-issued version of the album titled Perfectly Re:Damaged. The song peaked at number 31 on the Swedish Singles Chart.

Chameleon, Zelmerlöw's seventh studio album, was released in December 2016. It peaked at number 6 on the Swedish Albums Chart. "Fire in the Rain" was included as the lead single from the album. "Hanging on to Nothing" was released as the second single from the album on 26 August 2016. The song did not enter the Swedish Singles Chart, but peaked at number 2 on the Sweden Heatseeker Songs. "Glorious" was released as the third single from the album on 24 November 2016. The song did not enter the Swedish Singles Chart, but peaked at number 17 on the Sweden Heatseeker Songs. Time, Zelmerlöw's eighth studio album, was released in October 2019. It peaked at number 18 on the Swedish Albums Chart. The album includes the singles "Walk with Me", "Better Now", "One", "On My Way" and "Mirror".

== Albums ==
=== Studio albums ===
Title	Details	Peak chart positions									Certifications	Sales
Title	Details	SWE	AUT	BEL (Fl)	BEL (Wa)	FIN	GER	NL	SWI	UK	Certifications	Sales
Stand by For...	Released: 24 March 2007; Label: Warner Music Sweden; Format: Digital download, CD	1	—	—	—	—	—	—	—	—	GLF: Gold	SWE: 20,000 (Note: Shipments figures based on certification alone.)
MZW	Released: 25 March 2009; Label: Warner Music Sweden; Format: Digital download, CD	1	—	—	—	—	—	—	—	—	GLF: Gold	SWE: 20,000 (Note: Shipments figures based on certification alone.)
Christmas with Friends	Released: 25 November 2010; Label: Warner Music Sweden; Format: Digital download, CD	—	—	—	—	—	—	—	—	—		
Kära vinter	Released: 19 December 2011; Label: Warner Music Sweden; Format: Digital download, CD	41	—	—	—	—	—	—	—	—		
Barcelona Sessions	Released: 5 February 2014; Label: Warner Music Sweden; Format: Digital download, CD	3	—	—	—	—	—	—	—	—		
Perfectly Damaged	Released: 5 June 2015; Label: Warner Music Sweden; Format: Digital download, CD	1	21	55	85	45	46	26	24	107	GLF: Platinum	SWE: 40,000^{[A]}
Chameleon	Released: 2 December 2016; Label: Warner Music Sweden; Format: Digital download, CD	6	—	159	—	—	—	—	—	—		
Time	Released: 18 October 2019; Label: Warner Music Sweden; Format: Digital download, CD	18	—	—	—	—	—	—	—	—		
"—" denotes an album that did not chart or was not released.

== Extended play ==
Title	Details
On My Way	Released: 24 April 2020; Label: Warner Music Sweden; Format: digital download, streaming
Så Mycket Bättre 2022 (Tolkningarna)	Released: 3 December 2022; Label: Warner Music Sweden; Format: digital download, streaming
Tolkningarna (Unplugged)	Released: 23 December 2022; Label: Warner Music Sweden; Format: digital download, streaming
Nightcaps (with The Agreement)	Released: 13 October 2023; Label: Warner Music Sweden; Format: digital download, streaming

== Singles ==
=== As lead artist ===
Title	Year	Peak chart positions										Certifications	Album
Title	Year	SWE	AUS	AUT	BEL (Fl)	FIN	FRA	GER	IRE	SWI	UK	Certifications	Album
"Cara Mia"	2007	1	—	—	—	4	—	—	—	—	—	GLF: 2× Platinum	Stand by For...
"Work of Art (Da Vinci)"	2007	16	—	—	—	—	—	—	—	—	—		Stand by For...
"Brother Oh Brother"	2007	7	—	—	—	—	—	—	—	—	—		Stand by For...
"All I Want for Christmas Is You" (with Agnes Carlsson)	2007	3	—	—	—	—	—	—	—	—	—		Non-album single
"Miss America"	2008	47	—	—	—	—	—	—	—	—	—		Stand by For...
"Hope & Glory"	2009	2	—	—	—	—	—	—	—	—	—		MZW
"Hold On"	2009	22	—	—	—	—	—	—	—	—	—		MZW
"Impossible"	2009	48	—	—	—	—	—	—	—	—	—		MZW
"December"	2010	— (Note: "December" did not enter the Swedish Singles Chart (Sverigetopplistan), but peaked at number 7 on the Sweden Heatseeker Songs.)	—	—	—	—	—	—	—	—	—		Christmas with Friends
"Vit som en snö" (with Pernilla Andersson)	2010	— (Note: "Vit som en snö" did not enter the Swedish Singles Chart (Sverigetopplistan), but peaked at number 19 on the Sweden Heatseeker Songs.)	—	—	—	—	—	—	—	—	—		Christmas with Friends
"Broken Parts"	2013	—	—	—	—	—	—	—	—	—	—		Barcelona Sessions
"Beautiful Life"	2013	—	—	—	—	—	—	—	—	—	—		Barcelona Sessions
"Run for Your Life"	2014	—	—	—	—	—	—	—	—	—	—		Barcelona Sessions
"Heroes"	2015	1	19	1	2	5	33	3	10	1	11	GLF: 5× Platinum; IFPI AUT: Gold; IFPI NOR: Gold	Perfectly Damaged
"Should've Gone Home" (Note: Zelmerlöw also released a bilingual English/French version titled "Should've Gone Home (Je ne suis qu'un homme)" aimed at French-speaking markets. That single peaked at number 49 on the French Singles Chart.)	2015	27	—	—	—	—	49	—	—	—	—	GLF: Platinum	Perfectly Damaged
"Fire in the Rain" (Note: "Fire in the Rain" also appears on the album Perfectly Re:Damaged.)	2016	31	—	—	—	—	—	—	—	—	—	GLF: Platinum	Chameleon
"Hanging on to Nothing" (Note: Zelmerlöw also released a bilingual English/French version titled "Rien Que Nous Deux (Hanging On to Nothing)" aimed at French-speaking markets.)	2016	— (Note: "Hanging on to Nothing" did not enter the Swedish Singles Chart (Sverigetopplistan), but peaked at number 2 on the Sweden Heatseeker Songs.)	—	—	—	—	—	—	—	—	—		Chameleon
"Glorious"	2016	— (Note: "Glorious" did not enter the Swedish Singles Chart (Sverigetopplistan), but peaked at number 17 on the Sweden Heatseeker Songs.)	—	—	—	—	—	—	—	—	—		Chameleon
"Happyland"	2018	—	—	—	—	—	84	72	—	—	—		Chameleon
"Walk with Me" (with Dotter or Dami Im)	2019	51	—	—	—	—	—	—	—	—	—		Time
"Better Now"	2019	79	—	—	—	—	—	—	—	—	—		Time
"One"	2019	— (Note: "One" did not enter the Swedish Singles Chart (Sverigetopplistan), but peaked at number 20 on the Sweden Heatseeker Songs.)	—	—	—	—	—	—	—	—	—		Time
"Gamle Dager" (with Morgan Sulele)	2020	—	—	—	—	—	—	—	—	—	—		Non-album single
"On My Way"	2020	—	—	—	—	—	—	—	—	—	—		Time
"Mirror"	2020	—	—	—	—	—	—	—	—	—	—		Time
"Alone on Christmas Eve"	2020	92	—	—	—	—	—	—	—	—	—		Non-album single
"Circles and Squares" (with Polina Gagarina)	2021	—	—	—	—	—	—	—	—	—	—		World Figure Skating Championships 2021
"Come Over Love"	2021	—	—	—	—	—	—	—	—	—	—		Non-album singles
"What You Were Made For"	2022	—	—	—	—	—	—	—	—	—	—		Non-album singles
"Midsummer Love"	2022	—	—	—	—	—	—	—	—	—	—		Non-album singles
"Faller (Tell Her)"	2022	67	—	—	—	—	—	—	—	—	—		Så Mycket Bättre 2022 (Tolkningarna)
"Sober (Mer főr varandra)"	2022	73	—	—	—	—	—	—	—	—	—		Så Mycket Bättre 2022 (Tolkningarna)
"Let's Sing (It's Christmas Time)" (with Carola)	2022	48	—	—	—	—	—	—	—	—	—		Non-album single
"Hatar Dig"	2022	—	—	—	—	—	—	—	—	—	—		Så Mycket Bättre 2022 (Tolkningarna)
"This Is The One"	2022	—	—	—	—	—	—	—	—	—	—		Så Mycket Bättre 2022 (Tolkningarna)
"Andetag" (with The Agreement)	2023	—	—	—	—	—	—	—	—	—	—		Nightcaps
"Running Low" (with The Agreement)	2023	—	—	—	—	—	—	—	—	—	—		Nightcaps
"Perfectly Damaged" (with The Agreement)	2023	—	—	—	—	—	—	—	—	—	—		Nightcaps
"Christmas, Christmas Everywhere"	2023	—	—	—	—	—	—	—	—	—	—		Non-album singles
"Walk with Me / Chodź ze mną" (with Ola Kędra)	2024	—	—	—	—	—	—	—	—	—	—		Non-album singles
"Revolution"	2025	3	—	—	—	—	—	—	—	—	—		Non-album singles
"—" denotes a single that did not chart or was not released.

=== As featured artist ===
Title	Year	Album
"Precious to Me" (Maria Haukaas Storeng featuring Måns Zelmerlöw)	2010	Make My Day
"Belong" (Joshua Radin featuring Måns Zelmerlöw)	2016	Non-album singles
"A Christmas Song" (Björnzone)	2024	Non-album singles

=== Promotional singles ===
Title	Year	Album
"Rewind" (Note: "Rewind" was released as a single only in Poland.)	2009	MZW
"Ett lyckligt slut"	2012	Charity single
"Love Love Peace Peace" (with Petra Mede)	2016	Non-album singles
"Stayin' Alive" (Julian Perretta, Francesco Yates and Måns Zelmerlöw)	2016	Non-album singles
"We Can Be The Rulers"	2017	Non-album singles
"Can I Call You Home"	2017	Non-album singles
"Grow Up to Be You"	2019	Time
"Fuego"	2019	Non-album single

== Music videos ==
Title	Year	Director
As lead artist
"Cara Mia"	2007	—N/a
"Brother Oh Brother"	2007	—N/a
"Miss America"	2008	—N/a
"Broken Parts"	2013	Robin Ehlde
"Beautiful Life"	2013	—N/a
"Run For Your Life"	2014	Robin Ehlde
"Heroes" (Lyrics music video)	2015	—N/a
"Should've Gone Home" (Lyrics music video)	2015	—N/a
"Should've Gone Home"	2015	Micke Gustafsson "Mikeadelica"
"Fire In The Rain" (Lyrics music video)	2016	—N/a
"Fire In The Rain"	2016	Micke Gustafsson "Mikeadelica"
"Glorious"	2016	Micke Gustafsson "Mikeadelica"
"Hanging on to Nothing"	2017	Micke Gustafsson "Mikeadelica"
"Happyland"	2018	Robin Olofsson
"Better Now"	2019	Jonathan Wendt
"One"	2019	Robin Ehlde
"On My Way"	2020	—N/a
"What You Were Made For"	2022	Andres Avelin & Ea Czyz
"Let's Sing (It's Christmas Time)"	2022	—N/a
"Faller (Tell Her)" (Official Acoustic video)	2022	—N/a
"Sober (Mer För Varandra)" (Official Acoustic video)	2022	—N/a
"Hatar Dig" (Official Acoustic video)	2022	—N/a
"This Is The One" (Official Acoustic video)	2022	—N/a
"Walk With Me / Chodź ze mną" (Lyrics music video)	2024	—N/a
As featured artist
"Precious to Me"	2010	—N/a
"A Christmas Song"	2024	—N/a
