= Kära vinter =

Studio album by Måns Zelmerlöw
- Released: 19 December 2011
- Recorded: 2010
- Genre: Christmas
- Label: Warner Music Sweden

Måns Zelmerlöw chronology
Christmas with Friends (2010)	Kära vinter (2011)	Barcelona Sessions (2014)

Singles from Kära vinter
- 1. "December" Released: 22 November 2010; 2. "Vit som en snö" Released: 29 November 2010

Kära vinter is the fourth studio album from Swedish singer and model Måns Zelmerlöw. It was released on 19 December 2011 in Sweden, and is a Christmas album. The album failed to chart on the Swedish Albums Chart upon release, but debuted on the chart at number 41 in 2019.

== Track listing ==
No.	Title	Length
1.	"Kära vinter"
2.	"December"
3.	"Christmas Song"
4.	"Winter Wonderland"
5.	"Have Yourself a Merry Little Christmas"
6.	"I Pray on Christmas" (with Björn Skifs)
7.	"Jag drömmer om en jul hemma" (White Christmas)
8.	"Oh, Come All Ye Faithful (Adeste Fideles)"
9.	"Tomten, jag vill ha en riktig jul"
10.	"The Angel Gabriell" (with Lunds studentsångare)
11.	"Vit som en snö" (with Pernilla Andersson)

== Charts ==
Chart (2019)	Peak position
Swedish Albums (Sverigetopplistan)	41

== Release history ==
Region	Date	Label	Format
Sweden	19 December 2011	Warner Music Sweden	CD, digital download
