= Vit som en snö =

"December"

Single by Måns Zelmerlöw with Pernilla Andersson

from the album Christmas with Friends & Kära vinter
- Language: Swedish
- Released: 29 November 2010
- Recorded: 2010
- Genre: Pop
- Length: 2:54
- Label: Warner Music Group

Måns Zelmerlöw singles chronology
"December" (2010)	"December" (2010)	"Broken Parts" (2013)

"Vit som en snö" is a song by Swedish singer Måns Zelmerlöw and Pernilla Andersson. The song was released as a digital download on 29 November 2010 through Warner Music Group as the second single from his third studio album Christmas with Friends (2010). The song is also included on the album Kära vinter (2011). The song did not enter the Swedish Singles Chart, but peaked to number 19 on the Sweden Heatseeker Songs.

== Track listing ==
Digital download
No.	Title	Length
1.	"Vit som en snö" (with Pernilla Andersson)	3:30

== Chart performance ==
=== Weekly charts ===
Chart (2015)	Peak position
Sweden Heatseeker Songs (Sverigetopplistan)	19

== Release history ==
Region	Date	Format	Label
Sweden	29 November 2010	Digital download	Warner Music Group
