= December (Måns Zelmerlöw song) =

Single by Måns Zelmerlöw

from the album Christmas with Friends & Kära vinter
- Released: 22 November 2010
- Recorded: 2010
- Genre: Pop
- Length: 2:54
- Label: Warner Music Group

Måns Zelmerlöw singles chronology
"Precious to Me" (2010)	"December" (2010)	"Vit som en snö" (2010)

"December" is a song by Swedish singer Måns Zelmerlöw. The song was released as a digital download on 22 November 2010 through Warner Music Group as the lead single from his third studio album Christmas with Friends (2010). The song is also included on the album Kära vinter (2011). The song did not enter the Swedish Singles Chart, but peaked to number 9 on the Sweden Heatseeker Songs.

== Track listing ==
Digital download
No.	Title	Length
1.	"December"	2:54

== Chart performance ==
=== Weekly charts ===
Chart (2016)	Peak position
Sweden Heatseeker Songs (Sverigetopplistan)	9

== Release history ==
Region	Date	Format	Label
Sweden	22 November 2010	Digital download	Warner Music Group
