= MZW =

Studio album by Måns Zelmerlöw
- Released: 25 March 2009
- Recorded: 2008/2009
- Genre: Pop
- Length: 39:30
- Label: Warner Music Sweden

Måns Zelmerlöw chronology
Stand by For... (2007)	MZW (2009)	Christmas with Friends (2010)

Singles from MZW
- 1. "Hope & Glory" Released: 1 March 2009; 2. "Hold On" Released: 18 May 2009; 3. "Impossible" Released: 16 November 2009; 4. "Rewind (Polish release only)" Released: 2009

MZW is the second solo album from Swedish singer and model Måns Zelmerlöw. The album fits more into the dance genre than pop as his debut album Stand By For... did. The album features "Hope & Glory", Zerlmerlöw's entry into Melodifestivalen 2009, Sweden's selection process to decide their Eurovision entry. The album peaked at number one on the Swedish Albums Chart, matching the success of Zelmerlöw's first album. Three single have charted from the album, "Hope & Glory", "Hold On" and "Impossible". The album was first released in Sweden on 25 March 2009. The limited edition was released one week after the initial album release on 1 April 2009 and does not differ musically from the standard edition. The only notable differences are that the text on the album cover is printed onto the case itself and not on the paper booklet. Also in the top left hand corner on the reverse of the case there is a Limited Edition number.

== Singles ==
- "Hope & Glory" was released as the lead single from the album on 1 March 2009. It entered the Swedish Singles Chart at number 22 = but peaked at number 2 due to promotion from the Melodifestivalen performances. 'Hope & Glory' was physically released as a single, the CD features an instrumental version of the track. The live performance from Melodifestivalen has served as the official video for the song.
- "Hold On" was released as the second single from the album on 18 May 2009. The song peaked to number 22 on the Swedish Singles Chart. It was released on 3 June 2009 as a download only single. No official video has been made for the single.
- "Impossible" was released as the third and final single from the album on 16 November 2009. The song peaked to number 48 on the Swedish Singles Chart.
- "Rewind" was released as single promoting the CD in Poland.

== Track listing ==
Standard listing
No.	Title	Writer(s)	Length
1.	"Hope & Glory"	Måns Zelmerlöw; Fredrik Kempe; Henrik Wikström	3:02
2.	"One Minute More"	Zelmerlöw; Kempe; Eshraque Ishi Mughal	2:59
3.	"Freak Out"	Zelmerlöw; David Clewett; Jason Gill	3:38
4.	"Impossible"	Zelmerlöw; Aleena Gibson; Dan Sandquist	3:47
5.	"Find Love"	Zelmerlöw; Ishi Mughal; Michel Zitron	3:33
6.	"Rewind"	Zelmerlöw; Clewett; Gill	3:26
7.	"Forever"	Zelmerlöw; Kempe	3:27
8.	"Saved Again"	Zelmerlöw; Kempe; Ishi Mughal	2:59
9.	"Home"	Zelmerlöw; Kempe; Ishi Mughal	3:14
10.	"A Stranger Saved My Life"	Zelmerlöw; Kempe	4:13
11.	"Whole New World"	Zelmerlöw; Moh Denebi	3:43
12.	"Hold On"	Zelmerlöw; Clewett; Gill	3:51
13.	"Et Maintenant & Kids" (Bonus Live Video)	Gilbert Bécaud; Pierre Delanoë

iTunes Deluxe Edition
No.	Title	Writer(s)	Length
13.	"Hope and Glory" (Acoustic Version)	Zelmerlöw; Kempe; Wikström	3:45
14.	"Cara Mia" (Acoustic Version)	Kempe; Wikström	4:02
15.	"Maniac" (Acoustic Version)	Michael Sembello	4:26

== Charts ==
=== Weekly charts ===
Chart (2009)	Peak position
Swedish Albums (Sverigetopplistan)	1

=== Year-end charts ===
Chart (2009)	Position
Swedish Albums (Sverigetopplistan)	57

=== Certifications ===
Region	Certification	Certified units/sales
Sweden (GLF)	Gold	20,000^{^}
^{^} Shipments figures based on certification alone.

== Release history ==
Region	Date	Label	Format	Version
Sweden	25 March 2009	Warner Music Sweden	CD, Digital download	Original
Sweden	1 April 2009	Warner Music Sweden	CD	Limited Edition
Poland	27 April 2009	Warner Music Poland	CD	Original
