= Christmas with Friends =

Christmas with Friends may refer to:

- Christmas with Friends (India.Arie and Joe Sample album), 2015
- Christmas with Friends (Måns Zelmerlöw album), 2010
