= I Pray on Christmas =

Song by Harry Connick Jr

from the album When My Heart Finds Christmas
- Released: 1993
- Recorded: Capitol Studios, Hollywood, CA, July 1993
- Genre: Christmas
- Length: 3:48
- Label: Sony/Columbia
- Songwriter(s): Harry Connick Jr
- Producer(s): Tracey Freeman

"I Pray on Christmas" is a Christmas carol with music and lyrics by Harry Connick Jr. First released in 1993 on his multi platinum album When My Heart Finds Christmas. Connick has also released the song on his Christmas Special VHS in 1994, and again on his DVD Harry for the Holidays (2003) as a bonus track featuring Connick and Kim Burrell.

== Sample of the lyrics ==
I pray on Christmas
Oh, the sick will soon be strong
I pray on Christmas
The Lord will hear my song

I pray on Christmas
That God will lead the way
And I pray I really pray on Christmas
He'll get me through another day

== Also recorded by ==
- Dave Barnes, album Very Merry Christmas (2010).
- Lynda Randle with Michael Tait, on the album Christmas (2005).
- Blind Boys of Alabama with Solomon Burke, on album Go Tell It on the Mountain (2003).
- The Oak Ridge Boys, on the album An Inconvenient Christmas (2002).
- Kirk Talley, album Talley-ho-ho-ho! (1999).
- Måns Zelmerlöw, album Christmas with Friends (2010).
- Miriam Mandipira and The Danish Radio Big Band, album Jazzin Around Christmas (2016)
