= Run for Your Life (Måns Zelmerlöw song) =

Single by Måns Zelmerlöw

from the album Barcelona Sessions
- Released: 14 January 2014
- Recorded: 2012/13
- Genre: Pop
- Length: 3:20
- Label: Warner Music Sweden
- Songwriter(s): Måns Zelmerlöw; Gavin Jones; Robert Habolin
- Producer(s): Robert Habolin

Måns Zelmerlöw singles chronology
"Beautiful Life" (2013)	"Run for Your Life" (2014)	"Heroes" (2015)

"Run for Your Life" is a song recorded by Swedish singer Måns Zelmerlöw. It was released on 14 January 2014 as a digital download in Sweden. It was released as the third single from his fifth studio album Barcelona Sessions (2014). The song was written by Zelmerlöw, Gavin Jones and Robert Habolin, who also produced the song.

== Live performances ==
Zelmerlöw has performed the song live on Musikhjälpen and Nyhetsmorgon.

== Music video ==
A music video to accompany the release of "Run for Your Life" was first released onto YouTube on 17 January 2014 at a total length of three minutes and forty-one seconds. The video was directed by Robin Ehlde.

== Track listing ==
Digital download
No.	Title	Length
1.	"Run for Your Life"	3:20

== Release history ==
Region	Date	Format	Label
Sweden	14 January 2014	Digital download	Warner Music Sweden
