= Should've Gone Home =

Single by Måns Zelmerlöw

from the album Perfectly Damaged
- Released: 7 August 2015
- Recorded: 2015
- Genre: Pop
- Length: 3:33
- Label: Warner Music
- Songwriter(s): Fredrik Sonefors; Martin Bjelke; Micky Skeel
- Producer(s): Fredrik Sonefors; Martin Bjelke

Måns Zelmerlöw singles chronology
"Heroes" (2015)	"Should've Gone Home" (2015)	"Fire in the Rain" (2016)

"Should've Gone Home" is a song by Swedish singer Måns Zelmerlöw. It was released on 7 August 2015 as the second single from Zelmerlöw's sixth studio album, Perfectly Damaged (2015), following the Eurovision Song Contest 2015 winning song "Heroes". The song was written by Fredrik Sonefors, Martin Bjelke, and Micky Skeel. The song has peaked at number 27 on the Swedish Singles Chart.

Zelmerlöw also released a bilingual English/French version titled "Should've Gone Home (Je ne suis qu'un homme)". That single charted on SNEP, the official French Singles Chart.

== Live performances ==
Zelmerlöw performed the song from the roof of a building next to the Liseberg crowd at the Lotta på Liseberg, creating both a feeling of "isolation" and intimacy.

== Music video ==
The music video, which was directed by Mikeadelica, was released on 16 September 2015 after being "unlocked" by the fans via streaming of the song online platforms. It features a backwards story of Zelmerlöw going to tell his girlfriend about his cheating.

== Track listing ==
Digital download
No.	Title	Length
1.	"Should've Gone Home"	3:33

== Chart performance ==
=== Weekly charts ===
"Should've Gone Home"

Chart (2015–16)	Peak position
France (SNEP)	172
Sweden (Sverigetopplistan)	27

"Should've Gone Home (Je ne suis qu'un homme)"

Chart (2016)	Peak position
Belgium (Ultratip Wallonia)	47
France (SNEP)	49
France (SNEP Radio)	2

== Certifications ==
Region	Certification	Certified units/sales
Sweden (GLF)	Platinum	40,000^{‡}
^{‡} Sales+streaming figures based on certification alone.

== Release history ==
Region	Date	Format	Label
Sweden	7 August 2015	Digital download	Warner Music Sweden
