= Work of Art (Da Vinci) =

Single by Måns Zelmerlöw

from the album Stand by For...
- Released: 13 June 2007
- Recorded: 2006/07
- Genre: Pop
- Length: 3:46
- Label: Warner Music Sweden
- Songwriters: Niklas Edberger; Henrik Wikström; Måns Zelmerlöw
- Producers: Niklas Edberger; Henrik Wikström

Måns Zelmerlöw singles chronology
"Cara Mia" (2007)	"Work of Art (Da Vinci)" (2007)	"Brother Oh Brother" (2007)

"Work of Art (Da Vinci)" is a song recorded by Swedish singer Måns Zelmerlöw. It was released on 13 June 2007 as a digital download in Sweden as the second single from his debut studio album Stand by For... (2007). The song was written by Niklas Edberger, Henrik Wikström and Zelmerlöw. It peaked at number 16 on the Swedish singles chart.

== Track listing ==
Digital download
No.	Title	Length
1.	"Work of Art (Da Vinci)"	3:46
2.	"Work of Art (Da Vinci)" (PJ Harmony Summer Nice Version)	5:27
3.	"Work of Art (Da Vinci)" (Ali Payami Club Remix)	6:36
4.	"Work of Art (Da Vinci)" (Ali Payami Vocal Remix)	6:36
5.	"Work of Art (Da Vinci)" (PJ Harmony Summer Radio Edit)	3:15

== Chart performance ==
=== Weekly charts ===
Chart (20)	Peak position
Sweden (Sverigetopplistan)	16

== Release history ==
Region	Date	Format	Label
Sweden	13 June 2007	Digital download	Warner Music Sweden

== See also ==
- Leonardo da Vinci
