= Brother Oh Brother =

Single by Måns Zelmerlöw

from the album Stand by For...
- Released: 10 October 2007
- Recorded: 2006–2007
- Genre: Pop
- Length: 3:26; 3:44 (music video)
- Label: Warner Music Sweden
- Songwriters: Fredrik Kempe; Henrik Wikström
- Producer: Henrik Wikström

Måns Zelmerlöw singles chronology
"Work of Art (Da Vinci)" (2007)	"Brother Oh Brother" (2007)	"All I Want for Christmas Is You" (2007)

Music video
- "Brother Oh Brother" on YouTube

"Brother Oh Brother" is a song recorded by Swedish singer Måns Zelmerlöw. It was released on 10 October 2007 as a digital download in Sweden. It was released as the third single from his debut studio album Stand by For... (2007). The song was written by Fredrik Kempe and Henrik Wikström. The song peaked at 7th position at Sverigetopplistan, and also became a Svensktoppen success staying on the chart for eight weeks between 18 November-6 January 2008 before leaving chart. The song was also performed by Black-Ingvars at Dansbandskampen 2009.

== Track listing ==
Digital download
No.	Title	Length
1.	"Brother Oh Brother"	3:26
2.	"Brother Oh Brother" (Video Version)	3:37
3.	"Brother Oh Brother" (Payami Remix)	3:59
4.	"Brother Oh Brother" (PJ Harmony Remix)	4:19
5.	"Brother Oh Brother" (West Coast Version)	4:15

== Charts ==
=== Weekly charts ===
Chart (2007–08)	Peak position
Poland (Polish Airplay Charts)	4
Sweden (Sverigetopplistan)	7

=== Year-end charts ===
Chart (2007)	Position
Sweden (Sverigetopplistan)	100

== Release history ==
Region	Date	Format	Label
Sweden	7 November 2007	Digital download	Warner Music Sweden
