= Alone on Christmas Eve =

Single by Måns Zelmerlöw
- Released: 6 November 2020
- Length: 3:45
- Label: Warner
- Songwriters: Måns Zelmerlöw; Robert Jallinder; Theo Kylin; Tobias Stenkjær
- Producer: Fredrik Sonefors

Måns Zelmerlöw singles chronology
"Mirror" (2020)	"Alone on Christmas Eve" (2020)	"Circles and Squares" (2021)

"Alone on Christmas Eve" is a song by Swedish singer Måns Zelmerlöw. The song was released as a digital download on 6 November 2020 through Warner Music Sweden. The song was written by Måns Zelmerlöw, Robert Jallinder, Theo Kylin and Tobias Stenkjaer. The song peaked at number ninety-two on the Swedish Singles Chart.

== Critical reception ==
Renske ten Veen of Wiwibloggs wrote, "With 'Alone On Christmas Eve', Måns Zelmerlöw gives us a contemporary holiday pop song. It's a powerful and daring spin on the genre, but it succeeds. As the Eurovision 2015 champion called it on Instagram, 'Alone On Christmas Eve' is a lovely little Christmas song that you definitely want to add to your playlists."

== Music video ==
A music video to accompany the release of "Alone on Christmas Eve" was first released onto YouTube on 29 November 2020.

== Personnel ==
Credits adapted from Tidal.

- Fredrik Sonefors – producer
- Måns Zelmerlöw – writer
- Robert Jallinder – writer
- Theo Kylin – writer
- Tobias Stenkjaer – writer

== Charts ==
Chart performance for "Alone on Christmas Eve"
Chart (2020)	Peak position
Sweden (Sverigetopplistan)	92
