= Happyland (song) =

Single by Måns Zelmerlöw

from the album Chameleon
- Released: 2 February 2018
- Genre: Pop
- Length: 3:20
- Label: Warner Music Group
- Songwriter(s): Joy Deb; Ola Svensson; Linnea Deb; Anton Hård af Segerstad
- Producer(s): The Family

Måns Zelmerlöw singles chronology
"Glorious" (2016)	"Happyland" (2018)	"Walk with Me" (2019)

Music video
- "Happyland" on YouTube

"Happyland" is a song by Swedish singer Måns Zelmerlöw. The song was released as a digital download on 2 February 2018 through Warner Music Group as the fourth single from his seventh studio album Chameleon (2016).

== Music video ==
A music video to accompany the release of "Happyland" was first released online, to a YouTube channel, on 9 February 2018 at a total length of four minutes and four seconds.

== Track listing ==
Digital download
No.	Title	Length
1.	"Happyland"	3:20
2.	"Happyland" (Acoustic version)	3:34

== Charts ==
=== Weekly charts ===
Chart (2018)	Peak position
Czech Republic (Rádio – Top 100)	15
Germany (GfK)	72
Hungary (Single Top 40)	12

=== Year-end charts ===
Chart (2018)	Position
Hungary (Single Top 40)	54

== Release history ==
Region	Date	Format	Label
Sweden	2 February 2018	Digital download	Warner Music Group
