= Birgitta Sahlén =

Swedish academic

- Born: Birgitta Sigrid Maria Sahlén; January 29, 1953 (age 73)
- Scientific career
- Fields: Speech and language pathology
- Institutions: Lund University

Birgitta Sigrid Maria Sahlén (born 29 January 1953) is a Swedish speech and language pathologist who is a professor at Lund University. She became a professor at the university in March 2012. She is the mother of singer Måns Zelmerlöw.
