= Impossible (Måns Zelmerlöw song) =

Single by Måns Zelmerlöw

from the album MZW
- Released: January 2009
- Recorded: 2008
- Genre: Pop
- Length: 3:47
- Label: Warner Music Sweden
- Songwriter(s): Aleena Gibson; Måns Zelmerlöw; Dan Sandquist

Måns Zelmerlöw singles chronology
"Hold On" (2009)	"Impossible" (2009)	"Precious to Me" (2010)

"Impossible" is a song recorded by Swedish singer Måns Zelmerlöw. It was released on 16 November 2009 as a digital download in Sweden. It was released as the third single from his second studio album MZW (2009). The song was written by Aleena Gibson, Måns Zelmerlöw and Dan Sandquist. It peaked at number 48 on the Swedish Singles Chart.

== Track listing ==
Digital download
No.	Title	Length
1.	"Impossible"	3:47

== Chart performance ==
=== Weekly charts ===
Chart (2009)	Peak position
Sweden (Sverigetopplistan)	48

== Release history ==
Region	Date	Format	Label
Sweden	16 November 2009	Digital download	Warner Music Sweden
