= Glorious (Måns Zelmerlöw song) =

Single by Måns Zelmerlöw

from the album Chameleon
- Released: 24 November 2016
- Recorded: 2015
- Genre: Pop
- Length: 3:24
- Label: Warner Music Group
- Songwriter(s): Måns Zelmerlöw; Jez Ashurst; Emma Rohan; Paddy Dalton; Phil Cook
- Producer(s): Phil Cook

Måns Zelmerlöw singles chronology
"Hanging on to Nothing" (2016)	"Glorious" (2016)	"Happyland" (2018)

Music video
- "Glorious" on YouTube

"Glorious" is a song by Swedish singer Måns Zelmerlöw. The song was released as a digital download on 24 November 2016 through Warner Music Group as the third single from his seventh studio album Chameleon (2016). The song did not enter the Swedish Singles Chart, but peaked at number 17 on the Sweden Heatseeker Songs.

== Music video ==
A music video to accompany the release of "Glorious" was first released onto YouTube on 25 November 2016, with a total running length of three minutes and thirty-eight seconds.

== Live performances ==
- Idol (25 November 2016)

== Track listing ==
Digital download
No.	Title	Length
1.	"Glorious"	3:24

== Chart performance ==
=== Weekly charts ===
Chart (2016)	Peak position
Sweden Heatseeker Songs (Sverigetopplistan)	17

== Release history ==
Region	Date	Format	Label
Sweden	24 November 2016	Digital download	Warner Music Group
