= Miss America (Måns Zelmerlöw song) =

Single by Måns Zelmerlöw

from the album Stand by For...
- Released: 5 May 2008
- Recorded: 2006/07
- Genre: Pop
- Length: 3:37
- Label: Warner Music Sweden
- Songwriter(s): Fredrik Kempe
- Producer(s): Dan Sundquist

Måns Zelmerlöw singles chronology
"All I Want for Christmas Is You" (2007)	"Miss America" (2008)	"Hope & Glory" (2009)

"Miss America" is a song recorded by Swedish singer Måns Zelmerlöw. It was released on 5 May 2008 as a digital download in Sweden. It was released as the fourth single from his studio album Stand by For... (2007). The song was written by Fredrik Kempe. It peaked at number 47 on the Swedish Singles Chart.

It also peaked at 16th position at Trackslistan and 35th position at Digilistan.

== Track listing ==
Digital download – Album version
No.	Title	Length
1.	"Miss America"	3:37

Digital download – EP
No.	Title	Length
1.	"Miss America" (PJ Harmony Radio Edit)	3:37
2.	"Miss America" (PJ Harmony Extended Edit)	6:28
3.	"Miss America" (Funky Pee Remix)	3:12

== Chart performance ==
=== Weekly charts ===
Chart (2008)	Peak position
Sweden (Sverigetopplistan)	47

== Release history ==
Region	Date	Format	Label
Sweden	5 May 2008	Digital download	Warner Music Sweden
