= Hold On (Måns Zelmerlöw song) =

Single by Måns Zelmerlöw

from the album MZW
- Released: 18 May 2009
- Recorded: 2008–2009
- Length: 3:51
- Label: Warner Music Sweden
- Songwriters: David Clewett; Jason Gill; Måns Zelmerlöw

Måns Zelmerlöw singles chronology
"Hope & Glory" (2009)	"Hold On" (2009)	"Impossible" (2009)

"Hold On" is a song recorded by Swedish singer Måns Zelmerlöw, released as a digital download on 18 May 2009 in Sweden. It was released as the second (third overall) single from his second studio album MZW (2009). The song was written by David Clewett, Jason Gill and Måns Zelmerlöw. It peaked at 22 on the Swedish Singles Chart.

== Track listing ==
Digital download
No.	Title	Length
1.	"Hold On"	3:51

== Charts ==
=== Weekly charts ===
Weekly chart performance for "Hold On"
Chart (2009)	Peak position
Sweden (Sverigetopplistan)	22

== Release history ==
Release history and formats for "Hold On"
Region	Date	Format	Label	Ref.
Sweden	18 May 2009	Digital download	Warner Music Sweden	
