= Stand by For... =

Studio album by Måns Zelmerlöw
- Released: 23 May 2007
- Recorded: 2006/2007
- Genre: Pop
- Label: Warner Music Sweden

Måns Zelmerlöw chronology
Stand by For... (2007)	MZW (2009)

Singles from Stand by For...
- 1. "Cara Mia" Released: 5 March 2007; 2. "Work of Art (Da Vinci)" Released: 13 June 2007; 3. "Brother Oh Brother" Released: 7 November 2007; 4. "Miss America" Released: 5 May 2008

Stand by For... is the debut studio album from Swedish singer and model Måns Zelmerlöw. It was released on 23 May 2007, debuting and peaking at number 1 on the official Swedish album chart. The album has spawned 4 top 50 singles including "Cara Mia", Måns' entry in Melodifestivalen 2007. The album has been certified Gold with sales of over 29,000 copies.

== Singles ==
- "Cara Mia" was the first single to be taken from the album and was Måns' entry for Melodifestivalen 2007, the song took third place in the contest. 'Cara Mia' was released both digitally and physically and debuted at number 9 in Sweden, but peaked at number 1 four weeks later. A promo video was filmed for the song, shots of which appear on the last page of the album booklet.
- "Work of Art (Da Vinci)", released on 13 June 2007 is the second single from the album. It was released physically and digitally but no promo clip was filmed to accompany it. It charted at number 56 and peaked at number 16. It has been remixed as a house music track by Swedish musician Ali Payami and German DJ Klaas, the latter entitled "Roller Head".
- "Brother Oh Brother" was released as a download only single on 7 November 2007, it peaked at number 7 on the singles chart. A promo clip was filmed to go with the release.
- "Miss America" was released as a digital single on 5 May 2008, a video clip was also filmed to accompany the release, the song peaked at number 47 and only charted for 2 weeks making it Måns' poorest selling official release to date.

== Track listing ==
Standard listing
No.	Title	Writer(s)	Length
1.	"Miss America"	Fredrik Kempe	3:37
2.	"The Prayer"	Peter Bladh	4:14
3.	"Paradise"	Måns Zelmerlöw; Anders Bagge; Peter Sjöström	4:02
4.	"Lively Up Your Monday"	Magnus McKenzie; Mats Ymell; Per Hed	2:54
5.	"Stand By"	Zelmerlöw; Niklas Olovson; Robin Mortensen Lynch	3:03
6.	"Please Me"	Zelmerlöw; Niklas Edberger; Henrik Wikström	3:00
7.	"Cara Mia"	Kempe; Wikström	3:04
8.	"Agent Zero"	Zelmerlöw; Niklas Olovson; Mortensen Lynch	4:24
9.	"Brother Oh Brother"	Kempe; Wikström	3:27
10.	"Maniac"	Michael Sembello	3:04
11.	"Dreaming"	Zelmerlöw; Kempe; Wikström	3:44
12.	"Work of Art (Da Vinci)"	Zelmerlöw; Wikström; Edberger	3:46
13.	"My Mistake"	Zelmerlöw; Kempe	8:03

- "Cara Mia" (Acoustic) starts at 3:57 of track 13

== Chart performance ==
The album debuted at number one on the Swedish Albums Chart and stayed on the chart for 29 weeks.

=== Weekly charts ===
Chart (2007)	Peak position
Sweden (Sverigetopplistan)	1

== Certifications ==
Region	Certification	Certified units/sales
Sweden (GLF)	Gold	20,000^{^}
^{^} Shipments figures based on certification alone.

== Release history ==
Region	Date	Label	Format
Sweden	23 May 2007	Warner Music Sweden	CD, digital download
Poland	17 September 2007	Warner Music Poland	CD
