= Time (Måns Zelmerlöw album) =

Studio album by Måns Zelmerlöw
- Released: 18 October 2019
- Recorded: 2018
- Length: 37:58
- Label: Warner Music Sweden
- Producer: Peter Hammerton; Pontus Persson; Oliver Lundstorm; Fredrik Samson; Alex Shield; Pontus Persson; Mac & Phil; Joy Deb; Anu Pillai; David Björk

Måns Zelmerlöw chronology
Chameleon (2016)	Time (2019)

Singles from Time
- 1. "Walk with Me" Released: 1 March 2019; 2. "Better Now" Released: 17 May 2019; 3. "One" Released: 21 November 2019; 4. "On My Way" Released: 24 April 2020; 5. "Mirror" Released: 21 August 2020

Time is the eighth studio album from Swedish singer Måns Zelmerlöw. It was released on 18 October 2019 through Warner Music Sweden. The album includes the singles "Walk with Me" and "Better Now". The album peaked at number eighteen on the Swedish Albums Chart.

== Background ==
In August 2019, Zelmerlöw announced that he would release his new album in October. He also announced a four date tour across Sweden in October in connection with the release of the album. He said in an interview, "It is always best to play at home in Sweden and in the fall you will see that something completely new." Some recording sessions took place during songwriting camps in Battersea with others at Peter Gabriel's Real World studios. When talking about the album, he said, "It begins with a letter from myself to my younger self as a young boy, then it moves to quite a dark place, before things turn around for the better again."

== Commercial performance ==
On 25 October 2019, the album entered the Swedish Albums Chart at number eighteen, making it Zelmerlöw's first album not to debut in the top 10 in Sweden.

== Critical reception ==
Scandipop gave the album a mixed review stating, "He's calling it by far his best album to date. But given the fact that earlier this year he did the unforgivable and publicly slated his earlier work, it's now somewhat difficult to invest too much into what he puts his name to, without wondering if in ten years' time he'll be referring to what you like of his right now, as pretty damn awful." Florian Rahn from Wiwibloggs gave the album a positive review stating, "He knows his sound and how to deliver a well-produced body of work."

== Singles ==
"Walk with Me" was released as the lead single from the album on 1 March 2019. Måns and Dotter performed the song live during Melodifestivalen 2019. The song peaked at number 51 on the Swedish Singles Chart. "Better Now" was released as the second single from the album on 17 May 2019. The song peaked at number 79 on the Swedish Singles Chart. "One" was released as the third single from the album on 21 November 2019. The song did not enter the Swedish Singles Chart, but peaked at number 20 on the Sweden Heatseeker Songs. "On My Way" was released as the fourth single from the album on 24 April 2020. "Mirror" was released as the fifth single from the album on 21 August 2020.

== Track listing ==
No.	Title	Writer(s)	Producer(s)	Length
1.	"On My Way"	Måns Zelmerlöw; Jon Eyden; Pete Hammerton	Fredrik Sonefors; Pete Hammerton	3:01
2.	"Faker"	Zelmerlöw; Eyden; Oliver Lundstorm; Paul Stanborough	Oliver Lundstorm	3:18
3.	"Walk with Me" (with Dotter)	Zelmerlöw; Johanna Maria Jansson; Andrew Jackson; Sonef Peter Milton; Daniel Goudie; Rachel Clare Furner		2:48
4.	"Careless"	Zelmerlöw; Eyden	Fredrik Samson; Oliver Lundström	3:34
5.	"Real Life"	Zelmerlöw; Brooke Toya; Eyden; Alex Shield	Alex Shield	3:46
6.	"Time"	Oliver Lundström	Lundström	0:54
7.	"Better Now"	Zelmerlöw; Emma Rohan; Peter Mark Hammerton; Tom Mann	Peter Hammerton; Pontus Persson	3:09
8.	"One"	Zelmerlöw; Eyden; Matthew Holmes; Phillip Leigh	Mac & Phil	3:19
9.	"Mirror"	Zelmerlöw; Joy Deb; Melanie Wehbe; Moh Denebi	Joy Deb	3:27
10.	"Grow Up to Be You"	Zelmerlöw; Anu Pillai; David Sneddon	Anu Pillai; Persson	3:27
11.	"U & I"	Zelmerlöw; Alex Shield; Eyden	Shield	3:35
12.	"Something to You"	Zelmerlöw; David Björk; Eyden	David Björk	3:40
Total length:				37:58

== Charts ==
=== Weekly charts ===
Chart (2019)	Peak position
Swedish Albums (Sverigetopplistan)	18

=== Year-end charts ===
Chart (2020)	Position
Swedish Albums (Sverigetopplistan)	66

== Release history ==
Region	Date	Format	Label
Sweden	18 October 2019	Digital download; streaming	Warner Music Sweden
