= Walk with Me (Måns Zelmerlöw and Dotter song) =

2019 song by Måns Zelmerlöw and Dotter

Single by Måns Zelmerlöw and Dotter

from the album Time
- Released: 1 March 2019
- Recorded: 2018
- Genre: Pop
- Length: 2:48
- Label: Warner Music Group
- Songwriter(s): Måns Zelmerlöw; Johanna Maria Jansson; Andrew Jackson; Ashley Peter Milton; Daniel Goudie; Rachel Clare Furner

Måns Zelmerlöw singles chronology
"Happyland" (2018)	"Walk with Me" (2019)	"Better Now" (2019)

Dotter singles chronology
"Heatwave" (2018)	"Walk with Me" (2019)	"I Do" (2019)

"Walk with Me" is a song by Swedish singers Måns Zelmerlöw and Dotter. The song was released as a digital download on 1 March 2019 through Warner Music Group as the lead single from Zelmerlöw's eighth studio album Time. The song peaked at number 51 on the Swedish Singles Chart. The song was written by Måns Zelmerlöw, Johanna Maria Jansson, Andrew Jackson, Ashley Peter Milton, Daniel Goudie and Rachel Clare Furner.

== Live performances ==
- Melodifestivalen 2019 (2 March 2019)

== Lyric video ==
A lyric video to accompany the release of "Walk with Me" was first released onto YouTube on 28 February 2019 at a total length of two minutes and forty-eight seconds.

== Charts ==
Chart (2019)	Peak position
Sweden (Sverigetopplistan)	51

== Release history ==
Region	Date	Format	Label
Sweden	1 March 2019	Digital download	Warner Music Group

== Dami Im version ==
"Walk with Me"

Single by Måns Zelmerlöw and Dami Im
- Released: 6 February 2020
- Genre: Pop
- Length: 2:48
- Label: Warner Music Group

Dami Im singles chronology
"Kiss You Anyway" (2020)	"Walk with Me" (2020)	"Marching On" (2020)

Zelmerlöw re-recorded the song with Australian singer Dami Im and released the single on 6 February 2020. The duo performed the song live at Eurovision - Australia Decides; The Australian song competition to determine the country's representative for the 2020 Eurovision Song Contest.

== Release history ==
Region	Date	Format	Label
various	6 February 2020	Digital download, streaming	Warner Music Group
