= Chameleon (Måns Zelmerlöw album) =

Studio album by Måns Zelmerlöw
- Released: 2 December 2016
- Recorded: 2015
- Genre: Pop
- Length: 35:33
- Label: Warner Music Sweden
- Producer: Phil Cook; Jez Ashurst; The Family; Moh Denebi; Nicki Adamsson; Fredrik Sonefors; Isac Hördegård

Måns Zelmerlöw chronology
Perfectly Damaged (2015)	Chameleon (2016)	Time (2019)

Singles from Chameleon
- 1. "Fire in the Rain" Released: 4 May 2016; 2. "Hanging on to Nothing" Released: 26 August 2016; 3. "Glorious" Released: 24 November 2016; 4. "Happyland" Released: 2 February 2018

Chameleon is the seventh studio album from Swedish singer Måns Zelmerlöw. It was released on 2 December 2016 through Warner Music Sweden. The album includes the singles "Fire in the Rain", "Hanging on to Nothing" and "Glorious". The album peaked at number 6 on the Swedish Albums Chart. The album was produced by Phil Cook, Jez Ashurst, The Family, Moh Denebi, Nicki Adamsson, Fredrik Sonefors and Isac Hördegård.

== Background ==
On 8 November 2016, Måns announced on Facebook that he would be releasing his new album Chameleon on 2 December 2016 and the third single "Glorious" would be released on 24 November 2016. On 1 December 2016 he announced that he written the album in Bath, Copenhagen and South Africa, he also said "A HUGE thank you to everyone who's been involved and most of all thank you to all #månsters out there for your incredible support".

== Commercial performance ==
On 9 December 2016, the album entered the Swedish Albums Chart at number 6, making it Zelmerlöw's fifth top 10 album in Sweden. It dropped off the chart the following week. On 10 December 2016 the album entered the Belgian Flemish Albums Chart at number 159.

== Singles ==
"Fire in the Rain" was released as the lead single from the re-issued version of Zelmerlöw's sixth studio album Perfectly Damaged on 4 May 2016, but the song was also released as the lead single from Chameleon. "Hanging on to Nothing" was released as the second single from the album on 26 August 2016. The song did not enter the Swedish Singles Chart, but peaked to number 2 on the Sweden Heatseeker Songs. "Glorious" was released as the third single from the album on 24 November 2016. The song did not enter the Swedish Singles Chart, but peaked to number 17 on the Sweden Heatseeker Songs. "Happyland" was released as the fourth single from the album on 2 February 2018.

== Track listing ==
No.	Title	Writer(s)	Producer(s)	Length
1.	"Glorious"	Måns Zelmerlöw; Jez Ashurst; Emma Rohan; Paddy Dalton; Phil Cook	Phil Cook	3:24
2.	"Beautiful Lie"	Zelmerlöw; Ashurst; Rohan; Dalton	Jez Ashurst	4:17
3.	"Happyland"	Joy Deb; Ola Svensson; Linnea Deb; Anton Hård af Segerstad	The Family	3:20
4.	"Round Round" (featuring Nabiha)	Moh Denebi; Josh Record; Ellen Tollbom	Moh Denebi	3:29
5.	"Whistleblower"	Zelmerlöw; Fredrik Sonefors; Alex Holmgren	Nicki Adamsson; Fredrik Sonefors	2:59
6.	"Hanging on to Nothing"	Zelmerlöw; Alexander Holmgren; Arvid Ångström; Isac Hördegård	Isac Hördegård	3:21
7.	"Renegades"	Zelmerlöw; Ashurst; Rohan; Dalton; Josh Record	Ashurst	3:41
8.	"Primal"	Zelmerlöw; Dalton; Cook; Jon Eyden	Cook	3:31
9.	"Fire in the Rain"	Simon Strömstedt; Sonefors	Sonefors	3:13
10.	"Wrong Decision"	Zelmerlöw; Dalton; Sonefors	Sonefors	4:18
Total length:				35:33

== Charts ==
Chart (2016)	Peak position
Belgian Albums (Ultratop Flanders)	159
Swedish Albums (Sverigetopplistan)	6

== Release history ==
Region	Date	Format	Label
Sweden	2 December 2016	Digital download; CD	Warner Music Sweden
