= One (Måns Zelmerlöw song) =

Single by Måns Zelmerlöw

from the album Time
- Released: 21 November 2019
- Length: 3:19
- Label: Warner Music Group
- Songwriters: Jon Eyden; Matthew Holmes; Phillip Leigh; Måns Zelmerlöw
- Producers: Mac & Phil

Måns Zelmerlöw singles chronology
"Better Now" (2019)	"One" (2019)	"Gamle Dager" (2020)

"One" is a song by Swedish singer Måns Zelmerlöw. The song was released as a digital download on 21 November 2019 through Warner Music Group as the third single from his eighth studio album Time. The song was written by Jon Eyden, Matthew Holmes, Phillip Leigh and Måns Zelmerlöw. The song did not enter the Swedish Singles Chart, but peaked at number 20 on the Sweden Heatseeker Songs Chart.

== Music video ==
A music video to accompany the release of "One" was first released onto YouTube on 21 November 2019. The music video was directed by Robin Ehlde. The video was shot in one take.

== Personnel ==
Credits adapted from Tidal.

- Mac & Phil – producer
- Jeremy Wheatley for 365 Artists – mixer
- Jon Eyden – writer
- Matthew Holmes – writer
- Måns Zelmerlöw – writer
- Phillip Leigh – writer

== Charts ==
Chart (2019)	Peak position
Sweden Heatseeker Songs (Sverigetopplistan)	20

== Release history ==
Region	Date	Format	Label
Sweden	21 November 2019	Digital download; streaming	Warner Music Group
