= Better Now (Måns Zelmerlöw song) =

Single by Måns Zelmerlöw

from the album Time
- Released: 17 May 2019
- Genre: Pop
- Length: 3:09
- Label: Warner Music Group
- Songwriter(s): Måns Zelmerlöw; Emma Rohan; Peter Mark Hammerton; Tom Mann
- Producer(s): Peter Hammerton; Pontus Persson

Måns Zelmerlöw singles chronology
"Walk with Me" (2019)	"Better Now" (2019)	"One" (2019)

"Better Now" is a song by Swedish singer Måns Zelmerlöw. The song was released as a digital download on 17 May 2019 through Warner Music Group as the second single from his eighth studio album Time. The song peaked at number 79 on the Swedish Singles Chart. The song was written by Måns Zelmerlöw, Emma Rohan, Peter Mark Hammerton and Tom Mann.

== Background ==
The song is about Zelmerlöw's dark past and it details how he fought to become a better person. The song is like a window to his soul. He wrote the song about his son Albert. Lyrically, he comes out as someone who is trying to be a good and non-judgemental father, "Don't grow up to be me, grow up to be you". He is undoubtedly encouraging his baby boy to become one of the heroes of his own time.

== Music video ==
A music video to accompany the release of "Better Now" was first released onto YouTube on 14 June 2019 at a total length of three minutes and ten seconds.

== Track listing ==
Digital download
No.	Title	Length
1.	"Better Now"	3:09

== Charts ==
Chart (2019)	Peak position
Sweden (Sverigetopplistan)	79

== Release history ==
Region	Date	Format	Label
Sweden	17 May 2019	Digital download; streaming	Warner Music Group
