= Barcelona Sessions =

Studio album by Måns Zelmerlöw
- Released: 5 February 2014
- Recorded: 2012–13
- Genre: Pop
- Length: 40:55
- Label: Warner Music Sweden

Måns Zelmerlöw chronology
Kära vinter (2011)	Barcelona Sessions (2014)	Perfectly Damaged (2015)

Singles from Barcelona Sessions
- 1. "Broken Parts" Released: 25 February 2013; 2. "Beautiful Life" Released: 13 September 2013; 3. "Run For Your Life" Released: 14 January 2014

Barcelona Sessions is the fifth studio album of Swedish singer Måns Zelmerlöw. It was released on 5 February 2014 in Sweden. The album peaked at number three on the Swedish Albums Chart and includes the singles "Broken Parts", "Beautiful Life" and "Run for Your Life"—though none of these singles placed in the Swedish charts.

== Singles ==
"Broken Parts" was released as the lead single from the album on 25 February 2013. "Beautiful Life" was released as the second single from the album on 13 September 2013. "Run for Your Life" was released as the third and final single from the album on 14 January 2014.

== Track listing ==
No.	Title	Writer(s)	Length
1.	"Run for Your Life"	Måns Zelmerlöw; Gavin Jones; Robert Habolin	3:37
2.	"Something About This Town"	Zelmerlöw; Jones; Habolin	3:19
3.	"Broken Parts"	Zelmerlöw; Jones; Habolin; Tobias Frelin	3:44
4.	"Children of the Sun"	Zelmerlöw; Johan Röhr; Moh Denebi; Sharon Vaughn	3:52
5.	"Beautiful Life"	Zelmerlöw; Jones; Habolin	3:40
6.	"Burning Stars"	Zelmerlöw; Röhr; Denebi; Vaughn	4:09
7.	"Waiting for the World to End"	Zelmerlöw; Jones; Habolin	3:43
8.	"Sleep on Roses"	Zelmerlöw; Jones; Habolin	3:23
9.	"Braver on the Outside"	Zelmerlöw; Röhr; Denebi; Vaughn	3:21
10.	"This One’s for You"	Zelmerlöw; Jones; Habolin	4:47
11.	"Parallels"	Zelmerlöw; Jones; Habolin	3:17
Total length:			40:55

== Charts ==
Chart (2014)	Peak position
Sweden (Sverigetopplistan)	3

== Release history ==
Region	Date	Label	Format
Sweden	5 February 2014	Warner Music Sweden	CD, digital download
