= Hanging on to Nothing =

Single by Måns Zelmerlöw

from the album Chameleon
- Released: 26 August 2016
- Recorded: 2015
- Genre: Pop
- Length: 3:21
- Label: Warner Music Group
- Songwriters: Måns Zelmerlöw; Alexander Holmgren; Arvid Ångström; Isac Hördegård
- Producer: Isac Hördegård

Måns Zelmerlöw singles chronology
"Belong" (2016)	"Hanging on to Nothing" (2016)	"Glorious" (2016)

"Hanging on to Nothing" is a song by Swedish singer Måns Zelmerlöw. The song was released as a digital download on 26 August 2016 through Warner Music Group as the second single from his seventh studio album Chameleon (2016). The song did not enter the Swedish Singles Chart, but peaked at 2 on the Sweden Heatseeker Songs. Zelmerlöw also released a bilingual English/French version titled "Rien que nous deux (Hanging on to Nothing)" aimed at French-speaking markets.

== Music video ==
A lyric video to accompany the release of "Hanging on to Nothing" was first released onto YouTube on 2 September 2016 at a total length of three minutes and twenty-one seconds. The music video for the track was released on 8 June 2017. It was filmed in Warsaw, Poland, and directed by Mikeadelica.

== Track listing ==
Digital download
No.	Title	Length
1.	"Hanging on to Nothing"	3:21

== Chart performance ==
=== Weekly charts ===
Chart (2016)	Peak position
Poland (Polish Airplay Top 100)	29
Sweden Heatseeker Songs (Sverigetopplistan)	2

== Release history ==
Region	Date	Format	Label
Sweden	26 August 2016	Digital download	Warner Music Group
