= Hope & Glory (song) =

Single by Måns Zelmerlöw

from the album MZW
- Released: 1 March 2009
- Recorded: 2008
- Genre: Pop; disco
- Length: 3:02
- Label: Warner Music Sweden
- Songwriters: Fredrik Kempe; Henrik Wikström; Måns Zelmerlöw
- Producers: Fredrik Kempe; Henrik Wikström

Måns Zelmerlöw singles chronology
"Miss America" (2008)	"Hope & Glory" (2009)	"Hold On" (2009)

"Hope & Glory" is a song recorded by Swedish singer Måns Zelmerlöw. It was released on 1 March 2009 in Sweden. It was released as the lead (second overall) single from his second studio album MZW (2009). The song served as his Melodifestivalen 2009 entry coming eventual 4th place behind Malena Ernman (1st), Caroline af Ugglas (2nd) and E.M.D. (3rd) respectively.

== History ==
On November 18, 2008, it was announced that Måns Zelmerlöw would, for the second time, compete in Melodifestivalen, Sweden's process to decide their Eurovision entry for that year. Måns entered with the song "Hope & Glory", co written by himself and Fredrik Kempe with music by Kempe and Henrik Wikström. Måns competed in the second semi final in Skellefteå on February 14, 2009, where he won first place after winning both rounds from this he progressed to the final in Stockholm where he came 4th with 144 combined points, Hope & Glory received the most points from the jury. The single was released digitally on February 25, 2009, one week before the album MZW and eventually peaked at number 1 on the official Swedish charts.

== Track listings ==
Digital download
No.	Title	Length
1.	"Hope & Glory"
2.	"Hope & Glory" (PJ Harmony Remix)
3.	"Hope & Glory" (Chainbreaker Remix by Holter & Erixson)
4.	"Hope & Glory" (Acoustic Version)

== Chart performance ==
The single debuted at number 22 on the Swedish Singles Chart but climbed to number 2 after the physical release in March 2009.

=== Weekly charts ===
Chart (2009)	Peak position
Sweden (Sverigetopplistan)	2

=== Year-end charts ===
Chart (2009)	Position
Sweden (Sverigetopplistan)	20

== Release history ==
Region	Date	Label	Format
Sweden	1 March 2009	Warner Music Sweden	Digital Download
Sweden	4 March 2009	Warner Music Sweden	CD
