= Fire in the Rain =

Single by Måns Zelmerlöw

from the album Perfectly Re:Damaged / Chameleon
- Released: 4 May 2016
- Recorded: 2016
- Genre: Pop
- Length: 3:13
- Label: Warner Music
- Songwriter(s): Simon Strömstedt; Fredrik Sonefors
- Producer(s): Fredrik Sonefors

Måns Zelmerlöw singles chronology
"Should've Gone Home" (2015)	"Fire in the Rain" (2016)	"Belong" (2016)

"Fire in the Rain" is a song by Swedish singer Måns Zelmerlöw. It was released on 4 May 2016 as the lead single from the re-issued version of Zelmerlöw's sixth studio album, Perfectly Damaged (2015), ahead of Zelmerlöw's duties as one of the Eurovision Song Contest 2016 hosts. The song was also released as the lead single from his seventh studio album Chameleon (2016). It premiered in a performance by Zelmerlöw during the final of Eurovision on 14 May. The song has peaked at number 31 on the Swedish Singles Chart and at number 3 in Poland.

== Music video ==
A lyric video to accompany the release of "Fire in the Rain" was first released onto YouTube on 5 May 2016 at a total length of three minutes and thirteen seconds. An official video to accompany the release of "Fire in the Rain" was first released onto YouTube on 12 May 2016 at a total length of three minutes and forty-two seconds.

== Track listing ==
Digital download
No.	Title	Length
1.	"Fire in the Rain"	3:13

CD single
No.	Title	Length
1.	"Fire in the Rain"	3:11
2.	"Should've Gone Home"	3:32

== Charts ==
=== Weekly charts ===
Chart (2016)	Peak position
Poland (Polish Airplay Top 100)	3
Slovakia (Rádio Top 100)	64
Sweden (Sverigetopplistan)	31

=== Year-end charts ===
Chart (2016)	Position
Poland (ZPAV)	12

== Certifications ==
Region	Certification	Certified units/sales
Poland (ZPAV)	Gold	10,000^{‡}
Sweden (GLF)	Platinum	40,000^{‡}
^{‡} Sales+streaming figures based on certification alone.

== Release history ==
Region	Date	Format	Label
Sweden	4 May 2016	Digital download	Warner Music Sweden
