= Heroes (Måns Zelmerlöw song) =

2015 song by Måns Zelmerlöw

Single by Måns Zelmerlöw

from the album Perfectly Damaged
- Released: 28 February 2015
- Genre: Dance-pop; electropop; house-pop
- Length: 3:11
- Label: Warner Music
- Songwriters: Anton Malmberg Hård af Segerstad; Joy Deb; Linnea Deb
- Producers: Joy Deb; Anton Malmberg Hård af Segerstad

Måns Zelmerlöw singles chronology
| "Run for Your Life" (2014) | "Heroes" (2015) | "Should've Gone Home" (2015) |

Music video
- "Heroes" on YouTube

Eurovision Song Contest 2015 entry
- Country: Sweden
- Artist: Måns Zelmerlöw
- Language: English
- Composers: Anton Malmberg Hård af Segerstad; Joy Deb; Linnea Deb
- Lyricists: Anton Malmberg Hård af Segerstad; Joy Deb; Linnea Deb

Finals performance
- Semi-final result: 1st
- Semi-final points: 217
- Final result: 1st
- Final points: 365

Entry chronology
- ◄ "Undo" (2014)
- "If I Were Sorry" (2016) ►

Official performance video
- "Heroes" (Semi-Final) on YouTube "Heroes" (Final) on YouTube "Heroes" (Reprise) on YouTube

"Heroes" is a song recorded by Swedish singer Måns Zelmerlöw written and composed by Anton Malmberg Hård af Segerstad, Joy Deb, and Linnea Deb. It was released on 28 February 2015 as a digital download in Sweden. It won the Melodifestivalen 2015 and represented Sweden in the Eurovision Song Contest 2015 held in Vienna, which it also won. It is the lead single for Zelmerlöw's sixth studio album Perfectly Damaged.

== Background ==
=== Conception ===
"Heroes" written and composed by Anton Malmberg Hård af Segerstad, Joy Deb, and Linnea Deb. It was recorded by Måns Zelmerlöw.

=== Melodifestivalen ===
As Zelmerlöw's third participation in the selection, "Heroes" participated in the fourth semi-final of the 2015 edition of the Melodifestivalen which was held in Örebro's Conventum Arena on 28 February 2015. The song was performed last at the fourth semi-final. It directly qualified to the final as it got one of the first two places.

Right after the second chance, the running order of the final was revealed with "Heroes" being performed at the sixth position. "Heroes" won the selection with 122 points from the international jury and 166 points from the public, receiving 288 points in total, a record under the current voting system. The entry also beat the second placed song with a record margin of 149 points.

As that Melodifestivalen was organised by Sveriges Television (SVT) to select its song and performer for the 60th edition of the Eurovision Song Contest, the song became the Swedish entrant, and Zelmerlöw the performer, for Eurovision.

=== Eurovision ===
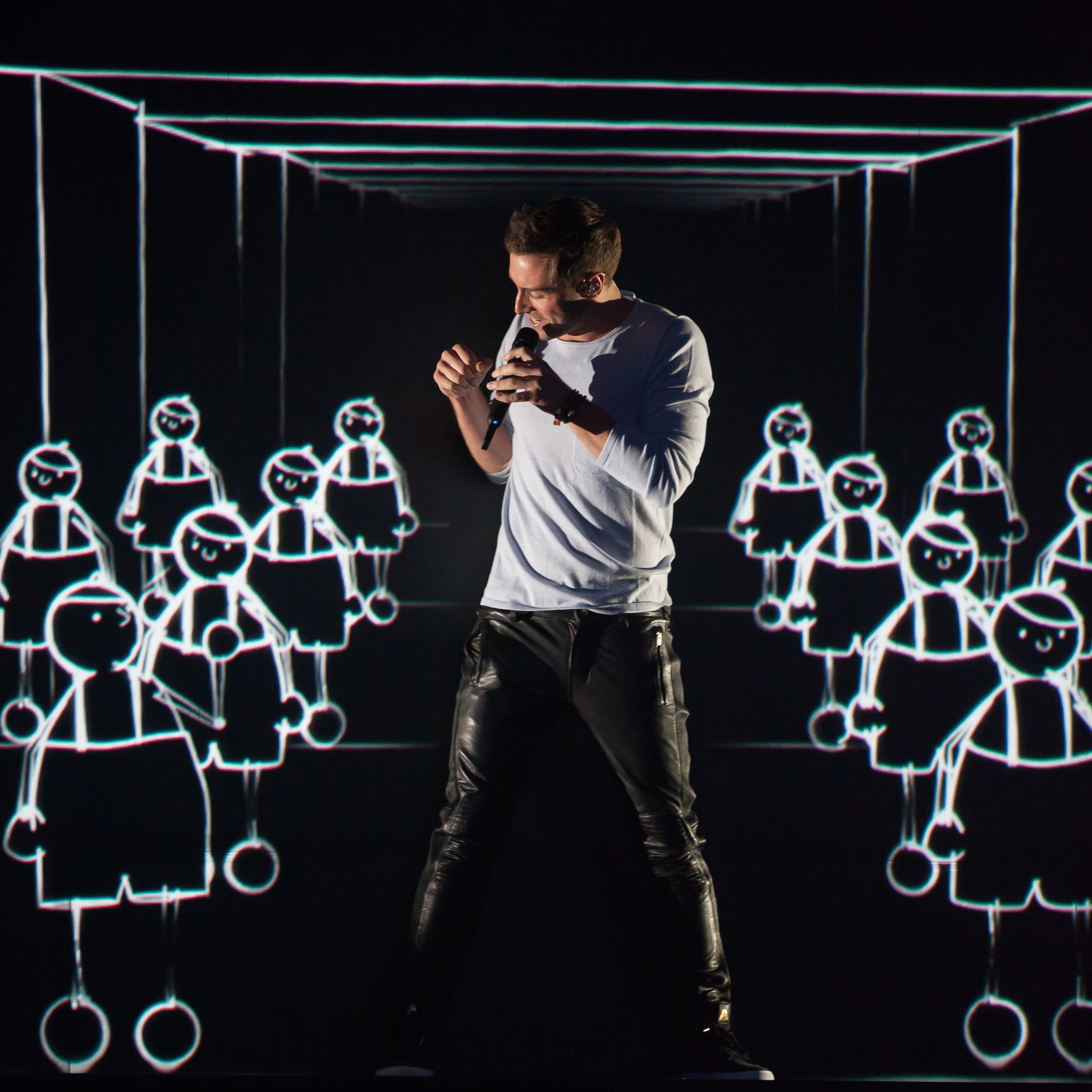
"Heroes" at Eurovision.

On 21 May 2015, the second semi-final of the Eurovision Song Contest was held in the Wiener Stadthalle (Hall D) in Vienna hosted by Österreichischer Rundfunk (ORF) and broadcast live throughout the continent. Zelmerlöw performed "Heroes" thirteenth on the evening. After the grand final it was revealed that it had received in its semi-final 217 points, placing first and qualifying for the grand final. On 23 May 2015, he performed the song again in the grand final tenth on the evening.

"Heroes" won the contest with a total of 365 points. It is the third-highest-scoring song in the history of the contest from 1975 to 2015 (and fifth-highest if results from 2016 are converted to the older system). It is also the first winning song, since the introduction of the split jury-televoting system in 2009, that has not won the televoting. "Heroes" defeated a record number of twenty-six other songs in the final, as it was the largest Eurovision Song Contest final ever with twenty-seven participating countries. "Heroes" received the highest percentage of possible points compared to any other Eurovision winner of the 2010 to 2019 decade.

=== Aftermath ===
As the winning broadcaster, the European Broadcasting Union (EBU) gave SVT the responsibility to host the following edition of the Eurovision Song Contest. The contest was co-host by Zelmerlöw himself, who opened the first semi-final on 10 May 2016 performing "Heroes". On 18 May 2019, in the 'Switch Song' interval act during the grand final of the Eurovision Song Contest 2019 held in Tel Aviv, Conchita Wurst performed "Heroes". On 22 May 2021, the interval act "Rock the Roof" in the Eurovision Song Contest 2021 grand final features "Heroes" performed by Zelmerlöw.

== Critical reception ==
Writing in The Independent, Kiran Moodley compared the song with David Guetta's "Lovers on the Sun", concluding "the resemblance is uncanny." Writing for the same outlet in 2022, Ben Kelly named it 36th best Eurovision-winning song of all time, describing it as "a David Guetta production with slightly underwhelming country-style verses".

== Track listings ==
Digital download / CD single
| No. | Title | Length |
|---|---|---|
| 1. | "Heroes" | 3:10 |

Digital download — Remixes
| No. | Title | Length |
|---|---|---|
| 1. | "Heroes" (B.o.Y Remix) | 3:44 |
| 2. | "Heroes" (7th Heaven Club Mix) | 6:30 |
| 3. | "Heroes" (Axento Extended Remix) | 5:09 |
| 4. | "Heroes" (Eray Oktav Remix) (Extended) | 5:28 |

== Chart history ==
=== Weekly charts ===
| Chart (2015) | Peak position |
|---|---|
| Australia (ARIA) | 19 |
| Austria (Ö3 Austria Top 40) | 1 |
| Belgium (Ultratop Flanders) | 2 |
| Belgium (Ultratop Wallonia) | 6 |
| CIS Airplay (TopHit) | 107 |
| Czech Republic (Rádio Top 100) | 69 |
| Denmark (Tracklisten) | 7 |
| Euro Digital Songs (Billboard) | 6 |
| Finland (Suomen virallinen lista) | 5 |
| France (SNEP) | 33 |
| Germany (Official German Charts) | 3 |
| Greece Digital Songs (Billboard) | 1 |
| Hungary (Single Top 40) | 12 |
| Hungary (Stream Top 40) | 19 |
| Iceland (RÚV) | 1 |
| Ireland (IRMA) | 10 |
| Israel International Airplay (Media Forest) | 2 |
| Italy (FIMI) | 87 |
| Luxembourg Digital Songs (Billboard) | 3 |
| Netherlands (Single Top 100) | 12 |
| Norway (VG-lista) | 4 |
| Poland Airplay (ZPAV) | 5 |
| Romania (Airplay 100) | 58 |
| Russia (2M) | 3 |
| Scottish Singles Sales (Official Charts) | 7 |
| Slovakia (Rádio Top 100) | 48 |
| Slovenia (SloTop50) | 2 |
| Spain (PROMUSICAE) | 3 |
| Sweden (Sverigetopplistan) | 1 |
| Switzerland (Schweizer Hitparade) | 1 |
| Turkey (Number One Top 40) | 3 |
| UK Singles (Official Charts) | 11 |

=== Year-end charts ===
| Chart (2015) | Position |
|---|---|
| Austria (Ö3 Austria Top 40) | 42 |
| Belgium (Ultratop Flanders) | 53 |
| Poland (ZPAV) | 36 |
| Spain (PROMUSICAE) | 80 |
| Sweden (Sverigetopplistan) | 15 |

=== Certifications ===
| Region | Certification | Certified units/sales |
|---|---|---|
| Austria (IFPI Austria) | Gold | 15,000^{‡} |
| Denmark (IFPI Danmark) | Gold | 45,000^{‡} |
| Norway (IFPI Norway) | Gold | 20,000^{‡} |
| Poland (ZPAV) | Gold | 25,000^{‡} |
| Spain (Promusicae) | Platinum | 40,000^{‡} |
| Sweden (GLF) | 5× Platinum | 200,000^{‡} |
^{‡} Sales+streaming figures based on certification alone.

== Release history ==
| Country | Date | Format | Label |
|---|---|---|---|
| Denmark | 28 February 2015 | Digital download | Warner Music |
| Finland | 28 February 2015 | Digital download | Warner Music |
| Norway | 28 February 2015 | Digital download | Warner Music |
| Sweden | 28 February 2015 | Digital download | Warner Music Sweden |
| United Kingdom | 28 February 2015 | Digital download | Warner Music |
| Australia | 28 February 2015 | Digital download | Warner Music |
| Italy | 9 March 2015 | Digital download | Warner Music |

| Preceded by "Rise Like a Phoenix" by Conchita Wurst | Eurovision Song Contest winners 2015 | Succeeded by "1944" by Jamala |
