= Cara Mia (Måns Zelmerlöw song) =

2007 Måns Zelmerlöw song

Single by Måns Zelmerlöw

from the album Stand By For...
- Released: March 5, 2007
- Recorded: 2006
- Genre: Pop
- Length: 3:06; 3:30 (music video)
- Label: Warner Music Sweden
- Songwriter(s): Fredrik Kempe; Henrik Wikström
- Producer(s): Henrik Wikström; Koshiar Mehdipoor

Måns Zelmerlöw singles chronology
"Cara Mia" (2007)	"Work of Art (Da Vinci)" (2007)

Music video
- "Cara Mia" on YouTube

"Cara Mia" is a song recorded by Swedish singer Måns Zelmerlöw. It was released as the first single from Zelmerlöw's debut album Stand by For... in Sweden on February 28, 2007, digitally and later released as a CD single. The song served as Måns' Melodifestivalen 2007 entry coming eventual 3rd place behind winners The Ark and runner-up Andreas Johnson. The song has been certified 2× platinum in Sweden.

== History ==
On February 17, 2007, Måns competed in the 3rd semi-final of Melodifestivalen 2007 in Örnsköldsvik with the song "Cara Mia", where he qualified for the final in Stockholm on March 10, at which he won 3rd place in the contest. The single was released digitally in February 2007 and physically a few days later entering the Swedish Singles Chart at number 9 but quickly climbing the charts to number 1 where it spent 4 consecutive weeks, with a total of 36 weeks on the chart and being certified 2× platinum by IFPI. A video clip has been filmed for the single, shots of which can be seen in the last pages of Måns' album booklet for Stand by For....

== Music video ==
The music video was released on May 2007. The video shows Måns waiting for his girlfriend.

== Track listings ==
Digital download
No.	Title	Length
1.	"Cara Mia"	3:04
2.	"Cara Mia" (PJ Harmony Day Remix)	3:22
3.	"Cara Mia" (PJ Harmony at Nite Remix)	3:43
4.	"Cara Mia" (Perra Dance Remix)	4:04
5.	"Cara Mia" (Acoustic Version)	4:02

- The acoustic version of "Cara Mia" appears as a hidden track on the album Stand By For...

== Chart performance ==
The single debuted at number 9 on the Swedish Singles Chart but climbed to number 1 after the physical release in March 2007.

=== Weekly charts ===
Chart (2007)	Peak position
Finland (Suomen virallinen lista)	4
Sweden (Sverigetopplistan)	1

=== Year-end charts ===
Chart (2007)	Position
Sweden (Sverigetopplistan)	3

=== Certifications ===
Region	Certification	Certified units/sales
Sweden (GLF)	Platinum	40,000^{^}
^{^} Shipments figures based on certification alone.

== Release history ==
The single was released officially in Sweden as a digital download and then as a CD single 5 days later. The song was only released digitally in Poland and Finland. The song was never officially released in Bulgaria but charted there from download sales only.

Region	Label	Date	Format
Sweden	Warner Music Sweden	March 5, 2007	Digital download
Sweden	Warner Music Sweden	March 5, 2007	CD
Finland	Warner Music	July 2007	Digital download
Poland	Warner Music	August 6, 2007	Digital download

== Cover versions ==
- Russian singer Philip Kirkorov recorded a remake of this song and named it "Queen".
- Slovenian singer Jan Vehar did a cover of a song back in 2015
- Swedish duo Norlie & KKV did a cover of the song on Så mycket bättre in 2022
