= Pernilla Andersson =

Swedish singer-songwriter

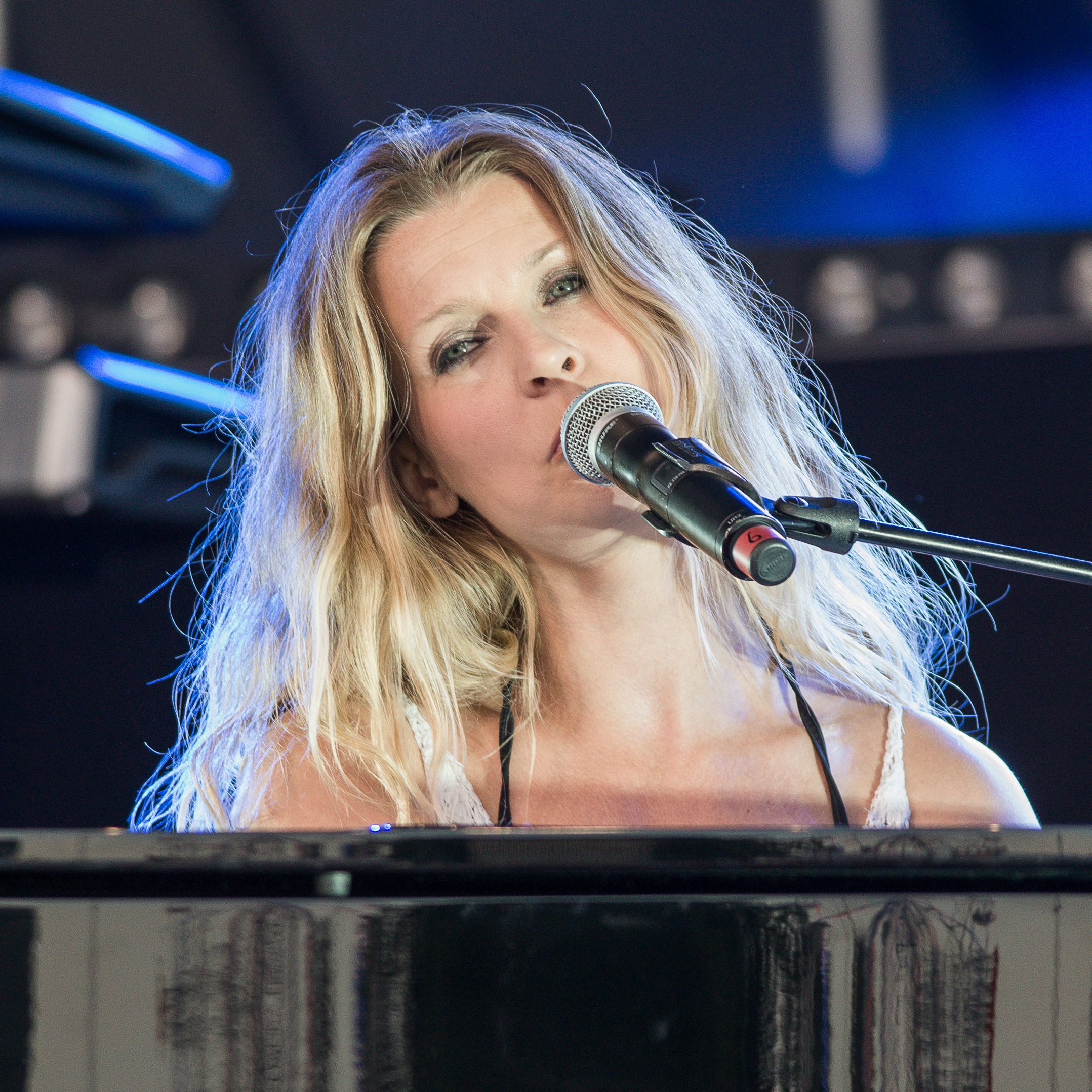
- Andersson in 2014

Background information
- Genre: singer-songwriter
- Occupations: musician, composer
- Instruments: Vocals, piano, guitar
- Years active: 1999–present
- Labels: EMI, Bonnier Amigo, Warner Music, Metronome

Pernilla Andersson is a Swedish musician, composer and record producer.

== Career ==
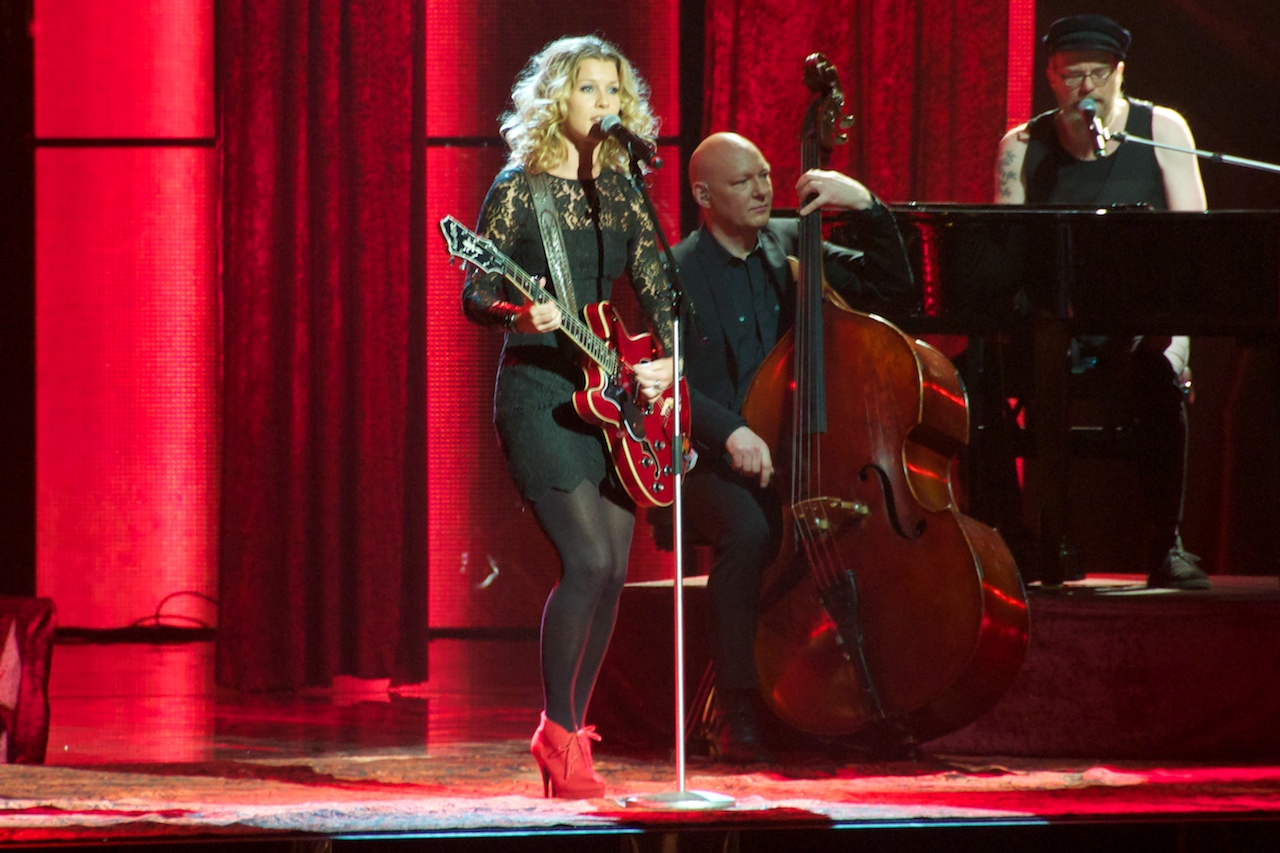
Andersson at Melodifestivalen 2011

Born to parents who were musicians and teachers, Andersson began playing instruments at an early age. She studied at the Ballet Academy in Gothenburg but left to pursue music. She later earned a master's degree from the Royal College of Music in Stockholm and released her debut album in 1999.

As a record producer, Andersson co-wrote and produced Svante Thuresson's "Nya kickar" for Capitol/EMI (2002) and "Svante Thuresson & vänner" for Parlophone/EMI (2007). Thuresson was nominated for a Grammis in 2003. In 2008 Andersson co-founded Sheriff Records which released music by Titiyo and Staffan Hellstrand as well as Mean Streets and Thuresson.

She has toured extensively, both with her own shows and as an opening act for Eagles, Bryan Ferry and Katie Melua. Andersson performed "Desperados" in Melodifestivalen 2011 and "Mitt guld" in 2016. Over the years she has received Grammis nominations for Composer of the Year, Female Artist of the Year and Folk Music/Singer-Songwriter of the Year. In 2013 Andersson recved the Sir George Martin Award.

In 2025 Andersson composed the original score for the feature film Regnmannen. Her song "Roses" is featured during the end credits. Both "Roses" and its Swedish version "Rosor" appeared on Svensktoppen.

Andersson has mentored students at the Royal College of Music in Stockholm and helped secure external funding for its programme promoting equality in music. As a keen angler, she has also supported the efforts to protect fish and waterways, including the initiative Ge fan i våra vatten.

== Discography ==
=== Albums ===
Year	Album	Chart positions	Certification
Year	Album	SWE	Certification
1999	My Journey	–	
2000	All Smiles	–	
2004	Cradlehouse	–	
2007	Baby Blue	19	
2008	Gör dig till hund	34	
2009	Ashbury Apples	25	
2010	Ö	5	
2012	Det är en spricka i allt det är så ljuset kommer in	2	
2016	Tiggrinnan	5	
2021	Samma dag som Elvis	18	

=== Singles ===
Year	Single	Chart positions	Album
Year	Single	SWE	Album
2011	"Desperados"	57	
