= Måns Zelmerlöw =

Swedish singer and TV presenter (born 1986)

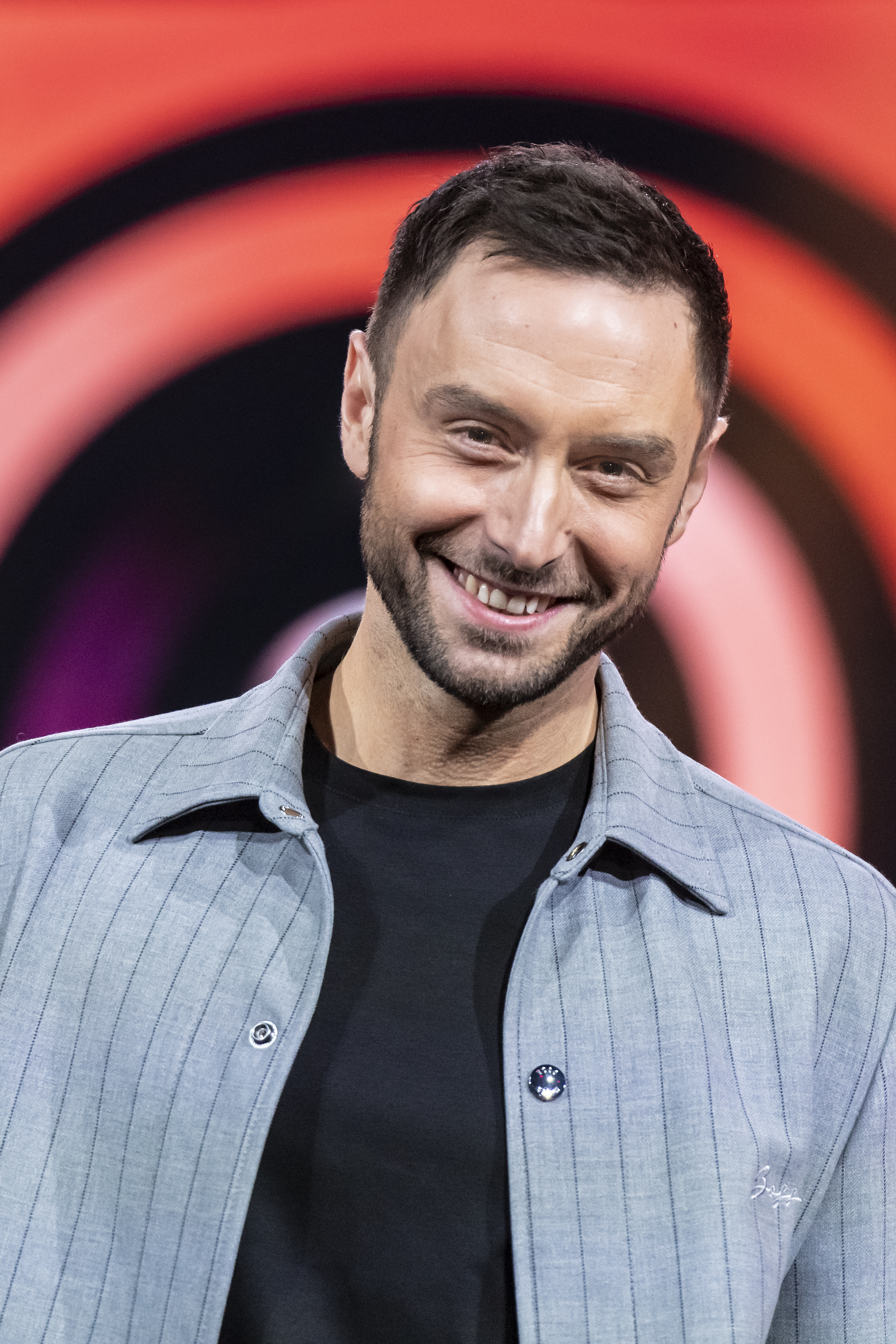
- Zelmerlöw at Melodifestivalen 2025
- Born: Måns Petter Albert Sahlén Zelmerlöw; 13 June 1986 (age 40); Lund, Sweden
- Occupations: Singer; songwriter; television presenter; model; actor
- Spouse: Ciara Janson (m. 2019; sep. 2025)
- Children: 2
- Mother: Birgitta Sahlén
- Musical career
- Genres: Pop
- Years active: 2005–present
- Label: Warner Music Sweden
- Member of: Björnzone
- Website: manszelmerlow.se

Måns Petter Albert Sahlén Zelmerlöw (Swedish: [ˈmɔnːs ˈsɛ̂lmɛˌɭøːv]; born 13 June 1986) is a Swedish singer and television presenter. He took part in Idol 2005, eventually finishing fifth, won the first season of Let's Dance, and scored a hit with his 2007 song "Cara Mia", which was his entry in that year's Melodifestivalen. Zelmerlöw was the host of Allsång på Skansen from 2011 to 2013. He participated in Melodifestivalen three more times: in 2009, 2015, and 2025; his 2015 win with "Heroes" led him to represent Sweden in the Eurovision Song Contest 2015, which he won as well.

== Early life and education ==
Born in Lund in the province of Scania, in southern Sweden, Måns Zelmerlöw is the son of Birgitta Sahlén, a professor at Lund University, and surgeon Sven-Olof Zelmerlöw. He is partly of Danish descent, with a grandmother from Hillerød. Zelmerlöw studied music in high school in Lund and was part of a school choir project. In 2002, he played one of the brothers in the musical Joseph and the Amazing Technicolor Dreamcoat at Slagthuset in Malmö.

== Career ==
=== 2005: Idol ===
Zelmerlöw first entered the public eye in 2005, when he took part in season 2 of the Swedish version of Idol, which was broadcast on TV4. He came in fifth place overall, and was eliminated on 11 November after eight weeks on the show. He had placed in the bottom three once and the bottom two twice.

Idol series 2 performances and results
| Week | Theme | Song choice | Original artist | Result |
|---|---|---|---|---|
| Audition | —N/a | "Hero" | Enrique Iglesias | Advanced |
| Heat 2 | —N/a | "Flying Without Wings" | Westlife | Advanced |
| Week 1 | My Own Idol | "Millennium" | Robbie Williams | Safe |
| Week 2 | 80s | "The Look" | Roxette | Bottom three |
| Week 3 | Swedish Hits | "Astrologen" | Magnus Uggla | Safe |
| Week 4 | Pop Hits | "Escape" | Enrique Iglesias | Bottom two |
| Week 5 | Disco | "Relight My Fire" | Dan Hartman | Safe |
| Week 6 | Cocktail | It's Not Unusual" | Tom Jones | Safe |
| Week 7 | Rock | "Beautiful Day" | U2 | Eliminated |
| Week 7 | Rock | "The Reason" | Hoobastank | Eliminated |

=== 2006: Let's Dance ===
Zelmerlöw took part in the first season of Let's Dance in 2006, partnering with Maria Karlsson. They won the competition, defeating singer Anna Book in the final.

In the same year, he also appeared in the Swedish version of the musical Grease, playing the lead role of Danny Zuko. As a result, Zelmerlöw signed a record deal to release a solo album with M&L Records, a division of Warner Music Sweden.

=== 2007–2008: Melodifestivalen and Stand by For... ===
In November 2006, it was announced that Zelmerlöw would compete in Melodifestivalen 2007, Sweden's national final for the Eurovision Song Contest 2007, to be held in Helsinki, Finland. He competed with the song "Cara Mia" in the third semi-final on 17 February 2007 in Örnsköldsvik, and progressed to the final, which was held on 10 March at Globen in Stockholm. There his performance of "Cara Mia" finished in third place behind winners The Ark and runner-up Andreas Johnson. "Cara Mia" was released as a single and Zelmerlöw's debut album Stand by For... followed shortly after. The album reached number one in Sweden and was certified platinum by IFPI. Four singles were released from the album, all of which reached the top 50 in Sweden. Stand by For... was also released in Poland in September 2007.

On 5 October 2007, Zelmerlöw was the presenter of Lilla Melodifestivalen on SVT. He also participated in the musical version of Footloose, playing Tommy. The musical was performed in both Gothenburg and Stockholm. In 2008, he participated in the Diggiloo tour along with singers Lasse Holm, Linda Bengtzing, Lotta Engberg, Thomas Pettersson, Molly Sandén and Nanne Grönvall.

=== 2009: Melodifestivalen and MZW ===
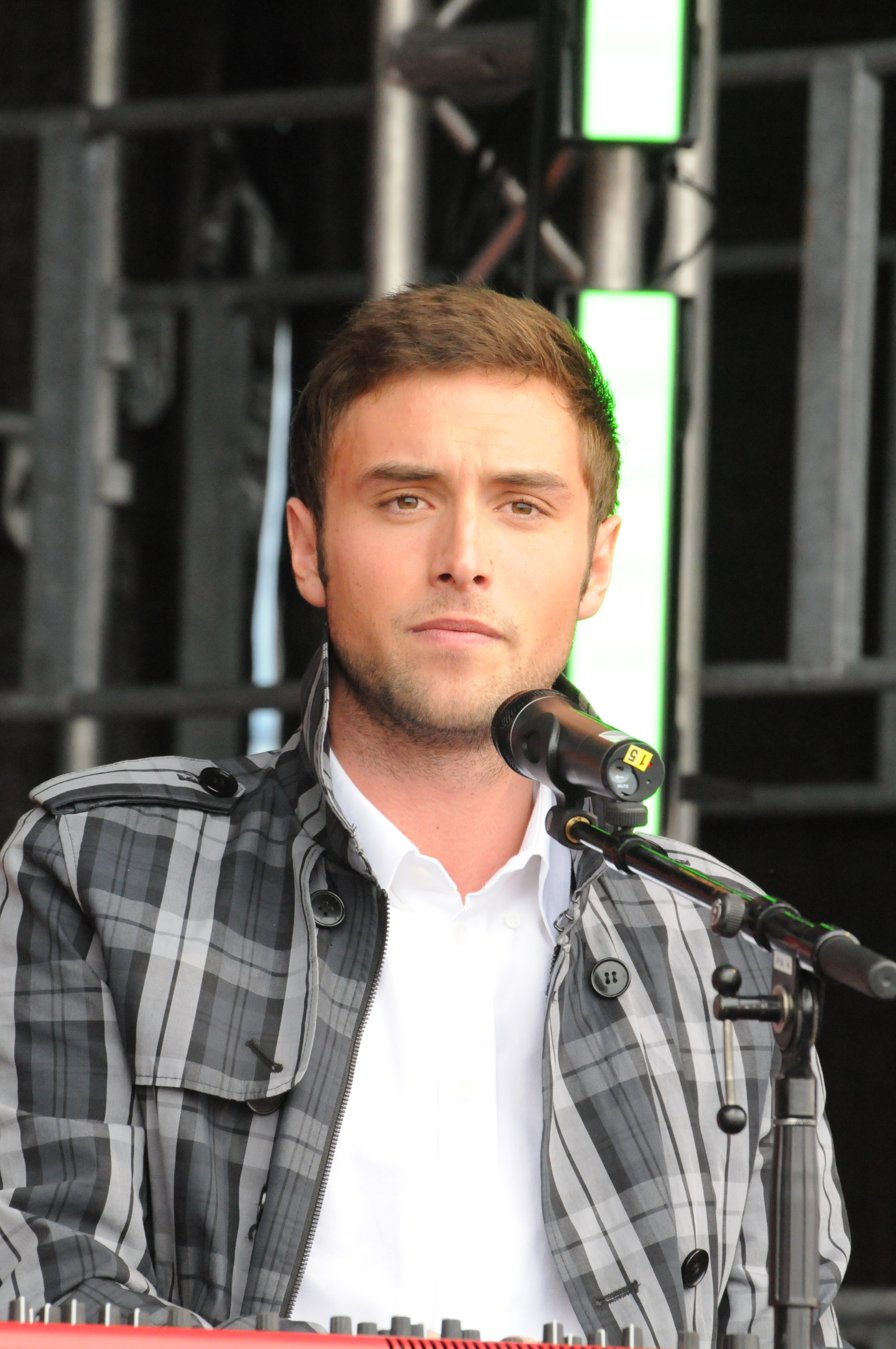
Zelmerlöw performing in 2009

On 18 November 2008, it was announced that Zelmerlöw would again compete in Melodifestivalen, this time with the song "Hope & Glory". The 2009 contest featured many former entrants, including Sarah Dawn Finer, Sofia, BWO and Amy Diamond. He took part in the second semi-final on 14 February 2009, and again progressed to the final on 14 March at Globen. "Hope & Glory" ultimately placed fourth, despite receiving the most votes from the jury.

In 2008, Zelmerlöw went back to the studio to work on his second solo album, MZW, which was released in late March 2009. It was certified gold by the IFPI and reached number one on the Swedish album charts. The album was also released in Poland. In 2009 he played a summer tour of Sweden performing songs from both albums.

=== 2010–2011: hosting Melodifestivalen and Allsång på Skansen ===
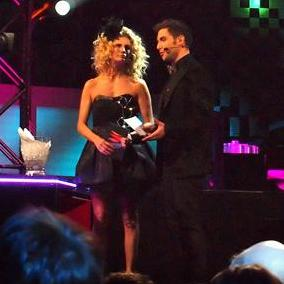
Christine Meltzer and Måns Zelmerlöw at Melodifestivalen 2010

On 10 November 2009, it was announced that Zelmerlöw would host Melodifestivalen 2010, alongside Dolph Lundgren and Christine Meltzer. He hosted the first semi-final and the final with Lundgren and Meltzer, and the remaining semi-finals with only Meltzer. In the opening of the Second Chance round, he performed the Duran Duran song "A View to a Kill", and in the final he sang the Survivor song "Eye of the Tiger" with his fellow presenters. He also acted as Romeo in the musical Romeo and Juliet, and guest starred in the talent show Jakten på Julia at SVT, where Lisette Pagler won the role as Juliet. The musical had its premiere in December at Göta Lejon.

In January 2011, Zelmerlöw was announced as the replacement for Anders Lundin as presenter of Allsång på Skansen, broadcast on SVT. He also presented the show in 2012.

=== 2013–2014: Barcelona Sessions ===
In March 2013, Zelmerlöw revealed plans for his third studio album, Barcelona Sessions, unveiling a new single, "Broken Parts". He also performed a new track on Swedish television called "Run for Your Life". In September 2013, Zelmerlöw unveiled the second single from the new album, called "Beautiful Life", and performed another album track entitled "Parallels". The album was released on 5 February 2014, preceded by "Run for Your Life".

In the summer of 2013, Zelmerlöw presented Allsång på Skansen on SVT and revealed that he was leaving the show in the final programme on 13 August. Singer Petra Marklund replaced him.

Zelmerlöw participated as a songwriter in Melodifestivalen 2013, co-writing the song "Hello Goodbye", performed by singers Erik Segerstedt and Tone Damli. The song made it to the second-chance round. In late 2013, he had the lead role in the new version of the Swedish musical Spök along with Loa Falkman, Sussie Eriksson and Lena Philipsson.

=== 2015–2016: Eurovision Song Contest and Perfectly Damaged ===
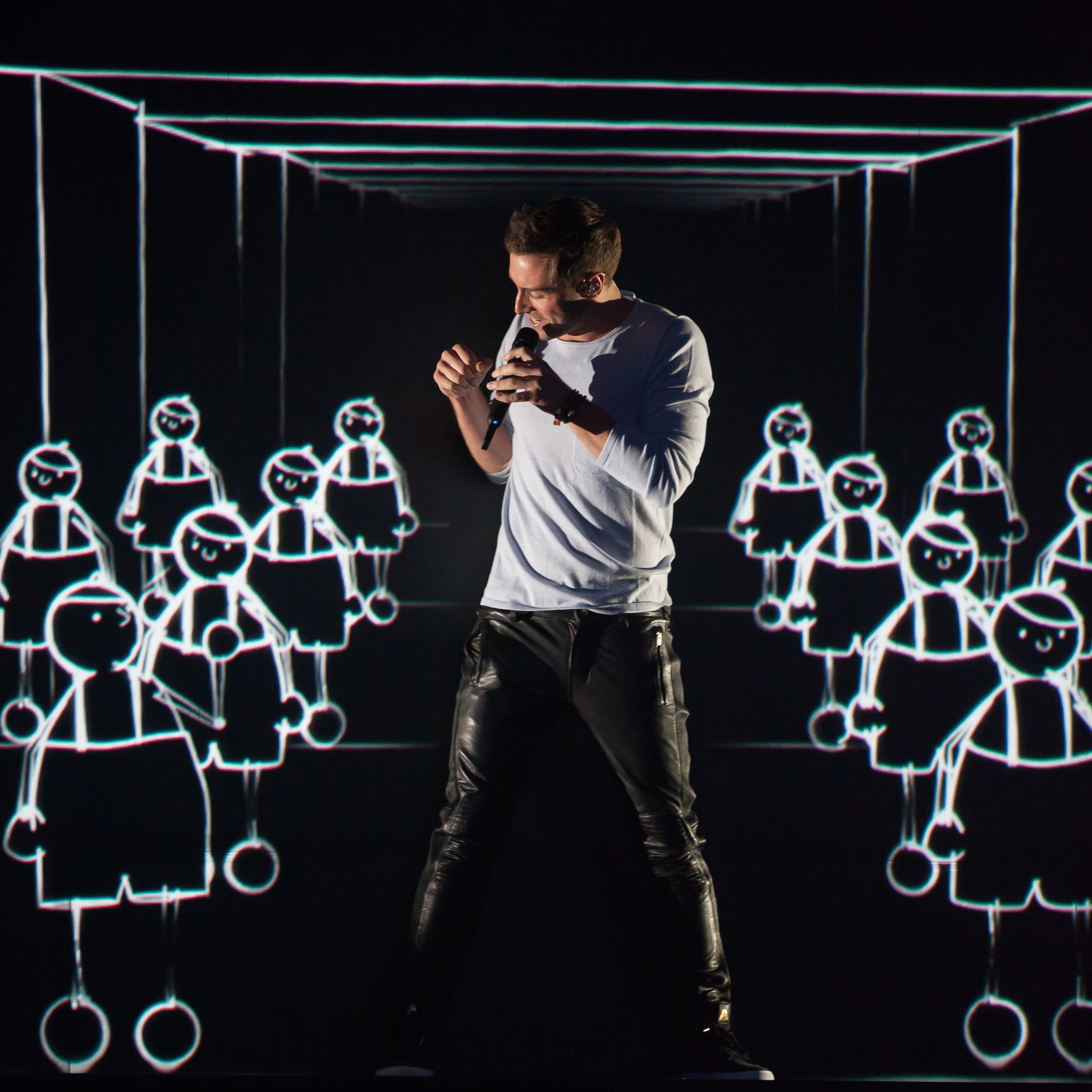
Zelmerlöw performing "Heroes" at the Eurovision Song Contest 2015

In 2015, Zelmerlöw again participated in Melodifestivalen with the song "Heroes", which scored 288 points and won the final. In the same festival, he co-wrote the entry "Det rår vi inte för", which was performed by Behrang Miri, and which made it to the second-chance round.

On 11 May 2015, Zelmerlöw revealed the artwork and track list for his fourth studio album Perfectly Damaged, which was released on 5 June 2015. On 17 May, Zelmerlöw performed the song "Heroes" in Belgrade during the first live show of X Factor Adria.

Leading up to the Eurovision Song Contest 2015, Zelmerlöw was predicted as the winner by the majority of the betting companies. Zelmerlöw participated in the second semifinal on 21 May, where he came first with 217 points (receiving the highest score from a record 14 countries) and qualified for the final. Zelmerlöw won the Eurovision 2015 final, scoring 365 points.

Throughout the summer of 2015, he made several appearances at music festivals in Sweden and Finland before embarking on a 17-date European tour in September. According to his Twitter and Instagram, before the European tour, he would make his way to Shanghai, China for a visit, promoting his latest album "Perfectly Damaged".

In the end of January 2016, Zelmerlöw travelled to Australia and sang at Guy Sebastian's 28 date Concert Tour "You..Me..Us Tour" as a surprise guest artist. Zelmerlöw and his band performed at two dates to the delight of Australian audiences who attended Jupiters Hotel and Casino, Gold Coast and regional Grafton to see the Guy Sebastian show.

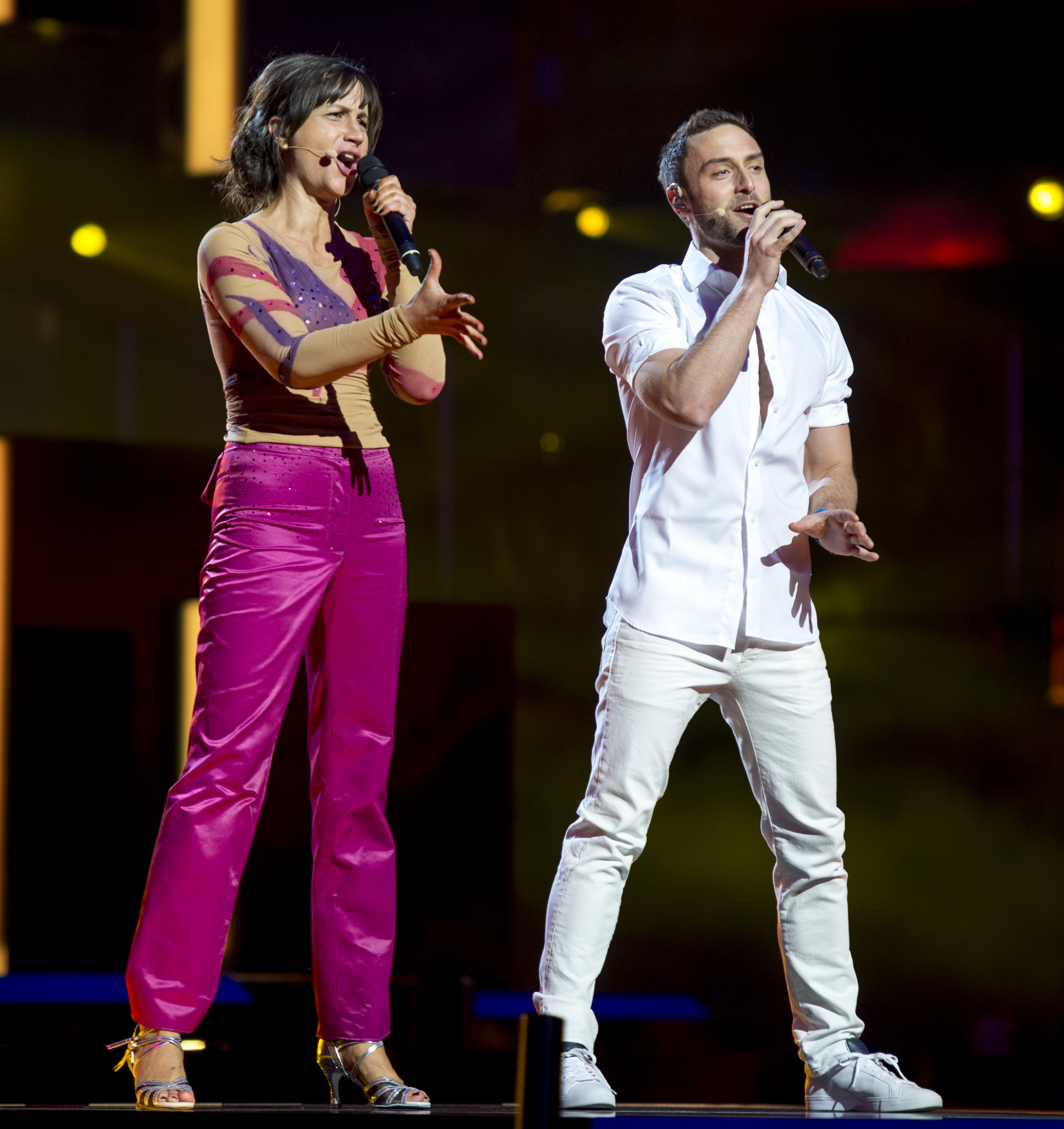
Interval act 'Love Love Peace Peace' with Petra Mede and Måns Zelmerlöw during Eurovision Song Contest 2016

In May 2016, he co-hosted Eurovision Song Contest 2016 in Stockholm with Swedish TV presenter Petra Mede. During the three shows Måns performed his winning song "Heroes", his new song "Fire in the Rain", and two musical sketches both co-written with Edward af Sillén, "Story of ESC" and the acclaimed "Love, Love, Peace, Peace" with Petra Mede.

In October 2016, he was featured in the TV series Chevaleresk with host Alexander Wiberg. It was broadcast on TV6.

=== 2016–2018: Chameleon ===
Zelmerlöw's seventh studio album, Chameleon, was released in December 2016. The lead single "Hanging on to Nothing", had been released the previous August. The song failed to chart on the Official Swedish Singles chart, but peaked at number 2 on the Heatseekers chart. On 5 November 2016 the French version of "Hanging on to Nothing" was released titled "Rien que nous deux" ("Only the two of us" in English).

In 2017, Zelmerlöw was the co-commentator for SVT at the Eurovision Song Contest 2017 alongside Edward af Sillén, Zelmerlöw also appeared in a sketch involving the three hosts; Oleksandr Skichko, Volodymyr Ostapchuk, and Timur Miroshnychenko.

On 16 November 2017, it was announced that Zelmerlöw would co-host BBC's Eurovision: You Decide with Mel Giedroyc on 7 February 2018 at the Brighton Dome. He opened the show with a medley of ABBA hits, duetting with UK Eurovision entrant Lucie Jones.

In 2018 his song "Happyland", released on the Chameleon album, was chosen by confectionery company Kinder to celebrate its 50th anniversary through commercials broadcast in European countries such as Germany and Italy.

=== 2019–2022: Time ===
In February 2019, Zelmerlöw once again co-hosted BBC's Eurovision: You Decide alongside Mel Giedroyc. As show act both presented the musical history of the best British ESC moments.

On 1 March 2019 Zelmerlöw and Swedish singer Dotter released the song Walk With Me.

Zelmerlöw announced in May 2019 that he would release the songs Better Now and Grow Up to Be You.

As part of the Eurovision Song Contest 2019 interval act, he covered his favourite entry of 2018, "Fuego", by Eleni Foureira, whilst the Greek singer covered "Dancing Lasha Tumbai" and Conchita covered his song "Heroes", before the acts convened for a version of "Hallelujah". Måns released his version of "Fuego" on iTunes, where the mention of the word "pelican" is removed due to the possible reference to the female anatomy.

On 18 October 2019 Zelmerlöw released his eighth studio album, Time. As a third single, the song One has been released on 21 November 2019 for digital download.

In November and December 2019 Zelmerlöw was seen in the Christmas show "The Grand Wonderland Show", which was held at the Grand Hôtel Stockholm.

Zelmerlöw was part of the jury of Eurovision: Australia Decides 2020 and also performed the single Walk With Me, which has been re-released with Australian singer Dami Im on 6 February 2020.

At Melodifestivalen 2020, Zelmerlöw sang the song 'Nygammal Vals' as a duet with Lill Lindfors in the show Andra Chansen, and he was also admitted into the Melodifestivalen Hall Of Fame.

Zelmerlöw and Morgan Sulele released the Single Gamle Dager on 10 April 2020. The song contains Norwegian and Swedish lyrics.

As the fourth single from Zelmerlöw's album Time the song On My Way has been released on 24 April 2020.

In the winter of 2020, Zelmerlöw and Per Andersson did a Christmas show together called Tomen och Bocken - En slags julshow at Hamburger Börs directed by Edward af Sillén who he had previous worked with on Melodifestivalen and Eurovision, but because of the COVID-19 pandemic only a few days of the show was able to be done before it had to be cancelled.

In 2021, he teamed up with fellow Eurovision 2015 contestant Polina Gagarina to record the official song for the World Figure Skating Championships 2021. Released on 21 February 2021, the single was called Circles and Squares.

Due to the pandemic, Melodifestivalen 2021 was held differently than usual, without an audience and with all 6 shows from Stockholm. There were separate presenters for each show. The final on 16 March 2021 was hosted by Måns Zelmerlöw, Shima Niavarani and Christer Björkman. Zelmerlöw also presented his single 'Come Over Love' as an interval act.

Since 26 March 2021, Swedish television TV4 has broadcast a season of Masked Singer Sverige every year in 4 seasons with 9 episodes each. The 4 permanent members of the guessing panel are Måns Zelmerlöw, Pernilla Wahlgren, Felix Herngren and Nour El Refai. These were occasionally supplemented by guest appearances by other celebrities. The show has been hosted by David Hellenius since the beginning. A particular highlight of the show was the Viking's mask in the third season, behind which Zelmerlöw's wife hid without him having any idea.

At the Eurovision Song Contest 2021, Zelmerlöw appeared alongside other former winners, such as Lordi, in the interval act 'Rock The Roof'.

In autumn 2022 Zelmerlöw took part in the Swedish television show "Så Mycket Bättre", in which various singers interpret each other's songs. It was recorded on Gotland back in June. Måns guest-starred in 5 of the episodes and provided 4 new songs as his own renditions: "Faller (Tell Her)" by Molly Hammar, "Sober (Mer För Varandra)" by Norlie & KKV, "Hatar Dig" by Daniela Rathana and "This Is The One" by Anna Ternheim.

Zelmerlöw and also Swedish Eurovision star Carola went on a big X-Mas tour named "A Grand X-mas" in November and December 2022 to 11 big arenas in cities across Sweden. Together with a 13-headed band and choir, the two performed a mixture of modern and classic Christmas songs in English and Swedish, as well as their own (Christmas) songs. As a special encore, the two sang their ESC winning titles 'Heroes' and 'Främling' in a joint ballad. The pair's Christmas song "Let's Sing (It's Christmas Time) ' was released as a single in advance on 11 November 2022.

=== 2023–present: Nightcaps EP and Melodifestivalen return ===
January 2023, Zelmerlöw took on a presenter role alongside Pernilla Wiberg. He hosted Idrottsgalan, a major Swedish sports gala, aired live from the Avicii Arena in Stockholm on SVT1 on 16 January 2023.

In 2023, as part of the lead-up for the Eurovision Song Contest 2023 set to be held in Liverpool, he was a co-presenter of the weekly BBC Sounds podcast Eurovisioncast on BBC Radio 5. Zelmerlöw, Nina Warhurst, Daniel Rosney and Ngunan Adamu hosted the podcast, which provided further information and interviews about the ESC. Zelmerlöw was also involved in the two semifinals of the ESC, each time in a quiz match against Filomena Cautela. As in 2017, he commentated on the final together with Edward af Sillén for Swedish television SVT.

On 13 October 2023, a complete EP by Zelmerlöw and his band 'The Agreement' was released for the first time: 'Nightcaps'. This contains all three previously released singles 'Andetag', 'Running Low' and 'Perfectly Damaged' as well as two additional songs 'History' and 'Side Effects'.

In winter 2023, Zelmerlöw did not only release the Christmas single "Christmas Christmas Everywhere", but also reunited with comedian Per Andersson. Both returned and toured Sweden with the sequel to Tomten och Bocken, a new show named "Tomten och Bocken Rider Igen", directed by Klas Wiljergård.

January 2024 Zelmerlöw again hosted the 25th anniversary of the Idrottsgalan, the Swedish sports gala, alongside Carolina Klüft, which was aired live from Stockholm.

In March 2024, Zelmerlöw appeared as a guest performer at the Melodifestivalen final, this time as a member of Björn Gustafsson's parody boy band Björnzone, performing "Still the One" with host Carina Berg. Other members were Eric Saade, Loa Falkman, Filip Berg, Adam Lundgren, Casper Jarnebrink, Victor Leksell, Boris René and Ulrik Munther. Björnzone released the Christmas single "A Christmas Song" on 29 November.

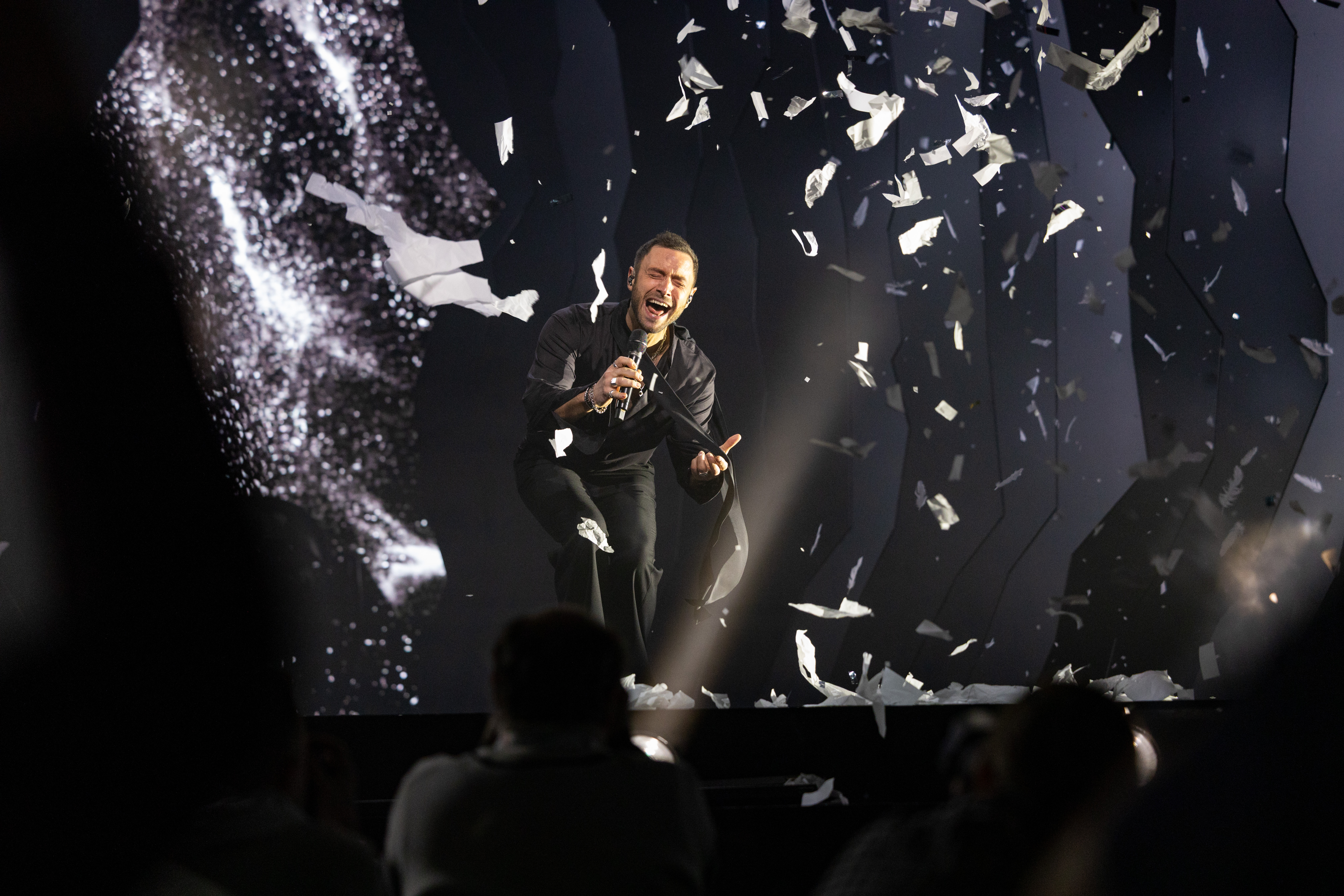
Zelmerlöw during his performance in Melodifestivalen 2025.

In late November 2024, Zelmerlöw was announced as one of the participants of Melodifestivalen 2025, ten years after his victory with "Heroes" and in his 20th anniversary year as an artist. He competed in the fourth heat on 22 February 2025 in Malmö with the song "Revolution" and qualified directly to the final on 8 March. In the finale he finished in second place, behind the winner KAJ.

== Personal life ==
Zelmerlöw has one younger sister. In his spare time, he enjoys padel, football, tennis and golf.

On 26 December 2004, Zelmerlöw and his family survived the Indian Ocean earthquake while on holiday in Khao Lak, Thailand.

In March 2014, while a guest on Swedish cooking show Pluras kök, Zelmerlöw commented that he considered homosexuality an avvikelse (English: deviation). On the show, he said he did not think there was anything wrong with homosexuality, but that it is not natural biologically, since it does not lead to reproduction. He later apologised repeatedly for his remarks, claiming that they were a miscommunication. After his Melodifestivalen win a year later, the incident came under international media scrutiny, prompting a few members of gay, Swedish and Eurovision media to come to Zelmerlöw's defence. He later said that he would date a man "if [he] got that feeling".

Between 2008 and 2011, he was in a relationship with the Swedish singer and model Marie Serneholt, a member of the Swedish pop band A-Teens. In 2016, Zelmerlöw began dating British actress Ciara Janson and they later announced their engagement. In December 2017, Zelmerlöw announced that they were expecting a child together. On 25 May 2018 he announced via social media that Ciara had given birth to their son. The couple married on 5 September 2019. On 9 August 2022, Zelmerlöw announced on Instagram that Janson had given birth to their second son. As of 2024, Zelmerlöw and Janson live on a vineyard in Staffanstorp, with Janson travelling to England every other week for her son from a previous relationship.

On 8 July 2024, Zelmerlöw opened a coffee and wine trailer named Beans and Grapes which is in the garden adjacent to the tennis museum in Båstad, Sweden. The coffee and wine trailer is said to feature live music and have room for 50 guests.

In March 2025, Janson filed for divorce, accusing Zelmerlöw of toxic and abusive behaviour. This caused a sensation in Sweden where they are very well known. In May 2025, Sveriges Radio published an interview with Dagens Nyheter, who disclosed that it had turned down an interview with Zelmerlöw due to demands he made; among those were not to allow Janson to comment on what he said in it or do an interview on her own. Göteborgs-Posten instead made the interview.

== Discography ==
- Stand by For... (2007)
- MZW (2009)
- Christmas with Friends (2010)
- Kära vinter (2011)
- Barcelona Sessions (2014)
- Perfectly Damaged (2015)
- Chameleon (2016)
- Time (2019)

| New title | Let's Dance winner Season 1 (2006); With: Maria Karlsson | Succeeded by Martin Lidberg and Cecilia Erling |
| Preceded by (Slovenia) Saša Lendero | OGAE Second Chance Contest winner 2007 | Succeeded by (Sweden) Sanna Nielsen |
| Preceded by Sanna Nielsen | Melodifestivalen winner 2015 | Succeeded by Frans |
| Preceded by (Austria) Conchita Wurst | Eurovision Song Contest winner 2015 | Succeeded by (Ukraine) Jamala |
