= Dami Im discography =

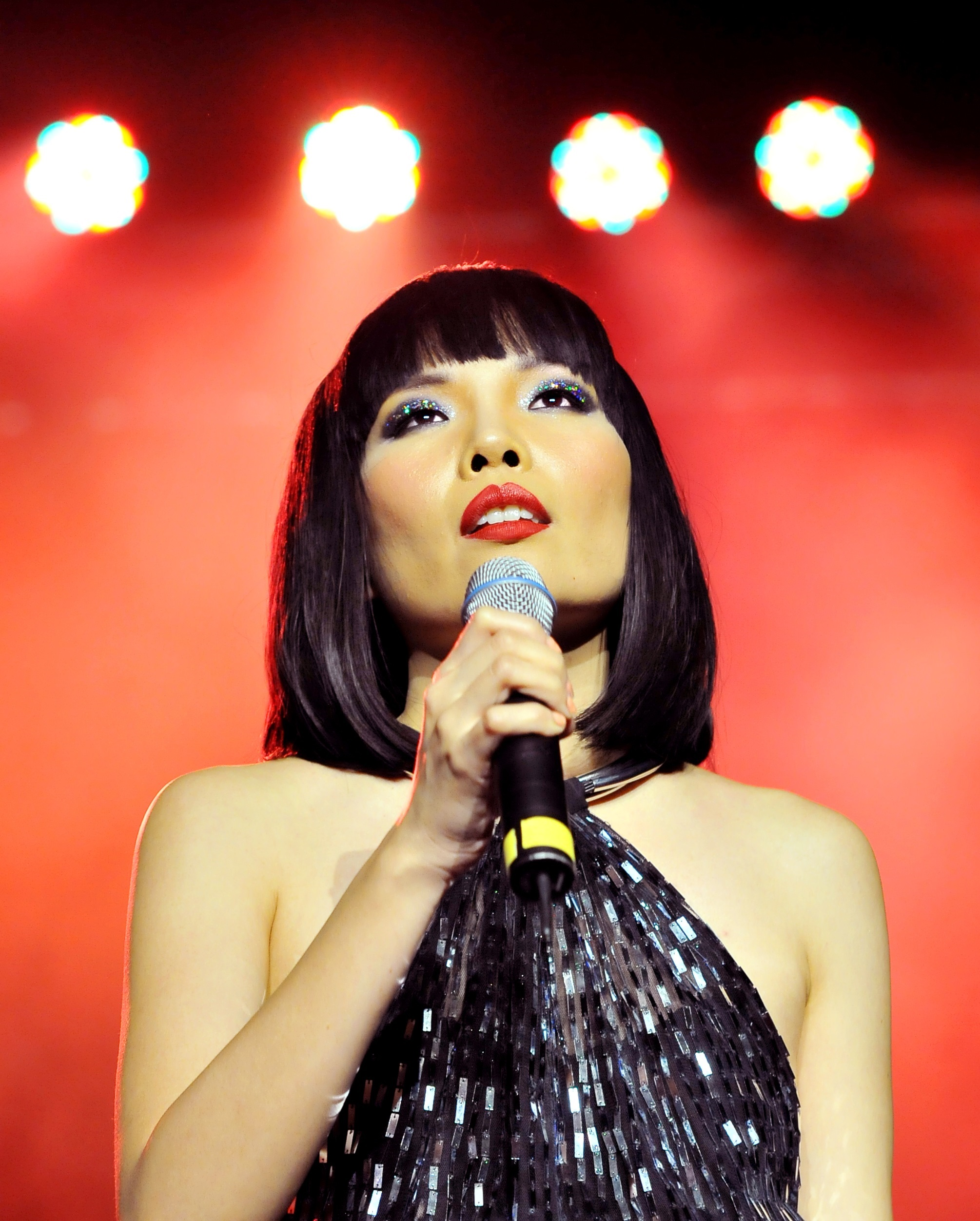
- Dami Im performing during The X Factor Live Tour in November 2013
- Studio albums: 6
- EPs: 7
- Singles: 32
- Music videos: 13
- Album appearances: 5

The discography of South Korean-born Australian recording artist Dami Im consists of six studio albums, seven extended plays, thirty-two singles (including five as featured artist) and two album appearances. Im began her music career as a gospel singer in Korea and independently released her debut studio album, Dream, in 2010. She was the winner on the fifth season of The X Factor Australia in 2013, and subsequently received a contract with Sony Music Australia. Im released her self-titled second studio album in November 2013, which features selected songs she performed as part of the top twelve on The X Factor. The album debuted at number one on the ARIA Albums Chart and was certified platinum by the Australian Recording Industry Association (ARIA), denoting shipments of 70,000 copies. Additionally, the album also included Im's debut single "Alive", which topped the ARIA Singles Chart and was certified platinum. She became the first X Factor Australia contestant to follow up a number one single with a number one album on the ARIA Charts.

In January 2014, Im collaborated with Jessica Mauboy, Justice Crew, Nathaniel Willemse, Samantha Jade and Taylor Henderson on a cover of "I Am Australian" to coincide with the Australia Day celebrations. Their cover peaked at number 51 on the ARIA Singles Chart. Im's third studio album Heart Beats was released in October 2014. The album was preceded by its first two singles "Super Love" and "Gladiator", both of which peaked at number 11 on the ARIA Singles Chart. Upon its release, Heart Beats debuted at number seven on the ARIA Albums Chart and became Im's second top-ten album.

In August 2020, Im confirmed she had signed with ABC Music and released a new album in 2021.

== Studio albums ==
List of studio albums, with selected chart positions and certifications
Title	Details	Peak chart positions		Certifications
Title	Details	AUS	KOR Int.	Certifications
Dream	Released: 2010; Formats: CD, digital download	—	—	
Dami Im	Released: 15 November 2013; Label: Sony Music Australia; Formats: CD, digital download, streaming	1	9	ARIA: Platinum
Heart Beats	Released: 14 October 2014; Label: Sony Music Australia; Formats: CD, digital download, streaming	7	32	
Classic Carpenters	Released: 22 April 2016; Label: Sony Music Australia; Formats: CD, digital download, streaming	3	23	ARIA: Gold
I Hear a Song	Released: 23 March 2018; Label: Sony Music Australia; Formats: CD, digital download, streaming	3	11	
My Reality	Released: 29 October 2021; Label: ABC Music; Formats: CD, digital download, streaming	12	—	
"—" denotes an album that did not chart or was not released in that territory.

== Extended plays ==
List of extended plays
Title	Details	Peak chart positions
Title	Details	AUS
Snow & Carol	Released: 5 December 2011 (Korea); Formats: CD, digital download	—
Intimacy	Released: 9 July 2012 (Korea); Formats: Digital download	—
Live Sessions EP	Released: 11 January 2019; Label: Sony; Formats: CD, digital download, streaming	— (Note: Live Sessions EP did not enter the ARIA Top 100 Albums Chart, but peaked at number 29 on the Australian Digital Albums.)
In Between	Released: 7 July 2023; Label: Dami Army, ABC; Formats: CD, digital download, streaming	65
Live Sessions: Bluesfest Byron Bay	Released: 15 September 2023; Label: Dami Army, ABC; Formats: Digital download	—
Christmas Songbook	Released: 17 November 2023; Label: Dami Army, ABC; Formats: CD, digital download	99
Stormy Weather	Released: 12 June 2026; Label: Dami Army; Formats: CD, digital download	36

== Singles ==
=== As lead artist ===
List of singles, with selected chart positions and certifications
Title	Year	Peak chart positions										Certifications	Album
Title	Year	AUS	AUT	FRA	GER	KOR Int.	NL	SPA	SWE	SWI	UK	Certifications	Album
"Alive"	2013	1	—	—	—	29	—	—	—	—	—	ARIA: Platinum	Dami Im
"I Am Australian" (with Jessica Mauboy, Justice Crew, Nathaniel Willemse, Samantha Jade and Taylor Henderson)	2014	51	—	—	—	—	—	—	—	—	—		Non-album singles
"Jolene (Acoustic)"	2014	—	—	—	—	—	—	—	—	—	—		Non-album singles
"Super Love"	2014	11	—	—	—	16	—	—	—	—	—	ARIA: Platinum	Heart Beats
"Gladiator"	2014	11	—	—	—	—	—	—	—	—	—	ARIA: Gold	Heart Beats
"Living Dangerously"	2014	—	—	—	—	—	—	—	—	—	—		Heart Beats
"Smile"	2015	48	—	—	—	63	—	—	—	—	—		Non-album singles
"Sound of Silence"	2016	5	39	69	57	—	100	37	17	55	160	ARIA: Platinum; GLF: Gold	Non-album singles
"Fighting for Love"	2016	64	—	—	—	—	—	—	—	—	—		Non-album singles
"Hold Me in Your Arms" (with Jack Jones)	2017	—	—	—	—	—	—	—	—	—	—		Non-album singles
"Crying Underwater"	2019	— (Note: "Crying Underwater" did not enter the ARIA Singles Chart, but peaked at number 28 on the ARIA Digital Track Chart.)	—	—	—	—	—	—	—	—	—		My Reality
"Kiss You Anyway"	2020	—	—	—	—	—	—	—	—	—	—		My Reality
"Walk with Me" (with Måns Zelmerlöw)	2020	—	—	—	—	—	—	—	—	—	—		Non-album single
"Marching On"	2020	—	—	—	—	—	—	—	—	—	—		My Reality
"Paper Dragon"	2020	—	—	—	—	—	—	—	—	—	—		My Reality
"Lonely Cactus"	2021	—	—	—	—	—	—	—	—	—	—		My Reality
"Pray"	2021	—	—	—	—	—	—	—	—	—	—		My Reality
"We're All Fruit Salad" (with The Wiggles)	2021	—	—	—	—	—	—	—	—	—	—		Non-album single
"Collide"	2023	—	—	—	—	—	—	—	—	—	—		In Between
"In Between" (featuring Jude York)	2023	—	—	—	—	—	—	—	—	—	—		In Between
"Santa Claus Is Coming to Town"	2023	—	—	—	—	—	—	—	—	—	—		Christmas Songbook
"A New Era"	2024	—	—	—	—	—	—	—	—	—	—		Black Box (theatre production)
"Silent Night"	2024	—	—	—	—	—	—	—	—	—	—		Non-album single
"My Favourite Scar"	2025	—	—	—	—	—	—	—	—	—	—		My Eyes (film)
"Bubble"	2025	—	—	—	—	—	—	—	—	—	—		Stormy Weather
"Dancing in the Dark" (with Kaiak)	2025	—	—	—	—	—	—	—	—	—	—		Non-album singles
"Oh Holy Night"	2025	—	—	—	—	—	—	—	—	—	—		Non-album singles
"Sight of You"	2026	—	—	—	—	—	—	—	—	—	—		Stormy Weather
"Sound of Silence" (re-recorded featuring Electric Fields)	2026	—	—	—	—	—	—	—	—	—	—		
"Blue Chalk (Fly)"	2026	—	—	—	—	—	—	—	—	—	—		Stormy Weather
"Proud of Me"	2026	—	—	—	—	—	—	—	—	—	—		Stormy Weather
"—" denotes a single that did not chart or was not released in that territory.

=== As featured artist ===
List of featured singles
Title	Year
"O God of Mine (오 나의 하나님은)" (Isaiah 6tyOne featuring Dami Im)	2013
"Promised Land" (Yirrmal featuring Dami Im)	2022

=== Promotional singles ===
List of promotional singles, with selected chart positions
Title	Year	Peak chart positions	Album
Title	Year	AUS	Album
"Heart Beats Again"	2014	92	Heart Beats

== Other charted songs ==
List of non-single songs, with selected chart positions
Title	Year	Peak chart positions		Album
Title	Year	AUS	KOR	Album
"One"	2013	42	—	Non-album singles
"Purple Rain"	2013	29	—	Non-album singles
"Don't Leave Me This Way"	2013	67	—	Non-album singles
"Roar"	2013	44	—	Non-album singles
"Best of You"	2013	78	—	Non-album singles
"Bridge over Troubled Water"	2013	15	—	Non-album singles
"Clarity"	2013	77	—	Non-album singles
"Wrecking Ball"	2013	61	—	Non-album singles
"Saving All My Love for You"	2013	85	—	Non-album singles
"And I Am Telling You I'm Not Going"	2013	29	—	Non-album singles
"Hero"	2013	62	—	Non-album singles
"Moment Just Like This"	2014	—	35	Heart Beats
"—" denotes a song that did not chart or was not released in that territory.

== Album appearances ==
List of album appearances
Title	Year	Album
"The Christmas Song"	2014	The Spirit of Christmas 2014
"Endless Love" (Stan Walker featuring Dami Im)	2015	Truth & Soul
"Will You Love Me Tomorrow"	2017	Beautiful: A Tribute to Carole King
"I Say a Little Prayer" (Human Nature featuring Dami Im)	2018	Romance of the Jukebox
"Big Red Car"	2022	ReWiggled

== Music videos ==
List of music videos
Title	Year	Director(s)	Ref.
"Alive"	2013	Dannii Minogue and Elisa Mercurio	
"Super Love"	2014	James Chappell	
"Gladiator"	2014	Young Black Youth	
"Smile"	2015	Lauren Bayliss	
"Sound of Silence"	2016	Tom Spark	
"Close to You"	2016	Lauren Bayliss	
"There's a Kind of Hush"	2016	Lauren Bayliss	
"Yesterday Once More"	2016	Lauren Bayliss	
"Fighting for Love"	2016		
"Crying Underwater"	2019	Anthony Rose	
"Marching On"	2020		
"Paper Dragon"	2020	Stefano Bertelli	
"Collide"	2023		
