= I Hear a Song =

I Hear a Song may refer to:

- I Hear a Song, a 2018 album by Dami Im
- I Hear a Song Tour, a 2018 tour by Dami Im.
- "I Hear a Song", a song by Jessi Colter from her 1975 album I'm Jessi Colter
- "I Hear a Song", a song from the 1976 musical Don't Step on My Olive Branch
