= List of stage names: Y =

This list of stage names lists names used by those in the entertainment industry, alphabetically by their stage name's surname (or the best approximation) followed by the given name (or the best approximation) where the surname begins with "Y". One-word stage names are presented in List of one-word stage names.

Stage name	Birth name	Life	Notability	Notes
Lil Yachty	Miles Parks McCollum	1997–	American rapper	
Sami Yaffa	Sami Lauri Takamäki	1963–	Finnish musician (Hanoi Rocks)	
Shirley Yamaguchi	Yoshiko Yamaguchi	1920–2014	Japanese singer, actress, journalist and politician	
Romina Yan	Romina Yankelevich	1974–2010	Argentine actress	
Mama Yancey	Estella Harris	1896–1986	American singer	
Daddy Yankee	Ramón Luis Ayala Rodríguez	1977–	Puerto Rican rapper and singer	
Arnold Yarrow	Arnold Stein	1920–2024	British actor, screenwriter and novelist	
Sebastián Yatra	Sebastián Obando Giraldo	1994–	Colombian singer	
DJ Yella	Antoine Carraby	1961–	American DJ and producer (N.W.A.)	
Han Ye-seul	Leslie Kim	1981–	South Korean actress	
Jude York	Jeremy Beamish	1999–	Australian singer-songwriter	
Michael York	Michael Hugh Johnson	1942–	English actor	
Susannah York	Susannah Yolande Fletcher	1939–2011	English actress	
Edith Yorke	Edith Murgatroyd	1867–1934	English actress	
Country Yossi	Yossi Toiv	1949–	American composer, singer, radio show host, author and magazine publisher	
Mister You	Younes Latifi	1984–	French rapper	
Yabby You	Vivian Neville Jackson	1946–2010	Jamaican musician	Sometimes credited as Yabby U
Burt Young	Gerald Tommaso DeLouise	1940–2023	American actor	
Gig Young	Byron Elsworth Barr	1913–1978	American actor	
Jesse Colin Young	Perry Miller	1941–2025	American musician (The Youngbloods)	
Jimmy Young	Leslie Ronald Young	1921–2016	English singer, disc jockey and radio personality	
Skip Young	Ronald Bix Plumstead	1930–1993	American actor	
Stephen Young	Stephen Levy	1939–	Canadian actor	
Big Youth	Manley Augustus Buchanan	1949–	Jamaican deejay	Sometimes credited as Jah Youth
Todd Youth	Todd Schofield	1971–2018	American musician	
