= Fighting for Love =

Fighting for Love may refer to:

- Fighting for Love (1917 film), American film
- Fighting for Love (2001 film), Hong Kong film
- Fighting for Love (song), Dami Im song
