= Stormy Weather =

Stormy Weather may refer to:

== Films ==
- Stormy Weather (1935 film), a British comedy film directed by Tom Walls
- Stormy Weather (1943 film), an American musical motion picture produced and released by 20th Century Fox in 1943
- Stormy Weathers (film), a 1992 film directed by Will Mackenzie
- Stormy Weather (2003 French-Icelandic film), a French-Icelandic film
- Stormy Weather (2003 Spanish film), a Spanish film

== Television ==
- "Stormy Weather," an episode of Blue's Clues
- "Stormy Weather," an episode of Courage the Cowardly Dog
- "Stormy Weather," an episode of SpongeBob SquarePants
- "Stormy Weather," an episode of Miraculous: Tales of Ladybug & Cat Noir
- "Stormy Weather," an episode of Star Trek: Discovery

== Music ==
=== Albums ===
- Stormy Weather (Lena Horne album), 1957
- Stormy Weather (Thelonious Monster album), 1990
- Stormy Weather (Grace Knight album), 1991
- Stormy Weather (AT&T album), a 1998 live compilation album by various artists

=== Extended plays ===
- Stormy Weather (EP), a 2026 EP by Dami Im

=== Songs ===
- "Stormy Weather" (song), a 1933 song written by Harold Arlen and Ted Koehler and first sung by Ethel Waters at The Cotton Club in Harlem
- "Stormy Weather", a song by the Pixies from their 1990 album Bossanova
- "Stormy Weather" (Echo & the Bunnymen song), their 2005 single
- "Stormy Weather" (Stella Parton song), a song by Stella Parton that was a top-40 US-Canadian country single in 1979
- "Stormy Weather", a song by Grime MC Wiley, from his 2006 mixtape "Da 2nd Phaze"
- "Stormy Weather", a song by Kings of Leon from their 2021 album When You See Yourself
- "Stormy Weather", a song by The Kooks from their 2008 album Konk
- "Stormy Weather", a song by Nina Nastasia from her 2000 album Dogs

== Other uses ==
- Stormy Weather (yacht), the 1934 yacht that won both the 1935 Fastnet race and Trans-Atlantic races
- Stormy Weather (novel), a 1995 novel by Carl Hiaasen
- Stormy Weather: The Life of Lena Horne, a 2009 biography of Lena Horne by James Gavin
- A cocktail made with rum, ginger beer and lime juice
