= Truth & Soul =

Studio album by Stan Walker
- Released: 17 April 2015
- Genres: Soul; R&B; pop
- Length: 49:21
- Label: Sony

Stan Walker chronology
Inventing Myself (2013)	Truth & Soul (2015)	Stan (2018)

Truth & Soul is the fifth studio album by Australian-New Zealand recording artist Stan Walker. It was released in Australia and New Zealand on 17 April 2015 by Sony Music Australia and features a collection of soul covers.

== Background ==
Whilst working as a judge on The X Factor New Zealand and on a new album of original material, Walker decided to "buy some time" and release an album of soul covers. The idea of recording an album of covers was suggested to Walker by the head of Sony Australia, Denis Handlin, and Walker initially rejected the idea, having previously stated on the subject: "Hell no! I'm an artist! I write my stuff!" However, he began going through his Facebook and saw the videos he had put up of the covers that inspired him. He later was adamant that he interpret the songs his own way. The album was announced in March. Walker said, "These are songs I've loved forever and songs I've fallen in love with all over again. They've always been with me and I wanted to make them my own."

"To be honest, this record is a little bit of self-indulgence because they are my favourite songs. And I would have been scared to sing any of them out of the shower three years ago, especially 'Let's Get it On', because of who I was and what I represented as a young man," Walker said. "I have a standard to uphold — my whole thing as an artist has been that I don't sell sex. Now I feel I have become more honest about who I am and I actually don't care what people think. I want to sing and talk about sex and love and dreams and death and these songs let me do it. I want to feel good, like anyone."

== Promotion ==
Walker performed "Signed, Sealed, Delivered I'm Yours" and "A Change Is Gonna Come" for Radio New Zealand on April 16. He later sung "I Got a Woman" and "Endless Love" with Dami Im on April 17 on Sunrise.

Walker performed a medley of songs from the album live on The X Factor New Zealand on April 20. He later performed "Is This Love" on the Today on May 8.

== Critical reception ==
Victoria Venardos of Renowned for Sound said: "Stan's vocal ability is impressively on display throughout this record, you can hear a deep respect for each song with effortless falsetto and unveiled emotion."

Andja Curcic also of Renowned for Sound gave the album 3.5 stars out of 5 in his review of the album, saying: "Overall, Truth & Soul showcases a playful approach to musical covers and that is something Walker should be commended for. However, there is also a danger when transforming iconic hits – their beauty can be lost. Walker's vocals shine in this album and it is nice to see him steer away from the pop scene and reconnect with his roots. This album is a solid effort."

Siena Yates of Stuff.co.nz said; "It's a good listen, and Walker's vocals are impressive as ever, but there's not a lot of improving on classics like these." Yates complimented "A Change Is Gonna Come", calling it the standout "on which Walker is soulful, thoughtful and appropriately restrained, letting Sam Cooke's classic resonate on its own, without letting it override his vocal."

== Track listing ==
No.	Title	Writer(s)	Length
1.	"Ain't Too Proud to Beg"	Norman Whitfield; Edward Holland, Jr.	2:41
2.	"Signed, Sealed, Delivered"	Stevie Wonder; Lee Garrett; Syreeta Wright; Lula Mae Hardaway	3:23
3.	"I'll Be There" (featuring Samantha Jade)	Berry Gordy; Bob West; Willie Hutch; Hal Davis	4:07
4.	"Try a Little Tenderness"	Jimmy Campbell and Reg Connelly; Harry M. Woods	4:16
5.	"Let's Get It On"	Marvin Gaye; Ed Townsend	5:02
6.	"This Woman's Work"	Kate Bush	4:01
7.	"These Arms of Mine"	Otis Redding	2:55
8.	"Endless Love" (featuring Dami Im)	Lionel Richie	4:16
9.	"Is This Love"	Bob Marley	4:20
10.	"End of the Road" (featuring Vince Harder, Barry Conrad and Fourtunate)	Kenneth "Babyface" Edmonds; Antonio "L.A." Reid; Daryl Simmons	3:55
11.	"I Got a Woman"	Ray Charles; Renald Richard	3:20
12.	"I Got You (I Feel Good)"	James Brown	2:30
13.	"A Change Is Gonna Come"	Sam Cooke	4:35
Total length:			49:21

== Charts ==
The album becomes Walker's third top 10 album in Australia after his debut Introducing Stan Walker in 2009 and From the Inside Out in 2010.

=== Weekly charts ===
Chart (2015)	Peak position
Australian Albums (ARIA)	7
New Zealand Albums (RMNZ)	3

=== Year-end charts ===
Chart (2015)	Position
New Zealand Albums (RMNZ)	41

== Release history ==
Region	Date	Format	Label	Catalogue
Australia	17 April 2015	CD, digital download	Sony Music Australia	978222846
New Zealand	17 April 2015	CD, digital download	Sony Music Australia	
