= In Between (Dami Im EP) =

EP by Dami Im
- Released: 7 July 2023
- Label: ABC Music
- Producer: Jason Bovino, Andy Mak, Jude York

Dami Im chronology
My Reality (2021)	In Between (2023)

In Between is the fourth extended play by Australian singer Dami Im, released on 7 July 2023 by ABC Music.

Upon announcement, Im said "In Between is a collection of songs I made amidst the rocky shift into motherhood. The seven tracks chronologically document the seven stages of emotional states, exploring themes of identity, societal expectations, love, and friendship, before ultimately realizing that life exists within the liminal space of In Between".

Im further explained to Yahoo lifestyle "This new EP, it's similar but it's different to my other stuff. It's got a certain sound, it’s a bit more moody, there’s a bit more R&B elements to it."

The EP will be supported by a limited In Between Tour along Australia's east coast.

== Track listing ==
No.	Title	Writer(s)	Length
1.	"Role Model"	Dami Im; Jason Bovino	3:51
2.	"Optical Illusion"	Im; Bovino	3:24
3.	"Collide"	Im; Tom Eggert	3:03
4.	"Superhero"	Im; Bovino	3:55
5.	"A-Team"	Im; Bovino	3:46
6.	"Invincible"	Im; Bovino; Amy Sheppard; George Sheppard	3:17
7.	"In Between" (featuring Jude York)	Im; Jude York	2:50

== Charts ==
Chart (2023)	Peak position
Australian Albums (ARIA)	65

== Release history ==
Country	Date	Format	Label	Catalogue
Various	7 July 2023	Digital download; streaming	ABC Music	—N/a
Australia	7 July 2023	Compact Disc	ABC Music	ABCM0019
