= Lonely Cactus =

Song by Dami Im

Single by Dami Im

from the album My Reality
- Released: 19 February 2021
- Length: 3:11
- Label: Dami Army, ABC
- Songwriters: Dami Im; Andrew Burford; Bri Clarke
- Producer: One Above

Dami Im singles chronology
"Paper Dragon" (2020)	"Lonely Cactus" (2021)

Music video
- "Lonely Cactus" on YouTube

"Lonely Cactus" is a song by Australian singer Dami Im and released on 19 February 2021 as the fifth single from Im's sixth studio album, My Reality (2021). The song did not enter the ARIA top 100, but debuted at number 5 on the Australian Independent chart.

Im wrote the song in 2020, during the height of the COVID-19 pandemic in Australia admitting "There were days when I felt lonely. I needed to make friends or see my friends. Other days I just wanted to be alone." In an interview with Hope Breakfast, Im said "Initially I wrote it as I'm a lonely cactus. I was in lockdown with [husband] Noah, and I wanted to socialise again and find connection, but when things opened up and I was going to catch up with friends, I couldn't be bothered. I wanted to be by myself. I love being by myself, and I had gotten so used to that and eventually we changed the lyrics to 'you’re a lonely cactus' because it was just easier to write about someone else."

A piano version was released on 30 April 2021.

== Music video ==
The music video premiered on 19 February 2021.

== Track listings ==
- Digital download
1. "Lonely Cactus" – 3:11
- Digital download
1. "Lonely Cactus" (Piano version) – 3:27

== Charts ==
Chart performance for "Lonely Cactus"
Chart (2021)	Peak position
Australia Independent (AIR)	5
