= I Hear a Song Tour =

2018 concert tour by Dami Im

- Tour by Dami Im
- Location: Australia
- Associated album: I Hear a Song
- Start date: April 19, 2018
- End date: November 23, 2018
- Legs: 2
- No. of shows: 12

Dami Im concert chronology
- Yesterday Once More Tour (2016-17); I Hear a Song Tour (2018); Dreamer Tour (2019)

The I Hear a Song Tour is the second nationwide concert tour by Australian pop star, Dami Im. The album will support Im's fifth studio album I Hear a Song, released on 23 March 2018.

== Announcement and description ==
The Tour was announced on 7 December 2017.

The tour is described as an "intimate tour" with Dami playing her hits and fan favourites as well as new material from her upcoming album.

In August, 3 additional dates were added for November 2018.

== Reception ==
Jesse Caffey of scenestr said "Not only is she exceptionally talented with a hugely impressive vocal range, but she could easily go into comedy. Her dry sense of humour was genuinely hilarious and made for charming interludes between songs, as she explained the reasons why each track was included on the album and gave us a history lesson about her beginnings as a classically trained pianist."

== Set list ==
Set list from 19 April in Melbourne.

1. "Feeling Good"
2. "Summertime"
3. "Love On Top"
4. "Roar"
5. "Rock with You"
6. "One"
7. "Come Away with Me"
8. "You Don't Have to Say You Love Me"
9. "Round Midnight"
10. "I Hear a Song"

Interval

11. "Super Love"
12. "Sound of Silence"
13. "My Funny Valentine"
14. "Autumn Leaves"
15. "I Can't Make You Love Me"
16. "God Bless the Child"
17. "Like a Cello"

Encore

18. "I Say a Little Prayer"

== Tour dates ==
Date	City	Country	Venue
First Leg
19 April 2018	Melbourne	Australia	Chapel Off Chapel
20 April 2018	Melbourne	Australia	Chapel Off Chapel
21 April 2018	Melbourne	Australia	Chapel Off Chapel
4 May 2018	Brisbane	Australia	Brisbane Powerhouse
5 May 2018	Brisbane	Australia	Brisbane Powerhouse
9 May 2018	Sydney	Australia	The Leadbelly
10 May 2018	Sydney	Australia	The Leadbelly
11 May 2018	Sydney	Australia	The Leadbelly
12 May 2018	Sydney	Australia	The Leadbelly
Second Leg
3 November 2018	Gladstone	Australia	Gladstone Entertainment Centre
22 November 2018	Coffs Harbour	Australia	C.ex
23 November 2018	New Lambton	Australia	Wests
