= Live Sessions EP (Dami Im EP) =

EP by Dami Im
- Released: 11 January 2019
- Label: Sony Music Australia

Dami Im chronology
I Hear a Song (2018)	Live Sessions EP (2019)	My Reality (2021)

Live Sessions EP is the third extended play by Australian singer Dami Im, released on 11 January 2019 by Sony Music Australia. Upon announcement, Im said "I love performing my songs live. It's the only time I can connect with each person on such an intimate level as I share the deepest parts of me." Pre-orders of the EP came with the instant-grat track "Dreamer".

The EP will be supported by the "Dreamer Tour" commencing in August 2019.

The EP includes an original track titled, "Dreamer" co-written by Im. The song is about her frustrations with the Sony Label, unknown to them at the time.

== Track listing ==
No.	Title	Writer(s)	Length
1.	"Dreamer"	Dami Im; Carl Dimataga	4:14
2.	"I Hear a Song"	Rick Price; Im	2:44
3.	"Like a Cello"	Im	3:07
4.	"Super Love"	Hayley Aitken; Johan Gustafson; Fredrik Häggstam; Sebastian Lundberg	3:38
5.	"Sound of Silence"	Anthony Egizii; David Musumeci	4:17
6.	"Amazing Grace"		3:59

== Charts ==
Chart (2019)	Peak position
Australian Digital Albums (ARIA)	29

== Release history ==
Country	Date	Format	Label	Catalogue
Australia	11 January 2019	Digital download; streaming	Sony Music Australia	
Australia	19 April 2019	Compact Disc	Sony Music Australia	19075936852
