= Kiss You Anyway =

Single by Dami Im

from the album My Reality
- Released: 3 January 2020
- Length: 3:35
- Label: Dami Army
- Songwriter: Dami Im
- Producer: Andy Mak

Dami Im singles chronology
"Crying Underwater" (2019)	"Kiss You Anyway" (2020)	"Walk with Me" (2020)

"Kiss You Anyway" is a song by Australian singer Dami Im. The song was released on 3 January 2020 as the second single from her sixth studio album, My Reality (2021). Im said on social media, "'Kiss You Anyway' is a song where I used the most imagery in the lyrics and it is so special to me."

The song did not enter the ARIA top 100, but debuted at number 12 on the Australian Independent chart.

On 6 November 2020, a Korean language version was released.

== Reception ==
Nick van Lith from ESCXtra said "The power is still there, but in a completely different way. Instead of big vocals and impressive high notes, it's now the mystery and instrumentation that does the trick for the 31-year old singer. Her latest single is called 'Kiss You Anyway' and is exactly what the new Dami Im wants to show us. It's a modern and exciting effort, which still showcases her powerful voice, but doesn't draw attention away from the lyrics."

Kyriakos Tsinivits from AussieVission said "The song is a very emotional piece about loving someone no matter what."

== Track listings ==
- Digital download
1. "Kiss You Anyway" – 3:35
- Digital download
1. "Kiss You Anyway" (Korean version) – 3:36

== Charts ==
Chart (2020)	Peak position
Australia Independent (AIR)	12
