= Paper Dragon =

Single by Dami Im

from the album My Reality
- Released: 18 September 2020
- Length: 3:04
- Label: Dami Army, ABC
- Songwriters: Dami Im; Elanor Witt
- Producer: Konstantin Kersting

Dami Im singles chronology
"Marching On" (2020)	"Paper Dragon" (2020)	"Lonely Cactus" (2021)

Music video
- "Paper Dragon" on YouTube

"Paper Dragon" is a song by Australian singer Dami Im. The song was announced on 31 August 2020 and released on 18 September 2020. The song is the first by Im on the ABC Label, following a successful run with Sony and a number of self-released singles throughout 2019 and 2020. It was written by Im and Eleanor Witt, and produced by Konstantin Kersting.

The track was originally intended to be Im's entry for Eurovision – Australia Decides, in an attempt to represent Australia at Eurovision 2021, but with the cancellation of the 2020 event due to the COVID-19 pandemic and Montaigne's internal selection for the 2021 event, Im "decided to release the song anyway".

The song did not enter the ARIA top 100, but debuted at number 1 on the Australian Independent chart.

A piano version was released on 9 October 2020.

In an album review of My Reality in November 2021, David from auspOp called "Paper Dragon" the album highlight.

== Music video ==
Im worked with an Italian stop-motion animator, who created the whole video using paper cutouts. The music video was directed by Stefano Bertelli at Seen Film Studio and premiered on 17 September 2020.

== Track listings ==
- Digital download
1. "Paper Dragon" – 3:04
- Digital download
1. "Paper Dragon" (Piano version) – 2:50

== Charts ==
Chart (2020)	Peak position
Australia Independent (AIR)	1
