= Crying Underwater =

Single by Dami Im

from the album My Reality
- Released: 13 September 2019
- Length: 3:38
- Label: Dami Im
- Songwriter(s): Dami Im; Michael Tan
- Producer(s): Andy Mak

Dami Im singles chronology
"Hold Me In Your Arms" (2017)	"Crying Underwater" (2019)	"Kiss You Anyway" (2020)

Music video
- "Crying Underwater" on YouTube

"Crying Underwater" is a song by Australian singer Dami Im, released on 13 September 2019. The song marks the beginning of a new chapter in Im's career, as it was released independently. Im said of the release; "There is so much pressure in today's society to always look happy so we end up feeling like we're not allowed to talk about how we really feel, Just like you're crying underwater where no one can see you crying." Speaking to The Courier-Mail, Im said "It's a song I wrote about somebody I knew who seemed really happy and he took his own life."

In her autobiography Dreamer Im further explains, "We [Michael Tan and I] went into the studio for our session, we spoke about a friend and fellow musician who had recently died by suicide... our friend had seemed really happy, but he must have been struggling underneath. In my conversation with Michael, we spoke about how hard it is for men to talk about their emotions and their challenges and that's how 'Crying Underwater' came to life.

Im performed the song live on Sunrise on 13 September and on Studio 10 on 19 September 2019.

== Track listings ==
- Digital download
1. "Crying Underwater" – 3:39
- Digital download
1. "Crying Underwater" (Taekn remix) – 3:26

== Charts ==
Chart (2019)	Peak position
Australia Digital Tracks (ARIA)	28
Australia Independent (AIR)	3

== Release history ==
Country	Date	Format	Label
Australia	13 September 2019	Digital download, streaming	Dami Im
