= Alive (Dami Im song) =

Single by Dami Im

from the album Dami Im
- Released: 28 October 2013
- Recorded: 2013
- Genre: Pop
- Length: 3:56
- Label: Sony
- Songwriters: Anthony Egizii; David Musumeci
- Producer: DNA

Dami Im singles chronology
"Alive" (2013)	"I Am Australian" (2014)

"Alive" is the winner's single by season five winner of The X Factor Australia, Dami Im. It was released digitally on 28 October 2013, as the lead single from her self-titled second album. "Alive" was written and produced by DNA Songs. Four days after its release in Australia, the song debuted at number one on the ARIA Singles Chart. It was certified Platinum by the Australian Recording Industry Association for selling over 70,000 copies.

== Background and release ==
"Alive" was written by Anthony Egizii and David Musumeci. It was also produced by Egizii and Musumeci under their production name DNA. After winning The X Factor, "Alive" was released for digital download in Australia on 28 October 2013, as Im's winner's single. On 1 November 2013, "Alive" was released for digital download in South Korea on various music sites.

== Chart performance ==
Four days after its release in Australia, "Alive" debuted at number one on the ARIA Singles Chart with first-week sales of 44,025 copies. One day after its release in South Korea, "Alive" debuted at number 51 on the South Korea Gaon International Digital Chart, for the week spanning from 27 October 2013 to 2 November 2013. The following week, 3 November 2013 to 9 November 2013, "Alive" rose to number 29.

== Live performances ==
Im performed "Alive" live for the first time during The X Factor grand final performance show on 27 October 2013. Im performed the song again during the grand final decider show the following day, after she was announced as the winner.

== Track listing ==
- CD / digital download
1. "Alive" – 3:56

== Personnel ==
- Vocals – Dami Im
- Songwriting – Anthony Egizii, David Musumeci
- Production – DNA
- Mixing engineer – Anthony Egizii
- Guitar – David Musumeci
- Background vocals – Sarah De Bono

== Charts ==
=== Weekly charts ===
Chart (2013)	Peak position
Australia (ARIA)	1
Singapore Top 30 (Music Weekly)	16
South Korea (Gaon International)	29

=== Year-end charts ===
Chart (2013)	Position
Australian Artist Singles (ARIA)	14

== Certifications ==
Region	Certification	Certified units/sales
Australia (ARIA)	Platinum	70,000^{^}
^{^} Shipments figures based on certification alone.

== Release history ==
Country	Date	Format	Label
Australia	28 October 2013	Digital download	Sony Music Australia
United States	28 October 2013	Digital download	Sony Music Australia
South Korea	1 November 2013	Digital download	Sony Music Korea
Australia	8 November 2013	CD	Sony Music Australia
