= Classic Carpenters =

Studio album by Dami Im
- Released: 22 April 2016
- Studios: Michael Tan's studio in Potts Point, Sydney
- Genres: Pop; jazz; easy listening
- Length: 37:43
- Label: Sony
- Producers: Bry Jones, Michael Tan

Dami Im chronology
Heart Beats (2014)	Classic Carpenters (2016)	I Hear a Song (2018)

Classic Carpenters is the fourth studio album by Australian recording artist Dami Im, released on 22 April 2016 by Sony Music Australia. The album consists of cover versions of American vocal duo the Carpenters' songs. The album was certified Gold is Australia (more than 35,000 units) in April 2017.

Im said: "My intention wasn't to copy Karen's voice or her tone, our voices naturally sound so different. I tried to bring out the joy and the innocence in the songs while trying to sing them as honest and raw as I could as Dami, rather than pretending to be someone else." Adding, "With this album and through my live performances, I hope to be remembered as the girl who is a real musician at heart who speaks truthfully through her craft."

== Background and recording ==
It was Sony that decided that Im needed to record an album of Carpenter covers and Im said the process of making this album was filled with "frustrating hurdles".

Im recorded tracks over several weeks at Michael Tan's studio in Potts Point, Sydney. Im did not want to replicate the songs, she wanted to reinterpret the songs and bring something "new and different" to them. Im said she "poured her heart into the project" and "enjoyed the process of reinterpreting some of the beautifully writing songs that were loved by millions of people around the world".

Once completed, the tracks were sent to Ross Fraser A&R at Sony Music who asked Im to re-recorded approximately 90% of them, stating that Sony didn't like them and that "they were not good enough". Disheartened, Im, Jones and Tan re-recorded the album the way Sony wanted.

== Promotional videos ==
Im released a video for "(They Long to Be) Close to You" on 15 April, a video for "There's a Kind of Hush" on 17 April, and a video for "Yesterday Once More" on 19 April.

== Critical reception ==
Cameron Adams from the Herald Sun gave the album 3 out of 5 saying; "There are two ways to tackle an album of covers of Carpenters' songs. You reinvent them or you recreate them. Here's Dami Im keeping it faithful for Mother's Day with lush, lovely remakes of "Yesterday Once More", "Close To You", "Rainy Days and Mondays" and so on". In a word, Adams described the album as "nice".

== Track listing ==
1. "(They Long to Be) Close to You" – 3:41
2. "There's a Kind of Hush" – 3:01
3. "Yesterday Once More" – 4:00
4. "Superstar" – 3:10
5. "Rainy Days and Mondays" – 3:27
6. "This Masquerade" – 3:58
7. "A Song for You" – 3:34
8. "I Won't Last a Day Without You" – 3:11
9. "I Need to Be in Love" – 3:53
10. "Hurting Each Other" – 2:46
11. "We've Only Just Begun" – 3:02

== Charts ==
=== Weekly charts ===
Chart (2016)	Peak position
Australian Albums (ARIA)	3
South Korean International Albums (Gaon)	23

=== Year-end charts ===
Chart (2016)	Position
Australian Albums (ARIA)	35

== Certifications ==
Region	Certification	Certified units/sales
Australia (ARIA)	Gold	35,000^{^}
^{^} Shipments figures based on certification alone.

== Release history ==
Region	Date	Format	Edition(s)	Label	Catalogue	Ref.
Australia	22 April 2016	CD; digital download	Standard	Sony Music Australia	88875150102	
South Korea	10 May 2016	Digital download	Standard	Sony Music Entertainment		
