= Smile (Dami Im song) =

Single by Dami Im
- Released: 26 May 2015
- Recorded: Solna, Sweden
- Genre: Bubblegum pop; doo-wop
- Length: 3:03
- Label: Sony
- Songwriters: Dami Im; Olof Lindskog; Hayley Aitken
- Producer: Ollipop

Dami Im singles chronology
"Living Dangerously" (2014)	"Smile" (2015)	"Sound of Silence" (2016)

"Smile" is a single by Australian recording artist Dami Im, released on 26 May 2015. It was written in Solna, Sweden by Im, Hayley Aitken and Olof Lindskog, and produced by the latter under his production name Ollipop. "Smile" is an upbeat bubblegum pop and doo-wop song that consists of a saxophone rift, electric guitar, synth, handclaps, harmonies and backing vocals. Several critics felt its production was reminiscent of Meghan Trainor's sound. Lyrically, "Smile" conveys a positive message "about loving and appreciating yourself and doing all the simple things in your life to make yourself smile and be ultimately happy." The song received mixed reviews from critics; some complimented its fun pop sound, while others criticised the simple production and Im for following Trainor's sound.

Upon its release, "Smile" debuted at number 48 on the Australian ARIA Singles Chart, number 55 on the South Korea Gaon International Download Chart and number 63 on the South Korea Gaon International Digital Chart. The accompanying music video features Im performing random acts of kindness as she gives out flowers, balloons, free coffee and drinks to people in the streets of Sydney, and visits a nursing home and childcare centre. Fans noted that the video's concept was similar to country duo O'Shea's video for their song "Bad Day Good" (2014). Im promoted "Smile" with interviews and performances on radio and television programs, as well as instore appearances.

"Smile" featured in a Pepsi commercial in China and Taiwan, causing the song to peak at number 32 in China in 2024.

== Production and release ==
"Smile" was written and recorded in Solna, Sweden. Dami Im co-wrote the song with Hayley Aitken and Olof Lindskog of the songwriter collective, The Kennel. It was produced and mixed by Lindskog under his production name Ollipop. The mastering was done by Leon Zervos at Studios 301 in Sydney. On 23 April 2015, Im announced on her social media platforms that "Smile" would be released as her next single. It was then made available to pre-order the following day. The song was first released digitally in South Korea on 26 May 2015. It was released both digitally and physically in Australia on 29 May 2015. The physical release features a Holiday remix of "Smile", which was produced and mixed by Carl Dimataga. He also provided all instruments and Audrey Dimataga provided additional backing vocals. The remix was later released digitally on 26 June 2015.

== Composition ==
Several critics felt "Smile" was reminiscent of Meghan Trainor's sound. "Smile" is an upbeat bubblegum pop and doo-wop song. Its instrumentation consists of a saxophone rift, electric guitar, synth, handclaps, harmonies and backing vocals. Jessica Morris of Fdrmx.com noted that "Smile" also features "soulful and restrained" vocals by Im and "a big band sound that mixes with contemporary electronic sounds". Damian of Auspop and Josep Vinaixa of Ultimate Music felt that the track was reminiscent of Meghan Trainor's sound. Similarly, Thomasbleach.com wrote that "Smile" was "channeling the 50s pop sound Meghan Trainor has made popular in mainstream culture", while Andja Curcic of Renowned for Sound added that Im took "on the throwback doo-wop 1950s style that has made Meghan Trainor such a worldwide success". Kathy McCabe of News.com.au felt that the song had a "retro 60s girl group sound" that would "connect with fans of Meghan Trainor's hits".

Im described "Smile" as a "feel good, joyful and uplifting song". The lyrics are "about loving and appreciating yourself and doing all the simple things in your life to make yourself smile and be ultimately happy." Curcic noted that "the song begins with a brass call and response interplay with an electric guitar". In the chorus, Im sings: "You gotta live your life, you gotta treat you right, you gotta give into that crazy appetite. You gotta shake it up, you gotta hold it down, you gotta do all the things that make you smile."

== Reception ==
Jessica Morris of Fdrmx.com gave the song 4.2 stars out of five and wrote that Im "delivers a high-energy performance that will put a smile on your face and give you that extra 'oomph' in the day. While it's not hugely climatic, 'Smile' is a fun diddy that puts other bubble-gum pop to shame with Im's superb talent." Thomasbleach.com called it an "infectious pop track" that "shows a fun and carefree side" to Im, further adding that "you can't help but bop along and smile". The website also felt that the song is "a bit too 'kid friendly' that it almost sounds like it belongs on a Wiggles album". Auspop gave "Smile" a mixed review, stating that the track "leaves us cold...for some reason it feels to us like her label's decided, 'hey, Meghan Trainor's sound's working right now, let's get ourselves a slice of that'."

Another mixed review came from Andja Curcic of Renowned for Sound, who gave "Smile" two-and-a-half stars out of five. She called it a "disappointing" and "silly song" with "uninspired and simplistic" lyrics, further adding that it "barely showcases" Im's big vocal range and does not have a "memorable quality" or "bring a fresh twist" to the throwback genre. Curcic concluded, "I really hope Im backs away from this genre and starts to build her way back to some great music." For the week ending 6 June 2015, "Smile" debuted at number 55 on the South Korea Gaon International Download Chart with sales of 3,896 copies, and number 63 on the South Korea Gaon International Digital Chart. In Australia, "Smile" debuted at number 48 on the ARIA Singles Chart for the week dated 8 June 2015, and only spent one week on that chart. It became Im's ninth top fifty and seventeenth top one hundred entry.

== Music video ==
The music video was filmed on 20 May 2015 and premiered on Im's Vevo channel on 28 May 2015. It features Im performing random acts of kindness around Sydney. The video begins with the caption: "On May 20, Dami took to the streets to make people smile for her new video. This is what happened." It then shows the question "What Makes You Smile?", followed by scenes of Im in the kitchen making muffins. She then visits a nursing home and gives out muffins to the residents before she sings and dances with them. This is followed by scenes of Im in the streets handing out free coffee and drinks to parents and their children. Im is then seen handing out flowers to people and taking photos with them. Afterwards, she visits a childcare centre and reads a story to the children and then dances with them. The video then shows Im volunteering to walk dogs in the park. She later visits a party shop where she blows up smiley face balloons and gives them out to people in the streets. The video then ends with a shot of a smiley face balloon.

Following the video's release, some fans noted that its concept was similar to the video for country duo O'Shea's song "Bad Day Good" (2014). O'Shea's video also features random acts of kindness as the duo are seen walking around a town paying for people's petrol and parking. When asked by The Daily Telegraph's Sydney Confidential about the similarities between the two videos, Im stated: "I had no idea something similar had been done. I just wanted to do something a bit different, and something that I wasn't in a costume or playing a character. I just wanted to be myself." Within four days of its release, the video for "Smile" had already received more than 16,000 views.

== Promotion ==
To celebrate the release of "Smile", Im launched a #MakeYouSmile social campaign to bring happiness to people through small gestures of kindness. She encouraged her fans and the wider public to do the same. The single's release and music video were promoted on Sunrise on 29 May 2015. Im also promoted "Smile" with a television interview on The Daily Edition (29 May 2015) and radio interviews on Fifi & Dave and 3AW (15 June 2015). She performed and signed physical copies of "Smile" for fans during instore appearances at Westfield Chatswood (30 May 2015) and Westfield Burwood (20 June 2015), and performed an acoustic version on the breakfast radio show Matt & Jane (12 June 2015). Im performed "Smile" with the Sydney Street Choir at the Sydney Opera House on 22 July 2015.

== Track listing ==
- Digital download
1. "Smile" – 3:03
- Digital download
1. "Smile" (Holiday Mix) – 3:27
- CD single
1. "Smile" – 3:03
2. "Smile" (Holiday Mix) – 3:27

== Credits and personnel ==
Credits adapted from the CD single liner notes.

Locations

- Mastered at Studios 301 in Sydney.

Personnel

- Songwriting – Dami Im, Olof Lindskog and Hayley Aitken
- Production – Ollipop
- Mixing – Ollipop
- Mastering – Leon Zervos

== Charts ==
Chart (2015)	Peak position
Australia (ARIA)	48
South Korea (Gaon International Digital)	63
South Korea (Gaon International Download)	55

== Release history ==
Country	Date	Format	Version(s)	Label
South Korea	26 May 2015	Digital download	Main version	Sony Music Entertainment
Australia	29 May 2015	CD single	Main version; Holiday Mix	Sony Music Australia
Australia	29 May 2015	Digital download	Main version	Sony Music Australia
Australia	26 June 2015	Digital download	Holiday Mix	Sony Music Australia
