= Marching On (Dami Im song) =

Single by Dami Im

from the album My Reality
- Released: 7 February 2020
- Length: 3:00
- Label: Dami Army
- Songwriter(s): Dami Im
- Producer(s): Andy Mak

Dami Im singles chronology
| "Walk with Me" (2020) | "Marching On" (2020) | "Paper Dragon" (2020) |

Music video
- "Marching On" on YouTube

"Marching On" is a song by Australian singer Dami Im. The song was released on 7 February 2020 as the third single from her sixth studio album, My Reality (2021). It was written by Im and produced by Andy Mak.

Im explained the song was inspired by the strong and resilient women in her life. Im said "It is about a daughter reflecting on the character of her mother. Initially perceiving her as a person who was perfect & unafraid of anything... but then one day realising her mother was just a woman walking through the storms of life with the same frailties as herself."

Im performed the song live on stage at the Gold Coast Convention and Exhibition Centre for Eurovision – Australia Decides on 8 February 2020.

The song did not enter the ARIA top 100, but debuted at number 11 on the Australian Independent chart.

== Music video ==
The music video premiered on 13 February 2020.

== Reception ==
Frank Varrasso from Varrasso PR said "The latest offering from Dami, again showcas[es] her depth as a lyricist and her powerful vocals. Dami continues her collaborations with producer Andy Mak who masterfully highlights the fragility and strength to the vocals."

== Charts ==
| Chart (2020) | Peak position |
|---|---|
| Australia Independent (AIR) | 11 |
