= Stormy Weather (EP) =

EP by Dami Im
- Released: 12 June 2026
- Length: 22:16
- Label: Dami Army
- Producer: Mike Tan

Dami Im chronology
| Christmas Songbook (2023) | Stormy Weather (2026) |

Stormy Weather is the seventh extended play by Australian singer Dami Im. The EP was announced in March 2026 released on 12 June 2026, with Im saying she is "leaning into my jazz era" upon announcement. The EP was recorded alongside a live jazz trio and string arrangements.

In May 2026, Im spoke to Eurovision-website Aussievision, "I love the nostalgia that jazz brings. I love jazz chords and arrangements. My manager is like 'No one likes jazz' but I'm like this is the jazz that I think is enjoyable. I'm probably a basic b*tch. I like nice fun music, not like crazy saxophone solos that go on for 20 minutes. This is my gift to you, jazz that you will not hate." Im continued in June 2026 saying "Musically, it's a return to where it all began for me: a love of timeless melodies, jazz influences, and honest storytelling. After years of touring, evolving and exploring different musical paths, this feels like coming back to the house I grew up in- familiar, imperfect, and full of heart."

The EP was supported with a 10-date sold out Australian Stormy Weather tour in June and July 2026. The EP debuted at number 36 on the ARIA Charts.

== Track listing ==
| No. | Title | Writer(s) | Length |
|---|---|---|---|
| 1. | "Blue Chalk (Fly)" | Dami Im; Josh Beattie; Dana Lowrey-Palmer | 3:35 |
| 2. | "Proud of Me" | Im; Beattie; Amela Duheric | 3:05 |
| 3. | "Sight of You" | Im; Beattie; Lowrey-Palmer | 3:40 |
| 4. | "Bubble" | Im; Beattie; Duheric | 3:16 |
| 5. | "Stormy Weather" | Harold Arlen; Ted Koehler | 4:31 |
| 6. | "Music Keeps the Score" | Im | 3:48 |

== Charts ==
Weekly chart performance for Stormy Weather
| Chart (2026) | Peak position |
|---|---|
| Australian Albums (ARIA) | 36 |
