= Dami Im (album) =

Studio album by Dami Im
- Released: 15 November 2013
- Recorded: 2013
- Genres: Pop, R&B
- Length: 38:29
- Label: Sony
- Producers: DNA Songs; Dorian West

Dami Im chronology
| Dream (2011) | Dami Im (2013) | Heart Beats (2014) |

Singles from Dami Im
- 1. "Alive" Released: 28 October 2013

Professional ratings
Review scores
| Source | Rating |
|---|---|
| Renowned for Sound | 4.5/5 stars |

Dami Im is the second studio album by Dami Im, the winner of the fifth season of The X Factor Australia, released through Sony Music Australia on 15 November 2013. The album debuted at number one on the ARIA Albums Chart and was certified Platinum by the Australian Recording Industry Association for shipments of 70,000 copies. It was preceded by the lead single "Alive", which debuted at number one on the ARIA Singles Chart and was certified Platinum for selling 70,000 copies. Im became the first X Factor Australia contestant in ARIA Charts history to follow up a number one single with a number one album.

== Commercial performance ==
Dami Im debuted at number one on the ARIA Albums Chart with 23,355 copies sold in its first week, becoming the first number-one album by an X Factor Australia contestant. It was certified Platinum by the Australian Recording Industry Association in its second week for shipments of 70,000 copies. As of 2013, the album has sold 78,000 in Australia.

== Track listing ==
| No. | Title | Writer(s) | Producer(s) | Length |
|---|---|---|---|---|
| 1. | "Alive" | Anthony Egizii; David Musumeci | DNA Songs | 3:56 |
| 2. | "One" | Bono | Dorian West | 3:43 |
| 3. | "Purple Rain" | Prince | Dorian West | 3:16 |
| 4. | "Don't Leave Me This Way" | Kenneth Gamble; Leon Huff; Cary Gilbert | Dorian West | 3:50 |
| 5. | "Roar" | Katy Perry; Lukasz Gottwald; Max Martin; Bonnie McKee; Henry Russell Walter | Dorian West | 3:45 |
| 6. | "Bridge over Troubled Waters" | Paul Simon | Dorian West | 3:35 |
| 7. | "Wrecking Ball" | Gottwald; Maureen Anne McDonald; Stephan Moccio; Sacha Skarbek; Walter | Dorian West | 3:23 |
| 8. | "Hero" | Mariah Carey; Walter Afanasieff | Dorian West | 3:34 |
| 9. | "And I'm Telling You" | Tom Eyen; Henry Krieger | Dorian West | 2:55 |
| 10. | "Best of You" | Dave Grohl; Taylor Hawkins; Nate Mendel; Chris Shiflett | Dorian West | 3:27 |
| 11. | "Saving All My Love for You" | Michael Masser; Gerry Goffin | Dorian West | 3:05 |

== Charts ==
=== Weekly charts ===
| Chart (2013) | Peak position |
|---|---|
| Australian Albums (ARIA) | 1 |
| South Korean International Albums (Gaon) | 9 |

=== Year-end charts ===
| Chart (2013) | Position |
|---|---|
| Australian Albums (ARIA) | 17 |
| Australian Artist Albums (ARIA) | 4 |

== Certifications ==
| Region | Certification | Certified units/sales |
|---|---|---|
| Australia (ARIA) | Platinum | 70,000^{^} |
^{^} Shipments figures based on certification alone.

== Release history ==
| Country | Date | Format | Label |
|---|---|---|---|
| Australia | 15 November 2013 | CD; digital download | Sony Music Australia |
| United States | 27 September 2014 | CD; digital download | Sony Music |
| South Korea | 22 November 2013 | CD; digital download | Sony Music Korea |
| South Korea | 26 November 2013 | CD | Sony Music Korea |

== See also ==
- List of number-one albums of 2013 (Australia)
