= My Reality =

Studio album by Dami Im
- Released: 29 October 2021
- Recorded: 2019–2021
- Length: 33:38
- Label: ABC Music
- Producers: Dami Im, Michael Tan, One Above, Andy Mak, Konstantin Kersting, Garrett Kato

Dami Im chronology
Live Sessions (2019)	My Reality (2021)	In Between (2023)

Singles from My Reality
- 1. "Crying Underwater" Released: 13 September 2019; 2. "Kiss You Anyway" Released: 3 January 2020; 3. "Marching On" Released: 7 February 2020; 4. "Paper Dragon" Released: 18 September 2020; 5. "Lonely Cactus" Released: 19 February 2021; 6. "Pray" Released: 8 October 2021

My Reality is the sixth studio album by Australian singer Dami Im, released on 29 October 2021. It is her first album released on ABC Music.

== Background and release ==
In 2013, Im became the winner of the fifth season of The X Factor Australia and subsequently received a contract with Sony Music Australia. Between 2013 and 2018, Im released four studio albums with Sony, all of which peaked within the ARIA top ten. In 2019 Im won the Australian Women in Music Awards Humanitarian Award.

On 31 August 2020, Im confirmed she had signed with ABC Music and announced a new album was scheduled for 2021.

On 8 October 2021, Im released "Pray" and announced her sixth studio album My Reality. Upon announcement, Im said "A few years ago I wasn't mature enough to steer my albums the way I wanted them to go. This is the dream album, it took a while but I'm so proud of it. This album is about owning who I am. You shouldn't shy away from the things people like about you. But you are who you are. Some parts on this record people might expect, some others show how much I've changed. With this album I'm just trying to be authentic in the way I know it, that's my reality."

== Reception ==
Professional ratings
Review scores
Source	Rating
auspOp	4/5 stars

David from auspOp gave the album 4 out of 5, saying, "My Reality revealing a more honest and genuine side to Dami... Across the album, Dami has co-written all the songs, which means the lyrics are deeply personal and mean a lot more to her than ever before." David called "Paper Dragon" the highlight.

== Track listing ==
My Reality track listing
No.	Title	Writer(s)	Length
1.	"Pray"	Dami Im; Audius Mtawarira	3:53
2.	"Scared to Talk to You"	Im; Andrew Burford; Erin Marshall	3:09
3.	"Lonely Cactus"	Im; Burford; Bri Clarke	3:11
4.	"Marching On"	Im	3:00
5.	"Memories"	Im	3:22
6.	"Crying Underwater"	Im; Michael Tan	3:39
7.	"Paper Dragon"	Im; Elanor Witt	3:04
8.	"Alone"	Im; Garrett Kato	4:06
9.	"Kiss You Anyway"	Im; Tan	3:35
10.	"Fire"	Im	2:39
Total length:			33:38

== Charts ==
Chart performance for My Reality
Chart (2021)	Peak position
Australian Albums (ARIA)	12

== Release history ==
Release history for My Reality
Country	Date	Format	Label	Catalogue
Australia	29 October 2021	CD; digital download; streaming	Dami Army / ABC Music	5419711550
