= Fighting for Love (song) =

Single by Dami Im
- Released: 21 October 2016
- Genre: Pop
- Length: 3:33
- Label: Sony Music Australia
- Songwriters: Dami Im; Anthony Egizii; David Musumeci
- Producer: DNA

Dami Im singles chronology
"Sound of Silence" (2016)	"Fighting for Love" (2016)	"Hold Me in Your Arms" (2017)

Music video
- "Fighting for Love" on YouTube

"Fighting for Love" is a single by Australian recording artist Dami Im, released on 21 October 2016. Upon its release, "Fighting for Love" debuted at number 64 on the Australian ARIA Singles Chart.

Im said "Fighting for Love" was partly inspired by her own struggles to fit in after immigrating to Australia from South Korea at the age of nine.

Im performed the song live on The X Factor Australia on 7 November 2016.

In 2017, the song won the OGAE Song Contest, organized by the official Eurovision Song Contest fan club.

== Track listing ==
- Digital download
1. "Fighting for Love" – 3:33
- CD single
1. "Fighting for Love" – 3:33
2. "Fighting for Love" (instrumental) – 3:33
- 7th Heaven Remix
1. "Fight for Love" (7th Heaven Remix) – 3:27

== Charts ==
Chart (2016)	Peak position
Australia (ARIA)	64

== Release history ==
Country	Date	Format	Version(s)	Label
Australia	21 October 2016	Digital download	Main version	Sony Music Australia
Australia	4 November 2016	CD single	Main version / Instrumental	Sony Music Australia
Australia	18 November 2016	Digital download	7th Heaven Remix	Sony Music Australia
