= Denis Handlin =

Australian entrepreneur and business executive

Denis Handlin AO
- Born: Denis Anthony Handlin; 1951 (age 74–75); Brisbane, Queensland Australia
- Occupations: A&R executive; concert promoter
- Years active: 1970–2021
- Spouse: Jan
- Children: 6

Denis Anthony Handlin AO (born 1951) is an Australian former entrepreneur and business executive who served as chairman and chief executive officer of Sony Music Entertainment Australia and New Zealand and president of Sony Music Entertainment Asia Inc, commencing employment in the company in 1970 until 5 June 2021, making him the longest-serving global Sony Music employee.

In October 2021, the Australian current affairs television program Four Corners interviewed over 100 Sony Music employees who alleged abuse, intimidation and bullying perpetrated by Handlin.

== Early life and education ==
Handlin was born in Brisbane in 1951 and educated at St Joseph's College, Gregory Terrace.

== Career ==
In May 1970, Handlin started in the Distribution Division in Brisbane within the Australian Record Company (later known as CBS Records International, Sony BMG now Sony Music Australia). In 1976, Handlin moved to Sydney. On 1 January 1985, Handlin became Managing Director and Chief Executive Officer of CBS Records Australia. In February 1996, Handlin became Chairman of Sony Music Entertainment Australia Limited. In September 2010, Handlin was appointed President, South East Asia & Korea for Sony Music Entertainment. In August 2011 he became the company's President, Asia.

In 2005 at the Australia Day Honours List, Handlin was appointed a Member of the Order of Australia (AM). In June 2017 at the Queen's Birthday Honours List, Handlin was elevated to and awarded the Officer of the Order of Australia (AO), in recognition of "for distinguished service to the Australian recording industry, through leadership and mentoring roles, as a supporter of young artists, and to charitable organisations as a director, patron and contributor".

In February 2018, Handlin was announced as "the Number 1 most influential figure in the Australian music industry" by music industry publication, The Music.

On 21 June 2021, it was announced that Handlin was leaving the company. His departure was effective immediately and was announced by Sony Music's global boss Rob Stringer in an internal email. As he no longer worked at Sony Music, he could no longer be on the ARIA board and exited immediately.

== Bullying and harassment allegations ==
In October 2021, the Australian current affairs television program Four Corners aired interviews with Sony Music employees who alleged abuse, intimidation and bullying perpetrated by Handlin during his years in charge at Sony Music Australia. Handlin was alleged to have routinely singled out members of staff for humiliation and intimidation, which left many "traumatised" and resulted in rates of close to 50 per cent annual turnover of staff at the company by the late 1990s. Former head of human resources at Sony Music Australia Greg Lockhart likened working under Handlin to being a "servant" who did not work for Sony Music but rather "Handlin and the 'cult' of his personality".

Despite fostering the careers of such female artists as Delta Goodrem, Handlin was alleged to have encouraged a "laddish" culture where female employees were regularly objectified, with Handlin himself alleged to have made sexualised comments about their appearances. He is also alleged to have ordered employees to be fired for "not smiling at him", because he did not like the "look" of them, or for being pregnant, with seven women made redundant while on maternity leave in the period between 2007 and 2013, and "paid cash settlements" following their termination from the company. Lockhart also alleged he was instructed by Handlin to hire private investigators to follow staff. Several anonymous former female employees also alleged they were sexually harassed and assaulted during their time at the company. Handlin said in a statement that while in charge of the company he "would never tolerate treating women in an inappropriate or discriminatory manner" and when informed of incidents, he "took action to ensure that it was stopped and didn't occur again".

Handlin was previously suspended by the Sony Music head office in 1998, with 10 executives flown out to Sony Music's global headquarters in New York City for one-on-one interviews regarding Handlin's conduct. Handlin was reinstated three months later, after which the alleged bullying, harassment and routine humiliation of Sony Music Australia staff continued; nine of the 10 interviewed executives left the company within four years. Due to this, Lockhart called Sony Music's global headquarters' claim it only found out about Handlin's behaviour in 2021 "implausible", and called for the "global head office [to] be held accountable for ignoring the welfare of its Australian staff for decades".

== Personal life ==
Handlin married his wife Jan in 1977 and together they have six children.

Handlin has been a mentor of the Queensland State of Origin series rugby league team since 2006.

== Awards and achievements ==
Handlin has been honored with several awards for his work in the Australian entertainment industry.

Year	Nominee	Ceremony	Award	Result	Ref.
1996	Denis Handlin	Sony Music Entertainment	CEO Special Recognition Award	awarded	
2005	Denis Handlin	Queen's Birthday Honours	Member of the Order of Australia	awarded	
2009	Denis Handlin	APRA Awards (Australia)	Ted Albert Award for Outstanding Services to Australian Music	revoked	
2012	Denis Handlin	Worldwide Radio Summit Industry Awards	Label Executive of the Year – Major	awarded	
2014	Denis Handlin	ARIA Music Awards	Icon Awards	revoked	
2017	Denis Handlin	Queen's Birthday Honours	Officer of the Order of Australia	awarded	
2020	Denis Handlin	Queensland Music Awards	QMusic Honorary Award	revoked	
