= I Hear a Song (album) =

Studio album by Dami Im
- Released: 23 March 2018
- Recorded: 2017, Nashville, Tennessee
- Label: Sony Music Australia
- Producer: Rick Price

Dami Im chronology
Classic Carpenters (2016)	I Hear a Song (2018)	Live Sessions (2019)

I Hear a Song is the fifth studio album by Australian recording artist Dami Im released on 23 March 2018 by Sony Music Australia. The album is made up of 12 cover songs and 2 original tracks. The album was announced on 16 February 2018 with Im saying “Before you listen to the album it might look like an unusual combination of songs but I recorded every tune with the same desire, which was to share the stories of these amazing women, the most raw and simple way, through a microphone and my fingers on the black and white keys." In April, Im said: "You wouldn't call it like a serious jazz record, but it has that flavour, it has all that vibe that I used to have before this pop thing came along."

The album was supported by the I Hear a Song Tour commencing in April 2018.

== Reception ==
Professional ratings
Review scores
Source	Rating
auspOp	4/5 stars
news.com.au	3/5 stars

Cameron Adams from news.com.au gave the album 3 out of 5 stars, writing: "While The Carpenters [cover album] made her sound old before her time, this one works well. Jazzy gems from everyone from Beyoncé to Nina Simone to Norah Jones to Bonnie Raitt. Two originals suggest Dami is more down with 'bebop' than 'dance pop' now." David from auspOp gave the album 4 out of 5, saying: "I Hear a Song is a successful outing featuring music that feels genuinely 'Dami'. This is a really cohesive and mature sounding album. It's not about big bold brash tunes, it's more in the subtlety of the arrangements in each song." He called "Come Away with Me" the album highlight.

== Track listing ==
No.	Title	Writer(s)	Length
1.	"Feeling Good"	Anthony Newley; Leslie Bricusse	3:55
2.	"I Hear a Song"	Dami Im; Rick Price	2:44
3.	"I Say a Little Prayer"	Burt Bacharach; Hal David	3:41
4.	"Summertime"	DuBose Heyward; George & Ira Gershwin	3:31
5.	"My Funny Valentine"	Richard Rodgers; Lorenz Hart	3:49
6.	"Love On Top"	Beyoncé Knowles; Terius Nash; Shea Taylor	3:49
7.	"You Don't Have to Say You Love Me"	Vicki Wickham; Simon Napier-Bell; Pino Donaggio; Vito Pallavicini	3:49
8.	"Come Away with Me"	Norah Jones	3:11
9.	"Cry Me a River"	Arthur Hamilton	4:11
10.	"I Can't Make You Love Me"	Mike Reid; Allen Shamblin	4:22
11.	"God Bless the Child"	Billie Holiday; Arthur Herzog, Jr.	4:40
12.	"Autumn Leaves"	Joseph Kosma; Johnny Mercer; Jacques Prévert	3:58
13.	"Round Midnight"	Bernie Hangmen; Cootie Williams; Thelonious Monk	4:28
14.	"Like a Cello"	Im	3:02

== Charts ==
=== Weekly charts ===
Chart (2018)	Peak position
Australian Albums (ARIA)	3
Australian Artist Albums (ARIA)	1
South Korean International Albums (Gaon)	11

=== Year-end charts ===
Chart (2018)	Position
Australian Top Jazz & Blues Albums (ARIA)	3
Chart (2019)	Position
Australian Top Jazz & Blues Albums (ARIA)	16
Chart (2020)	Position
Australian Top Jazz & Blues Albums (ARIA)	37
Chart (2021)	Position
Australian Jazz and Blues Albums (ARIA)	44

== Release history ==
Country	Date	Format	Label	Catalogue
Australia	23 March 2018	CD; digital download; streaming	Sony Music Australia	88985468012
