= Sound of Silence (Dami Im song) =

2016 song by Dami Im

Single by Dami Im
- Released: 11 March 2016
- Recorded: 2016
- Genre: Pop
- Length: 3:15
- Label: Sony
- Songwriters: Anthony Egizii; David Musumeci
- Producer: DNA

Dami Im singles chronology
| "Smile" (2015) | "Sound of Silence" (2016) | "Fighting for Love" (2016) |

Music video
- "Sound of Silence" on YouTube

Eurovision Song Contest 2016 entry
- Country: Australia
- Artist: Dami Im
- Language: English
- Composers: Anthony Egizii, David Musumeci
- Lyricists: Anthony Egizii, David Musumeci

Finals performance
- Semi-final result: 1st
- Semi-final points: 330
- Final result: 2nd
- Final points: 511

Entry chronology
- ◄ "Tonight Again" (2015)
- "Don't Come Easy" (2017) ►

Official performance videos
- "Sound of Silence" (second semi-final) on YouTube "Sound of Silence" (grand final) on YouTube

"Sound of Silence" is a song performed by the Australian recording artist Dami Im. Written by Anthony Egizii and David Musumeci of DNA Songs, it is best known as Australia's entry at the Eurovision Song Contest 2016 which was held in Stockholm, Sweden, where it finished 2nd, receiving a total of 511 points. The song also won the Marcel Bezençon Award in the composer category. The song was leaked on 10 March 2016, one day before its initial release date. It is Dami Im's fourth Australian top 20 hit and worldwide, it reached the top 40 in more than six countries after the Eurovision Song Contest 2016 Final.

== Track listing ==
Digital download
| No. | Title | Length |
|---|---|---|
| 1. | "Sound of Silence" | 3:15 |

Short edit
| No. | Title | Length |
|---|---|---|
| 1. | "Sound of Silence" (Short edit) | 3:04 |

Remixes – Single
| No. | Title | Length |
|---|---|---|
| 1. | "Sound of Silence" (7th Heaven Club Mix) | 7:57 |
| 2. | "Sound of Silence" (7th Heaven Radio Edit) | 4:18 |

Other versions (Sony promo release)

- Glamstarr Club Mix – 6:26
- Glamstarr Radio Edit – 3:49
- Glamstarr Instrumental – 6:26

== Charts ==
| Chart (2016) | Peak position |
|---|---|
| Australia (ARIA) | 5 |
| Austria (Ö3 Austria Top 40) | 39 |
| Belgium (Ultratip Bubbling Under Flanders) | 10 |
| Finland Download (Latauslista) | 11 |
| France (SNEP) | 69 |
| Germany (GfK) | 57 |
| Iceland (RÚV) | 9 |
| Netherlands (Single Top 100) | 100 |
| Scottish Singles Sales (Official Charts) | 53 |
| Spain (Promusicae) | 37 |
| Sweden (Sverigetopplistan) | 17 |
| Switzerland (Schweizer Hitparade) | 55 |
| UK Singles Downloads (Official Charts) | 54 |
| UK Singles (Official Charts) | 160 |

== Certifications ==
| Region | Certification | Certified units/sales |
|---|---|---|
| Australia (ARIA) | Platinum | 70,000^{‡} |
| Sweden (GLF) | Gold | 20,000^{‡} |
^{‡} Sales+streaming figures based on certification alone.
