= Jude York =

Australian singer-songwriter (born 1999)

- Born: Jeremy Beamish; April 16, 1999 (age 27); Toowoomba, Queensland, Australia
- Origin: Toowoomba, Queensland, Australia
- Genres: Pop, Indie pop
- Occupations: Singer, songwriter, producer
- Instruments: Vocals, piano, guitar
- Years active: 2022–present
- Labels: Spinnin’ Records, Warner Music

Jeremy Beamish (born April 16, 1999), known professionally as Jude York, is an Australian singer-songwriter and self-producing musician from Toowoomba, Queensland. He is known for emotionally driven pop and indie-pop songs, and for leveraging social-media virality to break into the international music scene.

== Early life ==
York was raised in Toowoomba, Queensland, in a musical family. His mother was an opera singer and his father a jingle-writer and composer. He began performing as a child alongside his mother in jazz bars and local venues, and the household environment nurtured his early interest in songwriting and production.

== Career ==
=== 2022–2023: Breakthrough and early releases ===
In 2022, York competed in the national selection for the Eurovision 2022 – Australia Decides with his ballad “I Won’t Need to Dream”, finishing in 8th place. He followed this with independent releases including “Mr Porcelain” and “Cashew”, which found traction on streaming platforms and via TikTok. By October 2023, his track “All My Friends Hate Me” featured on triple j Unearthed.

=== 2024–present: Viral success and international touring ===
In 2024, York’s single “Those Were The Days” was released via Spinnin’ Records and Warner Music. The track blends a dance-pop production with a nostalgic melody derived from an Eastern European folk tune. It went viral on TikTok with over 4 million views and 300,000 likes in its early life. Under his own production control, York has gathered millions of streams and begun performing in Europe and the UK, including appearances at major festivals such as the Mighty Hoopla (London), Sziget Festival (Budapest) and the Reeperbahn Festival (Hamburg).

=== Artistic style and influences ===
York describes his music as grounded in nostalgia, vulnerable storytelling and self-produced pop. He cites ABBA and classic jazz/pop vocalists among his early influences, reflecting his upbringing in a musically-rich household.

== Live performances and touring ==
York has toured internationally, supporting Dean Lewis on his European tour, and headlining shows in Australia and Europe. He sold out venues in the UK and Europe and performed at major festivals including Mighty Hoopla, Sziget and Reeperbahn.

== Personal life ==
Whilst based in Australia, York has spent significant time in Europe due to touring and label commitments. He remains active on social media, maintaining a close connection with his fanbase. He attributes his early vocal and performance training to his mother, an opera singer, noting that his musical family background shaped his artistic development. York also forms the music duo "The Beamish Brothers" with his brother Benjamin Beamish.

== Discography ==
=== Extended plays ===
List of EPs, with selected details
Title	Details
Heartstrings	Released: 23 May 2024; Label: Spinnin' Records

== Awards and recognition ==
=== Vanda & Young Global Songwriting Competition ===
The Vanda & Young Global Songwriting Competition is an annual competition that "acknowledges great songwriting whilst supporting and raising money for Nordoff-Robbins" and is coordinated by Albert Music and APRA AMCOS. It commenced in 2009.

Year	Nominee / work	Award	Result	Ref.
2025	"Almost Me Almost You"	Unpublished Award	Won	
