= Dami Im =

Australian singer and songwriter (born 1988)

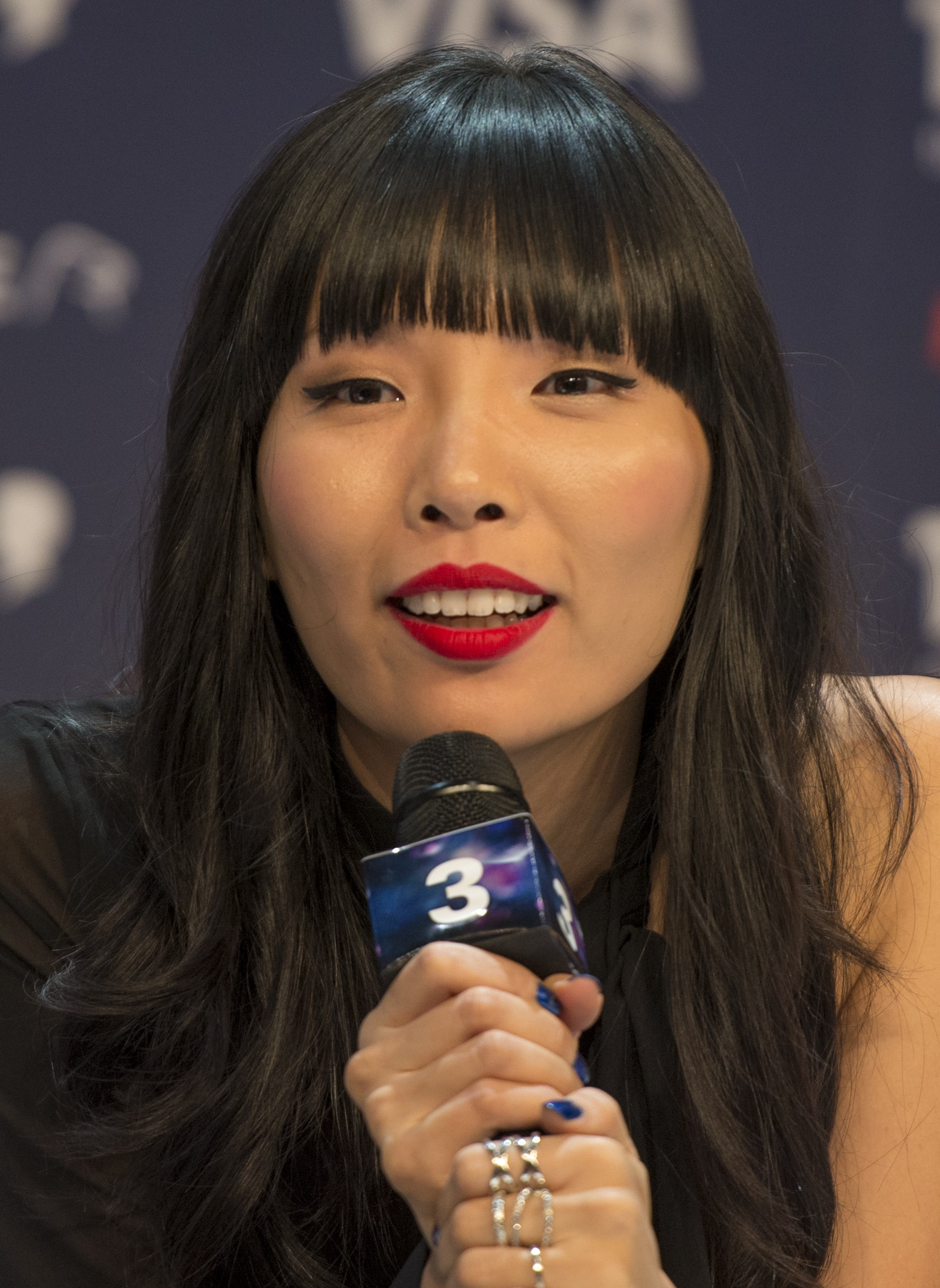
- Im in 2016

Background information
- Born: Im Da-mi; 17 October 1988 (age 38); Seoul, South Korea
- Origin: Brisbane, Queensland, Australia
- Genres: Pop; R&B; soul; gospel
- Occupations: Singer, songwriter
- Years active: 2005–present
- Labels: Sony (2013–2019); ABC Music (2020–present)
- Spouse: Noah Kim (m. 2012)
- Website: damiim.com

Korean name
- Hangul: 임다미
- RR: Im Dami
- MR: Im Tami

Dami Im (/ˌdɑːmi ˈɪm/ DAH-mee IM; Korean: 임다미; IPA: [im dami]; born 17 October 1988) is an Australian-Korean singer and songwriter. She represented Australia at the Eurovision Song Contest 2016 held in Stockholm, Sweden with the song "Sound of Silence", placing second and achieving the highest Eurovision Song Contest score for Australia.

Born in South Korea, Im emigrated to Australia with her family at the age of nine. She won the fifth season of The X Factor Australia and subsequently received a recording contract with Sony Music Australia. In 2020 she left Sony Music and signed with ABC Music.

After winning The X Factor, Im released her debut and winner's single "Alive", which debuted at number one on the ARIA Singles Chart. This was followed by the release of her self-titled second studio album, which debuted at number one on the ARIA Albums Chart and was certified platinum by the Australian Recording Industry Association. Im became the first X Factor Australia contestant to follow up a number one single with a number one album on the ARIA Charts. Im's third studio album, Heart Beats, was released in 2014 and became her second top-ten album. It produced the top-twenty hits "Super Love" and "Gladiator".

== Early life ==
Dami Im was born in Seoul on 17 October 1988 to Lee Hae-yun, a trained opera singer, and Im Dong-eal. She is the elder of two children. Im began learning the piano at the age of five, and she taught herself to sing by recording herself copying her favourite artists. Aged nine, Im emigrated to Australia with her mother and younger brother Kenny because their parents thought they would have more opportunity growing up in Australia. They stayed with their uncle in Brisbane, while her father stayed in South Korea to support them. Im's parents now live together, spending part of the year in Australia and part in South Korea.

Aged 11, Im began studying piano at the Young Conservatorium of Music program at Griffith University. She was a national finalist in the Yamaha Youth Piano Competition, and won the Nora Baird Scholarship and the Queensland Piano Competition several times. Im attended John Paul College in Daisy Hill, Queensland and graduated in 2005. She never sang while at school and would only accompany the choir on piano, and play violin for the school's Silver Strings group. In 2009, Im graduated from the University of Queensland with first class honours in a Bachelor of Music. She subsequently completed a Masters of Music Studies degree in contemporary voice at Griffith University. In 2025, Griffith University awarded Im an Honorary Doctorate (DUniv) for her distinguished service to the Arts. At Griffith University, Im was trained by Irene Bartlett and Sharny Russell, lecturer and voice coach who also trained a number of other well-known Australian vocalists such as Katie Noonan, Megan Washington, Kristin Berardi, and Elly Hoyt. Prior to entering The X Factor, Im was a gospel singer and occasionally taught piano and voice to support herself during this time.

== Career ==
=== 2010–2012: Early career ===
Im had a short career as a gospel singer in South Korea, performing at Christian youth camps. In 2010, she released her debut studio album, Dream, which consisted of nine tracks and was recorded to raise money for church endeavours. In July 2011, Im re-released the album with two extra tracks, which were both sung in English. On 5 December 2011, Im released a Christmas extended play called Snow & Carol, which consisted of seven tracks. On 9 July 2012, Im released her second extended play, Intimacy, which consisted of five tracks.

=== 2013: The X Factor Australia ===
In 2013, Im successfully auditioned for the fifth season of The X Factor Australia, singing "Hero" by Mariah Carey. She progressed to the super bootcamp round of the competition and was placed in the Girls category. On the first day of bootcamp, Im sang "I'm with You" by Avril Lavigne in front of her entire category and judges Redfoo, Ronan Keating and Dannii Minogue. On the second day of bootcamp, she was put into an ensemble of 10 and they sang "Next to Me" by Emeli Sandé in front of the judges. Im made it to the third day of bootcamp, where she sang "Jolene" by Dolly Parton to the judges and a live audience of one thousand. After the judges made changes to the Boys, Girls and Over 25s categories, Im became part of the newly formed Over 24s category and was eliminated. However, Im was called back for the home visits round in New York City to replace Matt Gresham who decided he could not commit to the competition. During home visits, she sang "If I Were a Boy" by Beyoncé in front of her mentor Minogue and guest mentor Kylie Minogue. Minogue later selected Im, along with Barry Southgate and Cat Vas, for the live finals—a series of ten weekly live shows in which contestants are progressively eliminated by public vote.

For the Judges' Choice-themed first live show, Im sang "One" by U2 and received a standing ovation from the judges, with Natalie Bassingthwaighte saying she had "the best vocal of the night". Im's performance of "One" peaked at number 42 on the ARIA Singles Chart. For the Legends-themed second live show, she sang "Purple Rain" by Prince and received another standing ovation. Keating told Im that the competition "at the moment, is yours". Her performance of "Purple Rain" debuted at number 29 on the ARIA Singles Chart. For the Top 10 Hits-themed third live show, Im sang Thelma Houston's version of "Don't Leave Me This Way", and her performance of the song debuted on the ARIA Singles Chart at number 67. Following the eliminations of Vas in week two and Southgate in week three, Im became the last remaining contestant in Minogue's category. After her performance of Katy Perry's "Roar" in the Latest and Greatest-themed fourth live show, Im received her fourth consecutive standing ovation from the judges. Im's performance of "Roar" debuted at number 44 on the ARIA Singles Chart. For the Rock-themed fifth live show, she sang "Best of You" by the Foo Fighters and received her fifth standing ovation. Im's performance of "Best of You" debuted at number 78 on the ARIA Singles Chart.

Following Im's performance of Simon & Garfunkel's "Bridge over Troubled Water" during the Family Heroes-themed sixth live show, her mentor Minogue notably teared up as she dedicated Im's song choice to her parents and grandfather, following the death of her grandmother. Im's performance of "Bridge over Troubled Water" debuted at number 15 on the ARIA Singles Chart. For the Judges' Challenge-themed seventh live show, Im sang Zedd's "Clarity", which was chosen by Keating, and her performance debuted at number 77 on the ARIA Singles Chart. Im received a mixed feedback from the judges following her performance of John Farnham's "You're the Voice" during the Aussie Week-themed eighth live show. Keating said "it was pitchy and a weak performance" and Bassingthwaighte agreed. For the Power and Passion-themed ninth live show, Im sang "Saving All My Love for You" by Whitney Houston and "Wrecking Ball" by Miley Cyrus. Her performances of "Wrecking Ball" and "Saving All My Love for You" debuted on the ARIA Singles Chart at numbers 61 and 85, respectively.

During the grand final performance show on 27 October, Im was required to perform three songs – her audition song ("Hero"), winner's single ("Alive") and last shot song ("And I Am Telling You I'm Not Going"). Her performance of "And I Am Telling You I'm Not Going", which debuted at number 29 on the ARIA Singles Chart, got all four judges standing on the judges table. Redfoo said Im's performance was "the best thing I've ever seen in my life", while Minogue added that she is "world class". Im's performance of "Hero" debuted at number 62. During the grand final decider show the following day, Im was announced as the winner.

denotes a performance that entered the ARIA Singles
denotes winner

==== Performances on The X Factor ====
Show	Song choice	Original Artist	Theme	Result
Auditions	"Hero"	Mariah Carey	—N/a	Through to Super bootcamp
Super bootcamp	"I'm with You"	Avril Lavigne	—N/a	Through to second day of bootcamp
Super bootcamp	"Next to Me"	Emeli Sandé	—N/a	Through to third day of bootcamp
Super bootcamp	"Jolene"	Dolly Parton	—N/a	Through to Home Visits as Matt Gresham's replacement
Home visits	"If I Were a Boy"	Beyoncé	—N/a	Through to Live shows
Week 1	"One"	U2	Judges' Choice	Safe (1st)
Week 2	"Purple Rain"	Prince	Legends	Safe (1st)
Week 3	"Don't Leave Me This Way"	Harold Melvin and the Blue Notes	Top 10 Hits	Safe (1st)
Week 4	"Roar"	Katy Perry	Latest and Greatest	Safe (1st)
Week 5	"Best of You"	Foo Fighters	Rock	Safe (1st)
Week 6	"Bridge over Troubled Water"	Simon & Garfunkel	Family Heroes	Safe (1st)
Week 7	"Clarity"	Zedd & Foxes	Judges' Challenge	Safe (1st)
Quarter-Final	"You're the Voice"	John Farnham	Aussie Week	Safe (1st)
Semi-Final	"Saving All My Love for You"	Whitney Houston	Power and Passion	Safe (1st)
Semi-Final	"Wrecking Ball"	Miley Cyrus	Power and Passion	Safe (1st)
Final	"Hero"	Mariah Carey	Audition song	Safe (1st)
Final	"And I Am Telling You I'm Not Going"	Jennifer Holliday	Last shot song	Safe (1st)
Final	"Alive"	Dami Im	Winner's single	Safe (1st)
Final	"Purple Rain"	Prince	Best song from the live shows	Winner

=== 2013–2015: Dami Im and Heart Beats ===
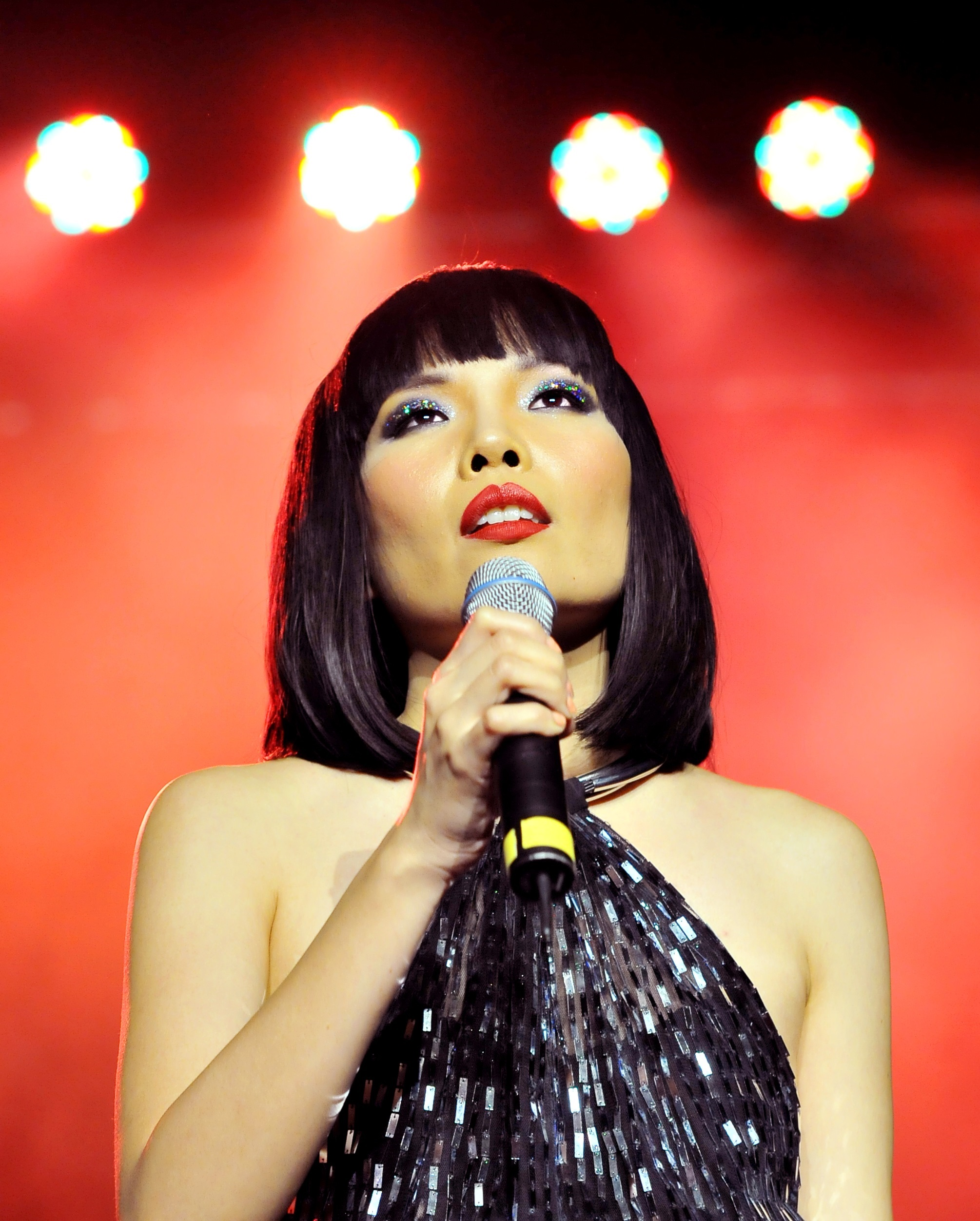
Im performing at The X Factor Live Tour in November 2013

After winning The X Factor, Im's debut and winner's single "Alive" was released on the iTunes Store. She also received a recording contract with Sony Music Australia and a management deal. Four days after release, "Alive" debuted at number one on the ARIA Singles Chart. It was certified platinum by the Australian Recording Industry Association for selling over 70,000 copies. Im's self-titled second studio album was released on 15 November 2013 and featured studio recordings of songs she performed on The X Factor. The album debuted at number one on the ARIA Albums Chart and was certified platinum for shipments of more than 70,000 units. Im became the first X Factor Australia contestant to follow up a number one single with a number one album on the ARIA Charts. On 23 November 2013, Im toured alongside Third Degree, Taylor Henderson, Jiordan Tolli and Jai Waetford for The X Factor Live Tour, which ended on 2 December 2013. In late December 2013, she signed on as an ambassador for the children's charity Compassion Australia.

It was reported on 19 January 2014 that fashion label Alannah Hill had signed Im to be the face of their autumn and winter 2014 collection. On 24 January 2014, Im released a cover of "I Am Australian" with Henderson, Jessica Mauboy, Justice Crew, Nathaniel Willemse and Samantha Jade, to coincide with the Australia Day celebrations. The song peaked at number 51 on the ARIA Singles Chart. Im's next single, an acoustic cover of Dolly Parton's "Jolene", was released on 7 March 2014, but failed to chart. In May 2014, she became an ambassador for Priceline Pharmacy's You Beauty campaign, which celebrates the diversity of Australian women. The following month, Im became the ambassador of Nintendo's video game, Tomodachi Life. On 3 September 2014, Im performed at The Marquee in Sydney as part of Nova FM's Red Room Global Tour.

Im's third studio album, Heart Beats, was released on 17 October 2014 and debuted at number seven on the ARIA Albums Chart, becoming Im's second top-ten album. The album was preceded by the release of its first two singles, "Super Love" and "Gladiator", both of which peaked at number 11 on the ARIA Singles Chart. The former also reached the top-twenty on the South Korea Gaon Charts and was certified platinum, while the latter was certified gold for selling over 35,000 copies. In December 2014, Im was the supporting act for John Legend's Australian leg of his All of Me Tour. Im's sixth lead single "Smile" was released on 29 May 2015, and debuted at number 48. In June 2015, it was confirmed that Im was working on her upcoming fourth studio album. In 2015, Im competed on King of Mask Singer, the original version of The Masked Singer, as the Statue of Liberty. She only lasted for three rounds.

=== 2016–2018: Eurovision Song Contest, Classic Carpenters and I Hear a Song ===
Im was invited to participate in the international cast BTV Global Spring Festival Gala presentation by the Chinese BTV television station which was broadcast on the second day of Spring Festival 10 February. Im performed an acoustic rendition of "Close to You" in English and then teamed up with Chinese Kazakh singer, Tasiken (塔斯肯), to perform the popular "365 Mile Road" (三百六十五里路) as a duet, in Chinese. The pairing of Im with Tasiken in the duet performance is also notable in that they both share remarkably similar journeys in their music competition experiences. In the second series of The Voice of China competition in 2013, Tasiken was initially eliminated in the Blind Auditions round, but was later selected by coach A-mei in a second chance round. Tasiken performed well and won the Battles and Knock Out rounds, only to ultimately lose to the eventual winner of the series Li Qi (李琦) in the Playoff round. This almost mirrors Im's own experience of being eliminated in the super bootcamp round of 2013 The X-Factor Australia competition, only to be recalled to the home visits round. Im of course went on to perform very well in the subsequent Live Finals and eventually win the competition. The very popular Global Spring Festival event was reportedly one of the world's most watched TV program, broadcast to a global audience of over 200 million.

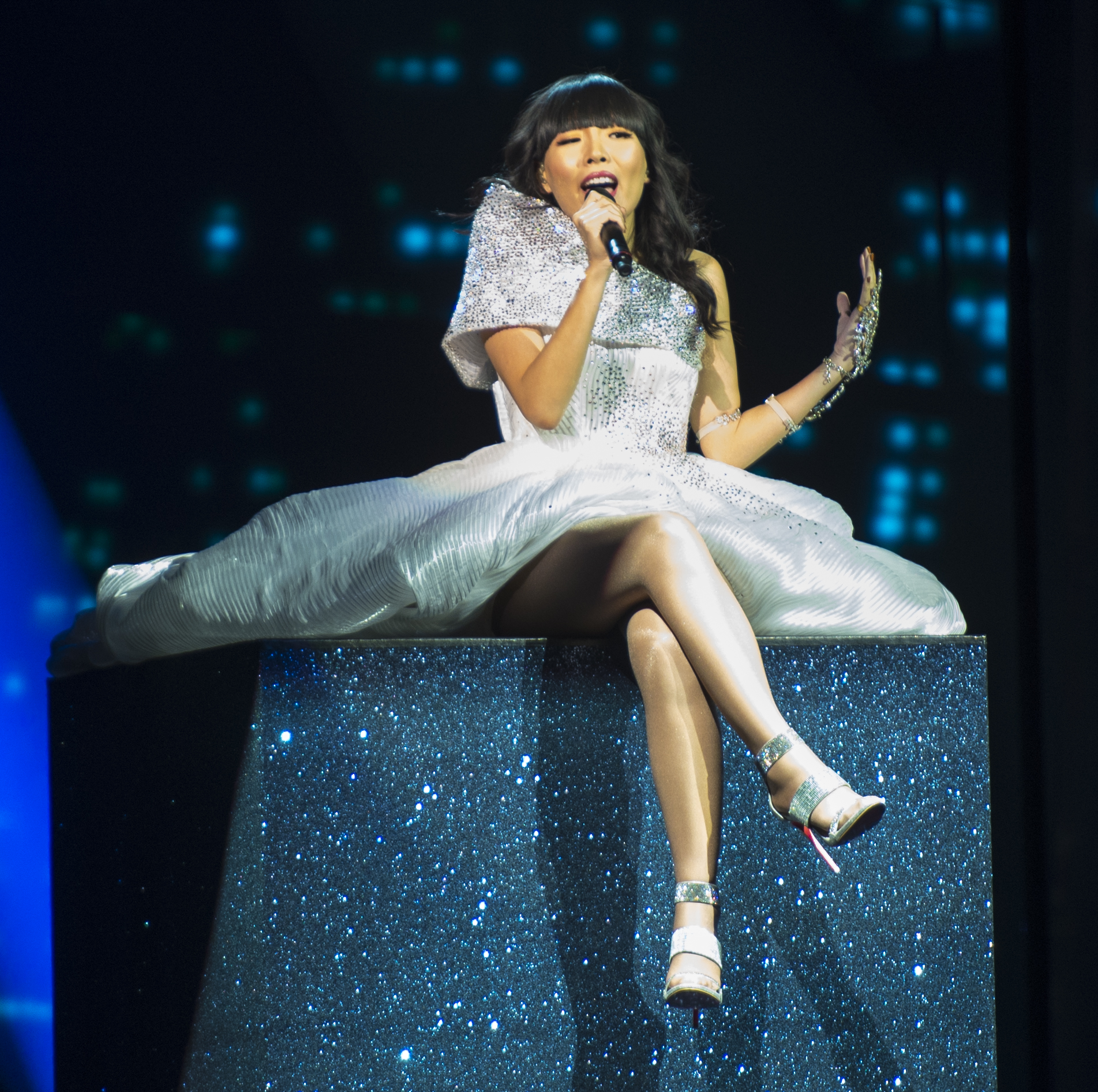
Dami Im during a rehearsal before the second semi-final

On 3 March, it was announced Im would represent Australia at the Eurovision Song Contest 2016. Her song was "Sound of Silence". On 4 March, it also announced Im would release a new album in April called Classic Carpenters. The album is a collection of cover versions of some of The Carpenters' biggest songs. It was released on 22 April 2016. Three music videos of her performing the songs "(They Long to Be) Close to You", "There's a Kind of Hush (All Over the World)" and "Yesterday Once More" were released on 14, 17 and 19 April, respectively. Classic carpenters charted with massive success on the ARIA charts gaining the chart position of Number Three, Im's third studio also gained success on the South Korean charts achieving a position of 23 within the Top 25.

At an interview, Paul Clarke, Australia's head of delegation to the Eurovision Song Contest, was asked about the potential of Im's performance at the contest. Clarke remarked that Im's journey as a migrant to Australia at the age of nine and learning English from songs of Kylie Minogue was conducive to the multiculturalism and diversity of the European competition. Clarke adds that "Im is also a lightning rod of emotion when she performs", which is something he believes will resonate with the Eurovision audience. He further notes that "She can just feel an audience and be able to be the conductor of it, better than just about any performer I've ever seen, she just does it intuitively."

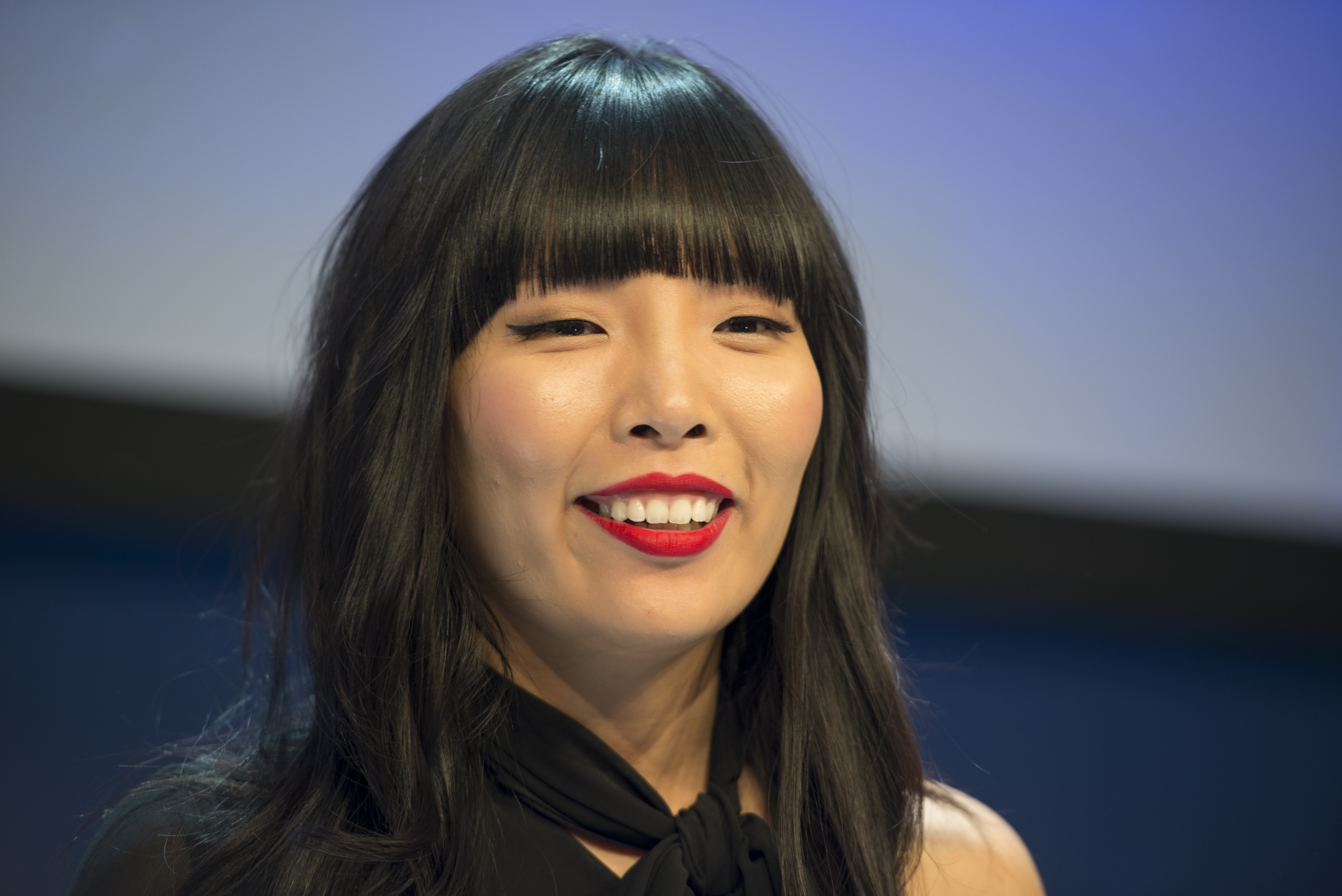
Dami Im (2016)

In the Eurovision Song Contest 2016, Im was announced to perform in second semi-final. Im performed tenth in the running order and successfully progressed to the final with the highest score and top ranking of her semi-final. As this was the first time Australia competed in the semi-final stage, Im became the first ever Australian representative to progress from the semi-final to the final. In the final, Im performed 13th in the running order and achieved the top score of 320 points from the national jury. Ultimately, she received 191 points from televoting and was announced to have gained 511 points in total, placing 2nd in the Eurovision Song Contest 2016. Im's second place score is the highest score ever achieved by an Australian representative. Following the contest, Im's single "Sound of Silence" charted at number 3 on the ARIA charts and gained huge success across Europe the single achieved two Gold certifications from the ARIA Charts and the Swedish Recording Industry Association charts respectively. Also "Sound of Silence" charted within the top fifteen in Finland and Belgium – a first for Im in her singing career, the single also charted for the first time in Im's career on the UK Charts, the Spanish, German and Austrian charts. This single is Im's most successful in her career to date. In October 2016, Im released her first post-Eurovision single, "Fighting for Love". In 2017, it was announced through various social media that THE.mgmt has signed Im to a special arrangement modeling contract with the agency.

On 7 April 2017, Im released a new recording of "Hold Me in Your Arms" with original Southern Sons singer, Jack Jones. On 9 April 2017, it was reported that Sony Music Australia CEO Denis Handlin was moved by Im's earlier live performance of the song on Australia Day with Guy Sebastian that he "spared no expense securing the original voice of the song Jack Jones (Irwin Thomas) to re-create is 1990 hit with Dami Im." On 28 April 2017, Im posted on her social media photos of herself with Sony Australia CEO Denis Handlin receiving Gold certification for Classic Carpenters and her platinum certification for "Sound of Silence". In April 2017 Im made a special guest appearance in the Brisbane production of Grease: The Arena Experience.

On 16 February 2018, Im announced her fifth studio album I Hear a Song would be released on 23 March 2018. The album charted with massive success just as her previous album did, reaching number 3 in the ARIA album chart. It also reached number one in the Australian Artist Album charts and number 11 on the Gaon Korean charts.

=== 2019: Live Sessions EP, Asia Song Festival and independent release ===
In March 2019 she released her first live EP (Live Sessions EP). She left Sony Music Australia and on 13 September 2019 released her original song "Crying Underwater" independently. Im said of the release; "There is so much pressure in today's society to always look happy so we end up feeling like we're not allowed to talk about how we really feel, Just like you're crying underwater where no one can see you crying." On 3 January 2020, Im released "Kiss You Anyway".

In October 2019, Im performed in Korea at the Asia Song Festival alongside prominent K-pop artists such as Sunmi, Eric Nam, Stray Kids and Itzy.

=== 2020–2024: Signing with ABC, Bluesfest, Dancing with the Stars, My Reality and memoir ===
In early 2020, Im was announced as a contestant on the seventeenth series of Dancing with the Stars, being paired with new professional dancer Shae Mountain. They were the sixth couple to be eliminated, placing fifth overall for the season.

On 8 February 2020, Im performed "Walk with Me" with Måns Zelmerlöw at Eurovision – Australia Decides, the event that decides Australia's entrant to the Eurovision Song Contest 2020. as well as performing her new single "Marching On" which she wrote about her mother. She made a surprise announcement that she would be competing in Australia Decides 2021, which was ultimately cancelled due to the COVID-19 pandemic.

On 31 August 2020, Im confirmed she had signed with ABC Music and announced a new album. On 17 September, she released "Paper Dragon", her first single with the new label. The song was intended to be her entry for Australia Decides 2021, which was cancelled due to the pandemic.

In mid 2021, Im appeared as a contestant on the second season of Network 10's Celebrity MasterChef Australia, where she was the second contestant to be eliminated.

Im performed for the first time at Byron Bay Bluesfest in 2021. She released her sixth studio album, My Reality, on 29 October 2021. Im released a memoir titled "Dreamer" in 2022.

In May 2023, Im announced the EP In Between, which was released on 7 July 2023.

In October 2023, Im announced her first Christmas collection, titled Christmas Songbook. The EP was released on 17 November 2023.

In 2023, Im competed on the fifth season of The Masked Singer Australia as Snow Fox, making it the second time she appeared in a version of the singing competition. She eventually won the season, after eight performances.

In July 2024, Im released a children's music album called Kid Song Collection under the alias Grace Notes.

In September 2024, Im performed a reinterpreted version of South Korean singer-songwriter Lee Sun-hee's song "Beautiful Scenery" on South Korean show Immortal Songs: Singing the Legend, alongside other artists Ben, Kai, Son Seung-yeon and Monni who performed reinterpreted songs of other artists. At the end of the episode, Im was declared the winner of the night for her performance.

=== 2025: "Bubble" ===
In September 2025, Im released the single "Bubble" ahead of her upcoming seventh studio album.

=== 2025: Honorary Doctorate ===
In July 2025, Im was awarded an Honorary Doctorate (DUniv) by Griffith University for her distinguished service to the Arts. During the mid-year graduation ceremony, Im performed for the graduating cohort. Im credited the Queensland Conservatorium for shaping her as a performer and noted the significance of returning to the university where she had previously studied.

== Artistry ==
Im credits her home influences, with her mother being an opera singer, and her own training in piano, as providing her the grounding and work-ethic, instilling in her the love for music and performance. Im has also cited K-pop music as an inspiration in regard to her love and passion for singing and songwriting. Her musical influences are Beyoncé, Mariah Carey, Norah Jones, Corinne Bailey Rae and BoA.

Aside from singing Im is also known for her songwriting. Since parting with Sony Music, she has written and released her own songs with deeper personal meaning such as Marching On, Crying Underwater and Kiss You Anyway.

She is also recognised as a fashion trendsetter. During the X Factor competition, she was known for the extravagant outfits that she wore for her performances. Im was sought after by designers and fashion houses to showcase their creations, including Alannah Hill and Carla Zampatti. At Eurovision, Im's iconic dress was custom designed by well-known Australian designer Steven Khalil.

== Filmography ==
- 2014: Paper Planes

In 2014, Im was invited to perform a rendition of Macy Gray's "Beauty in the World" for part of the soundtrack of Paper Planes, an Australian children's movie. Paper Planes starred Sam Worthington, David Wenham, Deborah Mailman and Ed Oxenbould, and was co-written by Steve Worland and Robert Connolly. Connolly also directed the movie. The co-producers were Liz Kearney and Maggie Miles. The movie opened in cinemas on 15 January 2015. A version of "Beauty in the World" was also recorded for Im's Heart Beats album.

- 2016: Trolls

On 15 November 2016 multiple media sources announced that Im would be making her film debut in the Australian release of DreamWorks Animation's feature Trolls. She is cast as the voice to the role of Grandma Rosiepuff. Im would share the role with Susanna Reid, who will be the voice of the character for the UK version and GloZell Green who will be the voice for the US version. Media also reported that Im joined Justin Timberlake at the Australian premiere of the film on 20 November at Hoyts Entertainment Quarter in Moore Park, Sydney.

== Special appearances ==
=== Carols in the Domain ===
Soon after winning The X Factor in 2013, Im was invited to her first appearance at Carols in the Domain. An annual event that is broadcast live in Australia, the event consistently draws large crowds of in excess of 80,000. The event is often hosted by media personalities with a diverse cast that is made up of musicians, performers, characters from popular media, choral groups and choirs. Im's has participated in this annual event every year since her first show in 2013. On 21 November 2016 it was announced that Im would once again be a part of the cast for the 2016 event to be held and telecast live on 18 December 2016. The details of Im's performances at each year's shows are listed below:

Year	Date	Songs	Ref
2013	21 December 2013	"Silent Night"	
2013	21 December 2013	"Away in a Manger"	
2014	20 December 2014	"O Holy Night"	
2014	20 December 2014	"The Christmas Song"	
2015	19 December 2015	"O Come, All Ye Faithful"	
2015	19 December 2015	"Silent Night" (duet with Cyrus Villanueva)	
2015	19 December 2015	"Away in a Manger"	
2016	18 December 2016	"The First Noel"	
2016	18 December 2016	"O Holy Night"	
2017	17 December 2017	"O Come, All Ye Faithful"	

=== Carols by Candlelight ===
On Saturday, 24 December 2016, Im was among an ensemble cast of Australian performers who performed at the Vision Australia Carols By Candlelight at the Sidney Myer Music Bowl in Melbourne, Australia. The other performers include Anthony Callea, Tim Campbell, Kate Ceberano, Shane Jacobson, Lucy Durack, Marina Prior, Silvie Paladino, David Hobson, Denis Walter, Darren Percival, legally blind opera singer Michael Leonardi, and Ol'55, who celebrated their 40th anniversary at the event. The event was broadcast live nationally by the Nine Network. Media reports of the event acclaimed Im's performance, "Dami Im stole the show -hands down- last night."

Year	Date	Songs	Ref
2016	24 December 2016	"All I Want for Christmas Is You"	
2016	24 December 2016	"When a Child Is Born"	

== Personal life ==
Im met her husband Noah Kim, at her Korean church in Brisbane and in 15 September 2012 they were married in Seoul. The couple have a son who was born in 2022. Im and her husband lived in Daisy Hill, a suburb of Logan City in Queensland. In October 2013, she was named the cultural ambassador for Logan City and was offered the key to the city by mayor Pam Parker. Im was presented with the key at a ceremony on 4 December 2013.

Im is an avid foodie, and has a passion for sweets. During a Facebook Live interview with New Idea magazine in 2016, Im shared that she likes cooking and relaxing at home. She said her favourite food is her mother's home-cooked food, especially chijimi, a Korean pancake. In another interview she also intimated that her 'go-to' comfort food is Korean fried chicken.

== Compassion Australia ==
Im is an ardent supporter of Compassion Australia and one of their most active ambassadors. After Eurovision 2016, against the advice of many in the industry, Im went ahead with a pre-planned trip to visit her eighth sponsor child, Jovia, in Uganda. During the trip, Dami Im hosted a concert for the 200 children in Uganda and live broadcast on Facebook. She is passionate about drawing attention to the poverty of people around the world and the need to help support people in these circumstances. She said that her trip to Uganda was grounding to her and gives purpose for what she does in her life and work.

== Notable performances ==
Im has appeared in numerous public performances marking special occasions and on live TV including:

- 15 December 2015 – Dami Im, accompanied by the NSW Public Schools Singers performed a rendition of "I Am Australian" at a special ceremony held on 15 December 2015 to commemorate the first anniversary of the 2014 Sydney hostage crisis.
- 10 February 2016 – Dami Im performed on Beijing TV's Global Spring Festival Gala broadcast to celebrate the Spring Festival. Im performed a solo cover of "(They Long to Be) Close to You" and a duet with Chinese Kazakh singer, Tasiken, singing in Chinese the song, "365 Mile Road" (三百六十五里路) to a reported global audience of over 200 million.
- 21 April 2016 – Dami Im performed a tribute to Prince by singing "Purple Rain" on live television broadcast during Channel 7's The Morning Show after learning of his death.
- 12 May 2016 and 14 May 2016 – Im's performances of "Sound of Silence" at the Second Semi-final on 12 May and Grand Final on 14 May at the Eurovision Song Contest 2016 at Globe Arena in Stockholm, Sweden. Im won the Second Semi-final and advanced to the Grand Final as the first Australian entrant to ever do so at the event. She placed second at the Grand Final.
- 1 November 2016 – Im performed at the 2016 Melbourne Cup to a worldwide television audience estimated at over 700 million. Im was accompanied by the Royal Melbourne Philharmonic orchestra and choir. Im performed a cover of Celine Dion's "The Power of the Dream" as well as the Australian National Anthem.
- 7 December 2016 – At the 6th AACTA Awards Im performed a rendition of Nikolai Rimsky-Korsakov's "Flight of the Bumblebee" on a grand piano in front of a screen portraying scenes from Geoffrey Rush's Shine as a tribute to the iconic 1996 film. News reports described Im's performance as the one that "stole the show".
- 26 January 2017 – At the Australia Day Concert on the steps of the Sydney Opera House, that was broadcast live on television by Network Ten, Im reprised a solo performance of her Eurovision anthem "Sound of Silence". She teamed up with Guy Sebastian in a duet cover rendition of "Hold Me in Your Arms" which reportedly is the first time the two artists collaborated in a live performance. On 7 April 2017 Im recorded and released a studio single version of this song with Jack Jones (Irwin Thomas). It was reported on 9 April 2017, that [Im's] "performance was so powerful [that] Sony boss Denis Handlin commissioned the new version and spared no expense securing the original voice of the song Jack Jones (Irwin Thomas) to re-create the 1990 hit". Together with Human Nature, the duo joined Russell Morris to perform a group rendition of "The Real Thing". In the finale, Im joined the rest of the other concert performers in group renditions of the Australian National Anthem, "Advance Australia Fair", and "I Am Australian".
- 15 April 2018, Im performed "Alive" at the 2018 Commonwealth Games closing ceremony.
- 13–14 June 2019, Im performed her show 'My Life In Songs' at the Adelaide Cabaret Festival.
- 11–12 October 2019, Im performed in Korea at the Asia Song Festival alongside prominent KPop artists
- 8 February 2020, Im performed "Walk with Me" with Måns Zelmerlöw at Eurovision – Australia Decides.
- 8 March 2026, Im performed the national anthems of both South Korea and Australia at the 2026 AFC Women's Asian Cup Group Stage match between Korea Republic and The Matildas at Stadium Australia, Sydney. She also performed during the half-time break.
- 16 May 2026 Im was the Australian spokesperson at that year's Eurovision Song Contest, giving the 12 points to the eventual winner, Bulgaria's Dara and her song "Bangaranga".

== Discography ==
- Dream (2010)
- Dami Im (2013)
- Heart Beats (2014)
- Classic Carpenters (2016)
- I Hear a Song (2018)
- My Reality (2021)

== Concert tours ==
Headlining

- The X Factor Live Tour (2013)
- Yesterday Once More Tour (2016–2017)
- I Hear a Song Tour (2018)
- Dreamer Tour (2019)
- Paper Dragon Tour (2020)

Supporting

- Nova's Red Room Global Tour (Series 1: 2014)
- John Legend's All of Me Tour (2014): Australian leg

== Awards and nominations ==
=== ARIA No. 1 Chart Awards ===
The ARIA No. 1 Chart Awards were established in 2002 to recognise Australian recording artists, who reached number one on the ARIA albums, singles and music DVDs charts.

Year	Nominee / work	Award	Result	Ref.
2014	Dami Im	Number One Album	Won	
2014	"Alive"	Number One Single	Won	

=== Australian Club Entertainment Awards ===
The Australian Club Entertainment Awards are held annually to honour Australian music and variety acts.

Year	Nominee / work	Award	Result	Ref.
2017	Dami Im	Club Performer of the Year	Won	
2017	Dami Im	Female Vocalist of the Year	Won	

=== Australian Women in Music Awards ===
The Australian Women in Music Awards is an annual event that honours women for their contributions to the Australian music industry. They were first awarded in 2018.

Year	Nominee / work	Award	Result	Ref.
2019	Dami Im	Humanitarian award	Won	
2021	Dami Im	Songwriter Award	Nominated	

=== Channel V Awards ===
The Channel V Oz Artist of the Year was an annual award presented by Channel V Australia and is voted by the Australian public from 1997 to 2014.

Year	Nominee / work	Award	Result	Ref.
2014	Dami Im	Channel V Oz Artist of the Year	Nominated	

=== National Indigenous Music Awards ===
The National Indigenous Music Awards (NIMAs) recognise excellence, dedication, innovation and outstanding contribution to the Northern Territory music industry.

Year	Nominee / work	Award	Result	Ref.
2023	"Promised Land" Yirrmal featuring Dami Im	Song of the Year	Nominated	

=== POPrepublic.tv IT List Awards ===
POPreplublic.tv was an Australian online entertainment and lifestyle magazine. Nominees for their IT List Awards are selected by the magazine, and winners are decided by public vote.

Year	Nominee / work	Award	Result	Ref.
2013	Dami Im	Breakthrough Artist	Nominated	
2013	Dami Im	Favourite Album of 2013	Nominated	

=== Queensland Music Awards ===
The Queensland Music Awards (previously known as Q Song Awards) are annual awards celebrating Queensland, Australia's brightest emerging artists and established legends.

Year	Nominee / work	Award	Result (wins only)	Ref.
2017	Dami Im	Most Popular Female artist	Won	
2026	"Bubble"	Jazz Award	Won	

=== World Music Awards ===
The World Music Awards were presented to the world's best-selling artists in several categories and to the best-selling artists from each major territory. The awards ceased in 2014.

Year	Nominee / work	Award	Result	Ref.
2014	Dami Im	World's Best Female Artist	Nominated	
2014	Dami Im	World's Best Live Act	Nominated	
2014	Dami Im	World's Best Entertainer of the Year	Nominated	
2014	"Alive"	World's Best Song	Nominated	

Preceded by Justice Crew with "Boom Boom" and "Everybody"	Australia in the ABU TV Song Festival; 2014	Succeeded by incumbent
Preceded by Guy Sebastian with "Tonight Again"	Australia in the Eurovision Song Contest; 2016	Succeeded by Isaiah Firebrace with "Don't Come Easy"
