= Single Ladies (Put a Ring on It) =

2008 single by Beyoncé

Single by Beyoncé

from the album I Am... Sasha Fierce
- A-side: "If I Were a Boy" (double A-side)
- Released: October 8, 2008
- Recorded: May 2008
- Studio: The Boom Boom Room (Burbank, California)
- Genre: Dance-pop; R&B; bounce
- Length: 3:13
- Label: Columbia
- Composers: Beyoncé Knowles; Christopher "Tricky" Stewart; Terius "The-Dream" Nash
- Lyricists: Knowles; Stewart; Nash; Thaddis Harrell
- Producers: Knowles; Tricky Stewart; The-Dream

Beyoncé singles chronology
"Love in This Club Part II" (2008)	"If I Were a Boy" / "Single Ladies (Put a Ring on It)" (2008)	"At Last" (2008)

Music video
- "Single Ladies (Put a Ring on It)" on YouTube

"Single Ladies (Put a Ring on It)" is a song by American singer Beyoncé from her third studio album, I Am... Sasha Fierce (2008). Columbia Records released "Single Ladies" as a single on October 8, 2008, as a double A-side alongside "If I Were a Boy", showcasing the contrast between Beyoncé and her aggressive onstage alter ego Sasha Fierce. It explores men's unwillingness to propose or commit. In the song, the female protagonist is in a club to celebrate her single status.

"Single Ladies" won three Grammy Awards in 2010, including Song of the Year, among other accolades. Several news media sources named it as one of the best songs of 2008, while some considered it one of the best songs of the decade. Rolling Stone ranked it at number 228 on their list of the 500 greatest songs of all time in 2021. It topped the US Billboard Hot 100 chart for four non-consecutive weeks and received a 11× platinum certification by the Recording Industry Association of America (RIAA). The song charted among the top ten within the singles category in several other countries. Globally, it was 2009's seventh best-selling digital single with 6.1 million copies sold.

A black-and-white music video accompanied the single's release. It won several awards, including three at the 2009 MTV Video Music Awards winning the top prize Video of the Year. Beyoncé has performed "Single Ladies" on television and during her concert tours. The song and particularly its music video have been widely parodied and imitated. Several notable artists have performed cover versions. Media usage has included placement in popular television shows. In 2026, "Single Ladies" was selected by the Library of Congress for preservation in the National Recording Registry for its "cultural, historical or aesthetic importance in the nation's recorded sound heritage."

== Background and release ==
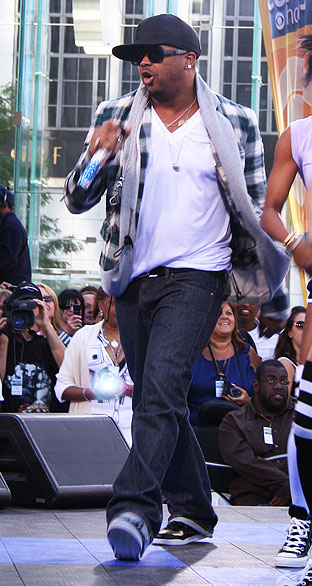
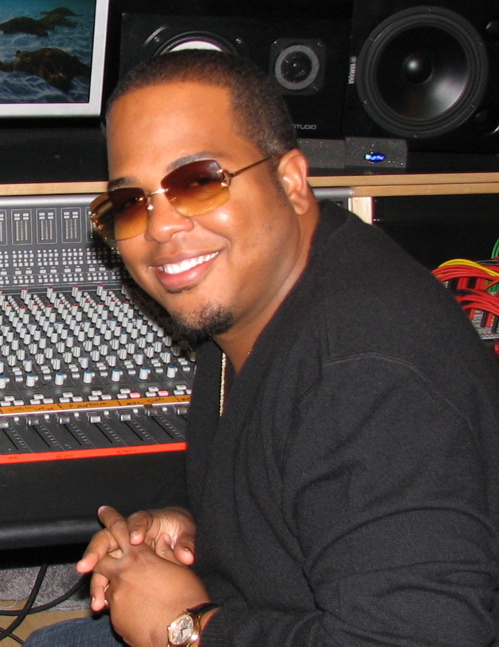
The-Dream (left) and Christopher Stewart (right) co-wrote and produced "Single Ladies".

"Single Ladies (Put a Ring on It)" was written by Beyoncé, Terius "The-Dream" Nash, Thaddis "Kuk" Harrell, and Christopher "Tricky" Stewart, and was produced by Nash and Stewart. Beyoncé recorded the song in May 2008 at the Boom Boom Room Studio in Burbank, California, and it was mixed by Jaycen Joshua and Dave Pensado, with assistance from Randy Urbanski and Andrew Wuepper. Nash conceptualized "Single Ladies" after Beyoncé's secret marriage to hip hop recording artist Jay-Z in April 2008. Stewart commented that the song was "the only public statement that [Beyoncé and Jay-Z had] ever made about marriage", and that while in the studio recording the song Beyoncé had remained tightlipped, even to the point of removing her wedding band. Beyoncé's marriage inspired Nash to compose a song about an issue that affected many people's relationships: the fear or unwillingness of men to commit. In an interview with Billboard magazine, Beyoncé added that she was drawn to the song because of the universality of the topic, an issue that "people are passionate about and want to talk about and debate". She stated that although "Single Ladies" is a playful uptempo song, it addresses an issue that women experience every day.

In "Single Ladies", Beyoncé portrays her alter ego Sasha Fierce, which appears on the second part of I Am... Sasha Fierce. The song was released simultaneously with "If I Were a Boy"; as lead singles, they were meant to demonstrate the concept of the dueling personalities of the singer. This reinforced the theme of the album, which was created by placing its ballads and uptempo tracks on separate discs. The singles debuted on US radio on October 8, 2008; "Single Ladies" did so on mainstream urban New York radio station Power 105.1. Both singles were added to rhythmic contemporary radio playlists on October 12, 2008; "Single Ladies" was sent to urban contemporary playlists the same day, while "If I Were a Boy" was instead classified for contemporary hit radio. The two songs were released as a double A-side single on November 7, 2008, in Australia, New Zealand, and Germany. Dance remixes of the song were made available in the US on February 10, 2009, and in Europe on February 16, 2009. "Single Ladies" was not originally released as a single in the UK, but the song became increasingly popular there and reached the top ten in the UK Singles Chart as a result of download sales. On February 16, 2009, it was released as a CD single, and the dance remixes became available as a digital download.

== Composition and lyrical interpretation ==
"Single Ladies (Put a Ring on It)"
A sample of "Single Ladies (Put a Ring on It)", a dance-pop and R&B number that uses hand claps, minor chords, spaced out synthesizers, robotic effects and an ascending whistling in the background

"Single Ladies" is an uptempo dance-pop, bounce, and R&B song with dancehall and disco influences. While the first measure is in 3/4, it is set in common time 4/4 except for a change to 3/4 for one measure before the final chorus. It makes use of staccato bounce-based hand claps, Morse code beeps, an ascending whistle in the background, and a punchy organic beat. The instrumentation includes a bass drum, a keyboard and spaced out synthesizers that occasionally zoom in and out; one commentator, Sarah Liss of CBC News, noted that their arrangement surprisingly comes as light, instead of dense. According to the sheet music published at Musicnotes.com by Sony/ATV Music Publishing, the verses of "Single Ladies" are played in the key of E major and the piece modulates to E Mixolydian for the chorus and E minor for the bridge and is played in a "moderate groove" tempo of 96.9 beats per minute. Beyoncé's vocals range from the note of F♯_{3} to D_{5}. It has a chord progression of E in the verses, and Bdim–C–Bdim–Am in the chorus. J. Freedom du Lac of The Washington Post noted the song features "playground vocals".

"Single Ladies" is musically similar to Beyoncé's 2007 single "Get Me Bodied"; Andy Kellman of AllMusic called it a "dire throwback" to the song. Stewart and Harrell said in an interview given to People magazine that the similar rhythm of the two songs is "what Beyoncé responds to". Ann Powers of the Los Angeles Times saw the song's theme of female empowerment as an extension of that of "Irreplaceable" (2006), and Daniel Brockman of The Phoenix noted that its usage of "blurry pronouns" such as "it" resembles Beyoncé's 2005 single "Check on It". Liss commented that the beat of the "Single Ladies" evokes African gumboot dancing and schoolyard Double Dutch chants, a view shared by Douglas Wolf of Time magazine. Trish Crawford of the Toronto Star concluded that "Single Ladies" is "a strong song of female empowerment", and other music critics have noted its appeal to Beyoncé's fan base of independent women as in the song, Beyoncé offers support to women who have split up from their no-good boyfriends.

In "Single Ladies", Beyoncé emphasizes her aggressive and sensual alter ego Sasha Fierce. She displays much attitude in her voice, as stated by Nick Levine of Digital Spy. Echoing Levine's sentiments, Liss wrote that Beyoncé sounds "gleefully sassy". The lyrics reflect post-breakup situations. Accompanied by robotic-like sounds, the opening lines of the song are call and response; Beyoncé chants, "All the single ladies", and background singers echo the line each time. In the first verse, Beyoncé narrates the recent end to a poor relationship after she "cried [her] tears for three good years". She reclaims her right to flirt, have fun, and find a lover who is more devoted than the previous one. Beyoncé goes out to celebrate with her friends in a club where she meets a new love interest. However, her former boyfriend is watching her, and she directs the song to him. She then sings the chorus, which uses minor chords and contains several hooks, "If you like it then you shoulda put a ring on it ... Oh oh oh".

In the second verse, Beyoncé tells her ex-lover that, as he did not attempt to make things more permanent when he had the chance, he has no reason to complain now that she has found someone else. On the bridge, she affirms that she wants her new love interest "to make like a prince and grab her, delivering her to 'a destiny, to infinity and beyond'" while "Prince Charming is left standing there like the second lead in a romantic comedy". Towards the end of the song, Beyoncé takes a more aggressive vocal approach and employs a middle eight as she sings, "And like a ghost I'll be gone". When she chants the chorus for the third and final time, her vocals are omnipresent within layers of music, as described by Frannie Kelley of NPR. An electronic swoop tugs in continuously until the song ends.

== Critical reception ==
=== Reviews ===
The song received universal critical acclaim. Nick Levine of Digital Spy particularly praised its beats, which according to him, "just don't quit". Michelangelo Matos of The A.V. Club wrote that the song is "fabulous, with glowing production, a humongous hook, and beats for weeks". Ann Powers of the Los Angeles Times was also impressed with the overall production of the song, specifically the chorus, adding "More than most female singers, Beyoncé understands the funky art of singing rhythmically, and this is a prime example." Fraser McAlpine of BBC Online considered "Single Ladies" to be the best song Beyoncé has attempted since "Ring the Alarm" (2006) and complimented the former's refrain, describing it as "so amazingly catchy that it provides a surprisingly solid foundation for the entire song". Alexis Petridis of The Guardian commended the threatening atmosphere that "Single Ladies" creates by using minor chords. Daniel Brockman of The Phoenix complimented the song's use of the word "it", and wrote that the technique "sums up her divided musical persona far more effectively than the [album's] two-disc split-personality gimmick."

Darryl Sterdan of Jam! called the song single-worthy, and wrote that it is "a tune that actually sounds like a Beyoncé number". Sarah Liss of CBC News wrote that "Single Ladies" represents Beyoncé at her best, describing it as "an instantly addictive [and] a bouncy featherweight dance-pop track". She further commented that it was pleasant to hear a voice which "changes timbre naturally, a voice with actual cracks and fissures (however slight)" in contrast to the "Auto-Tune epidemic that seems to be plaguing so many of her mainstream pop peers". Douglas Wolf of Time magazine added that "Single Ladies" is a sing-along which allows Beyoncé to demonstrate her virtuosity and "a focused, commanding display of individuality that speaks for every raised hand without a ring on it". Sasha Frere-Jones of The New Yorker wrote that the song combines a jumble of feelings and sounds that "don't resolve but also never become tiring". He concluded that "Single Ladies" was generally jubilant and that Beyoncé's vocals were pure and glimmering. Andy Kellman of AllMusic and Jessica Suarez of Paste magazine noted the song as one of the standouts from I Am... Sasha Fierce, and saw similarities to "Get Me Bodied".

Writers praised the song's dance beat; Colin McGuire of PopMatters praised "Single Ladies" as one of Beyoncé's best dance tracks. Spence D. of IGN Music described the song as a "Caribbean flair and booty shaking jubilation that should get even the most staid of listeners snapping their necks and gyrating joyfully". Joey Guerra of the Houston Chronicle wrote that it is a "hip-shaking club" song similar to "Check on It". Leah Greenblatt of Entertainment Weekly magazine wrote that "Single Ladies" is a "giddy, high-stepping hybrid of lyrical kiss-off and fizzy jump-rope jam". Describing the song as a "winning high-stepping" one, Adam Mazmanian of The Washington Times wrote that "Single Ladies" is designed to get the women out on the dance floor as Beyoncé sings it with "a genuinely defiant, independent voice". Some critics were unimpressed by "Single Ladies". Mariel Concepcion of Billboard magazine called it "standard screech-thump fare". The Observer's Adam Mattera saw "Single Ladies" and "Diva" as potential sources of inspiration for drag queens, although they may leave others confused. Sal Cinquemani of Slant Magazine criticized its lyrical inconsistencies, suggesting it is a "leftover" from B'Day.

=== Recognition ===
Rolling Stone named "Single Ladies" the best song of 2008, and wrote, "The beat ... is irresistible and exuberant, the vocal hook is stormy and virtuosic." "Single Ladies" ranked as the second-best song of the 2000s decade in the magazine's 2009 readers' poll, and Rolling Stone critics placed it at number 50 on the list of the 100 Best Songs of the Decade. In 2021, the same magazine placed the song at number 228 on its list of the 500 Greatest Songs of All Time."Single Ladies" was placed at number two on MTV News' list of The Best Songs of 2008; James Montgomery called it "hyperactive and supercharged in ways I never thought possible. It's epic and sexy and even a bit sad." "There is absolutely zero chance Beyoncé ever releases a single like this ever again", Montgomery concluded. Time magazine's critic Josh Tyrangiel, who called the song "ludicrously infectious", ranked it as the seventh-best song of 2008. Douglas Wolf of the same publication placed it at number nine on his list of the All-Time 100 Songs.

"Single Ladies" appeared at number six on the Eye Weekly's critics' list of the Best Singles of 2008, and at number six on About.com's Mark Edward Nero's list of the Best R&B Songs of 2008. On The Village Voice's year-end Pazz & Jop singles list, "Single Ladies" was ranked at numbers three and forty one in 2008 and 2009 respectively. Additionally, the Maurice Joshua Club Mix of the song was ranked at number 443 on the 2008 list. "Single Ladies" was named the best song of the 2000s decade by Black Entertainment Television (BET). Sarah Rodman, writing for The Boston Globe, named "Single Ladies" the fourth most irresistible song of the decade, and stated, "[Beyoncé] combined leotards with crass engagement-bling baiting into one delicious sexy-yet-antiquated package. The video had the whole world dancing and waving along via YouTube." VH1 ranked "Single Ladies" at number sixteen on its list of The 100 Greatest Songs of the 2000s. In his book Eating the Dinosaur (2009), Chuck Klosterman wrote that "Single Ladies" is "arguably the first song overtly marketed toward urban bachelorette parties". Jody Rosen of The New Yorker credited the melodies that float and dart over the thump for creating a new sound in music that didn't exist in the world before Beyoncé. He further wrote, "If they sound 'normal' now, it's because Beyoncé, and her many followers, have retrained our ears."

Organization	Country	Accolade	Year	Source
Rolling Stone	United States	Songs of the Decade (ranked 50)	2009	
Rolling Stone	United States	"Top Songs of 2008" (ranked 1)	2008	
Slant	United Kingdom	"The 100 Best Singles of the Aughts" (ranked 122)	2010	
Pitchfork	United States	"The 100 Best Tracks of 2008" (ranked 23)	2008	
Time	United States	All Time 100 Songs	2011	
Complex	United States	The 100 Best Songs of The Complex Decade	2012	
The Village Voice	United States	Pazz + Jop 2008 (ranked 3)	2008	

== Accolades ==
"Single Ladies" has received a number of awards and nominations, including the Song of the Year, Best R&B Song and Best Female R&B Vocal Performance at the 52nd Grammy Awards. It also won the awards for Favorite Song at the 2009 Kids' Choice Awards, Song of the Year at the 2009 Soul Train Music Awards, and Best R&B Song at the 2009 Teen Choice Awards. The American Society of Composers, Authors and Publishers (ASCAP) recognized "Single Ladies" as one of the most performed songs of 2009 at the 27th ASCAP Pop Music Awards. The song was nominated in the Best Song category at the 2009 NAACP Image Awards and in the English-language "Record of the Year" category at the 2009 Premios Oye! Awards. It was also nominated for Record of the Year at the 2009 Soul Train Music Awards, Viewer's Choice Award at the 2009 BET Awards, Best R&B/Urban Dance Track at the 2009 International Dance Music Awards, and World's Best Single at the 2010 World Music Awards.

Year	Organization	Award	Result
2009	BET Awards	Video of the Year	Won
2009	BET Awards	Viewers Choice Award	Nominated
2009	MOBO Awards	Best Video	Won
2009	MTV Europe Music Awards	Best Video	Won
2009	MTV Video Music Awards	Video of the Year	Won
2009	MTV Video Music Awards	Best Female Video	Nominated
2009	MTV Video Music Awards	Best Pop Video	Nominated
2009	MTV Video Music Awards	Best Editing in a Video	Won
2009	MTV Video Music Awards	Best Direction	Nominated
2009	MTV Video Music Awards	Best Special Effects	Nominated
2009	MTV Video Music Awards	Best Art Direction	Nominated
2009	MTV Video Music Awards	Best Cinematography in a Video	Nominated
2009	MTV Video Music Awards	Best Choreography in a Video	Won
2009	Kids' Choice Awards	Favorite Song	Won
2009	Soul Train Music Awards	Song of the Year	Won
2009	Soul Train Music Awards	The Ashford & Simpson Songwriter's Award	Nominated
2009	Teen Choice Awards	Choice R&B Track	Won
2009	TRL Awards	Nokia Playlist Generation Award	Won
2010	ASCAP Pop Music Awards	Most Performed Songs	Won
2010	ASCAP Rhythm & Soul Music Awards	Award Winning R&B/Hip-Hop Songs	Won
2010	Grammy Awards	Song of the Year	Won
2010	Grammy Awards	Best R&B Song	Won
2010	Grammy Awards	Best Female R&B Vocal Performance	Won

== Chart performance ==
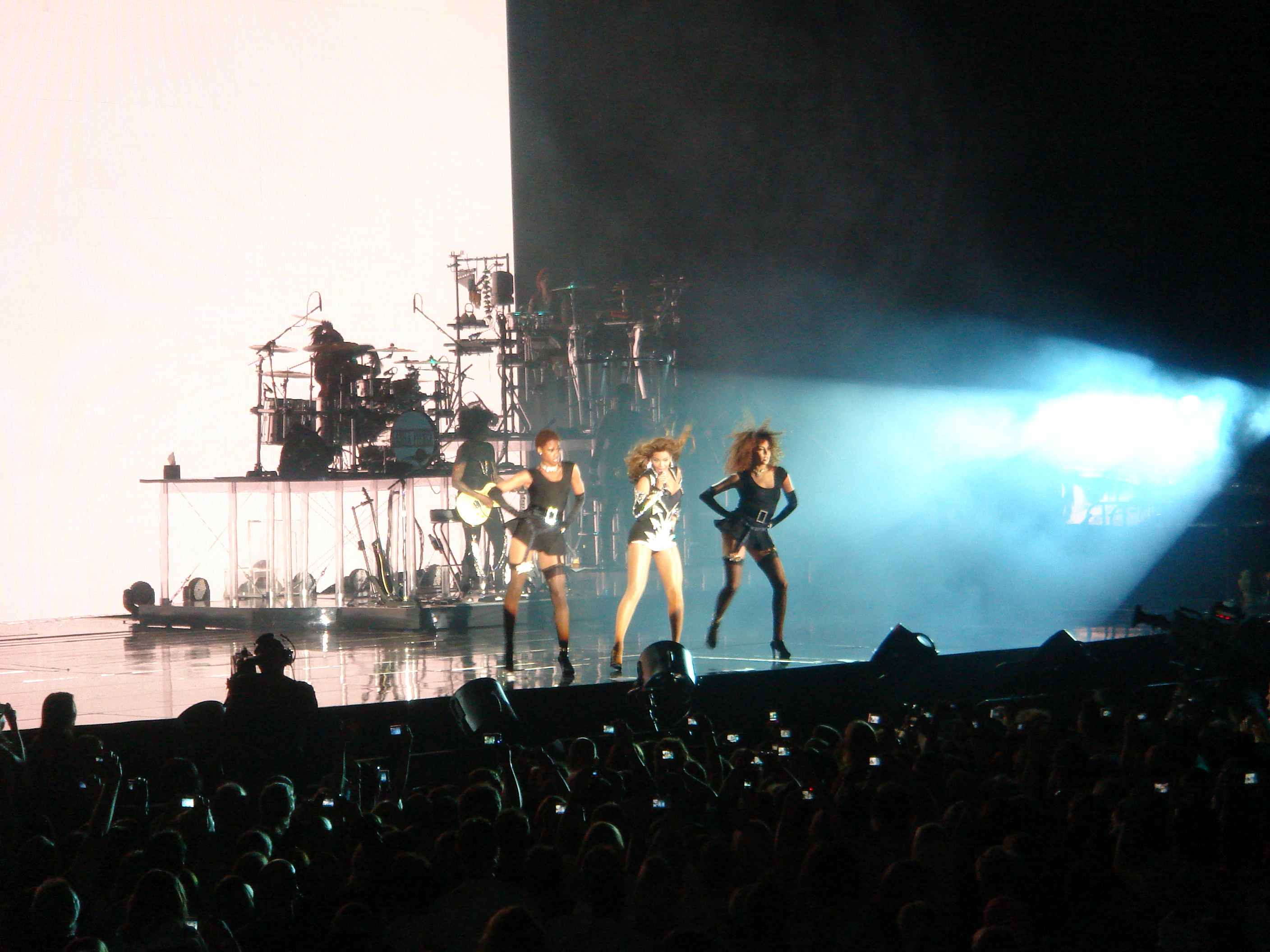
Beyoncé performing "Single Ladies" in Berlin on her I Am... World Tour, 2009

"Single Ladies" debuted at number 72 on the US Billboard Hot 100 chart issue dated November 1, 2008. On December 6, 2008, it moved from number 28 to number two on the Hot 100 chart, as a result of its debut at number one on the Hot Digital Songs chart, selling 204,000 digital downloads. The song became Beyoncé's fifth solo single to top the Hot Digital Songs chart. "If I Were a Boy" charted at number three on the Hot 100 chart the same week, and thus Beyoncé became the seventh female in the US to have two songs in the top five positions of that particular chart. The following week "Single Ladies" climbed to number one on the Hot 100 chart, selling 228,000 downloads, and became Beyoncé's fifth solo single to top the chart. It tied her with Olivia Newton-John and Barbra Streisand at number six on the list of female artists with the most Hot 100 number one hits, as of 2010.

The song was at the top of the chart for four non-consecutive weeks, during the last of which digital downloads of "Single Ladies" increased by 157 percent to 382,000 units—its best week of digital sales. For the week ending January 15, 2009, the song moved to number one on the Hot 100 Airplay chart with 147.3 million listener impressions. It reached number one on the Hot R&B/Hip-Hop Songs chart, where it remained for 12 consecutive weeks. "Single Ladies" topped the Pop Songs and the Hot Dance Club Play charts, and reached number two on the Pop 100 chart. The song was certified quadruple-platinum by the Recording Industry Association of America (RIAA) for sales of over 4,000,000 copies in 2010. It passed the 5 million sales mark in October 2012. In December 2024, RIAA updated Beyoncé's sales, certifying "Single Ladies" as having sold more than 11 million copies.

"Single Ladies" debuted at number 81 on the Canadian Hot 100 chart for the week ending November 29, 2008. On January 24, 2009, its ninth charting week, it moved to its peak spot at number two, and was subsequently certified double-platinum by the Canadian Recording Industry Association (CRIA) for sales of over 160,000 copies. The song peaked at number seven, and spent 112 weeks on the UK Singles Chart. It topped the UK R&B Chart, where it succeeded the song's double A-side, "If I Were a Boy". On November 21, 2025, "Single Ladies" was certified triple-platinum by the British Phonographic Industry (BPI) for sales of over 1,800,000 copies. As of November 2013, it has sold 704,000 copies in the UK. On the Irish Singles Chart, it reached number four and enjoyed 20 weeks of charting, while on the Japan Hot 100 chart it made its way to number 25. In Australia, the single attained a high point of number five on the ARIA Singles Chart, and received a nine-times platinum certification from the Australian Recording Industry Association (ARIA) for sales of over 630,000 copies. It peaked at number two on the New Zealand Singles Chart, and was certified platinum by the Recording Industry Association of New Zealand (RIANZ) for shipment of over 15,000 copies. Elsewhere, "Single Ladies" made more moderate success but appeared on several charts in mainland Europe, and peaked at number 20 on the European Hot 100 Singles chart. It reached the top 10 in Germany, the Netherlands, Italy and Spain, and the top 40 in both Belgian territories (Flanders and Wallonia), as well as in Hungary, Norway, Sweden and Switzerland. "Single Ladies" was 2009's seventh best-selling digital single with 6.1 million units sold worldwide.

== Music video ==
=== Background and concept ===
The music video for "Single Ladies" was shot immediately after "If I Were a Boy", but it received less attention during production than the "higher-gloss, higher-profile video" for "If I Were a Boy". Both videos were shot in black-and-white in New York City and were directed by Jake Nava, with whom Beyoncé had worked on previous music videos including "Crazy in Love" and "Beautiful Liar". "Single Ladies" was choreographed by Frank Gatson Jr. and JaQuel Knight, and incorporates J-Setting choreography. The two music videos premiered on MTV's Total Request Live show on October 13, 2008 to reinforce the concept of conflicting personalities. The videos were released to other media outlets on the same date and subsequently included on Beyoncé's remix album with videography, Above and Beyoncé, and the platinum edition of I Am... Sasha Fierce.

The music video, which incorporates J-Setting choreography, was inspired by the Bob Fosse-choreographed performance by Gwen Verdon in "Mexican Breakfast".

Beyoncé told Simon Vozick-Levinson of Entertainment Weekly that the inspiration for the video was a 1969 Bob Fosse routine entitled "Mexican Breakfast" seen on The Ed Sullivan Show, which featured Fosse's wife, Gwen Verdon, dancing with two other women. "Mexican Breakfast" had become an Internet viral sensation the previous summer after Unk's "Walk It Out" was dubbed over the original mix. Beyoncé wanted to attempt a similar dance and eventually, the choreography of "Single Ladies" was liberally adapted from "Mexican Breakfast":

I saw a video on YouTube. [The dancers] had a plain background and it was shot on the crane; it was 360 degrees, they could move around. And I said, 'This is genius.' We kept a lot of the Fosse choreography and added the down-south thing—it's called J-Setting, where one person does something and the next person follows. So it was a strange mixture ... It's like the most urban choreography, mixed with Fosse—very modern and very vintage.

Beyoncé wanted a simple music video; it was filmed with minimal alternative camera shots and cuts, and no changes to hairstyles, costumes and sets. According to JaQuel Knight, Beyoncé also wanted the video to feel "good and powerful" and include choreography that could be attempted by anybody. The day the video was shot, the song was divided into three parts. Nava deliberately used lengthy shots so that viewers "would connect with the human endeavor of Beyoncé's awe-inspiring dance", with all the changes in looks, angles, and lighting executed live on-camera because he wanted to keep the feel "very organic and un-gimmicky". The styling was inspired by a Vogue photo shoot. In the video Beyoncé wears a titanium roboglove designed by her long-time jeweler, Lorraine Schwartz, to complement her alter ego Sasha Fierce. The glove consists of several pieces, including a ring and a separate component that covers Beyoncé's upper arm. She first wore the roboglove on the red carpet at the MTV Europe Music Awards on November 8, 2008. The video shoot took around twelve hours. Many performances of the song were filmed without interruption, and edited together to give the impression that the final video was filmed in a single take.

=== Synopsis ===
In the video for "Single Ladies", emphasis is laid on Beyoncé's more aggressive and sensual side, her alter ego Sasha Fierce. It shows her in an asymmetrical leotard and high-heels, with two backup dancers, Ebony Williams and Ashley Everett. Beyoncé's mother, Tina Knowles, designed the high-cut leotards after seeing something similar in the American musical films A Chorus Line and All That Jazz. The dance routine incorporates many styles, including jazz, tap, and hip hop, and is credited with popularizing J-Setting, a flamboyant lead and follow dance style prominent in many African American gay clubs across Atlanta and used by the all-female Prancing J-Settes dance troupe of Jackson State University.

The video features Beyoncé and her two companions dancing inside an infinity cove, which alternates between black and white and places the focus on the complex choreography. Throughout the video the women click their heels and shake their hips and legs. However, the main intention is to attract the viewers' attention toward their hands and ring fingers as they do the hand-twirl move. At one point during the video, the dancers run up to a wall, which, according to Frank Gatson Jr., pays homage to Shirley MacLaine's act in the 1969 film Sweet Charity. Toward the end of the video, Beyoncé flashes her own wedding ring on her finger.

=== Response and accolades ===
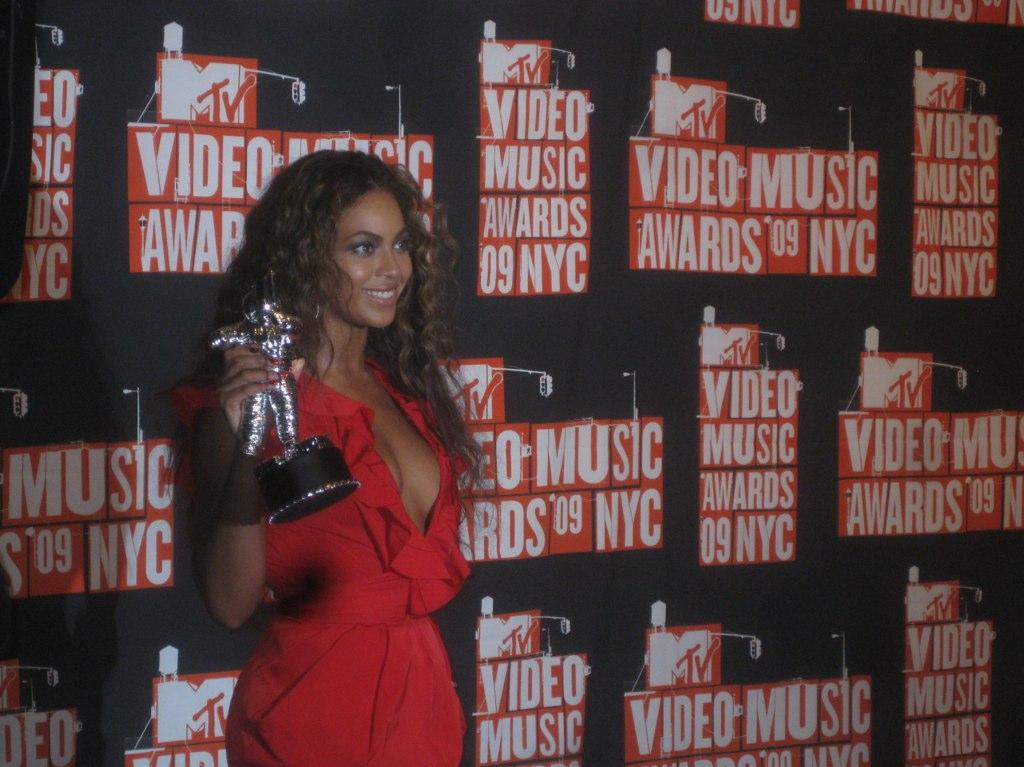
Beyoncé at the 2009 MTV Video Music Awards

Although the video for "Single Ladies" was the cheapest and quickest of all her videos to produce, Beyoncé felt that it ended up being "the most iconic ... something special". It spawned a dance craze and inspired thousands of imitations all over the world, many of which were posted on YouTube. In an interview with MTV, Beyoncé expressed her appreciation of the public's response to the video, and stated that she had spent much time watching several of these parodies: "It's beautiful to feel you touch people and bring a song to life with a video." Nava also expressed his surprise at the positive reception of the video, and attributed its success to the video's understated, less-is-more approach. In an interview with Chandler Levack for Eye Weekly, Toronto director Scott Cudmore stated that the Internet age has impacted the way music videos are made, as well as perceived by an audience. Although Cudmore believes that the music video as a medium is "disappearing ... from the mainstream public eye", he accredited "Single Ladies" with its resurgence, and stated that after the video appeared on the Internet, people began to "consciously look for music videos because of its art".

The music video has won several awards and accolades. It was voted Best Dance Routine in the 2008 Popjustice Readers' Poll; and won Video of the Year becoming the first black and white music video since Don Henley's The Boys of Summer, Best Choreography, and Best Editing at the 2009 MTV Video Music Awards. The song also won Best Video at the 2009 MTV Europe Music Awards, the 2009 MOBO Awards, and the 2009 BET Awards. The video has also received many nominations: Best Video in the 2009 Popjustice Readers Polls (placed 4th); nine (including the three that it won) in the 2009 MTV Video Music Awards; Best International Artist Video at the 2009 MuchMusic Video Awards (losing to Lady Gaga's "Poker Face"); Outstanding Music Video at the 2009 NAACP Image Awards; and two at the 2009 MTV Australia Awards for Best Video and Best Moves. The video was ranked at number four on BET's Notarized: Top 100 Videos of 2008 countdown, and at number three on VH1's Top 40 Videos of 2009. The video was voted Best Music Video of the Decade by MUZU.TV It was voted fifth-best music video of the 2000s by readers of Billboard magazine. Claire Suddath of Time magazine included it in her 30 All-Time Best Music Videos, writing that "sometimes the best creations are also the simplest". In 2013, John Boone and Jennifer Cady of E! Online placed the video at number one on their list of Beyoncé's ten best music videos writing, "[It has] All of the sex appeal. Ever... Beyoncé doesn't need anything but an empty room in this one. It's all about the dancing. It's all about the leotard. It's all about the fierceness. And it's epic." The music video was certified platinum by CRIA for shipment of sales 10,000 units. In 2021, Rolling Stone named "Single Ladies" the 12th greatest music video of all time, while Slant Magazine named it the 36th.

==== 2009 MTV Video Music Awards incident ====
"Single Ladies" was nominated for nine awards at the 2009 MTV Video Music Awards, ultimately winning three including Video of the Year. It lost the Best Female Video category to American country pop singer Taylor Swift's "You Belong with Me". Swift's acceptance speech was interrupted by rapper Kanye West, who climbed onto the stage, grabbed her microphone to declare the "Single Ladies" video as "one of the best videos of all time", shrugged, and left the stage. Footage of Beyoncé in the audience looking shocked was then shown. When Beyoncé won the Video of the Year award later that night, she reminisced about when she won her first MTV award with her former group, Destiny's Child, and called the experience "one of the most exciting moments in [her] life". She then invited Swift on-stage to finish her speech and "have her moment".

== Live performances ==
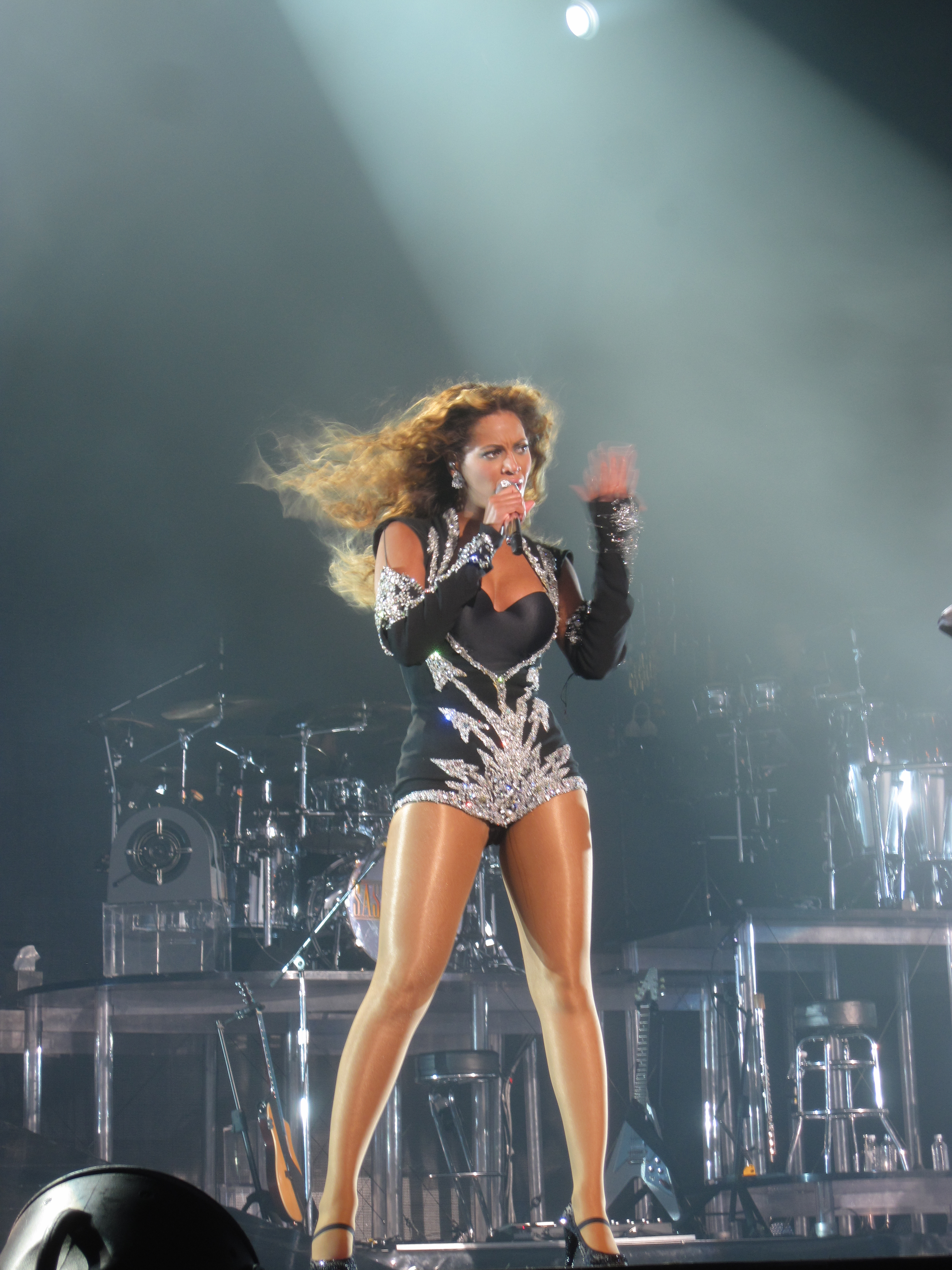
Beyoncé performing "Single Ladies" on her I Am... World Tour

Beyoncé first promoted "Single Ladies" in a concert organized by Power 105.1 radio in New York on October 29, 2008, and subsequently performed the song at various awards ceremonies, concerts and television shows, including Saturday Night Live (SNL) on November 15, 2008. That night, Beyoncé was featured in a parody of the song's music video, where the two female backup dancers from the video were replaced by pop singer Justin Timberlake and SNL cast members Andy Samberg and Bobby Moynihan. On November 16, 2008, Beyoncé performed a medley of "If I Were a Boy", "Single Ladies", and "Crazy in Love" during the final episode of Total Request Live. "Single Ladies" was also performed by Beyoncé on November 18, 2008, on 106 & Park, on November 25, 2008, on The Ellen DeGeneres Show and on November 26, 2008, at Rockefeller Plaza on The Today Show. She delivered a performance of "Single Ladies" with two male dancers on The Tyra Banks Show on January 9, 2009.

In July 2009, Beyoncé gave a concert at the Staples Center in Los Angeles where American actor Tom Cruise danced with her and her dancers as they performed the dance routine of "Single Ladies". At the MTV Video Music Awards on September 13, 2009, Beyoncé performed "Single Ladies" backed by "an army of single ladies" on stage. In a poll conducted by Billboard magazine, the performance was ranked as the seventh best in the history of MTV Video Music Awards. A critic wrote in the magazine: "The world gave a collective 'whoa' when Beyonce unleashed her 'Single Ladies' video, but to see those dance moves come to life at the 2009 VMAs was beyond eye-popping." Erika Ramirez of the same publication placed the performance at number two on her list of Beyoncé's five biggest TV performances. "Single Ladies" was included on the set lists of Beyoncé's I Am... Yours concerts and her I Am... World Tour. The song was subsequently included on Beyoncé's live albums I Am... Yours: An Intimate Performance at Wynn Las Vegas (2009) and I Am... World Tour (2010).

"Single Ladies" was later performed by Beyoncé in a pink fringe dress at a concert at Palais Nikaïa in Nice, France, on June 20, 2011, and at her historic headlining Glastonbury Festival Performance on June 26, 2011. On July 1, 2011, Beyoncé gave a free concert on Good Morning America as part of its Summer Concert Series, which included "Single Ladies". Backed by her all-female band and her backing singers The Mamas, Beyoncé performed "Single Ladies" in front of 3,500 people during the 4 Intimate Nights with Beyoncé revue at the Roseland Ballroom in New York, in August 2011. In May 2012, Beyoncé performed the song during her Revel Presents: Beyoncé Live revue at Revel Atlantic City, a hotel. Ben Ratliff of The New York Times mentioned "Single Ladies" in the "almost continuous high point" of the concert. Rebecca Thomas of MTV News wrote that Beyoncé's dancing during "Single Ladies" reflected the female empowerment theme of the song. On February 3, 2013, Beyoncé performed the song along with her former bandmates from Destiny's Child during the Super Bowl XLVII halftime show. The song was added to the set list of her Mrs. Carter Show World Tour (2013). Beyoncé's performed "Single Ladies" at The Sound of Change Live concert on June 1, 2013, at Twickenham Stadium, London as part of the Chime for Change movement. Starting May 1, 2025, Beyoncé performed "Single Ladies" on the Cowboy Carter Tour.

== Cultural impact ==
"Single Ladies" gained widespread popularity for its catchy hook and theme of female empowerment; it was described as a feminist anthem for unmarried women. Critics have compared the song to Aretha Franklin's "Respect" and Gloria Gaynor's "I Will Survive", prompted by their lyrics, which all promote female empowerment. The music video achieved fame for its intricate choreography and its deployment of jazz hands with a wrist twist. It has been credited with starting the "first major dance craze of both the new millennium and the Internet", triggering a number of parodies of the dance choreography. Billy Johnson of Yahoo! Music wrote that the video of "Single Ladies" was the top music-related viral hit of 2009. MTV News' James Montgomery wrote that "it appears like [the music video] was custom-made for the YouTube generation, which probably explains why making homages became a worldwide phenomenon." The video generated interest in J-Setting, the dance form that choreographer JaQuel Knight highlights in the video, and Beyoncé is credited with bringing the dance style to the mainstream.

In a radio interview on NPR's All Things Considered, Knight shared his excitement that the popular video made people want to learn to dance. Trish Crawford from the Toronto Star observed how it has appealed to all age groups and genders, in contrast with the short-lived dance craze inspired by Soulja Boy two years before, which she considered "mainly a male hip-hop dance". Crawford mentioned, "Toddlers have tackled [the 'Single Ladies' dance]. [So have] recreation centre dance classes, sorority sisters in their dorm rooms, suburban teenagers in their basements and high school cheerleaders." In February 2009, Columbia Records announced the launch of a "Single Ladies" Dance Video Contest. Fans aged eighteen and older were invited to adhere precisely to the dance routine performed by Beyoncé and her two dancers in the original production. The winning video was included in her live album, I Am... World Tour. In 2026, the song was selected, alongside other works, for inclusion in the Library of Congress National Recording Registry.

=== Parodies and homages ===
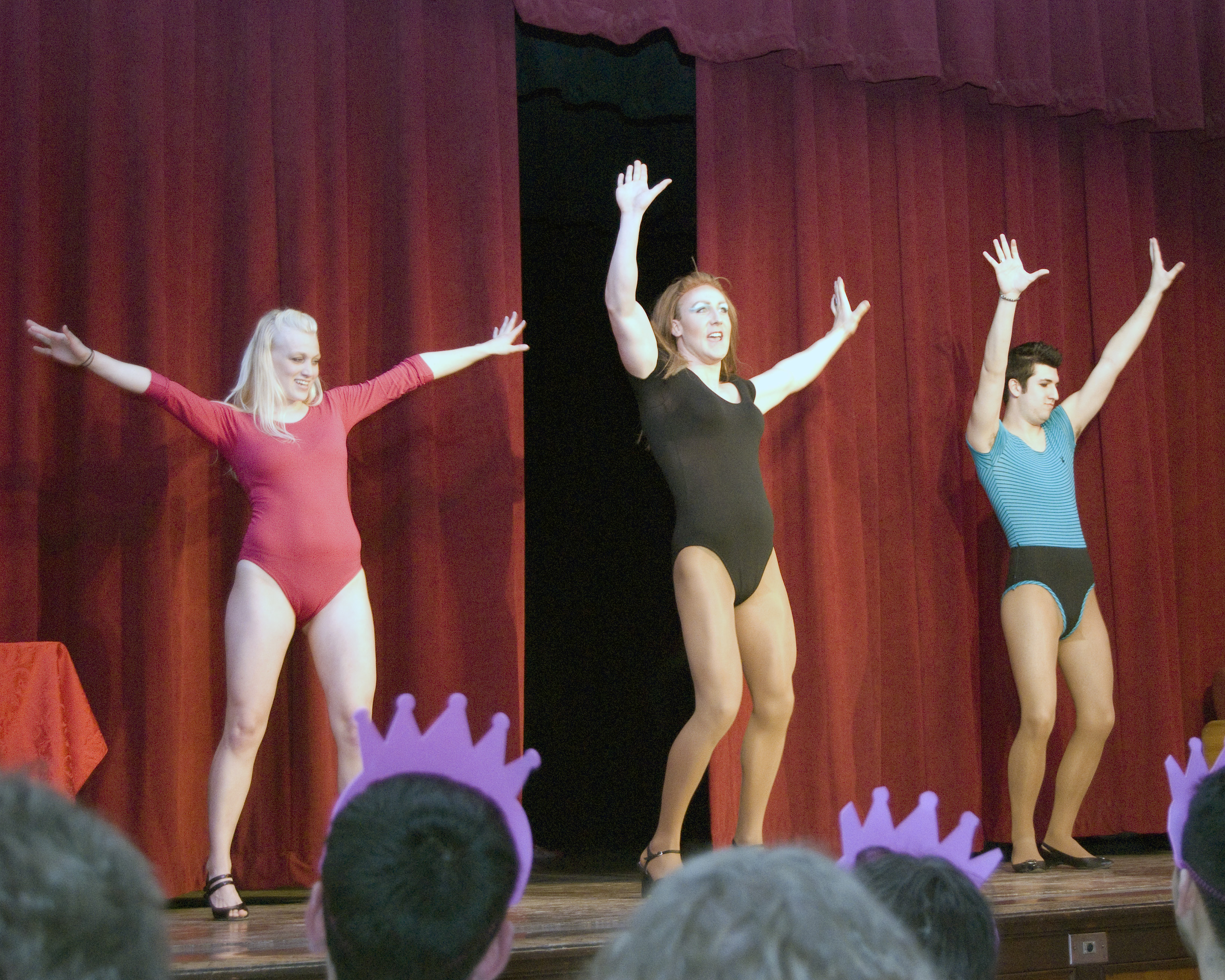
A drag showdance inspired by the "Single Ladies" music video

"Single Ladies" was first parodied in the November 15, 2008, episode of SNL, which featured Beyoncé. She was initially reluctant to participate in the segment but agreed to after a visit from Timberlake in her dressing room. Beyoncé's choreographer, Frank Gatson Jr., expressed mixed emotions at the result, saying: "I was upset because I know that Justin's a great dancer and if he learned the choreography, he could do it really well... If they're making parodies [of our work] just like they make parodies of politicians and presidents, that means it must be big time. So in that respect, I have to take my hat off to them for doing it." Later, Joe Jonas of the pop rock band Jonas Brothers posted a video on their YouTube account where he imitated the dance in a black leotard and heels. In London, one hundred dancers wearing leotards similar to the one worn by Beyoncé performed the choreography on April 20, 2009, to promote Trident Unwrapped gum.

The music video inspired a legion of amateur imitators to post videos of themselves performing the choreography on YouTube. One of the most viewed viral videos is that of Shane Mercado, who appeared on The Bonnie Hunt Show in bikini bottoms to perform the choreography. His subsequent meeting with Beyoncé became a media event. Beyoncé has acknowledged the popularity of the videos on YouTube; during her concert tour, excerpts from many of the YouTube videos were played in the background while Beyoncé was performing the song. Cubby, who is an on-air personality for Charlotte, North Carolina's 96.1 The Beat AM, based his parody on the SNL one. His video lead to a meet and greet with Beyoncé and eventually, an opportunity to join her on stage at a show stop in Atlanta during her I Am... World Tour. Many videos featuring babies of different ages, imitating the dance choreography of "Single Ladies", have been uploaded on YouTube. A video showing Cory Elliott, a baby boy from New Zealand, performing the dance while watching Beyoncé on television, gained significant coverage from several media outlets. Time magazine's critic Dan Fletcher ranked it as the fourth best viral video of 2009 and wrote, "Young children love songs with good rhythm and repetition, and 'Single Ladies' certainly has both." However, when a video of seven-year-old girls performing choreography from "Single Ladies" at a dance competition in Los Angeles went viral on YouTube, it created a controversy and sparked outrage from many viewers, who felt the girls were sexualized by the suggestive dance moves.

In a video filmed by singer John Legend, US President Barack Obama appears with his wife Michelle performing part of the "Single Ladies" routine. He also briefly performed the hand-twirl move from the song's video at the Obama Inaugural Celebration. This video prompted an Obama look-alike, Iman Crosson, to do his own version of the "Single Ladies" choreography. Several other well-known personalities, including American environmentalist and politician Joe Nation and American actor Tom Hanks, have performed the dance. In the music video for "Dancin on Me" by DJ Webstar and Jim Jones, three females are featured in the background, imitating the "Single Ladies" dance. Jenna Ushkowitz, Chris Colfer and Heather Morris did the "Single Ladies" dance as part of the Glee Live tour in June 2011. The music minister at Geyer Springs First Baptist Church in Little Rock, Arkansas, thought it would be "an excellent idea" to attract interest in the church choir by using a remix of "Single Ladies" and having choir members dance to it. In the music video he made, the choir members sing, "All the singing ladies, all the singing fellas ... If you like the choir, then won't you come and sing in it." Cyndi Wilkerson, Music Ministry Assistant at Geyer Springs First Baptist Church, uploaded the video to YouTube on August 29, 2011. In April 2013, YouTube phenomenon Psy did the dance routine during a concert in Seoul while wearing a red leotard and red boots. A television advert for the South African cellular service Vodacom, used the song as a backdrop to an actor who was humorously mimicking Beyoncé's dancing, the advert quickly went viral and spawned several different variations.

=== Usage in media ===
"Single Ladies" has been used in various media including television shows, commercials and books. In the Best of 2009 issue of People magazine, Khloe, Kim, and Kourtney Kardashian were ranked at number nine on the magazine's list of "25 Most Intriguing People"; the photograph accompanying the article showed the three women in leotards mimicking the look from the "Single Ladies" video. The song has been included in many television shows, including CSI: Miami, Cougar Town, and in two episodes in Glee. In the United Kingdom, the video for "Single Ladies" was used for a 2009 television commercial for the new Doner kebab flavored Pot Noodle. In other media, issue 33 of comic book series The Brave and the Bold features a scene in which Wonder Woman, Zatanna, and Barbara Gordon sing a karaoke version of the song while at a club. A mash-up video of the theme of "Single Ladies" and The Andy Griffith Show circulated on the Internet in early 2010. It was produced by Party Ben at the end of 2008. In July 2010, the line "Put a Ring on It" was used by the Joint United Nations Programme on HIV/AIDS as the tagline for a female condom public awareness campaign in the US. The song appeared in Alvin and the Chipmunks: The Squeakquel a year after the song was released as it was sung by the Chipettes. It also appeared in the Marvel Studios film Doctor Strange and the 2016 rhythm game Just Dance 2017.

=== Cover and remix versions ===
Singers and bands of various genres have covered the song in their own style. British band Marmaduke Duke performed a cover version in April 2009 on BBC Radio 1's Live Lounge show. In October 2009, it was released on Radio 1's Live Lounge – Volume 4, a compilation of Live Lounge recordings. Australian singer Stan Walker sang a jazzier version of the song on the seventh series of Australian Idol in October 2009. The same year, elementary school group PS22 chorus covered "Single Ladies" and "Halo" (2009) during Billboard's annual Women In Music luncheon held at The Pierre in New York City. In her short-lived Broadway revue "All About Me" in March 2010, Dame Edna Everage performed a version of the song with backup dancers Gregory Butler and Jon-Paul Mateo. It was also covered by Jeff Tweedy and British singer-songwriter Alan Pownall. According to Simon Vozick-Levinson of Entertainment Weekly, Tweedy sang only a few bars; he gave "Single Ladies" an acoustic feel and recited the rest of the song's lyrics. He performed the hand movements that Beyoncé and her dancers do in the song's video. Pomplamoose, an American indie music duo consisting of Jack Conte and Nataly Dawn, recorded a cover of "Single Ladies" on video, which makes use of split screens to show Dawn on vocals and Conte playing the instruments. Inspired by the avant-garde Dogme 95 movement in cinema, Conte began to record songs on video as a quick way to create "organic and raw" music. They chose "Single Ladies" as they believed that it would help them grow their audience.

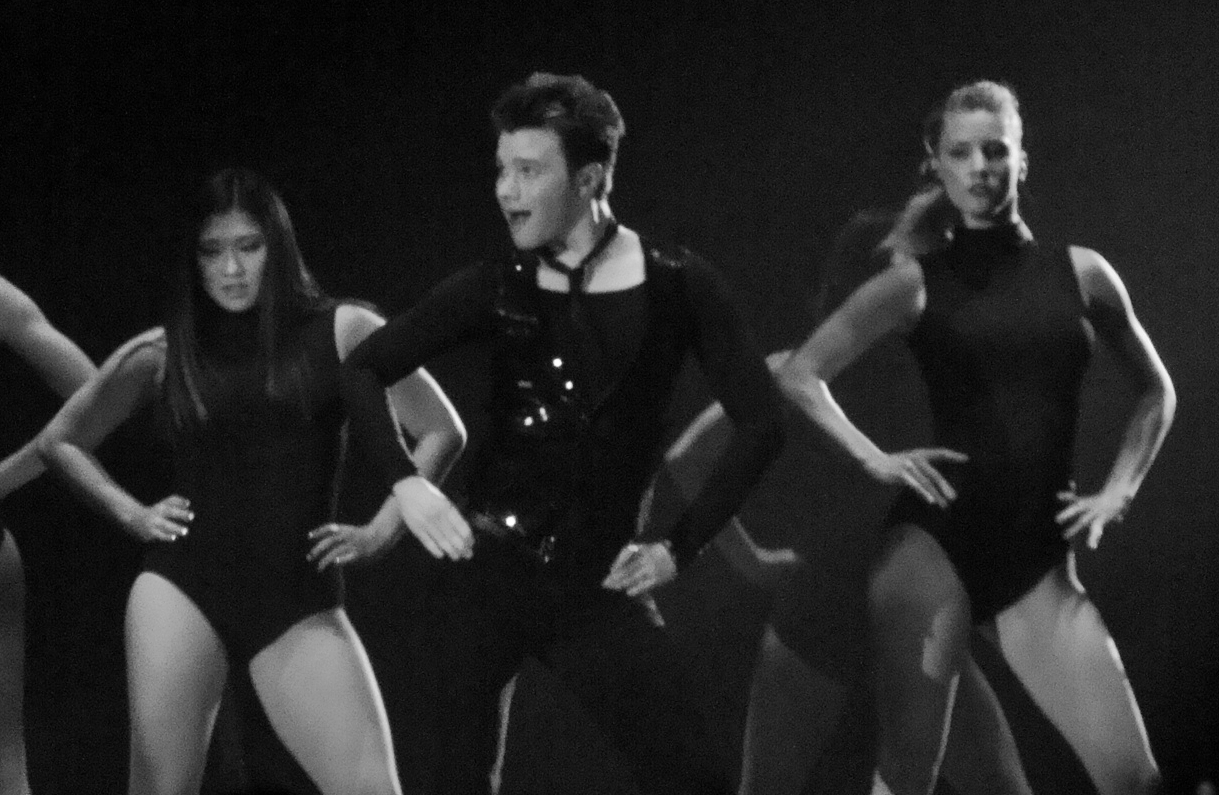
Jenna Ushkowitz, Chris Colfer and Heather Morris during a performance of "Single Ladies" on the tour Glee Live! In Concert! in 2011

During a concert at New York's Madison Square Garden, Prince performed a mash-up of his 1984 songs "Pop Life" and "I Would Die 4 U", incorporating a sample of "Single Ladies". During her tour in Melbourne, Australia, on August 13, 2010, Katy Perry performed "Single Ladies" and attempted to emulate the choreography. British composer of classical music Mark-Anthony Turnage composed a setting of the song which he titled "Hammered Out". Describing it as his "most R&B work to date", Turnage told Tim Rutherford-Johnson of The Guardian that he was motivated to put the "Single Ladies" reference in his work by his young son, a fan of the song. The piece premiered at the BBC Proms on August 27, 2010. Sara Bareilles covered the song as part of Billboard's "Mashup Mondays" and performed it as part of her set list on the 2010 Lilith Fair Tour. As stated by a critic writing for the magazine, Bareilles put "a piano-pop" twist on "Single Ladies" and turned it "into a slow, jazzy track, complete with creeping bassline and vocal harmonies". American rock band A Rocket to the Moon covered "Single Ladies" and placed it on their EP, The Rainy Day Sessions, which was released in October 2010.

On September 26, 2010, Kharizma sang their version of the song on the second series of The X Factor Australia, and on May 31, 2011, Matthew Raymond-Barker sang the song live on the seventh prime of the second series of the X Factor France. During the finale of the tenth season of American Idol on May 25, 2011, the lady contestants joined onstage to perform "Single Ladies" and attempted the dance moves from the song's video. The film Sex and the City 2 features a performance of the song by American singer and actress Liza Minnelli. On October 18, 2011, Young Men Society sang "Single Ladies" on the third series of The X Factor Australia, and on June 30, 2014, Holly Tapp sang the song on the third series of The Voice Australia.

In 2008, female rapper Nicki Minaj released an unofficial remix of "Single Ladies" with two rap verses.

== Formats and track listings ==
- Australia, Germany and New Zealand CD single and download
1. "If I Were a Boy" – 4:08
2. "Single Ladies (Put a Ring on It)" – 3:13
- US dance remixes
1. "Single Ladies (Put a Ring on It)" (Dave Audé Club Remix) – 8:20
2. "Single Ladies (Put a Ring on It)" (Karmatronic Club Remix) – 5:54
3. "Single Ladies (Put a Ring on It)" (RedTop Club Remix) – 6:52
4. "Single Ladies (Put a Ring on It)" (DJ Escape & Tony Coluccio Club Remix) – 6:54
5. "Single Ladies (Put a Ring on It)" (Lost Daze Dating Service Club Remix) – 6:47
6. "Single Ladies (Put a Ring on It)" (Craig C's Master Blaster Club Remix) – 8:19
- UK CD single
1. "Single Ladies (Put a Ring on It)" – 3:13
2. "Single Ladies (Put a Ring on It)" (RedTop Remix Radio Edit) – 3:33
- UK and Europe remixes download
1. "Single Ladies (Put a Ring on It)" (Redtop Remix – Dance Remix) – 3:33
2. "Single Ladies (Put a Ring on It)" (My Digital Enemy Remix) – 6:38
3. "Single Ladies (Put a Ring on It)" (Olli Collins & Fred Portelli Remix) – 7:40
4. "Single Ladies (Put a Ring on It)" (Dave Audé Remix Club Version) – 8:20
5. "Single Ladies (Put a Ring on It)" (The Japanese Popstars Remix) – 7:46
6. "Single Ladies (Put a Ring on It)" – 3:13

== Credits and personnel ==
Credits adapted from I Am... Sasha Fierce album liner notes.

- Jim Caruana – vocal tracks recorded by
- Thaddis "Kuk" Harrell – music recorded by, songwriter
- Jaycen Joshua – audio mixer
- Beyoncé – vocals performed by, vocal producer, music producer, songwriter
- Dave Pensado – audio mixer
- Terius "The-Dream" Nash – music producer, songwriter
- Christopher "Tricky" Stewart –music producer, songwriter
- Brian "B-LUV" Thomas – music recorded by
- Randy Urbanski – audio mixing assistant
- Andrew Wuepper – audio mixing assistant

== Charts ==
=== Weekly charts ===
Chart (2008–2010)	Peak position
Australia (ARIA)	5
Australia Urban (ARIA)	2
Belgium (Ultratop 50 Flanders)	11
Belgium (Ultratop 50 Wallonia)	34
Brazil (Hot 100 Airplay)	1
Bulgaria (BAMP)	5
Canada (Canadian Hot 100)	2
Canada CHR/Top 40 (Billboard)	2
Canada Hot AC (Billboard)	1
CIS Airplay (TopHit)	17
Croatia International Airplay (HRT)	2
Czech Republic (Rádio Top 100)	13
Denmark (Tracklisten)	21
European Hot 100 Singles (Billboard)	20
France (SNEP) Download Chart	43
Germany (Official German Charts) with "If I Were a Boy"	3
Global Dance Tracks(Billboard)	4
Hungary (Rádiós Top 40)	14
Ireland (IRMA)	4
Israel (Media Forest)	2
Italy (FIMI)	10
Japan (Japan Hot 100)	25
Mexico (Billboard Ingles Airplay)	3
Netherlands (Dutch Top 40)	8
Netherlands (Single Top 100)	12
New Zealand (Recorded Music NZ)	2
Norway (VG-lista)	19
Portugal Digital Song Sales (Billboard)	10
Russia Airplay (TopHit)	38
Russia Airplay (TopHit) Dave Audé remix	48
Slovakia (Rádio Top 100)	20
South Korea (Gaon)	47
Scottish Singles Sales (Official Charts)	5
Spain (Promusicae)	10
Sweden (Sverigetopplistan)	40
Switzerland (Schweizer Hitparade)	40
UK Singles (Official Charts)	7
UK R&B (OCC)	1
US Billboard Hot 100	1
US Adult R&B Songs (Billboard)	21
US Dance Club Songs (Billboard)	1
US Hot R&B/Hip-Hop Songs (Billboard)	1
US Mainstream Top 40 (Billboard)	1
US Pop 100 (Billboard)	2
US Rhythmic Airplay (Billboard)	2

Chart (2011)	Peak position
France (SNEP)	68

=== Year-end charts ===
Chart (2008)	Position
Australia (ARIA)	74
Australia Urban (ARIA)	22
Germany (Official German Charts) with "If I Were a Boy"	71
Japan Adult Contemporary (Billboard)	62
UK Singles (OCC)	175
US Hot R&B/Hip-Hop Songs (Billboard)	75

Chart (2009)	Position
Australia (ARIA)	14
Australia Urban (ARIA)	6
Belgium (Ultratop 50 Flanders)	59
Brazil (Crowley)	19
Canada (Canadian Hot 100)	19
Germany (Official German Charts) with "If I Were a Boy"	46
Hungary (Rádiós Top 40)	73
Ireland (IRMA)	17
Netherlands (Dutch Top 40)	43
Netherlands (Single Top 100)	78
New Zealand (Recorded Music NZ)	31
Spain (PROMUSICAE)	38
Sweden (Sverigetopplistan)	95
UK Singles (OCC)	34
US Billboard Hot 100	8
US Dance Club Songs (Billboard)	30
US Digital Song Sales (Billboard)	6
US Hot R&B/Hip Hop Songs (Billboard)	6
US Hot Ringtones (Billboard)	31
US Mainstream Top 40 (Billboard)	19
US Radio Songs (Billboard)	11
US Rhythmic (Billboard)	22
World (IFPI)	7

Chart (2010)	Position
Australia Urban (ARIA)	29
South Korea (Gaon)	21
UK Singles (OCC)	172

Chart (2011)	Position
Belgium Catalog (Ultratop 50 Flanders)	44

Chart (2012)	Position
Belgium Catalog (Ultratop 50 Flanders)	72
Belgium Catalog (Ultratop 50 Wallonia)	75

Chart (2013)	Position
Australia Urban (ARIA)	41
Belgium Catalog (Ultratop 50 Flanders)	34
Belgium Catalog (Ultratop 50 Wallonia)	48

Chart (2014)	Position
Australia Urban (ARIA)	48
Belgium Catalog (Ultratop 50 Flanders)	69

=== Decade-end charts ===
Chart (2000–2009)	Position
Australia (ARIA)	39
US Billboard Hot 100	99
US Hot R&B/Hip-Hop Songs (Billboard)	16

== Certifications ==
Region	Certification	Certified units/sales
Australia (ARIA)	10× Platinum	700,000^{‡}
Canada (Music Canada)	6× Platinum	480,000^{‡}
Canada (Music Canada) Mastertone	Platinum	40,000^{*}
Canada (Music Canada) Video	Platinum	10,000^{^}
Denmark (IFPI Danmark)	Platinum	90,000^{‡}
Germany (BVMI)	3× Gold	450,000^{‡}
Italy (FIMI) Since 2009	Gold	15,000^{‡}
Mexico (AMPROFON)	4× Platinum+Gold	270,000^{‡}
New Zealand (RMNZ)	4× Platinum	120,000^{‡}
Spain (Promusicae)	Platinum	40,000^{*}
United Kingdom (BPI)	3× Platinum	1,800,000^{‡}
United States (RIAA)	11× Platinum	11,000,000^{‡}
United States (RIAA) Mastertone	Platinum	1,000,000^{*}
^{*} Sales figures based on certification alone.^{^} Shipments figures based on certification alone.^{‡} Sales+streaming figures based on certification alone.

== Release history ==
Release dates and formats for "Single Ladies (Put a Ring on It)"
Region	Date	Format(s)	Label(s)	Ref.
United States	October 13, 2008	Rhythmic contemporary radio; urban contemporary radio	Columbia	
Australia	November 24, 2008	Digital download	Sony Music	
Austria	February 5, 2009	Digital download (EP)	Sony Music	
Belgium	February 5, 2009	Digital download (EP)	Sony Music	
Canada	February 5, 2009	Digital download (EP)	Sony Music	
Denmark	February 5, 2009	Digital download (EP)	Sony Music	
Finland	February 5, 2009	Digital download (EP)	Sony Music	
France	February 5, 2009	Digital download (EP)	Sony Music	
Ireland	February 5, 2009	Digital download (EP)	Sony Music	
Italy	February 5, 2009	Digital download (EP)	Sony Music	
Mexico	February 5, 2009	Digital download (EP)	Sony Music	
Netherlands	February 5, 2009	Digital download (EP)	Sony Music	
Norway	February 5, 2009	Digital download (EP)	Sony Music	
Portugal	February 5, 2009	Digital download (EP)	Sony Music	
Spain	February 5, 2009	Digital download (EP)	Sony Music	
Sweden	February 5, 2009	Digital download (EP)	Sony Music	
Switzerland	February 5, 2009	Digital download (EP)	Sony Music	
United Kingdom	February 5, 2009	Digital download (EP)	RCA	
United States	February 10, 2009	Digital download (EP)	Columbia; Music World	
United Kingdom	February 16, 2009	CD	RCA	

== See also ==
- List of best-selling singles in the United States
- List of number-one R&B singles of 2008 (U.S.)
- List of number-one R&B singles of 2009 (U.S.)
- List of singles which have spent the most weeks on the UK Singles Chart
- List of best-selling singles in Australia
