= Chuck Klosterman IV =

2006 book by Chuck Klosterman

Chuck Klosterman IV: A Decade of Curious People and Dangerous Ideas
- Language: English
- Subject: pop culture
- Publisher: Scribner
- Publication date: August 23, 2006
- Publication place: United States
- Media type: Print (hardcover and paperback)
- Pages: 384
- ISBN: 0-7432-8488-7
- OCLC: 65425972
- Dewey Decimal: 814/.6 22
- LC Class: PN4874.K574 A25 2006
- Preceded by: Killing Yourself to Live: 85% of a True Story
- Followed by: Downtown Owl

Chuck Klosterman IV: A Decade of Curious People and Dangerous Ideas is a book written by Chuck Klosterman, first published by Scribner in 2006. It is the fourth book by Klosterman. The paperback edition was released in July 2007. The book consists of three sections: Things That Are True is a collection of previously published interviews with new introductions and footnotes; Things That Might Be True collects previously published opinion articles that include new footnotes and are preceded by hypothetical questions, a literary device Klosterman used in Sex, Drugs, and Cocoa Puffs: A Low Culture Manifesto; and Something That Isn't True At All is the beginning of an unfinished novel written in 2000. This final section is a departure for Klosterman, as it is his first published work of fiction. The main character, Jack, is allegedly based upon Klosterman's personality traits, but the author asserts that the events which occur in the story are completely fictional.

== See also ==
- Advanced Genius Theory
