= Visible Man =

Visible Man or The Visible Man may refer to:

== Anatomy models ==
- "The Visible Man" and "The Visible Woman", plastic toys created by sculptor Marcel Jovine for Pyro Plastics Corporation
- Visible Human Project

== Books ==
- The Visible Man, science fiction stories by Gardner Dozois 1975
- Visible Man, novel about racism by George Gilder 1978
- Becoming a Visible Man, Jamison Green 2004
- The Visible Man (novel), novel by Chuck Klosterman 2011
- Visible Man, biography of Henry Dumas by Jeffrey B. Leak 2014
- The Visible Man, comic series in 2000 AD (comics)

== Film ==
- The Visible Man, art documentary about Benny Andrews VHS, 1996

== Music ==
- The Visible Men, band
- The Visible Man (album), limited edition remix album by David Byrne 1998
