= Football (disambiguation) =

Football is a family of sports that involve kicking with the foot or carrying in the hands a ball to score points.

Football may refer to:

== Sports ==
- Association football (known as football in most of the world and soccer in North America, Australia, New Zealand and Ireland)
- Australian rules football
- Gaelic football (known as football in Ireland)
- Gridiron football (known as football in North America and gridiron in Australia and New Zealand)
  - American football
  - Canadian football
- International rules football
- Rugby football
  - Rugby league
  - Rugby union
- Football (ball), any of several types of balls used to play the football sports
  - Ball (association football)
  - Gaelic ball
  - Ball (gridiron football)
  - Rugby ball

== Arts and entertainment ==
=== Film and television ===
- Football (film), a 1982 Indian Malayalam film
- "Football" (Adventure Time), a 2015 television episode
- "Football" (Drake & Josh), a 2004 television episode
- "Football" (Not Going Out), a 2023 television episode

=== Video games ===
- Football (video game), an American football arcade (1978) and Atari 2600 (1979) game
- NFL Football (video game), an American football game for Intellivision (1980) and the Atari 2600 (1982)

=== Other media ===
- Football (board game), a game simulating association football
- Football (book), a 2026 nonfiction book by Chuck Klosterman
- Football (magazine), a Russian association football and ice hockey magazine
- Football (painting), an 1839 painting by Thomas Webster

== Other uses ==
- Football (word), an English-language word with various meanings and uses
- Football Mountain, an Antarctic mountain
  - The Football (Antarctica), a bare rock scar on the mountain
- Nuclear football, or the football, a briefcase carrying a triggering device to allow the President of the United States to authorize a nuclear attack

== See also ==
- Ball (disambiguation)
