= The 1990s =

The 1990s may refer to:

- 1990s, the decade
- List of decades, decades comprising years 90–99 of other centuries
- 1990s (band), Scottish Indie Rock band
- "Nineties" (song), the song by Busted
- The 90's (TV series), an American documentary series for PBS
- Nineties (TV series), the Czech television series
- The Nineties (miniseries), the CNN documentary
- The Nineties (book), the book by Chuck Klosterman
