= J-Setting =

Dance style popularized by the Prancing J-Settes

J-Setting is a style of dance popularized by the Prancing J-Settes, the collegiate women's danceline of Jackson State University's Sonic Boom of the South marching band. It originated in the late 1970s from African-Americans in the Jackson, Mississippi, area of the United States.

The signature dance move of J-Setting are powerful body and arm thrusts known as bucking. Bucking is derived from traditional African dance movements. J-Setting is characterized by a lead and follow format where one dancer initiates a series of high-energy dance moves, and the other dancers join in the movement. J-Setting features specific dance steps based on Prancing J-Settes marching techniques including the "J-Sette Walk," the "Salt and Pepper," the "Strut," and the "Tip Toe". In particular, the "Salt and Pepper" is a type of prance step for which the Prancing J-Settes are named and known. It is a high-knee lift or "high step" style of marching. Alternating legs lift with a bent knee to bring the foot up to the height of the opposite knee before returning the foot to the ground.

Traditionally, Prancing J-Settes are positioned behind the captain on three distinct named rows based on height for non-field performances. The three rows are "Short & Sassy", "Magnificent Middle", and "Tall & Tough". While performing, dancers may also change dance formation similar to the way that marching bands change formation during shows on football fields.

The J-Setting style of dress is often modeled after the dance uniforms of the JSU Prancing J-Settes. It normally includes a one or two piece bodysuit or form-fitting garment that covers the torso and crotch; and hosiery with knee high boots on the legs. However, other types of garments are also worn during a performance.

== History and background ==
In 1971, Shirley Middleton and the other majorettes of the Jackson State University Marching Band met with then JSU president, Dr. John A. Peoples, to request that they be permitted to "put down their batons." The JSU President agreed; and as the majorette sponsor, Middleton assembled 18 female students to become the first Jaycettes (currently called J-Settes). Middleton, a formally trained ballet dancer, established technical performance standards for the J-Settes, as well as, standards for academic and personal behavior for its members when they were not performing. Dr. Jimmie James Jr., then Chair of the JSU Department of Music, described the new dance team as "the thrill of a thousand eyes." During Middleton's tenure, performances included dance routines to songs such as "James Brown's "Make it Funky," and "Hot Pants" as performed by the JSU Marching Band.

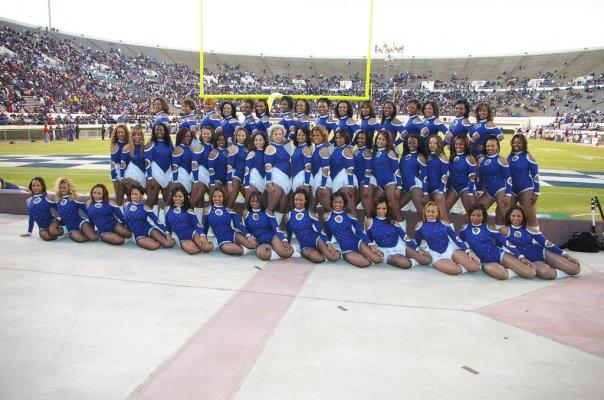
The 2006 Prancing J-Settes homecoming reunion

Prior to 1975, Hollis Pippins, an openly gay former JSU student who served as a drum major and baton twirler for the JSU marching band, collaborated with Prancing J-Settes director Shirley Middleton on choreography and the creative direction of the danceline. In addition to performing with the JSU marching band, he performed on "Soul Train" and "Putting on the Hits" national television shows; and on "Black Gold", a local TV show. In 1975, Narah Oatis was appointed the sponsor of the Prancing J-Settes. Under her leadership, the "J-Sette Walk" and other signature marching steps were developed, and performances included an appearance on the "30th Anniversary of Motown" television show in 1990. Narah Oatis resigned from her position in 1997. Prancing J-Sette alumna Kathy Pinkston-Worthy led the danceline from 1997 to 2013.

Since 2013, Jackson State graduate and former Prancing J-Sette captain Chloe A. Crowley, has been the director. The 2025-2027 Prancing J-Settes captain is Malikah Carr.

== Mainstream media attention and cultural impact ==
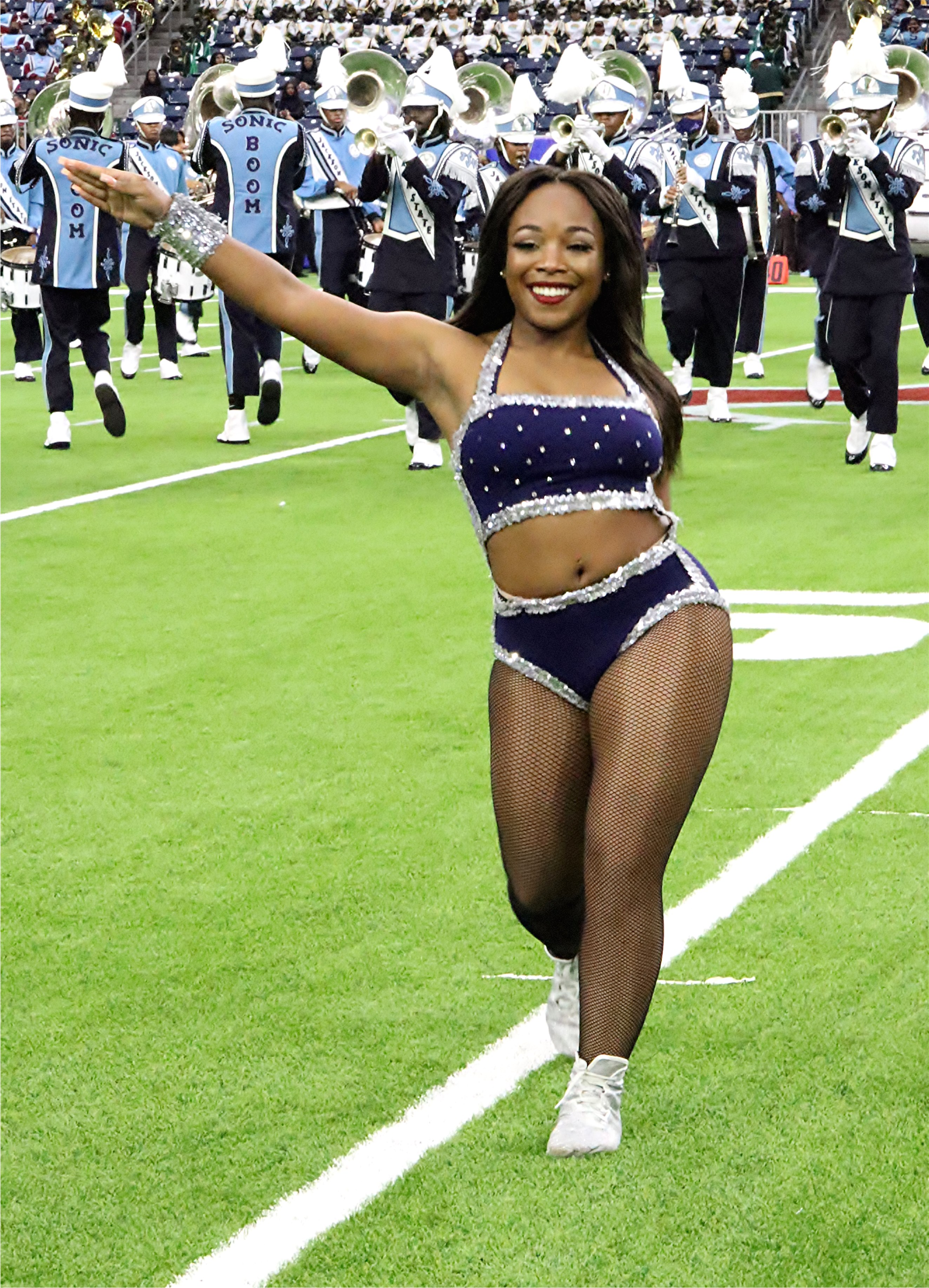
The 50th Prancing J-Settes captain in 2021

Since the 1970s, gay men have played a major role in the Prancing J-Settes' legacy. Gay men who enjoy the Prancing J-Settes regularly attend their performances, help design and create uniforms, help with dance routines, and befriend members of the danceline. Some of them brought the Prancing J-Settes dance style (J-Setting) outside Mississippi to popular Black gay pride events and gay nightclubs around the nation (particularly the South). J-Setting has become a notable subculture of Black gay culture.

In 1990, the Prancing J-Settes performed on the nationally televised "30th Anniversary of Motown" show.

In 2003, the Prancing J-Settes performed on the nationally televised "34th NAACP Image Awards" show. The Prancing J-Settes appeared as part of the JSU marching band in performances with comedian "Cedric the Entertainer" and "Sugar Bear of E.U."

In 2008, both Beyoncé's "Single Ladies (Put a Ring on It)" and "Diva" music videos included a J-Setting style dance routine. Choreographer Frank Gatson is credited with introducing the J-Setting dance style to Beyoncé. The competitions seen in Lifetime's Bring It! were inspired by J-Setting competitions. Critic Rico Self has noted that many the performances are popular in the black queer feminist community.

Beginning April 22, 2015, the Oxygen channel began broadcasting a 12-episode documentary series entitled The Prancing Elites Project, focusing on the J-Setting group from Mobile, Alabama. The Prancing Elites had begun to attract national attention after a complimentary Tweet from Shaquille O'Neal in June 2013, which led to an appearance on the syndicated talk show The Real.

In 2018, a released documentary entitled "When The Beat Drops", chronicled the progression of J-Setting and its impact on black gay culture in the South. Also in 2018, Great Big Story released a short documentary on YouTube about the Prancing J-Settes of Jackson State University and how their distinctive style of dance influenced dance culture. And also in 2018, four Prancing J-Settes were invited to appear in a commercial with Ciara.

In 2019, the Prancing J-Settes were featured in a commercial with MAC Cosmetics for their Winter Holiday Collection.

In 2022, the Prancing J-Settes were featured on ABC's Good Morning America during JSU's homecoming week.

== See also ==
- Sonic Boom of the South
- Bring It! (TV series)
- The Prancing Elites Project
