= Downtown Owl =

2008 novel by Chuck Klosterman

- First edition
- Author: Chuck Klosterman
- Language: English
- Genre: Dark comedy
- Publisher: Scribner
- Publication date: September 16, 2008
- Publication place: United States
- Media type: Print (hardback & paperback)
- Pages: 275
- ISBN: 1-4165-4418-6
- OCLC: 180755981
- Dewey Decimal: 813/.6 22
- LC Class: PS3611.L67 D69 2008
- Preceded by: Chuck Klosterman IV: A Decade of Curious People and Dangerous Ideas
- Followed by: Eating the Dinosaur

Downtown Owl: A Novel is a novel written by Chuck Klosterman, first published by Scribner in 2008. It is the author's first all-fictional publication.

== Plot outline ==
The story describes the fictional town of Owl, North Dakota, in which three characters are intangibly connected. Horace is an old man who spends his afternoons in the local coffee shop with other old men, shaking dice to see who pays for coffee, and talking about politics, religion, and memorable Owl football teams of the past. Mitch is a stoic high school backup quarterback who is depressed for no apparent reason. Julia is the newest resident of Owl. She moved to the small town to teach history and spends much of her free time at the local bars (where she meets local celebrity Vance Druid). The town has about 850 residents and is semi-isolated from 1980s music and culture. As a climax, the three main characters are caught in a sudden blizzard — Horace and Julia stuck in their cars and Mitch outdoors.

== Film adaptation ==
In October 2012, Gettin' Rad Productions, the production company owned by Adam Scott and his wife, Naomi Scott, optioned the movie rights to Downtown Owl. "It’s lovely and moving and funny. We just thought it’s a really great story about people that I relate to but also small enough that it would make a good first film out of the gate for us," Adam Scott was quoted in The Hollywood Reporter.

Film School Rejects writer Neil Miller said, "This book is rich with unique and interesting characters and situations that would be perfect matches for a Coen-esque romp through 1983 rural North Dakota."

In April 2022, Deadline reported that a film adaptation of the novel was being co-directed and co-produced by Lily Rabe and Hamish Linklater, from a screenplay by the latter, with Rabe's producing partner Bettina Barrow serving as co-producer, in association with Stage 6 Films. Rabe, Ed Harris, Vanessa Hudgens, Finn Wittrock, Jack Dylan Grazer, August Blanco Rosenstein, and Henry Golding were announced as the cast. Filming began in April in Minnesota, and wrapped by the end of that month. The film is expected to release in 2023, by Sony Pictures Releasing.
