= Eating the Dinosaur =

2009 book by Chuck Klosterman

- Author: Chuck Klosterman
- Language: English
- Subject: pop culture
- Publisher: Scribner
- Publication date: October 20, 2009
- Publication place: United States
- Media type: Print (hardcover)
- Pages: 256
- ISBN: 1-4165-4420-8
- OCLC: 317923385
- Preceded by: Downtown Owl
- Followed by: I Wear the Black Hat: Grappling with Villains (Real and Imagined)

Eating the Dinosaur is the sixth book written by Chuck Klosterman, first published by Scribner in 2009. In the mold of Klosterman's earlier Sex, Drugs, and Cocoa Puffs, the book is a collection of previously unpublished essays concerning an array of pop culture topics. The book cover was designed by Paul Sahre.

== Essays ==
Eating the Dinosaur consists of 13 essays:

- Something Instead of Nothing: an examination of the journalistic interview employing interviews with Errol Morris, documentary filmmaker, and Ira Glass, radio producer and host
- Oh, the Guilt: a comparison of two men: Kurt Cobain, Nirvana front man, and David Koresh, Branch Davidian leader
- Tomorrow Rarely Knows: an analysis of time travel in fiction with a particular focus on Shane Carruth's 2004 Sundance Film Festival winner Primer
- What We Talk About When We Talk About Ralph Sampson: an exposition about the career and legacy of basketball star Ralph Sampson
- Through a Glass, Blindly: a discussion of voyeurism in real life and in media, such as Alfred Hitchcock's 1954 film, Rear Window
- The Passion of the Garth: a critique of Garth Brooks' alter ego project, Chris Gaines
- Going Nowhere and Getting There Never: an exploration of the automobile's place in the American cultural psyche
- "The Best Response": a series of "best responses" to controversial questions
- Football: a piece about conservatism and progressivism in American football
- ABBA 1, World 0: a retrospective of the unique style, particular appeal to American audiences, and lasting relevancy of Swedish pop music group, ABBA
- "Ha ha," he said. "Ha ha.": a criticism of laugh tracks in sitcoms
- It Will Shock You How Much It Never Happened: a discussion of PepsiCo's advertising strategies
- All The Kids Are Right: an examination of pop music's aesthetic legitimacy
- T is for True: an analysis of irony and literalism in media and the works and psyches of Weezer front man Rivers Cuomo, German filmmaker Werner Herzog, and American politician Ralph Nader
- FAIL: an exegesis of the Unabomber Manifesto

== Reception ==
Eating the Dinosaur was positively received by critics. The Wall Street Journal discussed Klosterman's "pixelated intelligence and vivid prose," concluding, "Mr. Klosterman's relentlessly thoughtful prose makes a case that our arts and entertainment are more suffused with meaning than ever before. Even as he's fretting over the direction of the culture, his writing stands as an eloquent defense of it." At The A.V. Club, critic Samantha Nelson wrote that Klosterman's work had "matured".

== See also ==
- Social effects of television
- Postmodernist film
- NPR
