= Sonic Boom of the South =

Marching band of Jackson State University

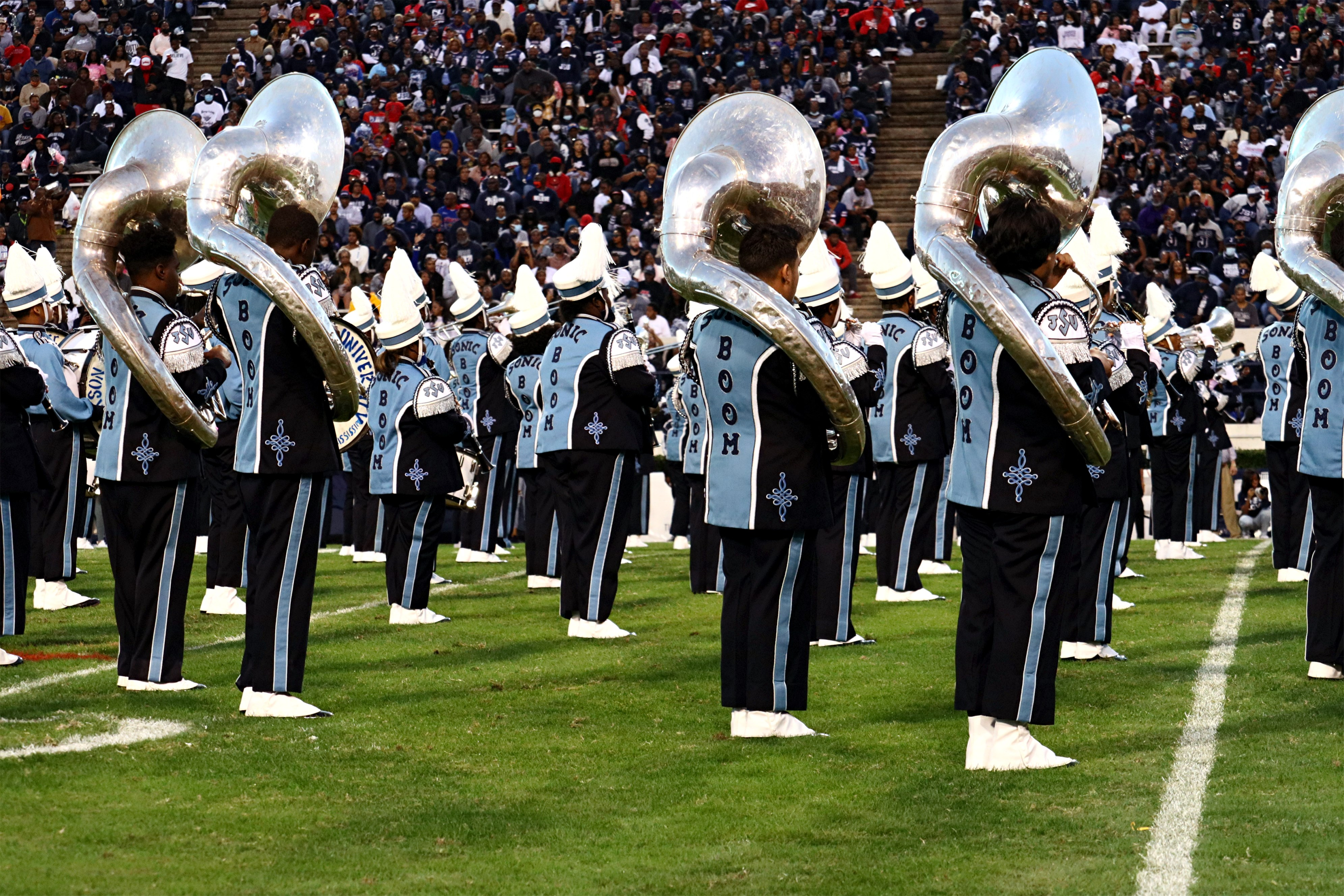
- Nickname: The Sonic Boom of the South, SBOTS, Da Boom
- School: Jackson State University
- Location: Jackson, Mississippi, US
- Conference: SWAC
- Founded: 1940s
- Director: Dr. Roderick Little
- Members: 300+
- Website: Sonic Boom of the South

The Sonic Boom of the South is the marching band of Jackson State University (JSU) located in Jackson, Mississippi, US. Its unique style and showmanship include the J5 drum majors, Prancing J-Settes, floating JSU, Tiger Run-On, the “Get Ready” entrance, and “The Series.” Its musical approach can be traced to the early years, when a former arranger, William W. Davis, was the director for Cab Calloway’s big band (1948–1971). The band performs marches, Jazz, Gospel, R&B, Hip-Hop, and Deep South Rap.

== History ==
The marching band began in the 1940s at what was then Jackson State College, under the directorship of Frederick D. Hall, who had directed a band at the college as early as the 1920s, in addition to the chorus and orchestra. It was initially made up of Jackson College and Lanier High School students

Founded as the Jackson State University Marching Band, the name "Sonic Boom of the South" was adopted by director Harold J. Haughton Sr. in 1971, having been suggested by band members. The first full-time band director, William W. Davis, was appointed in 1948, replacing Charles Saulsburg, who had been a director since 1947. Davis had previously played trumpet in Cab Calloway's band, and Calloway's musical style and showmanship influenced Davis's conceptualization of the marching band. The band had around 20 members then, increasing to 88 in 1963. Davis retired as director in 1971 but remained the chief arranger for the band. He was replaced by Harold J. Haughton.

Haughton acted as director until 1983; during his tenure, he changed the band uniform color from royal blue to light navy blue, introduced the Motown hit "Get Ready" as the band's theme, replaced the Majorettes with featured dancers, and introduced the "Tiger Run-on" shuffle, "Tiger Strut" and "Floating JSU" halftime display. In the Fall of 1983, shortly before Haughton left for an equivalent position at Virginia State University, he increased the band size to 160 members. He was replaced as director by Dowell Taylor. Taylor, an alumnus of the band, served as director from 1984 to 1992.

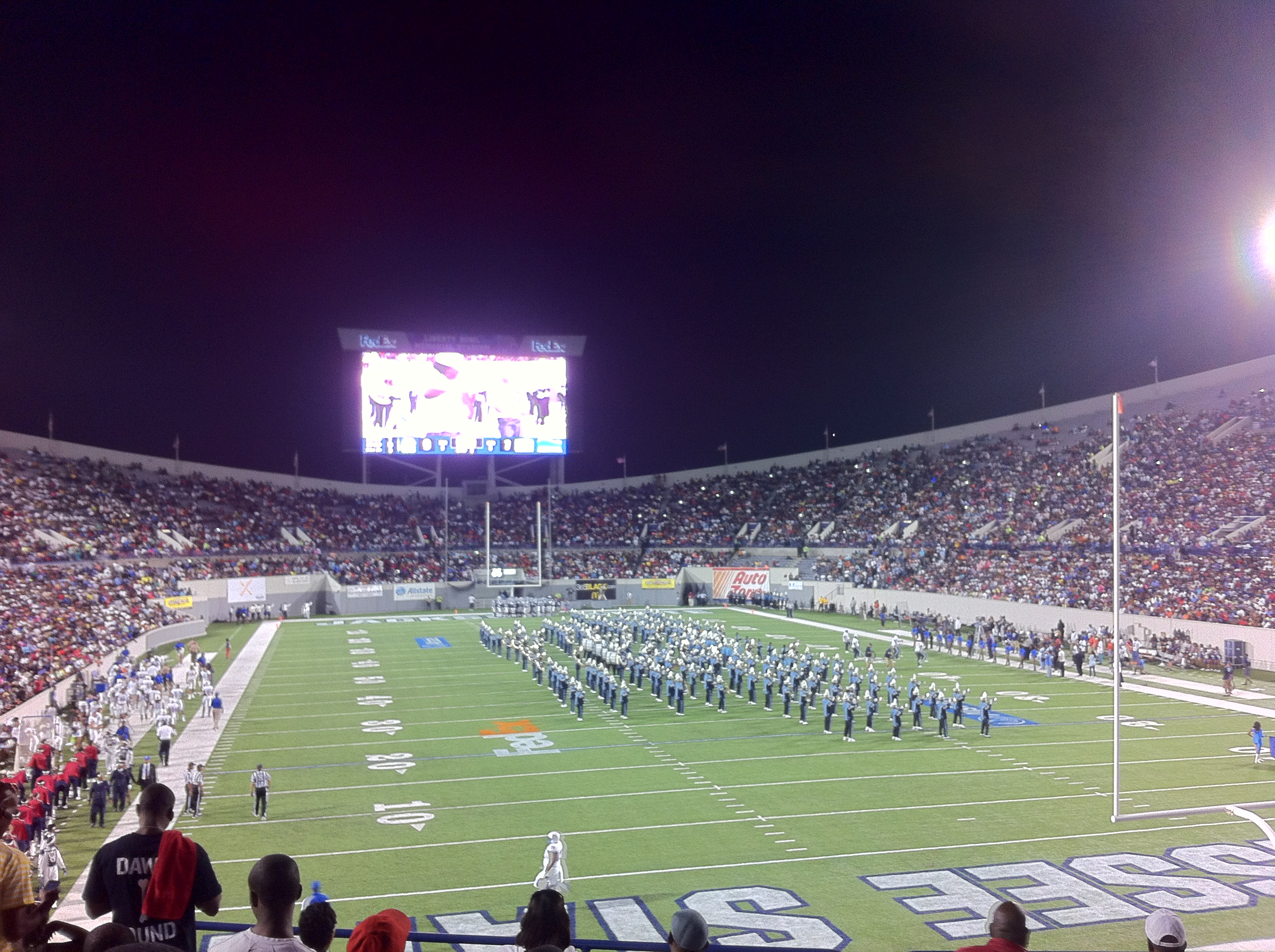
SBOTS performing at the 2013 Southern Heritage Classic

In 1992, Lewis Liddell became the third alumnus to lead the Sonic Boom of the South. The dancing "Baby Tigers" first appeared in a halftime show in 1994. In 2000, Liddell established the "Jackson 5" drum majors (also known as J5 - previously the Fabulous 4) and in 2001 announced the first woman drum major in the band's history. In 2003, the marching band was enshrined in the NCAA Hall of Champions.

O'Neill Sanford was director from 2016 to August 2017. Dowell Taylor returned as interim director in September 2017. Band size has decreased from 350 musicians to around 210 as a result of budget constraints.

In 2018, the SBOTS became the first and only collegiate marching band chosen to be featured by Great Big Story.

In 2019, members declined, and the band itself was suspended by the university because of hazing allegations. Similar problems led to disciplinary action in 2007, 2009, and 2015.

In 2020, alumnus and former drum major Roderick Little became one of the youngest directors in the band's history, second to Dowell Taylor.

In 2022, SBOTS was featured on ABC's Good Morning America during JSU's homecoming week.

In 2024, SBOTS performed with Usher during the Super Bowl LVIII halftime show.

SBOTS performed at the 2025 Rose Parade. The band also participated in the 44th Annual Bandfest before the ceremony.

The SBOTS performed at several notable occasions, such as Motown's 30th Anniversary, the 34th National Association for the Advancement of Colored People (NAACP) Image Awards, alongside "Cedric the Entertainer," a number of NFL games and their most recent performance at the 2021 Presidential Inauguration Parade.

== Marching style ==
The band marches with a high step, raising the knees to 90° and pointing the toes downwards. This military-style march is distinct from that employed by high school bands who march with a "corps step," keeping feet close to the ground and landing heel first, rolling forward onto the toes. The marchers also sway their bodies side-to-side in unison. When the band performs displays where the initials of the university ("JSU") or other initials are formed, the marchers have to take exact steps of 22½ inches.

== See also ==
- Prancing J-Settes
- BoomBox Classic
- Honda Battle of the Bands
