= The Prancing Elites Project =

- Genre: Reality television
- Starring: Adrian Clemons; Kentrell Collins; Kareem Davis; Jerel Maddox; Tim Smith
- Country of origin: United States
- Original language: English
- No. of seasons: 2
- No. of episodes: 22

Production
- Executive producers: Tom Cappello; Alana Goldstein
- Running time: 42 minutes
- Production company: Crazy Legs Productions

Original release
- Network: Oxygen
- Release: April 23, 2015 – March 22, 2016

The Prancing Elites Project is an American reality television series that premiered on April 22, 2015, on Oxygen. Announced in September 2014, the series follows a five-member dance team as they juggle their personal and professional lives in Mobile, Alabama. The cast members include Adrian Clemons, Kentrell Collins, Kareem Davis, Jerel Maddox and Tim Smith. The dance team is described by the network as "the African American, gay and gender non-conforming."

The show was subsequently renewed for a second season, which premiered on January 19, 2016. However, the show has been canceled and did not return after the summer of 2017.

== Cast ==
- Kentrell Collins
- Kareem Davis
- Jerel Maddox
- Tim Smith
- Adrian Clemons

== Episodes ==
=== Series overview ===
Season	Episodes	Originally released	
Season	Episodes	First released	Last released
1	12	April 22, 2015	July 8, 2015
2	10	January 19, 2016	March 22, 2016

=== Season 1 (2015) ===
No. overall	No. in season	Title	Original release date	U.S. viewers (millions)
1	1	"We Came To Dance"	April 22, 2015	0.627
2	2	"Prance to the Beat"	April 29, 2015	0.295
3	3	"Buckin in the Bayou"	May 6, 2015	N/A
4	4	"Secret Society Soiree"	May 13, 2015	N/A
5	5	"Ready, J-Sette, GO!"	May 20, 2015	N/A
6	6	"Prance on the Water"	May 27, 2015	N/A
7	7	"Shatter the Stigma"	June 3, 2015	N/A
8	8	"Beer, Bands and Bingo"	June 10, 2015	N/A
9	9	"Wedding Crashers"	June 17, 2015	N/A
10	10	"Prancing with the Stars"	June 24, 2015	N/A
11	11	"Reignite the Spark"	July 1, 2015	N/A
12	12	"Keep Prancing On..."	July 8, 2015	N/A

=== Season 2 (2016) ===
No. overall	No. in season	Title	Original release date	U.S. viewers (millions)
13	1	"Prance to My Own Beat"	January 19, 2016	N/A
14	2	"Its My Party and I'll Prance If I Want To"	January 26, 2016	N/A
15	3	"Prancing with the Enemy"	February 2, 2016	N/A
16	4	"Field Show of Dreams"	February 9, 2016	N/A
17	5	"Are You Fo' Real"	February 16, 2016	N/A
18	6	"The Art of the Prance"	February 23, 2016	N/A
19	7	"So You Think You Can Prance?"	March 1, 2016	N/A
20	8	"Prancing Queen"	March 8, 2016	N/A
21	9	"To Be or Not to Newbie"	March 15, 2016	N/A
22	10	"Prancing Near the Stars"	March 22, 2016	N/A

== See also ==
- J-Setting
