= Killing Yourself to Live: 85% of a True Story =

2005 book by Chuck Klosterman

- 2006 paperback edition cover
- Author: Chuck Klosterman
- Language: English
- Subject: Death, rock music
- Publisher: Scribner
- Publication date: June 28, 2005
- Publication place: United States
- Media type: Print (hardcover and paperback)
- Pages: 256
- ISBN: 0-7432-6445-2
- OCLC: 60684970
- Dewey Decimal: 781.660973 22
- LC Class: ML394 .K59 2005
- Preceded by: Sex, Drugs, and Cocoa Puffs: A Low Culture Manifesto
- Followed by: Chuck Klosterman IV: A Decade of Curious People and Dangerous Ideas

Killing Yourself to Live: 85% of a True Story is a work of non-fiction written by Chuck Klosterman, first published by Scribner in 2005.

== Background ==
The title is a reference to the 1973 song "Killing Yourself To Live", by the heavy metal band Black Sabbath. It is Klosterman's third book and focuses on the premise of writing about the relationship between love and death, particularly deaths involving music celebrities. The original feature, published in Spin in 2003, shares some ideas and language with the book.

== Synopsis ==
Klosterman's analysis focuses less on the actual circumstances leading to the deaths of rock musicians, but more on the existential and cultural implications that result. To these ends, Klosterman goes on a road trip, visiting the death sites of rock stars such as Duane Allman and Kurt Cobain. In a rented Ford Taurus, which he nicknamed "Tauntaun", Klosterman encounters a variety of interesting circumstances and people along the way, such as a teenager in Missoula, Montana, who asks him to sell her some cannabis, or a Cracker Barrel waitress who reads Kafka.

A large part of the narrative describes four (although primarily three) women from Klosterman's past and present who embody abstractions that he loves (and are later compared to the four original members of the band KISS). According to Klosterman, in the same way that a rock star's death grants them a transcendence beyond anything they may have embodied during the course of their career, so, too, these four women transcend their own effect on Klosterman to become the molds by which all other women will undoubtedly be understood.

The book contains much literary analysis of songs and the retelling of conversations from the author's past. Klosterman also includes a controversial passage about Radiohead's Kid A, proclaiming that track-by-track the 2000 album unintentionally details the events of the September 11 attacks, which would occur 11 months after its release.
