= The Visible Man (novel) =

2011 novel by Chuck Klosterman

- Author: Chuck Klosterman
- Language: English
- Genre: Fiction
- Publisher: Scribner
- Publication date: October 4, 2011
- Publication place: United States
- Media type: Print (hardback & paperback)
- Pages: 240
- ISBN: 978-1439184462
- OCLC: 837624462
- Dewey Decimal: 813/.6
- LC Class: 2010047309
- Preceded by: Eating the Dinosaur
- Followed by: I Wear the Black Hat

The Visible Man: A Novel is a novel written by Chuck Klosterman, first published by Scribner in 2011. It is the seventh book and second novel released by Klosterman. Thematically, The Visible Man touches on the way media transforms reality, the meaning of culture, and the dissonance of self-perception. It became a New York Times bestseller the month of its release.

== Plot synopsis ==
Victoria Vick, a therapist living in Austin, Texas, writes a book about her experience with a former client, Y___, a man whose name the reader never learns. Most of the novel takes the form of transcripts of their sessions based on recordings or memory.

Years ago, their professional relationship begins with therapy session over the phone, during which Victoria comes to believe he is a disturbed and delusional. Y___ professes to be a scientist working on an aborted secret government project he calls "cloaking technology." With a combination of futuristic fabric and light-refracting cream, Y___ says he is able to make himself invisible. Victoria does not believe him, so he arrives for an appointment in the suit. After the shock of learning that the cloaking technology is real, Victoria ceases to challenge any of Y___'s other claims of his intelligence, his moral reasoning, and his often erratic and aggressive attitude.

Y___ claims to spend most of his time observing people and living in their homes to learn how they behave when alone, which he insists is essential to completing his research. Y___ recounts stories from his observational research across numerous sessions, and Vick unsuccessfully attempts to diagnose and treat him. Victoria's focus on Y___ strains her relationship with her husband, John. Y___ reveals that he is experiencing transference and has romantic feelings for Victoria, which she rebuffs. After she tells John about Y___'s cloaking technology, John suspects that Y___ is invading their home to watch him, and Victoria also suspects that she is being watched. Vick attempts to enforce boundaries with Y___ and challenge the lies she believes he has told her; Y___ reacts poorly, quitting therapy and insisting that Victoria is denying her reciprocal feelings.

Some time later, Y___ invisibly enters the Vick home at night and attempts to murder John. John falls down a flight of stairs and Victoria calls the police. Y___ flees. Afterward, John survives but is partially paralyzed. Victoria's last contact with Y___ is a letter.

== Reception ==
The Visible Man has received favorable reviews, with Entertainment Weekly giving it an A−. The Dallas Morning News said of the book, "[It] is a rich, fast-paced and funny novel made to entertain lovers of literary metafiction, sci-fi and thrillers." When asked about the book, Klosterman has said, "If somebody asked me, 'What is this book about?' and I know that I only have one sentence to tell them, I would say, 'Well, it's how it would be to be the invisible man's therapist.' But if I read a review that said that and simplified it down, I would be like, 'That's totally wrong!'"
