= But What If We're Wrong? =

Book by Chuck Klosterman

But What If We're Wrong? Thinking About the Present As If It Were the Past
- Hardcover edition
- Author: Chuck Klosterman
- Language: English
- Subject: Culture, social science, epistemology
- Genre: Non-fiction
- Publisher: Penguin Press, Blue Rider Press imprint
- Publication date: June 7, 2016
- Publication place: United States
- Media type: Print, e-book, audiobook
- Pages: 288 pp
- ISBN: 978-0-399-18412-3

But What If We're Wrong? Thinking About the Present As If It Were the Past is a 2016 non-fiction book by American author and essayist Chuck Klosterman.

== Content and concepts ==
The premise of the book is that most of what we believe is likely to be wrong, but to avoid delusions in our perceptions, Klosterman advises us to "think about the present as if it were the distant past."

Klosterman examines such phenomena as the history of scientific theories, our perception of historical literary geniuses and our interests in entertainment and professional sports, as background examples to challenge the reader's confidence in their contemporary perceptions, and to try to detect how those perceptions might be mistaken. In a series of what have been called thought experiments, various topics (literary greats, multiverses, time, dreams, democracy, television shows, sports) are analyzed under "Klosterman's Razor": the concept that "the best hypothesis is the one that reflexively accepts its potential wrongness to begin with."

== Reception ==
But What If We're Wrong? reached The New York Times Best Seller list in the Culture category.

Jim Holt wrote in The New York Times that while he was "never bored" and Klosterman's goals were admirable, the book left him "exasperated," Holt asserting the book lacked rigor and treated profound questions with glibness: "My hackles raised, I argued inwardly with the author on every page."

Kirkus Reviews indicated the book is "full of intelligence and insights" and "makes readers think," challenging our beliefs "with jocularity and perspicacity."

Publishers Weekly acknowledged the book was "pop philosophy" but noted parts were based on interviews of "heavyweights," adding that Klosterman's humor and curiosity "propel the reader through the book."

In The Oregonian, Douglas Perry recognised the impossibility of the predicting the future, explaining why the book includes "endless streams of maybes, coulds and ifs, all leading to a shrug"—while affirming that Klosterman is "good company throughout the long, fruitless expedition."

In the Pittsburgh Post-Gazette, Will Ashton asserted the book to be Klosterman's most wide-reaching accomplishment to date and confirmed the writer's "signature wit," but wrote that Klosterman appeared "overwhelmed" by the challenge, leaving "an ongoing sense (Klosterman) is grasping here."

The book's cover, designed by Paul Sahre, was judged among the year's best, as chosen by the art director of The New York Times Book Review.
