= Bring It! (TV series) =

- Genre: Reality television
- Starring: Dianna Williams; Tamia Whittaker; Camryn Harris; Makalah Whisenton; Daija Wilson; Ken’Janae McGowan; Crystianna Summers; Kayla Jones; Sunjai Williams; Faith Thigpen; Shania "Star" Williams; Shamia "Sky" Williams; Kanarie Smith; Tina Jones; Mimi Harris; Selena Johnson; Dana Roilton; Makya Griffin; Tanesha Roberts; Valisa Summers; Rittany Anderson; Jaylene Rodriguez
- Country of origin: United States
- Original language: English
- No. of seasons: 5
- No. of episodes: 121

Production
- Executive producers: Colleen Conway Grogan; Craig Piligian; Derek W. Wan; Eli Lehrer; Mary Donahue; Kayla Jones; Tanisha Roberts
- Camera setup: Multiple
- Running time: 44 minutes
- Production company: Pilgrim Studios

Original release
- Network: Lifetime
- Release: March 5, 2014 – March 21, 2019

Bring It! is an American dance reality television series that first aired on March 4, 2014, on Lifetime.

On April 28, 2014, Lifetime announced an additional 10-episode renewal of Bring It!. Additional episodes returned on July 23, 2014.

The second season premiered on January 23, 2015. New episodes aired on July 31, 2015.

The third season premiered on January 1, 2016.

On December 1, 2016, Lifetime renewed the show for a fourth season, which premiered on January 13, 2017. Concurrent, Lifetime added a traveling tour, Bring It Live! shortly after.

Lifetime renewed the show for a fifth season, which premiered on March 2, 2018.

== Premise ==
Bring It! focuses on multi-style competition team based in Jackson, Mississippi. The features and follows Coach Dianna "Miss D" Williams and her Dollhouse Dance Factory, h which was founded in 2001. The troupe has over 15 Grand Champion titles and more than 100 trophies, and consists of children aged 10 to 17. The show also features the Baby Dancing Dolls, consisting of children under the age of 11.

The team competes in hip-hop majorette competitions, with their main focus being on Stand Battles, which are called by the captain depending on what stand the other team performs.

Rival dance teams featured on the show include the Divas of Olive Branch (the Dolls' main rival, due to the intense rivalry between Miss D and coach Neva), the Prancing Tigerettes (Memphis), the Infamous Dancerettes (a.k.a Dynamic Diamond Dollz, Memphis), the Purple Diamonds (a cross-town Jackson rival), the YCDT Superstars (Miami), and newer rival The Golden Prancerettes (Tueplo).

Similar to fellow Lifetime show Dance Moms, Bring It! features the moms of several dancers and their interactions (and occasional arguments) with Miss D. However, unlike Dance Moms (where the moms are in a room above the studio watching the practices), the moms in Bring It! are featured outside the studio. During early seasons, the parents could only see what happens in practice through the studio windows; in later seasons Miss D has made a room for the parents to watch the girls through a TV screen.

== Cast ==
=== DD4L ===
- Kayla, The Former Captain of the Dancing Dolls. She excels in hip-hop and majorette. Kayla was promoted from captain to assistant coach in Season 2, due to her Captian position being overtaken by Camryn. Kayla hopes that Camryn can uphold the responsibility similar to how she did.
- Camryn, Former Captain of The Dancing Dolls. She excels in majorette, lyrical, and jazz. Camryn was promoted from Drill Master to Co-Captain in Season 1, and Captain in Season 2. Camryn's dance techniques often intimidate the rest of the dancers. Following her promotion to Captian, the members of Dancing Dolls respects her more.
- Sunjai, Star, and Sky. Sunjai excels at majorette, jazz, and tap. Sunjai was a struggling dancer in Season 1 with her main goal being to make stand battle but always got cut. Before the end of Season 1, she finally made the cuts for stand battle, as the series progressed her dance techniques improved as well. Sunjai made her departure at the end of Season 2, due to graduation. Star and Sky are Sunjai's younger twin sisters. They are constantly mixed up by the DDPs and Coach Dianna.
- Crystianna, One of the Co-Captain of the Dancing Dolls. Crystianna excels at majorette and acro. Having been the youngest member of the stand battle team, she is always a good dancer to look at. Being a quiet but fierce dancer, she earned the nickname the "Silent Killer".
- Faith, Faith is a member of the Dancing Dolls who was introduced in Season 3. She excels in many aspects of dance, but is new to the majorette style.
- Jalen, Originally a Dancing Doll before she was kicked off in 2010. She returned to the Dancing Dolls in 2015, after being a member on rival team: Purple Diamonds.
- Tanesha, Who suffers from performance anxiety and later becomes Head Drill Master in 2018.
- Angel and Angela, Angela ends up making it to the battle squad team not too long after her first year on the team.
- Madyson, Hailed from the Purple Diamonds to the Dancing Dolls. Madyson was awarded DrillMaster in 2018.
- Princess, Former Prancing Tigerettes Captain who joined the Dancing Dolls later in the show. Princess is the former captain of the Dancing Dolls of Atlanta.
- Jaylene, A New York contortionist who joins the Dancing Dolls in Season 5. She was briefly on the Dancing Dolls of Atlanta.
- Tré and Quad, Are twins and male hip-hop dancers.

=== Opposing team coaches ===
- Matthew Thomas is the coach of Dance Force Elite of Chicago, Illinois
- Joerick Grice is the coach of the up & coming Golden Prancerettes of Tupelo, Mississippi
- Quincy Oliver is coach of the Prancing Tigerettes
- John Connor is the coach of the Infamous Dancerettes (beginning in Season 2); he was previously (Season 1) coach of the Dynamic Diamond Dollz
- Neva McGruder is coach of the Divas of Olive Branch; the rivalry between Neva and Miss D extends beyond the dance floor
- Shanika Lee is the coach of the Purple Diamonds, the Dolls' Jackson cross-town rival
- Traci Young-Byron is coach of the YCDT Supastarz and was once a dancer for the Miami Heat (in 2015 YCDT were featured in a spin-off series, Step It Up!)
- Fulvia Ford is coach of Virtuous Divine of Greenwood, Mississippi
- Rick Calloway, Penelope Holloway are the coaches of The Dazzling Divas of Macon GA. "F.A.D.D"
- Helenor Wade is the coach of the Dazzlin Starz
- Kehli "Professor Kehlz" Berry is the coach of The Divas of Compton
- Rodney Jones is the coach of the Pearls of Perfection of Macon GA.
- Tyrus Sellers is the coach of Elite Starz of Nashville.
- Charkeitha Ramey is the coach of Xplosive Dance Company of Dallas, Texas
- McCoy W. Flood is the coach of The Lowndes County Dance Company (LCDC) of Columbus, Mississippi.
- Chelsea Thomas is the coach of Divas of Dance of Lake Charles, Louisiana
- Arlando Durham & Donnie Lynn are the coaches of Black Ice of Cincinnati, Ohio
- Kevon I. Sims is the coach of The Champagne Girls of New Orleans, Louisiana

=== Other cast members ===
- Robert Williams - Dianna's husband
- Cobe Williams - Dianna's son
- Terrell - Kayla's father
- Calvin - Camryn's father
- JJ - Sunjai, Star and Sky's father
- Dominic - Faith's father
- Jay Fever - Announcer/Event Host
- Torrey - Technique and Ballet Instructor
- Marquell - Assissant coach .
- Ariel - Assistant Coach

== Episodes ==
=== Series overview ===
Season	Episodes	Originally released	
Season	Episodes	First released	Last released
1	22	March 5, 2014	October 1, 2014
2	25	January 23, 2015	October 2, 2015
3	25	January 1, 2016	September 23, 2016
4	26	January 13, 2017	February 2, 2018
5	23	March 2, 2018	March 21, 2019

=== Season 1 (2014) ===
No.	Title	Original release date	U.S. viewers (millions)
1	"You Better Bring It!"	March 5, 2014	1.01
The Dancing Dolls dance team prepares to compete against a fierce rival in Chattanooga, TN. Head coach, Dianna, forbids a number of dancers from participating at the event after less-than-perfect performances at rehearsal and team captain, Kayla, struggles with the added pressure of performing a solo. Meanwhile, Rittany, one of the dancers' moms butt heads with Dianna and threatens to pull her daughter from the team.
2	"Battle in Memphis"	March 12, 2014	1.09
The Dancing Dolls compete in Memphis against some of the best dance teams in the South. Rittany tires of Dianna's harsh teaching style and pulls Chrystianna out of rehearsal; and a judging controversy leads to a riot.
3	"The Wig is Off"	March 19, 2014	1.28
After getting cheated the week before, the Dancing Dolls return to Memphis looking for payback and are determined to beat one of their biggest rivals, the Prancing Tigerettes. Sunjai learns a hard lesson about what it takes to make a stand battle crew and her mother, Selena, learns a lesson of her own when she tries to bully Dianna. Meanwhile, Camryn gets a chance to perform her first solo at competition.
4	""Baby" Doll Don't Mean "Baby""	March 26, 2014	1.54
After losing Stand Battle two weeks in a row, the Dancing Dolls enlist their pint-sized counterparts, the Baby Dancing Dolls, to compete in their place so they can focus on developing a secret weapon to defeat their biggest rivals, The Prancing Tigerettes. Meanwhile, Selena's bad behavior threatens her daughter Sunjai's future, on the team. And team captain, Kayla, feels the pressure as her teammates begin to question her leadership.
5	"Sunjai in Stilettos"	April 2, 2014	1.70
6	"Street Battle"	April 9, 2014	1.65
7	"Shut Up and Dance"	April 16, 2014	1.90
8	"The Lock-In"	April 23, 2014	1.75
9	"The Finale: Battle Royale"	April 30, 2014	2.30
10	"Miss D Breaks it Down"	May 7, 2014	0.89
11	"Behind the Battles"	May 14, 2014	0.83
12	"So You Wanna Be A Doll?"	July 23, 2014	1.56
13	"Prom or Competition?"	July 30, 2014	1.29
14	"A New Rival Emerges"	August 6, 2014	1.51
15	"Kayla's Big Surprise"	August 13, 2014	1.38
16	"Nashville Smackdown"	August 20, 2014	1.08
17	"Baby Dolls vs. Baby Tigerettes"	August 27, 2014	1.27
18	"Pray for Sunjai"	September 3, 2014	1.26
19	"Dolls vs. Dollz: The Rematch"	September 10, 2014	1.30
20	"Bucking for Revenge"	September 17, 2014	1.22
21	"Chumps or Champions?"	September 24, 2014	1.29
22	"Bring It Special"	October 1, 2014	1.05

=== Season 2 (2015) ===
No.	Title	Original release date	U.S. viewers (millions)
1 (23)	"Miami Heat is Back"	January 23, 2015	1.82
2 (24)	"Miss D Loses Her Cool"	January 30, 2015	1.41
3 (25)	"Hometown Showdown"	February 6, 2015	1.61
4 (26)	"Bucking In Bama"	February 13, 2015	1.20
5 (27)	"Selena's Triple Threat"	February 20, 2015	1.62
6 (28)	"No Stopping Kayla"	February 27, 2015	1.43
7 (29)	"Stamp Out Atlanta"	March 6, 2015	1.48
8 (30)	"Traci's Revenge"	March 13, 2015	1.55
9 (31)	"Captain Down"	March 20, 2015	1.44
10 (32)	"Don't Do It, Neva"	March 27, 2015	1.67
11 (33)	"Baby Tiger Attack"	April 3, 2015	1.30
12 (34)	"Copycat"	April 10, 2015	1.44
13 (35)	"Road to Royale"	April 17, 2015	1.49
14 (36)	"Battle Royale 2015"	April 24, 2015	1.69
15 (37)	"Rival Rehash"	May 1, 2015	0.93
16 (38)	"A Whole New Doll Game"	July 31, 2015	1.39
17 (39)	"Dancing Dolls NOT for Life"	August 7, 2015	1.26
18 (40)	"Selena's Makeover Madness"	August 14, 2015	1.36
19 (41)	"The Big Apple and the Bitter Apple"	August 21, 2015	1.26
20 (42)	"Saturday Night Fights"	August 28, 2015	1.32
21 (43)	"Who You Callin' Cookie?"	September 4, 2015	1.37
22 (44)	"Pom Pom Panic"	September 11, 2015	1.39
23 (45)	"Tick, Tick, Boom!"	September 18, 2015	1.06
24 (46)	"Summer Slam"	September 25, 2015	1.57
25 (47)	"Bring It! Bonus Round Special"	October 2, 2015	0.82

=== Season 3 (2016) ===
No.	Title	Original release date	U.S. viewers (millions)
1 (48)	"A Very Bring It! New Year"	January 1, 2016	0.97
2 (49)	"Straight Outta Jackson"	January 1, 2016	1.36
3 (50)	"The Bucking Ballerina"	January 8, 2016	1.22
4 (51)	"Hell Week"	January 15, 2016	1.14
5 (52)	"Homecoming Hell"	January 22, 2016	1.33
6 (53)	"Rittany's Revolt"	January 29, 2016	1.35
7 (54)	"The Wicked Witch of Jackson"	February 5, 2016	1.54
8 (55)	"Bucking Bride"	February 12, 2016	1.25
9 (56)	"Blow it Up"	February 19, 2016	1.44
10 (57)	"Flash Mob Madness"	February 26, 2016	1.38
11 (58)	"3 Strikes, You're Out"	March 4, 2016	1.19
12 (59)	"Neva Gets Even"	March 11, 2016	1.32
13 (60)	"They're Coming for Us!!"	March 18, 2016	1.19
14 (61)	"Face the Music! It's the Finale!"	March 25, 2016	0.88
15 (62)	"Spilling the Tea Reunion Special"	April 1, 2016	N/A
16 (63)	"Team Kayla vs. Team Dianna"	July 22, 2016	1.08
17 (64)	"The Return of Neva the Diva"	July 29, 2016	1.07
18 (65)	"Compton Call Out"	August 5, 2016	1.13
19 (66)	"Ratchcity!"	August 12, 2016	1.18
20 (67)	"Hoop Dreams Drama"	August 19, 2016	1.12
21 (68)	"Scholarship Dreams and Dating Nightmares"	August 26, 2016	1.18
22 (69)	"Dancing With the Enemy"	September 2, 2016	1.09
23 (70)	"Wigging Out"	September 9, 2016	1.19
24 (71)	"Lil Niqo and a LOT of Sweat!"	September 16, 2016	1.22
25 (72)	"Stomp! Summer Slam Shocker"	September 23, 2016	1.30

=== Season 4 (2017–18) ===
No.	Title	Original release date	U.S. viewers (millions)
1 (73)	"Miss D Reboots"	January 13, 2017	1.16
2 (74)	"Diana Said Knock You Out!"	January 20, 2017	0.92
3 (75)	"Coach D Meets Queen B"	January 27, 2017	1.11
4 (76)	"Bringing It to the Big Apple"	February 3, 2017	1.02
5 (77)	"Torrey Takes Over"	February 10, 2017	1.03
6 (78)	"Losing Faith"	February 17, 2017	1.00
7 (79)	"A Tale of Two Dollhouses"	February 24, 2017	1.04
8 (80)	"Attack Of The B Squad"	March 3, 2017	0.90
9 (81)	"Black Ice Meltdown"	March 10, 2017	1.06
10 (82)	"Revenge of the Robo-Dolls"	March 17, 2017	1.10
11 (83)	"Cookie Bites Back"	March 24, 2017	1.14
12 (84)	"La La Land"	March 31, 2017	1.03
13 (85)	"Lemons to "Lemonade?""	April 7, 2017	0.97
14 (86)	"Battle for Broadway"	April 14, 2017	0.92
15 (87)	"Deliver Us From Neva"	April 21, 2017	0.82
16 (88)	"Battle Royale: Up in Flames!"	April 28, 2017	0.95
17 (89)	"Crossing the Line"	November 24, 2017	0.82
18 (90)	"Rumble in the Jungle"	December 1, 2017	0.72
19 (91)	"#Clapback"	December 8, 2017	0.73
20 (92)	"Battle for Oz"	December 15, 2017	0.74
21 (93)	"Secrets, Lies, And Slumber Parties"	December 29, 2017	0.79
22 (94)	"Coach D Resigns"	January 5, 2018	0.84
23 (95)	"Stand Battle Shake-Up"	January 12, 2018	0.77
24 (96)	"Doll Meets World"	January 19, 2018	0.80
25 (97)	"The Dolls' Last Chance"	January 26, 2018	0.78
26 (98)	"National Pressure"	February 2, 2018	0.75

=== Season 5 (2018–19) ===
No.	Title	Original release date	U.S. viewers (millions)
1 (99)	"If You Can't Stand The Heat..."	March 2, 2018	0.54
2 (100)	"The Sister Showdown"	March 9, 2018	0.56
3 (101)	"Let's Talk about Texts, Baby"	March 16, 2018	0.65
4 (102)	"Rivals United for a Cause"	March 23, 2018	0.67
5 (103)	"B-Squad Goals"	March 30, 2018	0.53
6 (104)	"Banned 4 Life?"	March 30, 2018	0.60
7 (105)	"Stands and Deliver"	August 16, 2018	0.40
8 (106)	"Dance For Your Rights"	August 16, 2018	0.41
9 (107)	"Who Wants To Be A Prop Star?"	August 23, 2018	0.43
10 (108)	"Grudge Match Gone Wrong"	August 23, 2018	0.48
11 (109)	"Three's a Crowd"	August 30, 2018	0.47
12 (110)	"The Ultimate Captain's Battle"	August 30, 2018	0.49
13 (111)	"Clash Of The Titans"	September 6, 2018	0.45
14 (112)	"No Boys Allowed?"	January 17, 2019	0.73
15 (113)	"A Dollhouse Abandoned"	January 24, 2019	0.59
16 (114)	"So You Think You Can Choreograph?"	January 31, 2019	0.58
17 (115)	"Survival of the Fittest"	February 7, 2019	0.58
18 (116)	"A Boy, A Kiss, And A Choreographer"	February 14, 2019	0.48
19 (117)	"A Star Is Born"	February 21, 2019	0.49
20 (118)	"Breaking The Curse Of The B-Squad"	February 28, 2019	0.52
21 (119)	"Dancing Doll Heist"	March 7, 2019	0.52
22 (120)	"The Seniors' Last Battle"	March 14, 2019	0.42
23 (121)	"Bring It Live! Detour"	March 21, 2019	0.45

== International broadcasts ==
In the United Kingdom, Lifetime UK premiered the series in late 2014, in 2016 another UK channel, ITVBe premiered the series on 2 September 2016.
