= The Nineties (book) =

2022 book by Chuck Klosterman

- Author: Chuck Klosterman
- Language: English
- Subject: Pop culture; history
- Publisher: Penguin Books
- Publication date: February 8, 2022
- Publication place: United States
- Media type: Print (hardcover and paperback)

The Nineties: A Book is a 2022 book by Chuck Klosterman. It is an analysis of historical trends and pop culture phenomena in the decade of the 1990s. It was released February 8, 2022, by Penguin Books. It debuted at No. 2 on The New York Times nonfiction bestseller list on February 27, 2022. It was also eventually nominated for that year's Goodreads Choice Awards in the Best Humor category.

== Summary ==
Topics include an exploration of grunge, a brief history of VHS rental stores and those who worked there (future film directors Quentin Tarantino and Kevin Smith), analysis of the 1992 and 2000 presidential elections, the rise of the Internet, the popularity of country musician Garth Brooks, the decade's stance against "selling out" and interviews with author Douglas Coupland about his 1991 novel Generation X: Tales for an Accelerated Culture.

== Partial list of shows, albums and films discussed ==
- Titanic
- Seinfeld
- Reality Bites
- Friends
- Falling Down
- Pulp Fiction
- Clerks
- Jagged Little Pill
- Exile in Guyville
- Natural Born Killers
- Nevermind
- In The Company of Men
- The Matrix
- Body Count
- The X-Files
- Dazed and Confused
- Star Wars: The Phantom Menace
- That 70s Show
- Kids
- Reservoir Dogs
- Ken Burns' Baseball
- ER
- American Beauty

== See also ==
Events discussed in the book:

- Columbine school shootings
- Gulf War
- Ross Perot 1992 presidential campaign
- Murder trial of O. J. Simpson
- 1996 Russian presidential election
- Waco siege
- Cloning of Dolly (sheep)
- 1994–95 Major League Baseball strike
- Rodney King riots
- Oklahoma City bombing
- Clinton–Lewinsky scandal
- Year 2000 problem
- Evander Holyfield vs. Mike Tyson II
- The Unabomber
- 9/11
- The Berlin Wall
- 2000 United States presidential election
- Indiewood
- Steroids era
- Mike Tyson
- Lance Armstrong
- Michael Jordan
- West Coast-East Coast rivalry
