= Chuck Klosterman =

American author and columnist (born 1972)

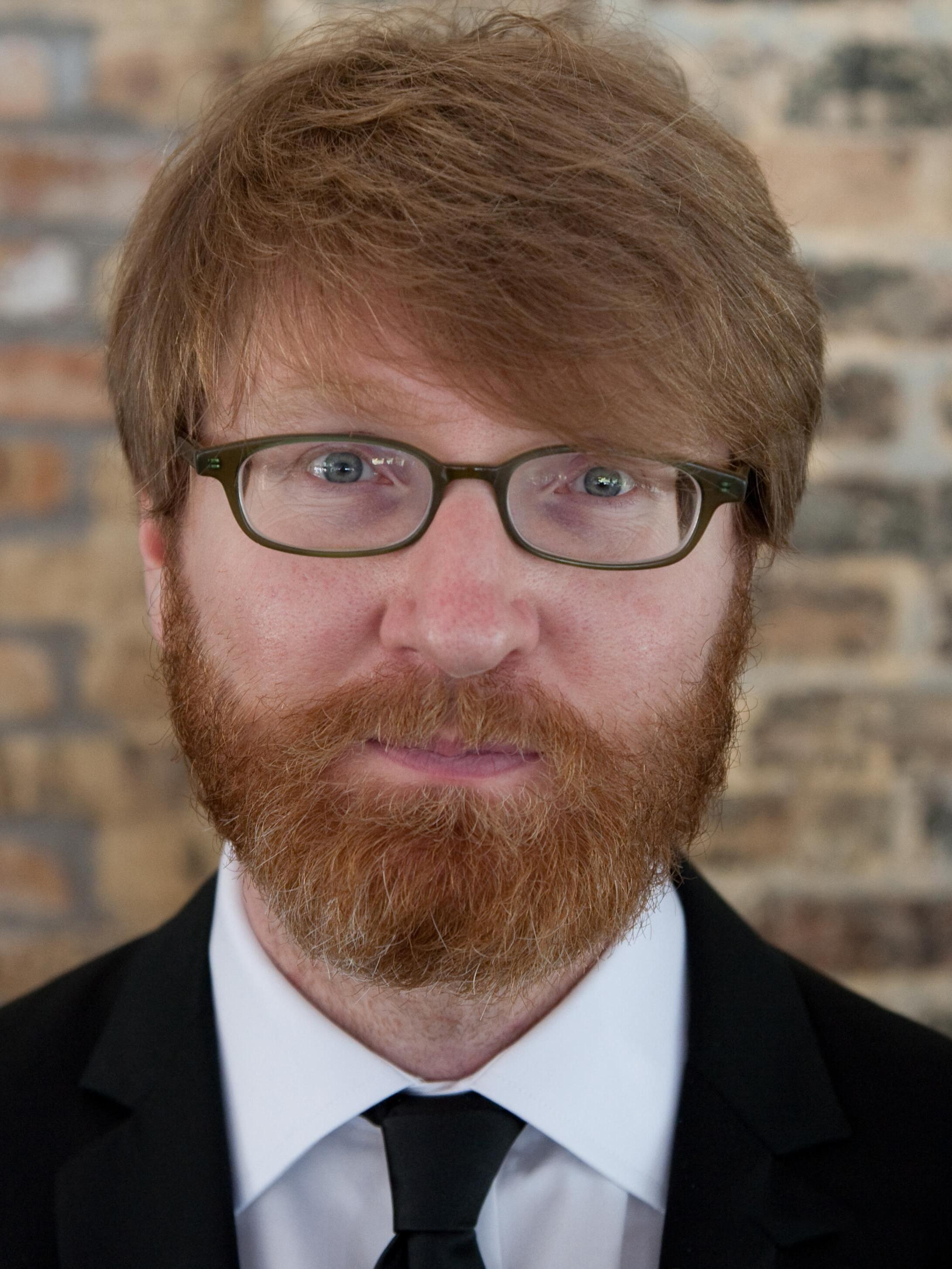
- Klosterman in 2009
- Born: Charles John Klosterman; June 5, 1972 (age 54); Breckenridge, Minnesota, U.S.
- Education: University of North Dakota (BA)
- Occupations: Author; journalist
- Spouse: Melissa Maerz (m. 2009)
- Children: 2
- Writing career
- Subjects: Popular culture; sports

Charles John Klosterman (/ˈkloʊstərmən/; born June 5, 1972) is an American author and essayist known for his writings on American popular culture, particularly rock music and sports. He has been a columnist for Esquire and ESPN.com and wrote "The Ethicist" column for The New York Times Magazine. Klosterman is the author of 14 books, including two novels and the essay collection Sex, Drugs, and Cocoa Puffs: A Low Culture Manifesto. He was awarded the ASCAP Deems Taylor award for music criticism in 2002.

== Early life ==
Klosterman was born in Breckenridge, Minnesota, the youngest of seven children of Florence and William Klosterman. He is of German and Polish descent. He grew up on a farm in nearby Wyndmere, North Dakota, and was raised Roman Catholic. He graduated from Wyndmere High School in 1990, and then from the University of North Dakota in 1994 with a Bachelor of Arts in journalism with a minor in English literature.

== Career ==
After college, Klosterman was a journalist in Fargo, North Dakota, and later a reporter and arts critic for the Akron Beacon Journal in Akron, Ohio, before moving to New York City in 2002. From 2002 to 2006, Klosterman was a senior writer and columnist for Spin. He has written for GQ, Esquire, The New York Times Magazine, The Believer, The Guardian, and The Washington Post. His magazine work has been anthologized in Da Capo Press's Best Music Writing, Best American Travel Writing, and The Best American Nonrequired Reading. Though initially recognized for his rock music writing, Klosterman has written extensively about sports and began contributing articles to ESPN's Page 2 on November 8, 2005.

In 2008, Klosterman spent the summer as the Picador Guest Professor for Literature at the Leipzig University's Institute for American Studies in Germany.

Klosterman was an original member of Grantland, a now-defunct sports and pop culture web site owned by ESPN and founded by Bill Simmons. Klosterman was a consulting editor. In 2020, he co-hosted a podcast titled "Music Exists" with Chris Ryan as part of The Ringer podcast network.

He also appeared as an animated version of himself in several episodes of the Adult Swim web feature Carl's Stone Cold Lock of the Century of the Week, to discuss the week's football games and to sometimes try to promote his latest book (Carl cuts him off each time). In one episode, Carl recites a list of facts and Klosterman asks "Is this, perhaps, from Wikipedia?"

In 2012, Klosterman appeared in the documentary Shut Up and Play the Hits about musical group LCD Soundsystem; Klosterman's extended interview with the group's frontman James Murphy "forms the...backbone of the film".

His eighth book, titled I Wear the Black Hat, was published in 2013. It focuses on the paradox of villainy within a heavily mediated culture.

In 2015, Klosterman appeared on episodes 6 and 7 of the first season of IFC show Documentary Now! as a music critic for the fictional band The Blue Jean Committee.

His best-selling ninth book, But What If We're Wrong? Thinking About the Present As If It Were the Past, was published June 7, 2016. It visualizes the contemporary world as it will appear in the future to those who will perceive it as the distant past.

In 2021, Klosterman appeared on the podcast Storybound, backed by an original Storybound remix with Portico Quartet.

His twelfth book, The Nineties, debuted at No. 2 on the New York Times nonfiction bestseller list on February 27, 2022. His thirteenth book, Football, debuted at No. 2 on the New York Times nonfiction bestseller list on February 8, 2026.

== Personal life ==
In 2009, Klosterman married journalist Melissa Maerz. They have two children.

== Books ==
Klosterman is the author of 14 books and two sets of cards.

=== Non-fiction ===
- Fargo Rock City: A Heavy Metal Odyssey in Rural Nörth Daköta (2001), a humorous memoir/history on the phenomenon of glam metal
- Killing Yourself to Live: 85% of a True Story (2005), a road narrative focused on the relationship between rock music, mortality, and romantic love
- I Wear the Black Hat: Grappling with Villains (Real and Imagined) (2013)
- But What If We're Wrong? Thinking About the Present As If It Were the Past (2016)
- The Nineties (2022)
- Football (2026)

=== Essay collections ===
- Sex, Drugs, and Cocoa Puffs: A Low Culture Manifesto (2003), a best-selling collection of original pop culture essays
- Chuck Klosterman IV: A Decade of Curious People and Dangerous Ideas (2006), a collection of articles, previously published columns, and a semi-autobiographical novella
- Eating the Dinosaur (2009), an original collection of essays on media, technology, celebrity, and perception
- Chuck Klosterman X: A Highly Specific, Defiantly Incomplete History of the Early 21st Century (2017), a collection of previously published essays and features

=== Fiction ===
- Downtown Owl: A Novel (2008), a novel describing life in the fictional town of Owl, North Dakota
- The Visible Man: A Novel (2011), a novel about a man who uses a cloaking device to observe others
- Raised in Captivity (2019), a collection of 34 essayistic short stories, described as "fictional nonfiction"
- Rock*: A Mainstream Alternative History of Alternative Mainstream Music (2026)

=== Card sets ===
- HYPERtheticals: 50 Questions for Insane Conversations (2010), a set of 50 cards featuring hypothetical questions
- SUPERtheticals: 50 Questions for Strange Conversations (2020), another set of 50 cards featuring hypothetical questions
