= Advanced Genius Theory =

2010 non-fiction book by Jason Hartley

The Advanced Genius Theory
- Author: Jason Hartley
- Cover artist: Carla Jane Jones
- Language: English
- Subject: Music journalism
- Publisher: Scribner
- Publication date: 2010
- Publication place: United States
- Media type: Print
- Pages: 288
- ISBN: 978-1-4391-0236-7

The Advanced Genius Theory: Are They Out of Their Minds or Ahead of Their Time? is a 2010 U.S. nonfiction book by journalist Jason Hartley. It posits an explanation as to why well-established musicians are now perceived as terrible or having "lost it". Merely, these artists or celebrities have "Advanced" past our understanding, because they are true geniuses. The book also mentions athletes, actors, writers and even sportscasters as possibly being Advanced.

== Background ==
The Theory, developed by Jason Hartley and Britt Bergman, maintains that seemingly bad and confusing artists are actually still producing excellent works today, despite critic and fan belief. The hypothesis is based around a few key musicians (only individuals), namely Bob Dylan, Sting, David Bowie, and (most-critically) Lou Reed. At one time, these musicians wore sunglasses, leather jackets and mullets when it was un-ironic to do so. Musical artists must at least have a self-portrait on one of their album covers, displaying their sunglasses or hairstyle (e.g. Street Hassle, Infidels, Aladdin Sane). The basic tenets are:

1. You must have done great work for more than 15 years.
2. You must have alienated your original fans.
3. You must be completely unironic.
4. You must be unpredictable.
5. You must "lose it". Spectacularly.

Many other rules exist, but constantly evolve. For instance, there is a correlation between the Advanced and comic book superhero Batman (e.g. "Batdance", Val Kilmer, Orson Welles' cape), but it has not been fully proven.

The term "Overt" is used to describe those quasi-Advanced (or approaching Advancement), but those too outlandish or ironic to be considered Advanced. Examples including Brian Wilson's "beached whale" era, Bono's MacPhisto character, and Kurt Cobain's collaboration with William S. Burroughs.

"If a band is overt, they appear Advanced. However, they are actually the opposite of Advanced, because their seemingly inexplicable decisions are driven by guile."

== Critical reception ==
Response to the Theory has been mixed. Rob Sheffield of Rolling Stone states the debate is "...just a way for Advancement proponents to appreciate shitty music by people they consider to be nonshitty. It allows you to engage with Lou Reed's music from the 1980s, but not the Hooters or the Outfield. This entire theory is shackled by a Heisenbergian principle of self-consciousness." However, Sheffield himself participated in a Brooklyn Panel discussing the book, where it was evident that his position was not so clear-cut. And, as Chuck Klosterman states in the book's intro: "Part of what makes Advancement Theory so entertaining (at least to me) is the way it outrages so many uncreative music critics, almost all of whom (a) begin by dismissing it completely before (b) spending the next twenty minutes manically fixating on why no one should ever talk about it, even in jest." The book's review in Publishers Weekly states that, "though it [the theory] should ignite many debates over whether your current favorite is Overt or Advanced, it also shows that in either case, there's more pleasure to be found when one keeps an open mind."
