= Football (book) =

2026 non-fiction book by Chuck Klosterman

- Author: Chuck Klosterman
- Language: English
- Subject: American football, American culture
- Genre: Non-fiction, cultural criticism
- Publisher: Penguin Press
- Publication date: January 20, 2026
- Publication place: United States
- Media type: Print (hardcover), e-book, audiobook
- Pages: 304
- ISBN: 978-0-593-49064-8
- Dewey Decimal: 796.332

Football is a 2026 non-fiction book by American cultural critic Chuck Klosterman.

== Summary ==
Published by Penguin Press on January 20, 2026, the book examines the cultural significance of American football in the United States, analyzing its dominance in television viewership, its structural and philosophical underpinnings, and its potential future decline.

== Background ==
Klosterman, a lifelong football fan who played the sport in his youth, frames football as a "hyperobject" a phenomenon so vast and complex that its true dimensions are hidden in plain sight. He notes that in 2023, 93 of the 100 most-watched programs on U.S. television were NFL games, arguing that this dominance makes football essential to understanding American society from 1950 to the present.

The book is structured as a series of essays rather than a linear history. Topics include the 1958 NFL Championship Game as the origin of football's television dominance, the question of the sport's greatest player (with Klosterman arguing for Jim Thorpe), the archetype of the uncompromising head coach, the relationship between football and race, the rise of fantasy leagues and gambling, and the sport's "perfect marriage" with television as a medium.

Klosterman describes football as "the best television product ever produced," arguing that the sport's intermittent structure—brief bursts of intense action separated by pauses—creates an ideal viewing experience that allows for conversation, reflection, and sustained engagement.

=== Prediction of decline ===
A central thesis of the book, which received significant attention in reviews, is Klosterman's prediction that football will eventually lose its cultural centrality within roughly 60 to 70 years. He compares football's trajectory to that of horse racing, which was once broadly popular in America but receded as people lost their everyday connection to horses.

Klosterman cites several factors that he believes will contribute to football's decline: diminishing youth participation due to fears over head injuries; the rising cost of broadcast rights leading advertisers to reconsider the value of television advertising; and changes in college football—including the dissolution of traditional conferences, the transfer portal, and NIL payments—that have made the college game indistinguishable from the professional version, eroding the local, grass-roots connections that sustained fan interest.

Klosterman acknowledges that his prediction may be wrong, stating in interviews: "The best argument is that this hasn't happened with anything else in the history of the world. Nothing has remained this popular forever."

== Publication and reception ==
Football was published on January 20, 2026, and received generally positive reviews. Critics praised Klosterman's analytical approach and his ability to blend personal observation with cultural criticism. Dwight Garner of The New York Times called Klosterman "a dorm-room philosopher and, on pop topics, the overthinker's overthinker," describing the book as "a smart, rewarding consideration of football's popularity and eventual downfall." John Hirschauer in City Journal wrote that the book is "a must-read for football obsessives who want to understand why they love the game and for outsiders who want to know what they're missing."

Publishers Weekly described the book as "eye-opening and entertaining," noting that Klosterman "sheds light on football's 'outsized and underrated' role in shaping contemporary culture" and calling it "a transcendent appraisal of America's favorite sport." Kirkus Reviews praised the book as "a beloved sport's eventual death spiral has seldom been so entertaining," adding that "a smart, rewarding consideration of football's popularity—and eventual downfall." On NPR's All Things Considered, Klosterman discussed the book with host Juana Summers, emphasizing that despite the sport's problems, he still considers football "a net positive" for American society, "but it's close."
