= I Wear the Black Hat =

2013 book by Chuck Klosterman

I Wear the Black Hat: Grappling with Villains (Real and Imagined)
- The first edition cover
- Author: Chuck Klosterman
- Language: English
- Subject: Pop culture
- Publisher: Scribner
- Publication date: July 9, 2013
- Publication place: United States
- Media type: Print (hardcover and paperback)
- Pages: 242
- ISBN: 978-1-4391-8449-3
- OCLC: 886390536
- LC Class: 2013003049
- Preceded by: The Visible Man (2011)
- Followed by: What If We're Wrong: Thinking About the Present As If It Were the Past (2016)

I Wear the Black Hat: Grappling with Villains (Real and Imagined) is a book written by Chuck Klosterman, first published by Scribner in 2013. It is a collection of twelve essays examining the nature of villainy through the lens of popular culture, rock music, and sports. It is the eighth book released by Klosterman. The book debuted at number 5 on the New York Times bestseller list.

== Overview ==
I Wear the Black Hat investigates the thesis: A villain is someone who knows the most but cares the least. The book explores how villains behave and why, and many of the essays surround famous athletes and musicians

== Essays ==
I Wear the Black Hat consists of twelve essays:

- What You Say About His Company Is What You Say About Society: a short history of Niccolò Machiavelli, the term "Machiavellian", and the Penn State child sex abuse scandal.
- Another Thing That Interests Me About the Eagles Is That I [Am Contractually Obligated to] Hate Them: an examination of the Eagles song "Take It Easy" and the reasons why certain music and musicians are hated.
- Villains Who Are Not Villains: a discussion of whether a person's actions or rather the circumstances under which they act make them a villain. Keith Richards, D. B. Cooper, Morris Day, Muhammad Ali and others are discussed.
- Easier Than Typing: Klosterman recounts the story of Bernhard Goetz, who is compared and contrasted to Batman.
- Human Clay: a commentary on the popularity of Andrew Dice Clay.
- Without a Gun They Can't Get None: an analysis of N.W.A, their debut album Straight Outta Compton, and why they became so closely associated with the Los Angeles Raiders.
- Arrested for Smoking: an examination of the Lewinsky scandal as a five-sided problem that included Bill Clinton, Monica Lewinsky, Kenneth Starr, Linda Tripp and Hillary Clinton.
- Electric Funeral: an exploration of Perez Hilton, Kim Dotcom and Julian Assange.
- "I Am Perplexed" [This Is Why, This Is Why They Hate You]: a serial consideration of Fred Durst, Chevy Chase, Howard Cosell, and Aleister Crowley.
- Crime and Punishment (or the Lack Thereof): a comparison of O. J. Simpson and Kareem Abdul-Jabbar.
- Hitler Is in the Book: an analysis of how evil Adolf Hitler was, seen through the lens of Bob Dylan's song "With God on Our Side".
- The Problem of Overrated Ideas: Klosterman discusses steroids in baseball and recounts the circumstances by which he came to hate Rick Helling—the first player in Major League Baseball to take a stance against performance-enhancing drugs in 1998.

== Reception ==
The book received mixed reviews, with The A.V. Club giving it a B−. Writing for the New York Times, James Parker said I Wear the Black Hat is, "...not [Klosterman's] best book, but in considering it we should remember the young person, probably not a reader of The New York Times, to whom its haphazardness, its occasional pointlessness and above all its difficulty keeping a straight face will come as sweet, sweet relief." Publishers Weekly wrote of Klosterman, "His circuitous arguments are occasionally self-indulgent and too reminiscent of David Foster Wallace, but the writing is always intellectually vigorous and entertaining." Michael Robbins said in his review of the book in the Chicago Tribune that, "What's most frustrating about "I Wear the Black Hat" is that I'd love to read a good version of it."
