= Sex, Drugs, and Cocoa Puffs =

Book by Chuck Klosterman

Sex, Drugs, and Cocoa Puffs: A Low Culture Manifesto
- 2004 paperback edition cover
- Author: Chuck Klosterman
- Language: English
- Subject: Popular culture
- Publisher: Scribner
- Publication date: August 26, 2003
- Publication place: United States
- Media type: Print (hardcover and paperback)
- Pages: 256
- ISBN: 0-7432-3600-9
- OCLC: 55756891
- Dewey Decimal: 306/.0973 21
- LC Class: E169.12 .K56 2003
- Preceded by: Fargo Rock City
- Followed by: Killing Yourself to Live: 85% of a True Story

Sex, Drugs, and Cocoa Puffs: A Low Culture Manifesto is a book written by Chuck Klosterman, first published by Scribner in 2003. It is a collection of eighteen comedic essays on popular culture.

The book cover was designed by Paul Sahre.

== Overview ==
Klosterman presents his essays as if they were tracks on a CD. Between each essay, or track, is an "interlude"—a short, entertaining blurb linking the essays. The following essays are included in Sex, Drugs, and Cocoa Puffs:

1. This Is Emo: Klosterman recounts "fake love" we are conditioned to pursue, and the false, unbalanced nature of When Harry Met Sally....
2. Billy Sim: Klosterman describes his experience with the reality-mimicking video game The Sims and how The Sims illustrates that "even eternally free people are enslaved by the process of living."
3. What Happens When People Stop Being Polite: The impacts of MTV's The Real World and how it led to the development of one-dimensional personalities.
4. Every Dog Must Have His Every Day, Every Drunk Must Have His Drink: An ode to Billy Joel, particularly the universality of his album Glass Houses.
5. Appetite for Replication: Klosterman interviews and spends a few days with the members of a Guns N' Roses tribute band, "Paradise City," and outlines the significance of tribute bands.
6. Ten Seconds to Love: An analysis of how American culture is upset with the unrealistic images of success it has created, as stemming from a discussion of the Pamela-Tommy sex tape.
7. George Will vs. Nick Hornby: A rant against soccer (particularly among youth), claiming it supports outcast culture.
8. 33: Klosterman explains how the 1980s rivalry between the Los Angeles Lakers and the Boston Celtics symbolizes all rivalries in life, including politics, religion, and race.
9. Porn: An explanation of how the Internet has proliferated the porn industry, as for the need of the presence of the amateur and celebrity in our lives.
10. The Lady or the Tiger: A brief history of the cereal industry, and how Kelloggs was begun as a religious company, but now is a microcosm for coolness. The "Cocoa Puffs" in the title comes from this essay.
11. Being Zack Morris: An analysis of Saved by the Bell and how "important things are inevitably cliché."
12. Sulking with Lisa Loeb on the Ice Planet Hoth: Why Star Wars is so overrated, and how it has come to represent basic morality.
13. The Awe-Inspiring Beauty of Tom Cruise's Shattered, Troll-like Face: A discussion of the question "What is reality?" as answered by movies such as Vanilla Sky, The Matrix, Memento, and Waking Life.
14. Toby over Moby: How the Dixie Chicks are the new Van Halen, as they are one of the only pop bands with musical quality, and how Van Halen's teenage boys have been replaced by the Dixie Chicks' teenage girls. Also how music taste is used to gauge coolness, and those who ignorantly say they like all kinds "except country" only say so to appear cool.
15. This is Zodiac Speaking: A description of three people Klosterman has interviewed who have known or met serial killers, and an exploration of "What does it mean to know a serial killer?"
16. All I Know Is What I Read in the Papers: Most of the media's bias is accidental, and stories are mainly developed by circumstance and by the interviewee who calls the journalist back first. Also how sports reporters hate sports, and how newspapers are designed for those who cannot read.
17. I, Rock Chump: Klosterman narrates his visit to the 2002 Pop Music Studies Conference by the Experience Music Project, and how it was largely an experience without rock and roll.
18. How to Disappear Completely and Never Be Found: A commentary on the Left Behind Series and the lifestyle of Evangelical Christians. The chapter title refers to the book How to Disappear Completely and Never Be Found by Doug Richmond and possibly the song "How To Disappear Completely" by Radiohead.

== Reception ==
Sex, Drugs, and Cocoa Puffs was positively reviewed by critics. Critic Mark Greif in The Guardian called it "one of the better essay collections of recent years," noting "Klosterman has attained cult status, his books joining the select and successful canon of reading for people who do not read." The A.V. Club declared Sex, Drugs, and Cocoa Puffs "one of the brightest pieces of pop analysis to appear this century."

== See also ==
- Low culture
- Reality television
