= List of top 10 singles for 2009 in Australia =

This is a list of singles that charted in the top ten of the ARIA Charts in 2009.

== Top-ten singles ==
Key

| Symbol | Meaning |
|---|---|
| ◁ | Indicates single's top 10 entry was also its ARIA top 50 debut |
| (#) | 2009 Year-end top 10 single position and rank |

List of ARIA top ten singles that peaked in 2009
| Top ten entry date | Single | Artist(s) | Peak | Peak date | Weeks in top ten | References |
Singles from 2008
| 10 November | "Use Somebody" | Kings of Leon | 2 | 5 January | 13 | |
| 8 December | "Single Ladies (Put a Ring on It)" | Beyoncé | 5 | 5 January | 8 | |
| 21 December | "Get Shaky" | The Ian Carey Project | 2 | 26 January | 13 | |
Singles from 2009
| 5 January | "Burn" | Jessica Mauboy | 1 | 19 January | 7 | |
| 12 January | "Alive" | Natalie Bassingthwaighte | 8 | 12 January | 1 | |
| 12 January | "Let It Rock" | Kevin Rudolf featuring Lil Wayne | 3 | 19 January | 7 | |
| 19 January | "Someday Soon" ◁ | Natalie Bassingthwaighte | 7 | 26 January | 8 | |
| 19 January | "You Found Me" | The Fray | 1 | 26 January | 11 | |
| 2 February | "My Life Would Suck Without You" | Kelly Clarkson | 5 | 16 February | 8 | |
| 2 February | "Love Story" (#3) | Taylor Swift | 1 | 23 March | 17 | |
| 9 February | "Gives You Hell" | The All American Rejects | 3 | 16 February | 11 | |
| 9 February | "Walking on a Dream" | Empire of the Sun | 10 | 8 February | 1 | |
| 16 February | "Everybody's Free (To Feel Good)" | Global Deejays featuring Rozalla | 7 | 16 February | 1 | |
| 16 February | "The Fear" | Lily Allen | 3 | 16 March | 8 | |
| 23 February | "Right Round" (#5) ◁ | Flo Rida featuring Kesha | 1 | 23 February | 12 | |
| 2 March | "Halo" (#7) | Beyoncé | 3 | 9 March | 11 | |
| 2 March | "Jizz in My Pants" | The Lonely Island | 10 | 9 March | 1 | |
| 9 March | "Rock and Roll" | Eric Hutchinson | 9 | 16 March | 3 | |
| 16 March | "Dead and Gone" | T.I. featuring Justin Timberlake | 4 | 23 March | 7 | |
| 23 March | "Jai Ho! (You Are My Destiny)" ◁ | A. R. Rahman and The Pussycat Dolls | 1 | 27 April | 13 | |
| 30 March | "Love Sex Magic" ◁ | Ciara featuring Justin Timberlake | 5 | 6 April | 8 | |
| 30 March | "Hey Boys and Girls" | Evermore | 4 | 6 April | 6 | |
| 6 April | "Don't Trust Me" | 3OH!3 | 3 | 13 April | 8 | |
| 13 April | "Boom Boom Pow" (#4) | The Black Eyed Peas | 1 | 18 May | 16 | |
| 20 April | "My Delirium" | Ladyhawke | 8 | 20 April | 1 | |
| 27 April | "We Made You" | Eminem | 1 | 11 May | 8 | |
| 27 April | "LoveGame" | Lady Gaga | 4 | 11 May | 7 | |
| 11 May | "Breakeven" | The Script | 3 | 25 May | 7 | |
| 18 May | "Not Fair" | Lily Allen | 3 | 15 June | 9 | |
| 18 May | "The Climb" | Miley Cyrus | 5 | 15 June | 9 | |
| 25 May | "Bad Influence" | Pink | 6 | 15 June | 5 | |
| 1 June | "Her Diamonds" ◁ | Rob Thomas | 3 | 8 June | 5 | |
| 1 June | "New Divide" ◁ | Linkin Park | 3 | 13 July | 7 | |
| 8 June | "Riverside" | Sidney Samson | 10 | 8 June | 1 | |
| 15 June | "I Gotta Feeling" (#1) ◁ | The Black Eyed Peas | 1 | 29 June | 21 | |
| 15 June | "I Do Not Hook Up" | Kelly Clarkson | 9 | 15 June | 1 | |
| 22 June | "Paparazzi" | Lady Gaga | 2 | 6 July | 9 | |
| 22 June | "Because" ◁ | Jessica Mauboy | 9 | 22 June | 1 | |
| 22 June | "Hush Hush; Hush Hush" | The Pussycat Dolls | 10 | 22 June | 1 | |
| 29 June | "Chase That Feeling" | Hilltop Hoods | 8 | 29 June | 1 | |
| 29 June | "When Love Takes Over" | David Guetta featuring Kelly Rowland | 6 | 29 June | 5 | |
| 29 June | "You Belong with Me" | Taylor Swift | 5 | 29 June | 9 | |
| 6 July | "Thriller" ◁ | Michael Jackson | 3 (Note: Thriller had previously peaked at 4 on the Kent Music Report in 1984 but re-entered due to Michael Jackson’s death.) | 6 July | 2 | |
| 6 July | "Billie Jean" ◁ | Michael Jackson | 7 (Note: Billie Jean had previously peaked at 1 on the Kent Music Report in 1983 but re-entered due to Michael Jackson’s death.) | 6 July | 2 | |
| 6 July | "Man in the Mirror" ◁ | Michael Jackson | 8 (Note: Man in the Mirror had previously peaked at 39 on the Kent Music Report in 1988 but re-entered due to Michael Jackson’s death.) | 6 July | 1 | |
| 20 July | "Battlefield" | Jordin Sparks | 4 | 27 July | 7 | |
| 20 July | "Sweet Dreams" | Beyoncé | 2 | 3 August | 9 | |
| 27 July | "Sway, Sway Baby!" ◁ | Short Stack | 2 | 27 July | 1 | |
| 27 July | "The Last Day on Earth" (#10) | Kate Miller-Heidke | 3 | 17 August | 12 | |
| 27 July | "Funhouse" | Pink | 6 | 3 August | 4 | |
| 10 August | "Sexy Bitch" (#2) | David Guetta featuring Akon | 1 | 17 August | 16 | |
| 10 August | "Heavy Cross" | Gossip | 7 | 10 August | 4 | |
| 17 August | "Like It Like That" (#6) ◁ | Guy Sebastian | 1 | 7 September | 12 | |
| 24 August | "Evacuate the Dancefloor" | Cascada | 3 | 5 October | 9 | |
| 24 August | "Good Girls Go Bad" | Cobra Starship featuring Leighton Meester | 5 | 31 August | 9 | |
| 31 August | "The Boy Does Nothing" | Alesha Dixon | 8 | 14 September | 5 | |
| 31 August | "We Are Golden" | Mika | 10 | 31 August | 1 | |
| 7 September | "I Know You Want Me (Calle Ocho)" | Pitbull | 6 | 21 September | 8 | |
| 14 September | "Party in the U.S.A." | Miley Cyrus | 6 | 2 November | 6 | |
| 21 September | "Meet Me Halfway" (#8) | The Black Eyed Peas | 1 | 2 November | 14 | |
| 28 September | "Don't Stop Believin’" | Glee Cast | 5 | 28 September | 2 | |
| 5 October | "Run This Town" | Jay Z featuring Rihanna and Kanye West | 9 | 12 October | 2 | |
| 12 October | "Before the Worst" | The Script | 10 | 12 October | 1 | |
| 19 October | "3" | Britney Spears | 6 | 26 October | 7 | |
| 19 October | "Bodies" | Robbie Williams | 4 | 19 October | 2 | |
| 19 October | "This Is Who I Am" | Vanessa Amorosi | 1 | 19 October | 7 | |
| 2 November | "Tik Tok" (#9) | Kesha | 1 | 9 November | 16 | |
| 2 November | "Bulletproof" | La Roux | 5 | 2 November | 3 | |
| 2 November | "Down" ◁ | Jay Sean featuring Lil Wayne | 2 | 23 November | 12 | |
| 2 November | "Halo/Walking On Sunshine" | Glee Cast | 10 | 2 November | 1 | |
| 9 November | "Bad Romance" | Lady Gaga | 2 | 14 December | 14 | |
| 9 November | "Starstrukk" | 3OH!3 featuring Katy Perry | 4 | 23 November | 10 | |
| 23 November | "Russian Roulette" | Rihanna | 7 | 23 November | 3 | |
| 30 November | "Black Box" ◁ | Stan Walker | 2 | 30 November | 9 | |
| 30 November | "Empire State of Mind" | Jay Z featuring Alicia Keys | 4 | 14 December | 12 | |
| 7 December | "According to You" | Orianthi | 8 | 7 December | 2 | |
| 7 December | "Art of Love" | Guy Sebastian featuring Jordin Sparks | 8 | 14 December | 5 | |
| 21 December | "Sweet December" ◁ | Short Stack | 8 | 21 December | 1 | |

=== 1991 peaks ===
List of ARIA top ten singles in 2009 that peaked in 1991
| Top ten entry date | Single | Artist(s) | Peak | Peak date | Weeks in top ten | References |
|---|---|---|---|---|---|---|
| 11 November | "Black or White" ◁ | Michael Jackson | 1 | 25 November | 15 | |

=== 2008 peaks ===
List of ARIA top ten singles in 2009 that peaked in 2008
| Top ten entry date | Single | Artist(s) | Peak | Peak date | Weeks in top ten | References |
|---|---|---|---|---|---|---|
| 15 September | "Hot n Cold" | Katy Perry | 4 | 27 October | 13 | |
| 21 September | "Sex on Fire" | Kings of Leon | 1 | 20 October | 17 | |
| 3 November | "Poker Face" | Lady Gaga | 1 | 17 November | 16 | |
| 17 November | "Live Your Life" | T.I. featuring Rihanna | 3 | 15 December | 11 | |
| 1 December | "You" ◁ | Wes Carr | 1 | 15 December | 6 | |
| 15 December | "Circus" | Britney Spears | 6 | 22 December | 8 | |

=== 2010 peaks ===
List of ARIA top ten singles in 2009 that peaked in 2010
| Top ten entry date | Single | Artist(s) | Peak | Peak date | Weeks in top ten | References |
|---|---|---|---|---|---|---|
| 14 December | "Whatcha Say" | Jason Derulo | 5 | 4 January | 10 | |
| 21 December | "Fireflies" | Owl City | 1 | 4 January | 15 | |

== Entries by artist ==
The following table shows artists who achieved two or more top 10 entries in 2009, including songs that reached their peak in 2008 and 2010. The figures include both main artists and featured artists. The total number of weeks an artist spent in the top ten in 2009 is also shown.

| Entries | Artist | Weeks | Songs |
|---|---|---|---|
| 4 | Lady Gaga | 31 | "Bad Romance", "LoveGame", "Paparazzi", "Poker Face" |
| 4 | Michael Jackson | 2 | "Billie Jean", "Black or White", "Man in the Mirror", "Thriller" |
| 3 | Beyoncé | 24 | "Halo", "Single Ladies (Put a Ring on It)", "Sweet Dreams" |
| 3 | The Black Eyed Peas | 35 | "Boom Boom Pow", "I Gotta Feeling", "Meet Me Halfway" |
| 3 | Rihanna | 9 | "Live Your Life", "Run This Town", "Russian Roulette" |
| 2 | 3OH!3 | 16 | "Don't Trust Me", "Starstrukk" |
| 2 | Britney Spears | 12 | "3", "Circus" |
| 2 | David Guetta | 21 | "Sexy Bitch", "When Love Takes Over" |
| 2 | Glee Cast | 3 | "Don't Stop Believin'", "Halo/Walking On Sunshine" |
| 2 | Guy Sebastian | 16 | "Art of Love", "Like It Like That" |
| 2 | Jay Z | 7 | "Empire State of Mind", "Run This Town" |
| 2 | Jessica Mauboy | 8 | "Because", "Burn" |
| 2 | Jordin Sparks | 11 | "Art of Love", "Battlefield" |
| 2 | Justin Timberlake | 10 | "Dead and Gone", "Love Sex Magic" |
| 2 | Katy Perry | 9 | "Hot n Cold", "Starstrukk" |
| 2 | Kelly Clarkson | 9 | "I Do Not Hook Up", "My Life Would Suck Without You" |
| 2 | Kesha | 21 | "Right Round", "Tik Tok" |
| 2 | Kings of Leon | 5 | "Sex on Fire", "Use Somebody" |
| 2 | Lil Wayne | 16 | "Down", "Let It Rock" |
| 2 | Lily Allen | 17 | "Not Fair", "The Fear" |
| 2 | Miley Cyrus | 15 | "Party in the U.S.A.", "The Climb" |
| 2 | Natalie Bassingthwaighte | 9 | "Alive", "Someday Soon" |
| 2 | Pink | 9 | "Bad Influence", "Funhouse" |
| 2 | The Pussycat Dolls | 14 | "Hush Hush; Hush Hush", "Jai Ho! (You Are My Destiny)" |
| 2 | The Script | 8 | "Before the Worst", "Breakeven" |
| 2 | Short Stack | 2 | "Sway, Sway Baby!", "Sweet December" |
| 2 | Taylor Swift | 26 | "Love Story", "You Belong with Me" |
| 2 | T.I. | 11 | "Dead and Gone", "Live Your Life" |

== See also ==
- List of number-one singles of 2009 (Australia)
- List of Top 25 singles for 2009 in Australia
