= 1000 Stars =

Studio album by Natalie Bassingthwaighte
- Released: 20 February 2009
- Genre: Pop
- Length: 54:34
- Label: Sony
- Producer: Steve Anderson; Arnthor Birgisson; Chris Braide; Stuart Crichton; Forty4s; Andrew Frampton; Jimmy Harry; Cameron McGlinchey; Brian Paturalski; Brian Rawling; Alex Smith; Ina Wroldsen

Singles from 1000 Stars
- 1. "Alive" Released: 14 October 2008; 2. "Someday Soon" Released: 8 December 2008; 3. "1000 Stars" Released: 23 April 2009; 4. "Not for You" Released: 23 July 2009; 5. "Love Like This" Released: 29 January 2010

1000 Stars is the debut solo album by Australian singer and former Rogue Traders lead singer Natalie Bassingthwaighte. It was released through Sony Music Australia as a digital download on 20 February 2009, followed by a physical release on 21 February 2009. Upon its release, 1000 Stars debuted at number one on the ARIA Albums Chart and was certified gold by the Australian Recording Industry Association for shipments of more than 35,000 units. The album spawned two top-ten singles, "Alive" and "Someday Soon", which were both certified platinum.

== Background and release ==
In 2006, Bassingthwaighte had signed a recording contract with Sony Music Australia to embark on a solo career. She wrote and recorded 1000 Stars over three months in London, Los Angeles and Sweden with several songwriters and producers, including Paul Barry, Steve Anderson, Jimmy Harry and Ina Wroldsen, among others. The album was released digitally on 20 February 2009 and physically on 21 February 2009. The digital edition on iTunes includes the bonus track "Star".

== Singles ==
"Alive" was released on 14 October 2008 as the lead single from 1000 Stars. It peaked at number eight on the ARIA Singles Chart and was certified platinum by the Australian Recording Industry Association for sales exceeding 70,000 copies. The second single "Someday Soon" was released on 8 December 2008. Upon its release, "Someday Soon" peaked at number seven on the ARIA Singles Chart and spent eight consecutive weeks in the top ten. It was also certified platinum. The album's title track "1000 Stars" was released as the third single on 23 April 2009, and peaked at number 30.

"Not for You" was released as the fourth single from 1000 Stars on 23 July 2009, but failed to impact the charts. "Love Like This" was released on 29 January 2010 as the album's fifth and final single. It was released to raise awareness of the AIDS Council of New South Wales' "Wear It With Pride" campaign leading up to the 2010 Mardi Gras parade. All of the single's proceeds went towards the ongoing support of the LGBT community. Unlike the fourth single, "Love Like This" managed to chart at number 88 on the ARIA Singles Chart.

== Reception ==
Professional ratings
Review scores
Source	Rating
AllMusic	3/5 stars

For the issue dated 2 March 2009, 1000 Stars debuted at number one on the ARIA Albums Chart with first-week sales of 9,000 copies. In its second week, the album dropped to number four and sold 6,982 copies. It spent four consecutive weeks in the top ten and was certified gold by the Australian Recording Industry Association for shipments of more than 35,000 units.

== Track listing ==
1000 Stars track listing
No.	Title	Writer(s)	Producer(s)	Length
1.	"Catch Me If You Can"	Natalie Bassingthwaighte; Paul Barry; Alex Smith	Brian Rawling; Smith	3:34
2.	"Someday Soon"	Bassingthwaighte; Barry; Smith	Rawling; Smith	4:12
3.	"1000 Stars"	Chris Braide; Hattie Webb; Charlie Webb	Braide	4:00
4.	"Alive"	Bassingthwaighte; Arnthor Birgisson; Andrew Frampton	Frampton; Birgisson	3:31
5.	"Not for You"	Braide; Ina Wroldsen	Braide; Wroldsen	3:27
6.	"Feel the Flow"	Bassingthwaighte; Cameron McGlinchey	McGlinchey; Paturalski; Rawling^{[a]}	3:28
7.	"Could You Be Loved"	Caroline Lofts; Jez Ashurst	Braide	4:23
8.	"Supersensual"	Steve Anderson; Lisa Greene; Steve Lee	Anderson	3:43
9.	"Why Do I"	Bassingthwaighte; Stuart Critchton; Tommy Lee James	Critchton	3:52
10.	"Turn the Lights On"	Braide; Wroldsen	Braide; Wroldsen	4:17
11.	"This Can't Be Love"	Bassingthwaighte; Jimmy Harry	Harry	4:02
12.	"Superhuman"	Karen Poole; George Nakas; Klas Wahl	Forty4s	4:24
13.	"Love Like This"	Barry; Mark Taylor; Smith	Rawling; Smith	3:54
14.	"In His Eyes"	Bassingthwaighte; Jay Levine	Paturalski; McGlinchey	3:47
Total length:				54:34

Digital bonus track
No.	Title	Writer(s)	Length
15.	"Star"	Emily Friendship; Eg White	3:32
Total length:			58:06

Notes

- ^{^a} signifies an additional producer
- "Supersensual" incorporates elements of "Heart of Glass", written by Debbie Harry and Chris Stein.

== Credits and personnel ==
Adapted from the liner notes of 1000 Stars.

Locations

- Recorded at 3:20 Studios, Los Feliz; Chalice Studios, Los Angeles; Henson Studios, Los Angeles; Metrophonic Studios, UK; The Red Room Studio, Los Angeles; SCS Studios, Hastings; Studio 44, Stockholm, Sweden; Universal Music Publishing Studios, London; Untouchable Sound Studios, London
- Mixed at Air Studios; Bohus Sound Studios, Kungälv, Sweden; Metropolis Studios, London; The Red Room Studio, Los Angeles; The Strongrooms; Therapy Studio, London; Untouchable Sound Studios, London; The Vault Studios, Stockholm
- Mastered at Sterling Sound, New York City.

Vocal credits

- Paul Barry – backing vocals
- Natalie Bassingthwaighte – lead vocals, backing vocals
- Lisa Greene – backing vocals
- Cheryl Parker – backing vocals
- Karen Poole – backing vocals
- Ina Wroldsen – backing vocals

Creative credits

- Georges Antoni – photography
- Debaser (debaser.com.au) – artwork

Technical credits

- Steve Anderson – songwriter, producer, mixing, instruments
- Jez Ashurst – songwriter, original track programming
- Paul Barry – songwriter, piano
- Natalie Bassingthwaighte – songwriter
- Jesse Berent – guitar
- Arnthor Birgisson – songwriter, producer, mixing, programming
- Chris Braide – songwriter, producer, instruments
- Deyder Cintron – recording
- Pete Craigie – mixing
- Stuart Crichton – songwriter, producer, mixing, beats, keys, bass and programming
- Jake Davies – recording, mixing
- Forty4s – producers, recording
- Andrew Frampton – songwriter
- Matt Furmidge – mixing
- Lisa Greene – songwriter
- Jimmy Harry – songwriter, producer, recording, guitars, bass, keyboards
- Steve Lee – songwriter
- Tommy Lee James – songwriter
- Jay Levine – songwriter
- Tobias Lindell – mixing
- Caroline Lofts – songwriter
- Max Martin – guitars
- Cameron McGlinchey – songwriter, producer, drums, guitars, keys and programming
- Cameron McKenzie – guitars
- George Nakas – songwriter, bass, guitars, programming
- Adam Noble – mixing
- Esbjorn Ohrwall – guitars
- Brian Paturalski – producer, recording, mixing, keys and programming
- Karen Poole – songwriter
- Brian Rawling – producer, additional producer, additional mixing
- Alex Smith – songwriter, producer, recording, keys, guitars and programming
- Mark Taylor – songwriter, mixing, keys, guitars and programming
- Klas Wahl – songwriter, programming, keyboards
- Hattie Webb – songwriter
- Charlie Webb – songwriter
- Ben Wood – pro-tools editing, drums recording
- Ina Wroldsen – songwriter, producer
- Leon Zervos – mastering

== Charts ==
=== Weekly charts ===
Weekly chart performance for 1000 Stars
Chart (2009)	Peak position
Australian Albums (ARIA)	1

=== Year-end charts ===
Year-end chart performance for 1000 Stars
Chart (2009)	Rank
ARIA Albums Chart	57

== Certifications ==
Certifications for 1000 Stars
Region	Certification	Certified units/sales
Australia (ARIA)	Gold	35,000^{^}
^{^} Shipments figures based on certification alone.

== Release history ==
Release history and formats for 1000 Stars
Region	Date	Format	Label	Catalogue	Ref.
Australia	20 February 2009	Digital download	Sony Music Australia		
Australia	21 February 2009	CD	Sony Music Australia	88697461742	

== See also ==
- List of number-one albums of 2009 (Australia)
