= 1000 Stars (song) =

Single by Natalie Bassingthwaighte

from the album 1000 Stars
- Released: 23 April 2009
- Recorded: Untouchable Sound Studios (London)
- Genre: Pop
- Length: 3:59
- Label: Sony
- Songwriter(s): Chris Braide; Hattie Webb; Charlie Webb
- Producer(s): Chris Braide

Natalie Bassingthwaighte singles chronology
"Someday Soon" (2009)	"1000 Stars" (2009)	"Not for You" (2009)

"1000 Stars" is a song recorded by Australian singer and actress Natalie Bassingthwaighte. It was written by Chris Braide, Hattie Webb and Charlie Webb. "1000 Stars" was released on 23 April 2009 as the third single from Bassingthwaighte's debut solo album of the same name. Bassingthwaighte stated that the song is "all about that moment of falling in love, that moment of perfection". Upon its release, "1000 Stars" peaked at number 30 on the ARIA Singles Chart.

== Background and release ==
"1000 Stars" was written by Chris Braide, Hattie Webb and Charlie Webb for Natalie Bassingthwaighte's debut solo album of the same name. It was recorded live at Untouchable Sound Studios in London. Bassingthwaighte stated that the song is "all about that moment of falling in love, that moment of perfection". She then went on to say, "I remember going into the studio and singing it from it the beginning to end over and over again. I haven't sung like that since my musical theatre days. That's me there, no bells and whistles, no sound effects; it was me in the purest form just having a good sing."

"1000 Stars" was sent to Australian radio stations on 27 March 2009. It was then released as a digital extended play (EP) on 23 April 2009, which included the bonus tracks "Happiness" and "Supersensual". The EP was later released as a CD on 1 May 2009. "1000 Stars" debuted and peaked at number 30 on the ARIA Singles Chart on 11 May 2009. In its second, third and fourth weeks, the song dropped to numbers 31, 36 and 43, respectively.

== Promotion and cover versions ==
The music video for "1000 Stars" was directed by Gemma Lee and released onto Bassingthwaighte's official YouTube channel on 20 April 2009. Bassingthwaighte performed the song at the 51st TV Week Logie Awards on 3 May 2009.

The Webb Sisters, who co-wrote "1000 Stars" with Chris Braide, released their own version of the song on their 2009 EP The Other Side. It was later included on their third studio album Savages, released in 2010.

== Track listing ==
- CD single / Digital EP
1. "1000 Stars" (Single Edit) – 3:59
2. "Happiness" – 3:13
3. "Supersensual" (Denzel Park Remix) – 6:39
4. "1000 Stars" – 4:00

== Credits and personnel ==
Credits adapted from the liner notes of 1000 Stars.

Locations

- Recorded at Untouchable Sound Studios in London.
- Mixed at Air Studios.
- Mastered at Sterling Sound in New York City.

Personnel

- Songwriting – Chris Braide, Hattie Webb, Charlie Webb
- Production – Chris Braide
- Pro-Tools editing – Ben Wood
- Drums recording – Ben Wood
- All instruments (except drums) – Chris Braide
- Drums – Cameron McGlinchey
- Mixing – Adam Noble
- All vocals – Natalie Bassingthwaighte
- Mastering – Leon Zervos

== Charts ==
=== Weekly charts ===
Chart (2009)	Peak position
Australia (ARIA)	30

=== Year-end charts ===
Chart (2009)	Rank
ARIA Australian Artist Singles Chart	39

== Release history ==
Country	Date	Format	Label	Catalogue
Australia	23 April 2009	Digital EP	Sony Music Australia	
Australia	1 May 2009	CD	Sony Music Australia	88697520512
