= Christina Parie =

Australian singer (born 1996)

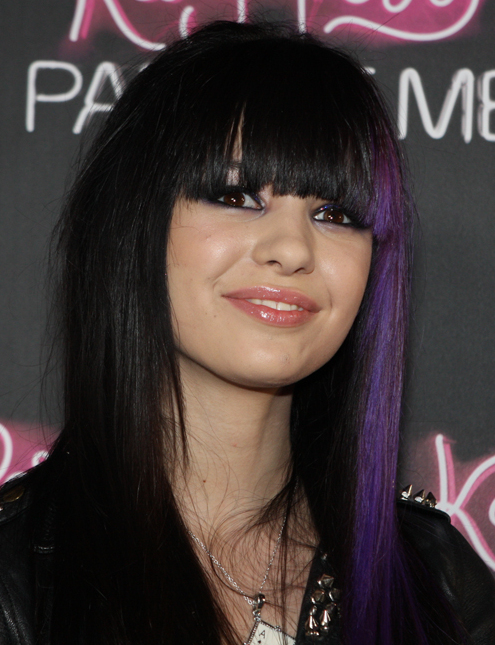
- Parie at the Katy Perry: Part of Me Australian premiere in June 2012

Background information
- Also known as: KYA, Christina Castle
- Born: Christina Parie Papoulias; 10 February 1996 (age 30); Sydney, New South Wales, Australia
- Origin: Castle Hill, New South Wales, Australia
- Genre: Pop rock
- Occupation: Singer
- Years active: 2011–present
- Label: Warner
- Website: kyaofficial.com

Christina Parie Papoulias (born 10 February 1996), also known by her stage names KYA and Christina Castle, is an Australian singer, best known as a contestant on the third season of The X Factor Australia in 2011. She subsequently signed with Warner Music Australia and released her debut single "16 & Unstoppable" in July 2012. Parie then changed her stage name to KYA, releasing a single titled "What I Live For" with LDN Noise in May 2014.

Parie was then dropped from Warner Music but continued singing and working whenever she could under the name Penny Lane to save enough money to then move to America. Christina continued working in America where she made a comeback in 2019 under the name Christina Castle releasing a 3-track EP titled Chapter 1. This EP included a raw and open Penny Lane of her past struggles, learning to cope with everything that was happening after X-Factor and losing her label as the leading single followed by a sexy "American Hustle" and an emotional "Hey Dad". Shortly after the release of this Christina came out with "Crazy Lover" ft Gangsta Boo, an anthem for all women who have been mistreated and believe in revenge.

== Early life ==
Christina Parie was born on 10 February 1996 to Jim and Mary Papoulias, and came from Castle Hill, New South Wales. Born as the middle child, Parie has an older sister, Alexa, and a younger brother, Jordan. She is the only member of her family that sings and has cited Avril Lavigne, Kelly Clarkson, Pink and The Cranberries as her musical influences. Parie originally started her music career as the lead singer of the five-piece band Losing Sight, who performed regularly at cafes, festivals and venues across Sydney. From grade eight to ten, she attended Mount St Benedict College in Pennant Hills, New South Wales. After finding it difficult to continue school in grade eleven due her time on The X Factor, Parie quit school to pursue her music career.

== Career ==
=== 2011: The X Factor Australia ===
Parie auditioned for the third season of The X Factor in 2011, singing Kelly Clarkson's "I Do Not Hook Up" in front of judges Ronan Keating, Guy Sebastian, Natalie Bassingthwaighte and Mel B. Keating described Parie's stage presence as "incredible" while Mel B said, "I'm surprised a record company hasn't tried to snap you up already." Sebastian commented, "you are complete, people in the record industry look for people like you." Parie progressed through to the bootcamp stage where she was placed into the Girls category, which was mentored by Mel B. After bootcamp, she progressed through to the home visits stage where the Girls travelled to Hollywood, California to perform in front of Mel B and guest judge Melanie C. During the last day of home visits, Mel B selected Parie, along with Tyla Bertolli and Jacqui Newland, for the live finals—a series of ten weekly live shows in which contestants are progressively eliminated by public vote.

In week seven of the live shows, she landed in the bottom two for the first time with Reece Mastin, following her rendition of David Guetta's "When Love Takes Over". Parie was eliminated after Keating, Sebastian and Bassingthwaighte chose to save Mastin. She was the last contestant from the Girls category to be eliminated. Coling Vickery of the Herald Sun called her elimination "one of the biggest shocks" of the season.

Episode	Song	Original Artist	Theme	Result
Auditions	"I Do Not Hook Up"	Kelly Clarkson	Free Choice	Through to Bootcamp
Bootcamp	"Dear Mr. President"	Pink	Free Choice	Through to Home visits
Bootcamp	"Rolling in the Deep"	Adele	Free Choice	Through to Home visits
Home visits	"What's Up?"	4 Non Blondes	Free Choice	Through to Live shows
Live show 1	"Since U Been Gone"	Kelly Clarkson	Judges' Choice	Safe
Live show 2	"Girls Just Want to Have Fun"	Cyndi Lauper	Party Anthems	Safe
Live show 3	"Gives You Hell"	The All-American Rejects	Rock	Safe
Live show 4	"Zombie"	The Cranberries	The 90s	Safe
Live show 5	"Teenage Dirtbag"	Wheatus"	Number-one Hits	Safe
Live show 6	"Weir"	Killing Heidi	Australian Hits	Safe
Live show 7	"When Love Takes Over"	David Guetta and Kelly Rowland	Dance	Bottom two
Live show 7 (bottom two)	"I'm with You"	Avril Lavigne	Free Choice	Eliminated

=== 2012–2013: 16 and Unstoppable ===
In January 2012, Parie and fellow X-Factor contestant Johnny Ruffo were supporting acts for Reece Mastin's first headlining Australian tour. In March 2012, she posted a cover of Simple Plan's "Jet Lag" on her YouTube page. The cover's success prompted the band to invite her to tour with them for a few shows in Australia alongside We the Kings.

While on tour, Parie contributed featured vocals to "Jet Lag". Shortly after, in June 2012, it was announced that Parie had signed a record deal with Warner Music Australia. Her debut single "16 & Unstoppable" was released digitally on 13 July 2012, which debuted and peaked at number 69 on the ARIA Singles Chart. A five-track extended play also titled 16 & Unstoppable was released on 27 July 2012. The EP's third track "Back to Life" was written by The Veronicas. Parie performed "16 & Unstoppable" at Nickelodeon Australia's first Slimefest concert on 15 September 2012.

=== 2014–2015: KYA ===
In May 2014, Parie announced that she changed her artist name to KYA (pronounced Khai-a) in honour of her grandmother. Her first single as KYA, "What I Live For", was released digitally on 2 May 2014, and peaked at number 65 on the ARIA Singles Chart. On 13 May 2015, it was announced that Parie was voted the singer of the national anthem at the 2015 A-League Grand Final. Parie, who received 54 percent of the vote, was one of three singers the public could vote for.

=== 2016–2018: Christina Castle, Little Bit Scared, Penny Lane ===
In 2016, Parie changed her artist name to Christina Castle. Parie was reportedly working on a new album with Linda Perry.

In 2017, Christina went on a US tour playing with Mikey Mike for Yelawolf's 47 date US/Canada tour.

In March 2018, Parie released her song Little Bit Scared.

In June, Castle appeared on season two of the Fox show, The Four. She auditioned with her own rendition of Ariana Grande's Side to Side. Later on in the year she let her fans know on Twitter that she is recording a new song titled Crazy Lover with Lido. Christina released a new single 'Penny Lane' on 15 September 2018.

=== 2019–present: Chapter 1, Crazy Lover & Vixen ===
Christina released her EP 'Chapter 1' on 25 January 2019. Christina released a new single with Gangsta Boo called 'Crazy Lover' on 19 April. 16 April 2020 Christina released a new single called 'Vixen' on the streaming platform 'Soundcloud'

== Discography ==
=== Christina Parie ===
==== Extended plays ====
Title	Album details
16 & Unstoppable	Released: 27 July 2012; Label: Warner Music Australia; Format: CD, digital download

==== Singles ====
Title	Year	Peak chart position	Album
Title	Year	AUS	Album
"16 & Unstoppable"	2012	69	16 & Unstoppable

==== Music videos ====
Title	Year	Director
"16 & Unstoppable"	2012	Sequoia

=== KYA ===
==== Singles ====
Title	Year	Peak chart position	Album
Title	Year	AUS	Album
"What I Live For" (with LDN Noise)	2014	65	—N/a

=== Christina Castle ===
Extended plays

Title	Album details
Chapter 1	Released: 25 January 2019; Self released; Format: digital download

==== Singles ====
Title	Year	Album
Penny Lane	2018	Chapter 1
Crazy Lover (feat.Gangsta Boo)	2019	Single
Vixen	2020	Single
Shark!	2021	Single
FFFree	2022	Single

==== Music videos ====
Title	Year
Little Bit Scared	2018
Shark!	2021
FFFree	2022
