= Love Like This =

Love Like This may refer to:

== Albums ==
- Love Like This (Ayiesha Woods album), 2008
- Love Like This (Collabro album), 2019
- Love Like This (The Summer Set album), 2009

== Songs ==
- "Love Like This" (Kennedy Rose song), 1990; also recorded by Carlene Carter in 1995
- "Love Like This" (Donell Jones song), 2010
- "Love Like This" (Faith Evans song), 1998
- "Love Like This" (Kodaline song), 2012
- "Love Like This" (Natalie Bassingthwaighte song), 2010
- "Love Like This" (Natasha Bedingfield song), 2007, featuring Sean Kingston
- "Love Like This" (Zayn song), 2023
- "Love Like This (Eternity)", a song by Jay Sean

== See also ==
- A Love Like This (disambiguation)
