= The X Factor (Australian TV series) season 3 =

Australian season of television series

The X Factor
- Season 3
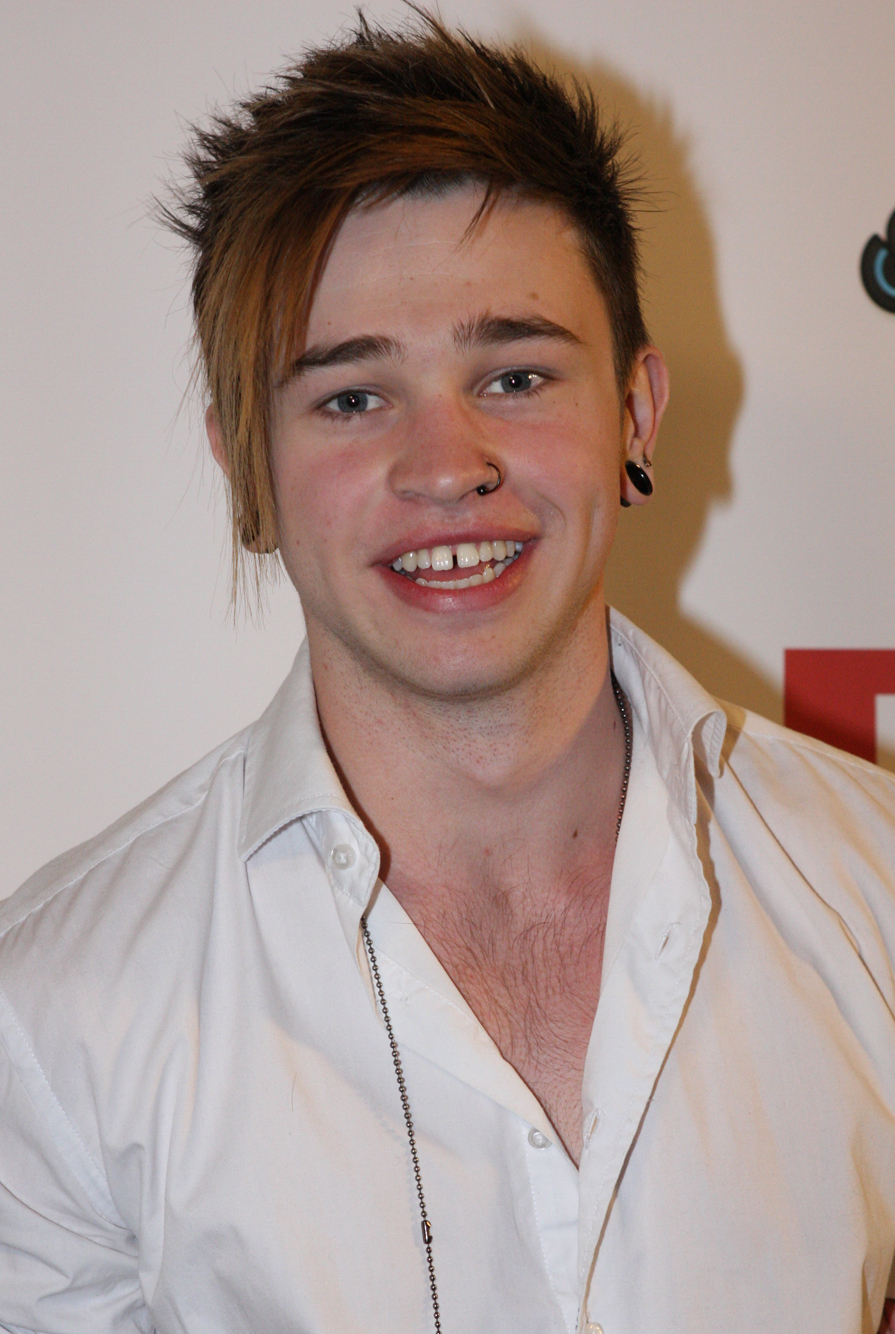
- Hosted by: Luke Jacobz
- Judges: Mel B; Guy Sebastian; Natalie Bassingthwaighte; Ronan Keating
- Winner: Reece Mastin
- Winning mentor: Guy Sebastian
- Runner-up: Andrew Wishart

Release
- Original network: Seven Network
- Original release: 29 August – 22 November 2011

Season chronology
- ← Previous; Season 2 Next → Season 4

The X Factor is an Australian television reality music competition, based on the original UK series, to find new singing talent; the winner of which received a management contract and a Sony Music Australia recording contract. The third season premiered on the Seven Network on 29 August 2011 and ended on 22 November 2011. The winner was Reece Mastin, his debut single "Good Night" was released after the final and it also made him the first contestant from the Boys category to come first. Mastin was mentored throughout by Guy Sebastian, who won as mentor for the first time. There was only a one percent difference in the votes between Mastin and runner-up Andrew Wishart. The season was presented by Luke Jacobz. Ronan Keating and Sebastian were the only judges from the previous season who returned, while Natalie Bassingthwaighte and Mel B joined the judging panel as replacements for former judges, Natalie Imbruglia and Kyle Sandilands.

The competition was split into several stages: auditions, bootcamp, home visits and live shows. Auditions in front of the show's producers took place throughout March and April 2011. The successful auditionees chosen by the producers were then invited back to the last set of auditions that took place in front of the judges and a live studio audience during May and June. After the auditions was bootcamp, where successful acts were split into four categories: Boys, Girls, Over 25s and Groups. Each judge was given a category to mentor and had to decide on their twelve acts after day two, and their six acts after day three. Special guest judges, including Wynter Gordon, Stephen Belafonte, Darren Hayes and The Veronicas, were brought in to help the judges decide their acts. Following bootcamp was the home visits stage, where each of the judges reduced their six acts to three, with help from more guest judges including Beyoncé, Melanie C, Jason Derulo, Good Charlotte and Leona Lewis. The live shows began on 19 September 2011.

The season 3 sparked controversy, namely Mel B's attitude towards the other judges, labeling them dishonest and boring. Controversy also occurred between Sebastian and contestant Mitchell Callaway; Sebastian took aim at Callaway's attitude to the competition following his performance on the third live performance show. There were also claims of a clash between Callaway and contestant Declan Sykes. The grand final decider was watched by 1.99 million people, making it the highest rated television episode of the season.

== Judges ==
Season 3 judges

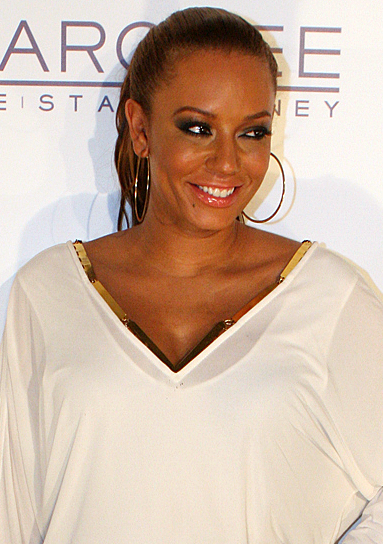
Mel B

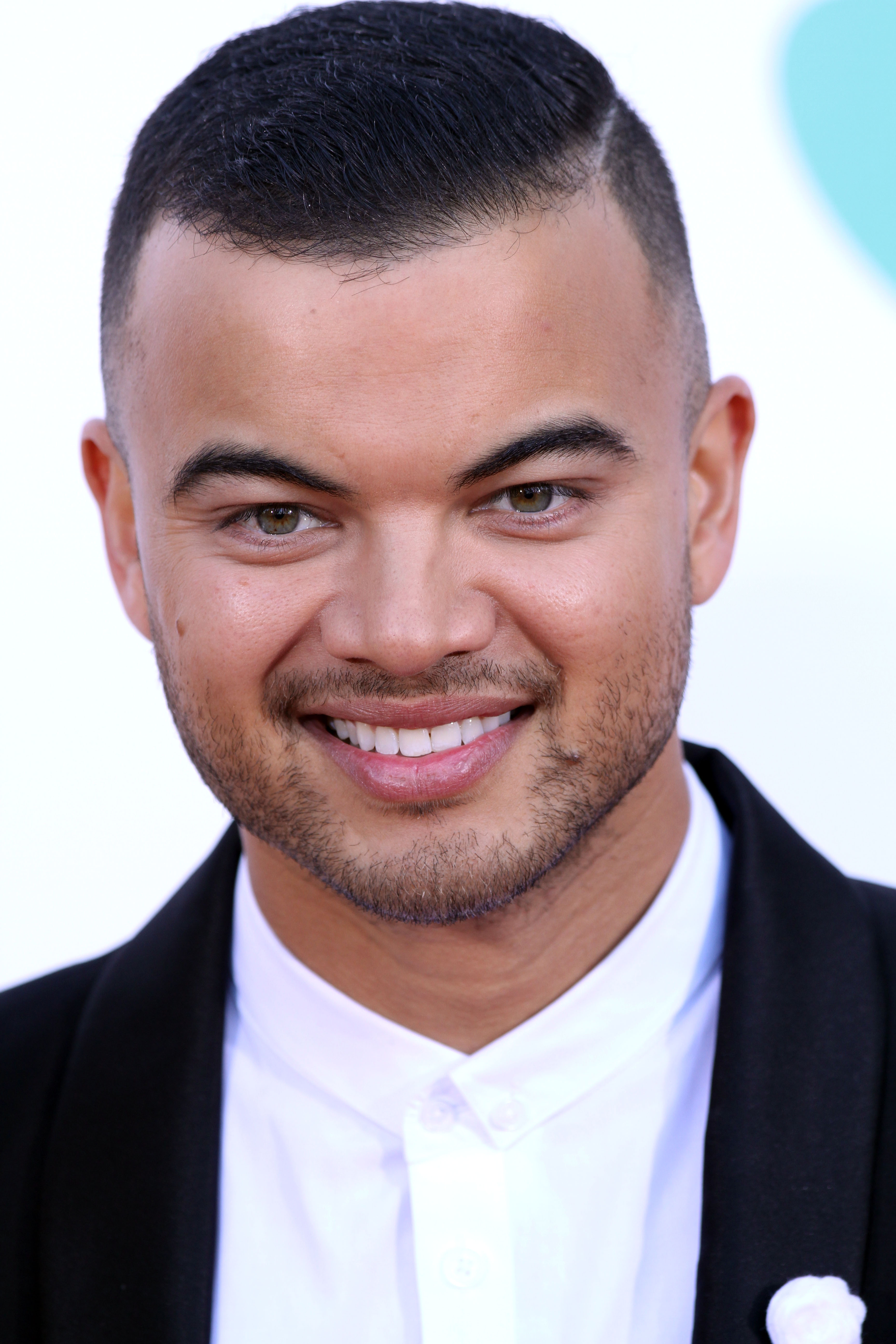
Guy Sebastian

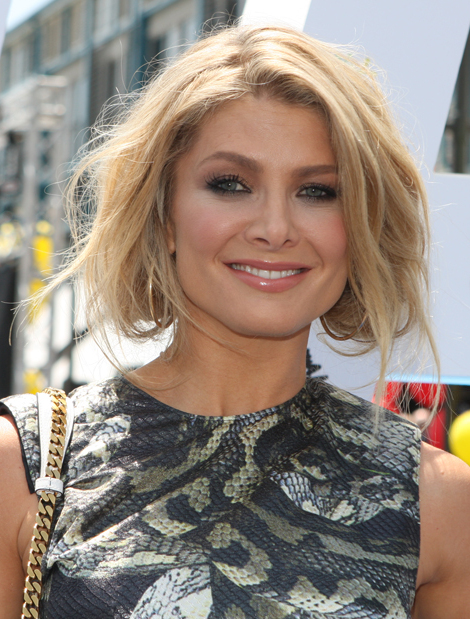
Natalie Bassingthwaighte

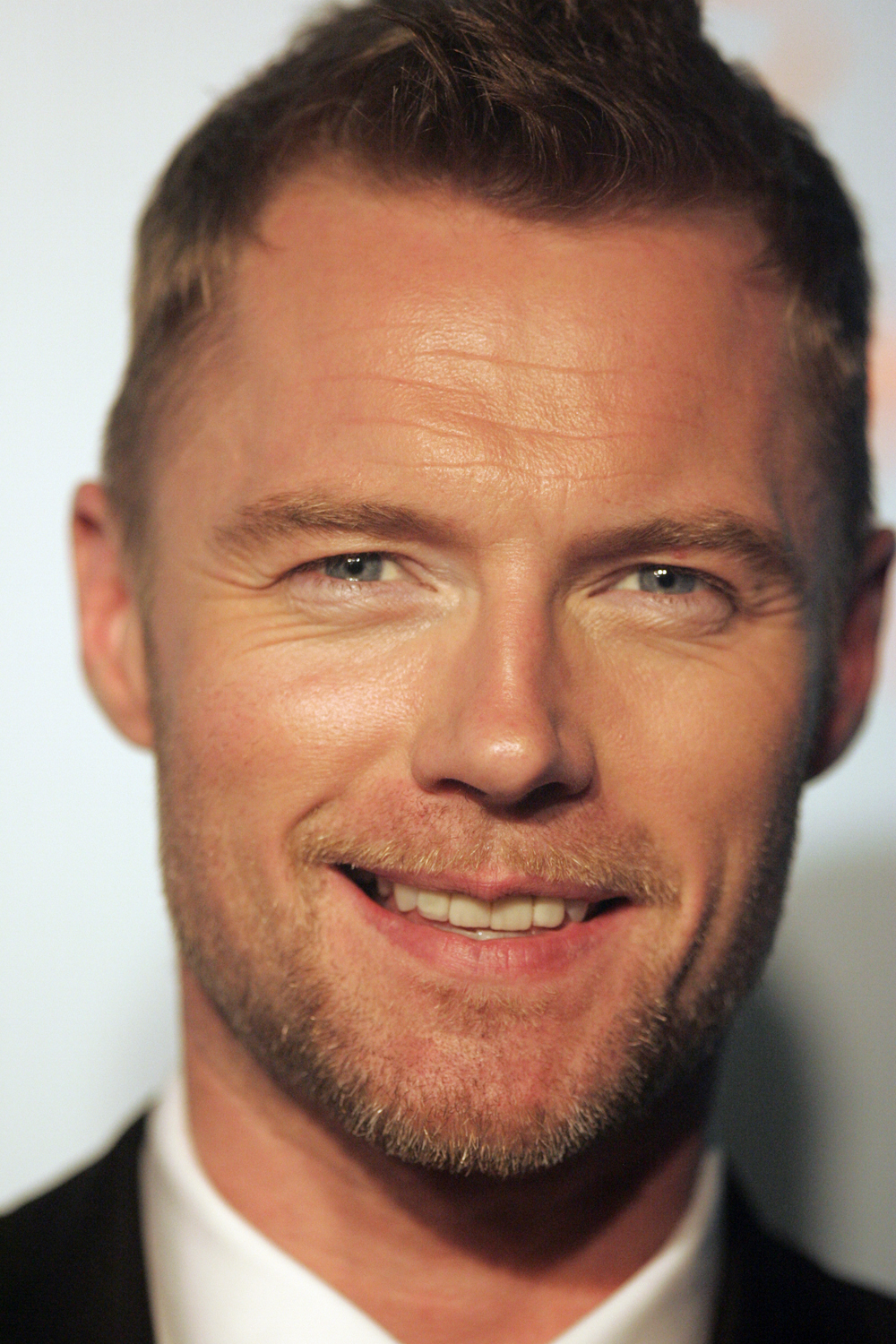
Ronan Keating

On 16 March 2011, judge Kyle Sandilands announced on his breakfast radio show, Kyle & Jackie O that he would not be returning to the judging panel for season 3. Of his decision, Sandilands said, "Not because I didn't like it. I thought the show was great and it was great fun to do but it's just too hectic, it's too much work. So, I've told Channel Seven, no." On 31 March 2011, it was announced that Natalie Bassingthwaighte would join the judging panel as a replacement for Natalie Imbruglia. When speaking of her role as a judge, Bassingthwaighte said she would focus on bringing an honest critique to the show and would guide "the artists through the competition". In late April 2011, it was confirmed that Mel B would be Sandilands' replacement. Mel B said, "[The contestants] are either going to love me or hate me but it's going to be a fun ride. I'm really easy to get on with and I'm a hard worker. I'm firm but nice." Guy Sebastian and Ronan Keating were the only judges from the season 2 who returned.

== Selection process ==
=== Auditions ===
In 2011, the minimum age for contestants to audition was changed to 14 years old, having previously been 16 years old. Auditions in front of the show's producers began in March 2011 in five cities: Perth (Parmelia Hilton, 27 March), Adelaide (AAMI Stadium, 29 March), Brisbane (Gold Coast Convention and Exhibition Centre, 2–3 April), Sydney (Australian Technology Park, 8–10 April) and Melbourne (Moonee Valley Racecourse, 15–17 April). The successful auditionees chosen by the producers were then invited back to the last set of auditions that took place in front of the judges and a live studio audience. These auditions were held in three cities: Brisbane (Brisbane Entertainment Centre, 21–22 May), Melbourne (Hisense Arena, 27–29 May), and Sydney (Sydney Entertainment Centre, 2–3 June).

=== Bootcamp ===
The bootcamp stage was held in Sydney and was first broadcast on 7 September 2011. On the first day of bootcamp, each judge was given a category to mentor and were joined by a celebrity guest judge to help them decide their top twelve acts. Sebastian was assisted by Wynter Gordon and was given the Boys, Mel B was assisted by her husband Stephen Belafonte and was given the Girls, Bassingthwaighte teamed up with Darren Hayes and was assigned the Over 25s, and Keating was assisted by The Veronicas and had the Groups. On the second day, the Boys each had to sing a song made famously by a female artist, the Over 25s got styled for a photo shoot and later each had to perform one song, the Girls had to perform choreography to either Adele's "Rolling in the Deep" or Lady Gaga's "Born This Way", and the Groups held recording sessions with vocal producer Erana Clark. On the third day of bootcamp, the judges along with their celebrity guest judges, narrowed down the contestants to six each.

The 24 successful contestants were:

- Boys: Rob Baron, Trent Bell, Reece Mastin, Johnny Ruffo, Declan Sykes, Mali Talefenua
- Girls: Tyla Bertolli, Sophie Metcalfe (replaced Tara-Lynn Sharrock due to Visa issues), Chantelle Morrell, Jacqui Newland, Christina Parie, Amy Walton
- Over 25s: Mitchell Callaway, Pamela Cook, Marina Davis, Cleo Howman, Paige Phoenix, Andrew Wishart
- Groups: Audio Vixen, Femme Da Funk, Hype (previously known as Lazy J & Big Guy), Three Wishez, Up Front, Young Men Society

=== Judges' House ===
The final round of the selection process, saw the judges reduce their top six contestants to top three contestants. Each judge took their top six contestants to exclusive locations around the world. Sebastian and the Boys travelled to New York City, where he was assisted by Beyoncé and her A-Team, Mel B and the Girls visited Hollywood, where they met up with Melanie C, Bassingthwaighte and the Over 25s travelled to Double Island, Queensland, where she was helped by Jason Derulo, and Keating and the Groups travelled to Los Angeles, California, where they were assisted by Good Charlotte and Leona Lewis,. After, the judges along with their celebrity guest judges, narrowed down the contestants to three each.

Summary of judges' houses
Judge	Category	Location	Assistant	Contestants eliminated
Sebastian	Boys	New York City	Beyoncé	Rob Baron, Trent Bell, Mali Talefenua
Mel B	Girls	Hollywood	Melanie C	Sophie Metcalfe, Chantelle Morrell, Amy Walton
Bassingthwaighte	Over 25s	Double Island, Queensland	Jason Derulo	Pamela Cook, Marina Davis, Paige Phoenix
Keating	Groups	Los Angeles	Good Charlotte; Leona Lewis	Femme Da Funk, Hype, Up Front

== Acts ==
Key:

– Winner
– Runner-up

Contestant	Age(s)	Hometown	Category (mentor)	Result
Reece Mastin	16	Scunthorpe/Greenwith, South Australia	Boys (Sebastian)	Winner
Andrew Wishart	40	Seaford, Victoria	Over 25s (Bassingthwaighte)	Runner-Up
Johnny Ruffo †	23	Balcatta, Western Australia	Boys (Sebastian)	3rd Place
Three Wishez	18–23	Sydney	Groups (Keating)	4th Place
Declan Sykes	15	Fitzroy, Victoria	Boys (Sebastian)	5th Place
Christina Parie	15	Castle Hill, New South Wales	Girls (Mel B)	6th Place
Mitchell Callaway	25	Bowraville, New South Wales	Over 25s (Bassingthwaighte)	7th Place
Young Men Society	22–26	Sydney, New South Wales	Groups (Keating)	8th Place
Audio Vixen	19–28	Sydney, New South Wales	Groups (Keating)	9th Place
Jacqueline "Jacqui" Newland	23	Geelong, Victoria	Girls (Mel B)	10th Place
Tyla Bertolli	19	Melbourne	Girls (Mel B)	11th Place
Cleopatra "Cleo" Howman	25	Gold Coast, Queensland	Over 25s (Bassingthwaighte)	12th Place

== Live shows ==
=== Results summary ===
Colour key

Contestant in Boys

Contestant in Girls

Contestant in Over 25s

Contestant in Groups

– Contestant in the bottom two and had to perform again in the final showdown
– Contestant received the fewest public votes and was immediately eliminated (no final showdown)
– Act received the most public votes

Weekly results per act
Contestant	Week 1	Week 2	Week 3	Week 4	Week 5	Week 6	Week 7	Quarter-Final	Semi-Final	Final	
Contestant	Week 1	Week 2	Week 3	Week 4	Week 5	Week 6	Week 7	Quarter-Final	Semi-Final	Monday Vote	Tuesday Vote
Reece Mastin	Safe	Safe	Safe	Safe	Safe	Safe	Bottom Two	Safe	Safe	Safe	Winner
Andrew Wishart	Safe	Safe	Safe	Safe	Safe	Safe	Safe	Safe	Safe	Safe	Runner-Up
Johnny Ruffo	Safe	Safe	Safe	8th	Safe	6th	Safe	Safe	Safe	3rd	Eliminated (Final)
Three Wishez	Safe	Safe	Safe	Safe	Safe	Safe	Safe	Bottom Two	4th	Eliminated (Semi-Final)	
Declan Sykes	Safe	Safe	Safe	Safe	7th	Safe	Safe	Bottom Two	Eliminated (Quarter-Final)		
Christina Parie	Safe	Safe	Safe	Safe	Safe	Safe	Bottom Two	Eliminated (Week 7)			
Mitchell Callaway	Safe	Safe	Safe	Safe	Safe	7th	Eliminated (Week 6)				
Young Men Society	Safe	Safe	Bottom Two	Safe	8th	Eliminated (Week 5)					
Audio Vixen	Safe	Safe	Safe	9th	Eliminated (Week 4)						
Jacqui Newland	Bottom Two	Bottom Two	Bottom Two	Eliminated (Week 3)							
Tyla Bertolli	Safe	Bottom Two	Eliminated (Week 2)								
Cleo Howman	Bottom Two	Eliminated (Week 1)									
Final Showdown	Howman, Newland	Newland, Bertolli	Newland, Young Men Society	Ruffo, Audio Vixen	Young Men Society, Sykes	Callaway, Ruffo	Parie, Mastin	Sykes, Three Wishez	No bottom two/judges' vote; public votes alone decide who is eliminated.		
Keating's vote to eliminate (Groups)	Howman	Newland	Newland	Ruffo	Sykes	Ruffo	Parie	Sykes	No bottom two/judges' vote; public votes alone decide who is eliminated.		
Bassingthwaighte's vote to eliminate (Over 25s)	Newland	Bertolli	Newland	Ruffo	Young Men Society	Ruffo	Parie	Sykes	No bottom two/judges' vote; public votes alone decide who is eliminated.		
Sebastian's vote to eliminate (Boys)	Howman	Bertolli	Newland	Audio Vixen	Young Men Society	Callaway	Parie	Three Wishez	No bottom two/judges' vote; public votes alone decide who is eliminated.		
Mel B's vote to eliminate (Girls)	Howman	Bertolli	Young Men Society	Audio Vixen	Sykes	Callaway	Mastin	Sykes	No bottom two/judges' vote; public votes alone decide who is eliminated.		
Eliminated	Cleo Howman; 3 of 4 votes Majority	Tyla Bertolli; 3 of 4 votes Majority	Jacqui Newland; 3 of 4 votes Majority	Audio Vixen; 2 of 4 votes Deadlock	Young Men Society; 2 of 4 votes Deadlock	Mitchell Callaway; 2 of 4 votes Deadlock	Christina Parie; 3 of 4 votes Majority	Declan Sykes; 3 of 4 votes Majority	Three Wishez; Public Vote To Save	Johnny Ruffo; Public Vote To Save	Andrew Wishart; Public Vote To Win

=== Live show details ===
==== Week 1 (19/20 September) ====
- Theme: Judges' Choice
- Celebrity performers: Bryan Adams ("When You're Gone") and Jack Vidgen (Medley: "Who's Lovin' You"/"Think")
- Group performance: "Raise Your Glass"

Contestants' performances on the first live show
Contestant	Category (mentor)	Order	Song	Result
Reece Mastin	Boys (Sebastian)	1	"Closer to the Edge"	Safe
Three Wishez	Groups (Keating)	2	"Telephone"	Safe
Andrew Wishart	Over 25s (Bassingthwaighte)	3	"The Man Who Can't Be Moved"	Safe
Christina Parie	Girls (Mel B)	4	"Since U Been Gone"	Safe
Mitchell Callaway	Over 25s (Bassingthwaighte)	5	"Only Girl (In the World)"	Safe
Johnny Ruffo	Boys (Sebastian)	6	"Moves Like Jagger"	Safe
Audio Vixen	Groups (Keating)	7	"Viva la Vida"	Safe
Cleo Howman	Over 25s (Bassingthwaighte)	8	"Jar of Hearts"	Bottom Two
Declan Sykes	Boys (Sebastian)	9	"Uprising"	Safe
Jacqui Newland	Girls (Mel B)	10	"Love Story"	Bottom Two
Young Men Society	Groups (Keating)	11	"The Lazy Song"/"Price Tag"	Safe
Tyla Bertolli	Girls (Mel B)	12	"Set Fire to the Rain"	Safe
Final showdown details
Cleo Howman	Over 25s (Bassingthwaighte)	1	"Chasing Pavements"	Eliminated
Jacqui Newland	Girls (Mel B)	2	"Heavy Cross"	Safe

Judges' vote to eliminate

- Sebastian: Cleo Howman – based on the final showdown performance.
- Mel B: Cleo Howman – backed her own contestant, Jacqui Newland, though stated she did not like Howman since the start of the competition.
- Bassingthwaighte: Jacqui Newland – backed her own contestant, Cleo Howman.
- Keating: Cleo Howman – was impressed by Newland's passion during the final showdown.

Notes

- On the live performance show, the judges opened the show to perform their own hits together. Sebastian performed first on the piano, singing "Who's That Girl", followed by Bassingthwaighte's "Someday Soon". Keating then sang "Lovin' Each Day" and Mel B took the stage last to perform Spice Girls' "Who Do You Think You Are".

==== Week 2 (27/28 September) ====
- Theme: Party Anthems
- Celebrity performers: Kelly Clarkson ("Mr. Know It All") and Sneaky Sound System ("Big")
- Group performance: "Party Rock Anthem" with LMFAO

Contestants' performances on the second live show
Contestant	Category (mentor)	Order	Song	Result
Audio Vixen	Groups (Keating)	1	"Valerie"	Safe
Declan Sykes	Boys (Sebastian)	2	"I Write Sins Not Tragedies"	Safe
Mitchell Callaway	Over 25s (Bassingthwaighte)	3	"All Summer Long"	Safe
Jacqui Newland	Girls (Mel B)	4	"Heaven Is a Place on Earth"	Bottom Two
Young Men Society	Groups (Keating)	5	"You Shook Me All Night Long"	Safe
Tyla Bertolli	Girls (Mel B)	6	"The Edge of Glory"	Bottom Two
Reece Mastin	Boys (Sebastian)	7	"I Kissed a Girl"	Safe
Andrew Wishart	Over 25s (Bassingthwaighte)	8	"I Want to Break Free"	Safe
Three Wishez	Groups (Keating)	9	"Don't Stop the Music"/"Wanna Be Startin' Somethin'"	Safe
Johnny Ruffo	Boys (Sebastian)	10	"Down"	Safe
Christina Parie	Girls (Mel B)	11	"Girls Just Want to Have Fun"	Safe
Final showdown details
Jacqui Newland	Girls (Mel B)	1	"Respect"	Safe
Tyla Bertolli	Girls (Mel B)	2	"Fighter"	Eliminated

Judges' vote to eliminate

- Sebastian: Tyla Bertolli – went with his gut.
- Bassingthwaighte: Tyla Bertolli – based on the final showdown performance.
- Keating: Jacqui Newland – said that Bertolli had improved more.
- Mel B: Tyla Bertolli – said that Newland controlled her nerves better.

Notes

- This week's shows were aired on Tuesday and Wednesday nights due to the Seven Network televising the 2011 Brownlow Medal.
- The songs that the contestants sang in the live performance show were chosen by the Australian public.
- Sebastian was absent on the live results show, but present through live telecast, thus eligible to vote to save.

==== Week 3 (3/4 October) ====
- Theme: Rock
- Mentor: Alice Cooper
- Celebrity performers: Natalie Bassingthwaighte ("All We Have") and Simple Plan ("Can't Keep My Hands Off You")
- Group performance: "Live and Let Die"

Contestants' performances on the third live show
Contestant	Category (mentor)	Order	Song	Rock Artist	Result
Jacqui Newland	Girls (Mel B)	1	"Shut Up and Drive"	Rihanna	Bottom Two
Christina Parie	Girls (Mel B)	2	"Gives You Hell"	The All-American Rejects	Safe
Andrew Wishart	Over 25s (Bassingthwaighte)	3	"The Flame"	Cheap Trick	Safe
Johnny Ruffo	Boys (Sebastian)	4	"Here Without You"	3 Doors Down	Safe
Three Wishez	Groups (Keating)	5	"Numb"	Linkin Park	Safe
Young Men Society	Groups (Keating)	6	"Walk This Way"	Run D.M.C	Bottom Two
Reece Mastin	Boys (Sebastian)	7	"Dream On"	Aerosmith	Safe
Audio Vixen	Groups (Keating)	8	"Good Times"	The Easybeats	Safe
Declan Sykes	Boys (Sebastian)	9	"Life on Mars?"	David Bowie	Safe
Mitchell Callaway	Over 25s (Bassingthwaighte)	10	"Run to Paradise"	The Choirboys	Safe
Final showdown details
Jacqui Newland	Girls (Mel B)	1	"Just a Girl"		Eliminated
Young Men Society	Groups (Keating)	2	"Change the World"		Safe

Judges' vote to eliminate

- Keating: Jacqui Newland – backed his own contestant, Young Men Society.
- Mel B: Young Men Society – backed her own contestant, Jacqui Newland.
- Bassingthwaighte: Jacqui Newland – Young Men Society had done better in the sing-off, because it was Newland's third consecutive time in the bottom two.
- Sebastian: Jacqui Newland – said that Newland had been in the final showdown three weeks in a row whereas Young Men Society had more to give.

==== Week 4 (10/11 October) ====
- Theme: The 90s
- Celebrity performers: Vanessa Amorosi ("Amazing") and Chris Isaak ("Oh, Pretty Woman")
- Group performance: "Hold On"

Contestants' performances on the fourth live show
Contestant	Category (mentor)	Order	Song	Result
Johnny Ruffo	Boys (Sebastian)	1	"I'd Do Anything for Love (But I Won't Do That)"	Bottom Two
Mitchell Callaway	Over 25s (Bassingthwaighte)	2	"Everybody Hurts"	Safe
Three Wishez	Groups (Keating)	3	"Ghetto Supastar (That Is What You Are)"	Safe
Reece Mastin	Boys (Sebastian)	4	"Ironic"	Safe
Audio Vixen	Groups (Keating)	5	"Chains"	Bottom Two
Andrew Wishart	Over 25s (Bassingthwaighte)	6	"Nothing Compares 2 U"	Safe
Declan Sykes	Boys (Sebastian)	7	"Smells Like Teen Spirit"	Safe
Young Men Society	Groups (Keating)	8	"Black or White"	Safe
Christina Parie	Girls (Mel B)	9	"Zombie"	Safe
Final showdown details
Johnny Ruffo	Boys (Sebastian)	1	"Just the Way You Are"	Safe
Audio Vixen	Groups (Keating)	2	"Somebody to Love"	Eliminated

Judges' vote to eliminate

- Keating: Johnny Ruffo – backed his own contestant, Audio Vixen.
- Sebastian: Audio Vixen – backed his own contestant, Johnny Ruffo.
- Bassingthwaighte: Johnny Ruffo – felt that Audio Vixen has improved more.
- Mel B: Audio Vixen – could not decide who to save and sent the result to deadlock.

With the contestants in the bottom two receiving two votes each, the result went to deadlock and reverted to the earlier public vote. Audio Vixen were eliminated as the contestant with the fewest public votes.

==== Week 5 (17/18 October) ====
- Theme: Number-one hits
- Celebrity performers: Altiyan Childs ("Ordinary Man") and Jason Derülo (Medley: "It Girl"/"Don't Wanna Go Home")
- Group performance: Michael Jackson medley with Jason Derülo

Contestants' performances on the fifth live show
Contestant	Category (mentor)	Order	Song	Result
Christina Parie	Girls (Mel B)	1	"Teenage Dirtbag"	Safe
Young Men Society	Groups (Keating)	2	"Single Ladies (Put a Ring on It)"/"Get Busy"	Bottom Two
Declan Sykes	Boys (Sebastian)	3	"Forever Young"	Bottom Two
Mitchell Callaway	Over 25s (Bassingthwaighte)	4	"(I Can't Get No) Satisfaction"	Safe
Johnny Ruffo	Boys (Sebastian)	5	"What Goes Around... Comes Around"/"Cry Me a River"	Safe
Andrew Wishart	Over 25s (Bassingthwaighte)	6	"Dakota"	Safe
Reece Mastin	Boys (Sebastian)	7	"She Will Be Loved"	Safe
Three Wishez	Groups (Keating)	8	"Lose Yourself"	Safe
Final showdown details
Young Men Society	Groups (Keating)	1	"Let's Get Married"	Eliminated
Declan Sykes	Boys (Sebastian)	2	"Wonderwall"	Safe

Judges' vote to eliminate

- Keating: Declan Sykes – backed his own contestant, Young Men Society.
- Sebastian: Young Men Society – backed his own contestant, Declan Sykes.
- Mel B: Declan Sykes – based her decision on who would be more favourable internationally, which was Young Men Society.
- Bassingthwaighte: Young Men Society – sent the result to deadlock since it was Young Men Society's second time in the bottom two and Sykes' first, which meant Sykes was better during the sing-off.

With the contestants in the bottom two receiving two votes each, the result was deadlock and reverted to the earlier public vote. Young Men Society were eliminated as the contestant with the fewest public votes.

==== Week 6 (24/25 October) ====
- Theme: Australian hits
- Celebrity performers: Aloe Blacc ("I Need a Dollar") and Darren Hayes ("Bloodstained Heart")
- Group performance: Savage Garden medley with Darren Hayes

Contestants' performances on the sixth live show
Contestant	Category (mentor)	Order	Song	Australian Artist	Result
Mitchell Callaway	Over 25s (Bassingthwaighte)	1	"Throw Your Arms Around Me"	Hunters & Collectors	Bottom Two
Johnny Ruffo	Boys (Sebastian)	2	"Lost Without You"	Delta Goodrem	Bottom Two
Three Wishez	Groups (Keating)	3	"You're the Voice"	John Farnham	Safe
Andrew Wishart	Over 25s (Bassingthwaighte)	4	"Flame Trees"	Cold Chisel	Safe
Declan Sykes	Boys (Sebastian)	5	"Fall at Your Feet"	Crowded House	Safe
Christina Parie	Girls (Mel B)	6	"Weir"	Killing Heidi	Safe
Reece Mastin	Boys (Sebastian)	7	"Joker & the Thief"	Wolfmother	Safe
Final showdown details
Mitchell Callaway	Over 25s (Bassingthwaighte)	1	"I Won't Let Go"		Eliminated
Johnny Ruffo	Boys (Sebastian)	2	"Billie Jean"		Safe

Judges' vote to eliminate

- Sebastian: Mitchell Callaway – backed his own contestant, Johnny Ruffo.
- Bassingthwaighte: Johnny Ruffo – backed her own contestant, Mitchell Callaway.
- Mel B: Mitchell Callaway – said Ruffo was the most improved since the first week.
- Keating: Johnny Ruffo – telling that Callaway has been trying more hard that week.

With the contestants in the bottom two receiving two votes each, the result went to deadlock and reverted to the earlier public vote. Callaway was eliminated as the contestant with the fewest public votes.

==== Week 7 (31 October/1 November) ====
- Theme: Dance
- Celebrity performers: Ronan Keating ("Arthur's Theme (Best That You Can Do)") and Jessica Mauboy featuring Stan Walker ("Galaxy")
- Group performance: "We Run the Night"/"Get It" with Havana Brown

Contestants' performances on the seventh live show
Contestant	Category (mentor)	Order	Song	Result
Christina Parie	Girls (Mel B)	1	"When Love Takes Over"	Bottom Two
Declan Sykes	Boys (Sebastian)	2	"Walking on a Dream"	Safe
Reece Mastin	Boys (Sebastian)	3	"Stayin' Alive"	Bottom Two
Andrew Wishart	Over 25s (Bassingthwaighte)	4	"Titanium"	Safe
Johnny Ruffo	Boys (Sebastian)	5	"Without You"	Safe
Three Wishez	Groups (Keating)	6	"I Feel for You"/"Push It"	Safe
Final showdown details
Christina Parie	Girls (Mel B)	1	"I'm with You"	Eliminated
Reece Mastin	Boys (Sebastian)	2	"Always"	Safe

Judges' vote to eliminate

- Mel B: Reece Mastin – backed her own contestant, Christina Parie.
- Sebastian: Christina Parie – backed his own contestant, Reece Mastin.
- Keating: Christina Parie – stated that Mastin has improved more.
- Bassingthwaighte: Christina Parie – chose to save Mastin since he has more to deliver, while Parie was toldto "stay true to [her]self".

==== Week 8: Quarter-Final (7/8 November) ====
- Theme: Legends
- Celebrity performers: Ricki-Lee ("Raining Diamonds") and Susan Boyle ("Autumn Leaves")
- Group performance: "How Can We Be Lovers?" with Michael Bolton

Contestants' performances in the quarter-final
Contestant	Category (mentor)	Order	Song	Result
Johnny Ruffo	Boys (Sebastian)	1	"Sir Duke"	Safe
Andrew Wishart	Over 25s (Bassingthwaighte)	2	"I Still Haven't Found What I'm Looking For"	Safe
Declan Sykes	Boys (Sebastian)	3	"Help!"	Bottom Two
Three Wishez	Groups (Keating)	4	"In the Air Tonight"	Bottom Two
Reece Mastin	Boys (Sebastian)	5	"All by Myself"	Safe
Final showdown details
Declan Sykes	Boys (Sebastian)	1	"The Ballad of Mona Lisa"	Eliminated
Three Wishez	Groups (Keating)	2	"Nobody's Perfect"	Safe

Judges' vote to eliminate

- Keating: Declan Sykes – backed his own contestant, Three Wishez.
- Sebastian: Three Wishez – backed his own contestant, Declan Sykes.
- Bassingthwaighte: Declan Sykes – stated that Three Wishez improved more.
- Mel B: Declan Sykes – stated that Three Wishez could go further in the competition.

==== Week 9: Semi-Final (14/15 November) ====
- Theme: Pleasure and Pain
- Mentor: Stevie Nicks
- Celebrity performers: Florence and the Machine ("Shake It Out"), Ed Sheeran ("The A Team") and Stevie Nicks ("Secret Love")
- Group performance: Fleetwood Mac medley

Contestants' performances in the semi-final
Contestant	Category (mentor)	Order	First song	Order	Second song	Result
Andrew Wishart	Over 25s (Bassingthwaighte)	1	"Animal"	5	"Burn for You"	Safe
Johnny Ruffo	Boys (Sebastian)	2	"So Sick"	6	"Tonight Tonight"	Safe
Reece Mastin	Boys (Sebastian)	3	"Breakeven"	7	"Paradise City"	Safe
Three Wishez	Groups (Keating)	4	"The Time (Dirty Bit)"	8	"Turning Tables"	Eliminated

Notes

- For the first time this season, each contestants performed two songs – one uplifting and one emotional.
- Also for the first time, there was no final showdown and the contestant that received the fewest public votes was immediately eliminated.

==== Week 10: Final (21/22 November) ====
21 November

- Theme: No theme (songs from the auditions and live shows that the mentor believes will show their true talent); superstar duets
- Superstar duet performers:
  - The Fray with Andrew Wishart
  - Salt-n-Pepa with Johnny Ruffo
  - Kylie Minogue with Reece Mastin
- Group performance: "Can't Get You Out of My Head"/"Better the Devil You Know"/"All the Lovers" with Kylie Minogue

Contestants' performances on the Monday Final
Contestant	Category (mentor)	Order	Audition song	Order	Song of the series	Order	Winner's single	Order	Superstar duet	Result
Andrew Wishart	Over 25s (Bassingthwaighte)	1	"Someone Like You"	4	"Dakota"	7	"This Much I Know"	10	"You Found Me"	Safe
Johnny Ruffo	Boys (Sebastian)	2	"Do You Remember"	5	"Sir Duke"	8	"You Don't Wanna Know"	11	"Shoop"/"Push It"	Eliminated
Reece Mastin	Boys (Sebastian)	3	"Come Get Some"	6	"Dream On"	9	"Good Night"	12	"Kids"	Safe

Johnny Ruffo received the fewest public votes and was automatically eliminated.

22 November

Guest performers: The Fray ("Heartbeat"), Luke O'Dell ("Introvert Extrovert"), Guy Sebastian ("Don't Worry Be Happy") and Kylie Minogue ("I Should Be So Lucky")

- Group Performances:
  - "I Like How It Feels" (performed by top three contestants)
  - "Imagine" with Emmanuel Kelly (performed with top 12 contestants)

Contestants' performances on the Tuesday Final
Contestant	Category (mentor)	Order	Song	Result
Andrew Wishart	Over 25s (Bassingthwaighte)	1	"With or Without You"	Runner-Up
Reece Mastin	Boys (Sebastian)	2	"Cryin'"	Winner

== Reception ==
=== Controversy ===
Three days before the season's premiere, Mel B made comments about the other judges, labelling them dishonest and boring. She said, "I don't care much for the other judges ... Ronan thinks he knows it all [and] Natalie is just too nice and really dishonest. Guy could just be boring, like 'get on with it. Keep it moving, brother.'" During a radio interview with The Kyle and Jackie O Show on 29 August 2011, Bassingthwaighte responded to Mel B's comments saying, "I think it's in fun – I hope so otherwise she deserves a slap." Mel B appeared on the same radio show the following day and said, "They're all scared of me and I love it, there's got to be one bitch on the show so I might as well take that bloody crown."

More controversy occurred after Sebastian took aim at contestant Mitchell Callaway's attitude to the competition following his performance of "Run to Paradise" on the third live performance show. Sebastian told Callaway: "You've got to have the right attitude to this competition, you've got to be focused and to be honest, not be rude to people and have the work ethic. For you to not learn your lyrics and for you to at times be rude to crew, you really have to pull that in and rein that in because you won't last long in this competition or this industry if you do that." The following morning, Callaway's mentor Bassingthwaighte spoke to radio station 2Day FM about the issue:

"It makes me feel sick actually, I feel sick in the stomach ... I feel Mitchell did the best performance that he's done so far, I think Guy made the mistake of commenting on stuff that didn't happen on camera. He said he's rude to crew and needs to check his behaviour ... When he [Mitchell] got off stage he said, 'I'm not coming back'."

However, later that same day, Callaway tweeted, "I'm not gunna quit guys ... It's not the Aussie way. I'm not gunna let al u beautiful ppl dwn. Or Natalie after everythyng she's done." On the third live results show, Sebastian apologised to Callaway and said he "chose the wrong time and place to say it". The Seven Network insiders revealed that a clash between Callaway and another contestant, Declan Sykes, was the real reason behind Sebastian's on-air rebuke. Sykes, who has Asperger syndrome, reportedly took offence at being pricked with a pin by Callaway.

=== Contestants ===
Contestant Emmanuel Kelly appeared on the first episode of the season's audition show on 29 August 2011, and performed a rendition of John Lennon's "Imagine". His performance earned a standing ovation from the judges and the audience. Keating was full of praise for Kelly, who then moved into the next round of competition. Keating told Kelly: "I don't think I've ever been moved as I was by that performance." Kelly and his brother Ahmed were adopted by Children First Foundation boss, Moira Kelly, who is also the guardian of the once-conjoined Bangladesh twins, Krishna and Trishna. Kelly and his brother came from Iraq, where they were abandoned at an orphanage and both suffered limb deficiencies as a result of chemical warfare. During the third day of bootcamp, Sebastian eliminated Kelly from the competition, disappointed that he had forgotten words to his song the day before. Emmanuel Kelly appeared and gave an inspirational performance (speech and song) at the UN Youth Dialogue on 30 May 2018.

Another contestant, Luke O'Dell, appeared on the third audition show on 31 August. After failing to impress the judges with his rendition of Kelly Clarkson's "Since U Been Gone", O'Dell then sang an original song he wrote titled, "Introvert Extrovert", which made him an overnight internet sensation. The song entered the iTunes' Top 100 chart overnight and landed O'Dell thousands of fans on social media and his official YouTube channel. The song title also became a worldwide trending topic on Twitter for more than two hours, following his television performance of the song. Overnight commentary on Twitter and Facebook quickly labelled O'Dell as the Australian version of Rebecca Black, who found fame with her song, "Friday". However, O'Dell failed to move through to the next round of the competition. Both Kelly and O'Dell returned to perform on the live grand final decider show.

=== Ratings ===
The premiere episode on 29 August 2011 topped the night's overall ratings with 1,319,000 viewers, compared to the 1,186,000 viewers who tuned in to watch the premiere episode of the second season. All six of the audition episodes ranked first on their respective nights and peaked the highest the following night with an audience of 1,690,000 viewers. The first live performance show on 19 September 2011, gained 1,452,000 viewers and topped the night's overall ratings. The live grand final decider show on 22 November 2011, was the highest rated episode of the third season with 1,998,000 viewers.

Colour key:
– Highest rating during the season
– Lowest rating during the season

Episode		Original airdate	Timeslot	Viewers (millions)	Nightly rank	Ref
1	Auditions	29 August 2011	Monday 7:30 pm–9:00 pm	1.319	#1	
2	Auditions	30 August 2011	Tuesday 7:30 pm–8:30 pm	1.690	#1	
3	Auditions	31 August 2011	Wednesday 7:30 pm–8:30 pm	1.526	#1	
4	Auditions	1 September 2011	Thursday 7:30 pm–8:30 pm	1.403	#1	
5	Auditions	5 September 2011	Monday 7:30 pm–8:30 pm	1.475	#1	
6	Auditions	6 September 2011	Tuesday 7:30 pm–8:30 pm	1.636	#1	
7	Bootcamp	7 September 2011	Wednesday 7:30 pm–8:30 pm	1.527	#1	
8	Bootcamp	8 September 2011	Thursday 7:30 pm–8:30 pm	1.403	#1	
9	Bootcamp	12 September 2011	Monday 7:30 pm–8:30 pm	1.398	#1	
10	Home Visits	13 September 2011	Tuesday 7:30 pm–8:30 pm	1.404	#2	
11	Home Visits	14 September 2011	Wednesday 7:30 pm–8:30 pm	1.457	#1	
12	Home Visits	15 September 2011	Thursday 7:30 pm–8:30 pm	1.284	#1	
13	Live show 1	19 September 2011	Monday 7:30 pm–9:30 pm	1.452	#1	
14	Live decider 1	20 September 2011	Tuesday 7:30 pm–8:30 pm	1.429	#5	
15	Live show 2	27 September 2011	Tuesday 7:30 pm–9:30 pm	1.410	#1	
16	Live decider 2	28 September 2011	Wednesday 7:30 pm–8:30 pm	1.221	#2	
17	Live show 3	3 October 2011		1.255	#1	
18	Live decider 3	4 October 2011	Tuesday 7:30 pm–8:30 pm	1.399	#2	
19	Live show 4	10 October 2011	Monday 7:30 pm–9:00 pm	1.310	#3	
20	Live decider 4	11 October 2011	Tuesday 7:30 pm–8:30 pm	1.486	#2	
21	Live show 5	17 October 2011	Monday 7:30 pm–9:00 pm	1.371	#2	
22	Live decider 5	18 October 2011	Tuesday 7:30 pm–8:30 pm	1.418	#2	
23	Live show 6	24 October 2011	Monday 7:30 pm–9:00 pm	1.352	#3	
24	Live decider 6	25 October 2011	Tuesday 7:30 pm–8:30 pm	1.387	#2	
25	Live show 7	31 October 2011	Monday 7:30 pm–8:30 pm	1.205	#3	
26	Live decider 7	1 November 2011	Tuesday 7:30 pm–8:30 pm	1.517	#3	
27	Live show 8	7 November 2011	Monday 7:30 pm–8:30 pm	1.326	#3	
28	Live decider 8	8 November 2011	Tuesday 7:30 pm–8:30 pm	1.574	#1	
29	Live show 9	14 November 2011	Monday 7:30 pm–9:00 pm	1.408	#1	
30	Live decider 9	15 November 2011	Tuesday 7:30 pm–8:30 pm	1.498	#1	
31	Live Grand Final show	21 November 2011	Monday 7:30 pm–9:30 pm	1.458	#2	
32	Live Grand Final decider	22 November 2011	Tuesday 7:30 pm–9:30 pm	1.721	#2	
32	Winner announced	22 November 2011	Tuesday 7:30 pm–9:30 pm	1.998	#1	
