= Prey (2009 film) =

- Official Australian Poster
- Directed by: George T. Miller (as Oscar D'Roccster)
- Written by: George T. Miller; Andrew Topp
- Produced by: Robert Lewis Galinsky; Elizabeth Howatt-Jackman
- Starring: Natalie Bassingthwaighte; Jesse Johnson; Ben Kermode; Natalie Walker; Christian Clark; Kristin Sargent; Nicholas Bell; Stephen Beck; Jacqueline Steward; Zachary Schaefer; Taylor Johnson
- Cinematography: Andrew Topp
- Music by: Dale Cornelius
- Distributed by: Top Cat Films
- Release date: 5 May 2009
- Country: Australia
- Language: English

Prey, also known as Dreamtime's Over, and The Outback is a 2009 Australian supernatural horror film directed by George T. Miller (though credited to Oscar D'Roccster), written by Miller and starring former Neighbours actress and Rogue Traders lead singer Natalie Bassingthwaighte, and American Jesse Johnson.

The film is the last directed by Miller before his death in February 2023.

== Plot summary ==
In April 1987, two North Americans disappeared in the West Australian desert on a 4WD holiday. They were never seen alive again. Their abandoned vehicles and unused supplies were found in sand dunes near an Aboriginal sacred site less than an hour away from the closest town. Two years later, in May 1989, the two men were both found dead of natural causes, on the same day, 1,000 miles apart back in North America.

Twenty years after the original incident, 3 couples who set out on a surfing trip are lured into the same desert area, by a strange local whose master needs fresh victims to consume. Preconceived assumptions about friendship, undiscovered sexual liaisons, and false leadership come apart as the three couples realize that the vacation is over.

== Cast ==
- Natalie Bassingthwaighte as Kate
- Jesse Johnson as Gus
- Natalie Walker as Ling
- Ben Kermode as Matt
- Christian Clark as Jason
- Kristin Sargent as Annika
- Nicholas Bell
- Pamela Shaw as Morgan Weismann
- Joe Hachem as Motel Operator
- Geire Kami as Patient
- Jennifer Hansen as Waitress
- Suhayb Lahdo as The Man
- Dawn Klingberg as Kora
- Stephen Beck as Pianist
- Jacqueline Steward as Confused Girl
- Zachary Schaefer as Bemused Pedestrian
- Taylor Johnson as Internet Enthusiast

== Production ==
The outback had to be re-created in a Melbourne warehouse to save filming costs. In addition to a perforated eardrum which caused filming dates to be rescheduled, lead star Natalie Bassingthwaighte injured her ankle twice during filming, causing hassles regarding the physicality of her role. There was friction between the producers and director George T. Miller due to last minute script changes by Miller. Also, investor issues plagued the shoot and at one point the line-producers were hinting they were ready to walk. Bassingthwaighte was used in a lesbian shower scene that raised great controversy, but eventually made it to the final release.

== Release ==
The film premiered on 5 May 2009 in Sydney and Melbourne, and was given a theatrical release on 9 May 2009 in Australia.

=== DVD release ===
The film was scheduled to have a U.S. DVD release on 13 July 2010 from Xenon Pictures under the new title "The Outback" or "Dreamtime's Over."

== See also ==
- Cinema of Australia
