= A Love Like This =

A Love Like This may refer to:

- A Love Like This (2016 film), a Seychelles romantic drama
- A Love Like This (2026 film), an American romantic drama
- "A Love Like This" (New Kids on the Block song), from the 2024 studio album Still Kids

== See also ==
- Love Like This (disambiguation)
- "A Love Like That", 2003 song by Gregg Alexander
- A Love Like Ours, 1999 studio album by American singer Barbra Streisand
- "A Love Like Yours (Don't Come Knocking Everyday)", 1963 song by American group Martha and the Vandellas
- "A Moment Like This", 2002 a song by American singer Kelly Clarkson
