= Maeder (band) =

Australian band

- Genres: Rock
- Labels: Blah! Records, Locomotive Music
- Members: Nic Maeder; Sebastian V. Maeder; Travis Dragani; Nicko Thornton
- Past members: Kit Riley; Cameron McGlinchey

Maeder is an Australian rock band formed by brothers Nic and Sebastian Maeder. They were signed to Warner Music but were released in 2005 prior to putting out their album which had been recorded with Steve James. They later released their debut album through Locomotive Records in 2007.

From late 2011, Nic Maeder is the new singer of Swiss rock group Gotthard.

== Discography ==
Albums

- Maeder (2007, Locomotive Records)

Singles

- "Business in Me" (2004, Blah! Records) – Australia No. 37
- "Another Thing Comin'" (2005)
