= Jesse Johnson (actor) =

American actor (born 1982)

- Born: Jesse Wayne Johnson; December 7, 1982 (age 43); Los Angeles, California, U.S.
- Occupations: Actor; singer; screenwriter
- Years active: 2001–present
- Parents: Don Johnson; Patti D'Arbanville
- Relatives: Dakota Johnson (half-sister)

Jesse Wayne Johnson (born December 7, 1982) is an American actor. He is the son of actors Don Johnson and Patti D'Arbanville.

== Early life ==
Johnson was born on December 7, 1982, in Los Angeles to actors Don Johnson and Patti D'Arbanville, and was raised in Aspen, Colorado. His parents separated when he was three years old. He has seven half-siblings, including actress Dakota Johnson.

== Career ==
In 2001, Jesse made his acting debut in a guest appearance of the CBS television series Nash Bridges, in the episode "Quack Fever". In 2003, he appeared as Young Lt. Benjamin Tyson in the made-for-television film Word of Honor. Jesse majored in theater at Occidental College, in Los Angeles, and graduated in 2004.

He made his feature film debut as Jason in the film Redline, starring alongside Nathan Phillips and Eddie Griffin. The film was released April 13, 2007 and debuted at #11 on the US Box Office Chart and earned $6.8 million worldwide. The film's critical reaction was extremely negative. One critic called it "idiotic".

Also in 2007, he began filming a low budget independent Australian horror film called Prey. The film, starring Natalie Bassingthwaighte, had a limited release in Australia. Labelled a box office bomb, it earned a lifetime gross of just over A$700.00 and was panned by critics. Jake Wilson, reviewing the film for The Age in May, 2009, said: "A film that aims so low and fails so miserably deserves nothing but contempt". The DVD was released in October 2009, both in Australia by Paramount in 2010, and in the US by Xenon in 2011.

Jesse starred as Damon in the Paramount Digital Entertainment-produced Circle of Eight, which aired exclusively on Myspace.com. Alongside Rachel Hunter, he was cast in the independent film My Life: Untitled. He also starred in the indie comedy Head Over Spurs in Love (2010) as Bubba.

In 2012, he starred in the Spanish TV series Con el culo al aire, in the role of Bobby, a young American from a billionaire's family. His most recent work was in the National Geographic Channel's airing of Killing Lincoln (2013), in which he portrayed John Wilkes Booth – the actor who assassinated the 16th American president, Abraham Lincoln. He played the 'Young Earl McGraw' in season 2 of the El Rey series From Dusk Till Dawn aired in September 2015.

Johnson is the lead singer and guitarist for the power pop band Blame Baby along with Omar D. Brancato and Matt Tucci. They released their first single, "Headcase", in 2019.

== Filmography ==
=== Film ===
Year	Title	Role	Notes
2007	Redline	Jason	
2009	Dreamtime's Over	Gus	
2009	Circle of Eight	Damon	
2011	The Back-up Bride	Bubba Weston	
2011	¿Para qué sirve un oso?	Vincent	
2013	Chapman	Alex Fletcher	
2017	Gun Shy	Daniel	
2023	Nocturne	Julian	Short film

=== Television ===
Year	Title	Role	Notes
2001	Nash Bridges	Bobby's Son	Episode: "Quack Fever"
2003	Word of Honor	Lt. Benjamin Tyson in Vietnam	Television film
2009	Dollhouse	Doll	Episode: "The Public Eye"
2011	Law & Order: LA	Joe Starke	Episode: "Van Nuys"
2011	A Mann's World	Adam Mann	Television film
2012	Con el culo al aire	Bobby	13 episodes
2013	Killing Lincoln	John Wilkes Booth	Television film
2014	Grey's Anatomy	Logan Treadwell	Episode: "You Be Illin'"
2015	From Dusk till Dawn: The Series	Young Earl McGraw	Episode: "Bizarre Tales"
2016	NCIS	Robbie Bishop	Episode: "Enemy Combatant"
2017	Twin Peaks: The Return	Younger Man	Episode: "Part 7"
2019	Hawaii Five-0	Richie Gormican	Episode: "Ne'e aku, ne'e mai ke one o Punahoa"
2025	Doctor Odyssey	Young Robert Massey	Episode: "Hot Tub Week"

== Discography ==
All entries are by the band Blame Baby unless otherwise noted.

Extended plays

- Honest Answers to Your Most Private Questions (2020)

Singles

- "Headcase" (2019)
- "The Floor" (2020)
- "Silhouette" (2020)
