= Young Men Society =

Australian musical group

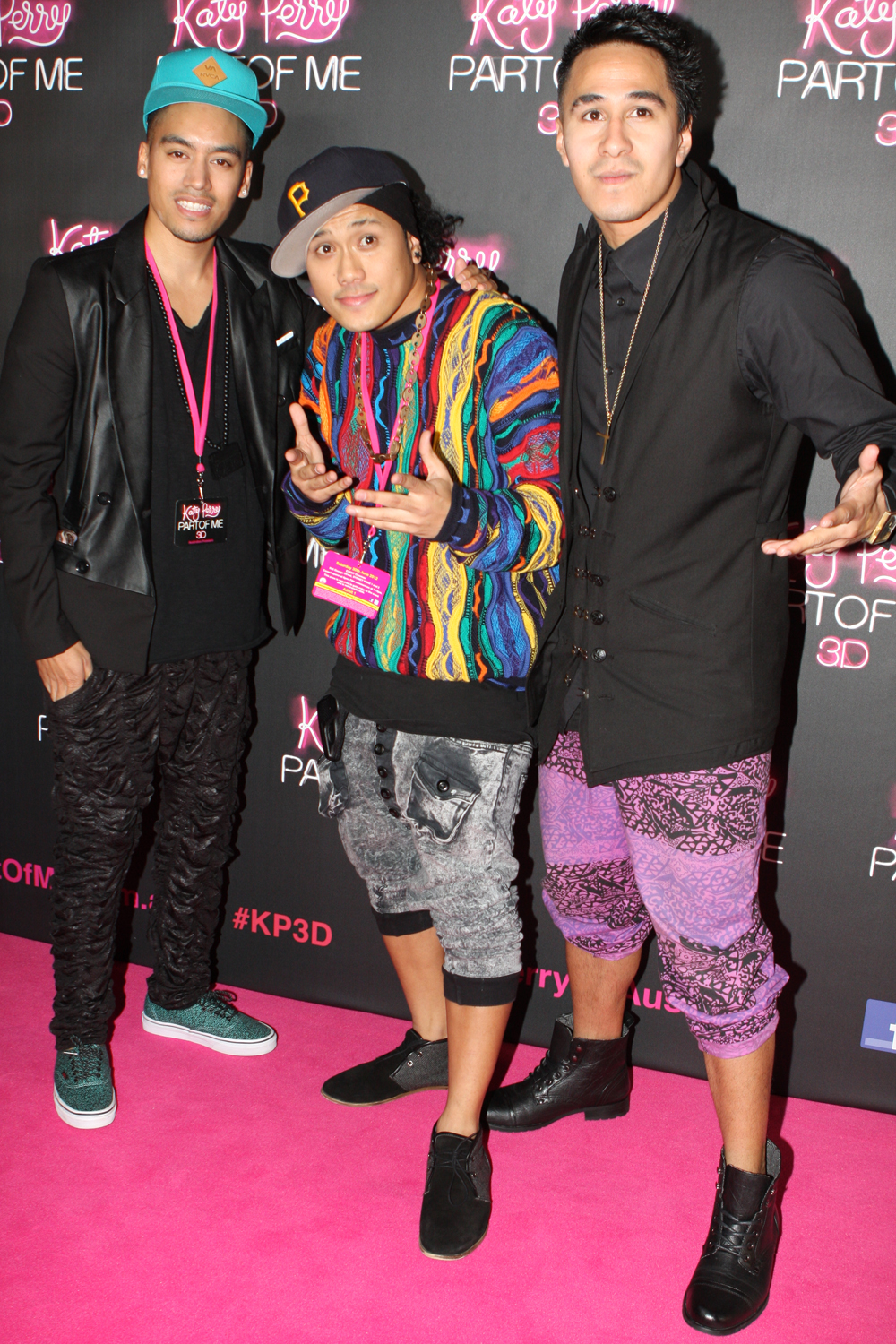
- Young Men Society at the Katy Perry: Part of Me Australian Premiere in June 2012. From left to right: Nathan, Andi and Josh.

Background information
- Origin: Sydney, New South Wales, Australia
- Genres: Pop
- Years active: 2009–present
- Labels: Sony
- Members: Andi Tahta; Josh Fonmosa; Nathan Tamati
- Website: ymsmusic.com

Young Men Society are an Australian boy band consisting of members Andi Tahta, Josh Fonmosa and Nathan Tamati. They rose to fame as grand finalists on the third season of The X Factor Australia in 2011. The group later signed with Sony Music Australia and released their debut single "We Own the Night" in March 2012, which reached the top thirty in New Zealand.

== Biography ==
=== Early life and formation ===
Young Men Society were formed in 2009 at a hip hop dance class. One of their friends came up with the group's name and initially they thought it sounded "corny", however the name eventually grew on them and they have since loved it. Josh Fonmoa was born and raised in Sydney, while Andi Tahta originally came from Jakarta, Indonesia, and Nathan Tamati from England. At the age of 10, Tahta and his family relocated to Australia "in search of a better life". Tamati decided to take a break from college and moved to Australia in 2005 to live with his brother Damon. All members worked together in retail and as dance teachers.

=== 2011: The X Factor Australia ===
Young Men Society successfully auditioned for the third season of The X Factor Australia in 2011, singing Mike Posner's "Cooler Than Me". They eventually progressed through to the live shows and were mentored by Ronan Keating. They were in the bottom two in week three with Jacqui Newland but were saved by the judges. However, voting statistics revealed that Newland received more votes than Young Men Society, which meant that if the result went to deadlock, Young Men Society would have been eliminated. In the fifth week, Young Men Society were eliminated from the competition on 18 October 2011.

Young Men Society performed the following songs on The X Factor:

Show	Song choice	Original Artist	Theme	Result
Auditions	"Cooler than Me"	Mike Posner	Free choice	Through to bootcamp
Bootcamp	"Down"	Jay Sean	Free choice	Through to home visits
Home visits	"The Scientist"	Coldplay	Free choice	Through to live shows
Home visits	"True"	Spandau Ballet	Free choice	Through to live shows
Live show 1	"The Lazy Song"/"Price Tag"	Bruno Mars/Jessie J	Judges' choice	Safe
Live show 2	"You Shook Me All Night Long"	AC/DC	Party anthems	Safe
Live show 3	"Walk This Way"	Aerosmith	Rock	Bottom two
Live show 3 (bottom two)	"Change the World"	Eric Clapton	Free choice	Safe
Live show 4	"Black or White"	Michael Jackson	The 90s	Safe
Live show 5	"Single Ladies (Put a Ring on It)"/"Get Busy"	Beyoncé/Sean Paul	Number-one hits	Bottom two
Live show 5 (bottom two)	"Let's Get Married"	Jagged Edge	Free choice	Eliminated

=== 2012–present: Record deal and debut single ===
Following their departure from The X Factor, Young Men Society did not receive any offers of recording contracts from record labels. They decided to record their first single titled "We Own the Night" as independent artists and filmed their own music video for the song. In an interview with The Music Network, Tahta stated "After the show we actually didn't have any kind of [label] options, there was a point in time where we were really down, but we just told ourselves, 'Let's just keep going, let's make this track, let's just keep recording, let's do a video for it". Sony Music Australia were impressed with the single and its accompanying video, and decided to sign Young Men Society to their record label.

During January and February 2012, Young Men Society were supporting acts for Justice Crew's Sexy and I Know It Tour. The single "We Own the Night" was released via iTunes Stores on 16 March 2012. It debuted and peaked on the New Zealand Singles Chart at number 28, but failed to impact the Australian ARIA Singles Chart. In April 2012, Young Men Society were supporting acts for Reece Mastin's New Zealand tour. The group are no longer signed to Sony Music Australia.

== Discography ==
=== Singles ===
Title	Year	Peak chart positions		Album
Title	Year	AUS	NZ	Album
"We Own the Night"	2012	—	28	Non-album single
"—" denotes a recording that did not chart.

=== Music videos ===
Title	Year	Director(s)
"We Own the Night"	2012	
