= Alive (Natalie Bassingthwaighte song) =

Single by Natalie Bassingthwaighte

from the album 1000 Stars
- B-side: "Remember Me"
- Released: 14 October 2008
- Recorded: Chalice Studios (Los Angeles); Henson Studios (Los Angeles)
- Genre: Electropop; dance-pop
- Length: 3:31
- Label: Sony BMG
- Songwriters: Natalie Bassingthwaighte; Arnthor Birgisson; Andrew Frampton
- Producers: Arnthor Birgisson; Andrew Frampton

Natalie Bassingthwaighte singles chronology
"Don't Give Up" (2006)	"Alive" (2008)	"Someday Soon" (2009)

"Alive" is the debut solo single by Australian recording artist and actress Natalie Bassingthwaighte. It was released on 14 October 2008, as the first single from her debut solo album 1000 Stars. The song's musical-genre is pop and its lyrics describe being free, taking chances and making love. Upon its release, "Alive" peaked at number eight on the ARIA Singles Chart and was certified platinum by the Australian Recording Industry Association for sales exceeding 70,000 copies.

"Alive" was written by Bassingthwaighte, Arnthor Birgisson and Andrew Frampton in Los Angeles, during the last week Bassingthwaighte was writing songs for 1000 Stars. It was also her last writing session with Birgisson and Frampton. Bassingthwaighte stated that it was really hard to write "Alive" because they wanted to write something that was "just fun" because she felt a song like that was missing from the album. The music video was directed by Anthony Rose and features Bassingthwaighte dressed in multiple outfits and wigs.

== Release and reception ==
"Alive" was released as a digital download on 14 October 2008. On 10 November 2008, it was released as a digital extended play (EP) which included the B-side song "Remember Me" and an Electrodex remix of "Alive". The EP was later released as a CD on 15 November 2008. "Alive" was released as a digital download for SingStar via the PlayStation Network in November 2009.

Upon its release, "Alive" debuted at number 39 on the ARIA Singles Chart on 27 October 2008. Twelve weeks later it peaked at number eight. The song was certified platinum by the Australian Recording Industry Association for sales exceeding 70,000 copies. "Alive" also reached number six on the ARIA Physical Singles Chart, number two on the ARIA Australian Artists Singles Chart and number seven on the ARIA Digital Tracks Chart.

== Music video ==
Bassingthwaighte in one of many looks from the "Alive" music video.

The music video for "Alive" was directed by Anthony Rose and filmed on 20 October 2008. The video features Bassingthwaighte dressed in multiple outfits and wigs. It begins with Bassingthwaighte sitting on a purple chair wearing a blond wig. She is then shown in a black and red dress dancing in front of a black background. The third sequence of the video was filmed in black and white and features Bassingthwaighte wearing an afro. This is followed by scenes of her on a swing wearing a red wig and dancing with two male dancers (brothers Hilton and David Denis who featured in So You Think You Can Dance Australia). The video premiered in Australia on 6 November 2008.

== Live performances ==
Bassingthwaighte premiered "Alive" during a performance at the Nickelodeon Australian Kids' Choice Awards 2008 held in Melbourne on 11 October 2008. In October 2008, she performed the song at the after-party for the stage show Priscilla, Queen of the Desert. Bassingthwaighte also performed "Alive" during Australia's 2009 New Year's Eve party in Sydney.

== Formats and track listings ==
- Digital download
1. "Alive" – 3:31
- CD / Digital EP
1. "Alive" – 3:30
2. "Remember Me" – 4:32
3. "Alive" (Electrodex remix) – 4:31

== Credits and personnel ==
Credits adapted from the liner notes of 1000 Stars.

Locations

- Recorded at Chalice Studios and Henson Studios in Los Angeles.
- Mixed at The Vault Studios in Stockholm.
- Mastered at Sterling Sound in New York City.

Personnel

- Songwriting – Natalie Bassingthwaighte, Arnthor Birgisson, Andrew Frampton
- Production – Arnthor Birgisson, Andrew Frampton
- Mixing – Arnthor Birgisson
- Recording – Deyder Cintron
- Guitars – Esbjorn Ohrwall, Max Martin
- Programming – Arnthor Birgisson
- All vocals – Natalie Bassingthwaighte
- Mastering – Leon Zervos

== Charts ==
=== Weekly charts ===
Chart (2008)	Peak position
Australia (ARIA)	8

=== Year-end charts ===
Chart (2008)	Rank
ARIA Singles Chart	73
ARIA Australian Artist Singles Chart	19
Chart (2009)	Rank
ARIA Australian Artist Singles Chart	18

== Certifications ==
Region	Certification	Certified units/sales
Australia (ARIA)	Platinum	70,000^{^}
^{^} Shipments figures based on certification alone.

== Release history ==
Country	Date	Format	Label	Catalogue
Australia	14 October 2008	Digital download	Sony BMG Australia	
Australia	10 November 2008	Digital EP	Sony BMG Australia	
Australia	15 November 2008	CD	Sony BMG Australia	88697420212
