= Love Like This (Natalie Bassingthwaighte song) =

Single by Natalie Bassingthwaighte

from the album 1000 Stars
- Released: 29 January 2010
- Recorded: Metrophonic Studios (United Kingdom)
- Genre: Dance-pop
- Length: 3:55 (Album version)
- Label: Sony
- Songwriter(s): Paul Barry; Mark Taylor; Alex Smith
- Producer(s): Brian Rawling; Alex Smith

Natalie Bassingthwaighte singles chronology
"Not for You" (2009)	"Love Like This" (2010)	"All We Have" (2011)

"Love Like This" is a song recorded by Australian singer and actress Natalie Bassingthwaighte. It was written by Paul Barry, Alex Smith and Mark Taylor. The song was released on 29 January 2010 as the fifth and final single from Bassingthwaighte's debut solo album 1000 Stars. Upon its release, "Love Like This" peaked at number 88 on the ARIA Singles Chart.

== Background ==
"Love Like This" was released to support the AIDS Council of New South Wales' campaign "Wear It With Pride" leading up to the 2010 Mardi Gras parade. All of the single's proceeds went towards the ongoing support of the LGBT community. Of the single and the campaign, Bassingthwaighte said: "I would so love everybody to get behind this campaign and the message of this song as it would illustrate to the world how the whole country endorses and celebrates the LGBT community and these reforms. I support equal rights for all Australians and I hope that is what 'Love Like This' and our video will say."

== Music video ==
The music video for "Love Like This" was directed by Jan Reichle and premiered on 27 January 2010. The video features cameo appearances from many Australian TV personalities, including Kylie Gillies and Richard Reid, all of whom are wearing a selection of "Wear It With Pride" T-shirts to support the campaign.

== Track listing ==
- Digital EP
1. "Love Like This" (Metrophonic Radio Mix) – 3:35
2. "Love Like This" (NRG-IZED Club Mix) – 7:26
3. "Love Like This" (Neon Charity Remix) – 5:43
4. "Love Like This" (Acappella) – 3:17
5. "Love Like This" (NRG-IZED Radio Mix) – 4:25
6. "Love Like This" (Neon Charity Instrumental) – 3:28

== Credits and personnel ==
Credits adapted from the liner notes of 1000 Stars.

Locations

- Recorded at the Metrophonic Studios in the United Kingdom.
- Mastered at Sterling Sound in New York City.

Personnel

- Songwriting – Paul Barry, Mark Taylor, Alex Smith
- Production – Brian Rawling, Alex Smith
- Mixing – Matt Furmidge
- Recording – Alex Smith
- Keys, guitars and programming – Alex Smith, Mark Taylor
- Backing vocals – Paul Barry, Cheryl Parker
- Mastering – Leon Zervos

== Charts ==
Chart (2010)	Peak position
Australia (ARIA)	88

== Release history ==
Country	Date	Format	Label
Australia	29 January 2010	Digital EP	Sony Music Australia
