= Someday Soon (Natalie Bassingthwaighte song) =

Single by Natalie Bassingthwaighte

from the album 1000 Stars
- Released: 8 December 2008
- Recorded: Metrophonic Studios (United Kingdom)
- Genre: Electropop; dance-pop
- Length: 4:13
- Label: Sony
- Songwriters: Natalie Bassingthwaighte; Paul Barry; Alex Smith
- Producers: Brian Rawling; Alex Smith

Natalie Bassingthwaighte singles chronology
"Alive" (2008)	"Someday Soon" (2008)	"1000 Stars" (2009)

"Someday Soon" is a song recorded by Australian singer and actress Natalie Bassingthwaighte. It was written by Bassingthwaighte, Alex Smith and Paul Barry, and produced by Smith and Brian Rawling. The song was released on 8 December 2008 as the second single from Bassingthwaighte's debut solo album 1000 Stars. Lyrically, "Someday Soon" is "an inspirational anthem about believing that anything is possible". Upon its release, the song peaked at number seven on the ARIA Singles Chart and was certified platinum by the Australian Recording Industry Association for sales exceeding 70,000 copies.

== Background and release ==
"Someday Soon" was written by Natalie Bassingthwaighte, Paul Barry and Alex Smith at Metrophonic Studios in the United Kingdom. The song's inspirational lyrics are "about believing that anything is possible". On 8 December 2008, "Someday Soon" was released as a digital extended play (EP), which included two Kaskade remixes of Bassingthwaighte's previous single "Alive" and an Electrodex remix of "Someday Soon". It was then sent to Australian radio stations on 15 December 2008. The EP was later released as a CD on 10 January 2009.

Upon its release, "Someday Soon" debuted at number nine on the ARIA Singles Chart on 19 January 2009, and peaked at number seven in its second week. The song spent its first eight weeks in the top ten. "Someday Soon" was certified platinum by the Australian Recording Industry Association for sales exceeding 70,000 copies.

== Promotion ==
Bassingthwaighte with nephew Logan in the "Someday Soon" music video.

Bassingthwaighte performed "Someday Soon" for the first time live during Australia's 2009 New Year's Eve party in Sydney. On 15 February 2009, she performed the song on Rove.

The music video for "Someday Soon" was directed by Gemma Lee and premiered on 19 December 2008. The video depicts Bassingthwaighte as an actress arriving on set to film a movie. It frequently cuts away to scenes with Bassingthwaighte getting her hair and make up done while reading a movie script and also singing in a room filled with lights. The video features Bassingthwaighte's nephew Logan Sheldrick, the eldest son of Bassingthwaighte's older sister Melinda, who plays a child actor. Actor Ben Tari also makes a cameo appearance in the video as the director.

== Track listing ==
- CD single / Digital EP
1. "Someday Soon" – 4:13
2. "Alive" (Kaskade Remix) – 5:34
3. "Alive" (Kaskade Radio Mix) – 3:33
4. "Someday Soon" (Electrodex Remix) – 5:04

== Credits and personnel ==
Credits adapted from the liner notes of 1000 Stars.

Locations

- Recorded at the Metrophonic Studios in the United Kingdom.
- Mastered at Sterling Sound in New York City.

Personnel

- Songwriting – Natalie Bassingthwaighte, Paul Barry, Alex Smith
- Production – Brian Rawling, Alex Smith
- Mixing – Matt Furmidge
- Recording – Alex Smith
- Keys, guitars and programming – Alex Smith
- Piano – Paul Barry
- All vocals – Natalie Bassingthwaighte
- Mastering – Leon Zervos

== Charts ==
=== Weekly charts ===
Chart (2009)	Peak position
Australia (ARIA)	7

=== Year-end charts ===
Chart (2009)	Rank
ARIA Singles Chart	55
ARIA Australian Artist Singles Chart	7

== Certifications ==
Region	Certification	Certified units/sales
Australia (ARIA)	Platinum	70,000^{^}
^{^} Shipments figures based on certification alone.

== Release history ==
Country	Date	Format	Label	Catalogue
Australia	8 December 2008	Digital EP	Sony Music Australia	
Australia	10 January 2009	CD	Sony Music Australia	88697444502
