= Cameron McGlinchey =

Australian drummer (born 1975)

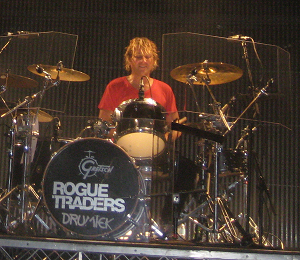
- Cameron McGlinchey performing with the Rogue Traders on the "Better in the Dark" tour

Background information
- Born: 19 September 1975 (age 51); Melbourne, Victoria, Australia
- Genres: Alternative rock, electronic
- Occupation: Drummer
- Instrument: Drums
- Label: Sony BMG

Cameron McGlinchey (born 19 September 1975) is an Australian drummer who serves as one of the members of the alternative rock band Rogue Traders. Originally, McGlinchey only played as a touring member, but by 2005, he joined as an official member. He was a member of Maeder and has previously toured with NoKTuRNL and former Young Talent Time singer Natalie Miller. McGlinchey left the Rogue Traders in 2008. Since he left the band, he has started going around for the Whitelion ROAR program.

He also drummed on Rogue Traders guitarist Tim Henwood's hard rock band Palace of the King's 2023 album Friends in Low Places, which was recorded in 2019.

== Personal life ==
McGlinchey was married to Rogue Traders lead singer Natalie Bassingthwaighte. On 16 August 2010, Bassingthwaighte gave birth to their first child, daughter Harper Rain Sinclair McGlinchey. In May 2013, their second child, a son named Hendrix John Hickson McGlinchey was born
