= Natalie Bassingthwaighte =

Australian singer, actress and television personality (born 1975)

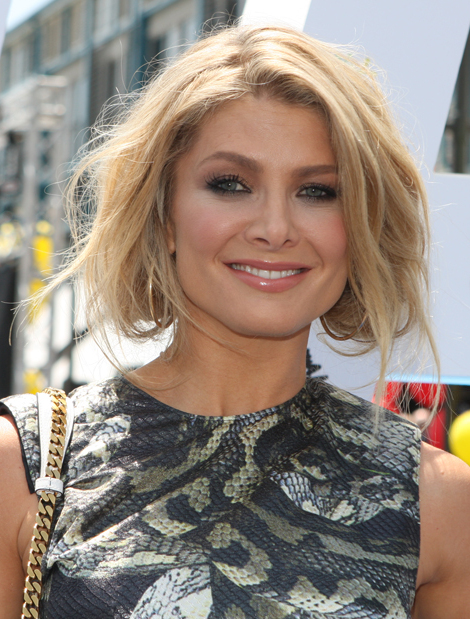
- Bassingthwaighte at the Sony Foundation Youth Cancer campaign, October 2012
- Born: 1 September 1975 (age 51); Wollongong, New South Wales, Australia
- Other name: Nat Bass
- Occupations: Singer; actress; television personality
- Years active: 1993–present
- Known for: Neighbours; So You Think You Can Dance Australia; The X Factor Australia
- Spouses: Graham Wilmott (m. 1998; div. 2000); Cameron McGlinchey (m. 2011; sep. 2023)
- Children: 2
- Musical career
- Genres: Pop; dance
- Instrument: Vocals
- Label: Sony
- Website: nataliebassingthwaighte.com

Natalie Bassingthwaighte (/ˈbæsɪŋθweɪt/; born 1 September 1975) is an Australian singer, actress and television personality. Born and raised in Wollongong, New South Wales, she began her career in musical theatre. She later pursued an acting career in 1998 with guest appearances in television shows. Bassingthwaighte rose to prominence in 2003 on the Australian soap opera Neighbours for her role as Izzy Hoyland, which earned her three Logie Award nominations.

In 2004, she was recruited as the lead singer of Australian electro-pop band, Rogue Traders. After leaving Neighbours in 2006 to focus on her music career, Bassingthwaighte released a cover of "Don't Give Up" with Shannon Noll, which peaked at number two on the ARIA Singles Chart and was certified platinum. In 2008, she left Rogue Traders to pursue her solo music career. Bassingthwaighte released her debut solo album 1000 Stars in 2009, which spawned the platinum top-ten hits "Alive" and "Someday Soon". The album was a commercial success, debuting at number one on the ARIA Albums Chart and was certified gold. After seven years away from Rogue Traders, Bassingthwaighte returned as the band's lead singer in 2015.

Aside from her acting and music career, Bassingthwaighte co-wrote her first book, Sistahood: A Journal of Self-Discovery, with her younger sister in 2008. That same year, she made her debut as a television presenter, hosting So You Think You Can Dance Australia for its first three seasons, which earned her another three Logie Award nominations. From 2011 to 2014, she was a judge and mentor on The X Factor Australia, and briefly joined The X Factor New Zealand in 2015. That same year, Bassingthwaighte launched her own children's clothing label, Chi Khi.

Bassingthwaighte has been married twice; in 1998 she married Graham Wilmott, a chef from Wollongong, for two years. In December 2011, she married her former Rogue Traders bandmate Cameron McGlinchey. The couple have two children, a daughter named Harper Rain Sinclair McGlinchey and a son named Hendrix John Hickson McGlinchey.

== Early life ==
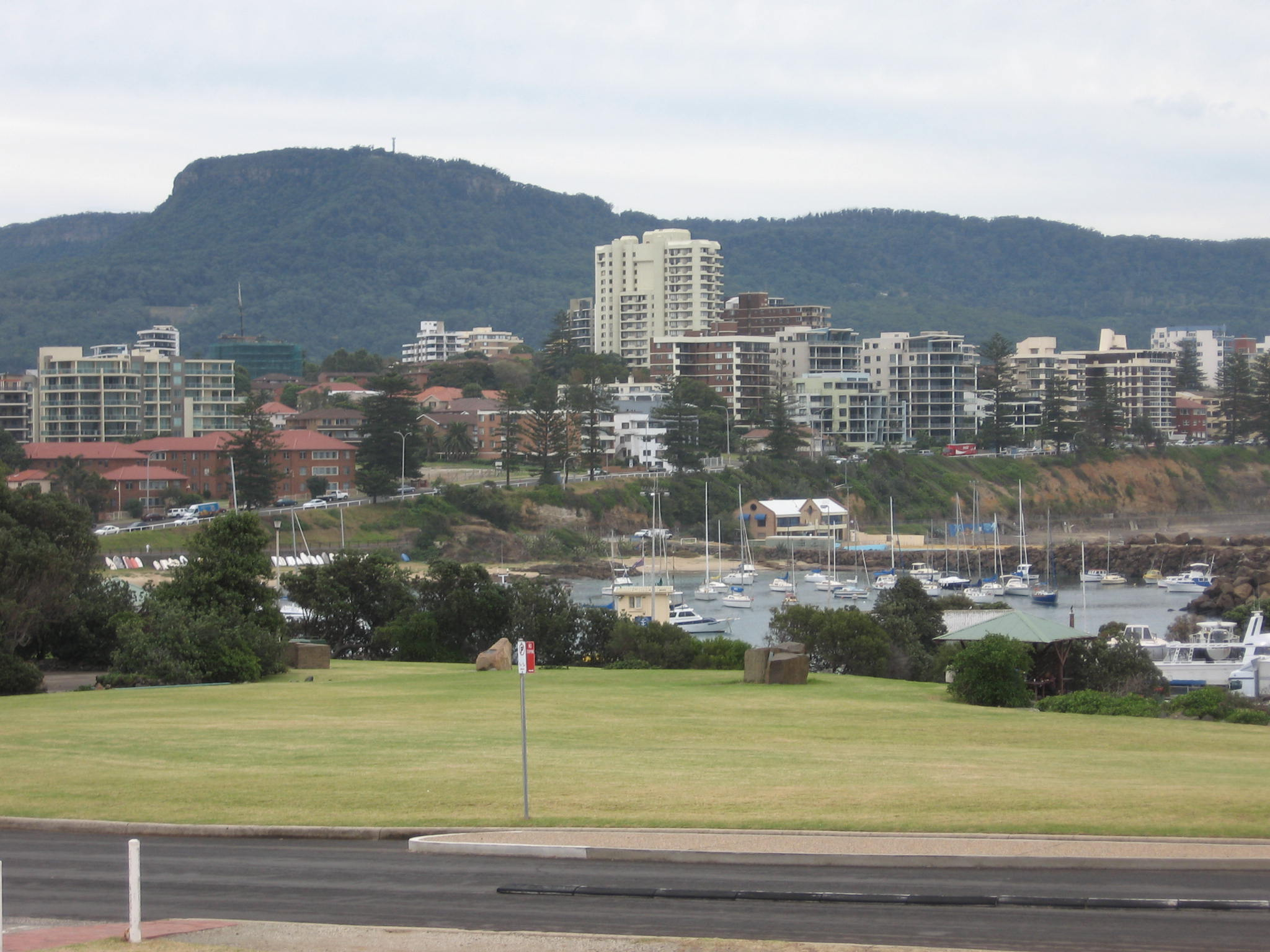
Wollongong, New South Wales, Australia, where Bassingthwaighte was born and raised.

Natalie Bassingthwaighte was born on 1 September 1975 in Wollongong, New South Wales, to Betty (born ca. 1953) and Michael Bassingthwaighte, AM, (born ca. 1952). Betty has worked as a theatre nurse. Since 1982 Michael has worked as the CEO of a health care insurance provider. Bassingthwaighte grew up in the suburb of Mount Warrigal as the second of four daughters with her older sister Melinda (born ca. 1974) and the twins, Lisa and Nicole (born ca. 1982). From a young age, she used to charge 20 cents for family and friends to come and see her dress up and put on mini concerts. Bassingthwaighte got her first role in a primary school production at Balarang Primary School of Peter Pan, playing the character Tinker Bell. She enrolled at Wollongong High School of the Performing Arts and graduated from the Australian College of Entertainment.

After college, Bassingthwaighte successfully auditioned for a job at a theme park, Wonderland Sydney. She participated in a variety of performances, including 1950s, 1970s, country and Hanna-Barbera shows. After working at Wonderland Sydney, Bassingthwaighte performed for two seasons as lead vocalist and stand-up comic at the Kaos Comedy Theatre restaurant in Sydney. During that time she auditioned for other musicals. Bassingthwaighte was chosen from over 6,000 people for the role as Mrs. Cohen in the Australian tour of the rock musical, Rent (1999). During Rent's tour, she auditioned for another stage production, Chicago. The casting directors were initially dubious given that she was not an A-List dancer, however she won the role of June and understudied the principal role of Roxie Hart. In 2002, during Chicago's run in Perth, Bassingthwaighte and some cast and crew members decided to visit The Pinnacles, a limestone formation and tourist attraction about 190 kilometres (120 mi) north-west of Perth. On the way there they became lost and their 4WD broke down; they were rescued by a Navy helicopter. Her first lead role was in the Asian production Chang & Eng, which depicts the biography of the first Siamese twins; Bassingthwaighte portrayed Adelaide Yates in both the Singapore and Bangkok seasons of the show.

== Music career ==
=== 2004–08: Rogue Traders ===
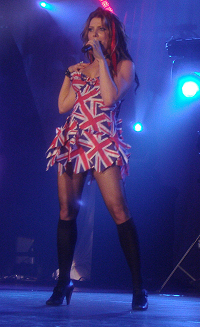
Bassingthwaighte in 2006, performing as part of the Rogue Traders.

Bassingthwaighte had considered a music career for some years and had been a member of an R&B group, but it did not work out, and her interest focused on other options. By 2004, she had begun working on her own demos: songs with an acoustic-rock sound and, later that year, she was recruited as the lead singer for Australian electro-pop band, Rogue Traders. Formed in 2002 with James Ash on keyboards and Steve Davis on guitars, the group had used a variety of guest vocalists and issued a debut album before seeking a permanent singer. After being presented with the band's music, Bassingthwaighte auditioned for Ash and Davis. The pair had auditioned 15 to 20 candidates, and after she performed their song "Voodoo Child", she became the band's front-woman.

In May 2005, the band released "Voodoo Child" as their fifth single—the first with Bassingthwaighte—which reached number four on the ARIA Singles Chart and was certified platinum for shipments of 70,000 units in Australia. "Voodoo Child" also reached number seven on the New Zealand Singles Chart, number three on the UK Singles Chart and number fifteen on the Irish Singles Chart. The single won the award for "Best Dance Video" at the 2006 MTV Australia Awards. The follow-up singles "Way to Go!" and "Watching You" also reached the ARIA top ten and both were certified gold for shipment of 35,000 units. In October 2005, Bassingthwaighte performed the Australian national anthem at the 2005 NRL Grand Final. Also that month Rogue Traders issued their second studio album, Here Come the Drums, which reached number two on the ARIA Albums Chart and spent a total of seventy-four weeks in the Top 50. It was certified 4× platinum and became their most successful album. The album received four nominations at the ARIA Music Awards of 2006 for "Breakthrough Artist – Album", "Best Pop Release", "Highest Selling Album" and "Best Group".

While Bassingthwaighte was still a member of Rogue Traders, she also made solo appearances and releases. In December 2006 she performed a duet with label mate Shannon Noll on their cover version of Peter Gabriel and Kate Bush's "Don't Give Up", for the various artists' album Home: Songs of Hope & Journey. Noll and Bassingthwaighte's version reached number two on the ARIA Singles Chart. She recorded "O Holy Night" for the album The Spirit of Christmas 2006, a Christmas compilation album for which all proceeds go to The Salvation Army in Australia. In 2007 Bassingthwaighte and Noll teamed up again for "Please Come Home for Christmas" on the album, The Spirit of Christmas 2007.

In October 2007 Rogue Traders released their third album, Better in the Dark, which spawned the hit singles "Don't You Wanna Feel" and "I Never Liked You"—both were certified gold, and "What You're On". The album debuted on the ARIA Albums Chart at number four and gained a platinum accreditation. For this album, Bassingthwaighte is credited as a co-composer for five of its twelve tracks, including all three singles. (Note: The five tracks from Better in the dark which are co-written by Natalie Bassingthwaighte are: 1. "Don't You Wanna Feel" (Jamie Appleby, Bassingthwaighte, Steve Davis, Dougal Drummond); 2. "I Never Liked You" (J Appleby, Melinda Appleby, Bassingthwaighte, Timothy Henwood); 3. "Candy Coloured Lights" (J Appleby, M Appleby, Bassingthwaighte); 4. "What You're On" (J Appleby, Bassingthwaighte, Davis); 5. "The Price We Pay" (J Appleby, M Appleby, Philip Appleby, Bassingthwaighte)) She worked with Ash and his wife Melinda Appleby on some tracks, "[w]e'd sit in a room and throw ideas around … It was interesting that all three of us instinctively knew when we had a great idea". At the APRA Awards of 2009, "Don't You Wanna Feel" was nominated as Dance Work of the Year. In June 2008, Bassingthwaighte left the group to pursue her solo career. She had signed a recording contract with Sony Music Australia in 2006 to embark on a solo career. In November 2009, Rogue Traders recruited Mindi Jackson as her replacement.

=== 2008–2024: 1000 Stars and subsequent ventures ===
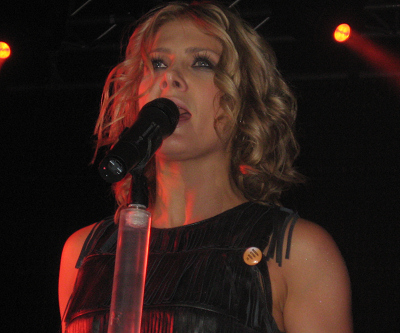
Bassingthwaighte performing in 2008.

In June 2008, Bassingthwaighte began working on her debut solo album, 1000 Stars. In October 2008, the album's lead single, "Alive", was released; it peaked at number eight on the ARIA Singles Chart and gained a platinum certificate. In January 2009, a second single, "Someday Soon", was issued which became Bassingthwaighte's third top-ten single on the ARIA Charts and was also certified platinum. The album was released on 20 February 2009, which debuted on the ARIA Albums Chart at number one and was certified gold.

In April 2009, the album's title track was released as the third single. It reached number thirty on the ARIA Singles Chart. "Not For You" was released in July 2009 as the fourth single and it failed to chart. The fifth single, "Love Like This", appeared in January 2010, which reached the Top 100. It was used to raise awareness by the Aids Council of New South Wales for the 'Wear It With Pride' T-shirt campaign in the lead-up to that year's Sydney Mardi Gras parade. For 1000 Stars, Bassingthwaighte co-composed seven of its fifteen tracks, including "Alive" and "Someday Soon". (Note: The seven tracks from 1000 Stars (2009) which are co-written by Bassingthwaighte are: 1. "Catch Me if You Can" (Bassingthwaighte, Paul Barry, Alex Smith); 2. "Someday Soon" (Bassingthwaighte, Barry, Smith); 3. "Alive" (Bassingthwaighte, Andrew Frampton, Arnthor Birgisson); 4. "Feel the Flow" (Bassingthwaighte, Cameron McGlinchey); 5. "Why Do I" (Bassingthwaighte, Stuart Critchton, Tommy Lee James); 6. "This Can't Be Love" (Bassingthwaighte, Jimmy Harry); 7. "In His Eyes" (Bassingthwaighte, Jay Levine))

In January 2011, Bassingthwaighte returned to theatre, performing at the Sydney Opera House, in Love, Loss and What I Wore, a play "about women, their relationships and memories", where she co-starred with Judi Farr, Mirrah Foulkes, Amanda Muggleton and Magda Szubanski. On 28 August 2011, Bassingthwaighte told The Daily Telegraph that she had recorded several new tracks, with her single "All We Have" expected to be released soon. She said, "Everything is coming together … I did lose my mojo for a while, I just didn't believe in doing something unless you're totally up for it. I wasn't feeling creative and then, suddenly, it was Christmas and it just felt right". "All We Have" was released in September 2011 and it failed to chart. In February 2012, Bassingthwaighte was announced as a Moomba Monarch alongside Harry Kewell, the Australian socceroo. In December 2014, Bassingthwaighte and other Australian singers recorded a cover version of Kate Bush's "This Woman's Work" under the name "Hope for Isla and Jude", and released it as a charity single to help raise funds for two siblings who suffer from the rare disease Sanfilippo syndrome. In September 2015, Bassingthwaighte reunited with her former band Rogue Traders, performing together for the first time in seven years, at a corporate show in Gold Coast. They later reunited again in December for a New Year's Eve show, where they hinted at the possibility of future shows, and confirmed that Bassingthwaighte's former replacement Mindi Jackson had given the band's reunion her blessing.

=== 2025–present: Reunification with Rogue Traders and autobiography ===
In late 2025, Rogue Traders announced a new album titled Midnight Alarms to be released in 2026 with Natalie Bassingthwaighte. In February 2026, the single "Take You Down" was released. Bassingthwaite is due to release an autobiography in April 2026.

== Television and film career ==
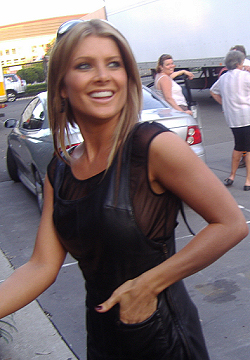
Bassingthwaighte in 2007

=== Acting ===
Bassingthwaighte's first television role as an actress was in a 1998 episode of the hospital-based drama series All Saints. In 2000, she had a guest appearance in an episode of The Lost World, playing the role of Raina. In 2003, Bassingthwaighte appeared in the telemovies The Mystery of Natalie Wood, and Counterstrike, playing the character of Kelly. The following year, she filmed a part in Rohan Spong's student film When Darkness Falls. She portrayed the character of Jinx De-Luxe, which involved a performance of the Marilyn Monroe song "Every Baby Needs a Da-da-daddy". She gained greater popular acclaim on the Australian soap opera Neighbours, playing the role of Izzy Hoyland from 2003 to 2006. This was her first full-time television role. Upon securing the role, she relocated from Sydney to Melbourne. Bassingthwaighte was nominated for a Gold Logie Award for Most Popular Personality and a Silver Logie Award for Most Popular Actress in 2006, for her role on the show. Bassingthwaighte left Neighbours in 2006 to focus on her music career and filmed her final scenes on 2 June 2006. In March 2007, she reprised her role as Izzy Hoyland in scenes shot while on location in London in November 2006. Bassingthwaighte received another nomination for Most Popular Actress at the 2007 Logie Awards. Bassingthwaighte appeared in a documentary special celebrating the show's 30th anniversary titled Neighbours 30th: The Stars Reunite, which aired in Australia and the United Kingdom in March 2015. She reprised her role as Izzy Hoyland for a guest appearance on Neighbours in February 2018, and was again back for the final episodes of the series in 2022.

In 2009, Bassingthwaighte starred in the Australian horror film Prey alongside Jesse Johnson, Christian Clark and Nicholas Bell, playing the role of Kate, an ambitious young surgeon working in the emergency department of a major city hospital. Part of the plot concerned three couples who become lost in outback Western Australia—Bassingthwaighte remembered similarities to her trip to The Pinnacles. The film was directed by George T. Miller and grossed $744 at the box office in Australia. In 2010, for a DVD release in the U.S., it was re-titled as The Outback. From April to June 2010, Bassingthwaighte starred in the 13-part television crime mini-series, Underbelly: The Golden Mile, playing the role of Maria Haken, the wife of Trevor Haken, who is a corrupt Kings Cross detective. The Hakens are a real-life couple, where the husband, Trevor, became an informant and witness at the Wood Royal Commission into police corruption. Bassingthwaighte's character was described as "the adulterous and neglected wife" and her husband's "drinking and neglect led [her] to begin an affair with another police officer". In 2016, Bassingthwaighte starred in the two-part miniseries Brock, based on the life of Australian motor racing driver Peter Brock, playing the role of Julie Bamford, Brock's girlfriend before he died. In September 2017, she appeared in the second season of the drama series The Wrong Girl, playing the recurring role of pastry chef Gillian.

On 25 March 2026, Bassingthwaighte was named in the cast for the film Love, Wine & Valentine.

=== Reality television ===
In 2008, Bassingthwaighte made her debut as a television presenter, hosting the Australian version of So You Think You Can Dance. She hosted the show for its first three seasons and received two nominations at the 2009 Logie Awards for a Gold Logie Award for Most Popular Personality and a Silver Logie Award for Most Popular Presenter. She received another nomination for Most Popular Presenter at the 2010 Logie Awards. In 2011, Bassingthwaighte replaced Natalie Imbruglia as a judge and mentor on the third season of The X Factor Australia. She also returned for the show's fourth, fifth and sixth seasons until Chris Isaak replaced her. In 2015, Bassingthwaighte replaced Natalia Kills midway through the second season of The X Factor New Zealand after Kills was fired from the show for humiliating a contestant from Melanie Blatt’s team. Bassingthwaite's (previously Kills’) contestant, Beau Monga, eventually won the series, making it her only win as a coach in the history of the franchise. Two years later, in 2017, she became a contestant on the third season of the reality series I'm a Celebrity...Get Me Out of Here! Australia, where she competed for her chosen charity, the Sister2Sister program for the Life Changing Experiences Foundation. Bassingthwaighte made it to the show's grand finale and placed third in the competition. In May 2024, Network 10 announced that Bassingthwaighte would appear on the forthcoming eighth season of The Amazing Race Australia as a celebrity contestant alongside her sister Melinda Sheldrick. It is the second celebrity season of the show.

== Theatre ==
Year	Title	Role	Notes
1998	Rent	Mark's Mum	Australian tour
2001	Grease: the Mega Musical	Pink Lady	
2002	Footloose	Ariel Moore	NSW
2005	Grease	Sandy	Grease: Arena Spectacular
2019	Chicago	Roxie Hart	Australian production (Sydney Theatre Awards nomination for Best Female Actor in a Musical)
2021	Chess	Florence Vassy	Australian production
2021	Jagged Little Pill	Mary Jane Healy	Australian production
2026	Waitress	Jenna Hunterson	Australian production

== Other ventures ==
In April 2008, Bassingthwaighte released her first book, Sistahood: A Journal of Self-Discovery. It was co-written, over two years, with her younger sister Nicole Moore, and is aimed at boosting teen and pre-teen girls' self-esteem. The book features activities and is filled with pictures of Bassingthwaighte's life with her three sisters: Moore, Lisa Fogarty and Melinda Sheldrick. In March–April 2012, Bassingthwaighte travelled to Bangladesh as an ambassador for Vicks Australia and Save the Children's project, Breathe for Life, which highlighted pneumonia-infected children and their parents' inability to afford health care. She encouraged fellow Australians to support the project to train health workers, village doctors and caregivers and reduce the impact of pneumonia. In March 2015, Bassingthwaighte launched her own children's clothing label, Chi Khi. The collection features natural bamboo cotton fabrics and clothing for both boys and girls aged zero to four. It was made available to buy online from 2 March 2015.

== Personal life ==
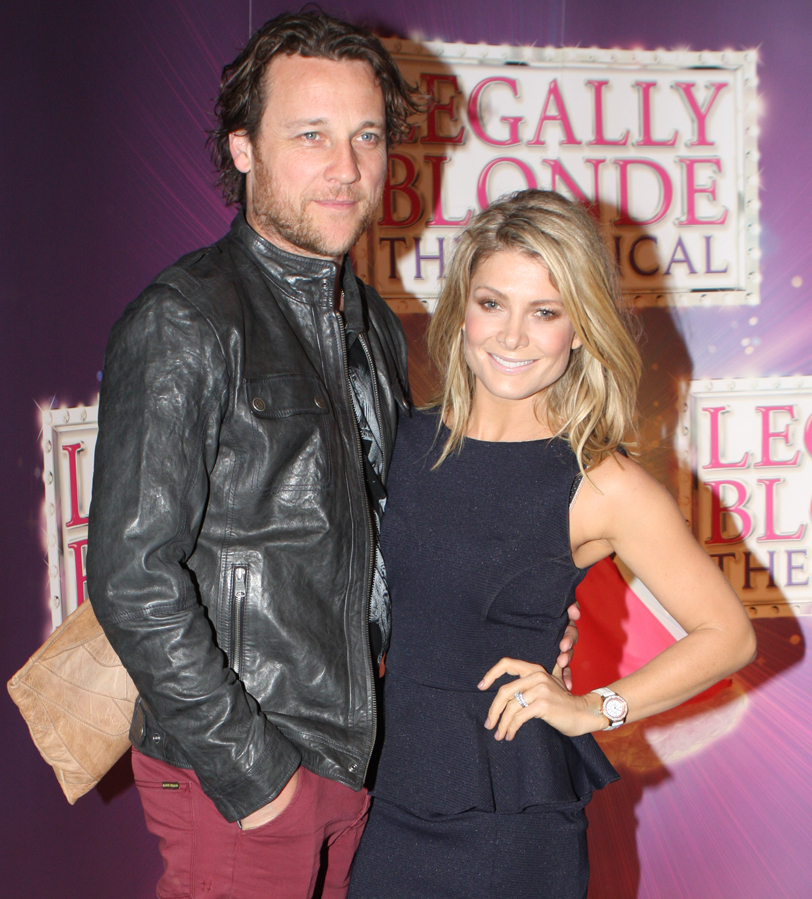
Bassingthwaighte with husband Cameron McGlinchey in October 2012.

Bassingthwaighte is often referred to as Nat Bass in the media and by fans. At 161 cm (5 ft 3 in), she is described as "pint-sized" and "tiny". During adolescence, Bassingthwaighte was bullied at school about her body shape and lack of development. In late 1998, she married Graham Wilmott, a chef from Wollongong; the couple were together for two years. Bassingthwaighte was in a six-month relationship with Big Brother 2001 contestant Gordon Sloan, which ended in mid-2005.

In 2010, Bassingthwaighte and her long-time boyfriend Cameron McGlinchey had a daughter. Bassingthwaighte and McGlinchey were married on 4 December 2011. In 2013, she gave birth to their second child, a son. The couple separated in August 2023.

In October 2025, Bassingthwaighte got engaged to her girlfriend Pip Loth, after proposing to her at Niagara Falls. The two publicly confirmed their relationship in November 2023. In an October 2025 interview with Sunrise, Bassingthwaighte stated that coming out was difficult and debilitating for her, being an older woman, before remarking that she never felt so comfortable in her own skin.

== Discography ==
=== Studio albums ===
LIst of solo albums, with selected peak chart positions and certifications
Title	Album details	Peak chart positions	Certifications
Title	Album details	AUS	Certifications
1000 Stars	Released: 20 February 2009; Label: Sony Music Australia; Formats: CD, digital download	1	ARIA: Gold

=== Singles ===
List of singles, with selected chart positions and certifications
Title	Year	Peak chart positions	Certifications	Album
Title	Year	AUS	Certifications	Album
"Don't Give Up" (with Shannon Noll)	2006	2	ARIA: Platinum	Home: Songs of Hope & Journey
"Alive"	2008	8	ARIA: Platinum	1000 Stars
"Someday Soon"	2009	7	ARIA: Platinum	1000 Stars
"1000 Stars"	2009	30		1000 Stars
"Not for You"	2009	—		1000 Stars
"Love Like This"	2010	88		1000 Stars
"All We Have"	2011	—		—N/a
"—" denotes a single that did not chart.

=== Music videos ===
List of music videos
Title	Year	Director(s)
"Don't Give Up" (with Shannon Noll)	2006	Mark Bliss
"Alive"	2008	Anthony Rose
"Someday Soon"	2009	Gemma Lee
"1000 Stars"	2009	Gemma Lee
"Not for You"	2009	Damon Escott and Stephen Lance
"Love Like This"	2010	Jan Reichle
"All We Have"	2011	Benn Jae

== Filmography ==
=== Film ===
Year	Title	Role	Notes
2006	When Darkness Falls	Jinx de Luxe	
2009	If at First You Don't Succeed	Sandra Hoyland (voice)	Short film
2009	Prey	Kate	
2016	Why Would I Lie?	Sara	Short film
2022	Elvis	Dee Stanley	
2024	Take My Hand	Rachel	
TBA	Love, Wine & Valentine	Sophie Bliss	Post-production
TBA	Zombie Plane	TBA	Post-production

=== Television ===
Year	Title	Role	Notes
1997	Heartbreak High	Young Girl Singer	TV series
1998	All Saints	Young Deidre Macken	TV series
2000	The Lost World	Raina	TV series
2002	Counterstrike	Kelly Kellogg	TV film
2003–2007, 2018, 2022	Neighbours	Izzy Hoyland	TV series, main cast
2004	The Mystery of Natalie Wood	Marion Marshall	TV film
2006	Stupid, Stupid Man	Sandy Clarke	TV series
2008–2009	So You Think You Can Dance Australia	Host	TV series
2010	Underbelly: The Golden Mile	Maria Haken	TV series
2011–2014	The X Factor Australia	Judge / Mentor	TV series, seasons 3–6
2015	Neighbours 30th: The Stars Reunite	Herself	TV documentary
2015	The X Factor New Zealand	Judge / Mentor	TV series, season 2
2016	Brock	Julie Bamford	TV miniseries
2017	I'm a Celebrity...Get Me Out of Here! Australia	Contestant	TV series, season 3
2017	The Wrong Girl	Gillian	TV series, season 2
2018	Show Me the Movie!	Guest Panellist	TV series
2019	Changing Rooms	Host	TV series
2019	Hughesy, We Have a Problem	Celebrity Problem	TV series
2019	Celebrity Name Game	Contestant	TV series
2019	Australia's Got Talent	Guest Judge	TV series
2023	Luxury Escapes: The World's Best Holidays	Herself	TV series
2024	The Amazing Race Australia	Contestant	TV series, season 8
2025	Darby and Joan	Shelley Slater	TV series
2026	Celebrity SAS: Who Dares Wins	Contestant	TV series, series 8

== Awards and nominations ==
Year	Type	Award	Work	Result
2004	Inside Soap Awards	Best Newcomer (Izzy Hoyland)	Neighbours	Nominated
2004	Inside Soap Awards	Best Bitch (Izzy Hoyland)	Neighbours	Nominated
2005	Inside Soap Awards	Best Actress	Neighbours	Nominated
2005	Inside Soap Awards	Best Bitch (Izzy Hoyland)	Neighbours	Nominated
2005	Inside Soap Awards	Best Storyline (Susan, Karl and Izzy love triangle)	Neighbours	Nominated
2006	Inside Soap Awards	Best Bitch (Izzy Hoyland)	Neighbours	Nominated
2006	Inside Soap Awards	Best Couple (Paul Robinson and Izzy Hoyland)	Neighbours	Nominated
2006	Logie Awards	Most Popular Personality (Gold Logie)	Neighbours	Nominated
2006	Logie Awards	Most Popular Actress	Neighbours	Nominated
2006	Dolly Teen Choice Awards	Best Slashie	Neighbours	Won
2007	Logie Awards	Most Popular Actress	Neighbours	Nominated
2007	Inside Soap Awards	Best Bitch (Izzy Hoyland)	Neighbours	Nominated
2007	Nickelodeon Australian Kids' Choice Awards	Fave Hottie	Herself	Nominated
2007	ARIA Music Awards	Highest Selling Single	"Don't Give Up"	Nominated
2008	Digital Spy Soap Awards	Storyline of the Year (Karl, Susan and Izzy in London)	Neighbours	Nominated
2009	Logie Awards	Most Popular Personality (Gold Logie)	So You Think You Can Dance Australia	Nominated
2009	Logie Awards	Most Popular Presenter	So You Think You Can Dance Australia	Nominated
2009	ARIA No. 1 Chart Awards	Number One Album	1000 Stars	Won
2009	APRA Awards	Dance Work of the Year	"Don't You Wanna Feel"	Won
2009	Nickelodeon Australian Kids' Choice Awards	Fave Aussie Singer	Herself	Nominated
2009	Nickelodeon Australian Kids' Choice Awards	Fave TV Star	So You Think You Can Dance Australia	Nominated
2010	Logie Awards	Most Popular Presenter	So You Think You Can Dance Australia	Nominated
2011	Nickelodeon Australian Kids' Choice Awards	Hall of Slime	Herself	Nominated
2011	Poprepublic.tv IT List Awards	Australian Female Artist	Herself	Nominated
2011	Poprepublic.tv IT List Awards	Single of 2011	"All We Have"	Nominated
