= Rogue Traders discography =

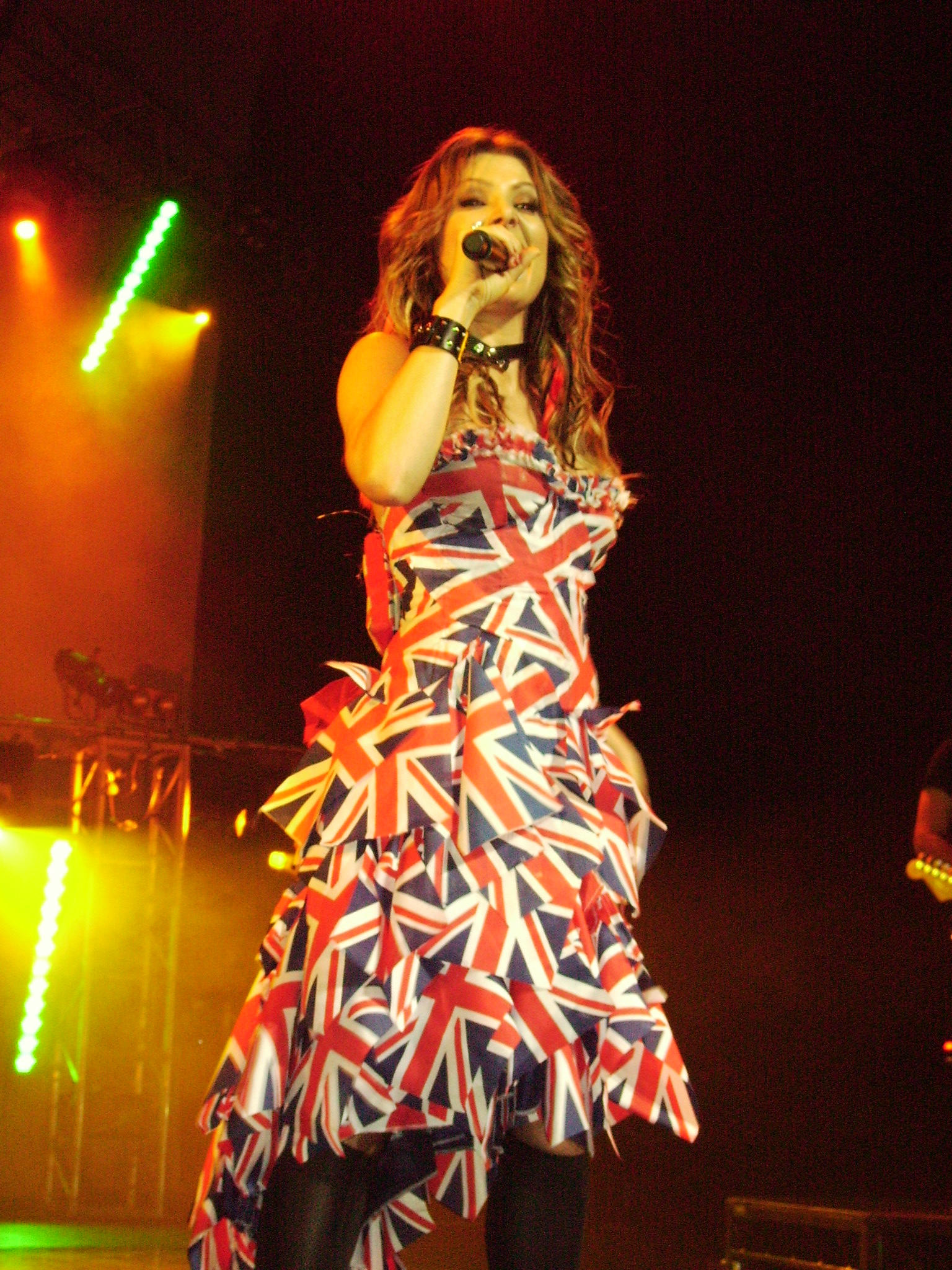
- Lead singer Natalie Bassingthwaighte performing with the group in 2006.
- Studio albums: 5
- Compilation albums: 1
- Singles: 21
- Remixes: 6

The discography of an Australian electropunk group Rogue Traders consists of five studio albums, one compilation album, and seventeen singles under Vicious Grooves and Sony BMG. Rogue Traders were formed in Melbourne, Australia in 2000 by DJs James Ash and Steve Davis. Their debut album We Know What You're Up To was released in May 2003, over a full year after the release of the original lead single "Need You to Show Me", which failed to chart and was not included on the released album. The following single, "Give in to Me" also failed to gain success, peaking at #67 on the ARIA Singles Chart, however the next single, "One of My Kind", a remix of "Need You Tonight" by INXS scored the band-then-duo their first top ten position, peaking at #10 on the ARIA Singles Chart, and won the award for "Best Dance Track" at the 2003 ARIA Music Awards. The following single, "Stay?", failed to reach the success of its preceding single, as did the album, We Know What You're Up To, peaking at #60 and failing to chart, respectively.

After a significant line-up change, the band released the single "Voodoo Child" with new lead singer Natalie Bassingthwaighte. The song proved to be their best-selling single to date, reaching #4 on the ARIA Singles Chart and was accredited Platinum in Australia for shipments of 70,000. "Voodoo Child" was later released internationally throughout 2006 and 2007, however it failed to reach to reach the same success as in the band's native Australia, except in the UK, where it peaked at #3 and was certified Silver for shipments of 200,000 by the British Phonographic Industry. The song was also notably featured in a 2007 episode of Doctor Who, "The Sound of Drums". The single was taken off the band's second studio album, Here Come the Drums, which was released in October 2005 in Australia, where it was a large commercial success, peaking at #2 and was certified 4× Platinum for shipments of 280,000. The album remained in the Top 50 Albums Chart for seventy-four weeks throughout 2005, 2006, and 2007, and was nominated for four ARIA Music Awards. "Way to Go!" was released as the album's second single in Australia, where it peaked at #7 and was certified Gold, whilst "Watching You" was released as the second single in UK, where in comparison to "Voodoo Child" it was a commercial disappointment, peaking at #33. It fared better in Australia, where it was released as the album's third single, and peaked at #5 and was certified Gold. "Way to Go!" was slightly remixed for its release in the UK as the album's third single, however it failed to appear on the Top 200. "We're Coming Home" was released as the album's fourth and final single exclusively in Australia, where it peaked at #14. "In Love Again" was released exclusively to radio as a promotional single in late 2006.

The band released their third studio album, Better in the Dark, in Australia in October 2007 to moderate commercial success, peaking at #4 and was certified Platinum. The album was preceded by the single "Don't You Wanna Feel", which debuted and peaked at #10 and was certified Gold. The following single, "I Never Liked You", peaked at #9 and was also certified Gold, whilst the album's third and final single, "What You're On", peaked at #30. Following this, Bassingthwaighte left the band. After a brief hiatus through 2008 and 2009, the band revealed their new lead singer, Melinda "Mindi" Jackson, and released their first single with her, "Love Is a War", in December 2009 from their fourth studio album, Night of the Living Drums. However, "Love Is a War" and the following single, "Would You Raise Your Hands?", were both commercial disappointments, peaking at #90 and #95 respectively, and also were received negatively by the general public and by music critics. The single "Hearts Beat as One" was released as the official anthem for the Socceroos for the 2010 FIFA World Cup. It failed to chart, their first single to do so since 2002, and subsequently, the album Night of the Living Drums, which had been scheduled for release in June 2010, was delayed indefinitely, and Rogue Traders were dropped from Sony Records. Shortly after this, the band split. Their fourth studio album and greatest hits compilation, The Sound of Drums, was released in November 2011 for the band's tenth anniversary.

== Albums ==
=== Studio albums ===
Title	Album details	Peak chart positions		Certifications
Title	Album details	AUS	UK	Certifications
We Know What You're Up To	Released: 5 May 2003; Label: Vicious Grooves; Formats: CD, digital download	—	—	
Here Come the Drums	Released: 23 October 2005; Label: Columbia, Sony BMG; Formats: CD, digital download	2	46	ARIA: 4× Platinum
Better in the Dark	Released: 13 October 2007; Label: Columbia, Sony BMG; Formats: CD, digital download	4	—	ARIA: Platinum
Night of the Living Drums (Note: The Sound of Drums was released as a double disc set which includes The Greatest Hits and Night of the Living Drums.)	Released: 11 November 2011; Label: Sony, Columbia; Formats: CD, digital download	—	—	
Midnight Alarms	Released: 5 June 2026; Label: Sony, Universal; Formats: CD, digital download	53	—	
"—" denotes a recording that did not chart or was not released in that territory.

=== Compilation albums ===
Title	Album details
The Sound of Drums	Released: 11 November 2011; Label: Sony, Columbia; Formats: CD, digital download

== Singles ==
List of singles, with selected chart positions, showing year released and album name
Title	Year	Peak chart positions				Certifications	Album
Title	Year	AUS	IRL	NZ	UK	Certifications	Album
"Need You to Show Me"	2002	—	—	—	—		Non-album single
"Give in to Me"	2002	67	—	—	—		We Know What You're Up To
"One of My Kind" (Rogue Traders vs. INXS)	2003	10	—	—	—		We Know What You're Up To
"Stay?"	2003	60	—	—	—		We Know What You're Up To
"Voodoo Child"	2005	4	15	7	3	ARIA: Platinum; BPI: Silver	Here Come the Drums
"Way to Go!"	2005	7	—	—	—	ARIA: Gold	Here Come the Drums
"Watching You"	2006	5	46	—	33	ARIA: Gold	Here Come the Drums
"We're Coming Home"	2006	14	—	—	—		Here Come the Drums
"In Love Again"	2006	— (Note: "In Love Again" was released as a radio promotional single, and was ineligible to chart in Australia in 2006. It did peak at number 20 on the ARIA Digital Track Chart.)	—	—	—		Here Come the Drums
"Don't You Wanna Feel"	2007	10	—	—	—	ARIA: Gold	Better in the Dark
"I Never Liked You"	2008	9	—	—	—	ARIA: Gold	Better in the Dark
"What You're On"	2008	30	—	—	—		Better in the Dark
"Love Is a War"	2009	90	—	—	—		Night of the Living Drums
"Would You Raise Your Hands?"	2010	95	—	—	—		Night of the Living Drums
"Hearts Beat as One"	2010	— (Note: "Hearts Beat as One" did not enter the ARIA Singles Chart, but did peak at number 15 on the ARIA Physical Singles Chart.)	—	—	—		Non-album singles
"In Love Again 2021"	2021	—	—	—	—		Non-album singles
"To the Disco"	2023	—	—	—	—		Non-album singles
"Take You Down"	2026	—	—	—	—		Midnight Alarms
"Love Drunk"	2026	—	—	—	—		Midnight Alarms
"Next Words"	2026	—	—	—	—		Midnight Alarms
"Animals"	2026	—	—	—	—		Midnight Alarms
"Dirty Dirty Disco" (with Dannii Minogue)	2026	—	—	—	— (Note: "Dirty Dirty Disco" did not enter the UK Singles Chart Top 100, but debuted at number 18 on the UK Singles Sales Chart.)		
"—" denotes items which were not released in that country or failed to chart.

== Music videos ==
Title	Year	Director
"Need You to Show Me"	2002	Max Bourke
"Give in to Me"	2002	
"One of My Kind" (Rogue Traders vs. INXS)	2003	Sam Bennetts
"Stay?"	2003	Sam Bennetts
"Voodoo Child"	2005	Sam Bennetts
"Way to Go!"	2005	Nicholas Wrathall
"Way to Go!" (UK version/Metro Radio Mix)		Owen Trevor
"Watching You"	2006	Sam Bennetts
"We're Coming Home"	2006	Keir McFarlane
"In Love Again"	2006	
"Don't You Wanna Feel"	2008	Owen Trevor
"I Never Liked You"	2008	Marc Furmie
"What You're On"	2008	Gemma Lee
"Love Is a War"	2009	Marc Furmie
"Would You Raise Your Hands?"		

== Remixes ==
These songs have been remixed by Rogue Traders.

Year	Song	Artist
2003	"Obsession (I Love You)" (Rogue Traders 7" version)	Amiel
2003	"Do Me Wrong" (Rogue Traders Denim Tribute mix)	Melanie Blatt
2003	"The Switch" (Rogue Traders mix)	Planet Funk
2004	"Fork in the Road" (Rogue Traders 12" remix)	1200 Techniques
2004	"I've Got Your Number" (Rogue Traders remix)	Cheyne
2006	"Love Declaration" (Rogue Traders Vocoder dub)	Paul Mac featuring Aaradhna
