= The Sound of Drums (album) =

Studio album / Greatest hits by Rogue Traders
- Released: 11 November 2011
- Recorded: 2004–2006 (TSOD); 2009 (NOTLD)
- Genre: Electronic rock, dance-pop, alternative rock
- Length: 62:16 (CD 1); 47:05 (CD 2)
- Label: Columbia
- Producer: James Ash

Rogue Traders chronology
Better in the Dark (2007)	The Sound of Drums (2011)

Singles from Night of the Living Drums
- 1. "Love Is a War" Released: 25 December 2009; 2. "Would You Raise Your Hands?" Released: 12 March 2010

The Sound of Drums is a double album by Australian electronic rock band Rogue Traders, including their debut compilation album The Greatest Hits and the fourth studio album Night of the Living Drums. The album did not chart in Australia. The album's title is a reference to the Doctor Who episode of the same name, which featured "Voodoo Child" prominently.

== Background ==
Night of the Living Drums was initially set for release on 25 June 2010, however due to certain unknown reasons and troubles with the record label Sony Music the album was not released that year.

The album is the first release from the band with new lead singer Mindi Jackson who replaced Natalie Bassingthwaighte after the latter departed the band in 2009. The album also features a new drummer Peter Marin and the return of guitarist Tim Henwood, who left the band during 2008.

On October 24, 2011, the band posted on Facebook that the album would be released as the second disc of a double-disc titled The Sound of Drums. The first disc is a greatest hits compilation. "I'll Be Your Stalker" and "Hearts Beat as One", although being recorded for the album, did not make an appearance on the album's track list and were included on single releases.

== Track listing ==
The Greatest Hits (CD 1)
No.	Title	Writer(s)	Length
1.	"Voodoo Child"	Elvis Costello, Jamie Appleby, Steve Davis	3:58
2.	"I Never Liked You"	J. Appleby, Melinda Appleby, Tim Henwood, Natalie Bassingthwaighte	3:29
3.	"In Love Again"	J. Appleby, M. Appleby, Curt Smith, Roland Orzabal	5:13
4.	"Watching You"	Doug Fieger, Berton Averre, J. Appleby, M. Appleby	3:29
5.	"Don't You Wanna Feel"	Davis, J. Appleby, Bassingthwaighte, Dougal Drummond	3:17
6.	"On Your Way to the Disco"	J. Appleby	4:04
7.	"Way to Go!"	J. Appleby, Isaac Moran	3:16
8.	"White Lightning"	J. Appleby, Davis	4:10
9.	"Candy Coloured Lights"	J. Appleby, M. Appleby, Bassingthwaighte	4:19
10.	"Overload"	J. Appleby, Melinda Richards, Davis	4:36
11.	"What You're On"	J. Appleby, Bassingthwaighte, Davis	4:56
12.	"We're Coming Home"	J. Appleby, M. Appleby	3:22
13.	"Stay?"	J. Appleby	5:36
14.	"One of My Kind"	Andrew Farriss, Michael Hutchence, Davis, J. Appleby	4:20
Total length:			62:16

Physical bonus track
No.	Title	Writer(s)	Length
15.	"Give In to Me"	J. Appleby, Davis, Richards	4:15

iTunes bonus track
No.	Title	Writer(s)	Length
15.	"Better In the Dark"	J. Appleby	3:50

Night of the Living Drums (CD 2)
No.	Title	Writer(s)	Length
1.	"Nightfall"	Jamie Appleby, Melinda Appleby	0:42
2.	"Would You Raise Your Hands?"	J. Appleby, M. Appleby, Adam Ant, Marco Pirroni	3:26
3.	"Forever Love Have Vision"	J. Appleby, Melinda Jackson, Steve Davis, Tim Henwood, M. Appleby	3:48
4.	"If You Wanna Taste It"	J. Appleby, Jackson	3:21
5.	"Ease Your Mind"	M. Appleby, J. Appleby, Davis	3:33
6.	"Don't Think I Love You"	J. Appleby, M. Appleby	4:02
7.	"Skyline"	J. Appleby, M. Appleby	3:37
8.	"Like It Ends Tonight"	J. Appleby, M. Appleby, Jackson	4:15
9.	"Love Is a War"	Pete Shelley, Howard Devoto, J. Appleby, M. Appleby, Elliot Gleave, Jackson	3:33
10.	"So Alive"	Jackson	1:13
11.	"So Lonely"	J. Appleby, M. Appleby	3:57
12.	"Sign Language"	J. Appleby, M. Appleby	3:44
13.	"America"	J. Appleby, M. Appleby, Henwood	4:35
14.	"Girl in Gold"	J. Appleby	3:29
Total length:			47:05
