= Sound of Drums =

Sound of Drums may refer to:

- "The Sound of Drums", an episode of the TV programme Doctor Who
- "Sound of Drums", a song on Kula Shaker's 1999 album Peasants, Pigs & Astronauts
- The Sound of Drums (album), a compilation album by the Rogue Traders
