= Better in the Dark =

Studio album by Rogue Traders
- Released: 13 October 2007
- Genres: Alternative dance, pop rock, electropop
- Length: 48:08
- Label: Columbia
- Producer: James Ash

Rogue Traders chronology
Here Come the Drums (2005)	Better in the Dark (2007)	The Sound of Drums (2011)

Singles from Better in the Dark
- 1. "Don't You Wanna Feel" Released: 29 September 2007; 2. "I Never Liked You" Released: 14 January 2008; 3. "What You're On" Released: 19 April 2008

Better in the Dark is the third studio album by Rogue Traders. It was released in Australia by Columbia Records on 13 October 2007 (see 2007 in music). The album was produced by band member James Ash – who has also produced the band's previous albums and the lead singer Natalie Bassingthwaighte described the album as a step up, a bit older and more grown-up. Better in the Dark debuted in the top ten on the Australian ARIA Albums Chart and is their second highest-selling album to date. The album has yielded three singles: "Don't You Wanna Feel", "I Never Liked You" and "What You're On". The album was never released in the UK, although the album was released in China, with "Voodoo Child" replacing "Better in the Dark" and the word "Traders" being removed from the front cover.

== Content and writing ==
Band member Ash states that on this album they are more of a band and he felt the previous album was a studio record due to this album not having any samples. The band did not want to repeat themselves, with Ash stating "We have a sound that is ours, and we had to be mindful we didn't lose any of our fans. So for us, 'Better in the Dark' is about growth, not reinvention."

Lead singer Bassingthwaighte became part of the songwriting process on the album, co-writing on many of the songs with Ash and his wife Melinda Appleby. Bassingthwaighte states "We'd sit in a room and throw ideas around. It was interesting that all three of us instinctively knew when we had a great idea." Ash states that many of the songs on the album seem to be about being in nightclubs and he did not realise that until they finished recording it, hence the title Better in the Dark.

== Commercial performance ==
In October 2007, the first single "Don't You Wanna Feel" was released and spent a total of 14 weeks inside the ARIA top 50 singles chart, peaking at 10, and being accredited Gold.

The success of Here Come the Drums was not repeated despite positive reviews of the album. The album debuted at No. 4 on the ARIA Albums chart. It fell out of top 50 after six weeks, although it was certified Gold in its fourth week. Three weeks after exiting top 50 it re-entered at No. 48, and spent a further 15 weeks inside top 50. After exiting again it re-entered at No. 46, spending its final week (23rd overall) in the top 50. The album received a Platinum certification and has sold roughly 100,000 copies in Australia, compared to Here Come the Drums, which was certified 4× Platinum (280,000).

The second single "I Never Liked You" was released in January and debuted at No. 11 on the ARIA Singles Chart. It jumped to its peak of No. 9 the next week, and continued to slowly fall out of the chart in the following weeks. It was certified Gold in June 2008.

The third single "What You're On" debuted and peaked at No. 30 on the ARIA Singles Chart in late April 2008. It subsequently fell slowly out of the chart, spending a total of 7 weeks inside the top 50.

== Track listing ==
1. "Calling All Lovers" (Jamie Appleby, Melinda Appleby) – 4:01
2. "Don't You Wanna Feel" (Appleby, Natalie Bassingthwaighte, Steve Davis, Dougal Drummond) – 3:16
3. "I Never Liked You" (Appleby, Appleby, Bassingthwaighte, Timothy Henwood) – 3:29
4. "Candy Coloured Lights" (Appleby, Appleby, Bassingthwaighte) – 4:18
5. "Speak & Destroy" (Appleby, Appleby) – 3:47
6. "Childlike" (Appleby) – 4:26
7. "On Your Way to the Disco" (Appleby) – 4:02
8. "8th Wonder of the World" (Appleby) – 3:16
9. "Better in the Dark" (Appleby) – 3:52
10. "What You're On" (Appleby, Bassingthwaighte, Davis) – 4:56
11. "Throw Your Arms Around Me" (Appleby, Appleby) – 4:49
12. "The Price We Pay" (Appleby, Appleby, Appleby, Bassingthwaighte) – 4:01
- On the China/Hong Kong edition, the track "Better in the Dark" was omitted due to restrictions. Instead, "Voodoo Child" was included as a bonus track.

Limited edition bonus DVD All footage recorded live at The Chapel in Australia.

1. "Don't You Wanna Feel"
2. "I Never Liked You"
3. "What You're On"
4. "Better in the Dark"
5. "In Love Again"
6. "Voodoo Child"

== Charts ==
=== Weekly charts ===
Chart (2007)	Peak position
Australian Albums Chart (ARIA)	4

=== Year end charts ===
Chart (2007)	Position
Australian Albums Chart (ARIA)	85

== Certification ==
Region	Certification	Certified units/sales
Australia (ARIA)	Platinum	70,000^{^}
^{^} Shipments figures based on certification alone.

== Release history ==
The album was released in two versions: a single-disc edition, and a double-disc edition. The first disc includes the standard album. The second disc, a DVD-Video, contains six live high definition performances filmed live at the Chapel in 5.1 surround sound. The double-disc edition was limited to several thousand copies.

Country	Date	Label	Format	Catalog
Australia	13 October 2007	Columbia Records	CD	88697173392
Australia	13 October 2007	Columbia Records	CD / DVD	88697173412
