= Here Come the Drums =

Studio album by Rogue Traders
- Released: 23 October 2005
- Recorded: 2005
- Studio: Twang Vicarage
- Genre: Electronic rock, dance-pop, alternative rock
- Length: 44:45
- Label: Columbia
- Producer: James Ash

Rogue Traders chronology
| We Know What You're Up To (2003) | Here Come the Drums (2005) | Better in the Dark (2007) |

Singles from Here Come the Drums
- 1. "Voodoo Child" Released: 27 May 2005; 2. "Way to Go!" Released: 9 October 2005; 3. "Watching You" Released: 29 January 2006; 4. "We're Coming Home" Released: 10 June 2006; 5. "In Love Again" Released: August 2006 (radio promo)

Professional ratings
Review scores
| Source | Rating |
|---|---|
| AllMusic | 3.5/5 stars |
| Teentoday.co.uk | 4/5 stars |

Here Come the Drums is the second studio album by Australian band Rogue Traders, released in Australia on 23 October 2005 by Columbia Records. The album features the band with the then-new vocalist Natalie Bassingthwaighte, and songs primarily in the genre of dance-pop, written by Jamie Appleby, Steven Davis, and Melinda Appleby. Here Come the Drums debuted in the top ten on the Australian ARIA Albums Chart.

Four singles were released from the album, all of which peaked within the top 20. "Voodoo Child", the most successful song from the album peaked in the top ten in Australia, New Zealand and the United Kingdom. Other singles include "Way to Go!", "Watching You", and "We're Coming Home". "In Love Again" was later released exclusively as a radio single. The commercial success of the album led to the We're Coming Home National Tour in 2006 and nominations for seven ARIA Music Awards. The album's title comes from a line in "Voodoo Child".

== Content ==
The album was two years in the making, is self-produced and self-written and marks a change of genre for the band. The making of the album started in October 2003 when the band won an ARIA Award for Best Dance Release with their remix of the INXS song "Need You Tonight". Band members James Ash and Steve Davis were happy with the acknowledgment, but they both wondered if they would ever get such success again, so they decided that they were going to be known for their own material. The album, unlike their first album, includes live instrumentation; live drums, live guitars and bass, performed by the same musicians who played live with the band. Ash stated that "We were at a point where we felt that we had gone as far as we could go with conventional dance music. And we wanted to have a sound that broke out of it. At that time dance music was taking itself very seriously and the music that we'd really been enjoying for the past couple of years had been rock acts. They had loads of energy, but they also had amazing production and really big melodies and the musical depth that I was after".

"We love our rock music and we love our electronic music and on this album we're meeting right in the middle", says Ash. "We're making music that will work on the dance floor and on radio. We're not afraid to have a pop influence, but we also wanted attitude. So that's why I'd say the Sex Pistols are the single biggest influence on the album. They were about energy and it's exciting to listen to them".

Change of their sound also came when in 2004, the band held auditions for a new lead vocalist. Australian actor Natalie Bassingthwaighte auditioned and the band accepted her; she began working with them straight away. Bassingthwaighte stated: "I wanted to bring my personality into the band. I wanted to colour it, to make it very rock, but also make the vocals very character based. I can be very outrageous, and the songs let me go out there and just explode". She became the lead vocalist on every track on the album except "Casting Aside", which is sung by Ash.

== Promotion and chart performance ==
The album's promotion began when the album's first single "Voodoo Child" was released to radio across Australia. At first Bassingthwaighte's involvement with the band was kept quiet because Ash did not want people to buy their music for the "celebrity value". "Voodoo Child" was a top ten hit, peaking at number four on the Australian ARIA Singles Chart. The success of "Voodoo Child" under their belt, the band were set to release their second single "Way to Go!" on 9 October 2005. The music video for the song was filmed on 6 August 2005; the winners of a competition also appeared as extras in the video. The song became the band's third top ten hit, peaking at number seven in Australia. Rogue Traders also supported Kelly Clarkson when she came to Australia, and performed "Voodoo Child" at the nineteenth annual ARIA Awards.

The album debuted on the Australian ARIA Albums Chart on 31 October 2005 at number nine, making it their first top ten album. The album fell down the chart until its tenth week, when it began to rise again. It stayed in the top ten for fourteen consecutive weeks, peaking at number two twice (being held off the top spot by Face to Face by Westlife and Back to Bedlam by James Blunt). The album spent numerous more weeks in the top fifty, re-entering twice for a total of seventy weeks in the top fifty. It became the eightieth-highest selling album in Australia for 2005, the sixth-highest selling album for 2006 and was certified four times platinum by ARIA. The album re-entered the top fifty albums chart again on 8 October 2007 (with the release of their third album), nearly two years after being released. The album has overall spent seventy-four weeks in the Australian charts. It has also been rated the 45th best album of all time in Australia. The album debuted at number 46 on the UK Albums Chart, and dropped off the following week. A limited number of copies were released in New Zealand.

"Watching You", which notably sampled the guitar riff of "My Sharona" by The Knack, and "We're Coming Home" were released as the third and fourth singles from the album and followed the success of the previous singles, both peaking in the top ten and twenty respectively in Australia. However, while "Watching You" was certified Gold for sales of 35,000, "We're Coming Home" failed to gain an accreditation. On 1 July 2006 they became the second band in history to play in the house of Big Brother Australia. They performed four songs for the housemates; "We're Coming Home", "Way to Go!", "Believer" and "Fashion". The success of the band's music in Australia led to their music being released in the United Kingdom. "Voodoo Child" was released on 10 July 2006 and they toured in the UK on 11 July 2006 at the Shepherd's Bush Empire in London. "Voodoo Child" made its debut on the UK Singles Chart at number eighteen on digital downloads alone; the following week with combined CD single sales, it peaked at number three. The album was released in the UK on 17 July 2006 and peaked at number forty-six, spending only one week in the top seventy-five. "Watching You" was released as the second single in the UK and peaked in the top forty. "Way to Go!" was released in the UK as the album's third single exclusively as a digital download and failed to chart. "In Love Again" was released exclusively to radio as a promotional single in 2006 in Australia, and peaked at number twenty on the Australian Digital Track Chart.

== Tour ==
In 2006, Rogue Traders embarked on a national tour titled We're Coming Home, playing at various cities around Australia. They performed songs from the album, kicking off each show with "Believer" and ending with an encore of "Voodoo Child". It also previewed songs, including "Better in the Dark", "What You're On" and "Shout Out"(A) from their third album, Better in the Dark (2007).

2006 national tour dates

- 17 September – Brisbane Convention Centre
- 20 September – Newcastle Entertainment Centre
- 22 September – Wollongong Entertainment Centre
- 23 September – Hordern Pavilion, Sydney
- 24 September – Royal Theatre, Canberra
- 27 September – Derwent Entertainment Centre
- 29 September – Palais, Melbourne
- 30 September – Palais, Melbourne
- 1 October – Geelong Arena
- 3 October – Adelaide Entertainment Centre
- 5 October – Challenge Arena, Perth

(A) "Shout Out" was not included on the third album; it was included as a b-side on the single of "I Never Liked You".

== Track listing ==
Standard edition

1. "Believer" (Jamie Appleby, Steven Davis) – 3:28
2. "Voodoo Child" (Appleby, Davis, Declan MacManus) – 3:57
3. "Way to Go!" (Appleby, David Isaac) – 3:16
4. "World Go 'Round" (Appleby, Melinda Appleby) – 4:28
5. "Rescue Me" (Appleby, Davis) – 4:44
6. "Watching You" (Appleby, Berton Averre, Doug Fieger) – 3:28
7. "Change the Channel" (Appleby, Davis) – 0:31
8. "We're Coming Home" (Appleby, Appleby) – 3:21
9. "Fashion" (Appleby) – 3:25
10. "White Lightning" (Appleby, Davis) – 4:11
11. "In Love Again" (Appleby, Roland Orzabal, Curt Smith) – 5:13
12. "Casting Aside" (Appleby, Davis) – 4:36

Limited edition CD 2

1. "Voodoo Child" (James Ash Lektric remix)
2. "Way to Go!" (TV Rock remix)
3. "Watching You" (Dirty South vocal mix)
4. "We're Coming Home" (James Ash remix)
5. "Voodoo Child" (Fuzzy Hair remix)
6. "Watching You" (James Ash's 'Take Me Down' club mix)

== Charts ==
=== Weekly charts ===
| Chart (2005–2006) | Peak position |
|---|---|
| Australian Albums (ARIA) | 2 |
| Scottish Albums (OCC) | 39 |
| UK Albums (OCC) | 46 |

=== Year-end charts ===
| Chart (2005) | Position |
|---|---|
| Australian Albums (ARIA) | 80 |
| Chart (2006) | Position |
| Australian Albums (ARIA) | 6 |

=== Decade-end charts ===
| Chart (2000–2009) | Position |
|---|---|
| Australian Albums (ARIA) | 62 |

== Certification ==
| Region | Certification | Certified units/sales |
|---|---|---|
| Australia (ARIA) | 4× Platinum | 280,000^{^} |
^{^} Shipments figures based on certification alone.

== Awards and recognition ==
The album and its tracks received seven ARIA Award nominations. Three of the ARIA Awards were at the 2005 awards and four were at the 2006 awards:

- Best Video ("Voodoo Child") – awarded to "O Yeah" by End of Fashion.
- Engineer of the Year ("Voodoo Child") – awarded to Notes from a Ceiling by The Mess Hall.
- Best Dance Release ("Voodoo Child") – awarded to Six Feet Above Yesterday by Infusion.

The nominations for the 2006 ARIA Awards were announced in September 2006, the album was nominated for four awards:

- Best Pop Release – awarded to The Secret Life of... by The Veronicas.
- Breakthrough Artist – Album – awarded to Wolfmother by Wolfmother.
- Best Group – awarded to Wolfmother by Wolfmother.
- Highest Selling Album – awarded to Reach Out: The Motown Record by Human Nature.

It has been rated the 45th best album of all time in Australia.

== Release history ==
| Country | Date | Label | Format | Catalog |
|---|---|---|---|---|
| Australia | 23 October 2005 | Columbia Records | CD | 82876735272 |
| Australia | 6 October 2006 | Columbia Records | 2-CD | 82876868112 |
| New Zealand | 14 November 2005 | Columbia Records | CD (Limited) | |
| United Kingdom | 17 June 2006 | Columbia Records | CD | 82876869722 |
| Germany | 24 November 2006 | Columbia Records | CD | |
