= Fussy (disambiguation) =

Fussy is a commune in the Cher department of France.

Fussy may also refer to:

- "Fussy" (song), 2008 single by End of Fashion
- Mr. Fussy, a Mr. Men character
- Hortensia Fussy (born 1954), Austrian sculptor
