= Need You to Show Me =

Single by Rogue Traders
- Released: 11 April 2002 (Australia)
- Recorded: 2002
- Label: Vicious Grooves
- Songwriter(s): James Ash
- Producer(s): James Ash

Rogue Traders singles chronology
"Need You to Show Me" (2002)	"Give in to Me" (2002)

"Need You to Show Me" is the debut single of Australian band Rogue Traders. It was planned to be the lead single from We Know What You're Up To, but it was deleted from the album. It failed to chart on the official ARIA charts but gave the band some minor success. The single has become increasingly rare.

== Track listing ==
Maxi CD single

1. "Need You to Show Me" (original radio edit) – 4:06
2. "Need You to Show Me" (16th Element Vocal Edit) – 4:10
3. "Need You to Show Me" (Original 12" Adventure) – 6:42
4. "Need You to Show Me" (James Ash 'Steppers' Remix) – 5:53
5. "Need You to Show Me" (16th Element Vocal Mix) – 7:54
6. "Need You to Show Me" (Denny/Rachelle Dub) – 6:01

12" vinyl #1

- "Need You to Show Me" (Original 12" Adventure)
- "Need You to Show Me" (James Ash Steppers Remix)

12" vinyl #2

- "Need You to Show Me" (16th Element Mix)
- "Need You to Show Me" (Denny/Rachelle Dub)
- "Need You to Show Me" (16th Element Dub)

== Music video ==
The music video was not available on the Internet until 2016, but when asked by a fan if such a video existed, James Ash stated "The one for Need You To Show Me was the most exciting clip for me by far as it was my first! (And our singer, Jamaica, had a RED AFRO!) It's just Steve and I larking about pretending to be in SNATCH."

The video was uploaded to YouTube by Vicious Recordings in 2016, under the title of "Show Me".

== Charts ==
Chart (2002)	Peak position
ARIA Top 50 Club Chart	16
