= Danny Spencer =

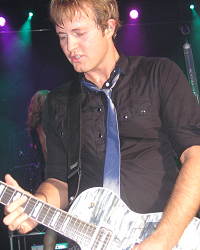
- Danny Spencer performing with the Rogue Traders on the 'Better in the Dark' Tour

Background information
- Birth name: Danny Spencer
- Genres: Alternative rock, electronic rock
- Occupation: Guitarist
- Instrument: Guitar
- Labels: Sony BMG Music Entertainment

Danny Spencer is the former guitarist for Australian band Rogue Traders, taking over from previous guitarist Tim Henwood, who left in order to concentrate on his band the Androids in 2007, with Rogue Traders frontman James Ash stating that "Tim Henwood will be leaving the Rogue Traders in the immediate future to concentrate on his own amazing band, the Androids" on the band's Myspace page. Spencer was first made public through the Rogue Traders forum; Ash said "His name is Danny Spencer, and he's the lucky guy that just beat out a bunch of other super talented players to land the spot of guitarist in the Rogue Traders. Ash also said that Spencer has performed with "some of the biggest names in Australian music including being a regular member of the bands of both Jimmy Barnes and Richard Clapton."
