= Super Love =

Super Love, SuperLove, or Superlove may refer to:

== Film and TV ==
- Superlove (1999 film) fr:Superlove 1999 Grégoire Colin, Isabelle Carré, Catherine Hosmalin
- Superlove (2002 film) List of Estonian animated films

== Music ==
- Superlove Records, Italy, artists including Julie's Haircut

=== Albums ===
- Superlove, album by Ass Ponys 1993
- Superlove Ștefan Bănică, Jr. 2010

=== Songs ===
- "Superlove", a 1969 song by David and the Giants
- "Superlove", a 1981 song by New York Skyy
- "Super Love" (Johnny Gill song), 1983
- "Super Love" (Exile song), 1986
- "Mr. Superlove", a 1993 song by The Afghan Whigs
- "Super Love", a 2002 song by Celine Dion from A New Day Has Come
- "Super Love Song", a 2007 song by B'z
- "Superlove" (Lenny Kravitz song), 2011
- "Superlove", a 2012 song by End of Fashion from Holiday Trip of a Lifetime
- "SuperLove", a 2013 song by Charli XCX
- "Super Love" (Dami Im song), 2014
- "Superlove" (Tinashe song), 2016
- "Superlove", a song by Malurt
- "Super Love", song by Juliana Hansen, sung in the Unikitty! episode, Music Videos.
