= She's Love =

Single by End of Fashion

from the album End of Fashion
- Released: 27 February 2006
- Length: 3:46
- Label: EMI Music
- Songwriter: Justin Burford
- Producers: Dennis Herring, Andy Lawrence, Magoo

End of Fashion singles chronology
"Lock Up Your Daughters" (2005)	"She's Love" (2006)	"The Game" (2006)

"She's Love" is the third single by Australian band End of Fashion, taken from their debut album, End of Fashion. It was released on 27 February 2006 on EMI Music, peaking at No. 38 on the Australian Singles Charts.

The single is a remixed and remastered version of a song from the band's debut EP, Rough Diamonds. "She's Love", together with "Lock Up Your Daughters", featured on the 2006 video game Thrillville.

== Reception ==
Liam McGinniss of FasterLouder states "It’s a good solid rock song. Not too uptempo, nothing too visceral. It’s a nice song, about love, the kind of song you could bring home to meet your parents. Whether that’s what rock and roll is really about is a debate for another time, but the fact is this song has a few nice hooks, some distortion, and a break in the middle before coming back for a sing-along wrapup. Justin Burford is in his usual fine form, crooning his way through this rocked up ballad."

In a review on Absolute Punk, Rich Duncan states "although there are some decent guitar parts in this song, it seems over repetitious and sounds like hundreds of similar bands already rehashing an older rock sound."

== Track listing ==
All tracks are written by Justin Burford, unless otherwise indicated

No.	Title	Length
1.	"She's Love"	3:46
2.	"Anything Goes (Alan Moulder Remix)"	3:14
3.	"Lock Up Your Daughters (Live Acoustic)"	9:47

== Charts ==
Chart (2006)	Peak position
Australian ARIA Singles Chart	38
