= Hello Cleveland =

Hello Cleveland may refer to:

- Hello, Cleveland! Live From The Metro, a live album by the band Cracker
- Hello Cleveland!, an independent record label in Australia
- Hello Cleveland, a band from West Chester, Pennsylvania.
