= I Never Liked You =

I Never Liked You may be referred to:

- I Never Liked You (album) 2022 album by American rapper Future
- I Never Liked You (comics), 1991-1993 graphic novel by Canadian cartoonist Chester Brown
- I Never Liked You (song), 2008 song by Australian band Rogue Traders
