= Love Is a War =

Single by Rogue Traders

from the album Night of the Living Drums
- Released: 25 December 2009
- Recorded: 2009
- Genre: Electronic rock, dance-pop
- Length: 3:29
- Label: Columbia
- Songwriter(s): Jamie Appleby, Melinda Appleby, Melinda Jackson, Elliot Gleave
- Producer(s): James Ash

Rogue Traders singles chronology
| "What You're On" (2008) | "Love Is a War" (2009) | "Would You Raise Your Hands?" (2010) |

Music video
- "Love Is a War" on YouTube

"Love Is a War" is a song written by Jamie Appleby, Melinda Appleby, Melinda Jackson and Elliot Gleave, and produced by Ash for the Rogue Traders's upcoming fourth studio album. It was as released as the album's first single in Australia as a digital download on 25 December 2009 and as a CD single on 8 January 2010. This is the first single with new lead singer Mindi Jackson. The track features English singer/rapper Example.

== Formats and track listings ==
Mindi Jackson in the music video.

Formats and track listings of the major single releases of "Love Is a War" include:

Australian digital download

(Released 25 December 2009)

1. "Love Is a War" – 3:26
2. "Love Is a War" (James Ash 'Bitch Dragon' Remix) – 5:56
3. "Love Is a War" (Denzal Park Dub) – 6:25
4. "I'll Be Your Stalker" – 4:17

Australian CD single / UK Digital download

(88697616112; Released 8 January 2010)

1. "Love Is a War" – 3:29
2. "Love Is a War" (James Ash 'Bitch Dragon' Remix) – 5:58
3. "Love Is a War" (Denzal Park Dub) – 6:26

== Charts ==
Chart performance for "Love Is a War"
| Chart (2010) | Peak position |
|---|---|
| Australia (ARIA) | 90 |

== Release history ==
| Country | Date | Label | Format | Catalog |
|---|---|---|---|---|
| Australia | 20 November 2009 | Columbia Records | Radio airplay | |
| Australia | 25 December 2009 | Columbia Records | Digital download | |
| United Kingdom | 3 January 2010 | Columbia Records | Digital download | |
| Australia | 8 January 2010 | Columbia Records | CD single | 88697616112 |
