= The Game (End of Fashion song) =

Single by End of Fashion

from the album End of Fashion
- Released: 5 June 2006
- Recorded: 2005
- Length: 2:45
- Label: EMI
- Songwriter: Dennis Herring
- Producers: Andy Lawrence, Magoo

End of Fashion singles chronology
"She's Love" (2006)	"The Game" (2006)	"Fussy" (2008)

"The Game" is the fourth single by Australian band End of Fashion, taken from their debut album, End of Fashion. It was released on 5 June 2006 on EMI Music peaking at No. 13 on the Australian Singles Charts, the band's highest charting single to date.

== Reception ==
Nick Craig is of FasterLouder states "Lyrically, "The Game" is about relationships, and ill-fated ones at that." "Musically, End of Fashion sound strong on this track, exhibiting all the elements that have made them a competent band. Burford snarls in his delivery, and the guitars and bass lock in to a fast driving rhythm. There’s some interesting synth beats introduced towards the end, but they are quickly cut short by a thunderous vocal roar. Rapid fire drumming closes the song, plus zappy computer sound effects to reinforce the ‘game’ theme, which also highlight a slick production element that you won’t find in the live show."

Hybrid Music's Rachel Fredrickson considers that "There's even a tad amount of The Killers heard in "The Game"."

== Track listing ==
All tracks are written by Justin Burford, unless otherwise indicated

No.	Title	Length
1.	"The Game"	2:45
2.	"The Game (lounge version)"	4:35
3.	"Denial (live acoustic)"	5:35

== Charts ==
Chart (2006)	Peak position
Australian ARIA Singles Chart	13
