= Book of Lies (album) =

Studio album by End of Fashion
- Released: 27 September 2008
- Genre: Power pop, pop rock
- Label: EMI
- Producer: Magoo, Andy Lawson

End of Fashion chronology
End of Fashion (2005)	Book of Lies (2008)	Holiday Trip of a Lifetime (2012)

Singles from Book of Lies
- 1. "Fussy" Released: 30 August 2008; 2. "Dying for You" Released: 2008; 3. "Down or Down" Released: 2 March 2009

Professional ratings
Review scores
Source	Rating
The Cairns Post	3/5 stars

Book of Lies is the second studio album by Australian pop rock band End of Fashion. It was released on 27 September 2008 on EMI Music Australia. It was recorded in Perth, Western Australia, co-produced by Magoo (Midnight Oil, Powderfinger, Regurgitator) and Andy Lawson (Little Birdy), mixed by Tim Palmer (U2, The Cure, Robert Plant) in Los Angeles and mastered by Stephen Marcussen (R.E.M., Rolling Stones, Stevie Nicks, Tom Petty).

== Background ==
Bass player Tom King explained that Magoo provided the inspiration for the album's title: "It started off with Magoo keeping a journal in the studio, which we dubbed 'the book of lies'. "

In an interview with X-Press Magazine, lead singer Justin Burford explained:

The biggest point of difference between the first record and this one is the time we took preparing. The preparation time for the first album was like, a couple of years on the road. So we were basically like a garage pop band who went into a studio. Dennis didn't really give us the chance to develop or grow beyond that. It was like what we knew went onto the record. This time it was... like an exam. We studied way harder; just the preparation was far more intense. Once we had a pretty good idea of what everything was going to sound like, we didn't need much time in the studio, because we had spent six months working on the demos.

There's a chemistry with this group of people that for some reason works really well. We enjoy making music together. When we hear songs, we just run into these three-year-old kids running around grabbing instruments going "it could sound like this! It could go like this!". It's awesome fun.

— Rodney Averena

== Singles ==
The video for the band's first single, "Fussy", was directed by Natasha Pincus, who also directed the award-winning video for Paul Kelly's "God Told Me To". The video sees Burford as the demented killer and his bandmates as the cling-wrapped victims.

It's more of a narrative – it's less personal than the other songs on the record. It's a pretty startling video clip... but when you work with people you've got to let them make the judgment and run with it.

— Rodney Aravena

It's pretty creepy; a little bit Wolf Creek.

— Tom King

The single was released at the end of August 2008 and peaked at number 47 on the ARIA singles charts.

The second single, "Dying for You", was co-written by Burford with Julian Hamilton of The Presets.

It's very Julian; it took a little while to make it an End of Fashion song. But the two of us working together allowed us both to explore outside our usual genres. I love co-writing for this very reason.

— Justin Burford

== Track listing ==
All songs written by Justin Burford, except where noted.

1. "Biscit" – 2:41
2. "Kamikaze" – 4:01
3. "Down or Down" – 3:20
4. "American" – 3:05
5. "Force of Habit" – 4:20
6. "Dying for You" (Julian Hamilton, Burford) – 3:32
7. "Fussy" – 4:17
8. "Bullets" – 4:01
9. "Trust" – 3:25
10. "Exotica" – 3:48
11. "Burning in Neon" – 2:54
12. "Walk Away" – 5:35

== Charts ==
Chart (2008)	Peak position
Australian Albums (ARIA)	26
