= Rough Diamonds (EP) =

EP by End of Fashion
- Released: March 2004
- Recorded: 2004
- Genre: Power pop
- Length: 16:10
- Label: Hello Cleveland!
- Producer: End of Fashion

End of Fashion chronology
Rough Diamonds (2004)	Too Careful (2004)

Professional ratings
Review scores
Source	Rating
FasterLouder	(favorable)

Rough Diamonds is the debut EP release by Australian power pop band End of Fashion. The songs "Rough Diamonds" and "She's Love" were later re-recorded for their 2005 self-titled debut album.

In Australia, "Rough Diamonds" was ranked 81 on Triple J's Hottest 100 of 2004.

== Track listing ==
No.	Title	Length
1.	"Rough Diamonds"
2.	"Anything Goes"
3.	"Be Like That"
4.	"She's Love"

== Charts ==
Chart (2004)	Peak position
Australia (ARIA)	57
