= We're Coming Home =

2006 single by Rogue Traders

Single by Rogue Traders

from the album Here Come the Drums
- Released: 12 June 2006
- Length: 3:21
- Label: Columbia, Sony BMG Music Entertainment
- Songwriters: James Appleby, Melinda Appleby
- Producer: James Ash

Rogue Traders singles chronology
"Watching You" (2006)	"We're Coming Home" (2006)	"In Love Again" (2006)

"We're Coming Home" is a song by Australian electronic rock band Rogue Traders, released in June 2006 as the fourth and final commercial single from their second studio album, Here Come the Drums (2005). Unlike previous singles from the album, "We're Coming Home" was released exclusively in Australia and did not see an international release.

== Chart performance ==
"We're Coming Home" debuted at number 25 on the Australian ARIA Singles Chart on 25 June 2006. During its second week in, the single descended two places down to number 27 but re-ascended during its third week to number 23. On week four, "We're Coming Home" reached its peak at number 14, where it spent a week.

== Track listing ==
Australian CD single

1. "We're Coming Home" – 3:21
2. "We're Coming Home" (James Ash remix) – 6:13
3. "We're Coming Home" (live at Adelaide Skyshow) – 3:37
4. "Voodoo Child" (Tom Neville remix) – 7:04

== Charts ==
=== Weekly charts ===
Chart (2006)	Peak position
Australia (ARIA)	14
Australian Dance (ARIA)	3

=== Year-end charts ===
Chart (2006)	Position
Australian Dance (ARIA)	15
