= Would You Raise Your Hands? =

Single by Rogue Traders

from the album Night of the Living Drums
- Released: 12 March 2010
- Recorded: 2009
- Genre: Dance-pop, pop rock, electropop
- Length: 3:28
- Label: Columbia
- Songwriters: Jamie Appleby, Melinda Appleby
- Producer: James Ash

Rogue Traders singles chronology
"Love Is a War" (2009)	"Would You Raise Your Hands?" (2010)	"Hearts Beat as One" (2010)

Music video
- "Would You Raise Your Hands?" on YouTube

"Would You Raise Your Hands?" is a pop rock song written by Jamie Appleby and Melinda Appleby, and produced by Ash for the Rogue Traders' fourth studio album Night of the Living Drums. It was as released as the album's second single in Australia as a digital download on 12 March 2010 and as a CD single on 9 April 2010. This is the second single with new lead singer Mindi Jackson. The song contains an interpolation of Adam and the Ants' hit "Antmusic".

"Would You Raise Your Hands" was performed live on Australia Day in Canberra, at the 2010 Logies Awards on 2 May 2010, Hey Hey It's Saturday, and on Sunrise on 24 May 2010.

== Formats and track listings ==
Lead singer Mindi Jackson in the music video.

Australian digital download

(Released 12 March 2010)

1. "Would You Raise Your Hands?" — 3:28

Physical Single

1. "Would You Raise Your Hands?" — 3:28
2. "Would You Raise Your Hands?" (Chew Fu Refix) — 6:40
3. "Would You Raise Your Hands?" (Chris Fraser's Unplugged Remix) — 6:53

iTunes EP

(Released 30 April 2010)

1. "Would You Raise Your Hands?" — 3:28
2. "Sign Language" — 3:43
3. "Would You Raise Your Hands?" (Chew Fu Refix) — 6:40
4. "Would You Raise Your Hands?" (Chris Fraser's Unplugged Remix) — 6:53

== Charts ==
After two weeks of promoting the track, it entered the ARIA Chart on 16 May 2010.

Chart performance for "Would You Raise Your Hands?"
Chart (2010)	Peak position
Australia (ARIA)	95
