= End of Fashion (album) =

Studio album by End of Fashion
- Released: 7 August 2005
- Studio: Sweet Tea Recording Studio, Oxford, M.S., U.S.
- Genre: Power pop; garage rock; Britpop
- Length: 41:43
- Label: Capitol
- Producer: Dennis Herring

End of Fashion chronology
Too Careful (2004)	End of Fashion (2005)	Book of Lies (2008)

Singles from End of Fashion
- 1. "O Yeah" Released: 18 July 2005; 2. "Lock Up Your Daughters" Released: 14 November 2005; 3. "She's Love" Released: 27 February 2006; 4. "The Game" Released: 3 June 2006

Professional ratings
Review scores
Source	Rating
AllMusic	3.5/5 stars

End of Fashion is the debut album by Australian band End of Fashion. It was released in Australia on 15 August 2005, reaching number 3 in the Australian ARIA Albums Chart, and was certified gold by the Australian Recording Industry Association in 2006. It features the single "O Yeah", which reached number 21 on the Australian ARIA Singles Chart.

It also features re-recorded versions of previously released songs, "Rough Diamonds" and "She's Love" from the Rough Diamonds EP, and "Too Careful" and "Love Comes In" from the Too Careful EP.

Additional musicians on the album include Hugh Jennings (a former bassist for End of Fashion), Katy Steele of Little Birdy, and producer Dennis Herring.

== Criticism ==
End of Fashion have been criticised for their uncredited copying of the guitar riff from the Pixies song "Where Is My Mind?" for their song "O Yeah". Rockus Online Magazine reviewer Jonathon Miller called the song "disturbingly Pixies-ish" and went on to write:

"End of Fashion are having no problem appealing to the 95% of people that haven't heard (and still remember) the Pixies' "Where Is My Mind?" and have never experienced a truly exciting live show, and if that's what the band is aiming for, then they are a complete success."

== Track listing ==
All tracks are written by Justin Burford, except "Seize the Day", Burford & Rodney Aravena

No.	Title	Length
1.	"She's Love"	3:46
2.	"O Yeah"	3:00
3.	"The Game"	2:45
4.	"Anymore"	4:02
5.	"Too Careful"	3:14
6.	"Love Comes In"	3:35
7.	"In Denial"	5:04
8.	"Oh Strain"	3:08
9.	"Lock Up Your Daughters"	3:35
10.	"Rough Diamonds"	4:15
11.	"Seize the Day"	5:26
Total length:		41:43

American release
No.	Title	Length
12.	"Anything Goes" (Alan Moulder Remix)	3:13
Total length:		45:01

== Personnel ==
All credits adapted from liner notes.

- Recorded and mixed at Sweet Tea Recording Studio, Oxford, M.S., U.S.
- Mastered at Masterdisk
- Published by EMI Music Publishing, except track 11, EMI Music Publishing / Control

End of Fashion

- Justin Burford
- Rodney Aravena
- Nicholas Jonsson
- Tom King

Additional musicians

- Hugh Jennings
- Dennis Herring
- Katy Steele
- Riley Woolworth
- Raina Woolworth
- Cara Stewart
- Alex Henson
- Lauren Butler
- Margaret "Meggie" Brown
- Katherine Salter
- Amanda Miller
- Meagan Mckibben
- Megan Sellers
- Amy Stanfill

Production and technical

- Dennis Herring – producer, mixing
- Jacquire King – recording, mixing
- Clay Jones – recording
- Patrick Addison – 2nd engineer
- Colby Devereaux – 2nd engineer
- Dawn Palladino – 2nd engineer

Artwork

- Debaser – artwork
- Blasius Erlinger – photography
- Tony Mott – band photography
- John Stanton – band photography

== Charts ==
Chart (2005)	Peak position
Australian Albums (ARIA)	3
