= Too Careful =

EP by End of Fashion
- Released: 1 November 2004
- Recorded: 2004; Big Jesus Burger Studios (Surry Hills, Sydney, Australia)
- Genre: Power pop
- Length: 13:27
- Label: Capitol
- Producer: Paul McKercher

End of Fashion chronology
Rough Diamonds (2004)	Too Careful (2004)	End of Fashion (2005)

Too Careful is the second EP by the Australian power pop band End of Fashion. It was released on 1 November 2004 on the Capitol Records label.

The songs "Too Careful" and "Love Comes In" were later re-recorded for End of Fashion's self-titled debut album.

== Reception ==
Andrew Murfett in the Sydney Morning Herald believed that "on their latest release, Too Careful, End of Fashion have crafted two superb rock songs - the title track and "You and Only You"."

== Track listing ==
All tracks are written by Justin Burford, unless otherwise indicated

No.	Title	Length
1.	"Too Careful"	3:25
2.	"You and Only You"	3:42
3.	"Love Comes In"	3:50
4.	"Counting Your Friends"	2:31

== Credits ==
End of Fashion

- Rodney Aravena - guitar, keyboards, backing vocals
- Justin Burford - vocals, guitar, keyboards, percussion
- Mike Hobbs - drums, backing vocals
- Hugh Jennings - bass, backing vocals, keyboards

Additional musicians

- Joel Quartermain - keyboards, percussion, backing vocals
- Andy Lawson - slide guitar, backing vocals

Technical personnel

- Ben Quinn - cover art
- Sean O'Callaghan - engineer (tracks 2–4)
- Steve Smart - mastering
- Paul McKercher - producer (track 1), mixing
- Lee Yeoh - recording assistant, producing assistant (track 1)
- Debaser - producer (tracks 2–4)
- End Of Fashion - producer (tracks 2–4)

Facilities

- Recorded – Big Jesus Burger Studios
- Engineered – Studio Couch
- Produced – Big Jesus Burger Studios
- Mixed – Sing Sing Studios
- Mastered – Studios 301, Sydney

== Charts ==
Chart (2004)	Peak position
Australia (ARIA)	60
