= Way to Go! =

2005 single by Rogue Traders

Single by Rogue Traders

from the album Here Come the Drums
- Released: 10 October 2005
- Length: 3:16
- Label: Columbia; Sony BMG
- Songwriters: Jamie Appleby; David Isaac
- Producer: James Ash

Rogue Traders singles chronology
"Voodoo Child" (2005)	"Way to Go!" (2005)	"Watching You" (2006)

Music videos
- "Way to Go!" on YouTube; "Way to Go!" (UK version) on YouTube

"Way to Go!" is a song by Australian electronic rock band Rogue Traders from their second album, Here Come the Drums (2005). It was released as the album's second single on 10 October 2005. In the UK, the single was due to be released on 28 May 2007, but the release was cancelled.

== Chart performance ==
"Way to Go!" debuted at number 15 on the Australian ARIA Singles Chart on 23 October 2005. During its second week on the chart, the song descended to number 17 but re-ascended to number nine during its third week. During its fifth week, "Way to Go!" ascended to its peak at number seven, becoming the group's third top-10 single, and was certified gold by the Australian Recording Industry Association (ARIA) for shipping over 35,000 copies. "Way to Go!" was released as the group's third UK single on 28 May 2007, but it failed to chart.

== Music video ==
The Australian video clip was filmed in Sydney, Australia and took a day to shoot. The clip is set in a university lecture, which transforms into a rock concert. The actual filming location was a decayed ballroom in a derelict building adjacent to Sydney's Central Railway Station. The clip stars the band's lead singer, Natalie Bassingthwaighte as the teacher, band member James Ash as the headmaster and a number of "students" who make up the audience for the band's performance (these were mainly fans who had responded to media calls for volunteer participants).

=== UK music video ===
A different video was shot for the UK release, which uses the Metro Radio Mix version of the song. The video premiered on The Box (UK music Channel) at 18:00 - 20:00. The first half of the video features the band performing on a street, and the second half features the band performing in front of a bright set of lights on a rooftop. The video was shot on Cockatoo Island near Sydney.

== Track listings ==
Australian CD single

1. "Way to Go!" (original mix)
2. "Way to Go!" (James Ash remix)
3. "Way to Go!" (TV Rock remix)
4. "Voodoo Child" (James Ash Lektric remix)

UK digital download single

1. "Way to Go!" (Metro radio edit)
2. "Way to Go!" (Dada remix edit)

== Charts ==
=== Weekly charts ===
Chart (2005)	Peak position
Australia (ARIA)	7
Australian Club Chart (ARIA)	9
Australian Dance (ARIA)	1

=== Year-end charts ===
Chart (2005)	Position
Australia (ARIA)	76
Australian Dance (ARIA)	7

Chart (2006)	Position
Australian Dance (ARIA)	16

== Certification ==
Region	Certification	Certified units/sales
Australia (ARIA)	Gold	35,000^{^}
^{^} Shipments figures based on certification alone.

== Release history ==
Region	Date	Format(s)	Label(s)	Ref.
Australia	10 October 2005	CD	Columbia; Sony BMG	
