= What You're On =

2008 single by Rogue Traders

Single by Rogue Traders

from the album Better in the Dark
- Released: 15 March 2008
- Recorded: 2007
- Genre: Dance-pop, soul
- Length: 4:56
- Label: Columbia
- Songwriter(s): James Ash, Natalie Bassingthwaighte, Steve Davis
- Producer(s): James Ash

Rogue Traders singles chronology
"I Never Liked You" (2008)	"What You're On" (2008)	"Love Is a War" (2009)

Music video
- "What You're On" on YouTube

"What You're On" is a dance-pop song written by James Ash, Natalie Bassingthwaighte and Steve Davis, and produced by Ash for the Rogue Traders's third studio album Better in the Dark (2007). Co-writer, Ash, states the song deals with addiction. It was as released as the album's third single in Australia as a digital download on 15 March 2008 and as a CD single on 21 April 2008.

Band member and one of the song's writers, Ash, states that the song is very special to the band and "it seems to connect with people quite deeply." He also states that the song is a highlight from the album and it allowed him to be "indulgent" which is how he imagined it. The band's lead singer, Bassingthwaighte, states "this [song] seems to me to be saying 'You have issues but you can get over it', so I prefer to be realistic than stylistic. I think about someone I know when I sing it." This is the last single with Natalie Bassingthwaighte.

== Promotion and chart performance ==
"What You're On" made its debut into the Australian ARIA Singles Chart on 28 April 2008, at a poor position of number thirty. It continued to slide down the charts until it dropped of the ARIA Top 50 at number 48 after only its 7th week. It reached number eighteen on the Physical Singles Chart, and debuted at number nine on the Australian Chart.

On the eve of its debut, and one week after its release, the Rogue Traders performed their new single on popular comedy program, Rove. Prior to this, band members James Ash and Natalie Bassingthwaighte attended many interviews on radio and television to promote the song, and the upcoming "Better in the Dark Tour", as well as presenting an award at the 2008 MTV Australia Awards. James Ash also co-hosted an episode of The Music Jungle on 26 April.

== Music video ==
The music video for the song was filmed from 23 February 2008 to 24 February 2008 and premiered through ninemsn on 13 March 2008, two days before its digital and radio release. Filmed in black and white, the video sees Bassingthwaighte working in a top-end New York City Burlesque Club. Unhappy and determined to leave, she tries to escape but is followed by a controlling owner and security. Then Ash comes to rescue her and they drive off. The other band members do not appear in the music video. The video is said to be one of their most successful clips to date and a crowd favourie performance on the Better In The Dark Tour

== Track listings ==
Digital download (Released 15 March 2008)

1. "What You're On" (single edit) – 3:38

Australian CD single

1. "What You’re On"
2. "What You’re On" (James Ash remix)
3. "What You’re On" (Cedric Gervais vocal remix)
4. "Don't You Wanna Feel" (Deadmau5 remix)

== Charts ==
=== Weekly charts ===
Chart (2008)	Peak position
Australia (ARIA)	30

=== Year-end charts ===
Chart (2008)	Position
Australian Artists (ARIA)	42

== Release history ==
Country	Date	Label	Format	Catalogue	Ref.
Australia	15 March 2008	Columbia	Digital download	88697304122	
Australia	21 April 2008	Columbia	CD single	88697304122	
