= Stay? =

Single by Rogue Traders

from the album We Know What You're Up To
- Released: 2 June 2003 (Australia)
- Recorded: 2002
- Genre: Dance
- Length: 3:51 (radio edit); 5:37 (album version)
- Label: Vicious Grooves
- Songwriter(s): James Ash
- Producer(s): James Ash

Rogue Traders singles chronology
"One of My Kind" (2003)	"Stay?" (2003)	"Voodoo Child" (2005)

Alternative cover
- Limited edition cover

"Stay?" is a song by the Rogue Traders, released in June 2003 as the third single from their debut album We Know What You're Up To. The single was released on two different formats, a limited edition and a standard edition.

== Track listing ==
Promo (slipcase)

1. "Stay?" (radio edit)

2-track edition

1. "Stay?" (radio edit)
2. "Stay?" (Rogue Traders Bungalow Adventure)

Limited edition

1. "Stay?" (radio edit)
2. "Stay?" (Rogue Traders Bungalow Adventure)
3. "Stay?" (16th Element's Klub Breakfast Mix)
4. "One of My Kind" (Phunked Remix)
5. "Stay?" (16th Element's Dub Breakfast Mix)
6. "Stay?" (album version)

12" vinyl

- A1: "Stay?" (Rogue Traders Bungalow Adventure)
- A2: "Stay?" (original album mix)
- B1: "Stay?" (16th Element Klub Breakfast Mix)

== Charts ==
The single peaked at number 60 and spent three weeks in the Top 100 Singles Chart.

Chart performance for "Stay?"
Chart (2003)	Peak position
Australia (ARIA)	60
