= End of Fashion =

Australian pop rock band

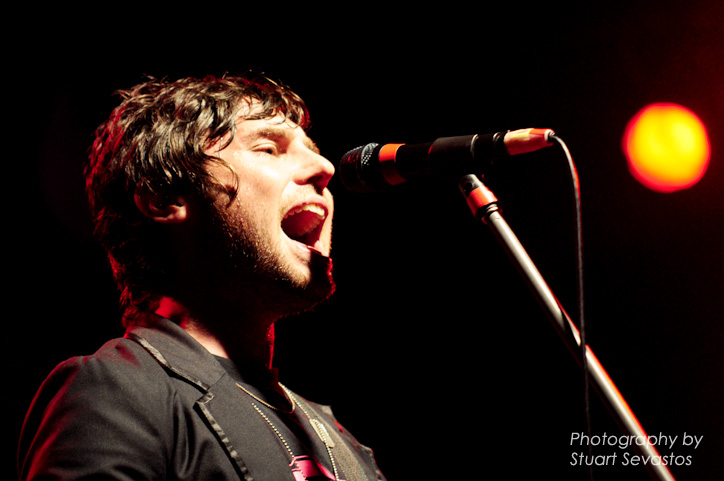
- Justin Burford performing with End of Fashion live in 2009

Background information
- Origin: Perth, Western Australia, Australia
- Genres: Pop rock, power pop, indie rock
- Years active: 2004–2013, 2016, 2018–present
- Labels: Capitol/EMI; Hello Cleveland! Universal
- Spinoff of: The Sleepy Jackson
- Members: Justin Burford; Jade Champion; Jarred Osborne; Salv Di Criscito
- Past members: Vanessa Thornton; Nick Dudman; Jules Dudman; Anthony Jackson; Nathan Sproule; Malcolm Clark; Jonathon Dudman; Mareea Paterson; Hugh Jennings; Nick Jonsson; Tom King; Mike Hobbs; Rodney Aravena; Simon Fasolo; Anthony Jackson

End of Fashion are an Australian pop rock band from Perth, Western Australia. The group gained mainstream attention with its 2005 single "O Yeah", which was voted into eighth position of the Hottest 100 poll, compiled by Australian youth radio station Triple J. The group has released three studio albums. In January 2014, the band took a hiatus before reforming for their first show on 22 September 2018 at the Indian Ocean Hotel in Scarborough.

== History ==
=== 2004: Formation and first EPs ===
The band was formed as a side project by guitarists Justin Burford and Rodney Aravena, together with drummer Malcolm Clark and bassist Jonathon Dudman. After two years, Burford and Aravena split from The Sleepy Jackson to devote their full attention to a band they named "End of Fashion". After a series of bass players and drummers—including Vanessa Thornton from Jebediah, Mike Hobbs, Hugh Jennings from Autopilot, and Nicholas Jonsson—the band settled on the line-up of Hobbs as drummer and Tom King as bass guitarist. The band name also represented the band's aspirations, as Burford explained:

I want to break down the walls – within that context, that image, we can do anything we want no matter whether it's super cheesy or punk, I want to kill fashion, see the end of it.

In 2003, the band started work on its first recording, the four-track EP, Rough Diamonds, with former Midnight Oil guitarist Jim Moginie as producer. The EP was jointly released through independent label Hello Cleveland! (artwork) and major label EMI.

Triple J added both singles, "Anything Goes" and "Rough Diamonds," to high rotation in the first week of the EP's release, and the band then performed sold-out shows during a five-week national tour in support of Little Birdy and Betchadupa. The EP was released in March 2004 and debuted at number 57 on the Australian ARIA Singles Chart and reached number 81 on Triple J's Hottest 100 for 2004. The band signed to EMI/Capitol Australia for overseas licensing options in early 2004, before playing SXSW.

=== 2005–2006: End of Fashion ===
On 25 August 2005, End of Fashion released their self-titled debut album, which was recorded in Oxford, Mississippi, and was produced by Dennis Herring, who had previously worked with Elvis Costello, Counting Crows and Modest Mouse. The album peaked at number 3 on the ARIA Albums Chart and was certified gold in Australia and New Zealand, and was released in the United States in May 2006.

The band's first single, "O Yeah", reached number 21 on the ARIA Singles Chart, number 8 on Triple J's Hottest 100 for 2005, won two ARIA Music Awards and was nominated for the prestigious APRA 'Song of the Year'. The fourth single "The Game" debuted on the ARIA Singles Chart at a career high number 13 in 2006.

Their songs have been on the games Thrillville (which featured "She's Love" and "Lock Up Your Daughters" on the in-game radio), ATV Offroad Fury 4 (which featured "The Game"), and FIFA Street 2 (which featured "O Yeah"). "The Game" was featured as the theme song for the television coverage of the 2007 NRL season on the Nine Network.

=== 2007–2009: Book of Lies ===
On 15 December 2007, End of Fashion released a new song "Biscit" on the band's official website, Facebook and MySpace pages. End of Fashion released a further two new songs, "Kamikaze" and "Walkaway", on their MySpace page on 27 June 2008. The band's second album, titled Book of Lies, was released in September 2008. The first single released from the album was "Fussy", which reached number 47 in the charts.

In an interview with Time Out Sydney in February 2009, Burford revealed that Simon Fasolo had replaced Tom King as the band's bassist. "He's been a really good friend of ours for years and he's been brought into the fold to take Tom's spot who we encouraged to go pursue his own project. "

The second single released from the album was "Dying for You", a collaboration between Burford and Julian Hamilton of The Presets:

They got together at the end of 2007 and did some songwriting and "Dying for You" was the last song they had written. It was cool track so we bounced on it and did our thing. There were a couple of other tunes from their writing session, but "Dying for You" was a cut above the rest.

— Rodney Aravena

The third single "Down or Down" was released digitally in March 2009 and received radio coverage. During their 2009 Australian tour in support of Evermore, Burford announced that "Force of Habit" would be the fourth single taken from Book of Lies.

=== 2010–2016: Holiday Trip of a Lifetime and hiatus ===
End of Fashion's third studio album Holiday Trip of a Lifetime was released on 4 May 2012. The album was independently produced and released, with the band writing the album over the period of one year.

However, the band members parted ways following the album's release, and Burford's focus shifted towards acting and solo music work. In January 2014 Burford identified Triple J as the primary reason for the band's demise, explaining: "'The question becomes, when your entire fan base is tied up in a radio station and that station decides to no longer broadcast your output or even barely acknowledge your existence, where do you go from there?'" Burford's perspective, initially published in a Facebook post, followed criticism of the radio station from other musicians and an article published by the Age newspaper, in which the journalist addressed the issue of whether Triple J has led to the "homogenisation of Australian music". In an interview in 2013, Burford stated that the band hadn't broken up but was in hiatus: "We've never had the chat where we have said 'Let's call it a day'. It's just that everybody has fallen into other rhythms of life."

=== 2016–present: Reunions ===
The band briefly reunited in 2016 before entering a second hiatus period. The shows saw Burford assemble a new line-up of the group: bassist Adam Jackson, drummer Nathan Sproule, and lead guitarist Julian Dudman. The latter was also part of The Sleepy Jackson alongside Burford, and his brother Jonathon was also a former member of End of Fashion. This same line-up made their return with a pair of hometown shows in July 2019. Later that year, the band issued their self-titled LP on vinyl for the first time ever.

Around this time, Burford confirmed that new music was on the way. This was confirmed in August 2020, when the band released a new single entitled "BreakThru", and their newest single "Ruby Lips" a year later in August 2021.

== Side projects ==
Burford joined the cast of the rock musical Rock of Ages in 2010 following a meeting with producers in New York City. Burford played the lead role of Drew Boley. Rock of Ages ran from 8 April to 4 December 2011 and played in Melbourne and Brisbane. Burford was nominated for a Helpmann Award for Best Male Actor in a Musical at the 2012 Helpmann Awards.

Burford also appeared in several episodes of the music-based game show Spicks and Specks, at the time hosted by Adam Hills for the ABC

In early 2012 Burford and former End of Fashion member Mike Hobbs began work crafting a one-man cabaret show that was to focus on the life and music of legendary Nirvana frontman Kurt Cobain. To bring the show to stage, Burford & Hobbs reunited with former bandmates Hugh Jennings and Rodney Aravena and the one time lineup of End of Fashion performed ""KURT"" at the Adelaide Cabaret Festival from 8 to 10 June 2012.

Burford appeared with Perth Symphony Orchestra on 25 September 2013 for Vivaldi by Candlelight at the heritage listed Wesley Church in Western Australia. He later performed with Perth Symphony Orchestra at Symphony by the Lake on 8 March 2014.

In 2014, Aravena formed a blues duo, She Leaves the Mountain, with vocalist Dimity Magnus.

== Discography ==
=== Studio albums ===
| Title | Details | Peak chart positions | Certifications |
| Title | Details | AUS | Certifications |
|---|---|---|---|
| End of Fashion | Released: 15 August 2005; Label: Capitol/EMI; Format: CD | 3 | ARIA: Gold |
| Book of Lies | Released: 27 September 2008; Label: EMI; Format: CD | 26 | |
| Holiday Trip of a Lifetime | Released: 4 May 2012; Label: Universal; Format: CD | — | |

=== Extended plays ===
| Title | Details | Peak chart positions |
| Title | Details | AUS |
|---|---|---|
| Rough Diamonds | Released: March 2004; Label: Hello Cleveland! (TAP005); Format: CD | 57 |
| Too Careful | Released: 1 November 2004; Label: Capitol (8678292); Format: CD | 60 |

=== Singles ===
| Title | Year | Chart peak positions | | Album |
| Title | Year | AUS | NZ | Album |
|---|---|---|---|---|
| "Anything Goes" | 2003 | — (Note: "Anything Goes", "Rough Diamonds" and "Too Careful" were released as radio promo singles only, and ineligible to chart in 2004.) | — | Rough Diamonds |
| "Rough Diamonds" | 2004 | — | — | Rough Diamonds |
| "Too Careful" | 2004 | — | — | Too Careful |
| "O Yeah" | 2005 | 21 | 14 | End of Fashion |
| "Lock Up Your Daughters" | 2005 | 45 | — | End of Fashion |
| "She's Love" | 2006 | 38 | — | End of Fashion |
| "The Game" | 2006 | 13 | — | End of Fashion |
| "Fussy" | 2008 | 47 | — | Book of Lies |
| "Dying for You" | 2008 | — | — | Book of Lies |
| "Down or Down" | 2009 | — | — | Book of Lies |
| "Sleep Away" | 2012 | — | — | Holiday Trip of a Lifetime |
| "Break Thru" | 2020 | — | — | Non-album singles |
| "Wake Up" | 2022 | — | — | Non-album singles |

== Awards and nominations ==
=== APRA Awards ===
The APRA Awards are presented annually from 1982 by the Australasian Performing Right Association (APRA), "honouring composers and songwriters".

| Year | Nominee / work | Award | Result |
|---|---|---|---|
| 2006 | "Oh Yeah" (Justin Burford) | Song of the Year | Nominated |

=== ARIA Music Awards ===
The ARIA Music Awards is an annual awards ceremony that recognises excellence, innovation, and achievement across all genres of Australian music.

| Year | Nominee / work | Award | Result |
|---|---|---|---|
| 2005 | "O Yeah" | Breakthrough Artist – Single | Won |
| 2005 | "Oh Yeah" (director Ben Quinn) | Best Video | Won |

=== MTV Australia Awards ===
The MTV Australia Awards were Australia's first awards show to celebrate both local and international acts. They ran from 2005 to 2009.

| Year | Nominee / work | Award | Result |
|---|---|---|---|
| 2006 | End of Fashion | Spankin' New Aussie Artist | Nominated |

=== West Australian Music Industry Awards ===
The West Australian Music Industry Awards (WAMIs) are annual awards presented to the local contemporary music industry, put on annually by the Western Australian Music Industry Association Inc (WAM).

| Year | Nominee / work | Award | Result (wins only) |
|---|---|---|---|
| 2005 | End of Fashion | Best Rock Act | Won |
| 2006 | "Oh Yeah" | Most Popular Music Video | Won |
| 2017 | Nathan Sproule (End of Fashion) | Best Drummer/Percussionist | Won |
