= Hearts Beat as One =

Single by Rogue Traders
- Released: 24 May 2010
- Recorded: 2010
- Genre: Dance-pop, pop rock, electropop
- Length: 3:40
- Label: Columbia
- Songwriter(s): Jamie Appleby, Melinda Appleby, Melinda Jackson & Tim Henwood
- Producer(s): James Ash

Rogue Traders singles chronology
"Would You Raise Your Hands?" (2010)	"Hearts Beat as One" (2010)	"In Love Again 2021" (2021)

Music video
- "Hearts Beat as One" on YouTube

"Hearts Beat as One" is a pop rock song written by Jamie Appleby, Melinda Appleby, Melinda Jackson & Tim Henwood, and produced by Ash. It was released in Australia as a digital download on 24 May 2010 and as a CD single on 11 June 2010. The song contains heartbeats contributed by people from around Australia. This song was written for the Socceroos as the official National Anthem for this year 2010 FIFA World Cup. It has also been performed on Sunrise.

== Formats and track listings ==
Australian digital download

(Released 24 May 2010)

1. "Hearts Beat as One" (Official Song of the Qantas Socceroos) – 3:40

Australian CD single

(88697745802 Released 11 June 2010)

1. "Hearts Beat as One" – 3:40

== Charts ==
Year	Chart	Peak position
2010	Australian Physical Singles (ARIA Charts)	#15

== Release history ==
Country	Date	Label	Format	Catalog
Australia	24 May 2010	Columbia Records	Radio airplay	
Australia	24 May 2010	Columbia Records	Digital download	
Australia	11 June 2010	Columbia Records	CD single	88697745802
