= Fussy (song) =

Single by End of Fashion

from the album Book of Lies
- Released: 30 August 2008
- Recorded: 2008
- Genre: Pop
- Label: EMI
- Songwriter: Justin Burford
- Producers: Andy Lawrence, Magoo

End of Fashion singles chronology
"The Game" (2006)	"Fussy" (2008)	"Dying for You" (2009)

"Fussy" is the first single by Australian pop rock band End of Fashion, from their second album, Book of Lies. It was released on 30 August 2008 on EMI Music.

It was the band's first release in over two years. Justin Burford describes "Fussy" as "the struggle between the light and dark sides of human personality". The Vine Magazine described it as "sultry backing vocals, Spanish trumpet and rhythmic acoustic guitar, 'Fussy’ is the perfect way to reintroduce End Of Fashion into the musical fray". Dwarf Magazine described it as "starting with much gusto and energy, the drum beat almost like riding a horse with the horns adding a bit of excitement during the journey".

Despite being added to radio station playlists around Australia within weeks of its release the single peaked at #47 on the Australian Singles charts. Burford later attributed this to the fact that national youth broadcaster, Triple J, refused to play the song on-air. "Our lead single, "Fussy" was even openly derided on air by Richard Kingsmill as ‘just another pop release’. Apparently this was before pop was declared no longer a dirty word on the j's. This, I might add was the ONLY time that song was ever played on this station." - Justin Burford

== Track listing ==
No.	Title	Length
1.	"Fussy"	4:47
2.	"Kamikaze"	4:01
3.	"Loud Mouth"	3:35

== Charts ==
Chart (2005)	Peak position
Australian ARIA Albums Chart	47
