= O Yeah (End of Fashion song) =

2005 single by End of Fashion

Single by End of Fashion

from the album End of Fashion
- B-side: "Hardcore"; "Quicksand" (live)
- Released: 18 July 2005
- Length: 3:01
- Label: EMI
- Songwriter: Justin Burford
- Producer: Dennis Herring

End of Fashion singles chronology
"O Yeah" (2005)	"Lock Up Your Daughters" (2005)

"O Yeah" is a song by Australian pop rock band End of Fashion, taken from their self-titled debut album (2005). Released as the band's debut single on 18 July 2005, it peaked at number 21 on the Australian ARIA Singles Chart. It was also a top-20 hit in New Zealand, where it reached number 14 in September 2005.

== Music video ==
The Ben Quinn directed music video won the ARIA Award for Best Video at the ARIA Music Awards of 2005.

== Track listing ==
Australian CD single

No.	Title	Length
1.	"O Yeah" (radio edit)	3:01
2.	"Hardcore"	3:00
3.	"Quicksand" (live)	4:40

== Charts ==
Chart (2005)	Peak position
Australia (ARIA)	21
New Zealand (Recorded Music NZ)	14
