= Holiday Trip of a Lifetime =

Studio album by End of Fashion
- Released: 4 May 2012
- Recorded: 2009–2010
- Genre: Pop rock
- Label: Universal

End of Fashion chronology
Book of Lies (2008)	Holiday Trip of a Lifetime (2012)

Holiday Trip of a Lifetime is the third studio album by Australian pop-rock band End of Fashion. It was released on 4 May 2012 by Universal Music Group.

== Background ==
On the making of the album, frontman Justin Burford has said, "the whole process of writing and recording this album had to be the most fun two years of my life".

During the process of recording the album, End of Fashion drummer Mike Hobbs left the band, as he didn't like the album's "studio pop band" approach. Burford took on the drum parts. Bass guitarist Tom King also left and was replaced by Simon Fasolo.

== Track listing ==
1. "Holiday Trip of a Lifetime" – 3:31
2. "The Magician" – 3:17
3. "Paper Aeroplanes" – 3:16
4. "Legs Grow Long" – 4:34
5. "Never Far Away" – 3:31
6. "I Will Lay Down" – 3:11
7. "Sleepaway" – 4:26
8. "Superlove" – 3:28
9. "A Different Mood" – 3:29
10. "Lift Off" – 3:41

== Critical reception ==
Brisbane's now-defunct Rave magazine gave the album a positive review, writing, "for those raised on meat-and-potatoes Aussie melodic indie guitar rock, this could be considered a betrayal of Young Modern proportions. However, I'm hearing a re-energised band making some of the slinkiest pop of their career". X-Press Magazine wrote, "admittedly, the album gets repetitive, but overall it makes for an enjoyable listen."
