= Need You Tonight =

1987 single by INXS

Single by INXS

from the album Kick
- B-side: "I'm Coming (Home)"; "Mediate" (music video)
- Released: 21 September 1987
- Genre: Funk rock; dance-rock; new wave
- Length: 3:00
- Label: WEA
- Songwriters: Andrew Farriss; Michael Hutchence
- Producer: Chris Thomas

INXS singles chronology
"Good Times" (1987)	"Need You Tonight" (1987)	"New Sensation" (1987)

Music video
- "Need You Tonight" on YouTube

"Need You Tonight" is a song by the Australian rock band INXS, released as the lead single from their sixth studio album, Kick (1987). In additional to reaching number three in Australia, the song became a chart hit worldwide, peaking at number one on the US Billboard Hot 100 chart, giving INXS their only number-one single in the United States. It also entered the top five in Canada, Ireland, New Zealand, South Africa, and the United Kingdom.

In February 2014, after the Channel 7 screening of the INXS: Never Tear Us Apart mini-series, "Need You Tonight" charted again in Australia via download sales. It peaked at No. 28 on the ARIA Singles Chart. In January 2018, as part of Triple M's "Ozzest 100", the 'most Australian' songs of all time, "Need You Tonight" was ranked number 69. In 2025, the song was ranked at number 59 on the Triple J Hottest 100 of Australian Songs.

== Music video ==
The music video for "Need You Tonight" combined live action and different kinds of animation. Directed by Richard Lowenstein, the video was actually "Need You Tonight / Mediate", as it combined two songs from the album. Lowenstein claimed that the particular visual effects in "Need You Tonight" were created by cutting up 35mm film and photocopying the individual frames, before re-layering those images over the original footage.

For "Mediate", it segues into a tribute to Bob Dylan's "Subterranean Homesick Blues". The members flip cue cards with words from the song; the last one displays the words "Sax Solo," at which point Kirk Pengilly starts a saxophone solo. Beneath the lyric "a special date" in the "Mediate" portion of the video, the cue card shown reads "9-8-1945" which in Australian date format is 9 August 1945, the date which the atomic bomb was dropped on Nagasaki, Japan.

The video won five MTV Video Music Awards including 1988 Video of The Year and was ranked at number twenty-one on MTV's countdown of the 100 greatest videos of all time.

== Track listings ==
7-inch single

1. "Need You Tonight" – 3:01
2. "I'm Coming (Home)" – 4:54

7-inch single

1. "Need You Tonight" – 3:01
2. "Need You Tonight" (Mendelsohn extended mix) – 7:02

12-inch single

1. "Need You Tonight" – 3:01
2. "Mediate" – 2:35
3. "I'm Coming (Home)" – 4:53

12-inch single

1. "Need You Tonight" (Mendelsohn extended mix) – 7:02
2. "Move On" – 4:47
3. "Kiss the Dirt (Falling Down the Mountain)" – 3:54

12-inch single

1. "Need You Tonight" (Ben Liebrand mix) – 7:18
2. "Move On" – 4:47
3. "New Sensation" (extended mix) – 6:30

Maxi-CD single

1. "Need You Tonight" – 3:05
2. "Don't Dream It's Over" – 4:00
3. "Need You Tonight" (extended version) – 6:36
4. "Need You Tonight" (remix) – 4:03

UK Re-release CD single

1. "Need You Tonight" (Mendelsohn Mix) – 5:11
2. "Move On" (4:47)
3. "Original Sin" (5:16)
4. "Don't Change" (4:24)

== Personnel ==
Personnel are sourced from Mix.

- Michael Hutchence – lead and backing vocals
- Andrew Farriss – electric guitar, E-mu Emulator II, synthesizer, Roland TR-707 programming
- Tim Farriss – electric guitar
- Kirk Pengilly – electric guitar, saxophone
- Garry Gary Beers – bass guitar
- Jon Farriss – drums

== Charts ==
=== Weekly charts ===
Chart (1987–1988)	Peak position
Australia (Australian Music Report)	3
Austria (Ö3 Austria Top 40)	16
Belgium (Ultratop 50 Flanders)	9
Canada Top Singles (RPM)	2
Europe (Eurochart Hot 100)	9
France (SNEP)	10
Ireland (IRMA)	2
Italy Airplay (Music & Media)	1
Netherlands (Dutch Top 40)	11
Netherlands (Single Top 100)	12
New Zealand (Recorded Music NZ)	3
South Africa (Springbok Radio)	5
UK Singles (Official Charts)	2
US Billboard Hot 100	1
US Dance Club Songs (Billboard)	7
US Dance Singles Sales (Billboard)	10
US Hot R&B/Hip-Hop Songs (Billboard)	73
US Mainstream Rock Airplay (Billboard)	12
US Cash Box Top 100	1
West Germany (GfK)	16

Chart (2006)	Peak position
US Dance Club Songs (Billboard) Static Revenger/Koishii & Hush mixes	16

Chart (2014)	Peak position
Australia (ARIA)	28

=== Year-end charts ===
Chart (1987)	Position
Australia (Australian Music Report)	26
New Zealand (RIANZ)	43

Chart (1988)	Position
Belgium (Ultratop 50 Flanders)	67
Canada Top Singles (RPM)	19
Europe (Eurochart Hot 100 Singles)	51
UK Singles (OCC)	51
US Billboard Hot 100	2
US Cash Box Top 100	16
West Germany (Media Control)	66

Chart (1989)	Position
Europe (Eurochart Hot 100 Singles)	63

== Certifications ==
Region	Certification	Certified units/sales
Australia (ARIA)	Gold	35,000^{^}
Denmark (IFPI Danmark)	Gold	45,000^{‡}
Italy (FIMI)	Gold	50,000^{‡}
New Zealand (RMNZ)	3× Platinum	90,000^{‡}
Spain (Promusicae)	Gold	30,000^{‡}
United Kingdom (BPI)	Platinum	600,000^{‡}
^{^} Shipments figures based on certification alone.^{‡} Sales+streaming figures based on certification alone.

== Release history ==
Region	Date	Format(s)	Label(s)	Ref.
Australia	21 September 1987	7-inch vinyl	WEA	
Japan	25 February 1988	Mini-CD	WEA	
United Kingdom (re-release)	31 October 1988	7-inch vinyl; 12-inch vinyl	Mercury; Phonogram	
United Kingdom (re-release)	14 November 1988	CD	Mercury; Phonogram	

== Rogue Traders remix ==
"One of My Kind"

Single by Rogue Traders vs. INXS

from the album We Know What You're Up To
- Released: 24 February 2003
- Length: 3:20 (radio edit); 4:18 (album version)
- Label: Vicious Grooves
- Songwriter: James Ash
- Producer: James Ash

Rogue Traders singles chronology
"Give in to Me" (2002)	"One of My Kind" (2003)	"Stay?" (2003)

Rogue Traders covered and remixed "Need You Tonight" and released it as a single in Australia. The song was renamed "One of My Kind", where it reached No. 10 on the Australian Top 100 Singles Chart, becoming their first top-10 hit. "One of My Kind" is the second single released by the Rogue Traders for their debut album We Know What You're Up To.

The music video is set in a dance party where the lizard on the single cover wanders around looking for a girl of his kind. He finds one looking lonely. The two sit together and he sings the line 'you're one of my kind' before the video ends.

The Sam Bennetts and Rising Sun Pictures directed music video was nominated for Best Video at the ARIA Music Awards of 2003.

=== Track listings ===
Maxi-CD single

1. "One of My Kind" (radio edit)
2. "One of My Kind" (club mix edit)
3. "One of My Kind" (Phunked remix)

12-inch vinyl

1. "One of My Kind" (12-inch mix)
2. "One of My Kind" (radio edit)
3. "One of My Kind" (dub mix)

Australian CD single

1. "One of My Kind" (radio edit)
2. "One of My Kind" (Rogue Traders Club Adventure)
3. "One of My Kind" (Swimming in Blue mix)
4. "One of My Kind" (Rogue Traders dub)
5. "Make It Better" (original mix)

=== Charts ===
The single spent 15 weeks on the ARIA Charts, nine of which were in the top 50. The single also topped the ARIA Club and Dance charts.

==== Weekly charts ====
Chart (2003)	Peak position
Australia (ARIA)	10
Australian Club Chart (ARIA)	1
Australian Dance (ARIA)	1

==== Year-end charts ====
Chart (2003)	Position
Australian Dance (ARIA)	15

== Other cover versions ==
- Australian singer Kylie Minogue performed the song as part of the setlist of her Kiss Me Once Tour. Minogue, a one-time romantic partner of the late INXS frontman Michael Hutchence, considered her performances of the song to be a tribute to him.
- In March 2010, UK rapper Professor Green released a song based entirely on the song called "I Need You Tonight".
- In June 2016, American singer Bonnie Raitt recorded a live version at Orpheum Theatre (Boston)
- English singer and songwriter Dua Lipa's 2020 single "Break My Heart" interpolates the song's guitar riff.

== See also ==
- List of Billboard Hot 100 number-one singles of 1988
- List of Cash Box Top 100 number-one singles of 1988
