= Give In to Me (Rogue Traders song) =

"Give in to Me"

Single by Rogue Traders

from the album We Know What You're Up to
- Released: 14 October 2002 (Australia)
- Recorded: 2002
- Label: Vicious Grooves
- Songwriter(s): James Ash
- Producer(s): James Ash

Rogue Traders singles chronology
"'Need You to Show Me'" (2002)	"Give in to Me" (2002)	"'One of My Kind'" (2003)

"Give in to Me" is a song by the Rogue Traders, released in October 2002 as the lead single from their debut album We Know What You're Up To. The single peaked at number 67 in its six-week run in the Australian Top 100 Singles Chart.

== Music video ==
The music video wasn't available on the Internet before 2016, however when asked by a fan if such a video existed, James Ash stated, "The one for Give In To Me was filmed at OneLove, Melbourne. Lots of great friends and memories in that clip - and the Mrs on lead vox!!!!".

The video was uploaded to YouTube by Vicious Recordings in 2016. The video is themed around a group of girls going to see the Rogue Traders, in the style of an early-2000s reality program.

== Track listing ==
Maxi CD Single

1. "Give in to Me" (Radio Edit)
2. "Give in to Me" (Andy Van Club Remix)
3. "Give in to Me" (Original 12")
4. "Give in to Me" (Andy Van Dub Remix)

== Charts ==
Chart performance for "Give In to Me"
Chart (2002)	Peak position
Australia (ARIA)	67
