= I Never Liked You (song) =

2008 single by Rogue Traders

Single by Rogue Traders

from the album Better in the Dark
- B-side: "Shout Out"
- Released: 14 January 2008
- Genre: Pop rock, dance-pop
- Length: 3:29
- Label: Columbia
- Songwriters: James Ash, Melinda Appleby, Natalie Bassingthwaighte, Timothy Henwood
- Producer: James Ash

Rogue Traders singles chronology
"Don't You Wanna Feel" (2007)	"I Never Liked You" (2008)	"What You're On" (2008)

Music video
- "I Never Liked You" on YouTube

"I Never Liked You" is a dance-pop song performed by Australian band Rogue Traders. The song was written by James Ash, Melinda Appleby, Natalie Bassingthwaighte and Timothy Henwood, and produced by Ash for the band's third studio album Better in the Dark (2007). The song's lyrics were written as a reaction "to endless love songs on [the] radio".

The song was released as the album's second single in Australia on 14 January 2008. It has reached number nine on the Australian singles chart, and has become the band's sixth top ten single.

== Background and release ==
According to lead singer Natalie Bassingthwaighte, "I Never Liked You" began as a song about Cinderella, but "that didn't go anywhere!". James Ash has described the song as a "reaction to endless love songs on [the] radio" and said that he "wanted to [do] something opposite. I like to think of it as the Anti-Breakup song!"

"I Never Liked You" was released as a CD single and digital download in Australia. The CD single included "Shout Out", a previously unreleased song, and both formats featured a remix of "Watching You" by Chris Lake. In November 2007, the band performed the song during the Australian Idol 2007 grand finale at the Sydney Opera House. James Ash has described the performance as their "best TV moment".

== Chart performance ==
"I Never Liked You" debuted on the Australian Singles Chart on 27 January 2008 at number eleven. The following week, the song rose two positions to number nine. During its third week fell out of the ARIA top 10 to number 11. It stayed within the top 50 for a further 12 weeks.

On the Physical Singles Chart, "I Never Liked You" debuted and peaked at number five, and on the Digital Track Chart, it peaked at number ten.

On 19 April, I Never Liked You was certified Gold (35,000+ copies sold) by ARIA Charts

== Music video ==
The music video for "I Never Liked You" was filmed in late 2007. The video was influenced by kung fu and manga and features Bassingthwaighte and Ash combating an Asian gang to rescue their band members, who have been taken hostage. The video begins with the band performing in a garage. Scenes of Bassingthwaighte and Ash being chased on motorcycles in a futuristic city are then shown. The video concludes with Bassingthwaighte and Ash fighting the gang and escaping with the other band members.

Bassingthwaighte and Ash received stunt training over two days by the team behind stunts in the Star Wars and The Matrix. The music video premiered on the band's official website on 14 December 2007.

== Track listings ==
CD single
(88697212382; Released 14 January 2008)

1. "I Never Liked You" – 3:29
2. "Shout Out" – 3:59
3. "Watching You" (Chris Lake's downtown vocal) – 6:51

Digital download
(Released 10 November 2007)

1. "I Never Liked You" – 3:28

iTunes EP
(Released 15 January 2008)

1. "I Never Liked You" – 3:31
2. "Watching You" (Chris Lake's downtown vocal) – 6:53

== Charts ==
=== Weekly charts ===
Chart (2008)	Peak position
Australia (ARIA)	9

=== Year-end charts ===
Chart (2008)	Position
Australia (ARIA)	71

== Certifications ==
Region	Certification	Certified units/sales
Australia (ARIA)	Gold	35,000^{^}
^{^} Shipments figures based on certification alone.
