= We Know What You're Up To =

Studio album by Rogue Traders
- Released: May 5, 2003 (Australia)
- Recorded: 2002–2003
- Genre: Alternative dance, dance-rock
- Length: 53:30
- Label: Vicious Grooves, Virgin
- Producer: James Ash, Steve Davis

Rogue Traders chronology
We Know What You're Up To (2003)	Here Come the Drums (2005)

Singles from We Know What You're Up To
- 1. "Give in to Me" Released: 14 October 2002; 2. "One of My Kind" Released: 24 February 2003; 3. "Stay?" Released: 2 June 2003

Professional ratings
Review scores
Source	Rating
In the Mix	link
Smash Hits	3/5 stars

We Know What You're Up To is the debut studio album by Australian band Rogue Traders. It was released by Vicious Grooves, Virgin in Australia on 5 May 2003 (see 2003 in music). After disappointing sales and poor publicity, Rogue Traders was dropped from the label. "One of My Kind" became a Top 10 hit in Australia, the band's first hit anywhere in the world.

== Track listing ==
1. "To Be Someone"
2. "One of My Kind" (Rogue Traders vs. INXS)
3. "Overload"
4. "Make It Better"
5. "Stay?"
6. "Broken"
7. "Revolution"
8. "Golden"
9. "Give in to Me"
10. "Take It Deeper"
11. "Lift this Planet"
- "Need You to Show Me" was to be included on all editions of the album, but was later deleted from the album because the band didn't feel it matched the 'vibe' of the rest of the album. The song was replaced with "One of My Kind".
