= Rogue Traders =

Australian electronic rock band

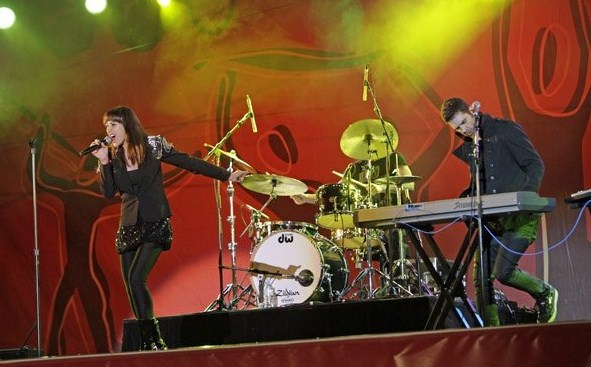
- Rogue Traders performing live at FIFA Fan Fest, Sydney, June 2010. Mindi Jackson at left, James Ash at right, Peter Marin obscured behind drum kit.

Background information
- Origin: Melbourne, Victoria, Australia
- Genres: Electronic rock; pop rock; new wave; dance-pop; electropop
- Years active: 2001–2011, 2015–present
- Labels: Vicious Vinyl/Vicious Grooves; Festival Mushroom; Sony BMG; Sony
- Members: James Ash; Tim Henwood; Cameron McGlinchey; Natalie Bassingthwaighte
- Past members: Steve Davis; Mindi Jackson; Peter Marin; Danny Spencer
- Website: roguetraders.net

Rogue Traders is an Australian electronic rock band formed in Melbourne, Victoria in 2002 by mainstay James Ash on keyboards. In 1989, Ash met fellow original member Steve Davis in London while both were working as DJs. Before forming Rogue Traders, the pair had worked together on many projects, including the dance music act Union State, which relocated to Melbourne in 1992. The group's name comes from the 1999 drama film, Rogue Trader. They were joined in 2004 by soap opera actress, Natalie Bassingthwaighte, on lead vocals, Cameron McGlinchey on drums and Tim Henwood on guitar. Davis continued as a behind-the-scenes member, contributing to the songwriting process but not making any public appearances with the group.

Rogue Traders have achieved chart success in Australia, with seven top 20 hits on the ARIA Singles Chart, "One of My Kind", "Voodoo Child", "Way to Go!", "Watching You", "We're Coming Home", "Don't You Wanna Feel" and "I Never Liked You". Their most successful single, "Voodoo Child", peaked at number three on the UK Singles Chart, number four in Australia, number seven on the New Zealand Singles Chart and number fifteen on the Irish Singles Chart. The group's two Top 5 albums in Australia are Here Come the Drums (2005) and Better in the Dark (2007). In 2007, Here Comes the Drums was certified 4× platinum by ARIA for shipment of 280,000 copies, while Better in the Dark was certified platinum in 2008. As of 2008, Rogue Traders have been nominated for ten ARIA Awards, three MTV AVMA Awards, one The Nickelodeon Kids' Choice Awards, one Inside Film Award, and eight APRA Awards.

In June 2008, Bassingthwaighte left the band to focus on her acting and solo music career. In July that year, her then-boyfriend and later husband, McGlinchey, also left the band.

In November 2008, Mindi Jackson joined as vocalist to replace Bassingthwaighte and Peter Marin joined on drums to replace McGlinchey. The band was dumped by Sony Records in 2010, and split due to infighting shortly afterwards. Their fourth studio album and greatest hits compilation, The Sound of Drums, was released after their split in November 2011.

In December 2015, the group reformed with Bassingthwaighte. The band was working on new music, expected to be released in late 2017, which had not yet materialised as of 2021, though a 2021 remix EP of "In Love Again" was released in June 2021.

== History ==
=== Formation ===
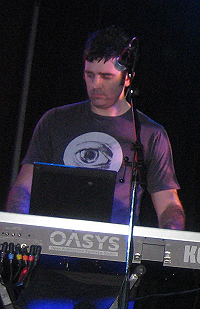
James Ash performing with Rogue Traders, May 2008.

Rogue Traders formed as an Australian electronic, pop rock band in Melbourne in 2002 by former members of Union State, James Ash (aka Jamie Appleby) on keyboards and Steve Davis on guitar. The duo had met in 1989 in London where both were working as DJs. The pair first worked on a rap track, Ash recalled "It was a terrible song but Steve and I hit it off straight away and became fast friends". Ash relocated to Melbourne in 1992, but the pair continued to work together and formed Union State to release singles including, "Out to Get You" and "Retrosexual". In 1994 Ash signed with Vicious Vinyl as a solo artist under the name, Thunderchild, to issue a self-named single. By 2002 the duo had formed Rogue Traders and signed with Vicious Vinyl's house music label, Vicious Grooves.

=== 2002–2004: We Know What You're Up To ===
On 11 April 2002, Rogue Traders released their debut single, "Need You to Show Me", under the Vicious Grooves label, which failed to reach the top 100 on the ARIA Singles Chart. However, it did reach No. 16 on the Top 50 Club Chart. It was originally intended to be the lead single for their debut album, We Know What You're Up To, however it was cut from the album's track listing before its release. The single was recorded with Jamaica Williams providing lead vocals. Half a year later, their second single, "Give in to Me", was released on 14 October. The track had lead vocals by Melinda Richards, and was written by Ash, Davis, Josephine Armstead and Milton Middlebrook. It performed better than their first release on the ARIA Singles Chart, peaking at No. 67. At the APRA Music Awards of 2003 it was nominated for 'Most Performed Dance Work'. Ash and Richards later married and, as Melinda Appleby, she contributed songwriting credits to Rogue Traders later work.

The band's first top 20 success came in 2003 when "One of My Kind", a remix/cover version of INXS's "Need You Tonight", was released on 23 February, which peaked at No. 10, and spent nine weeks inside the top 50. The single brought greater recognition for the band and, at ARIA Music Awards of 2003, they were nominated in two categories, "Breakthrough Artist – Single" and "Best Video" (by Sam Bennetts, Rising Sun Pictures), and won "Best Dance Release". On 5 May 2003, their debut album, We Know What You're Up To, was released, but it failed to reach the top 100 on the related Albums Chart. The third and final single from the album, "Stay?", was released on 2 June, which peaked at No. 60.

Natalie Bassingthwaighte gained popular acclaim as an actress on the Australian soap opera, Neighbours, playing the role of Izzy Hoyland from 2003. By 2004, she began working on a parallel music career creating her own demos: songs with an acoustic-rock sound when, late that year, she was recruited as the lead singer for Rogue Traders. Upon being presented with the band's music, Bassingthwaighte auditioned for Ash and Davis. The pair had auditioned 15 to 20 candidates, and after she performed their song "Voodoo Child", she became the band's front woman.

=== 2005–2006: Here Come The Drums ===
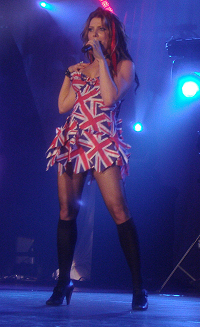
Natalie Bassingthwaighte performing in Sydney for the We're Coming Home Tour in 2006.

Rogue Traders first single with Bassingthwaighte's vocals, "Voodoo Child", was issued in May 2005. Its Australian release occurred without any mention of Bassingthwaighte in its promotion, as they wanted people to buy it because they liked the song instead of for its 'celebrity value'. The single reached number four in Australia, number seven in New Zealand, number three in the United Kingdom (in July 2006), and number fifteen in Ireland (also July 2006).

In October 2005, the group performed at the NRL Grand Final shortly before the release of their second album, Here Come the Drums on 23 October. By that time they had added Cameron McGlinchey on drums. The album peaked at number two on the ARIA Albums Chart and reached the top 50 on the UK Albums Chart. The group had signed a new record contract with Sony BMG and now promoted their recent band members Bassingthwaighte and McGlinchey. The second single from the album, "Way to Go!" reached number seven in Australia, while "Watching You" peaked at number five. Like many other modern mainstream music acts, Rogue Traders use elements of old songs in their music. However, rather than sampling the original songs, they re-record the relevant parts. "Voodoo Child" contains a re-recorded riff from "Pump It Up" by Elvis Costello (co-credited as Declan MacManus), "Watching You" contains re-recorded elements of "My Sharona" by The Knack (co-credited to Doug Fieger and Berton Averre) and "In Love Again" contains re-recorded elements of "Head over Heels" by Tears for Fears (co-credited to Roland Orzabal and Curt Smith).

Early in 2006, the Rogue Traders toured Australia in support of their second album and its singles. Bassingthwaighte left Neighbours to focus on her music career and filmed her final scenes on 2 June. In March 2007, she reprised her role as Izzy Hoyland in scenes shot while on location in London in November 2006.

Rogue Traders won the 2006 MTV Australian Video Music Award for Best Dance Video for "Voodoo Child". In June at the APRA Music Awards of 2006, Rogue Traders won their first APRA Award, with "Way to Go!" taking out the "Most Performed Dance Work" category. They had twice previously been nominated in the same category, in 2003 for their single "Give in to Me" and in 2004 for "One of My Kind", which also won an ARIA award. Also in June 2006, Rogue Traders announced they were re-releasing Here Come the Drums, as a limited edition two-CD remix set. The second CD contained remixes of their hit singles and the album included new artwork. It was released on the same day as their fourth single, "We're Coming Home" from the album. The single reached number fourteen. That same month, Bassingthwaighte and Ash announced on Video Hits that the band were currently in the process of writing their third studio recorded album. By that time Davis had left the group but continued to contribute as part of the songwriting process. He was replaced on guitar by Tim Henwood, previously of The Androids.

Rogue Traders announced in early 2006 that they had signed with the European division of Sony BMG and were to be releasing their second album Here Come the Drums and singles from the album into that market. On 10 July "Voodoo Child" became their first UK single and the album followed on 24 July. A gig was announced in the UK at Shepherd's Bush Empire in London for 11 July—to promoted "Voodoo Child" and Here Come the Drums. Many radio stations across the UK had started to play "Voodoo Child" six weeks before its release. The "Voodoo Child" video clip began to receive airplay on programs across UK: The Box, The Hits and MTV Dance. The clip was the same as the Australian version. It reached top 5 positions on programs and number-one on some radio stations as well. The song received numerous positive reviews from radio stations, TV programs and music critics. Some called it a 'summer anthem for 2006' and some named it either 'Record of the Week/Month'. The video and single was then put onto iTunes UK for purchase. The video reached number two on the iTunes Video Chart and stayed in the top five for several days, while the single made its way into the top ten and days later into the top five.

"Voodoo Child" was physically released on 10 July in the UK but debuted in the chart the week before at number eighteen due to download sales. After its official release, "Voodoo Child" reached number three with sales of over 21,000. Due to its UK chart success, "Voodoo Child" was issued in several European countries including Netherlands, Belgium and Luxembourg. On 16 October "Watching You" was released in the UK as the band's second single and peaked at number thirty-three on the singles chart. A new video clip was filmed, along with a new remix track, and the third UK single from Here Come the Drums was "Way to Go!" – it was issued as a digital download. In November they released "In Love Again" as a promotional single exclusively though radio, which peaked at number twenty on the ARIA Digital Tracks.

In June 2007, "Voodoo Child" was featured in the Doctor Who episode, "The Sound of Drums" (Season 3, Episode 12). The song was preceded by the episode's villain, The Master, proclaiming "Here come the drums!" The song's lyrics echo the title of the episode, which refers to the drumming the Master hears in his head. Rogue Traders were also a surprise inclusion to the 2006 season of Big Brother Australia, entering the house and playing a "concert" for house mates. The event was also streamed to Big Brother audiences from the program's website. The Rogue Traders' song, "Fashion" was also used as the theme tune to Gok Wan's Channel 4 television programme called Gok's Fashion Fix.

In 2006, Rogue Traders went on the We're Coming Home Tour around Australia. They performed songs from Here Come the Drums, kicking off each show with "Believer" and ending with an encore of "Voodoo Child". The band also previewed songs which were subsequently included on their third album, Better in the Dark (2007), including the title track, "What You're On" and "Shout Out". By the end of 2007, Here Comes the Drums was certified 4× platinum by Australian Recording Industry Association (ARIA) for shipments in excess of 280,000 copies in Australia.

=== 2007–2008: Better In The Dark ===
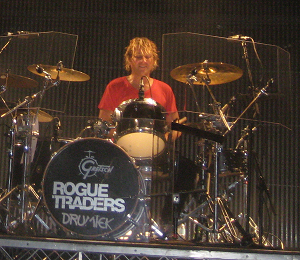
Cameron McGlinchey on drums for the Rogue Traders, during the Better in the Dark Tour, 2008.

In January 2007, Rogue Traders performed at the opening of the Australian Jamboree at Elmore, Victoria in front of a crowd of over 10,000. In April the group performed at the Melbourne Crown Casino, previewing some of their new songs. In May they supported British girl group Girls Aloud on The Sound of Girls Aloud: The Greatest Hits Tour. The Sunday Telegraph reported that "[t]he group's management confirmed the band had been in discussions with a major US label." Rogue Traders flew to the US in July where they launched their first single into the North American market. The group then signed Universal Music Group. Unfortunately, the song failed to gain much attention in the US.

In May 2007, Old Navy, a division of Gap, Inc. in North America, featured "Believer", "Watching You", and later, "World Go 'Round" in their Summerland commercials. In June Rogue Traders completed a tour of the UK and returned to Australia to finalise their third album. In September, the lead single, "Don't You Wanna Feel", was released: it debuted on the ARIA singles chart at number ten, and on the ARIA dance chart at number one. It premiered on Nova radio station in early September and two weeks later reached number one on the Hot30 Countdown. Better in the Dark was issued on 13 October. It was released in two forms; the standard form and a limited CD/DVD edition with international imports available later the following week. Better in the Dark made it to number four in the ARIA Albums Chart, and number one in the Australian Artists Chart. With the release of Better in the Dark, Here Come the Drums re-entered the charts at number forty-five, two years after its initial release, ultimately it appeared in the top 50 for 74 weeks. "Don't You Wanna Feel" was certified Gold (35,000+ copies sold) by ARIA. It was the group's third single to go Gold. Better in the Dark was also certified Platinum. Their second single, "Voodoo Child", went Platinum (70,000+ copies sold).

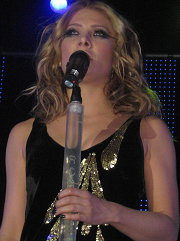
Bassingthwaighte performing during the Better in the Dark Tour in 2008

In January 2008, the second single, "I Never Liked You", from Better in the Dark, was issued, which peaked at number nine. On 1 February, Rogue Traders performed "Don't You Wanna Feel" and "I Never Liked You" at the Melbourne Cricket Ground Twenty/20 Cricket match as part of the half-time entertainment in front of a crowd of over 84,000. In April the third single, "What You're On" was issued, which peaked in the top 30. That same week it reached number eighteen on the Physical Singles Chart, number nine in the Australian Artists Singles Chart and number three on the Dance Chart.

Rogue Traders undertook the Better in the Dark Tour from 29 April to the beginning of June, playing venues around the country. The tour kicked off at the Regent Theatre in Yarram. The group played songs from all three albums: We Know What You're Up To, Here Come the Drums and Better in the Dark. They surprised some fans by playing their first top 10 single, "One of My Kind", a re-working of the INXS classic "Need You Tonight", but this time sung live by Bassingthwaighte. They also performed a cover of "Nothing Compares 2 U", the Prince song also covered by Sinéad O'Connor.

In June 2008, after the toured ended, Bassingthwaighte quit the band to focus on her acting and solo music career. A fourth single from the album had been planned, linked with a competition involving Ford. The competition was to answer in 25 words or less why they should feature in the new Rogue Traders video. The single was confirmed to be "On Your Way to the Disco", but it was never officially released as Bassingthwaighte had left. In July that year her then-boyfriend (they later married), McGlinchey, also left the band. Ash dismissed the idea that Bassingthwaighte's departure signalled the end of the band, stating that he had already started working on the next album, the fourth for the band.

=== 2009–2011: The Sound Of Drums and breakup ===
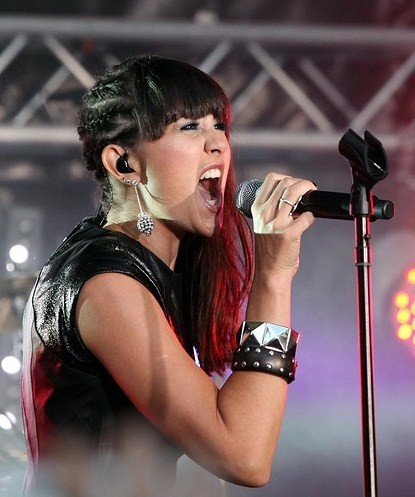
Mindi Jackson performing live in 2010

On 13 August 2009, Rogue Traders revealed that Henwood had returned on guitar and Spencer had left. On 14 November, Ash revealed via Twitter the names of their new singer, Melinda "Mindi" Jackson, and new drummer, Peter Marin. On 25 December 2009 (Christmas Day), "Love Is a War" was issued as a digital download single and then, on 8 January 2010, as a physical single. It peaked at number ninety. On 12 March "Would You Raise Your Hands?" was released as the follow-up single, which reached number ninety-five. "Hearts Beat as One" was issued as the third single on 11 June 2011 – it had been written for the Socceroos as the official anthem for their 2010 FIFA World Cup campaign. However, despite this, the song failed to chart, the Rogue Traders' first single to do so since 2002's "Need You to Show Me".

Night of the Living Drums, the band's fourth studio album, was initially set for release in June 2010, according to the band's official website. However it was pushed back for undisclosed reasons, then in December it was revealed the band had left Sony Music, after the label had refused to release the album. On 11 November 2011 Rogue Traders finally released Night of the Living Drums, after they had re-signed to Sony. It was released as part of The Sound of Drums which is a double album that includes a compilation disc, The Greatest Hits, and the studio recording, Night of the Living Drums. Ash described The Sound of Drums conception, "[t]he catalyst was when we realised we were coming up to the band's 10-year anniversary. We'd always talked about how much fun it would be to do a greatest hits one day, and we struck on the idea of doing a record that combined the two. I have to give credit to Sony, because they changed their minds about us – we brought this idea back to them and they went for it".

A radio edit of Night of the Living Drums cut America was serviced to Australian radio to promote the release, but failed to make an impact.

After a two-year media silence, Ash confirmed in a 2014 interview that the band had split shortly after being dropped by Sony Music.

=== 2015–2024: Reunion ===
On 15 December 2015, it was announced that Rogue Traders had reunited with Bassingthwaighte for a New Year's Eve reunion gig, after initially reforming earlier in September for a corporate show in Gold Coast. The band confirmed that Jackson had given the band's reunion her blessing. They have since performed at multiple events including the Formula 1 Australian Grand Prix, and co-headlining the Coates Hire Sydney 500 with Killing Heidi.

In 2017, after a stint on I'm a Celebrity...Get Me Out of Here!, Bassingthwaighte revealed the band are working on new music and had their first recording session in April 2017.

In February 2023, the Rogue Traders Released their first single in over a decade, "To the Disco", which interpolates an older Rogues track, "On Your Way to the Disco", released in 2007.

=== 2025–present: Midnight Alarms ===
In late 2025, Rogue Traders announced a new album titled Midnight Alarms to be released in 2026. In February 2026, the single "Take You Down" was released. On 8 September 2026, they released the single "Dirty Dirty Disco", in collaboration with Australian singer Dannii Minogue.

== Discography ==
- We Know What You're Up To (2003)
- Here Come the Drums (2005)
- Better in the Dark (2007)
- Night of the Living Drums (2011)
- Midnight Alarms (2026)

== Awards and nominations ==
As of 2008, Rogue Traders have been nominated for ten ARIA Awards, three MTV AVMA Awards, one The Nickelodeon Kids' Choice Awards, one Inside Film Award, and eight APRA Awards.

=== APRA Awards ===
The APRA Awards are presented annually from 1982 by the Australasian Performing Right Association (APRA) to "honour those composers and songwriters who have achieved the highest performances of their work and excellence in their craft over the previous year". They have won two awards in the category of "Most Performed Dance Work" (later renamed as "Dance Work of the Year") from eight nominations.

Year	Nominee / work	Award	Result
2003	"Give in to Me" – Rogue Traders (Jamie Appleby, Steve Davis, Josephine Armstead, Milton Middlebrook)	Most Performed Dance Work	Nominated
2004	"One of My Kind" – Rogue Traders (James Appleby, Steve Davis, Andrew Farriss, Michael Hutchence)	Most Performed Dance Work	Nominated
2006	"Way to Go!" – Rogue Traders (Jamie Appleby, Isaac Moran)	Most Performed Dance Work	Won
2007	"Way to Go!" – Rogue Traders (Jamie Appleby, Isaac Moran)	Most Performed Dance Work	Nominated
2007	"We're Coming Home" – Rogue Traders (Jamie Appleby, Melinda Appleby)	Most Performed Dance Work	Nominated
2008	"In Love Again" – Rogue Traders (Jamie Appleby, Melinda Appleby, Roland Orzabal, Curt Smith)	Dance Work of the Year	Won
2008	"Don't You Wanna Feel" – Rogue Traders (Jamie Appleby, Natalie Bassingthwaighte, Steven Davis, Dougal Drummond)	Dance Work of the Year	Nominated
2009	"Don't You Wanna Feel" – Rogue Traders (Jamie Appleby, Natalie Bassingthwaighte, Steven Davis, Dougal Drummond)	Dance Work of the Year	Nominated

=== ARIA Awards ===
The annual ARIA Music Awards are presented by the Australian Recording Industry Association since 1987. Rogue Traders have won one award from eleven nominations.

Year	Nominee / work	Award	Result
2003	"One of My Kind"	Best Dance Release	Won
2003	"One of My Kind"	Breakthrough Artist – Single	Nominated
2003	"One of My Kind" – Sam Bennetts, Rising Sun Pictures	Best Video	Nominated
2005	"Voodoo Child"	Best Dance Release	Nominated
2005	"Voodoo Child" – Sam Bennetts, Mad Angel	Best Video	Nominated
2005	"Voodoo Child" – James Ash	Engineer of the Year	Nominated
2006	Here Come the Drums	Best Pop Release	Nominated
2006	Here Come the Drums	Best Group	Nominated
2006	Here Come the Drums	Best Breakthrough Artist – Album	Nominated
2006	Here Come the Drums	Highest Selling Album	Nominated
2008	Better In The Dark - James Ash	Engineer of the Year	Nominated

=== MTV Australia Awards ===
MTV Australia Awards (previously MTV Australia Video Music Awards or AVMA) were presented annually by MTV Australia from 2005 to 2009. Rogue Traders won one award from three nominations.

Year	Nominee / work	Award	Result
2006	themselves	Spankin' New Aussie Artist	Nominated
2006	"Voodoo Child"	Best Dance Video	Won
2007	"In Love Again"	Best Dance Video	Nominated
