= Don't You Wanna Feel =

2007 single by Rogue Traders

Single by Rogue Traders

from the album Better in the Dark
- Released: 29 September 2007
- Recorded: 2007
- Length: 3:16
- Label: Columbia
- Songwriters: James Ash, Natalie Bassingthwaighte
- Producer: James Ash

Rogue Traders singles chronology
"In Love Again" (2006)	"Don't You Wanna Feel" (2007)	"I Never Liked You" (2008)

Music video
- "Don't You Wanna Feel'" on YouTube

"Don't You Wanna Feel" is a song written by James Ash and Natalie Bassingthwaighte for the Rogue Traders' third studio album Better in the Dark. It was released on schedule as the album's first single on 29 September 2007. It was leaked onto P2P networks on 7 September 2007.

At the end of August 2007, it was revealed on the official Rogue Traders forum that the single would soon be available for pre-order via mobile phone. Later, this was confirmed by Sony BMG, and for A$5.55 (including postage), fans could secure their own copy of the single, complete with signatures from band members. Both Natalie Bassingthwaighte & James Ash signed the disc sleeve.

At the APRA Awards of 2009, it won Dance Work of the Year.

== Chart performance ==
The song debuted and peaked at number 10 on the Australian ARIA Singles Chart on 8 October 2007, staying there for two weeks. It was certified gold by the Australian Recording Industry Association for shipping over 35,000 copies.

== Music video ==
The music video for "Don't You Wanna Feel" was filmed in Sydney in July 2007. The video is set in the Rogue Institute for the Gifted, a special hospital where gifted musicians are studied. Described by James Ash as "Grey's Anatomy meets Heroes", the video depicts Ash and Natalie Bassingthwaighte as doctors. Throughout the video they are shown observing patients performing instruments in strange ways. The music video concludes when Ash and Bassingthwaighte briefly disappear into one of the observation rooms, performing with the rest of the group.

Sony BMG announced that the music video would premiere on Network Ten News with Angela Bishop on 11 September 2007. The video, however, was not aired and instead premiered on the band's website the following day.

== Track listings ==
CD single / iTunes EP

1. "Don't You Wanna Feel" – 3:16
2. "Don't You Wanna Feel" (James Ash vs Kam Denny remix) – 6:15
3. "In Love Again" (Live at The Chapel) – 6:28

iTunes EP No. 2

1. "Don't You Wanna Feel" – 3:18
2. "Don't You Wanna Feel" (James Ash vs Kam Denny remix) – 6:17
3. "In Love Again" (Live at The Chapel) – 6:30
4. "Don't You Wanna Feel" (Deadmau5 Remix) – 6:13

== Charts ==
Chart (2007)	Peak position
Australia (ARIA)	10

== Certifications ==
Region	Certification	Certified units/sales
Australia (ARIA)	Gold	35,000^{^}
^{^} Shipments figures based on certification alone.

== Release history ==
Country	Date	Label	Format	Catalog
Australia	29 September 2007	Sony BMG	CD	88697171942
