= The Sound of Drums =

187b – "The Sound of Drums"
- Doctor Who episode

Cast
- Doctor: David Tennant – Tenth Doctor
- Companions: Freema Agyeman – Martha Jones; John Barrowman – Jack Harkness
- Others: John Simm – The Master; Adjoa Andoh – Francine Jones; Trevor Laird – Clive Jones; Gugu Mbatha-Raw – Tish Jones; Reggie Yates – Leo Jones; Alexandra Moen – Lucy Saxon; Elize du Toit – Sinister Woman; Nichola McAuliffe – Vivien Rook; Nicholas Gecks – Albert Dumfries; Colin Stinton – President; Olivia Hill – BBC Newsreader; Daniel Ming – Chinese Newsreader; Lachele Carl – US Newsreader; Sharon Osbourne – Herself; McFly – Themselves; Ann Widdecombe – Herself; Zoe Thorne, Gerard Logan, Johnnie Lyne-Pirkis – Sphere Voices

Production
- Directed by: Colin Teague
- Written by: Russell T Davies
- Produced by: Phil Collinson
- Executive producers: Russell T Davies; Julie Gardner
- Music by: Murray Gold
- Production code: 3.12
- Series: Series 3
- Running time: 2nd of 3-part story, 45 minutes
- First broadcast: 23 June 2007

Chronology
← Preceded by "Utopia"	Followed by → "Last of the Time Lords"

"The Sound of Drums" is the twelfth episode of the third series of the revived British science fiction television series Doctor Who. It was broadcast on BBC One on 23 June 2007. It is the second of three episodes that form a linked narrative, following "Utopia" and followed by "Last of the Time Lords".

In the episode, set in the 21st century, the alien time traveller the Master (John Simm) uses a network of mobile phone satellites to hypnotise the world and influence the population of the United Kingdom into electing him Prime Minister. Following the election, he makes contact with an invading race he calls the Toclafane.

== Plot ==
The Tenth Doctor, Jack, and Martha escape the Futurekind by using Jack's vortex manipulator to return to present-day London. They quickly learn that the Master has taken on the persona of Harold Saxon, and is the newly elected Prime Minister. The Master has created a phone network called Archangel which subliminally influenced the population to vote for him. The three narrowly avoid a bomb placed in Martha's flat and learn that Martha's family has been kidnapped by the Master's minions. The Master contacts them to gloat about his seeming victory, and reveals that the three are wanted criminals.

Hiding in an abandoned building, the Doctor uses parts of Martha's laptop and his TARDIS keys to create perception filters so they can move about unnoticed. He explains some of the Master's past and tells them how, as a child, the Master looked into the time vortex and was driven mad. They see a TV report that the Master is planning to reveal humanity's first contact the next day with an alien race known as the Toclafane. UNIT takes over the meeting and moves it to the flying aircraft carrier Valiant. The Master accepts the changes and boards the Valiant with his wife Lucy. The Doctor, Martha, and Jack teleport aboard and discover that the TARDIS has been converted by the Master into a Paradox Machine that is building up power to be activated at the appointed time of first contact.

The Doctor, Martha, and Jack enter the bridge of the Valiant as the first four Toclafane appear on board. The Master orders the Toclafane to kill US President Winters. The Master reveals that he can see around the perception filters, and uses his laser screwdriver to kill Jack and artificially age the Doctor 100 years using Professor Lazarus's genetic manipulation technology, (Note: A larger version of this technology appears in the 2007 episode "The Lazarus Experiment".) and DNA he took from the Doctor's severed hand (which Jack took aboard the TARDIS). (Note: As depicted in the 2007 episode "Utopia".) Jack, having been revived, gives Martha his vortex manipulator and tells Martha to get off the Valiant.

The Master brings Martha's family onto the bridge as the Paradox Machine activates. A massive rift opens above the Valiant, allowing six billion Toclafane to descend upon Earth and kill one-tenth of the Earth's population. Martha tends to the aged Doctor, and he whispers into her ear. She uses the vortex manipulator to teleport away, and promises to come back.

=== Continuity ===
Whilst the boy Master wears a black-and-white outfit like those worn by the first Time Lords seen on screen, in The War Games in 1969, the adult Time Lords are depicted dressed in the ceremonial robes first seen in The Deadly Assassin in 1976. Created by then BBC staff designer James Acheson prior to his film career, the huge stiff collars of these outfits remained the distinctive look for officials of the Doctor's race. The collars used were the originals, on loan from the Doctor Who Exhibition in Blackpool.

The Seal of Rassilon—the equally well-established Gallifreyan symbol employed by Acheson (originally in the non-Time Lord-related Revenge of the Cybermen)—appears here for the first time since its prominent use in the television movie.

When talking to the world's press cameras toward the end of the episode, the Master begins his speech "Peoples of the Earth, please attend carefully." This paraphrases part of a speech he gave in episode four of Logopolis (1981), which began "Peoples of the Universe, please attend carefully."

The Master is shown enjoying an episode of Teletubbies, continuing a fascination with children's television first seen in The Sea Devils (1972), when he was shown watching Clangers. He wryly analyses both series' characters, remarking how amazing it would be if they were real.

The Doctor had previously been prematurely aged in The Leisure Hive (1980).

=== Outside references ===
Writing in the episode's BBC Fact File, Peter Ware observes that the Master's introduction of the Jones family as having come "all the way from prison" is similar to the style used in the TV show This Is Your Life.

When the Master addresses the nation, he opens with 'Britain, Britain, Britain'. This is a reference to the popular British comedy Little Britain, which opened with Tom Baker's narrator saying the same. Tom Baker also played The Fourth Doctor.

== Production and publicity ==
Vote Saxon poster as seen in the episode.

This episode, along with "Utopia" and "Last of the Time Lords", are treated in several sources as a three-part story, the first such story in the revived series of Doctor Who. However, Russell T Davies has said that he regards "Utopia" as a separate story, but notes that the determination is arbitrary.

Some of the car action sequences in this episode were filmed by Freema Agyeman herself rather than a stunt double, and took place at Harbour View Road, Penarth. David Tennant's makeup in which he is aged 100 years was inspired by the First Doctor, William Hartnell.

The episode was advertised on BBC television with a spoof party political broadcast, featuring testimonials from British celebrities Sharon Osbourne, McFly and Ann Widdecombe showing their support for Mr Saxon, a version of which is seen in the episode itself. Also during the broadcast, drums can be heard. There is also a different trailer that showed still shots of the Doctor, Martha Jones and Captain Jack over the top of which Mr Saxon's speech, in which he says, "what this country really needs, right now, is a doctor", can be heard and at the end there is a small clip of him showing his trademark smile, making his intent to kill the Doctor public. The celebrity appearances in the episode itself differ from those in the trailer, most noticeably that of Ann Widdecombe, who appears alone in the trailer but alongside Mr Saxon in the episode. The BBC had created two fictional websites in connection with these episodes, www.votesaxon.co.uk and www.haroldsaxon.co.uk. The latter site, at one time, did replicate the video and web pages seen by the characters in "The Sound of Drums".

=== Cast notes ===
Lachele Carl previously appeared as the American news anchor in "Aliens of London", "World War Three", and "The Christmas Invasion". The spin-off website "Who is Doctor Who?" states her name as "Mal Loup". This is mangled French for "Bad Wolf". This newscaster's name has subsequently been specified in the end credits as "Trinity Wells".

Zoe Thorne previously voiced the Gelth in "The Unquiet Dead".* Olivia Hill played a TV Reporter in The Sarah Jane Adventures episode "Invasion of the Bane" (2007). William Hughes, who plays the young Master, played the even younger Casanova in the eponymous BBC serial written by Russell T. Davies, in which David Tennant plays the adult Casanova.

=== Music ===
The drumming motif used several times in the story bears similarities to the underbeat of the Doctor Who theme tune. "Voodoo Child" by Rogue Traders is played diegetically within this episode. The song, from the album Here Come the Drums, has the phrases "the sound of drums" and "here come the drums" in its lyrics. The Master cues the music track by triumphantly declaring "here come the drums" at the end of the episode.

== See also ==
- List of fictional prime ministers of the United Kingdom
