= Voodoo Child (Rogue Traders song) =

2005 single by Rogue Traders

Single by Rogue Traders

from the album Here Come the Drums
- Released: 30 May 2005
- Length: 3:57
- Label: Columbia, Sony BMG
- Songwriters: Elvis Costello, James Ash, Steve Davis
- Producer: James Ash

Rogue Traders singles chronology
| "Stay?" (2003) | "Voodoo Child" (2005) | "Way to Go!" (2005) |

Rogue Traders UK singles chronology
| "Voodoo Child" (2006) | "Watching You" (2006) |

Music video
- "Voodoo Child" on YouTube

"Voodoo Child" is a song written by Elvis Costello, James Ash, and Steve Davis and produced by Ash for Australian electronic rock band Rogue Traders' second album, Here Come the Drums (2005). It was the first single for the new member Natalie Bassingthwaighte. It was released as a CD single in Australia on 30 May 2005 as the first song released from the album. In 2006, it was released in the United Kingdom as a digital download and CD single.

The song samples the riff from Costello's "Pump It Up", and he receives credit in some printings of the album's liner notes. The song marked a move for Rogue Traders away from standard dance music and towards a more electro-punk sound. Upon its release, the song became a top-10 hit in Australia, New Zealand, and the United Kingdom. The music video, directed by Sam Bennetts and Mad Angel, was nominated for Best Video at the ARIA Music Awards of 2005.

== Promotion and chart performance ==
In Australia, the song was released without the promotion of the new band member Natalie Bassingthwaighte because the band wanted to release it knowing that people were buying it because they liked the song, instead of buying it for "celebrity value" (Bassingthwaighte was starring in Neighbours at the time of the single's release).

Bassingthwaighte in the music video.

"Voodoo Child" debuted at number 20 on the Australian ARIA Singles Chart and by its third week had ascended into the top 10, peaking at number nine. In its eighth week, it ascended to its peak position at number four and was certified Platinum by ARIA. The song spent an overall 21 weeks on the chart, and is to date the group's most successful single. In New Zealand, "Voodoo Child" also debuted at number 20, becoming the group's first entry and so far only on the chart. It peaked at number seven for two consecutive weeks there, becoming the group's first top-10 hit there, and spent a total of 16 weeks on the chart. It was later released in the UK in July 2006, and debuted at number 18 based on download sales one week prior to its physical release. "Voodoo Child" ascended and peaked at number three the following week, to become the group's first and so far only top-three hit. The song has also peaked at number 15 in Ireland, becoming the group's first top-20 hit there.

The song gained slight popularity in the United Kingdom after being featured in the series 3 episode of Doctor Who entitled "The Sound of Drums" that aired on 23 June 2007.

== Track listings ==
Australian CD single

1. "Voodoo Child" – 3:57
2. "Voodoo Child" (James Ash Lektric remix) – 5:38
3. "Voodoo Child" (12-inch mix) – 6:58
4. "Voodoo Child" (Fuzzy Hair remix) – 6:09
5. "Voodoo Child" (Fuzzy Hair instrumental) – 6:23

UK CD1

1. "Voodoo Child" (radio edit)
2. "Voodoo Child" (Fuzzy Hair remix)

UK CD2

1. "Voodoo Child" (radio edit)
2. "Voodoo Child" (Tom Neville Vox mix)
3. "Voodoo Child" (12-inch mix)
4. "Voodoo Child" (CD-Rom video)

German maxi-CD single

1. "Voodoo Child" (radio edit)
2. "Voodoo Child" (James Ash Lektric remix)
3. "Voodoo Child" (12-inch mix simple track)
4. "Voodoo Child" (Tom Neville Vox remix)
5. "Voodoo Child" (Fuzzy Hair remix)

== Charts ==
=== Weekly charts ===
| Chart (2005–2006) | Peak position |
|---|---|
| Australia (ARIA) | 4 |
| Australian Club Chart (ARIA) | 2 |
| Australian Dance (ARIA) | 1 |
| Europe (Eurochart Hot 100) | 10 |
| Ireland (IRMA) | 15 |
| New Zealand (Recorded Music NZ) | 7 |
| Scotland Singles (OCC) | 3 |
| UK Singles (OCC) | 3 |
| UK Dance (OCC) | 24 |

=== Year-end charts ===
| Chart (2005) | Position |
|---|---|
| Australia (ARIA) | 20 |
| Australian Club Chart (ARIA) | 10 |
| Australian Dance (ARIA) | 2 |

| Chart (2006) | Position |
|---|---|
| UK Singles (OCC) | 28 |

== Certifications ==
| Region | Certification | Certified units/sales |
|---|---|---|
| Australia (ARIA) | Platinum | 70,000^{^} |
| United Kingdom (BPI) | Silver | 200,000^{^} |
^{^} Shipments figures based on certification alone.

== Release history ==
| Region | Date | Format(s) | Label(s) | Ref. |
|---|---|---|---|---|
| Australia | 30 May 2005 | CD | Columbia; Sony BMG | |
| United Kingdom | 10 July 2006 | CD | Ariola; Sony BMG | |
