= In Love Again =

2006 single by Rogue Traders

Single by Rogue Traders

from the album Here Come the Drums
- Released: August 2006
- Genre: Dance
- Length: 3:40
- Label: Columbia
- Songwriter(s): James Appleby; Roland Orzabal; Curt Smith
- Producer(s): James Ash

Rogue Traders singles chronology
"We're Coming Home" (2006)	"In Love Again" (2006)	"Don't You Wanna Feel" (2007)

Music video
- "In Love Again" on YouTube

"In Love Again" is a song by Australian electronic rock group Rogue Traders. It was sent to radio in August 2006 as the fifth and final single in August 2006 from their second album Here Come the Drums. The coda of the song features a sample of "Head Over Heels" by Tears for Fears. At the APRA Awards of 2008, the song won Dance Work of the Year.

== Music video ==
The video for this song was filmed during the band's tour schedule and has snippets of previous performances. According to James Ash on the official forum, an early concept for a "In Love Again" video clip was to be an all-brown clip based on a wedding full of ghosts of past lovers, but the group instead opted for a different video.

== Charts ==
Radio singles were ineligible to chart on the official ARIA chart in 2006; however, it peaked at number 20 on the Australian Digital Tracks.

Chart (2006)	Peak position
Australian Digital Tracks (ARIA)	20

== In Love Again 2021 ==
"In Love Again 2021"

Single by Rogue Traders
- Released: 14 May 2021
- Label: Sony Music Australia

Rogue Traders singles chronology
"Hearts Beat as One" (2010)	"In Love Again 2021" (2021)

Audio video
- "In Love Again 2021" on YouTube

In 2021, The Rogue Traders re-released the song as "In Love Again 2021".

== Track listing ==
Digital single

1. "In Love Again 2021" (James Ash & Marcus Knight Radio edit) – 2:51

Digital remixes single

1. "In Love Again 2021" (James Ash & Marcus Knight Radio edit) – 2:51
2. "In Love Again 2021" (Supermini Radio edit) – 3:57
3. "In Love Again 2021" (James Ash & Marcus Knight extended) – 4:23
4. "In Love Again 2021" (Supermini Radio extended) – 6:27
5. "In Love Again 2021" (Andy Murphy remix) – 6:19
