= Hello Cleveland! =

- Founded: 2001
- Founder: One Louder Management
- Distributor(s): EMI / Sony
- Genre: Various
- Country of origin: Australia
- Location: Darlinghurst, New South Wales
- Official website: Hello Cleveland! Records

Hello Cleveland! is an independent record label based in Darlinghurst, New South Wales. Established by One Louder Entertainment (who manage Paul Kelly, Neil Finn, Kate Miller-Heidke, Alex The Astronaut and Ball Park Music) in 2001, their records were distributed by EMI in Australia and New Zealand.

The name is a reference to the film This Is Spinal Tap, in which the eponymous band becomes hopelessly lost in a maze of tunnels beneath the stage of their gig. One of the band members repeatedly says "Hello Cleveland!" in anticipation of actually finding the stage.

After several years of inactivity, in 2010 hello Cleveland! signed electronic pop act, Fatty Gets a Stylist, a side project of Miller-Heidke. Their self-titled debut album was released in October 2010.

== Artist roster ==
=== Current artists ===
- Fatty Gets a Stylist

=== Former artists ===
- Decoder Ring
- End of Fashion
- Goldenboy

== See also ==
- List of record labels
