= Watching You (Rogue Traders song) =

2006 single by Rogue Traders

Single by Rogue Traders

from the album Here Come the Drums
- Released: 30 January 2006
- Length: 3:28
- Label: Columbia; Sony BMG
- Songwriters: Doug Fieger; Berton Averre; James Ash; Melinda Appleby
- Producer: James Ash

Rogue Traders singles chronology
"Way to Go!" (2005)	"Watching You" (2006)	"We're Coming Home" (2006)

Music video
- "Watching You" on YouTube

"Watching You" is a song by Australian electronic rock band Rogue Traders, released on 30 January 2006 as the third single from their second album, Here Come the Drums (2005). The song was released in the United Kingdom in October 2006. "Watching You" replays the guitar riff from the Knack's song "My Sharona".

== Chart performance ==
"Watching You" was Rogue Traders' fourth top ten-10 in Australia and their second top-40 hit in the UK. It debuted on the Australian Singles Chart on 6 February 2006 at number seven. During its second week on the chart, it ascended to its peak position of number five and stayed there for two weeks. It remained in the top 10 for six weeks and the top 50 for 20 weeks, earning a gold certification from the Australian Recording Industry Association (ARIA). In the United Kingdom, the song entered the charts on 28 October 2006 at number 33, spending two weeks in the top 100.

== Track listings ==
Australian CD single

1. "Watching You" (original radio edit) – 3:29
2. "Watching You" (Dirty South vocal mix) – 7:00
3. "Watching You" (James Ash's 'Take Me Down' club mix) – 6:44
4. "Watching You" (Dirty South dub) – 6:59
5. "Way to Go!" (James Ash remix) – 6:43

UK 12-inch single

A1. "Watching You" (Chris Lake's Downtown vocal) – 6:52
B1. "Watching You" (Dirty South dub) – 6:59
B2. "Watching You" (original radio edit) – 3:29

UK CD1

1. "Watching You" (original radio edit)
2. "Watching You" (Olli Collins & Fred Portelli Remix)

UK CD2

1. "Watching You" (original radio edit)
2. "Watching You" (Chris Lake's Downtown Remix)
3. "Watching You" (Dirty South dub)
4. "Watching You" (Olli Collins & Fred Portelli Remix)
5. "Watching You" (James Ash's 'Take Me Down' club mix)
6. "Watching You" (video)
7. "Watching You" (U-MYX)

== Charts ==
=== Weekly charts ===
Chart (2006)	Peak position
Australia (ARIA)	5
Australian Dance (ARIA)	2
Ireland (IRMA)	46
Scotland Singles (OCC)	13
UK Singles (OCC)	33
UK Dance (OCC)	18

=== Year-end charts ===
Chart (2006)	Position
Australia (ARIA)	37
Australian Dance (ARIA)	6

== Certifications ==
Region	Certification	Certified units/sales
Australia (ARIA)	Gold	35,000^{^}
^{^} Shipments figures based on certification alone.

== Release history ==
Region	Date	Format(s)	Label(s)	Ref.
Australia	30 January 2006	CD	Columbia; Sony BMG Australia	
United Kingdom	16 October 2006	CD	Ariola; Sony BMG	
