= James Ash =

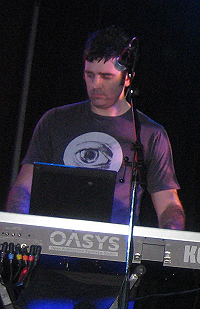
- Performing with Rogue Traders, May 2008

Background information
- Also known as: Faith in Technology; Thunderchild; Elan; Union State
- Born: Jamie Graham Appleby; 10 June 1973 (age 52); Windsor, Berkshire, England
- Origin: Melbourne, Victoria, Australia
- Genres: Electronic rock
- Occupations: Producer, musician, DJ
- Instruments: Keyboards, backing vocalist
- Years active: 1993–present
- Labels: Colossal, Vicious Vinyl, TV Rock, Sony BMG
- Member of: Rogue Traders

James Ash (born Jamie Graham Appleby; 10 June 1973), is an English-born Australian musician, songwriter and record producer. He is the co-founder and keyboardist of Australian electro-rock group Rogue Traders, where he plays the keyboard and guitar.

Ash was born in Windsor, Berkshire, England and his early schooling was at Wessex Gardens, Golders Green in North London and then Ashfold School in Buckinghamshire. He and his brother Gary then moved to Langwarrin, Victoria, Australia in 1982. The move only lasted 18 months, however, and the boys returned to the United Kingdom. Education continued at Paignton College, Devon – then Cheam High, Surrey. Ash moved back to Australia in 1988 for one year and undertook Year 11 at Sandringham Secondary College in Melbourne.

Ash began writing music in 1989 on an Amiga. Soon after returning to the United Kingdom in 1989, James met long-term collaborator Steve Davis who introduced him to Dance Music and DJing. Meanwhile, James completed his education at Carshalton College, Carshalton in 1992 and finally emigrated back once again to Melbourne, Victoria, Australia.

Ash joined Melbourne community based radio station Hitz FM in 1993 as an on-air announcer. He began DJing in clubs in late 1993.

Ash's first proper DJ gig was at Melbourne venue Lazar's and was acquired after he lied about his skills as a nightclub DJ. He had actually never DJ'ed in a nightclub before. Ash got dragged off after just ten minutes by the manager who told him he was rubbish. He convinced the manager to give him another try next week and came into the venue during the daytimes to practice.

Ash has been an active member of Australia's DJ fraternity since 1994, and has held residencies at most of Melbourne's leading clubs over the years.

Ash's first record released was Be With Me under the name Faith in Technology through Colossal Records. He quickly followed this up with Thunderchild under the moniker Thunderchild, released through leading Australian Dance label, Vicious Vinyl.

Since 1994 Ash has released over forty remixes and original productions under names including: Faith In Technology, Thunderchild, Elan, Union State and Rogue Traders.

In 1998 Ash turned 25 and moved to Melbourne dance radio station Kiss FM where he remained for the next few years.

In 2000 Ash and long-term collaborator Steve Davis changed the name of their production partnership from Union State to Rogue Traders.

In November 2008 after having enjoyed the success of two hit Rogue Traders albums and while working on the fourth Rogue Traders album, Ash released a dance song "Son of 91" on TV Rock's record label, making this track the first Ash had released under his own name. The track is a throwback to late eighties to early nineties dance music.

== Personal life ==
James is married to singer Melinda Appleby (née Richards) who appeared on the first Rogue Traders album We Know What You're Up To and continued to contribute to the writing of the following Rogue Traders albums.

== Awards and nominations ==
=== APRA Award ===
- 2009 Dance Work of the Year nomination for "Don't You Wanna Feel" written by Jamie Appleby, Steven Davis, Natalie Bassingthwaighte, Dougal Drummond.
