= Samantha Jade discography =

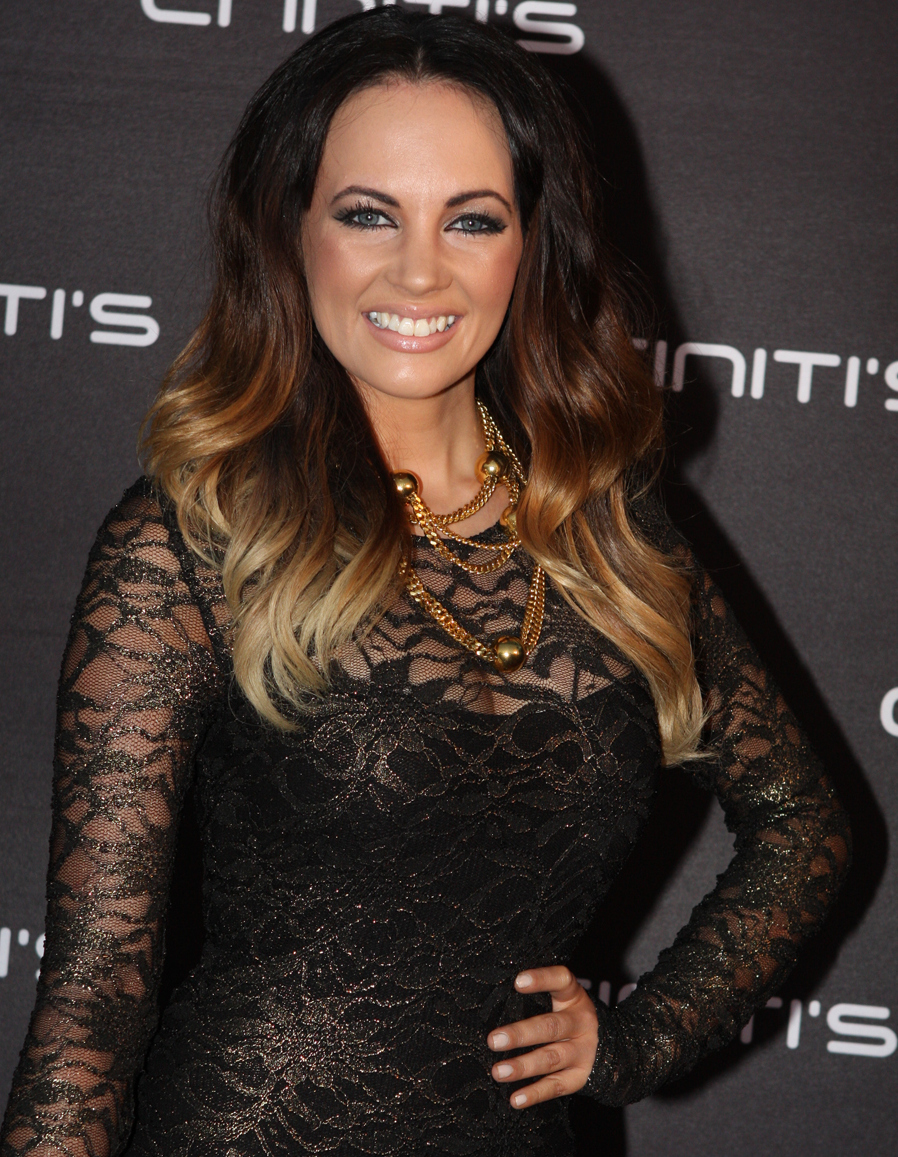
- Jade in 2013
- Studio albums: 4
- EPs: 2
- Singles: 25
- Music videos: 20
- Promotional singles: 10

The discography of Australian singer Samantha Jade consists of four studio albums, twenty-five singles (including four as a featured artist), ten promotional singles and eleven music videos. After being announced as the winner of the fourth season of The X Factor Australia in 2012, Jade released her winner's single "What You've Done to Me", which debuted at number one on the ARIA Singles Chart and was certified triple platinum by the Australian Recording Industry Association for sales of 210,000 copies.

== Studio albums ==
List of albums, with selected chart positions and certifications
| Title | Details | Peak chart positions | Certifications |
| Title | Details | AUS | Certifications |
|---|---|---|---|
| Samantha Jade | Released: 7 December 2012; Label: Sony Music Australia; Formats: CD, digital download | 3 | ARIA: Platinum |
| Nine | Released: 20 November 2015; Label: Sony Music Australia; Formats: CD, digital download | 11 | |
| Best of My Love | Released: 20 April 2018; Label: Sony Music Australia; Formats: CD, digital download, streaming | 6 | |
| The Magic of Christmas | Released: 2 November 2018; Label: Sony Music Australia; Formats: CD, digital download, streaming | 20 | |

== Extended plays ==
| Title | Details |
|---|---|
| Fusions, Vol. 2 (with Nathaniel) | Released: 20 January 2016; Label: Sony Music Australia; Formats: Digital download |
| Love.Sick Volume 1 | Released: 25 November 2022; Label: Midnight Records; Formats: Digital download |
| Love.Sick Volume 2 | Released: 16 August 2024; Label: 3Keys Records; Formats: Digital download |

== Singles ==
=== As lead artist ===
List of singles as lead artist, with selected chart positions and certifications shown
| Title | Year | Peak chart positions | | | Certifications | Album |
| Title | Year | AUS | KOR | US Pop | Certifications | Album |
|---|---|---|---|---|---|---|
| "Step Up" | 2006 | — (Note: "Step Up" did not enter on the ARIA Singles Chart, but peaked at number 50 on the ARIA Digital Track Chart.) | — | 92 | | Step Up (Original Soundtrack) |
| "Turn Around" | 2007 | 53 | — | — | | Non-album singles |
| "Secret" | 2009 | — | — | — | | Non-album singles |
| "What You've Done to Me" | 2012 | 1 | 28 | — | ARIA: 4× Platinum | Samantha Jade |
| "Firestarter" | 2013 | 9 | 43 | — | ARIA: 2× Platinum | Non-album singles |
| "Soldier" | 2013 | 17 | — | — | ARIA: 2x Platinum | Non-album singles |
| "I Am Australian" (with Dami Im, Jessica Mauboy, Justice Crew, Nathaniel and Taylor Henderson) | 2014 | 51 | — | — | | Non-album singles |
| "Up!" | 2014 | 18 | — | — | ARIA: Platinum | Non-album singles |
| "Sweet Talk" | 2014 | 38 | — | — | ARIA: Gold | Non-album singles |
| "Shake That" (featuring Pitbull) | 2015 | 32 | — | — | ARIA: Gold | Nine |
| "Always" | 2016 | 28 | — | — | ARIA: Platinum | Nine |
| "Hurt Anymore" (with Cyrus) | 2016 | 45 | — | — | | Non-album singles |
| "Circles on the Water" | 2017 | — | — | — | | Non-album singles |
| "Best of My Love" | 2018 | — | — | — | | Best of My Love |
| "Roller Skates" | 2018 | — | — | — | | Best of My Love |
| "Bounce" | 2019 | — (Note: "Bounce" did not enter the ARIA Singles Chart, but peaked at number 29 on the ARIA Digital Track Chart.) | — | — | ARIA: Gold | Non-album singles |
| "In the Morning" | 2020 | — | — | — | | Non-album singles |
| "Back 2 Back" | 2020 | — | — | — | | Non-album singles |
| "New Boy" | 2020 | — | — | — | | Non-album singles |
| "Dance Again" | 2022 | — | — | — | | Love.Sick Volume 1 |
| "Love.Sick" | 2022 | — | — | — | | Love.Sick Volume 1 |
| "Let's Hear It for the Boy" | 2022 | — | — | — | | Love.Sick Volume 1 |
| "Christmas Kiss" | 2023 | — | — | — | | Non-album single |
| "Peachy" | 2024 | — | — | — | | Love.Sick Volume 2 |
| "Very That" | 2026 | — | — | — | | Non-album single |
"—" denotes a recording that did not chart or was not released in that territory.

=== As featured artist ===
List of singles as featured artist, with selected chart positions shown
| Title | Year | Peak chart positions | Album |
| Title | Year | NZ Artist | Album |
|---|---|---|---|
| "Breakeven" (with Novita Dewi) | 2013 | — | Non-album single |
| "Start Again" (Stan Walker featuring Samantha Jade) | 2015 | 13 | Born to Dance |
| "Forget It All" (Sunset City featuring Samantha Jade) | 2019 | — | Non-album singles |
| "Choir" (Guy Sebastian featuring Samantha Jade) | 2019 | — | Non-album singles |

=== Promotional singles ===
List of promotional singles
| Title | Year | Album |
|---|---|---|
| "Always and Forever" (featuring Will Singe) | 2014 | Non-album singles |
| "Raised on a Summer Sun" (with Justice Crew) | 2015 | Non-album singles |
| "Armour" | 2015 | Non-album singles |
| "What You Want" | 2015 | Nine |
| "Born to Be Alive" | 2015 | Nine |
| "All I Want for Christmas" (with Nathaniel) | 2015 | Non-album singles |
| "Nothing Without You" | 2017 | Non-album singles |
| "With a Little Help from My Friends" (with various female artists) | 2017 | Non-album singles |
| "Home" | 2018 | The Magic of Christmas |
| "Beautiful and Golden (The Sisterhood Song)" | 2021 | Non-album single |

== Other charted songs ==
| Title | Year | Peak chart positions | Album |
| Title | Year | AUS | Album |
|---|---|---|---|
| "Stronger (What Doesn't Kill You)" | 2012 | 96 | Samantha Jade |
| "Where Have You Been" | 2012 | 51 | Samantha Jade |
| "Heartless" | 2012 | 12 | Samantha Jade |
| "Breakeven" | 2012 | 87 | Samantha Jade |

== Album appearances ==
| Title | Year | Album | Other artist(s) |
|---|---|---|---|
| "Come Back" | 2007 | 1000x | André |
| "I Need You Now" | 2009 | One Love | David Guetta, Laidback Luke |
| "Winning" | 2009 | Strange: The Adventures of Microphone Robinson | Microb |
| Tracks 1–11, 13–18 | 2010 | Glee: The Music, Volume 4 | various artists |
| "I'll Be There" | 2015 | Truth & Soul | Stan Walker |
| "I Feel the Earth Move" | 2017 | Beautiful – A Tribute to Carole King | various artists |
| "Joy to the World" | 2017 | Love Child Season 4 | various artists |
| "Made of Heart" | 2025 | Hindi Vindi | Guy Sebastian featuring Samantha Jade and others |

== Music videos ==
| Title | Year | Director |
|---|---|---|
| "Step Up" | 2006 | Scott Wining |
| "Turn Around" | 2007 | Kevin DeFreitas |
| "Secret" | 2009 | Valerie Babayan |
| "What You've Done to Me" | 2012 | Marc Furmie |
| "Firestarter" | 2013 | Christopher Frey |
| "Soldier" | 2013 | Brittany Stovin-Bradford |
| "Up!" (original and Socceroos mixes) | 2014 | Lawrence Lim |
| "Sweet Talk" | 2014 | ORFN |
| "Raised on a Summer Sun" (with Justice Crew) | 2015 | Alex Vivian |
| "Shake That" (featuring Pitbull) | 2015 | Gracie Otto |
| "Start Again" (Stan Walker featuring Samantha Jade) | 2015 | Shae Sterling |
| "All I Want for Christmas" (with Nathaniel) | 2015 | Sony Music Australia |
| "Always" | 2016 | Nik Kacevski |
| "Hurt Anymore" (with Cyrus) | 2016 | Anthony Rose, Jonathan Hairman |
| "Circles on the Water" | 2017 | Max Walter |
| "Roller Skates" | 2018 | Rodrigo Vidal Dawson |
| "I'm Coming Out" | 2018 | Rodrigo Vidal Dawson |
| "How Deep Is Your Love" | 2018 | Rodrigo Vidal Dawson |
| "Best of My Love" | 2018 | Rodrigo Vidal Dawson |
| "Best of My Love" (remix) | 2018 | Jarryd Hall |
| "This Candle Time of Year" | 2018 | Sony Music Australia |
| "Bounce" | 2019 | James Chappell |
| "In the Morning" (visualiser) | 2020 | Kerrod Cooper, Sam Horton |
| "Back 2 Back" | 2020 | Bonnie Hansen |
| "New Boy" | 2020 | James Chappell |
| "Nobody Does Me Better" | 2023 | Samantha Jade |
| "Christmas Kiss" | 2023 | Samantha Jade |
| "Very That" | 2026 | Alex Gibbs |
