= Armour (Samantha Jade song) =

Promotional single by Samantha Jade
- A-side: "Shake That"
- Released: 14 August 2015
- Recorded: 2015
- Genre: Synthpop
- Length: 3:15
- Label: Sony
- Songwriters: Samantha Jade; Jon Levine; Carmen Reece
- Producer: Jon Levine

Audio video
- "Armour" on YouTube

"Armour" is a song recorded by Australian singer Samantha Jade. "Armour" was written by Jade, Jon Levine and Carmen Reece, and produced by Levine. The song is an outtake from Jade's second studio album Nine. It was initially released as an exclusive B-side on the CD single of the album's lead single "Shake That" on 17 July 2015, but after a positive reception from fans, the song was later released as a stand-alone promotional single to digital retailers and streaming services one month later on 14 August 2015.

== Background and composition ==
"Armour" was written by Jade, Jon Levine and Carmen Reece in Los Angeles in early 2015. Levine also produced and engineered the track, while mixing was handled by Brian Paturalski and mastering was handled by Tom Coyne at Sterling Sound, NY. Additional background vocals were provided by Reece. Jade and Reece would further collaborate on two more songs, A-side "Shake That", and follow-up single "Always", which was also co-written and produced by Levine.

Musically, "Armour" is a mid-tempo synthpop song. Lyrically, the song reflects how during trying times Jade puts on a brave face to convince others that everything is fine, when in reality she is breaking on the inside. "Armour" is considered one of Jade's most personal songs, and is thought to be referencing how she dealt with her late mother's passing in June 2014. When asked what inspired her to write "Armour" during a fan Q&A, Jade responded, "I wrote Armour because we are all dealing with something and put a smile on our faces and that's ok!"

== Rejection and release ==
After the release of her 2014 single "Sweet Talk", Jade announced her upcoming second studio album was set for an early 2015 release. However, the album was pushed back yet again, presumably as the direction for the record had changed. It is believed that "Armour" was a leftover track from these earlier sessions.

Although "Armour" did not make the final cut for Jade's second studio album Nine, it was released as an exclusive B-side on the CD single of the album's lead single "Shake That" on 17 July 2015. The song was uploaded online on the same day, and was met with acclaim from fans. Mike Wass of music blog Idolator compared the song to various B-sides from Australian singer Kylie Minogue, calling it, "an absolute gem," and claiming, "Armour is probably the best thing the 28-year-old has released since 2012 chart-topper What You’ve Done To Me."

Due to the song's positive reception online, "Armour" was later released as a stand-alone promotional single to digital retailers and streaming services one month later on 14 August 2015.

== Artwork ==
The promotional single cover for "Armour" uses a black and white variant of the same photograph used for the "Shake That" official single cover. Jade's name is written in a bright pink, with the song's title written in black underneath. The cover was photographed by American singer-songwriter and longtime friend of Jade, Zac Poor, and designed by Poor and Sony DADC.

== Track listing ==
Digital download
No.	Title	Length
1.	"Armour"	3:15

"Shake That" CD single
No.	Title	Length
1.	"Shake That" (featuring Pitbull)	3:39
2.	"Armour"	3:15
Total length:		6:54

== Release history ==
Region	Date	Format	Label	Catalogue
Australia	17 July 2015	CD single	Sony Music Australia	88875092082
Australia	14 August 2015	Digital download	Sony Music Australia	—N/a
