= Love in Stereo =

Love in Stereo may refer to:

- "Love in Stereo" (song), a 2008 song by Ola Svensson
- Love in Stereo (Rahsaan Patterson album), 1999
- Love in Stereo (Carmen Reece album), 2010, or its title track
- Love in Stereo, a 2024 album by Max Schneider
- "Love in Stereo", a 1979 song by The Monks from Bad Habits
- "Love in Stereo", a 1990 song by Warrant from Cherry Pie
- "Love in Stereo", a 1996 song by High Frequency, sung by Clara Moroni and Elena Ferretti
- "Love in Stereo", a 2008 song by Donnie Klang from Just a Rolling Stone
- "Love in Stereo", a 2013 song by Sky Ferreira from Night Time, My Time
