= Carmen Reece =

English-American musician

- Also known as: Carmen Reece
- Origin: London, England
- Genres: Pop, R&B, soul
- Occupations: Singer-songwriter, record producer, musician
- Instruments: Vocals, piano, flute
- Years active: 2010–present
- Website: www.carmenreece.com

Carmen Reece, is an English singer, songwriter, musician and producer based in Los Angeles, California. An accomplished pianist and flautist from childhood, Carmen penned her first song aged 11 and has since worked and written for artists such as Ariana Grande, Kanye West, Craig David, Destiny Rogers, Samantha Jade, and Nathan Sykes. Reece also has provided background vocals, vocal production, and vocal arrangement for artists. Her debut album Love in Stereo was released in 2010 and her debut EP was released in 2020.

== Early life ==
Reece was born and raised in London. As a child, she played the flute and piano, participated in ballet and tap dancing, and practiced singing and songwriting. She graduated from the BRIT School.

== Career ==
Reece began her music career with singles in England, and songwriting for other artists.Her first singles were titled "How Freaky Can You Get" and "You Got Me," both released in the UK. Her first album Love in Stereo was released in the summer of 2010. "Right Here" was released as the lead single. The song reached No. 3 in the US on the Dance/Mix Show Airplay chart.

In 2014, Carmen signed her first publishing deal to Universal Music under Donna Caseine and mid 2019 signed her second deal to UMPG. She has worked with writers and producers including Rodney Jerkins, Harmony Samuels, Theron Thomas, Tommy Brown, Tricky Stewart, Dem Jointz, Stereotypes, RedOne, Carole Bayer Sager, Fraser T. Smith and R. City.

In the end of 2018, Reece released the first single called "Friday" from her upcoming 80's-pop self-titled album. The second single, "Say It," was released in early 2019. Eventually, the album was renamed as Evoke and was released as her debut EP in May 2020.

== Songwriting credits ==
Year	Artist(s)	Album	Song	Ref
2007	Eva Avila	Somewhere Else	"Fallin' for You"	
2013	Namie Amuro	Feel	"Stardust in My Eyes"	
2013	Ariana Grande	Yours Truly	"Right There"	
2013	Ariana Grande	Yours Truly	"Almost Is Never Enough"	
2013	Jessica Mauboy	Beautiful	"Can I Get a Moment?"	
2014	Guy Sebastian	Madness	"Madness"	
2014	Guy Sebastian	Madness	"Animal in Me"	
2014	Teyana Taylor	VII	"Put Your Love On"	
2014	Ariana Grande	My Everything	"You Don't Know Me"	
2014	Ariana Grande	My Everything	"Too Close"	
2014	Jasmine V	That's Me Right There	"That's Me Right There"	
2014	Jasmine V	That's Me Right There	"Me Without You"	
2014	Michelle Williams	Journey to Freedom	"Believe in Me"	
2014	Michelle Williams	Journey to Freedom	"Say Yes"	
2015	Fifth Harmony	Hotel Transylvania 2	"I'm in Love with a Monster"	
2015	Saara	Non-album single	"Ur Cool"	
2015	Samantha Jade	Nine	"Always"	
2015	Samantha Jade	Nine	"Shake That"	
2016	Major	I Am Major.	"Hit the Road"	
2016	K. Michelle	More Issues Than Vogue	"Make the Bed"	
2016	Nathan Sykes	Unfinished Business	"Over and Over Again"	
2016	Nathan Sykes	Unfinished Business	"Money"	
2016	Nathan Sykes	Unfinished Business	"I Can't Be Mad"	
2016	Nathan Sykes	Unfinished Business	"Famous"	
2016	Sabina Ddumba	Homeward Bound	"Not Too Young"	
2017	K. Michelle	Kimberly: The People I Used to Know	"Woman of My Word"	
2017	Tamar Braxton	Bluebird of Happiness	"Blind"	
2017	Anja Nissen	Where I Am	"Tears Ago"	
2017	Craig David	The Time Is Now	"I Know You"	
2017	Stanaj	From a Distance	"Bad Woman"	
2017	La'Porsha Renae	Already All Ready	"Hideout"	
2017	Toby Randall	One	"Landslide"	
2018	Wiley	Godfather II	"Crash"	
2018	Ciara	Beauty Marks	"Dose"	
2018	Jordan Smith	Only Love	"Love Her Better"	
2018	Jordan Smith	Only Love	"Box"	
2018	Jordan Smith	Only Love	"Lonely Eyes"	
2018	Jordan Smith	Only Love	"Beauty Lies"	
2018	Kanye West	Ye	"Ghost Town"	
2019	Destiny Rogers	Tomboy	"Tomboy"	
2019	Destiny Rogers	Tomboy	"LockDown"	
2019	Samantha Jade	Non-album single	"Bounce"	
2019	Now United	Non-album single	"Who Would Think That Love?"	
2019	Now United	Non-album single	"How We Do It"	
2020	Destiny Rogers	Great Escape	"Euphoria"	
2020	Destiny Rogers	Great Escape	"Kickin' Pushin'"	
2022	Kai, Seulgi, Jeno & Karina	2022 Winter SM Town: SMCU Palace	"Hot & Cold"	
2024	Twice	Dive	"Dive"	
2025	Twice	Enemy	"Enemy"	
2025	Twice	Ten: The Story Goes On	"Dive In" (Tzuyu solo)	
2025	Itzy	Collector	"I. I. Know Me"	

== Vocal production ==
Year	Artist(s)	Album	Song	Ref
2013	Zendaya	Zendaya	"Fireflies"	
2014	Michelle Williams	Journey to Freedom	"Believe in Me"	
2014	Michelle Williams	Journey to Freedom	"Say Yes"	
2015	Samantha Jade	Nine	"Always"	
2015	Samantha Jade	Nine	"Shake That"	
