= Over and Over Again =

- Ariana Grande remix cover

Single by Nathan Sykes

from the album Unfinished Business
- Released: 18 October 2015
- Length: 4:07
- Label: Global
- Songwriters: Nathan Sykes; Harmony Samuels; Carmen Reece; Major Johnson Finley
- Producers: Harmony Samuels; Nathan Sykes

Nathan Sykes singles chronology
| "Kiss Me Quick" (2015) | "Over and Over Again" (2015) | "Give It Up" (2016) |

Ariana Grande singles chronology
| "Boys Like You" (2015) | "Over and Over Again" (remix) (2016) | "Dangerous Woman" (2016) |

Music video
- "Over and Over Again" on YouTube

"Over and Over Again" is a song by English singer Nathan Sykes, written by Sykes, alongside Harmony Samuels, Carmen Reece, and Major Johnson Finley. It was released on 18 October 2015, as the second single from his debut studio album, Unfinished Business (2016). The song peaked at number eight on the UK Singles Chart. A remix featuring American singer-songwriter Ariana Grande was also released as a single on 15 January 2016.

== Live performances ==
Sykes performed the song live on The X Factor on 22 November 2015. He also performed a stripped-down version of the song on The Late Late Show with James Corden, and sang a version of it at the 2016 Summertime Ball with Louisa Johnson.

== Music video ==
A music video to accompany the release of "Over and Over Again" was first released onto YouTube on 28 October 2015. It starred newcomer actress Maemae Renfrow of the future Nickelodeon show Hunter Street as the love interest.

== Track listing ==
Digital download
| No. | Title | Length |
|---|---|---|
| 1. | "Over and Over Again" | 4:07 |

Digital download – Remixes
| No. | Title | Length |
|---|---|---|
| 1. | "Over and Over Again" (Cahill remix) (radio edit) | 3:13 |
| 2. | "Over and Over Again" (Elephante original remix) | 3:34 |
| 3. | "Over and Over Again" (Cahill remix) | 6:45 |
| 4. | "Over and Over Again" (Elephante remix) | 4:46 |

Digital download
| No. | Title | Length |
|---|---|---|
| 1. | "Over and Over Again" (Jumpsmokers remix) | 3:49 |

Digital download
| No. | Title | Length |
|---|---|---|
| 1. | "Over and Over Again" (featuring Ariana Grande) | 4:09 |

Digital download – Acoustic Guitar Sessions
| No. | Title | Length |
|---|---|---|
| 1. | "Over and Over Again" (Acoustic guitar version) | 4:24 |
| 2. | "Kiss Me Quick" (Acoustic guitar version) | 3:25 |

== Charts ==
=== Weekly charts ===
| Chart (2015–16) | Peak position |
|---|---|
| Scotland Singles (OCC) | 6 |
| South Korea International Chart (Gaon) (Remix featuring Ariana Grande) | 15 |
| UK Singles (OCC) | 8 |
| UK Indie (OCC) | 2 |
| US Adult Contemporary (Billboard) (Remix featuring Ariana Grande) | 16 |
| US Dance Club Songs (Billboard) (Remix featuring Ariana Grande) | 1 |
| US Pop Airplay (Billboard) (Remix featuring Ariana Grande) | 29 |

=== Year-end charts ===
| Chart (2016) | Position |
|---|---|
| US Adult Contemporary (Billboard) (featuring Ariana Grande) | 41 |
| US Dance Club Songs (Billboard) (featuring Ariana Grande) | 26 |

== Release history ==
| Region | Date | Format | Version | Label | Ref. |
|---|---|---|---|---|---|
| United Kingdom | 18 October 2015 | Digital download | Solo | Global | |
| United Kingdom | 21 November 2015 | Digital download | Jumpsmokers remix | Global | |
| United Kingdom | 21 November 2015 | Digital download | Remixes | Global | |
| United Kingdom | 23 November 2015 | Digital download | Acoustic Guitar Sessions | Global | |
| United Kingdom | 15 January 2016 | Digital download | Ariana Grande remix | Global | |
| United States | 15 January 2016 | Digital download | Ariana Grande remix | Global | |
| United States | 2 March 2016 | Contemporary hit radio | Ariana Grande remix | Global | |

== See also ==
- List of number-one dance singles of 2016 (U.S.)
