= The Magic of Christmas (Samantha Jade album) =

Studio album by Samantha Jade
- Released: 2 November 2018
- Recorded: 2018
- Genre: Christmas
- Length: 41:18
- Label: Sony

Samantha Jade chronology
Best of My Love (2018)	The Magic of Christmas (2018)

The Magic of Christmas is the fourth studio album by Australian singer Samantha Jade, and was released through Sony Music Australia on 2 November 2018. It is her third album of covers following her debut album and previous album Best of My Love.

At the ARIA Music Awards of 2019, The Magic of Christmas was nominated for Best Adult Contemporary Album.

== Background ==
In a statement regarding the album, Jade said: "Christmas is my favourite time of year, and spending Christmas at home with my loved ones has always been a precious tradition for me. I hope my fans find the same joy sharing this music with their families and friends."

Regarding the release of two albums in the same year (her previous album Best of My Love being released seven months prior), Jade described the achievement as "wild", and stated that "I think it is rare to have two albums out in this day and age, so it is really humbling and nice to be able to say, I have two records out".

== Reception ==
Professional ratings
Review scores
Source	Rating
auspOp	3/5 stars

David from auspOp described the album as "a lovely traditional Christmas album" adding " but it certainly isn't innovative or fresh". David said the album "...lands squarely in the middle of the road. It lacks the grandeur and budget an artist of Samantha Jade's calibre deserves." adding the album "feels undercooked."

In 2019 the nominations for the ARIA Music Awards of 2019 were announced, with The Magic of Christmas included in the nominations for the Best Contemporary Album.

== Track listing ==
No.	Title	Writer(s)	Length
1.	"I'll Be Home for Christmas"	Kim Gannon, Walter Kent	3:23
2.	"White Christmas"	Irving Berlin	2:31
3.	"Santa Baby"	Joan Javits, Philip Springer, Tony Springer	3:18
4.	"The Magic of Christmas" (featuring Guy Sebastian)		3:16
5.	"Have Yourself a Merry Little Christmas"	Hugh Martin, Ralph Blane	3:21
6.	"Blue Christmas"	Billy Hayes, Jay W. Johnson	3:07
7.	"The Christmas Song"	Bob Wells, Mel Tormé	3:12
8.	"Silver Bells"	Jay Livingston, Ray Evans	2:26
9.	"Silent Night"	Traditional	3:16
10.	"O Holy Night"	Traditional	3:45
11.	"Home"	Samantha Jade, Peter Holz, Zac Poor	3:06
12.	"Amazing Grace"	Traditional	2:42
13.	"This Candle Time of Year"	Jade, Graeme Press	3:55

== Charts ==
Chart (2018)	Peak position
Australian Albums (ARIA)	20

== Release history ==
Region	Date	Format	Label	Catalogue
Australia	2 November 2018	CD, digital download	Sony Music Australia	19075898622
