= Kiss Me Quick (Nathan Sykes song) =

Single by Nathan Sykes

from the album Unfinished Business
- Released: 28 June 2015
- Recorded: 2014
- Genre: Pop; R&B; soul
- Length: 3:07
- Label: Global Entertainment
- Songwriters: Nathan Sykes; Ali Tennant; Jin Choi; Greg Bonnick; Hayden Chapman
- Producers: Choi; LDN Noise

Nathan Sykes singles chronology
"Kiss Me Quick" (2015)	"Over and Over Again" (2015)

Music video
- "Kiss Me Quick" on YouTube

"Kiss Me Quick" is a song by English singer Nathan Sykes. The song was released in the United Kingdom on 28 June 2015 as the lead single from his debut studio album Unfinished Business (2016). The song was written by Nathan Sykes, Ali Tennant, Jin Choi, Greg Bonnick and Hayden Chapman. The song peaked at number 14 on the UK Singles Chart and number 19 on the Scottish Singles Chart. The song also peaked at number one on the Dance Club Songs chart.

== Background ==
In an interview with Capital FM, Nathan said, "It just came around, when we were out just outside of London in the countryside, I was working with LDN Noise and we were just chatting about nonsense and I just said, I'm really bad at flirting, honestly. Revealed during his shoot for Schön magazine. "So we wrote a song that can flirt for me, it's as simple as that. "Obviously with the album there are songs that are a lot deeper lyrically and a lot are very personal to me about relationship and things that I've gone through and this was just as simple. We were just laughing and joking about the fact that I can't flirt. So that's what we wrote "Kiss Me Quick" about and it ended up being my debut single."

== Live performances ==
Sykes performed the song live for the first time on 8 April 2015 at O2 ABC Glasgow. In June 2015, he performed an acoustic version of the song in a special session for Shazam.

== Music video ==
A music video to accompany the release of "Kiss Me Quick" was first released onto YouTube on 21 May 2015 at a total length of three minutes and eighteen seconds.

== Track listing ==
Digital download – single
No.	Title	Length
1.	"Kiss Me Quick"	3:07

Digital download – EP
No.	Title	Length
1.	"Kiss Me Quick" (Brookes Brothers Remix)	3:21
2.	"Kiss Me Quick" (Instrumental)	3:08
3.	"Wait For You"	2:50
4.	"More Than You'll Ever Know" (Acoustic)	3:34

Digital download – remixes
No.	Title	Length
1.	"Kiss Me Quick" (Jump Smokers Remix)	3:27
2.	"Kiss Me Quick" (DiscoTech Remix)	4:55
3.	"Kiss Me Quick" (Fred Falke Remix)	3:51
4.	"Kiss Me Quick" (DJ Mike D Remix)	2:54

== Charts ==
=== Weekly charts ===
Chart (2015)	Peak position
Belgium (Ultratip Bubbling Under Flanders)	80
Scotland (OCC)	19
UK Singles (OCC)	14
UK Indie (Official Charts Company)	2
US Dance Club Songs (Billboard)	1
US Mainstream Top 40 (Billboard)	37

=== Year-end charts ===
Chart (2015)	Position
US Dance Club Songs (Billboard)	15

== Release history ==
Region	Date	Format	Label
United Kingdom	28 June 2015	Digital download	Global Entertainment
