= Best of My Love (album) =

Studio album by Samantha Jade
- Released: 20 April 2018
- Recorded: 2017–18
- Genre: Electro-pop, dance-pop, disco
- Length: 47:50
- Label: Sony

Samantha Jade chronology
Nine (2015)	Best of My Love (2018)	The Magic of Christmas (2018)

Singles from Best of My Love
- 1. "Best of My Love" Released: 23 February 2018; 2. "Roller Skates" Released: 2 March 2018

Best of My Love is the third studio album by Australian singer Samantha Jade, released through Sony Music Australia on 20 April 2018. It is her second album of covers after her debut album Samantha Jade (2012).

== Background ==
On 10 January 2018, CEO of Sony Music Australia Denis Handlin confirmed that a concept album was due to be released by Jade later in 2018.

In a press release on 22 February 2018, Jade announced the release of the album and stated that “Best of My Love" was such a fun record to make. I hope it reignites the passion of all disco lovers and helps tell the story of this exciting genre to a whole new audience that may not have experienced the lifestyle first-hand. It’s such an honor to pay tribute to some of the most iconic divas, such as Donna Summer, Cher and Diana Ross. I’ve always been inspired by disco, soul funk and dance, particularly the female voices that emerged during this time.” The same month, Jade discussed her inspiration behind the album with Sydney Morning Herald: "I was really excited about this musical I had seen in London, Motown: The Musical, I don't know how many times I went back to see it," she says. "I was so obsessed with the story of Diana Ross and I went away from it and listened to more of her music and loved it."

== Reception ==
Professional ratings
Review scores
Source	Rating
auspOp	3/5 stars
Renowned for Sound	2.5/5 stars

David from auspOp said, "On first listen, the album doesn’t throw in any surprises and comes across quite flat", adding that "on the majority of songs, things feel polished but a bit too mellow. That being said, when Samantha connects to a song and is given the ability to let loose, she hits a home run." David named "I Feel Love", "Hot Stuff" and original tracks "Roller Skates" and "Let Me Love You" as the best tracks on the album. Jeff Jenkins from Stack Magazine said, "The tracklist doesn't take too many chances... but Jade's voice – breezy and bright – is perfectly suited to the euphoric and exuberant sound. The album concludes with a couple of impressive originals." Haydon Benfield from Renowned for Sound said, "Over its fourteen tracks and forty-seven minutes, Best of My Love fails to do anything exciting and a bit more of an adventurous streak would have served Jade well."

== Track listing ==
No.	Title	Writer(s)	Length
1.	"Best of My Love"	Maurice White, Al McKay	3:23
2.	"Never Can Say Goodbye"	Clifton Davis	2:59
3.	"Upside Down"	Nile Rodgers, Bernard Edwards	2:54
4.	"Dancing Queen"	Benny Andersson, Björn Ulvaeus, Stig Anderson	3:39
5.	"How Deep Is Your Love"	Barry Gibb, Robin Gibb, Maurice Gibb	3:06
6.	"I'm Coming Out"	Bernard Edwards, Nile Rodgers	3:38
7.	"I Feel Love"	Donna Summer, Giorgio Moroder, Pete Bellotte	3:58
8.	"Take Me Home"	Michele Aller, Bob Esty	3:54
9.	"Hot Stuff"	Pete Bellotte, Harold Faltermeyer, Keith Forsey	3:02
10.	"We Are Family"	Bernard Edwards, Nile Rodgers	3:02
11.	"I Will Survive"	Freddie Perren, Dino Fekaris	4:04
12.	"Roller Skates"	Samuel Brennan, Tom Hollings, Kes Noel Ingoldsby (also called Kez Komara or Kes Komara and Kes Kamara), Sorana Pacura	3:44
13.	"Let Me Love You"	Anthony Egizii, David Musumeci	3:23
14.	"Best of My Love" (2018 remix)		2:55

== Charts ==
Chart (2018)	Peak position
Australian Albums (ARIA)	6

== Release history ==
Region	Date	Format	Label	Catalogue
Australia	20 April 2018	CD, digital download	Sony Music Australia	19075837752
