= Unfinished Business (Nathan Sykes album) =

Studio album by Nathan Sykes
- Released: 11 November 2016
- Recorded: 2014–16
- Genre: Pop; dance-pop; R&B; soul
- Length: 44:11
- Label: Global Entertainment; Def Jam
- Producer: LDN Noise; Riley Bell; Matthew Burnett; Harmony Samuels; Talay Riley; Nathan Sykes; Jin Choi; Martin Sjolie; The Rascals; Babyface; Antonio Dixon; Tim Woodcock; Dernst Emlie II; Sam Watters; Pretty Sister; Jarred K; AC Burrell; Kyle Townsend

Singles from Unfinished Business
- 1. "Kiss Me Quick" Released: 28 June 2015; 2. "Over and Over Again" Released: 18 October 2015; 3. "Give It Up" Released: 29 April 2016; 4. "Famous" Released: 30 September 2016; 5. "There's Only One of You" Released: 29 December 2016

Professional ratings
Review scores
Source	Rating
Renowned for Sound	3.5/5 stars
The Observer	2/5 stars
Digital Spy	3/5 stars

Unfinished Business is the debut studio album by English singer Nathan Sykes. It was released on 11 November 2016, by Global Entertainment and Def Jam Recordings. The album features two guest vocals from American singer Ariana Grande, and American rapper G-Eazy.

== Background ==
In 2014, the concept for the album came about when the British-based dance-pop band The Wanted began parted ways with each other on a hiatus, while Nathan himself decided that he wanted to pursue a solo career. In March 2015, Sykes debuted as a solo artist and released his first music video for the track, called "More Than You'll Ever Know" on his Vevo account. Sykes went on his first solo tour on 8 April 2015, which included six sold-out shows in the United Kingdom. Sykes announced via the app Periscope that the debut single from his album would be called "Kiss Me Quick". The single was released on 28 June 2015. On 21 May 2015, Sykes released a music video for his debut single, "Kiss Me Quick" on his Vevo account. The song peaked at number 14 on the UK Singles Chart.

In October 2015, Sykes announced that his second single from the album would be called "Over and Over Again". The music video for the song was released in the UK on 28 October 2015. It was released worldwide on 20 November 2015. In March 2016, it was announced that Sykes would support the girl group Little Mix on their Get Weird Tour. Sykes announced that his third single from the album would be called "Give It Up", and would be released on 13 May 2016. The music video for "Give It Up" was released on 27 April 2016, and was later banned from television after numerous scenes were deemed unsuitable for most audiences. On 26 July 2016, Sykes announced that his debut studio album would be called Unfinished Business, and would be released on 4 November 2016. However, on 12 October 2016, Sykes announced that the album would be released one week later than originally planned on 11 November 2016.

== Track listing ==
Unfinished Business – Standard edition
No.	Title	Writer(s)	Producer(s)	Length
1.	"Good Things Come to Those Who Wait"	Nathan Sykes; Iain Farquharson; Martin Sjolie	Sjolie	3:38
2.	"Kiss Me Quick"	Sykes; Lorne Tennant; Greg Bonnick; Hayden Chapman; Jin Choi	LDN Noise; Choi	3:07
3.	"Money"	Sykes; James Abrahart; Carmen Reece; Edgar "JV" Etienne; Harmony Samuels	Samuels	3:18
4.	"Freedom"	Sykes; Tennant; Bonnick; Chapman	LDN Noise	2:51
5.	"Twist"	Sykes; Talay Riley; Etienne; Samuels	Samuels; Riley	4:01
6.	"I Can't Be Mad"	Sykes; Reece; Kenny "Babyface" Edmonds; Khris Riddick-Tynes	Babyface; Antonio Dixon; The Rascals	4:07
7.	"There's Only One of You"	Sykes; Tim Woodcock	Woodcock	3:54
8.	"Famous"	Sykes; Reece; Major Finley; Etienne; Samuels	Samuels	4:10
9.	"Give It Up" (featuring G-Eazy)	Sykes; Luke James; Riley; Matthew Burnett; Riley Bell; Gerald Gillum	Bell; Burnett	3:27
10.	"More Than You'll Ever Know"	Sykes; Riley; Kurtis McKenzie; Jonathan Mills; Scribz Riley	Riley	3:25
11.	"Over and Over Again"	Sykes; Reece; Finley; Samuels	Samuels; Sykes	4:07
12.	"I'll Remember You"	Sykes; Abrahart; Courtney Harrell; Dernst Emile II	D'Mile	4:06
Total length:				44:11

Unfinished Business – Deluxe edition
No.	Title	Writer(s)	Producer(s)	Length
13.	"Tears in the Rain"	Sykes; Louis Biancaniello; Sam Watters	Watters	4:23
14.	"Over and Over Again" (featuring Ariana Grande)	Sykes; Reece; Finley; Samuels	Samuels; Sykes	4:06
15.	"Taken"	Diane Warren	Pretty Sister; Jarred K; AC Burrell; Kyle Townsend; LDN Noise	2:48
16.	"Burn Me Down"	Sykes; Al Sherrod Lambert; Finley; Etienne; Samuels	Samuels	3:59
Total length:				59:27

Unfinished Business – Vinyl Double LP
No.	Title	Writer(s)	Producer(s)	Length
13.	"I'd Rather Lose"	Sykes; Harrell; Emile II	D'Mile; Harrell	4:00

== Charts ==
Chart (2016)	Peak position
Scottish Albums (OCC)	19
UK Albums (OCC)	11
US Heatseekers Albums (Billboard)	2

== Certifications ==
Region	Certification	Certified units/sales
United Kingdom (BPI)	Silver	60,000^{^}
^{^} Shipments figures based on certification alone.
