= Give It Up (Nathan Sykes song) =

Single by Nathan Sykes featuring G-Eazy

from the album Unfinished Business
- Released: 29 April 2016
- Recorded: 2015
- Length: 3:25
- Label: Global Entertainment
- Songwriter(s): Teddy Riley; Nathan Sykes; Gerald Gillum; Talay Riley; Luke James; Matthew Burnett; Riley Bell
- Producer(s): Riley Bell; Matthew Burnett

Nathan Sykes singles chronology
| "Over and Over Again" (2015) | "Give It Up" (2016) | "Famous" (2016) |

G-Eazy singles chronology
| "Drifting" (2016) | "Give It Up" (2016) | "You & Me" (2016) |

"Give It Up" is a song by English singer Nathan Sykes, featuring vocals from American rapper G-Eazy. The song was released in the United Kingdom on 29 April 2016 as the third single from his debut studio album Unfinished Business (2016). The song peaked at number 56 on the UK Singles Chart.

== Music video ==
A music video to accompany the release of "Give It Up" was first released onto YouTube on 27 April 2016.

== Track listing ==
Digital download
| No. | Title | Length |
|---|---|---|
| 1. | "Give It Up" (featuring G-Eazy) | 3:25 |

Digital download – Remixes
| No. | Title | Length |
|---|---|---|
| 1. | "Give It Up" | 3:06 |
| 2. | "Give It Up" (featuring G-Eazy) (Jack Wins Radio Edit) | 3:45 |
| 3. | "Give It Up" (featuring G-Eazy) (Jack Wins Extended) | 5:51 |

== Charts ==
| Chart (2016) | Peak position |
|---|---|
| Scotland (OCC) | 32 |
| UK Singles (OCC) | 56 |
| UK Indie (Official Charts Company) | 4 |
| US Dance Club Songs (Billboard) | 39 |

== Release history ==
| Region | Date | Format | Label |
|---|---|---|---|
| United Kingdom | 29 April 2016 | Digital download | Global Entertainment |
