= Famous (Nathan Sykes song) =

Single by Nathan Sykes

from the album Unfinished Business
- Released: 30 September 2016
- Recorded: 2015
- Genre: Soul; pop
- Length: 4:10
- Label: Global Entertainment
- Songwriter(s): Nathan Sykes; Harmony Samuels; Major Johnson Finley; Carmen Reece; Edgar "JV" Etienne
- Producer(s): Harmony Samuels

Nathan Sykes singles chronology
"Give It Up" (2016)	"Famous" (2016)	"There's Only One of You" (2016)

Music video
- "Famous" on YouTube

"Famous" is a song by English singer Nathan Sykes. The song was released in the United Kingdom on 30 September 2016 as the fourth single from his debut studio album Unfinished Business (2016). The song peaked at number 28 on the UK Singles Chart. The song was written by Nathan Sykes, Harmony Samuels, Major Johnson Finley, Carmen Reece and Edgar "JV" Etienne.

== Background ==
Sykes told MTV that he wrote an emotional but very nice song about his breakup with fellow singer Ariana Grande. In another interview, Sykes admitted that he cried while writing the song.

== Music video ==
A music video to accompany the release of "Famous" was first released onto YouTube on 17 October 2016.

== Track listing ==
Digital download
No.	Title	Length
1.	"Famous"	4:10

Digital download – Remixes
No.	Title	Length
1.	"Famous" (7th Heaven Radio Edit)	3:56
2.	"Famous" (7th Heaven Remix)	6:56
3.	"Famous" (Elephante Remix)	3:27

== Charts ==
Chart (2016)	Peak position
Scotland (OCC)	10
UK Singles (OCC)	28

== Release history ==
Region	Date	Format	Label
United Kingdom	30 September 2016	Digital download	Global Entertainment
