= Step Up (soundtrack) =

Step Up (Original Soundtrack)

Soundtrack album by Various artists
- Released: August 8, 2006
- Recorded: 2005–2006
- Genres: Dance; hip hop; R&B
- Labels: Jive, Zomba
- Producers: Donovan "Vendetta" Bennett, Tony Bongiovi, Julian Bunetta, Bryan-Michael Cox, Buck Damon, Kendrick "WyldCard" Dean, Ron Fair, Theron Feemster, Jazze Pha, Wyclef Jean, Mitchell Leib, Jonathan McHugh, Gina Rene, Raphael Saadiq, Adam Shakman, Ryan Tedder, Pete Thea, Justin Trugman and Kahbran White

Singles from Step Up (Original Soundtrack)
- 1. "(When You Gonna) Give It Up to Me" Released: July 4, 2006; 2. "Get Up" Released: July 25, 2006; 3. "Say Goodbye" Released: August 8, 2006; 4. "Step Up" Released: November 3, 2006

Professional ratings
Review scores
Source	Rating
Allmusic	3.5/5 stars
Teentoday.co.uk	3/5 stars

Step Up (Original Soundtrack) is the film soundtrack for the film Step Up. It was released on August 8, 2006, on Jive Records and features new music from Mario, Drew Sidora, Ciara, Chamillionaire, Kelis, Chris Brown, Jamie Scott, Yung Joc and 3LW. The lead singles from the soundtrack are Sean Paul's "(When You Gonna) Give It Up to Me" featuring Keyshia Cole and Ciara's "Get Up" featuring Chamillionaire. Other tracks include Kelis' "80's Joint", Anthony Hamilton's "Dear Life", Youngbloodz's "I'mma Shine", and Petey Pablo's "Show Me the Money" and Dolla's "Feelin 'Myself". The title track is performed by newcomer Samantha Jade and produced by Wyclef Jean. The soundtrack was certified gold by the Recording Industry Association of America on May 3, 2007.

== Track listing ==
#	Title	Artist
1.	'Bout It	Yung Joc featuring 3LW
2.	Get Up	Ciara featuring Chamillionaire
3.	(When You Gonna) Give It Up to Me	Sean Paul featuring Keyshia Cole
4.	Show Me The Money	Petey Pablo
5.	80's Joint	Kelis
6.	Step Up	Samantha Jade
7.	Say Goodbye	Chris Brown
8.	Dear Life	Anthony Hamilton
9.	For The Love	Drew Sidora featuring Mario
10.	Ain't Cha	Clipse featuring Re-Up Gang and Rosco P. Coldchain
11.	I'mma Shine	YoungBloodZ
12.	Feel'in Myself	Dolla
13.	'Til The Dawn	Drew Sidora
14.	Lovely	Deep Side
15.	U Must Be	Gina Rene
16.	Made	Jamie Scott

== Charts ==
=== Weekly charts ===
Weekly chart performance for Step Up
Chart (2006–07)	Peak position
Australian Albums (ARIA)	54
Austrian Albums (Ö3 Austria)	65
Belgian Albums (Ultratop Flanders)	79
Canadian Albums (Billboard)	7
Dutch Albums (Album Top 100)	82
European Top 100 Albums (Billboard)	90
German Albums (Offizielle Top 100)	58
New Zealand Albums (RMNZ)	40
Polish Albums (ZPAV)	3
Swiss Albums (Schweizer Hitparade)	5
US Billboard 200	6
US Top R&B/Hip-Hop Albums (Billboard)	6
US Soundtrack Albums (Billboard)	1

=== Year-end charts ===
Year-end chart performance for Step Up
Chart (2006)	Position
Swiss Albums (Schweizer Hitparade)	53
US Soundtrack Albums (Billboard)	12

== Certifications ==
Region	Certification	Certified units/sales
United Kingdom (BPI)	Gold	100,000^{‡}
United States (RIAA)	Gold	500,000^{^}
^{^} Shipments figures based on certification alone.^{‡} Sales+streaming figures based on certification alone.

== Step Up (Samantha Jade song) ==
"Step Up"

Single by Samantha Jade

from the album Step Up (Original Soundtrack)
- Released: November 3, 2006
- Genre: Pop
- Length: 3:25
- Label: Jive
- Songwriter: Diane Warren
- Producer: Wyclef Jean

Samantha Jade singles chronology
"Step Up" (2006)	"Turn Around" (2007)

Music video
- "Step Up" on YouTube

"Step Up" is the debut single by Australian recording artist Samantha Jade, released on November 3, 2006, through Jive Records. It is the title track from the soundtrack album of the film, Step Up. The song was written by Diane Warren and was produced by Wyclef Jean.

=== Music video ===
The accompanying music video for "Step Up" premiered on YouTube on August 10, 2006. The video features scenes of Jade singing and dancing, and intercut scenes from the film.

=== Charts ===
In the United States, "Step Up" peaked at number 92 on the Billboard Pop 100 chart in 2006. In Australia, the song failed to enter the ARIA Singles Chart, but debuted and peaked at number 50 on the ARIA Digital Singles Chart dated February 12, 2007. The track did not chart in Australia due to digital sales not being added into the main chart until later in the year.

Chart (2006–07)	Peak position
ARIA Digital Singles Chart	50
Billboard Pop 100	92
