= Nine (Samantha Jade album) =

Studio album by Samantha Jade
- Released: 20 November 2015
- Genres: Pop; dance-pop
- Length: 38:34
- Label: Sony

Samantha Jade chronology
Samantha Jade (2012)	Nine (2015)	Best of My Love (2018)

Singles from Nine
- 1. "Shake That" Released: 17 July 2015; 2. "Always" Released: 26 February 2016

Nine is the second studio album by Australian singer Samantha Jade, released through Sony Music Australia on 20 November 2015. It is her first album of completely original material.

== Background ==
Nine has been in the works since Jade won The X Factor Australia in 2012, but experienced numerous delays – most notably the passing of her mother in 2014. In February 2014, Jade put her career on hold to care for her mother Jacqueline after she was diagnosed with an aggressive form of cancer.

After her mother passed four months later, Jade continued recording for the album, newly inspired by her recent experiences. On 18 November 2014, she released a new single, "Sweet Talk". It was originally intended to be the lead single from Nine, however after a moderate peak of number 38 on the ARIA Singles Chart, it did not make the final track list.

The album's title, and title track, Nine is a reference to the nine years between releasing her debut single, "Step Up", and finally achieving her goal of releasing her first album of original material. Jade further explains the meaning behind the title; “When I wrote ‘Nine’, I wanted to get a sense of positivity in even the darkest moments so it came with the reference of being on cloud 9 or a cat with nine lives. The number 9 has also always been important in our family, and our birth dates have some sort of connection with it too. The song is very organic in that sense and directly from my heart.”

== Release ==
Nine was released physically and digitally on 20 November 2015. The album's artwork, track list and official release date were revealed on 10 November 2015. It was made available for pre-order that same day with a new promotional single, "What You Want". "Born to Be Alive" was released as the album's second promotional single on 17 November 2015. "Only Just Begun" was released as the final promotional single on 10 July 2016 in support of a promotional club tour. It was also featured in a Home and Away promo. The song, "Armour", originally the b-side to "Shake That", was released as a stand-alone promotional single to digital retailers and streaming services on 14 August 2015.

=== Singles ===
"Shake That", featuring American rapper Pitbull, was released as the album's lead single on 17 July 2015. It peaked at number 32 on the ARIA Singles Chart. After announcing and releasing for pre-order the follow-up single "Always", originally intended for release on 6 November 2015, Jade changed course and decided to give "Shake That" a second promotional push, with a performance on The X Factor Australia on 10 November 2015.

"Always" was released as the second single on 26 February 2016. It was featured heavily in the on-air promotions for Jade's Home and Away episodes. A 90-second trailer premiered on 7 March 2016, integrating scenes from the music video with scenes from the show.

== Reception ==
Professional ratings
Review scores
Source	Rating
Renowned for Sound	2.5/5 stars

In Marcus Floyd's review for Renowned for Sound, Nine was described as following "the same pop formula most X Factor winners put out", which was thought to be "not necessarily a bad thing but it's predictable." Floyd described "Shake That" as "not bad but it could have been more", and that "upbeat tracks like "Born to Be Alive" and "Wait For It" would have made better singles, except they lack the higher-selling names." Summarising, Floyd stated that "while Nine isn't the best pop release ever put out, it's not the worst either. Pros are that Jade is still going strong after her win and these songs have meaning behind them, her angelic voice makes it an easier listen; cons are that fans may have been expecting a more powerful release, previous non-album singles demonstrated just how immense Jade's music could be. Fans may welcome Ninebwith open arms, but it may not win Samantha any new followers.

== Track listing ==
No.	Title	Writer(s)	Producer(s)	Length
1.	"Always"	Samantha Jade; Jon Levine; Carmen Reece	Jon Levine	3:01
2.	"Naked"	Jade; Anthony Egizii; David Musumeci	DNA	3:48
3.	"Wait for It"	Tiffany Fred; Mansur Zafr	Mansur Zafr	3:15
4.	"What You Want"	Jade; William Singe	MdL; Tom Meredith	3:34
5.	"Only Just Begun"	Jade; Egizii; Musumeci	DNA	3:58
6.	"Shake That" (featuring Pitbull)	Antonio Dixon; Kenny "Babyface" Edmonds; Khristopher Riddick-Tynes; Reece; Leon Thomas III; Jonathan Percy Starker Saxe; Armando Pérez	Babyface; Antonio Dixon; The Rascals	3:38
7.	"Show Me Love"	Hayley Aitken; Sebastian Lundberg; Johan Gustafson; Fredrik Häggstam; Carlos Battey; Steven Battey	Trinity Music	3:24
8.	"Let the Good Times Roll"	Zac Poor; Alan Kasirye; Alja Jackson; Rosina "Soaky" Russell; Ivan Berry	Alan Nglish; MdL; Tom Meredith	3:53
9.	"Castle"	Jade; Poor; Khaled Rohaim; Hayley Warner	Khaled Rohaim	3:30
10.	"Born to Be Alive"	Jade; Poor; David Delazyn; Chaz Mishan; Nikki Flores; Clarence Coffee	The Fliptones	3:16
11.	"Nine"	Jade; Poor; Beau Golden	MdL; Tom Meredith	3:17
Total length:				38:34

== Charts ==
Chart (2015)	Peak position
Australian Albums (ARIA)	11
Australian Artist Albums (ARIA)	2

== Release history ==
Region	Date	Format	Label	Catalogue
Australia	20 November 2015	CD, digital download	Sony Music Australia	88875150082
