= What You've Done to Me =

Single by Samantha Jade

from the album Samantha Jade
- Released: 20 November 2012
- Recorded: 2012
- Genre: Pop; dance
- Length: 3:29
- Label: Sony
- Songwriter(s): David Musumeci; Anthony Egizii; Tania Doko; Jörgen Elofsson
- Producer(s): DNA Songs

Samantha Jade singles chronology
| "Secret" (2009) | "What You've Done to Me" (2012) | "Firestarter" (2013) |

Music video
- "What You've Done to Me" on YouTube

"What You've Done to Me" is the winner's single by season four winner of The X Factor Australia, Samantha Jade. It was released digitally on 20 November 2012, as the lead single from her self-titled debut album. "What You've Done to Me" was written by David Musumeci, Anthony Egizii, Tania Doko and Jörgen Elofsson, and produced by Musumeci and Egizii under their stage name DNA Songs. It debuted at number one on the ARIA Singles Chart and was certified four times platinum by the Australian Recording Industry Association (ARIA), denoting sales of 280,000 copies. "What You've Done to Me" also reached number 40 on the South Korea Gaon International Digital Chart.

== Background and release ==
"What You've Done to Me" was written by David Musumeci, Anthony Egizii, Tania Doko and Jörgen Elofsson. It was produced by Musumeci and Egizii under their stage name DNA Songs. After winning The X Factor, "What You've Done to Me" was released for digital download on 20 November 2012, as Jade's winner's single. The song was released physically on 26 November 2012.

== Reception ==
A writer for Take 40 Australia described "What You've Done to Me" as, "a sassy power ballad worthy of Kelly Clarkson." After three days of release, the song debuted at number one on the ARIA Singles Chart dated 25 November 2012. It became the 100th song to debut atop the chart and the 28th number-one single by an Australian reality-singing-show contestant. "What You've Done to Me" was certified triple platinum by the Australian Recording Industry Association (ARIA) for sales of 210,000 copies.

For the week spanning from 16 to 22 December 2012, "What You've Done to Me" debuted and peaked at number 28 on the South Korea Gaon International Download Chart. This position on the download chart corresponded to the song's debut on the South Korea Gaon International Digital Chart at number 40. "What You've Done to Me" was nominated for Song of the Year at the 27th ARIA Music Awards.

== Live performances ==
Jade performed "What You've Done to Me" live for the first time during The X Factor grand final performance show on 19 November 2012. After her performance, Jade's mentor Guy Sebastian called the song a "radio smash". Jade performed the song again during the grand final decider show the following day, after she was announced as the winner.

== Usage in media ==
- The song is featured in the fourth episode of Ja'mie: Private School Girl.

== Track listing ==
CD single / digital download
| No. | Title | Length |
|---|---|---|
| 1. | "What You've Done to Me" | 3:29 |

== Charts and certification ==
=== Weekly charts ===
| Chart (2012) | Peak position |
|---|---|
| Australia (ARIA) | 1 |
| South Korea (Gaon International Digital) | 40 |
| South Korea (Gaon International Download) | 28 |

=== Certification ===
| Region | Certification | Certified units/sales |
|---|---|---|
| Australia (ARIA) | 4× Platinum | 280,000^{‡} |
^{‡} Sales+streaming figures based on certification alone.

=== Year-end charts ===
| Chart (2012) | Position |
|---|---|
| ARIA Singles Chart | 74 |
| Australian Artist Singles Chart | 8 |

| Chart (2013) | Position |
|---|---|
| Australian Artist Singles Chart | 19 |

== Release history ==
| Region | Date | Format | Label | Catalogue |
|---|---|---|---|---|
| Australia | 20 November 2012 | Digital download | Sony Music Australia | — |
| Australia | 26 November 2012 | CD single | Sony Music Australia | 88765438272 |

== See also ==
- List of number-one singles of 2012 (Australia)
