= Up! (Samantha Jade song) =

Single by Samantha Jade
- B-side: "Never Tear Us Apart"
- Released: 11 April 2014
- Recorded: Sydney
- Genre: Dance-pop
- Length: 3:27
- Label: Sony
- Songwriters: Samantha Jade; Zac Poor; Mario Marchetti
- Producer: Mario Marchetti

Samantha Jade singles chronology
"Soldier" (2013)	"Up!" (2014)	"Sweet Talk" (2014)

Music video
- "Up!" on YouTube

"Up!" (stylized as UP!) is a song recorded by Australian singer Samantha Jade. The song was digitally and physically released on 11 April 2014. "Up!" was written by Jade, Zac Poor and Mario Marchetti, and produced by Marchetti. It became her fifth top twenty hit since winning The X Factor Australia in 2012. On 12 March 2014, "Up!" was announced as the official Socceroos song for the 2014 FIFA World Cup. It was also used to promote the sixth season of X Factor Australia.

== Background and inspiration ==
On 11 March 2014, it was announced that Samantha Jade had written and recorded "Up!" as the official anthem of the Australian football team for the 2014 FIFA World Cup. "Up!" is an up-tempo, dance-pop song, co-written by Jade, Zac Poor and Mario Marchetti, with Marchetti serving as producer. Jade explained how the name of the song came about during writing sessions, saying: "When we were writing it we wanted something up-tempo and uplifting, so the word 'up' was the place to start." The track, which was recorded in Sydney, Australia in early 2014, drew inspiration from words in a book written by the players "documenting what it means to be a Socceroo." Jade described the recording as a "celebration-type record - it's about turning up the night and making the most out of things", feeling that it was a perfect song for the Socceroos.

== Release and reception ==
"Up!" was released as a digital download and CD single on 11 April 2014. The physical single contained Jades cover of "Never Tear Us Apart" by INXS as a b-side. "Up!" debuted at number eighteen on the Australian ARIA Singles Chart on 27 April 2014, and was the highest debut of the week. This is Jade's third single release from her upcoming album to peak within the top twenty of that chart. The recording also appeared on the ARIA Australian Artist Singles Chart, peaking at number six. Mike Wass of Idolator called it "an absolute party-starter".

== Promotion ==
=== Music video ===
The music video for "Up!" was directed by Lawrence Lim. Reviews of the video have been negative from fans and professionals alike. YouTube fans have said, "The video is so low budget that it's almost cringe worthy" and "This is a pathetic cheap video. Shame on Sony Australia!!!" while Take 40 Australia said, "For a song that is supposed to be the official Soccerros anthem for the 2014 FIFA World Cup in Brazil, the clip looks generic, boring and unauthentic – all things which Samantha Jade and 'Up!' are not!."

=== Socceroos Mix ===
A second video was released on 3 May, titled "The Socceroos Mix" and included clips of the Socceroos matches over the past decade to the original audio.

=== Live performances ===
Jade promoted "Up!" on television and radio, including Sunrise and on KIIS 106.5, respectively. Jade performed "Up!" on 26 May 2014 at ANZ Stadium during the Socceroos vs Qatar match.

== Track listing ==
Digital download
No.	Title	Length
1.	"Up!"	3:27

CD single
No.	Title	Length
1.	"Up!"	3:27
2.	"Never Tear Us Apart" (INXS cover)	3:38
Total length:		7:05

7th Heaven Club Mix digital download
No.	Title	Length
1.	"Up!" (7th Heaven Club Mix)	6:37

== Charts ==
=== Weekly chart ===
Chart (2014)	Peak position
Australia (ARIA)	18

=== Year-end chart ===
Chart (2014)	Rank
Australian Artist Singles Chart	35

== Certifications ==
Region	Certification	Certified units/sales
Australia (ARIA)	Gold	35,000^{^}
^{^} Shipments figures based on certification alone.

== Release history ==
Region	Date	Format	Label	Catalogue
Australia	11 April 2014	CD single	Sony Music Australia	88843056012
Australia	11 April 2014	Digital download	Sony Music Australia	—N/a
