= Love in Stereo (Carmen Reece album) =

Studio album by Carmen Reece
- Released: 6 August 2010 (iTunes); 1 September 2010 (Unplugged)
- Recorded: 2008–2010
- Genre: Pop, R&B, soul
- Length: 43:05
- Label: REAL MF Ltd
- Producer: Mark J. Feist

Alternative cover

Singles from Love in Stereo
- 1. "Right Here" Released: 26 October 2009; 2. "Raindrop" Released: 2 June 2010

Love in Stereo is the debut album by English-born singer-songwriter and musician Carmen Reece. It was released on 6 August 2010 in iTunes. Her other album, Unplugged, was released on 1 September 2010, containing covers of many artists' songs.

== Introduction ==
Carmen Reece was discovered by Mark J. Feist. Feist, signed her to his production company/Label REAL MF LTD, (independent) Mark J. Feist has sold 30 million records in his career and has produced and written for Beyoncé, Kelly Rowland & Celine Dion, To name a few.

== Credits ==
Carmen Reece and Mark J. Feist co-wrote the entire album with the exception of Right Here & Love in Stereo (Wayne Hector, Mark J. Feist, Carmen Reece) Raindrop, Be The One & Runnin' (Rose Marie Tan, Carmen Reece, Mark J. Feist) The album was recorded at Feist's Studio in Woodland Hills Ca. Except, Right Here which was written and recorded at Metropolis studios in London. Reece plays all piano parts on the album, whereas Feist played all other instruments. Feist also arranged and recorded every track. Carmen Reece performs all vocals (Background and leads). Feist mixed; Right Here, Don't Ever Leave Me, Love in Stereo, Runnin', Be The One, and Long Goodbye. Jon Gass mixed; Bullet Through My Heart and Raindrop. There are also re-mixes of "Right Here" by: Dave Audé, Jason Nevins, DJ Escape, And Mark J. Feist. Raindrop has remixes by: Dave Audé, Mark J. Feist & Jon Gass. The album was mastered by Bernie Grundman in Hollywood, CA.

== Singles ==
- "Right Here" was the first single, which made Billboard Chart history, Making Carmen Reece the only debut artist ever to climb from No. 12 and later No. 3 in two weeks on the Hot Top 40 Dance Airplay. It was released on 26 October 2009. It made to No. 10 in the Billboard Dance/Club Play Songs and No. 12 to No. 3 in Hot Dance Airplay.
- "Raindrop" is the second single to be released on 2 June 2010. It made to the Top 40/Pop Radio in May 2010.

== Track listing ==
All songs were produced & arranged by Mark J. Feist.

1. Be The One
2. Right Here
3. Bullet Through My Heart
4. Love in Stereo
5. Runnin'
6. Don't Ever Leave Me
7. Raindrop (Written by Reece, Feist and Rose Marie Tan)
8. Long Goodbye
9. Raindrop (Mark Feist/Jon Gass Extended)
10. Right Here (Dave Aude Radio)
11. Bullet Through My Heart (No Intro)

"Unplugged"
No.	Title	Lyrics	Music	Length
1.	"Mine"	Taylor Swift		3:54
2.	"Don't Ever Leave Me"			3:18
3.	"Be The One"			4:01
4.	"Right Here"			4:18
5.	"Runnin'"			4:39
6.	"DJ Got Us Fallin' in Love"	Max Martin, Shellback, Savan Kotecha, Armando C. Pérez		3:02
7.	"Raindrop"	Reece, Feist and Rose Marie Tan	Feist	3:32
8.	"U Smile"	Justin Bieber, Jerry Duplessis, Arden Altino, Dan August Rigo		3:02
9.	"Only Girl"	Crystal Johnson, Mikkel S. Eriksen, Tor Erik Hermansen, Sandy Wilhelm		4:19
10.	"Just the Way You Are"	Peter Hernandez, Philip Lawrence, Ari Levine, Khalil Walton, Khari Cain		3:13
Total length:				35:98
