= Nathan Sykes =

English singer (born 1993)

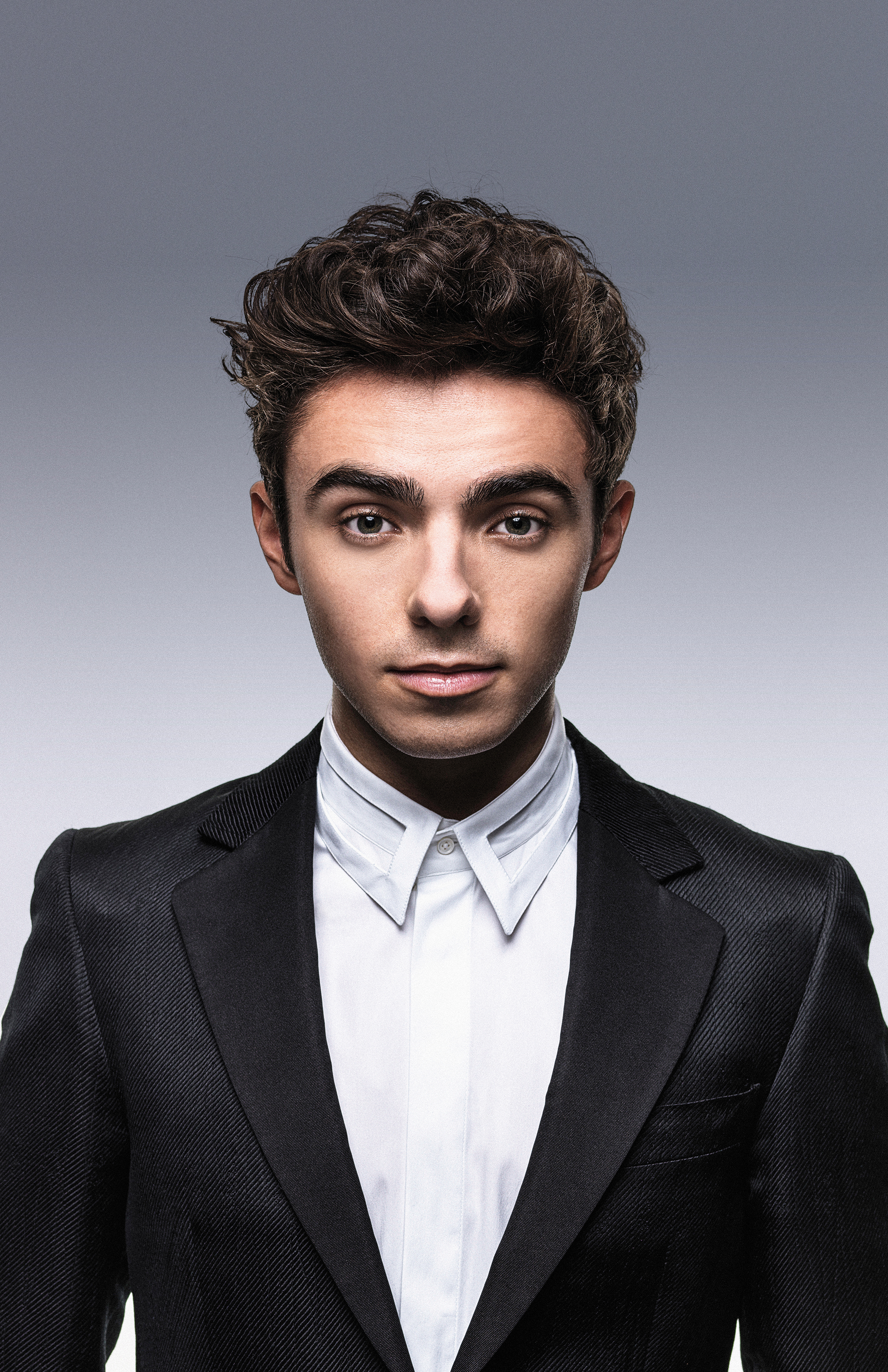
- Sykes in 2015
- Born: Nathan James Sykes; 18 April 1993 (age 33); Gloucester, Gloucestershire, England
- Occupation: Singer
- Years active: 2003–present
- Spouse: Charlotte Burke (m. 2025)
- Musical career
- Genres: Pop; R&B; soul
- Label: Global
- Member of: The Wanted
- Website: nathansykesofficial.com

Nathan James Sykes (born 18 April 1993) is an English singer, best known as a member of the boy band the Wanted. In 2013, Sykes appeared with his bandmates in the E! channel reality television series The Wanted Life. After the band's hiatus in 2014, Sykes embarked on a solo career. His debut single, "Kiss Me Quick" was released in July 2015. It reached number-one on the US Dance Club Songs chart.

== Early life ==
Sykes was born on 18 April 1993 in Gloucester to Harry and Karen Sykes, who is a music teacher. He has a younger sister, Jessica Sykes, who is also a singer.

He started singing and performing at the age of six and attended Sylvia Young Theatre School from the age of 11. After completing his GCSEs and graduating from Sylvia Young, he returned to Gloucester to attend sixth form at the selective Ribston Hall High School; however he did not complete his A-levels due to band commitments.

In 2002 and 2003, Sykes won various competitions, including Britney Spears Karaoke on The Saturday Show and one of the categories at the Cheltenham Competitive Festival of Dramatic Art. In 2004, he appeared on ITV's Ministry of Mayhem, and won the Door Youth Project's "Undiscovered Youth Talent Contest" where he performed "Mack the Knife" in Stroud, and he attempted to represent United Kingdom in the Junior Eurovision Song Contest 2004 that was held in Lillehammer. In the finals, he finished in third place with the song, "Born to Dance", behind Cory Spedding and runner-up Andrew Merry. In 2008, he performed for the music competition "Live and Unsigned".

== Career ==
=== 2009–2014: The Wanted ===
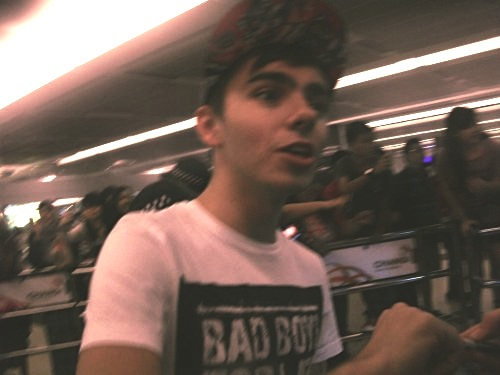
Sykes at Changi Airport, Singapore in 2010

In 2009, at the age of 16, Sykes auditioned for the boy band the Wanted. The auditions were held by Jayne Collins. Sykes was chosen to be one of those five members for a group. He joined bandmates Max George, Siva Kaneswaran, Tom Parker and Jay McGuiness. The band achieved 10 UK top 10 singles as well as 3 UK top 10 albums. The group has sold more than 12 million records worldwide.

After being on voice rest for almost a month, Sykes went in for surgery to remove a nodule in his throat on 18 April 2013. During episodes of The Wanted Life, he talked about his throat hurting and burning. The day manager had him see a specialist, who concluded he had a nodule on his throat and suggested that it be removed. The band announced that they would continue their promotional commitments without Sykes for the time being in order to allow him to recover from the surgery.

Sykes made his return in June 2013 when the Wanted opened the Capital FM Summertime Ball, during a performance of "I Found You". Following his return to the band, Sykes confirmed that he would be joining the rest of his bandmates for their upcoming summer gigs and events, while also stating that he still has some recovering to do. Speaking with Heart Radio for an interview, Sykes told the audience: "I'm not quite fully recovered yet but it's quite a long process. I'm at the stage where I can sing and get back with the lads, so I'm very excited to be back and I'm working very hard for a change." As part of the recovery process, it has been reported that Sykes still has to undergo speech and vocal therapy in order to sing with his full vocal range without causing any more damage to it.

After enjoying much mainstream international success, in 2014, the band decided to take a break and pursue their personal endeavours after a tour of the United Kingdom and the United States.

At the same time, Sykes and American singer Ariana Grande released their collaborative single, "Almost Is Never Enough". In 2014, Sykes signed a record deal with Global Entertainment (a part of the Global Group, along with Capital's owner Global Radio). In June 2014, he joined singer Jessie J onstage for Capital's Summertime Ball to perform "Calling All Hearts".

Sykes reunited with his bandmates on 20 September 2021, seven years since their hiatus in support of bandmate Tom Parker for his charity concert 'Tom Parker: Inside My Head' in aid of raising money for Stand Up to Cancer and The National Brain Appeal at the Royal Albert Hall.

The Wanted's first record since 2014, "Rule the World" was released 13 September 2021 to accompany their greatest hits record Most Wanted - The Greatest Hits, released on 12 November 2021.

=== 2015–present: Unfinished Business ===
On 21 June 2014, Sykes appeared solo as a special guest performer at the Capital FM Summertime Ball alongside Jessie J to perform "Calling All Hearts" with DJ Cassidy. This marked his first official solo performance since the band's hiatus and his fifth consecutive year as part of the Summertime Ball lineup. He is currently working on music for his debut solo album. Sykes plans to release his debut single in spring 2015, with his debut album being released towards the end of the year.

On 28 January 2015 MTV revealed that Sykes had played them previews of his upcoming material co-written with producers Harmony and LDN Noise including "Money", "Famous" and "Kiss Me Quick".

In March 2015, Sykes debuted his first solo music video for "More Than You'll Ever Know" on Vevo. Sykes went on his first solo tour "Intimate" on 8 April 2015, which included six sold-out shows in the United Kingdom. Sykes announced via the app Periscope that his debut single would be called "Kiss Me Quick", co-written with LDN Noise and Ali Tennant. The single was released on 5 July 2015. On 21 May 2015, Sykes released his music video for his debut single, "Kiss Me Quick" on Vevo. The song peaked at number 14 on the UK Singles Chart and number 19 on the Scottish Singles Chart. The song also reached the number 1 spot on the US Dance Club Songs chart.

In October 2015, Sykes announced his second single, called "Over and Over Again". The music video for the song was released in the UK on 28 October 2015. It was released worldwide on 20 November 2015. It was also announced that Sykes would support Little Mix on their The Get Weird Tour in March 2016. Sykes announced that his third single, called "Give It Up", would be released on 13 May 2016. The music video for "Give It Up" was released on 27 April 2016, and was later banned from television after featuring numerous scenes which came across as unsuitable for most audiences.

On 11 June 2016, Sykes performed at Capital's Summertime Ball for the seventh consecutive time (2010, 2011, 2012, 2013 with The Wanted, 2014 as Jessie J's guest, 2015 and 2016 as a solo performer).

On 11 July 2016, Sykes announced via Twitter that he would be joining Alessia Cara on her Know-It-All headlining tour in the United States. On 12 October 2016, Sykes announced via Twitter that his debut studio album, Unfinished Business, would be out worldwide on 11 November 2016.

During September 2021, the Wanted returned with all 5 members of the group, up until bandmate Tom Parker died in 2022.

=== 2025: Ultraviolet ===
On 17 October 2025, Sykes released his second studio album, Ultraviolet. The album later reached number 58 on the UK Albums Sales Chart.

== Personal life ==
In the summer of 2012, he dated Dionne Bromfield. He also dated Ariana Grande from August to December 2013.

In December 2022, Sykes announced his engagement to his long-term girlfriend, Charlotte Burke.

He was diagnosed with autism in 2024. He opened up about living with it in 2025.

== Filmography ==
Television
Year	Title	Role	Notes
2013	Chasing the Saturdays	Himself	Episode: "DeepFriedSats"
2013	The Wanted Life	Himself	

Film
Year	Title	Role
2007	The Magic Door	Elf Warrior

Theatre
Year	Title	Role	Venue
2026	Hadestown	Orpheus	Lyric Theatre, London

== Discography ==
=== Albums ===
Title	Details	Peak chart positions			Certifications
Title	Details	UK	SCO	US Heat.	Certifications
Unfinished Business	Released: 11 November 2016; Label: Global Entertainment; Formats: CD, digital download	11	19	2	BPI: Silver
Ultraviolet	Released: 17 October 2025; Label: Independent; Formats: CD, digital download	—	66	—	

=== Singles ===
Title	Year	Peak chart positions			Certifications	Album
Title	Year	UK	SCO	US Dance	Certifications	Album
"Kiss Me Quick"	2015	14	19	1		Unfinished Business
"Over and Over Again" (solo or featuring Ariana Grande)	2015	8	6	1	BPI: Silver	Unfinished Business
"Give It Up" (featuring G-Eazy)	2016	56	32	39		Unfinished Business
"Famous"	2016	28	10	—		Unfinished Business
"There's Only One of You"	2016	65	29	—		Unfinished Business
"Pieces of Me"	2025	—	—	—		Ultraviolet
"Getting Lost"	2025	—	—	—		Ultraviolet
"—" denotes releases that did not chart or were not released in that territory.

=== Promotional singles ===
Title	Year	Peak chart positions				Certifications	Album
Title	Year	UK	IRE	SCO	US	Certifications	Album
"Almost Is Never Enough" (with Ariana Grande)	2013	49	56	60	82	BPI: Silver	The Mortal Instruments: City of Bones and Yours Truly
"More Than You'll Ever Know"	2015	—	—	—	—		Unfinished Business
"Twist"	2016	—	—	—	—		Unfinished Business
"Have Yourself a Merry Little Christmas"	2016	—	—	—	—		Non-album single
"—" denotes releases that did not chart or were not released in that territory.

=== Music videos ===
Title	Year	Director
"Almost Is Never Enough"	2013	Nev Todorovic
"More Than You'll Ever Know"	2015	Thomas Bryant
"Kiss Me Quick"	2015	Emil Nava
"Over and Over Again"	2015	Frank Borin
"Give It Up"	2016	Thomas Bryant
"Famous"	2016	Ivanna Smyrnova
"There's Only One of You"	2016	Thomas Bryant
"Have Yourself a Merry Little Christmas"	2016	Unknown

== Tours ==
Headlining

- Nathan Sykes Live (2015)

Support

- The Get Weird Tour – Little Mix (2016)
- Know-It-All headlining tour – Alessia Cara (2016)

== See also ==
- List of artists who reached number one on the U.S. Dance Club Songs chart
