= Soldier (Samantha Jade song) =

Single by Samantha Jade
- Released: 15 November 2013
- Genre: Electropop
- Length: 3:22
- Label: Sony
- Songwriters: Samantha Jade; Anthony Egizii; David Musumeci
- Producer: DNA Songs

Samantha Jade singles chronology
| "Firestarter" (2013) | "Soldier" (2013) | "Up!" (2014) |

Music video
- "Soldier" on YouTube

"Soldier" is a song recorded by Australian singer Samantha Jade. The song was digitally and physically released on 15 November 2013. "Soldier" was written by Jade, David Musumeci and Anthony Egizii, and produced by Musumeci and Egizii under their stage name DNA Songs. It became her fourth top twenty hit since winning The X Factor Australia in 2012. "Soldier" was certified Gold by the Australian Recording Industry Association for selling over 35,000 copies.

== Background and production ==
"Soldier" was written by Jade with David Musumeci and Anthony Egizii, who also produced and mixed the song under their stage name DNA Songs. Jade spoke about "Soldier" in an interview with News.com.au, revealing that the track was inspired by the end of her seven-year relationship with Swedish music producer Christian Nilsson. "Soldier" was released physically on CD single and for digital download on 15 November 2013.

== Track listing ==
CD single / digital download
| No. | Title | Length |
|---|---|---|
| 1. | "Soldier" | 3:22 |

Other versions
| No. | Title | Length |
|---|---|---|
| 1. | "Soldier" (7th Heaven Radio Edit) | 4:00 |

== Charts ==
=== Weekly charts ===
| Chart (2013) | Peak position |
|---|---|
| Australia (ARIA) | 17 |
| South Korea (Gaon International) | 163 |

=== Year-end charts ===
| Chart (2013) | Position |
|---|---|
| Australian Artist Singles Chart | 24 |

== Certifications ==
| Region | Certification | Certified units/sales |
|---|---|---|
| Australia (ARIA) | Platinum | 70,000^{^} |
^{^} Shipments figures based on certification alone.

== Release history ==
| Region | Date | Format | Label | Catalogue |
|---|---|---|---|---|
| Australia | 15 November 2013 | CD single | Sony Music Australia | 88843003312 |
| Australia | 15 November 2013 | Digital download | Sony Music Australia | —N/a |
