= Firestarter (Samantha Jade song) =

Single by Samantha Jade

from the album Samantha Jade (Indonesian edition)
- Released: 28 June 2013
- Genre: Dance-pop
- Length: 3:17
- Label: Sony
- Songwriter(s): Samantha Jade; David Musumeci; Anthony Egizii
- Producer(s): DNA Songs

Samantha Jade singles chronology
"What You've Done to Me" (2012)	"Firestarter" (2013)	"Soldier" (2013)

Music video
- "Firestarter" on YouTube

"Firestarter" is a song recorded by Australian singer Samantha Jade. The song was digitally released on 28 June 2013. "Firestarter" was written by Jade, David Musumeci and Anthony Egizii, and produced by Musumeci and Egizii under their stage name DNA Songs. "Firestarter" debuted and peaked at number nine on the ARIA Singles Chart and was certified platinum for selling 70,000 copies. The track was promoted by performances on the first results show of season five of The X Factor Australia on 26 August 2013 and Sunrise on 28 June 2013. The accompanying music video was directed by Christopher Freyand. It won ARIA Award for Best Video at the ARIA Music Awards of 2013.

== Background and release ==
"Firestarter" was written by Samantha Jade and written/produced by David Musumeci and Anthony Egizii under their stage name DNA Songs. Jade has stated that Firestarter is about getting the party started and having fun.

"Firestarter" was made available for digital download and CD single on 28 June. An acoustic version of "Firestarter" was released to iTunes on 9 August. The preview of the song was used for fifth season of The X Factor promotion.

== Promotion ==
The video for the song was directed by Christopher Freyand and released on 13 July 2013. Jade performed "Firestarter" for the first time on Sunrise. Jade then performed "Firestarter" live on the first results show of season five of The X Factor Australia on 26 August 2013.

== Legacy ==
"Firestarter" has been described as a gay anthem, with Jade expressing her surprise and gratitude for her gay fanbase in 2019.

== Track listing ==
CD single / digital download
No.	Title	Length
1.	"Firestarter"	3:17

Acoustic version digital download
No.	Title	Length
1.	"Firestarter" (Acoustic Version)	4:03

Other versions
No.	Title	Length
1.	"Firestarter" (7th Heaven Radio Edit)	3:34
2.	"Firestarter" (7th Heaven Club Mix)	6:43

== Charts ==
=== Weekly charts ===
Weekly chart performance for "Firestarter"
Chart (2013–2014)	Peak position
Australia (ARIA)	9
Russia Airplay (TopHit)	4
South Korea (Gaon International Digital)	56
South Korea (Gaon International Download)	43
Ukraine Airplay (TopHit)	10

=== Year-end charts ===
2013 year-end chart performance for "Firestarter"
Chart (2013)	Position
Australian Artist Singles Chart	15
Russia Airplay (TopHit)	96

2014 year-end chart performance for "Firestarter"
Chart (2013)	Position
Russia Airplay (TopHit)	79

== Certification ==
Region	Certification	Certified units/sales
Australia (ARIA)	Platinum	70,000^{^}
^{^} Shipments figures based on certification alone.

== Release history ==
Region	Date	Format	Label	Catalogue
Australia	28 June 2013	CD single	Sony Music Australia	88883733912
Australia	28 June 2013	Digital download	Sony Music Australia	—
