= Shake That (Samantha Jade song) =

Single by Samantha Jade featuring Pitbull

from the album Nine
- B-side: "Armour"
- Released: 17 July 2015
- Recorded: 2015
- Genre: Pop; R&B
- Length: 3:39
- Label: Sony
- Songwriters: Antonio Dixon; Kenny "Babyface" Edmonds; Khristopher Riddick-Tynes; Carmen Reece; Leon Thomas III; Jonathan Percy Starker Saxe; Armando Pérez
- Producers: Babyface; Antonio Dixon; The Rascals

Samantha Jade singles chronology
"Start Again" (2015)	"Shake That" (2015)	"Always" (2016)

Pitbull singles chronology
"Baddest Girl in Town" (2015)	"Shake That" (2015)	"Only Love" (2015)

Music video
- "Shake That" on YouTube

"Shake That" is a song recorded by Australian singer Samantha Jade featuring American rapper Pitbull. "Shake That" was written by Antonio Dixon, Kenny "Babyface" Edmonds, Khristopher Riddick-Tynes, Carmen Reece, Leon Thomas III, Jonathan Percy Starker Saxe and Armando Pérez, and produced by Babyface, Antonio Dixon and The Rascals. It was released on 17 July 2015, as the lead single from Jade's second studio album, Nine, and debuted at number thirty-two on the Australian ARIA singles chart. The song's accompanying music video was released on the same day via YouTube and Vevo.

== Background and promotion ==
"Shake That" was recorded and mixed in Los Angeles in January 2015. According to Jade, she "heard it at the studio while we were writing something else and I was like, 'We need to pause on this song and I need to record this right now!' It just had this great feel and message, so we got straight to it and now it's my single!" Pitbull was added months later when Jade felt that the song was missing a bridge. She felt that "Pitbull was perfect because of the track feeling like a real 'him' sort of song. So we sent it out and hoped to god that he'd say 'yes' and he did." He later recorded the bridge in Miami. Jade's first TV performance of the song was on 26 July 2015, on Australia's Dancing with the Stars. On 30 July 2015, she performed the song on Australian morning shows, Sunrise and The Morning Show. It peaked at number 32 on the ARIA Singles Chart.

After announcing and releasing for pre-order the follow-up single "Always", originally intended for release on 6 November 2015, Jade changed course and decided to give "Shake That" a second promotional push, with a performance on The X Factor Australia on 10 November 2015. The performance managed to send the song to a new peak of #19 on the iTunes Singles Chart, however it failed to reach a new peak on the ARIA Singles Chart, re-entering at #69. Jade performed the song again on The Morning Show on 20 November 2015, the day that Nine was released.

== Music video ==
The official music video for "Shake That" was released on the same day as the song via YouTube and Vevo. It was directed by filmmaker and actress Gracie Otto. Jade's scenes were shot in a luxury home on Sydney's north shore, where she had done a Marie Claire shoot only weeks beforehand, while Pitbull filmed his scenes in Miami. It is a beauty video in which Jade poses and dances seductively in a variety of glamorous outfits while Pitbull looks on.

== Track listing ==
Digital download
No.	Title	Length
1.	"Shake That" (featuring Pitbull)	3:39

CD single
No.	Title	Length
1.	"Shake That" (featuring Pitbull)	3:39
2.	"Armour"	3:15
Total length:		6:54

== Personnel ==
Credits adapted from Discogs.

- Samantha Jade: lead vocals, writer
- Armando Perez (Pitbull): featured artist, writer
- Kenny "Babyface" Edmonds: writer, producer
- Antonio Dixon: writer, producer
- The Rascals: producers
- Carmen Reece: writer, vocal producer, background vocals
- Khristopher Riddick-Tynes: writer
- Jonathan Percy Starker Saxe: writer
- Leon Thomas III: writer
- Randy Ellis: alto saxophone
- Garrett Smith: trombone
- Andrew Carney, Chris Bautista: trumpet
- Paul Boutin: recording, mixing
- Tom Coyne: mastering

== Charts ==
Chart (2015)	Peak position
Australia (ARIA)	32

== Release history ==
Region	Date	Format	Label	Catalogue
Australia	17 July 2015	CD single	Sony Music Australia	88875092082
Australia	17 July 2015	Digital download	Sony Music Australia	—N/a
