= Always (Samantha Jade song) =

Single by Samantha Jade

from the album Nine
- Released: 26 February 2016
- Recorded: 2015
- Genre: Pop
- Length: 3:01
- Label: Sony
- Songwriters: Samantha Jade; Jon Levine; Carmen Reece
- Producer: Jon Levine

Samantha Jade singles chronology
"Shake That" (2015)	"Always" (2016)	"Hurt Anymore" (2016)

Music video
- "Always" on YouTube

"Always" is a song by Australian recording artist, Samantha Jade. The song was written by Samantha Jade, Jon Levine & Carmen Reece. It was released as the second single from Nine on 26 February 2016. The song's accompanying music video was released on 3 March 2016.

== Background and release ==
"Always" was the final track written for Nine. Jade describes it as being "about finding that person, your one, the one you keep falling in love with" and as one of the album's "very fun pop songs that make you feel like letting go and enjoying the good times".

The song was originally scheduled for release as a single on 6 November 2015. It was announced and released for pre-order on 6 October 2015, however Jade changed course and decided to give previous single "Shake That" a second promotional push and "give the album its moment as well."

On 10 February 2016, Jade re-announced "Always" as her next single, for release on 26 February 2016. On 14 February 2016, Jade launched an "Always" Valentine's Day promotion through Tweematic, an online "photo booth" where fans could take a picture with her to share on social media.

A "stream to unlock" promotion was unveiled on 17 February 2016, where a behind-the-scenes look at the music video would be unlocked after reaching a certain amount of streams on Spotify.

"Always" features heavily in the on-air promotions for Jade's Home and Away episodes. A 90-second trailer premiered on 7 March 2016, integrating scenes from the music video with scenes from the show.

== Music video ==
The official music video for "Always" premiered on 3 March 2016 on Yahoo7, and was released on Vevo the following day. It features Jade's Home and Away co-star, Nic Westaway, as her love interest.

== Live performances ==
On 5 March 2016, Jade performed "Always" for the first time on television at the Weekend Sunrise Parathon. On 8 March 2016 she performed the single on Sunrise. "Always" was also performed on The Morning Show on 16 March 2016.

== Track listing ==
- CD single
1. "Always" – 3:01
2. "Always" (Instrumental) – 3:01

== Charts ==
Chart (2016)	Peak position
Australia (ARIA)	28
Australian Artist Singles (ARIA)	4

== Release history ==
Region	Date	Format	Label	Catalogue
Australia	26 February 2016	Sony Music Australia	CD single	88875163082
