= Bounce (Samantha Jade song) =

Single by Samantha Jade
- Released: 20 September 2019
- Length: 2:44
- Label: Sony
- Songwriters: Samantha Jade; G'harah "PK" Degeddingseze; Carmen Reece

Samantha Jade singles chronology
"Roller Skates" (2018)	"Bounce" (2019)	"In the Morning" (2020)

Music video
- "Bounce" on YouTube

"Bounce" is a song by Australian singer Samantha Jade. It was originally released as the first single from her fifth studio album on 20 September 2019, However the album was scrapped when Jade left Sony Music Australia in 2022. The song was co-written by Jade.

== Background ==
In an interview with the Star Observer, Jade explained that "Bounce" "not only focuses on the spring step that comes from being loved but also centres on the personal growth that comes from loving another. [...] Basically, it's a song about love. But it's about that person you meet that puts a bounce in your step and makes you want to be better, and as it says in the bridge 'love harder' and do better, and just be a better person. I think that's a very different love [compared] to that kind of obsessive love. It's a better love." She has described the song as "R&B pop and it feels very natural for me. It's a return to my roots with the music I started doing when I was 17."

== Promotion ==
To promote the single, Jade was announced to perform at the final of the ninth season of Australia's Got Talent on 22 September 2019.

== Music video ==
The music video for "Bounce" premiered on YouTube on 11 October 2019, and features Jade with dancers in yellow outfits against a yellow backdrop, alternated with pink outfits and a pink backdrop.

== Reception ==
On 26 September 2019, The Music Network confirmed that "Bounce" was the most added song to Australian radio for that week.

== Track listing ==
Digital download
No.	Title	Length
1.	"Bounce"	2:44

CD single
No.	Title	Length
1.	"Bounce"	2:44
2.	"Bounce" (feat. City Girls)	3:08
3.	"Bounce" (Acapella)	2:46
Total length:		8:41

Bounce (The Remixes)
No.	Title	Length
1.	"Bounce" (7th Heaven Remix)	2:58
2.	"Bounce" (Bombs Away Remix)	2:59
Total length:		5:57

== Charts ==
Chart (2019)	Peak position
Australia Digital Tracks (ARIA)	29
Australian Artist Singles (ARIA)	17

== Release history ==
Country	Date	Format	Label	Catalogue
Australia	20 September 2019	Digital download; streaming	Sony Music Australia	—N/a
Australia	1 November 2019	CD single	Sony Music Australia	19075995462
Australia	13 December 2019	Remixes	Sony Music Australia	—N/a
