= Samantha Jade (album) =

Studio album by Samantha Jade
- Released: 7 December 2012
- Recorded: 2012
- Genres: Pop, dance-pop
- Length: 38:16
- Label: Sony
- Producers: DNA Songs, Dorian West

Samantha Jade chronology
Samantha Jade (2012)	Nine (2015)

Singles from Samantha Jade
- 1. "What You've Done to Me" Released: 20 November 2012

Samantha Jade is the self-titled debut studio album by Samantha Jade, the 2012 winner of The X Factor Australia, released through Sony Music Australia on 7 December 2012. The album's lead single "What You've Done to Me" preceded the album's release.

== Background ==
In 2006, Jade recorded the title track "Step Up" for the 2006 Universal Pictures dance drama film Step Up, which was produced by rapper and music producer Wyclef Jean. The single, which had little promotion, appeared for one week on the Billboard Pop 100 peaking at number 92. In 2007 Jade released her follow-up single "Turn Around" which underperformed. Jade began recording her debut album My Name is Samantha Jade with producers Darkchild, Timbaland, Max Martin, and Stargate. According to Apple, the album suffered numerous setbacks and was not released. In 2007, Jade co-wrote and sang backup vocals on the track "Positivity" on Ashley Tisdale's debut album Headstrong.

Jade was later dropped from Jive Records and attempted to continue to work on music independently with American record label Affinity West Entertainment. That same year Jade made her acting debut in the film Beneath the Blue, a sequel to Eye of the Dolphin. The film was released in 2009. Jade recorded a track the following year with David Guetta and Laidback Luke for David Guetta's fourth studio album One Love which was released in August. The track did not make the final track listing but is featured as a bonus track on certain international releases. In July 2009, Jade released her third single, "Secret," in Australia, which failed to chart. The official music video for the single was directed by Valerie Babayan. In August 2009, Jade performed on Kerri-Anne to promote the single. In November 2011, Jade returned to her home city of Perth in Australia and began working at her father's mining factory, counting stock.

Samantha Jade features re-recorded studio tracks of some of Jade's performances during the live shows on The X Factor Australia, as well as her winner's single, "What You've Done to Me".

== Release ==
Samantha Jade was released by Sony Music Australia on 7 December 2012, as both digital download and CD formats. The Indonesian edition was released with 2 bonus tracks in CD format.

=== Singles ===
Following Jade's win on the fourth season of The X Factor Australia on 20 November 2012, her winner's single "What You've Done to Me" was released for digital download, and served as the lead single from the album.

== Track listing ==
No.	Title	Writer(s)	Producer(s)	Length
1.	"What You've Done to Me"	David Musumeci; Anthony Egizii; Tania Doko; Jörgen Elofsson	DNA	3:29
2.	"Heartless"	Kanye West; Ernest Wilson; Scott Mescudi; Malik Jones	Dorian West	3:15
3.	"Wide Awake"	Katy Perry; Bonnie McKee; Lukasz Gottwald; Max Martin; Henry Walter	Dorian West	3:43
4.	"Free Fallin'"	Amy Pearson	Dorian West	3:26
5.	"Everytime"	Britney Spears; Annette Stamatelatos	Dorian West	3:24
6.	"Run to You"	Jud Freidman; Allan Rich	Dorian West	3:14
7.	"Scream"	Martin; Shellback; Savan Kotecha; Usher Raymond	Dorian West	3:21
8.	"UFO"	Angus McDonald; Connie Mitchell	Dorian West	3:48
9.	"Stronger (What Doesn't Kill You)"	Elofsson; Ali Tamposi; David Gamson; Greg Kurstin	Dorian West	3:14
10.	"Where Have You Been"	Ester Dean; Gottwald; Calvin Harris; Geoff Mack	Dorian West	4:02
11.	"Breakeven"	Andrew Frampton; Danny O'Donoghue; Mark Sheehan; Steve Kipner	Dorian West	3:25
Total length:				38:16

Indonesian edition
No.	Title	Writer(s)	Producer(s)	Length
12.	"Firestarter"	Samantha Jade Gibbs; Musumeci; Egizii	DNA	3:17

== Charts ==
=== Weekly chart ===
Chart (2012)	Peak position
Australian Albums (ARIA)	3

=== Year-end chart ===
Chart (2012)	Position
Australian Albums Chart	59
Australian Artist Albums Chart	16

== Certifications ==
Region	Certification	Certified units/sales
Australia (ARIA)	Gold	35,000^{^}
^{^} Shipments figures based on certification alone.

== Release history ==
Region	Date	Format	Label
Australia	7 December 2012	CD, digital download	Sony Music Australia
