= Sweet Talk (Samantha Jade song) =

Single by Samantha Jade
- Released: 18 November 2014
- Recorded: 2014
- Genre: Bubblegum pop; disco
- Length: 3:32
- Label: Sony
- Songwriters: Charli Taft; Brian Lee; Andrew Bolooki
- Producers: Paro; Brian Lee

Samantha Jade singles chronology
| "Up!" (2014) | "Sweet Talk" (2014) | "Start Again" (2015) |

Music video
- "Sweet Talk" on YouTube

"Sweet Talk" is a song recorded by Australian singer Samantha Jade. "Sweet Talk" was written by Charli Taft, Brian Lee and Andrew Bolooki, and produced by Paro, with co-production from Brian Lee. It was first released on 18 November 2014, and subsequently debuted at number thirty-eight on the Australian ARIA singles chart. The song's accompanying music video was released on 21 November 2014 via YouTube, alongside its physical CD single release.

== Background and promotion ==
A month after her mother's death, Jade, accompanied by her father and brothers embarked on an international trip ending in London, where Jade recorded "Sweet Talk".

Following the release of the single, Jade embarked on a regional tour to promote "Sweet Talk", consisting of a three-date Victoria tour, Albury's QEII Square on Friday and Victoria Park Lake in Shepparton.

== Critical reception ==
Professional ratings
Review scores
| Source | Rating |
|---|---|
| FDRMX | 3.8/5 stars |

Marcel Jeremiah of FDRMX gave a positive review on the song, citing the production to be similar to Dr. Luke hits, also saying "Even though “Sweet Talk” sounds like a summer anthem, maybe it can add a little sunshine to the freezing December weather".

== Track listing ==
Digital download
| No. | Title | Length |
|---|---|---|
| 1. | "Sweet Talk" | 3:32 |

CD single
| No. | Title | Length |
|---|---|---|
| 1. | "Sweet Talk" | 3:32 |
| 2. | "Sweet Talk" (7th Heaven Radio Edit) | 4:00 |
| Total length: | | 7:32 |

== Charts ==
| Chart (2014) | Peak position |
|---|---|
| Australia (ARIA) | 38 |

== Cover versions ==
- The song was sampled by DJ artist Discandy on the track called "Tasty Carrots" which is featured on the video-sharing social networking service TikTok.

== Release history ==
| Region | Date | Format | Label | Catalogue |
|---|---|---|---|---|
| Australia | 18 November 2014 | Digital download | Sony Music Australia | —N/a |
| Australia | 21 November 2014 | CD single | Sony Music Australia | 88875045622 |
