= Samantha Jade =

Australian singer, songwriter and actress (born 1987)

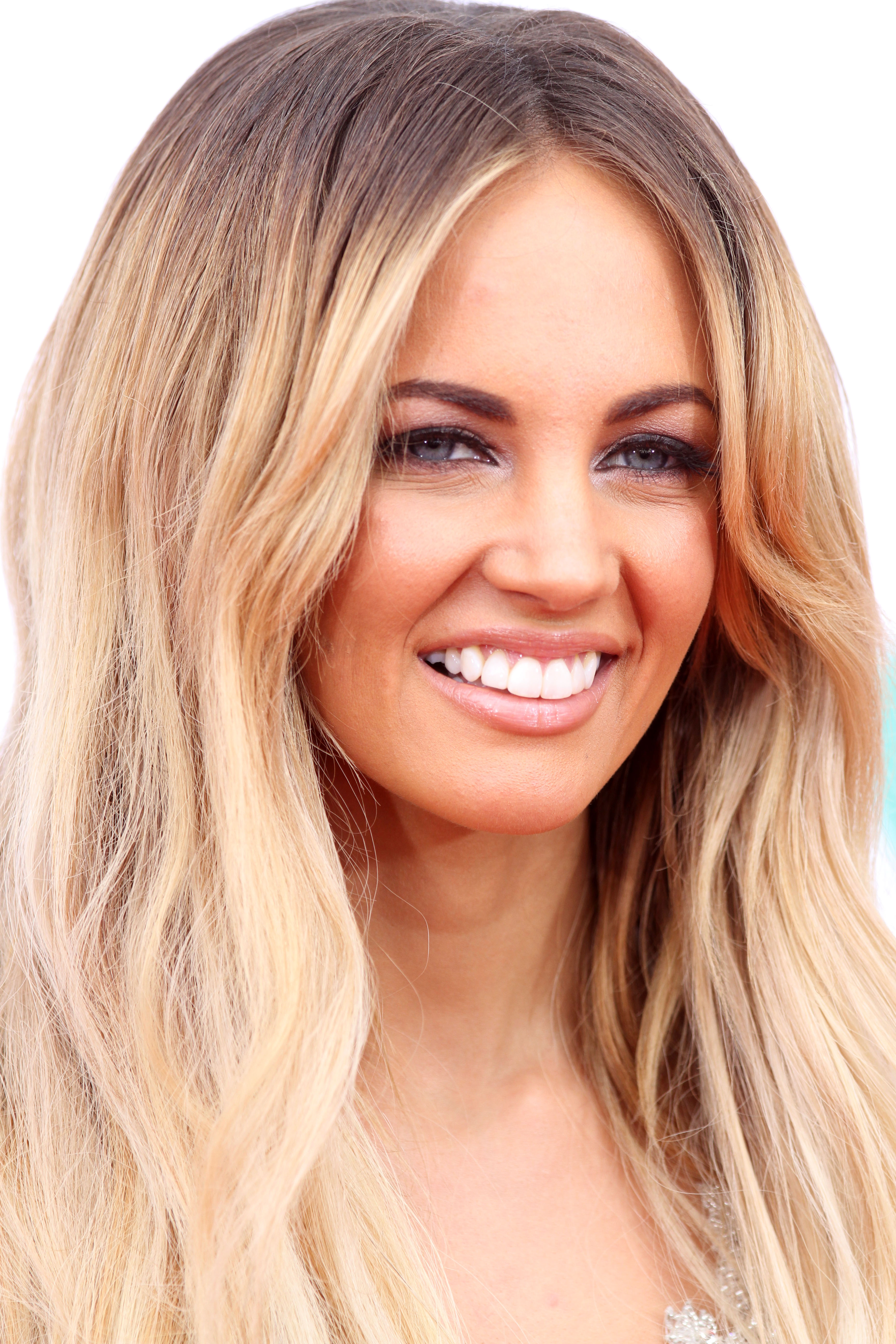
- Jade at the 2014 ARIA Music Awards

Background information
- Born: Samantha Jade Gibbs; 18 April 1987 (age 39); Perth, Western Australia, Australia
- Genres: Pop; electropop; dance-pop; electronic; disco; soul; R&B
- Occupations: Singer; songwriter; actress
- Years active: 2002–present
- Labels: Jive; Sony
- Website: samanthajadeofficial.com

Samantha Jade Gibbs (born 18 April 1987) is an Australian singer, songwriter and actress. She has written tracks for artists including JoJo and Ashley Tisdale. In 2012, Jade won the fourth season of The X Factor Australia, the first woman to win the Australian series. She subsequently signed with Sony Music Australia and released her winner's single "What You've Done to Me", which debuted at number one on the Australian Recording Industry Association (ARIA) Singles Chart. On 16 August 2024, Jade released her new EP, Love.Sick. Vol 2, debuting at #5 on the Australian iTunes Album Charts.

== Early life ==
Samantha Jade Gibbs was born in Perth, Western Australia. Her father, Kevin Gibbs, is of Anglo-Indian descent, while her mother, Jacqueline Deans Gibbs, is of Scottish descent. Her mother died on 8 June 2014 after a short battle with cancer. Jade began modeling at the age of four and at age nine she won a talent show after singing "Amazing Grace". She attended Good Shepherd Catholic Primary School in Kiara and Hampton Senior High School in Morley.

== Career ==
=== 2002–2010: Beginnings ===
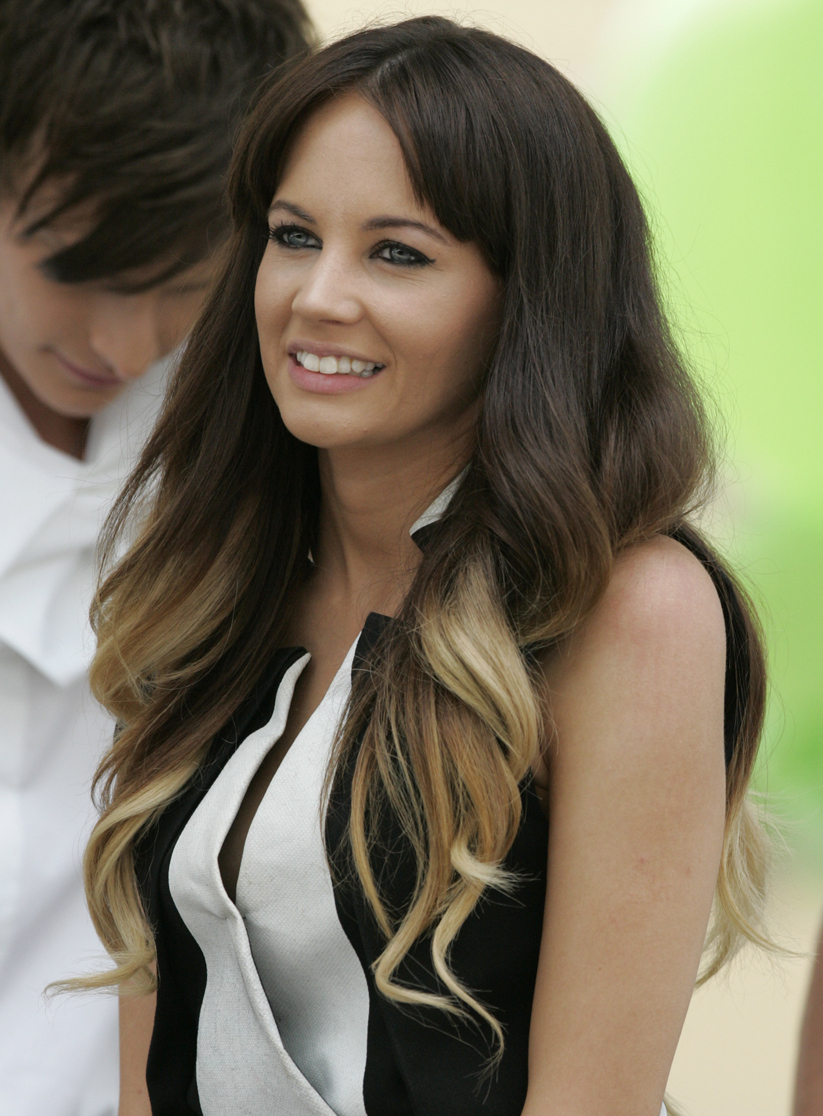
Jade at the Sony Foundation Youth Cancer Campaign

In 2002, Jade's friend sent her demo to a record producer in Los Angeles, California, United States who then decided to send Jade and her family to Hollywood for a meeting. The following year, they moved to Los Angeles. In 2004, she signed with US record label Jive Records and began recording a few demo tracks. That year, a song she co-wrote, "Secret Love", was recorded by JoJo for the soundtrack of the 2004 film Shark Tale.

In 2006, Jade recorded the title track "Step Up" for the 2006 dance film Step Up. The song was written by Diane Warren and produced by rapper Wyclef Jean. The single which had little promotion appeared for one week on the Billboard Pop 100 peaking at number 92. In 2007, Jade released her follow-up single "Turn Around". It was sent to mainstream radio in the United States on 14 August 2007, as the lead single from Jade's debut album, My Name is Samantha Jade. Upon initial release, "Turn Around" debuted and peaked at number 83 on the ARIA Singles Chart, but upon Jade winning the fourth season of The X Factor in 2012, the song re-entered and peaked at number 53. After three years with the label, My Name is Samantha Jade was never released. In 2007 Jade co-wrote and sang back-up vocals on the track "Positivity" on Ashley Tisdale's debut album Headstrong. The following year, Jade co-wrote and sang back-up vocals on the song "Can't Walk Away" on Tiffany Evans' album Tiffany Evans.

Jade was later dropped from Jive Records and attempted to continue to work on music independently with American record label Affinity West Entertainment. Jade recorded the controversial Golden Touch album for the label which would later result in issues regarding the release of the album, as it wasn't released until 2012. In 2010, Jade made her acting debut in the film Beneath the Blue, a sequel to Eye of the Dolphin. The film was released in 2009. Jade notably recorded a track the following year with David Guetta and Laidback Luke for David Guetta's fourth studio album One Love which was released in August. The track did not make the final track listing but is featured as a bonus track on certain international releases. In July 2009, Jade released her third single, "Secret", in Australia, which failed to chart. The official music video for the single was directed by Valerie Babayan. The video for "Secret" shows her narrowing down an old lover so she can confront them about their "Secret". In 2010, Jade returned to Perth and began working at her father's mining factory counting stock.

=== 2012: The X Factor Australia and Samantha Jade ===
"I was so overwhelmed and things had changed so much in my life – and things are still changing every day. I'm just grateful to be where I am right now and I feel like the luckiest girl in the world. I'm living the dream, literally, and working really hard to do my best for everyone that supported me through it all. I'm back to being me again, which is really nice. The show really brought me back to life. It's nice to be back in a good place again,"

— Jade speaking about her time on The X Factor.

In a final attempt to return to the music industry, Jade successfully auditioned for the fourth season of The X Factor in 2012, singing The Script's "Breakeven", during which judge Guy Sebastian notably teared up. Jade progressed to the super boot camp stage of the competition, where she sang "It Ain't Over 'til It's Over" by Lenny Kravitz and "No Air" by Jordin Sparks. She then advanced to the home visits round as part of the Over 25s category, which was mentored by Sebastian. He later selected Jade, along with Justin Standley and Nathaniel Willemse, for the live finals—a series of ten weekly live shows in which contestants are progressively eliminated by public vote.

For the first live performance show on 17 September 2012, she sang Katy Perry's "Wide Awake" and received praise from all four judges. Ronan Keating said "I'm going to get in trouble for saying this but that was better than Katy Perry", while Sebastian added that "Every singer in the country just literally went 'Oh my gosh'." However, Jade fell into the bottom two alongside Adil Memon but was saved after Keating, Natalie Bassingthwaighte, and Sebastian all opted to eliminate Memon. In the fifth week, Jade fell into the bottom two alongside Angel Tupai. After they received two votes each, the result went to deadlock and reverted to the earlier public vote leading to Tupai receiving the fewest votes and being eliminated. In the seventh week, Jade fell into the bottom two alongside Willemse but was advanced to the quarter-finals via deadlock.

In the semi-finals of the competition, Jade sang "Heartless" and "Where Have You Been", she advanced to the finals. During the grand final decider, on 20 November 2012, Jade was announced as the winner. She received a recording contract with record label Sony Music Australia and a Nissan Dualis car.

denotes having entered the ARIA Singles Chart. denotes having been in the bottom two. denotes winner.

Show	Theme	Song choice	Original artist	Order	Result
Auditions	Free choice	"Breakeven"	The Script	N/A	Through to super bootcamp
Super bootcamp	Free choice	"No Air"	Jordin Sparks	N/A	Through to home visits
Home Visits	Free choice	"Bleeding Love"	Leona Lewis	N/A	Through to live shows
Week 1	Judges' Choice	"Wide Awake"	Katy Perry	7	Bottom two (11th)
Week 1	Final Showdown	"Without You"	Mariah Carey	2	Saved
Week 2	Party All Night	"Freefallin"	Zoë Badwi	9	Safe (1st)
Week 3	Top 10 Hits	"Everytime"	Britney Spears	5	Safe (1st)
Week 4	Legends	"Run to You"	Whitney Houston	4	Safe (1st)
Week 5	1980s	"You Can't Hurry Love"	The Supremes	6	Bottom two (7th)
Week 5	Final Showdown	"I Will Be"	Avril Lavigne/Leona Lewis	2	Saved via deadlock
Week 6	Latest and Greatest	"Scream"	Usher	7	Safe (1st)
Week 7	Made in Australia	"UFO"	Sneaky Sound System	1	Bottom two (5th)
Week 7	Final Showdown	"At Last"	Etta James	1	Saved via deadlock
Quarter-Final	Judges' Challenge	"Stronger (What Doesn't Kill You)"	Kelly Clarkson	3	Safe (2nd)
Semi-Final	Power and Passion	"Heartless"	Kanye West	2	Safe (1st)
Semi-Final	Power and Passion	"Where Have You Been"	Rihanna	6	Safe (1st)
Final	Audition song	"Breakeven"	The Script	3	Safe (1st)
Final	Last shot song	"Take a Bow"	Rihanna	7	Safe (1st)
Final	Song of the series	"Scream"	Usher	5	Safe (1st)
Final	Winner's single	"What You've Done to Me"	Jade	1	Winner

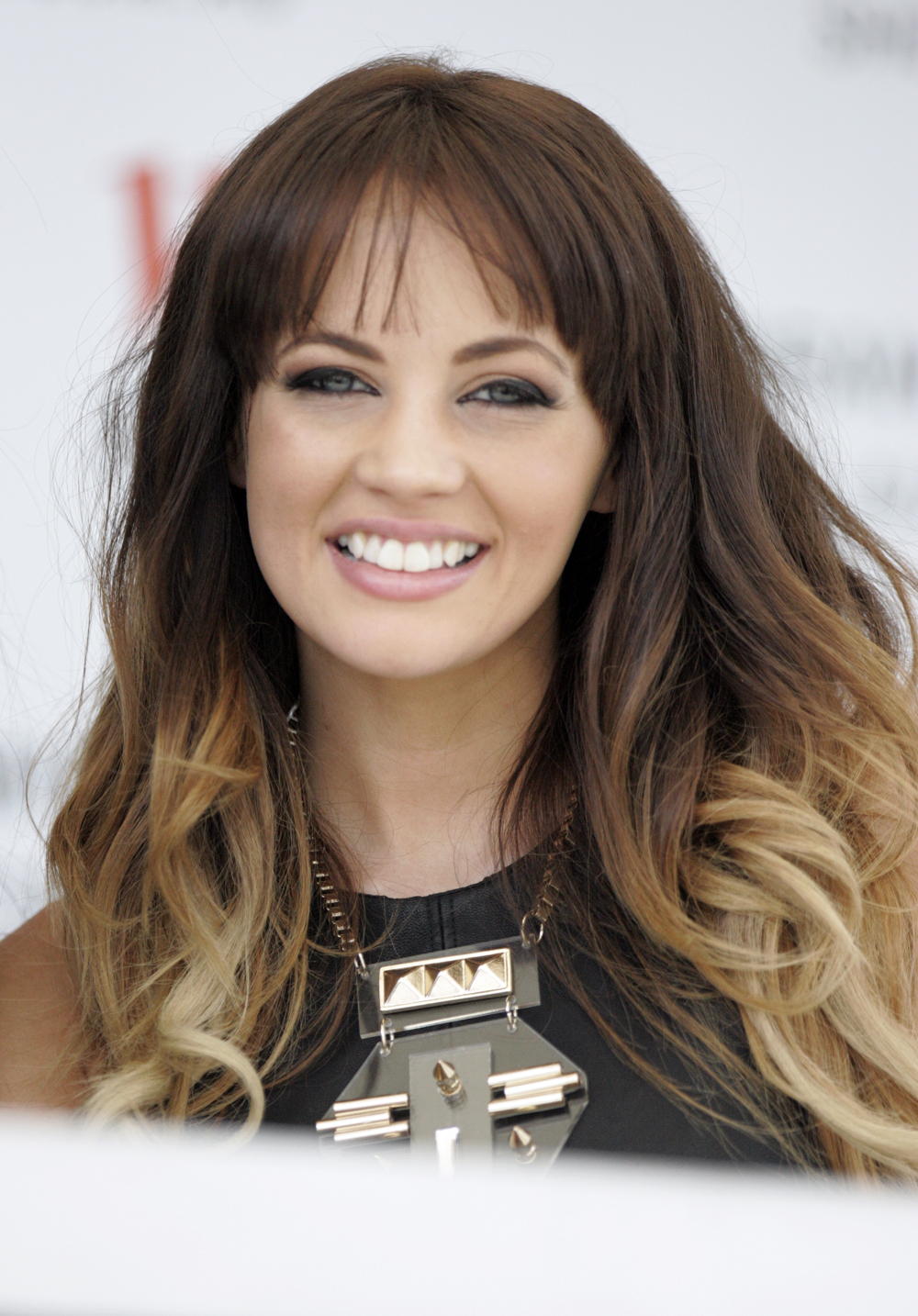
Jade in 2012

After winning The X Factor, Jade's winner's single "What You've Done to Me" was released digitally via iTunes. After three days of release, the song debuted at number one on the ARIA Singles Chart. It was certified triple platinum by the Australian Recording Industry Association (ARIA), denoting sales of 210,000 copies. Jade's self-titled debut album was released on 7 December 2012, featuring re-recorded versions of the songs she performed on The X Factor. The album debuted at number three on the ARIA Albums Chart and was certified gold, denoting shipments of 35,000 copies.

On 5 December 2012, Jade's former record label Camp West Recorders released her original first album The Golden Touch on iTunes without Jade or Sony Music's permission. Camp West Recorders Inc. company presidents John Harris and Ty Knox sued Jade for damages and alleged contract breaches as well as Sony Music, Parade Artists, FremantleMedia Australia and Simon Cowell's Syco Entertainment. Harris and Knox claimed that they were entitled to a share of Jade's income because they signed a development deal with her when she moved to Los Angeles at age 15 to launch a music career, and that Camp West's contract with her was still valid. The pair also claimed they spent $2 million developing her as an artist.

=== 2013–2016: INXS: Never Tear Us Apart, Nine and Home and Away ===
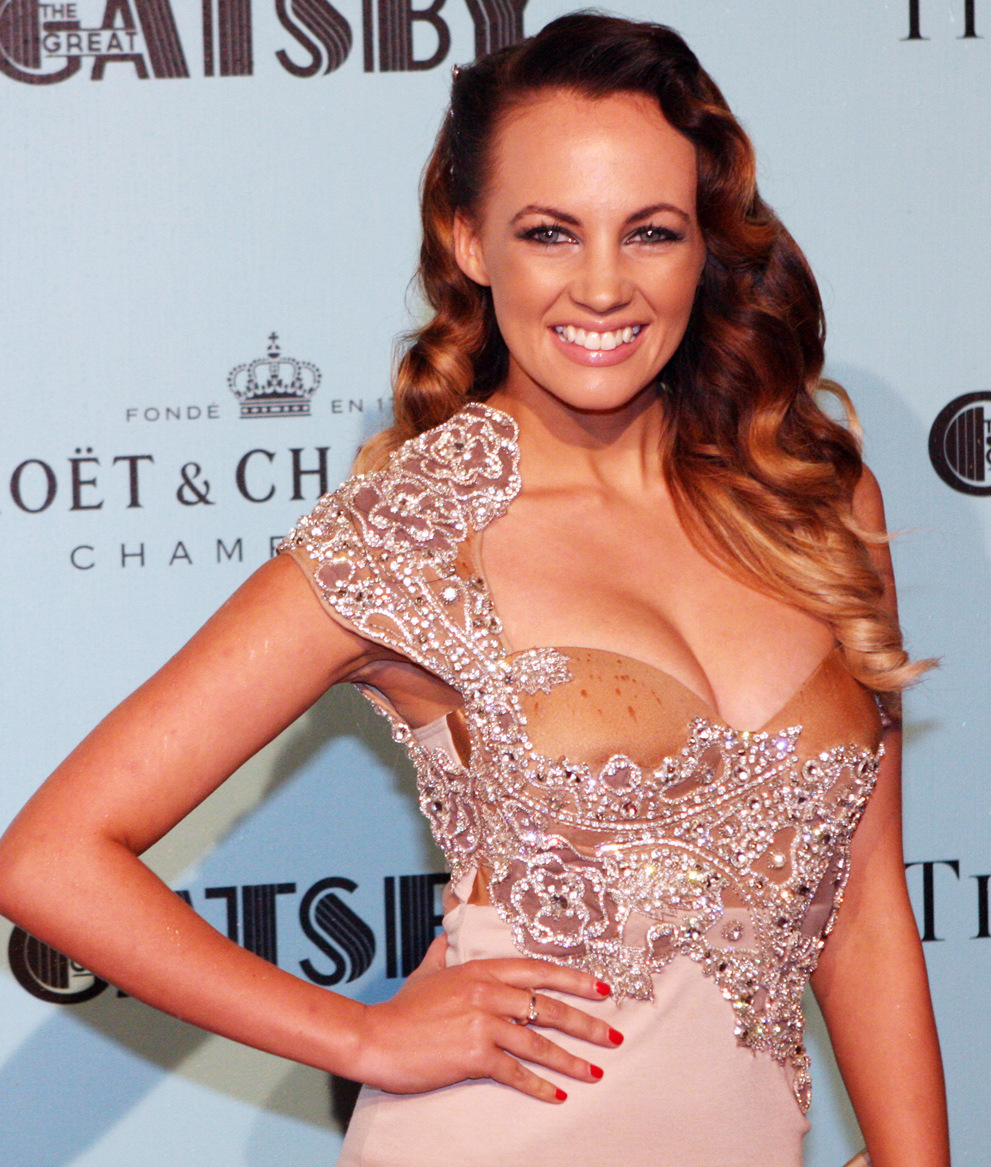
Jade at the Sydney premiere of The Great Gatsby in May 2013

In January 2013, Jade headlined The X Factor Live Tour performing shows in the Gold Coast, Sydney, Melbourne, Adelaide and Perth. The lead single from Jade's second studio album, Firestarter, was released on 28 June 2013. It debuted and peaked at number nine on the ARIA Singles Chart and was certified Platinum, for selling 70,000 copies. Jade co-designed her own jewellery line with Diva accessories. In August 2013, Jade performed in Indonesia for RCTI's 24th anniversary television special, X Factor Around the World, along with The Collective, Jahméne Douglas, Melanie Amaro, Novita Dewi and Fatin Shidqia. Jade performed "Firestarter" in the first week of the fifth season of The X Factor. During her performance on The X Factor, it was announced that Jade was working on her second album. She won Best Video for "Firestarter" at the 27th ARIA Music Awards. Jade released a second single from her upcoming album, entitled "Soldier" on 15 November 2013, which peaked at number 17 and was later certified Gold, for selling 35,000 copies.

On 24 January 2014, Jade released a cover of "I Am Australian" with Dami Im, Jessica Mauboy, Justice Crew, Nathaniel Willemse and Taylor Henderson, to coincide with the Australia Day celebrations. The song peaked at number 51 on the ARIA Singles Chart. Jade played Kylie Minogue in the mini-series INXS: Never Tear Us Apart, televised on the Seven Network in February 2014. Jade was nominated for "Most Popular New Talent" at the Logie awards for the role. Jade released a third single from her second album on 11 April 2014, entitled "Up!". It peaked at number 18 and was later certified Gold, for selling 35,000 copies. On 3 September 2014, Jade performed in Los Angeles as part of Nova FM's Red Room Global Tour.

Jade was the supporting act for One Direction's Australian leg of their On the Road Again Tour in February 2015. On 17 July 2015, Jade released a new single, "Shake That", featuring American rapper Pitbull. It served as the lead single for her long-awaited second studio album. On 5 September 2015, it was announced that Jade had joined the cast of the long-running soap opera Home and Away as Isla Schultz. She made her first appearance during the episode broadcast on 3 March 2016.

Jade's second studio album, Nine, was released on 20 November 2015. Jade confirmed in March 2016 that she was currently working on her third album and was hoping to release it by the end of 2016. It could contain the upcoming singles 'Crushed' and 'Ooh Ooh Ooh' that are mentioned on the Ascap website. In 2016, it was announced that Jade had been cast as Tracey Tyler in the Nine Network mini-series House of Bond.

On 28 October 2016, Jade announced a new single "Hurt Anymore" in collaboration with Cyrus Villanueva, which was released on 4 November.

=== 2017–2018: Cosmetic line, touring, Best of My Love and The Magic of Christmas ===
In early 2017, Jade joined the Boyzlife British and England tour. On 6 March 2017, Jade partnered with Models Prefer to launch her debut cosmetic line "Samantha Jade for Models Prefer". On 26 May 2017 Jade released her new single "Circles On the Water".

On 22 February 2018, Jade announced that she will release her third studio album Best of My Love on 20 April 2018.

In November 2018, Jade released her fourth studio album The Magic of Christmas.

=== 2019–present: Love.Sick Volume 1 and 2 ===
In early 2019, Jade confirmed she was working on her fifth studio album, expected to have original material. In September 2019, Jade released "Bounce", the lead single from the album. Discussing the album with Star Observer, she stated that "this time [around], I've asked: 'What are songs I'd listen to?' or 'What are songs that I would save or put on my Spotify or Apple Music?' There are a variety of songs on [the album]. We've got some ballads, we've got some ups ... basically, it's just an array of music that I love. That's what we've really gone with. A lot of the time you chase radio and you chase a sound that's out there [but] I've gone back to what I like and that's really empowering."

She further explained that "It's more about listening to my fanbase and myself. Just going, 'What do my fans like to hear from me?' and I've kind of gone back to a sound that I was inspired by. When I started writing when I was fifteen and moved to LA, I was writing songs because I loved Brandy and TLC and J-Lo, so it all made sense to me." On 31 January 2020, Jade released "In the Morning".

In September 2020, Jade was one of the celebrity faces for Kit Kat's R U OK? Day social media campaign.

On 3 October 2020, Jade released the single "Back 2 Back", and during a Facebook performance confirmed that the album is completed. Jade released another single on 20 November 2020, titled "New Boy". The album was later scrapped in favor of a new EP.

In May 2022, Jade appeared as a contestant on the sixth season of The Celebrity Apprentice Australia.

On 17 June 2022, Jade released the single "Dance Again", her first release with Midnight Records after her departure from Sony Music earlier that year. In November 2022, Jade confirmed the release of the Love.Sick EP, released on 25 November 2022.

On 23 November 2023, Jade released her new original Christmas song titled "Christmas Kisses".

On 7 July 2024, Jade competed on season 21 of the Australian version of Dancing with the Stars and was partnered with professional Gustavo Viglio. They were later declared runners-up at the grand finals and finished 2nd place. A few days after the finale on August 16, Jade released the five-song EP titled Love.Sick.Vol.2, through label 3Keys Records, with its lead single "Peachy".

== Artistry ==
Jade is a light-lyric soprano and cites Beyoncé, Robyn, and Mariah Carey as her musical influences. Her debut original album was a pop record. She describes "Nine" as personal, and she felt like she was playing a character on her Best Of My Love album of disco covers. Her voice is breezy and bright. She has an angelic voice and co-wrote parts of Nine, "Born to Be Alive" and "Wait for It" which are considered poppy

== Personal life ==
Jade previously lived in Los Angeles to pursue her singing career. After struggling to get a new record deal in the United States, she moved back to Perth and began working at her father's warehouse in Guildford, Western Australia. She later relocated to Sydney, where she was a makeup artist while still gigging.

In early 2019, Jade announced her engagement to Pat Handlin, the son of Denis Handlin, the former CEO of Sony Music Australia. The couple got married in October 2022 during an intimate wedding in Venice, Italy.

== Concert tours ==
Headlining

- The X Factor Live Tour (2013)
- ChapStick Summer Lovin' Tour (2013)
- Only Just Begun Club Tour (2016)
- Coca-Cola Christmas Truck Tour (2017)
- Best Of My Love Live Tour (2018)
- Coca-Cola Salvation Army 'It Feels So Good to Give' Christmas Truck Tour (2018)
- Love / Sick Mini Tour (2022)

Supporting

- Nova's Red Room Global Tour (Series 1: 2014)
- One Direction's On the Road Again Tour: Australian leg (2015)
- Boyzlife's Stories – Laughter – Music Tour: UK leg (2017)
- Paul Murray's Live in Our Town (2019)
- Pentatonix's Pentatonix: The World Tour: Australian and New Zealand leg (2020)
- Backstreet Boys' DNA World Tour: Australian leg (2023)

Guest

- Guy Sebastian's Get Along Tour: "Art of Love" with Guy Sebastian (Sydney – 20 April 2013)
- Beyoncé's The Mrs. Carter Show World Tour: "Breakeven" with Stan Walker (Sydney – 11 November 2013)
- Taylor Swift's Red Tour: "Art of Love" with Guy Sebastian (Sydney – 4 December 2013)

== Discography ==
=== Studio albums ===
- Nine (2015)

=== Christmas albums ===
- The Magic of Christmas (2018)

=== Cover albums ===
- Samantha Jade (2012)
- Best of My Love (2018)

== Filmography ==
List of film and television appearances
Year	Title	Role	Notes
2006	American Dreamz	Show contestant, minor role	Movie
2009	Glee	Herself, vocals on "Bootilicious"	Season 1, episode 11: "Hairography"
2009	Sorority Wars	Herself, vocals on "Get Away"	TV movie
2010	Beneath the Blue	Kita, supporting role	Movie
2012	The X Factor Australia	Herself, contestant	Season 4 winner
2013	X Factor Around the World	Herself	TV special
2014	INXS: Never Tear Us Apart	Kylie Minogue, supporting role	Mini-series, 2 episodes
2015	Neighbours 30th: The Stars Reunite	Herself	TV special
2016	Home and Away	Isla Schultz, guest role	13 episodes
2016	The Morning Show	Herself, co-host	1 episode
2017	Home and Away: All or Nothing	Isla Schultz, supporting role	TV special
2017	The Morning Show	Herself, co-host	1 episode
2017	House of Bond	Tracey Tyler, supporting role	Mini-series, 2 episodes
2017	Love Child	Singer 2, guest role	Season 4, episode 8
2017	In Tune	Herself, guest role	Season 2, episode 4
2018	Super Fan	Herself, guest role	Season 3, episode 1
2018	Magic of Christmas with Samantha Jade	Herself, host	TV special
2019	Our Town	Herself	TV special
2020	Me@Home	Herself, guest role	Season 1
2020	Christmas With The Salvos	Herself, host	TV special
2021	Christmas With The Salvos	Herself, host	TV special
2022	The Celebrity Apprentice Australia	Herself, contestant	Season 6
2023	Loud + Proud	Herself, guest role	Season 1, episode 6
2023	Blow Up	Herself, guest judge	Season 1, episode 3
2023	Christmas With The Salvos	Herself, host	TV special
2024	The Salvation Army: Red Shield Appeal	Herself, host	TV special
2024	Dancing with the Stars (Australia)	Herself, contestant	Season 21 runner-up
2024	Christmas With The Salvos	Herself, host	TV special
2025	Christmas with Delta	Herself, guest role	TV special
2026	Australian Idol	Herself, guest role	Season 11, episode 17

== Credits ==
=== Theatre ===
Year	Title	Role	Director	Venue	Ref.
2025 - 2026	Pretty Woman The Musical	Vivian Ward	Jerry Mitchell	Queensland Performing Arts Centre in Brisbane, Theatre Royal Sydney, Crown Perth, Her Majesty's Theatre, Adelaide and Regent Theatre, Melbourne	

== Awards and nominations ==
Year	Nominee / work	Award	Result
2012	Poprepublic.tv IT List Awards	Favourite Single of 2012 ("What You've Done to Me")	Nominated
2012	Poprepublic.tv IT List Awards	Favourite Album of 2012 (Samantha Jade)	Nominated
2012	Poprepublic.tv IT List Awards	Favourite Australian Female Artist	Won
2012	Poprepublic.tv IT List Awards	Breakthrough Artist of 2012	Nominated
2013	Cosmopolitan Fun, Fearless, Female Awards	Singer	Nominated
2013	ARIA Music Awards	Song of the Year ("What You've Done to Me")	Nominated
2013	ARIA Music Awards	Best Video ("Firestarter" directed by Christopher Frey)	Won
2013	Channel [V] Awards	[V] Oz Artist of the Year	Nominated
2013	Poprepublic.tv Awards	Favourite Australian Female Artist	Nominated
2013	Poprepublic.tv Awards	Favourite Single of 2013 ("Firestarter")	Nominated
2014	Nickelodeon Kids' Choice Awards	Aussies' Fave Homegrown Talent	Nominated
2014	World Music Awards	World's Best Female Artist	Nominated
2014	World Music Awards	World's Best Live Act	Nominated
2014	World Music Awards	World's Best Entertainer of the Year	Nominated
2014	World Music Awards	World's Best Song ("Firestarter")	Nominated
2014	World Music Awards	World's Best Video ("Firestarter")	Nominated
2014	Cosmopolitan Fun, Fearless, Female Awards	Singer	Nominated
2014	Channel [V] Awards	[V] Oz Artist of the Year	Nominated
2014	WA Music Award	Best Pop Act	Nominated
2015	Logie Awards	Most Popular New Talent (INXS: Never Tear Us Apart)	Nominated
2015	Cosmopolitan Fun, Fearless, Female Awards	Singer	Nominated
2016	Cosmopolitan Fun, Fearless, Female Awards	Singer	Nominated
2017	Cosmopolitan Women of the Year Awards	Performer of the Year	Nominated
2017	Auspop Awards	Artist of the Year	Nominated
2019	ARIA Music Awards	Best Adult Contemporary Album (The Magic of Christmas)	Nominated
2020	Gold Coast Music Awards	Song of the Year ("Forget It All" feat. Sunset City)	Nominated
2022	All for Music	Top 50 Biggest Australian Artists	49
2025	Growing Up Gupta Magazine	Masala Monday Muse	Won

Preceded by Reece Mastin	The X Factor (Australia); Winner; 2012	Succeeded by Dami Im
