= Harmony Samuels production discography =

The following songs were produced by Harmony Samuels.

== 2005-2010 ==
| Year | Artist | Song | Album | Ref |
|---|---|---|---|---|
| 2005 | Nate James | "Universal" H-Money Remix (Extended Version) | Universal | |
| 2007 | Jamelia | Walk With Me | "Something About You (H-Money Refix)" | |
| 2007 | Pyrelli | Vitamin A: A Twist of Fate | "Cant Be Asked" ft. Harmony "H-Money" Samuels | |
| 2009 | Chipmunk | I Am Chipmunk | "Look For Me" | |
| 2010 | Chipmunk | Transition | "Flying High" | |
| 2010 | Chipmunk | Transition | "Champion" ft. Chris Brown | |
| 2010 | Chipmunk | Transition | "In the Air" ft. Keri Hilson | |
| 2010 | Chipmunk | Transition | "Take Off" ft. Trey Songz | |
| 2010 | Chipmunk | Transition | "Follow My Lead" ft. Eric Bellinger | |
| 2010 | Chipmunk | Transition | "White Lies" ft. Kalenna Harper of Diddy – Dirty Money | |
| 2010 | Chipmunk | Transition | "Armageddon" ft. Wretch 32 | |
| 2010 | Chipmunk | Transition | "Picture Me" ft. Ace Young | |
| 2010 | Chipmunk | Transition | "Pray For Me" | |
| 2010 | Jawan Harris | Single | "Nobody" | |
| 2010 | Maroon 5 | Hands All Over | "No Curtain Call" | |
| 2010 | Janelle Monáe | For Colored Girls Original Soundtrack | "Without A Fight" | |
| 2010 | Tiwa Savage | Once Upon a Time | "Kele Kele Love" | |
| 2010 | Tiwa Savage | Once Upon a Time | "Love Me 3x" | |

== 2011-2015 ==
| Year | Artist | Song | Album | Ref |
|---|---|---|---|---|
| 2011 | Mary J. Blige | My Life II... The Journey Continues (Act 1) | "Irreversible" | |
| 2011 | Chris Brown | F.A.M.E. | "Say It With Me" | |
| 2011 | Chris Brown | F.A.M.E. | "Oh My Love" | |
| 2011 | Chipmunk | Single | "In the Air" ft. Keri Hilson | |
| 2011 | Chipmunk | Single | "Take Off" ft. Trey Songz | |
| 2011 | From Above | Breaking From Above | "Not the Same Girl" | |
| 2011 | From Above | Breaking From Above | "Funny" | |
| 2011 | From Above | Breaking From Above | "Gotta Play It Fair" | |
| 2011 | Thelma Houston | Single | "Gliding On Love" | |
| 2011 | JLS | Jukebox | "So Many Girls" | |
| 2011 | Jacob Latimore | Single | "Nothing On Me" | |
| 2012 | Brandy | Two Eleven | "Without You" | |
| 2012 | Chris Brown | Fortune | "Mirage" ft. Nas | |
| 2012 | Chris Brown | Fortune | "Wait For You" | |
| 2012 | Chip | London Boy | "Slick Rick" | |
| 2012 | Chip | London Boy | "Beautiful" | |
| 2012 | Chip | London Boy | "It's Alright" ft. Sevyn | |
| 2012 | Keyshia Cole | Woman to Woman | "Enough of No Love" ft. Lil Wayne | |
| 2012 | Jennifer Hudson | Think Like a Man Original Soundtrack | "Think Like a Man" ft. Ne-Yo & Rick Ross | |
| 2012 | JLS | Evolution | "Talk It Out" | |
| 2012 | Ne-Yo | R.E.D. | "Don't Make Em Like You" ft. Wiz Khalifa | |
| 2012 | Keke Palmer | Keke Palmer | "You Got Me" ft. Kevin McCall | |
| 2012 | Keke Palmer | Keke Palmer | "Dance Alone" | |
| 2012 | Guy Sebastian | Armageddon | "Gold" | |
| 2012 | B. Smyth | Single | "Leggo" ft. 2 Chainz | |
| 2012 | Sevyn Streeter | Single | "I Like It" | |
| 2013 | B5 | Single | "Say Yes" | |
| 2013 | Marcus Canty | This...Is Marcus Canty | "In & Out" ft. Wale | |
| 2013 | Marcus Canty | This...Is Marcus Canty | "Three Words" | |
| 2013 | Fantasia | Side Effects of You | "Supernatural Love" ft. Big K.R.I.T. | |
| 2013 | Fantasia | Side Effects of You | "Ain't All Bad" | |
| 2013 | Fantasia | Side Effects of You | "If I Was A Bird" | |
| 2013 | Fantasia | Side Effects of You | "Girl Talk (Interlude)" ft. Amber Riley, Yalonda Johnson, & Jennifer Jordan | |
| 2013 | Fantasia | Side Effects of You | "Without Me" ft. Kelly Rowland & Missy Elliott | |
| 2013 | Fantasia | Side Effects of You | "Get It Right" | |
| 2013 | Fantasia | Side Effects of You | "So Much to Prove" | |
| 2013 | Fantasia | Side Effects of You | "Change Your Mind" | |
| 2013 | Fantasia | Side Effects of You | "Lighthouse" | |
| 2013 | Fantasia | Side Effects of You | "Lose to Win" | |
| 2013 | Fantasia | Side Effects of You | "End of Me" | |
| 2013 | Fantasia | Side Effects of You | "In Deep" | |
| 2013 | Fantasia | Side Effects of You | "Haunted" (Bonus Track) ft. Tank, King Los, Al Sherrod Lambert, & Jamia | |
| 2013 | Fantasia | Side Effects of You | "To The Heaven" (Bonus Track) | |
| 2013 | Fantasia | Side Effects of You | "Kiss Bang Boom" (Bonus Track) | |
| 2013 | Fifth Harmony | Better Together (EP) | "Better Together" | |
| 2013 | Ariana Grande | Yours Truly | "Right There" ft. Big Sean | |
| 2013 | Ariana Grande | Yours Truly | "Piano" | |
| 2013 | Ariana Grande | Yours Truly | "The Way" ft. Mac Miller | |
| 2013 | Ariana Grande | Yours Truly | "Almost Is Never Enough" ft. Nathan Sykes | |
| 2013 | Ariana Grande | Yours Truly | "Better Left Unsaid" | |
| 2013 | Ariana Grande | Yours Truly | "The Way (Spanglish Version)" ft. J Balvin | |
| 2013 | Kelly Rowland | Talk a Good Game | "Gone" ft. Wiz Khalifa | |
| 2013 | Kelly Rowland | Talk a Good Game | "You Changed" ft. Beyoncé & Michelle Williams | |
| 2013 | Kelly Rowland | Talk a Good Game | "Put Your Name on It" | |
| 2013 | Various Artists | The Best Man Holiday soundtrack | "What Christmas Means to Me" (Fantasia) | |
| 2013 | Various Artists | The Best Man Holiday soundtrack | "As" (Marsha Ambrosius & Anthony Hamilton) | |
| 2013 | Various Artists | The Best Man Holiday soundtrack | "O Holy Night" (Jayda Brown & Jasmine Watkins, Monica Calhoun) | |
| 2013 | Zendaya | Zendaya | "Fireflies" | |
| 2014 | Tamar Braxton | Single | "Let Me Know" ft. Future | |
| 2014 | Ariana Grande | My Everything | "You Don't Know Me" | |
| 2014 | Ariana Grande | My Everything | "Too Close" | |
| 2014 | Jennifer Lopez | A.K.A (Deluxe Version) | "Let It Be Me" | |
| 2014 | Teyana Taylor | VII | "It Could Just Be Love (Interlude)" | |
| 2014 | Teyana Taylor | VII | "Put Your Love On" | |
| 2014 | Teyana Taylor | VII | "It Could Just Be Love" | |
| 2014 | Jasmine V | That's Me Right There (EP) | "That's Me Right There" ft. Kendrick Lamar | |
| 2014 | Jasmine V | That's Me Right There (EP) | "Me Without You" | |
| 2014 | Jasmine V | That's Me Right There (EP) | "Walk Away" | |
| 2014 | Jasmine V | That's Me Right There (EP) | "I Love Your Crazy" | |
| 2014 | Jasmine V | That's Me Right There (EP) | "Who That" | |
| 2014 | Michelle Williams | Journey to Freedom | "Need Your Help" ft. Eric Dawkins | |
| 2014 | Michelle Williams | Journey to Freedom | "Yes" | |
| 2014 | Michelle Williams | Journey to Freedom | "Everything" | |
| 2014 | Michelle Williams | Journey to Freedom | "Fall" ft. Lecrae & Tye Tribbett | |
| 2014 | Michelle Williams | Journey to Freedom | "Fire" | |
| 2014 | Michelle Williams | Journey to Freedom | "Free" | |
| 2014 | Michelle Williams | Journey to Freedom | "Just Like You" ft. Chief Wakil | |
| 2014 | Michelle Williams | Journey to Freedom | "Beautiful" | |
| 2014 | Michelle Williams | Journey to Freedom | "Believe In Me" | |
| 2014 | Michelle Williams | Journey to Freedom | "In The Morning" | |
| 2014 | Michelle Williams | Journey to Freedom | "If We Had Your Eyes" ft. Fantasia | |
| 2014 | Michelle Williams | Journey to Freedom | "Say Yes" ft. Beyoncé & Kelly Rowland | |
| 2014 | Nikki Yanofsky | Little Secret | "Little Secret" | |
| 2014 | Nikki Yanofsky | Little Secret | "Necessary Evil" | |
| 2015 | Tamar Braxton | Calling All Lovers | "Let Me Know" ft. Future | |
| 2015 | Ciara | Jackie | "Jackie (B.M.F.)" | |
| 2015 | Ciara | Jackie | "Stuck on You" | |
| 2015 | Ciara | Jackie | "I Bet" | |
| 2015 | Ciara | Jackie | "I Got You" | |
| 2015 | Ciara | Jackie | "One Woman Army (Intro)" | |
| 2015 | Ciara | Jackie | "I Bet (Remix)" ft. Joe Jonas | |
| 2015 | Fifth Harmony | Reflection | "Body Rock" | |
| 2015 | Fifth Harmony | Reflection | "I'm In Love With A Monster" | |
| 2015 | JoJo | III. (EP) | "Say Love" | |
| 2015 | Nathan Sykes | Unfinished Business | "Money" | |
| 2015 | Nathan Sykes | Unfinished Business | "Famous" | |
| 2015 | Nathan Sykes | Unfinished Business | "Over and Over Again" | |
| 2015 | Nathan Sykes | Unfinished Business | "Burn Me Down" | |
| 2015 | Various Artists | Hotel Transylvania 2 soundtrack | "I'm in Love with a Monster" (Fifth Harmony) | |

== 2016-2020 ==
| Year | Artist | Song | Album | Ref |
|---|---|---|---|---|
| 2016 | Angel | HER (EP) | "Fvck With You" ft. Rich Homie Quan | |
| 2016 | Jakubi | 61 Berkley (EP) | "Pillow" | |
| 2016 | Mali Music | Single | "Digital" | |
| 2016 | Major | i am MAJOR. (EP) | "Why I Love You" | |
| 2016 | Major | i am MAJOR. (EP) | "Hit the Road" ft. Mali Music | |
| 2016 | Major | i am MAJOR. (EP) | "My Future" | |
| 2016 | Major | i am MAJOR. (EP) | "All Day Tho" (Interlude) | |
| 2016 | Major | i am MAJOR. (EP) | "My Oh My" | |
| 2016 | Major | i am MAJOR. (EP) | "Serendipity" ft. Jade Novah | |
| 2016 | Major | i am MAJOR. (EP) | "Way of the World" | |
| 2016 | Major | i am MAJOR. (EP) | "Keep On" ft. Kevin McCall | |
| 2016 | Major | i am MAJOR. (EP) | "CHANGERIGHTNOW" ft. Amber Riley | |
| 2016 | Major | i am MAJOR. (EP) | "Why I Love You (Dance Remix)" | |
| 2016 | Pia Mia | Single | "We Should Be Together" | |
| 2016 | Seyi Shay | Seyi or Shay | "Right Now" | |
| 2017 | Marsha Ambrosius | Single | "Luh Ya" | |
| 2017 | Chip | League of My Own II | "About Time" ft. Kojo Funds | |
| 2017 | Chip | League of My Own II | "Hit Me Up" ft. Ella Mai | |
| 2017 | Chip | League of My Own II | "Settings" | |
| 2017 | Keyshia Cole | 11:11 Reset | "You" ft. Remy Ma & French Montana | |
| 2017 | Fifth Harmony | Fifth Harmony | "Sauced Up" | |
| 2017 | Jack and Jack | Gone (EP) | "Hurt People" | |
| 2017 | Mic Lowry | MOOD (EP) | Can't Lie" | |
| 2017 | Mic Lowry | MOOD (EP) | "Boomerang" | |
| 2017 | Mali Music | The Transition of Mali | "Bow Out" | |
| 2017 | Mali Music | The Transition of Mali | "I Will" | |
| 2017 | MGK | Bloom | "Wake + Bake" | |
| 2017 | MGK | Bloom | "Can't Walk" | |
| 2017 | MGK | Bloom | "Rehab" | |
| 2017 | Moxie Raia | Single | "Wheels" | |
| 2017 | La'Porsha Renae | Already All Ready | "What Is Love" | |
| 2017 | La'Porsha Renae | Already All Ready | "Good Woman" | |
| 2017 | La'Porsha Renae | Already All Ready | "Hideout" | |
| 2017 | La'Porsha Renae | Already All Ready | "When In Rome" | |
| 2017 | La'Porsha Renae | Already All Ready | "Breathe" | |
| 2017 | La'Porsha Renae | Already All Ready | "No Problem (Self Talk)" | |
| 2017 | La'Porsha Renae | Already All Ready | "Already All Ready" | |
| 2017 | La'Porsha Renae | Already All Ready | "Will You Fight" | |
| 2017 | La'Porsha Renae | Already All Ready | "Lock You Down" | |
| 2017 | La'Porsha Renae | Already All Ready | "Send Me Your Love" | |
| 2018 | Angel | WOMAN | "Return of the Mackin" | |
| 2018 | The Bonfyre | Ready to Love (EP) | "Ready to Love" | |
| 2018 | The Bonfyre | Ready to Love (EP) | "Keep Me Waiting" | |
| 2018 | Ella Mai | Ella Mai | "Cheapshot" | |
| 2018 | Empire Cast | Empire Soundtrack (Season 5) | "We've Got Time" ft. Mario | |
| 2018 | Empire Cast | Empire Soundtrack (Season 5) | "Look At Us Now" ft. Jussie Smollett | |
| 2018 | Empire Cast | Empire Soundtrack (Season 5) | "Filling Spaces" | |
| 2018 | Empire Cast | Empire Soundtrack (Season 5) | "Make It Last" | |
| 2018 | Estelle | Lovers Rock | "Better" | |
| 2018 | Janet Jackson | Single | "Made for Now" ft. Daddy Yankee | |
| 2018 | June's Diary | All of Us | "Have You Ever" | |
| 2018 | Major | Even More | "Honest" (Single) | |
| 2018 | Major | Even More | "Better With You In It" | |
| 2018 | Major | Even More | "Love Me Ole" ft. Kas | |
| 2018 | Major | Even More | "Love Crazy" ft. Andre Troutman | |
| 2018 | Major | Even More | "Shine Bright" | |
| 2018 | Major | Even More | "New Day" | |
| 2018 | Major | Even More | "Even More" | |
| 2018 | Major | Even More | "Street Lights" | |
| 2018 | Major | Even More | "Why I Love You" ft. NSTASIA | |
| 2018 | OK Mayday | Conversations | "Good" | |
| 2018 | OK Mayday | Conversations | "Cut Too Deep" | |
| 2018 | OK Mayday | Conversations | "Something More" | |
| 2018 | Lauren Sanderson | Dont Panic! | "The Only One" | |
| 2018 | Lauren Sanderson | Dont Panic! | "In The Middle" | |
| 2018 | SiR | November | "Dreaming of Me" | |
| 2019 | The Bonfyre | Single | "U Say" ft. 6lack | |
| 2019 | Chef Sean | Single | "No Name" ft. Siya | |
| 2019 | ELHAE | Trouble in Paradise | "Moments" ft. Sevyn Streeter | |
| 2019 | Kas | Single | "This Side" | |
| 2019 | Kas | Single | "Dizzy" | |
| 2019 | MAJOR. | Single | "Even More" ft. Brandy | |
| 2019 | MAJOR. | Single | "Love Me Ole (Latin Remix)" ft. Cierra Ramirez | |
| 2019 | Next Town Down | Juliet | "Bussdown" ft. Rich the Kid | |
| 2019 | Rick Ross | Port of Miami 2 | "Summer Reign" ft. Summer Walker | |
| 2019 | Rotimi | Single | "Love Riddim" Remix ft. Akon | |
| 2019 | Rotimi | Single | "In My Bed" ft. Wale | |
| 2019 | Rotimi | Walk With Me | "Love Riddim" | |
| 2019 | Rotimi | Walk With Me | "Decisions" | |
| 2019 | Kelly Rowland | Single | "Crown" | |
| 2019 | Kierra Sheard | Single | "Don't Judge Me" | |
| 2019 | Tank | ELEVATION | "WWJD" | |
| 2019 | Robin Thicke | Single | "When You Love Somebody" | |
| 2019 | Tigo B | Single | "Too Dumb" | |
| 2020 | The Bonfyre | Love, Lust & Let Downs: Chapter One - EP | "U Say" ft. 6lack | |
| 2020 | The Bonfyre | Love, Lust & Let Downs: Chapter One - EP | "U Remind Me" ft. Wale | |
| 2020 | The Bonfyre | Love, Lust & Let Downs: Chapter One - EP | "Pay Them No Mind" | |
| 2020 | Rhyon Brown | Single | "Leaves" | |
| 2020 | Rhyon Brown | Single | "Weakend" ft. D Smoke | |
| 2020 | Chef Sean | Single | "No Name" Remix ft. Jeremih | |
| 2020 | Empire Cast | Empire Soundtrack (Season 6) | "Bossy" ft. Serayah & Ta'Rhonda Jones | |
| 2020 | Macy Kate | Cry For Help | "Good Time" | |
| 2020 | Kas | Long Story Short | "Right Back" ft. Kaye Fox | |
| 2020 | Kas | Long Story Short | "This Side" | |
| 2020 | Kas | Long Story Short | "Dizzy" | |
| 2020 | Kas | Long Story Short | "Black" | |
| 2020 | MAJOR. | Single | "Doves Cry" | |
| 2020 | Ok Mayday | Single | "Blossoms" | |
| 2020 | Ok Mayday | Single | "Kind of Promising" | |
| 2020 | Queen Naija | Missunderstood | "I'm Her" | |
| 2020 | Queen Naija | Missunderstood | "Beautiful" | |
| 2020 | Carmen Reece | Evoke | "Daydreaming" | |
| 2020 | Rotimi | Unplugged Sessions EP | "Love Riddim" | |
| 2020 | Rotimi | Unplugged Sessions EP | "In My Bed" | |
| 2020 | Kierra Sheard | Kierra | "Don't Judge Me" ft. Missy Elliott | |
| 2020 | Kierra Sheard | Kierra | "Human" | |
| 2020 | Kierra Sheard | Kierra | "Grateful" | |
| 2020 | Kierra Sheard | Kierra | "Beautiful" | |
| 2020 | Kierra Sheard | Kierra | "Things You Do" | |

== 2021-2023 ==
| Year | Artist | Song | Album | Ref |
|---|---|---|---|---|
| 2021 | Bee-B | Single | "Stretch" | |
| 2021 | Bee-B | Single | "Confidence" | |
| 2021 | Shelley FKA Dram | Shelley FKA DRAM | "All Pride Aside with Summer Walker" ft. Summer Walker | |
| 2021 | Godfather of Harlem | Single | "Shit Don't Feel Right" ft. Buddy | |
| 2021 | GoGo Morrow | | "Love Me" - Usher/Kendrick Lamar MASHUP | |
| 2021 | GoGo Morrow | | "Still Mine" – Yung Bleu/Lil TJay/6LACK/Brownstone MASHUP | |
| 2021 | GoGo Morrow | | "Girls Love Drake" - Drake/Destiny’s Child/Aaliyah/Janet Jackson MASHUP | |
| 2021 | Inayah | Single | "Fallin" | |
| 2021 | Inayah | Single | "What Are We?" | |
| 2021 | Inayah | Side A | "Peaches" | |
| 2021 | Charm La'Donna | La'Donna | "See It" | |
| 2021 | Crystal Nicole | Single | "Miracle" | |
| 2021 | Mechi Peiretti | Single | "Superheroina" | |
| 2021 | Rotimi | All Or Nothing | "All Or Nothing" | |
| 2021 | Rotimi | All Or Nothing | "Weapon" | |
| 2022 | Jen Ash | Sings Empire (Original Score) EP | "We Got Time" | |
| 2022 | Jen Ash | Sings Empire (Original Score) EP | "Filling Spaces" | |
| 2022 | GoGo Morrow | Single | "In The Way" | |
| 2022 | GoGo Morrow | Ready EP | "Comfortable" | |
| 2022 | GoGo Morrow | Ready EP | "Nu Nu" ft. Teddy Riley | |
| 2022 | GoGo Morrow | Ready EP | "I.O.U" | |
| 2022 | GoGo Morrow | Ready EP | "Don't Stop" | |
| 2022 | GoGo Morrow | Ready EP | "In The Way" | |
| 2022 | GoGo Morrow | Ready EP | "Issues" | |
| 2022 | GoGo Morrow | Ready EP | "With You" ft. Symba | |
| 2022 | Ella Mai | Heart On My Sleeve | "Leave You Alone" | |
| 2022 | OK MAYDAY | JUST A PHANTOM (EP) | "Colorful" | |
| 2022 | OK MAYDAY | JUST A PHANTOM (EP) | "Just a Phantom" | |
| 2022 | OK MAYDAY | JUST A PHANTOM (EP) | "Good" | |
| 2022 | OK MAYDAY | JUST A PHANTOM (EP) | "Stepping Down" | |
| 2022 | OK MAYDAY | JUST A PHANTOM (EP) | "Blossoms" | |
| 2022 | OK MAYDAY | JUST A PHANTOM (EP) | "Human (To Be Scared)" | |
| 2022 | Quincy | Q Side B Side (EP) | "Face Off" | |
| 2022 | Quincy | Q Side B Side (EP) | "Biggest Investment" | |
| 2023 | LA'DY | Single | "Love Me Down" | |
| 2023 | Tigo B | Single | "CoPilot" | |
