= Jameil Aossey =

American songwriter, producer, audio engineer

- Born: November 3, 1983 (age 42); Cedar Rapids, Iowa, United States
- Education: Recording Workshop
- Musical career
- Origin: Sylvania, Ohio, United States
- Genres: R&B; pop; hip hop
- Occupations: Songwriter; producer; audio engineer
- Labels: Aossey Entertainment; S.K.P. Inc.; S1A0

Jameil Aossey (born November 3, 1983) is an American songwriter, producer, sound designer and audio engineer best known for his work with producer Symbolyc One. Aossey has written and/or produced songs for Little Mix, ZZ Ward, Jasmine V, Andy Mineo, Rapsody, Labrinth as part of producer group S1A0, Beyoncé's 7th album Renaissance as well as Eminem's 12th album The Death of Slim Shady (Coup de Grâce).

== Early life ==
An early lover of music through piano and drumming lessons before the age of 5, Aossey spent much time with his uncle, who was an Ohio-area radio host with a vast catalog of vinyl records. He graduated from Southview High School in 2002, and in 2004, Aossey enrolled in Ohio's Recording Workshop, becoming a certified audio engineer. He continued working on his craft at New Realm Recording Studios in Toledo, where he had the opportunity to improve his skills in all aspects of the recording process, eventually releasing his debut project The Euphonious Suite in 2010.

== Career ==
Aossey met producer Larry Griffin Jr. (aka Symbolyc One) at the iStandard Producer Showcase during ASCAP EXPO, a 2013 ASCAP Convention in Los Angeles, as Griffin was a judge in and iStandard event Aossey had entered. After receiving feedback from Griffin at the convention, Aossey continued to perfect his submissions through monthly virtual meetings, consistently sending new material, and maintaining correspondence with Griffin after the convention had concluded. Months of collaborative work developed into a mentorship, and Griffin sent Aossey a song to modify, which would become "Walk Away" from Jasmine V's 2014 debut EP That's Me Right There (EP), and Aossey's first placement. Aossey then received an offer to join Griffin's S.K.P production management company as a creative collaborator. Several years later, Beyoncé's team contacted Aossey and Griffin directly to modify several already-existing productions for inclusion on an upcoming project, and 2 of their contributions made her universally-acclaimed, Grammy winning 7th album Renaissance: "I'm That Girl", and "All Up In Your Mind". In 2024, Aossey contributed production on Rapsody's "Black Popstar" from the studio album Please Don't Cry and co-produced Eminem's "Head Honcho" from Grammy nominated album The Death of Slim Shady (Coup de Grâce).

== Discography ==
=== Studio albums ===
- The Euphonious Suite (2010)

== Selected songwriting and production credits ==
Credits are courtesy of Tidal and Spotify.

Title	Year	Artist	Album
"Walk Away"	2014	Jasmine V	That's Me Right There (EP)
"Marry Well"	2015	ZZ Ward	Love and War
"Motivate"	2018	Little Mix	LM5
"Nobody's Coming"	2021	Andy Mineo	Never Land II
"I'm That Girl"	2022	Beyoncé	Renaissance
"All Up In Your Mind"	2022	Beyoncé	Renaissance
"Welcome To Dirty Shine"	2023	ZZ Ward	Dirty Shine
"Fadeaway"	2023	ZZ Ward	Dirty Shine
"Slow Hum Hymnal"	2023	ZZ Ward	Dirty Shine
"Cut Me Loose"	2023	ZZ Ward	Dirty Shine
"Black Popstar"	2024	Rapsody	Please Don't Cry
"Head Honcho"	2024	Eminem	The Death of Slim Shady (Coup de Grâce)
"The Pick Me Up"	2025	Labrinth	Prelude
"I Keep My Promises"	2026	Labrinth	Cosmic Opera Act I
"Running A Red"	2026	Labrinth	Cosmic Opera Act I

== Awards and nominations ==
Year	Ceremony	Award	Result	Ref
2023	65th Annual Grammy Awards	Album of the Year (Renaissance)	Nominated	
2023	65th Annual Grammy Awards	Grammy Award for Best Dance/Electronic Album (Renaissance) ^{A}	Won	

=== Notes ===
A. ^{A} Winning producers in this category with less than a 50% album contribution are awarded with a Winner's Certificate.
