= If We Had Your Eyes =

Single by Michelle Williams

from the album Journey to Freedom
- Released: June 24, 2013
- Studio: London Bridge Studios, L.A.
- Genre: Gospel; R&B; soul
- Length: 4:34
- Label: eOne
- Songwriters: Harmony Samuels; Courtney Harrell; Al Sherrod Lambert
- Producer: Harmony Samuels

Michelle Williams singles chronology
"Waiting on You" (2011)	"If We Had Your Eyes" (2013)	"Fire" (2013)

"If We Had Your Eyes" is a song recorded by American singer Michelle Williams. It was written by Harmony Samuels, Courtney Harrell, and Al Sherrod Lambert for her fourth studio album, Journey to Freedom (2014), with production helmed by Samuels. The song was digitally released worldwide as the album's lead single on June 24, 2013. The official remix of "If We Had Your Eyes" featuring Fantasia was released on November 5, 2013.

== Background ==
In June 2012, it was announced that Williams had signed a record deal with Light Records and eOne Music following her departure from Columbia Records. In February 2013, after reuniting with Destiny's Child for Beyoncé's performance at the Super Bowl XLVII halftime show, Williams revealed to Billboard.com that her fourth solo album and first since the 2008 release Unexpected was "about 80 percent done," and produced primarily by Harmony Samuels as well as Warryn Campbell and Adam Blackstone. Williams described the album as "an inspirational/gospel project," which "sounds like an R&B/pop album". Williams further elaborated on working with Samuels, saying, "Harmony gave me the same tracks he would give to, like, Chris Brown and Kelly Rowland. Sometimes when you say you're doing a gospel album, it seems like people go back to their vaults of music they did in 1992, and I'm like, 'No, give me fresh-sounding music.' So this (album) sounds very current and contemporary."

On June 14, Williams announced "If We Had Your Eyes" as the lead single from her fourth studio album and released a 30-second preview and the release date. On June 29, it was revealed in an interview for Michigan Avenue magazine that the album is titled Journey to Freedom. The song was inspired by a homeless person who "asked [songwriter Al Sherrod Lambert] for some money" and "eventually started speaking into him" after Lambret "gave him all that he had". A remix version of the song featuring additional vocals from fellow R&B singer Fantasia Barrino was released on November 4, 2013.

== Composition and lyrics ==
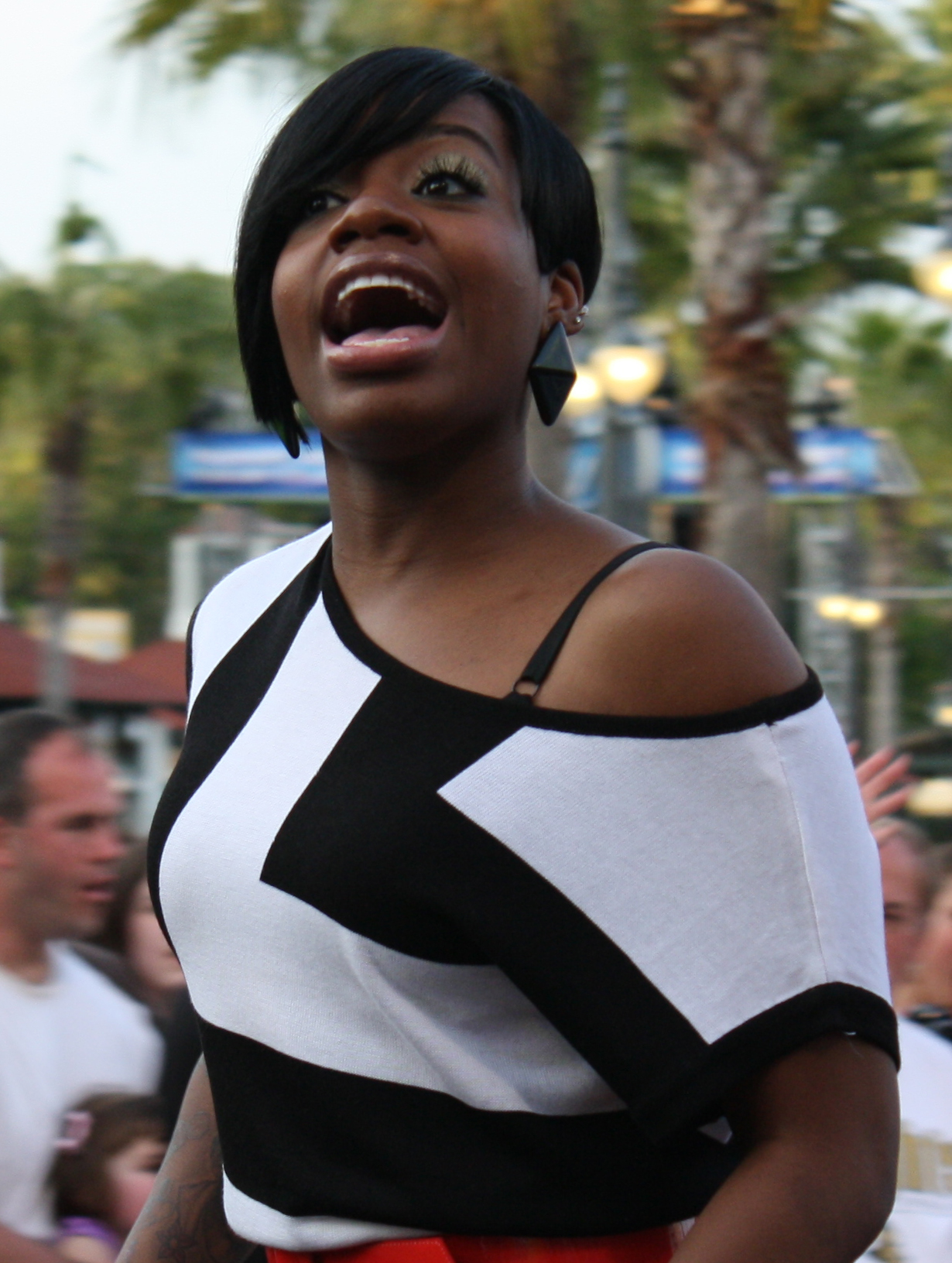
Fantasia Barrino appears on the official remix of "If We Had Your Eyes".

"If We Had Your Eyes" is an R&B and contemporary gospel song. MTV Buzzworthy writer Brad Stern described the song as a "gospel/old-school R&B infused track". Jeff Benjamin of Fuse described the song as "soul-stirring", noting "she sings about God's universal perspective: "People judge from what they see / But Lord, you see the whole heart / If we had your eyes / We'd see things right." Benjamin also wrote "The R&B track ends with a monologue: "God, if I had Your eyes... / I'd be more patient / God, help me to see things the way You see things / Did I already say help me be patient? / I'll say it again" and noted that it "sounds like a modern take on her first solo records, the gospel albums Heart to Yours and Do You Know." According to Christine Thomasos of The Christian Post "Williams sings about two situations where things are not what they seem. The first verse speaks about her helping a person asking for spare change in a life changing moment, while the second verse highlights the life of a woman whose life seems perfect despite the fact that she is going through personal issues."

== Critical reception ==
Brad Stern of MTV Buzzworthy, praised the arrangement and Williams' vocal performance, writing that the "track slowly staggers on in the background and puts one thing at the forefront: Miss Michelle's vocals. As we like to say in the industry, she's really sangin'! Runs for days!" Sam Lansky of Idolator described the song as "a jazzy, soul-inflected throwback that wouldn’t have sounded out of place on Jazmine Sullivan‘s debut album; the hook soars, and Williams’ high, distinct voice fits the melody nicely." Michelle Ryan of Dropout UK also commented on Williams' vocal performance and the lyrical content, writing 'Williams uses her talent to tell a story and ask important questions' on the 'powerful, thought provoking song with vocals that make you wonder why she wasn't used more in her girl band days'. Mike Wass of Idolator dubbed Williams " a child of destiny" for "preaching kindness, love and having faith in a higher power[...]through a song that wouldn’t sound out of place on urban radio". Wass also reviewed the remix featuring Fantasia Barrino positively, writing "the two god-fearing divas make an excellent duo, feeding off each other in the now even-more-inspiring mid-tempo ballad", noting "the best thing about Michelle and Fantasia joining forces is that they both possess such distinctive voices". Wass also expressed, "it’s great to hear someone playing off the Destiny’s Child diva’s gravelly vocal runs and their vocal tug-of-war in the chorus is spine-chilling".

== Music video ==
On July 1, a lyric video was released for the single, described as "suitably righteous" for the "gospel-tinged soul ballad" by Mike Wass of Idolator who also commented that "it’s a simple concept with a stylish, content-appropriate color scheme but the clip really excels when it emphasizes the song’s inspirational message". Wass also affectionately dubbed Williams the "new Queen of social media". On July 30, 2013, Williams revealed on Instagram that shooting of the music video would commence on August 1, 2013. On September 3, 2013, a Derek Blanks-directed music video was premiered via YouTube and features appearances from the song's producer, Harmony Samuels and also former Destiny's Child member, LeToya Luckett.

Described as "introspective", the video "conveys a powerful message" which revolves around three different stories of people who are being wrongly prejudged by others. In one story, Luckett makes a cameo appearance as a friend to a woman dealing with low self-esteem which causes her to self-harm. Also a homeless man asks a woman to spare change. She lowers her car window and doesn't give him anything. Whilst in another, Michelle takes a lesson from a homeless man. The video also features a tribute to Trayvon Martin. Mike Wass of Idolator commented, the "slick set-ups of your typical hip-hop video are represented but there’s a much deeper message here". Elaborating Wass explained, "it’s sad that displays of love, empathy and kindness are usually restricted to religious music" but "Michelle expertly bridges that gap and looks fierce doing it."

== Track listing ==
"If We Had Your Eyes" – Digital download
No.	Title	Length
1.	"If We Had Your Eyes"	4:34

"If We Had Your Eyes" – Digital download
No.	Title	Length
1.	"If We Had Your Eyes" (featuring Fantasia Barrino)	4:34

"If We Had Your Eyes" – US CD single (Walmart exclusive)
No.	Title	Writer(s)	Producer(s)	Length
1.	"If We Had Your Eyes"			4:34
2.	"Fire"	Harmony Samuels, Courtney Harrell	Harmony Samuels	4:31

== Charts ==
Chart (2013)	Peak position
US Adult R&B Songs (Billboard)	19
US Hot Gospel Songs (Billboard)	22
US Hot R&B/Hip-Hop Singles Sales (Billboard)	2
US Hot Singles Sales (Billboard)	5

== Release history ==
Country	Date	Format
Worldwide	June 24, 2013	Digital download
United States	2013	CD
