= That's Me Right There (EP) =

EP by Jasmine V
- Released: November 10, 2014
- Genre: Pop, R&B
- Length: 17:32
- Label: Interscope
- Producer: Harmony Samuels

Jasmine V chronology
S(he) Be(lie)ve(d) (2011)	That's Me Right There (2014)

That's Me Right There is the debut extended play (EP) by American recording artist Jasmine V. It was released on November 10, 2014, by Interscope Records. It was preceded by the release of title track "That's Me Right There" on August 5, 2014.

== Background and development ==
On October 30, 2014, it was confirmed by Villegas via Twitter that the title of the EP would be That's Me Right There with a release date set for November 10. Its cover artwork and track listing were revealed the same day.

== Singles ==
Title track "That's Me Right There" was released on August 5, 2014, as the EP's lead single. After the EP have been released, "I Love Your Crazy" was confirmed as the second lead single, also "Walk Away" as the third lead single.

== Track listing ==
No.	Title	Writer(s)	Length
1.	"That's Me Right There" (featuring Kendrick Lamar)	H. Carmen Reece Culver; Christopher Jackson; Kendrick Duckworth; Aiden Lambert; Harmony Samuels	3:30
2.	"Me Without You"	Samuels; Culver	3:34
3.	"Walk Away"	L. Griffin Jr.; Jameil Aossey; Racella De Guia	3:26
4.	"I Love Your Crazy"	Leon Youngblood; Riley Ulrick	2:32
5.	"Who That"	Harmony Samuels; Samuel Jean	4:28
Total length:			17:32

== Release history ==
Region	Date	Format(s)	Label	Ref.
United States	November 10, 2014	Digital download	Interscope	
