= Fire (Michelle Williams song) =

Single by Michelle Williams

from the album Journey to Freedom
- Released: September 24, 2013
- Studio: London Bridge Studios (Los Angeles, CA)
- Genre: Urban contemporary gospel; R&B
- Length: 3:50
- Label: E1 Music
- Songwriter(s): Harmony Samuels; Courtney Harrell
- Producer(s): Harmony Samuels

Michelle Williams singles chronology
"If We Had Your Eyes" (2013)	"Fire" (2013)	"Say Yes" (2014)

"Fire" is a song recorded by American recording artist Michelle Williams. It serves as the second single from her fourth album Journey to Freedom.

== Critical reception ==
"Fire" received positive reviews from critics. Mike Wass of Idolator said "the slick club-banger pulses with staccato beats and intricate hooks — all while Michelle stays true to her faith on the catchy chorus: 'it feels just like fire, fire caught up in my bones, don't leave me alone'!" Wass also noted that "'Fire' could well be the first ode to Jesus that inspires listeners to drop it low since Mary Mary's 'Shackles (Praise You)'. Which is quite the feat." Timothy Yap of Hallels called the song "a creative art in itself. Weaving in some seed thoughts from 1 Peter, the Hebrew narrative of Daniel's friends in the furnace, and her own autobiography, 'Fire' is a 'must-hear.'"

== Track listing ==
"Fire" – Digital download
No.	Title	Length
1.	"Fire"	4:31

"Fire" – Digital download (Remixes)
No.	Title	Length
1.	"Fire" (CJay Swayne Remix)	5:14
2.	"Fire" (CJay Swayne Radio Mix)	4:02
3.	"Fire" (CJay Swayne Instrumental)	5:12
4.	"Fire" (Jochen Simms Remix Dub)	6:13
5.	"Fire" (Jochen Simms Vocal Remix)	5:45
6.	"Fire" (Jochen Simms Radio Edit)	3:51
7.	"Fire" (Jochen Simms Radio Edit Instrumental)	3:51
8.	"Fire" (John J-C Carr Blazin Remix)	5:04
9.	"Fire" (John J-C Carr Feel the Heat Remix)	5:34
10.	"Fire" (John J-C Carr Radio Edit)	3:10
11.	"Fire" (John J-C Carr Blazin Instrumental)	5:04
