= Believe in Me (Michelle Williams song) =

Single by Michelle Williams

from the album Journey to Freedom
- Released: February 27, 2015
- Studio: London Bridge Studios, L.A.
- Genre: Contemporary gospel; R&B
- Length: 3:07
- Label: E1 Music
- Songwriter(s): Michelle Williams; Carmen Reece; Al Sherrod Lambert; Harmony Samuels
- Producer(s): Harmony Samuels

Michelle Williams singles chronology
"Say Yes" (2014)	"Believe in Me" (2015)	"Fearless" (2019)

"Believe in Me" is a song recorded by American recording artist Michelle Williams from her fourth studio album Journey to Freedom (2014). It was written by Michelle Williams, Carmen Reece, Al Sherrod Lambert and Harmony Samuels who also produced it, and was released by E1 Music on February 27, 2015.

== Background ==
"Believe in Me" is the fourth single from Journey to Freedom. The Christian Post described the song as 'the most personal on her record', writing '[Williams] described penning "Believe in Me," the song she most connects with on her album'. "People might tell you 'oh my gosh you're great, you have a great calling on your life,' or 'Oh your hair is so pretty today'" Williams told CP. "...If I come to you and give you a compliment, it probably should be confirmation of what you already know. I just did not believe, I didn't think I was as good as other people around me."

The song was originally going to feature Kelly Rowland and Beyoncé, but they decided to feature on "Say Yes" instead. Williams' executive producer Phil Thornton spoke about the feature in a 2016 Centric documentary: "We were in the final stages of recording 'Journey To Freedom' and Michelle and I talked about having Kelly and Beyoncé join her on a track. And we narrowed it down to two songs on the album. One of the songs was 'Believe In Me' and the other one was 'Say Yes'.". Michelle added: "And I actually wanted Beyoncé and Kelly to be on another song on my album, but when they heard 'When Jesus Say Yes' they were like 'Michelle this sounds something like we could rock.'".

Williams performed the song at a post Stellar Award celebration hosted by E1 Music on Saturday March 28.

== Music video ==
A music video for "Believe in Me" was released on April 29, 2015. Premiering on VH1 Soul and VH1.com, the video was Williams' second to be directed by Matthew A. Cherry who also directed the Stellar Award-winning "Say Yes". Proceeding the release, Williams held a fan competition requesting fans to submit videos of themselves for inclusion in the music video. Her website read, 'If your video is selected we are going to edit a clip of your submission together along with other fan submitted videos along with Michelle singing the song in a similar way to create an official music video for the record (ala Pharrell – Happy or Nickelback – Rockstar)'
