= Journey to Freedom (album) =

Studio album by Michelle Williams
- Released: September 9, 2014
- Recorded: 2012–2014
- Studios: London Bridge, Los Angeles
- Genres: Contemporary gospel; R&B
- Length: 49:26
- Labels: E1 Music; Light
- Producer: Harmony Samuels

Michelle Williams chronology
Unexpected (2008)	Journey to Freedom (2014)

Singles from Journey to Freedom
- 1. "If We Had Your Eyes" Released: June 24, 2013; 2. "Fire" Released: September 24, 2013; 3. "If We Had Your Eyes (remix)" Released: November 4, 2013; 4. "Say Yes" Released: June 2, 2014; 5. "Believe in Me" Released: February 27, 2015

Journey to Freedom is the fourth studio album by American recording artist Michelle Williams, released on September 9, 2014, by E1 Music and Light Records. It marked her first release under the label after severing professional ties with longtime record company Columbia Records and manager Mathew Knowles in 2009. Following a hiatus from her recording career, Williams' album, a collaboration with main producer Harmony Samuels, was a fusion of both urban contemporary gospel and R&B sounds.

Released to critical acclaim, Journey to Freedom is ranked as the number-one, best gospel album of 2014 by Jubilee Cast. It is Williams' highest-charting album on the US Billboard 200, where it debuted in the top 30 and her second album to reach number two on the US Top Gospel Albums chart, where it is ranked by Billboard as one of the top 20 gospel albums of 2014.

The album was preceded by the release of the lead single, "If We Had Your Eyes" which peaked in the top 20 of the US Adult R&B Songs chart. A third single, "Say Yes", reunited Williams with her former Destiny's Child bandmates Beyoncé Knowles and Kelly Rowland and peaked at number one on the Billboard Hot Gospel Songs chart for seven weeks. "Say Yes" was awarded Song of the Year at the 2014 Gospel Touch Music Awards and Music Video of the Year at the 2015 Stellar Awards, where Williams, Beyoncé Knowles and Kelly Rowland performed the song live. To further promote the album, Williams went on a tour in the United States. The album was nominated for Outstanding Gospel Album (Traditional or Contemporary) at the 46th NAACP Image Awards and earned Williams four nominations at the 30th annual Stellar Awards.

== Background ==
In October 2008, Williams released her third studio album Unexpected, her first release since the disbanding of Destiny's Child. A breakaway from her previous solo efforts, gospel albums Heart to Yours (2002) and Do You Know (2004), the dance-pop-R&B album gained generally favorable reviews from critics, but became a moderate seller. Meanwhile, lead single "We Break the Dawn" and follow-up "The Greatest" became number-one hits on the US dance and dance airplay charts, though plans for a reissue of the album failed to materialize. In July 2009, Williams began a limited six-week engagement at the Cambridge Theatre in Chicago, making her the first African-American to be cast in the West End production of the musical. Her run was extended and Williams continued appearing for three additional weeks for an extended engagement through September 2009.

In January 2010, Michelle announced that she had parted ways with manager Mathew Knowles and Music World Entertainment. The following months, Williams made a return to Broadway by commencing a seven-week limited engagement in Chicago at the New York Ambassador Theatre, and in August, she joined the eighth series of British television show Strictly Come Dancing. In 2012, her collaboration with Ultra Naté, "Waiting On You" became her third top 20 hit on the US Dance Club Play chart.

On June 7, 2012, it was announced that Williams had been signed to Light Records and was due to release her fourth studio album in 2013. On January 3, 2013, it was announced that Williams would play Sandra in the national tour of the Tony-nominated musical Fela!, beginning January 29 in Washington, D.C. and playing in a total of 16 cities. On February 3, 2013, Williams performed at the Super Bowl XLVII halftime show, alongside Beyoncé and Kelly Rowland.

== Music and lyrics ==
"Fire" contains a biblical reference to Shadrach, Meshack, and Abednego, 'over a booming, midtempo track' which 'offers a great message of overcoming trials'.

== Release and promotion ==
=== Singles ===
"If We Had Your Eyes" was digitally released worldwide as the lead single from Journey to Freedom on June 24, 2013. Fantasia Barrino features on the official remix which was released November 4, 2013. The song peaked on the US Adult R&B Songs chart at number 19 and the US Hot Gospel Songs chart at number 22. On September 3, 2013, a Derek Blanks-directed music video was premiered via YouTube and features appearances from the song's producer, Harmony Samuels and also former Destiny's Child member, LeToya Luckett.

"Fire", produced by Harmony Samuels, was digitally released worldwide as the second single on September 24, 2013. Williams recorded an acoustic live performance for Yahoo! Music. The music video premiered via YouTube on May 10, 2014, directed by Derek Blanks. Billy Johnson Jr. of Rolling Stone described the video as 'scorching in the vein of the Ohio Players's “Fire” album cover, except that Williams is, ahem, clothed. Williams looks flawless against the flame inducing red, orange, and yellow filters, backdrops, and lighting, leaving computer screens smoking.'

"Say Yes" featuring former Destiny's Child bandmates Beyoncé and Kelly Rowland was released as the third single on June 2, 2014. Although not a Destiny's Child song, "Say Yes" is the first song released as a single including all three former members since the group's disbandment in 2005. An accompanying music video was released on June 18, 2014. The music video for "Say Yes" was directed by Matthew A. Cherry and was filmed on May 20, 2014.

"Say Yes" peaked at number one on the US Hot Gospel Songs chart for seven non-consecutive weeks, number 9 on the Bubbling Under Hot 100 and number 14 on the US Heatseekers Songs chart. It also appeared on several Billboard year-end charts between 2014 and 2015 and in 2019 was ranked as one of the top 50 gospel songs of the decade. On the 2014 year-end charts, "Say Yes" was ranked number 7 on US Gospel Songs, number 19 on US Gospel Airplay, number 11 on US Gospel Digital Songs and number 4 on US Gospel Streaming Songs. In 2015, "Say Yes" was ranked number 23 on the top US Hot Gospel Songs year-end chart. In 2019, Billboard ranked "Say Yes" at number 50 on the decade-end 2010-2019 US Hot Gospel Songs chart. Internationally "Say Yes" charted in Belgium, France, Netherlands and the UK; where it peaked at number 15 on the UK R&B Chart and number 8 on the UK Indie Chart. The music video was awarded Music Video of the Year at the 2015 Stellar Awards, where Williams performed the song live with Beyoncé & Kelly Rowland. Their live performance was released as a single on April 15, 2015.

In the UK, the album track "Need Your Help" peaked at number-one on the weekly Cross Rhythms chart and ranked at number 58 on their year-end Top 100 Chart for 2015.

== Critical reception ==
Professional ratings
Review scores
Source	Rating
AllMusic	4/5 stars
CCM Magazine	4/5 stars
Cross Rhythms	8/10 squares
GospelPundit	4/5 stars
Hallels	(Positive)
Idolator	4/5 stars
Middlechild Promotions	4.5/5 stars
Soul Tracks	('Recommended')
Yada Mag	4/5 stars

Journey To Freedom received highly positive reviews from music critics. Andy Kellman of AllMusic wrote 'this is among Williams' best work, highlighted by "Need Your Help," "Fire," and "If We Had Your Eyes."' Peggy Oliver for Soul Tracks expressed similarly, writing Journey to Freedom 'is by far Williams’ best body of work, a personal cleansing that further amplifies her dexterity with multiple genres. Michelle Williams’ half-dozen year hiatus away from the studio has served its purpose: she has emerged as an artist clearly traveling on her own artistic road to freedom, and delivering an album that was well worth the wait.' Mike Wass of Idolator complimented the production, praising the mix between R&B and Gospel noting 'Journey To Freedom is the perfect bridge between the singer’s gospel and secular output. By focusing on universal themes (love, hope and inner strength) and exploring new genres, Michelle has created something both inclusive and joyously experimental.' Wass also claiming Journey to Freedom is 'her best album to date.'

Timothy Yap of Hallels lent praise to the lyrical themes, writing, 'it's a theological meaty album with doses of spiritual muscle-inducing supplements derived directly from Scripture.' However, he noted 'the record is far too slanted towards having far too many mid-pacers. Songs such as "Free," "Just Like You" and "Everything" basically utilizes the same urban template effortlessly without having much time invested in developing stronger hooks making them more memorable. "Believe in Me," a smooth Diane Warren-styled R&B beat ballad, is redemptive in terms of breaking up the tempo. Nevertheless, despite the quibbles, Journey to Freedom is still one of this year's important releases. Williams could have chosen to journey the safe and money grabbing route by compromising her beliefs and Christian stance. But here she chooses to be true to her faith, her calling and her Lord; and the rewards are eternal.'

The GospelPundit praised Samuels' production and Williams' vocals writing; '[the album] is a catchy collection of upbeat music that promises a party, while inspiring and encouraging listeners. The Samuels Nigerian heritage provides a rich musical backdrop of African-influenced beats and chants, while his proven success in mainstream music (Chris Brown, J Lo, Ne-Yo and more) promises pop and urban styles that are relevant to a broad marketplace of music lovers. Michelle Williams tops it all off with vocals that range from pop to passionate, simple to soaring, all the while staying true to her own voice and vibe.' RoJay of Middlechild Promotions lauded the Williams' vocal performance 'although still criminally underrated as a vocalist, Michelle Williams takes control of her destiny once again and delivers another solid solo album where she gets to showcase the side of her personality that makes her as genuine and true to her art as her peers.'

=== Accolades ===
A summary of accolades by publication and rank
Publication	Accolade	Rank	Ref.
Jubilee Cast	Best Gospel Albums of 2014	1	

== Commercial performance ==
Journey to Freedom debuted at number 29 on the US Billboard 200, Williams' highest appearance to date. It became her second debut at number two on the Top Gospel Albums chart — following Do You Know (2004) — peaking behind Lecrae's Anomaly. Journey to Freedom also debuted at number 7 on the US Independent Albums chart and number 6 on the UK Christian & Gospel Albums chart.

Journey to Freedom spent a total of 30 weeks on the US Top Gospel Albums chart, making it her second longest-appearing album on the chart, following her debut album Heart to Yours (2002) which spent a total of 46 weeks on the chart. Billboard ranked the album at number 20 on the 2014 year-end chart, which lists the year's top 50 best-performing albums on the US Top Gospel Albums chart. Furthermore, Billboard ranked Williams as the 13th Top Gospel Artist of 2014 and 5th Top Gospel Artist - Female of 2014.

== Track listing ==
No.	Title	Writer(s)	Length
1.	"Need Your Help" (featuring Eric Dawkins)	Harmony Samuels; Michelle Williams; Lonny Bereal	4:25
2.	"Yes"	Samuels; Al Sherrod Lambert; David Brown	3:37
3.	"Everything"	Samuels; Lambert; Brown; Williams	4:01
4.	"Fall" (featuring Lecrae and Tye Tribbett)	Samuels; Lambert; Bereal; Lecrae Moore	4:41
5.	"Fire"	Samuels; Courtney Harrell	4:31
6.	"Free"	Samuels; Lambert; Bereal; Williams; Brown	4:08
7.	"Just Like You" (featuring Chief Wakil)	Samuels; Harrell	3:58
8.	"Beautiful"	Samuels; Harrell	4:17
9.	"Believe in Me"	Samuels; Lambert; Williams; Carmen Reece	3:07
10.	"In the Morning"	Samuels; Harrell	3:45
11.	"If We Had Your Eyes" (featuring Fantasia)	Samuels; Lambert; Harrell	4:34
12.	"Say Yes" (featuring Beyoncé and Kelly Rowland)	Samuels; Lambert; Williams; Reece	4:12
Total length:			49:26

Japanese edition
No.	Title	Length
13.	"Say Yes" (Jochen Simms radio edit) (featuring Beyoncé and Kelly Rowland)	3:26
14.	"Say Yes" (John J-C Carr remix) (featuring Beyoncé and Kelly Rowland))	5:56
Total length:		58:48

Walmart exclusive edition (bonus DVD)
No.	Title	Director(s)	Length
1.	"Say Yes" (behind the scenes)		1:33
2.	"Say Yes" (music video)	Matthew A. Cherry	4:22
3.	"Say Yes" (lyric video)		4:13
4.	"Fire" (behind the scenes)		2:07
5.	"Fire" (music video)	Harmony Samuels	3:50
6.	"If We Had Your Eyes" (behind the scenes)		2:22
7.	"If We Had Your Eyes" (music video)	Harmony Samuels	4:42
8.	"behind the scenes" (In the studio)

== Personnel ==
- Jose Cardoza – engineering, recording and mixing
- Carlos King – engineering, recording and mixing
- Dave Kutch – mastering
- Derek Blanks – photography, art direction and design
- Kim Kimble – hair
- Latasha Wright – makeup
- Jason Bolin – wardrobe
- Agate Adorned – jewellery
- Joe "Flip" Wilson – A&R
- Steve "Supe" White – A&R
- Phil "Phillionaire" Thornton – marketing
- W&W Public Relations – publicity
- Holly Carter (Relevé Entertainment) – management
- Jonathan Azu (Red Light Entertainment) – management

== Charts ==
=== Weekly charts ===
Chart (2014)	Peak position
UK Christian & Gospel Albums (OCC)	6
US Billboard 200	29
US Independent Albums (Billboard)	7
US Top Gospel Albums (Billboard)	2

=== Year-end charts ===
Chart (2014)	Position
US Top Gospel Albums (Billboard)	20

== Awards and nominations ==
Year	Category	Nominated	Result	Ref.
BET Awards
2015	Best Gospel Artist	Michelle Williams	Nominated	
Gospel Touch Music Awards
2014	Song of the Year	"Say Yes"	Won	
NAACP Image Awards
2014	Outstanding Gospel Album (Traditional or Contemporary)	Journey to Freedom	Nominated	
Soul Train Music Awards
2014	Best Gospel/Inspirational Song	"Say Yes"	Nominated	
Stellar Awards
2015	Female Vocalist of the Year	Michelle Williams	Nominated	
2015	Song of the Year	"Say Yes"	Nominated	
2015	Urban/Inspirational/Instrumental Single/Performance of the Year	"Say Yes"	Nominated	
2015	Music Video of the Year	"Say Yes"	Won	
