= Kierra (album) =

Studio album by Kierra Sheard
- Released: April 17, 2020
- Recorded: 2019–2020
- Genre: Christian; R&B
- Length: 63:58
- Label: Karew; RCA Inspiration
- Producer: Edgar "JV" Etienne; Harmony Samuels; J. Drew Sheard II; Sir the Baptist

Kierra Sheard chronology
Graceland (2014)	Kierra (2020)

Kierra is the sixth studio album by American singer Kierra Sheard. It was released by Karew Records and RCA Inspiration on April 17, 2020. Sheard is Also nominated for a Grammy award at the 2021 ceremony.

== Critical reception ==
Allmusic editor Marcy Donelson found that Kierra "is an effervescent one, filled with exuberant, urban-influenced gospel tunes [...] Songs called "Beautiful," "Grateful," and "BIG BIG BIG" capture the uplifting spirit of the album, which closes with "So into You," featuring Sheard's nephew Jacob Sheard."

== Track listing ==
No.	Title	Writer(s)	Producer(s)	Length
1.	"Don't Judge Me" (featuring Missy Elliott)	Edgar "JV" Etienne; Harmony "H-Money" Samuels; Kierra Sheard; Melissa Elliott; Varren Wade	Samuels; Etienne^{[a]}	3:23
2.	"Always Win" (Live)	J. Drew Sheard II; K. Sheard	J. Sheard	4:25
3.	"Better"	J. Sheard; K. Sheard; Justin Brooks	J. Sheard	3:20
4.	"Follow" (Live) (featuring Todd Dulaney)	J. Sheard; K. Sheard; Brooks; Dulaney	J. Sheard	5:41
5.	"It Keeps Happening" (Live)	J. Sheard; K. Sheard	J. Sheard	5:32
6.	"Human"	Etienne; Samuels; K. Sheard; Wade	Samuels; Etienne^{[a]}	2:49
7.	"Something Has to Break" (Live) (featuring Tasha Cobbs Leonard)	J. Sheard; Jonathan Smith; K. Sheard; Mia Fieldes	J. Sheard	6:42
8.	"Grateful"	Etienne; Samuels; K. Sheard; Ryan Toby; Wade	Samuels; Etienne^{[a]}	3:29
9.	"Beautiful"	Etienne; Samuels; K. Sheard	Samuels; Etienne^{[a]}	4:01
10.	"I Choose You" (Live)	J. Sheard; K. Sheard; Brooks	J. Sheard	4:07
11.	"Things You Do"	Etienne; Samuels; K. Sheard; Wade	Samuels; Etienne^{[a]}	2:46
12.	"My Redeemer" (Live) (featuring Le'Andria Johnson)	Elbernita "Twinkie" Clark	J. Sheard	6:42
13.	"Sunday Flow" (featuring Sir the Baptist)	K. Sheard; William James Stokes	Sir the Baptist	3:41
14.	"BIG BIG BIG" (Live)	J. Sheard; K. Sheard	J. Sheard	3:38
15.	"So Into You" (Live)	J. Sheard; K. Sheard; Brooks	J. Sheard	3:44

Notes

- ^{^[a]} signifies a co-producer

== Charts ==
=== Weekly charts ===
Chart (2020)	Peak position
US Billboard 200	188
US Top Gospel Albums (Billboard)	1

=== Year-end charts ===
Chart (2020)	Position
US Top Gospel Albums (Billboard)	10
