= Say Yes (Michelle Williams song) =

Single by Michelle Williams featuring Beyoncé and Kelly Rowland

from the album Journey to Freedom
- Released: June 2, 2014
- Recorded: 2014
- Studio: London Bridge Studios, L.A.
- Genre: Afrobeats; gospel; R&B
- Label: E1 Music
- Songwriters: Michelle Williams; Carmen Reece; Al Sherrod Lambert; Harmony Samuels
- Producer: Harmony Samuels

Michelle Williams singles chronology
"Fire" (2013)	"Say Yes" (2014)	"Believe in Me" (2015)

Beyoncé singles chronology
"Partition" (2014)	"Say Yes" (2014)	"Pretty Hurts" (2014)

Kelly Rowland singles chronology
"Love & Sex, Pt. 2" (2014)	"Say Yes" (2014)	"I Know What You Did Last Summer" (2015)

Music video
- "Say Yes" on YouTube

"Say Yes" is a song by American singer Michelle Williams, taken from her fourth studio album Journey to Freedom (2014). It features Williams' former Destiny's Child groupmates Beyoncé and Kelly Rowland. The song was written by Williams, Carmen Reece, Al Sherrod Lambert and Harmony Samuels who also produced it. E1 Music released "Say Yes" as the album's third single on June 2, 2014. "Say Yes" marks the third time the trio collaborated as solo artists following the disbandment of their group in 2006.

Musically, "Say Yes" is an uptempo gospel and pop song, which takes influence from dance music. It interpolates a popular Nigerian gospel tune originally titled "When Jesus Says Yes", believed to be originally sung by artist Agatha Moses. Upon release, "Say Yes" received universal acclaim from contemporary music critics who called the song infectious and praised its catchiness. Commercially the song performed well on the gospel charts in the US, peaking at number one for seven non-consecutive weeks on the Billboard Hot Gospel Songs. It also appeared on charts in the UK, France and Belgium across Europe. "Say Yes" appeared seventh on the 2014 year-end Hot Gospel Songs chart and twenty-three on the 2015 year-end chart. In 2019, Billboard ranked "Say Yes" number fifty on the decade-end (2010-2019) Hot Gospel Songs chart.

An accompanying music video for "Say Yes" was directed by Matthew A. Cherry. It was released on June 18, 2014 when Williams appeared on Good Morning America. The clip depicts the three singers at a street party, dancing and singing with a crowd; along with solo appearances of each singer in a forest, wearing white clothes during their respective verses. It received generally positive reviews from critics who accredited it as a reunion of Destiny's Child and praised its feel-good nature. In 2015, the video won a Stellar Award for Music Video of the Year.

== Background and release ==
"Say Yes" was written by Williams, Carmen Reece, Al Sherrod Lambert and Harmony Samuels who also served as its producer. The song marked the third collaboration of the trio consisting of Williams, Beyoncé and Kelly Rowland, after their group Destiny's Child disbanded in 2006. Kelly Rowland and Beyoncé had initially been planned to be featured on "Believe In Me", but they decided to feature on "Say Yes" instead. Williams' executive producer Phil Thornton spoke about the feature in a 2016 Centric documentary: "We were in the final stages of recording 'Journey To Freedom' and Michelle and I talked about having Kelly and Beyoncé join her on a track. And we narrowed it down to two songs on the album. One of the songs was 'Believe In Me' and the other one was 'Say Yes'.". Michelle added: "And I actually wanted Beyoncé and Kelly to be on another song on my album, but when they heard 'When Jesus Say Yes' they were like 'Michelle this sounds something like we could rock.'".

Williams sent an advanced demo of the album Journey to Freedom to her former bandmates Beyoncé and Rowland which contained the song as a solo track titled "When Jesus Says Yes". Later, Williams received a call from Rowland who said, "We love 'When Jesus Says Yes'... there has to be a Destiny's Child mix of the song." Both Rowland and Beyoncé recorded their respective verses in a studio afterwards. Williams stated she wanted to keep the project in secrecy "until it was time" to reveal it. During an interview with Rap-Up, Beyoncé spoke about her decision to be a featured artist on the song, stating, "This song is so inspiring and... not enough music out there like this and I'm proud to be a part of it." Williams talked about "Say Yes" with Fuse, saying,

"It's an inspirational song, so I wasn't sure how people would take to it. But it kind of reminds me of praying [in] that it continues to have the impact, and does have the impact, of when Kanye West did 'Jesus Walks.' I think I got one here."

"Say Yes" was leaked onto the Internet on May 21, 2014. Williams revealed on her Twitter account the same day that the leaked track was an unmixed and unmastered version of "Say Yes". In an interview with The Hollywood Reporter, she said that she "hated" the fact that an unfinished version was released although noted that she was not angry and felt "overwhelmed" by the positive support. Prior to the song's debut, several publications reported that Beyoncé's sister, Solange Knowles, also appeared as a featured artist in "Say Yes"; however, the claims were later proved to be wrong. A final official version of the song premiered on June 2, 2014 and was released to radio and made available for digital download the same day. On the German web show MalcolmMusic, Williams performed a German version of the song with host and journalist Malcolm Ohanwe.

== Composition ==
"Say Yes"
A 24-second excerpt from the chorus of "Say Yes", a song which samples a Nigerian gospel tune, "When Jesus Says Yes" and was described as its dance rework.

"Say Yes" is an uptempo gospel song with elements of pop music. The song was also noted for exploring elements of Contemporary Christian as well as electronic dance music. Jeff Benjamin of Fuse felt that the song contained a "zippy", reggae-dance beat. Its instrumentation includes percussion instruments, synths and horn stabs along with African beats. According to sheet music published on the website Musicnotes.com by Kobalt Music Publishing America, Inc., "Say Yes" is written in the key of D♭ major using common time. It contains a moderately fast tempo with a metronome of 120 beats per minute and the singers' vocal elements range from the low note of A♭_{3} to the high note of F_{5}. The song samples a popular Nigerian gospel tune originally titled "When Jesus Says Yes". Chris Payne and Colin Stutz of Billboard magazine described it as a modern dance and contemporary electronic dance reworking of that song. Stutz also found elements of an "upbeat swing" of West African gospel. Regarding the composition of the song, Williams stated, "It is a song that came from Africa more than a hundred years ago. I don't think anyone knows who wrote it or who started singing that chorus. When the song leaked last week, so many people from Africa and Nigeria were trying to let me know where it came from."

Williams sings the lead vocals while Beyoncé and Rowland sing their respective solo verses and serve as background vocalists throughout the song. Eric Corpus from The Christian Post interpreted the song's lyrics as a praise of God's sovereignty and "magnetism" of Jesus' love. "Say Yes" opens with a message of faith as Williams sings the first lines, "I'm not worried about a thing/'Cause I know you are guiding me / Where you lead me / Lord I will go / I have not fear / 'Cause I know who's in control." The chorus is constructed as a call and response with the trio repeatedly praising Jesus through the lines "When Jesus say yes, nobody can say no!" while being backed by a choir which repeats the verses.

== Critical reception ==
"Say Yes" received critical acclaim. Colin Stutz of Billboard described "Say Yes" as a "peppy" number. John Walker of MTV News described the song's refrain as "infectious". Mike Wass from Idolator praised the song's catchiness, describing it as an "infectious gospel club-banger" and an invitation to the dance floor for listeners. Further, he called it "possibly the first twerk-inducing song of praise". He concluded his review, writing, "those harmonies remain unrivaled and the chorus is a monster. Trust me, [its chorus] will be stuck in your head after the first listen." In another review he felt that the song managed to bridge the gap between gospel and popular music. Describing the song as "kinetic", Marc Hogan of Spin magazine called it "not only star-studded, but damn near impossible to get out of your head, too". Rolling Stone writer Jon Blistein described the horn stabs as "heavenly" and praised the trio's "always potent harmonies".

Yahoo! Music writer Billy Johnson, Jr. found a "vibrant dance energy" in the song's music and further hailed its message as "uplifting". Similarly, Complex writer Zach Frydenlund echoed his statements, describing the song as "uplifting". In a review for Fuse, Jeff Benjamin described "Say Yes" as a "gospel-island hybrid". He felt that it was interesting to hear Williams as the lead vocalist instead of Beyoncé, who had previously served as the lead vocalist of Destiny's Child. Benhamin finished his review, concluding, "It all sort of makes us want to twerk and throw our hands to heavens at the same time." Brownie Marie of Christian Today praised Williams' vocal performance during the song's hook, along with the "well-controlled riffs". She also wrote that Beyoncé is "vocally subdued on the track, and truly lets Williams' voice receive the attention". Hayen Manders from Refinery29 felt that the song was Williams' "turn to shine". In a more mixed review, Vulture columnist Lindsey Weber wrote that the song is not "a total mess" and that listeners might sing the praises in the song along with it.

At the 2014 Soul Train Music Awards, "Say Yes" was nominated in the category for Best Gospel/Inspirational Song. "Say Yes" also received 3 nominations at the 2015 Stellar Awards for Song of the Year, Urban/Inspirational/Instrumental Single/Performance of the Year and Music Video of the Year; where Williams was further nominated for Female Vocalist of the Year.

== Chart performance ==
In the United States, following its premiere "Say Yes" peaked at number nineteen on the US Billboard Twitter Top Tracks chart. Following its release, "Say Yes" entered the top ten of the Billboard Hot Gospel Songs chart at number five in its second week of charting on the issue dated June 21, 2014 while also charting at numbers one and four on the Gospel Digital Songs and Gospel Streaming Songs charts respectively, the latter also being its debut position. On the issue dated July 5, the song jumped from the position of nine to the top of the Hot Gospel Songs chart, while also reaching the number one spot on the Gospel Streaming Songs and Gospel Digital Songs, with 1.2 million streams for the week (placing just outside the 100 most-streamed songs among all formats). With that feat, it became Williams' first number-one single on the Hot Gospel Songs, spending 2 consecutive weeks at the top of the chart and 4 weeks at number-one on the Gospel Digital Songs chart. In its twenty-fourth week of charting on Hot Gospel Songs, "Say Yes" returned to number one, on the issue dated November 22, 2014, remaining there for five consecutive weeks, giving it a total of seven non-consecutive weeks at number one. In the Billboard issue dated April 18, 2015, "Say Yes" rose from number ten to number two on Gospel Digital Songs, with 3,000 sold in the week, a 233 percent sales gain, following the April 5th airing of the Stellar Awards.

On the Bubbling Under Hot 100 Singles chart, which acts as a 25-song extension of the main Billboard Hot 100, "Say Yes" peaked at number nine. It also peaked at number 14 on the Billboard component Heatseekers Songs chart. Luis Gomez in an article for the Chicago Tribune opined that the song's religious message was the reason for its mild reception and performance on the mainstream charts.

In the United Kingdom, "Say Yes" debuted and peaked on the UK Singles Chart and the component UK R&B Chart at numbers 106 and 15 respectively on June 14, 2014. The song performed better on the country's UK Indie Chart where it peaked at the eighth position in its first week. In France, Williams achieved her first solo single on the French Singles Chart when the track debuted at number 161 in the first week of charting on June 14, 2014. The following week, it fell off the chart, but re-entered at its peak position of 90 on June 28. It fell down to the position of 155 the next week and completely dropped out afterwards. Elsewhere, it charted for five weeks on the Flanders version of the Belgian Urban Singles Chart where it peaked at number 28 on June 14, 2014.

== Music video ==
=== Background and synopsis ===
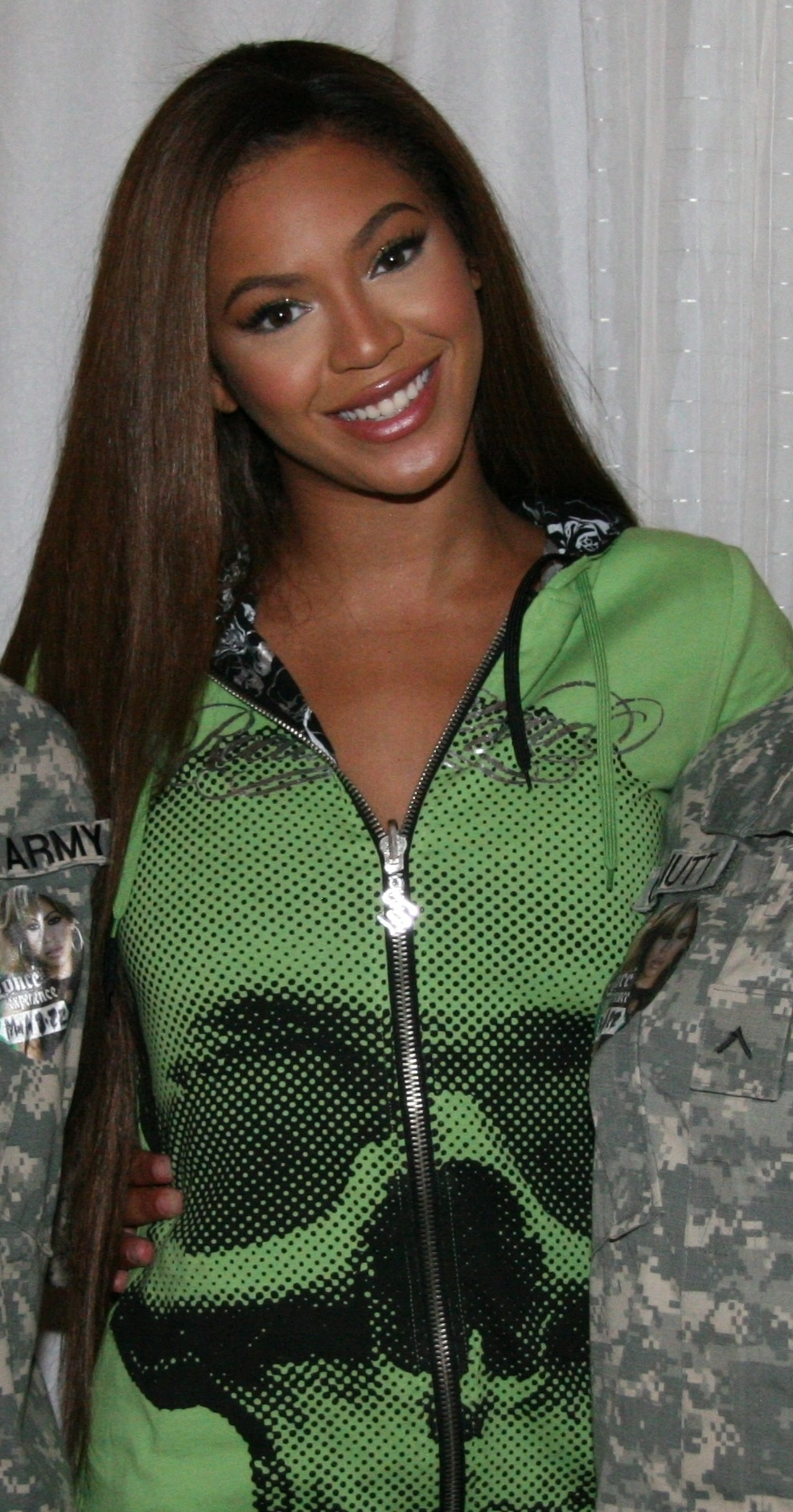
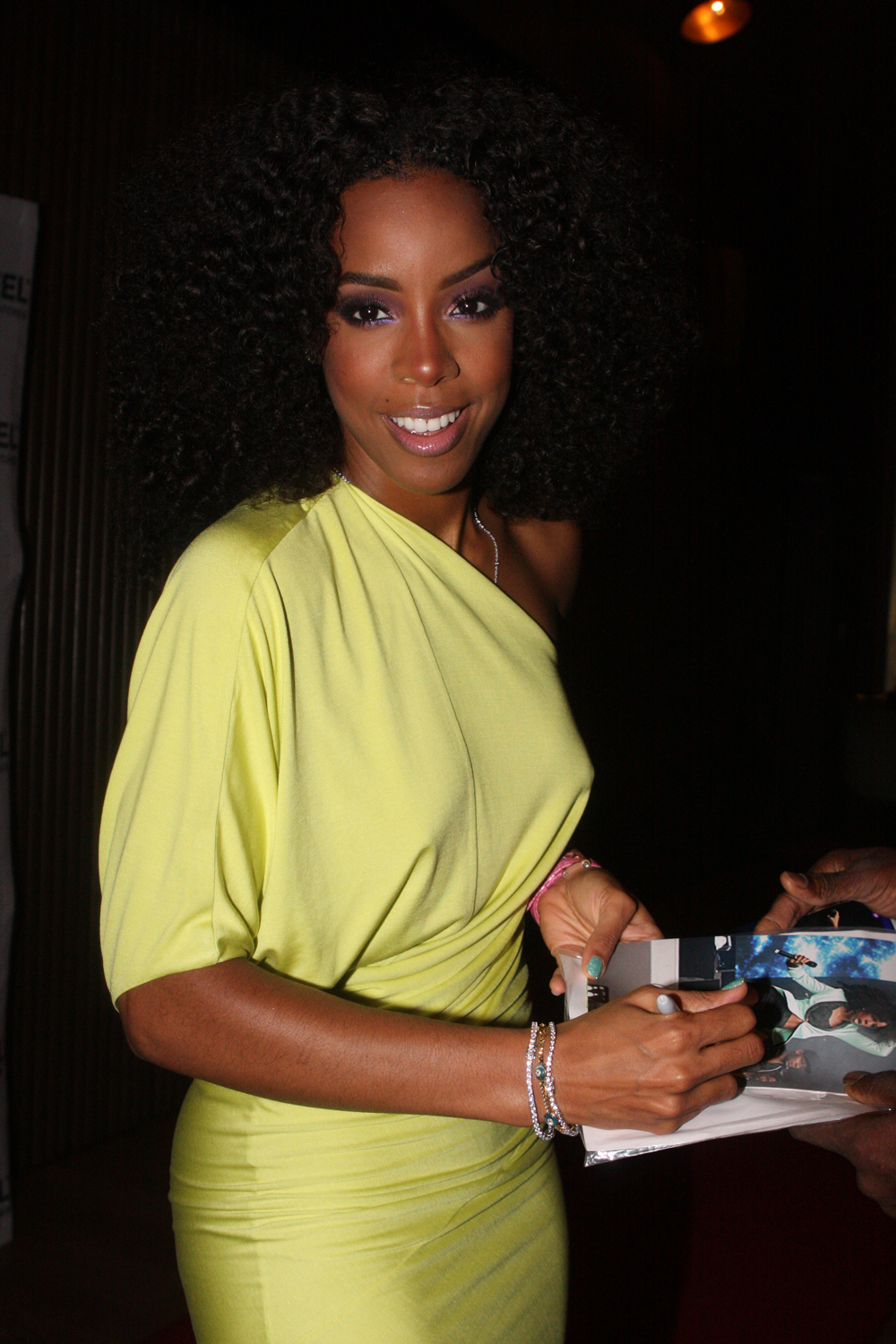
Beyoncé (left) and Kelly Rowland (right) who served as featured artists in the song, also appeared in its music video.

The music video for "Say Yes" was filmed on May 20, 2014 and directed by Matthew A. Cherry. The clip was filmed in a house in Maplewood, New Jersey, where a crowd gathered the watch the trio on set. Following that, filming was cordoned by local police. Several pictures of Beyoncé arriving on set were shared on social networks by fans. Williams debuted the clip for "Say Yes" on her appearance at Good Morning America on June 18, 2014. Regarding the filming of the video, she stated, "Sometimes the director or production assistants had to say like, 'OK, girls, bring it back home. Bring it back together because when we were together, we go back to how we were when we were younger, just always laughing and talking about things. It's been a great moment." The video was released on Williams' Vevo account the same day. A behind-the-scenes footage was also released featuring the trio on set and talking about the song and their reunion. In the clip, Williams said she felt excited that she had her "sisters" with her spreading a positive message for the world.

The video opens with Williams singing the opening verses and dancing on a street. Beyoncé, wearing an apostolic-like gown to fit the theme of the track, appears at 90 seconds into the song to deliver her verse in a forest in front of a tree hung with paper lanterns. Rowland appears soon after in the same forest wearing a white crop top, smiling. The singers appear together in the video's last section when Williams, Beyoncé and Rowland sing and dance together at a street-party scene along with dancers who are shown waving their flags and playing drums. The choreography present in the video was noted to be traditional African.

=== Reception ===
The video received generally favorable reviews. Daniel Kreps from Rolling Stone said that it managed to highlight the "'feel-good' vibes" without using "heavy-handed" religious iconography. He further praised the reunion of Destiny's Child. Tom Breihan of Stereogum said that each singer looked "seriously happy", further praising Beyoncé's style as reminiscent of the Destiny's Child-era. Writing for People, Zakiya Yamal opined that the traditional choreography and drums were inspired by Africa. Yamal further praised the singers' synchronized "formidable moves, reminding everyone they've still got it". Chiderah Monde from the New York Daily News felt that the dance sequence during the end of the video was similar to older videos by Destiny's Child. Alex Rees from Cosmopolitan stated that a reunion of the group was "always good fun". He also noted that the clip featured Williams dancing in the center spot between Beyoncé and Rowland for the first time. Mike Wass from Idolator described the video as "heavenly" and concluded that it was "heart-warming" to see Williams have her moment. Wass went on to describe the clip as a "visual extravaganza" and praised Beyoncé's look.

Mike Ayers of Fuse, described the visual as "uplifting", adding that it included numerous "sun-soaked" shots of the singers. John Walker of MTV News described the "glorious", fun clip as "the Destiny's Child reunion of your dreams". Similarly, Zach Frydenlund from Complex wrote that he had a "great time" watching and remembering his "favorite Destiny's Child moments". Samantha Grossman of Time magazine praised the fact that the group reunited for a music video, linking it to the times when they were part of Destiny's Child. Billboard's Chris Payne described the clip as "jubilant" and felt that when the singers are seen dancing on the set together, "[it] is absolutely heartwarming". Writing for Essence, Dominique Hobdy felt that the trio was "all smiles as they sing about who's really in charge". Chris Coplan from Consequence of Sound praised the clip's positive energy as "[b]right and shimmery" comparing it with "forget the world and just dance" clips from the early '90s. Brett Malec from E! Online described it as "[i]nspirational". Hayden Manders from Refinery29 praised Williams' look and stated that "the three women look like they're having a blast". Mikael Wood from Los Angeles Times found the choreography performed by the trio to be "light" and described the clip as "pretty festive".

The video was awarded Music Video of the Year at the 2015 Stellar Awards.

== Live performances ==
Williams performed an acoustic version of "Say Yes" at Yahoo! Music, which was released in 2014. Williams also performed the single during her set at the 2014 Essence Music Festival. Williams later performed the song together with Kelly Rowland and Beyoncé at the 2015 Stellar Awards. The recording of their performance was released as a single on April 15, 2015. On April 14, 2015, Williams performed "Say Yes" at The White House before President of the United States, Barack Obama and First Lady of the United States, Michelle Obama. The program titled, The Gospel Tradition: In Performance at the White House was broadcast on June 26, 2015, on PBS stations and simulcast on TV One. In 2022, Williams performed "Say Yes" in the Juneteenth: A Global Celebration for Freedom concert at the Hollywood Bowl, which was broadcast on CNN.

== Charts ==
=== Weekly charts ===
Chart (2014)	Peak position
Belgium (Ultratop Flanders Urban)	28
France (SNEP)	90
Netherlands (Single Top 100)	114
Suriname (Nationale Top 40)	4
UK Singles (Official Charts Company)	106
UK Hip Hop/R&B (Official Charts)	15
UK Independent (Official Charts)	8
US Bubbling Under Hot 100 (Billboard)	9
US Hot Gospel Songs (Billboard)	1
US Heatseekers Songs (Billboard)	14
Chart (2024)	Peak position
Jamaica Airplay (JAMMS)	8
Chart (2026)	Peak position
Jamaica Airplay (JAMMS)	10

=== Monthly charts ===
Chart (2019)	Peak position
UK Premier Christian Radio	16
Chart (2021)	Peak position
UK Premier Christian Radio	7
Chart (2022)	Peak position
UK Premier Christian Radio	5

=== Year-end charts ===
Chart (2014)	Position
US Hot Gospel Songs (Billboard)	7
US Gospel Airplay (Billboard)	19
US Gospel Digital Songs (Billboard)	11
US Gospel Streaming Songs (Billboard)	4
Chart (2015)	Position
US Hot Gospel Songs (Billboard)	23
US Gospel Digital Songs (Billboard)	11

=== Decade-end charts ===
Chart (2010–2019)	Position
US Hot Gospel Songs (Billboard)	50
