= The Best Man Holiday (soundtrack) =

The Best Man Holiday: Original Motion Picture Soundtrack

Soundtrack album by Various artists
- Released: October 25, 2013
- Genres: Film soundtrack; Christmas music; rhythm and blues; contemporary classical
- Length: 45:45
- Label: RCA
- Producers: Malcolm D. Lee (exec.); Harmony; The Underdogs; R. Kelly; David Foster; John Legend; Jermaine Dupri; Ne-Yo; Steve Daly; Greg Pagani; Charlie Wilson

The Best Man Holiday: Original Motion Picture Soundtrack is the soundtrack to the 2013 film of the same name released by RCA Records on October 25, 2013. The album prominently featured the use of Christmas music includes songs by R. Kelly, Jordin Sparks, Mary J. Blige, Monica, Ne-Yo, Marsha Ambrosius, John Legend, Emeli Sandé, and more. It features both original as well as existing tracks. It was made accessible to stream exclusively on ITunes on October 16, 2013, even before the film's album was issued to digital music streamers and was later received a physical release on November 1.

== Background ==
Lee believed that "music is essential to the entirety of a film going experience [...] The songs listed here not only make up the fabric of the movie, but many served as inspiration to the creation of the screenplay". The creation of the soundtrack was inspired from his experiences on listening to Christmas music and thought on fitting it into the film. The soundtrack featured covers of Christmas songs performed by Stevie Wonder, Nat King Cole and Marvin Gaye. In addition to the covers, he also wrote few Christmas songs into the script while writing the film. He then made a deal with RCA Records, which assembled "a roster of artists that are just fantastic and really would do a great job helping to be the fabric of the movie".

== Reception ==
Stephen Farber of The Hollywood Reporter wrote "There's a lot of effective music in the film, though the Christmas standards on the soundtrack are overused." Andrew Barker of Variety called it as an "ace soundtrack full of soulful yuletide tunes", while Drew Taylor of IndieWire called it as "a killer soundtrack full of late-'90s party jams".

== Track listing ==
No.	Title	Performers	Length
1.	"Christmas Time to Me"	Jordin Sparks	2:53
2.	"Someday at Christmas"	Mario	3:02
3.	"What Christmas Means to Me"	Fantasia	2:24
4.	"I Still Have You"	Charlie Wilson	4:07
5.	"Christmas I'll Be Steppin'"	R. Kelly	5:26
6.	"This Christmas"	Mary J. Blige	3:18
7.	"Shelter"	John Legend	2:54
8.	"Have Yourself a Merry Little Christmas"	Monica	2:45
9.	"Winter Wonderland"	Emeli Sandé	2:21
10.	"Can You Stand the Rain"	New Edition	4:54
11.	"I Want to Come Home for Christmas"	Ne-Yo	3:44
12.	"O Holy Night"	Jayda Brown, Jasmine Watkins, Monica Calhoun	2:26
13.	"As"	Marsha Ambrosius, Anthony Hamilton	5:31

== Charts ==
Weekly charts

Chart (2013)	Peak position
US Billboard 200	23
US Top R&B/Hip-Hop Albums (Billboard)	6
US Soundtrack Albums (Billboard)	2

Year-end charts

Chart (2014)	Position
US Top R&B/Hip-Hop Albums (Billboard)	47
US Soundtrack Albums (Billboard)	16
