= Major (American musician) =

American musician (born 1984)

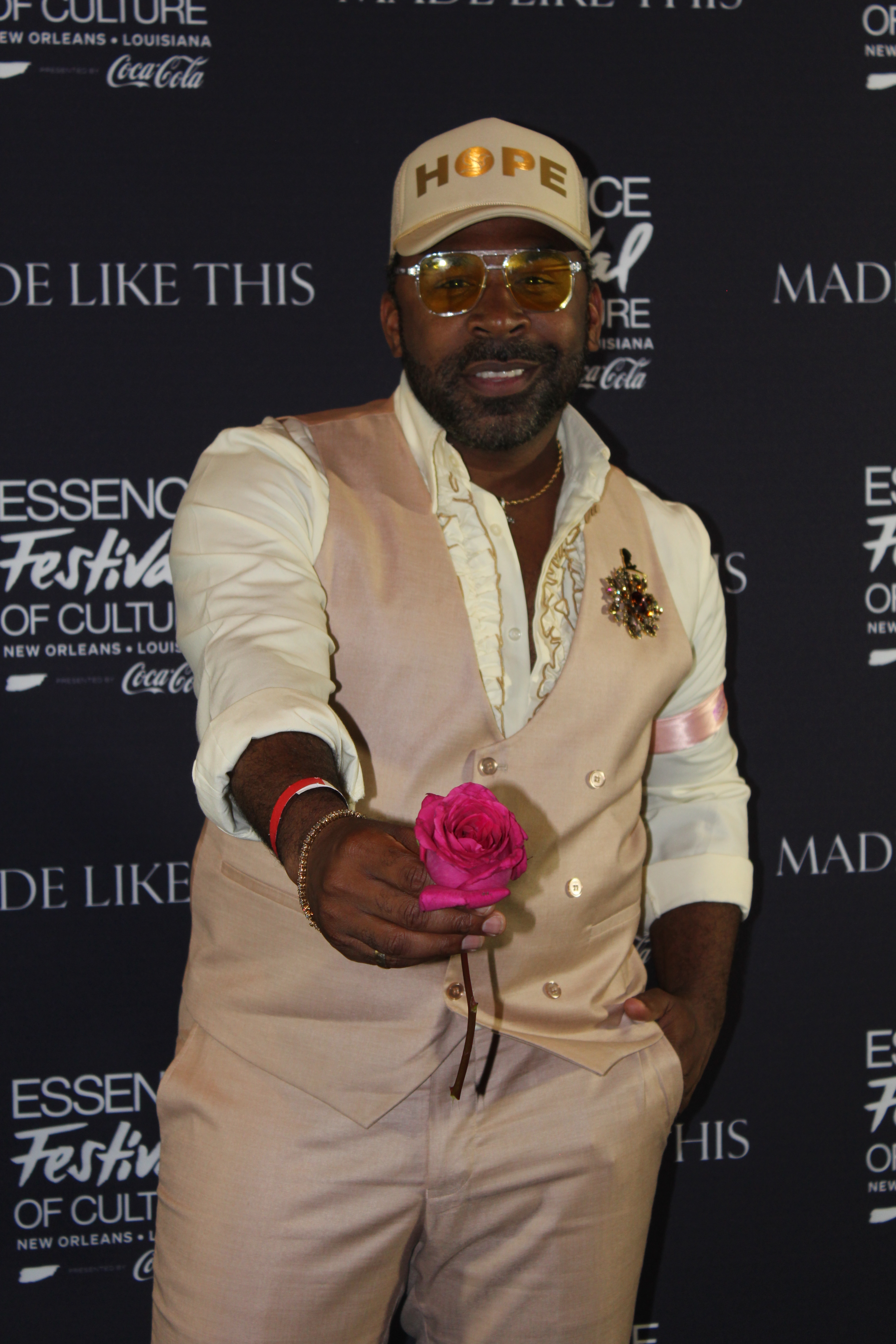
- MAJOR. on 2025 Essence Festival of Culture Carpet

Background information
- Born: Major R. Johnson Finley; March 10, 1984 (age 42); Denton, Texas, U.S.
- Genres: Soul; pop; R&B; gospel
- Occupations: singer-songwriter; vocal producer; stage performance coach
- Instrument: Vocals
- Years active: 1995–present
- Labels: BOE Music Group, EMPIRE
- Website: www.nowthatsmajor.com

Major R. Johnson Finley (born March 10, 1984), professionally known by his stage name Major (stylized as MAJOR.), is an American pop soul musician, singer, songwriter, producer, and stage performance coach. He is known for his 2016 single "Why I Love You". At the 61st Annual Grammy Awards, he received nomination for a Best Traditional R&B Performance for "Honest".

== Early life ==
Born in Denton, Texas and raised in Houston, Texas, in a blended-family household of 10 siblings (13 total), MAJOR. began making music at a young age and performed in various musical venues in his hometown and abroad throughout his childhood. He graduated from the High School for the Performing and Visual Arts, received intensive classical training from Professor Steve Smith of The Juilliard School and Houston Grand Opera High School Voice Studio. He then attended the Berklee College of Music, serving as student body president, and after graduating, moved to Los Angeles to pursue an entertainment career.

== Career ==
After parting ways with Malibu-based Star Club Entertainment where he generated viral success via YouTube, MAJOR. then entered a production/recording relationship with B.O.E. Music Group in partnership with UK producer Harmony Samuels in early 2014. MAJOR. attributes finding his truest sound to his musical partnership with Samuels.

MAJOR. is highly regarded for his live show experiences, including 2 sold-out shows at the historic Troubadour (Santa Monica), World Arts (Culver City), Hotel Cafe (Hollywood), Barclays Center (Brooklyn).

MAJOR. has released an EP (i am MAJOR.) which features 2 singles and 2 music videos: "Why I Love You" and "Keep On", with over 126 million combined views on YouTube. Stevie Wonder described "Why I Love You" as "the wedding song of the year". The song has also reached Top 5 on the Adult R&B Billboard charts and certified Platinum by RIAA. Freelance journalist, Billy Johnson Jr., credited MAJOR. as being the "Hope-Dealer" of mainstream music in a Yahoo! Music article feature published in 2015.

Major's debut album, Even More, was released on September 7, 2018.

In 2019, Major had the recurring role on Fox musical drama series, Star. In 2021, he appeared as Curtis Mayfield in two episodes of Genius: Aretha.

== Discography ==
- I Am MAJOR (2016)
- Even More (2018)

== Filmography ==
Year	Title	Role	Notes
2013	Masters of Sex	Singer	Episode: "Asterion"
2015	Legend	Singer	
2019	Star	Cousin Rashad	4 episodes, season 3 Nominated NAACP Image Award for Outstanding Guest Performance in a Comedy or Drama Series
2019	Dear Santa, I Need a Date	Mark	TV film
2021	Genius	Curtis Mayfield	2 episodes, season 3
2022	Deitrick Haddon's the Fallen	Dallas Love	
2025	Found	Martin	Season 2, Episodes 11: "Missing While Misunderstood"
