= Jasmine V =

American singer

- Born: Jasmine Marie Villegas; December 7, 1993 (age 32); San Jose, California, US
- Genres: Pop; R&B; soul; hip hop
- Occupations: Singer; actress
- Years active: 2003–present
- Labels: Interscope; E.K.A.S.; Dame Dash; RCA (former)
- Website: jasminevmusic.com

Jasmine Marie Villegas (born December 7, 1993), known professionally as Jasmine V, is an American singer. She was signed to Damon Dash's label Dame Dash Music Group at the age of 12 and RCA Records at the age of 16 before signing to Interscope Records and Ester Dean's Eye Know a Secret (E.K.A.S.) Records.

== Career ==
At the age of nine, Villegas appeared in a commercial for the animated feature The Land Before Time IX. and her first professional singing performance at age 11, performing the United States national anthem at a Los Angeles Clippers game. Later that year, she signed a record contract with Damon Dash's Dame Dash Music Group and worked extensively on a debut that was slated to feature collaborations from label-mate and former Missy Elliott protégée, Nicole Wray. When she was 16, she then signed with RCA Records, and appeared in Justin Bieber's music video for his single "Baby", as his love interest in the video. She later joined Bieber on the second part of his My World Tour as well as at the Kids' Choice Awards. She also appeared in the Sean Kingston and Bieber music video for Eenie Meenie. Villegas has also written with musician Nick Jonas.

In 2013, Villegas signed with Interscope Records and Ester Dean's Eye Know a Secret (E.K.A.S.) Records. She later appeared alongside American rapper Becky G, on the cover of Latina magazine's February 2014 issue.

Her single, "That's Me Right There" featuring Kendrick Lamar debuted August 5, 2014, and rose to No. 39 on the Billboard Twitter Top Tracks chart. Her debut EP was released on November 10, of that year. On March 11, 2015, Villegas released a new single called "One Night" featuring Problem and Jeremih. The song samples "Kiss of Life" by Sade. On May 3, 2015, Villegas released the first installment in her songbook series (books inspired by her life and songs), co-written with R.W. Thomas. On June 8, 2015, Jasmine released a Spanish single titled "Renegades".

== Personal life ==
Villegas is of Filipino and Mexican descent. She has three brothers, Robert Villegas, Jream Andrew Sablan (a.k.a. Jdrew, Jream Andrew), and Justin Villegas. Her parents separated when she was a young girl. Her grandmother, Sofia Vales, was the one who got her started into modeling at the young age of six. Jasmine started out doing beauty pageant contests.

Villegas dated Justin Bieber from 2009 to 2010.

In 2014, Villegas began dating YouTuber Ronnie Banks after he appeared in her music video for the single "That's Me Right There." On November 2, 2015, Villegas announced via Twitter that she was expecting her first child with Banks. On February 19, 2016, she gave birth to their daughter. Villegas got engaged to Banks in December 2016, later the engagement was broken off.

On May 17, 2020, Villegas had a son with her boyfriend Omar Amin.

== Discography ==
=== Extended plays ===
Title	Album details
That's Me Right There	Released: November 10, 2014; Format: Digital download; Label: Interscope, E.K.A.S.
No Judgement	Released: May 3, 2019; Format: Digital download; Label: Self-released

=== Mixtapes ===
Title	Album details
S(he) Be(lie)ve(d)	Released: September 20, 2011; Format: Digital download; Label: Self-released

=== Singles ===
==== As lead artist ====
Title	Year	Peak chart positions		Album
Title	Year	US	US Airplay	Album
"Serious"	2010	—	—	Non-album single
"All These Boys"	2010	—	—	Non-album single
"Didn't Mean It"	2012	—	—	Non-album single
"Paint A Smile"	2013	—	—	Non-album single
"That's Me Right There" (featuring Kendrick Lamar)	2014	105	81	That's Me Right There EP
"Me and My Broken Heart" (with Golden)	2014	—	—	Non-album single
"Main Chick" (with Golden)	2014	—	—	Non-album single
"Gimme More"	2016	—	—	Non-album single
"Devil Wears Prada" (featuring Ronnie Banks)	2017	—	—	Non-album single
"Coldest Heartbreak Pt. II" (with Jrem Andrew)	2018	—	—	Non-album single
"Hands To Myself"	2019	—	—	Non-album single
"Personal"	2019	—	—	Non-album single
"Lessons"	2020	—	—	Non-album single
"Real You"	2020	—	—	Non-album single

==== As featured artist ====
- 2011: Why Can't We Be Friends? (Sean Kingston feat. Jasmine V)
- 2011: Hello (Ryan Leslie feat. Jasmine Villegas)
- 2013: Now Is The Time (Wally Lopez feat. Jasmine V)
- 2015: Get It On [Remix] (Ap The Great feat. Jasmine V, K Camp)
- 2017: The Chase [Interlude] (ITSG3! feat. Jasmine Villegas)
- 2019: Hold Me Down (Prince Sole feat. Jasmine V)

== Filmography ==
=== Guest starring appearances ===
Year	Show	Episode	Role	Notes
2003	My Wife and Kids	Michael's Band	Rachel	Guest appearance
2004	Threat Matrix	Extremist Makeover	Daughter 1#	Guest appearance
2004	Kellogg's Eggo	—	Girl eating Eggo	Commercial
2004	Stuff by Hilary Duff	—	Girl	Commercial
2005	Arwin!	—	Lydia	Main role alongside Selena Gomez
2006	The Nine	Outsiders	Tiffany	Guest appearance
2007	That's So Raven	Teacher's Pet	Patty	Guest appearance
2007–08	SOP	Music variety show	Herself	Partnered with Julie Anne San Jose

=== Music video appearances ===
Year	Song	Artist	Role	Notes
2004	"Jesus Walks"	Kanye West	Angel	Cameo
2005	"How to Deal"	Frankie J	Herself	Cameo
2010	"Baby"	Justin Bieber	Love interest	Main role
2010	"Eenie Meenie"	Sean Kingston and Justin Bieber	Party-goer	Extra
2011	"My Girl (Remix)"	Mindless Behavior feat. Ciara, Tyga, Lil Twist	Herself	Cameo
2012	"Slide Over"	Baby Bash	Guy's love interest	Main role
2013	"What U Like"	Jream Andrew	Herself	Main role
2013	"Now Is The Time"	Wally Lopez	Herself	Main role
2015	"This Could Be Us"	Rae Sremmurd	Swae Lee's ex-girlfriend	Cameo
2015	"Selfish Girls"	Jake Miller	Herself	Cameo
