= Harmony Samuels =

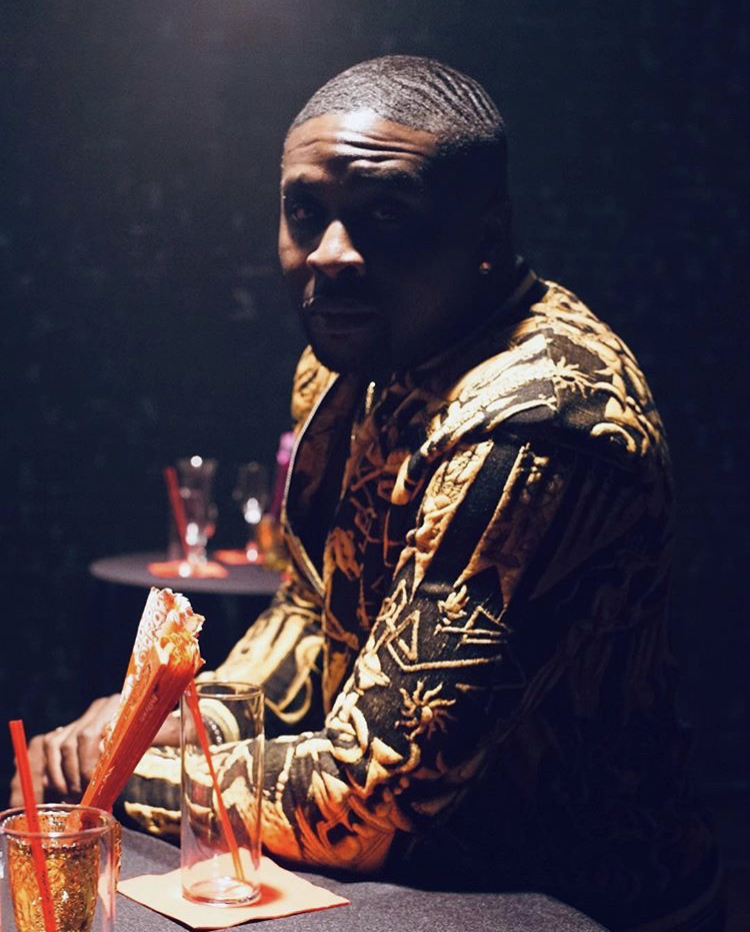
- Samuels in 2010

Background information
- Also known as: H-Money
- Born: Harmony Olakunle David Samuels; 16 May 1980 (age 46)
- Origin: London, England
- Genres: Hip hop; R&B; pop
- Occupations: Record producer, songwriter, multi-instrumentalist
- Instruments: Keyboards, guitar, bass guitar, drums
- Years active: 1995–present
- Label: B.O.E. Global

Harmony Olakunle David Samuels (born 16 May 1980), also known as H-Money, is an English record producer, multi-instrumentalist and songwriter. He has produced a multitude of hits for artists such as Brandy, Jennifer Lopez, Mary J. Blige, Ariana Grande, Fifth Harmony, Chip, Ciara, Fantasia, Janet Jackson, Chris Brown, Keyshia Cole, Ne-Yo and more.

== Background ==
Harmony Samuels was born 16 May 1980 in Tottenham, London to Nigerian parents. When he was 4 he taught himself how to play the piano and bass while playing for his church. He had become his church's musical director at the age of 12. It was at the age of 14 that he decided to become a music producer.

== Music career ==
Samuels' production career began in the UK, where he worked with some of the most relevant artists in the music scene including Chipmunk, Alesha Dixon, and Craig David.

In 2007, Samuels was on his last leg with the music industry; he had thought to himself to retire, and go back to his old school and become a music teacher when he caught the attention of producer Rodney Jerkins. Jerkins gave him a producer deal and a publishing deal. Samuels eventually moved to Los Angeles in 2009. In 2011, he opened his own recording studio, London Bridge Studios, in Los Angeles. After transitioning to LA, he continued to build on his career by working with artists such as Maroon 5, Chris Brown, Mary J. Blige, Brandy Norwood, Kelly Rowland, Jennifer Hudson, Ne-Yo, Keyshia Cole, and others.

In 2013, he produced Ariana Grande's debut hit single "The Way" as well as several songs from her debut album, Yours Truly and My Everything. He also contributed to 13 out of 14 songs on Fantasia's album Side Effects of You.

Between grooming rising stars with his knowledge of the music industry, and educating students and professionals alike with his mentoring and experience, Samuels debuted his first act signed to B.O.E. in 2016, MAJOR. Two years later, with over 70 million views on YouTube, "Why I Love You" had gone gold, B.O.E.'s first certified gold record.

He currently resides in Los Angeles, where he runs B.O.E. Global.
