= List of number-one digital albums of 2012 (Australia) =

ARIA Charts number-one digital albums of 2012 < 2011 2013 >

Other Australian number-one charts of 2012
- albums
- singles
- urban singles
- dance singles
- club tracks
- digital tracks

Top Australian singles and albums of 2012
- Triple J Hottest 100
- top 25 singles
- top 25 albums

The ARIA Albums Chart ranks the best-performing albums and extended plays (EPs) in Australia. Its data, published by the Australian Recording Industry Association, is based collectively on the weekly digital sales of albums and EPs.

== Chart history ==
Date	Album	Artist(s)	Ref.
2 January	Christmas	Michael Bublé	
9 January	Sorry for Party Rocking	LMFAO	
16 January	21	Adele	
23 January	Bangarang	Skrillex	
30 January	Bangarang	Skrillex	
6 February	Moonfire	Boy & Bear	
13 February	Born to Die	Lana Del Rey	
20 February	Whitney: The Greatest Hits	Whitney Houston	
27 February	21	Adele	
5 March	Bangarang	Skrillex	
12 March	Bangarang	Skrillex	
19 March	Drinking from the Sun	Hilltop Hoods	
26 March	Drinking from the Sun	Hilltop Hoods	
2 April	MDNA	Madonna	
9 April	Pink Friday: Roman Reloaded	Nicki Minaj	
16 April	No Plans	Cold Chisel	
23 April	Up All Night	One Direction	
30 April	Blunderbuss	Jack White	
7 May	+	Ed Sheeran	
14 May	Born to Die	Lana Del Rey	
21 May	The Story So Far	Keith Urban	
28 May	The Temper Trap	The Temper Trap	
4 June	Born And Raised	John Mayer	
11 June	The Ol' Razzle Dazzle	Missy Higgins	
18 June	Spirit Bird	Xavier Rudd	
25 June	Believe	Justin Bieber	
2 July	My Journey	Karise Eden	
9 July	My Journey	Karise Eden	
16 July	Fortune	Chris Brown	
23 July	Broken Brights	Angus Stone	
30 July	Some Nights	Fun	
6 August	Some Nights	Fun	
13 August	+	Ed Sheeran	
20 August	+	Ed Sheeran	
27 August	Birdy	Birdy	
3 September	Birdy	Birdy	
10 September	North	Matchbox Twenty	
17 September	Coexist	The xx	
24 September	The Truth About Love	Pink	
1 October	Babel	Mumford & Sons	
8 October	The Truth About Love	Pink	
15 October	The Truth About Love	Pink	
22 October	Triple J's Like a Version Volume 8	Various Artists	
29 October	Red	Taylor Swift	
5 November	Red	Taylor Swift	
12 November	18 Months	Calvin Harris	
19 November	Take Me Home	One Direction	
26 November	The Truth About Love	Pink	
3 December	Girl on Fire	Alicia Keys	
10 December	Christmas	Michael Bublé	
17 December	Christmas	Michael Bublé	
24 December	Christmas	Michael Bublé	
31 December	Christmas	Michael Bublé	

== Number-one artists ==
Position	Artist	Weeks at No. 1
1	Michael Bublé	5
2	Pink	4
2	Skrillex	4
3	Ed Sheeran	3
4	Adele	2
4	Birdy	2
4	Fun	2
4	Hilltop Hoods	2
4	Karise Eden	2
4	Lana Del Rey	2
4	One Direction	2
4	Taylor Swift	2
5	Alicia Keys	1
5	Angus Stone	1
5	Boy & Bear	1
5	Calvin Harris	1
5	Cold Chisel	1
5	Jack White	1
5	John Mayer	1
5	Justin Bieber	1
5	Keith Urban	1
5	LMFAO	1
5	Madonna	1
5	Matchbox Twenty	1
5	Missy Higgins	1
5	Mumford & Sons	1
5	Nicki Minaj	1
5	The Temper Trap	1
5	Whitney Houston	1
5	Xavier Rudd	1

== See also ==
- 2012 in music
- ARIA Charts
- List of number-one singles of 2012 (Australia)
