= List of number-one urban albums of 2012 (Australia) =

ARIA Charts number-one urban albums of 2012 < 2011 2013 >

Other Australian number-one charts of 2012
- albums
- singles
- urban singles
- dance singles
- club tracks
- digital tracks

Top Australian singles and albums of 2012
- Triple J Hottest 100
- top 25 singles
- top 25 albums

This is a list of albums that reached number-one on the ARIA Urban Albums Chart in 2012. The ARIA Urban Albums Chart is a weekly chart that ranks the best-performing urban albums in Australia. It is published by the Australian Recording Industry Association (ARIA), an organisation that collects music data for the weekly ARIA Charts. To be eligible to appear on the chart, the recording must be an album of a predominantly urban nature.

== Chart history ==
| Issue date | Album | Artist(s) | Reference |
|---|---|---|---|
| 2 January | Doo-Wops & Hooligans | Bruno Mars | |
| 9 January | Doo-Wops & Hooligans | Bruno Mars | |
| 16 January | Doo-Wops & Hooligans | Bruno Mars | |
| 23 January | Doo-Wops & Hooligans | Bruno Mars | |
| 30 January | Falling & Flying | 360 | |
| 6 February | Falling & Flying | 360 | |
| 13 February | Falling & Flying | 360 | |
| 20 February | Whitney: The Greatest Hits | Whitney Houston | |
| 27 February | The Ultimate Collection | Whitney Houston | |
| 5 March | The Ultimate Collection | Whitney Houston | |
| 12 March | The Ultimate Collection | Whitney Houston | |
| 19 March | Drinking from the Sun | Hilltop Hoods | |
| 26 March | Drinking from the Sun | Hilltop Hoods | |
| 2 April | Drinking from the Sun | Hilltop Hoods | |
| 9 April | Drinking from the Sun | Hilltop Hoods | |
| 16 April | Drinking from the Sun | Hilltop Hoods | |
| 23 April | Drinking from the Sun | Hilltop Hoods | |
| 30 April | Drinking from the Sun | Hilltop Hoods | |
| 7 May | Drinking from the Sun | Hilltop Hoods | |
| 14 May | Drinking from the Sun | Hilltop Hoods | |
| 21 May | Drinking from the Sun | Hilltop Hoods | |
| 28 May | Falling & Flying | 360 | |
| 4 June | 101 R&B Hits | Various Artists | |
| 11 June | 101 R&B Hits | Various Artists | |
| 18 June | Looking 4 Myself | Usher | |
| 25 June | 101 R&B Hits | Various Artists | |
| 2 July | 101 R&B Hits | Various Artists | |
| 9 July | Wild Ones | Flo Rida | |
| 16 July | Fortune | Chris Brown | |
| 23 July | Fortune | Chris Brown | |
| 30 July | R&B Superclub Volume 12 | Various Artists | |
| 6 August | Ministry of Sound Anthems Hip Hop volume 2 | Various Artists | |
| 13 August | Drinking from the Sun | Hilltop Hoods | |
| 20 August | Ministry of Sound Anthems Hip Hop volume 2 | Various Artists | |
| 27 August | Ministry of Sound Anthems Hip Hop volume 2 | Various Artists | |
| 3 September | Timomatic | Timomatic | |
| 10 September | Timomatic | Timomatic | |
| 17 September | Falling & Flying | 360 | |
| 24 September | This Was Tomorrow | Seth Sentry | |
| 1 October | Cruel Summer | GOOD Music | |
| 8 October | This Was Tomorrow | Seth Sentry | |
| 15 October | Timomatic | Timomatic | |
| 22 October | Smokey's Haunt | Urthboy | |
| 29 October | Channel Orange | Frank Ocean | |
| 5 November | Crave Vol. 7 – Mixed by DJ Havana Brown | Various Artists | |
| 12 November | No Rest for the Sickest | Kerser | |
| 19 November | Crave Vol. 7 – Mixed by DJ Havana Brown | Various Artists | |
| 26 November | Unapologetic | Rihanna | |
| 3 December | Unapologetic | Rihanna | |
| 10 December | Unapologetic | Rihanna | |
| 17 December | The Heist | Macklemore & Ryan Lewis | |
| 24 December | Unapologetic | Rihanna | |
| 31 December | Unapologetic | Rihanna | |

== See also ==
- 2012 in music
- List of number-one albums of 2012 (Australia)
