= List of number-one country albums of 2012 (Australia) =

ARIA Charts number-one country albums of 2012 < 2011 2013 >

Other Australian number-one charts of 2012
- albums
- singles
- urban singles
- dance singles
- club tracks
- digital tracks

Top Australian singles and albums of 2012
- Triple J Hottest 100
- top 25 singles
- top 25 albums

These are the Australian Country number-one albums of 2012, per the ARIA Charts.

Issue date	Album	Artist
2 January	Own the Night	Lady Antebellum
9 January	Own the Night	Lady Antebellum
16 January	Own the Night	Lady Antebellum
23 January	Cream of Country 15	Various artists
30 January	Cream of Country 15	Various artists
6 February	Emotional Traffic	Tim McGraw
13 February	Emotional Traffic	Tim McGraw
20 February	Emotional Traffic	Tim McGraw
27 February	Emotional Traffic	Tim McGraw
5 March	Emotional Traffic	Tim McGraw
12 March	Home	Troy Cassar-Daley
19 March	Speak Now World Tour – Live	Taylor Swift
26 March	Country Proud	McAlister Kemp
2 April	Emotional Traffic	Tim McGraw
9 April	Tuskegee	Lionel Richie
16 April	Tuskegee	Lionel Richie
23 April	Tuskegee	Lionel Richie
30 April	Greatest Hits: 18 Kids	Keith Urban
7 May	Tuskegee	Lionel Richie
14 May	Blown Away	Carrie Underwood
21 May	The Story So Far	Keith Urban
28 May	The Story So Far	Keith Urban
4 June	The Story So Far	Keith Urban
11 June	The Story So Far	Keith Urban
18 June	The Story So Far	Keith Urban
25 June	The Story So Far	Keith Urban
2 July	The Story So Far	Keith Urban
9 July	The Story So Far	Keith Urban
16 July	The Story So Far	Keith Urban
23 July	The Story So Far	Keith Urban
30 July	The Story So Far	Keith Urban
6 August	The Story So Far	Keith Urban
13 August	The Story So Far	Keith Urban
20 August	There Will Be Love	Adam Brand
27 August	There Will Be Love	Adam Brand
3 September	The Story So Far	Keith Urban
10 September	The Story So Far	Keith Urban
17 September	Wreck & Ruin	Kasey Chambers & Shane Nicholson
24 September	Wreck & Ruin	Kasey Chambers & Shane Nicholson
1 October	Wreck & Ruin	Kasey Chambers & Shane Nicholson
8 October	Own The Night	Lady Antebellum
15 October	Wreck & Ruin	Kasey Chambers & Shane Nicholson
22 October	Wreck & Ruin	Kasey Chambers & Shane Nicholson
29 October	Red	Taylor Swift
5 November	Red	Taylor Swift
12 November	Red	Taylor Swift
19 November	Red	Taylor Swift
26 November	Red	Taylor Swift
3 December	Red	Taylor Swift
10 December	Red	Taylor Swift
17 December	Red	Taylor Swift
24 December	Red	Taylor Swift
31 December	Red	Taylor Swift

== See also ==
- 2012 in music
- List of number-one albums of 2012 (Australia)
