= The Voice (Australian TV series) discography =

The Voice is an Australian reality talent show based on the original Dutch version of the program created by John de Mol and is part of a wider international franchise. The winner receives a Universal Music Australia recording contract. Karise Eden was the winner of the first season. Her debut single, "You Won't Let Me", peaked at number five on the Australian ARIA Singles Chart, and her debut album My Journey reached number one on the ARIA Albums Chart. Eden's second single, "Threads of Silence", peaked at number 19. The winner of the second season was Harrison Craig. His debut single, "Unconditional", charted at number 15 in Australia. Craig's debut album More Than a Dream reached number one in both Australia and New Zealand and received a platinum certification in Australia.

Some contestants who did not win The Voice were given record deals and have also achieved success in the Australia, while other contestants have released non-charting albums and singles independently. The contestants' record their weekly performances which are released to the iTunes Store after the show and can sometimes lead to a large number of downloads.

The show ran on Nine Network from 2012 to 2020 and premiered on Seven Network in 2021. Coaches throughout the run of the series have included Delta Goodrem, Seal, Joel Madden, Keith Urban, Ricky Martin, Kylie Minogue, will.i.am, Benji Madden, Jessie J, Ronan Keating, Boy George, Kelly Rowland, Joe Jonas, Guy Sebastian, Rita Ora, Jessica Mauboy, Jason Derulo, Adam Lambert, Leann Rimes, Kate Miller-Heidke, Melanie C, and Richard Marx.

== Albums ==
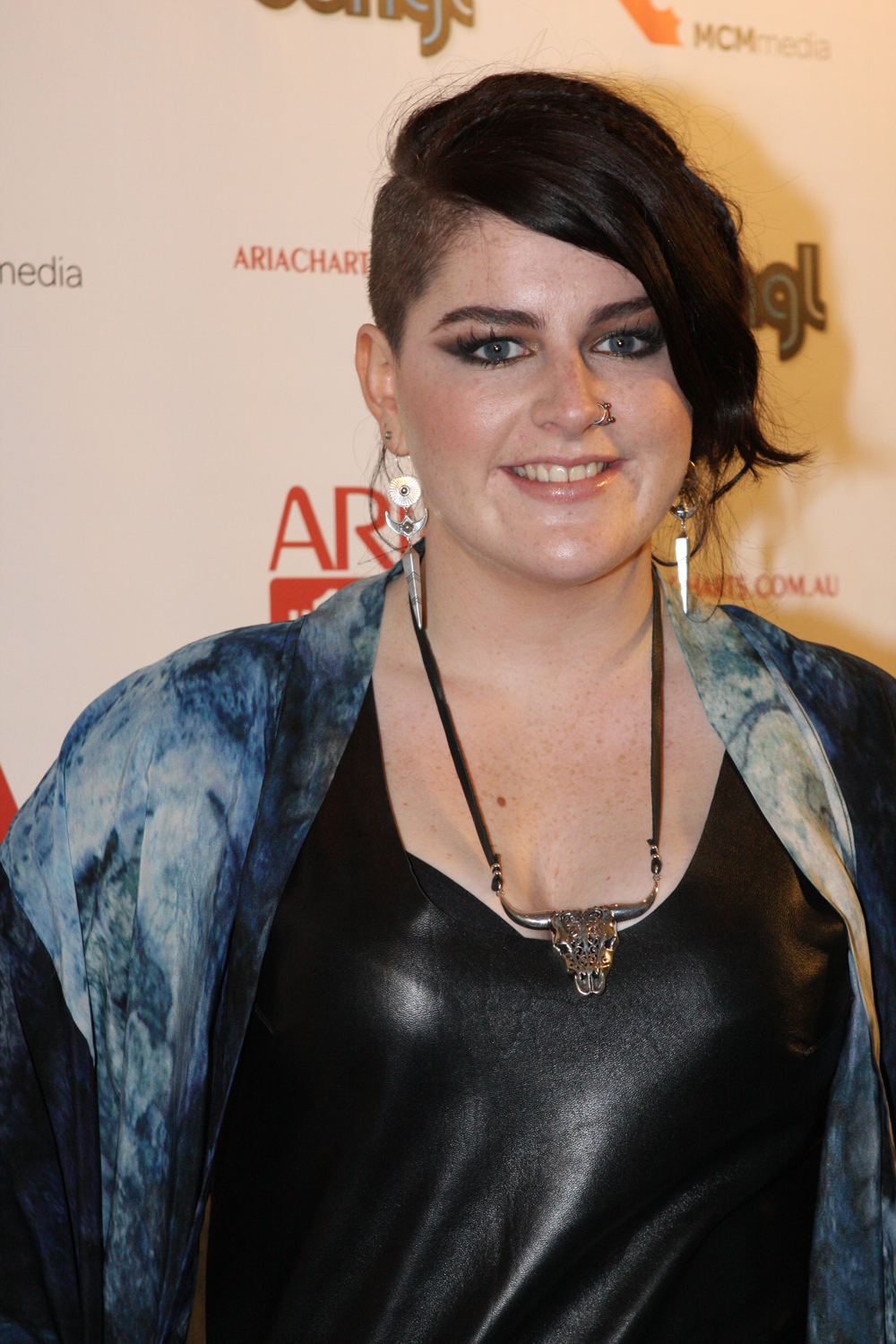
Season one winner Karise Eden has achieved a number one album and a top-five single.

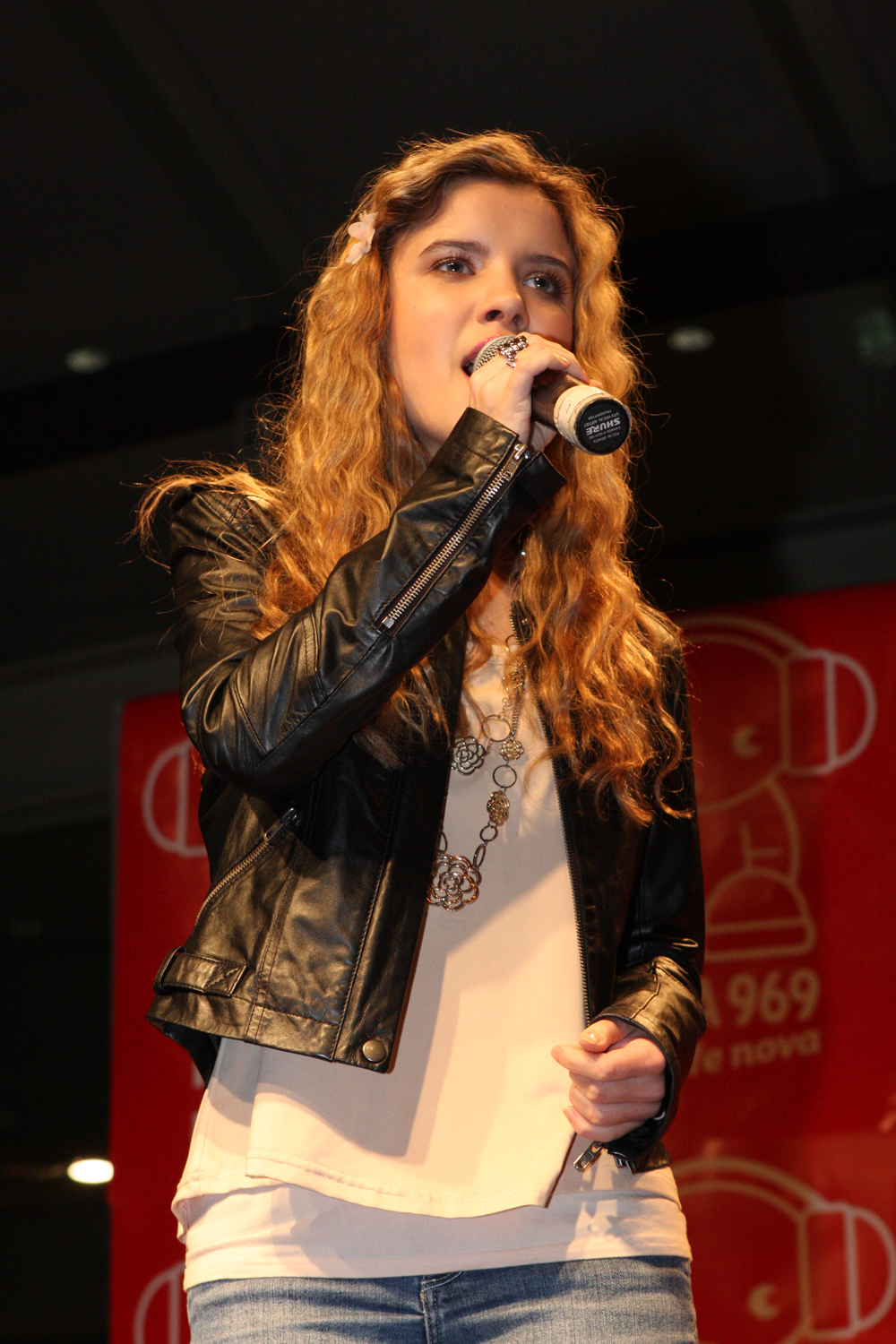
Rachael Leahcar who finished third in the first season has achieved two top-ten albums.

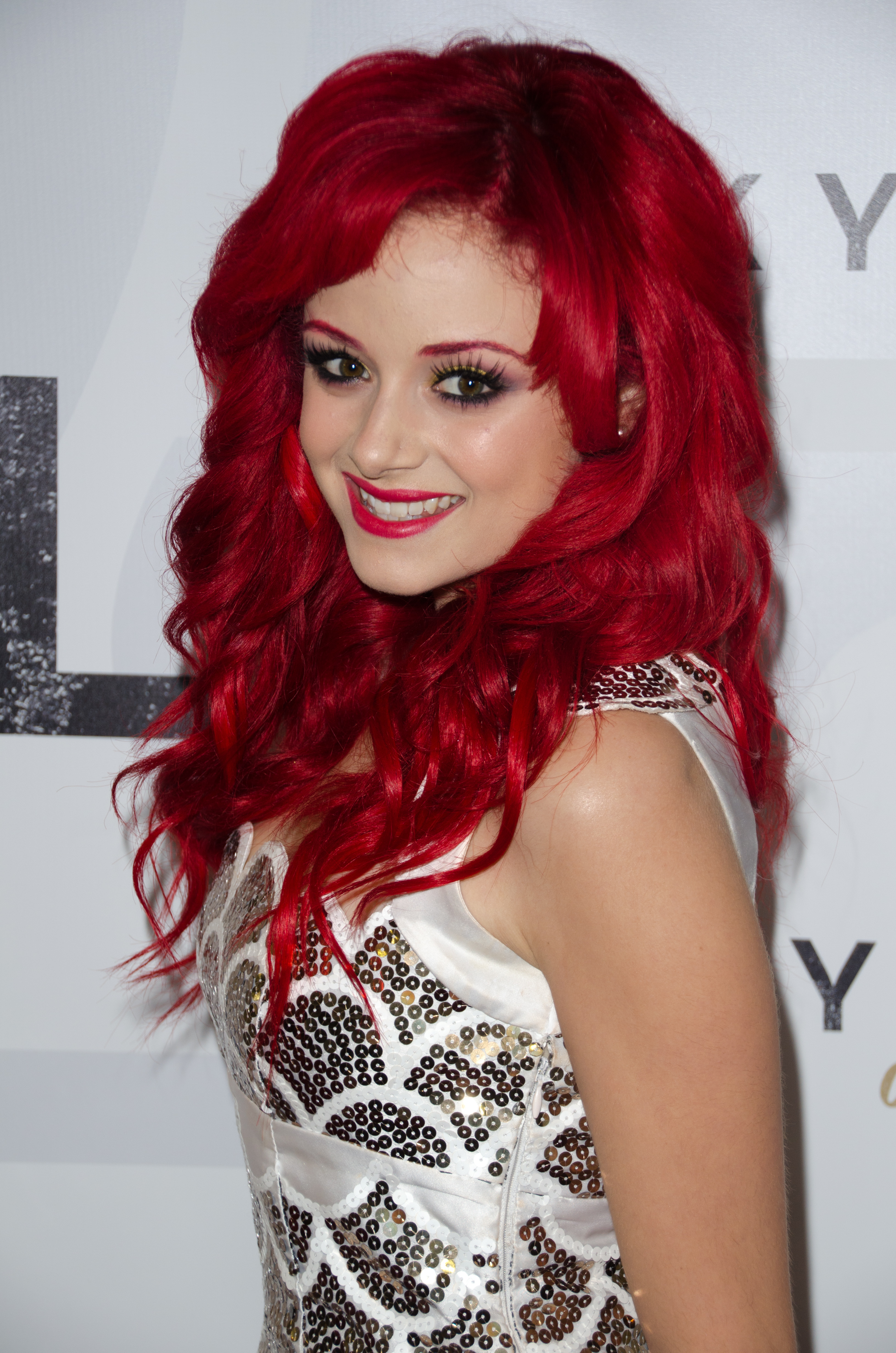
Sarah De Bono who finished fourth in the first season has achieved a top-fifty single and a top-ten album.

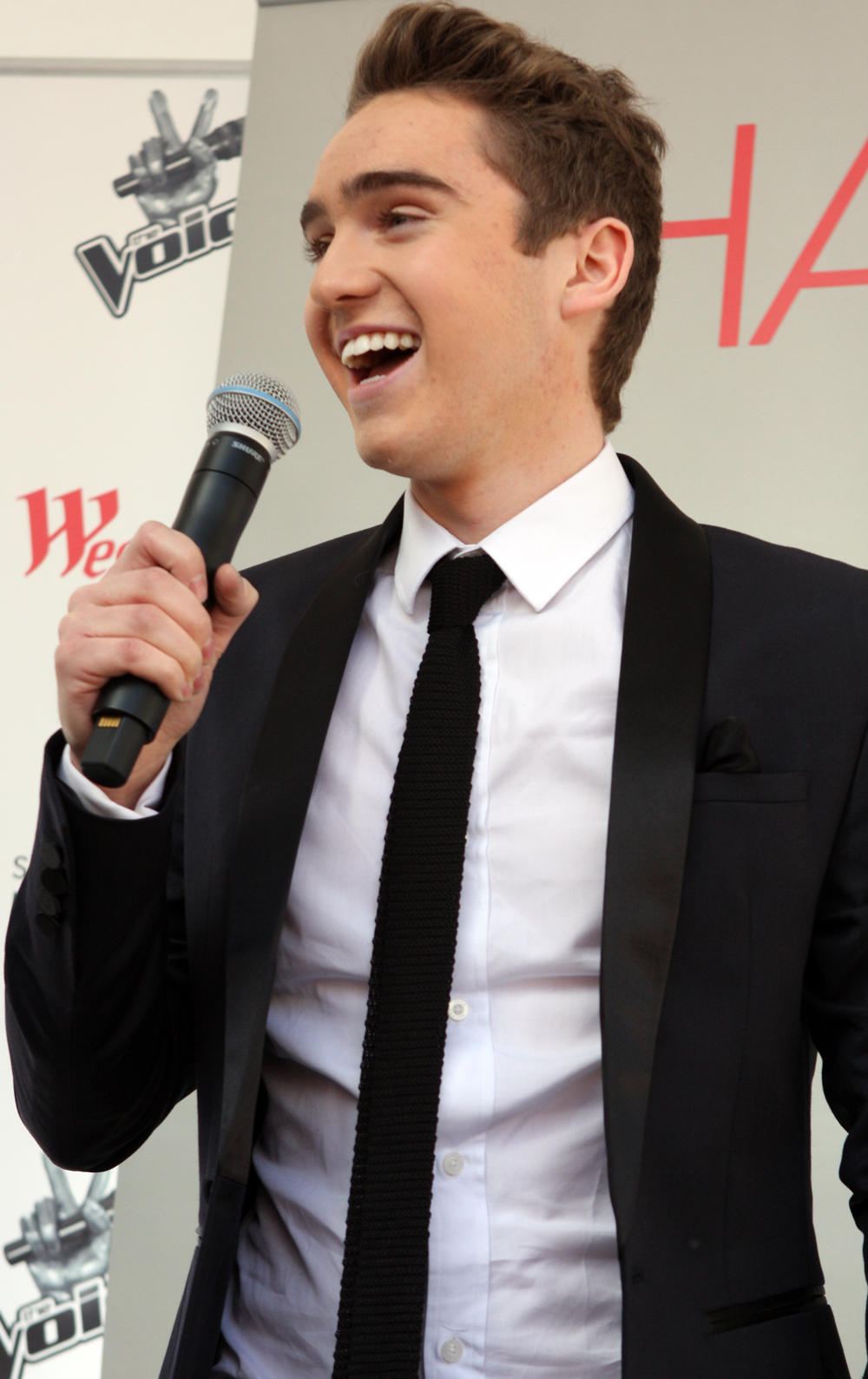
Season two winner Harrison Craig has achieved a number one album and a top-fifteen single.

=== Studio albums ===
Artist	Series	Title	Release date	Peak chart positions		Certifications	
Artist	Series	Title	Release date	AUS	NZ	Certifications	
Karise Eden	1	My Journey	26 June 2012	1	3	ARIA: 2× Platinum	
Darren Percival	1	Happy Home	13 July 2012	3	—	ARIA: Gold	
Rachael Leahcar	1	Shooting Star	13 July 2012	5	—		
Sarah De Bono	1	No Shame	13 July 2012	7	—		
Prinnie and Mahalia	1	Come Together	5 October 2012	—	—		
Darren Percival	1	A Tribute to Ray Charles	16 November 2012	—	—		
Rachael Leahcar	1	Romantique	26 April 2013	10	—		
Matt Hetherington	1	Matt Hetherington	18 May 2013	—	—		
Harrison Craig	2	More Than a Dream	25 June 2013	1	1	ARIA: Platinum	
Luke Kennedy	2	A Time for Us	12 July 2013	6	—		
Celia Pavey	2	This Music	12 July 2013	14	—		
Danny Ross	2	As the Crow Flies	12 July 2013	26	—		
Harrison Craig	2	L.O.V.E.	11 April 2014	5	—		
Anja Nissen	3	Anja Nissen	1 August 2014	11	—		
Ellie Drennan	4	Close Your Eyes	11 September 2015	14	—		
Alfie Arcuri	5	Zenith	29 July 2016	5	—		
Harrison Craig	2	Kings of Vegas	4 November 2016	5	—		
Judah Kelly	6	Count On Me	28 July 2017	3	—		"—" denotes a recording that did not chart in that territory.

== Singles ==
Artist(s)	Series	Title	Release date	Peak chart positions	Certifications
Artist(s)	Series	Title	Release date	AUS	Certifications
Karise Eden	1	"You Won't Let Me"	19 June 2012	5	ARIA: Gold
Darren Percival	1	"In the Blowing Wind"	29 June 2012	—	
Rachael Leahcar	1	"Coming Home Again"	29 June 2012	—	
Sarah De Bono	1	"No Shame"	29 June 2012	50	
Glenn Cunningham	1	"Heaven"	10 October 2013	—	
Danni Da Ros	1	"Cool Together (Live at the Basement)"	30 November 2013	—	
Brittany Cairns	1	"Behind the Scenes"	22 March 2013	—	
Adam Martin	1	"In My Dreams"	5 April 2013	—	
Prinnie Stevens	1	"Don't Wake Me Up"	12 April 2013	73	
Ben Hazlewood	1	"Parachute"	23 April 2013	—	
Karise Eden	1	"Threads of Silence"	4 June 2013	19	
Harrison Craig	2	"Unconditional"	18 June 2013	15	
Luke Kennedy	2	"Stay a Minute"	5 July 2013	—	
Celia Pavey	2	"Believe Me"	8 July 2013	—	
Danny Ross	2	"Pockets"	8 July 2013	—	
Danni Da Ros	1	"Exquisite (Acoustic Version)"	12 July 2013	—	
Emma Birdsall	1	"Lovers & Friends"	16 August 2013	—	
Sarah De Bono	1	"Oasis"	18 October 2013	—	
Adam Martin	1	"This World Is Yours"	25 October 2013	—	
Anja Nissen	3	"I Have Nothing"	16 July 2014	52	
Anja Nissen	3	"I'm So Excited" (featuring will.i.am and Cody Wise)	31 October 2014	42	
Anja Nissen	3	"Anyone Who Had a Heart"	19 May 2015	30	
Ellie Drennan	4	"Ghost"	28 August 2015	25	
Ellie Drennan	4	"Hard Love"	24 June 2016	41	
Alfie Arcuri	5	"Cruel"	10 July 2016	88	
Alfie Arcuri	5	"If They Only Knew"	19 May 2017	96	
Judah Kelly	6	"Hallelujah"	25 June 2017	64	
Bella Taylor Smith	10	"Higher"	5 September 2021	31	
"—" denotes a recording that did not chart in that territory.

== Certifications ==
=== Australia ===
The current Australian Recording Industry Association (ARIA) certification levels for albums and singles:

- Gold: 35,000 units
- Platinum: 70,000 units

Artist	Total certifications		
Artist	Platinum	Gold	Sales
Karise Eden	3	5	385,000
Harrison Craig	1	1	105,000
Darren Percival		1	35,000
Sarah De Bono		1	35,000

=== New Zealand ===
The current Recorded Music NZ (RMNZ) certification levels for albums and singles:

- Gold: 7,500 units
- Platinum: 15,000 units

Artist	Total certifications		
Artist	Platinum	Gold	Sales
Karise Eden		1	7,500
