= 2012 in Australian music =

The following is a list of notable events that have happened in 2012 in music in Australia.

== Events ==
=== January ===
- Big Day Out 2012 was held in Sydney, Melbourne, Perth, Adelaide and the Gold Coast, headlined by Soundgarden (in all venues) and Kanye West (in Sydney, Melbourne and the Gold Coast).

=== February ===
- 2012 Soundwave (Australian music festival) music festival took place. The line-up consisted of 95 musicians and music groups.

=== March ===
- Hermitude's HyperParadise won the 2012 Australian Music Prize

=== July ===
- Splendour in the Grass 2012 is held at the North Byron Parklands in Yelgun, New South Wales, headlined by Jack White, Bloc Party and The Smashing Pumpkins.

=== November ===
- ARIA Music Awards of 2012 was an award ceremony to acknowledged Australian musicians on musical achievements.
- Yothu Yindi was inducted into the ARIA Hall of Fame.
- Stereosonic was held in Brisbane, Adelaide, Perth, Sydney, and Melbourne. It is an annual music festival that features electronic dance musicians.

== Albums and singles ==
=== June ===
- The Presets released their single "Youth in Trouble".

=== August ===
- The Presets released their single "Ghosts".

== Deaths ==
- January 21 – Jodie-Anne White, Australian dancer and choreographer (b. 1967)

== See also ==
- List of number-one singles of 2012 (Australia)
- List of number-one albums of 2012 (Australia)
