= Tightrope Walker (album) =

Studio album by Rachael Yamagata
- Released: September 23, 2016
- Length: 46:46
- Labels: Frankenfish, Thirty Tigers
- Producers: Rachael Yamagata, John Alagía

Rachael Yamagata chronology
Heavyweight EP (2012)	Tightrope Walker (2016)

Singles from Tightrope Walker
- 1. "Nobody" Released: July 21, 2016; 2. "Over" Released: August 24, 2016; 3. "Let Me Be Your Girl" Released: September 9, 2016

Tightrope Walker is the fourth studio album by American singer-songwriter Rachael Yamagata. It was released on September 23, 2016 via Frankenfish Records in North America. The singles for the album are "Nobody", "Over", and "Let Me Be Your Girl".

== Development ==
For the second time, since the creation of Chesapeake in 2011, Yamagata utilized the fan-funded music platform PledgeMusic to fund the album Tightrope Walker. The album production ideas were spontaneous, experimental. Per her interview with AXS, she stated "I just completely let whatever road we felt like taking. Whoever musicians were in the room, whatever instruments were in the room, we tried everything. It was a lot of experimentation. [...] All of the production ideas were just very in-the-moment, spontaneous and fun to try. That led to us having a collection of arrangements I hadn't done before. We have mandolin on some tracks, of course I love strings and electric guitar, I write a lot on piano. Because we recorded in my house, we had the leisure of time, a very relaxed feel in the middle of the woods, with some great musicians up in Woodstock. I think a lot of the sounds came because we had fun with it. I was trying to trace the lyric, see what the storyline is, and then match the soundscape to what I'm trying to get across with the idea. That often takes me to strange, and unusual places." The album name was influenced by an interview with Philippe Petit, the tightrope walker who crossed between the twin towers in New York City in 1974. Yamagata was affected by his response to an interview question that asked why he did what he did, and he responded "Why - There is no why." Yamagata's concept for the album started with a vision she had at her home in Woodstock, when she envisioned several strangers sitting in a tent, along with scenes from each of their past. This communal gathering showed there was a connection between the strangers. This allowed the album to focus on several themes, from hardships in careers, family issues, perseverance, relentlessness, owning your own power, while showing an optimism about life.

== Track listing ==
All tracks are written by Rachael Yamagata.

No.	Title	Length
1.	"Tightrope Walker"	5:43
2.	"Nobody"	4:53
3.	"EZ Target"	4:01
4.	"Over"	4:13
5.	"Let Me Be Your Girl"	4:49
6.	"Break Apart"	4:59
7.	"I'm Going Back"	5:58
8.	"Rainsong"	4:41
9.	"Black Sheep"	3:39
10.	"Money Fame Thunder"	3:50
Total length:		46:46

== Personnel ==
=== Musicians ===
- Rachael Yamagata – Acoustic guitar, synth bass, key bass, piano, glockenspiel, mellotron, brush piano strings, tambourine, shaker, vocals
- John Alagía – Acoustic guitar, bass, synth bass, mellotron, B3 organ, organ, Rhodes, Farfeeza, Wurly, string pads, omnisphere, percussion, flute, backing vocals (track 4, 5)
- Jamie Hartman - Backing vocals (track 4)
- Paloma Gil - Spoken word (track 8)
- Kevin Salem – Electric guitar, acoustic guitar, keyboard pads, harmonica
- Pete Hanlon - Electric guitar, percussion, tambourine
- Clive Barnes - Electric guitar
- Michael Chaves - Electric guitar, acoustic guitar, ukulele
- Zach Djanikian – Acoustic guitar, mandolin, saxophones (written, arranged, performed), piano, Moog, bells, banjo, Wurly
- Owen Biddle – Acoustic guitar, bass, upright bass, Moog
- Brandon Morrison - Bass
- Oli Kraus - Strings (written, arranged, performed)
- Jon Solo - Piano
- Ben Perowsky – Drums, percussion
- Lee Falco - Drums
- Matt Chamberlain - Drums, Casio drums
- Victor Indrizzo - Drums, shakers, clap pad
- Russell Siminis - Drums, chains, cabasa, kalimba, thumb piano
- Randy Cooke - Drums
- Aaron Comess - Drums, percussion
- Manuel Quintana - Drums, shaker

=== Production ===
- Rachael Yamagata – Producer, programming, drum editing, recording of rain
- John Alagía – Producer, programming, drum editing, additional mixing
- Pete Hanlon - Additional production, recording, engineering, programming
- Kevin Salem - Additional production, recording, engineering
- Chris Bittner - Recording, engineering
- Dan Piscina - Recording, engineering, drum editing, mixing
- Billy Centenaro - Additional engineering, additional mixing
- Shawn Everett - Mixer
- Matt Chamberlain - Recording and engineering of himself
- Chris Steffen - Recording and engineering of himself
- Victor Indrizzo - Recording and engineering of himself
- Oli Krauss - Recording and engineering of himself
- Randy Cooke - Recording and engineering of himself
- Michael Chaves - Recording and engineering of himself
- Louise Hayat-Camard - Translation (English to French)
- Paloma Gil - Translation (English to French)
- Brad Blackwood - Mastering
