= Threads of Silence =

Single by Karise Eden
- Released: 3 June 2013
- Recorded: 2013
- Genre: Pop
- Length: 3:58
- Label: Universal
- Songwriter(s): Karise Eden, Rachael Yamagata

Karise Eden singles chronology
"You Won't Let Me" (2012)	"Threads of Silence" (2013)	"Dynamite" (2014)

"Threads of Silence" is a song by Australian singer songwriter, Karise Eden. The song was reeled as a digital download in Australia on 3 June 2013 peaked at number 19 on the ARIA Singles Charts. Eden performed the song live on The Voice Australia on the day of release.

== Charts ==
Chart (2013)	Peak position
Australia (ARIA)	19

== Release history ==
Region	Date	Format	Label
Australia	3 June 2013	Digital download	Universal Music Australia
