= Born to Fight (album) =

Studio album by Karise Eden
- Released: 23 November 2018
- Length: 37:43
- Label: Island, Universal
- Producer: Jan Skubiszewski

Karise Eden chronology
Things I've Done (2014)	Born to Fight (2018)	Into the Black (2022)

Singles from Things I've Done
- 1. "Temporary Lovers" Released: 19 October 2018; 2. "Gimme Your Love" Released: 16 November 2018; 3. "Born to Fight" Released: 6 December 2018

Born to Fight is the third studio album by Australian singer and songwriter Karise Eden. It was released on 23 November 2018 by Universal Music Australia. Upon announcement, Eden said: "I've always been singing sad soul songs and I thought, just for once, there's another side of my personality that's never been shown on camera, my off-screen sass and who I am as a person, and that's a lot of what poured into this album."

The album was supported by the Born to Fight national tour, from February to May 2019.

== Reception ==
David from auspOp scored the album 4 out of 5 and called the album "a collection of powerful, confident and sassy songs." David named "Gimme Your Love" and "Maybe You Can Love Me Anyway" as his favourite songs on the album because "Karise sings about her desires, her dreams and these gorgeous tunes really bring them to life".

Jeff Jenkins from Stack Magazine said "With her sassy attitude and potent vocal, Eden comes across as a thrilling mix of Janis Joplin and Renée Geyer."

== Track listing ==
No.	Title	Length
1.	"Stop Fucking with My Head"	3:15
2.	"Temporary Lovers"	3:12
3.	"Born to Fight"	3:14
4.	"Gimme Your Love"	3:29
5.	"Ain't Thinkin' About You"	3:37
6.	"Baby Goodbye"	3:25
7.	"Powerless"	3:15
8.	"Hopeless"	5:09
9.	"Maybe You Can Love Me Anyway"	4:56
10.	"Ted"	4:11

== Charts ==
Chart (2018)	Peak position
Australian Albums (ARIA)	37

== Release history ==
Country	Date	Format	Label	Catalogue
Australia	23 November 2018	CD, digital download, streaming	Island, Universal Music Australia	7708210
