= Things I've Done =

Studio album by Karise Eden
- Released: 17 October 2014
- Recorded: 2014
- Genre: Pop
- Length: 46:38
- Labels: Mercury; Universal

Karise Eden chronology
My Journey (2012)	Things I've Done (2014)	Born to Fight (2018)

Singles from Things I've Done
- 1. "Dynamite" Released: 12 September 2014; 2. "Loneliness" Released: 3 April 2015

Things I've Done is the second studio album by Australian singer and songwriter Karise Eden. It was released on 17 October 2014 by Universal Music Australia and debuted at number five on the ARIA Albums Chart.

== Reception ==
Brad S from auspOp called the album "stellar" saying "Maybe it's her voice, which is part Janis Joplin, part Aretha Franklin and all heart, or maybe just the classy production throughout, but this feels like an ‘artist’ album in a way her contemporaries only wish they could pull off." adding "Things I've Done is a triumphant celebration of both Karise's extraordinary voice and the personal obstacles she's had to overcome."

== Track listing ==
No.	Title	Writer(s)	Length
1.	"Black Heart"	Karise Eden; Jon Levine	3:21
2.	"Taking It All"	Eden; Mike Elizondo	3:26
3.	"Dynamite"	Wayne Hector; Steve Mac; John Newman	3:23
4.	"Loneliness"	Wayne Connolly; Eden; Lee Anna McCollum; Taylor Parks; Adam Spark	3:50
5.	"Things I've Done"	Eden; Jon Hume	4:19
6.	"Don't Ask Me"	Jez Ashurst; Eden; Emma Rohan	3:53
7.	"She Don't"	Eden; Eric J. Dubowsky]]	3:58
8.	"134 Days"	Eden; Ryan Laubscher	4:44
9.	"We Got the Night"	Eden; Mark Lizotte	3:53
10.	"House on Fire"	Eden; Matt Morris	2:55
11.	"Broken Hearted"	Eden; Dubowsky	5:10
12.	"Something in the Water"	Eden; Hume; Tiffany Vartanyan	3:47
Total length:			46:38

== Charts ==
=== Weekly charts ===
Chart (2014)	Peak position
Australian Albums (ARIA)	5

=== Year-end charts ===
Chart (2014)	Position
Australian Artist Albums Chart	14

== Release history ==
Country	Date	Format	Label	Catalogue
Australia	17 October 2014	CD, digital download	Universal Music Australia	4703626
