= Heavyweight EP =

EP by Rachael Yamagata
- Released: November 20, 2012
- Length: 25:40
- Label: Frankenfish Records
- Producer: John Alagía

Rachael Yamagata chronology
| Chesapeake (2011) | Heavyweight EP (2012) | Tightrope Walker (2016) |

Heavyweight EP is a 2012 EP by Rachael Yamagata.

== Development ==
The EP consists of leftovers from the creation of Chesapeake, which Yamagata worked on the previous year, plus some songs that were composed during touring Europe and North America. Yamagata returns to her previous formula of piano and strings. The song "Keep Going" was used in the 2012 film, To Write Love on Her Arms, also known as Renee. The tracks were recorded in The Village, The Bunny Ranch, Crab Trap, Marlay Studio, and Ice Station Zebra Studio in Medford, Massachusetts. The cover artwork is by Jan Zoya, whose artwork impressed Yamagata with its feeling of sadness, nostalgia, and passion.

== Track listing ==
All tracks are written by Rachael Yamagata except where noted.

| No. | Title | Writer(s) | Length |
|---|---|---|---|
| 1. | "Heavyweight" | R. Yamagata, Mike Viola | 3:22 |
| 2. | "Has It Happened Yet" | | 4:38 |
| 3. | "It'll Do" | | 4:22 |
| 4. | "Falling in Love Again" | R. Yamagata, M. Viola | 4:00 |
| 5. | "Nothing Gets By Here" | | 4:49 |
| 6. | "Keep Going" | | 4:34 |
| Total length: | | | 25:40 |

== Personnel ==
=== Musicians ===
- Rachael Yamagata – Vocals, piano, acoustic guitar, Wurlitzer
- John Alagía – Bass, keyboards, electric guitar
- Michael Chaves – Guitar, electric guitar, dulcimer, organ
- Oli Kraus – Violin, strings (written, arranged, performed)
- Adam Popick – Drums, acoustic guitar, electric guitar
- Tom Freund – Bass
- Liz Phair – Electric guitar (track 2)
- Mike Viola – Piano, Wurlitzer
- Victor Indrizzo – Drums
- Madi Diaz – Wurlizter
- Paul Ahlstrand – Strings (arranged)
- Michael Rosenbloom – Violin
- Lisa Crockett – Violin
- Sue Culpo – Viola
- Ron Lowry – Cello

=== Production ===
- John Alagía – Producer, mixing, engineering
- Mike Viola – Producer
- Brad Blackwood – Mastering
- Dan Piscina – Mixing, engineering
- Ducky Carlisle – Mixing, engineering
- Pete Hanlon – Engineering
- Eric Robinson – Engineering
- Michael Chaves – Engineering
- Jan Zoya – Cover art
