= Chesapeake (album) =

Studio album by Rachael Yamagata
- Released: October 11, 2011 (United States)
- Genre: Alternative rock, blues rock
- Length: 43:54
- Label: Frankenfish, Megaforce
- Producer: John Alagía, Rachael Yamagata

Rachael Yamagata chronology
Elephants...Teeth Sinking into Heart (2008)	Chesapeake (2011)	Heavyweight EP (2012)

Singles from Chesapeake
- 1. "Starlight" Released: 2 August 2011; 2. "Even If I Don't" Released: 13 September 2011

Chesapeake is the third studio album by American singer-songwriter Rachael Yamagata. It was released on October 11, 2011, via Frankenfish Records and Megaforce Records in North America.

== Development ==
Recorded in Maryland, Chesapeake is Yamagata's first studio album since 2008's Elephants...Teeth Sinking into Heart. She utilized the fan-funded music platform PledgeMusic to fund the album. She parted ways from her record label, and released it through her own label called Frankenfish Records. She told Steve Baltin of Rolling Stone, "It was really gratifying in that sense because I don’t have the pressures of a major label anymore. In a funny way, I think this might be a more commercial record for me in terms of reaching a broader audience because there was no attempt or requirement to be anything but what we felt like doing in the room." She reunited with John Alagía, the producer of her debut album, Happenstance, to help produce the album.

== Critical reception ==
James Christopher Monger of AllMusic said, "by far Yamagata's most laid-back release to date, offering up ten tracks that run the gamut from lush and languid ("Saturday Morning", "Even If I Don’t") to sultry and spooky ("Starlight") and back again with the easy confidence of an artist on her home turf."

== Covers ==
"You Won't Let Me" was covered by Australian recording artist Karise Eden, who won the first series of The Voice (Australia).

== Track listing ==
No.	Title	Length
1.	"Even If I Don't"	4:10
2.	"Starlight"	4:44
3.	"Saturday Morning"	5:00
4.	"You Won't Let Me"	3:32
5.	"Stick Around"	2:47
6.	"Miles on a Car"	4:14
7.	"The Way It Seems to Go"	4:43
8.	"I Don't Want to Be Your Mother"	3:40
9.	"Full On"	5:22
10.	"Dealbreaker"	5:47
Total length:		43:54

== Personnel ==
- John Alagía – Electric guitar, background vocals, Mixer
- Michael Chavez – Acoustic guitar, electric guitar, mandolin
- Tom Freund – Bass
- Pete Hanlon – Electric guitar
- Sean Hurley – Bass
- Victor Indrizzo – Drums, percussion
- Oli Krauss – Cello, strings
- Zac Rae – Farfisa Organ, electric guitar, keyboards, organ, synthesizer, tack piano, vibraphone
- Eric Robinson – Engineer, Mixer
- Kevin Salem – Dobro, electric guitar, slide guitar
- Mike Viola – Fender Rhodes, acoustic guitar, keyboards, piano, background vocals
- Rachael Yamagata – Acoustic guitar, piano, tambourine, trumpet, vocals
