= List of Single Top 100 number-one singles of 2012 =

List of number one singles in the Natherland in 2012

Throughout all 52 weeks in 2012, 21 songs topped the Mega Single Top 100. The Single Top 100 is a chart composed by MegaCharts based on official physical single sales and legal downloads, and one of the three official Dutch record charts, the two others being the Dutch Top 40 and the Mega Top 50. The first number-one hit on the chart in 2012 was Michel Teló's "Ai se eu te pego!", and the last was will.i.am and Britney Spears' "Scream and Shout".

Artists and acts that had or were featured in at least one song that topped the Mega Single Top 100 that year for at least one week were Michel Teló, Chris Hordijk, Joan Franka, Triggerfinger, Gusttavo Lima, Jan Smit, Gerard Joling, René Froger, Nick & Simon, Asaf Avidan, Sandra van Nieuwland, PSY, Adele, Roos van Erkel, Robbie Williams, Leona Philippo, will.i.am and Britney Spears. Out of these acts, eleven of them, Michel Teló, Chris Hordijk, Joan Franka, Triggerfinger, Gusttavo Lima, Asaf Avidan, Sandra van Nieuwland, Psy, Roos van Erkel, Leona Philippo and will.i.am, achieved their first number-one single on the chart that year, either as lead or featured artist. Sandra van Nieuwland had the most number one hits, achieving five singles that topped. The other artist to have more than one number-one hit was Jan Smit with 3 songs. 18 singles that topped the chart in 2012 were solo songs, while three others were collaborations. "Ai se eu te pego!" was the best-performing single of that year, topping the Single Top 100's 2012 year-end chart.

== Chart history ==
Issue date(s)	Song	Artist(s)
7–14 January	"Ai se eu te pego!"	Michel Teló
21 January	"Time After Time"	Chris Hordijk
28 January–25 February	"Ai se eu te pego!"	Michel Teló
3 March	"You and Me"	Joan Franka
10 March–5 May	"I Follow Rivers"	Triggerfinger
12–26 May	"Balada"	Gusttavo Lima
2–9 June	"Echte vrienden"	Jan Smit and Gerard Joling
16 June	"Samen"	Rene Froger
23–30 June	"Echte vrienden"	Jan Smit and Gerard Joling
7 July–4 August	"Balada"	Rene Froger
11–18 August	"Alles overwinnen"	Nick & Simon
25 August	"One Day / Reckoning Song (Wankelmut Rmx)"	Asaf Avidan
1 September	"More"	Sandra van Nieuwland
8 September	"Altijd daar"	Jan Smit
15–22 September	"One Day / Reckoning Song (Wankelmut Rmx)"	Asaf Avidan
29 September–6 October	"Gangnam Style"	PSY
13–20 October	"Skyfall"	Adele
27 October	"Sla je armen om me heen"	Jan Smit and Roos van Erkel
3 November	"Skyfall"	Adele
10 November	"Sla je armen om me heen"	Jan Smit and Roos van Erkel
17 November	"Candy"	Robbie Williams
24 November	"Keep Your Head Up"	Sandra van Nieuwland
1 December	"Beggin'"	Sandra van Nieuwland
8 December	"New Age"	Sandra van Nieuwland
15 December	"Could You Be Loved"	Leona Philippo
22 December	"Venus"	Sandra van Nieuwland
29 December	"Scream and Shout"	will.i.am featuring Britney Spears

== See also ==
- 2012 in music
- List of Dutch Top 40 number-one singles of 2012
