= List of top 25 albums for 2012 in Australia =

Top 25 albums of 2012 < 2011 2013 >

Other Australian top charts for 2012
- top 25 singles
- Triple J Hottest 100

Australian number-one charts of 2012
- albums
- singles
- urban singles
- dance singles
- club tracks
- digital tracks

The following lists the top 25 albums of 2012 in Australia from the Australian Recording Industry Association (ARIA) End of Year Albums Chart.

#	Title	Artist	Highest pos. reached	Weeks at No. 1
1.	The Truth About Love	Pink	1	5 (Note: The Truth About Love debuted at number one on the ARIA Albums Chart on 24 September 2012. It stayed at its peak position for five consecutive weeks.)
2.	Up All Night	One Direction	1	5 (Note: Up All Night peaked at number one on the ARIA Albums Chart on 9 April 2012. It stayed at its peak position for five consecutive weeks.)
3.	21	Adele	1	32 (Note: 21 peaked at number one on the ARIA Albums Chart on 9 January 2012. It stayed at its peak position for nine weeks.)
4.	Christmas	Michael Bublé	1	9 (Note: Christmas peaked at number one on the ARIA Albums Chart on 10 December 2012. It stayed at its peak position for five consecutive weeks.)
5.	+	Ed Sheeran	1	1 (Note: + peaked at number one on the ARIA Albums Chart on 13 August 2012. It stayed at its peak position for one week.)
6.	My Journey	Karise Eden	1	6 (Note: My Journey debuted at number one on the ARIA Albums Chart on 2 July 2012. It stayed at its peak position for six consecutive weeks.)
7.	Red	Taylor Swift	1	3 (Note: Red debuted at number one on the ARIA Albums Chart on 29 October 2012. It stayed at its peak position for three consecutive weeks)
8.	Take Me Home	One Direction	1	2 (Note: Take Me Home debuted at number one on the ARIA Albums Chart on 19 November 2012. It stayed at its peak position for two consecutive weeks)
9.	Armageddon	Guy Sebastian	1	1 (Note: Armageddon peaked at number one on the ARIA Albums Chart on 3 December 2012. It stayed at its peak position for one week.)
10.	Birdy	Birdy	1	1 (Note: Birdy peaked at number one on the ARIA Albums Chart on 3 September 2012. It stayed at its peak position for one week.)
11.	El Camino	The Black Keys	3	
12.	Babel	Mumford & Sons	2	
13.	Drinking from the Sun	Hilltop Hoods	1	2 (Note: Drinking From the Sun debuted at number one on the ARIA Albums Chart on 3 September 2012. It stayed at its peak position for two consecutive weeks.)
14.	Born to Die	Lana Del Rey	1	1 (Note: Born to Die peaked at number one on the ARIA Albums Chart on 13 February 2012. It stayed at its peak position for one week.)
15.	The Sapphires: Original Motion Picture Soundtrack	Soundtrack	1	2 (Note: The Sapphires peaked at number one on the ARIA Albums Chart on 20 August 2012. It stayed at its peak position for two consecutive weeks.)
16.	Ceremonials	Florence and the Machine	1	1 (Note: Ceremonials debuted at number one on the ARIA Albums Chart on 7 November 2011. It stayed at its peak position for one week.)
17	Falling & Flying	360	4	
18	Bangarang	Skrillex	4	
19	The Story So Far	Keith Urban	1	1 (Note: The Story So Far debuted at number one on the ARIA Albums Chart on 21 May 2012. It stayed at its peak position for one week.)
20	Merry Christmas, Baby	Rod Stewart	3	
21	Mylo Xyloto	Coldplay	1	1 (Note: Mylo Xyloto debuted at number one on the ARIA Albums Chart on 31 October 2011. It stayed at its peak position for one week.)
22	The Ol' Razzle Dazzle	Missy Higgins	1	2 (Note: The Ol' Razzle Dazzle debuted at number one on the ARIA Albums Chart on 11 June 2012. It stayed at its peak position for two consecutive weeks.)
23	Mythology	Bee Gees	6	
24	Overexposed	Maroon 5	4	
25	Doo-Wops & Hooligans	Bruno Mars	2	

Peak chart positions from 2012 are from the ARIA Charts, overall position on the End of Year Chart is calculated by the ARIA, based on the number of weeks and position that the records reach within the Top 100 albums chart for each week during 2012.
