= 2012 in Irish music =

This is a summary of the year 2012 in the Irish music industry.

== Summary ==
- 11–14 January – Ireland is the "Spotlight Country" at the Eurosonic Festival.
- 11 January – the shortlist for the Choice Music Prize was announced.
- 8 March – the Choice Music Prize was awarded at the Olympia Theatre.
- 17 May – Guns N' Roses played The O2.
- 2–4 June – Forbidden Fruit 2012 took place at the Royal Hospital Kilmainham.
- 22–23 June – Westlife played Croke Park, in their final ever shows.
- 23–24 June – the inaugural Westport Festival of Music and Performing Arts took place at Westport House.
- 26 June – Red Hot Chili Peppers played Croke Park, with support from Noel Gallagher.
- 30 June
- Aslan played Tallaght Stadium.
- Oxegen, usually held at Punchestown Racecourse in July, did not take place for the first time since its inception in 2004.
- 5 July – The Stone Roses played Phoenix Park as part of their Reunion Tour. The Irish Independent described it as "one of the most anticipated gigs of the year."
- 7 July – Swedish House Mafia Phoenix Park concert
- 17 July – Bruce Springsteen performed at the RDS.
- 24 July – the entertainer Madonna played Dublin's Aviva Stadium as part of her world tour.
- 23 August – Kasabian and Noel Gallagher performed an outdoor concert at Marlay Park. There was high security following the Swedish House Mafia Phoenix Park concert disaster of the previous month. Sound problems marred Noel Gallagher's performance, forcing him off the stage as he attempted to finish his first song.
- 24 August – David Guetta performed at Marlay Park.
- 25 August – Van Morrison, Tom Jones and Don Baker/Sinéad O'Connor performed an outdoor concert at Marlay Park.
- 31 August–2 September – the Electric Picnic took place at Stradbally.
- 13 September – Paddy Moloney, founding member of The Chieftains, was given Mexico's Ohtli Award, the country's highest cultural award.
- 14 September – Robbie Williams performed at Dublin's O2 in honour of his vow to perform a one-off concert for his Irish fans after technical hitches destroyed his 2006 performance at Croke Park.

== See also ==
- 2012 in Ireland
- 2012 in music
- 2011 in Irish music
