= List of number-one albums of 2012 (Australia) =

ARIA Charts number-one albums of 2012 < 2011 2013 >

Other Australian number-one charts of 2012
- singles
- urban singles
- dance singles
- club tracks
- digital tracks

Top Australian singles and albums of 2012
- Triple J Hottest 100
- top 25 singles
- top 25 albums

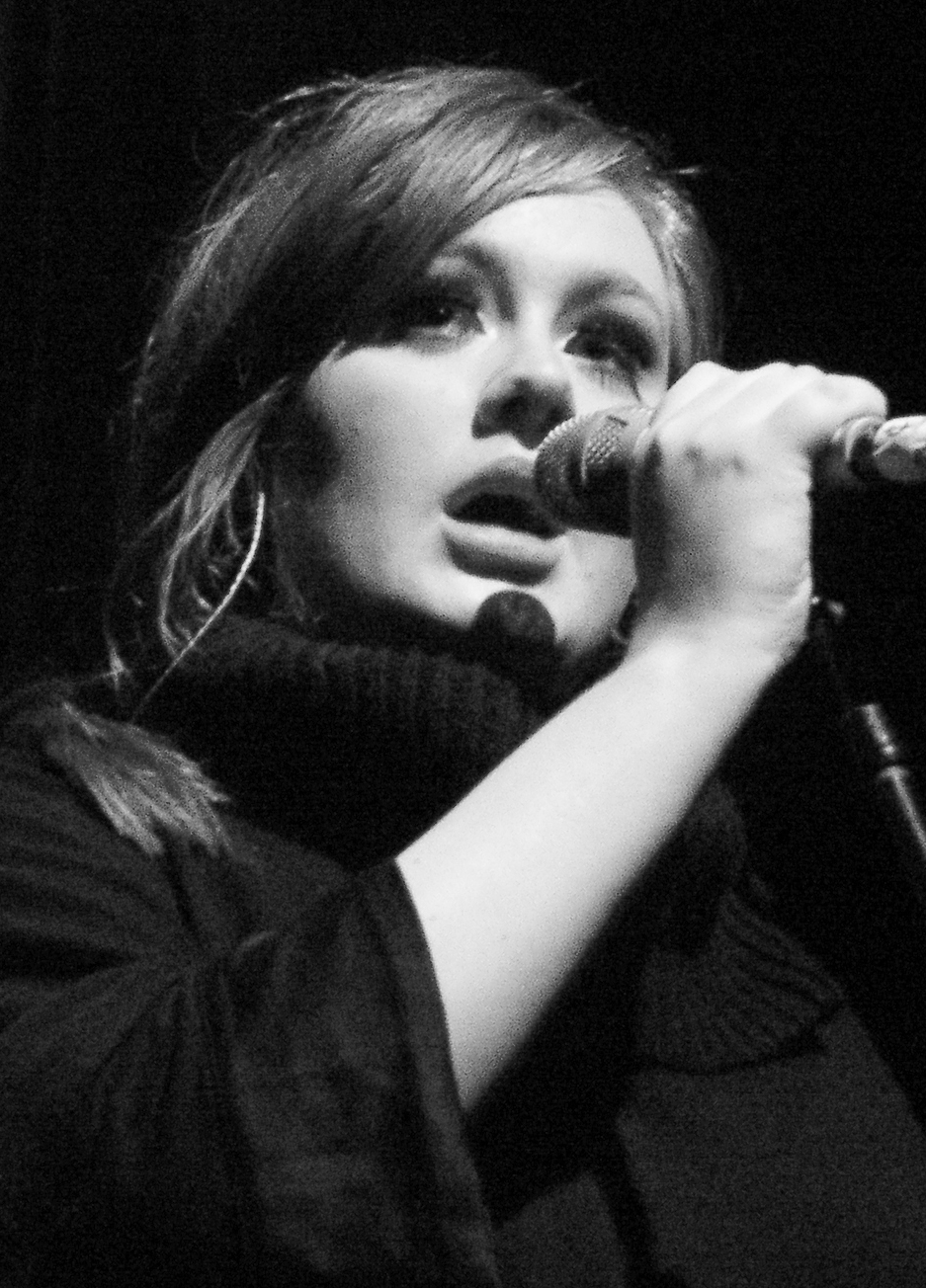
Adele's 21 was the longest-running number-one album of 2012, topping the ARIA Albums Chart for nine weeks.

The ARIA Albums Chart ranks the best-performing albums and extended plays in Australia. Its data, published by the Australian Recording Industry Association, is based collectively on each album and EP's weekly physical and digital sales. In 2012, twenty-two albums claimed the top spot, including Adele's 21 and Michael Bublé's Christmas, both of which started their peak positions in 2011. Ten acts achieved their first number-one album in Australia: Foster the People, Lana Del Rey, One Direction, Keith Urban, The Temper Trap, John Mayer, Karise Eden, Ed Sheeran, Birdy and The Amity Affliction.

One Direction earned two number-one albums during the year for Up All Night and Take Me Home. Taylor Swift's Red topped the charts for three consecutive weeks becoming her second number-one album on the chart. 21 was the longest-running number-one album of 2012, having topped the ARIA Albums Chart for nine weeks. Eden's My Journey topped the chart for six consecutive weeks, while Michael Bublé's Christmas, One Direction's Up All Night and Pink's The Truth About Love each spent five weeks at the number-one spot.

== Chart history ==
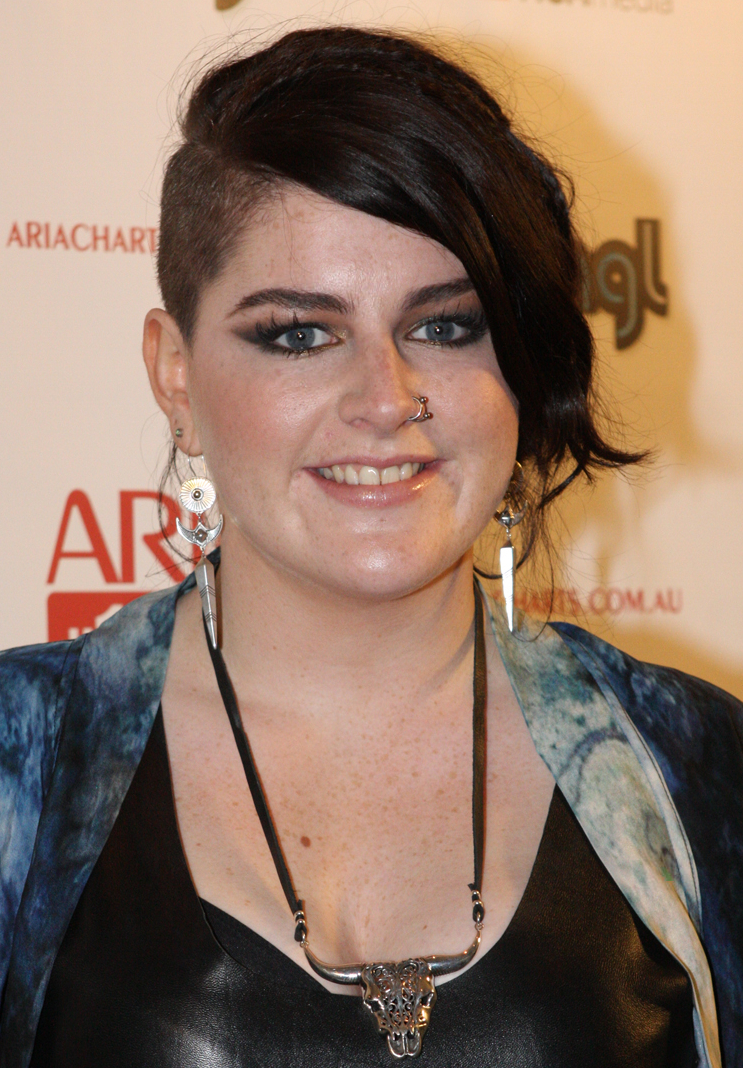
Karise Eden's My Journey topped the ARIA Albums Chart for six consecutive weeks, becoming her first number-one album on the chart.

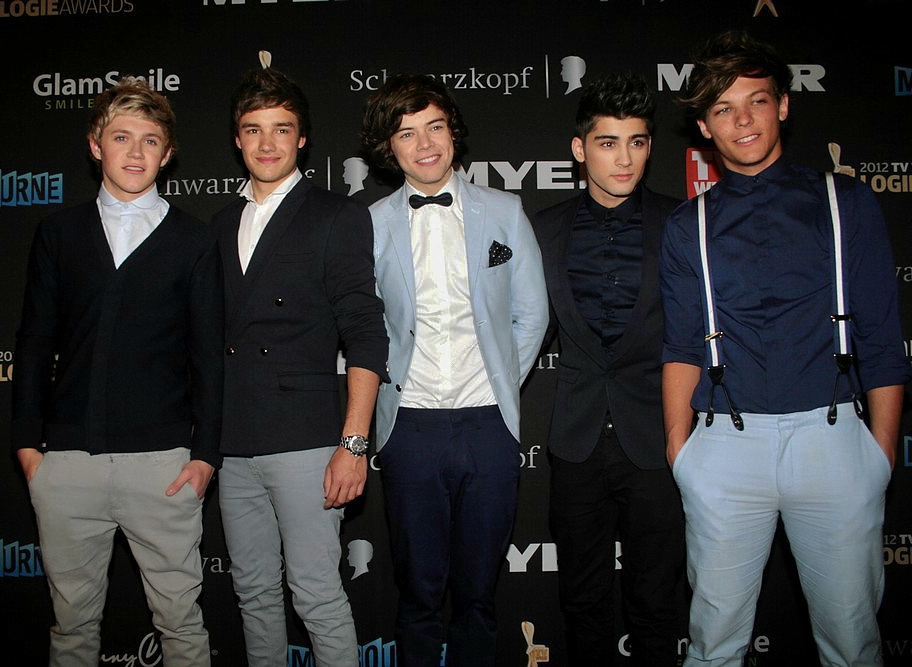
One Direction earned their first and second number-one album when Up All Night and Take Me Home both topped the ARIA Albums Chart. Up All Night spent five consecutive weeks at number one.

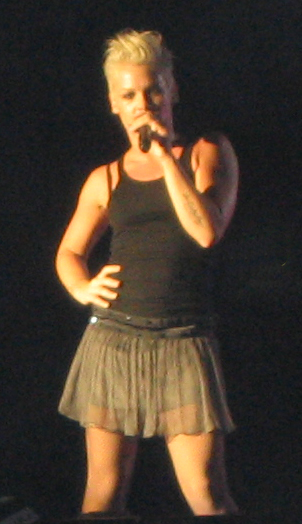
Pink's The Truth About Love topped the ARIA Albums Chart for five consecutive weeks, becoming her fourth number-one album on the chart.

Key
The yellow background indicates the #1 album on ARIA's End of Year Albums Chart of 2012.

Date	Album	Artist(s)	Ref.
2 January	Christmas	Michael Bublé	
9 January	21	Adele	
16 January	21	Adele	
23 January	21	Adele	
30 January	21	Adele	
6 February	Torches	Foster the People	
13 February	Born to Die	Lana Del Rey	
20 February	21	Adele	
27 February	21	Adele	
5 March	21	Adele	
12 March	21	Adele	
19 March	Drinking from the Sun	Hilltop Hoods	
26 March	Drinking from the Sun	Hilltop Hoods	
2 April	MDNA	Madonna	
9 April	Up All Night	One Direction	
16 April	Up All Night	One Direction	
23 April	Up All Night	One Direction	
30 April	Up All Night	One Direction	
7 May	Up All Night	One Direction	
14 May	21	Adele	
21 May	The Story So Far	Keith Urban	
28 May	The Temper Trap	The Temper Trap	
4 June	Born and Raised	John Mayer	
11 June	The Ol' Razzle Dazzle	Missy Higgins	
18 June	The Ol' Razzle Dazzle	Missy Higgins	
25 June	Believe	Justin Bieber	
2 July	My Journey	Karise Eden	
9 July	My Journey	Karise Eden	
16 July	My Journey	Karise Eden	
23 July	My Journey	Karise Eden	
30 July	My Journey	Karise Eden	
6 August	My Journey	Karise Eden	
13 August	+	Ed Sheeran	
20 August	The Sapphires	Various artists	
27 August	The Sapphires	Various artists	
3 September	Birdy	Birdy	
10 September	North	Matchbox Twenty	
17 September	Chasing Ghosts	The Amity Affliction	
24 September	The Truth About Love	Pink	
1 October	The Truth About Love	Pink	
8 October	The Truth About Love	Pink	
15 October	The Truth About Love	Pink	
22 October	The Truth About Love	Pink	
29 October	Red	Taylor Swift	
5 November	Red	Taylor Swift	
12 November	Red	Taylor Swift	
19 November	Take Me Home	One Direction	
26 November	Take Me Home	One Direction	
3 December	Armageddon	Guy Sebastian	
10 December	Christmas	Michael Bublé	
17 December	Christmas	Michael Bublé	
24 December	Christmas	Michael Bublé	
31 December	Christmas	Michael Bublé	

== Number-one artists ==
Position	Artist	Weeks at No. 1
1	Adele	9
2	One Direction	7
3	Karise Eden	6
4	Michael Bublé	5
4	Pink	5
5	Taylor Swift	3
6	Hilltop Hoods	2
6	Various artists	2
7	Foster the People	1
7	Lana Del Rey	1
7	Madonna	1
7	Keith Urban	1
7	The Temper Trap	1
7	John Mayer	1
7	Missy Higgins	1
7	Justin Bieber	1
7	Ed Sheeran	1
7	Birdy	1
7	Matchbox Twenty	1
7	The Amity Affliction	1
7	Guy Sebastian	1

== See also ==
- 2012 in music
- List of number-one singles of 2012 (Australia)
