= Heavenly Sounds =

Series of concert tours in Australia

Heavenly Sounds is an ongoing concert series that presents contemporary secular music in churches and cathedrals around Australia. It is co-presented by artist management company One Louder and booking agency Artist Voice.

The first tour took place in November/December 2011 and featured Australian indie folk supergroup Seeker Lover Keeper (featuring Sarah Blasko, Holly Throsby and Sally Seltmann), with opening acts Henry Wagons and Laura Jean Shows took place in Brisbane, Sydney, Newcastle, Canberra, Melbourne, Hobart, Perth and Adelaide.

The second tour was in June 2012 and featured Lisa Mitchell and Georgia Fair who performed in Newcastle, Sydney, Brisbane, Melbourne, Adelaide and Perth.

Subsequent tours have included Julia Stone, The Civil Wars, Beth Orton, Michael Kiwanuka, Kate Miller-Heidke, Laura Marling, and Sarah Blasko The event co-directors Bill Cullen and Brett Murrihy created the Heavenly Sounds concept to offer something unique to both artists and audiences.
