= The Corporation (American band) =

American psychedelic rock band

- Cover of the band's debut album

Background information
- Origin: Milwaukee, United States
- Genres: Psychedelic rock
- Years active: 1968–70
- Past members: Kenneth Bernard Berdoll; John Alexander Kondos; Nicholas Alexander Kondos; Patrick Daniel McCarthy; Daniel Vincent Peil; Gerard Jon Smith

The Corporation were an American psychedelic rock band, active in the 1960s.

== History ==
The Corporation formed in 1968, when the Kondos brothers joined up with members of a band called Eastern Mean Time, and they started appearing at the Galaxy Club, located in Cudahy, Wisconsin, a southeastern suburb of Milwaukee. A few months later, they were discovered by Capitol Records executives, while playing at The Bastille club.

The Corporation members were Daniel Peil (born Daniel Vincent Peil in Superior, Wisconsin; September 26, 1942 – January 3, 2012) on lead vocals; Gerard Jon Smith on lead guitar and backing Vocals; John Alexander Kondos on guitar, flute, harp, piano, and backing vocals; his brother Nicholas Alexander "Sandie" Kondos on drums and backing vocals; Kenneth Bernard Berdoll on bass and backing vocals; and Patrick Daneil McCarthy on keyboards and trombone.

Their debut, self-named album was a regional hit in early 1969 and was in the Billboard Top LP Chart for four weeks, while hitting number three in Milwaukee and doing relatively well in Little Rock, Arkansas. The whole second side was taken up by The Corporation's version of John Coltrane's "India."

Except for appearances in Chicago and St.Paul, the band remained local, without television appearances or corporate promotion. A European tour was in the planning stages, but it fell apart when disagreements with Capitol Records surfaced.

Within two years, The Corporation made two further albums, Hassels In My Mind and Get On Our Swing, on the Age Of Aquarius label, a custom rock imprint of Cuca Records. Cuca was a Wisconsin recording studio and pressing plant whose output was subsequently anthologised by Ace Records in a 3-volume CD.

The band broke up in 1970.

== Aftermath and legacy ==
Guitar player John Alexander Kondos in the 1970s and 1980s toured the club and bar circuit with various groupings of musicians such as John Kondos and his Fabulous Galaxies, Eastman Blues Band, and others. He died in June 2007 from cancer.

Vocalist Daniel Vincent Peil, in August 1979, lost his wife and all their three children in a house fire. In the early 1980s, he started singing with various semi-pro groups, such as Dan Peil and Friends, and toured throughout Minnesota, North and South Dakota and Wisconsin. He married briefly in the mid 1980s and had two children. In 1988, after divorcing his second wife, he started a relationship with Marlene Lindgren, and, in 1991 while in Denver, Colorado, they had a son, Daniel. Peil returned to Minnesota, with his family, settling on a farm there. He died on January 3, 2012, at age 69.

In the years after the band's demise, The Corporation's first, eponymous LP acquired a large audience for its "great musicianship" and "original melodies."

== See also ==
- Music of Wisconsin
