= You Won't Let Me =

2011 song by Rachael Yamagata

Single by Rachael Yamagata

from the album Chesapeake
- Genre: Alternative rock
- Length: 3:32
- Label: Frankenfish
- Songwriters: Rachael Yamagata, Mike Viola
- Producer: Indaba Music

"You Won't Let Me" is a song by American recording artist Rachael Yamagata from her third studio album Chesapeake (2011). It was written by Yamagata and Mike Viola, with Indaba Music producing the track. Described as a "pleading ballad", the song is about "showing someone how to laugh".

== Karise Eden cover version ==
"You Won't Let Me"

Single by Karise Eden

from the album My Journey
- Released: 19 June 2012
- Recorded: 2012
- Genre: Pop
- Length: 3:34
- Label: Universal
- Songwriters: Rachael Yamagata, Mike Viola

Karise Eden singles chronology
"You Won't Let Me" (2012)	"Threads of Silence" (2013)

"You Won't Let Me" is the debut single by Australian singer-songwriter Karise Eden who won the first season of The Voice (Australia). It was released as a digital download in Australia on 19 June 2012 as the lead single from her debut studio album My Journey (2012), on 19 June 2012. The song peaked at number five on the ARIA Singles Charts.

=== Track listing ===
Digital download

1. "You Won't Let Me" – 3:34

CD single

1. "You Won't Let Me" – 3:34
2. "Nothings Real But Love – The Voice Performance" – 2:55
3. "You Won’t Let Me – Instrumental" – 3:34

=== Charts ===
Chart (2012)	Peak position
Australia (ARIA)	5

=== Certifications ===
Country	Certifications
Australia	Gold

=== Release history ===
Region	Date	Format	Label
Australia	19 June 2012	Digital download	Universal Music Australia
Australia	21 June 2012	CD single	Universal Music Australia
