= List of number-one digital tracks of 2012 (Australia) =

ARIA Charts number-one digital tracks of 2012 < 2011 2013 >

Other Australian number-one charts of 2012
- albums
- singles
- urban singles
- dance singles
- club tracks

Top Australian singles and albums of 2012
- Triple J Hottest 100
- top 25 singles
- top 25 albums

The ARIA Digital Track Chart is a chart that ranks the best-performing digital tracks singles of Australia. It is published by Australian Recording Industry Association (ARIA), an organisation who collect music data for the weekly ARIA Charts. To be eligible to appear on the chart, the recording must be a single not an EP and only paid downloads counted from downloadable outlets.

== Chart history ==
Key
†	Indicates number-one digital single of 2012

Issue date	Song	Artist(s)	Reference
2 January	"Sexy And I Know It"	LMFAO	
9 January	"Pumped Up Kicks"	Foster the People	
16 January	"Pumped Up Kicks"	Foster the People	
23 January	"Wild Ones"	Flo Rida featuring Sia	
30 January	"Wild Ones"	Flo Rida featuring Sia	
6 February	"Wild Ones"	Flo Rida featuring Sia	
13 February	"Wild Ones"	Flo Rida featuring Sia	
20 February	"Wild Ones"	Flo Rida featuring Sia	
27 February	"Wild Ones"	Flo Rida featuring Sia	
5 March	"Ass Back Home"	Gym Class Heroes featuring Neon Hitch	
12 March	"We Are Young"	Fun featuring Janelle Monáe	
19 March	"We Are Young"	Fun featuring Janelle Monáe	
26 March	"We Are Young"	Fun featuring Janelle Monáe	
2 April	"Call Me Maybe"†	Carly Rae Jepsen	
9 April	"Call Me Maybe"†	Carly Rae Jepsen	
16 April	"Call Me Maybe"†	Carly Rae Jepsen	
23 April	"Call Me Maybe"†	Carly Rae Jepsen	
30 April	"Call Me Maybe"†	Carly Rae Jepsen	
7 May	"Whistle"	Flo Rida	
14 May	"Whistle"	Flo Rida	
21 May	"Whistle"	Flo Rida	
28 May	"Whistle"	Flo Rida	
4 June	"Whistle"	Flo Rida	
11 June	"Whistle"	Flo Rida	
18 June	"Whistle"	Flo Rida	
25 June	"Stay with Me"	Karise Eden	
2 July	"Whistle"	Flo Rida	
9 July	"Some Nights"	Fun	
16 July	"Blow Me (One Last Kiss)"	Pink	
23 July	"Some Nights"	Fun	
30 July	"Some Nights"	Fun	
6 August	"Boom Boom"	Justice Crew	
13 August	"Boom Boom"	Justice Crew	
20 August	"Battle Scars"	Guy Sebastian featuring Lupe Fiasco	
27 August	"Battle Scars"	Guy Sebastian featuring Lupe Fiasco	
3 September	"Battle Scars"	Guy Sebastian featuring Lupe Fiasco	
10 September	"Battle Scars"	Guy Sebastian featuring Lupe Fiasco	
17 September	"Battle Scars"	Guy Sebastian featuring Lupe Fiasco	
24 September	"Battle Scars"	Guy Sebastian featuring Lupe Fiasco	
1 October	"Gangnam Style"	Psy	
8 October	"Gangnam Style"	Psy	
15 October	"Gangnam Style"	Psy	
22 October	"Gangnam Style"	Psy	
29 October	"Gangnam Style"	Psy	
5 November	"Gangnam Style"	Psy	
12 November	"Don't You Worry Child"	Swedish House Mafia	
19 November	"Don't You Worry Child"	Swedish House Mafia	
26 November	"What You've Done to Me"	Samantha Jade	
3 December	"Thrift Shop"	Macklemore & Ryan Lewis featuring Wanz	
10 December	"Thrift Shop"	Macklemore & Ryan Lewis featuring Wanz	
17 December	"Thrift Shop"	Macklemore & Ryan Lewis featuring Wanz	
24 December	"Scream & Shout"	Will.i.am featuring Britney Spears	
31 December	"Thrift Shop"	Macklemore & Ryan Lewis featuring Wanz	

== Number-one artists ==
Position	Artist	Weeks at No. 1
1	Flo Rida	14
2	Fun	6
2	Guy Sebastian	6
2	Lupe Fiasco (as featuring)	6
2	Psy	6
2	Sia (as featuring)	6
3	Carly Rae Jepsen	5
4	Macklemore & Ryan Lewis	4
4	Wanz (as featuring)	4
5	Janelle Monáe (as featuring)	3
6	Justice Crew	2
6	Foster the People	2
6	Swedish House Mafia	2
7	Britney Spears (as featuring)	1
7	Gym Class Heroes	1
7	Karise Eden	1
7	LMFAO	1
7	Neon Hitch (as featuring)	1
7	Pink	1
7	Samantha Jade	1
7	Will.i.am	1

== See also ==
- 2012 in music
- List of number-one singles of 2012 (Australia)
