= List of number-one dance singles of 2012 (Australia) =

ARIA Charts number-one dance singles of 2012 < 2011 2013 >

Other Australian number-one charts of 2012
- albums
- singles
- urban singles
- club tracks
- digital tracks

Top Australian singles and albums of 2012
- Triple J Hottest 100
- top 25 singles
- top 25 albums

The ARIA Dance Chart is a chart that ranks the best-performing dance singles of Australia. It is published by Australian Recording Industry Association (ARIA), an organisation who collect music data for the weekly ARIA Charts. To be eligible to appear on the chart, the recording must be a single, and be "predominantly of a dance nature, or with a featured track of a dance nature, or included in the ARIA Club Chart or a comparable overseas chart".

== Chart history ==
| Issue date | Song | Artist(s) | Reference |
|---|---|---|---|
| 2 January | "Sexy and I Know It" | LMFAO | |
| 9 January | "Sexy and I Know It" | LMFAO | |
| 16 January | "Sexy and I Know It" | LMFAO | |
| 23 January | "Turn Me On" | David Guetta featuring Nicki Minaj | |
| 30 January | "Hey Hey Hey (Pop Another Bottle)" | Laurent Wery featuring Swift K.I.D. & Dev | |
| 6 February | "Hey Hey Hey (Pop Another Bottle)" | Laurent Wery featuring Swift K.I.D. & Dev | |
| 13 February | "Hey Hey Hey (Pop Another Bottle)" | Laurent Wery featuring Swift K.I.D. & Dev | |
| 20 February | "Hey Hey Hey (Pop Another Bottle)" | Laurent Wery featuring Swift K.I.D. & Dev | |
| 27 February | "Turn Me On" | David Guetta featuring Nicki Minaj | |
| 5 March | "Hey Hey Hey (Pop Another Bottle)" | Laurent Wery featuring Swift K.I.D. & Dev | |
| 12 March | "Bangarang" | Skrillex | |
| 19 March | "Bangarang" | Skrillex | |
| 26 March | "Bangarang" | Skrillex | |
| 2 April | "Bangarang" | Skrillex | |
| 9 April | "Bangarang" | Skrillex | |
| 16 April | "Bangarang" | Skrillex | |
| 23 April | "Bangarang" | Skrillex | |
| 30 April | "Bangarang" | Skrillex | |
| 7 May | "Bangarang" | Skrillex | |
| 14 May | "Do It Like That" | Ricki-Lee | |
| 21 May | "Do It Like That" | Ricki-Lee | |
| 28 May | "Do It Like That" | Ricki-Lee | |
| 4 June | "Timebomb" | Kylie Minogue | |
| 11 June | "Do It Like That" | Ricki-Lee | |
| 18 June | "This Is Love" | Will.I.Am featuring Eva Simons | |
| 25 June | "This Is Love" | Will.I.Am featuring Eva Simons | |
| 2 July | "This Is Love" | Will.I.Am featuring Eva Simons | |
| 9 July | "Feel the Love" | Rudimental featuring John Newman | |
| 16 July | "Feel the Love" | Rudimental featuring John Newman | |
| 23 July | "Feel the Love" | Rudimental featuring John Newman | |
| 30 July | "Feel the Love" | Rudimental featuring John Newman | |
| 6 August | "Feel the Love" | Rudimental featuring John Newman | |
| 13 August | "Feel the Love" | Rudimental featuring John Newman | |
| 20 August | "Feel the Love" | Rudimental featuring John Newman | |
| 27 August | "Feel the Love" | Rudimental featuring John Newman | |
| 3 September | "She Wolf (Falling to Pieces)" | David Guetta featuring Sia | |
| 10 September | "We'll Be Coming Back" | Calvin Harris featuring Example | |
| 17 September | "We'll Be Coming Back" | Calvin Harris featuring Example | |
| 24 September | "We'll Be Coming Back" | Calvin Harris featuring Example | |
| 1 October | "We'll Be Coming Back" | Calvin Harris featuring Example | |
| 8 October | "Die Young" | Kesha | |
| 15 October | "Die Young" | Kesha | |
| 22 October | "Sweet Nothing" | Calvin Harris and Florence Welch | |
| 29 October | "Sweet Nothing" | Calvin Harris and Florence Welch | |
| 5 November | "Don't You Worry Child" | Swedish House Mafia | |
| 12 November | "Don't You Worry Child" | Swedish House Mafia | |
| 19 November | "Don't You Worry Child" | Swedish House Mafia | |
| 26 November | "Don't You Worry Child" | Swedish House Mafia | |
| 3 December | "Don't You Worry Child" | Swedish House Mafia | |
| 10 December | "Don't You Worry Child" | Swedish House Mafia | |
| 17 December | "Scream & Shout" | Will.I.Am featuring Britney Spears | |
| 24 December | "Scream & Shout" | Will.I.Am featuring Britney Spears | |
| 31 December | "Scream & Shout" | Will.I.Am featuring Britney Spears | |

== Number-one artists ==
| Position | Artist | Weeks at No. 1 |
|---|---|---|
| 1 | Skrillex | 9 |
| 2 | Rudimental | 8 |
| 2 | John Newman (as featuring) | 8 |
| 3 | Calvin Harris | 6 |
| 3 | Swedish House Mafia | 6 |
| 3 | will.i.am | 6 |
| 4 | Laurent Wery | 5 |
| 4 | Swift K.I.D. | 5 |
| 4 | Dev (as featuring) | 5 |
| 5 | Example | 4 |
| 5 | Ricki-Lee | 4 |
| 6 | Britney Spears (as featuring) | 3 |
| 6 | David Guetta | 3 |
| 6 | Eva Simons (as featuring) | 3 |
| 6 | LMFAO | 3 |
| 7 | Florence Welch (as featuring) | 2 |
| 7 | Kesha | 2 |
| 7 | Nicki Minaj (as featuring) | 2 |
| 8 | Kylie Minogue | 1 |
| 8 | Sia (as featuring) | 1 |

== See also ==
- 2012 in music
- List of number-one singles of 2012 (Australia)
- List of number-one club tracks of 2012 (Australia)
