= List of top 25 singles for 2012 in Australia =

Top 25 singles of 2012 < 2011 2013 >

Other Australian top charts for 2012
- top 25 albums
- Triple J Hottest 100

Australian number-one charts of 2012
- albums
- singles
- urban singles
- dance singles
- club tracks
- digital tracks

The following lists the top 25 singles of 2012 in Australia from the Australian Recording Industry Association (ARIA) end-of-year singles chart.

"Call Me Maybe" by Carly Rae Jepsen was the biggest song of the year, peaking at #1 for 5 weeks.

#	Title	Artist	Highest pos. reached	Weeks at No. 1
1	"Call Me Maybe"	Carly Rae Jepsen	1	5
2	"Gangnam Style"	PSY	1	6
3	"Battle Scars"	Guy Sebastian featuring Lupe Fiasco	1	6
4	"Whistle"	Flo Rida	1	8
5	"Wild Ones"	Flo Rida featuring Sia	1	6
6	"Starships"	Nicki Minaj	2	
7	"Boom Boom"	Justice Crew	1	2
8	"Skinny Love"	Birdy	2	
9	"Thrift Shop"	Macklemore & Ryan Lewis featuring Wanz	1	5
10	"Don't You Worry Child"	Swedish House Mafia featuring John Martin	1	2
11	"Payphone"	Maroon 5 featuring Wiz Khalifa	2	
12	"We Are Young"	Fun featuring Janelle Monáe	1	3
13	"Brother"	Matt Corby	3	
14	"Lego House"	Ed Sheeran	4	
15	"Some Nights"	Fun	1	2
16	"Good Time"	Owl City and Carly Rae Jepsen	5	
17	"What Makes You Beautiful"	One Direction	7	
18	"One More Night"	Maroon 5	2	
19	"We Are Never Ever Getting Back Together"	Taylor Swift	3	
20	"Hall of Fame"	The Script featuring Will.i.am	4	
21	"Bangarang"	Skrillex featuring Sirah	4	
22	"One Thing"	One Direction	3	
23	"Boys like You"	360 featuring Gossling	3	
24	"Paradise"	Coldplay	3	
25	"Earthquake"	Labrinth featuring Tinie Tempah	4	
