= List of number-one singles of 2012 (Australia) =

ARIA Charts number-one singles of 2012 < 2011 2013 >

Other Australian number-one charts of 2012
- albums
- urban singles
- dance singles
- club tracks
- digital tracks

Top Australian singles and albums of 2012
- Triple J Hottest 100
- top 25 singles
- top 25 albums

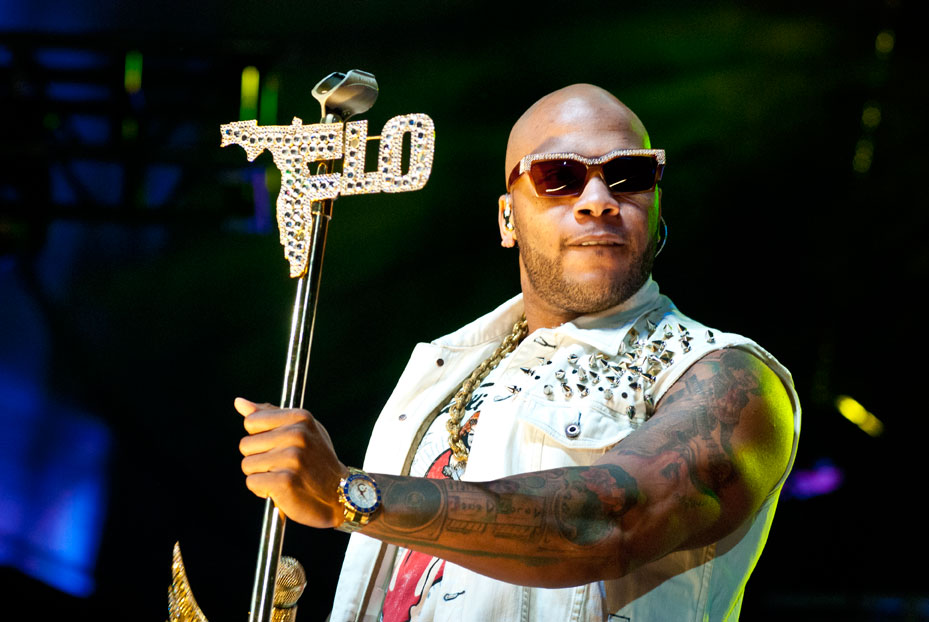
Flo Rida earned his third and fourth number-one single when "Wild Ones" and "Whistle" both topped the ARIA Singles Chart. "Whistle" was the longest-running number-one single of 2012, having topped the chart for eight weeks.

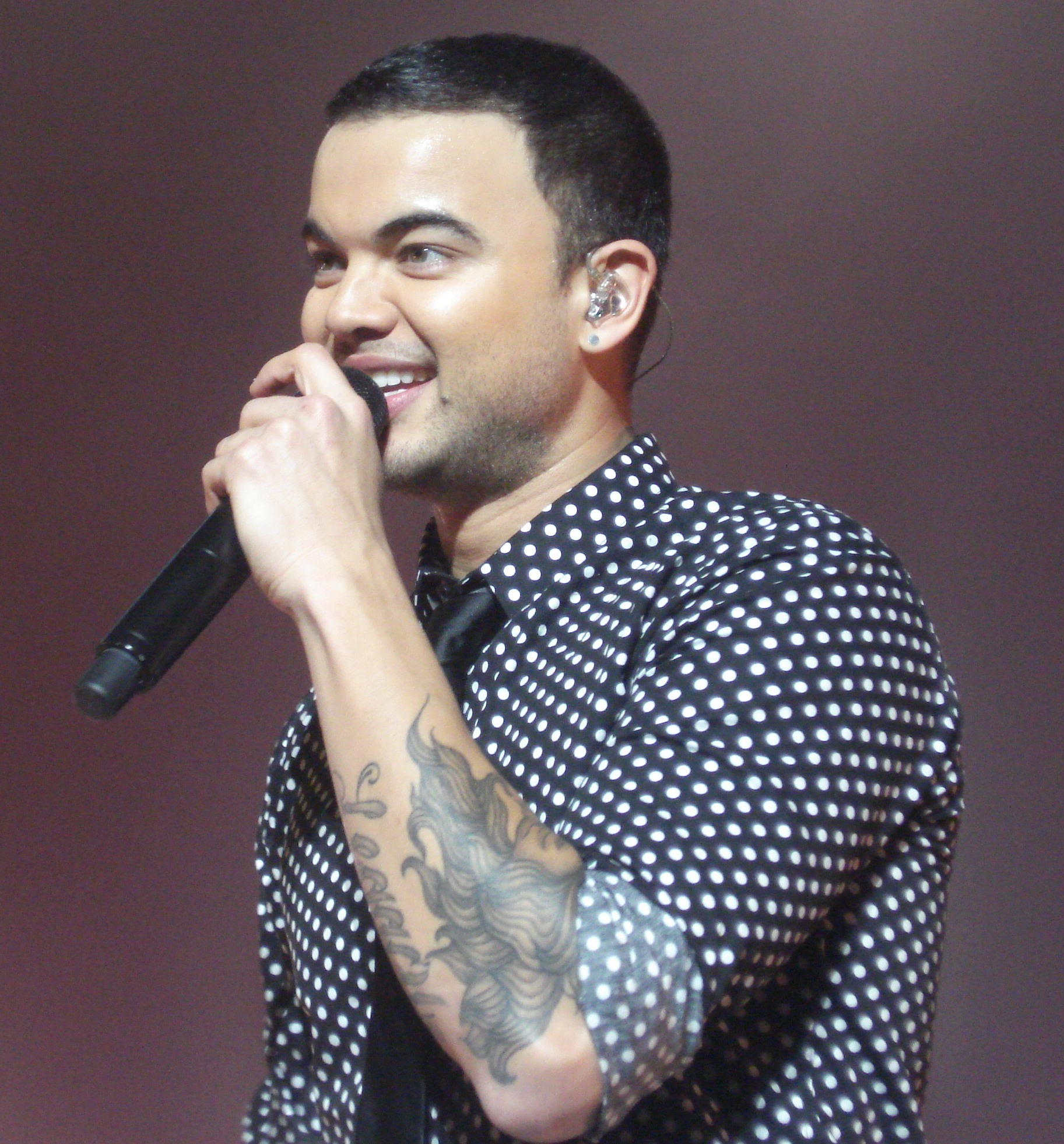
Guy Sebastian earned his sixth number-one single when "Battle Scars" topped the ARIA Singles Chart for six consecutive weeks. He is the only Australian male artist in the chart's history to achieve six number-one singles.

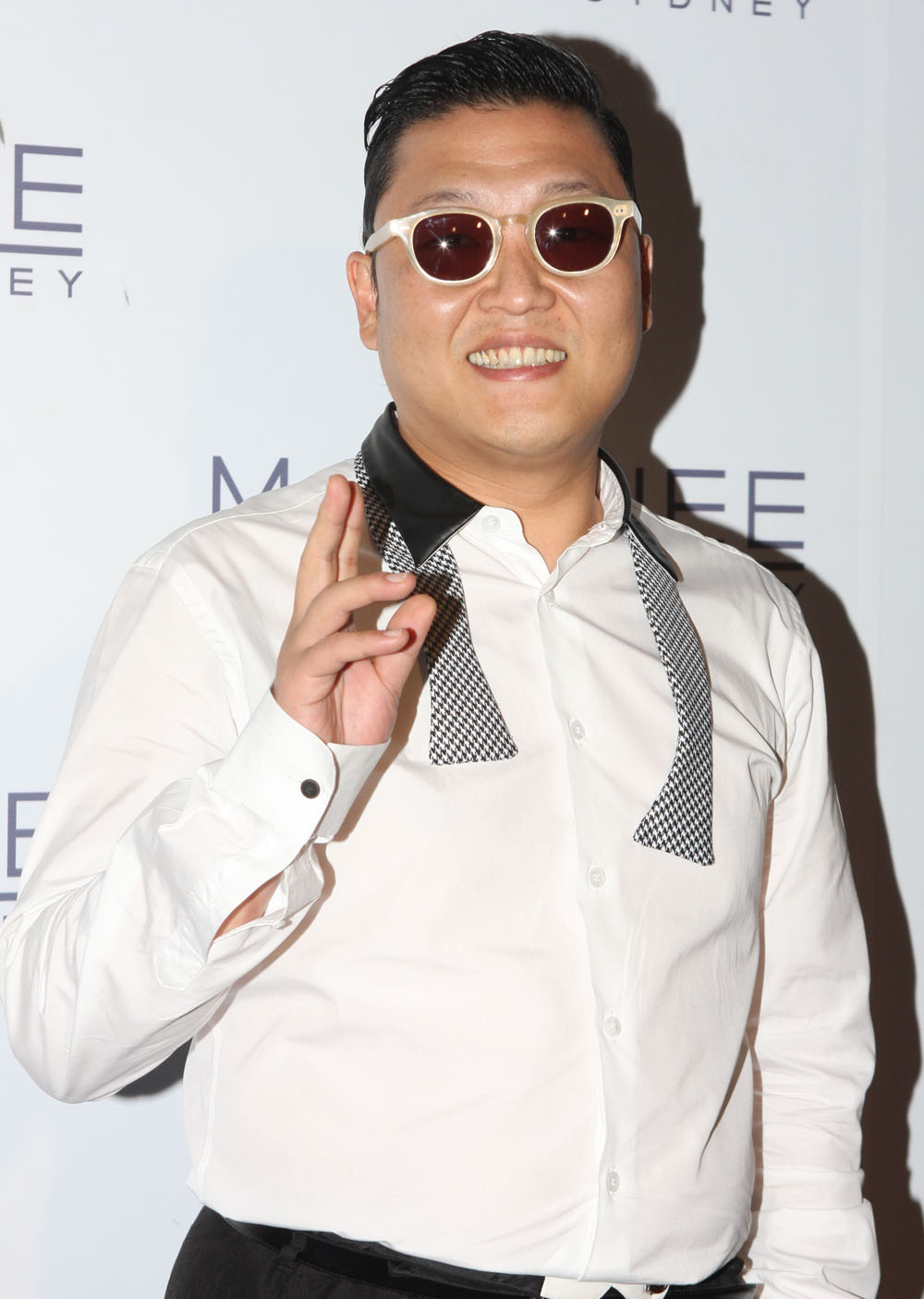
Psy's "Gangnam Style" topped the ARIA Singles Chart for six consecutive weeks, becoming his first number-one single on the chart.

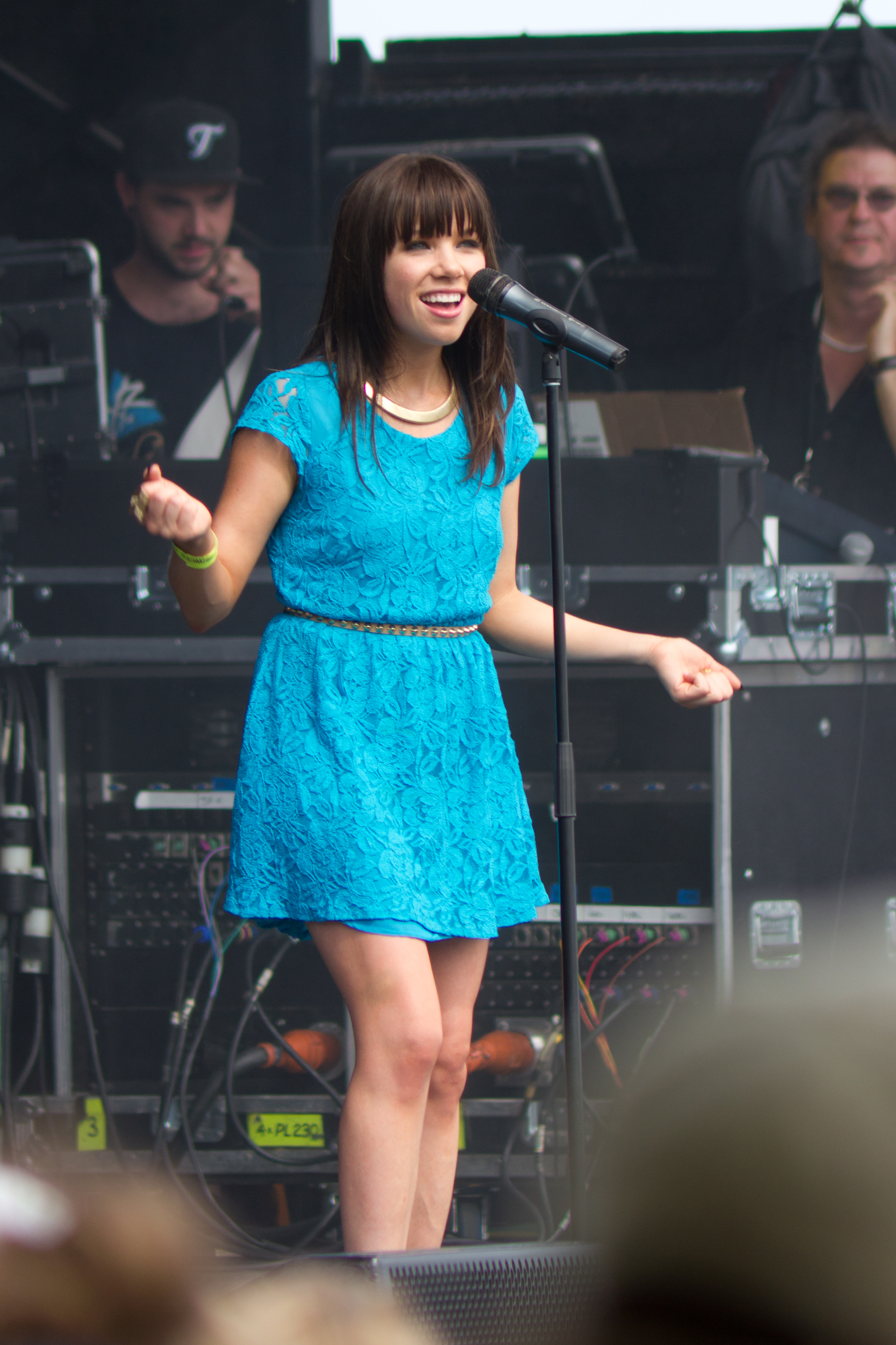
Carly Rae Jepsen's "Call Me Maybe" topped the ARIA Singles Chart for five consecutive weeks, becoming her first number-one single on the chart and the biggest song of 2012 in Australia.

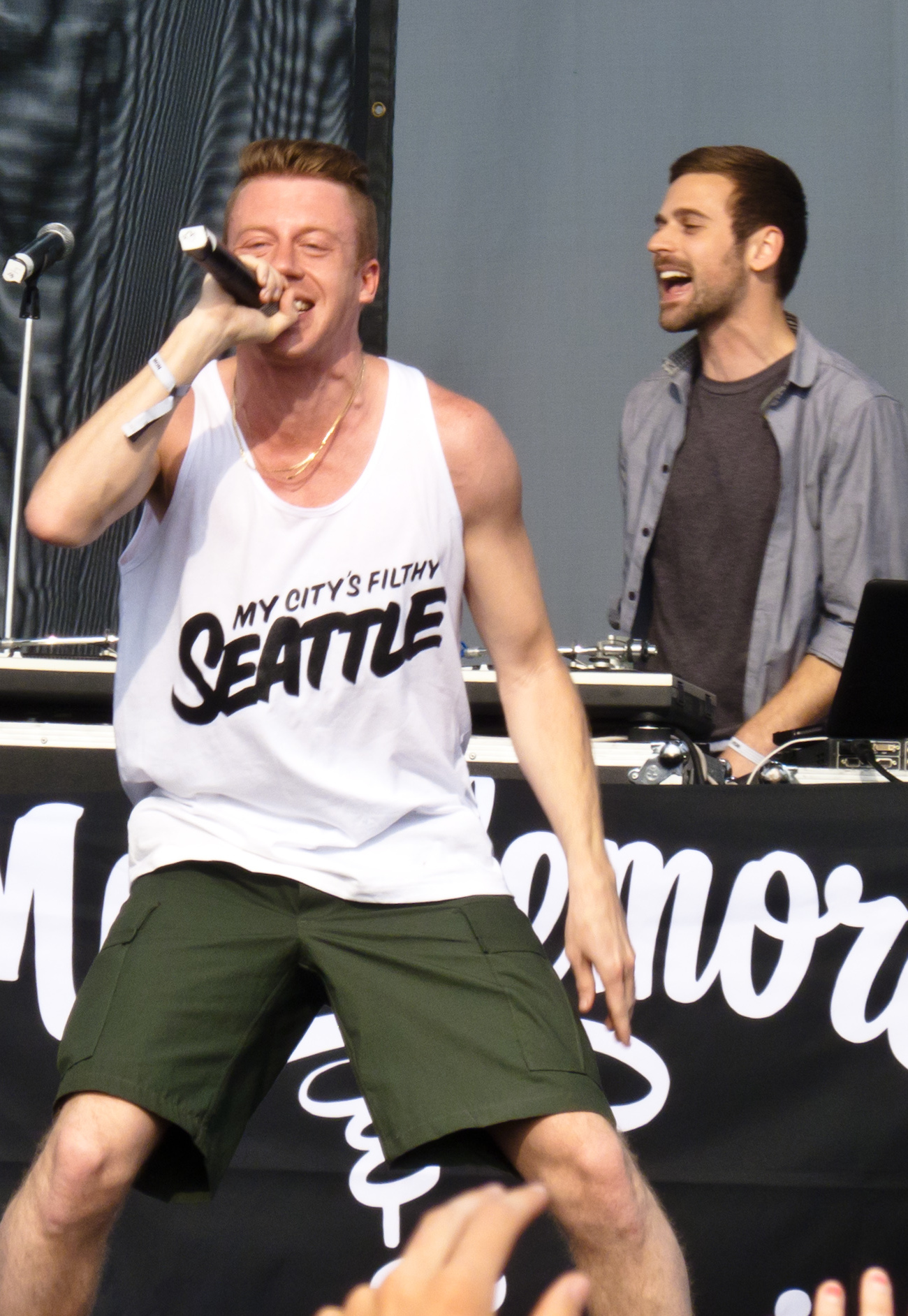
Macklemore & Ryan Lewis's "Thrift Shop" topped the ARIA Singles Chart for five consecutive weeks, becoming their first number-one single on the chart.

The ARIA Singles Chart ranks the best-performing singles in Australia. Its data, published by the Australian Recording Industry Association, is based collectively on each single's weekly physical and digital sales. In 2012, seventeen singles claimed the top spot, including LMFAO's "Sexy and I Know It", which started its peak position in late 2011. Seventeen acts achieved their first number-one single in Australia, either as a lead or featured artist: Foster the People, Sia, Gym Class Heroes, Neon Hitch, Fun, Janelle Monáe, Carly Rae Jepsen, Karise Eden, Justice Crew, Lupe Fiasco, Psy, Swedish House Mafia, John Martin, Samantha Jade, Macklemore & Ryan Lewis and Wanz.

Fun and Flo Rida earned two number-one songs during the year. Flo Rida's "Whistle" was the longest-running number-one single of 2012, having topped the ARIA Singles Chart for eight weeks. Carly Rae Jepsen's "Call Me Maybe" and Macklemore and Ryan Lewis' "Thrift Shop" each topped the chart for five consecutive weeks, while Flo Rida's "Wild Ones", Psy's "Gangnam Style" and Guy Sebastian's "Battle Scars" all stayed at number one for six consecutive weeks. Sebastian is the only Australian male artist in the chart's history to achieve six number-one singles.

== Chart history ==
Key
The yellow background indicates the #1 song on ARIA's End of Year Singles Chart of 2012.

Date	Song	Artist(s)	Ref.
2 January	"Sexy and I Know It"	LMFAO	
9 January	"Sexy and I Know It"	LMFAO	
16 January	"Pumped Up Kicks"	Foster the People	
23 January	"Wild Ones"	Flo Rida featuring Sia	
30 January	"Wild Ones"	Flo Rida featuring Sia	
6 February	"Wild Ones"	Flo Rida featuring Sia	
13 February	"Wild Ones"	Flo Rida featuring Sia	
20 February	"Wild Ones"	Flo Rida featuring Sia	
27 February	"Wild Ones"	Flo Rida featuring Sia	
5 March	"Ass Back Home"	Gym Class Heroes featuring Neon Hitch	
12 March	"We Are Young"	Fun featuring Janelle Monáe	
19 March	"We Are Young"	Fun featuring Janelle Monáe	
26 March	"We Are Young"	Fun featuring Janelle Monáe	
2 April	"Call Me Maybe"	Carly Rae Jepsen	
9 April	"Call Me Maybe"	Carly Rae Jepsen	
16 April	"Call Me Maybe"	Carly Rae Jepsen	
23 April	"Call Me Maybe"	Carly Rae Jepsen	
30 April	"Call Me Maybe"	Carly Rae Jepsen	
7 May	"Whistle"	Flo Rida	
14 May	"Whistle"	Flo Rida	
21 May	"Whistle"	Flo Rida	
28 May	"Whistle"	Flo Rida	
4 June	"Whistle"	Flo Rida	
11 June	"Whistle"	Flo Rida	
18 June	"Whistle"	Flo Rida	
25 June	"Stay with Me Baby"	Karise Eden	
2 July	"Whistle"	Flo Rida	
9 July	"Shout It Out"	Reece Mastin	
16 July	"Blow Me (One Last Kiss)"	Pink	
23 July	"Some Nights"	Fun	
30 July	"Some Nights"	Fun	
6 August	"Boom Boom"	Justice Crew	
13 August	"Boom Boom"	Justice Crew	
20 August	"Battle Scars"	Guy Sebastian and Lupe Fiasco	
27 August	"Battle Scars"	Guy Sebastian and Lupe Fiasco	
3 September	"Battle Scars"	Guy Sebastian and Lupe Fiasco	
10 September	"Battle Scars"	Guy Sebastian and Lupe Fiasco	
17 September	"Battle Scars"	Guy Sebastian and Lupe Fiasco	
24 September	"Battle Scars"	Guy Sebastian and Lupe Fiasco	
1 October	"Gangnam Style"	Psy	
8 October	"Gangnam Style"	Psy	
15 October	"Gangnam Style"	Psy	
22 October	"Gangnam Style"	Psy	
29 October	"Gangnam Style"	Psy	
5 November	"Gangnam Style"	Psy	
12 November	"Don't You Worry Child"	Swedish House Mafia featuring John Martin	
19 November	"Don't You Worry Child"	Swedish House Mafia featuring John Martin	
26 November	"What You've Done to Me"	Samantha Jade	
3 December	"Thrift Shop"	Macklemore & Ryan Lewis featuring Wanz	
10 December	"Thrift Shop"	Macklemore & Ryan Lewis featuring Wanz	
17 December	"Thrift Shop"	Macklemore & Ryan Lewis featuring Wanz	
24 December	"Thrift Shop"	Macklemore & Ryan Lewis featuring Wanz	
31 December	"Thrift Shop"	Macklemore & Ryan Lewis featuring Wanz	

== Number-one artists ==
Position	Artist	Weeks at No. 1
1	Flo Rida	14
2	Sia (as featuring)	6
2	Guy Sebastian	6
2	Lupe Fiasco	6
2	Psy	6
3	Carly Rae Jepsen	5
3	Fun	5
3	Macklemore	5
3	Wanz (as featuring)	5
4	Janelle Monáe (as featuring)	3
5	LMFAO	2
5	Justice Crew	2
5	Swedish House Mafia	2
5	John Martin (as featuring)	2
6	Foster the People	1
6	Gym Class Heroes	1
6	Neon Hitch (as featuring)	1
6	Karise Eden	1
6	Reece Mastin	1
6	Pink	1
6	Samantha Jade	1

== See also ==
- 2012 in music
- List of number-one albums of 2012 (Australia)
- List of top 25 singles for 2012 in Australia
- List of top 10 singles for 2012 in Australia
