= List of number-one urban singles of 2012 (Australia) =

ARIA Charts number-one urban singles of 2012 < 2011 2013 >

Other Australian number-one charts of 2012
- albums
- singles
- dance singles
- club tracks
- digital tracks

Top Australian singles and albums of 2012
- Triple J Hottest 100
- top 25 singles
- top 25 albums

The ARIA Urban Chart is a chart that ranks the best-performing Urban tracks singles of Australia. It is published by Australian Recording Industry Association (ARIA), an organisation who collect music data for the weekly ARIA Charts. To be eligible to appear on the chart, the recording must be a single, and be "predominantly of a Urban nature."

== Chart history ==
Issue date	Song	Artist(s)	Reference
2 January	"Hangover"	Taio Cruz featuring Flo Rida	
9 January	"Young, Wild & Free"	Snoop Dogg & Wiz Khalifa featuring Bruno Mars	
16 January	"Wild Ones"	Flo Rida featuring Sia	
23 January	"Wild Ones"	Flo Rida featuring Sia	
30 January	"Wild Ones"	Flo Rida featuring Sia	
6 February	"Wild Ones"	Flo Rida featuring Sia	
13 February	"Wild Ones"	Flo Rida featuring Sia	
20 February	"Wild Ones"	Flo Rida featuring Sia	
27 February	"Wild Ones"	Flo Rida featuring Sia	
5 March	"Wild Ones"	Flo Rida featuring Sia	
12 March	"Wild Ones"	Flo Rida featuring Sia	
19 March	"Starships"	Nicki Minaj	
26 March	"Starships"	Nicki Minaj	
2 April	"Starships"	Nicki Minaj	
9 April	"Starships"	Nicki Minaj	
16 April	"Starships"	Nicki Minaj	
23 April	"Starships"	Nicki Minaj	
30 April	"Starships"	Nicki Minaj	
7 May	"Whistle"	Flo Rida	
14 May	"Whistle"	Flo Rida	
21 May	"Whistle"	Flo Rida	
28 May	"Whistle"	Flo Rida	
4 June	"Whistle"	Flo Rida	
18 June	"Whistle"	Flo Rida	
25 June	"Whistle"	Flo Rida	
2 July	"Whistle"	Flo Rida	
9 July	"Whistle"	Flo Rida	
16 July	"Whistle"	Flo Rida	
23 May	"Don't Wake Me Up"	Chris Brown	
30 May	"Both Of Us"	B.o.B featuring Taylor Swift	
6 August	"Both Of Us"	B.o.B featuring Taylor Swift	
13 August	"Both Of Us"	B.o.B featuring Taylor Swift	
20 August	"Both Of Us"	B.o.B featuring Taylor Swift	
27 August	"Turn Up the Love"	Far East Movement featuring Cover Drive	
3 September	"Turn Up the Love"	Far East Movement featuring Cover Drive	
10 September	"I Cry"	Flo Rida	
17 September	"I Cry"	Flo Rida	
24 September	"I Cry"	Flo Rida	
1 October	"I Cry"	Flo Rida	
8 October	"I Cry"	Flo Rida	
15 October	"Diamonds"	Rihanna	
22 October	"Diamonds"	Rihanna	
29 October	"Diamonds"	Rihanna	
5 November	"Diamonds"	Rihanna	
12 November	"Diamonds"	Rihanna	
19 November	"Thrift Shop"	Macklemore & Ryan Lewis & Wanz	
26 November	"Thrift Shop"	Macklemore & Ryan Lewis & Wanz	
3 December	"Thrift Shop"	Macklemore & Ryan Lewis & Wanz	
10 December	"Thrift Shop"	Macklemore & Ryan Lewis & Wanz	
17 December	"Thrift Shop"	Macklemore & Ryan Lewis & Wanz	
24 December	"Thrift Shop"	Macklemore & Ryan Lewis & Wanz	
31 December	"Thrift Shop"	Macklemore & Ryan Lewis & Wanz	

== Number-one artists ==
Position	Artist	Weeks at No. 1
1	Flo Rida	25
2	Sia	9
3	Nicki Minaj	7
3	Macklemore & Ryan Lewis	7
3	Wanz	7
4	Rihanna	5
5	B.o.B	4
6	Far East Movement	2
6	Cover Drive	2
7	Bruno Mars	1
7	Chris Brown	1
7	Snoop Dogg	1
7	Taio Cruz	1
7	Wiz Khalifa	1

== See also ==
- 2012 in music
- List of number-one singles of 2012 (Australia)
