= List of number-one club tracks of 2012 (Australia) =

ARIA Charts number-one club tracks of 2012 < 2011 2013 >

Other Australian number-one charts of 2012
- albums
- singles
- urban singles
- dance singles
- digital tracks

Top Australian singles and albums of 2012
- Triple J Hottest 100
- top 25 singles
- top 25 albums

This is the list of number-one tracks on the ARIA Club Chart in 2012, and is compiled by the Australian Recording Industry Association (ARIA) from weekly DJ reports.

== 2012 ==
Date		Song	Artist(s)	Reference
January	16	"Paradise (Fedde Le Grand mix)"	Coldplay	
January	23	"Levels"	Avicii	
January	30	"Everybody Get Up"	Jam Xpress and Seany B	
February	6	"Everybody Get Up"	Jam Xpress and Seany B	
February	13	"Everybody Get Up"	Jam Xpress and Seany B	
February	20	"Everybody Get Up"	Jam Xpress and Seany B	
February	27	"In My Mind"	Ivan Gough and Feenixpawl featuring Georgi Kay	
March	5	"In My Mind"	Ivan Gough and Feenixpawl featuring Georgi Kay	
March	12	"In My Mind"	Ivan Gough and Feenixpawl featuring Georgi Kay	
March	19	"In My Mind"	Ivan Gough and Feenixpawl featuring Georgi Kay	
March	26	"In My Mind"	Ivan Gough and Feenixpawl featuring Georgi Kay	
April	2	"In My Mind"	Ivan Gough and Feenixpawl featuring Georgi Kay	
April	9	"In My Mind"	Ivan Gough and Feenixpawl featuring Georgi Kay	
April	16	"In My Mind"	Ivan Gough and Feenixpawl featuring Georgi Kay	
April	23	"In My Mind"	Ivan Gough and Feenixpawl featuring Georgi Kay	
April	30	"In My Mind"	Ivan Gough and Feenixpawl featuring Georgi Kay	
May	7	"In My Mind"	Ivan Gough and Feenixpawl featuring Georgi Kay	
May	14	"The Night Out"	Martin Solveig	
May	21	"The Night Out"	Martin Solveig	
May	28	"The Night Out"	Martin Solveig	
June	4	"The Night Out"	Martin Solveig	
June	11	"The Night Out"	Martin Solveig	
June	18	"The Night Out"	Martin Solveig	
June	25	"Sassafras"	Timmy Trumpet and Chardy	
July	2	"Sassafras"	Timmy Trumpet and Chardy	
July	9	"Sassafras"	Timmy Trumpet and Chardy	
July	16	"Sassafras"	Timmy Trumpet and Chardy	
July	23	"Sassafras"	Timmy Trumpet and Chardy	
July	30	"Sassafras"	Timmy Trumpet and Chardy	
August	6	"Get Stoopid"	Bombs Away and Seany B	
August	13	"Get Stoopid"	Bombs Away and Seany B	
August	20	"Girl From The Sky"	Helena featuring Mr. Wilson	
August	27	"Girl From The Sky"	Helena featuring Mr. Wilson	
September	3	"Go"	Tonite Only	
September	10	"Don't You Worry Child"	Swedish House Mafia	
September	17	"Don't You Worry Child"	Swedish House Mafia	
September	24	"Don't You Worry Child"	Swedish House Mafia	
October	1	"Don't You Worry Child"	Swedish House Mafia	
October	8	"Don't You Worry Child"	Swedish House Mafia	
October	15	"Don't You Worry Child"	Swedish House Mafia	
October	22	"Don't You Worry Child"	Swedish House Mafia	
October	29	"Don't You Worry Child"	Swedish House Mafia	
November	5	"Don't You Worry Child"	Swedish House Mafia	
November	12	"Don't You Worry Child"	Swedish House Mafia	
November	19	"Don't You Worry Child"	Swedish House Mafia	
November	26	"Don't You Worry Child"	Swedish House Mafia	
December	3	"Don't You Worry Child"	Swedish House Mafia	
December	10	"Don't You Worry Child"	Swedish House Mafia	
December	17	"The Way You Are"	Peking Duk	
December	24	"The Way You Are"	Peking Duk	

== Number-one artists ==
Position	Artist	Weeks at No. 1
1	Swedish House Mafia	14
2	Ivan Gough	11
3	Martin Solveig	6
3	Timmy Trumpet	6
4	Jam Xpress	4
5	Bombs Away	2
5	Helena	2
5	Peking Duk	2
6	Coldplay	1
6	Avicii	1
6	Tonite Only	1

== See also ==
- ARIA Charts
- List of number-one singles of 2012 (Australia)
- List of number-one albums of 2012 (Australia)
- 2012 in music
