= My Journey (Karise Eden album) =

Studio album by Karise Eden
- Released: 26 June 2012
- Recorded: 2012
- Genre: Pop rock; pop; R&B; soul
- Length: 40:35
- Label: Universal

Karise Eden chronology
| My Journey (2012) | Things I've Done (2014) |

Singles from My Journey
- 1. "You Won't Let Me" Released: 19 June 2012

My Journey (stylized as My Journey.) is the debut studio album by Australian singer and songwriter Karise Eden, who won the first season of The Voice Australia. It was released on 26 June 2012 by Universal Music Australia. The album debuted at number one on the ARIA Albums Chart and was certified double platinum by the Australian Recording Industry Association for shipments of more than 140,000 copies.

== Singles ==
- "You Won't Let Me" was released as the first and only single from the album on 19 June 2012. The song reached number five on the ARIA Singles Chart and was certified gold by the Australian Recording Industry Association for selling more than 35,000 copies.

== Track listing ==
| No. | Title | Writer(s) | Original artist | Length |
|---|---|---|---|---|
| 1. | "It's a Man's World" (The Voice performance) | James Brown; Betty Newsome | James Brown | 2:41 |
| 2. | "Back to Black" (The Voice performance) | Amy Winehouse; Mark Ronson | Amy Winehouse | 2:31 |
| 3. | "Nothing's Real but Love" (The Voice performance) | Rebecca Ferguson; Francis White | Rebecca Ferguson | 2:59 |
| 4. | "Landslide" (The Voice performance) | Stevie Nicks | Fleetwood Mac | 3:21 |
| 5. | "Hallelujah" (The Voice performance) | Leonard Cohen | Leonard Cohen | 3:55 |
| 6. | "Stay with Me Baby" (The Voice performance) | Jerry Ragovoy; George Weiss | Janis Joplin | 3:23 |
| 7. | "I Was Your Girl" (The Voice performance) | Karise Eden | | 2:14 |
| 8. | "You Won't Let Me" | Rachael Yamagata; Mike Viola | Rachael Yamagata | 3:37 |
| 9. | "Hound Dog" | Jerry Leiber; Mike Stoller | Big Mama Thornton | 2:34 |
| 10. | "The Dock of the Bay" | Otis Redding; Steve Cropper | Otis Redding | 3:00 |
| 11. | "The Weight" | Robbie Robertson | The Band | 3:06 |
| 12. | "I'd Rather Go Blind" | Ellington Jordan; Billy Foster | Etta James | 3:24 |
| 13. | "Move Over" | Janis Joplin | Janis Joplin | 3:50 |

== Charts ==
=== Weekly charts ===
| Chart (2012) | Peak position |
|---|---|
| Australian Albums Chart | 1 |
| New Zealand Albums Chart | 3 |

=== Year-end charts ===
| Chart (2012) | Position |
|---|---|
| Australian Albums Chart | 6 |
| Australian Artist Albums Chart | 1 |

=== Decade-end charts ===
| Chart (2010–2019) | Position |
|---|---|
| Australian Albums (ARIA) | 67 |
| Australian Artist Albums (ARIA) | 11 |

== Certifications ==
| Region | Certification | Certified units/sales |
|---|---|---|
| Australia (ARIA) | 2× Platinum | 140,000^{^} |
| New Zealand (RMNZ) | Gold | 7,500^{^} |
^{^} Shipments figures based on certification alone.

== Release history ==
| Country | Date | Format | Label | Catalogue |
|---|---|---|---|---|
| Australia | 26 June 2012 | CD, digital download | Universal Music Australia | 3707239 |
| United States | 19 August 2014 | Digital download | Universal Music Australia | |
