= Karise Eden =

Australian singer and songwriter (born 1992)

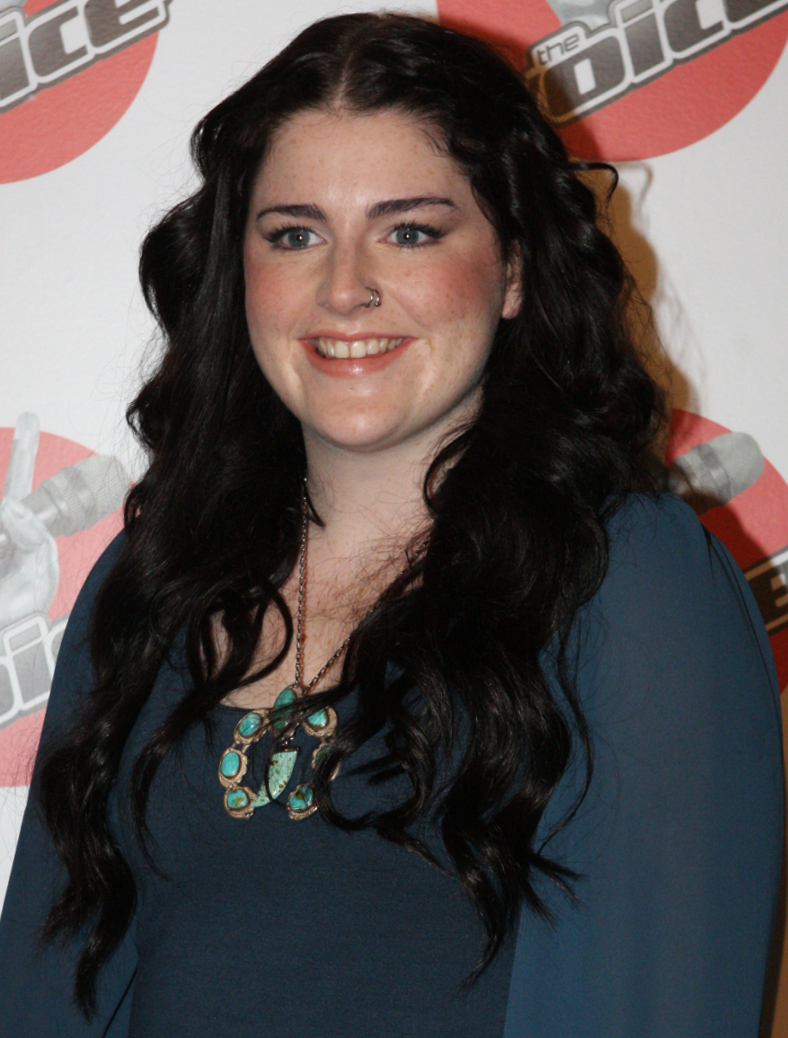
- Eden in June 2012

Background information
- Born: 11 July 1992 (age 34); Gosford, New South Wales, Australia
- Genres: Blues, pop, soul
- Occupations: Singer, songwriter
- Instruments: Vocals, banjo, double bass, guitar
- Years active: 2012–present
- Label: Universal
- Website: www.kariseeden.com.au

Karise Eden (born 11 July 1992) is an Australian singer and songwriter. In 2012, she became the winner of the first series of The Voice Australia. Eden subsequently signed with Universal Music Australia and released her debut single "You Won't Let Me". It was one of the four songs recorded by Eden that entered the ARIA Singles Chart top five during the week of 25 June 2012. She became the first artist to achieve this feat since The Beatles, who held the top six positions of the chart in 1964. Eden's debut studio album My Journey was released on 26 June 2012, which contained songs she performed on The Voice, as well as newly recorded covers. The album debuted at number one on the ARIA Albums Chart and was certified double platinum.

== Early life ==
Eden was born on 11 July 1992 in Gosford Hospital in Gosford, New South Wales. She was raised in Wyoming, New South Wales. Her mother is Michele and her sister is Siana. From a young age, Eden and her sister were part of a foster aunty and uncle program, which gave their single mother Michele respite. One weekend a month (and often more often), they would stay with 'aunty' Marilyn and 'uncle' Frank. Eden's childhood was deeply affected by her family dysfunctions and issues of self-esteem. As the years passed, she did not always get along well with her mother, and at the age of 11, she began harming herself. During this time, she was diagnosed with agoraphobia and, at the age of 12, Eden finished school. It was around this time that Eden saw a Janis Joplin documentary on television and realised that maybe the raspy tones in her own voice weren't that bad after all. "Hence began my obsession with everything Janis".

At around the age of 13, Eden was left in the care of Department of Community Services at Gosford by her mother, who was not coping. Eden spent her teenage years living in over 20 women's refuges as a state ward. During this time, she reconnected with Aunty Marilyn and Uncle Frank who were both musicians. She recalled that her uncle Frank taught her everything about music and how to play the guitar. "When he first started teaching me how to play, I was playing traditional folk and bluegrass – now I play the double bass and I'm learning the banjo".

== Career ==
=== 2012: The Voice Australia and My Journey ===
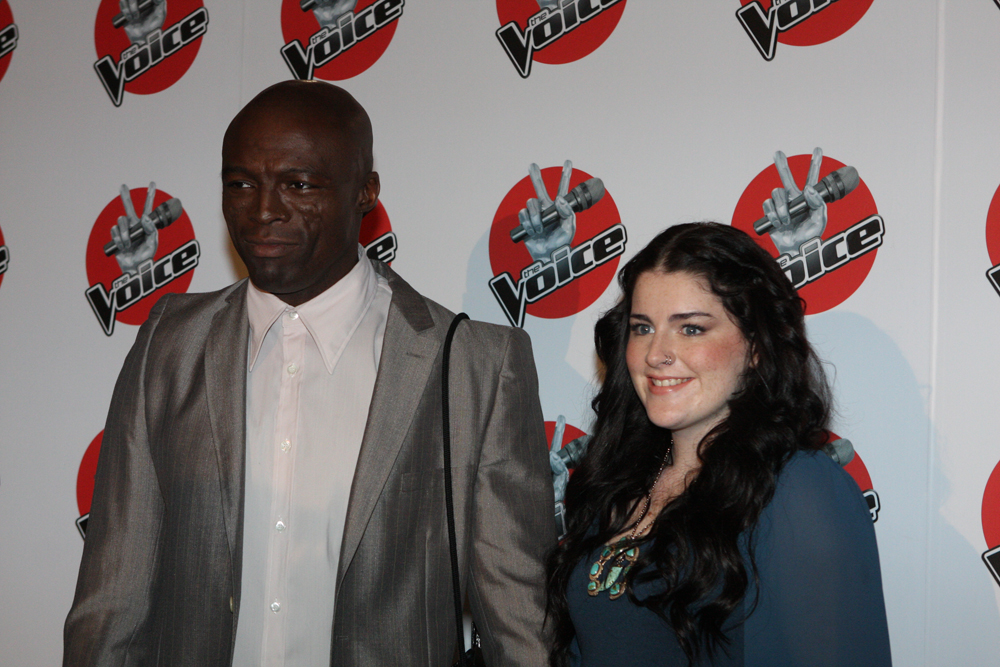
Eden with her coach and mentor Seal in June 2012.

Eden auditioned for the first series of the Australian reality television talent show The Voice. She appeared on the show's first episode on 15 April 2012, singing James Brown's "It's a Man's World". All four coaches turned around their chairs within the first twelve seconds: Keith Urban was the first coach who turned around his chair, followed by the other three coaches: Seal, Delta Goodrem and Joel Madden. All four coaches opted to take Eden as one of their finalists; she eventually chose Seal as her coach and mentor. Eden progressed through to the Battle Rounds, where she was paired against contestant Paula Parore, singing Amy Winehouse's "Back to Black". As a result, Seal chose Eden as the winner of the battle and she progressed through to the Live Shows. Throughout this round, the coaches and audiences were impressed with Eden's performances of Rebecca Ferguson's "Nothing's Real but Love", Fleetwood Mac's "Landslide" and Leonard Cohen's "Hallelujah".

During the first part of the grand final, on 17 June 2012, Eden sang an original song entitled "I Was Your Girl", which she co-wrote with a friend, and a cover of Lorraine Ellison's "Stay with Me Baby". Eden was announced the winner of the season during the second part of the grand final on 18 June 2012. After she was announced the winner, Eden performed her debut single "You Won't Let Me" for the first time. She was awarded a prize of $100,000, a Ford Focus car and a recording contract with Universal Music Australia.

==== Performances ====
Performed	Song	Original artist	Result
Blind Audition	"It's a Man's Man's Man's World"	James Brown	Joined Team Seal
Battle Rounds	"Back to Black" (against Paula Parore)	Amy Winehouse	Winner
Live Show Final, Part 1	"Nothing's Real but Love"	Rebecca Ferguson	Public vote
Live Show Final, Part 3	"Landslide"	Fleetwood Mac	Public vote
Live Show Final, Part 3	"Kiss From a Rose" (as part of Team Seal)	Seal	Public vote
Live Show Final, Part 5	"Hallelujah"	Leonard Cohen	Seal's choice
The Live Finale, Part 1	"Stay with Me"	Lorraine Ellison	Winner
The Live Finale, Part 1	"You Won’t Let Me"	Rachael Yamagata	Winner
The Live Finale, Part 2	"Many Rivers to Cross" (with Seal)	Jimmy Cliff	Winner
The Live Finale, Part 2	"The Chain"	Fleetwood Mac	Winner

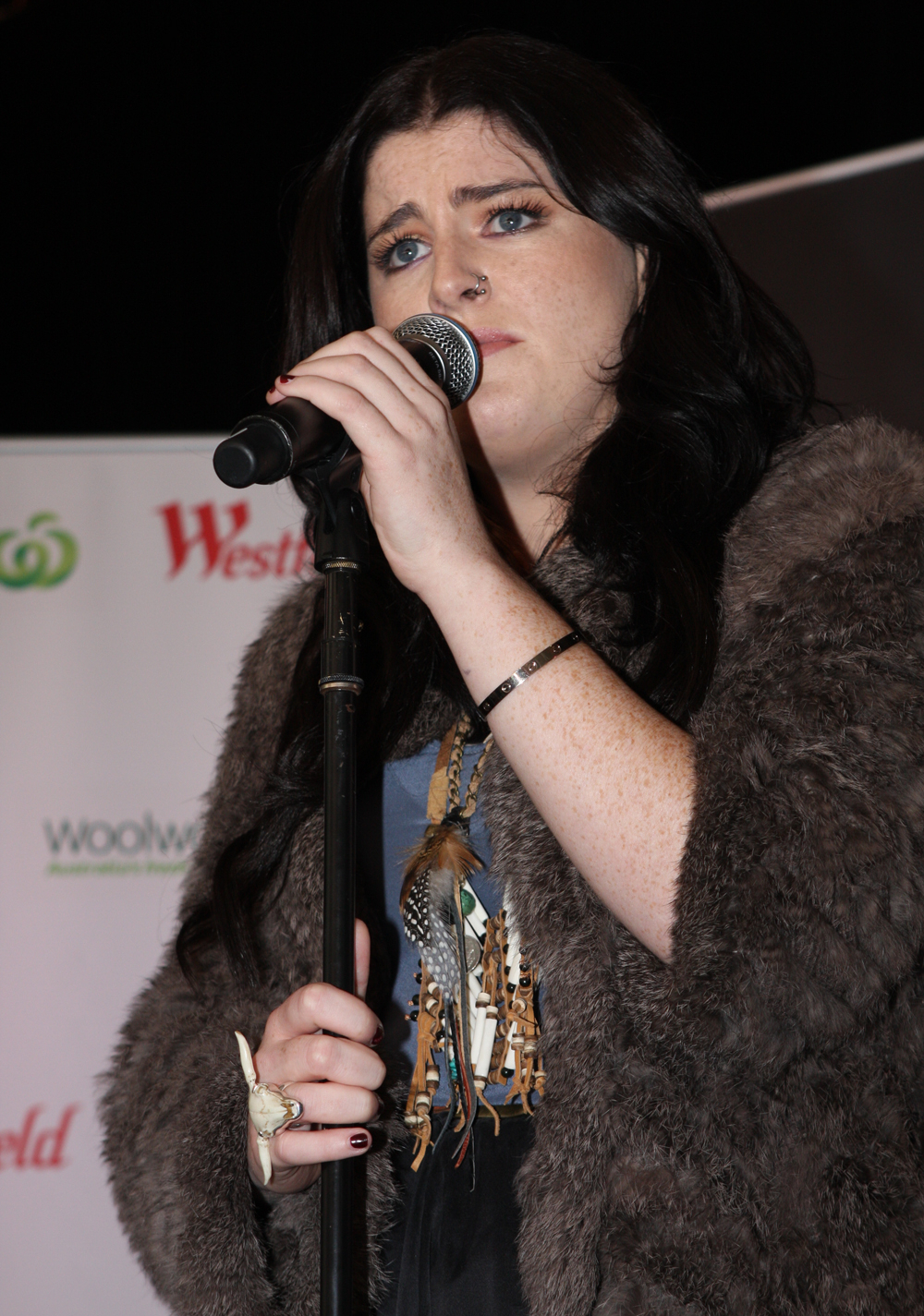
Eden performing live at Westfield Sydney, Australia on 29 June 2012.

"You Won't Let Me" was released digitally on 19 June 2012 and physically on 21 June 2012. For the week of 25 June 2012, Eden's songs "You Won't Let Me", "Stay with Me Baby", "Hallelujah" and "I Was Your Girl" took up four positions of the ARIA Singles Chart top five. She became the first artist to achieve this feat since the Beatles, who held the top six positions of the chart in 1964. Eden had a total of eight songs in the ARIA top 50 for that week. Six of these songs left the ARIA top 50 the following week, including "Stay with Me Baby" which dropped to number 54, the biggest drop from number one in Australian chart history. "I Was Your Girl" left the ARIA top 100, the equal biggest fall for a number three song in Australian chart history. "You Won't Let Me", "I Was Your Girl", "Nothing's Real but Love" and "Stay with Me Baby" each received gold certifications by the Australian Recording Industry Association (ARIA), for sales of 35,000 copies. "Hallelujah" was certified platinum for sales of 70,000 copies.

Eden's debut studio album My Journey was released on 26 June 2012. The album features recorded versions of the covers Eden performed on The Voice, the original song "I Was Your Girl", as well as newly recorded covers of "The Weight", "Hound Dog", "Move Over", "I'd Rather Go Blind" and "The Dock of the Bay". The album debuted at number one on the ARIA Albums Chart, where it remained for six consecutive weeks. It was certified double platinum by the ARIA, denoting sales of 140,000 copies. The album also debuted at number three on the New Zealand Albums Chart and was certified gold by the Recording Industry Association of New Zealand (RIANZ), denoting sales of 7,500 copies. Eden promoted the album with instore appearances at Westfield shopping centres across Australia. In October 2012, she embarked on the Heavenly Sounds national tour of churches and cathedral venues.

=== 2013–2017: Things I've Done ===
In March 2013, Eden was part of the Bluesfest along with many other local and international acts in Byron Bay, New South Wales. Eden's second single "Threads of Silence", co-written with Sacha Skarbek in London, was released digitally on 3 June 2013, the same day she performed it live on The Voice. Upon its release, the song debuted and peaked at number 19 on the ARIA Singles Chart. "Dynamite" was released as the lead single from Eden's second studio album, Things I've Done, on 12 September 2014, and peaked at number 65. The album was released on 17 October 2014, and debuted at number five on the ARIA Albums Chart. The album's second single "Loneliness" was released on 3 April 2015, but failed to chart. On 2 June 2015, Eden released a cover version of The Shirelles song "Will You Still Love Me Tomorrow", which was used in a promotional sync campaign for the Nine Network's drama series Love Child.

=== 2018–2021: Born to Fight ===
In October 2018, Eden announced the release of her third studio album titled Born to Fight. Eden realized she wanted to make music that showed her fiery side, her passion for blues, rock'n roll and even power ballads, saying "I've always been singing sad soul songs and I thought, just for once, there's another side of my personality that's never been shown on camera, my off-screen sass and who I am as a person, and that's a lot of what poured into this album." The album's lead single, "Temporary Lovers," was released on 19 October 2018. The full album was released on 23 November 2018.

=== 2022: Into the Black ===
In January 2022, Eden announced the forthcoming release of her fourth studio album, titled, Into the Black.

== Artistry ==
Aside from singing, Eden also plays the banjo, double bass and guitar. She cites Janis Joplin, Axl Rose, Bon Jovi and Amy Winehouse as her musical inspirations.

== Personal life ==
On 8 September 2014, Eden announced that she was expecting her first child. She gave birth to a son named Blayden on 24 December 2014. In January 2018, Eden was hospitalised after being involved in a motor cycle accident.

== Discography ==
=== Studio albums ===
Title	Album details	Peak chart positions		Certifications
Title	Album details	AUS	NZ	Certifications
My Journey	Released: 26 June 2012; Formats: CD, digital download; Label: Universal Music Australia (3707239)	1	3	ARIA: 2× Platinum; RMNZ: Gold
Things I've Done	Released: 17 October 2014; Formats: CD, digital download; Label: Universal Music Australia (4703626)	5	—	
Born to Fight	Released: 23 November 2018; Formats: CD, digital download, streaming; Label: Island Records Australia (7708210)	37	—	
Into the Black	Released: 13 May 2022; Formats: digital download, streaming; Label: Karise Eden	—	—	
"—" denotes a recording that did not chart in that country.

=== Singles ===
Title	Year	Peak chart positions	Certifications	Album
Title	Year	AUS	Certifications	Album
"You Won't Let Me"	2012	5	ARIA: Gold	My Journey
"Threads of Silence"	2013	19		Non-album single
"Dynamite"	2014	65		Things I've Done
"Loneliness"	2015	—		Things I've Done
"Will You Still Love Me Tomorrow"	2015	93		Non-album single
"Temporary Lovers"	2018	—		Born to Fight
"Gimme Your Love"	2018	—		Born to Fight
"Born to Fight"	2018	—		Born to Fight
"Gone"	2022	—		Into the Black
"Wild Hearts"	2024	—		Non-album single
"—" denotes a recording that did not chart.

=== Promotional singles ===
Title	Year	Peak chart positions		Certifications	Album
Title	Year	AUS	NZ	Certifications	Album
"It's a Man's World"	2012	21	—	ARIA: Gold	My Journey
"Back to Black"	2012	36	—		My Journey
"Nothing's Real but Love"	2012	9	—	ARIA: Gold	My Journey
"Landslide"	2012	14	—	ARIA: Gold	My Journey
"Hallelujah"	2012	2	35	ARIA: Platinum	My Journey
"I Was Your Girl"	2012	3	36	ARIA: Gold	My Journey
"Stay with Me Baby"	2012	1	25	ARIA: Gold	My Journey
"—" denotes a recording that did not chart in that country.

=== Album appearances ===
Title	Year	Album
"Red-Suited Super Man" (with Rod Stewart)	2012	Merry Christmas, Baby

== Awards and nominations ==
Year	Type	Award	Result
2012	ARIA No. 1 Chart Awards	No. 1 Album (My Journey)	Won
2012	ARIA No. 1 Chart Awards	No. 1 Single ("Stay with Me Baby")	Won

Awards
Preceded by N/A	The Voice winner 2012	Succeeded by Harrison Craig
