= 2012 in music =

This topic covers notable events and articles related to 2012 in music. This year was the peak of music downloads sales in the United States, with sales declining year on year since then.

== Specific locations ==
- 2012 in African music
- 2012 in American music
- 2012 in Asian music
- 2012 in Australian music
- 2012 in British music
- 2012 in Canadian music
- 2012 in Chinese music
- 2012 in European music (Continental Europe)
- 2012 in French music
- 2012 in German music
- 2012 in Irish music
- 2012 in Japanese music
- 2012 in Norwegian music
- 2012 in Philippine music
- 2012 in Scandinavian music
- 2012 in South Korean music
- 2012 in Swedish music
- 2012 in Taiwanese music

== Specific genres ==
- 2012 in alternative music
- 2012 in classical music
- 2012 in country music
- 2012 in heavy metal music
- 2012 in hip-hop
- 2012 in jazz
- 2012 in Latin music
- 2012 in opera
- 2012 in progressive rock
- 2012 in rock music

== Classical music ==
- Hans Abrahamsen – String Quartet No. 4
- John Adams – Absolute Jest, for string quartet and orchestra
- Harrison Birtwistle – The Moth Requiem, for twelve female voices, three harps and alto flute
- Elliott Carter
  - Dialogues II, for piano and chamber orchestra
  - Epigrams, for violin, cello, and piano
  - Instances, for chamber orchestra
- Unsuk Chin – cosmigimmicks. A musical pantomime for seven instrumentalists
- Peter Maxwell Davies – Symphony No. 9
- Clemens Gadenstätter
  - Bersten/Platzen (Paramyth 4), for cello and piano
  - Haüten/Paramyth 1, for string quartet
  - Sad Songs, for quartet with saxophone, electric guitar, percussion, piano and integrated electronics
- Magnus Lindberg – Acequia Madre, for clarinet and piano
- Bruno Mantovani – Concerto pour deux pianos, for two pianos and orchestra
- Tristan Murail
  - The Bronze Age, for flute, clarinet, trombone, violin, cello and piano
  - Le Désenchantement du Monde, piano concerto
- Matthias Pintscher
  - Bereshit, for large ensemble
  - Uriel, for cello and piano
- Alberto Posadas - Sombras, for soprano, clarinet and string quartet
- Eva Reiter – Irrlicht, for ensemble and electronics
- Kaija Saariaho
  - Circle Map, for orchestra and electronics
  - Duft, for clarinet
  - Sombre, for voice, bass flute, percussion, harp, and double bass
- Erkki-Sven Tüür – String Quartet No. 2 Lost Prayers
- Pēteris Vasks – Cello concerto No. 2 Klātbūtne ('Presence')

== Opera ==
- George Benjamin – Written on Skin
- Jörg Widmann – Babylon

== Singles ==
- Who Are You (Emine Sari song), released: 6 June 2012

== Births ==
- January 7 - Blue Ivy Carter, first born daughter of Beyoncé and Jay-Z, dancer, singer and activist (Member of greater Knowles family including Grand parents: Mathew Knowles, Tina Knowles, First cousin once removed: Angela Beyincé and Aunt:Solange Knowles)

== Deaths ==
January

- 3 – Daniel Peil (69), American rock singer (The Corporation)
- 4 – Totti Bergh (76), Norwegian jazz saxophonist
  - Ruthilde Boesch (94), Austrian soprano
  - John Levy (99), American jazz upright-bassist
- 26 – Clare Fischer (83), American jazz keyboardist, composer, arranger and bandleader

February

- 11 – Whitney Houston (48), American pop/R&B singer
- 22 – Eivin One Pedersen (55), Norwegian jazz accordionist and pianist
- 25 – Red Holloway (84), American jazz tenor saxophonist
- 29 - Davy Jones (66), English singer (The Monkees)

March

- 1 – Lucio Dalla (68), Italian jazz singer, clarinetist and actor
- 3 – Frank Marocco (81), American jazz piano-accordionist, arranger and composer
- 6 – Robert B. Sherman, 86, American songwriter, brother of Richard M. Sherman (Sherman Brothers)
- 15 – Edvard Hagerup Bull (89), Norwegian composer.

April

- 19 – Greg Ham (58), Australian musician Men at Work

May

- 4 – Adam Yauch (47), American rapper (Beastie Boys)
- 10 – Bernardo Sassetti (41), Portuguese jazz pianist and composer
- 13 – Trond Bråthen alias "Trondr Nefas" (35), Norwegian singer and guitarist of black metal band Urgehal
- 14 – Belita Woods (63), American R&B singer (Brainstorm)
- 17
  - Warda Al-Jazairia (72), French-Algerian singer, in Egypt
  - Donna Summer (63). American singer
- 20 – Robin Gibb (62), British singer (Bee Gees)
- 30 – Pete Cosey (68), American jazz guitarist

June

- 8 – Wilf Doyle (87), Canadian accordionist
- 17 – Brian Hibbard (65), (The Flying Pickets)
- 26 – Harry W. Kvebæk (87), Norwegian classical trumpeter and academic

July

- 7 – Alf Pearson (102), British singer and variety performer (Bob and Alf Pearson)
- 27 – Darryl Cotton (62), Australian pop-rock singer-songwriter (Zoot, Cotton, Lloyd & Christian)
- 31 - Tony Sly (41), Singer, guitarist for punk rock band No Use For a Name

August

- 11 – Von Freeman (88), American jazz saxophonist
- 18 – Scott McKenzie (73), American singer

September

- 25 – Andy Williams (84), American singer
- 26 – Marty Fortson (67), American rock and roll singer (The Rivieras)
- 29 – Johnny Sanders (66), American rock guitarist (The Gants)

October

- 8 – John Tchicai (76), Danish jazz saxophonist and composer
- 26 – Louis Nunley (81), American pop singer (The Anita Kerr Quartet)

November

- 1 – Mitch Lucker (28), American singer (Suicide Silence)
- 3
  - Anne-Lise Berntsen (69), Norwegian soprano singer
  - Odd Børretzen (85), Norwegian author and folk singer (pneumonia)
- 15 – Frode Thingnæs (72), Norwegian jazz trombonist and bandleader (complications from heart attack)
- 20 – Sherry Zannoth (66), American operatic soprano

December

- 5 – Dave Brubeck (91), American jazz pianist and composer
- 9 – Jenni Rivera (43), Mexican-American singer.
- 24 – Capital STEEZ (19), American hip-hop artist

== See also ==
- List of Single Top 100 number-one singles of 2012
- Timeline of musical events
- Women in music
- 2012 in television
