= List of awards and nominations received by Guy Sebastian =

- Guy Sebastian's awards and nominations
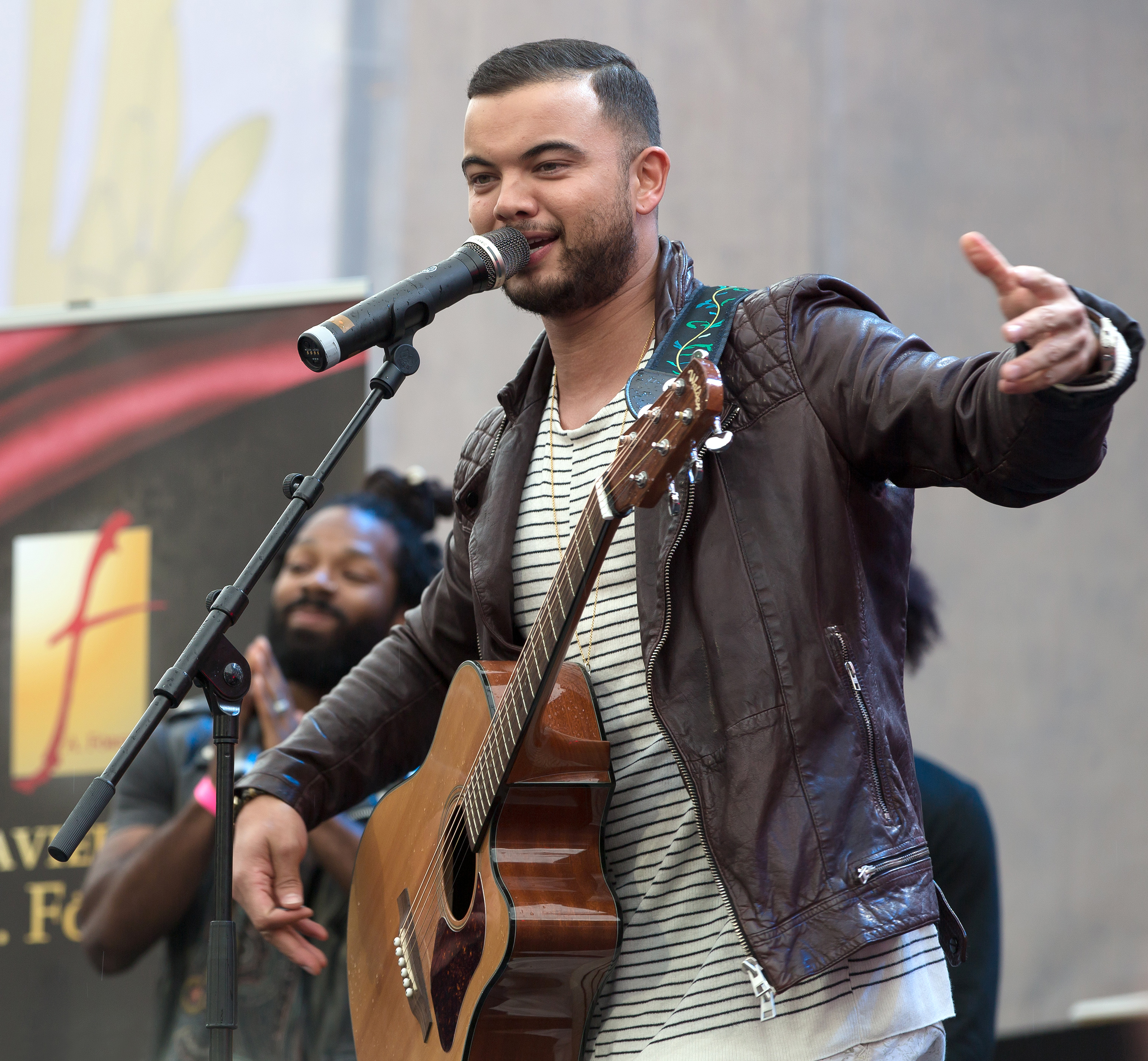
- Sebastian at the ESC2015 Eurovision Village, Vienna, 20 May 2015
Award	Nominations	Wins
ARIA Music Awards	35	7
ARIA No. 1 Chart Awards	6	6
ARIA End of Year and End of Decade Charts	4	4
APRA Awards	25	4
Australian Commercial Radio Awards	2	1
Australian Club Entertainment Awards	5	3
Australian and New Zealand Urban Music Awards	4	3
Channel [V] Oz Artist of the Year Awards	4	1
Nickelodeon Kids' Choice Awards	14	6
Australian MTV Awards	2	2
Australian GQ Awards	2	1
Advertiser Confidential/Scene Awards	3	2
Dolly Teen Choice Awards	3	2
International Songwriting Competition	2	1
POPrepublic.tv IT List Awards	20	4
World Music Awards	5	-
Other Awards	12	6
- Totals
Nominations	146
Awards won	53
- Footnotes
- The "Won" and "Nominated" cells of this infobox also include No. 1 rankings on lists, works which have been shortlisted and pending results.

Guy Sebastian is an Australian pop, R&B and soul singer-songwriter who was the first winner of the Australian Idol series in 2003. Since then he has released ten top ten albums, with seven reaching the top five, including three which peaked at number one. He has also released 23 top 20 singles, with 14 reaching the top ten of the ARIA Singles Chart including six number ones. This is a list of the nominations, awards, and other recognition Sebastian has received during his career.

== Awards and nominations ==
=== ARIA Music Awards ===
The Australian Recording Industry Association Music Awards, commonly known as ARIA Music Awards are held to recognise excellence and innovation and achievement across all genres of Australian music. Award nominees and winners, excluding for sales and public voted categories, are selected by the ARIA Academy comprising "judges from all sectors of the music industry - retail, radio and tv, journalists and critics, television presenters, concert promoters, agents, ARIA member record companies and past ARIA winners". The inaugural ARIA Awards took place in 1987.

Year	Category	Nominated work	Result	Ref.
2004	Highest Selling Single	"Angels Brought Me Here"	Won	
2004	Highest Selling Album	Just as I Am	Nominated	
2005	Highest Selling Album	Beautiful Life	Nominated	
2008	Highest Selling Album	The Memphis Album	Nominated	
2010	Best Male Artist	Like It Like That	Nominated	
2010	Best Pop Release	Like It Like That	Nominated	
2010	Most Popular Australian Album	Like It Like That	Nominated	
2010	Most Popular Australian Single	"Like It Like That"	Nominated	
2010	Most Popular Australian Single	"Art of Love" (featuring Jordin Sparks)	Shortlisted	
2010	Most Popular Australian Artist	Like It Like That	Nominated	
2011	Single of the Year	"Who's That Girl?" (featuring Eve)	Nominated	
2011	Best Pop Release	"Who's That Girl?" (featuring Eve)	Nominated	
2011	Highest Selling Single	"Who's That Girl?" (featuring Eve)	Won	
2011	Most Popular Australian Artist	"Who's That Girl?" (featuring Eve)	Nominated	
2012	Best Pop Release	"Battle Scars" (featuring Lupe Fiasco)	Nominated	
2012	Best Male Artist	"Battle Scars" (featuring Lupe Fiasco)	Nominated	
2012	Song of the Year	"Don't Worry Be Happy"	Nominated	
2013	Album of the Year	Armageddon	Nominated	
2013	Best Male Artist	Armageddon	Nominated	
2013	Best Pop Release	Armageddon	Won	
2013	Song of the Year	"Get Along"	Nominated	
2013	Best Australian Live Act	Get Along Tour	Won	
2014	Best Male Artist	"Come Home With Me"	Nominated	
2014	Song of the Year	"Like a Drum"	Nominated	
2015	Best Male Artist	"Tonight Again"	Nominated	
2016	Best Male Artist	"Black & Blue"	Nominated	
2016	Best Video	"Black & Blue"	Nominated	
2017	Song of the Year	"Set in Stone"	Nominated	
2019	Best Male Artist	"Choir"	Nominated	
2019	Best Pop Release	"Choir"	Nominated	
2019	Song of the Year	"Choir"	Won	
2019	Best Video	"Choir"	Won	
2020	Best Male Artist	"Standing with You"	Nominated	
2020	Best Video	"Standing with You"	Won	
2021	M-Phazes for T.R.U.T.H.	Producer of the Year	Nominated	

=== ARIA No. 1 Chart Awards ===
The Australian Recording Industry Association (ARIA) held the No. 1 Chart Awards to recognise Australian artists who achieved number one on the ARIA singles or album charts. The Awards were last held in 2012.

Year	Category	Nominated work	Result^{[a]}	Ref.
2004	No. 1 Chart Award (Album)	Just as I Am	Won	
2004	No. 1 Chart Award (Single)	"Angels Brought Me Here"	Won	
2004	No. 1 Chart Award (Single)	"All I Need Is You"	Won	
2005	No. 1 Chart Award (Single)	"Out with My Baby"	Won	
2010	No. 1 Chart Award (Single)	"Like It Like That"	Won	
2012	No. 1 Chart Award (Single)	"Who's That Girl"	Won	

Note a Since 2012 Sebastian has achieved number one's with "Battle Scars" featuring Lupe Fiasco, and for the albums Armageddon and T.R.U.T.H.. Sebastian is the only Australian male artist in Australian music history to achieve six number one singles, and is third overall for all Australian acts. Only Kylie Minogue and Delta Goodrem have more.

=== ARIA End of Year and End of Decade Charts ===
ARIA recognises sales achievements with the listing of the highest selling releases of each year on their website in the End of Year Charts. In 2010 they also listed the highest selling releases of the decade 2000 - 2009 in the End of Decade Charts. Sebastian's debut single "Angels Brought Me Here" was named the highest selling single of the decade and he was presented with an award for this at the 2010 ARIA No. 1 Awards.

Year	Category	Nominated work	Rank	Ref.
2003	Top 100 Singles	"Angels Brought Me Here"	1	
2009	Top 50 Australian Artist Singles	"Like It Like That"	1	
2010	End of Decade Top 100 Singles	"Angels Brought Me Here"	1	
2012	Top 50 Australian Artist Singles	"Battle Scars" (featuring Lupe Fiasco)	1	

=== APRA Awards ===
The APRA Awards are run in Australia and New Zealand by the Australasian Performing Right Association to recognise songwriting skills, sales and airplay performance by its members. Nominations and winners in each category are chosen either by the voting members of APRA, members of the APRA Board or APRA based statistical analysis. The Song of the Year category is fully peer judged with the shortlist, final five nominees and winner voted for by the songwriting members of APRA.

Year	Category	Nominated work	Result	Ref.
2005	Most Performed Australian Work	"All I Need Is You"	Nominated	
2006	Most Performed Urban Work	"Kryptonite"	Nominated	
2006	Most Performed Urban Work	"Oh Oh"	Won	
2010	Song of the Year	"Art of Love"	Shortlisted	
2011	Song of the Year	"All to Myself"	Shortlisted	
2011	Song of the Year	"Who's That Girl"	Shortlisted	
2011	Urban Work of the Year	"Who's That Girl"	Won	
2012	Song of the Year	"Don't Worry Be Happy"	Shortlisted	
2013	Song of the Year	"Get Along"	Final 5	
2013	Pop Work of the Year	"Don't Worry Be Happy"	Nominated	
2013	Most Played Australian Work	"Don't Worry Be Happy"	Nominated	
2015	Pop Work of the Year	"Like a Drum"	Nominated	
2015	Most Played Australian Work	"Like a Drum"	Nominated	
2017	Song of the Year	"Set in Stone"	Shortlisted	
2017	Pop Work of the Year	"Black & Blue"	Nominated	
2018	Pop Work of the Year	"Set in Stone"	Nominated	
2020	Song of the Year	"Choir"	Nominated	
2020	Most Performed Australian Work of the Year	"Choir"	Nominated	
2020	Most Performed Pop Work of the Year	"Choir"	Nominated	
2021	Song of the Year	"Standing with You"	Nominated	
2021	"Let Me Drink"	Most Performed Pop Work of the Year	Nominated	
2022	"Love On Display"	Most Performed Australian Work of the Year	Nominated	
2022	"Love On Display"	Most Performed Pop Work of the Year	Nominated	
2026	"Maybe" (Guy Sebastian / Robby De Sá / Ned Houston)	Most Performed Australian Work	Won	
2026	"Maybe" (Guy Sebastian / Robby De Sá / Ned Houston)	Most Performed Pop Work	Won	

=== International Songwriting Competition ===
The International Songwriting Competition (ISC) is an annual song contest for both aspiring and established songwriters. The judging panel is made up of musicians, songwriters and industry experts, and songs are judged on creativity, originality, lyrics, melody, arrangement and overall likeability.

Year	Category	Nominated work	Result	Ref.
2013	R&B/Hip-Hop	"Battle Scars"	Won	
2013	Pop/Top 40	"Get Along"	Nominated	

=== Australian Commercial Radio Awards ===
The Australian Commercial Radio Awards are held annually. Winners are decided by a judging panel from nominations by radio stations and individuals.

Year	Category	Nominated work	Result	Ref.
2004	Best New Australian Artist	Himself	Nominated	
2010	Best Music Special	The Hamish & Andy Show - Guy Sebastian vs every other artist on our playlist	Won	

=== Australian Club Entertainment Awards ===
The Australian Club Entertainment Awards are held annually to honour Australian music and variety acts. Nominees are selected by a committee, with the winners decided by member vote.

Year	Category	Nominated work	Result	Ref.
2007	Original Music Performer	Himself	Nominated	
2007	Outstanding Club Performer of the Year	Himself	Nominated	
2008	Original Music Performer	Himself	Won	
2008	Outstanding Club Performer of the Year	Himself	Won	
2010	Original Music Performer	Himself	Won	

=== Australian and New Zealand Urban Music Awards ===
The Australian and New Zealand Urban Music Awards were held in 2006 and 2007. Nominees were selected by a panel of music industry figures, with the winners decided by public vote.

Year	Category	Nominated work	Result	Ref.
2006	Best R&B Single	"Oh Oh"	Nominated	
2006	Best Video Clip	"Oh Oh"	Won	
2006	Best Male Artist	Himself	Won	
2007	Best R&B Album	Closer to the Sun	Won	

=== Channel [V] Oz Artist of the Year ===
The Channel V Oz Artist of the Year Award is awarded annually. Channel V choose the original nominees, with public vote deciding the final ten, final four and overall winner.

Year	Category	Nominated work	Result	Ref.
2004	Oz Artist of the Year	Himself	Won	
2011	Oz Artist of the Year	Himself	Final 4	
2012	Oz Artist of the Year	Himself	Nominated	
2013	Oz Artist of the Year	Himself	Nominated	

=== Country Music Awards (CMAA) ===
The Country Music Awards of Australia (CMAA) (also known as the Golden Guitar Awards) is an annual awards night held in January during the Tamworth Country Music Festival, celebrating recording excellence in the Australian country music industry. They have been held annually since 1973.

Year	Nominee / work	Award	Result
2016	"Spirit of the Anzacs" (with Lee Kernaghan, Sheppard, Jessica Mauboy, Jon Stevens, Shannon Noll and Megan Washington)	Vocal Collaboration of the Year	Won
2016	"Spirit of the Anzacs" (with Lee Kernaghan, Sheppard, Jessica Mauboy, Jon Stevens, Shannon Noll and Megan Washington)	Video clip of the Year	Won

=== National Live Music Awards ===
The National Live Music Awards (NLMAs) are a broad recognition of Australia's diverse live industry, celebrating the success of the Australian live scene. The awards commenced in 2016.

Year	Nominee / work	Award	Result
2020	himself	Musicians Making a Difference	Won

=== Nickelodeon Kids' Choice Awards ===
The Australian Nickelodeon Kids' Choice Awards is an annual awards show for Australian and overseas entertainers. Nominees and winners are decided by public vote. In 2012 the Australian Awards were not held. Since 2013 Australian categories have been added to the US Kids' Choice Awards.

Year	Category	Nominated work	Result	Ref.
2004	Fave Music Video	"All I Need Is You"	Won	
2005	Fave Aussie	Himself	Won	
2005	Fave Music Video	"Oh Oh"	Won	
2005	Fave Hottie	Himself	Nominated	
2005	Fave Music Artist	Himself	Won	
2006	Fave Music Artist	Himself	Nominated	
2006	Fave Aussie	Himself	Won	
2007	Fave Male Singer	Himself	Nominated	
2009	So Hot Right Now	Himself	Won	
2010	Fave Aussie Muso	Himself	Nominated	
2011	Hall of Slime	Himself	Nominated	
2013	Aussie's Fave Homegrown Act	Himself	Nominated	
2016	Aussie's Favourite Pop Sensation	Himself	Nominated	
2017	Favourite Aussie/Kiwi Human Eva	Himself	Nominated	

=== MTV Europe Music Awards ===
Year	Category	Nominated work	Result
2015	Best Australian Act	Himself	Nominated

=== Australian MTV Awards ===
The Australian MTV Awards, formally known as the MTV Australia Video Music Awards were presented by MTV between 2005 and 2009. Nominees were chosen by MTV, with public vote deciding the winners.

Year	Category	Nominated work	Result	Ref.
2005	Best Pop Video	"Out with My Baby"	Won	
2007	Best Pop Video	"Elevator Love"	Won	

=== Australian GQ Awards ===
The Australian GQ Awards are held annually. The nominees for Man of the Year are selected by GQ magazine, with the public deciding the winner. The winners of all other categories are chosen by the magazine.

Year	Category	Nominated work	Result	Ref.
2012	Man of the Year	Himself	Nominated	
2012	Solo Artist of the Year	Himself	Won	

=== Advertiser Confidential/Scene Awards ===
The Advertiser is Adelaide's daily newspaper. Most years they hold the Scene Awards, formally known as the Confidential Awards. The public decide the winners from pools of nominees selected by the newspaper.

Year	Category	Nominated work	Result	Ref.
2005	Favourite Adelaide Celebrity	Himself	Won	
2006	Local Artist of the Year	Himself	Nominated	
2007	Local Artist of the Year	Himself	Won	

=== Dolly Teen Choice Awards ===
The Dolly Teen Choice Awards are presented by Dolly Magazine. The nominees are chosen by the magazine, and the winner is selected by public vote.

Year	Category	Nominated work	Result	Ref.
2006	Most Popular Album	Closer to the Sun	Won	
2008	Extreme Inspiration Award	For support of World Vision Australia	Won	
2010	Local Superstar of the Year	Himself	Nominated	

=== POPrepublic.tv IT List Awards ===
POPreplublic.tv is an Australian online entertainment and lifestyle magazine. Nominees for their IT List Awards are selected by the magazine, and winners are decided by public vote.

Year	Category	Nominated work	Result	Ref.
2006	Australian Male Artist	Himself	Won	
2010	Single of 2010	"Who's That Girl"	Nominated	
2010	Album of 2010	Twenty Ten	Nominated	
2010	Australian Male Artist	Himself	Nominated	
2010	Concert Tour of 2010	Like It Like That Tour	Nominated	
2011	Single of 2011	"Don't Worry Be Happy"	Nominated	
2011	Australian Male Artist	Himself	Won	
2012	Single of 2012	"Battle Scars"	Won	
2012	Album of 2012	Armageddon	Nominated	
2012	Australian Male Artist	Himself	Nominated	
2013	Single of 2013	"Like a Drum"	Nominated	
2013	Concert tour of 2013	Get Along Tour	Nominated	
2013	Australian Male Artist	Himself	Nominated	
2014	Album of 2014	"Madness"	Nominated	
2014	Australian Male Artist	Himself	Nominated	
2015	Single of 2015	"Tonight Again"	Nominated	
2015	Australian Male Artist	Himself	Won	
2015	Favourite Concert Tour / Live / Festival / Special event of 2015	2015 Tour.	Nominated	
2016	Single of 2016	"Set in Stone"	Nominated	
2016	Australian Male Artist	Himself	Nominated	

=== South Australian Music Awards ===
The South Australian Music Awards celebrated excellence in the South Australian contemporary music.

Year	Category	Nominated work	Result	Ref.
2024	Guy Sebastian	Hall of Fame	inducted	

=== World Music Awards ===
The World Music Awards honours the best-selling recording artists from every continent. They are presented on sales merit and voted by the public. The International Federation of the Phonographic Industry (IFPI) provides the organization with the names of the best-selling artists from all major territories.

Year	Category	Nominated work	Result	Ref.
2014	World's Best Album	Armageddon	Nominated	
2014	World's Best Song	"Like a Drum"	Nominated	
2014	World's Best Male Artist	Himself	Nominated	
2014	World's Best Entertainer	Himself	Nominated	
2014	World's Best Live Act	Himself	Nominated	

=== Other awards and recognition ===
Year	Award giving body	Award	Nominated work	Result	Ref.
2006	Australian Dance Music Awards	Best Urban Act	Himself	Nominated	
2006	Australia Day Council	Young Australian of the Year	Himself	State finalist	
2008	Helpmann Awards	Best Performance in an Australian Contemporary Concert	Himself for The Memphis Tour	Nominated	
2009	Bandit.fm	Single of the Year	"Like It Like That"	Won	
2010	Maddison Magazine Awards	Best Music Act	Himself	Nominated	
2010	Take 40 Australia	Favourite Artist	Himself	Won	
2010	Phonographic Performance; Company of Australia	Most Played Song on Radio	"Like It Like That"	Won	
2010	Mo Awards	Rock Performer of the Year	Himself	Won	
2012	NAACP Image Award	Outstanding Duo, Group or Collaboration	Himself with Lupe Fiasco for "Battle Scars"	Nominated	
2015	MTV Europe Music Awards	Best Australian Act	Himself	Nominated	
2016	Golden Guitar Awards	Vocal Collaboration of the Year	Himself with Lee Kernaghan, Jessica Mauboy, Jon Stevens, Amy & George Sheppard, Shannon Noll and Megan Washington for "Spirit of the Anzacs"	Won	
2019	Queen's Birthday Honours (Australia)	Member of the Order of Australia (AM)	Himself for "significant service to the music industry and charitable initiatives"	Won	
