= List of ARIA Music Awards and nominations received by Australian Idol contestants =

- Australian Idol ARIA Music Awards and nominations
Artist	Nominations	Wins
Guy Sebastian	34	7
Jessica Mauboy	31	2
Matt Corby	11	2
Shannon Noll	6	-
Lisa Mitchell	5	-
Stan Walker	5	-
Damien Leith	4	1
Anthony Callea	3	1
Joel Turner	3	-
Casey Donovan	2	-
Paulini, Kate DeAraugo, Lee Harding, Wes Carr, Ricki-Lee Coulter	1	-
- Totals
Nominations	109
Awards won	13
- Footnotes
- The "Nominated" cells of this infobox also includes works shortlisted and in top ten lists for public voted categories and pending results.

The Australian Recording Industry Association holds the ARIA Music Awards each year to recognise excellence, innovation and achievement in Australian music. The awards have industry judged and highest selling categories, and since 2010 public vote categories. Award nominees and winners, excluding those for sales and public voted categories, are selected by an academy of judges from all sectors of the music industry, including retail, radio and TV, journalists, record companies and previous winners. Australian Idol contestants have been nominated for 109 ARIA Awards since 2004, with 24 highest selling nominations, 34 nominations in publicly voted categories and 50 industry judged nominations. However, up until 2009 the nominations were mainly in the Highest Selling categories, with only five industry judged nominations being given. Since 2009 industry judged nominations have come more frequently for some Idol contestants. To date there have been 11 wins in sales and publicly voted categories, and in 2013 Season One winner Guy Sebastian and Season Four runner up Jessica Mauboy became the first Idol contestants to win industry voted ARIA Awards, Sebastian for Best Pop Release and Mauboy for Best Female Artist.Sebastian has received the most ARIA nominations with 34 including seven wins. Mauboy has had 31 nominations including two wins, and Season Five runner up Matt Corby has received 11 nominations including two wins.

The public vote categories were introduced in 2010, and are generally determined by the ten highest selling releases during the eligibility period, with the winner decided by the public. They replaced the Highest Selling Single and Album awards that year. All 2010 ARIA Award nominees were also automatically shortlisted for Most Popular Australian Artist, with the final five and winner chosen by public vote. In 2011 the ten nominees for Most Popular Australian Artist were the acts who had the highest selling albums or singles during the eligibility period. A Most Popular Live Performer category was also introduced in 2011. It had no original nominee list, and any Australian musician who had performed live in Australia during the eligibility period could be voted for. From 2012 this category was changed to Best Live Act and the nominees were chosen by ARIA, with public vote only deciding the winner. A Best Video category was also introduced with the same voting system. Also in 2012 the highest selling single and album categories were again removed. The peer voted Single of the Year was also removed, and replaced with a publicly voted Song of the Year award. Nominees for this award are the ten highest selling Australian single releases during the eligibility period. Artists are only allowed to be nominated for one song, even if they have more than one in the top ten, and songs must have been released as singles during the eligibility period.

== Aria Awards by Year and Artist ==
ARIA Music Awards
Artist	Year	Nominated work	Category	Result
Guy Sebastian	2004	Just As I Am	Highest Selling Album	Nominated
Guy Sebastian	2004	"Angels Brought Me Here"	Highest Selling Single	Won
Guy Sebastian	2005	Beautiful Life	Highest Selling Album	Nominated
Guy Sebastian	2008	The Memphis Album	Highest Selling Album	Nominated
Guy Sebastian	2010	Like It Like That	Best Pop Release	Nominated
Guy Sebastian	2010	Like It Like That	Most Popular Australian Album	Final 5
Guy Sebastian	2010	Himself for Like It Like That	Best Male Artist	Nominated
Guy Sebastian	2010	Himself	Most Popular Australian Artist	Final 5
Guy Sebastian	2010	"Like It Like That"	Most Popular Australian Single	Final 5
Guy Sebastian	2010	"Art of Love" (featuring Jordin Sparks)	Most Popular Australian Single	Top 10
Guy Sebastian	2011	"Who's That Girl" (featuring Eve)	Single of the Year	Nominated
Guy Sebastian	2011	"Who's That Girl" (featuring Eve)	Best Pop Release	Nominated
Guy Sebastian	2011	"Who's That Girl" (featuring Eve)	Highest Selling Single	Won
Guy Sebastian	2011	Himself	Most Popular Australian Artist	Top 10
Guy Sebastian	2012	"Battle Scars" (featuring Lupe Fiasco)	Best Pop Release	Nominated
Guy Sebastian	2012	Himself for "Battle Scars"	Best Male Artist	Nominated
Guy Sebastian	2012	"Don't Worry Be Happy"	Song of the Year	Nominated
Guy Sebastian	2013	Armageddon	Album of the Year	Nominated
Guy Sebastian	2013	Himself for Armageddon	Best Male Artist	Nominated
Guy Sebastian	2013	Armageddon	Best Pop Release	Won
Guy Sebastian	2013	Himself for the Get Along Tour	Best Live Act	Won
Guy Sebastian	2013	"Get Along"	Song of the Year	Nominated
Guy Sebastian	2014	Himself for "Come Home With Me"	Best Male Artist	Nominated
Guy Sebastian	2014	"Like a Drum"	Song of the Year	Nominated
Guy Sebastian	2015	Himself for "Tonight Again"	Best Male Artist	Nominated
Guy Sebastian	2016	Himself for "Black & Blue"	Best Male Artist	Nominated
Guy Sebastian	2016	"Black & Blue"	Video of the Year	Nominated
Guy Sebastian	2017	"Set in Stone"	Song of the Year	Nominated
Guy Sebastian	2019	Himself for "Choir"	Best Male Artist	Nominated
Guy Sebastian	2019	"Choir"	Best Pop Release	Nominated
Guy Sebastian	2019	"Choir"	Song of the Year	Won
Guy Sebastian	2019	"Choir"	Best Video	Won
Guy Sebastian	2020	Himself for "Standing with You"	Best Male Artist	Nominated
Guy Sebastian	2020	"Standing with You"	Video of the Year	Won
Jessica Mauboy	2009	Been Waiting	Highest Selling Album	Nominated
Jessica Mauboy	2009	Been Waiting	Best Pop Release	Nominated
Jessica Mauboy	2009	Been Waiting	Breakthrough Artist Album	Nominated
Jessica Mauboy	2009	"Running Back" (featuring Flo Rida)	Breakthrough Artist Single	Nominated
Jessica Mauboy	2009	"Running Back" (featuring Flo Rida)	Highest Selling Single	Won
Jessica Mauboy	2009	Herself for Been Waiting	Best Female Artist	Nominated
Jessica Mauboy	2009	"Burn"	Highest Selling Single	Nominated
Jessica Mauboy	2011	"Saturday Night" (featuring Ludacris)	Highest Selling Single	Nominated
Jessica Mauboy	2011	Herself	Most Popular Australian Artist	Final 5
Jessica Mauboy	2012	"Gotcha"	Best Pop Release	Nominated
Jessica Mauboy	2012	Herself for "Gotcha"	Best Female Artist	Nominated
Jessica Mauboy	2012	"Galaxy" (featuring Stan Walker)	Song of the Year	Nominated
Jessica Mauboy	2013	Herself for "To the End of the Earth"	Best Female Artist	Won
Jessica Mauboy	2014	Beautiful	Album of the Year	Nominated
Jessica Mauboy	2014	Herself for Beautiful	Best Female Artist	Nominated
Jessica Mauboy	2014	"Never Be the Same"	Video of the Year	Nominated
Jessica Mauboy	2015	Herself for "Can I Get a Moment?"	Best Female Artist	Nominated
Jessica Mauboy	2016	Herself for "This Ain't Love"	Best Female Artist	Nominated
Jessica Mauboy	2017	Herself for The Secret Daughter: Songs from the Original TV Series	Best Female Artist	Nominated
Jessica Mauboy	2017	The Secret Daughter: Songs from the Original TV Series	Best Original Soundtrack, Cast or Show Album	Nominated
Jessica Mauboy	2017	"Fallin'"	Best Pop Release	Nominated
Jessica Mauboy	2017	"Fallin'"	Song of the Year	Nominated
Jessica Mauboy	2017	"Fallin'"	Video of the Year	Nominated
Jessica Mauboy	2017	Herself	Best Live Act	Nominated
Jessica Mauboy	2018	The Secret Daughter Season Two: Songs from the Original 7 Series	Best Original Soundtrack, Cast or Show Album	Nominated
Jessica Mauboy	2019	Herself for "Little Things"	Best Female Artist	Nominated
Jessica Mauboy	2019	Best Video	Little Things	Nominated
Jessica Mauboy	2020	Herself for Hilda	Album of the Year	Nominated
Jessica Mauboy	2023	Best Video	Give You Love" (featuring Jason Derulo)	Nominated
Jessica Mauboy	2024	Best Pop Release	"Yours Forever"	Nominated
Jessica Mauboy	2024	Song of the Year	"Give You Love" (featuring Jason Derulo)	Nominated
Matt Corby	2012	"Brother"	Breakthrough Artist Release	Nominated
Matt Corby	2012	Himself for Into the Flame (EP)	Best Male Artist	Nominated
Matt Corby	2012	"Brother"	Song of the Year	Won
Matt Corby	2013	Himself for "Resolution"	Best Male Artist	Nominated
Matt Corby	2013	"Resolution"	Song of the Year	Won
Matt Corby	2013	"Resolution"	Best video	Nominated
Matt Corby	2013	Himself for the Resolution Tour	Best Live Act	Nominated
Matt Corby	2016	Telluric	Best Adult Alternative Album	Nominated
Matt Corby	2019	Himself for Rainbow Valley	Best Male Artist	Nominated
Matt Corby	2019	Best Soul/R&B Release	Rainbow Valley	Nominated
Matt Corby	2023	Everything's Fine	Album of the Year	Nominated
Shannon Noll	2004	That's What I'm Talking About	Highest Selling Album	Nominated
Shannon Noll	2004	"What About Me"	Highest Selling Single	Nominated
Shannon Noll	2006	Lift	Best Pop Release	Nominated
Shannon Noll	2006	"Shine"	Highest Selling Single	Nominated
Shannon Noll	2007	"Don't Give Up" (with Natalie; Bassingthwaighte)	Highest Selling Single	Nominated
Shannon Noll	2011	Himself	Most Popular Live Performer	Nominated
Lisa Mitchell	2009	Wonder	Breakthrough Artist - Album	Nominated
Lisa Mitchell	2009	"Coin Laundry"	Breakthrough Artist – Single	Nominated
Lisa Mitchell	2009	Herself for Wonder	Best Female Artist	Nominated
Lisa Mitchell	2010	Herself for "Oh! Hark!"	Best Female Artist	Nominated
Lisa Mitchell	2010	Herself	Most Popular Australian Artist	Shortlisted
Stan Walker	2010	Introducing... Stan Walker	Most Popular Australian Album	Top 10
Stan Walker	2010	"Black Box"	Most Popular Australian Single	Top 10
Stan Walker	2010	Himself	Most Popular Australian Artist	Shortlisted
Stan Walker	2011	Himself	Most Popular Australian Artist	Top 10
Stan Walker	2012	"Galaxy" (featured artist on Jessica Mauboy song)	Song of the Year	Nominated
Damien Leith	2007	The Winner's Journey	Highest Selling Album	Won
Damien Leith	2007	"Night of My Life"	Breakthrough Artist – Single	Nominated
Damien Leith	2007	"Night of My Life"	Highest Selling Single	Nominated
Damien Leith	2011	Roy	Best Adult Contemporary Album	Nominated
Anthony Callea	2005	"The Prayer"	Highest Selling Single	Won
Anthony Callea	2005	"Rain"/"Bridge over Troubled; Water"	Highest Selling Single	Nominated
Anthony Callea	2005	Anthony Callea	Highest selling Album	Nominated
Joel Turner	2005	Joel Turner and the Modern; Day Poets	Best Urban Release	Nominated
Joel Turner	2005	Joel Turner and the Modern; Day Poets	Best Independent Release	Nominated
Joel Turner	2005	"These Kids"	Breakthrough Artist Single	Nominated
Casey Donovan	2005	For You	Highest Selling Album	Nominated
Casey Donovan	2005	"Listen with Your Heart"	Highest Selling Single	Nominated
Paulini	2004	"Angel Eyes"	Highest Selling Single	Nominated
Kate DeAraugo	2006	"Maybe Tonight"	Highest Selling Single	Nominated
Lee Harding	2006	"Wasabi"/"Eye of the Tiger"	Highest Selling Single	Nominated
Wes Carr	2009	"You"	Highest Selling Single	Nominated
Ricki-Lee Coulter	2012	"Do It Like That"	Song of the Year	Nominated
Dylan Wright	2025	Half the World Away	Best Country Album	Nominated
