= List of top 10 singles for 2012 in Australia =

This is a list of singles that charted in the top ten of the ARIA Charts in 2012.

== Top-ten singles ==
Key

Symbol	Meaning
◁	Indicates single's top 10 entry was also its ARIA top 50 debut
(#)	2012 Year-end top 10 single position and rank

List of ARIA top ten singles that peaked in 2012
Top ten entry date	Single	Artist(s)	Peak	Peak date	Weeks in top ten	References
Singles from 2011
31 October	"Pumped Up Kicks"	Foster the People	1	16 January	8	
21 November	"What Makes You Beautiful"	One Direction	7	2 January	9	
28 November	"Young, Wild & Free"	Snoop Dogg and Wiz Khalifa featuring Bruno Mars	4	2 January	7	
28 November	"Hangover"	Taio Cruz featuring Flo Rida	3	2 January	7	
28 November	"Don't Worry Be Happy" ◁	Guy Sebastian	5	2 January	10	
5 December	"Paradise"	Coldplay	3	9 January	13	
Singles from 2012
16 January	"Set It Off"	Timomatic	2	23 January	5	
16 January	"Wild Ones" (#5)	Flo Rida featuring Sia	1	23 January	13	
23 January	"Hey Hey Hey (Pop Another Bottle)"	Laurent Wéry featuring Swift K.I.D and Dev	2	30 January	6	
23 January	"Summer Paradise"	Simple Plan featuring Sean Paul	4	30 January	5	
23 January	"Turn Me On"	David Guetta featuring Nicki Minaj	3	23 January	6	
30 January	"Brother"	Matt Corby	3	6 February	2	
6 February	"I Love It"	Hilltop Hoods featuring Sia	6	6 February	3	
6 February	"Boys Like You"	360 featuring Gossling	3	13 February	8	
6 February	"Lonely Boy"	The Black Keys	2	6 February	3	
13 February	"Take Care"	Drake featuring Rihanna	9	13 February	1	
20 February	"Ass Back Home"	Gym Class Heroes featuring Neon Hitch	1	5 March	8	
27 February	"Fight for You"	Jason Derulo	5	5 March	7	
27 February	"Turn Up the Music"	Chris Brown	6	27 February	5	
27 February	"Part of Me"	Katy Perry	5	27 February	3	
27 February	"Throw Your Hands Up (Dançar Kuduro)"	Qwote featuring Pitbull and Lucenzo	3	5 March	6	
5 March	"Starships" (#6)	Nicki Minaj	2	19 March	15	
5 March	"One Thing"	One Direction	3	16 April	5	
5 March	"We Are Young"	Fun featuring Janelle Monáe	1	12 March	9	
12 March	"Bangarang"	Skrillex featuring Sirah	4	26 March	6	
19 March	"Troublemaker"	Taio Cruz	10	19 March	1	
26 March	"Call Me Maybe" (#1)	Carly Rae Jepsen	1	2 April	16	
2 April	"Boyfriend" ◁	Justin Bieber	5	2 April	1	
2 April	"Earthquake"	Labrinth featuring Tinie Tempah	4	2 April	6	
9 April	"If Looks Could Kill"	Timomatic	8	9 April	2	
9 April	"Lego House"	Ed Sheeran	4	30 April	11	
23 April	"Never Let Me Go"	Florence and the Machine	3	23 April	7	
23 April	"Sitting on Top of the World" ◁	Delta Goodrem	2	23 April	6	
30 April	"Whistle" (#4) ◁	Flo Rida	1	7 May	13	
30 April	"Payphone" ◁	Maroon 5 featuring Wiz Khalifa	2	4 June	12	
30 April	"Shut Up & Kiss Me" ◁	Reece Mastin	2	30 April	2	
7 May	"So Good"	B.o.B	9	7 May	2	
14 May	"Big Jet Plane"	Lakyn Heperi	10	14 May	1	
14 May	"Where Have You Been"	Rihanna	6	14 May	5	
21 May	"Nothing's Real but Love" ◁	Karise Eden	9	21 May	1	
21 May	"Back in Time"	Pitbull	4	4 June	5	
4 June	"Gold" ◁	Guy Sebastian	10	4 June	1	
4 June	"Don't Wake Me Up" ◁	Chris Brown	2	2 July	8	
11 June	"The Fighter"	Gym Class Heroes featuring Ryan Tedder	7	18 June	5	
18 June	"Pound the Alarm"	Nicki Minaj	10	18 June	2	
18 June	"How We Do (Party)"	Rita Ora	9	18 June	2	
18 June	"Hallelujah" ◁	Karise Eden	2	18 June	2	
25 June	"You Won't Let Me" ◁	Karise Eden	5	25 June	2	
25 June	"Beautiful" ◁	Sarah De Bono	4	25 June	1	
25 June	"I Was Your Girl" ◁	Karise Eden	3	25 June	1	
25 June	"Stay with Me Baby" ◁	Karise Eden	1	25 June	1	
2 July	"This Is Love"	Will.i.am featuring Eva Simons	7	2 July	5	
2 July	"Wide Awake"	Katy Perry	4	2 July	6	
9 July	"Feel the Love"	Rudimental featuring John Newman	3	16 July	7	
9 July	"Some Nights"	Fun	1	23 July	9	
9 July	"Shout It Out" ◁	Reece Mastin	1	9 July	1	
16 July	"Boom Boom" (#7)	Justice Crew	1	6 August	12	
16 July	"Blow Me (One Last Kiss)" ◁	Pink	1	16 July	6	
23 July	"Good Time"	Owl City and Carly Rae Jepsen	5	13 August	11	
23 July	"One More Night"	Maroon 5	2	6 August	10	
30 July	"Brokenhearted"	Karmin	9	30 July	1	
30 July	"As Long as You Love Me"	Justin Bieber featuring Big Sean	8	30 July	3	
6 August	"Spectrum (Say My Name)"	Florence and the Machine featuring Calvin Harris	4	13 August	5	
6 August	"Both of Us"	B.o.B featuring Taylor Swift	5	6 August	2	
13 August	"We'll Be Coming Back"	Calvin Harris featuring Example	8	20 August	2	
20 August	"Drunk"	Ed Sheeran	9	20 August	1	
20 August	"Battle Scars" (#3) ◁	Guy Sebastian and Lupe Fiasco	1	20 August	12	
27 August	"Turn Up the Love"	Far East Movement featuring Cover Drive	8	27 August	4	
27 August	"Hall of Fame" ◁	The Script featuring Will.i.am	4	8 October	11	
27 August	"Skinny Love" (#8) ◁	Birdy	2	3 September	10	
27 August	"We Are Never Ever Getting Back Together"	Taylor Swift	3	27 August	7	
3 September	"People Help the People"	Birdy	10	3 September	1	
10 September	"I Cry" ◁	Flo Rida	3	10 September	6	
17 September	"Gangnam Style" (#2) ◁	Psy	1	1 October	16	
24 September	"Try" ◁	Pink	6	15 October	4	
1 October	"R.I.P."	Rita Ora featuring Tinie Tempah	10	1 October	2	
1 October	"Let Me Love You (Until You Learn to Love Yourself)"	Ne-Yo	8	1 October	1	
8 October	"Diamonds" ◁	Rihanna	6	29 October	7	
8 October	"Live While We're Young" ◁	One Direction	2	8 October	2	
15 October	"Die Young"	Kesha	3	19 November	5	
15 October	"Skyfall" ◁	Adele	5	15 October	1	
22 October	"I Knew You Were Trouble"	Taylor Swift	3	10 December	12	
22 October	"Bom Bom"	Sam and the Womp	4	26 November	7	
22 October	"Wish You Were Here" ◁	Delta Goodrem	5	29 October	2	
22 October	"Sweet Nothing" ◁	Calvin Harris featuring Florence Welch	2	22 October	5	
29 October	"Locked Out of Heaven"	Bruno Mars	4	5 November	10	
29 October	"Don't You Worry Child" (#10)	Swedish House Mafia featuring John Martin	1	12 November	12	
5 November	"Wings"	Little Mix	3	12 November	2	
12 November	"Little Talks"	Of Monsters and Men	7	10 December	7	
19 November	"Little Things" ◁	One Direction	9	19 November	2	
19 November	"Thrift Shop" (#9)	Macklemore & Ryan Lewis featuring Wanz	1	3 December	14	
26 November	"Get Along"	Guy Sebastian	5	26 November	2	
26 November	"What You've Done to Me" ◁	Samantha Jade	1	26 November	3	
3 December	"Surrender" ◁	The Collective	6	3 December	1	
10 December	"Give Me Love"	Ed Sheeran	9	10 December	1	
10 December	"Scream & Shout"	Will.i.am featuring Britney Spears	2	16 December	10	
10 December	"Troublemaker"	Olly Murs featuring Flo Rida	4	10 December	8	
17 December	"Best Night"	Justice Crew	7	24 December	2	
31 December	"Beauty and a Beat"	Justin Bieber featuring Nicki Minaj	9	31 December	2	

=== 1992 peaks ===
List of ARIA top ten singles in 2012 that peaked in 1992
Top ten entry date	Single	Artist(s)	Peak	Peak date	Weeks in top ten	References
6 December	"I Will Always Love You"	Whitney Houston	1	13 December	16	

=== 2011 peaks ===
List of ARIA top ten singles in 2012 that peaked in 2011
Top ten entry date	Single	Artist(s)	Peak	Peak date	Weeks in top ten	References
10 October	"Sexy and I Know It"	LMFAO	1	17 October	15	
17 October	"Good Feeling"	Flo Rida	4	7 November	14	
14 November	"The A Team"	Ed Sheeran	2	21 November	8	
21 November	"Dedication to My Ex (Miss That)"	Lloyd featuring André 3000 and Lil Wayne	6	19 December	7	
28 November	"Good Night" ◁	Reece Mastin	1	28 November	8	
12 December	"Breathing"	Jason Derulo	9	12 December	3	

=== 2013 peaks ===
List of ARIA top ten singles in 2012 that peaked in 2013
Top ten entry date	Single	Artist(s)	Peak	Peak date	Weeks in top ten	References
17 December	"I Love It"	Icona Pop featuring Charli XCX	3	7 January	9	
24 December	"Beneath Your Beautiful"	Labrinth featuring Emeli Sandé	5	4 March	9	

== Entries by artist ==
The following table shows artists who achieved two or more top 10 entries in 2012, including songs that reached their peak in 2011 and 2013. The figures include both main artists and featured artists. The total number of weeks an artist spent in the top ten in 2012 is also shown.

Entries	Artist	Weeks	Songs
6	Flo Rida	38	"Good Feeling", "Hangover", "I Cry", "Troublemaker", "Whistle", "Wild Ones"
5	Karise Eden	4	"Hallelujah", "I Was Your Girl", "Nothing's Real but Love", "Stay with Me Baby", "You Won't Let Me"
4	Ed Sheeran	14	"Drunk", "Give Me Love", "Lego House", "The A Team"
4	Guy Sebastian	20	"Battle Scars", "Don't Worry Be Happy", "Get Along", "Gold"
4	Nicki Minaj	24	"Beauty and a Beat", "Pound the Alarm", "Starships", "Turn Me On"
4	One Direction	13	"Little Things", "Live While We're Young", "One Thing", "What Makes You Beautiful"
3	Calvin Harris	10	"Spectrum (Say My Name)", "Sweet Nothing", "We'll Be Coming Back"
3	Justin Bieber	5	"As Long as You Love Me", "Beauty and a Beat", "Boyfriend"
3	Reece Mastin	6	"Good Night", "Shout It Out", "Shut Up & Kiss Me"
3	Rihanna	13	"Diamonds", "Take Care", "Where Have You Been"
3	Taylor Swift	18	"Both of Us", "I Knew You Were Trouble", "We Are Never Getting Back Together"
3	Will.i.am	20	"Hall of Fame", "Scream & Shout", "This is Love"
2	Birdy	10	"People Help the People", "Skinny Love"
2	B.o.B	4	"Both of Us", "So Good"
2	Bruno Mars	14	"Locked Out of Heaven", "Young, Wild & Free"
2	Carly Rae Jepsen	27	"Call Me Maybe", "Good Time"
2	Chris Brown	13	"Don't Wake Me Up", "Turn Up the Music"
2	Delta Goodrem	8	"Sitting on Top of the World", "Wish You Were Here"
2	Florence and the Machine	12	"Never Let Me Go", "Spectrum (Say My Name)"
2	Fun	18	"Some Nights", "We Are Young"
2	Gym Class Heroes	13	"Ass Back Home", "The Fighter"
2	Jason Derulo	8	"Breathing", "Fight for You"
2	Justice Crew	14	"Best Night", "Boom Boom"
2	Katy Perry	9	"Part of Me", "Wide Awake"
2	Labrinth	7	"Beneath Your Beautiful", "Earthquake"
2	Maroon 5	22	"One More Night", "Payphone"
2	Pink	10	"Blow Me (One Last Kiss)", "Try"
2	Pitbull	11	"Back in Time", "Throw Your Hands Up (Dançar Kuduro)"
2	Rita Ora	4	"How We Do (Party)", "R.I.P."
2	Sia	13	"I Love It", "Wild Ones"
2	Taio Cruz	3	"Hangover", "Troublemaker"
2	Timomatic	7	"If Looks Could Kill", "Set It Off"
2	Tinie Tempah	8	"Earthquake", "R.I.P."
2	Wiz Khalifa	17	"Payphone", "Young, Wild & Free"

== See also ==
- 2012 in music
- ARIA Charts
- List of number-one singles of 2012 (Australia)
- List of top 25 singles for 2012 in Australia
