= Armageddon (Guy Sebastian album) =

Studio album by Guy Sebastian
- Released: 12 October 2012
- Recorded: 2011–2012
- Genres: Pop, R&B, soul, pop rock
- Length: 47:56
- Label: Sony Music
- Producers: Ian Barter, Tim Deal, DNA, Hasham "Sham" Hussain, Denarius "Motesart" Motes, Pro-Jay, Harmony "H-Money" Samuels, Louis Schoorl, Guy Sebastian

Guy Sebastian chronology
| Twenty Ten (2010) | Armageddon (2012) | Madness (2014) |

Singles from Armageddon
- 1. "Don't Worry Be Happy" Released: 18 November 2011; 2. "Gold" Released: 11 May 2012; 3. "Battle Scars" Released: 10 August 2012; 4. "Get Along" Released: 10 November 2012

Armageddon is the sixth studio album by Australian singer-songwriter Guy Sebastian. It was released in digital and CD format on 12 October 2012. A deluxe edition featuring a DVD of a concert from Sebastian's Armageddon Tour was also available. The album reached number one and triple platinum certification in Australia, and number 20 and platinum certification in New Zealand. Including his compilation album Twenty Ten, it was Sebastian's seventh of eleven top ten albums in Australia, and also his second of three number ones. It was the ninth highest selling album in Australia in 2012, the second highest selling album by an Australian act.

Sebastian has received a number of accolades for the album and its songs. He was nominated for three 2012 ARIA Music Awards, Best Male Artist and Best Pop Release for "Battle Scars", and Song of the Year for "Don't Worry Be Happy". "Battle Scars" was nominated for an NAACP Image Award and won the R&B/Hip category in the 2013 International Songwriting Competition. "Get Along" was a final five nominee for the 2013 APRA Song of the Year Award and "Don't Worry Be Happy" was nominated for Pop Work of the Year. Sebastian won Best Pop Release for Armageddon at the 2013 ARIA Awards and Best Live Act for the Get Along Tour. He received three other nominations, including Album of the Year.

== Background and development ==
Although Sebastian released the retrospective album Twenty Ten in 2010, Armageddon is his first studio album since Like It Like That, an album of original soul music, was released in October 2009. Armageddon, while mainly pop with some R&B songs, still shows the soul influences that Like it Like That did on many of the songs. Sebastian has said he grew up listening to old school soul music from artists like Sam Cooke, Otis Redding, Donny Hathaway, and Stevie Wonder, and they had always been his strongest musical influences. He said early in his career he was steered away from soul music, advised it wouldn't sell in Australia. After he released The Memphis Album, a cover album of Memphis soul classics he recorded with members the MGs including Steve Cropper, he realised there was a market, and he felt he could now do the style of music he had always wanted to.

In an interview about Armageddon Sebastian spoke of how much The Memphis Album still influences his music, "I headed across to Memphis and was very inspired by the music scene there. I got to work with some people who were instrumental in shaping the careers of artists who heavily influence me. Artists like Otis Redding, Sam & Dave and Sam Cooke. Being entrenched in that sort of environment really caused me to go 'You know what dude. Do what you want to do. Do what comes natural to you'." Sebastian said it was a turning point for him, adding, "From that Memphis thing a few years ago it's always going to start with me being true to who I want to be and what I enjoy singing." Sebastian feels his soul roots remained even when he delved into electro dance music with the single "Who's That Girl" from his previous album, explaining it was an old school Sam Cooke type of melody, with modern lyrics, over a dance track. He said, "I had that melody, and I could have gone so many ways with it. I could have produced an old-school soul song, but I went towards what you hear on the radio."

Armageddon was originally slated for release mid-2012, but it was delayed because Sebastian wanted to be completely happy with it before it was released. He said, "It's the longest I have spent with an album but I'm not rushing it for a TV performance or anything. It will happen when it's ready". He explained he had approached Armageddon in a different way than his previous albums, "I haven't sat down to write an album, I've just been writing whatever I feel. I'm still learning what defines me as an artist. There's stuff in there that radio won't touch but it needs to be there and I think it lifts the album. [...] I've done most of it myself and I've really taken my time." While the album has the upbeat happy music and love songs he is known for, Sebastian said becoming a father earlier in the year brought new awareness, and he started analysing the world his son would grow up in. He explained it gave him a broader perspective, and while he had always taken notice of the state of world affairs, he had never written about it in song before. Because of this he said the album has more light and shade, "there's definitely moments where it has a bit more depth to it -- it's not just 'I love you, do you love me too?' Obviously there's some love songs in there, but there's also a bit more commentary on the world that my little boy (Hudson) is going to inherit." When asked to give five words that could describe the album Sebastian used the words "dark", "reflective", "happy", "appreciative" and "anxious".

== Singles ==
Four top ten singles were released from the album, including "Don't Worry Be Happy","Battle Scars" which features Lupe Fiasco and "Get Along". "Don't Worry Be Happy" peaked at number five and gained 5× platinum certification, with "Battle Scars" reaching number one and 14× platinum. "Battle Scars" is Sebastian's sixth number one single in Australia and Fiasco's first. "Battle Scars" also reached number two and 3× platinum certification in New Zealand, number 71 and 3× platinum certification in the US, and number two in Norway. "Get Along" has been certified 3× platinum. "Get Along" peaked at number five and jas been certified 3× platinum.

== Writing and composition ==
Five of the songs on Armageddon are written by Sebastian alone, while the others have at least one co-writer. Sebastian began writing songs which appear on the album almost two years before its release, and performed two of them, "Summer Love" and "Keeper", while touring as a support act on Lionel Richie's Australian and New Zealand tour in March 2011. Both are pop songs, with "Keeper" having a reggae feel. "Summer Love" is about bittersweet feelings for a lost love, and "Keeper" is about finding that special love, the one who is a keeper. "Don't Worry Be Happy", released as the lead single in November 2012, is an upbeat pop song Sebastian wrote after he encountered an angry motorist in Los Angeles. Discussing the inspiration for the track he explained he could sometimes be caught up in a little bit of "glass half empty" in his life, and wrote the song as a reminder to himself and hopefully to others that life is too short to stress about the small things. Sebastian showcased two more songs, "Amnesia" and "Armageddon", at the "Don't Worry Be Happy" media launch in December 2011. "Amnesia" is a soulful pop ballad about the anguish of coping with a broken relationship. Sebastian says of the power ballad "Armageddon", "The title track might sound pretty dark, but it's actually about not taking love for granted, and living like tomorrow is the last day on earth".

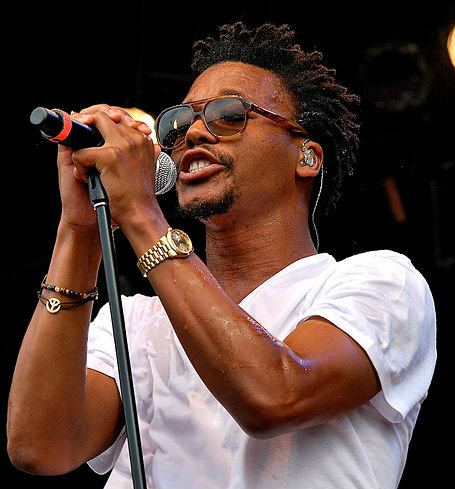
Lupe Fiasco collaborated on "Battle Scars". Sebastian said of Fiasco, "He is a lyrical genius and he has really portrayed the emotion of the track".

"Get Along" deals with the damage inflicted by religious, racial and cultural intolerance, asking why the world can't just get along. It is a stripped back track with minimal instrumental accompaniment. Sebastian explained why he wrote the song, "It sends your brain into overload when you are expecting your first child. It definitely makes you take a step back and try to gain some perspective on this world we live in". "Big Bad World" was written for his son Hudson who was born in March 2012. He said, "It's about that promise we all make to our kids, but realise we don't have as much control as we think. We want to protect them from the big bad world, but the promise matters the most." "Used to You" is a song Sebastian wrote for his wife Jules. He said, "I always say to her, 'I don't get used to you'. I still get back from tours and I'm still excited to see her. [...] We've been friends for 18 years, together for 13 years. I'm lucky".

"Beg" is a midtempo pop song with a percussion-driven chorus, about a relationship growing distant. "Died and Gone to Heaven" is an old school R&B song of love and passion, which features big harmonies and falsetto vocals. "Gold" is an uptempo soul song. Sebastian inserted a horn line into it from "Shake", a live recording of an Otis Redding track. He said, "You hear an old soul track, old Motown or Memphis, and it just makes you get on your feet." "Battle Scars", a collaboration with Lupe Fiasco, is an R&B ballad with a hip hop rap about the scars left from hurtful and broken relationships. Sebastian said that usually when he writes a song he comes up with the melody first with no words, but this time some of the lyrics came at the same time. After finishing the song with David Ryan Harris it was recorded leaving the parts where Sebastian envisaged the rap should go. When Fiasco was in Australia for Supafest, Sebastian recorded his rap at his Sydney studio.

== Release and promotion ==
Armageddon was released on October 12, 2012. With the release date originally anticipated to be mid-2012, the lead single "Don't Worry Be Happy" was released 11 months before the album. Sebastian performed the song during the 2011 The X-Factor Grand Final, and also as a medley with "Who's That Girl" at the 2011 ARIA Music Awards. In early February 2012 the album title and a June/July tour to coincide with the album release were announced. The second single Gold was released in May, and Sebastian performed it on Dancing with the Stars and Australia's Got Talent. He had media interviews in the first half of the year to discuss the album's progress. The Armageddon Tour went ahead in June with no news of a release date for the album. In a later interview Sebastian explained, "So I was going to try and finish the album for the tour and have it ready because that would have been ideal, but it just wasn't ready. And I wrote a couple of other songs that I felt really needed to go on the album."

The third single "Battle Scars" was serviced to Australian radio on 2 August 2012, a week before it was released digitally. It was the most added song to radio in its first week, and became the most played song on Australian radio in its seventh week, where it remained for two weeks. Sebastian did a number media interviews in the week the song was released. In mid September Fiasco came to Australia to promote the single and his own album, and he and Sebastian held further interviews. On 18 September the cover art, track listing and release date of Armageddon was announced. Sebastian and Fiasco performed Battle Scars live for the first time on X Factor that night. They also performed it on the Late Show with David Letterman on 27 September, to promote the song in the US. Fiasco had added it to his album Food & Liquor II: The Great American Rap Album Pt. 1 in countries other than Australia, credited as a duet, and released it as the fourth single in the US. The show was aired in Australia the following day. "Battle Scars" was used in the US for the TV promotion of the movie Red Dawn.

Sebastian had media interviews in the weeks leading up to and during Armageddon's release week, saying in one, "I think it's definitely time. I've released a few singles from this album already, like 'Don't Worry Be Happy', 'Gold' and 'Battle Scars', so three singles deep I should probably get the album out". The fourth single "Get Along" was serviced to radio in the first week in November. Sebastian performed "Get Along" and "Battle Scars" on the Seven Network's morning program Sunrise on November 12. He also performed "Get Along" on the first night of the 2012 X Factor Grand Final on November 19. On 29 November Sebastian and Fiasco performed "Battle Scars" at the 2012 ARIA Music Awards. Sebastian and Fiasco continued the US promotion of "Battle Scars" in early 2013, performing the song on Late Night with Jimmy Fallon with The Roots, and on Conan. Both shows are also shown in Australia.

=== Singles ===
"Don't Worry Be Happy" was released as Armageddon's lead single on November 18, 2011. It peaked at number five and, although only released in mid November, was the sixth highest selling Australian artist single of 2011. The song spent 19 weeks in the ARIA Top 50, including ten weeks in the top ten and was certified 5× platinum in 2020.

"Gold" was released as the second single on May 11, 2012. It peaked at number ten, and was certified platinum. There was some controversy surrounding the song. Carmen Smith who contributes significant vocals to the track, although not credited as a featured artist, was disqualified as a contestant from The Voice for appearing in the video. Smith had worked with Sebastian for years, and later stated The Voice producers were aware of this, and that she had a clause in her contract which allowed her to continue to perform and record with him. She thought appearing in the video would be permitted under her contract. However they said she was breaking the "spirit" of the rules, as it might give her an unfair advantage over the other contestants."

"Battle Scars" featuring Lupe Fiasco was released as the third single on August 10, 2012. It debuted at number one, Sebastian's sixth number one single in Australia and Fiasco's first. Sebastian has achieved the most number one singles for an Australian male singer in Australian chart history. "Battle Scars" moved him into outright third place for all Australian acts, with only Kylie Minogue and Delta Goodrem having achieved more. The song remained at number one for six consecutive weeks and has been certified 14× platinum. "Battle Scars" was the third highest selling song in Australia in 2012, the highest selling single by an Australian act. It also reached number two and 3× platinum certification in New Zealand. It charted at number 71 on the US Billboard Hot 100. In addition to the Hot 100, it reached number 23 on the Billboard Digital Songs Chart and number one on the Billboard R&B/Hip-hop Digital Song Chart. The song spent 20 weeks in the Billboard Hot 100 and has been certified 3× platinum for sales of three million. "Battle Scars" also reached number two in Norway.

"Get Along" was released as the fourth single on 10 November 2012, and debuted at number 34, rising to number five the following week. It was Sebastian's 11th top ten single in Australia. It achieved 3× platinum certification in 2019. "Get Along" also reached number nine and gold certification in New Zealand, Sebastian's sixth top ten single there.

=== Tours ===
==== Armageddon Tour ====
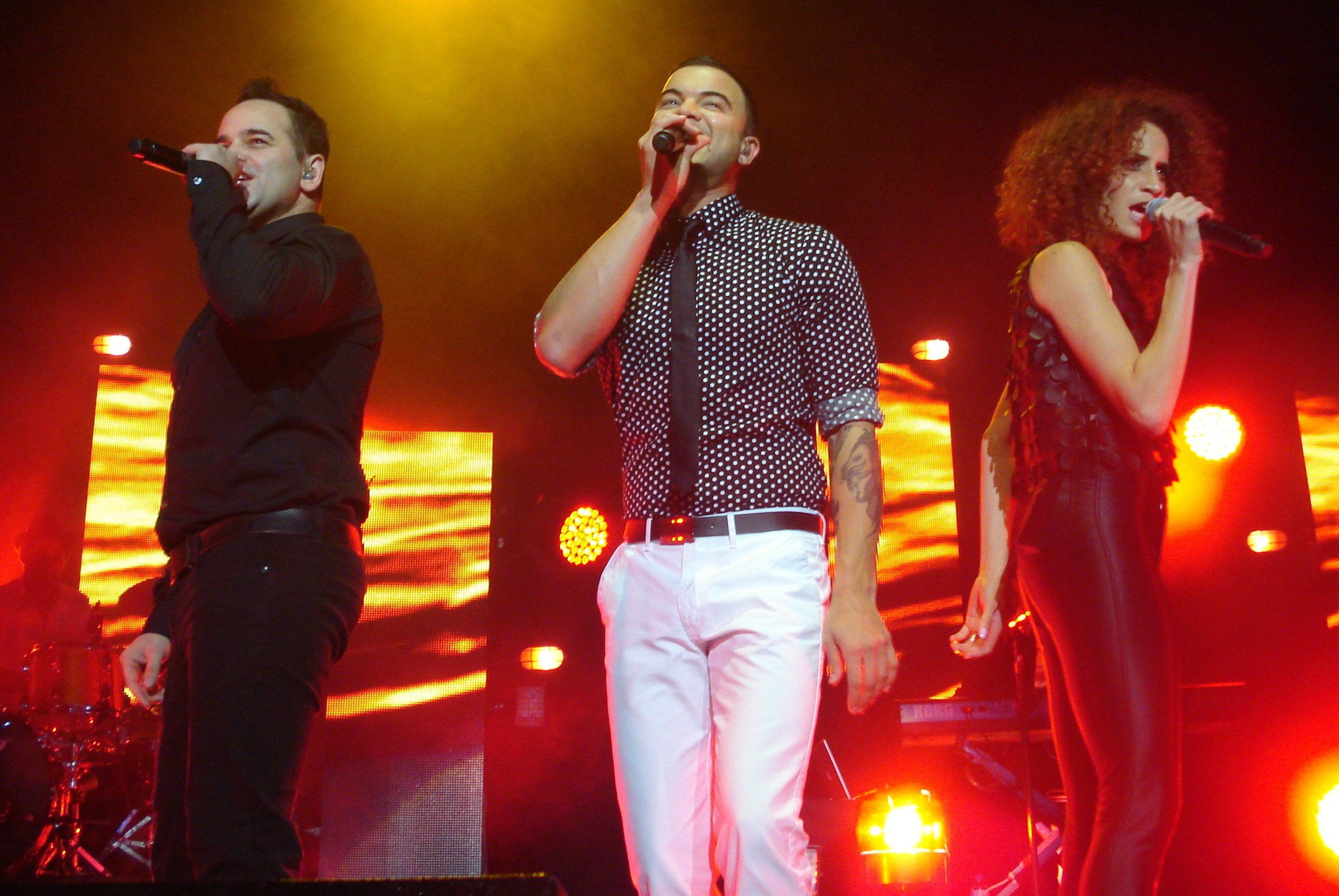
Sebastian, Carmen Smith and Gary Pinto performing on the Armaggedon Tour.

Sebastian toured nationally during June and July 2012. The 20 date tour had concerts in all capital cities and also in regional areas of New South Wales, Victoria and Queensland. Originally scheduled to promote the album after its release, the tour became a showcase for the new songs. An extra concert at the Palais Theatre, Victoria was added to film footage for the deluxe edition of the album. Sebastian performed songs from previous albums as well as new songs. He felt it was the best tour he had done, saying "I pretty much put every cent back into the tour and really stepped up the production and the lighting, it's a lot bigger and better. I'm playing some 3000-seat venues and a bunch of them are sold out, so I want to make sure I'm not compromising. I didn't want to fall short, and it has come up great, better than I thought."

Sebastian invited Ben Burgess, a musician friend from the US, to tour with him. He performed Fiasco's rap on "Battle Scars" and was also the support act. Due to Carmen Smith's disqualification from The Voice she was able to participate on the tour. She performed backing vocals along with Gary Pinto, and also the featured parts for "Art of Love" and "Who's That Girl". Smith also performed "Armageddon" with Sebastian, as at the time he had been thinking of having a featured artist on the track. There was speculation in the media that Channel Nine's The Voice had issues with Sebastian, when The Voice contestants including his own brother Chris were barred from attending one of the concerts. Sebastian is a judge and mentor on The X Factor which is aired on the Seven Network. Channel Nine blamed it on scheduling and security problems, while the show's producers declined to comment.

==== Get Along tour ====
In November 2012 a five date tour of the mainland capital cities was announced for March/April 2013. The concerts in Melbourne, Sydney, Perth and Adelaide sold out in the first week, and extra concerts were added in those cities. The tour was extended to include 37 concerts in regional areas of Australia in May and June 2013. David Ryan Harris, an American soul musician who has co-written songs with Sebastian including "Like it Like That" and "Battle Scars", was the support act. He also played guitar in Sebastian's band on the tour. Carmen Smith, and former X-Factor contestant Angel Tupai were the backing vocalists, and both performed duets with Sebastian.

== Critical reception ==
Armageddon and its singles have received a number of positive reviews. Jamie Horne, music journalist for the Border Mail gave the album four and a half out of five stars, saying, "Armageddon truly is mature pop. But do not fear — it's not adult contemporary and, more importantly, it's nothing like the club pop that's been diseasing our charts. It is late, however, having been penciled in for a mid-year release. But that's also forgiven early with the opening duo, Amnesia and Beg, the latter a swirling mid-tempo effort destined to be a live favourite." Cameron Adams from the Herald Sun wrote, "You've heard Guy's best single to date in Battle Scars; now welcome to his best album. His songwriting has matured as he's left the club behind to focus on the real world. Amnesia and Beg are classy, dramatic adult pop songs that showcase his voice." Adams said "Get Along" was "inspired", and showed new depth from Sebastian. Take 40, said, "Brilliant work Guy! We know this is going to be a success, and will hopefully give you some ARIA nods this time next year." They called the title track "Armageddon" an "uplifting anthem", and said "Get Along" showed "the beautiful timbre of his voice, and has a very inspiring message". Jessica Tisdell from music site Novastreamusic wrote, "Sebastian's latest album Armageddon (2012) demonstrates the great growth as an artist that he has achieved over the years of dedication to his career. [...] Armageddon is one of those albums that you just listen to easily and does not have one bad track." She said the lyrics of "Get Along" were "heart-warming and send a great message to humanity" and that "Amnesia" demonstrated "Sebastian's amazing vocal range".

David Lim, a music journalist and announcer on radio station Joy 94.9, wrote in an article about the best albums of 2012, "When it comes to the quality of songwriting and vocal performance, this is hands down the best Guy Sebastian album yet. [...] Armageddon feels like a mature, universal pop album that would appeal to young and old, broken and fulfilled alike." In earlier reviews for the singles he said "Don't Worry Be Happy" was "feel good, sun-soaked and universally appealing", and described Battle Scars as a "massive bruised ballad with a titan hook that just beats you down with no mercy." Lim wrote of "Get Along", "The emotive political ballad 'Get Along' is possibly the best single Sebastian has ever released. I just can't get over how great his observant lyrics about religious wars are. The hook - 'Dear God, dear soul, dear Mary, Mohammed... can we all just get along?' - absolutely rips right through the heart. Music site auspOp gave positive reviews for all the released singles. They said "Don't Worry Be Happy" was "bright as sunshine" and of "Gold" they wrote, "This new tune is precisely what Guy does best - oozing with class and old school soul. 'Gold' sounds like it could have been ripped straight from the streets of 1960s Detroit, what with its flashy brass, gorgeous gospel chorus and Guy's insane pitch-perfect vocal. They named "Battle Scars" as one of the best singles of the year, with "stunning, crystal-clear, pitch-perfect vocals" calling it "superb home-grown pop". In a review for "Get Along" they wrote, "This one is designed to get you thinking. To tap into your emotions. 'Get Along' is a song about hope, peace and understanding and a dream that perhaps one day we'll all be united, together as one people, one world, despite our differences in opinion, religion, creed and race. [...] Good on Guy for shining some light and spreading the love."

"Battle Scars" received positive response from overseas, including mentions in reviews for Fiasco's album. Hip hop indie/pop site Hillydilly called it "epic", writing, "Evidently this guy can sing because he sure does let it be known on 'Battle Scars'. There is also a perfect amount of Lupe on this track—he is not tucked away on some last verse ****, rather he is found throughout the song." David Fredrick from music discovery site Gigity wrote, "it is an instant classic that will surely grab your attention." HipHop DX said it "oozed mass appeal without deteriorating into sloshy mainstream". Colin McQuire from Pop Matters wrote that the "piano-laden groove adds the texture it needs to be a bona fide Top 40 hit, and Fiasco's crisp broken-hearted rhymes illustrate the exact type of accessibility the track needs to gain commercial notoriety." A reviewer for entertainment site Pop Culture Podcast said, "This one has chart topping single written all over it but due to its genuine lyrics and universal subject matter it doesn't feel like one that you have to 'sell out' to make."

=== Accolades ===
"Don't Worry Be Happy" was nominated for Song of 2011 and Sebastian won the Australian Male Artist Award in the 2011 POPreplublic.tv. IT List Awards. The nominees are chosen by POPreplublic, with public vote deciding the winner. The song was also shortlisted for the 2012 APRA Song of the Year Award, which is voted for by the songwriting members of APRA. Sebastian was awarded the 2012 Australian GQ Solo Artist of the Year Award. He was nominated for three 2012 ARIA Music Awards. He received nominations for Best Pop release and Best Male Artist for "Battle Scars" in the industry judged categories. "Don't Worry Be Happy" was nominated for the new Song of the Year Award, where the nominees were the highest selling singles of the year, and the public decided the winner. "Armageddon" was named in the top 20 albums of 2012 by music site The Music Network, one of only six Australian albums included in their list.

"Battle Scars" won Song of 2012 in the 2012 POPreplublic.tv. IT List Awards. Sebastian also received nominations for Album of 2012 for "Armageddon" and Australian Male Artist. "Battle Scars" has also received recognition internationally. It was nominated for an NAACP Image Award for Outstanding Duo, Group or Collaboration. The Awards are presented by the American National Association for the Advancement of Colored People. It also won the R&B/Hip category in the 2013 International Songwriting Competition. The judging panel is made up of musicians, songwriters and industry experts, and songs are judged on creativity, originality, lyrics, melody, arrangement and overall likeability. "Get Along" was a finalist in the Pop/Top 40 category, and received an honourable mention. "Get Along" was a final five nominee for the 2013 APRA Song of the Year Award, and "Don't Worry Be Happy" was nominated for Pop Work of the Year and Most Played Australian Work. Sebastian won Best Pop Release for Armageddon and Best Live Act for the Get Along Tour at the 2013 ARIA Awards. He was also nominated for Album of the Year and Best Male Artist for Armageddon, and Song of the Year for "Get Along".

== Commercial performance ==
Armageddon debuted at number two on the ARIA Album Chart, rising to number one in its seventh week, and was certified 3× platinum in 2023. It was Sebastian's seventh album to peak in the top six, and his second to reach number one. After only 12 weeks of sales the album was the ninth highest selling album in Australia in 2012, the second highest selling album by an Australian act. The album went on to spend 31 weeks in the ARIA top 50, including 14 weeks in the top ten and again appeared in the End of Year Chart in 2013, charting at number 46. Armageddon also reached number 20 and platinum certification in New Zealand, and was Sebastian's fourth top 30 album there.

== Track listing ==
| No. | Title | Writer(s) | Producer(s) | Length |
|---|---|---|---|---|
| 1. | "Amnesia" | Guy Sebastian, Erika Nuri | Pro-Jay | 3:13 |
| 2. | "Beg" | Sebastian, Tim Deal | Tim Deal | 4:43 |
| 3. | "Battle Scars" (featuring Lupe Fiasco) | Sebastian, David Ryan Harris, Wasalu Jaco | Pro-Jay | 4:10 |
| 4. | "Gold" | Sebastian, Harmony "H-Money" Samuels | Pro-Jay, Samuels | 3:24 |
| 5. | "Get Along" | Sebastian, Ian Barter | Ian Barter | 4:22 |
| 6. | "Keeper" | Sebastian | Louis Schoorl | 3:55 |
| 7. | "Don't Worry Be Happy" | Sebastian | Schoorl, DNA, Sebastian | 4:29 |
| 8. | "Armageddon" | Sebastian | Pro-Jay | 3:29 |
| 9. | "Big Bad World" | Sebastian | Schoorl | 4:28 |
| 10. | "Summer Love" | Sebastian, Hasham "Sham" Hussain, Denarius "Motesart" Motes, Stacy Barthe, Luke James | Sham & Motesart | 3:47 |
| 11. | "Died and Gone to Heaven" | Sebastian, Barter | Barter | 4:39 |
| 12. | "Used to You" | Sebastian | Sebastian | 3:17 |
| Total length: | | | | 47:56 |

Digital download bonus tracks
| No. | Title | Writer(s) | Producer(s) | Length |
|---|---|---|---|---|
| 13. | "Keeper" (Live in Concert) | Sebastian | Lachlan Monsted | 3:57 |
| 14. | "Out with My Baby" (Live in Concert) | Sebastian, Robin Thicke, James Gass | Monsted | 4:14 |
| Total length: | | | | 56:07 |

Deluxe edition DVD - Guy Sebastian Live - The Armageddon Tour
| No. | Title | Writer(s) | Length |
|---|---|---|---|
| 1. | "Like It Like That (Solo)" | Guy Sebastian, David Ryan Harris, Sean Hurley |
| 2. | "Out with My Baby" | Sebastian, Robin Thicke, James Gass |
| 3. | "Don't Worry Be Happy" | Sebastian |
| 4. | "Keeper" | Sebastian |
| 5. | "Big Bad World" | Sebastian |
| 6. | "Battle Scars" | Sebastian, Ryan Harris, Wasalu Jaco |
| 7. | "Armageddon" | Sebastian |
| 8. | "Get Along" | Sebastian, Ian Barter |
| 9. | "Died and Gone to Heaven" | Sebastian, Barter |
| 10. | "Who's That Girl" | Sebastian, Eve Jihan Jeffers |
| 11. | "Gold" | Sebastian, Harmony "H-Money" Samuels |
| 12. | "Like It Like That" | Sebastian, Ryan Harris, Hurley |

Sample credits

- "Gold" features a sample from the Otis Redding recording "Shake". - produced under licence from Atlantic recording Corp.

== Personnel ==
Adapted from the Armagddon liner notes.

=== Standard edition ===
- Stacy Barthe – composer
- Darryl Beaton – piano
- Ian Barter – arrangements, composer, bass guitar, electric guitar, drums, keys, producer
- Jose Cardoza – assistant engineer
- Tim Deal – composer, key and string arrangements, producer, programming
- DNA – producer
- Lupe Fiasco – composer, vocals
- Chris Galland – assistant mixer
- Angus Gomm – trumpet
- Ben Gurton – trombone
- David Ryan Harris – composer
- Andy Hughes – engineer
- Hasham Hussein – composer, engineer, mixing, producer
- Luke James – composer
- James Kang – assistant engineer
- Graham Kearns – guitar
- Carlos King – engineer
- Manny Marroquin – mixing
- Lizzy May – cello
- Denarius Motes – composer, engineer, mixing, producer
- Paul Muggleton – engineer
- Eric Nuri – composer
- Mathew Ottignon – saxophone
- Pro-Jay – producer, drum programming
- Mathew Racher – drums
- Harmony "H-Money" Samuels – composer, producer
- Louis Schoorl – bass, keys, guitar, drums, engineer, producer, programming
- Guy Sebastian – acoustic guitar, composer, producer, vocals
- David Shober – engineer
- Carmen Smith – backing vocals
- Matt Tait – engineer
- Calvin Turner – string arranging and conducting
- Samuel Vincent – acoustic, electric and bass guitar
- Miles Walker – mixing
- Leon Zervos – mastering

=== Deluxe edition DVD ===
Recorded at The Palais Theatre, Melbourne

On stage

- Guy Sebastian – lead vocals
- Carmen Smith – backing vocals, performed Eve's rap in "Who's That Girl"
- Gary Pinto – backing vocals
- Ben Burgess – performed Fiasco's rap in "Battle Scars"
- Terepai Richmond – drums
- Adam Ventoura – bass
- Darryl Beaton – keys
- Sam Vincent – guitar

Other personnel

- Rachel Aracan – DVD authoring
- Steven Arriagada – Steadicam operator
- AV1 Media & Livevision Productions – technical production
- Michael Bates – Steadicam assistant
- Wes Buchanan – DVD crew director, technical director, camera operator
- Paul Bosio – camera operator
- Ian Chadwick – monitor engineer
- Anatole Day – front of house engineer, production manager, audio recording engineer, DVD recording engineer, DVD mix engineer
- Titus Day – management
- Zoltan Deak – technical assistant
- David Fairweather – visual content animator, DVD editor
- Michael Flannery – audio
- Darlene Grech – DVD design
- Lachlan Monsted – DVD production
- Jed Von Hesse – vision, lighting
- Craig Housham – vision
- Simon "Junior" Johnson – lighting director
- Brendon Malone – lighting
- Aaron Marshal – DVD crew director, technical director
- Brett Millican – backline
- Power Productions – production crew and production supplier
- Bruce Ramus – show design and direction, creative director
- Dan Redgrave – Guy Sebastian crew manager, tour manager
- Paul Stefanidis – DVD mastering
- Joe Tolliday – visual content animator, DVD editor
- Emma Valente – visual content animator
- Sam Vincent – DVD mix engineer
- Josh Woodroffe – camera operator

== Charts and certifications ==
=== Weekly charts ===
| Chart (2012) | Peak position |
|---|---|
| Australian Albums (ARIA) | 1 |
| New Zealand Albums (RMNZ) | 20 |

=== Year-end charts ===
| Chart (2012) | Position |
|---|---|
| Australian Albums Chart | 9 |
| Australian Artist Albums Chart | 2 |
| Chart (2013) | Position |
| Australian Albums Chart | 46 |
| Australian Artist Albums Chart | 18 |

=== Decade-end charts ===
| Chart (2010–2019) | Position |
|---|---|
| Australian Albums (ARIA) | 51 |
| Australian Artist Albums (ARIA) | 7 |

=== Certifications ===
| Country | Certification |
|---|---|
| Australia | 3× Platinum |
| New Zealand | Platinum |

== Release history ==
| Country | Date | Format | Label |
|---|---|---|---|
| Australia | 12 October 2012 | CD, digital download | Sony Music Australia |
