= Used to You =

Used to You may refer to:

- "Used to You", a 2012 song by Guy Sebastian from Armageddon
- "Used to You", a 2018 song by Dagny
