= Carmen Smith =

Carmen Smith may refer to:

- Carmen Smith-Brown (born 1943), Jamaican sprinter
- Carmen Giménez Smith (born 1971), American poet
- Carmen Smith (singer) (born 1984), Australian singer-songwriter
- Carmen Smith, Baroness Smith of Llanfaes (born 1996), Welsh politician
