= Gold (Guy Sebastian song) =

Single by Guy Sebastian

from the album Armageddon
- Released: 11 May 2012
- Genre: Pop, soul
- Length: 3:22
- Label: Sony Music Entertainment
- Songwriters: Guy Sebastian, Harmony "H-Money" Samuels
- Producers: Pro-Jay, Harmony "H-Money" Samuels

Guy Sebastian singles chronology
"Don't Worry Be Happy" (2011)	"Gold" (2012)	"Battle Scars" (2012)

Music video
- "Gold" on YouTube

"Gold" is a song written and performed by Australian singer-songwriter Guy Sebastian. It is the second single from his seventh album Armageddon and was released digitally in Australia on 11 May 2012. An EP with two new songs and a remix of a previous single "Who's That Girl" was released in CD format on 1 June 2012 and digitally on 15 June 2012. "Gold" peaked at number ten on the ARIA Singles Chart and was certified platinum in 2014. It was Sebastian's ninth of 12 top ten singles on the Australian charts.

== Background ==
"Gold" is an uptempo soul song. During an interview on Australian radio station Nova 96.9 Sebastian said "Gold" was special to him because he was a huge Otis Redding fan, and he had inserted a horn line from a 1967 live recording of an Otis Redding track called "Shake" into the song. Discussing the inspiration for the song, he said: "You hear an old soul track, old Motown or Memphis, and it just makes you get on your feet." He elaborated, "It's probably the most fun, up-tempo song I've ever released to sing [...] Because it's such aggressive soul... By the end of the track I'm jumping out of my skin. It's one of those singer songs." Sebastian said in an interview with Take 40 that the idea for lyrics came because of a friend who always used the term "That's Gold".

There was some controversy surrounding the song when The Voice final 24 contestant Carmen Smith, who performed backing vocals on the track, was asked to leave the show because she appeared in the video. The Voice producers said she had broken the "spirit" of the rules as the video would give her an unfair advantage over other contestants. Smith later stated that she had performed with Sebastian for years, and had a clause in her The Voice contract which allowed her to continue to perform and record with him. She thought appearing in the video would be permitted under her contract, but that The Voice producers saw things differently: "We had differences in opinion but in the end that is how they felt about it and I just had to go home and accept it. [...] The fact that this has happened, it is unfortunate, but the positive is that I get to move on and do what I do best and sing with Guy again."

== Release and promotion ==
"Gold" was serviced to radio on 4 May 2012 and was the second most added song to Australian radio for two consecutive weeks. It peaked at number 26 on the national airplay charts. Sebastian performed the song on the Seven Network's Dancing with the Stars, Australia's Got Talent and Sunrise.

== Reception ==
=== Critical response ===
A reviewer for Take 40 wrote: "It's already becoming one of our favourite new tunes! The song is super-fast and full of fun vibes and has an upbeat Motown feel to it!" Power Fm announcer Bella Frizza said: "'GOLD' has just been released and you know what? I reckon it is just that -GOLDEN! But hey don't trust my ears – listen for yourself and if you're not dancing round your office/bedroom/loungeroom within about 40 seconds then I want to hear why!" Music site auspOp wrote: "We can't tell you how happy we are that Guy Sebastian has ditched the R&B/dance hybrid sound for his latest single 'Gold'. 'Cause this new tune is precisely what Guy does best – oozing with class and old school soul. 'Gold' sounds like it could have been ripped straight from the streets of '60s Detroit, what with its flashy brass, gorgeous gospel chorus and Guy's insane pitch-perfect vocal. [...] 'Gold' is quite simply pure, unadulterated joy."

=== Commercial performance ===
"Gold" debuted and peaked at number ten on the ARIA Singles Chart, and achieved platinum certification in 2014. It was Sebastian's ninth of 12 top ten singles in Australia.

== Music video ==
The accompanying music video for "Gold" premiered in May 2012. It was filmed at an old warehouse at the Mill Markets in Geelong, Victoria. Sebastian said the concept came from an old Billy Preston video. He sent it to the producers as a reference and the "Gold" video evolved from there. It is set at a 1950s warehouse party, and Sebastian and his band are shown performing to an audience dressed in clothing of the era. He and his backing vocalist leave the stage and join the dancers on the dance floor. The video is shot in black and white, and in the last 45 seconds is infused with gold highlights and then progresses to full subdued colour.

== Charts ==
=== Weekly charts ===
Chart (2012)	Peak position
Australia (ARIA)	10

=== Year-end charts ===
Chart (2012)	Position
Australian Artist (ARIA)	37

== Certifications ==
Region	Certification	Certified units/sales
Australia (ARIA)	Platinum	70,000^{^}
^{^} Shipments figures based on certification alone.

== Track listing ==
- Digital single
1. "Gold" – 3:22
- Extended play CD and digital download
1. "Gold" – 3:24
2. "Diamond in My Hand" – 3:24
3. "Lost in the Streets of LA" – 3:32
4. "Who's That Girl" (7th Heaven Radio Mix) – 3:59

== Credits and personnel ==
- Lead vocals (all tracks) – Guy Sebastian

"Gold"

- Writers – Guy Sebastian, Harmony "H-Money" Samuels
- Background vocals – Carmen Smith
- Featured sample – Otis Redding recording "Shake"
- Production – Pro-Jay, Samuels
- Engineering – Carlos King
- Assistant engineer – Jose Cardoza
- Mixing – Manny Marroquin
- Mixing assistant – Chris Galland
- Mastering – Joe Laporta

"Diamond in My Hand"

- Writers – Guy Sebastian, Pro-Jay
- Production – Pro-Jay
- Mixing – Rob Chiarelli
- Mastering – Leon Zervos

"Lost in the Streets of LA"

- Writers – Guy Sebastian, Andre Harris, Carl Dimatago
- Production – Andre Harris
- Mastering – Leon Zervos

"Who's That Girl"

- Writers – Guy Sebastian, Eve
- Featured rap – Eve
- Production – Guy Sebastian, Andre Harris
- Engineering and mixing – Brandon Kilgour
- Mastering – Leon Zervos
- Remix – 7th Heaven

Credits taken from "Gold" CD liner notes.

== Release history ==
Country	Format	Date	Label
Australia	Digital download	11 May 2012	Sony Music Australia
Australia	CD single	1 June 2012	Sony Music Australia
