= List of top 10 singles for 2011 in Australia =

This is a list of singles that charted in the top ten of the ARIA Charts in 2011.

== Top-ten singles ==
Key

Symbol	Meaning
◁	Indicates single's top 10 entry was also its ARIA top 50 debut
(#)	2011 Year-end top 10 single position and rank

List of ARIA top ten singles that peaked in 2011
Top ten entry date	Single	Artist(s)	Peak	Peak date	Weeks in top ten	References
Singles from 2010
27 December	"Who's That Chick?"	David Guetta featuring Rihanna	7	17 January	8	
Singles from 2011
10 January	"Dirty Talk"	Wynter Gordon	1	17 January	9	
10 January	"Tonight (I'm Lovin' You)" ◁	Enrique Iglesias featuring Ludacris and DJ Frank E	2	17 January	7	
17 January	"Hold It Against Me" ◁	Britney Spears	4	24 January	3	
17 January	"Happiness"	Alexis Jordan	3	24 January	9	
24 January	"I Just Had Sex"	The Lonely Island featuring Akon	10	24 January	1	
24 January	"What the Hell" ◁	Avril Lavigne	6	21 February	7	
31 January	"E.T."	Katy Perry featuring Kanye West	5	31 January	5	
31 January	"S&M"	Rihanna	1	7 February	12	
14 February	"More"	Usher	7	14 February	4	
14 February	"Just Can't Get Enough"	The Black Eyed Peas	3	14 February	12	
21 February	"Born This Way" (#8) ◁	Lady Gaga	1	21 February	8	
28 February	"On the Floor" (#10) ◁	Jennifer Lopez featuring Pitbull	1	21 March	13	
28 February	"Coming Home"	Diddy – Dirty Money featuring Skylar Grey	4	28 February	8	
7 March	"The Lazy Song"	Bruno Mars	6	2 May	11	
14 March	"The Show Goes On"	Lupe Fiasco	5	21 March	6	
14 March	"Price Tag" (#9)	Jessie J featuring B.o.B.	2	21 March	12	
21 March	"Blow"	Kesha	10	21 March	1	
21 March	"Sweat" ◁	Snoop Dogg and David Guetta	1	11 April	11	
28 March	"Beautiful People"	Chris Brown featuring Benny Benassi	7	2 May	7	
11 April	"Party Rock Anthem" (#1)	LMFAO featuring Lauren Bennett and GoonRock	1	18 April	20	
18 April	"Give Me Everything" (#7)	Pitbull featuring Ne-Yo, Afrojack and Nayer	2	16 May	15	
25 April	"Till the World Ends"	Britney Spears	8	25 April	3	
25 April	"Judas" ◁	Lady Gaga	6	25 April	1	
2 May	"Who Dat Girl"	Flo Rida featuring Akon	10	2 May	1	
9 May	"Rolling in the Deep" (#5)	Adele	3	23 May	19	
9 May	"We Run the Night" ◁	Havana Brown	5	6 June	9	
16 May	"Own This Club"	Marvin Priest	6	23 May	9	
16 May	"Where Them Girls At"	David Guetta featuring Flo Rida and Nicki Minaj	6	16 May	3	
23 May	"California King Bed"	Rihanna	4	30 May	4	
6 June	"Run the World (Girls)"	Beyoncé	10	6 June	1	
6 June	"Nobody's Perfect"	Jessie J	9	6 June	2	
6 June	"Jet Lag"	Simple Plan featuring Natasha Bedingfield	8	6 June	2	
6 June	"Don't Wanna Go Home"	Jason Derulo	5	13 June	9	
13 June	"Last Friday Night (T.G.I.F.)"	Katy Perry	5	27 June	7	
13 June	"Someone like You" (#4)	Adele	1	27 June	15	
20 June	"Loud"	Stan Walker	9	20 June	2	
27 June	"Jar of Hearts"	Christina Perri	2	18 July	8	
4 July	"Marry You"	Bruno Mars	8	11 July	5	
18 July	"Moves like Jagger" (#3)	Maroon 5 featuring Christina Aguilera	2	1 August	19	
18 July	"The Edge of Glory"	Lady Gaga	2	25 July	4	
1 August	"Super Bass"	Nicki Minaj	6	15 August	6	
1 August	"Somebody That I Used to Know" (#2)	Gotye featuring Kimbra	1	15 August	16	
8 August	"Inescapable"	Jessica Mauboy	4	15 August	5	
8 August	"Right There"	Nicole Scherzinger featuring 50 Cent	8	8 August	3	
15 August	"Champagne Showers"	LMFAO featuring Natalia Kills	9	22 August	2	
22 August	"Titanium"	David Guetta featuring Sia	5	5 September	13	
29 August	"Rain Over Me"	Pitbull featuring Marc Anthony	9	29 August	2	
29 August	"Bounce"	Calvin Harris featuring Kelis	7	5 September	3	
29 August	"It Girl"	Jason Derulo	3	29 August	9	
5 September	"Cheers (Drink to That)"	Rihanna	6	19 September	6	
12 September	"Without You"	David Guetta featuring Usher	6	14 November	5	
12 September	"You Make Me Feel…"	Cobra Starship featuring Sabi	3	26 September	7	
19 September	"Domino"	Jessie J	5	19 September	3	
26 September	"Stereo Hearts"	Gym Class Heroes featuring Adam Levine	4	3 October	8	
26 September	"Tonight Tonight"	Hot Chelle Rae	7	26 September	3	
3 October	"We Found Love" ◁	Rihanna featuring Calvin Harris	2	17 October	12	
10 October	"Sexy and I Know It" (#6)	LMFAO	1	17 October	15	
10 October	"Mr. Know It All"	Kelly Clarkson	1	10 October	5	
17 October	"Good Feeling"	Flo Rida	4	7 November	14	
7 November	"Feel So Close"	Calvin Harris	7	14 November	3	
14 November	"The A Team"	Ed Sheeran	2	21 November	8	
21 November	"Dedication to My Ex (Miss That)"	Lloyd featuring André 3000 and Lil Wayne	6	19 December	7	
28 November	"Good Night" ◁	Reece Mastin	1	28 November	8	
12 December	"Breathing"	Jason Derulo	9	12 December	3	

=== 2010 peaks ===
List of ARIA top ten singles in 2011 that peaked in 2010
Top ten entry date	Single	Artist(s)	Peak	Peak date	Weeks in top ten	References
18 October	"Raise Your Glass" ◁	Pink	1	18 October	12	
1 November	"Like a G6"	Far East Movement featuring The Cataracs and Dev	2	15 November	10	
8 November	"Firework"	Katy Perry	3	29 November	11	
8 November	"We R Who We R" ◁	Kesha	1	8 November	10	
15 November	"The Time (Dirty Bit)" ◁	The Black Eyed Peas	1	22 November	10	
29 November	"Yeah 3x" ◁	Chris Brown	4	27 December	13	
6 December	"Grenade"	Bruno Mars	1	13 December	10	
6 December	"Who's That Girl"	Guy Sebastian featuring Eve	1	27 December	10	
20 December	"Saturday Night"	Jessica Mauboy featuring Ludacris	7	27 December	4	

=== 2012 peaks ===
List of ARIA top ten singles in 2011 that peaked in 2012
Top ten entry date	Single	Artist(s)	Peak	Peak date	Weeks in top ten	References
31 October	"Pumped Up Kicks"	Foster the People	1	16 January	8	
21 November	"What Makes You Beautiful"	One Direction	7	2 January	9	
28 November	"Young, Wild & Free"	Snoop Dogg and Wiz Khalifa featuring Bruno Mars	4	2 January	7	
28 November	"Hangover"	Taio Cruz featuring Flo Rida	3	2 January	7	
28 November	"Don't Worry Be Happy" ◁	Guy Sebastian	5	2 January	10	
5 December	"Paradise"	Coldplay	3	9 January	13	

== Entries by artist ==
The following table shows artists who achieved two or more top 10 entries in 2011, including songs that reached their peak in 2010 and 2012. The figures include both main artists and featured artists. The total number of weeks an artist spent in the top ten in 2011 is also shown.

Entries	Artist	Weeks	Songs
5	David Guetta	32	"Sweat", "Titanium", "Where Them Girls At", "Who's That Chick?", "Without You"
5	Rihanna	35	"California King Bed", "Cheers", "S&M", "Who's That Chick?", "We Found Love"
4	Bruno Mars	24	"Grenade", "Marry You", "The Lazy Song", "Young, Wild & Free"
4	Flo Rida	15	"Good Feeling", "Hangover", "Where Them Girls At", "Who Dat Girl"
3	Calvin Harris	15	"Bounce", "Feel So Close", "We Found Love"
3	Jason Derulo	20	"Breathing", "Don't Wanna Go Home", "It Girl"
3	Jessie J	17	"Domino", "Nobody's Perfect", "Price Tag"
3	Katy Perry	15	"E.T.", "Firework", "Last Friday Night (T.G.I.F.)"
3	Lady Gaga	13	"Born This Way", "Judas", "The Edge of Glory"
3	LMFAO	34	"Champagne Showers", "Party Rock Anthem", "Sexy and I Know It"
3	Pitbull	24	"Give Me Everything", "On the Floor", "Rain Over Me"
2	Adam Levine (includes songs as part of Maroon 5)	19	"Moves like Jagger", "Stereo Hearts"
2	Adele	19	"Rolling in the Deep", "Someone like You"
2	Akon	2	"I Just Had Sex", "Who Dat Girl"
2	The Black Eyed Peas	15	"Just Can't Get Enough", "The Time (Dirty Bit)"
2	Britney Spears	6	"Hold It Against Me", "Till the World Ends"
2	Chris Brown	15	"Beautiful People", "Yeah 3x"
2	Guy Sebastian	11	"Don't Worry Be Happy", "Who's That Girl"
2	Jessica Mauboy	7	"Inescapable", "Saturday Night"
2	Kesha	3	"Blow", "We R Who We R"
2	Ludacris	9	"Saturday Night", "Tonight (I'm Lovin' You)"
2	Nicki Minaj	9	"Super Bass", "Where Them Girls At"
2	Snoop Dogg	13	"Sweat", "Young, Wild & Free"
2	Usher	9	"More", "Without You"

== See also ==
- 2011 in music
- ARIA Charts
- List of number-one singles of 2011 (Australia)
- List of top 25 singles for 2011 in Australia
