= Carmen Smith (singer) =

Australian singer-songwriter (born 1950)

Eleonora del Carmen Maria de los Angeles Rafaela Hernandez Smith
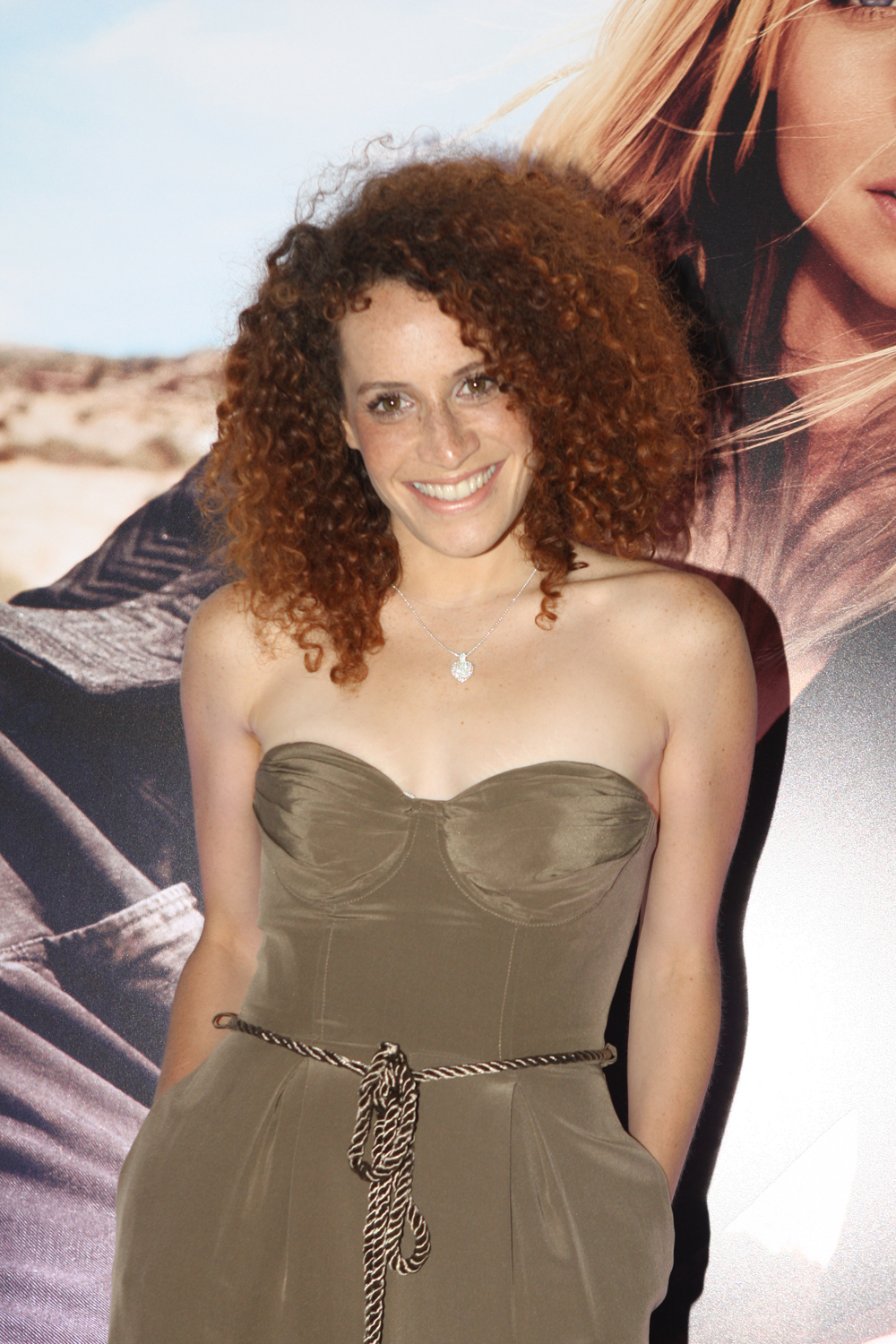

Background information
- Born: Eleonora del Carmen Maria de los Angeles Rafaela Hernandez Smith
- Origin: Sydney
- Genre: Pop
- Occupation: Singer
- Instrument: Vocals
- Years active: 2002–present

Carmen Smith (born 1984) is an Australian singer-songwriter who rose to prominence after appearing in the first season of The Voice Australia.

== Early career ==
Since 2002, Smith has been a back-up singer for a number of Australian performers, including Guy Sebastian. She has released two of her own solo albums as well as written songs for singers Stan Walker and Jessica Mauboy.

In 2005, Carmen wrote "All I Ask" as the winner's single of New Zealand Idol, which was released by Rosita Vai. In 2010, Carmen was featured on "Mousetrap Heart" by Thirsty Merc.

== 2012–present: The Voice Australia and disqualification ==
In 2012, Smith appeared on the premiere episode of The Voice Australia's first season. She joined coach Joel Madden's team after singing the Alicia Keys song "How Come You Don't Call Me". For her Battle Round, she sang the song "We Found Love" by Rihanna with Michelle Serret-Cursio whom she won against. However, after her vocals appeared in Guy Sebastian's song "Gold", she was disqualified from the show by the show's producers after she appeared in the song's music video. The Voice producers said she had broken the "spirit" of the rules as the video would give her an unfair advantage over other contestants. Smith later stated that she had performed with Sebastian for years, and had a clause in her The Voice contract which allowed her to continue to perform and record with him. This is the first disqualification of a contestant in the history of the show's format.

After her disqualification from the show, Smith appeared alongside Sebastian singing a duet on rival show, Australia's Got Talent.

She then went on to join Sebastian on his Armageddon Tour, where she performed "Gold", and other features in his songs. The tour ran nationally throughout June and July 2012 to coincide with the release of his highly anticipated seventh album Armageddon. In 2013, Smith again toured with Sebastian featuring on songs as well as providing back vocals on this 46 date tour called the Get Along Tour.

Smith would later join Sebastian as a backup singer for the song "Tonight Again" as part of the 2015 edition of the Eurovision Song Contest. The song finished in fifth place with 196 points.

Smith appears as a vocal coach on the 2023 season of Australian Idol.

== Discography ==
=== Studio Albums and EPs ===
- Carmen Smith (2007)
- Ever Known (2011)
- They Don't Know Me (2012)

=== Special Releases ===
- Polaroid (2012)

=== Singles ===
- How Come You Don't Call Me (The Voice Performance) (2012)
- We Found Love (The Voice Performance) (2012)
- They Don't Know Me (2012)
- Breaker of Hearts (2013)
- Love's on the Run (2013)
