= GQ Australia =

Australian men's lifestyle magazine

- Front Cover with Australian actor Hugh Jackman
- Editor: Jake Millar
- Digital Editor: Nikolina Ilic
- Edwina McCann: Editorial Director
- Nicholas Gray: Publisher
- Categories: Men's
- Frequency: 8 issues per annum
- Circulation: 150,000
- First issue: September 1998
- Company: NewsLifeMedia (News Corp Australia)
- Country: Australia
- Based in: Sydney
- Language: English
- Website: www.gq.com.au

GQ Australia is an Australian lifestyle publication and the Australian version of men's magazine GQ.

Published by NewsLifeMedia, a division of News Corp Australia, the print and digital men's title offers advice, news and features across style, grooming, watches, luxury, cars, politics and fitness. GQ Australia first began as a printed publication in 1998 and now spans across stand-alone issues, mobile apps, social media platforms and the website GQ.com.au. With 8 issues printed every year, GQ also hosts events, the flagship of which is the GQ Men of the Year Awards. GQ has interviewed many of the country's leading musicians, and Hollywood stars. Former cover stars include Hugh Jackman, Guy Pearce, George Clooney, Leonardo DiCaprio, Brad Pitt, Chris Pratt, Jake Gyllenhaal, Matt Damon, Liam Hemsworth, James Franco, Kit Harington and many more

GQ has interviewed many leading Australian political figures including prime ministers Kevin Rudd and Malcolm Turnbull, Foreign Minister Julie Bishop and Opposition Leader Bill Shorten alongside many state and federal MPs. In the case of Malcolm Turnbull, he appeared on the cover of GQ in 2015 beneath the headline "Primed Minister"

== GQ Men of the Year ==
GQ's global forum for celebrating men and woman started in 2000 in Australia. With multiple award categories each year: acting, music, business, culinary and creative talent. A full list of previous winners includes

Previous Winners
2017 GQ Men of the Year Winners

Jeff Goldblum, Amber Heard, Travis Fimmel, Flume, Adam Briggs, Jon Kortajarena, Alan Joyce, KJ Apa, Ansel Elgort, A$AP Rocky, Virgil Abloh, Client Liaison, Jeff Horn, Hello Sunday Morning, Hayden Cox and Luke Davis

2016 GQ Men of the Year Winners

Chris Hemsworth, Iggy Azalea, Joel Edgerton, Jon Hamm, Peter Greste, western Bulldogs, Kim Jones, Hacksaw Ridge, Kyle Chalmers, Darren Hart, Dylan Alcott, Joel Creasey, Stan Grant, Ken Done, Atlassian, Richard Roxburgh, Justin O’Shea and Keniyan Lonsdale

2015 GQ Men of the Year Winners

Cody Simpson, David Gandy, Ruby Rose, David Pocock, Jai Courtney, Mick Fanning, Jordan Barrett, Michael Clarke, Waleed Aly, Ryan Corr, Joel & Benji Madden, Myuran Sukumaran, Daniel Johns, Guillaume Brahimi, Troye Sivan, Justin Hemmes and Patrick Johnson

2014 GQ Men of the Year Winners

Ian Thorpe, Nick Boshier & Christiaan Van Vuuren, Daniel Ricciardo, Dave Franco, Neale Whitaker, Nick Palumbo, Fitzy & Wippa, Cheynne Tozzi, Don Hany, Nick Kyrgios, SAbour Bradley, Matt Moran, Vincent Fantauzzo, Jason Clarke, Strateas Carlucci, Brenton Thwaites, Clive Palmer, Jordan & Zac Stenmark, Hugh Evans, INXS, Love Your Sister, Animal Logic, The Preatures and Gough Whitlam (posthumous)

== Subscriptions ==
GQ Australia offers readers annual and bi-annual subscriptions the magazine through their magazine distribution arm Mags Online offering subscribers special edition and subscriber-only editions of the magazine.

== Circulation ==
GQ is published in Australia, Brazil, Canada, China, France, Germany, India, Italy, Japan, Latin America, Mexico, Portugal, Romania, Russia, South Africa, South Korea, Spain, Taiwan, Thailand, Turkey, United Kingdom, and the United States.

== Editors and publishers ==
AU. editors

- (2019–present) Jake Millar,
- (2017–2019) Michael Christensen, Editor
- (2015–2019) Jack Phillips, Digital Editor
- (2019–present) Nikolina Ilic, Digital Editor
- (2016–2017) Matthew Drummond, Editor
- (2012–2014) Ceri David, Editor
- (2007–2012) Nick Smith, Editor
- (1998–1999) Peter Holder, Editor

AU. publishers

- (2018–present) Nicholas Gray
- (2012–2018) Nick Smith
- (1998–) Grant Pearce

== Publication details ==
- GQ Australia. Vol. 1, no. 1 (September 1998–) (Also titled Gentlemen's Quarterly Australia) Greenwich, NSW: Condé Nast Publications Inc., 1998–
- Not published between December/January 1999/2000 and Special ed. (2001). Monthly, September 1998–December/January 1999/2000. ISSN 1440-7795
