= Get Along (Guy Sebastian song) =

Single by Guy Sebastian

from the album Armageddon
- Released: 10 November 2012
- Genre: Pop, R&B
- Length: 4:22
- Label: Sony Music Australia
- Songwriters: Guy Sebastian, Ian Barter
- Producer: Ian Barter

Guy Sebastian singles chronology
"Battle Scars" (2012)	"Get Along" (2012)	"Bed of Clouds" (2013)

Music video
- "Get Along" on YouTube

"Get Along" is a song performed by Australian recording artist Guy Sebastian, released in November 2012 as the fourth single from his seventh album Armageddon. It was written by Sebastian and Ian Barter, who also produced the song. "Get Along" reached number 5 on the ARIA Singles Chart, the fourth top ten single released from "Armageddon". It is also Sebastian's 11th top ten single in Australia, and ninth to peak in the top five. "Get Along" has been certified 3× platinum. "Get Along" also reached number nine and gold certification in New Zealand. The song was a finalist in the Pop/Top 40 category of the 2013 International Songwriting Competition, and was also one of the final five nominees for the APRA Song of the Year Award. It was also nominated for Song of the Year in the 2013 ARIA Awards.

== Background and development ==
"Get Along" is a song which deals with the damage inflicted by religious, cultural and racial intolerance. It is a stripped back pop ballad with minimal instrumental accompaniment. Sebastian said that in the lead up to the birth of his first child in early 2012 he began analysing the world his son would grow up in. He explained that while he had always taken notice of the state of world affairs, he had never written about it in song, as he had never felt it was his position or role "to put it to paper as a songwriter". Sebastian said, "It sends your brain into overload when you are expecting your first child. It definitely makes you take a step back to try to gain some perspective on this world we live in. This song tries to encapsulate that. The hunger for utopia, that perfect world where everyone just accepts people. Obviously that's not a world we currently live in, and not a world my son has inherited." Sebastian says he started thinking about "why it is that we live in such a tumultuous world that is so full of beauty, but on the flipside also just so full of hate". He said it is his favourite song he has written, and that he is proud of its message that if people were more accepting of different religions, cultures and races the world could be a better place. He added, "Just this year Rodney King died and his whole slogan I guess was 'Can we all get along'."

== Release and promotion ==
"Get Along" was serviced to radio in the first week of November 2012, and was the most added song to Australian radio in its first week. It reached number 24 on the National Airplay Chart in its first full week of radio play. The song is currently only available to download from the album as no individual single has been released as yet. Sebastian performed "Get Along" on the Seven Network's morning program Sunrise on 12 November, and also on the first night of the 2012 X Factor Grand Final on 19 November.

== Reception ==
=== Critical response ===
"Get Along" has received positive reviews. Jamie Horne, music journalist for the Border Mail called the song "inspiring" and said it was "a lyrical triumph." Take 40 wrote, "It really shows the beautiful timbre of his voice, and has a very inspiring message." Cameron Adams from the Herald Sun said Sebastian's songwriting had matured and that he showed new depth with "Get Along". Music site auspOp wrote, "This one is designed to get you thinking. To tap into your emotions. 'Get Along' is a song about hope, peace and understanding and a dream that perhaps one day we'll all be united, together as one people, one world, despite our differences in opinion, religion, creed and race. [...] Good on Guy for shining some light and spreading the love." David Lim, a music journalist and announcer on radio station Joy 94.9, wrote, ""The emotive political ballad 'Get Along' is possibly the best single Sebastian has ever released. I just can't get over how great his observant lyrics about religious wars are. The hook – 'Dear God, dear soul, dear Mary, Mohammed... can we all just get along?' – absolutely rips right through the heart. Jessica Tisdell from music site Novastreamusic said, "The lyrics are definitely heart-warming and send a great message to humanity. You can almost tell that Guy's song writing has matured and focuses more on real life rather than recent dance pop songs."

=== Commercial performance ===
"Get Along" debuted at number thirty-four on the Australian ARIA Singles Chart before ascending to number-five the following week, becoming Sebastian's fourth top ten single from "Armageddon". It was also Sebastian's 11th top ten single in Australia and his ninth to peak in the top five. Although only released in mid November it was the 12th highest selling Australian artist single in Australia in 2012. It achieved triple platinum certificatio and charted at number 23 on the 2013 Australian Artist End of Year Chart. "Get Along" also reached number nine and gold certification in New Zealand, Sebastian's sixth top single there.

=== Accolades ===
"Get Along" was a finalist in the 2013 International Songwriting Competition in the Pop/Top 40 category, and was awarded an honourable mention. The International Songwriting Competition is an annual song contest for both aspiring and established songwriters. The judging panel is made up of musicians, songwriters and industry experts, and songs are judged on creativity, originality, lyrics, melody, arrangement and overall likeability. The song reached the final five nominees for the APRA Song of the Year Award. It is the largest peer voted music award in Australia, voted for by the songwriter, composer and music publisher members of APRA. "Get Along" also received a nomination for Song of the Year in the 2013 ARIA Awards.

== Music video ==
Sebastian wanted the video to "capture life and love" in countries around the world, to put faces on people and create "a visual journey that encapsulates the beauty and essence of people coming from different cultures and backgrounds". Sebastian said, "There's a line in the song that says 'it's easy if they're faceless to hate the other side'. And it's so true. When somebody is human to you, when they have a face, when they have a soul, when they have a heart, when you get to know that person, it's hard to have the same hate for them." Filmmaker Phillip Graybill and director Hayden Topperwien travelled to 13 different countries to film footage of people going about their daily lives. Countries visited included Madagascar, Kenya, India, and Indonesia. The video starts with a short interlude showing black and white images of war, and the assault of Rodney King by Los Angeles police officers in 1991. The remainder of the video shows the footage filmed by Graybill and Topperwien, interspersed with Sebastian shown singing against a simple grey background.

== Credits and personnel ==
- Guy Sebastian – composer, vocals
- Ian Barter – composer, producer
- Pro-Jay – programming
- Miles Walker – mixing
- James Klang – assistant engineer

== Charts ==
=== Weekly charts ===
Chart (2012–2013)	Peak position
Australia (ARIA)	5
New Zealand (Recorded Music NZ)	9

=== Year-end charts ===
Chart (2012)	Position
Australian Artist (ARIA)	12
Chart (2013)	Position
Australian Artist (ARIA)	23

== Certifications ==
Region	Certification	Certified units/sales
Australia (ARIA)	3× Platinum	210,000^{‡}
New Zealand (RMNZ)	Gold	7,500^{*}
^{*} Sales figures based on certification alone.^{‡} Sales+streaming figures based on certification alone.
