= Who's That Girl (Guy Sebastian song) =

2010 single by Guy Sebastian ft. Eve

Single by Guy Sebastian featuring Eve

from the album Twenty Ten
- Released: 5 November 2010
- Recorded: 2010
- Genre: Electro-R&B
- Length: 3:39
- Label: Sony Music Australia
- Songwriters: Guy Sebastian, Eve
- Producers: Guy Sebastian, Andre Harris

Guy Sebastian singles chronology
"Never Hold You Down" (2010)	"Who's That Girl" (2010)	"All Night Long" (2011)

Eve singles chronology
"Patron Tequila" (2009)	"Who's That Girl" (2010)	"Money in da Bank" (2011)

Audio sample
- "Who's That Girl": file; help

Music video
- Official Music Video: Who's That Girl ft Eve on YouTube

"Who's That Girl"

Single by Guy Sebastian featuring Cinta Laura
- Released: 2011
- Songwriters: Guy Sebastian, Eve

Cinta Laura singles chronology
"Guardian Angel" (2010)	"Who's That Girl" (2011)	"Tulalit" (2012)

"Who's That Girl" is an up-tempo electro R&B song performed by Australian singer-songwriter Guy Sebastian which features American rapper Eve. It was written by Sebastian, with Eve writing and performing the rap. Sebastian co-produced the song with Andre Harris. Released as a digital download on 5 November 2010, it was the only single released in Australia from Sebastian's retrospective album Twenty Ten. "Who's That Girl" reached number one on the ARIA Singles Chart, Sebastian's fifth of six number one singles in Australia and Eve's first. It reached 6× platinum certification in 2023. "Who's That Girl" also reached number one and 2× platinum certification in New Zealand, Sebastian's second number one single there.

"Who's That Girl" was shortlisted for the 2011 APRA Song of the Year and won the APRA Urban Work of the Year. Sebastian received ARIA Award nominations for Single of the Year and Best Pop Release and won the Highest Selling Single ARIA. He was also nominated as "Most Popular Australian Artist".

== Background ==
"Who's That Girl" was recorded in Australia and London. Sebastian stated in an interview that he recorded his own vocals at his home, "The funny thing about that single is that I did all the vocals in my dining room in Australia and we sent it across to Andre Harris who did his thing on the track by adding his magic production touch." He also spoke about writing the song, "It's actually a completely original song that I kept going back to rewrite over and over again because, at first, the musician in me thought it was too simple in its structure... but then I realised that sometimes simplicity is the best way forward to keep things fun and hook-y." Sebastian told The New Zealand Herald that it was based on songs he was hearing on the radio from the likes of David Guetta, and The Black Eyed Peas. "I'm not reinventing the wheel, not at all. I had that melody, and I could have gone so many ways with it. I could have produced an old-school soul album, but I went towards what you hear on the radio. I'm not going to lie, I listen to what's popular at the moment, and it's what I'm really liking as well."

Sebastian considered getting Eve on the song as quite a coup. He said she was on her way to London when she opened the email with the song attached and responded immediately, saying she would love to be involved. Eve said in an interview with Nova FM while she was in Australia to film the video, "I got an email, and when I heard it I was like 'hot song. Ok lets do it'. When asked if she did any research on Sebastian before agreeing to do the song she said "No. This is the thing. I don't really get into that. Like as an artist. It's more about the music, and if the song is hot, I'll deal with it. And I was like 'Ok, I'll do this song'."

== Release and promotion ==
"Who's That Girl" was serviced to Australian radio stations on 5 November 2010. It was initially scheduled for radio release four days earlier, but had to be delayed due to last minute tinkering of the song. It was the most added song to radio in its second week and peaked at 13 in national radio airplay. Sebastian and Eve performed "Who's That Girl" on the grand final episode of The X Factor in November 2010, which aired in both Australia and New Zealand. This was the only time Sebastian and Eve performed the song together on stage. Since then either his current backing vocalist Carmen Smith performs the rap or he performs it himself. In the week following The X Factor final Sebastian visited Auckland New Zealand to promote the single and album with an instore appearance and media interviews. "Who's That Girl" was used by Channel 7 throughout December 2010 and January 2011 in commercials promoting the new season of Desperate Housewives. In December 2010 Sebastian performed at a private event to welcome Oprah Winfrey to Sydney during her trip to Australia. Footage of him singing "Who's That Girl" with Winfrey in the front row of the audience was shown during Oprah! The Interview which screened on Channel Ten on 14 December. Sebastian sang "Who's That Girl" during Channel Nine's Today at Suncorp Stadium in Brisbane on Australia Day 2011. On the first live show of the 2011 season of The X Factor in September the judges performed a medley of their hits. Sebastian sang "Who's That Girl". In November he performed at the annual ARIA Awards for the second year in succession. He sang a medley of "Who's That Girl" and his following single "Don't Worry Be Happy".

== Reception ==
=== Critical response ===
The Daily Telegraph music editor Kathy McCabe wrote, "This one has one of those choruses which will be on a continuous loop in your head all day. [....] But this isn't one of those throw away tracks artists stick on a best-of album; not only has it reached the upper echelon of the Australian charts but it has a good shot at breaking him overseas." In a review of Twenty Ten Jamie Horne of The Border Mail said, "the dancefloor-ready "Who's That Girl" with US rapper Eve should make it clear that the former 'Fro' is not that uncool after all". Chris Havercroft from X-Press Magazine wrote, "It is the dancefloor where Sebastian does his most damage and when teaming up with rapper Eve for new single Who's That Girl he shows his knack for targeting his audience".

=== Commercial performance ===
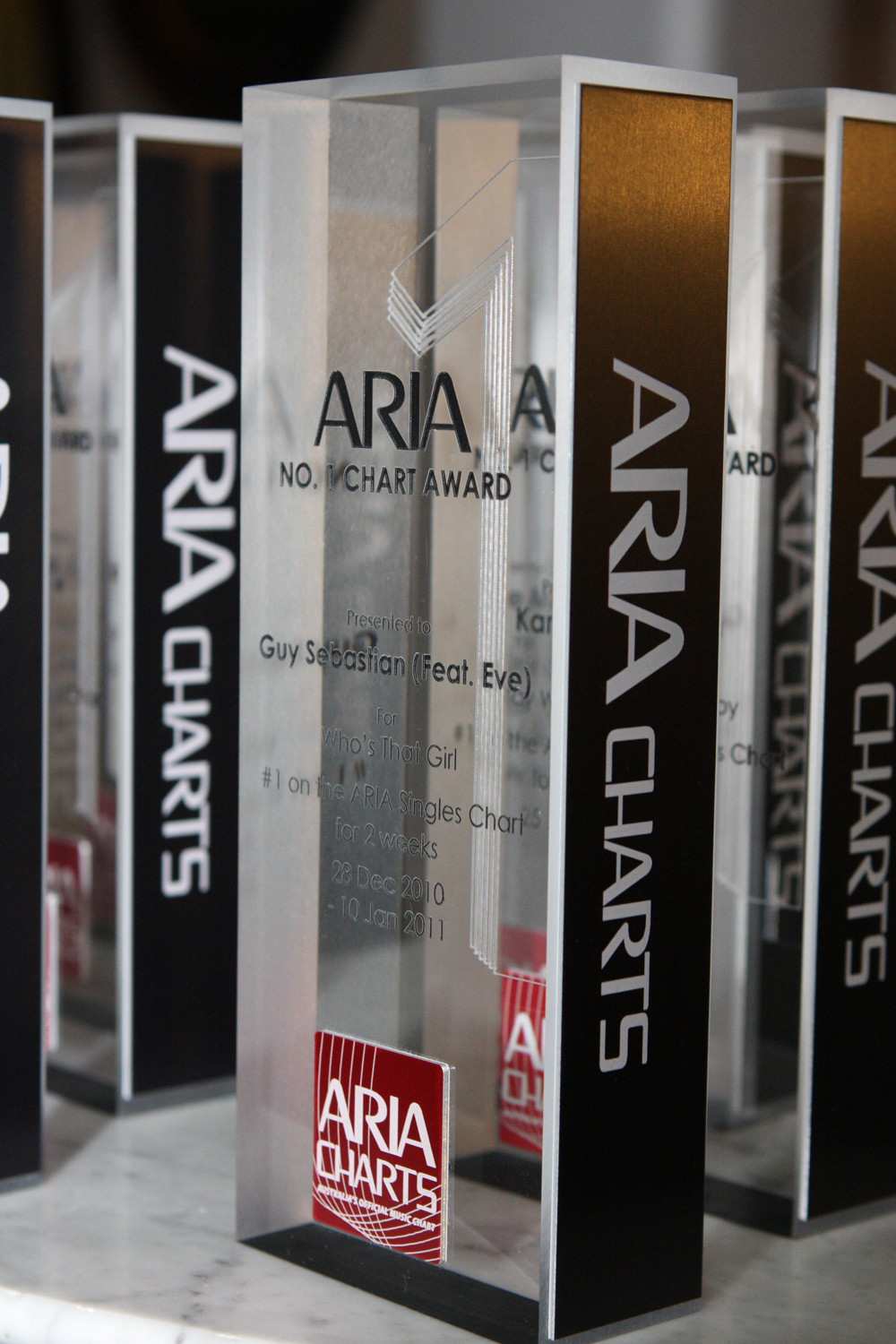
ARIA Charts Award for No. 1 single, "Who's That Girl" by Guy Sebastian featuring Eve.

"Who's That Girl" debuted on the ARIA Singles Chart at number 11, and reached number one in its fifth week, Sebastian's fifth of six number one singles in Australia and Eve's first. Sebastian is currently the only Australian male artist in Australian music history to achieve six number one singles, and he is third overall for all Australian acts. Only Kylie Minogue and Delta Goodrem have achieved more. It was also Sebastian's seventh of 14 top ten singles in Australia. "Who's That Girl" spent ten weeks in the ARIA top ten, including two non-consecutive weeks at number one. It stayed in the ARIA Top 50 for 19 weeks, spending 37 weeks in total in the ARIA Top 100. It became the second highest selling Australian artist single of 2010 within six weeks of release, and was also the fifth highest selling Australian artist song in 2011. It reached 6× platinum certification in 2023. "Who's That Girl" won the Highest Selling Single ARIA and Sebastian was nominated as "Most Popular Australian Artist" in the 2011 ARIA Music Awards. "Who's That Girl" debuted at number 16 on the New Zealand Singles Chart, and reached number one in its eleventh week. It was Sebastian's fourth New Zealand top 10 single and second number one there. It received 2× platinum certification from the Recording Industry Association of New Zealand (RIANZ).

=== Accolades ===
"Who's That Girl" was shortlisted for the APRA Song of the Year in 2011, Sebastian's third song to be shortlisted for this award, and it was awarded the APRA Urban Work of the Year. It also received industry voted 2011 ARIA Award nominations for Single of the Year and Best Pop Release.

== Music video ==
The music video for "Who's That Girl" was shot at the Paddington Town Hall in Sydney. Eve came to Australia in mid November to film the video with Sebastian. It premiered on YouTube on 26 November 2010. The simple, uncluttered video shows Sebastian singing about seeing the mystery girl in a dance club, with his mental images of her projected onto the walls. Eve makes a cameo appearance for the rap part of the track.

== Track listing ==
- Digital download
1. "Who's That Girl" (featuring Eve) – 3:39
- Indonesian CD single
1. "Who's That Girl" (featuring Cinta Laura) – 3:41

Other versions

- No Rap Version
- 7th Heaven Club Mix
- 7th Heaven Radio Edit
- Club Junkies Club Mix

== Credits and personnel ==
- Writers – Guy Sebastian (song lyrics and music), Eve (rap)
- Lead vocals – Guy Sebastian
- Featured rap – Eve
- Production – Andre Harris, Guy Sebastian

Credits are taken from Twenty Ten album liner notes

== Charts ==
=== Weekly charts ===
Chart (2010–2011)	Peak position
Australia (ARIA)	1
New Zealand (Recorded Music NZ)	1

=== Year-end charts ===
Chart (2010)	Position
Australia (ARIA)	42
Australian Artists (ARIA)	2

Chart (2011)	Position
Australia (ARIA)	47
Australian Artists (ARIA)	5

== Certifications ==
Region	Certification	Certified units/sales
Australia (ARIA)	6× Platinum	420,000^{‡}
New Zealand (RMNZ)	2× Platinum	30,000^{*}
^{*} Sales figures based on certification alone.^{‡} Sales+streaming figures based on certification alone.

== Release history ==
Region	Date	Format	Label	Ref.
Australia	5 November 2010	Digital download	Sony Music Australia	
New Zealand	5 November 2010	Digital download	Sony Music Australia	

== See also ==
- List of number-one singles in Australia in 2010
- List of number-one singles in Australia in 2011
- List of top 10 singles in 2010 (Australia)
- List of top 10 singles in 2011 (Australia)
- List of artists who reached number one on the Australian singles chart
- List of best-selling singles in Australia
- List of number-one singles from the 2010s (New Zealand)
