= Battle Scars =

Single by Guy Sebastian featuring Lupe Fiasco

from the album Armageddon and Food & Liquor II: The Great American Rap Album Pt. 1
- Released: 10 August 2012
- Genre: Hip hop; R&B
- Length: 4:08
- Label: Sony Australia; Atlantic; 1st & 15th; WEA International Inc.
- Songwriters: Guy Sebastian; David Harris; Wasalu Jaco
- Producer: Pro-Jay

Guy Sebastian singles chronology
"Gold" (2012)	"Battle Scars" (2012)	"Get Along" (2012)

Lupe Fiasco singles chronology
"Lamborghini Angels" (2012)	"Battle Scars" (2012)	"Poor Decisions" (2013)

Food & Liquor II single

Music video
- "Battle Scars" (International) on YouTube "Battle Scars" (Australia and NZ) on YouTube

"Battle Scars" is a song performed by Australian recording artist Guy Sebastian featuring American rapper Lupe Fiasco. It was released digitally in Australia and New Zealand on 10 August 2012 by Sony Music Entertainment. The song lyrics and music were written by Sebastian and David Ryan Harris, with the rap written by Fiasco. It was the third single lifted from Sebastian's seventh album Armageddon. Fiasco added "Battle Scars" to his fourth album, Food & Liquor II: The Great American Rap Album Pt. 1 in countries other than Australia. It was released as the fourth single on 28 August 2012, credited as a duet.

"Battle Scars" debuted at number one on the ARIA Singles Chart in its first week of release and has been certified 14× platinum. It was Sebastian's tenth of 14 top ten singles in Australia and sixth to reach number one, and Fiasco's third top ten and first number one single. "Battle Scars" was the third highest selling single in Australia in 2012, the highest selling single by an Australian act. Sebastian received ARIA Award nominations for Best Pop Release and Best Male Artist for the song. "Battle Scars" also reached number two and triple platinum certification in New Zealand and gold certification in Sweden.

In the United States "Battle Scars" peaked on the Billboard charts at number 71 on the Hot 100, number 23 on the Digital Song Chart and number one on the R&B/Hip-hop Digital Song Chart. The song spent 20 nonconsecutive weeks in the Hot 100 and has been certified platinum. "Battle Scars" also reached number two in Norway. It was nominated for an NAACP Image Award for Outstanding Duo, Group or Collaboration, and won the R&B/Hip category in the 2013 International Songwriting Competition.

== Background ==
"Battle Scars" is a song about the scars left from hurtful and broken relationships. In a radio interview Sebastian said, "It's about your own personal battle scars and for every individual those are different; some might be words or labels... it might be relationship scars. When I wrote this song, and when Lupe wrote his bits, we just really wanted it to be something that just inspired people to, sort of, confront those things, and also maybe try and work to think about burying and ripping up those labels; throwing them away."

Sebastian said Fiasco was always his first preference to contribute the rap, as he wanted to stay true to the theme of the song and found Fiasco's work very deep. Sebastian said, "He doesn't rap about booty shaking or cash, he's much more political and insightful and exactly what I wanted." He looked at other options as well, as he didn't know if Fiasco would be interested, and said he was overwhelmed when he heard Fiasco wanted to come on board. Explaining why he agreed to participate in the song Fiasco said, "Guy's vocal performance first got me about the song because it's great and then the story of the song was attractive; I just tried to enhance it." Speaking of what it meant to have Fiasco collaborate on "Battle Scars", Sebastian said, "Just to get someone like Lupe on the track I knew it was going to have heart and have depth." He said of Fiasco, "He is a lyrical genius and he has really portrayed the emotion of the track". Sebastian says "Battle Scars" is his "proudest release", adding, "Every now and then in your career you release something that you feel has a deeper meaning and purpose. I don't know how it will chart, but I am really proud of it regardless of what it does."

== Composition and recording ==
"Battle Scars" is an R&B ballad with a hip hop rap, and is written in the key of F minor. Sebastian and Fiasco contribute equally in the song, with the sung and rap vocals interspersed throughout. Sebastian performs the pre-chorus and chorus, with Fiasco performing the intro and two rap verses. Both artists contribute to the bridge. Music writer and radio announcer David Lim said, "unlike the majority of these rent-a-rapper verses, Lupe Fiasco's contribution here actually feels valid and in equal weighting to Guy's sung vocals. I don't know, y'guys – it just felt like they spent a minute on this and it's not just another vanity project."

In interviews during the release week Sebastian explained that usually when he writes a song he comes up with the melody first with no words. However this time some of the lyrics came at the same time. While driving to a friend's house he started singing "These battle scars", and then other phrases such as "Don't look like they're fading, don't look like they're ever going away" came to him. These words form part of the chorus, which is used repeatedly during the song, and is one of its two hooks. After completing the song with David Ryan Harris it was recorded leaving all the parts where Sebastian envisaged the rap should go.

When Fiasco was in Australia for Supafest he came to Sebastian's Sydney studio to record the rap. He already had two versions prepared, one with war themed lyrics. Sebastian decided to use that one without listening to the other one. Fiasco said he came into the studio with other rap pieces as well. One was the phrase "Hope the wound heals but it never does, that's cause you're at war with love". He explained that he does not feel fully confident musically when collaborating with other artists, and he had been prepared to discard those lines if Sebastian didn't like them. Sebastian decided to use the phrase as the intro and also three times in the bridge with slight variations to some of the words. It became the second hook in the song. Fiasco said, "I didn't recognise that. I just looked at it as a filler and maybe it will work. But for him to take it like 'No, that's dope and we're going to use it, and we're going to put it here and here', it was kind of like 'yeah thanks man'. It made me feel really good."

== Release and promotion ==
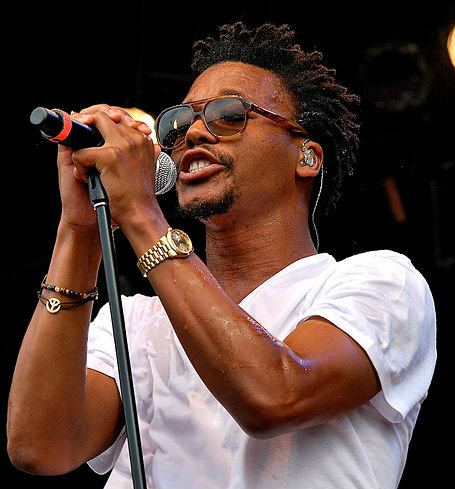
Lupe Fiasco is featured on "Battle Scars"

"Battle Scars" was serviced to radio on 2 August 2012, and released digitally in Australia and New Zealand on 10 August 2012, with Fiasco credited as a featured artist. The song was the most added track to radio in its first week in Australia, debuting at number 31 on the National Airplay Chart. It became the most played song in Australia in its seventh week, where it remained for two weeks. Sebastian was interviewed by media and music sites including Music Fix, BigPond Music and The Music Network to promote the single. He also had interviews with radio stations, and performed the song live on the Today Network's Fifi and Jules show on 13 August 2012. Fred Day, a member of Three Wishez, who were in the final 12 of the 2011 series of The X Factor, performed Fiasco's rap during this performance.

Fiasco added "Battle Scars" to his album Food & Liquor II: The Great American Rap Album Pt. 1 in countries other than Australia, credited as a duet. It was released as the fourth single on 28 August instead of the scheduled release "Form Follows Function". Fiasco came to Australia in mid September to promote the single and the release of his album, and he and Sebastian performed it live for the first time on The X Factor. They also performed the song in the US on the Late Show with David Letterman and at Fiasco's New York album launch on 27 September. It was used in the US in the TV promotion of the film Red Dawn. In November Sebastian and Fiasco performed "Battle Scars" at the 2012 ARIA Music Awards. Sebastian and Fiasco continued the US promotion of the song in early 2013, performing it on Late Night With Jimmy Fallon with The Roots, and on Conan.

== Reception ==
=== Critical response ===
"Battle Scars" has received positive reviews. David Lim wrote, "'Battle Scars' is a massive bruised ballad with a titan hook that just beats you down with no mercy. The ominous piano-driven ballad, punctuated with crisp beats resembles something Ryan Tedder would pitch to A-list American chart toppers.[....]This next step in Guy's career deserves to be an international affair and let's hope with top-notch singles like 'Battle Scars', he can begin to break new territories." Hip hop indie/pop site Hillydilly said of the song, "Aussie singer/songwrtier [sic], Guy Sebastian, has linked up with Lupe Fiasco for this epic song from his new album. Evidently this guy can sing because he sure does let it be known on 'Battle Scars'. There is also a perfect amount of Lupe on this track—he is not tucked away on some last verse shit, rather he is found throughout the song. This is a good one." David Fredrick from music discovery site Gigity wrote, "Guy Sebastian, the Australian pop/R&B singer just released a brand new track 'Battle Scars' ft. Lupe Fiasco and it is an instant classic that will surely grab your attention." Kate Winch from Mosca Media said, "In this effort, the combination of Lupe Fiasco's rap skills with Guy's strong vocals results in a catchy pop, hip hop track thats chorus will become firmly entrenched in your head after just one listen."

Battle Scars also received positive mentions in a number of reviews for Fiasco's album. HipHop DX said, "The Guy Sebastian-assisted "Battle Scars" is another winner, oozing mass appeal without deteriorating into sloshy mainstream". Luciana Villalba from review site The Young Folk called Sebastian's voice "remarkable", and included Battle Scars in her list of "must-listen" tracks. A reviewer for Entertainment site Pop Culture Podcast wrote, "This one has chart topping single written all over it but due to its genuine lyrics and universal subject matter it doesn't feel like one that you have to 'sell out' to make." XXL Magazine said "Battle Scars" moved "towards mainstream without completely deviating", sacrificing little "sonically or lyrically, instead relying on booming pop/sung choruses to denote any notable shift." Colin McQuire from Pop Matters wrote that it showcased Fiasco's "knack for crafting a great pop hook" and the "piano-laden groove adds the texture it needs to be a bona fide Top 40 hit, and Fiasco's crisp broken-hearted rhymes illustrate the exact type of accessibility the track needs to gain commercial notoriety." ARIA named "Battle Scars" as one of the top Australian music moments of 2012, saying, "We all knew Guy had serious talent, but this year he took his song writing to another level with the single 'Battle Scars'.[....] One of the greatest songs of the year without a doubt.

=== Commercial performance ===
"Battle Scars" debuted at number one on the ARIA Singles Chart, becoming Sebastian's tenth of 14 top ten singles in Australia and sixth to reach number one. It was Fiasco's third Australian top ten and first number one single. Sebastian has achieved the most number one singles for an Australian male singer in Australian chart history, and is third overall for all Australian acts. Only Kylie Minogue and Delta Goodrem have achieved more. "Battle Scars" spent 12 weeks in the top five, including six weeks at number one, and was the third highest selling single in Australia in 2012, the highest selling single by an Australian act. "Battle Scars" also reached number two and triple platinum certification in New Zealand. In the United States, "Battle Scars" spent 20 weeks in the US Billboard Hot 100, peaking at number 71, Sebastian's first song to chart in North America. In addition to the Hot 100, "Battle Scars" reached number 23 on the Billboard Digital Songs Chart and number one on the Billboard R&B/Hip-hop Digital Song Chart. It has been certified platinum in the US for sales of 1,000,000. It spent eight weeks in the Swedish chart, peaking at 46 and was certified gold there. "Battle Scars" also spent 13 weeks in the top ten in Norway, including six nonconsecutive weeks at number two.

=== Accolades ===
"Battle Scars" received an ARIA Music Award nomination for Best Pop Release, and Sebastian was nominated as Best Male Artist for the song. "Battle Scars" won Song of 2012 in the POPreplublic.tv. IT List Awards. The nominees are chosen by POPreplublic, with public vote deciding the winner. The song was also nominated for a 2013 NAACP Image Award for Outstanding Duo, Group or Collaboration. The Awards are presented by the American National Association for the Advancement of Colored People. "Battle Scars" won the R&B/Hip category in the 2013 International Songwriting Competition. The judging panel is made up of musicians, songwriters and industry experts, and songs are judged on creativity, originality, lyrics, melody, arrangement and overall likeability.

== Music video ==
The music video for the song "Battle Scars" was directed by Jonathan & Josh Baker and filmed in New York in locations including industrial areas with destroyed cars and burning oil drums and ruined derelict buildings, where Sebastian and Fiasco are shown performing the song. Individuals filmed in a variety of cityscapes are shown periodically, expressing their sadness and personal scars by writing and holding up signs with words that show how they feel. The words they use include "abandoned", "abused", "fatherless", "outcast", "empty", "slave" and "bullied". Near the end of the video they tear up their signs to symbolise moving on from their hurt. Reviewer Kate Winch gave the video a four out of five rating saying, "This video follows a classic music video style, showing the artists performing with additional actors staring wistfully in cut aways. As always, there is a reason that something becomes a classic and that is because it works – just as it does here."

== Track listing ==
Digital single

1. "Battle Scars" (featuring Lupe Fiasco) – 4:09

Other version

- 7th Heaven Club Mix

== Credits and personnel ==
- Guy Sebastian – composer, vocals
- Lupe Fiasco – composer, vocals
- David Ryan Harris – composer
- Pro-Jay – producer
- Miles Walker – mixing
- James Kang – assistant engineer

== Charts ==
=== Weekly charts ===
Weekly chart performance for "Battle Scars"
Chart (2012–2013)	Peak position
Australia (ARIA)	1
CIS Airplay (TopHit)	50
New Zealand (Recorded Music NZ)	2
Norway (VG-lista)	2
Russia Airplay (TopHit)	47
Sweden (Sverigetopplistan)	46
Ukraine Airplay (TopHit)	145
US Billboard Hot 100	71
US Hot R&B/Hip-Hop Songs (Billboard)	20
US Hot Rap Songs (Billboard)	14

=== Year-end charts ===
2012 year-end chart performance for "Battle Scars"
Chart (2012)	Position
Australia Singles Chart (ARIA)	3
Australian Artist Singles Chart (ARIA)	1
New Zealand (RIANZ)	14

2013 year-end chart performance for "Battle Scars"
Chart (2013)	Position
Australian Artist Singles Chart (ARIA)	22
US R&B/Hip-Hop Songs (Billboard)	54

=== Decade-end charts ===
2010s-end chart performance for "Battle Scars"
Chart (2010–2019)	Position
Australia (ARIA)	19
Australian Artist Singles (ARIA)	3

== Certifications ==
Region	Certification	Certified units/sales
Australia (ARIA)	14× Platinum	980,000^{‡}
Denmark (IFPI Danmark)	Gold	45,000^{‡}
New Zealand (RMNZ)	3× Platinum	45,000^{*}
Sweden (GLF)	Gold	20,000^{‡}
United Kingdom (BPI)	Silver	200,000^{‡}
United States (RIAA)	3× Platinum	3,000,000^{‡}
^{*} Sales figures based on certification alone.^{‡} Sales+streaming figures based on certification alone.

== Release history ==
Country	Date	Format	Label
Australia	10 August 2012	Digital download	Sony Music Australia
New Zealand	10 August 2012	Digital download	Sony Music Australia
Worldwide	28 August 2012	Digital download	Atlantic, 1st & 15th /WEA International Inc.

== See also ==
- List of number-one singles of 2012 (Australia)
- List of artists who reached number one on the Australian singles chart
- List of best-selling singles in Australia
