= Don't Worry Be Happy (Guy Sebastian song) =

Single by Guy Sebastian

from the album Armageddon
- Released: 18 November 2011
- Genre: Pop, pop rock
- Length: 4:14
- Label: Sony
- Songwriter: Guy Sebastian

Guy Sebastian singles chronology
"All Night Long" (2011)	"Don't Worry Be Happy" (2011)	"Gold" (2012)

Music video
- "Don't Worry Be Happy" on YouTube

"Don't Worry Be Happy" is a pop song written and performed by Australian recording artist Guy Sebastian. It is the lead single from Sebastian's seventh album Armageddon. "Don't Worry Be Happy" was released digitally in Australia on 18 November 2011. It peaked at number five on the ARIA Singles Chart, and has reached 5× platinum certification. It was Sebastian's eighth of 11 top ten singles in Australia. In 2012 "Don't Worry Be Happy" was nominated for the ARIA Music Award for Single of the Year and was shortlisted for the APRA Song of the Year. It has received 2013 APRA nominations for Most Played Australian Work and Pop Work of the Year.

== Background ==
"Don't Worry Be Happy" is an uptempo pop song Sebastian said he was inspired to write after experiencing the anger of a fellow motorist while driving in Los Angeles. He told The Daily Telegraph music editor Kathy McCabe, "I thought I knew the guy so as he pulled alongside me, I smiled and copped a tirade of abuse. I was in a really good mood because I was on the way to play cricket and while we were batting, I wrote the song. It's a good time for a song like this to remind yourself things aren't that bad". In an interview with Andrew Tijs of music site Noise 11 he said that he could sometimes be caught up in a little bit of "glass half empty" in his life, and he wrote the song as a reminder to himself and hopefully to others that life is good. When asked why he used the same title as the Bobby McFerrin classic, he said he was going to change it to just "Don't Worry" but thought, "It's such a famous saying and it's such a famous song, and even though this is a completely different song it says it as it is and works with the song". Sebastian said that while he was a fan of the Eurodance music that is so popular, and loved the production value of it, and had even used it himself in his previous single "Who's That Girl", he wanted a more organic sound with this song, "I've sampled live toms, the only synthie parts are some of the ducking basses that are in there. There's real piano and real guitars. [...] I wanted to have a more organic vibe to it. I wanted to be a little more musical with it." When Tijs observed that the song was very different from the songs currently filling the charts Sebastian replied, "It was a bit of a scary release because there's no mention of a club [...] It's a non-love song and a non-club song, so I was like 'Maybe I'm treading on some not successful ground or something', but hopefully it will go alright."

== Release and promotion ==
"Don't Worry Be Happy" was serviced to radio on 11 November 2011, and was the second most added song to radio in its second week. It peaked at number four in national radio airplay in early 2012. Sebastian performed the song on the Grand Final episode of Australia's The X Factor. He performed a medley of his previous single "Who's That Girl" and "Don't Worry Be Happy" at the 2011 ARIA Awards on 27 November 2011. Sebastian also performed the song on the Seven Network's morning program Sunrise on 1 December 2011. "Don't Worry Be Happy" was used by the network during December 2011 and January 2012 in commercials to promote their 2012 programs. The Armageddon Tour ran from June and July 2012, and the album was released on 12 October.

== Reception ==
=== Critical response ===
Vic Cardinali from music site Play It on Repeat said of the song, "It's a feel good, bright, upbeat dance pop song about being happy about what you've got in life [...] Guy easily sings over a bright, sparkling beat that I personally cannot help but move to (I tried. I really just sat here and said 'No. I'm not going to move.' – and found myself bobbing my head and hips back and forth)." Ellen Wapstra from [V] Music wrote, "Okay, if you need a pick-me-up this should do it. A great little tune about chilling out and enjoying life." Music site auspOp said the song was as "bright as sunshine". David Lim, a music journalist and announcer on radio station Joy 94.9 wrote, "It's feel good, sun-soaked and universally appealing in a way that you'd expect for an artist of his brand and following to be. Sonically, it's very pleasing to hear him stick to a more Bruno Mars-style pop. The warmer musical textures complements Guy's voice like you won't believe [...] 'Don't Worry Be Happy' is not here to snatch wigs, alter pop music trends, or fanfare a bold new direction for Guy. The concept really is as simple as the message behind the song – just a basic reminder to celebrate the simple things in life."

=== Commercial performance ===
"Don't Worry Be Happy" debuted at number seven on the ARIA Singles Chart, and rose to its peak of number five after six weeks. It was Sebastian's eighth of 11 top ten singles in Australia. Although only released in mid November it was the sixth highest selling Australian artist single of 2011. It was also the 11th highest selling Australian artist single in 2012. The song spent 19 weeks in the ARIA Top 50, including ten weeks in the top ten and was certified 5× platinum. "Don't Worry Be Happy" was nominated for the ARIA Single of the Year Award. In 2012 this award replaced the industry voted Song of the Year, and the nominees were the ten highest selling Australian singles released during the eligibility period, with the winner decided by public vote.

=== Accolades ===
In 2012 "Dont Worry Be Happy" was shortlisted for the APRA Song of the Year. This award is peer judged with the shortlist, final five nominees and winner voted for by the songwriting members of APRA. "Don't Worry Be Happy" has received 2013 APRA nominations for Most Played Australian Work and Pop Work of the Year.

== Music video ==
The video for "Don't Worry Be Happy" was filmed in Sydney, and was released to iTunes and other digital download sites on 21 November 2011. In the video Sebastian is seen as a businessman having a difficult day. He pours curdled milk over his breakfast cereal, steps out of his apartment building into a rain shower, and his day at the office is shown to be stressful. He walks down to the beach at lunch time appearing very disgruntled. As he begins to eat he looks across at the next bench and notices a sad obviously ill young girl sitting in a wheelchair next to her father. The businessman appears to come to the realisation that his day isn't as bad as it seemed. He puts down his food and runs into the ocean fully clothed, falling backwards into the water with a smile. The young girl breaks into a smile as well.

== Track listing ==
- Digital download
1. "Don't Worry Be Happy" – 4:14

== Personnel ==
- DNA – producer
- James Kang – assistant engineer
- Louis Schoorl – producer, engineer, guitars, keyboards, bass, drums, programming
- Guy Sebastian – composer, vocals, producer
- Miles Walker – mixing

== Charts ==
=== Weekly charts ===
Chart (2011–12)	Peak position
Australian Singles Chart	5
New Zealand Singles Chart	26

=== Year-end charts ===
Chart (2011)	Rank
Australian Singles Chart	76
Australian Artists Singles Chart	6
Chart (2012)	Rank
Australian Singles Chart	79
Australian Artists Singles Chart	11

== Certifications ==
Region	Certification	Certified units/sales
Australia (ARIA)	5× Platinum	350,000^{‡}
New Zealand (RMNZ)	Gold	7,500^{*}
^{*} Sales figures based on certification alone.^{‡} Sales+streaming figures based on certification alone.

== Release history ==
Region	Date	Format	Label
Australia	18 November 2011	Digital download	Sony Music Australia
New Zealand	18 November 2011	Digital download	Sony Music Australia

== See also ==
- List of top 10 singles in 2011 (Australia)
- List of best-selling singles in Australia
