= The Border Mail =

Daily newspaper published in Albury-Wodonga, Australia

- Type: Daily newspaper
- Format: Tabloid
- Owner(s): Australian Community Media
- Publisher: Australian Community Media
- Editor: Julie Coe
- Founded: 24 October 1903
- Headquarters: 1 McKoy Street, Wodonga, Victoria, 3690, Australia
- Circulation: Mon-Fri: 7,440; Sat: 14,700
- Website: bordermail.com.au

The Border Mail is a daily newspaper and online news brand published in Albury-Wodonga, Australia, serving the twin cities and the surrounding region. It was originally published as The Border Morning Mail and Riverina Times and later as the Border Morning Mail before changing its title to The Border Mail.

== History ==
The first edition was printed on 24 October 1903 under the title Border Morning Mail and Riverina Times by editor Hamilton Mott and his brother Decimus, and continued publishing under that title until 19 May 1920. The paper was known as the Border Morning Mail from 20 May 1920 until 1 July 1988, when it changed its title to The Border Mail. Originally published in Dean Street, Albury, the newspaper operated from a number of Albury locations before a shift in 1999 to the former Albury-Wodonga Development Corporation headquarters in Wodonga. A six-days-a-week tabloid, the newspaper predominantly covers local issues in the wider region alongside national and international news. Its editorial and op-ed pieces tend to reflect the quiet rural conservatism of its readership. The newspaper has provided extensive coverage of some of the longest-running political debates in the region, notably the long running saga involving plans to remove the main level crossing from central Wodonga and the route for the Hume Freeway bypass of Albury. The newspaper's editor is Julie Coe. Former editors were Hamilton Mott, Clifton Mott, Rex Mitchell, ex-West Australian Newspapers editor-in-chief Bob Cronin, James Thomson, John McCluskey, Graham Storer, Cameron Thompson, Simon Dulhunty, Newcastle Herald editor Heath Harrison, Di Thomas, Niall Boyle and Xavier Mardling.

== Acquisition ==
On 4 May 2006, the Mott family announced that they would accept a $162 million deal from John Fairfax Holdings to purchase the newspaper and its stake in the associated printing company. The deal ended over a century of family ownership.

== Publication history ==
| Publication name | Commenced publication | Ceased publication |
|---|---|---|
| Border Morning Mail and Riverina Times | 1903 | 1920 |
| Border Morning Mail | 1920 | 1988 |
| Border Mail | 1988 | - |

== Digitisation ==
Parts of the paper has been digitised as part of the Australian Newspapers Digitisation Program project of the National Library of Australia.

== See also ==
- List of newspapers in Australia
- List of newspapers in New South Wales
