= Universal Music Australia =

Australian division of Universal Music Group

Universal Music Australia Pty Ltd.
- Type: Division
- Industry: Music; Entertainment
- Founded: 1934; 92 years ago
- Headquarters: 150 William St, Sydney, New South Wales, Australia
- Area served: Oceania
- Parent: Universal Music Group
- Divisions: List of Universal Music Group labels
- Website: umusic.com.au

Universal Music Australia Pty Ltd. (UMA) is the largest Australian music corporation. It is a division of the Universal Music Group. Universal Music Australia's corporate headquarters are located in Sydney, Australia.

== Labels ==
Universal Music Australia operates local record labels, as well distribution deals with independent Australian labels. UMA also represents all Universal Music Group's international labels within Australia.

Australian labels include:

- Casablanca Records Australia
- Caroline Records
- Dew Process
- EMI Music Australia
- Island Records Australia

International labels include:

- Capitol Music Group
- Co-Op Records
- Def Jam
- Fiction Records
- Geffen Records
- Interscope-Geffen-A&M
- Island Records
- MCA Nashville
- PM:AM
- Polydor Records
- Republic Records
- Virgin Records

== Current and former Australian artists ==
=== Island Records Australia ===
- Adam Eckersley Band
- Andy Bull
- Boy & Bear
- The Cairos
- Chance Waters
- Clare Bowditch
- Dean Lewis
- Emma Birdsall
- Gin Wigmore
- Havana Brown
- Jinja Safari
- Marvin Priest
- Masketta Fall
- The McClymonts
- Neda
- Peta & The Wolves
- Redcoats
- Sinead Burgess
- The Son
- Tim Hart
- Tom Lark
- Vera Blue
- Winterbourne

=== Golden Era Records ===
- Hilltop Hoods

=== Mercury Records Australia ===
- Adam Martin
- Anja Nissen
- Cat Torres
- Celia Pavey
- Emma Pask
- Fatai
- Harrison Craig
- Karise Eden
- Lakyn Heperi
- Luke Kennedy
- Matt Corby
- Megan Washington
- Melanie Dyer
- Ms Murphy
- Penelope Austin
- The Preatures
- Rachael Leahcar
- Shannon Noll
- Spiderbait

=== Modular Recordings ===
- Architecture in Helsinki
- Bag Raiders
- Beni
- Canyons
- Cut Copy
- Jonathan Boulet
- Julian Hamilton
- Kim Moyes
- Ladyhawke
- Muscles
- Pond
- The Presets
- Sneaky Sound System
- Tame Impala
- Van She

=== Neon Records ===
- Thandi Phoenix
- Alfie Arcuri
- Ivan Gough
- Jebu
- Walden
- Zoe Badwi

=== Of Leisure ===
- Muto
- Jack Grace
- Young Franco
- Human Movement

=== Sony Music Australia ===
- So Fresh (Corperation [sic?] albums)
- Hits For Kids Pop Party

=== Universal Music Australia ===
- Diana Rouvas
- Grinspoon
- Icehouse (Regular/dIVA)
- Joe Moore
- Phrase

=== Dew Process ===
- Art of Sleeping
- Bernard Fanning
- Bluejuice
- Expatriate
- Gosling
- The Grates
- Guineafowl
- Jae Laffer
- Jebediah
- The John Steel Singers
- Last Dinosaurs
- The Living End
- Tkay Maidza
- The Panics
- Sarah Blasko
- Seeker Lover Keeper
- Whitley

=== Capitol Records ===
- 5 Seconds of Summer
- Alison Wonderland
- Angus Stone
- Birds of Tokyo
- Birtles & Goble
- Bob Evans
- Crowded House
- Empire of the Sun
- Grey Ghost
- King Cannons
- Little River Band
- Oh Mercy
- Papa vs Pretty

=== EMI Music Australia ===
- 360
- The Avalanches (Modular/Astralwerks/XL/EMI)
- Crowded House
- Johnny Farnham
- Meg Mac
- Middle Kids
- Pez
- Ricki-Lee
- The Saints
- Sam Bluer
- Slim Dusty
- Something for Kate
- Tina Arena
- Troye Sivan

=== Decca Records ===
- Paulini

== See also ==
- List of record labels
