= List of The Voice (Australian TV series) contestants =

This is a list of contestants who have appeared on the reality television competition, The Voice Australia.

Name	Age	Coach	Season	Finish
Abbie Cardwell	36	Keith Urban	Season 1	Battle Rounds
Adam Garrett	23	Joel Madden	Season 2	Showdown Rounds
Adam Hoek	25	Delta Goodrem	Season 1	Battle Rounds
Adam Martin	24	Keith Urban	Season 1	Second Live Round
Alex Gibson	26	Seal	Season 2	Second Live Round
Anna Weatherup	30	Delta Goodrem	Season 2	Battle Rounds
Anthony Dellamarta	31	Seal	Season 1	Battle Rounds
Bec & Sebastian (Bec and Sebastian Ivanov)	29/29	Ricky Martin	Season 2	Battle Rounds
Belinda Adams	39	Ricky Martin	Season 2	Battle Rounds
Ben Bennett	17	Delta Goodrem	Season 1	First Live Round
Ben Goldstein	20	Delta Goodrem	Season 2	Showdown Rounds
Ben Hazlewood	23	Joel Madden	Season 1	Semi-Finals
Brett Clarke	26	Keith Urban	Season 1	Battle Rounds
Brittany Cairns	19	Keith Urban	Season 1	Second Live Round
Cam Tapp	40	Keith Urban	Season 1	Battle Rounds
Carmen Smith	28	Joel Madden	Season 1	First Live Round (Disqualified)
Casey Withoos	22	Seal	Season 1	Battle Rounds
Caterina Torres	22	Ricky Martin	Season 2	First Live Round
Celia Pavey	19	Delta Goodrem	Season 2	3rd Place
Chris Ninni	34	Joel Madden	Season 1	Battle Rounds
Chris Sebastian	23	Seal	Season 1	Second Live Round
Chris Sheehy	22	Joel Madden	Season 2	Battle Rounds
Danni Da Ros	29	Delta Goodrem	Season 1	Second Live Round
Danni Hodson	20	Joel Madden	Season 2	Showdown Rounds
Danny Ross	30	Joel Madden	Season 2	4th Place
Darren Percival	40	Keith Urban	Season 1	Runner-up
Diana Rouvas	28	Keith Urban	Season 1	Semi-Finals
Emma Louise Birdsall	20	Seal	Season 1	Second Live Round
Emma Pask	35	Ricky Martin ^{[2]}	Season 2	Showdown Rounds
Fatai Veamatahau	16	Seal	Season 1	Semi-Finals
Glenn Cunningham	36	Delta Goodrem	Season 1	Semi-Finals
Glenn Whitehall	33	Keith Urban	Season 1	Battle Rounds
Hannah Darling	21	Seal ^{[2]}	Season 2	Showdown Rounds
Harrison Craig	18	Seal	Season 2	Winner
Imogen Brough	21	Ricky Martin	Season 2	Showdown Rounds
Jac Stone	23	Seal	Season 2	First Live Round
Jackie Sannia	17	Delta Goodrem	Season 2	Second Live Round
James Walker	19	Ricky Martin	Season 2	Showdown Rounds
Jaz Flowers	24	Keith Urban	Season 1	Battle Rounds
Jenna Dearness-Dark	16	Delta Goodrem	Season 2	Battle Rounds
Jerson Trinidad	39	Delta Goodrem	Season 1	Battle Rounds
Jesse & Ashleigh	17/17	Delta Goodrem	Season 1	Battle Rounds
Jessika Samarges	20	Joel Madden	Season 2	Battle Rounds
Jimmy Cupples	46	Keith Urban	Season 1	First Live Round
Josh Kyle	26	Delta Goodrem	Season 2	Showdown Rounds
Juliane Di Sisto	29	Ricky Martin	Season 2	Battle Rounds
Kaity Dunstan	16	Ricky Martin	Season 2	Battle Rounds
Karise Eden	19	Seal	Season 1	Winner
Kathy Hinch	25	Joel Madden	Season 2	Showdown Rounds
Katie Carr	26	Ricky Martin	Season 2	Battle Rounds
Katie Reeve	26	Ricky Martin	Season 2	Battle Rounds
Kelsie Rimmer	20	Keith Urban	Season 1	Battle Rounds
Kieran Fraser	38	Seal	Season 1	Battle Rounds
Kiyomi Vella	19	Joel Madden	Season 2	Semi-Finals
Lakyn Heperi	19	Joel Madden	Season 1	Second Live Round
Laura Bunting	24	Joel Madden	Season 1	First Live Round
Lauren Dawes	28	Seal	Season 2	Battle Rounds
Louise Roussety	29	Joel Madden	Season 2	Battle Rounds
Luke Kennedy	30	Ricky Martin	Season 2	Runner-up
Luke Mansini	26	Delta Goodrem	Season 2	Battle Rounds
Lyric McFarland	28	Joel Madden	Season 2	Showdown Rounds
Mahalia Barnes	26	Joel Madden	Season 1	Battle Rounds
Mali-Koa Hood	20	Joel Madden	Season 1	Battle Rounds
Matt Hetherington	41	Delta Goodrem	Season 1	First Live Round
Matty Chaps	28	Delta Goodrem	Season 1	Battle Rounds
Maya Weiss	18	Joel Madden	Season 2	Battle Rounds
Michael Duchesne	21	Seal	Season 1	First Live Round
Michael Paynter	27	Joel Madden	Season 2	First Live Round
Michael Stangel	45	Joel Madden ^{[1]}	Season 2	Second Live Round
Michelle Martinez	28	Seal	Season 2	Showdown Rounds
Michelle Serret-Cursio	36	Joel Madden	Season 1	Battle Rounds
Miss Murphy (Karen Andrews)	31	Ricky Martin	Season 2	Semi-Finals
Mitchell Anderson	44	Seal	Season 2	Semi-Finals
Mitchell Steele	21	Delta Goodrem	Season 2	Battle Rounds
Mitchell Thompson	18	Seal	Season 1	Battle Rounds
Nathan Allgood	20	Delta Goodrem	Season 2	Showdown Rounds
Nicholas Roy	32	Seal	Season 2	Showdown Rounds
Nick Kingswell	26	Ricky Martin	Season 2	Showdown Rounds
Nick Len	21	Joel Madden	Season 1	Battle Rounds
Nick Stenmark	28	Joel Madden	Season 2	Battle Rounds
Oscar Chavez	27	Delta Goodrem	Season 2	Battle Rounds
Paula Parore	35	Seal	Season 1	Battle Rounds
Peta Jeffress	27	Delta Goodrem	Season 1	Battle Rounds
Prinnie Stevens	31	Joel Madden	Season 1	Second Live Round
Rachael Leahcar	17	Delta Goodrem	Season 1	3rd Place
Rob Edwards	35	Delta Goodrem	Season 2	Showdown Rounds
Ryan Sanders	19	Seal	Season 2	Battle Rounds
Sam Ludeman	26	Seal	Season 1	First Live Round
Sarah De Bono	19	Joel Madden	Season 1	4th Place
Sarah Lloyd	24	Delta Goodrem	Season 1	Battle Rounds
Sarah Martin	29	Seal	Season 2	Battle Rounds
Shawne Kirke	28	Seal	Season 2	Showdown Rounds
Simon Meli	35	Ricky Martin	Season 2	Second Live Round
Simone Stacey	35	Seal	Season 2	Battle Rounds
Sione Felila	25	Ricky Martin	Season 2	Battle Rounds
Skye Elizabeth	26	Seal	Season 2	Battle Rounds
Sophie Phillis	26	Delta Goodrem	Season 2	Battle Rounds
Steve Clisby	67	Delta Goodrem ^{[4]}	Season 2	Semi-Finals
Taga Paa	26	Keith Urban	Season 1	First Live Round
Tim Morrison	32	Delta Goodrem	Season 2	First Live Round
Tim Moxey	27	Seal	Season 2	Battle Rounds
Viktoria Bolonina	20	Delta Goodrem	Season 1	Second Live Round
Yianna Stavrous	19	Joel Madden	Season 1	Battle Rounds
Yshrael Pascual	33	Seal	Season 1	Battle Rounds

== Notes ==
^{[1]} Originally from Delta Goodrem's team.
^{[2]} Originally from Joel Madden's team.
^{[3]} Originally from Ricky Martin's team.
^{[4]} Originally from Seal's team.
