= The Voice (Australian TV series) season 2 =

The Voice
- Season 2
- Promotional poster featuring coaches Goodrem, Seal, Martin, and Madden
- Hosted by: Darren McMullen; Faustina Agolley
- Judges: Joel Madden; Delta Goodrem; Seal; Ricky Martin
- Winner: Harrison Craig
- Winning coach: Seal
- Runner-up: Luke Kennedy

Release
- Original network: Nine Network
- Original release: 7 April – 17 June 2013

Season chronology
- ← Previous; Season 1 Next → Season 3

The second season of The Voice, the Australian reality talent show, premiered on 7 April 2013. All coaches and hosts from the previous season returned for their second season, except Keith Urban, who left the panel and was replaced by Ricky Martin.

This season was won by Harrison Craig, whose victory marked Seal's second and final win as a coach.

== Format ==
The season is part of the television franchise, The Voice and is based on a similar competition format in The Netherlands entitled The Voice of Holland. The winner receives a recording contract with Universal Music. This season consists of four phases: the blind auditions, battle phase, followed by the showdowns and finally the live performance shows.

For the second season, during the battle rounds phase of the competition, opposing coaches have the ability to steal the singer that was sent home by the original coach. If more than one coach hits their buzzer to recruit the singer in question, the contestant decides which coach to work with. This format was first used in the third season of the American version of The Voice.

== Coaches and hosts ==
Coaches and Host of The Voice Season 2

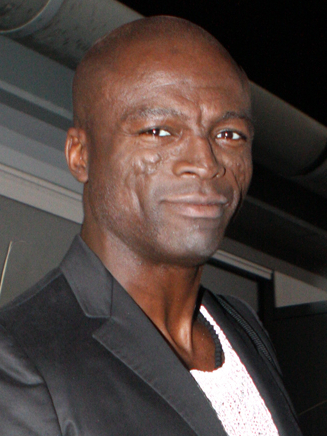
Seal

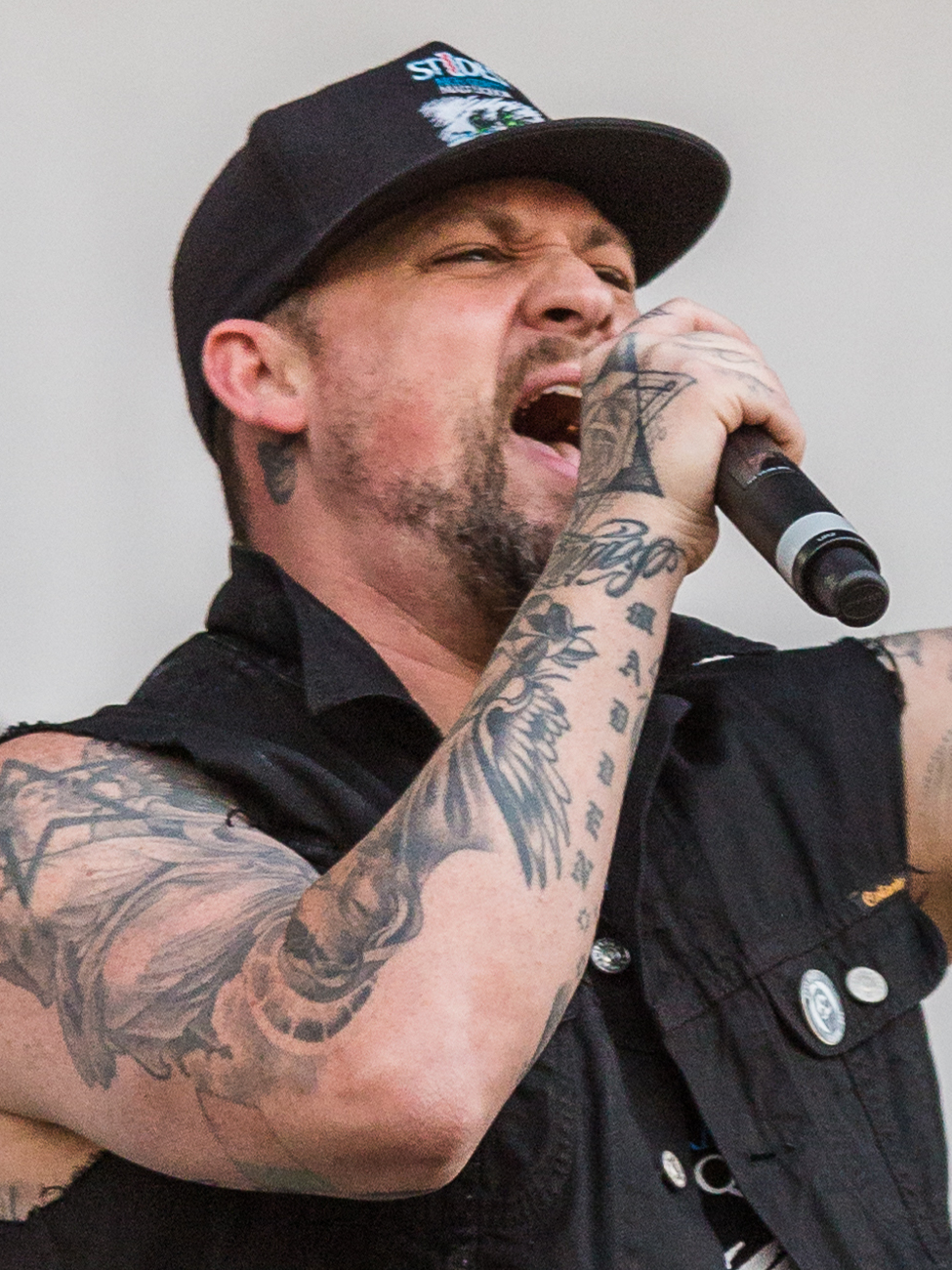
Joel Madden

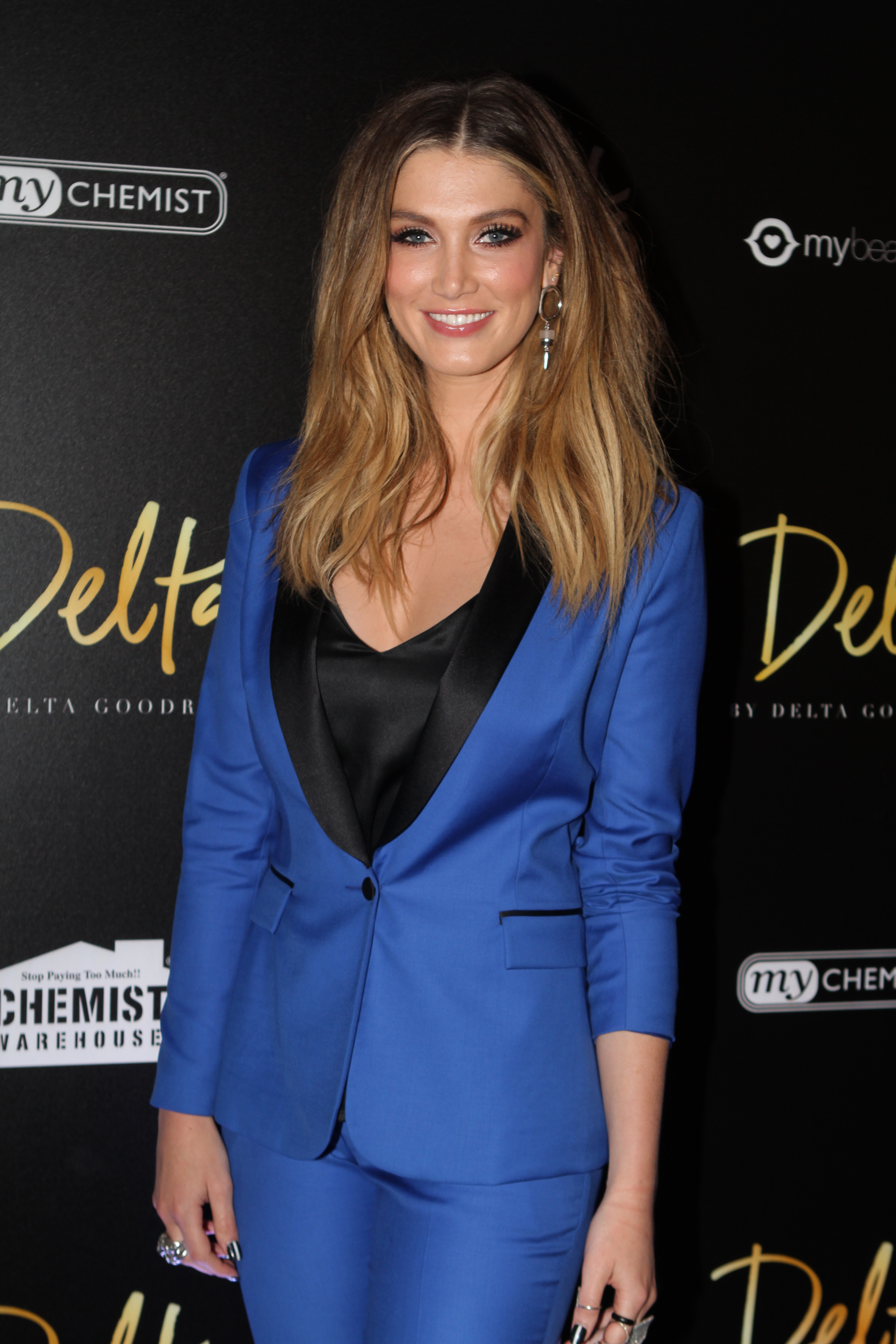
Delta Goodrem

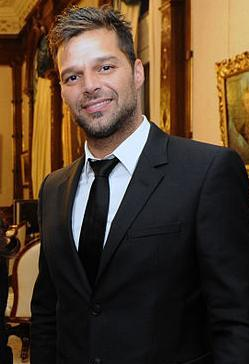
Ricky Martin

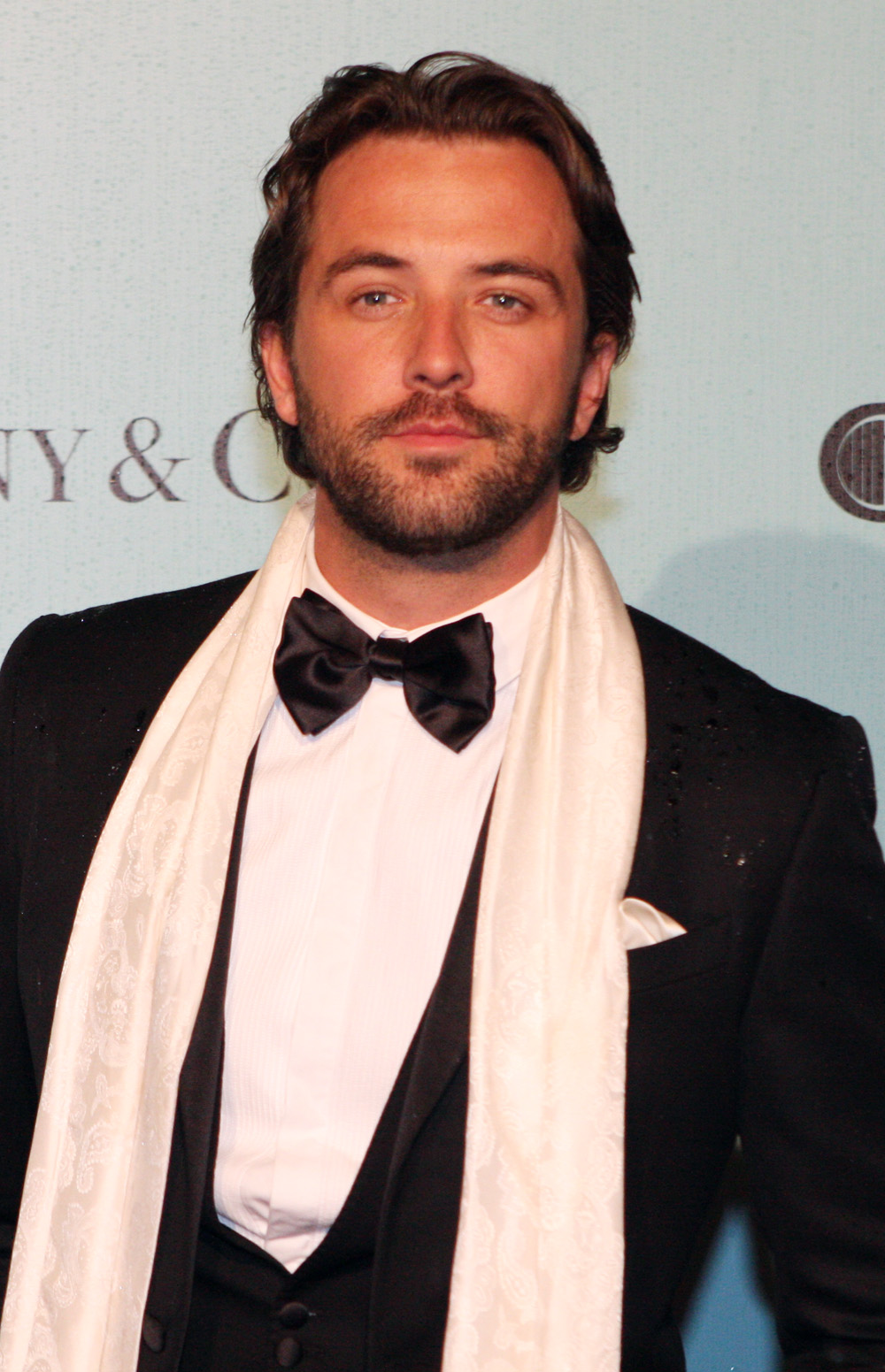
Darren McMullen (main)

Season 1 coaches Delta Goodrem, Joel Madden and Seal returned. It was announced in September 2012 that Keith Urban would not be returning as a coach for the second season, after accepting an offer to join the American Idol judging panel. Following an extensive search process by producers, and constant media speculation on who would replace Urban, Ricky Martin was officially announced as the new coach in November 2012. In response to joining the series, Martin paid tribute to Urban saying he was "humbled to be sitting in his chair". Nine's Director of Television, Michael Healy stated that Martin would bring "huge experience" and be the "perfect addition" to the coaching panel, with Goodrem, Madden and Seal all publicly expressing excitement at the news via their Twitter accounts.

Mentors for the second season were announced on 1 March 2013 as Ryan Tedder, Jessica Mauboy, Ben Lee and Connie Mitchell, who teamed up with Goodrem, Martin, Madden and Seal respectively.

Darren McMullen returned as host for the second season, while Faustina Agolley also returned as social media correspondent.

== Teams ==
Color key

- Winner
- Runner-up
- Third place
- Fourth place
- Eliminated in Live shows
- Eliminated in Showdown Rounds
- Eliminated in Battle Rounds
- Saved by another coach in battle rounds

Coach	Top 56				
Seal					
Seal	Harrison Craig	Mitchell Anderson	Alex Gibson	Jac Stone	Shawne Kirke
Seal	Nicholas Roy	Michelle Martinez	Hannah Darling	Skye Elizabeth	Tim Moxey
Seal	Sarah Martin	Simone Stacey	Lauren Dawes	Ryan Sanders	~~Steve Clisby~~
Joel Madden					
Joel Madden	Danny Ross	Kiyomi Vella	Michael Stangel	Michael Paynter	Adam Garrett
Joel Madden	Lyric McFarland	Danni Hodson	Kathy Hinch	Jessika Samarges	Louise Roussety
Joel Madden	Maya Weiss	Chris Sheehy	Nick Stenmark	~~Hannah Darling~~	~~Emma Pask~~
Delta Goodrem					
Delta Goodrem	Celia Pavey	Steve Clisby	Jackie Sannia	Tim Morrison	Ben Goldstein
Delta Goodrem	Rob Edwards	Josh Kyle	Nathan Allgood	Sophie Phillis	Anna Weatherup
Delta Goodrem	Jenna Dearness-Dark	Mitchell Steele	Oscar Chavez	Luke Mansini	~~Michael Stangel~~
Ricky Martin					
Ricky Martin	Luke Kennedy	Miss Murphy	Simon Meli	Caterina Torres	Emma Pask
Ricky Martin	James Walker	Imogen Brough	Nick Kingswell	Katie Carr	Katie Reeve
Ricky Martin	Belinda Adams	Bec & Sebastian	Kaity Dunstan	Sione Felila	Juliane Di Sisto
Note: Italicized names denote "stolen" contestants within their new teams (names struck through on their original teams).

== Blind auditions ==
=== Episode 1 (7 April) ===
The first episode of the Blind Auditions was broadcast on 7 April 2013. The coaches performed a cover of "Diamonds" together at the start of the show.

Key	Coach presses his or her button	Contestant eliminated with no coach pressing his or her button	Contestant received an All Turn	Contestant defaulted to this coach's team	Contestant elected to join this coach's team

Order	Contestant	Song	Coach's and contestant's choices			
Order	Contestant	Song	Seal	Joel	Delta	Ricky
1	Kaity Dunstan _{16, from VIC}	"Brand New Key"				
2	Nathan Allgood _{20, from NSW}	"A House Is Not a Home"	—			
3	Simon Meli _{35, from NSW}	"Ramble On"				
4	Celia Pavey _{19, from NSW}	"Scarborough Fair/Canticle"				
5	Evan Moring _{27, from NSW}	"How Deep Is Your Love"	—	—	—	—
6	Alex Gibson _{26, from ACT}	"Blackbird"			—	—
7	Lara Parker-Kent _{29, from NSW}	"Livin' on a Prayer"	—	—	—	—
8	Lyric McFarland _{28, from NSW}	"Shy Guy"				

Celia Pavey and Kaity Dunstan both entered the ARIA Singles Charts after their performances at No. 27 and No. 40 respectively.

=== Episode 2 (8 April) ===
The second episode of the Blind Auditions was broadcast on 8 April 2013.

Key	Coach presses his or her button	Contestant eliminated with no coach pressing his or her button	Contestant received an All Turn	Contestant defaulted to this coach's team	Contestant elected to join this coach's team

Order	Contestant	Song	Coach's and contestant's choices			
Order	Contestant	Song	Seal	Joel	Delta	Ricky
1	Danni Hodson _{20, from NSW}	"Something's Got a Hold on Me"				
2	Mark Stefanoff _{21, from SA}	"This Is the Moment"	—	—	—	—
3	Ryan Sanders _{19, from Manchester, UK / now NSW}	"Brother"				—
4	Skye Elisabeth _{26, from SA / now NSW}	"Put Your Records On"			—	—
5	Anna Weatherup _{30, from NSW}	"Fields of Gold"				
6	Nick Kingswell _{26, from NSW}	"I Need a Dollar"	—	—	—	
7	Emma Pask _{35, from NSW}	"Blue Skies"	—		—	—
8	Tib Horvath _{45, from SA}	"Are You Gonna Be My Girl"	—	—	—	—
9	Harrison Craig _{18, from VIC}	"Broken Vow"				

Harrison Craig entered the ARIA Singles Charts after his performance at No. 18.

=== Episode 3 (9 April) ===
The third episode of the Blind Auditions was broadcast on 9 April 2013.

Key	Coach presses his or her button	Contestant eliminated with no coach pressing his or her button	Contestant received an All Turn	Contestant defaulted to this coach's team	Contestant elected to join this coach's team

Order	Contestant	Song	Coach's and contestant's choices			
Order	Contestant	Song	Seal	Joel	Delta	Ricky
1	Belinda Adams _{39, from NSW}	"I Am Changing"				
2	Danny Ross _{30, from NSW}	"When the Levee Breaks"			—	—
3	Rien Low _{34, from VIC}	"Never Say Never"	—	—	—	—
4	Bec & Sebastian (Bec and Sebastian Ivanov) _{29, from VIC}	"Nobody's Perfect"	—	—	—	
5	Jenna Dearness-Dark _{16, from QLD}	"Pie Jesu"				
6	Steve Clisby _{67, from Los Angeles / now NSW}	"Can't Get Enough of Your Love, Babe"			—	—
7	Oscar Chavez _{27, from NSW}	"Bed of Roses"	—	—		—
8	Georgia Carey _{18, from SA}	"Kiss Me"	—	—	—	—
9	Sarah Martin _{29, from VIC}	"Woman"				—
10	James Napier _{36, from NSW}	"Wade in the Water"	—	—	—	—

=== Episode 4 (10 April) ===
The fourth episode of the Blind Auditions was broadcast on 10 April 2013.

Key	Coach presses his or her button	Contestant eliminated with no coach pressing his or her button	Contestant received an All Turn	Contestant defaulted to this coach's team	Contestant elected to join this coach's team

Order	Contestant	Song	Coach's and contestant's choices			
Order	Contestant	Song	Seal	Joel	Delta	Ricky
1	Kathy Hinch (Note: Contestant Kathy Hinch's blind audition was featured in the third episode, but the outcome wasn't revealed until the following episode.) _{25, from VIC}	"Girl on Fire"	—		—	
2	Glen Percival _{34, from VIC}	"Times Like These"	—	—	—	—
3	Maya Weiss _{18, from VIC}	"Stepping Stone"			—	—
4	Tim Morrison _{32, from VIC}	"Sunday Bloody Sunday"		—		—
5	Michelle Cashman _{30, from NSW}	"Wicked Game"	—	—	—	—
6	Jessika Samarges _{20, from VIC}	"Stuck"				—
7	Kim Sheehy _{25, from QLD}	"Love Song"	—	—	—	—
8	Chris Sheehy _{22, from QLD}	"One More Night"				—
9	Juliane Di Sisto _{29, from TAS}	"Good Luck"	—	—	—	
10	Luke Kennedy _{30, from QLD}	"Un giorno per noi (A Time for Us)"				

- There was an error with the chairs during Kathy Hinch's audition because they wouldn't turn when they pressed it. The error was later fixed at the end of her audition still making her through to the show

=== Episode 5 (14 April) ===
The fifth episode of the Blind Auditions was broadcast on 14 April 2013.

Key	Coach presses his or her button	Contestant eliminated with no coach pressing his or her button	Contestant received an All Turn	Contestant defaulted to this coach's team	Contestant elected to join this coach's team

Order	Contestant	Song	Coach's and contestant's choices			
Order	Contestant	Song	Seal	Joel	Delta	Ricky
1	Nicholas Roy _{32, from VIC}	"Falling Slowly"				
2	Katie Reeve _{26, from NSW}	"Piece of My Heart"	—	—		
3	Josh Kyle _{26, from VIC}	"Fragile"	—	—		
4	Karen Andrews ("Miss Murphy") _{31, from NSW}	"I'd Rather Go Blind"				
5	Marisa Quigley _{39, from VIC}	"We're All Gonna Die Someday"	—	—	—	—
6	Nick Stenmark _{28, from NSW}	"I Will Wait"	—		—	—
7	Viva Lale _{26, from QLD}	"One Sweet Day"	—	—	—	—
8	Atlanta Coogan _{36, from VIC}	"Son of a Preacher Man"	—	—	—	—
9	Caterina Torres _{22, from VIC}	"Hot Right Now"				

=== Episode 6 (15 April) ===
The sixth episode of the Blind Auditions was broadcast on 15 April 2013.

Key	Coach presses his or her button	Contestant eliminated with no coach pressing his or her button	Contestant received an All Turn	Contestant defaulted to this coach's team	Contestant elected to join this coach's team

Order	Contestant	Song	Coach's and contestant's choices			
Order	Contestant	Song	Seal	Joel	Delta	Ricky
1	Rebekah Davis _{23, from QLD / now VIC}	"Not Me, Not I"	—	—	—	—
2	Michael Paynter _{27, from VIC}	"Somewhere Only We Know"				+
3	Wade Smith _{17, from NSW}	"Fast Car"	—	—	—	—
4	Sophie Phillis _{26, from QLD}	"Beautiful Disaster"		—		
5	Steve Wade _{51, from VIC}	"The Boys of Summer"	—	—	—	—
6	Tim Moxey _{27, from NSW}	"I Want to Know What Love Is"			—	—
7	Mitchell Steele _{21, from QLD}	"One and Only"		—		—
8	Jake Edgley _{25, from NSW}	"So Beautiful"	—	—	—	—
9	Imogen Brough _{21, from VIC}	"Never Let Me Go"				

+Delta pressed Ricky's button

Imogen Brough entered the ARIA Singles Charts following her performance, at No. 43.

=== Episode 7 (16 April) ===
The seventh episode of the Blind Auditions was broadcast on 16 April 2013.

Key	Coach presses his or her button	Contestant eliminated with no coach pressing his or her button	Contestant received an All Turn	Contestant defaulted to this coach's team	Contestant elected to join this coach's team

Order	Contestant	Song	Coach's and contestant's choices			
Order	Contestant	Song	Seal	Joel	Delta	Ricky
1	Hannah Darling _{21, from NSW}	"Ghosts"			—	—
2	Ben Goldstein _{20, from NSW}	"Bedouin Song"		—		—
3	Rebekah Strongman _{17, from VIC}	"Next to Me"	—	—	—	—
4	Jackie Sannia _{17, from VIC}	"People Help the People"				—
5	Emma & Sarah Linnegar _{23, from NSW}	"Runaway"	—	—	—	—
6	Mitchell Anderson _{44, from NSW}	"Sexual Healing"		—	—	—
7	Katie Carr _{26, from NSW}	"Who You Are"	—	—	—	
8	Luke Mansini _{26, from QLD}	"Hometown Glory"		—		—
9	Shawne Kirke _{28, from WA}	"You Give Me Something"			—	—

=== Episode 8 (21 April) ===
The eighth episode of the Blind Auditions was broadcast on 21 April 2013.

Key	Coach presses his or her button	Contestant eliminated with no coach pressing his or her button	Contestant received an All Turn	Contestant defaulted to this coach's team	Contestant elected to join this coach's team

Order	Contestant	Song	Coach's and contestant's choices			
Order	Contestant	Song	Seal	Joel	Delta	Ricky
1	Abby Dobson _{44, from NSW}	"Do Right Woman, Do Right Man"	—	—	—	—
2	Michelle Martinez _{28, from NSW}	"Lady Marmalade"				—
3	Eske Ozdemir _{18, from NSW}	"So Sick"	—	—	—	—
4	Sione Felila _{25, from NSW}	"You to Me Are Everything"	—	—	—	
5	Kiyomi Vella _{19, from VIC}	"1234"			—	—
6	Louise Roussety _{29, from VIC}	"Creep"	—		—	—
7	Vanessa Raspa _{28, from WA / now NSW}	"These Boots Are Made for Walkin'"	—	—	—	—
8	Rob Edwards _{35, from NSW}	"Seven Nation Army"				—
9	James Walker _{19, from QLD}	"One Crowded Hour"	—	—	—	
10	Lauren Dawes _{28, from NSW}	"Is This Love"		—	—	Team Full

=== Episode 9 (22 April) ===
The ninth and final episode of the Blind Auditions was broadcast on 22 April 2013.

Key	Coach presses his or her button	Contestant eliminated with no coach pressing his or her button	Contestant received an All Turn	Contestant defaulted to this coach's team	Contestant elected to join this coach's team

Order	Contestant	Song	Coach's and contestant's choices			
Order	Contestant	Song	Seal	Joel	Delta	Ricky
1	Andy Sellars _{28, from SA}	"Across the Universe"	—	—	—	Team Full
2	Simone Stacey _{35, from QLD}	"(I Love You) For Sentimental Reasons"				Team Full
3	Garth Ploog _{27, from VIC}	"Everything"	—	—	—	Team Full
4	Sarah Carnegie _{32, from VIC}	"You Oughta Know"	—	—	—	Team Full
5	Michael Stangel _{45, from VIC}	"Bow River"	—	—		Team Full
6	Louise Anton _{46, from WA}	"Maybe I'm Amazed"	—	—	—N/a	Team Full
7	Adam Garrett _{23, from WA}	"Skinny Love"	—		—N/a	Team Full
8	Tyler Azzopardi _{23, from NSW}	"Gotta Get Thru This"	—	—N/a	—N/a	Team Full
9	Jac Stone _{23, from QLD}	"Watch Over Me"		—N/a	—N/a	Team Full

== Battle rounds ==
=== Episode 1 (23 April) ===
The first episode of the Battle Rounds was broadcast on 23 April 2013.

– Contestant wins battle round/advances to showdown
– Contestant loses battle round but gets saved/advances
– Contestant loses battle round and is eliminated

Episode/ Order	Coach	Winner	Song	Loser	'Save' result			
Episode/ Order	Coach	Winner	Song	Loser	Seal	Joel	Delta	Ricky
1.1	Delta Goodrem	Celia Pavey	"A Thousand Years"	Anna Weatherup	—	—	—N/a	—
1.2	Joel Madden	Michael Paynter	"As Long as You Love Me"	Louise Roussety	—	—N/a	—	—
1.3	Delta Goodrem	Rob Edwards	"Have a Little Faith in Me"	Michael Stangel	✔	✔	—N/a	✔
1.4	Seal	Alex Gibson	"Skyfall"	Skye Elizabeth	—N/a	Save Used	—	—
1.5	Ricky Martin	Caterina Torres	"Try"	Katie Reeve	—	Save Used	—	—N/a
1.6	Seal	Harrison Craig	"You Raise Me Up"	Tim Moxey	—N/a	Save Used	—	—

Celia Pavey and Harrison Craig both entered the ARIA Singles Charts after their performances at No. 33 and No. 40 respectively. Celia rose to No. 23 the week later.

=== Episode 2 (28 April) ===
The second episode of the Battle Rounds was broadcast on 28 April 2013.

– Contestant wins battle round/advances to showdown
– Contestant loses battle round but gets saved/advances
– Contestant loses battle round and is eliminated

Episode/ Order	Coach	Winner	Song	Loser	'Save' result			
Episode/ Order	Coach	Winner	Song	Loser	Seal	Joel	Delta	Ricky
2.1	Ricky Martin	Luke Kennedy	"I Dreamed a Dream"	Belinda Adams	—	Save Used	—	—N/a
2.2	Joel Madden	Kiyomi Vella	"Human"	Maya Weiss	—	Save Used	—	—
2.3	Seal	Shawne Kirke	"Love Rears Its Ugly Head"	Sarah Martin	—N/a	Save Used	—	—
2.4	Ricky Martin	James Walker	"Semi-Charmed Life"	Bec & Sebastian Ivanov	—	Save Used	—	—N/a
2.5	Joel Madden	Lyric McFarland	"What a Wonderful World"	Emma Pask	—	Save Used	—	✔
2.6	Ricky Martin	Nick Kingswell	"Girls Just Wanna Have Fun"	Kaity Dunstan	—	Save Used	—	Save Used
2.7	Delta Goodrem	Jackie Sannia	"My Immortal"	Jenna Dearness-Dark	—	Save Used	—N/a	Save Used
2.8	Joel Madden	Danni Hodson	"Some Nights"	Hannah Darling	✔	Save Used	—	Save Used

=== Episode 3 (29 April) ===
The third episode of the Battle Rounds was broadcast on 29 April 2013.

– Contestant wins battle round/advances to showdown
– Contestant loses battle round but gets saved/advances
– Contestant loses battle round and is eliminated

Episode/ Order	Coach	Winner	Song	Loser	'Save' result			
Episode/ Order	Coach	Winner	Song	Loser	Seal	Joel	Delta	Ricky
3.1	Seal	Michelle Martinez	"Battlefield"	Simone Stacey	Save Used	Save Used	—	Save Used
3.2	Joel Madden	Danny Ross	"Are You Gonna Go My Way"	Chris Sheehy	Save Used	Save Used	—	Save Used
3.3	Ricky Martin	Miss Murphy	"People Get Ready"	Sione Felila	Save Used	Save Used	—	Save Used
3.4	Delta Goodrem	Ben Goldstein	"Give Me Love"	Mitchell Steele	Save Used	Save Used	N/A	Save Used
3.5	Delta Goodrem	Tim Morrison	"Lanterns"	Oscar Chavez	Save Used	Save Used	N/A	Save Used
3.6	Seal	Jac Stone	"You Don't Know Me"	Lauren Dawes	Save Used	Save Used	—	Save Used
3.7	Ricky Martin	Simon Meli	"Hard To Handle"	Juliane Di Sisto	Save Used	Save Used	—	Save Used

=== Episode 4 (30 April) ===
The fourth and final episode of the Battle Rounds was broadcast on 30 April 2013.

– Contestant wins battle round/advances to showdown
– Contestant loses battle round but gets saved/advances
– Contestant loses battle round and is eliminated

Episode/ Order	Coach	Winner	Song	Loser	'Save' result			
Episode/ Order	Coach	Winner	Song	Loser	Seal	Joel	Delta	Ricky
4.1	Seal	Nicholas Roy	"You Found Me"	Ryan Sanders	Save Used	Save Used	—	Save Used
4.2	Delta Goodrem	Nathan Allgood	"Stay"	Sophie Phillis	Save Used	Save Used	—N/a	Save Used
4.3	Joel Madden	Kathy Hinch	"Titanium"	Jessika Samarges	Save Used	Save Used	—	Save Used
4.4	Delta Goodrem	Josh Kyle	"Hearts a Mess"	Luke Mansini	Save Used	Save Used	—N/a	Save Used
4.5	Joel Madden	Adam Garrett	"Don't You Worry Child"	Nick Stenmark	Save Used	Save Used	—	Save Used
4.6	Seal	Mitchell Anderson	"Walking in Memphis"	Steve Clisby	Save Used	Save Used	✔	Save Used
4.7	Ricky Martin	Imogen Brough	"She Wolf"	Katie Carr	Save Used	Save Used	Save Used	Save Used

Mitchell Anderson and Steve Clisby both entered the ARIA Singles Charts after their performances at No. 62 and No. 72 respectively. Steve rose to No. 60 the week later

== Showdown rounds ==
=== Week 1 (5–7 May) ===
5 May

The first episode of the Showdowns was broadcast on 5 May 2013.

– Contestant saved by the voters at home
– Contestant was in the bottom 3 and was sent to the sing-off
– Contestant received the fewest votes and was instantly eliminated

Order	Coach	Contestant	Song	Result
1.1	Ricky Martin	Simon Meli	"Hold On, I'm A Comin'"	Sing-off
1.2	Ricky Martin	Imogen Brough	"The Voice"	Eliminated
1.3	Ricky Martin	Nick Kingswell	"Army of Two"	Sing-off
1.4	Ricky Martin	Miss Murphy	"Sorry Seems to Be the Hardest Word"	Saved by public
1.5	Seal	Michelle Martinez	"Dedication to My Ex"	Sing-off
1.6	Seal	Alex Gibson	"The Sound of Silence"	Sing-off
1.7	Seal	Hannah Darling	"Linger"	Eliminated
1.8	Seal	Harrison Craig	"Home"	Saved by public

Harrison Craig, Miss Murphy, Alex Gibson and Michelle Martinez entered the ARIA Singles Charts after their performances at No. 13, No. 30, No. 49 and No. 87 respectively.

6 May

The second episode of the Showdowns was broadcast on 6 May 2013.

– Contestant saved by the voters at home
– Contestant was in the bottom 3 and was sent to the sing-off
– Contestant received the fewest votes and was instantly eliminated

Order	Coach	Contestant	Song	Result
2.1	Delta Goodrem	Rob Edwards	"Impossible"	Sing-off
2.2	Delta Goodrem	Jackie Sannia	"Arithmetic"	Sing-off
2.3	Delta Goodrem	Josh Kyle	"Settle Down"	Eliminated
2.4	Delta Goodrem	Steve Clisby	"God Bless The Child"	Saved by public
2.5	Joel Madden	Danni Hodson	"Stronger"	Eliminated
2.6	Joel Madden	Adam Garrett	"Animal"	Sing-off
2.7	Joel Madden	Kiyomi Vella	"Upside Down"	Sing-off
2.8	Joel Madden	Michael Paynter	"The Horses"	Saved by public

Jackie Sannia, Steve Clisby, Michael Paynter and Kiyomi Vella entered the ARIA Singles Charts after their performances at No. 24, No. 31, No. 34 and No. 48 respectively.

7 May

The first episode of the Live shows was broadcast on 7 May 2013.

Sing-off performances

Contestant was saved by the coach
Contestant was eliminated

Order	Coach	Contestant	Song	Result
1.1	Seal	Alex Gibson	"Blackbird"	Saved
1.2	Seal	Michelle Martinez	"Lady Marmalade"	Eliminated
2.1	Ricky Martin	Simon Meli	"Ramble On"	Saved
2.2	Ricky Martin	Nick Kingswell	"I Need a Dollar"	Eliminated
3.1	Delta Goodrem	Jackie Sannia	"People Help the People"	Saved
3.2	Delta Goodrem	Rob Edwards	"Seven Nation Army"	Eliminated
4.1	Joel Madden	Adam Garrett	"Skinny Love"	Eliminated
4.2	Joel Madden	Kiyomi Vella	"1234"	Saved

- Guest Performance: will.i.am – #thatpower

=== Week 2 (12–14 May) ===
12 May

The third episode of the Showdowns was broadcast on 12 May 2013.

– Contestant saved by the voters at home
– Contestant was in the bottom 3 and was sent to the sing-off
– Contestant received the fewest votes and was instantly eliminated

Order	Coach	Contestant	Song	Result
1.1	Seal	Mitchell Anderson	"The Letter"	Saved by public
1.2	Seal	Nicholas Roy	"Last Goodbye"	Eliminated
1.3	Seal	Jac Stone	"Luka"	Sing-off
1.4	Seal	Shawne Kirke	"Last Request"	Sing-off
1.5	Ricky Martin	Caterina Torres	"If I Were a Boy"	Sing-off
1.6	Ricky Martin	James Walker	"Mr. Brightside"	Eliminated
1.7	Ricky Martin	Emma Pask	"Mas que Nada"	Sing-off
1.8	Ricky Martin	Luke Kennedy	"Con te partirò"	Saved by public

Luke Kennedy, Emma Pask, Caterina Torres, Mitchell Anderson and Jac Stone entered the ARIA Singles Charts after their performances at No. 8, No. 15, No. 28, No. 88 and No. 92 respectively.

13 May

The fourth episode of the Showdowns was broadcast on 13 May 2013.

– Contestant saved by the voters at home
– Contestant was in the bottom 3 and was sent to the sing-off
– Contestant received the fewest votes and was instantly eliminated

Order	Coach	Contestant	Song	Result
1.1	Delta Goodrem	Celia Pavey	"Woodstock"	Saved by public
1.2	Delta Goodrem	Tim Morrison	Learn to Fly	Sing-off
1.3	Delta Goodrem	Nathan Allgood	"When I Was Your Man"	Eliminated
1.4	Delta Goodrem	Ben Goldstein	"Waiting in Vain"	Sing-off
1.5	Joel Madden	Michael Stangel	"Home"	Saved by public
1.6	Joel Madden	Kathy Hinch	"Bleeding Love"	Eliminated
1.7	Joel Madden	Lyric McFarland	"Let's Stay Together"	Sing-off
1.8	Joel Madden	Danny Ross	"All Along the Watchtower"	Sing-off

Celia Pavey, Michael Stangel, Lyric McFarland and Danny Ross entered the ARIA Singles Charts after their performances at No. 29, No. 41, No. 51, and No. 93 respectively.

14 May

The second episode of the Live shows was broadcast on 14 May 2013.

Sing-off performances

Contestant was saved by the coach
Contestant was eliminated

Order	Coach	Contestant	Song	Result
1.1	Joel Madden	Lyric McFarland	"Shy Guy"	Eliminated
1.2	Joel Madden	Danny Ross	"When the Levee Breaks"	Saved
2.1	Delta Goodrem	Ben Goldstein	"Bedouin Song"	Eliminated
2.2	Delta Goodrem	Tim Morrison	"Sunday Bloody Sunday"	Saved
3.1	Seal	Jac Stone	"Watch Over Me"	Saved
3.2	Seal	Shawne Kirke	"You Give Me Something"	Eliminated
4.1	Ricky Martin	Emma Pask	"Blue Skies"	Eliminated
4.2	Ricky Martin	Caterina Torres	"Hot Right Now"	Saved

- Guest Performance: The Wanted – Walks Like Rihanna

== Live Finals ==
=== Episode 20 (20 May) ===
The first episode of the Live shows was broadcast on 20 May 2013.

– Contestant saved by the voters at home
– Contestant was sent through by the coach before votings
– Contestant received the fewest votes and was instantly eliminated

Order	Coach	Contestant	Song	Result
1.1	Joel Madden	Michael Paynter	"Locked Out of Heaven"	Eliminated
1.2	Joel Madden	Michael Stangel	"Four Walls"	Saved by public
1.3	Joel Madden	Danny Ross	"The Joker"	Saved by coach
1.4	Joel Madden	Kiyomi Vella	"It's Oh So Quiet"	Saved by public
1.5	Seal	Mitchell Anderson	"Dear Prudence"	Saved by public
1.6	Seal	Alex Gibson	"Folsom Prison Blues"	Saved by coach
1.7	Seal	Jac Stone	"Uninvited"	Eliminated
1.8	Seal	Harrison Craig	"Can't Help Falling in Love"	Saved by public
1.9	Delta Goodrem	Tim Morrison	"Something"	Eliminated
1.10	Delta Goodrem	Celia Pavey	"Jolene"	Saved by public
1.11	Delta Goodrem	Jackie Sannia	"Skyscraper"	Saved by public
1.12	Delta Goodrem	Steve Clisby	"Just The Two of Us"	Saved by coach
1.13	Ricky Martin	Simon Meli	"Sympathy for the Devil"	Saved by public
1.14	Ricky Martin	Caterina Torres	"Love Don't Cost A Thing"	Eliminated
1.15	Ricky Martin	Miss Murphy	"1+1"	Saved by public
1.16	Ricky Martin	Luke Kennedy	"Please Don't Ask Me"	Saved by coach

Harrison Craig (No. 6), Luke Kennedy (No. 11), Celia Pavey (No. 15), Kiyomi Vella (No. 45), Miss Murphy (No. 49), Jackie Sannia (No. 65), Jac Stone (No. 76), Mitchell Anderson (No. 79), Michael Paynter (No. 80), Michael Stangel (No. 82), Simon Meli (No. 86) and Steve Clisby (No. 89) entered the ARIA Singles Charts after their performances.

=== Episode 21 (27 May) ===
The second episode of the Live shows was broadcast on 27 May 2013.

– Contestant saved by the voters at home
– Contestant was chosen by the coach
– Contestant was not chosen by the coach

Order	Coach	Contestant	Song	Result
1.1	Ricky Martin	Luke Kennedy	"Freedom 90"	Saved by public
1.2	Delta Goodrem	Steve Clisby	"New York State of Mind"	Saved by coach
1.3	Seal	Alex Gibson	"Sweet Disposition"	Eliminated
1.4	Joel Madden	Danny Ross	"Old Man"	Saved by public
1.5	Ricky Martin	Miss Murphy	"Killing Me Softly"	Saved by coach
1.6	Joel Madden	Michael Stangel	"Everybody Hurts"	Eliminated
1.7	Delta Goodrem	Celia Pavey	"Edelweiss"	Saved by public
1.8	Joel Madden	Kiyomi Vella	"Young Blood"	Saved by coach
1.9	Seal	Mitchell Anderson	"What Becomes of the Brokenhearted"	Saved by coach
1.10	Delta Goodrem	Jackie Sannia	"Smoke"	Eliminated
1.11	Ricky Martin	Simon Meli	"Tiny Dancer"	Eliminated
1.12	Seal	Harrison Craig	"It Had Better Be Tonight"	Saved by public

- Guest Performance: Gurrumul Yunupingu and Delta Goodrem – Bayini

Harrison Craig (No. 12), Celia Pavey (No. 23), Luke Kennedy (No. 25), Miss Murphy (No. 30), Danny Ross (No. 33), Jackie Sannia (No. 42), Steve Clisby (No. 49), Mitchell Anderson (No. 54), Kiyomi Vella (No. 58), Michael Stangel (No. 65) entered the ARIA Singles Charts after their performances.

=== Episode 22 (3 June) ===
The third episode of the Live shows was broadcast on 3 June 2013.

– Contestant saved by the voters at home
– Contestant received the fewest votes and was eliminated

Order	Coach	Contestant	Song	Result
1.1	Seal	Harrison Craig	"If"	Advanced
1.2	Ricky Martin	Miss Murphy	"You've Really Got a Hold on Me"	Eliminated
1.3	Joel Madden	Danny Ross	"It's Time"	Advanced
1.4	Delta Goodrem	Steve Clisby	"Sunday in Savannah"	Eliminated
1.5	Joel Madden	Kiyomi Vella	"Pack Up"	Eliminated
1.6	Seal	Mitchell Anderson	"Take Me to the River"	Eliminated
1.7	Ricky Martin	Luke Kennedy	"Overjoyed"	Advanced
1.8	Delta Goodrem	Celia Pavey	"Will You Love Me Tomorrow"	Advanced

- Guest Performance: Karise Eden – Threads of Silence

Celia Pavey (No. 23), Harrison Craig (No. 24), Miss Murphy (No. 32), Luke Kennedy (No. 35), Steve Clisby (No. 49), Kiyomi Vella (No. 59), Danny Ross (No. 69), Mitchell Anderson (No. 83) entered the ARIA Singles Charts after their performances.

== Semi-finals ==
=== Episode 23 (10 June) ===
The fourth episode of the Live shows was broadcast on 10 June 2013.

– Contestant saved by the voters at home
– Contestant received the fewest votes and was eliminated
– Winner
– Runner-up
– Third place
– Fourth place

Order	Coach	Contestant	Song	Result
1.1	Delta Goodrem	Celia Pavey	"Xanadu"	Advanced
1.2	Delta Goodrem	Steve Clisby	"Change the World"	Eliminated
1.3	Seal	Harrison Craig	"Unchained Melody"	Advanced
1.4	Seal	Mitchell Anderson	"To Love Somebody"	Eliminated
1.5	Joel Madden	Kiyomi Vella	"Running Up That Hill"	Eliminated
1.6	Joel Madden	Danny Ross	"Let Her Go"	Advanced
1.7	Ricky Martin	Miss Murphy	"Love Don't Live Here Anymore"	Eliminated
1.8	Ricky Martin	Luke Kennedy	"Caruso"	Advanced
1.9	Ricky Martin	Luke Kennedy	"Love Is Gone"	Runner-up
1.10	Delta Goodrem	Celia Pavey	"Candle in the Night"	Third place
1.11	Joel Madden	Danny Ross	"Windmill"	Fourth place
1.12	Seal	Harrison Craig	"More Than a Dream"	Winner

Harrison Craig's Unchained Melody (No. 2) and More Than a Dream (No. 3), Luke Kennedy's Love Is Gone (No. 22) and Caruso (No. 23), Celia Pavey's Candle in the Night (No. 32) and Xanadu (No. 73) and Danny Ross's Let Her Go (No. 78) and Windmill (No. 89) entered the ARIA Singles Charts after their performances.

Coach and Group performances

Performer(s)	Song
Seal, Joel Madden, Delta Goodrem and Ricky Martin	"Livin' la Vida Loca"

- Guest Performance: Timomatic – Parachute

== Grand final ==
=== Episode 24 (17 June) ===
The Grand Final was broadcast on 17 June 2013.

Performer(s)	Song
Harrison Craig, Danny Ross, Luke Kennedy and Celia Pavey	"You're the Voice"
Danny Ross and Joel Madden	"Pompeii"
Luke Kennedy and Ricky Martin	"El Tango De Roxanne"
OneRepublic	"Counting Stars"
Celia Pavey and Delta Goodrem	"Go Your Own Way"
Robin Thicke	"Blurred Lines"
Harrison Craig and Seal	"He Ain't Heavy, He's My Brother"
Delta Goodrem	"Heart Hypnotic"
Ricky Martin	"Come With Me"

Winner

Harrison Craig

Song

"Unconditional"

== Results summary ==
=== Team Seal ===
Colour key

–	Artist was chosen by the public to go through
–	Artist was chosen by the coach to go through
–	Artist did not perform that week
–	Artist was saved from another coach's team
–	Artist moved to another coach's team due to save

Artist	Battles	Top 8.1	Top 8.3	Top 4	Top 3	Top 2	Finale
Harrison Craig	Advanced	Advanced	—	Advanced	Advanced	Advanced	Winner
Mitchell Anderson	Advanced	—	Advanced	Advanced	Advanced	Eliminated (Semi-finals)	
Alex Gibson	Advanced	Advanced	—	Advanced	Eliminated (Live Finals 2)		
Jac Stone	Advanced	—	Advanced	Eliminated (Live Finals 1)			
Shawne Kirke	Advanced	—	Eliminated (Showdown – Judge)				
Nicholas Roy	Advanced	—	Eliminated (Showdown – Voting)				
Michelle Martinez	Advanced	Eliminated (Showdown – Judge)					
Hannah Darling	Saved (Battles)	Eliminated (Showdown – Voting)					
~~Steve Clisby~~	Saved by Delta (Battles)						
Lauren Dawes	Eliminated (Battles)						
Ryan Sanders	Eliminated (Battles)						
Sarah Martin	Eliminated (Battles)						
Simone Stacey	Eliminated (Battles)						
Skye Elizabeth	Eliminated (Battles)						
Tim Moxey	Eliminated (Battles)						

=== Team Joel ===
Colour key

–	Artist was chosen by the public to go through
–	Artist was chosen by the coach to go through
–	Artist did not perform that week
–	Artist was saved from another coach's team
–	Artist moved to another coach's team due to save

Artist	Battles	Top 8.2	Top 8.4	Top 4	Top 3	Top 2	Finale
Danny Ross	Advanced	—	Advanced	Advanced	Advanced	Advanced	Fourth place
Kiyomi Vella	Advanced	Advanced	—	Advanced	Advanced	Eliminated (Semi-finals)	
Michael Stangel	Saved (Battles)	—	Advanced	Advanced	Eliminated (Live Finals 2)		
Michael Paynter	Advanced	Advanced	—	Eliminated (Live Finals 1)			
Lyric McFarland	Advanced	—	Eliminated (Showdown – Judge)				
Kathy Hinch	Advanced	—	Eliminated (Showdown – Voting)				
Adam Garrett	Advanced	Eliminated (Showdown – Judge)					
Danni Hodson	Advanced	Eliminated (Showdown – Voting)					
~~Emma Pask~~	Saved by Ricky (Battles)						
~~Hannah Darling~~	Saved by Seal (Battles)						
Chris Sheehy	Eliminated (Battles)						
Jessika Samarges	Eliminated (Battles)						
Louise Roussety	Eliminated (Battles)						
Maya Weiss	Eliminated (Battles)						
Nick Stenmark	Eliminated (Battles)						

=== Team Delta ===
Colour key

–	Artist was chosen by the public to go through
–	Artist was chosen by the coach to go through
–	Artist did not perform that week
–	Artist was saved from another coach's team
–	Artist moved to another coach's team due to save

Artist	Battles	Top 8.2	Top 8.4	Top 4	Top 3	Top 2	Finale
Celia Pavey	Advanced	—	Advanced	Advanced	Advanced	Advanced	Third place
Steve Clisby	Saved (Battles)	Advanced	—	Advanced	Advanced	Eliminated (Semi-finals)	
Jackie Sannia	Advanced	Advanced	—	Advanced	Eliminated (Live Finals 2)		
Tim Morrison	Advanced	—	Advanced	Eliminated (Live Finals 1)			
Ben Goldstein	Advanced	—	Eliminated (Showdown – Judge)				
Nathan Allgood	Advanced	—	Eliminated (Showdown – Voting)				
Rob Edwards	Advanced	Eliminated (Showdown – Judge)					
Josh Kyle	Advanced	Eliminated (Showdown – Voting)					
~~Michael Stangel~~	Saved by Joel (Battles)						
Anna Weatherup	Eliminated (Battles)						
Jenna Dearness-Dark	Eliminated (Battles)						
Luke Mansini	Eliminated (Battles)						
Mitchell Steele	Eliminated (Battles)						
Oscar Chavez	Eliminated (Battles)						
Sophie Phillis	Eliminated (Battles)						

=== Team Ricky ===
Colour key

–	Artist was chosen by the public to go through
–	Artist was chosen by the coach to go through
–	Artist did not perform that week
–	Artist was saved from another coach's team
–	Artist moved to another coach's team due to save

Artist	Battles	Top 8.1	Top 8.3	Top 4	Top 3	Top 2	Finale
Luke Kennedy	Advanced	—	Advanced	Advanced	Advanced	Advanced	Runner-up
Miss Murphy	Advanced	Advanced	—	Advanced	Advanced	Eliminated (Semi-finals)	
Simon Meli	Advanced	Advanced	—	Advanced	Eliminated (Live Finals 2)		
Caterina Torres	Advanced	—	Advanced	Eliminated (Live Finals 1)			
Emma Pask	Saved (Battles)	—	Eliminated (Showdown – Judge)				
James Walker	Advanced	—	Eliminated (Showdown – Voting)				
Nick Kingswell	Advanced	Eliminated (Showdown – Judge)					
Imogen Brough	Advanced	Eliminated (Showdown – Voting)					
Bec & Sebastian Ivanov	Eliminated (Battles)						
Belinda Adams	Eliminated (Battles)						
Juliane Di Sisto	Eliminated (Battles)						
Kaity Dunstan	Eliminated (Battles)						
Katie Carr	Eliminated (Battles)						
Katie Reeve	Eliminated (Battles)						
Sione Felila	Eliminated (Battles)						

== Elimination Chart ==
=== Overall ===
Artist's info

- Artist from Team Seal
- Artist from Team Delta
- Artist from Team Joel
- Artist from Team Ricky

Result details

- Winner
- Runner-up
- Third place
- Fourth Place
- Artist was saved by the public
- Artist was saved by his/her coach
- Artist was eliminated

Live show results per week
Artist	Week 1	Week 2	Semi-Finals	Finals
Harrison Craig	Safe	Safe	Safe	Winner
Luke Kennedy	Safe	Safe	Safe	Runner-Up
Celia Pavey	Safe	Safe	Safe	3rd place
Danny Ross	Safe	Safe	Safe	4th place
Kiyomi Vella	Safe	Safe	Eliminated	Eliminated (Semi-Finals)
Miss Murphy	Safe	Safe	Eliminated	Eliminated (Semi-Finals)
Mitchell Anderson	Safe	Safe	Eliminated	Eliminated (Semi-Finals)
Steve Clisby	Safe	Safe	Eliminated	Eliminated (Semi-Finals)
Alex Gibson	Safe	Eliminated	Eliminated (Week 3)	
Jackie Sannia	Safe	Eliminated	Eliminated (Week 3)	
Michael Stangel	Safe	Eliminated	Eliminated (Week 3)	
Simon Meli	Safe	Eliminated	Eliminated (Week 3)	
Caterina Torres	Eliminated	Eliminated (Week 2)		
Jac Stone	Eliminated	Eliminated (Week 2)		
Michael Paynter	Eliminated	Eliminated (Week 2)		
Tim Morrison	Eliminated	Eliminated (Week 2)		

=== Artist's info ===
- Artist from Team Seal
- Artist from Team Joel
- Artist from Team Delta
- Artist from Team Ricky

Result details

- Winner
- Runner-up
- Third place
- Fourth Place
- Artist was eliminated

Live show results per week
Artist	Live Shows			The Live Finale
Artist	Week 1	Week 2	Week 3	The Live Finale
Harrison Craig	Public's vote	Advanced	Advanced	Winner
Mitchell Anderson	Public's vote	Advanced	Eliminated	
Alex Gibson	Coach's choice	Eliminated		
Jac Stone	Eliminated			
Danny Ross	Coach's choice	Advanced	Advanced	Fourth place
Kiyomi Vella	Public's vote	Advanced	Eliminated	
Michael Stangel	Public's vote	Eliminated		
Michael Paynter	Eliminated			
Celia Pavey	Public's vote	Advanced	Advanced	Third Place
Steve Clisby	Coach's choice	Advanced	Eliminated	
Jackie Sannia	Public's vote	Eliminated		
Tim Morrison	Eliminated			
Luke Kennedy	Coach's choice	Advanced	Advanced	Runner-Up
Miss Murphy	Public's vote	Advanced	Eliminated	
Simon Meli	Public's vote	Eliminated		
Caterina Torres	Eliminated			

== Guest performance(s) ==
Episode	Show segment	Performer(s)	Title	ARIA Singles Chart reaction	Performance type
16	Live Results Show 1	will.i.am	"thatPower"	No. 8 (+4)	live performance
19	Live Results Show 2	The Wanted	"Walks Like Rihanna"	No. 33 (debut)	live performance
21	Live Finals 2	Gurrumul Yunupingu and Delta Goodrem	"Bayini"	No. 4 (debut)	live performance
22	Live Finals 3	Karise Eden	"Threads of Silence"	No. 19 (debut)	live performance
23	Semi-finals	Timomatic	"Parachute"	No. 7 (debut)	live performance
24	Grand Final	OneRepublic	"Counting Stars"	–	live performance
24	Grand Final	Delta Goodrem	"Heart Hypnotic"	No. 7 (debut)	live performance
24	Grand Final	Robin Thicke	"Blurred Lines"	–	live performances
24	Grand Final	Ricky Martin	"Come With Me"	No. 3 (debut)	live performance
"—" denotes a recording that did not chart

== Reception ==
=== Ratings ===
Colour key:
– Highest rating during the season
– Lowest rating during the season

Episode		Original airdate	Timeslot	Viewers (millions)	Night Rank	Weekly Rank	Source
1	"The Blind Auditions"	7 April 2013	Sunday 6:30 pm	1.940	#1	#4	
2	"The Blind Auditions"	8 April 2013	Monday 7:00 pm	1.969	#1	#3	
3	"The Blind Auditions"	9 April 2013	Tuesday 7:00 pm	2.199	#1	#1	
4	"The Blind Auditions"	10 April 2013	Wednesday 7:00 pm	2.121	#1	#2	
5	"The Blind Auditions"	14 April 2013	Sunday 6:30 pm	2.103	#1	#2	
6	"The Blind Auditions"	15 April 2013	Monday 7:00 pm	2.172	#1	#1	
7	"The Blind Auditions"	16 April 2013	Tuesday 7:00 pm	2.029	#1	#3	
8	"The Blind Auditions"	21 April 2013	Sunday 6:30 pm	2.097	#1	#1	
9	"The Blind Auditions"	22 April 2013	Monday 7:00 pm	2.018	#1	#2	
10	"The Battles"	23 April 2013	Tuesday 7:00 pm	2.038	#1	#3	
11	"The Battles"	28 April 2013	Sunday 6:30 pm	2.092	#3	#5	
12	"The Battles"	29 April 2013	Monday 7:00 pm	2.116	#1	#4	
13	"The Battles"	30 April 2013	Tuesday 7:00 pm	2.138	#1	#3	
14	"The Showdowns"	5 May 2013	Sunday 6:30 pm	2.039	#1	#1	
15	"The Showdowns"	6 May 2013	Monday 7:00 pm	2.049	#1	#2	
16	"Live Results Show"	7 May 2013	Tuesday 7:00 pm	2.035	#1	#3	
17	"The Showdowns"	12 May 2013	Sunday 6:30 pm	2.035	#1	#1	
18	"The Showdowns"	13 May 2013	Monday 7:00 pm	1.685	#1	#2	
19	"Live Results Show"	14 May 2013	Tuesday 7:00 pm	1.655	#1	#3	
20	"Live Finals"	20 May 2013	Monday 7:00 pm	1.641	#1	#1	
21	"Live Finals"	27 May 2013	Monday 7:00 pm	1.699	#1	—N/a	
22	"Live Finals"	3 June 2013	Monday 7:00 pm	1.613	#1	—N/a	
23	"Semi-Finals"	10 June 2013	Monday 7:00 pm	1.777	#1	—N/a	
24	"Grand Finale"	17 June 2013	Monday 7:00 pm	2.093	#2	—N/a	
24	"Winner Announced"	17 June 2013	Monday 7:00 pm	2.380	#1	—N/a	

== Notes ==
One contestant who successfully secured a spot on team Joel, Adam Lerossignol, left the competition shortly after being selected for personal reasons. His performance of behind blue eyes was not televised.
