= Sannia (musician) =

Australian singer-songwriter

- Birth name: Jackie Sannia
- Born: Melbourne; Australia
- Genres: indie pop
- Instruments: Vocals; piano
- Years active: 2013–present
- Website: www.sanniamusic.com

Jackie Sannia, (known professionally as Sannia), is an Australian singer-songwriter. She placed in the top twelve in season 2 of The Voice Australia. Her debut album James was released in November 2023.

== Career ==
=== 2013–2014: Jackie Sannia, The Voice ===
In 2013, Sannia auditioned for the second season of The Voice Australia with the song "People Help the People". She joined Team Delta, eventually placing in the top twelve in the competition.

Round	Song	Original artist	Result
The Blind Auditions	"People Help the People"	Cherry Ghost	3 chairs turned Sannia chose to join Team Delta
Battle Rounds	"My Immortal" (vs. Jenna Dearness-Dark)	Evanescence	Won / Saved by Delta
The Showdowns	"Arithmetic"	Brooke Fraser	bottom 3 / sent to the sing-off
The Showdowns (sing-off)	"People Help the People"	Cherry Ghost	Saved by Delta
Live Finals 1	"Skyscraper"	Demi Lovato	Saved by public
Live Finals 2	"Smoke"	Natalie Imbruglia	eliminated

Following The Voice, Sannia collaborated with Australian Teenage Expo as an anti-bullying advocate, saying she experienced bullying first hand: "It really affects every single aspect of your world, from when you wake up in the morning until the time you go to bed. It can control you,"

=== 2018–2021: Sannia ===
On 15 June 2018, Sannia released her debut single, "Go and Get Over". Beat Magazine described the song as a "gorgeous, emotive R&B jam" that "featuring an immensely powerful vocal performance tackling the process of pushing through a broken relationship."

In 2019, Sannia released the duel singles "Daylight"/"Better". Both singles has associated videos.

In May 2021, Sannia was an honourable mention in the International Songwriting Competition.

In June 2021, Sannia released the single "Love You Like". Women in Pop said "'Love You Like' is the kind of lush, mature and totally immersive pop music that ripples through your soul and refuses to let go in the way truly great music never fails to do". This was followed by "Sad Rich Girls" in September 2021.

=== 2022–present: James ===
On 17 November 2023, Sannia released her debut album James. The album was preceded by three: singles: "Travelling"; "Trigger"; and "August".

Graeme Smith from York Calling said: "James is a collection that focusses on Sannia's on-again-off-again relationship of her late teens and early twenties, and the emotional impact it had on her life and her self-confidence."

== Personal life ==
Sannia is the grandchild of Sardinian immigrants.

In 2013, Sannia was diagnosed with Bipolar II disorder.

== Discography ==
=== Albums ===
List of albums, with selected chart positions
Title	Album details	Peak chart positions
Title	Album details	AUS
James	Released: 17 November 2023; Format: digital; Label: Sannia	— (Note: Jamesdid not enter the ARIA Top 100 Album Chart, but peaked at number 9 on the Australian 100% Independent Albums Chart.)

=== Charted singles ===
List of charted singles
Title	Year	Peak chart positions
Title	Year	AUS
"Arithmetic"	2013	24
"Skyscraper"	2013	65
"Smoke"	2013	42

== Awards and nominations ==
=== International Songwriting competition ===
Year	Nominee / work	Award	Result	Ref.
2021	"The Good Ones" – Jackie Sannia	International Songwriting Competition	Honorable Mention	
