= Darren Percival =

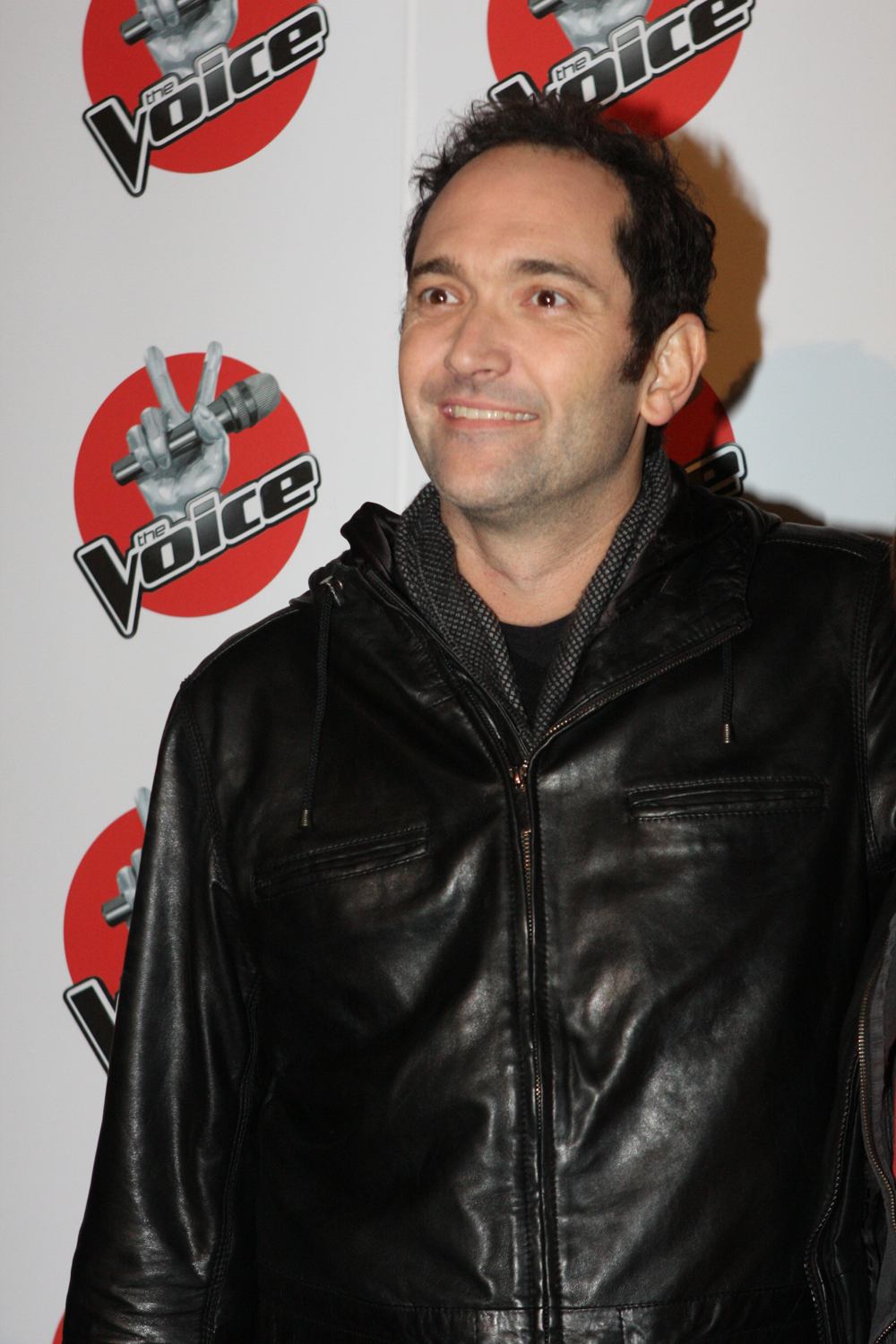
- Percival in 2012

Background information
- Also known as: Mr Percival
- Born: 13 January 1972 (age 54); Parramatta, Australia

Darren Percival is an Australian singer and was the runner-up on the first season of The Voice. His debut album Happy Home reached #3 on the ARIA albums charts and was certified gold. He attended Chatswood High School in Sydney where he featured in musical productions and performed alongside the big band as a jazz vocalist.

== Discography ==
=== Studio albums ===
Title	Album details	Peak chart positions	Certification
Title	Album details	AUS	Certification
Happy Home	Released: July 2012; Formats: CD, digital download; Label: Universal Music Australia	3	ARIA: Gold
A Tribute to Ray Charles	Released: 16 November 2012; Formats: CD, digital download; Label: Universal Music Australia	—	

=== Singles ===
Title	Year	Peak chart positions	Album
Title	Year	AUS	Album
"Wherever I Lay My Hat (That's My Home)" (The Voice performance)	2012	12	non album singles
"I Believe (When I Fall in Love It Will Be Forever)" (The Voice performance)	2012	6	non album singles
"A Song for You" (The Voice performance)	2012	36	non album singles
"Damage Down" (The Voice performance)	2012	8	non album singles
"For Once In My Life" (The Voice performance)	2012	17	non album singles
"In the Blowing Wind"	2012	-	Happy Home
"We're Better Than This" (featuring Mahalia Barnes)	2014	-	non album single
