= The Voice (Australian TV series) season 1 =

The Voice
- Season 1
- Promotional poster featuring coaches Urban, Goodrem, Seal, and Madden
- Hosted by: Darren McMullen; Faustina Agolley
- Judges: Joel Madden; Delta Goodrem; Seal; Keith Urban
- Winner: Karise Eden
- Winning coach: Seal
- Runner-up: Darren Percival

Release
- Original network: Nine Network
- Original release: 15 April – 18 June 2012

Season chronology
- Next → Season 2

The first season of The Voice, the Australian reality talent show, premiered on 15 April 2012 and concluded on 18 June 2012, with Karise Eden being crowned as the winner.

== Coaches and hosts ==
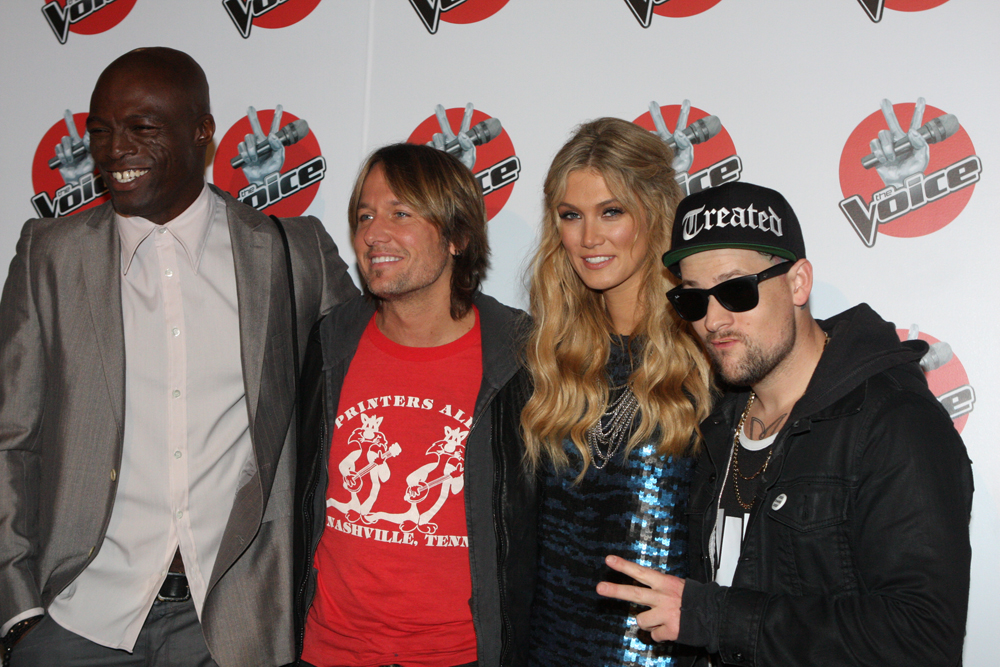
The Voice Australia coaches: Seal, Keith Urban, Delta Goodrem, and Joel Madden.

On 29 May 2011, it was reported in The Daily Telegraph that the Nine Network would broadcast The Voice in late 2011. However, two months later, they reported that the show would now air in early 2012, and that the Nine Network were in talks with signing at least one international artist (especially an American) to lead its panel of coaches on the show, which were rumoured to be Christina Aguilera, George Michael, Usher, Pink and Gwen Stefani. In September 2011, the Herald Sun reported that the Nine Network were planning to sign Australia's Got Talent judge Dannii Minogue as one of the coaches. Anthony Callea, Vanessa Amorosi and former Pussycat Dolls member Ashley Roberts all publicly expressed interest in coaching roles, however Delta Goodrem, Keith Urban, Seal and Joel Madden were ultimately confirmed as the four coaches for the first season.

Additionally, Ricki-Lee Coulter (with Seal), Darren Hayes (Goodrem), Megan Washington (Urban) and Benji Madden (with brother Joel) paired up with the coaches as mentors for their contestants.

Darren McMullen was announced as the host of the program in January 2012. Faustina Agolley was announced as the social media correspondent during the live shows in May 2012.

== Teams ==
Color key

- Winner
- Runner-up
- Third place
- Fourth place
- Eliminated in Live shows
- Eliminated in the Battle rounds
- Disqualified from competition

Coach	Top 48					
Seal						
Seal	Karise Eden	Fatai Veamatahau	Chris Sebastian	Emma Birdsall	Sam Ludeman	Michael Duchesne
Seal	Paula Parore	Mitchel Thompson	Yshrael Pascaul	Casey Withoos	Kieran Fraser	Anthony Dellamarta
Joel Madden						
Joel Madden	Sarah De Bono	Ben Hazlewood	Prinnie Stevens	Lakyn Heperi	Laura Bunting	Carmen Smith
Joel Madden	Yianna Stavrou	Chris Ninni	Mahalia Barnes	Nick Len	Mali-Koa Hood	Michelle Serret-Cursio
Delta Goodrem						
Delta Goodrem	Rachael Leahcar	Glenn Cunningham	Danni Da Ros	Viktoria Bolonina	Matt Hetherington	Ben Bennett
Delta Goodrem	Adam Hoek	Matty Chaps	Sarah Lloyde	Peta Jeffress	Jerson Trinidad	Jesse and Ashleigh
Keith Urban						
Keith Urban	Darren Percival	Diana Rouvas	Adam Martin	Brittany Cairns	Taga Paa	Jimmy Cupples
Keith Urban	Brett Clarke	Jaz Flowers	Abbie Cardwell	Kelsie Rimmer	Cam Tapp	Glenn Whitehall

== Blind auditions ==
Key
✓	Coach hit his/her "I Want You" button
Yes	Artist elected to join this coach's team
Yes	Artist defaulted to this coach's team
—N/a	Coach had completed their team and were therefore excluded from the ability to select artist

Filming for the blind auditions stage of the competition began on 19 February 2012 at Fox Studios in Sydney, with 121 artists featured in this phase of the selection process. The first day of filming resulted in hundreds of audience members being turned away from the studio due to overbooking of the event by an external booking agent.

=== Episode 1 (15 April) ===
The first episode of the Blind Auditions was broadcast on 15 April 2012.

"The Blind Auditions, Part 1"
Order	Artist	Age	Song	Coaches' and Artists' Choices			
Order	Artist	Age	Song	Seal	Joel	Delta	Keith
1	Casey Withoos	22	"Samson"	Yes	✓	✓	✓
2	Adam Martin	24	"Apologize"	—	✓	✓	Yes
3	Yianna Stavrou	19	"S&M"	—	Yes	—	—
4	Jerome O'Connor	25	"Yellow"	Eliminated			
5	Carmen Smith	28	"How Come U Don't Call Me Anymore?"	✓	Yes	✓	✓
6	Jimmy Cupples	46	"Woman"	—	✓	—	Yes
7	Melanie Dyer	19	"Domino"	Eliminated			
8	Karise Eden	19	"It's a Man's Man's Man's World"	Yes	✓	✓	✓

Coaches' performance
Performer(s)	Song
Keith Urban, Delta Goodrem, Joel Madden and Seal	"Crazy"

Karise Eden (No.41) debuted on the ARIA Charts after her performance.

=== Episode 2 (16 April) ===
The second episode of the Blind Auditions was broadcast on 16 April 2012.

"The Blind Auditions, Part 2"
Order	Artist	Age	Song	Coaches' and Artists' Choices			
Order	Artist	Age	Song	Seal	Joel	Delta	Keith
1	Sarah De Bono	19	"Price Tag"	-	Yes	✓	✓
2	Cam Tapp	40	"Superman (It's Not Easy)"	✓	-	✓	Yes
3	Gail Page	48	"I Put a Spell on You"	Eliminated			
4	Laura Bunting	24	"Wuthering Heights"	-	Yes	✓	-
5	Brett Clarke	26	"Making Memories of Us"	-	-	-	Yes
6	Rebecca Tapia	27	"If I Ain't Got You"	Eliminated			
7	Yshrael Pascaul	33	"Miss You"	Yes	✓	✓	✓
8	Chris Sebastian	23	"Halo"	Yes	-	✓	-
9	Rachael Leahcar	17	"La Vie en rose"	✓	✓	Yes	✓

Rachael Leahcar (No.18) debuted on the ARIA Charts after her performance.

=== Episode 3 (17 April) ===
The third episode of the Blind Auditions was broadcast on 17 April 2012.

"The Blind Auditions, Part 3"
Order	Artist	Age	Song	Coaches' and Artists' Choices			
Order	Artist	Age	Song	Seal	Joel	Delta	Keith
1	Matt Hetherington	41	"Evie"	-	-	Yes	-
2	Kelsie Rimmer	20	"Teenage Dream"	-	-	✓	Yes
3	Tom & Dakota	19/17	"Grace Kelly"	Eliminated			
4	Peta Jeffress	27	"Wonderwall"	-	-	Yes	-
5	Lakyn Heperi	19	"Kids"	✓	Yes	-	-
6	Danni Da Ros	29	"And I Am Telling You I'm Not Going"	-	-	Yes	✓
7	Juddy Mac	39	"Crazy"	Eliminated			
8	Adam Hoek	25	"Use Somebody"	-	-	Yes	-
9	Paula Parore	35	"Don't You Remember"	Yes	✓	✓	-
10	Michael Duchesne	21	"What a Fool Believes"	Yes	-	-	-

Lakyn Heperi (No.29) debuted on the ARIA Charts after his performance.

=== Episode 4 (22 April) ===
The fourth episode of the Blind Auditions was broadcast on 22 April 2012.

"The Blind Auditions, Part 4"
Order	Artist	Age	Song	Coaches' and Artists' Choices			
Order	Artist	Age	Song	Seal	Joel	Delta	Keith
1	Ben Hazlewood	23	"Breakeven"	-	Yes	✓	-
2	Taga Paa	26	"Isn't She Lovely?"	-	-	✓	Yes
3	Ben Bennett	17	"Teenage Dream"	-	-	Yes	-
4	Mahalia Barnes	26	"Proud Mary"	✓	Yes	✓	✓
5	Abbie Cardwell	36	"Ode to Billie Joe"	-	-	-	Yes
6	Sarah Lloyde	24	"The Voice Within"	-	-	Yes	-
7	Darren Percival	40	"Jealous Guy"	✓	✓	✓	Yes
8	Ben Potter	20	"You're The One That I Want"	Eliminated			
9	Mali-Koa Hood	20	"American Boy"	-	Yes	-	-
10	Rebekah Jensen	35	"Seven Nation Army"	Eliminated			
11	Shauna Jensen	57	"(You Make Me Feel Like) A Natural Woman"	Eliminated			
12	Glenn Cunningham	36	"Lately"	-	-	Yes	-
13	Emma Birdsall	20	"Mercy"	Yes	-	-	-

=== Episode 5 (23 April) ===
The fifth episode of the Blind Auditions was broadcast on 23 April 2012.

"The Blind Auditions, Part 5"
Order	Artist	Age	Song	Coaches' and Artists' Choices			
Order	Artist	Age	Song	Seal	Joel	Delta	Keith
1	Sam Ludeman	26	"Not Over You"	Yes	-	✓	-
2	Viktoria Bolonina	20	"Babooshka"	-	-	Yes	-
3	Glenn Whitehall	33	"A Change is Gonna Come"	-	-	✓	Yes
4	Diana Rouvas	28	"Work It Out"	-	-	-	Yes
5	Mitchell Thompson	18	"The A Team"	Yes	-	-	-
6	Esther Welch	22	"Fell in Love with a Girl"	Eliminated			
7	Jaz Flowers	24	"Big White Room"	✓	-	✓	Yes
8	Kieran Fraser	38	"Same Mistake"	Yes	-	✓	-
9	Cory Hargreaves	36	"We Are the Champions"	Eliminated			
10	Jerson Trinidad	39	"Ordinary People"	-	-	Yes	-
11	Michelle Serret-Cursio	36	"Only Girl (In the World)"	✓	Yes	-	✓

=== Episode 6 (24 April) ===
The sixth and final episode of the Blind Auditions was broadcast on 24 April 2012.

"The Blind Auditions, Part 6"
Order	Artist	Age	Song	Coaches' and Artists' Choices			
Order	Artist	Age	Song	Seal	Joel	Delta	Keith
1	Prinnie Stevens	31	"Sweet Dreams"	✓	Yes	-	-
2	Anthony Dellamarta	31	"On Broadway"	Yes	-	-	-
3	Nick Len	21	"Grenade"	-	Yes	-	-
4	Virginia Lillye	42	"Highway to Hell"	Eliminated			
5	Brittany Cairns	19	"Gravity"	✓	✓	✓	Yes
6	Matty Chaps	28	"20 Good Reasons"	-	-	Yes	—N/a
7	Tamara Stewart	36	"Dumb Things"	Eliminated			
8	Jesse & Ashleigh	both 17	"Lucky"	-	-	Yes	—N/a
9	Chris Ninni	34	"Always"	-	Yes	—N/a	—N/a
10	Fatai Veamatahau	16	"Songbird"	Yes	—N/a	—N/a	—N/a

== Battle rounds ==
Filming for the battle rounds started in late March 2012.

=== Episode 1 (30 April) ===
The first episode of the Battle Rounds was broadcast on 30 April 2012.

Key
Battle Winner
Eliminated Artist

"Let the Battles Begin, Part 1"
Coach	Artists		Song
Seal	Karise Eden	Paula Parore	"Back to Black"
Joel Madden	Ben Hazlewood	Chris Ninni	"The Only Exception"
Delta Goodrem	Glenn Cunningham	Matty Chaps	"Moves Like Jagger"
Keith Urban	Diana Rouvas	Jaz Flowers	"Mr. Know It All"
Seal	Fatai Veamatahau	Mitchell Thompson	"Love the Way You Lie (Part II)"
Delta Goodrem	Rachael Leahcar	Adam Hoek	"Over The Rainbow"
Keith Urban	Adam Martin	Abbie Cardwell	"Heartbeat"
Joel Madden	Prinnie Stevens	Mahalia Barnes	"Tainted Love"

Coaches' performance

Performer(s)	Song
Keith Urban, Delta Goodrem, Joel Madden and Seal	"One"

=== Episode 2 (1 May) ===
The second episode of the Battle Rounds was broadcast on 1 May 2012.

Key
Battle Winner
Eliminated Artist

"The Battles, Part 2"
Coach	Artists		Song
Keith Urban	Taga Paa	Cam Tapp	"Change the World"
Delta Goodrem	Viktoria Bolonina	Peta Jeffress	"Purple Rain"
Seal	Michael Duchesne	Anthony Dellamarta	"Living for the City"
Joel Madden	Lakyn Heperi	Nick Len	"Big Jet Plane"
Delta Goodrem	Danni Da Ros	Sarah Lloyd	"Hero"
Keith Urban	Jimmy Cupples	Glenn Whitehall	"Plans"
Joel Madden	Laura Bunting	Mali-Koa Hood	"What's Up?"
Seal	Chris Sebastian	Yshrael Pascual	"Firework"

Lakyn Heperi debuted on the ARIA Charts at #10 after his performance.

=== Episode 3 (7 May) ===
The third and final episode of the Battle Rounds was broadcast on 7 May 2012.

Key
Battle Winner
Eliminated Artist

"The Battles, Part 3"
Coach	Artists		Song
Joel Madden	Carmen Smith	Michelle Serret-Cursio	"We Found Love"
Seal	Sam Ludeman	Kieran Fraser	"Viva la Vida"
Keith Urban	Brittany Cairns	Kelsie Rimmer	"Turning Tables"
Delta Goodrem	Matt Hetherington	Jerson Trinidad	"Higher Ground"
Joel Madden	Sarah De Bono	Yianna Stavrou	"Heavy Cross"
Keith Urban	Darren Percival	Brett Clarke	"Shower the People"
Delta Goodrem	Ben Bennett	Jesse and Ashleigh	"Fireflies"
Seal	Emma Birdsall	Casey Withoos	"At Last"

Ben Bennett (No.93) debuted on the ARIA Charts after his performance.

== Live shows ==
=== Week 1 (14 May) ===
- Original broadcast date: 14 May 2012
- Coaches' performance: "Sing" with Top 24 contestants

Contestants' performances – "Live Show Final, Part 1"
Artist	Coach	Order	Song	Result
Fatai V (Note: Contestant Fatai Veamatahau's stage name was changed to 'Fatai V' from the Live Shows onwards.)	Seal	1	"Empire State of Mind (Part II) Broken Down"	Seal's Choice
Matt Hetherington	Delta	2	"White Noise"	Eliminated
Karise Eden	Seal	3	"Nothing's Real but Love"	Public Vote
Ben Bennett	Delta	4	"One Thing"	Eliminated
Michael Duchesne	Seal	5	"Got to Get You into My Life"	Eliminated
Danni Da Ros	Delta	6	"Alone"	Delta's Choice
Sam Ludeman	Seal	7	"Summer Paradise"	Eliminated
Viktoria Bolonina	Delta	8	"Bang Bang (My Baby Shot Me Down)"	Public Vote
Chris Sebastian	Seal	9	"Without You"	Seal's Choice
Glenn Cunninham	Delta	10	"Heaven Knows"	Delta's Choice
Emma Birdsall	Seal	11	"I Never Loved a Man (The Way I Love You)"	Public Vote
Rachael Leahcar	Delta	12	"Hands"	Public Vote

Notes

- Karise Eden (chart position 9), Rachael Leahcar (15), Viktoria Bolonina (28), Emma Birdsall (36) and Fatai V (43) all debuted on the ARIA Charts after their performances.

=== Week 2 (21 May) ===
- Original broadcast date: 21 May 2012

Contestants' performances – "Live Show Final, Part 2"
Artist	Coach	Order	Song	Result
Darren Percival	Keith	1	"Wherever I Lay My Hat (That's My Home)"	Public Vote
Prinnie Stevens	Joel	2	"Turn Me On"	Joel's Choice
Adam Martin	Keith	3	"Lonely Boy"	Keith's Choice
Sarah De Bono	Joel	4	"Listen"	Public Vote
Jimmy Cupples	Keith	5	"Sweet Child o' Mine"	Eliminated
Ben Hazlewood	Joel	6	"Lego House"	Joel's Choice
Taga Paa	Keith	7	"Fight for You"	Eliminated
Laura Bunting	Joel	8	"Somebody That I Used To Know"	Eliminated
Diana Rouvas	Keith	9	"Love on Top"	Keith's Choice
Lakyn Heperi	Joel	10	"Forever Young"	Public Vote
Brittany Cairns	Keith	11	"Different Worlds"	Public Vote

Notes

- Brittany Cairns (chart position 7), Darren Percival (12), Sarah De Bono (13), Diana Rouvas (22), Lakyn Heperi (26) and Ben Hazlewood (35) all debuted on the ARIA Charts after their performances.
- Team Joel contestant Carmen Smith was disqualified from the competition before the live show. (Note: Contestant Carmen Smith was disqualified from the competition after appearing in a music video with singer Guy Sebastian for his song, "Gold". The Nine Network deemed the appearance as an "unfair advantage" over other contestants and it made a decision with the producers of the show to immediately disqualify her from the competition. This is the first disqualification of a contestant in the history of the show's format.) To keep the teams even, Team Joel only eliminated one contestant in the first live round while the other teams still eliminated two.

=== Week 3 (28 May) ===
- Original broadcast date: 28 May 2012
- Group performances:
  - Delta and her team (Glenn Cunningham, Rachael Leahcar, Viktoria Bolonina, Danni Da Ros) – "Born to Try"
  - Seal and his team (Chris Sebastian, Emma Birdsall, Fatai V, Karise Eden) – "Kiss From a Rose"

Contestants' performances – "Live Show Final, Part 3"
Artist	Coach	Order	Song	Result
Chris Sebastian	Seal	1	"I Can't Stand The Rain"	Eliminated
Danni Da Ros	Delta Goodrem	2	"When Love Takes Over"	Eliminated
Emma Birdsall	Seal	3	"The Look of Love"	Eliminated
Viktoria Bolonina	Delta Goodrem	4	"Smells Like Teen Spirit"	Eliminated
Glenn Cunningham	Delta Goodrem	5	"Closer"	Delta's Choice
Fatai V	Seal	6	"Ave Maria"	Seal's Choice
Rachael Leahcar	Delta Goodrem	7	"Someone To Watch Over Me"	Public Vote
Karise Eden	Seal	8	"Landslide"	Public Vote

Notes

- Karise Eden (chart position 14), Fatai V (25) and Rachael Leahcar (41) all debuted on the ARIA Charts in the week after their performances.
- Due to a pre-organised concert tour in Los Angeles, Keith Urban was absent during the episode but was still present via live video.

=== Week 4 (4 June) ===
The fourth episode of the Live Shows, the Quarter-Finals, was broadcast on 4 June 2012.

Competition Performances

"Live Show Final, Part 4"
Artist	Coach	Order	Song	Result
Prinnie Stevens	Joel Madden	1	"Forever"	Eliminated
Diana Rouvas	Keith Urban	2	"I Can't Make You Love Me"	Keith's Choice
Lakyn Heperi	Joel Madden	3	"Friday I'm In Love"	Eliminated
Brittany Cairns	Keith Urban	4	"Straight Lines"	Eliminated
Adam Martin	Keith Urban	5	"Romeo and Juliet"	Eliminated
Sarah De Bono	Joel Madden	6	"How Will I Know"	Public Vote
Darren Percival	Keith Urban	7	"I Believe (When I Fall in Love It Will Be Forever)"	Public Vote
Ben Hazlewood	Joel Madden	8	"I'm with You"	Joel's Choice

Group performances

Performer(s)	Song
Joel Madden and his team (Ben Hazlewood, Sarah De Bono, Lakyn Heperi, Prinnie Stevens)	"Dance Floor Anthem (I Don't Want to Be in Love)"
Keith Urban and his team (Diana Rouvas, Adam Martin, Brittany Cairns, Darren Percival)	"I'm In"

Darren Percival (No. 6), Diana Rouvas (No. 16), Ben Hazlewood (No. 17), Sarah De Bono (No. 24), Adam Martin (No. 26) and Lakyn Heperi (No. 39) all debuted on the ARIA Charts in the week after their performances.

=== Week 5 (11 June) ===
The fifth episode of the Live Shows, the Semi-Finals, was broadcast on 11 June 2012.

Competition Performances

"Live Show Final, Part 5"
Order	Coach	Artist	Song	Result
1	Seal	Fatai V	"On the Radio"	Eliminated
2	Delta Goodrem	Glenn Cunningham	"Heaven"	Eliminated
3	Joel Madden	Sarah De Bono	"Here's Where I Stand"	Joel's Choice
4	Keith Urban	Diana Rouvas	"Stormy Monday"	Eliminated
5	Delta Goodrem	Rachael Leahcar	"Nights in White Satin (Notte Di Luce)"	Delta's Choice
6	Joel Madden	Ben Hazlewood	"My Kind of Love"	Eliminated
7	Keith Urban	Darren Percival	"A Song For You"	Keith's Choice
8	Seal	Karise Eden	"Hallelujah"	Seal's Choice

Karise Eden (No. 2), Sarah De Bono (No. 30), Darren Percival (No. 36) and Rachael Leahcar (No. 43) all debuted on the ARIA Charts in the week after their performances.

=== Week 6: Final (17 June) ===
The sixth and seventh episodes of the Live Shows, parts one and two of the Live Finale of The Voice Australia, were broadcast on 17 June 2012 and 18 June 2012 consecutively. In part two of the Live Finale, Karise Eden was announced as the winner and won a recording contract with Universal Music Group, a Ford Focus Titanium and a A$100,000 cash prize. Darren Percival was runner-up, finishing in second place, winning a cash prize of A$30,000. Rachael Leahcar came in third place, winning a cash prize of A$20,000 while Sarah De Bono placed fourth, winning a cash prize of A$10,000 .

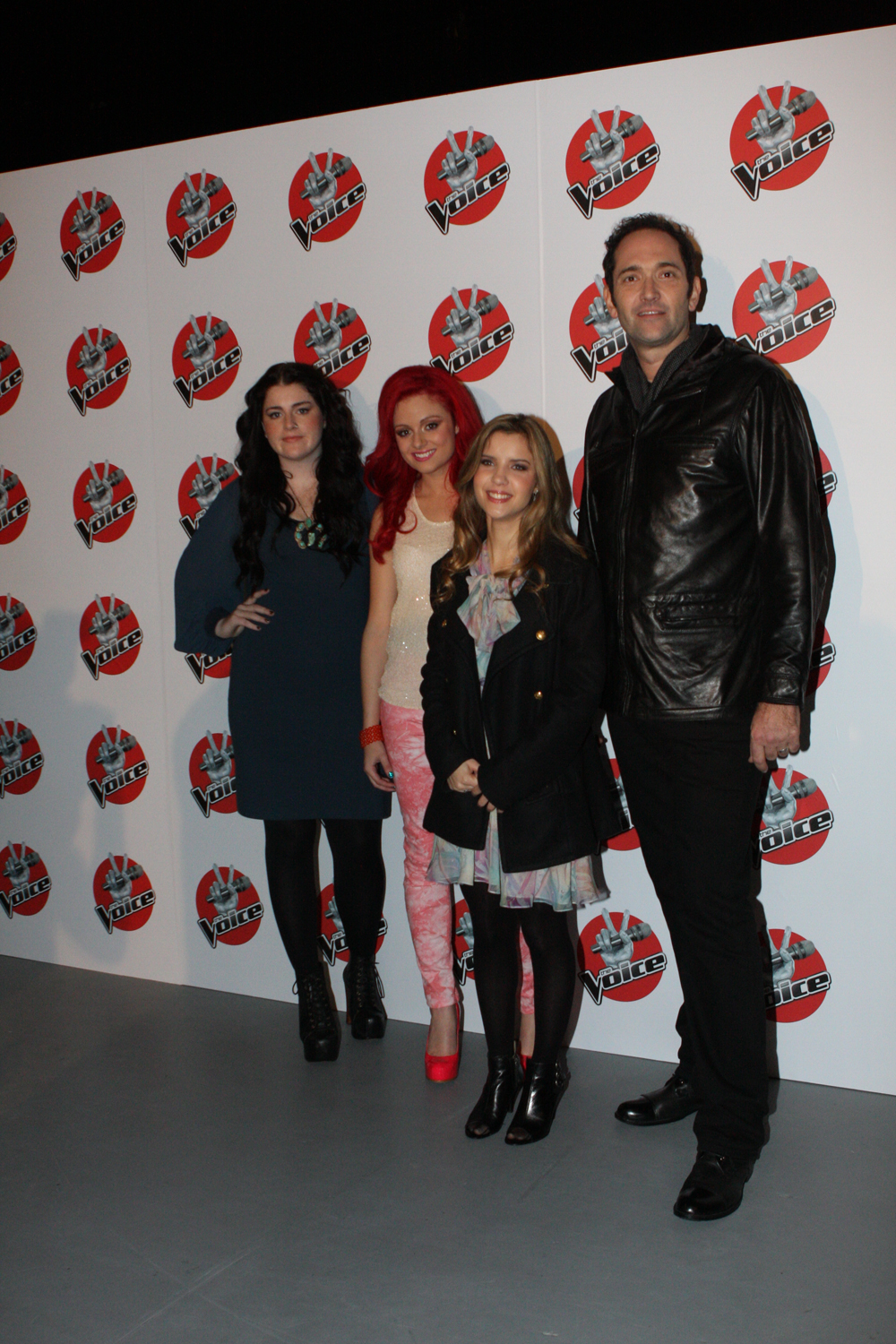
The final four contestants: Karise Eden, Sarah De Bono, Rachael Leahcar, and Darren Percival.

Key
Winner
Runner-up
Third place
Fourth place

Competition performances

"The Live Finale, Part 1" and "The Live Finale, Part 2"
Artist	Coach	Order	Song	Result
Sarah De Bono	Joel Madden	1	"If I Didn't Love You"	Fourth place
Sarah De Bono	Joel Madden	5	"Beautiful"	Fourth place
Karise Eden	Seal	2	"I Was Your Girl"	Winner
Karise Eden	Seal	6	"Stay with Me Baby"	Winner
Karise Eden	Seal	9	"You Won't Let Me"	Winner
Rachael Leahcar	Delta Goodrem	3	"Smile"	Third place
Rachael Leahcar	Delta Goodrem	7	"Shooting Star"	Third place
Darren Percival	Keith Urban	4	"Damage Down"	Runner-up
Darren Percival	Keith Urban	8	"For Once in My Life"	Runner-up

Coach and Group performances

Performer(s)	Song
Lionel Richie and Joel Madden	"Easy"
Karise Eden, Rachael Leahcar, Darren Percival and Sarah De Bono	"The Chain"
Joel Madden and Sarah De Bono	"It Will Rain"
Seal and Karise Eden	"Many Rivers to Cross"
Delta Goodrem and Rachael Leahcar	"The Prayer"
Keith Urban and Darren Percival	"Without You"
Mahalia Barnes and Prinnie Stevens (with Jimmy Barnes)	"River Deep – Mountain High"

== Specials ==
=== Voices Reaching Out ===
The Nine Network announced on 3 July 2012 that a one-off charity concert special, Voices Reaching Out, for The Reach Foundation would be aired. The special was staged at The Palms at Crown complex and hosted by The Voice host Darren McMullen. It featured all four finalists, Karise Eden, Darren Percival, Rachael Leahcar and Sarah De Bono. Contestants Prinnie Stevens, Mahalia Barnes, Adam Martin, Ben Hazlewood, Chris Sebastian, Fatai V, Mitchell Johnson, Brittany Cairns, Kelsie Rimmer, Diana Rouvas, Viktoria Bolonina, Emma Birdsall and Casey Withoos also performed. Singer and Team Keith mentor Megan Washington also performed. Also appearing was The Voice social media correspondent Faustina Agolley, joined by Jules Lund and Jesinta Campbell. The 90-minute concert was filmed 12 July 2012 and aired 15 July 2012 on the Nine Network.

Performances

Performer(s)	Song
Glenn Cunningham, Ben Hazlewood, Prinnie Stevens, Mitchell Thompson, Brittany Cairns, Diana Rouvas, Rachael Leahcar, Emma Birdsall, Adam Martin, Chris Sebastian, Sarah De Bono, Casey Withoos, Kelsie Rimmer, Viktoria Bolonina, Fatai V and Darren Percival	"I Gotta Feeling"
Karise Eden	"You Won't Let Me"
Mitchell Thompson and Fatai V	"I Won't Let You Go"
Mahalia Barnes and Prinnie Stevens	"Respect"
Adam Martin and Ben Hazlewood	"Valerie"
Megan Washington	"Sometimes You Need"
Darren Percival	"How Sweet It Is (To Be Loved by You)"
Fatai V, Sarah De Bono, Brittany Cairns and Diana Rouvas	"Because of You"
Diana Rouvas	"Crazy in Love"/"Crazy"
Adam Martin, Ben Hazlewood, Chris Sebastian and Glen Cunningham	"With or Without You"
Rachael Leahcar	"A Thousand Years"
Sarah De Bono	"The Edge of Glory"
Brittany Cairns and Kelsie Rimmer	"Turning Tables"
Karise Eden	"Hound Dog"
Emma Birdsall, Prinnie Stevens, Brittany Cairns, Diana Rouvas, Rachael Leahcar, Sarah De Bono, Casey Withoos, Kelsie Rimmer, Viktoria Bolonina, Fatai V, Karise Eden, Darren Percival, Adam Martin, Chris Sebastian, Mitchell Thompson, Glenn Cunningham, Ben Hazlewood	"Reach Out and Touch (Somebody's Hand)"/"Reach Out I'll Be There"

== Elimination Chart ==
=== Overall ===
Artist's info

- Artist from Team Seal
- Artist from Team Delta
- Artist from Team Joel
- Artist from Team Keith

Result details

- Winner
- Runner-up
- Third place
- Fourth Place
- Artist was saved by the public
- Artist was saved by his/her coach
- Artist was eliminated
- Artist was disqualified

Live show results per week
Artist	Week 1	Week 2	Week 3	Week 4	Week 5	Finals
Karise Eden	Safe	—N/a	Safe	—N/a	Safe	Winner
Darren Percival	—N/a	Safe	—N/a	Safe	Safe	Runner-Up
Rachael Leahcar	Safe	—N/a	Safe	—N/a	Safe	3rd place
Sarah De Bono	—N/a	Safe	—N/a	Safe	Safe	4th place
Ben Hazlewood	—N/a	Safe	—N/a	Safe	Eliminated	Eliminated (Week 5)
Diana Rouvas	—N/a	Safe	—N/a	Safe	Eliminated	Eliminated (Week 5)
Fatai Veamatahau	Safe	—N/a	Safe	—N/a	Eliminated	Eliminated (Week 5)
Glenn Cunningham	Safe	—N/a	Safe	—N/a	Eliminated	Eliminated (Week 5)
Adam Martin	—N/a	Safe	—N/a	Eliminated	Eliminated (Week 4)	
Brittany Cairns	—N/a	Safe	—N/a	Eliminated	Eliminated (Week 4)	
Lakyn Heperi	—N/a	Safe	—N/a	Eliminated	Eliminated (Week 4)	
Prinnie Stevens	—N/a	Safe	—N/a	Eliminated	Eliminated (Week 4)	
Chris Sebastian	Safe	—N/a	Eliminated	Eliminated (Week 3)		
Danni Da Ros	Safe	—N/a	Eliminated	Eliminated (Week 3)		
Emma Birdsall	Safe	—N/a	Eliminated	Eliminated (Week 3)		
Viktoria Bolonina	Safe	—N/a	Eliminated	Eliminated (Week 3)		
Jimmy Cupples	—N/a	Eliminated	Eliminated (Week 2)			
Laura Bunting	—N/a	Eliminated	Eliminated (Week 2)			
Tega Paa	—N/a	Eliminated	Eliminated (Week 2)			
Ben Bennett	Eliminated	Eliminated (Week 1)				
Matt Hetherington	Eliminated	Eliminated (Week 1)				
Michael Duchesne	Eliminated	Eliminated (Week 1)				
Sam Ludeman	Eliminated	Eliminated (Week 1)				
Carmen Smith	Disqualified (Week 1)					

=== Artist's info ===
- Artist from Team Seal
- Artist from Team Delta
- Artist from Team Joel
- Artist from Team Keith

Result details

- Winner
- Runner-up
- Third place
- Fourth Place
- Artist was eliminated
- Artist Saved by his/her coach

Live show results per week
Artist	Live Shows			The Live Finale
Artist	Weeks 1 & 2	Weeks 3 & 4	Week 5	The Live Finale
Karise Eden	Advanced	Advanced	Advanced	Winner
Fatai V	Advanced	Advanced	Eliminated	
Chris Sebastian	Advanced	Eliminated		
Emma Birdsall	Advanced	Eliminated		
Michael Duchesne	Eliminated			
Sam Ludeman	Eliminated			
Sarah De Bono	Advanced	Advanced	Advanced	Fourth place
Ben Hazlewood	Advanced	Advanced	Eliminated	
Lakyn Heperi	Advanced	Eliminated		
Prinnie Stevens	Advanced	Eliminated		
Laura Bunting	Eliminated			
Carmen Smith				
Rachael Leahcar	Advanced	Advanced	Advanced	Third place
Glenn Cunningham	Advanced	Advanced	Eliminated	
Danni Da Ros	Advanced	Eliminated		
Viktoria Bolonina	Advanced	Eliminated		
Ben Bennett	Eliminated			
Matt Hetherington	Eliminated			
Darren Percival	Advanced	Advanced	Advanced	Runner-up
Diana Rouvas	Advanced	Advanced	Eliminated	
Adam Martin	Advanced	Eliminated		
Brittany Cairns	Advanced	Eliminated		
Jimmy Cupples	Eliminated			
Taga Paa	Eliminated			

== Reception ==
=== Ratings ===
Colour key:
Highest rating during the season
Lowest rating during the season

Episode		Original airdate	Timeslot	Viewers (millions)	Night Rank	Weekly Rank	Source
1	"The Blind Auditions"	15 April 2012	Sunday 6:30 pm–8:00 pm	2.190	#1	#3	
2	"The Blind Auditions"	16 April 2012	Monday 8:00 pm–9:30 pm	2.534	#1	#1	
3	"The Blind Auditions"	17 April 2012	Tuesday 7:30 pm–9:00 pm	2.373	#1	#2	
4	"The Blind Auditions"	22 April 2012	Sunday 6:30 pm–8:30 pm	2.704	#1	#1	
5	"The Blind Auditions"	23 April 2012	Monday 8:00 pm–9:30 pm	2.522	#1	#2	
6	"The Blind Auditions"	24 April 2012	Tuesday 7:30 pm–9:00 pm	2.458	#1	#3	
7	"The Battles"	30 April 2012	Monday 7:30 pm–9:30 pm	2.620	#1	#1	
8	"The Battles"	1 May 2012	Tuesday 8:00 pm–10:00 pm	2.267	#1	#2	
9	"The Battles"	7 May 2012	Monday 7:30 pm–9:30 pm	2.328	#1	#1	
10	"Live Show Finals"	14 May 2012	Monday 7:30 pm–9:30 pm	2.199	#1	#1	
11	"Live Show Finals"	21 May 2012	Monday 7:30 pm–9:30 pm	1.934	#1	#2	
12	"Live Show Finals"	28 May 2012	Monday 7:30 pm–9:30 pm	1.975	#1	#1	
13	"Live Show Finals"	4 June 2012	Monday 7:30 pm–9:30 pm	1.894	#1	#1	
14	"Live Show Finals"	11 June 2012	Monday 7:30 pm–9:30 pm	2.154	#1	#2	
15	"The Live Finale, Part 1"	17 June 2012	Sunday 7:30 pm–9:30 pm	2.244	#1	#3	
16	"The Live Finale, Part 2"	18 June 2012	Monday 7:30 pm–9:30 pm	2.749	#2	#2	
16	"Winner Announced"	18 June 2012	Monday 7:30 pm–9:30 pm	3.238	#1	#1	
-	"Voices Reaching Out"	15 July 2012	Sunday 6:30 pm–8:30 pm	1.006	#8	—N/a	
