= Unconditional (Ne-Yo song) =

2012 song by Ne-Yo

Song by Ne-Yo

from the album R.E.D.
- Recorded: 2011–12
- Genre: Dance-pop
- Length: 4:38
- Label: Motown; Compound Entertainment
- Songwriters: Shaffer Smith; Allen Arthur; Clayton Reilly; Keith Justice
- Producer: Phatboiz

"Unconditional" is a song recorded by American singer-songwriter Ne-Yo for his fifth studio album R.E.D. (2012). It was written by Ne-Yo, Allen Arthur, Clayton Reilly and Keith Justice; the latter three also produced the song under their production moniker Phatboiz..

== Harrison Craig version ==
"Unconditional"

Single by Harrison Craig

from the album More Than a Dream
- Released: 18 June 2013
- Recorded: 2012–13
- Length: 4:34
- Label: Universal
- Songwriters: Shaffer Smith, Allen Arthur, Clayton Reilly, Keith Justice

Harrison Craig singles chronology
"More Than a Dream" (2013)	"Unconditional" (2013)	"Lift Your Spirit" (2013)

In 2013, Harrison Craig, winner of the second series of The Voice in Australia, recorded a version of the song for his debut album More than a Dream. It was released as a single on 18 June 2013 and reached No. 15 in Australia.

== Live performance ==
Craig first performed the song on the series' grand final after he was declared the winner.

== Release history ==
Country	Date	Format	Label
Australia	18 June 2013	Digital download	Universal Music
