= Lakyn Heperi =

- Birth name: Lakyn Heperi
- Born: 28 April 1992 (age 32); Auckland, New Zealand
- Genres: Pop, pop rock, acoustic, folk rock
- Occupation(s): Musician, singer-songwriter
- Instrument(s): Vocals, guitar
- Years active: 2010–present
- Labels: Universal Music Australia
- Website: www.lakyn.com.au

Lakyn Heperi (born 28 April 1992) is an Australian-based New Zealand singer, songwriter and musician best known for appearing on The Voice Australia; he was eliminated at the quarterfinal stage. His debut EP, Better Than That, was released on 16 November 2012 through Universal Music Australia.

== Early life ==
Lakyn grew up in Auckland, New Zealand and played piano from the age of 3, encouraged by his mother Anne-Maree and his musician father Doug. At the age of 12, Lakyn relocated to Victoria, Australia with his family. In his mid-late teens he became a semi-professional skateboarder until he broke his ankle in an accident and was off his feet for eight months. During this time, Lakyn developed his musicianship and songwriting from his bedroom and shared it on YouTube, developing a large fan base and receiving millions of views of his videos. This support gave him the encouragement to submit an audition tape to The Voice (Australia). He cites Bob Dylan, Bon Iver, Jeff Buckley and The Beatles amongst his musical influences.

== Music career ==
=== The Voice Australia ===
Lakyn auditioned in Melbourne with an acoustic version of "Kids" by MGMT, accompanying himself on guitar. His audition impressed both Joel Madden and Seal enough to turn their chairs for him and he chose to progress in the competition on Team Joel. He was pitted against Nick Len in the battle round with the song "Big Jet Plane" by Angus & Julia Stone where he was chosen as the winner by Madden. Lakyn's studio recording of "Big Jet Plane" was the first performance by The Voice contestants to top the iTunes singles chart. In his first live show, Lakyn sang "Forever Young" by Alphaville. He progressed in the competition thanks to the public vote. At the quarterfinal stage, Lakyn sang "Friday I'm in Love" by The Cure. Lakyn was eliminated from the competition in the public vote after this performance.

==== Performances ====
Performed	Song	Original artist	Result
Blind Audition	"Kids"	MGMT	Joined Team Joel
Battle Rounds	"Big Jet Plane" (against Nick Len)	Angus Stone	Winner
Live Show Final, Part 2	"Forever Young"	Alphaville	Public vote
Live Show Final, Part 4	"Friday I'm in Love"	The Cure	Eliminated
Live Show Final, Part 4	Dance Floor Anthem (as part of Team Joel)	Good Charlotte	Eliminated

=== Better Than That EP ===
On 16 November 2012, Lakyn released his first EP Better Than That through Universal Music Australia. The EP contains four self-penned songs as well as an acoustic cover of "(I Just) Died in Your Arms" by Cutting Crew. The EP received positive reviews from critics with The AU Review saying "Better Than That is a strong EP, with a maturity and depth in the music that's not easy to find in an artist." On 20 January 2013, Lakyn debuted his first music video, for the track "Don't Tell Me" from the EP.

In April 2013, Lakyn performed with Diafrix for Triple J's "Good Az Friday" at Melbourne Town Hall with a hip hop cover of James Blake's "Retrograde".

Also in April 2013, Lakyn supported Birdy on her Australian tour, along with Lewis Watson.

=== Not Original Material EP ===
A second EP was released in January 2014, titled Not Original Material also via Universal Music Australia. The EP consisted of 5 covers and debuted at number 44 on week commencing 20 July 2015.

== Discography ==
=== Extended plays ===
Title	EP details
Better Than That	Released: 16 November 2012; Label: UMA; Format: Digital download
Not Original Material	Released: January 2014; Label: UMA; Format: Digital download
& Pains	Released: September 2018; Label: Island Music; Format: Digital download, streaming
