= Cat Torres =

Australian singer-songwriter

Caterina Torres
- Born: Australia
- Genre: Pop
- Instruments: Vocals, piano
- Years active: 2009–present
- Website: facebook.com/cattorresmusic

Caterina Torres (born 14 January 1991) is a Melbourne-based singer-songwriter. At the age of 18, Torres signed a record deal with Sony/RCA in Britain. In 2013, Torres was a contestant on The Voice. Her coach, Ricky Martin invited her to be a special guest on his national tour, performing in arenas around the country. Torres later signed to Mercury Records Australia which is part of Universal Music Australia.

== The Voice Australia ==
=== Performances ===
Round	Song	Original artist	Order	Result
The Blind Auditions	"Hot Right Now"	DJ Fresh & Rita Ora	9	All judges offered to coach Torres chose to join Team Ricky
Battle Rounds	"Try" (vs. Katie Reeve)	P!nk	5	Saved by Ricky
The Showdowns	"If I Were a Boy"	Beyoncé	5	Gone to Sing Off
Sing Off	"Hot Right Now"	DJ Fresh & Rita Ora	2	Saved by Ricky
Live Finals 1	"Love Don't Cost a Thing"	Jennifer Lopez	14	Eliminated

== Discography ==
=== Singles ===
Year	Title	Peak positions
Year	Title	AUS
2013	"Love Don’t Cost a Thing"	-
2013	"If I Were a Boy"	28
2013	"Try"	-
2013	"Hot Right Now"	–
2014	"Easy to Say Goodbye"	–
