= Harrison Craig =

Australian singer (born 1994)

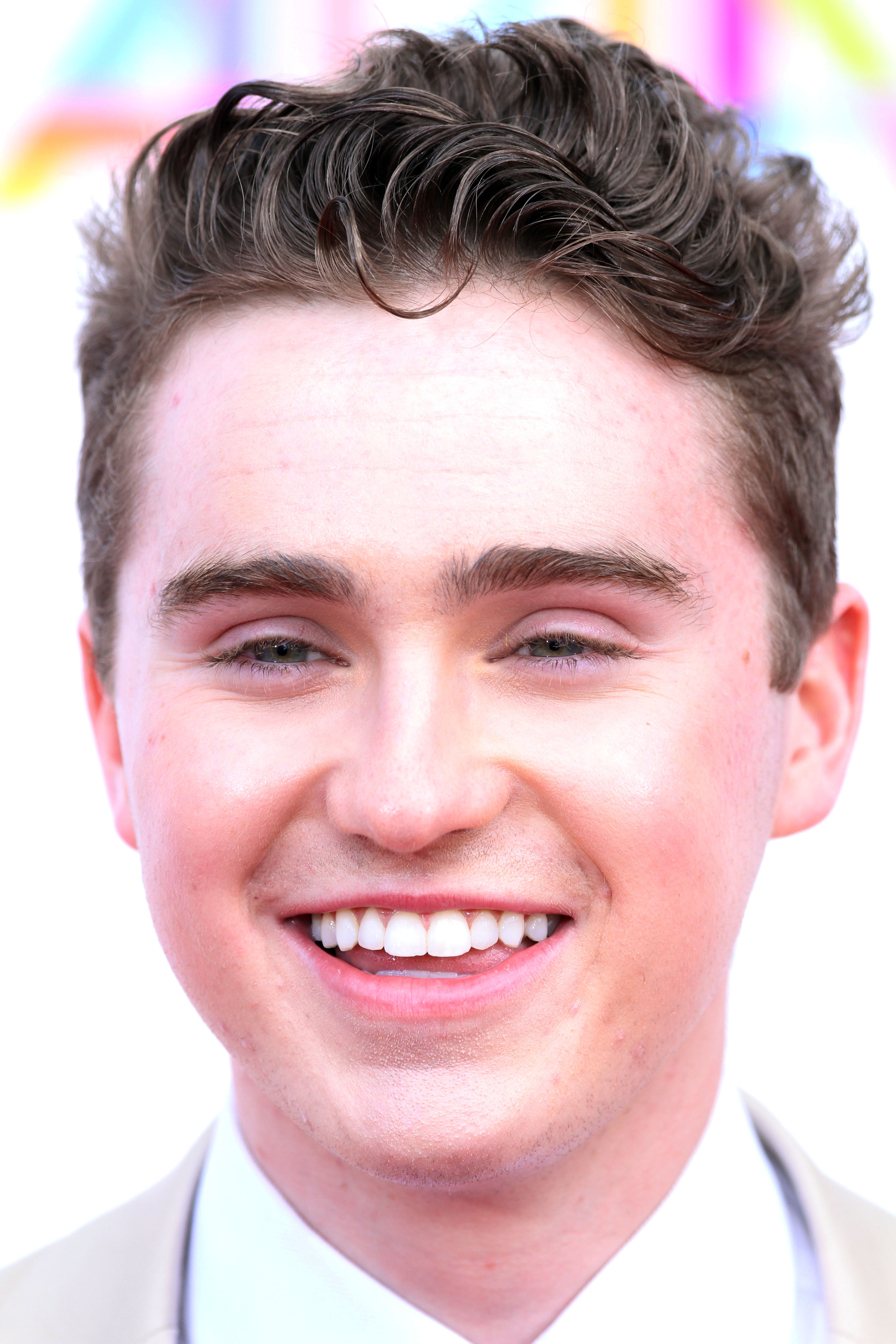
- Harrison Craig at the 2014 ARIA Music Awards, Sydney, November 26th, 2014

Background information
- Born: 7 September 1994 (age 32); Melbourne, Australia
- Origin: Melbourne, Victoria, Australia
- Genres: Pop, adult contemporary
- Instrument: Vocals
- Years active: 2013–present
- Label: Universal
- Website: harrison-craig.com

Harrison Craig (born 7 September 1994) is an Australian singer who won the second series of The Voice Australia. Craig was coached in the program by British singer Seal. Craig has had three songs on the ARIA Singles Chart top 10 with his cover of "Unchained Melody" reaching No. 2 and his original song, "More Than a Dream", at No. 3. His debut album titled More Than a Dream was released on 25 June 2013. His second album L.O.V.E was released 11 April 2014, and his third, Kings of Vegas, in November 2016.

== The Voice Australia ==
=== Performances ===
Round	Song	Original artist	Order	Result
The Blind Auditions	"Broken Vow"	Lara Fabian	9	All judges offered to coach Craig chose to join Team Seal
Battle Rounds	"You Raise Me Up" (vs. Tim Moxey)	Secret Garden	6	Saved by Seal
The Showdowns	"Home"	Michael Bublé	8	Saved by public
Live Finals 1	"Can't Help Falling in Love"	Elvis Presley	8	Saved by public
Live Finals 2	"It Had Better Be Tonight"	Fran Jeffries	12	Saved by public
Live Finals 3	"If"	Bread	1	Saved by public
Semi-finals	"Unchained Melody"	The Righteous Brothers	3	Advanced
Semi-finals	"More Than a Dream"	Harrison Craig	12	Advanced
Grand Final	"You're the Voice" (with Celia Pavey, Danny Ross and Luke Kennedy)	John Farnham	1	Winner
Grand Final	"He Ain't Heavy, He's My Brother" (with Seal)	The Hollies	7	Winner
Grand Final	"Unconditional"	Ne-Yo	—N/a	Winner

== Personal life ==
In 2010, Craig fronted Garage Band High and sang the lead on their video of the song "Viva la Vida".

Craig completed his VCE in 2012 at Sandringham College, where he was Music Captain.

As of 2013, Craig lived in Chelsea, Melbourne, with his brother, Connor, and his mother, Janine Cochrane. His father left the family when Craig was six years of age.

Craig has a stutter. To help build his confidence, his mother encouraged him to join the Victorian Boys Choir and undertake private voice lessons. His stutter has decreased since he competed in The Voice.

In approximately May 2025, Craig married Brooke Cochrane.

== Discography ==
=== Studio albums ===
Title	Album details	Peak chart positions		Certifications
Title	Album details	AUS	NZ	Certifications
More Than a Dream	Released: 25 June 2013; Formats: CD, digital download; Label: Mercury Records, Universal Music Australia	1	1	ARIA: Platinum
L.O.V.E.	Released: 11 April 2014; Formats: CD, digital download; Label: Mercury Records, Universal Music Australia	5	—	
Kings of Vegas	Released: 4 November 2016; Formats: CD, digital download; Label: Universal Music Australia	36	—	

=== Singles ===
Title	Year	Peak chart positions	Certifications	Album
Title	Year	AUS	Certifications	Album
"Broken Vow"	2013	18		More Than a Dream
"You Raise Me Up"	2013	33		More Than a Dream
"Home"	2013	13		More Than a Dream
"Can't Help Falling in Love"	2013	6		More Than a Dream
"It Had Better Be Tonight"	2013	12		More Than a Dream
"If"	2013	24		More Than a Dream
"Unchained Melody"	2013	2	ARIA: Gold	More Than a Dream
"More Than a Dream"	2013	3		More Than a Dream
"Unconditional"	2013	15		More Than a Dream
"Lift Your Spirit"	2013	84		—N/a
"—" denotes releases that did not chart.

=== Guest appearances ===
Year	Song	Album
2014	"Go the Distance" (from Hercules)	We Love Disney

== Tours ==
- More Than a Dream Tour (2013)
- L.O.V.E. Mother's Day Tour (2014)
- Kings of Vegas Lounge Sessions Tour (2017)

Preceded by Karise Eden	The Voice winner 2013	Succeeded by Anja Nissen
