= Emma Birdsall =

Australian singer-songwriter

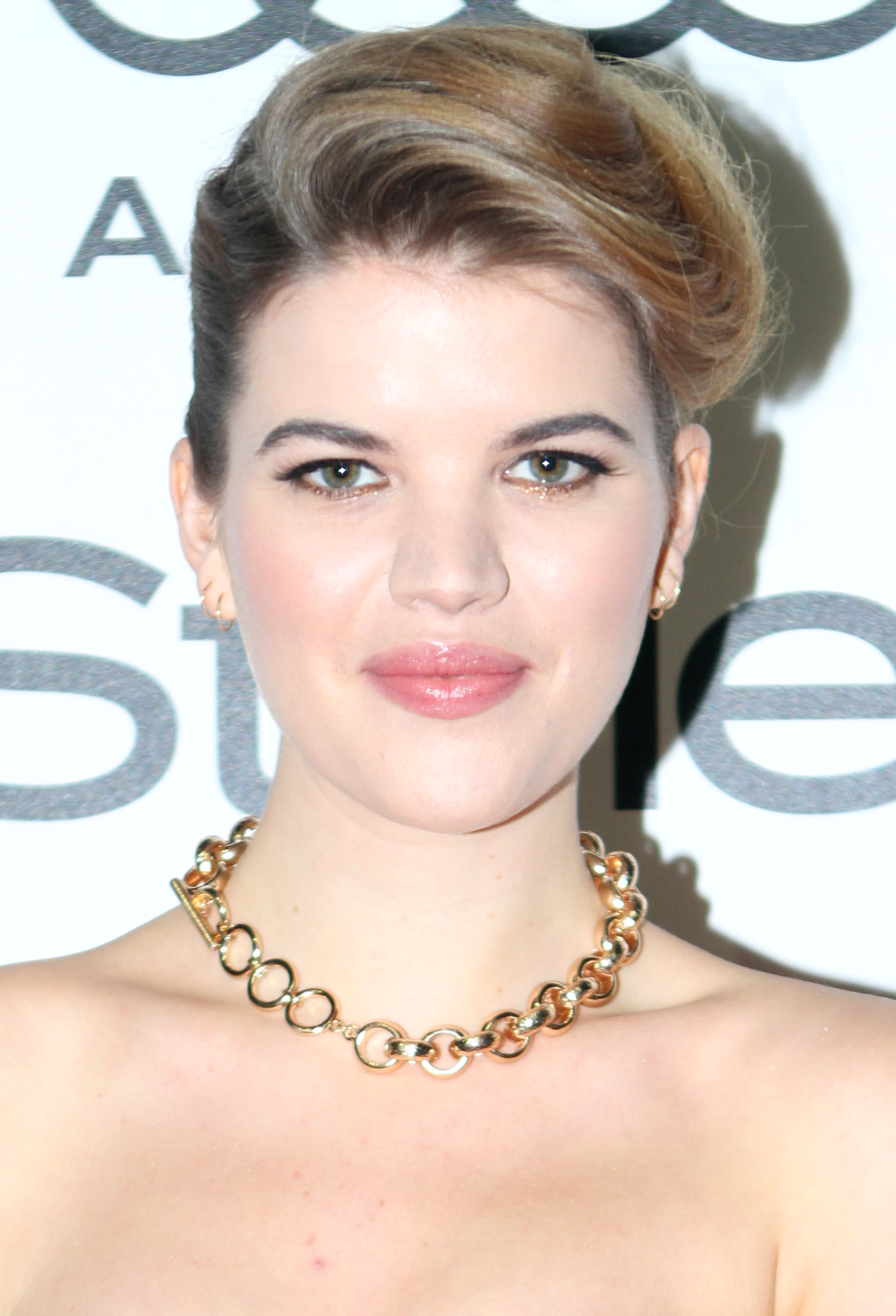
- Birdsall at the InStyle Awards, May 2015

Background information
- Born: 21 January 1992 (age 33) Sydney
- Genres: Jazz, soul, blues
- Instrument(s): Vocals, piano
- Years active: 2012–present
- Labels: Independent
- Website: emmabirdsall.com.au

Emma Birdsall (born 21 January 1992) is an Australian singer-songwriter from Sydney. She was a participant in the first season of The Voice, and placed in the top 16. Since then she has signed with Island Records Australia under the Universal Music Group, with her debut album set to be released in 2016. Her debut single, titled "Lovers & Friends", was released 16 August 2013. Birdsall has a recurring role in Nine Network's drama Love Child, in which she also features on the soundtrack.

== Career ==
She came to fame in 2012 as a finalist in Team Seal of The Voice Australia.

=== Performances ===
Performed	Song	Original artist	Result
Blind Audition	"Mercy"	Duffy	Defaulted Team Seal
Battle Rounds	"At Last" (against Casey Withoos)	Etta James	Winner
Live Show Final, Part 1	"I Never Loved a Man (The Way I Love You)"	Aretha Franklin	Public vote
Live Show Final, Part 3	"The Look of Love"	Dusty Springfield	Eliminated
Live Show Final, Part 3	Kiss From a Rose (as part of Team Seal)	Seal	Eliminated

Following The Voice, Birdsall released "Lovers & Friends" and several songs in the following years through the soundtrack of Channel 9's hit drama Love Child (TV series). She has also spent time doing stage shows internationally (Barbie in 'Barbie...I Can Be', Indonesia) and locally (playing Miriam Aarons in 'The Women', Edgewise Productions for Sydney Fringe Festival). Birdsall is also a talented songwriter, having penned songs for Australian artists Jessica Mauboy, Dami Im, Taylor Henderson and Nathaniel.

== Discography ==
=== Extended plays ===
Title	EP details
Day By Day	Released: 30 October 2020; Label: Emma Birdsall; Format: digital download, streaming

=== Singles ===
Year	Title
2013	"Lovers & Friends"
