= Karen Lee Andrews =

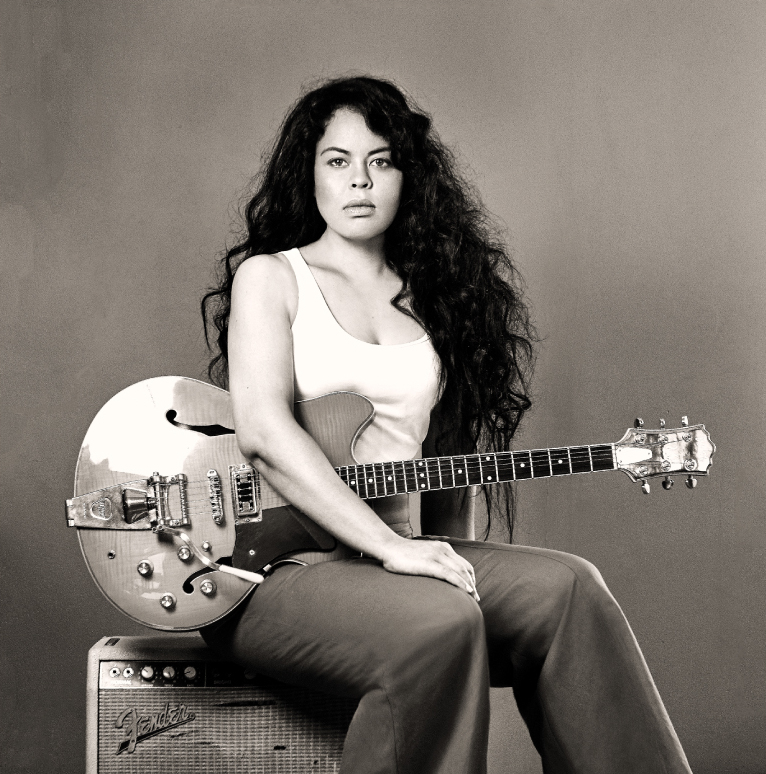
- Andrews in 2018

Background information
- Also known as: Ms Murphy
- Born: 27 October 1981 (age 44); Wollongong, New South Wales, Australia
- Genres: Blues, Soul
- Occupations: singer, songwriter
- Instruments: Vocals, guitar, drums, keys
- Years active: 2013–present
- Label: N/A
- Website: https://karenleeandrews.com/

Karen Lee Andrews (born 27 October 1981) is an Australian singer and multi-instrumentalist, formerly known by her stage name Ms Murphy.

== Career ==
Andrews appeared as finalist on the second season of The Voice in 2013.

Andrews debut EP, White Dress and the Spirit, was released in January 2014. This was followed by Stride in October 2014.

Andrews debut album Dirty Soul Live from the Rec Studio was released on 8 August 2015. It debuted at number 73 on the Australian ARIA Albums Chart and at number 2 on the ARIA Jazz Album Charts.

In 2018, Andrews released Far From Paradise.

2022 saw Karen Lee Andrews release her 5 track EP EDIN. The EP was produced by Benjamin Rodgers (Jimmy Barnes, Guy Sebastian, Emma Donovan, Cold Chisel).

Andrews has appeared as a support act and backup singer for Australian singer Jimmy Barnes on several occasions, including for the They're Shutting Down Your Town tour in 2019 and the Soul Deep 30 tour in 2022. During Barnes' Soul Deep 30 tour, Andrews sang a duet of Wilson Pickett's "In the Midnight Hour" with Barnes. Prior to singing this song on 16 June Barnes stated that Andrews had been "adopted" by his family, and on 25 June, Barnes complimented Andrews by saying that, while his voice could be loud, the power of her voice made his voice sound "like a fly" at rehearsals.

In 2025, Andrews is scheduled to release the album Survival.

== Discography ==
=== Studio albums ===
Title	Details	Peak chart positions
Title	Details	AUS
Dirty Soul Live from the Rec Studio	Release date: 8 August 2015; Label: Mercury (4737726); Formats: Digital download, CD	73
Survival	Release date: 2025; Label: Karen Lee Andrews; Formats: Digital download, CD	

=== Extended plays ===
Title	Details
White Dress and the Spirit	Release date: January 2014; Label: Universal Music Austria (3755093); Formats: Digital download, CD
Stride	Release date: October 2014; Label: Universal Music Austria (3795959); Formats: Digital download, CD
Far from Paradise	Release date: April 2018; Label: Meerkatz Records; Formats: Digital download, streaming, CD & Vinyl
Edin	Release date: October 2022; Label: Independent release; Formats: Digital download, streaming

== Awards and nominations ==
=== APRA Music Awards ===
The APRA Music Awards were established by Australasian Performing Right Association (APRA) in 1982 to honour the achievements of songwriters and music composers, and to recognise their song writing skills, sales and airplay performance, by its members annually.

Year	Nominee / work	Award	Result	Ref.
2026	"I'm Yours" by Karen Lee Andrews (Karen Lee Andrews)	Most Performed Blues & Roots Work	Nominated	
2026	"Survival" by Karen Lee Andrews (Daniel March / Adam Ventoura)	Most Performed Blues & Roots Work	Won	
