= Emma Pask =

Australian jazz singer (born 1977)

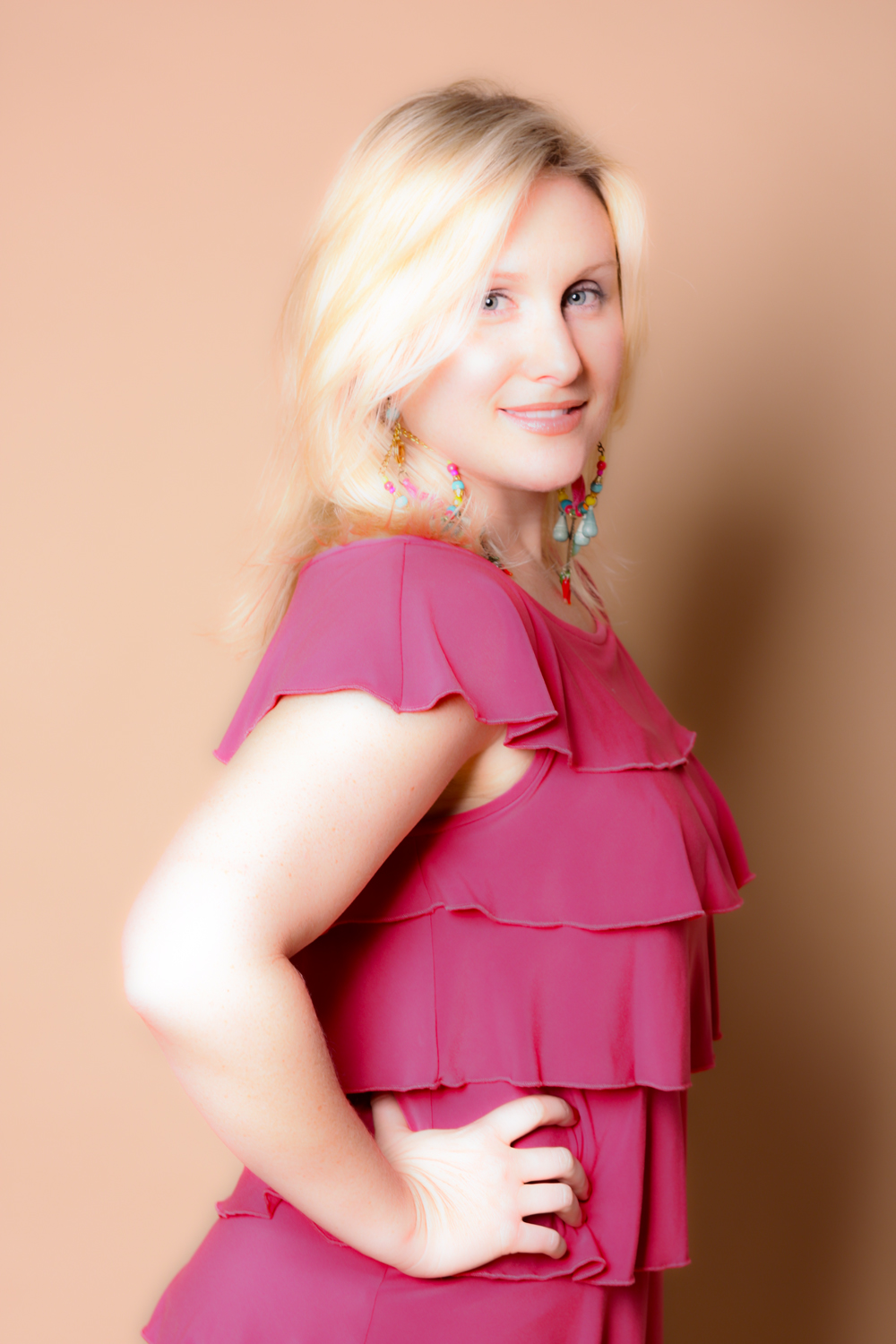

Background information
- Born: Sydney, Australia
- Genres: Jazz
- Occupations: Vocalist, actor
- Instrument: Voice
- Years active: 1994–present
- Labels: Morrison, Rajon Music Group
- Website: Official site

Emma Pask (born 1977) is an Australian jazz vocalist. She is best known for her work with big bands and her continuing collaboration with virtuoso James Morrison.

== Early life ==
Pask grew up in Como, a suburb of Sydney. She attended Como Public School and Kirrawee High School.

While singing with her high school band at 14, Pask was discovered by Morrison at a school performance in 1994 at 16. From then on, she has been the vocal feature of Morrison's bands. She also has a background in acting. In 1995, she undertook a one-year part-time course at the National Institute of Dramatic Art young actor's studio.

She performed for the late Diana, Princess of Wales, Princess Mary of Denmark and in 2006 she had the honour of singing at the wedding of Keith Urban and Nicole Kidman.

== Personal life ==
She is married to Rodrigo Ocaño Da Silva, who is from Uruguay, and they live in Bondi Beach, NSW, Australia.

== Discography ==
=== Albums ===
Title	Details	Peak chart positions
Title	Details	AUS
Emma	Release date: 1999; Label: Morrison; Formats: CD	—
This Madness Called Love	Release date: 2002; Label: Morrison; Formats: CD	—
Accentuate the Positive (with Mark Rivett and The John Morrison Big Band)	Release date: 2003; Label: Rajon Music Group; Formats: CD	—
Some Other Spring	Release date: 2010; Label: Emma Pask; Formats: CD, DD	32
Seasons of My Heart	Release date: 22 November 2013; Label: Mercury; Formats: CD, DD	—
Cosita Divina	Release date: September 2015; Label: Emma Pask; Formats: DD	—
On the Sunny Side of the Street	Scheduled: 15 October 2021; Label: Emma Pask; Formats: DD, streaming	—

=== Charting singles ===
Title	Year	Peak chart positions
Title	Year	AUS
"Mas que Nada"	2013	15

== Awards and nominations ==
=== ARIA Music Awards ===
The ARIA Music Awards is an annual awards ceremony that recognises excellence, innovation, and achievement across all genres of Australian music.

Year	Nominee / work	Award	Result	Ref.
2014	Season of My Heart	Best Jazz Album	Nominated	
2016	Cosita Divina	Best Jazz Album	Nominated	

=== Mo Awards ===
The Australian Entertainment Mo Awards (commonly known informally as the Mo Awards), were annual Australian entertainment industry awards. They recognise achievements in live entertainment in Australia from 1975 to 2016.

Year	Nominee / work	Award	Result (wins only)
2004	Emma Pask	Jazz Vocal Performer of the Year	Won
