= Diana Gordon discography =

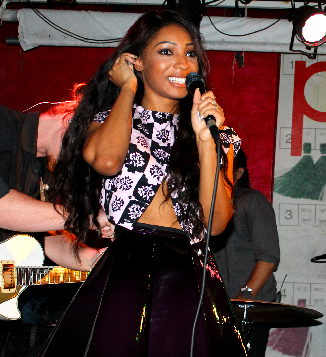
- Gordon performing in 2014
- Studio albums: 1
- EPs: 6
- Singles: 17
- Promotional singles: 6
- Other appearances: 13

American singer-songwriter Diana Gordon has released one studio album, five extended plays, seventeen singles, six promotional singles, nineteen music videos and thirteen other appearances. She began as a writer for other artists, later signing with Atlantic Records where she began working on an album while continuing to write songs for other acts and providing vocals on songs. She released her debut single, "Dirty Talk", on February 17, 2010. It achieved success worldwide, reaching number one on the Australian ARIA Singles Chart and the US Dance Club Songs chart. Her debut album With the Music I Die was released in 2011, and although not managing to chart worldwide, it reached number 25 on the Australian ARIA Albums Chart, and produced three further singles.

In 2012, although still signed to Atlantic Records, Gordon decide to self-release a collection of EPs. The lead single from the first EP, "Stimela", was released on June 20, 2012. The first EP, Human Condition: Doleo was released on July 9, 2012. The second EP, Human Condition: Sanguine, was released on January 15, 2013.

In early 2014, Gordon formed a five-piece band called The Righteous Young, of which she is the lead singer. However, Gordon clarified in a Q&A on Facebook that The Righteous young does not mean the end of Wynter Gordon as an act, but is rather an extension of her own music. She released her first single with The Righteous Young, "Everything Burns", on June 3, 2014. The music video, directed by Harrison Boyce, was exclusively released on Idolator and Vevo on the same day.

On July 22, 2016, Gordon announced that she was no longer using the stage name Wynter Gordon. Instead, she will be going by her birth name, Diana. On July 25 Diana Gordon shared her first single under her own name, "The Legend Of".

== Albums ==
=== Studio albums ===
| Title | Album details | Peak chart positions |
| Title | Album details | AUS |
|---|---|---|
| With the Music I Die | Released: June 17, 2011; Label: Big Beat; Format: CD, digital download | 25 |

== Extended plays ==
| Title | EP details |
|---|---|
| The First Dance | Released: November 9, 2010; Label: Big Beat; Format: Digital download; Track listing: 1. Renegade (featuring Static Revenger); 2. Toyfriend (David Guetta featuring Wynter Gordon); 3. Believer (Freemasons featuring Wynter Gordon); 4. I Feel Love (Rhythm Masters & MYNC featuring Wynter Gordon); 5. Right Here (Famties Remix); 6. Dirty Talk (Denzal Park Remix) |
| With the Music I Die | Released: June 28, 2011; Label: Big Beat; Format: Digital download |
| Human Condition: Doleo | Released: July 9, 2012; Label: The Flying Unicorn; Format: Digital download; Track listing: 1. Giving In; 2. Stimela; 3. Waiting; 4. Kids; 5. Bad Thing; 6. No Hush; 7. Don't Waste Your Time; 8. Nervous (featuring Travis Scott) |
| Sanguine | Released: January 15, 2013; Label: The Flying Unicorn; Format: Digital download; Track listing: 1. Tomorrow; 2. Lucky Ones; 3. TKO (featuring The Oxymorons); 4. Reach Out; 5. Levitate |
| Five Needle | Released: June 2, 2015; Label: Harvest Records; Format: Digital download; Track listing: 1. Bleeding Out; 2. Home; 3. Higher; 4. World on Fire; 5. Against the Time (featuring Vince Staples) |
| Pure | Released: August 3, 2018; Label: Self-release; Format: Digital download; Track listing: 1. Wolverine; 2. Thank You; 3. Kool Aid; 4. Moment to Myself; 5. Too Young |
| Wasted Youth | Released: April 3, 2020; Label: Warner Music Group / Warner Records; Format: Digital download; Track listing: 1. Diana; 2. Rollin; 3. Rollin (Acoustic); 4. Wasted Youth; 5. Sad Boys; 6. Hot Grits; 7. Once A Friend; 8. Tell Myself |

== Singles ==
=== As lead artist ===
| Single | Year | Peak chart positions | | | | | | | | | | Certifications | Album |
| Single | Year | US Dance | AUS | BEL (FL) | BEL (WA) | DEN | FRA | IRE | NZ | SCO | UK | Certifications | Album |
|---|---|---|---|---|---|---|---|---|---|---|---|---|---|
| "Dirty Talk" (as Wynter Gordon) | 2010 | 1 | 1 | 53 | 63 | 33 | 50 | 8 | 2 | 18 | 25 | ARIA: 3× Platinum; BPI: Platinum | With the Music I Die |
| "Til Death" (as Wynter Gordon) | 2011 | 3 | 16 | — | — | — | — | — | — | — | — | ARIA: Gold | With the Music I Die |
| "Buy My Love" (as Wynter Gordon) | 2011 | 2 | 77 | — | — | — | — | — | — | — | — | | With the Music I Die |
| "Still Getting Younger" (as Wynter Gordon) | 2012 | 24 | — | — | — | — | — | — | — | — | — | | With the Music I Die |
| "Everything Burns" (as The Righteous Young) | 2014 | — | — | — | — | — | — | — | — | — | — | | —N/a |
| "Bleeding Out" (as Wynter Gordon) | 2015 | — | — | — | — | — | — | — | — | — | — | | Five Needle |
| "The Legend Of" (as Diana Gordon) | 2016 | — | — | — | — | — | — | — | — | — | — | | —N/a |
| "Woman" (as Diana Gordon) | 2016 | — | — | — | — | — | — | — | — | — | — | | —N/a |
| "Kool Aid" (as Diana Gordon) | 2018 | — | — | — | — | — | — | — | — | — | — | | Pure |
| "Moment to Myself" (as Diana Gordon) | 2018 | — | — | — | — | — | — | — | — | — | — | | Pure |
| "Becoming" (as Diana Gordon) | 2019 | — | — | — | — | — | — | — | — | — | — | | —N/a |
| "Rollin" (as Diana Gordon) | 2020 | — | — | — | — | — | — | — | — | — | — | | Wasted Youth |
"—" denotes single that did not chart or was not released

=== As featured artist ===
| Single | Year | Peak chart positions | | | | | Certifications | Album |
| Single | Year | US | AUS | FRA | IRE | UK | Certifications | Album |
|---|---|---|---|---|---|---|---|---|
| "Sugar" (Flo Rida featuring Wynter) | 2009 | 5 | 20 | 9 | 14 | 19 | CAN: Gold; US: Platinum | R.O.O.T.S. |
| "I Feel Love" (Rhythm Masters & MYNC featuring Wynter Gordon) | 2010 | — | — | — | — | — | | —N/a |
| "Believer" (Freemasons featuring Wynter Gordon) | 2010 | — | — | — | — | 113 | | —N/a |
| "Take Off" (Mr. Vegas featuring Wynter Gordon) | 2011 | — | — | — | — | — | | —N/a |
| "Take Me Away" (Marvin Priest featuring Wynter Gordon) | 2011 | — | 32 | — | — | — | AUS: Gold | —N/a |
| "Ladi Dadi" (Steve Aoki featuring Wynter Gordon) | 2012 | — | — | — | — | — | | Wonderland |
| "Mr. Mister" (Sato Goldschlag featuring Wynter Gordon) | 2012 | — | — | — | — | — | | —N/a |
| "Speak Up" (Laidback Luke featuring Wynter Gordon) | 2012 | — | — | — | — | — | | —N/a |
| "Follow You" (Deniz Koyu featuring Wynter Gordon) | 2012 | — | — | — | — | — | | —N/a |
| "In the Morning" (Robbie Rivera featuring Wynter Gordon) | 2012 | — | — | — | — | — | | Dance or Die: The Album |
| "How to Love" (DJ KOMORI featuring Wynter Gordon) | 2012 | — | — | — | — | — | | —N/a |
| "Surge" (Clockwork featuring Wynter Gordon) | 2013 | — | — | — | — | — | | —N/a |
| "Why Hide" (Mark Ronson featuring Diana Gordon) | 2019 | — | — | — | — | — | | Late Night Feelings |

== Promotional singles ==
| Single | Year | Album |
|---|---|---|
| "Putting It Out There (Pride)" | 2011 | —N/a |
| "Stimela" | 2012 | Human Condition: Doleo |
| "TKO" (featuring The Oxymorrons) | 2012 | Human Condition: Sanguine |
| "Tomorrow" | 2012 | Human Condition: Sanguine |
| "Lucky Ones" | 2012 | Human Condition: Sanguine |
| "The Hard Way" | 2015 | Love the Free Vol. II |

== Other appearances ==
| Single | Year | Album |
|---|---|---|
| "Testify" (John Cook featuring Diana Gordon) | 2008 | God Conscious |
| "Face Off" (Diana Gordon) | 2008 | God Conscious |
| "Dreamin'" (John Cook featuring Diana Gordon) | 2008 | God Conscious |
| "Mirrors (Be Myself Again)" | 2008 | God Conscious |
| "Haters (Break It Off)" (Diana Gordon) | 2008 | God Conscious |
| "Unify" | 2008 | Meet the Browns |
| "Toyfriend" (David Guetta & Afrojack featuring Wynter Gordon) | 2009 | One Love |
| "The Graduation Song" (Kinetics & One Love featuring Wynter Gordon) | 2010 | —N/a |
| "Airborne" (Diggy Simmons featuring Wynter Gordon) | 2010 | Airborne |
| "Next Level" (Rohff featuring Wynter Gordon) | 2010 | La Cuenta |
| "For the Fame" (Tyga featuring Chris Brown & Wynter Gordon) | 2012 | Careless World: Rise of the Last King |
| "Sign Language" (Kinetics & One Love featuring Wynter Gordon) | 2012 | You Are Not Alone |
| "Keep Cool" (Major Lazer featuring Shaggy and Wynter Gordon) | 2013 | Free the Universe |
| "Zodiac Princess" (Brady Watt featuring Big Yuki and Wynter Gordon) | 2015 | Lifetronics |

== Writing credits ==
The following songs have been written by Wynter Gordon, but do not include her as a lead or featured vocal artist.

| Year | Artist | Album | Title |
|---|---|---|---|
| 2005 | Mary J. Blige | The Breakthrough | "Gonna Breakthrough" |
| 2008 | Danity Kane | Welcome to the Dollhouse | "2 of You" |
| 2011 | Jennifer Lopez | Love? | "(What Is) Love?" |
| 2011 | Jennifer Lopez | Love? | "Starting Over" |
| 2011 | Jennifer Lopez | Love? | "Everybody's Girl" |
| 2012 | Dream Beats | —N/a | "Love Stuck" (featuring THE F△CE) |
| 2013 | Ciara | Ciara | "Livin' It Up" (featuring Nicki Minaj) |
| 2013 | Angel Haze | Dirty Gold | "Black Synagogue" |
| 2013 | Travis Garland | Travis Garland | "Clouds" |
| 2015 | A-Trak & Zoofunktion | —N/a | "Place on Earth" |
| 2015 | Selena Gomez | —N/a | "Broken Promises (Demo)" |
| 2016 | Beyoncé | Lemonade | "Don't Hurt Yourself" (featuring Jack White) |
| 2016 | Beyoncé | Lemonade | "Sorry" |
| 2016 | Beyoncé | Lemonade | "Daddy Lessons" |
| 2016 | Rebecca Ferguson | Superwoman | "Without a Woman" |
| 2016 | Zeds Dead | Northern Lights | "Lights Out" (featuring Atlas) |
| 2016 | Eric Bellinger | Eventually | "Repeat" |
| 2017 | Fergie | Double Dutchess | "Tension" |
| 2017 | Valentino Khan | —N/a | "Gold" (featuring Sean Paul) |
| 2017 | Somewhere Else | —N/a | "All the Way" |
| 2017 | Somewhere Else | —N/a | "Uh Huh" |
| 2017 | Brent Faiyaz | Sonder Son | "All I Want" |
| 2018 | Chloe x Halle | The Kids Are Alright | "The Kids Are Alright" |
| 2018 | Silk City (Diplo & Mark Ronson) | —N/a | "Electricity" (featuring Dua Lipa) |
| 2019 | Diplo | —N/a | "So Long" (featuring Cam) |
| 2019 | Mark Ronson | Late Night Feelings | "Truth" (featuring Alicia Keys & The Last Artful, Dodgr) |
| 2020 | Jessica Simpson | —N/a | "Free Will" |
| 2020 | JoJo | Good to Know | "X (1 Thing Wrong)" |
| 2021 | Brent Faiyaz | —N/a | "Show U Off" |
| 2022 | Steve Lacy | Gemini Rights | "Helmet" |
| 2022 | Steve Lacy | Gemini Rights | "Bad Habit" |
| 2026 | Ravyn Lenae | Blue Island | "Wish You Well" |

== Music videos ==
| Title | Other performer(s) | Director(s) | Album | Year | Ref. |
|---|---|---|---|---|---|
| "Sugar" | Flo Rida | TBC | R.O.O.T.S. | 2009 | |
| "Dirty Talk" | —N/a | Armen Djerrahian | With the Music I Die | 2010 | |
| "I Feel Love" | Rhythm Masters & MYNC | TBC | —N/a | 2010 | |
| "Believer" | Freemasons | Sarah Chatfield | —N/a | 2010 | |
| "Dirty Talk" | —N/a | Sarah Chatfield | With the Music I Die | 2010 | |
| "Til Death" | —N/a | Adam Donald | With the Music I Die | 2011 | |
| "Take Me Away" | Marvin Priest | Tara Razavi | Beats & Blips | 2011 | |
| "Buy My Love" | —N/a | Bec Stupak | With the Music I Die | 2011 | |
| "Ladi Dadi" | Steve Aoki | Josh Forbes | Wonderland | 2012 | |
| "Speak Up" | Laidback Luke | TBC | —N/a | 2012 | |
| "Still Getting Younger" | —N/a | Dan Eckman | With the Music I Die | 2012 | |
| "Stimela" | —N/a | Wynter Gordon | Human Condition: Doleo | 2012 | |
| "In the Morning" | Robbie Rivera | TBC | Dance or Die: The Album | 2012 | |
| "Follow You" | Deniz Koyu | TBC | —N/a | 2012 | |
| "TKO" | —N/a | Adam Donald | Human Condition: Sanguine | 2012 | |
| "Mr. Mister" | Sato Goldschlag | Aaron A | —N/a | 2013 | |
| "Everything Burns" | The Righteous Young | Harrison Boyce | —N/a | 2014 | |
| "The Hard Way" | —N/a | DREAMTIGER | Love the Free Vol. II | 2015 | |
| "Bleeding Out" | —N/a | Anthony Leonardi | Five Needle | 2015 | |
| "Kool Aid" | —N/a | Diana Gordon & Billy Walsh | Pure | 2018 | |
| "Becoming" | —N/a | Maxime Quoilin | TBA | 2019 | |
| "Kerosene!" | Yves Tumor | Cody Critcheloe | Heaven to a Tortured Mind | 2020 | |
