= Nicole Morier =

American singer-songwriter and producer (born 1982)

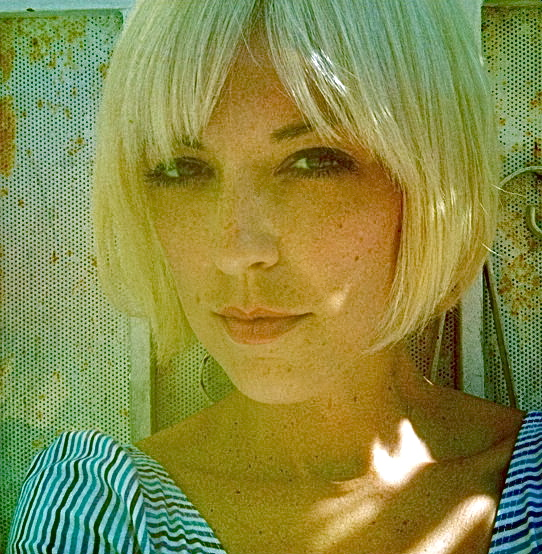
- Morier in 2011

Background information
- Also known as: Coco Morier
- Born: Nicole Louise Morier
- Origin: Los Angeles, California, U.S.
- Genres: Pop, electropop, dance-pop
- Occupations: Singer-songwriter, producer
- Instruments: Vocals, guitar
- Years active: 2002–present
- Labels: INGRID; Gummizelle
- Website: www.cocomorier.com

Nicole Louise "Coco" Morier is an American singer-songwriter and producer. She began her career in 2002 as one half of the electronic rock duo Electrocute before becoming a songwriter for artists including Britney Spears, Tom Jones, Selena Gomez, Ellie Goulding, Demi Lovato, and Icona Pop. Her best-known compositions include "Heaven on Earth" and "How I Roll", recorded by Britney Spears, the latter of which was named the #1 song of 2011 by Rolling Stone.

As a songwriter Nicole has collaborated with the world's top songwriters and producers including Max Martin, Ryan Tedder, Stargate, and Bloodshy and Avant.

== Biography ==
Morier was born in San Francisco but moved as a small child to Cedar Crest, New Mexico. Her father Johnny Morier, was a folk musician and songwriter who'd written a few minor hits for bands in the Sixties, including Spanky and Our Gang's top 10 "Makin' Every Minute Count", The Cowsills' "Yesterday's Girl" and Sam the Sham and the Pharaohs' "Banned in Boston". He had also spent time playing the local folk circuit in Greenwich Village, NYC and had befriended musicians such as Joan Baez and Taj Mahal whom Nicole met as a child. With her father she began singing in churches and local venues and she learned to play an array of instruments.

Nicole first considered pursuing a career as a songwriter for other artists in 2006 when talking with musician-songwriter Greg Kurstin, while working on Electrocute's song "Bikini Bottom" for the SpongeBob SquarePants Movie soundtrack in Los Angeles. Kurstin had just begun writing songs for pop artists and introduced her to his publisher.

Morier soon after signed with music publishers Kobalt. and landed her first cut when "Heaven on Earth", a song she'd co-written with Freescha, was recorded by Britney Spears for her album Blackout.

== Work ==
In 2009-2010 Morier toured as lead guitarist and backing vocalist with Charlotte Gainsbourg from 2009-2010.

In 2011, Morier released a self-titled solo EP as "Coco Morier." The five-song extended play album contains production from Miike Snow members Christian Karlsson and Pontus Winnberg as well as Freescha and Magnus Lidehall.

In 2012, Morier began the artist collective INGRID along with Miike Snow, Peter Bjorn and John, Lykke Li, members of the Teddybears and others.

Morier collaborated with Nick Ebeling on the Gunwolf Comic Book Soundtrack which was released through her label INGRID in October 2013. She executive-produced the album and contributed as writer and producer of 7 of the 16 tracks. The soundtrack was released as a package containing the first edition of Gunwolf Comic Book and a limited-edition tape cassette and later on picture disc.

In March 2014, Morier signed to OneRepublic vocalist and songwriter Ryan Tedder's publishing company Patriot Games in a joint deal with Brill Building Songs and Kobalt Music Publishing.

Shoe designer Jerome C. Rousseau as a fan of her music named two shoes from his fall collection of 2015 the "Coco" and the "Morier".

In 2016, V magazine called her "one of pop's best kept secrets" on the release of her debut solo album.

Morier composed the all original music for "For the Love of a Glove: An Unauthorized Musical Fable About the Life of Michael Jackson As Told By His Glove" which opened January 2020 in Los Angeles, California along with co-composers Drew Erickson and Max Townsley. The lyrics and book were written by the shows director Julien Nitzberg. Choreography was by Cris Judd and Bryan Anthony. Cris Judd was Michael Jackson's former lead dancer on the HIStory World Tour. It was the premiere production at the Carl Sagan and Ann Druyan Theater in Los Angeles.

Andrew Limbong on NPR’s Weekend Edition called the show “Raunchy, surreal and absurd... While For the Love of a Glove isn't a hagiographic jukebox musical, it also isn't interested in tearing Michael Jackson down completely.” In his interview with him, Nitzberg told NPR, "He's the King of Pop... And theater usually deals with flawed kings, flawed gods, etc."

== Discography ==
=== Songwriting discography ===
Year	Artist	Album	Song written
2007	Britney Spears	Blackout	"Heaven on Earth"
2008	Britney Spears	Circus	"Mmm Papi"
2008	Britney Spears	Circus	"Rock Me In"
2008	Junkie XL	Booming Back at You	"Mad Pursuit"
2008	Junkie XL	Booming Back at You	"New Toy"
2008	Junkie XL	Booming Back at You	"Not Enough"
2008	Tom Jones	24 Hours	"Seen That Face"
2008	Tom Jones	24 Hours	"If He Should Ever Leave You"
2008	Tom Jones	24 Hours	"Take Me Back To The Party"
2010	Wynter Gordon	With the Music I Die	"Dirty Talk"
2010	Aeroplane	We Can't Fly	"We Can't Fly"
2010	Aeroplane	We Can't Fly	"I Don't Feel"
2010	Aeroplane	We Can't Fly	"Without Lies"
2010	Miranda Cosgrove	Sparks Fly	"Charlie"
2010	Hyper Crush	—N/a	"Kick Us Out"
2011	Data Romance	Data Romance EP	—N/a
2011	Wynter Gordon	With the Music I Die	"Buy My Love"
2011	Selena Gomez & the Scene	When the Sun Goes Down	"Whiplash"
2011	Sky Ferreira	As If!	"99 Tears"
2011	Miranda Cosgrove	High Maintenance	"Sayonara"
2011	Britney Spears	Femme Fatale	"How I Roll"
2011	Britney Spears	Femme Fatale	"Trip To Your Heart"
2011	Lena	Good News	"Taken by a Stranger"
2012	Icona Pop	Icona Pop	"We Got the World"
2012	Gemini	—N/a	"3D Romeo" (featuring Fabienne)
2012	Nause	—N/a	"Hungry Hearts"
2012	Sarah De Bono	No Shame	"No Shame"
2014	Ace Wilder	The Wildcard	"Riot"
2014	Namie Amuro	—N/a	"Sweet Kisses"
2015	Ellie Goulding	Delirium	"Keep On Dancin'"
2015	Demi Lovato	Confident	"Wildfire"
2015	Galantis	Pharmacy	"Dancin' to the Sound of a Broken Heart"
2016	Momoiro Clover Z	Hakkin no Yoake	"Rock the Boat"
2017	The Beaches	Late Show	"Give It Up"
2017	The Beaches	Late Show	"Gold"
2017	The Beaches	Late Show	"Sweet Life"
2017	Hayley Kiyoko	Citrine	"Ease My Mind"
2018	Hayley Kiyoko	Expectations	"Expectations"
2018	Hayley Kiyoko	Expectations	"Under The Blue/Take Me In"
2018	Hayley Kiyoko	Expectations	"Molecules"
2019	The Beaches	The Professional	"Fascination"
2019	The Beaches	The Professional	"Desdemona"
2019	The Beaches	The Professional	"Want What You Got"
2019	Ava Max	Heaven & Hell	"Salt"
2019	Lexie Liu	2030	"Love and Run"
2020	Rina Sawayama	Sawayama	"Comme des Garçons (Like the Boys)"
2020	Rina Sawayama	Sawayama	"Love Me 4 Me"
2020	Rina Sawayama	Sawayama	"Bees & Honey"
2020	Charli XCX & Galantis	Song for Super Nintendo World	"We Are Born To Play"

=== Solo discography ===
==== Albums ====
Title	Details
Dreamer	Released: July 7, 2016; Label: AWAL; Format: Digital download

==== Extended plays ====
Title	Details
Coco Morier	Released: April 6, 2011; Label: Self-released; Format: Digital download
Strangers May Kiss	Released: June 18, 2012; Label: INGRID; Format: Digital download
Perfect People	Released: July 30, 2019; Label: Gummizelle; Format: Digital download

==== Singles ====
Title	Year	Album
"No Pressure"	2016	Dreamer
"Dreamer"	2016	Dreamer
"State of Love" (featuring Lula The Beat)	2019	Non-album single
"Daytime Parties" (featuring The Lady Tigra)	2019	Non-album single
"After Hours"	2020	Non-album single

==== Guest appearances ====
List of non-single guest appearances, with other performing artists
Title	Year	Other artist(s)	Album
"Afterlife"	2012	—N/a	INGRID Volym 1
"Sex and Violence"	2013	Max Von Sydow	Gunwolf: Get Ready to Get Killed (Original Soundtrack)
"Monster Therapy"	2013	The Criminals	Gunwolf: Get Ready to Get Killed (Original Soundtrack)
"Glamour Tits"	2013	The Criminals; Zoobombs	Gunwolf: Get Ready to Get Killed (Original Soundtrack)
"Synth Pagoda"	2013	The Criminals	Gunwolf: Get Ready to Get Killed (Original Soundtrack)
"I Get What I Want"	2013	Max Von Sydow	Gunwolf: Get Ready to Get Killed (Original Soundtrack)
"Touch of Gold"	2015	Julian Hamilton	INGRID Volym 2.1
"Heart Attack"	2017	Oliver, De La Soul	Full Circle
"Bees & Honey"	2020	Rina Sawayama	Sawayama (Deluxe)

=== Electrocute discography ===
Full-length albums and EPs

- 2003 - Tribute to Your Taste
- 2005 - Troublesome Bubblegum
- 2008 - On the Beat
- 2009 - Double Diamond

Singles

- 2003 - "Sugar Buzz"
- 2005 - "Shag Ball"
- 2005 - "Cops Copulating"
- 2008 - "Bad Legs"
- 2008 - "On The Beat"
- 2008 - "Mad Pursuit"

Other appearances

- 2004 - "Bikini Bottom" (on The SpongeBob SquarePants Movie soundtrack)
- 2008 - "Mad Pursuit" (Junkie XL featuring Electrocute) (on 21 soundtrack)
