= No Shame =

No Shame may refer to:

- No Shame (film), a 2001 Spanish film
- No Shame (Pepper album), 2006
- No Shame (Sarah De Bono album), 2012
- No Shame (Hopsin album), 2017
- No Shame (Lily Allen album), 2018
- "No Shame" (Sarah De Bono song), 2012
- "No Shame" (5 Seconds of Summer song), 2020

== See also ==
- No Shame Theatre, a theatrical "open mic" event
- No Shame, No Fear, a 2003 novel by Ann Turnbull
- Shame (disambiguation)
