= No Hard Feelings (The Beaches album) =

2025 studio album by the Beaches

Studio album by The Beaches
- Released: August 29, 2025
- Length: 34:07
- Label: AWAL
- Producer: 300it; Riley Bell; Zale Epstein; Georgia Flipo; Aidan Hogg; Chris LaRocca; Lowell; Gus van Go; Sam Willows

The Beaches chronology
Blame My Ex (2023)	No Hard Feelings (2025)

Singles from No Hard Feelings
- 1. "Takes One to Know One" Released: July 12, 2024; 2. "Jocelyn" Released: September 18, 2024; 3. "Last Girls at the Party" Released: April 2, 2025; 4. "Did I Say Too Much" Released: May 28, 2025; 5. "Touch Myself" Released: June 26, 2025; 6. "Lesbian of the Year" Released: August 14, 2025

No Hard Feelings is the third studio album by the Canadian rock band the Beaches. It was released under AWAL on August 29, 2025, as the follow-up to their previous album, Blame My Ex (2023). The album has been preceded by the release of six singles: "Takes One to Know One", "Jocelyn", "Last Girls at the Party", "Did I Say Too Much", "Touch Myself", and "Lesbian of the Year". To promote No Hard Feelings, the Beaches embarked on the No Hard Feelings Tour, which took place in North America between August and November 2025, followed by a UK and European leg in February 2026.

The album was longlisted for the 2026 Polaris Music Prize.

== Background and release ==
In 2023, the Canadian rock band the Beaches released the album Blame My Ex. They gained commercial success with the track "Blame Brett", which went viral. The album won the Juno Award for Rock Album of the Year at the Juno Awards of 2024, and was shortlisted for the 2024 Polaris Music Prize. The Beaches also received the award for Juno Award for Group of the Year in 2024 and 2025. They then released the singles "Takes One To Know One" and "Jocelyn" in July and September 2024, respectively.

On April 2, 2025, the Beaches announced their following album's title, No Hard Feelings, its 11-song track listing, and released the single "Last Girls At The Party" alongside a music video directed by Laura-Lynn Petrick. As part of the early promotion of the record, the band hosted events in North America and Europe, and played at several festivals, including Coachella and Osheaga. "Did I Say Too Much" was released as the album's fourth single on May 28, 2025. No Hard Feelings was released on August 29, 2025, under AWAL. It is supported by the No Hard Feelings Tour in North America, which began in Chicago on August 29, 2025, and concluded in Moncton on November 15. A UK and European tour of the same name followed in February 2026.

== Track listing ==
All tracks are written by Leandra Earl, Eliza Enman-McDaniel, Jordan Miller, and Kylie Miller, with additional writers noted.

No Hard Feelings track listing
No.	Title	Writer(s)	Producer(s)	Length
1.	"Can I Call You In the Morning?"	Elizabeth Boland; Gus van Go	Van Go; Lowell	2:52
2.	"Did I Say Too Much"	Zale Epstein; Karah McGillivray; Sam Willows	Van Go; Willows	3:08
3.	"Sorry for Your Loss"	300it; Riley Bell; Boland; Chris LaRocca; Savannah Rae	Van Go; Lowell; 300it; LaRocca; Bell	3:01
4.	"Touch Myself"	Ryland Blackinton; Justin Tranter	Van Go	3:09
5.	"Fine, Let's Get Married"	Boland; Van Go	Van Go; Lowell	3:30
6.	"Takes One to Know One"	Boland; Van Go	Van Go; Lowell	2:48
7.	"I Wore You Better"	Boland; Van Go	Van Go; Lowell	2:29
8.	"Dirty Laundry"	David Fischer; Van Go	Van Go	3:23
9.	"Lesbian of the Year"	Epstein; Willows	Van Go; Willows; Epstein	3:33
10.	"Jocelyn"	Boland; Van Go	Van Go; Lowell	3:32
11.	"Last Girls at the Party"	Georgia Flipo; Aidan Hogg	Van Go; Hogg; Flipo	2:42
Total length:				34:07

== Personnel ==
Credits adapted from Tidal.

=== The Beaches ===
- Leandra Earl – electric guitar
- Eliza Enman-McDaniel – drums
- Jordan Miller – lead vocals, bass guitar
- Kylie Miller – electric guitar

=== Additional contributors ===
- Gus van Go – mixing, engineering
- Ryan Morey – mastering
- 300it – engineering
- Chris LaRocca – engineering
- Lowell – engineering
- Riley Bell – engineering
- Ryland Blackinton – engineering
- Sam Willows – engineering

== Charts ==
Chart performance for No Hard Feelings
Chart (2025)	Peak position
Belgian Albums (Ultratop Flanders)	95
Canadian Albums (Billboard)	38
UK Album Downloads (OCC)	50
UK Independent Albums (OCC)	41
US Top Album Sales (Billboard)	48
