= Late Show (Beaches album) =

Studio album by The Beaches
- Released: October 13, 2017
- Studio: Noble Street Studios (Toronto); Giant Recording Studio (Toronto)
- Genre: Rock
- Length: 39:26
- Label: Island
- Producer: Emily Haines; Jimmy Shaw

The Beaches chronology
| Heights (2014) | Late Show (2017) | The Professional (2019) |

Singles from Late Show
- 1. "Money" Released: August 15, 2017; 2. "T-Shirt" Released: April 10, 2018

Late Show is the debut studio album by the Canadian rock band the Beaches. Produced by Metric members Emily Haines and Jimmy Shaw, it was released by Island Records on October 13, 2017. The album was supported by the singles "Money" and "T-Shirt", the latter achieving number one on the Billboard Canada Rock chart. The album helped to earn the band the 2018 Juno Award for Breakthrough Group of the Year, alongside a nomination for the 2018 SOCAN Songwriting Prize for "Money".

== Track listing ==
| No. | Title | Writer(s) | Length |
|---|---|---|---|
| 1. | "Back of My Heart" | Jordan Miller; Kylie Miller; Leandra Earl; Eliza Enman-McDaniel | 3:43 |
| 2. | "Money" | J. Miller; K. Miller; Earl; Enman-McDaniel; Garrett Lee | 3:16 |
| 3. | "Moment" | J. Miller; K. Miller; Earl; Enman-McDaniel | 2:46 |
| 4. | "Let Me Touch" | J. Miller; K. Miller; Earl; Enman-McDaniel; Bram Inscore | 2:53 |
| 5. | "T-Shirt" | J. Miller; K. Miller; Earl; Enman-McDaniel | 3:06 |
| 6. | "Turn Me On" | J. Miller; K. Miller; Earl; Enman-McDaniel | 3:04 |
| 7. | "Gold" | J. Miller; K. Miller; Earl; Enman-McDaniel; Nicole Morier; Lee | 3:46 |
| 8. | "Highway 6" | J. Miller; K. Miller; Earl; Enman-McDaniel | 4:41 |
| 9. | "Late Show" | J. Miller; K. Miller; Enman-McDaniel; James Quinn | 3:01 |
| 10. | "Keeper" | J. Miller; K. Miller; Earl; Enman-McDaniel | 2:49 |
| 11. | "Walk Like That" | J. Miller; K. Miller; Earl; Enman-McDaniel | 3:28 |
| 12. | "Sweet Life" | J. Miller; K. Miller; Earl; Enman-McDaniel; Morier | 2:53 |
