= No Shame (Sarah De Bono album) =

Sarah De Bono

Studio album by Sarah De Bono
- Released: 13 July 2012
- Recorded: 2012
- Studio: Studios 301 (Sydney)
- Genre: Pop
- Length: 32:32
- Label: Mercury, Universal
- Producer: Eric J. Dubowsky, Stuart Crichton

Singles from Sarah De Bono
- 1. "No Shame" Released: 29 June 2012

No Shame is the debut studio album by Australian recording artist Sarah De Bono, who finished fourth on the first season of The Voice (Australia). The album was released on 13 July 2012, through Universal Music Australia. It features songs De Bono performed on The Voice, original songs "No Shame" and "Beautiful", as well as newly recorded covers. To promote the album, De Bono visited the Westfield Knox in Wantirna South, Victoria, where she performed two songs from the album and signed CD copies for fans. The album debuted at number seven on the ARIA Albums Chart.

== Singles ==
The album's title track "No Shame" was released as the lead single on 29 June 2012. It peaked at number 50 on the ARIA Singles Chart.

Promotion

To promote the album four promotional singles were released for download including beautiful

De bono also promoted the album by supporting kelly clarkson on the Australian leg of her stronger tour.

== Track listing ==
No.	Title	Writer(s)	Producer(s)	Length
1.	"Price Tag" (Jessie J cover)	Jessica Cornish, Lukasz Gottwald, Claude Kelly, Bobby Ray Simmons Jr.	Eric J. Dubowsky	3:20
2.	"Heavy Cross" (Gossip cover)	Mary Patterson, Nathan Howdeshell, Hannah Blilie	Dubowsky	2:47
3.	"Listen" (Beyoncé cover)	Henry Krieger, Scott Cutler, Anne Preven, Beyoncé Knowles	Dubowsky	3:36
4.	"How Will I Know" (Whitney Houston cover)	George Merrill, Shannon Rubicam, Narada Michael Walden	Dubowsky	3:51
5.	"Here's Where I Stand" (Tiffany Taylor cover)	Michael Gore, Lynn Ahrens	Dubowsky	3:11
6.	"If I Didn't Love You" (Tina Arena cover)	Tina Arena, Pam Reswick, Steve Werfel	Dubowsky	4:31
7.	"Beautiful"	Sarah De Bono, Jhay Cabrera	Dubowsky	2:23
8.	"No Shame"	Nicole Morier, Magnus Lidehall, Vincent Pontare, Seinabo Sey	Dubowsky, Stuart Crichton	3:34
9.	"Burn" (Usher cover)	Usher Raymond, Jermaine Dupri, Bryan-Michael Cox	Dubowsky	3:50
10.	"Warwick Avenue" (Duffy cover)	Jimmy Hogarth, Aimee Duffy, Francis White	Dubowsky	3:47

== Charts ==
Chart (2012)	Peak position
ARIA Albums Chart	7

== Release history ==
Region	Date	Format	Label
Australia	13 July 2012	CD, digital download	Universal Music Australia
