= Robbie Rivera =

Puerto Rican DJ and record producer

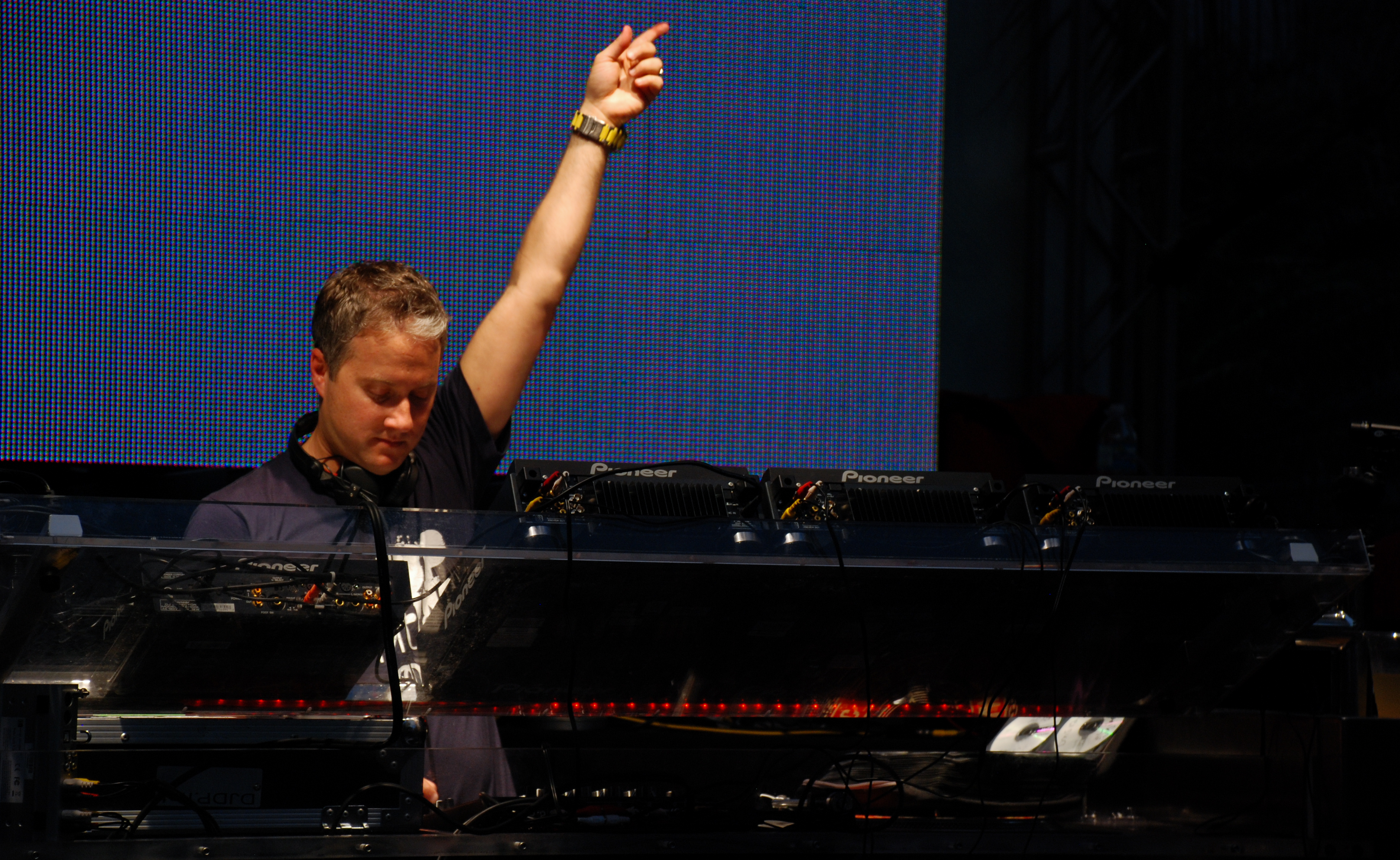
- Rivera performing in 2009

Background information
- Also known as: 68 Beats
- Born: Roberto Luis Rivera; August 7, 1973 (age 53); San Juan, Puerto Rico
- Origin: Puerto Rico
- Genres: Electro; house; dance; funk; tribal; progressive house
- Years active: 1996–present
- Labels: Juicy; Virgin; EMI
- Website: robbierivera.com

Roberto "Robbie" Rivera (born August 7, 1973) is a Puerto Rican house music producer and DJ. He has an extensive catalog of original productions and remixes to his credit, ranging from tribal to progressive house, as well as incorporating garage and Latin elements. He and his wife Mónica Olabarrieta have homes in Miami and Ibiza. On October 28, 2009, DJ Magazine announced the results of their annual Top 100 DJ Poll, with Rivera placing number 95.

== Biography ==
=== Early years (1986–1999) ===
Rivera grew up in Puerto Rico, and was a fan of freestyle and Eurobeat when he bought two turntables to teach himself DJing techniques. Rivera performed at weddings and school party gigs, eventually leading to nightclubs aged 16. After high school graduation, Rivera attended The Art Institute of Fort Lauderdale to study music production and was introduced to many different digital audio tools including the popular Pro Tools program. While in college he released his first record, "El Sorullo", a track influenced by Latin house music. The track became popular in New York City and Miami and his career was underway.

=== Rise to fame (2000–present) ===
In 2000, Rivera's track "Bang" became a huge hit, peaking at number 9 in the United Kingdom dance chart. The track also made it on to several dance compilation albums and was used frequently during the 2000 Sydney Olympics. The song became popular enough that it gave Rivera some face time on Top of the Pops and MTV. Rivera started his own label, Juicy Records, and recorded mix CDs for Max Music, Filtered, and others. Rivera produced his first album Do You Want More? for Ultra Records and Independence in France. The first single "Which Way You're Going" reached the number one position on the U.S. Hot Dance Club Songs chart and was released on the UK label Toolroom. The track was created in early 2003 when Rivera contacted lyricist Ned Bigham, Jean-Jacques Smoothie and Timo Maas; it was the first completed song and lead track which was inspired by Coldplay's hit "Clocks". In 2003, he also released his track "Girlfriend" which featured vocals by Justine Suissa. During 2007, Rivera's Juicy Show began weekly airplay on XM Satellite Radio (now Sirius XM Radio) in the United States and Canada. Today, Rivera's Juicy radio show can be heard on radio stations around the world, including (but not limited to): Radio FG, Contact FM and Fun Radio (France); Dero FM (Argentina); Vibe FM (Romania); Novoe Radio FM (Belarus); 105FM and various FM frequencies (Italy); Loca FM (Spain); Turkish Side FM (Cyprus); Risfe FM (Hungary); Radiovolum Digital (Norway); various FM frequencies (Brazil); Dance FM (Morocco).

In 2008, he made a collaboration with Armani Exchange by mixing an album called Twilight for the store.

Rivera's branded Juicy-themed DJ shows have a following of club-goers that number in the thousands at each show; the most well known of these parties is Juicy Beach, occurring at the oceanfront Nikki Beach Club venue in South Beach, Miami, every year during WMC (Winter Music Conference).

Rivera appears as the featured producer on the track "In The Morning" on Wynter Gordon's debut album With The Music I Die.

== Discography ==
=== Albums ===
The following list contains studio albums produced by Robbie Rivera.

- 2005 Do You Want More?
- 2008 Star Quality
- 2009 Closer to the Sun
- 2011 Dance or Die Series 1
- 2018 Twenty

=== Extended plays ===
This list contains extended plays by Robbie Rivera, his aliases and co-productions.

- 1996 Another State of Mind EP Vol. 1
- 1997 Mad Music EP Vol. 1
- 1997 The Prime Time EP
- 1998 Step Into My Grooves Vol. 1
- 1999 Crazy Mother EP Vol. 1
- 1999 Robbie Rivera Tools Vol. 1
- 1999 The Beat Bandit EP
- 1999 Crazy Mother EP Vol. 2
- 1999 Crazy Mother EP Vol. 3
- 1999 Essential Grooves Part 1
- 2000 The Secret Agent Adventures Part 1
- 2000 The Secret Agent Adventures Part 2
- 2001 Heavy Soul Part 1
- 2001 Robbie Rivera EP Part 1
- 2001 Rough Ride EP
- 2004 Funktown EP
- 2005 Miami EP
- 2005 Miami EP Vol. 2
- 2005 Robbie Rivera Tools Vol. 2
- 2020 In the Air

=== Singles ===
This list contains singles by Robbie Rivera, his aliases and co-productions. It does not contain singles which were remixed.

- 1996 "These Are the Sounds in the House!"
- 1997 "I Wanna Feel It Deeper"
- 1998 "Getting Down with the Sax"
- 1998 "I Wanna See You Groovin'"
- 1998 "Funking & Grooving"
- 1998 "Attention"
- 1998 "Enough Is Enough"
- 1998 "Intense"/"Feel This"
- 1998 "The Kings of Tribal"
- 1998 "Key of Life"
- 1998 "Not Just a Dub"
- 1998 "Nothing to Offer"
- 1998 "The Ultimate Disco Groove"
- 1998 "There's Some Disco Fans in Here Tonight"
- 1999 "Bringing It Down"
- 1999 "Clap Your Hands"
- 1999 "Club Wash"
- 1999 "D-Monsta"
- 1999 "Listen Up"
- 1999 "First the Groove"
- 1999 "French Fries from Miami Beach"
- 1999 "High Energy"
- 1999 "It's a Feeling Now"
- 1999 "It's Midnight"
- 1999 "Relax"
- 1999 "Saxmania"
- 1999 "Sunny South"
- 1999 "The Frenzy"
- 1999 "The Music Makers"
- 1999 "The Soul Bandit"
- 1999 "Rainforest 1999"
- 1999 "The Real Sound"
- 1999 "Tough Enough"
- 2000 "Bang"
- 2000 "Do You Believe"/"I'm the Music Tonite"
- 2000 "Fallin'"
- 2000 "I Can't Take It"
- 2000 "I'm the Music Tonite"
- 2000 "The One"
- 2001 "Feel This"
- 2001 "Funk-a-Tron"
- 2001 "In the Distance"
- 2002 "Burning"
- 2002 "Hypnotize"
- 2002 "Let's Get Together"
- 2002 "Sex"
- 2002 "Sound Xpress"/"Congos"
- 2002 "Super Drum"
- 2002 "The Hum Melody"
- 2002 "Trippin"
- 2003 "All That I Like"
- 2003 "Bringing It Down"
- 2003 "Girlfriend"
- 2003 "Gonna Let the Music Move You Around"
- 2003 "Got to Let You Know"
- 2003 "I Want More"
- 2003 "Insanity"
- 2003 "The Bang"
- 2003 "Vertigo"
- 2003 "Sound the Horn"
- 2004 "Blah Blah Blah"
- 2004 "Funk-a-Faction"
- 2004 "Liar"
- 2004 "Which Way You're Going"
- 2004 "Uptown Girls / Do You Want More?"
- 2005 "One Eye Shut"
- 2005 "Right Here"
- 2006 "Bizarre Love Triangle"
- 2006 "Escape"
- 2006 "Float Away"
- 2006 "Superstar"
- 2006 "The Dubai Track"
- 2006 "Your Mistake"
- 2007 "Replay the Night"
- 2007 "Aye Aye Aye"
- 2007 "Bring Back the Underground"
- 2007 "Rock It"
- 2007 "Move Move"
- 2007 "No Nobody"
- 2008 "Back to Zero"
- 2008 "In Too Deep"
- 2008 "Girlfriend 2008"
- 2009 "Closer To The Sun"
- 2010 "Let Me Sip My Drink" featuring Fast Eddie
- 2010 "Rock the Disco"
- 2010 "We Live for the Music"
- 2010 "Oh Baby" featuring Dero and Juan Magan
- 2010 "Keep On Going"
- 2011 "The Sound of the Times" featuring Ana Criado
- 2011 "Ding Dong" featuring Sue Cho
- 2012 In The Morning featuring Wynter Gordon
- 2015 "Falling Deeper" featuring Shawnee Taylor
- 2017 Stardust Featuring Linney
- 2018 "Everything"
- 2018 "Tribal Man"
- 2018 "All Night"
- 2019 "You Can Have Everything"
- 2019 "My Body Moves" featuring Elizabeth Gandolfo
- 2019 "Money" with Georgia Train
- 2019 "Stronger" with Abel Di Catarina
- 2019 "Wake Up" with S-Man
- 2019 "Musique" with Nxny
- 2019 "Everything That You Want" with The Cabas
- 2019 "Saxxy"
- 2019 "One" featuring Dreamfreak
- 2019 "This Generation"
- 2020 "House Party" with Tommy Capretto
- 2020 "Change" with Georgia Train
- 2020 "Banter" with She Koro
- 2020 "Dreaming"
- 2021 "Get Me Out Of Here"
- 2021 "Switch It"
- 2021 "Don't Delete Me"
- 2022 "The Pulse" with David Tort
- 2022 "La Vecina" with David Tort featuring Lyon Monster

==== Remixes ====
- 2001: Victoria Beckham — "Not Such An Innocent Girl" (Robbie Rivera's Main Mix)
- 2019: Audax — "Rave All Night" (Robbie Rivera and Benny Camaro Remix)
- 2019: Wateva — "Tell Me" (Robbie Rivera Remix)
- 2019: Robbie Rivera — "Stronger" (Robbie Rivera Remix)
- 2019: Dave Winnel — "Smoke Machine" (Robbie Rivera Remix)
- 2019: Tommy Capretto — "House Is A Feeling" (Robbie Rivera Remix)
- 2019: The Cube Guys — "Don't Stop" (Robbie Rivera Remix)
- 2020: David Novacek, Dani Mas and Juan Trumpet — "Give Me More" (Robbie Rivera Remix)
- 2020: Basement Jaxx — "Do Your Thing" (Robbie Rivera Juicy Summer Mix)
- 2021: Gold 88 — "Push It" (Robbie Rivera Remix)
- 2021: The Private Language - "Cali Girls" (Robbie Rivera Remix)
- 2021: Horatio - "Killer cut" (Robbie Rivera Remix)

==== Chart positions ====
Year	Title	^{U.S. dance}	^{UK}	^{FIN}
2000	"Bang"	22	13	–
2001	"Feel This 2001"	1	–	–
2002	"Sex"	–	55	–
2003	"The Hum Melody"	1	–	–
2004	"Burning"	1	–	–
2004	"Which Way You're Going"	1	–	–
2007	"Float Away"	–	–	3
"—" denotes a recording that did not chart or was not released.

== Aliases ==
This list contains the names of the aliases used by Robbie Rivera.

- "68 Beats"
- "Anima"
- "D-Monsta"
- "Eighties Phunk Masters"
- "The Freak"
- "Funk Bandit"
- "The Funksters"
- "Invasion"
- "Juice Man"
- "Juicy Tools"
- "Keylime"
- "The Kings of Tribal"
- "Loopman"
- "The Masters of The Drums"
- "Metalhead"
- "Rhythm Bangers"
- "The Rivera Project"
- "Tribal Crew"
- "Westwood Project"
- "Wicked Phunker"
- "DJ Spacecake"
- "Electro Hippy"

== Co-productions ==
This list contains the names of the co-productions of Robbie Rivera with other artists.

- CRRS (with Chicco Secci)
- The Italian Connection (with Maurizio Ruggiero)
- Kolaborators (with Billy Paul Williams)
- The Music Makers (with Chicco Secci)
- Robbie Rivera and AJ Mora Project (with AJ Mora)
- Rockik (with Chicco Secci)
- Soul Logic (with Chicco Secci)
- The Underground (with DMS12)

== See also ==
- List of number-one dance hits (United States)
- List of artists who reached number one on the US Dance chart
