= Blame My Ex =

2023 album by The Beaches

Studio album by the Beaches
- Released: September 15, 2023
- Length: 31:56
- Label: The Beaches
- Producers: Gus van Go; Lowell; Daniel Agee; Sam Jackson Willows

The Beaches chronology
Sisters Not Twins (The Professional Lovers Album) (2022)	Blame My Ex (2023)	No Hard Feelings (2025)

Singles from Blame My Ex
- 1. "Everything Is Boring" Released: April 7, 2023; 2. "Blame Brett" Released: May 5, 2023; 3. "Me & Me" Released: July 21, 2023; 4. "What Doesn't Kill You Makes You Paranoid" Released: August 25, 2023; 5. "Edge of the Earth" Released: February 4, 2024

Blame My Ex is the second studio album by Canadian rock band the Beaches, released on September 15, 2023.

The album was led by the hit single "Blame Brett", which reached number 1 on the Billboard Canada rock charts, and broke through as the band's first charting single in the United States. The song refers to Jordan Miller's prior relationship with Brett Emmons of The Glorious Sons, although Miller clarified that the song was not meant to be perceived as attacking him, but as an apology to future boyfriends for her own struggles to commit to a new relationship. She has stressed that she is the "bad guy" in the song, not Emmons, and has spoken out against fans who tried to vilify Emmons based on the song.

The album peaked at number 76 on the Canadian Albums Chart.

The album won the Juno Award for Rock Album of the Year at the Juno Awards of 2024, and was shortlisted for the 2024 Polaris Music Prize.

== Track listing ==
Blame My Ex track listing
No.	Title	Length
1.	"Blame Brett"	2:57
2.	"What Doesn't Kill You Makes You Paranoid"	3:51
3.	"Me & Me"	2:27
4.	"Everything Is Boring"	2:56
5.	"My Body ft Your Lips"	2:54
6.	"Kismet"	3:03
7.	"Shower Beer"	3:11
8.	"Edge of the Earth"	2:40
9.	"If a Tree Falls"	4:25
10.	"Cigarette"	3:32
Total length:		31:56

== Charts ==
Chart performance for Blame My Ex
Chart (2023)	Peak position
Canadian Albums (Billboard)	76
