= Sarah De Bono =

Australian singer (born 1992)

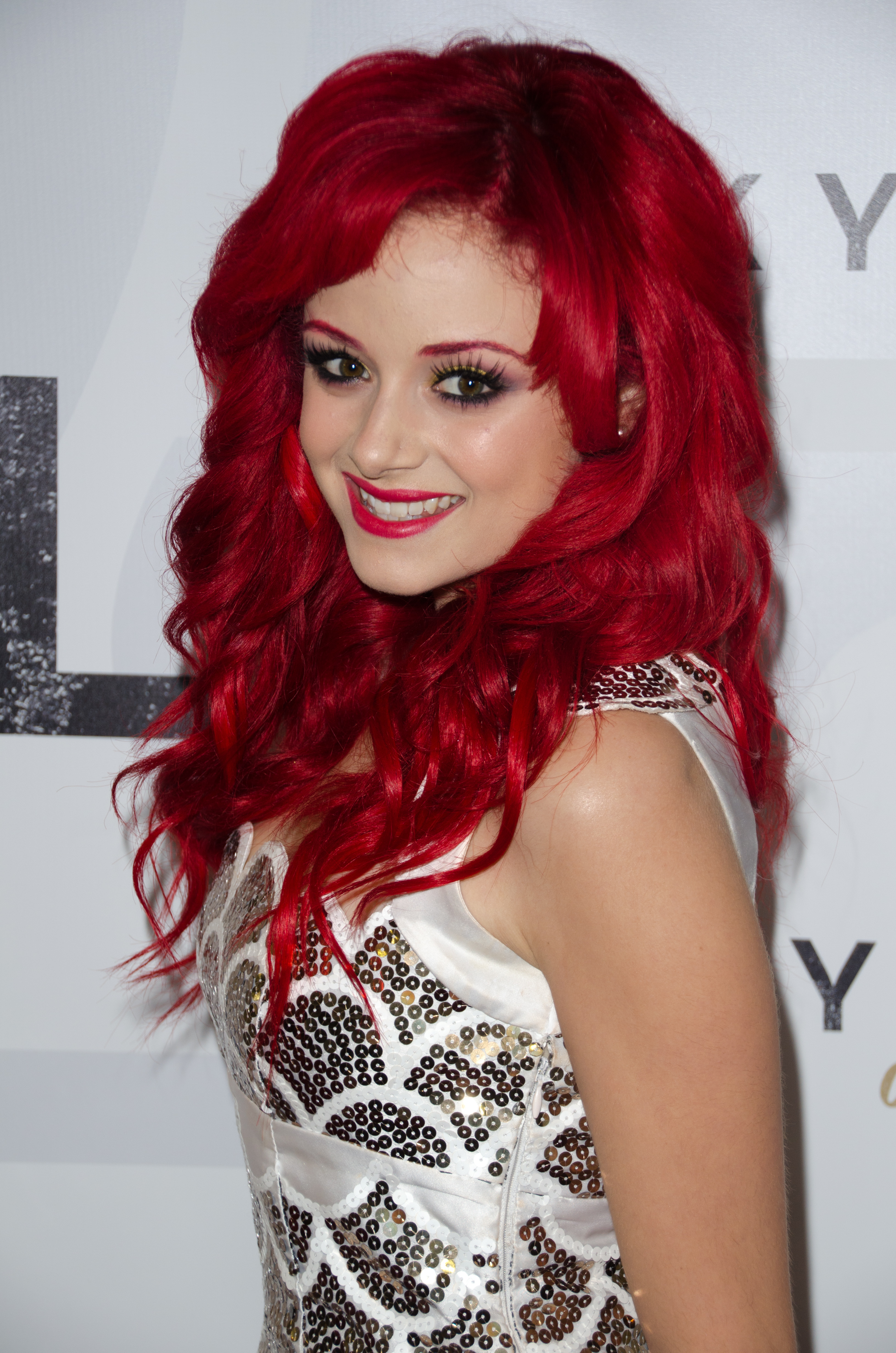
- De Bono at Skyfall premiere in Sydney, in 2012

Background information
- Born: Sarah Renee De Bono; 6 March 1992 (age 34); Melbourne, Australia
- Genres: R&B; pop; soul; dance
- Occupations: Singer; pianist
- Instruments: Vocals; piano
- Years active: 2006–present
- Label: Universal

Sarah Renee De Bono (born 6 March 1992) is an Australian singer and pianist, born and raised in Melbourne. She participated on the first season of The Voice (Australia), coming in fourth place. Shortly after she signed a record deal with Universal Music Australia. On 24 June 2012, De Bono scored her first top 10 hit with "Beautiful", co-written and produced by Jhay C peaking at number four on the ARIA Singles Chart and was certified gold. Her debut album No Shame was released on 13 July 2012, which contained songs she performed on The Voice, as well as newly recorded covers. The album debuted at number seven on the ARIA Albums Chart.

== Life and career ==
=== Early life ===
De Bono grew up in the working-class suburb of Broadmeadows in Melbourne. She also worked as a singing teacher in a school in North Fawkner, Melbourne. In 2007 she won the Brimbank Idol competition after placing second in 2006.

=== 2012: The Voice Australia ===
De Bono auditioned for the first season of The Voice (Australia) and finished in fourth place. After coming in fourth, De Bono received support from her coach Joel Madden and his wife Nicole Richie. De Bono's placing received uproar from fans and viewers.

==== Performances ====
Performed	Song	Original artist	Result
Blind Audition	"Price Tag"	Jessie J	Joined Team Joel
Battle Rounds	"Heavy Cross" (against Yianna Stavrous)	Gossip	Winner
Live Show Final, Part 2	"Listen"	Beyoncé	Public vote
Live Show Final, Part 4	"How Will I Know"	Whitney Houston	Public vote
Live Show Final, Part 4	Dance Floor Anthem (as part of Team Joel)	Good Charlotte	Public vote
Live Show Final, Part 5	"Here's Where I Stand"	Tiffany Taylor	Joel's choice
The Live Finale, Part 1	"If I Didn't Love You"	Tina Arena	4th
The Live Finale, Part 1	"Beautiful" (Note: De Bono performed "Beautiful" an original song written by herself during The Live Finale, Part 1.)	Sarah De Bono	4th
The Live Finale, Part 2	"It Will Rain" (with Joel Madden)	Bruno Mars	4th
The Live Finale, Part 2	The Chain (Note: De Bono performed "The Chain" with Karise Eden, Rachael Leahcar and Darren Percival, also backed up by Team Seal(hi), Team Delta, Team Keith and Team Joel during the results of the Finale.)	Fleetwood Mac	4th

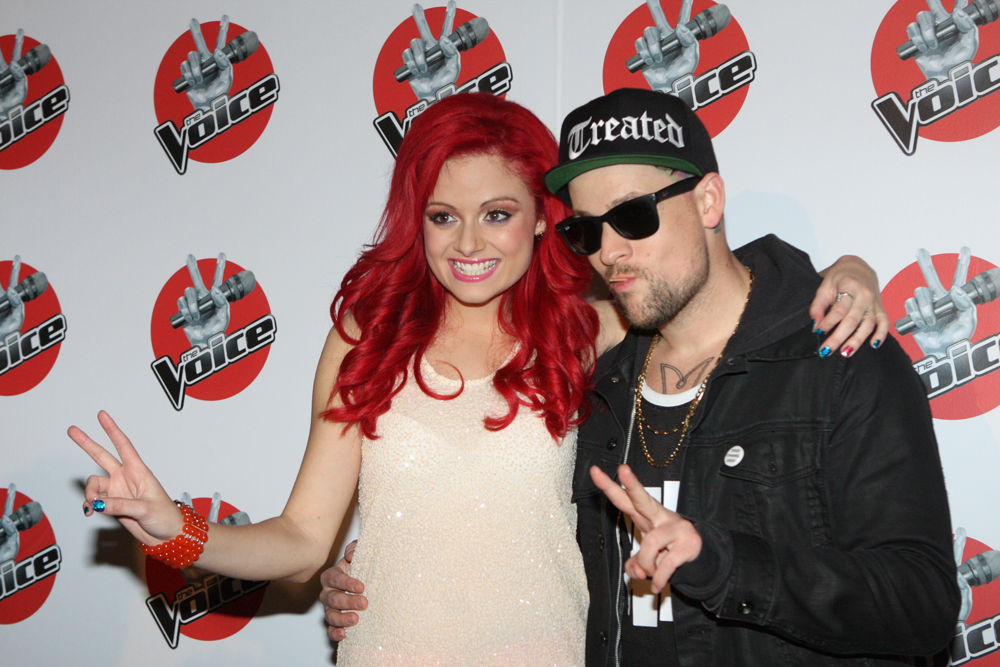
De Bono with her coach and mentor Joel Madden.

=== 2012–present: Record deal, No Shame and upcoming second studio album ===
On 25 June 2012, De Bono's original song "Beautiful", which she debuted on The Voice, charted at number four on the ARIA Singles Chart and was certified gold by the Australian Recording Industry Association (ARIA), for sales of 35,000 copies. Two days later, it was revealed that De Bono had signed a record deal with Universal Music Australia. Her debut single "No Shame", which would have been her winner's single, was released digitally on 29 June 2012. That same day, it was announced that De Bono will be a supporting act for Kelly Clarkson's Australian leg of her Stronger Tour in late September to early October 2012. De Bono's debut album, also titled No Shame, was released on 13 July 2012, which features studio versions of covers she performed on The Voice, original songs, as well as newly recorded covers of Usher's "Burn" and Duffy's "Warwick Avenue". The album debuted at number seven on the ARIA Albums Chart. On 14 August 2012, De Bono revealed to The Daily Telegraph that she was working on her second studio album and hopes to release as early next year. On the new album's direction she said; "I know what I want to write about, it’s just putting those ideas into melodies. It’s going to be fun and uplifting,".

== Discography ==
=== Studio albums ===
Title	Album details	Peak chart positions
Title	Album details	AUS
No Shame	Released: 13 July 2012; Formats: CD, digital download; Label: Universal Music Australia	7

=== Singles ===
Title	Year	Peak chart positions	Album
Title	Year	AUS	Album
"No Shame"	2012	50	No Shame
"Oasis"	2013		TBA

=== Promotional singles ===
Title	Year	Peak chart positions	Certifications	Album
Title	Year	AUS	Certifications	Album
"Listen"	2012	13		No Shame
"How Will I Know"	2012	24		No Shame
"Here's Where I Stand"	2012	30		No Shame
"If I Didn't Love You"	2012	50		No Shame
"Beautiful"	2012	4	ARIA: Gold	No Shame

== Tours ==
Supporting act

- 2012: Stronger Tour (Kelly Clarkson)
