= The Beaches (band) =

Canadian rock band

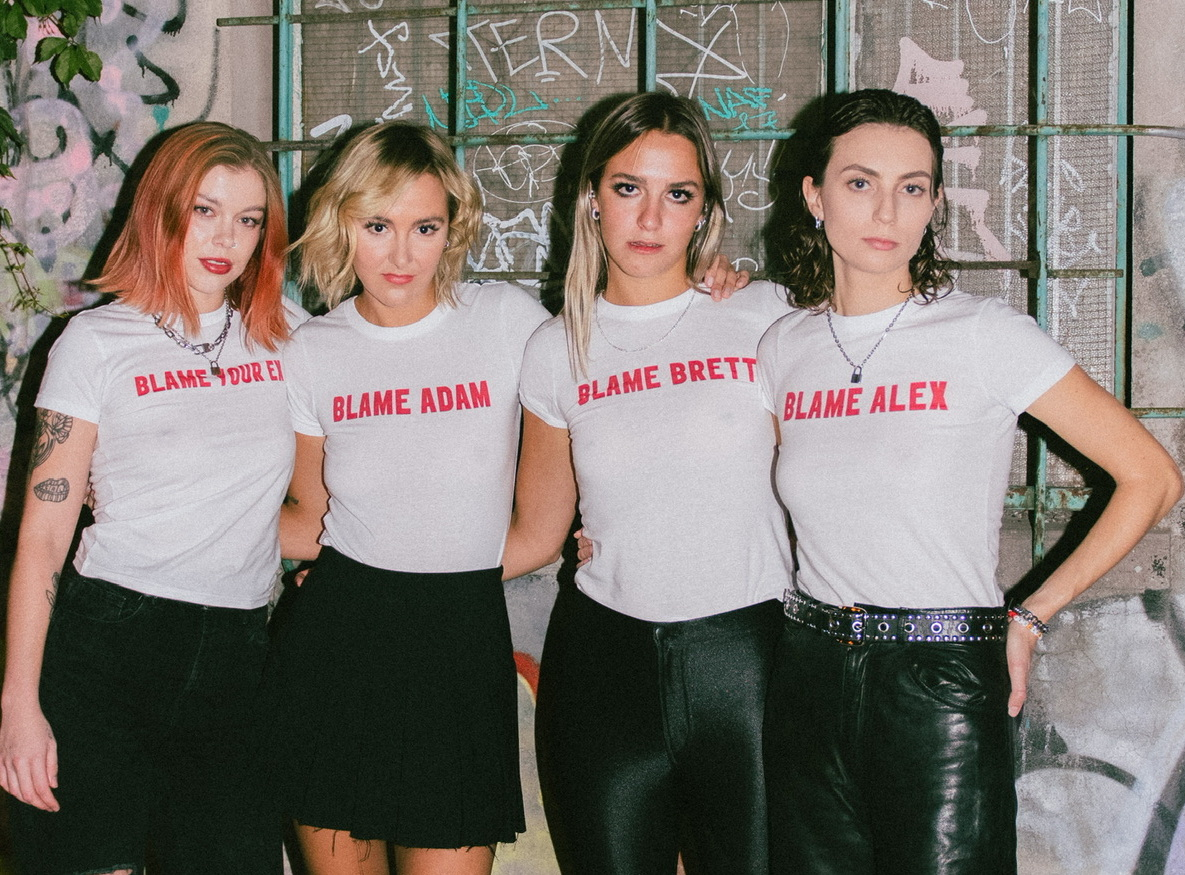
- The Beaches at the release party for their album Blame My Ex in 2023; left to right: Eliza Enman-McDaniel, Kylie Miller, Jordan Miller and Leandra Earl

Background information
- Also known as: Done with Dolls (2009–2013)
- Origin: Toronto, Ontario, Canada
- Genres: Indie rock; dance rock; pop rock
- Years active: 2009–present
- Labels: AWAL, Universal Records (former)
- Members: Jordan Miller; Kylie Miller; Eliza Enman-McDaniel; Leandra Earl
- Past members: Megan Fitchett

The Beaches are a Canadian rock band formed in Toronto in 2009 by Jordan Miller (lead vocals, bass), Kylie Miller (guitar, backing vocals), Leandra Earl (keyboards, guitar, backing vocals), and Eliza Enman-McDaniel (drums). The band released two EPs titled The Beaches (2013) and Heights (2014) before signing to Universal Records. In 2017, they released their debut album Late Show, which led to the band winning the 2018 Juno Award for Breakthrough Group of the Year.

To follow their debut, they released two further EPs called The Professional (2019) and Future Lovers (2021). A 2022 compilation album Sisters Not Twins (The Professional Lovers Album) combined their previous two EPs and won that year's Juno Award for Rock Album of the Year. Their second studio album Blame My Ex was released via AWAL on September 15, 2023. Their third studio album, No Hard Feelings, was released on August 29, 2025. They won the 2024, 2025 and 2026 Juno Award for Group of the Year.

== History ==
=== Formation, name change and early EPs (2009–2016) ===
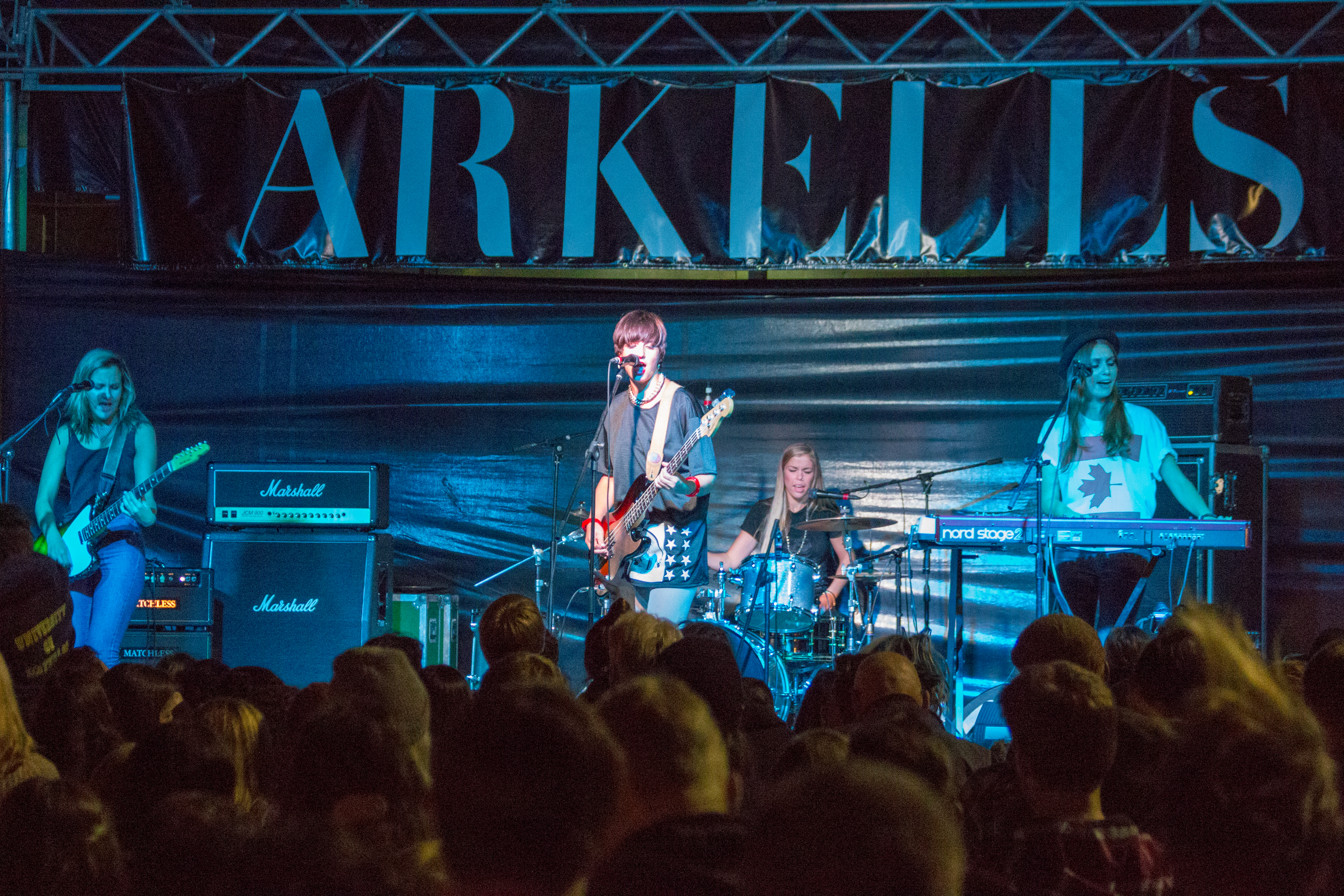
The Beaches performing at Supercrawl, opening for Arkells in Hamilton, On. in September 2014

In their early teens, sisters Jordan and Kylie Miller joined drummer Eliza Enman-McDaniel and guitarist Megan Fitchett to form the pop punk quartet Done with Dolls in their hometown of Toronto. The band undertook a tour in 2011 opening for Allstar Weekend, and performed the theme song to the Family Channel teen sitcom Really Me. By 2013, Fitchett had left the group, after which the remaining members added new guitarist Leandra Earl (from Toronto's Little Italy neighbourhood) and renamed themselves The Beaches after the affluent Toronto neighbourhood where the Millers and Enman-McDaniel grew up. They also adopted a more alternative rock sound and released two EPs, The Beaches (2013) and Heights (2014). The band signed to Universal Records in 2016.

=== Late Show (2017–2018) ===
The Beaches released their debut full-length studio album Late Show in 2017. The album was produced by Emily Haines and James Shaw of Metric and was supported by two singles, "Money" and "T-Shirt". The latter peaked at No. 1 on the Billboard Canada Rock chart and was certified Gold by Music Canada in 2021. The band won Breakthrough Group of the Year at the 2018 Juno Awards. Later that year, they received a SOCAN Songwriting Prize nomination for their song "Money".

=== The Professional and Future Lovers EPs (2019–2022) ===
In 2019, The Beaches released their third EP, The Professional. It was accompanied by the singles "Fascination" and "Snake Tongue". They toured Canada, opening for The Glorious Sons and Passion Pit. They were chosen as the opening act for the only Canadian stop on the Rolling Stones' 2019 No Filter Tour. Later that year, they appeared as the on-field pre-game entertainment before the kick-off of the 107th Grey Cup in Calgary. They later announced a 2020 headlining tour of Canada, which was cut short due to the COVID-19 pandemic, with their final shows of the tour being three sold-out nights headlining the Danforth Music Hall.

In 2021, they released their fourth EP, Future Lovers. This was accompanied by the singles "Let's Go" and "Blow Up". The EP consisted of songs originally intended for their forthcoming second album that they had decided to release sooner. They also announced the 2022 Future Lovers Tour, which spanned 20 dates across Canada and featured The Blue Stones as special guests. The band combined their two most recent EPs into a compilation album called Sisters Not Twins (The Professional Lovers Album), which won the Juno Award for Rock Album of the Year in 2022. Later that year, the band left Island Records and independently released the singles "Grow Up Tomorrow", "Orpheus", and "My People". They also changed managers that year, who advised them "Your music is just too rock, and rock music doesn’t stream... If you made the records 20% more pop, I think people would open their arms to you.”

=== Blame My Ex and No Hard Feelings (2023–present) ===
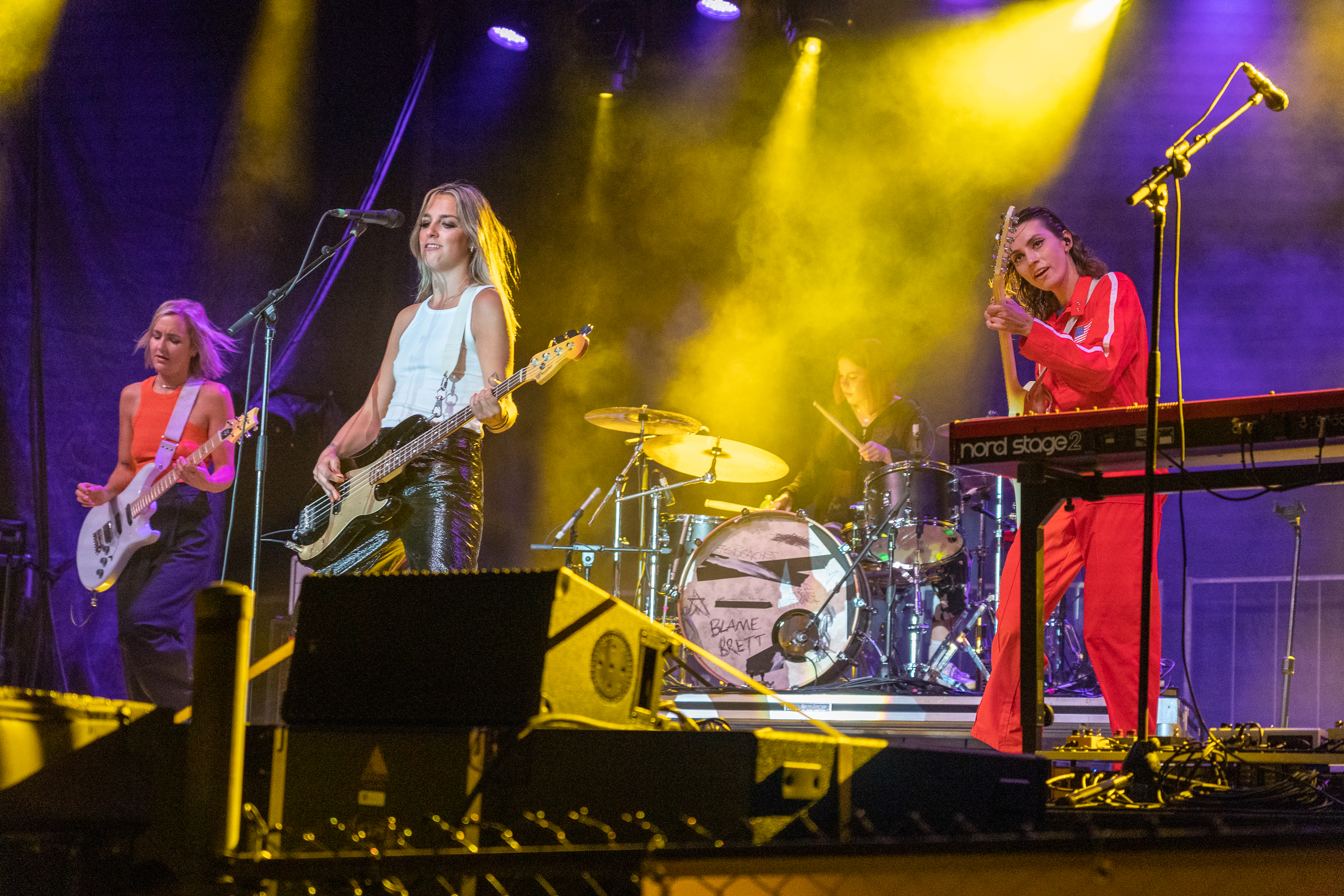
The Beaches in 2023

The Beaches announced their second album, Blame My Ex, would be released in September 2023. They released "Blame Brett", the first single from the album, on May 5, 2023. The song was based on the breakup of lead singer Jordan and Brett Emmons from The Glorious Sons and was co-written and co-produced by Gus Van Go and Lowell. The song was described by Billboard Canada as "poppier than their previous releases, with the heavy guitar tones swapped for reverb". The song went viral on TikTok, leading to an increase of streaming of the band's catalogue and became the band's second number one on Billboard's Canada Rock chart, totaling four weeks in the top position. Additionally, the song received airplay on various SiriusXM channels before being picked up by American terrestrial radio stations.

The band embarked on a North American tour in 2023, including a performance at that year's Lollapalooza. Due to the success of "Blame Brett", the tour was mostly sold out and the song had introduced the band to a younger audience than their previous work. On July 17, 2024, the band opened for The Rolling Stones at Levi's Stadium in Santa Clara.

Blame My Ex was released on September 15, 2023 via AWAL and peaked at number 76 on the Billboard Canadian Albums chart, the band's first appearance on the chart. The album won the Juno Award for Rock Album of the Year at the Juno Awards of 2024, and was shortlisted for the 2024 Polaris Music Prize. On August 22, the band headlined their biggest hometown show in Toronto to a sold-out crowd at the Budweiser Stage, where they debuted the new song, "Jocelyn".

On April 2, 2025, the band released the single "Last Girls at the Party", as well as announcing their third studio album, No Hard Feelings, which was released on August 29, 2025. To support the release of No Hard Feelings, the band began the No Hard Feelings Tour in North America, which began in Chicago on August 29, 2025, and concluded in Moncton on November 15. A UK and European tour of the same name followed in February 2026. The band performed at the festival All Things Go in Toronto in June 2026. No Hard Feelings was selected as one of the 40 best Canadian albums of 2026 and long-listed for the Polaris Music Prize.

The band made their debut at Coachella in 2025. The Coachella set list and "Edge of the Earth" were subsequently referenced and featured in the second episode of the 2026 Amazon Prime series Off Campus. The band subsequently went viral on social media, resulting in a significant number of online streams and the band gaining over 5 million new monthly listeners on Spotify. Around the same time, the Beaches also served as an opener for Louis Tomlinson on his How Did We Get Here? World Tour.

== Band members ==
The Beaches live at Norfolk County Fairground Festival 2023

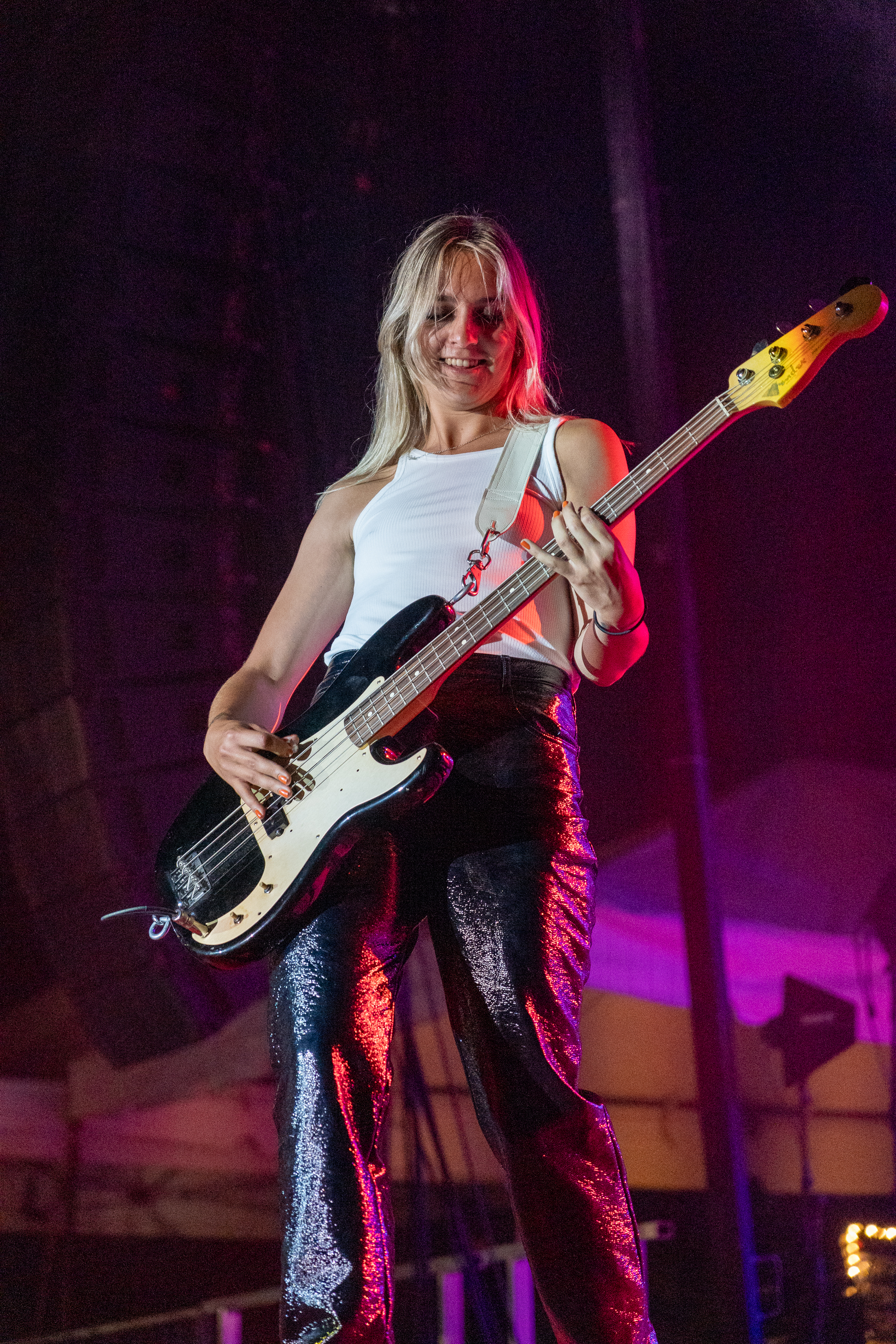
Jordan Miller

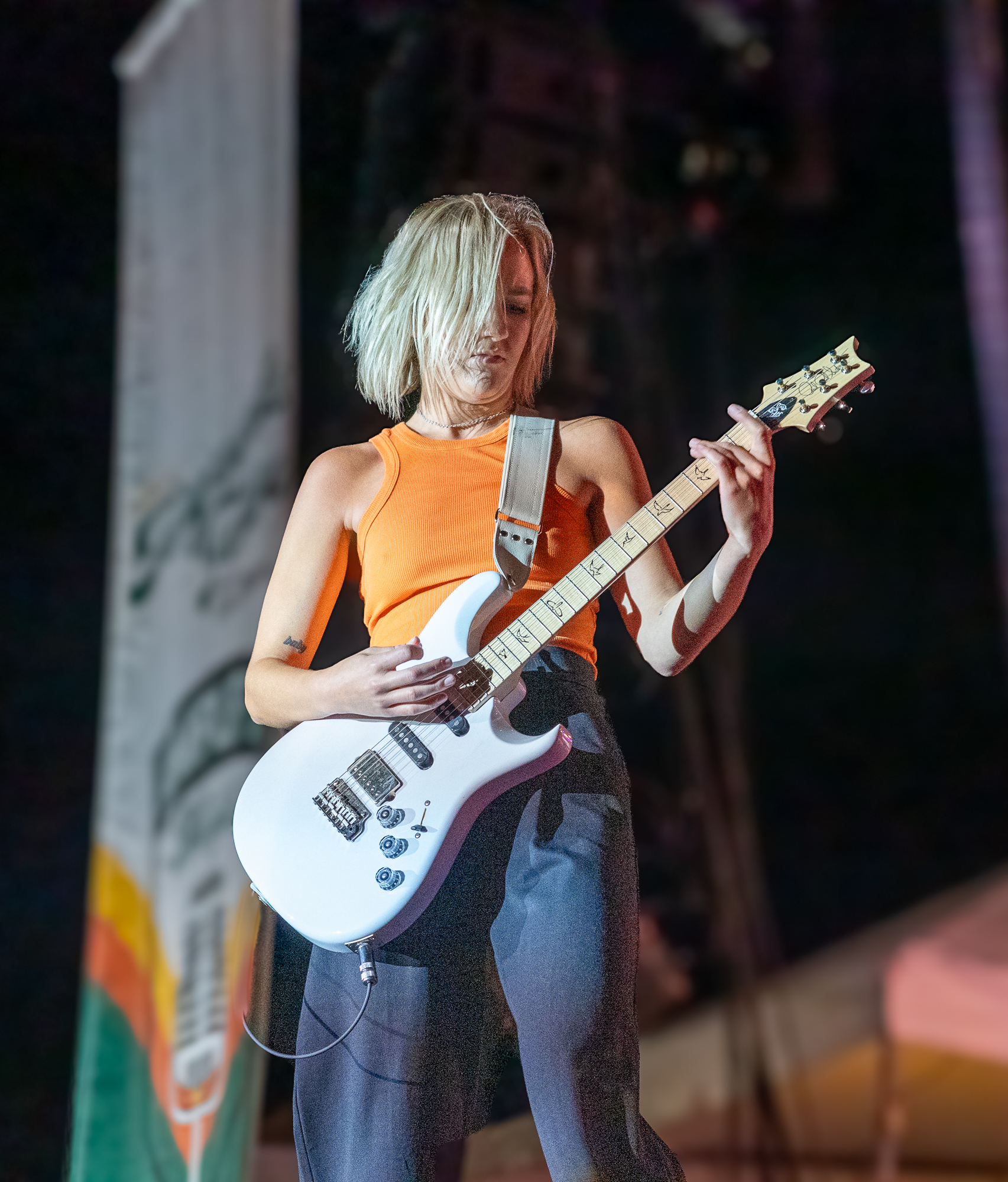
Kylie Miller

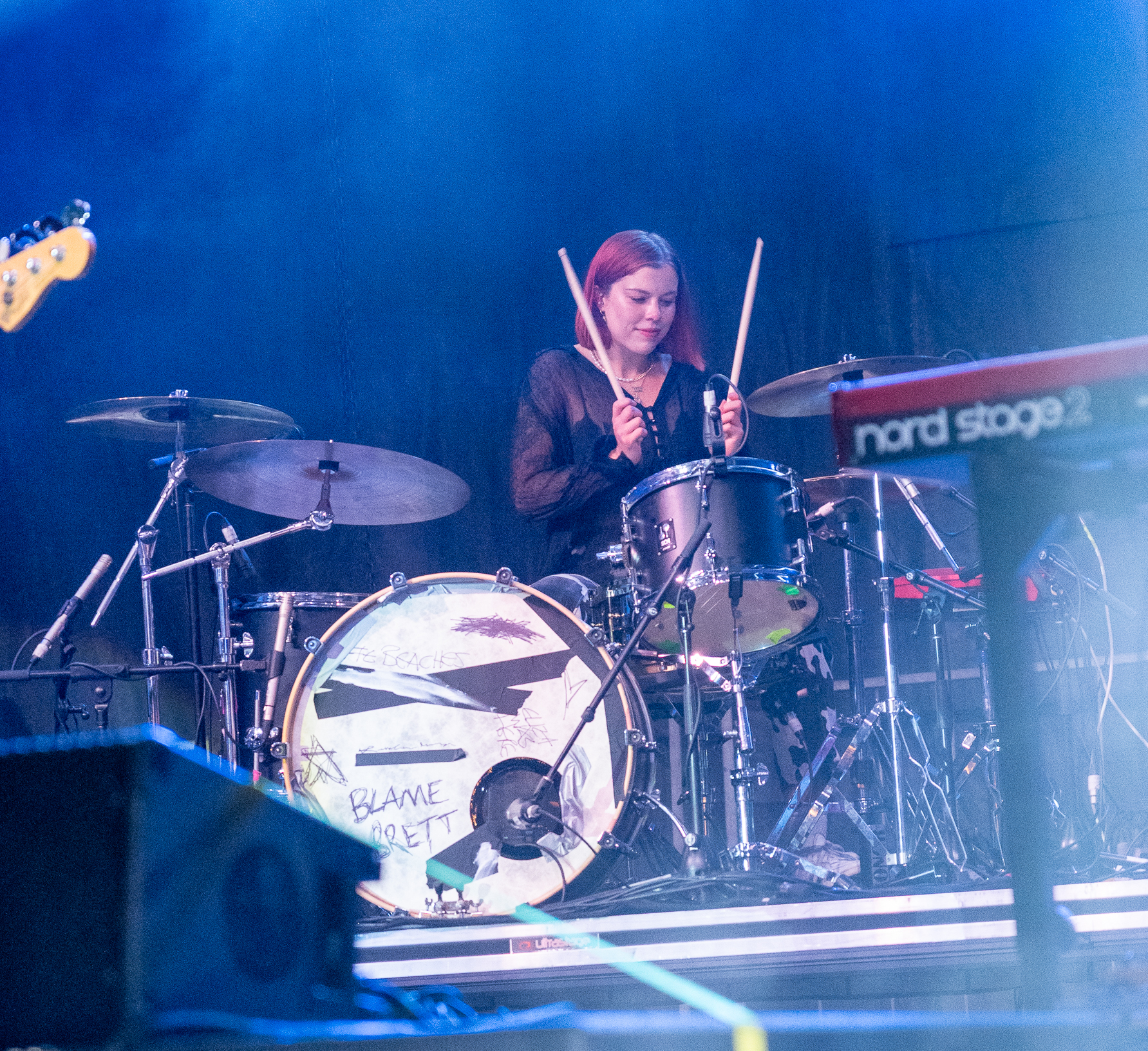
Eliza Enman-McDaniel

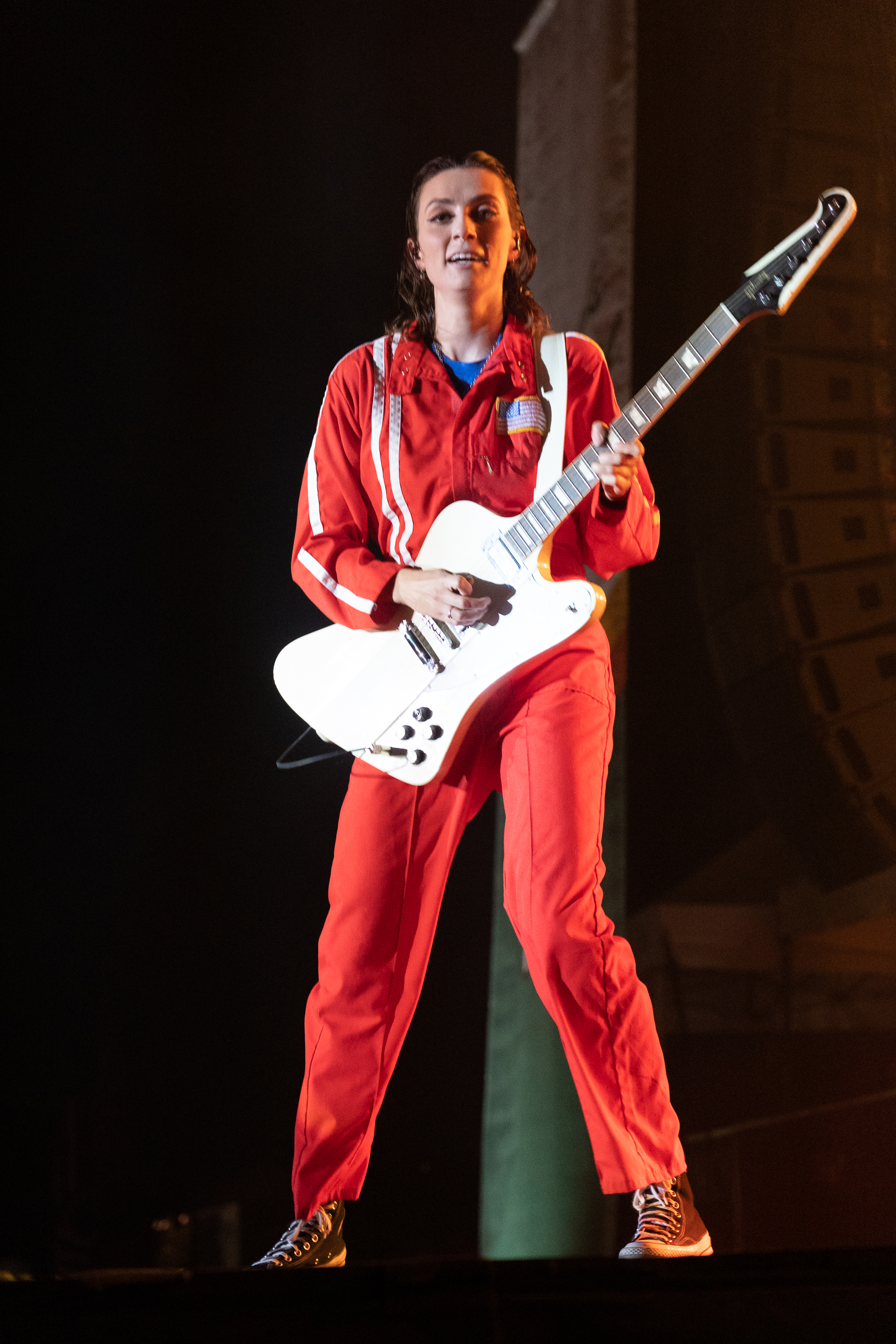
Leandra Earl

Current

- Jordan Miller – lead vocals, bass guitar (2009–present)
- Kylie Miller – guitar, backing vocals (2009–present)
- Eliza Enman-McDaniel – drums, backing vocals (2009–present)
- Leandra Earl – guitar, keyboards, backing vocals, bass guitar (2013–present)

Former

- Megan Fitchett – guitar (2009–2013)

== Discography ==
=== Studio albums ===
List of studio albums, with selected chart positions
Title	Details	Peak chart positions				
Title	Details	CAN	BEL (FL)	UK DL	UK Indie	US Sales
Late Show	Released: October 13, 2017; Label: Island; Formats: CD, streaming, digital download, vinyl	—	—	—	—	—
Blame My Ex	Released: September 15, 2023; Label: self-released; Formats: CD, streaming, digital download, vinyl	76	—	—	—	—
No Hard Feelings	Released: August 29, 2025; Label: AWAL; Formats: CD, streaming, digital download, vinyl	38	95	50	41	48
"—" denotes album that did not chart or was not released.

=== Compilation albums ===
- Sisters Not Twins (The Professional Lovers Album) (2022)

=== EPs ===
- The Beaches (2013)
- Heights (2014)
- The Professional (2019)
- Future Lovers (2021)
- End of Summer (2022)

=== Singles ===
Title	Year	Peak chart positions										Certifications	Album
Title	Year	CAN Air.	CAN HAC	CAN Pop	CAN Rock	AUS	IRE	UK	US Bub.	US Pop	US Rock	Certifications	Album
"Money"	2017	—	—	—	4	—	—	—	—	—	—		Late Show
"T-Shirt"	2018	41	37	—	1	—	—	—	—	—	—	MC: Gold	Late Show
"Fascination"	2018	—	—	—	10	—	—	—	—	—	—		The Professional
"Snake Tongue"	2019	—	—	—	21	—	—	—	—	—	—		The Professional
"Want What You Got"	2019	—	—	—	2	—	—	—	—	—	—		The Professional
"Lame"	2020	—	—	—	4	—	—	—	—	—	—		The Professional
"Let's Go"	2021	—	34	—	4	—	—	—	—	—	—		Future Lovers
"Blow Up"	2021	—	31	—	2	—	—	—	—	—	—		Future Lovers
"Grow Up Tomorrow"	2022	—	32	—	3	—	—	—	—	—	—		End of Summer
"Orpheus"	2022	—	—	—	—	—	—	—	—	—	—		End of Summer
"My People"	2022	—	—	—	—	—	—	—	—	—	—		End of Summer
"Everything Is Boring"	2023	—	—	—	—	—	—	—	—	—	—		Blame My Ex
"Blame Brett"	2023	—	27	32	1	—	—	—	—	33	— (Note: "Blame Brett" did not enter the Hot Rock & Alternative Songs chart, but peaked at number 27 on the Rock & Alternative Airplay chart.)	MC: Platinum; RIAA: Gold	Blame My Ex
"What Doesn't Kill You Makes You Paranoid"	2023	—	—	—	7	—	—	—	—	—	—		Blame My Ex
"Edge of the Earth"	2024	— (Note: "Edge of the Earth" did not enter the Canada All-Format Airplay chart, but peaked at number 19 on the Canada Digital Song Sales chart.)	10	10	21	48	83	88	12	21	25		Blame My Ex
"Takes One to Know One"	2024	—	—	16	3	—	—	—	—	—	—		No Hard Feelings
"Jocelyn"	2024	—	—	—	—	—	—	—	—	—	—		No Hard Feelings
"Last Girls at the Party"	2025	—	40	—	1	—	—	—	—	—	—		No Hard Feelings
"Did I Say Too Much"	2025	—	—	—	—	—	—	—	—	—	—		No Hard Feelings
"Touch Myself"	2025	—	—	—	—	—	—	—	—	—	—		No Hard Feelings
"Lesbian of the Year"	2025	—	—	—	—	—	—	—	—	—	—		No Hard Feelings
"Can I Call You in the Morning?"	2025	—	—	—	11	—	—	—	—	—	— (Note: "Can I Call You in the Morning?" did not enter the Hot Rock & Alternative Songs chart, but peaked at number 36 on the Alternative Airplay chart.)		No Hard Feelings
"I Ran (So Far Away)"	2026	—	37	—	40	—	—	—	—	—	—		Non-album singles
"Lez Go!" (with G Flip)	2026	—	—	—	—	—	—	—	—	—	—		Non-album singles
"Should've Known Better"	2026	—	—	—	18	—	—	—	—	—	—		No Hard Feelings (Deluxe)
"—" denotes a recording that did not chart or was not released in that territory.

=== Music videos ===
Year	Song	Director
2013	"Loner"	Michael Maxxis
2013	"Absolutely Nothing"	—N/a
2014	"Little Pieces"	Doug Gillen
2014	"Strange Love"	Doug Gillen
2016	"Give It Up"	Samuel Gursky
2017	"Late Show"	—N/a
2017	"Money"	Mark Martin
2017	"Gold"	—N/a
2018	"T-Shirt"	James Villeneuve
2018	"Highway 6"	
2018	"Moment"	Ben Roberts
2018	"Fascination"	—N/a
2019	"Snake Tongue"	—N/a
2020	"Lame"	Alex P. Smith
2021	"Blow Up"	Alex P. Smith
2021	"Let's Go"	—N/a
2022	"Grow Up Tomorrow"	Ievy Stamatov
2023	"Blame Brett"	Ievy Stamatov
2023	"What Doesn't Kill You Makes You Paranoid"	Ievy Stamatov
2025	"Last Girls at the Party"	Laura-Lynn Petrick
2025	"Can I Call You in the Morning?"	—N/a
2025	"I Wore You Better"	—N/a
2025	"Fine, Let's Get Married"	—N/a
2025	"Dirty Laundry"	—N/a
2025	"Sorry for Your Loss"	—N/a
2026	"Edge of the Earth"	Lara Chochon

== Awards and nominations ==
Year	Award	Category	Nominee/Work	Result	Ref
2018	iHeartRadio MuchMusic Video Awards	Best New Canadian Artist	The Beaches	Nominated	
2018	Juno Awards	Breakthrough Group of the Year	Late Show	Won	
2018	Canadian Radio Music Awards	Best New Group or Solo Artist:Rock Song	"Money"	Won	
2018	SOCAN Songwriting Prize	English	Leandra Earl, Eliza Enman-McDaniel, Jordan Miller, Kylie Miller, Garrett Lee — "Money"	Nominated	
2022	Juno Awards	Rock Album of the Year	Sisters Not Twins (The Professional Lovers Album)	Won	
2022	Prism Prize		Alex P. Smith — "Blow Up"	Shortlisted	
2023	MTV Europe Music Awards	Best Canadian Act	The Beaches	Nominated	
2023	Indies	Rock Artist/Group or Duo of the Year	The Beaches	Nominated	
2024	Juno Awards	Rock Album of the Year	Blame My Ex	Won	
2024	Juno Awards	Group of the Year	The Beaches	Won	
2024	Indies	Album of the Year	Blame My Ex	Nominated	
2024	Indies	Group or Duo of the Year	The Beaches	Won	
2024	Indies	Rock Artist/Group or Duo of the Year	The Beaches	Won	
2024	Indies	Song of the Year	"Blame Brett"	Won	
2024	Indies	Fan Choice	The Beaches	Nominated	
2025	Juno Awards	Group of the Year	The Beaches	Won	
2026	Juno Awards	Group of the Year	The Beaches	Won	
2026	Juno Awards	Rock Album of the Year	No Hard Feelings	Won	
2026	Polaris Music Prize	Albums	No Hard Feelings	Longlisted	
