= Chris LaRocca =

Canadian rhythm and blues singer-songwriter

Chris LaRocca is a Canadian rhythm and blues singer-songwriter from Woodbridge, Ontario. A songwriting collaborator with artists such as Bryson Tiller, Summer Walker and Kali Uchis, LaRocca released solo singles beginning in 2017, before releasing his full-length debut album i cried my eyes out in 2023.

He has been a two-time SOCAN Songwriting Prize nominee, receiving nods in 2021 as one of the writers of Lu Kala's "No Smoke", and 2023 as one of the writers of Boslen's "Levels".

Matty Green received a Juno Award nomination for Recording Engineer of the Year at the Juno Awards of 2024 for his work on LaRocca's "because of you" and Ellie Goulding's "Midnight Dreams".
