= Buy My Love =

2011 single by Wynter Gordon

Single by Wynter Gordon

from the album With the Music I Die
- Released: August 22, 2011
- Genre: Dance-pop; house
- Length: 3:08
- Label: Big Beat Records
- Songwriters: Axel Hedfors; Diana Gordon; Nicole Morier
- Producer: Axwell

Wynter Gordon singles chronology
"Til Death" (2011)	"Buy My Love" (2011)	"Still Getting Younger" (2012)

"Buy My Love" is a song by American singer-songwriter Wynter Gordon. It is the third single to be released from her debut album, With the Music I Die (2011). It was released in the US and Australia on August 22, 2011, while an EP of remixes was released in the US on September 6, 2011. For the week of November 5, 2011, "Buy My Love" was named the Hot Shot Debut on the Billboard Hot Dance/Club Songs chart, debuting at number 45 and peaking at number two. It was her third single to peak inside the top three on the chart. The song debuted at number 77 on the Australian Singles Chart and peaked at number 72 the following week.

== Music video ==
The music video premiered online on September 8, 2011. It features Gordon in a 1980s setting going on a shopping spree with her friend.

== Track listing ==
Digital download

1. "Buy My Love" – 3:08

Buy My Love (Remixes)

1. "Buy My Love" (Chuckie Remix) – 6:00
2. "Buy My Love" (Crazibiza Remix) – 6:15
3. "Buy My Love" (Fareoh Remix) – 6:00
4. "Buy My Love" (Jealous Much? Remix) – 4:30
5. "Buy My Love" (Jonny Sonic Remix) – 6:11
6. "Buy My Love" (Loud Manners vs. Bass Monkeys Remix) – 5:42
7. "Buy My Love" (Justin Sane & Mikael Wills Remix) – 5:07
8. "Buy My Love" (Tujamo Remix) – 6:55

== Charts ==
=== Weekly charts ===
Chart (2011)	Peak position
Australia (ARIA)	72
Australian Dance (ARIA)	18
US Dance Club Songs (Billboard)	2

=== Year-end charts ===
Chart (2012)	Position
US Dance Club Songs (Billboard)	48

== Release history ==
Region	Date	Format	Label
Australia	August 22, 2011	Digital download	Warner Music
United States	August 22, 2011	Digital download	Big Beat
United Kingdom	June 10, 2012	Digital download	Warner Music
