= Beautiful (Sarah De Bono song) =

Promotional single by Sarah De Bono

from the album No Shame
- Released: 18 June 2012
- Recorded: 2012
- Length: 2:23
- Label: Universal
- Songwriter(s): Sarah De Bono, J Cabrera

"Beautiful" is a song by Australian recording artist Sarah De Bono, released as a promotional single for The Voice (Australia) on 18 June 2012. The song was originally written with Australian hitmaker producer 'Jhay C' which peaked at number four on the ARIA Singles Chart and was certified gold.

== Background ==
According to Bono, she wrote the song at the age of 16 whilst "going through a tough time, and I wanted to write a song about being beautiful on the inside. That’s what really counts, and I just wanted it to be a feel good track that tells people its what is inside, not outside, that counts. I don’t care what you look like, its your heart that really matters, I want to feel your heart."

== Track listing ==
- Digital download
1. "Beautiful" (The Voice Performance) – 2:23

== Charts and certifications ==
Chart (2012)	Peak position
ARIA Singles Chart	4

=== Certifications ===
Country	Certifications
Australia	Gold

== Release history ==
Country	Date	Format	Label
Australia	18 June 2012	Digital download	Universal Music Australia
