= No Shame (Sarah De Bono song) =

Single by Sarah De Bono

from the album No Shame
- Released: 29 June 2012
- Genre: Electropop
- Length: 4:09
- Label: Universal
- Songwriters: Nicole Morier, Magnus Lidehall, Vincent Pontare, Seinabo Sey
- Producers: Eric J Dubowsky, Stuart Crichton

"No Shame" is the debut single by Australian recording artist Sarah De Bono, taken from her debut studio album No Shame. It was released digitally on 29 June 2012, as the album's lead single. The song was written by Nicole Morier, Magnus Lidehall, Vincent Pontare and Seinabo Sey and produced by Stuart Crichton and Eric J Dubowsky. "No Shame" debuted and peaked at number 50 ARIA Singles Chart.

== Background and reception ==
"No Shame" would have been De Bono's winner's single for The Voice (Australia), if she had won the show. De Bono explained the concept of the song, stating "It's about being original, being comfortable in your own skin with no shame!". Cameron Adams of News.com.au wrote that the song sounded like "a one-woman Girls Aloud" and described it as "noisy electropop". "No Shame" debuted on the ARIA Singles Chart at number 50 on 9 July 2012. The following week, the song left the ARIA top 100.

== Track listing ==
- Digital download
1. "No Shame" – 4:09

== Charts ==
Chart (2012)	Peak position
ARIA Singles Chart	50

== Release history ==
Country	Date	Format	Label
Australia	28 June 2012	Radio premiere	Universal Music Australia
Australia	29 June 2012	Digital download	Universal Music Australia
