= Til Death (song) =

Single by Wynter Gordon

Single by Wynter Gordon

from the album With the Music I Die
- Released: April 15, 2011
- Genre: Dance-pop
- Length: 3:05
- Label: Big Beat
- Songwriters: Diana Gordon; Tom Neville; Colleen Fitzpatrick
- Producer: Tom Neville

Wynter Gordon singles chronology
"Believer" (2010)	"Til Death" (2011)	"Buy My Love" (2011)

"Til Death" is a song by American singer-songwriter Wynter Gordon. It is the second single to be released from her debut album, With the Music I Die (2011) and her With the Music I Die EP (2011) exclusively released in the US. The song was remixed by Denzal Park and was released as the official single internationally.

== Music video ==
Two versions of the music video were released, featuring the original version of the track and the Denzal Park remix. The video features Wynter and friends in a dead-style fashion which they become alive when the music is played and party, which after they die again.

== Track listing ==
US digital download

1. "Til Death" – 3:05

Til Death (Remixes)

1. "Til Death" (Dan Castro Remix) – 7:26
2. "Til Death" (R3hab Remix) – 5:22
3. "Til Death" (PolenRockers Remix) – 4:37
4. "Til Death" (PolenRockers Remix Radio Edit) – 3:11
5. "Til Death" (Ken Loi Remix) – 6:32
6. "Til Death" (Denzal Park Radio Edit) – 2:59
7. "Til Death" (WaWa Remix) – 5:11

International digital download

1. "Til Death" (Denzal Park Radio Edit) – 2:59

Australian remixes

1. "Til Death" (Dan Castro Remix) – 7:26
2. "Til Death" (Denzal Park Extended Mix) – 5:01
3. "Til Death" (PolenRockers Remix) – 4:37
4. "Til Death" (WaWa Remix) – 5:11
5. "Til Death" (Oxford Hustlers Club Mix) – 6:28
6. "Til Death" (Andy Murphy & DJ Jorj Mix) – 6:05

== Charts ==
=== Weekly charts ===
Chart (2011)	Peak position
Australia (ARIA)	16
Australian Dance (ARIA)	3
US Dance Club Songs (Billboard)	3
US Dance/Mix Show Airplay (Billboard)	8

=== Year-end charts ===
Chart (2011)	Position
US Dance Club Songs (Billboard)	20

== Certifications ==
Region	Certification	Certified units/sales
Australia (ARIA)	Gold	35,000^{^}
^{^} Shipments figures based on certification alone.

== Release history ==
Region	Date	Format	Label
United States	April 15, 2011	Digital Download	Big Beat
Australia	April 15, 2011	Digital Download	Warner Music
United Kingdom	September 4, 2011	Digital Download	Big Beat
