= Dirty Talk (Wynter Gordon song) =

2010 single by Wynter Gordon

Single by Wynter Gordon

from the album With the Music I Die
- Released: February 17, 2010
- Recorded: 2009
- Genre: Electropop; dance-pop
- Length: 3:16
- Label: Big Beat
- Songwriters: Michael Caren; Gregory Ferguson; Wynter Gordon; Nicole Morier; Norman White
- Producer: Jupiter Ace

Wynter Gordon singles chronology
"Sugar" (2009)	"Dirty Talk" (2010)	"Believer" (2010)

"Dirty Talk" is a song by American recording artist Wynter Gordon, taken from her debut studio album, With the Music I Die. It was released in the United States on February 17, 2010. The song was written by Gordon, Michael Caren, Gregory Ferguson, Nicole Morier, Norman White and produced by Jupiter Ace. "Dirty Talk" is an electropop and dance-pop song backed by a house beat, inspired by a bedroom fantasy. Gordon has stated that the song is a lyrical product of her and her girlfriends goofing around in the studio.

The song was well-received from critics. It was praised for its naughty lyrics and fun production. "Dirty Talk" topped Billboard's Hot Dance Club Songs. Outside of the United States, "Dirty Talk" topped the charts in Australia, peaked within the top ten of the charts in the Republic of Ireland, and the top 30 of the charts in the United Kingdom. In the latter country, "Dirty Talk" also peaked at number six on the UK Dance Chart and remains a popular anthem in Britain's nightclubs. Its accompanying music video was directed by Armen Djerrahian and premiered on July 19, 2010.

== Background ==
"Dirty Talk" was written by Gordon in collaboration with Michael Caren, Gregory Ferguson, Nicole Morier and Norman White. It was written after Gordon "finally found her lane in dance music" after she previously wrote genre varied songs for the likes of Mary J. Blige. "Dirty Talk" acts as Gordon's debut single as a solo artist. She mentioned: "Being featured on 'Sugar' with Flo Rida was great but there's nothing like having your own song."

"Dirty Talk" has been said to be about Gordon singing about bedroom fantasies. The song's lyrics were a product of her and co-writer Nicole Morier goofing around in the studio, trying to think of "sexy things". Speaking to AtlanticRecords.com, Gordon stated the song was not about anyone in particular. She said:

It came about when my friend and I were in the studio just joking, laughing and pulling up words on the computer from different sites. It was meant to be more of a joke than a real song and it just happened to come out great!

According to Morier in an interview with HitQuarters: "We were just being silly but on the other side I thought it had this really great catchy melody, and I love the chorus. I don’t think either of us at the time thought it would end up being her launching single."

== Release ==
Wynter Gordon and her three different appearances in the music video.

"Dirty Talk" premiered and was first made available for digital download internationally on Gordon's official website on February 17, 2010. Remixes of the song by Laidback Luke, Kim Fai and Hagenaar & Albrecht were also confirmed to follow in accompaniment of the single. A day later the song was available to buy on iTunes in the United States. The song then premiered for airplay on New York City radio station WWPR-FM on February 22, 2010. On March 1, a snippet of the Hagenaar & Albrecht remix was leaked. The full Hagenaar & Albrecht remix together with remixes by Laidback Luke, Kim Fai and Ocelot were then made available for download in EP format on March 23, 2010. A second remix EP was then made available in the US featuring remixes by Chew Fu, Electrolightz, Saul Ruiz, Watchmen and Jeremy Word on May 4, 2010. A limited edition nine-track digital remix EP of "Dirty Talk" was purchasable on June 10, 2010.

For the UK release of the song, some of the lyrics were re-recorded due to the songs sexual nature being deemed too rude for daytime listening and viewing. Only this version of the single has been used for radio play and music channels.

== Critical reception ==
DJ Ron Slomowicz of About.com positively reviewed "Dirty Talk" calling it a "straight up club track that is down and dirty." Slomowicz went on to compliment the song's production saying: "The production is fun and bouncy and does a good job of getting you into the groove."

Robert Copsey of Digital Spy UK gave the song 4 out of 5 stars, stating that "Over the last 12 months, countless pop acts – both new and established – have turned their toes towards the dancefloor. That said, few have pulled it off with the finesse and sophistication of a Robin S, Sonique or Ultra Naté, artists whose club classics remain the staple of a good night out donkeys' years on. Cue Wynter Gordon, who, having already teamed up with disco bigwigs David Guetta and Freemasons, is ready to launch herself as a proper dance artiste. "Kitten heels, lingerie / Pantyhose, foreplay," she purrs over club beats bouncier than a space-hopper – and if the never-ending list of ways she gets her fella going isn't especially your thing, the hi-NRG chorus that sounds like a lost '90s classic will likely make up for it. "I'm no angel," she boasts on said chorus, before proceeding to request everything from a blindfold to hot wax to "S&M on the floor", rather prompting the response, 'Oh love we get it, you don't live your life like a nun!'."

== Chart performance ==
Following release during July 2010, the single managed to reach the number-one spot on the Billboard Hot Dance Club Songs on the week ending July 24, 2010; having been preceded by Alexis Jordan and was succeeded by British electro pop group Goldfrapp. "Dirty Talk" also debuted on the ARIA Chart at number 77 on December 6, 2010, where after four weeks cracked the Top 10; by climbing to number 5 on January 10, 2011. A week later, the single rose 4 places to the top spot, where it stayed for 3 weeks before being knocked to number 2 by Rihanna's "S&M". In Ireland, the song debuted at number 30 the week ending April 28 and rose all the way to number 8 the following week. In the United Kingdom, "Dirty Talk" debuted at number thirty four on the UK Singles Chart. In its second week, it climbed to number twenty five, where it peaked and stayed for three weeks. The song remained inside the Top forty of the UK Singles Chart for twelve weeks. The song peaked at number six on the UK Dance Chart. "Dirty Talk" was certified gold by the British Phonographic Industry.

== Music video ==
There have been two music videos released for the song. The first directed by Armen Djerrahian, was premiered on July 19, 2010, and has a magical fairytale theme to it.

The second and official video premiered on YouTube on November 16, 2010. It shows Gordon in various costumes, make-up & wigs. And, many 'magical-like' effects and edits were done. In her first appearance, she dons two short pig tails, in her next appearance, she wore a long, black-haired wig with reddish-purple bangs wearing a red, blue & purple coloured dress. In her next scene, she wears the same long-haired wig, but, with yellow bangs instead, and yellow dress. The video flashes to her first and third appearance with her dancing. During her third chorus, the video changes back to her second appearance. In the bridge, Gordon is seen naked with short, uncut hair. And, the video ends with her second appearance. The video has received over 11 million views on Gordon's official YouTube channel.

For unknown reasons, the music video was no longer available on Gordon's YouTube channel, but a reuploaded version by TVNeon was also released on November 16, 2010, and as of 2023, it has over 13 million views.

== Track listings ==
- Digital single
1. "Dirty Talk" – 3:16
- Dirty Talk Remixes EP (1)
1. "Dirty Talk" (Laidback Luke Remix) – 6:31
2. "Dirty Talk" (Kim Fai Remix) – 6:30
3. "Dirty Talk" (Hagenaar & Albrecht Remix) – 5:56
4. "Dirty Talk" (Ocelot Mix) – 7:37
- Dirty Talk Remixes EP (2)
1. "Dirty Talk" (Chew Fu Remix) – 5:26
2. "Dirty Talk" (Electrolightz Remix) – 3:25
3. "Dirty Talk" (Saul Ruiz Remix) – 8:47
4. "Dirty Talk" (Watchmen Remix) – 5:14
5. "Dirty Talk" (Jeremy Word Remix) – 6:16
- Dirty Talk EP
1. "Dirty Talk" – 3:16
2. "Dirty Talk" (Laidback Luke Remix) – 6:31
3. "Dirty Talk" (Chew Fu Remix) – 5:26
4. "Dirty Talk" (Saul Ruiz Remix) – 8:47
5. "Dirty Talk" (Electrolightz Remix) – 3:25
6. "Dirty Talk" (Jeremy Word Remix) – 6:16
7. "Dirty Talk" (Watchmen Remix) – 5:14
8. "Dirty Talk" (Hagenaar & Albrecht Remix) – 5:56
9. "Dirty Talk" (Kim Fai Remix) – 6:30

== Charts and certifications ==
=== Weekly charts ===
Chart (2010–2011)	Peak position
Australia (ARIA)	1
Belgium (Ultratip Bubbling Under Flanders)	13
Belgium (Ultratip Bubbling Under Wallonia)	3
Denmark (Tracklisten)	33
France (SNEP)	50
Ireland (IRMA)	8
Scottish Singles Sales (Official Charts)	18
UK Singles (Official Charts)	25
UK Dance (Official Charts)	6
US Hot Dance Club Songs (Billboard)	1

=== Year-end charts ===
Chart (2011)	Position
Australia (ARIA)	19
UK Singles (OCC)	116

=== Certifications ===
Region	Certification	Certified units/sales
Australia (ARIA)	3× Platinum	210,000^{^}
United Kingdom (BPI)	Platinum	600,000^{‡}
^{^} Shipments figures based on certification alone.^{‡} Sales+streaming figures based on certification alone.

== Release history ==
Region	Date	Format	Label
United States	February 17, 2010	Digital download (Wyntergordon.com)	Big Beat
United States	February 18, 2010	Digital download (iTunes)	Big Beat
United States	March 23, 2010	Digital remix EP – Part 1	Big Beat
United States	May 4, 2010	Digital remix EP – Part 2	Big Beat
United States	June 10, 2010	CD single	Big Beat
Australia	November 19, 2010	Digital download	Warner Music
Australia	December 17, 2010	Digital remixes	Warner Music
United Kingdom	April 24, 2011	Digital download	Big Beat Records

== See also ==
- List of number-one dance singles of 2010 (U.S.)
