= With the Music I Die =

Studio album by Wynter Gordon
- Released: June 17, 2011
- Recorded: 2009–2011
- Genre: Electropop; dance-pop; house
- Length: 33:46
- Label: Big Beat; Atlantic
- Producer: Tom Neville; Jupiter Ace; Oak; Axwell; Pnau; Djibril Kagni; Jordan Houyez; GhostTrack; D'Mile; Robbie Rivera; Mysto & Pizzi; Famties; Static Revenger

Wynter Gordon chronology
The First Dance (2010)	With the Music I Die (2011)	Human Condition: Doleo (2012)

Singles from With the Music I Die
- 1. "Dirty Talk" Released: February 17, 2010; 2. "Til Death" Released: April 15, 2011; 3. "Buy My Love" Released: August 22, 2011; 4. "Still Getting Younger" Released: June 1, 2012

With the Music I Die is the debut album and second extended play by American singer-songwriter Wynter Gordon, who subsequently adopted the stage name Diana Gordon. The full album was released through Big Beat Records exclusively in Australia on June 17, 2011. A cut-down EP version of the album was released in the United States and United Kingdom. It was preceded by the release of three singles: "Dirty Talk", "Til Death", and "Buy My Love", which all peaked inside the top three of the Hot Dance Club Songs Chart.

== Singles ==
"Dirty Talk" was released as the lead single from the album and was well-received from critics, who praised it for its creative lyrics and fun production. It topped the US Hot Dance Club Songs chart and Australian singles chart. It became a top 20 hit in Belgium, Scotland and Ireland, and a top 40 hit in Denmark. The song peaked at number 25 in the UK, while reaching number six on the UK dance chart. It also charted in France and Romania. The album's second single was "Til Death". The song was remixed by Denzal Park and was released as the official single across Europe and Australia. It debuted at number 24 in Australia, and peaked at number 16. It peaked at number three on the US Hot Dance Club Songs Chart.

The album's third single was "Buy My Love" and a music video for the song was released online on September 8, 2011. The song debuted on the US Hot Dance Club Songs Chart at number 45 and peaked at number two, becoming the third consecutive single from the project to chart in the top 5. "Still Getting Younger" was released on June 1, 2012, as the fourth and final single from the album. The music video for the song was released online on June 11, 2012. It peaked at number 24 on the US Hot Dance Club Songs Chart.

== Track listing ==
Studio album release
No.	Title	Writer(s)	Producer(s)	Length
1.	"Til Death" (Denzal Park Radio Edit)	Diana Gordon; Tom Neville; Colleen Fitzpatrick	Neville; Park	2:59
2.	"Dirty Talk"	Gordon; Michael Caren; Nicole Morier; Gregory Ferguson; Norman White	Jupiter Ace	3:17
3.	"Don't Stop Me"	Gordon; Warren Felder	Oak	3:37
4.	"Buy My Love"	Gordon; Axwell; Morier	Axwell	3:09
5.	"Still Getting Younger"	Gordon; Nick Littlemore; Peter Mayes	Pnau	3:44
6.	"Drunk on Your Love"	Fredrik Rogberg; Miriam Nervo; Olivia Nervo; Saska Becker	Neville	3:26
7.	"All My Life"	James 'JHart' Abrahart; Gordon	Djibril Kagni; Jordan Houyez	3:36
8.	"Rumba" (featuring Kevin McCall)	Gordon; Kevin McCall; Andreas Klingberg; Kristjan Dogar	GhostTrack; Ace of Bass	2:53
9.	"Back to You"	Gordon; Dernst Emile II	D'Mile	3:01
10.	"In the Morning" (featuring Robbie Rivera)	Gordon; Robbie Rivera	Rivera	4:04
Total length:				33:46

Australian iTunes Store bonus tracks
No.	Title	Writer(s)	Producer(s)	Length
11.	"Right Here" (Famties Remix)	Gordon; Makeba Riddick; Mysto & Pizzi	Mysto & Pizzi; Famties	3:36
12.	"Renegade" (featuring Static Revenger)	Gordon; Dennis White	Static Revenger	4:18
Total length:				41:40

- Track listing unveiled by Gordon's official website.

EP release
No.	Title	Writer(s)	Producer(s)	Length
1.	"Til Death"	Diana Gordon; Tom Neville; Colleen Fitzpatrick	Neville	3:05
2.	"Buy My Love"	Gordon; Axwell; Nicole Morier	Axwell	3:08
3.	"Don't Stop Me"	Gordon; Warren Felder	Oak	3:36
4.	"Still Getting Younger"	Gordon; Nick Littlemore; Peter Mayes	Pnau	3:43
5.	"Til Death" (Rock-It Scientists Remix) (featuring Ricky Blaze)			3:20
6.	"Buy My Love" (Extended Mix)			4:33
Total length:				21:25

== Charts ==
Chart (2011)	Peak position
Australian Albums (ARIA)	25
Australian Dance Albums (ARIA)	4

== Release history ==
Region	Date	Format	Label
Australia	June 17, 2011	Digital download, CD	Warner Music
United States	June 28, 2011	Digital download	Big Beat, Atlantic
United Kingdom	December 9, 2011	Digital download	Big Beat, Atlantic
