= Diana Gordon =

American singer-songwriter (born 1985)

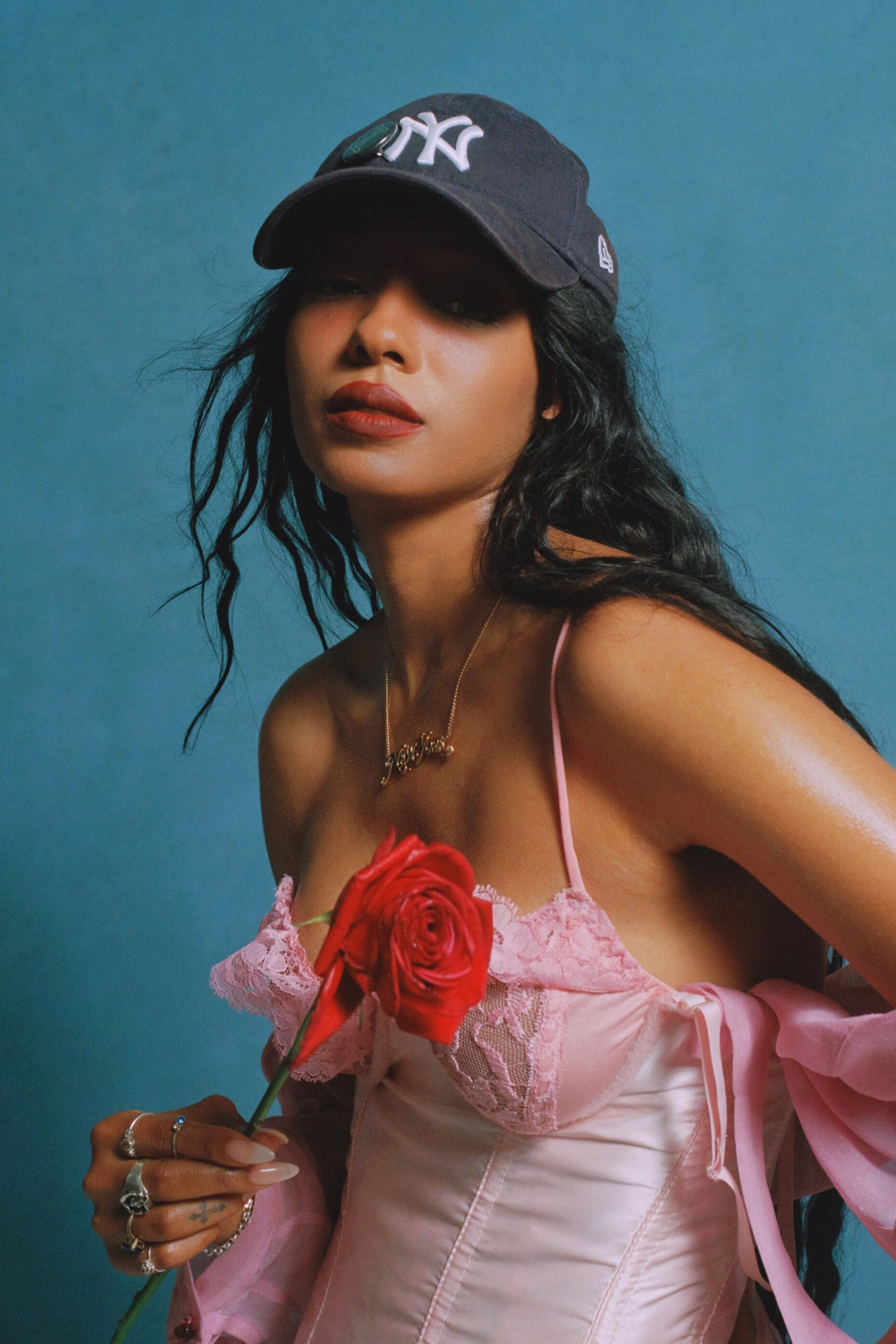
- Gordon in 2019

Background information
- Born: August 25, 1985 (age 41); Queens, New York City, U.S.
- Genres: R&B; dance-pop; house
- Occupations: Singer, songwriter
- Years active: 2004–present
- Labels: 4AD; Atlantic; Facet

Diana Gordon (born August 25, 1985), formerly known as Wynter Gordon, is an American singer and songwriter. She began her career writing music for other artists, later signing with Atlantic Records where she started to work on her own album. Her debut album With the Music I Die was released in 2011, with its lead single "Dirty Talk" receiving triple platinum and platinum certifications in Australia and the United Kingdom respectively, and topping the ARIA Singles Chart in the former country. She began going by her birth name in 2016, and released the extended plays Pure (2018) and Wasted Youth (2020).

Gordon has co-written and performed backing vocals on many popular songs including "Sorry" by Beyoncé, "Electricity" by Silk City and Dua Lipa, and "Bad Habit" by Steve Lacy. Most recently, she provided vocals for several tracks on Lil Yachty's psychedelic rock album Let's Start Here (2023).

== Early life ==
Diana Gordon was born on August 25, 1985, in Queens, New York City, and was brought up in South Jamaica, where she was the middle child of six siblings.

Gordon began singing at a young age. She and her siblings would perform together in church. It was during high school that Gordon decided that she was going to pursue a music career. She was later accepted to the Fiorello H. LaGuardia High School of Music & Art and Performing Arts and interned at a record company. Gordon wrote her first complete song, "Daddy's Song", at the age of 15. She has described song writing as an "escape from poverty"

== Career ==
=== 2004–2010: Career beginnings ===
Gordon worked closely with the producer D'Mile since 2004; her first track to fame, "Gonna Breakthrough", written by Gordon and produced by D'Mile, was used as the title track to Mary J. Blige's 2005 album The Breakthrough. Soon after, Wynter was given an opportunity to sign with Atlantic Records, through Don Pooh Music Group, where she began work on her debut album in 2004.

In 2008, Gordon wrote two tracks for Danity Kane's second album Welcome to the Dollhouse, "2 of You" and "Do Me Good". She co-wrote the single "Sugar", a track that she was featured on with rapper Flo Rida on his album R.O.O.T.S. (2009) after laying down a reference vocal. The track became an international hit and peaked at number five on the US Billboard Hot 100. Gordon also co-wrote and sang on the dance track "Toyfriend" from French DJ David Guetta's album One Love (2009). She worked closely with Jennifer Lopez, writing four tracks including "What Is Love", "What Is Love Part II", "Starting Over" and "Everybody's Girl" for her seventh studio album Love? (2011).

=== 2011–2013: With the Music I Die and Human Condition EPs ===
Gordon released her debut album, With the Music I Die, on June 17, 2011. The lead single from the album, "Dirty Talk", topped the US Hot Dance Club Songs. "Dirty Talk" also topped the charts in Australia, where it was certified 3× Platinum. The song was released in the UK and Ireland on February 18, 2011, where it peaked at No. 25 in the UK and No. 8 in Ireland. The song spent a total of eleven weeks inside the UK Top 40. The second single, "Til Death", peaked at No. 3 on the US Hot Dance Club Songs chart, and No. 16 on the ARIA Singles Chart. The album later produced a further two singles, "Buy My Love" and "Still Getting Younger". In August 2011, Wynter began a two-month stint as the supporting act for Patrick Stump's second US tour.

On June 20, 2012, she premiered a new song, "Stimela", the first promotional single from her collection of Human Condition extended plays, which she decided to self-release to avoid label control. The first EP, Human Condition: Doleo, was released on July 9, 2012. The second EP, Human Condition: Sanguine, was released on January 15, 2013.

=== 2011–2015: The Righteous Young and Five Needle EP ===
In early 2014, Gordon formed a quintet called The Righteous Young, of which she is the lead singer. However, she clarified in a Q&A on Facebook that The Righteous Young does not mean the end of Wynter Gordon as a solo act, but is rather an extension of her own music. "The Righteous Young is my band ... My music, WYNTER and THE RIGHTEOUS YOUNG". She released her first single with The Righteous Young, "Everything Burns", on June 3, 2014. The music video, directed by Harrison Boyce, was exclusively released on Idolator and Vevo on the same day. Wynter embarked on a tour with the band in July 2014, and they were revealed to have been working on their first album alongside producer Mike Elizondo, however, no further music ever eventuated. On July 29, a new solo Wynter track, "The Hard Way", was released on Kitty Cash's "Love the Free Vol. II" mixtape. The song was later released as a promotional single from the mixtape, with a music video being released on April 23, 2015. On May 5, 2015, Wynter released "Bleeding Out", the lead single from her Five Needle EP. The EP itself was later released on June 2, 2015.

=== 2016: Co-writing and producing with Beyoncé ===
On April 23, 2016, Beyoncé released her sixth album Lemonade featuring several tracks where Diana Gordon (credited with her real name, and not her stage name) received a writing and producing credit, including "Don't Hurt Yourself" (which also samples Led Zeppelin's "When the Levee Breaks"), "Sorry", and "Daddy Lessons". A few months after the release of Lemonade, on July 22, 2016, Gordon announced that she was no longer using her stage name Wynter Gordon. Instead, she decided to be going by her birth name, Diana Gordon. On July 25, 2016, Diana Gordon shared her first single under her own name, "The Legend Of". Her first EP released under her own name and titled, Pure, was released on August 3, 2018. In a capsule review for Vice, Robert Christgau gave the EP a three-star honorable mention and summed it up as "five proofs of a Beyoncé cowriter's hard-won, unembittered self-reliance—too modest to be 'inspirational,' and stronger for it"; the tracks "Wolverine" and "Too Young" were cited as highlights. On April 3, 2020, Gordon released a new eight track EP called Wasted Youth featuring acoustic versions of "Rollin" and "Once A Friend."

== Discography ==
- With the Music I Die (2011)

== Awards and nominations ==
Year	Type	Award	Result
2011	International Dance Music Awards	Best Break-Through Artist (Solo) (Wynter Gordon)	Nominated
2011	International Dance Music Awards	Best Pop Dance Track ("Dirty Talk")	Nominated
2011	NewNowNext Awards	Brink of Fame: Music Artist (Wynter Gordon)	Nominated
2016	Grammy Awards	Album of the Year (Producer: Beyonce – Lemonade)	Nominated
2023	Grammy Awards	Song of the Year (Songwriter: Steve Lacy – "Bad Habit")	Nominated
