= Fatai =

- Gender: Male
- Language: Hausa/Yoruba

Origin
- Origin: Nigeria
- Meaning: Loyal and faithful slave/servant of Allah + Fatai/Fattah - conqueror, victor
- Region of origin: Northern region and South-West, Nigeria

Fatai audio is a Nigerian masculine given name and surname, predominantly used among Muslims, particularly within the Hausa and Yoruba communities. Derived from Arabic, "Abdulfatai" signifies Abdul/Abdullah - "loyal and faithful slave/servant of Allah" + Fatai/Fattah - "conqueror, victor".

== Notable Individuals with the Name ==
What do you know about Fatai Gafaru

== Given name ==
- Fatai Akinade Akinbade (born 1955), Nigerian politician
- Alao Fatai Adisa (born 1986), Nigerian footballer
- Fatai Atere (born 1971), Nigerian footballer
- Fatai Ayinla (1939–2016), Nigerian boxer
- Oba Fatai Ayinla Aileru (born 1938), Nigerian politician
- Fatai Rolling Dollar (Olayiwola Fatai Olagunju; 1927–2013), Nigerian singer and songwriter
- Fatai Onikeke (born 1983), Nigerian–Australian boxer
- Fatai Osho, Nigerian football manager
- Otunba Fatai Sowemimo (born 1955), Nigerian businessman and politician
- Fatai (singer) (Fatai Veamatahau; born 1995), Australian singer
- Atanda Fatai Williams (1918–2002), Nigerian jurist
- Zhu Fatai, 4th-century Chinese scholar

== Surname ==
- Adeyemo Fatai, Nigerian table tennis player
- Kehinde Fatai (born 1990), Nigerian footballer
- Sodiq Fatai (born 1996), Nigerian footballer
