= Ojuwoye, Mushin =

Coordinates: 6°32′N 3°21′E

Mushin is a suburb of Lagos, located in Lagos State, Nigeria, and is one of Nigeria's 774 Local Government Areas. It is located 10 km north of the Lagos city centre, adjacent to the main road to Ikeja, and is largely a congested residential area with low-quality housing. According to the 2006 census it had 633,009 inhabitants. The centre of Mushin is located around Ojuwoye Town.

The word "Mushin" in the western part of Nigeria, originates from the picking of 'Ishin fruit' which is a portmanteau of two words: "mu", meaning "pick" and "Ishin", which is a fruit. The Great King of Mushin is Oba Fatai Ayinla Aileru II (JP), Permanent Member of the Council of Obas in Lagos State.
