= Michael Stangel =

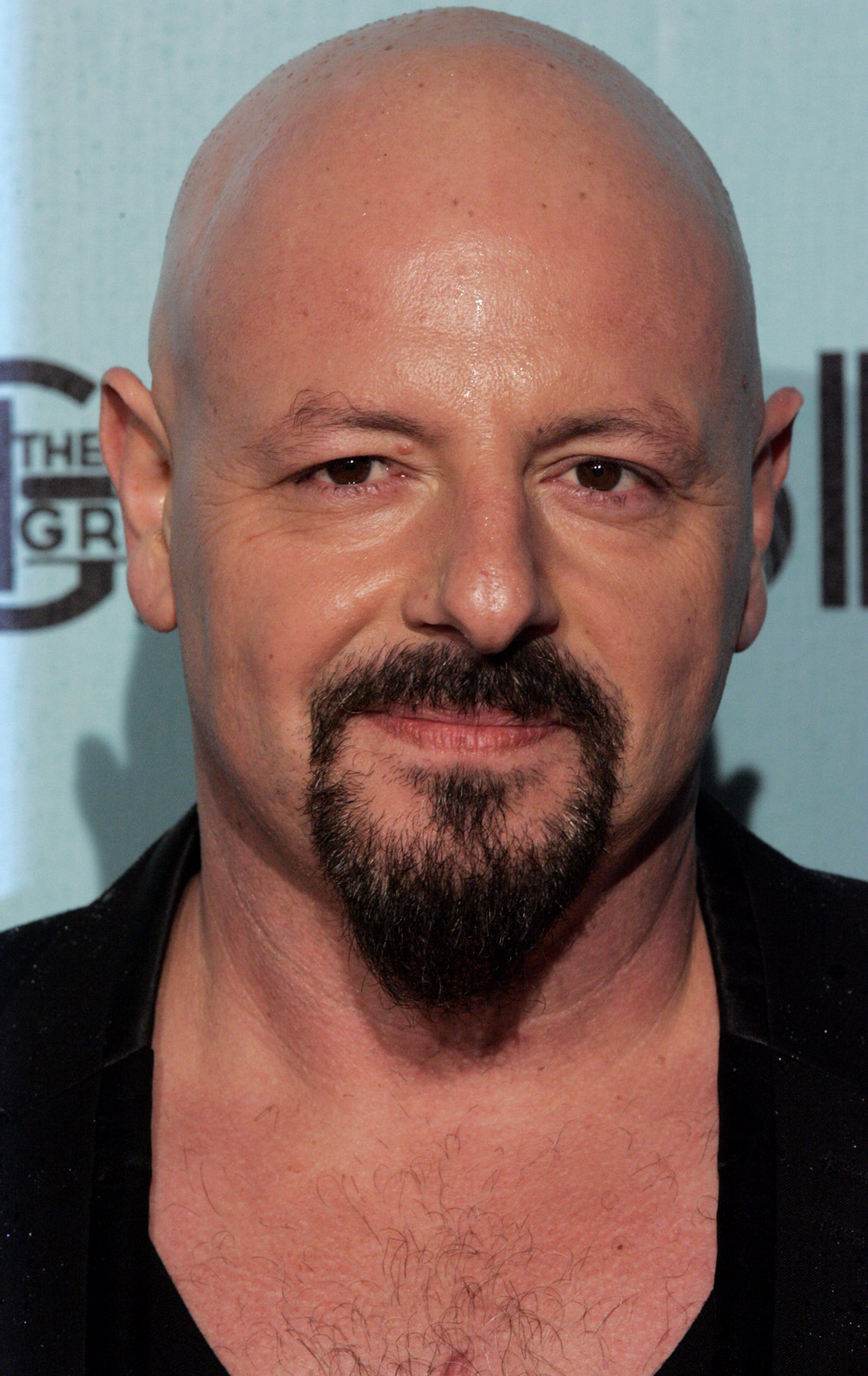
- Stangel at The Great Gatsby Premiere, Sydney, Australia, on 23 May 2013

Background information
- Born: 14 August 1967 (age 59); Geelong, Australia
- Genres: Folk, Rock, Pop, Blues
- Occupations: Record producer, singer-songwriter
- Instrument: Drums/bass/guitar/keyboard/vocals
- Years active: 2002–present
- Label: Jellyfish / Medici

Michael Stangel (born 14 August 1967) is an Australian record producer, singer, songwriter, and a finalist in the second series of The Voice Australia in 2013.

In 2017 Michael began his own management company and has represented Nathaniel Willemse, Taylor Henderson, Justice Crew, and Merril Bainbridge.

== Discography ==
=== Charting singles ===
Title	Year	Peak chart positions
Title	Year	AUS
"Home"	2013	41
