= The Voice (Australian TV series) =

Reality TV series (2012–present)

- Genre: Reality television
- Created by: John de Mol Jr.
- Directed by: Peter Ots
- Presented by: Darren McMullen; Sonia Kruger; Renee Bargh
- Judges: Delta Goodrem; Joel Madden; Seal; Keith Urban; Ricky Martin; Kylie Minogue; will.i.am; Jessie J; Benji Madden; Ronan Keating; Kelly Rowland; Boy George; Joe Jonas; Guy Sebastian; Rita Ora; Jessica Mauboy; Jason Derulo; Adam Lambert; LeAnn Rimes; Kate Miller-Heidke; Melanie C; Richard Marx; Tones and I
- Country of origin: Australia
- Original language: English
- No. of seasons: 15
- No. of episodes: 269

Production
- Executive producers: John de Mol Jr.; Julie Ward; Leigh Aramberri; Jaala Webster; Chloe Baker; Joel McCormack
- Production location: Disney Studios Australia
- Running time: 60–90 minutes (blind auditions); 125 minutes (live shows)
- Production companies: Shine Australia (2012–2016); Talpa Media Group (2012–2019); ITV Studios Australia (2017–present)

Original release
- Network: Nine Network (2012–2020); Seven Network (2021–2026)
- Release: 15 April 2012 – 27 September 2026

Related
- The Voice (franchise); The Voice Generations

The Voice is an Australian singing competition television series. It premiered on the Nine Network on 14 April 2012, before moving to the Seven Network in 2021. Based on the original Dutch singing competition The Voice of Holland, and part of The Voice franchise, its first nine seasons aired on the Nine Network, with its tenth season commencing on the Seven Network on 8 August 2021.

The show aims to find currently unsigned singing talent (solo or duets, professional and amateur) contested by aspiring singers aged 12 or older, drawn from public auditions. The winners receive a recording contract with Universal Music Australia or EMI Music Australia, as well as A$100,000 and other prizes. Winners of the fifteen seasons have been: Karise Eden, Harrison Craig, Anja Nissen, Ellie Drennan, Alfie Arcuri, Judah Kelly, Sam Perry, Diana Rouvas, Chris Sebastian, Bella Taylor Smith, Lachie Gill, Tarryn Stokes, Reuben De Melo, Alyssa Delpopolo, and Yung Milla.

The series employs a panel of coaches who critique the artists' performances and guide their teams of selected artists through the remainder of the season. They also compete to ensure that their act wins the competition, thus making them the winning coach. The original panel featured Delta Goodrem, Joel Madden, Seal and Keith Urban; the panel for the most recent fifteenth season featured Kate Miller-Heidke, Ronan Keating, Richard Marx, Melanie C, and Tones and I. Other judges from previous seasons include Ricky Martin, Kylie Minogue, will.i.am, Benji Madden, Jessie J, Joe Jonas, Guy Sebastian, Kelly Rowland, Boy George, Rita Ora, Jessica Mauboy, Jason Derulo, LeAnn Rimes, and Adam Lambert.

== Format ==
The show is part of the television franchise The Voice and is structured as three phases: blind auditions, battle rounds and live performance shows. In 2017, the show added another phase: the knockouts between the blind auditions and the battles. The winner receives a recording contract with Universal Music or EMI (2019) as well as A$100,000 and other prizes.

=== Blind auditions ===
Four (five in the fifteenth season) judges/coaches, all noteworthy recording artists, choose teams of contestants through a blind audition process during the auditioner's performance. If two or more judges want the same singer (as happens frequently), the singer has the final choice of coach. Each coach must recruit a number of artists (12 in seasons 1, 4-9, 11-12; 14 in seasons 2 and 3) to their team in the blind auditions to move on to the next phase of the competition. In season 10, coaches can complete their teams without a specific number of members.

A new element was introduced in season 9: the Block. Aside from the main button, each coach has three other buttons with the names of their fellow coaches. When a coach wants to get the specific contestant but does not want another coach to do so, they may press the block button to block them from getting the contestant. The coach who wants to use the block and the coach who is being blocked have to turn before any block can be used. They have two blocks to use in the entire phase of the blind auditions and 2 coaches can be blocked in a single audition. In season 11, a coach can block another coach at any time, even during their pitch. In season 12, coaches are allowed to block before a coach turns their chair.

Also, in Season 11, a Battle Pass was introduced, where in each coach can send one artist immediately in the battle rounds by pressing their silver button. This can be used only once in the entire blind auditions. This is axed in the next season.

=== Knockout and battle rounds ===
Each team of singers are mentored and developed by their coach. In the second stage, called the battles, two members from the same team battle it out and perform a duet together. After the battle round, coaches must choose only one to advance. In season 2, a new element was featured in the battle rounds: The Save. Each coach can save one losing artist to join them to their team and reinstating them in the competition. Starting from season 3, the coaches can save two artists instead of one.

Next in the battle rounds was the showdown rounds (which was also introduced in Season 2). In the showdown rounds, each team is grouped into two groups of four artists and will perform a song. One will be saved by the public, the lowest-voter will be immediately eliminated, and the remaining two will be sent to the sing-off. In the sing-off, the artists will sing a reprise of their blind audition and the coaches can only select one artist to advance to the finals. This was slightly changed in season 3, wherein three groups of three artists will perform a song. From each group, one will be saved by the public, the lowest-voter will be immediately eliminated, and the remaining artist will be sent into the sing-off. Those artists that are sent to the sing-off will have to perform a reprise of their blind audition and coaches can only advance one of them to the finals.

In season 4, the showdown round was replaced by the Super Battles. Each coach chooses two of their artists to go straight to the live shows via a Fast Pass. The remaining six artists from each team will be grouped in two groups of three artists. Each artist will sing a different song and coaches can only select one artist to the Live shows. This was slightly changed in season 5, where in each coach must group their team into two groups of four artists each. Those four artists sing an individual song following a theme picked by their coaches. Only two from each group will be able to advance to the live shows.

Starting in season 6, the battles and the knockout rounds were swapped. In the knockouts, coaches pick three of their acts to go against each other in a sing off, with a theme. They all have different songs, after which the coach chooses which act will advance into the next phase, the battles. Once the coach has made a choice, the other coaches have an opportunity to steal two losing artists that were rejected by their coach. Starting in season 8, the coaches can save their own artists. After the knockout rounds is the battle rounds, where artists perform a duet together. Coaches must choose only one to advance, while the other one will be eliminated. Starting from season 7, coaches can select one losing artist in the battles to be a wildcard and might advance to the live shows. However, only one from the four wildcards will advance to the Top 13. In season 8, the coaches’ wildcards are immediately advanced to the final.

In season 9, the battle rounds happened after the blind auditions. The same rules were applied in the earlier seasons, with two saves available, and the coaches can save their own artists as well. After the battle rounds comes the playoffs, where each coach pairs two of their artists together, with each artist singing an individual song following a theme. After all their team's playoffs were done, the coaches chose one of their losing artists as a wildcard and moves on to the Showdowns. In the Showdowns, all artists in their teams will performs and coaches can only takes 2 of them through to the semi-finals.

In season 10, there were no battle rounds and only the knockout rounds were implemented. In that season's knockouts, each artist must perform to their coach. After each act performs, the coaches have three options: to either send the artist straight to the semi-final, send the artist home, or decide at the end of the show when all artists have performed. Each coach can only take two artists through to the semi-final.

In season 11, a new round was introduced, the Callbacks. Coaches will reduce their teams from twelve artists to six, consisting of five artists and one Battles Pass artist. Some artists will be required to perform their blind audition songs, while others will perform during the sing-offs (with coaches choosing a theme, similar to the knockout round in seasons 6 to 8), or they may need to do both. Coaches have the flexibility to advance one, two, or all of their artists in the group, as long as they save at least five of them. Next come the battles, where coaches will pair six artists, comprising five from the Callbacks and one Battles Pass artist. The same rules in the battles applied, with only one from each pair to advance, however, there are no saves available. The artists who win their battles will progress to the Singoffs. Following the battles, coaches will choose one artist from the winning battle artists to advance directly to the semi-finals, while the remaining artists will need to perform another song, with only one of them advancing.

The Callbacks were slightly changed in season 12. Coaches are required to organize their artists into four groups, with each group consisting of three artists. The coaches gave a theme for each of the groups (similar to the singoffs in season 11). In each group, one will go straight to the battles, one will be eliminated, and one will be going to the Ultimate Callbacks for a final cut decision before the battles (a format similar to the showdowns in season 3). During the Ultimate Callbacks, coaches create two groups, each comprising two artists who didn't advance from the callbacks or get eliminated. In a make-or-break sing off, one artist from each group will advance to the battles, while the other will be eliminated. The same battle and sing-off rules last season were applied this season.

In season 13, there were no more Callback rounds.

=== The Cut ===
In season 10, this new phase was introduced and consisted of coaches cutting their teams to just five artists. This phase replaced the "battles" phase typical of past seasons. In this stage of the competition, the coaches divide their teams in groups of a specific theme and the contestants battle it out singing the same song. Each coach can only take five artists through to the Knockouts.

=== Finals and live shows ===
In the final phase, the remaining contestants (Final 8) compete against each other. The audience and coaches have equal say in deciding who moves to the Final 4 phase. With one team member remaining for each coach, the (Final 4) contestants compete in the finale with the outcome decided by public vote.

== Production ==
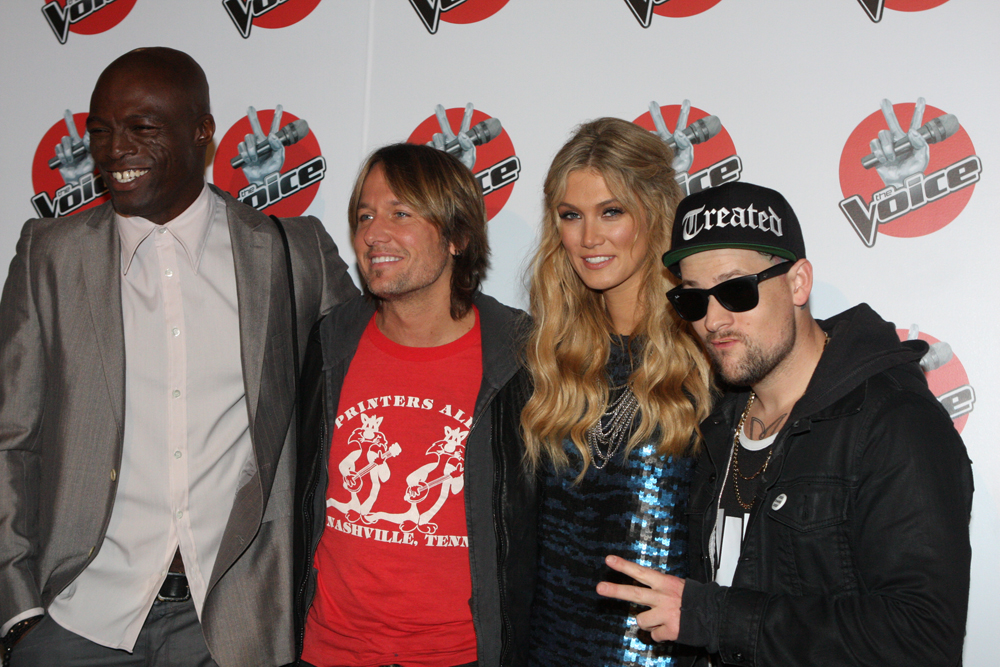
Coaches (series 1): Seal, Keith Urban, Delta Goodrem, and Joel Madden.

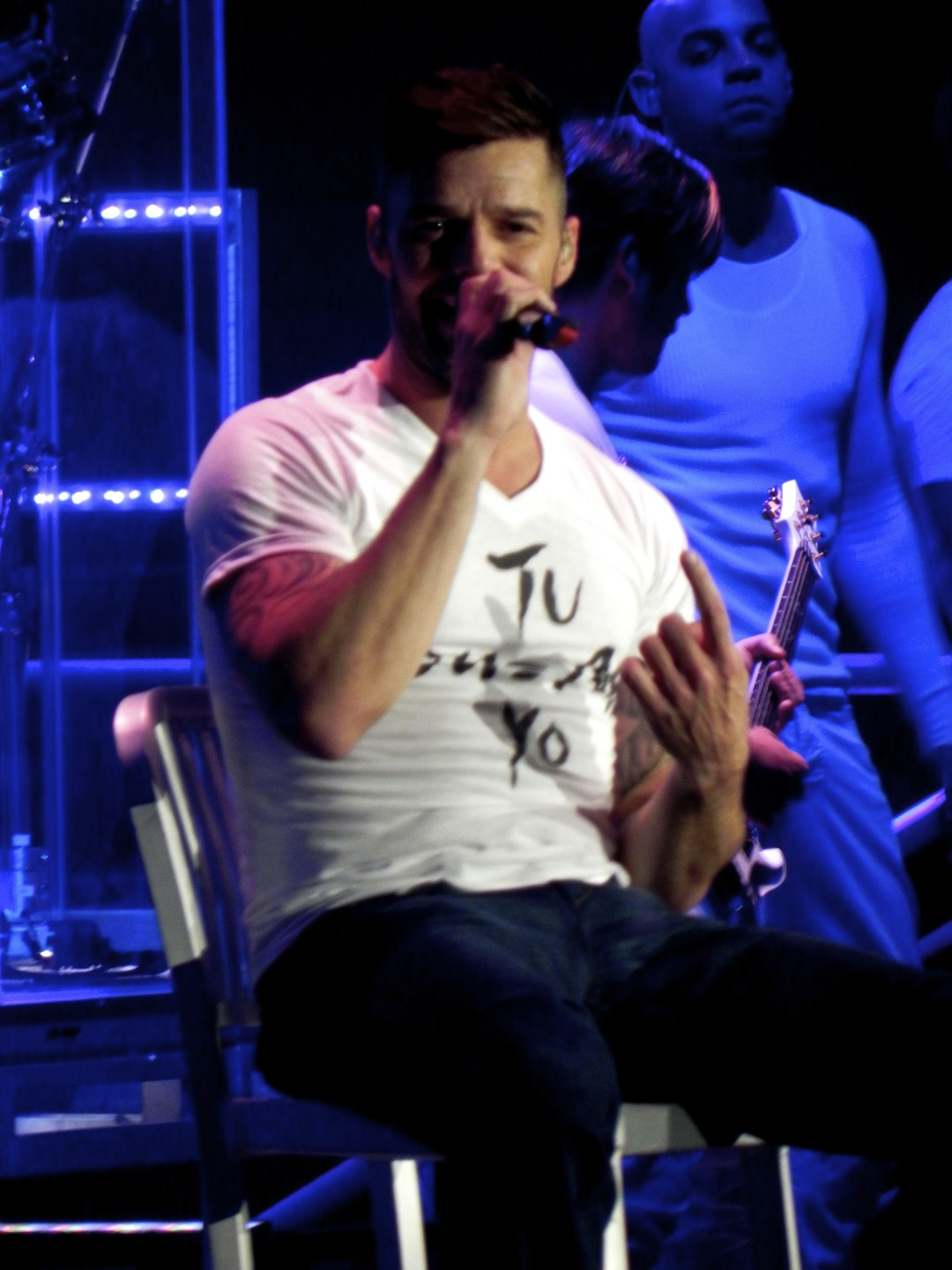
Ricky Martin was announced as Urban's replacement for the second series.

In May 2011, The Daily Telegraph reported that the Nine Network would broadcast The Voice in late 2011. However, two months later, it was reported that the show would instead air in early 2012, and that the Nine Network were in talks with signing at least one international artist (especially an American) to lead its panel of coaches on the show, which were rumoured to be Christina Aguilera, George Michael, Usher, Pink and Gwen Stefani. In September 2011, the Herald Sun reported that the Nine Network were planning to sign Australia's Got Talent judge Dannii Minogue as one of the coaches. Anthony Callea, Vanessa Amorosi and former Pussycat Dolls member Ashley Roberts all publicly expressed interest in coaching roles. However, Keith Urban, Delta Goodrem, Seal and Joel Madden were ultimately confirmed as the four coaches for the first season. On signing the four coaches, Michael Healy, the Nine Network's Director of Television, said: "To secure such world-class coaches has been a coup for this show and the network. The mix of talent and unique format will, we truly believe, be a captivating experience for our viewers."

Darren McMullen was announced as the host of the program in January 2012. Additionally, Ricki-Lee Coulter (with Seal), Darren Hayes, (Goodrem), Megan Washington (Urban) and Benji Madden (with brother Joel) were signed to pair up with the coaches as mentors for their contestants during the "Battle Round". On 10 May 2012, Faustina Agolley was announced as the show's social media correspondent during the live shows.

Filming for the blind auditions stage of the competition began on 19 February 2012 at Fox Studios in Sydney, with 121 artists featured in this phase of the selection process. The first day of filming resulted in hundreds of audience members being turned away from the studio due to overbooking of the event by an external booking agent. Filming for the battle rounds started in late March. In response to the immediate ratings success of the blind auditions, the Nine Network renewed the series for a second season on 27 April 2012.

With Urban accepting an offer to join the American Idol judging panel it was announced in September 2012 that he would not be returning as a coach for the second season. Following an extensive search process by producers, and constant media speculation on who would replace Urban, Ricky Martin was officially announced as the new coach in November 2012. In response to joining the series, Martin paid tribute to Urban saying he was "humbled to be sitting in his chair". Healy stated that Martin would bring "huge experience" and be the "perfect addition" to the coaching panel, with Goodrem, Madden and Seal all publicly expressing excitement at the news via their Twitter accounts.

The success of the first season led to the Nine Network increasing its programming run for the second season, with an extra ten hours of content to be broadcast and the season running for approximately three months instead of two. For 2014, Goodrem left the panel to join The Voice Kids, and Seal left to continue on his music career. Goodrem and Seal were in turn replaced by The Voice UK coaches Kylie Minogue and will.i.am. On 13 January 2015, it was announced that Goodrem would return to the panel, and new judges Jessie J and Benji Madden would join the series, replacing former judges Minogue and will.i.am. On 22 February 2015, it was announced that Sonia Kruger would be joining the fourth season as a co-host with McMullen. In 2015, Darren McMullen announced he was leaving The Voice, with Sonia Kruger to be a solo host in 2016.

On 28 December 2015, Ronan Keating confirmed he would replace Martin on the show's fifth season, alongside returning coaches Goodrem, Jessie J and The Madden Brothers. On 19 June 2016, it was announced that pop duo The Veronicas will briefly replace The Madden Brothers as coaches for the second live show on Sunday 19 June while the brothers are in the US on tour due to band commitments. The brothers are to due back on screen for the rest of the live shows. During an interview with NewsLitmited, the sisters stated "It's a very brutal industry to be in. We are very honest, very upfront and very real about the advice we give. We're not going to be sugar coating anything. There's not going to be anything contrived about our time on the show." Jessie J ruled out returning to the show for the 2017 show and stated "I've loved doing the show, I've done four seasons: two in the U.K., two in Sydney, but I just need to make another album."

On 8 November 2016, it was announced that Goodrem would return for her fifth season as a coach, whilst original judge Seal, who departed the series following the second season, would return and replaced Jessie J. On 8 December 2016, it was announced that Boy George would become the third coach for the series' sixth season replacing The Madden Brothers. On 24 December 2016, it was announced that Kelly Rowland would become the fourth and final coach for the series' sixth season to replace Keating.

On 11 October 2017, the series was renewed for a seventh season and it was announced that Goodrem, George and Rowland would all return. On 14 December 2017, Nine announced Joe Jonas would replace Seal as the first judge for the seventh season.

On 17 October 2018, the series was renewed for an eighth season and it was announced that Goodrem, George and Rowland would all return. On 14 November 2018, Nine announced Guy Sebastian would replace Jonas as the first judge for the eighth season. The eighth season premiered on 19 May 2019.

On 16 October 2019, the series was renewed for a ninth season and it was announced that Goodrem, George, Rowland and Sebastian would all be returning as series judges. In November 2019, Sonia Kruger announced she would be leaving Nine Network at the end of 2019, in which she would be resigning as the show's host. In January 2020, Darren McMullen was announced to return as host after his departure in 2014, along with new co-host Renee Bargh.

Due to the Acquisition of 21st Century Fox by Disney, Fox Studios has been designated to Disney and Marvel productions, resulting in ITV Studios Australia becoming the new home location for The Voice. In August 2020, it was announced Seven Network had picked up the series for its tenth season, set to broadcast sometime in the following year, with Kruger returning as host. In December of the same year, Seven announced Sebastian would continue as a coach; Jessica Mauboy and former The Voice UK coach Rita Ora were named new coaches replacing Boy George and Goodrem, and Urban was announced to return to the coaching panel replacing Rowland.

On 16 July 2021, Seven Network and The Voice casting website announced that two new seasons would be broadcast in 2022: the eleventh regular season, and The Voice Generations. For the "generations" version, family groups, consisted in people of several ages, are the ones who can apply. On 11 October 2021, it was confirmed that Sebastian, Urban, Ora, and Mauboy would all be returning as coaches for 2022.

On 9 October 2022, Urban announced that he would not be a coach for the twelfth season. On 30 October 2022, it was announced that Mauboy would be returning for her third season as a coach. In March 2023, Jason Derulo was announced as a new coach taking the place of Urban, while Sebastian and Ora would also be returning as coaches.

In January 2024, it was confirmed that Mauboy, Ora, and Derulo would depart the panel for the thirteenth season, while Sebastian was confirmed to be returning to the panel. In February 2024, it was announced that Kate Miller-Heidke, LeAnn Rimes and Adam Lambert would join the panel for season 13. In October 2024, Sebastian announced that he would not be a coach on the upcoming fourteenth season.

In January 2025, it was announced that Miller-Heidke would be the only coach returning for the fourteenth season from the previous season. At the same time, it was announced that Keating would return to the panel after an eight-season hiatus, while former The Voice Kids UK coach Melanie C and Richard Marx would be joining the panel as new coaches. On 22 October 2025, it was announced that Miller-Heidke, Keating, Melanie C, and Marx would all be returning as coaches for 2026. On 8 June 2026, it was announced that Tones and I would join the fifteenth season as the fifth coach, marking the first instance of five coaches in the history of the show.

== Coaches and hosts ==
Coaches gallery

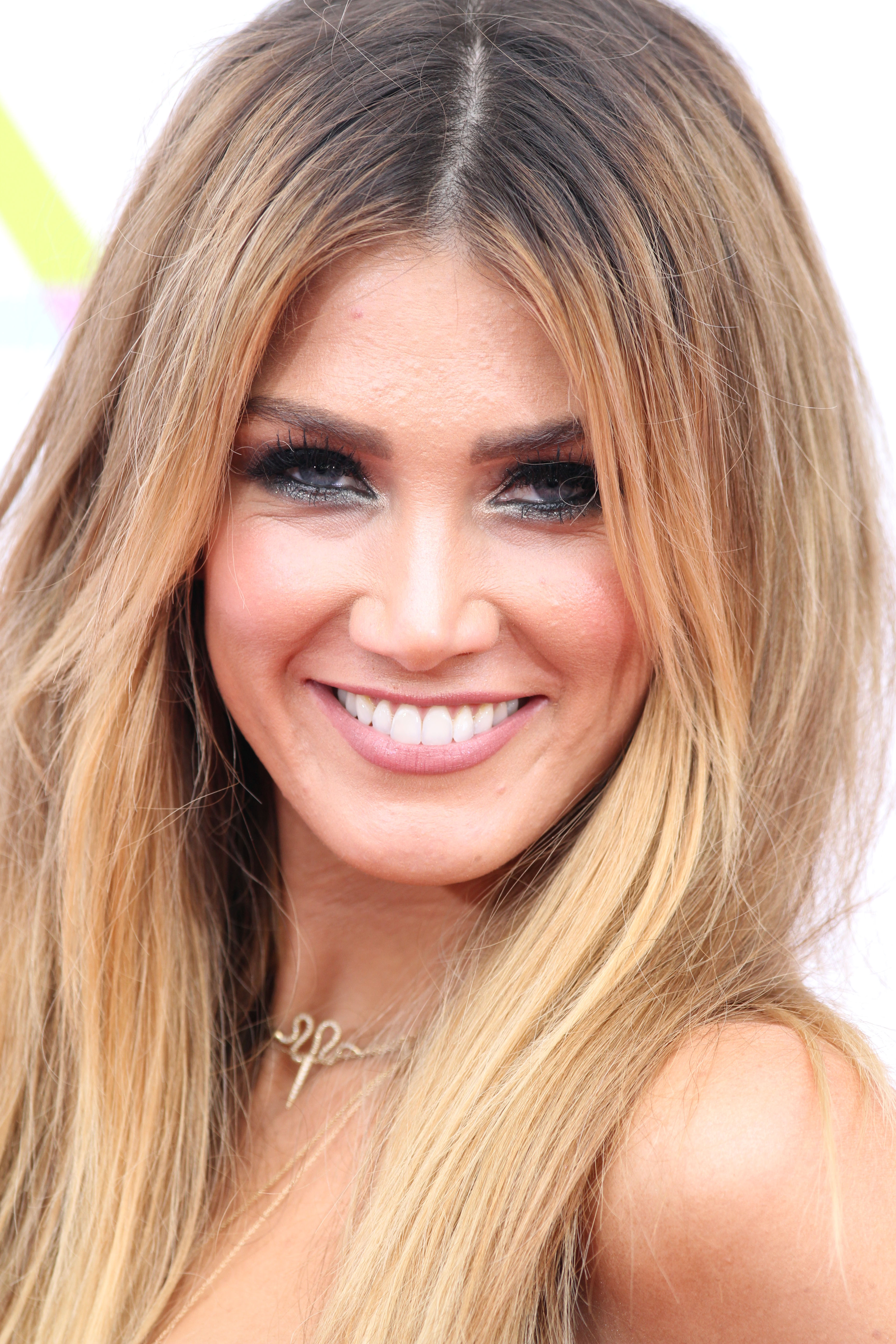
Delta Goodrem (2012–2013, 2015–2020)

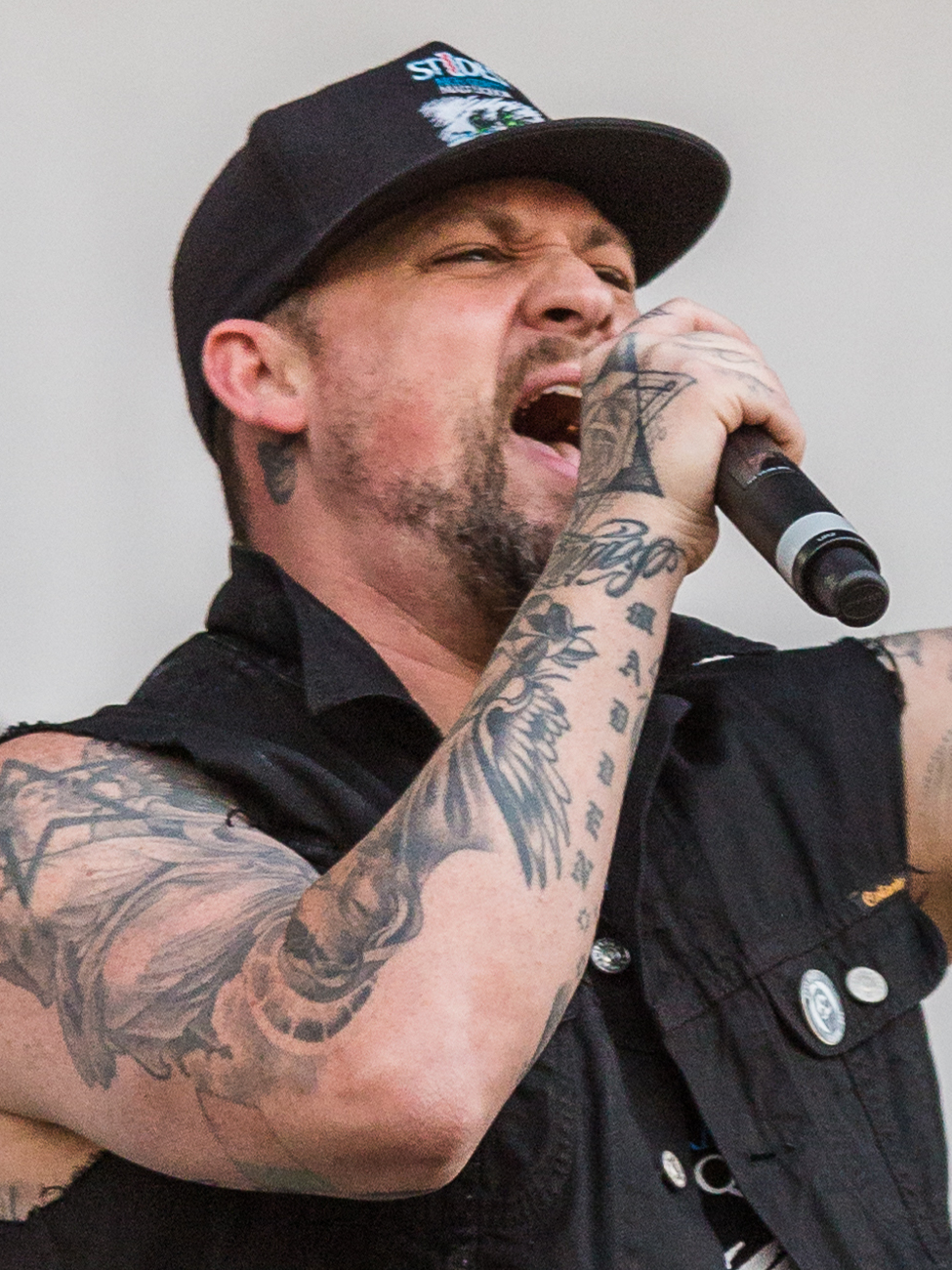
Joel Madden (solo: 2012–2014, duo: 2015–2016)

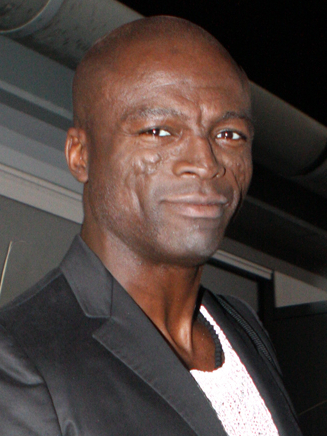
Seal (2012–2013, 2017)

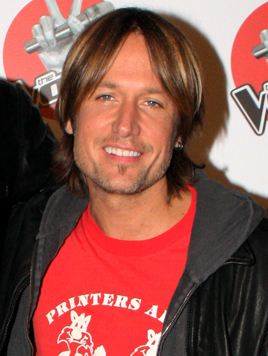
Keith Urban (2012, 2021–2022)

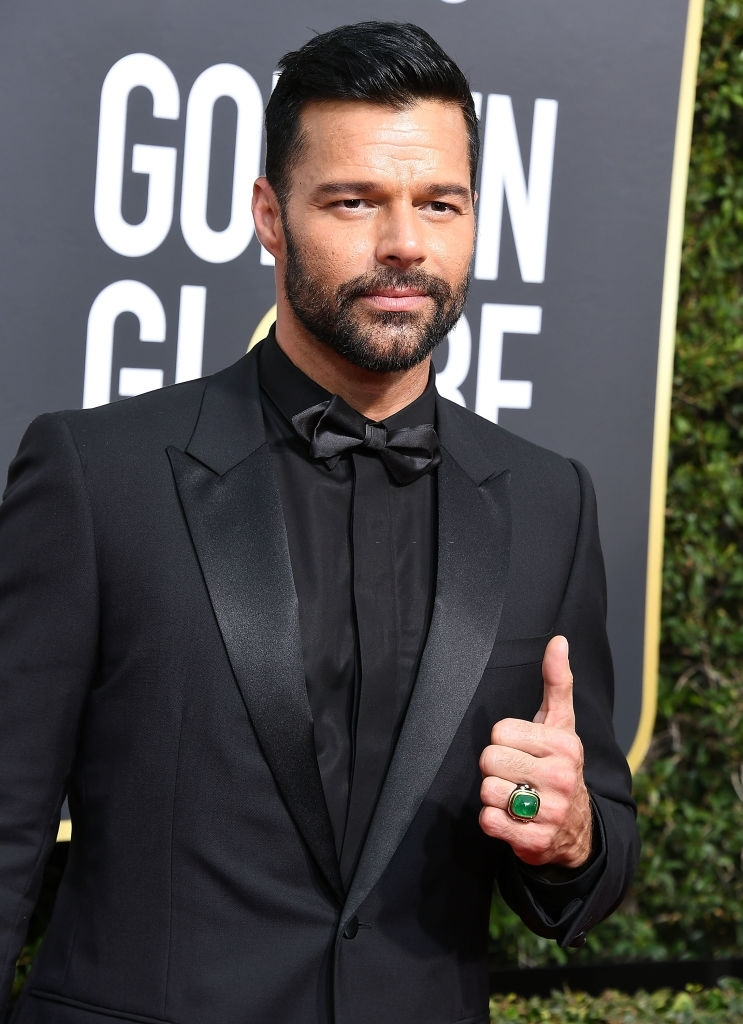
Ricky Martin (2013–2015)

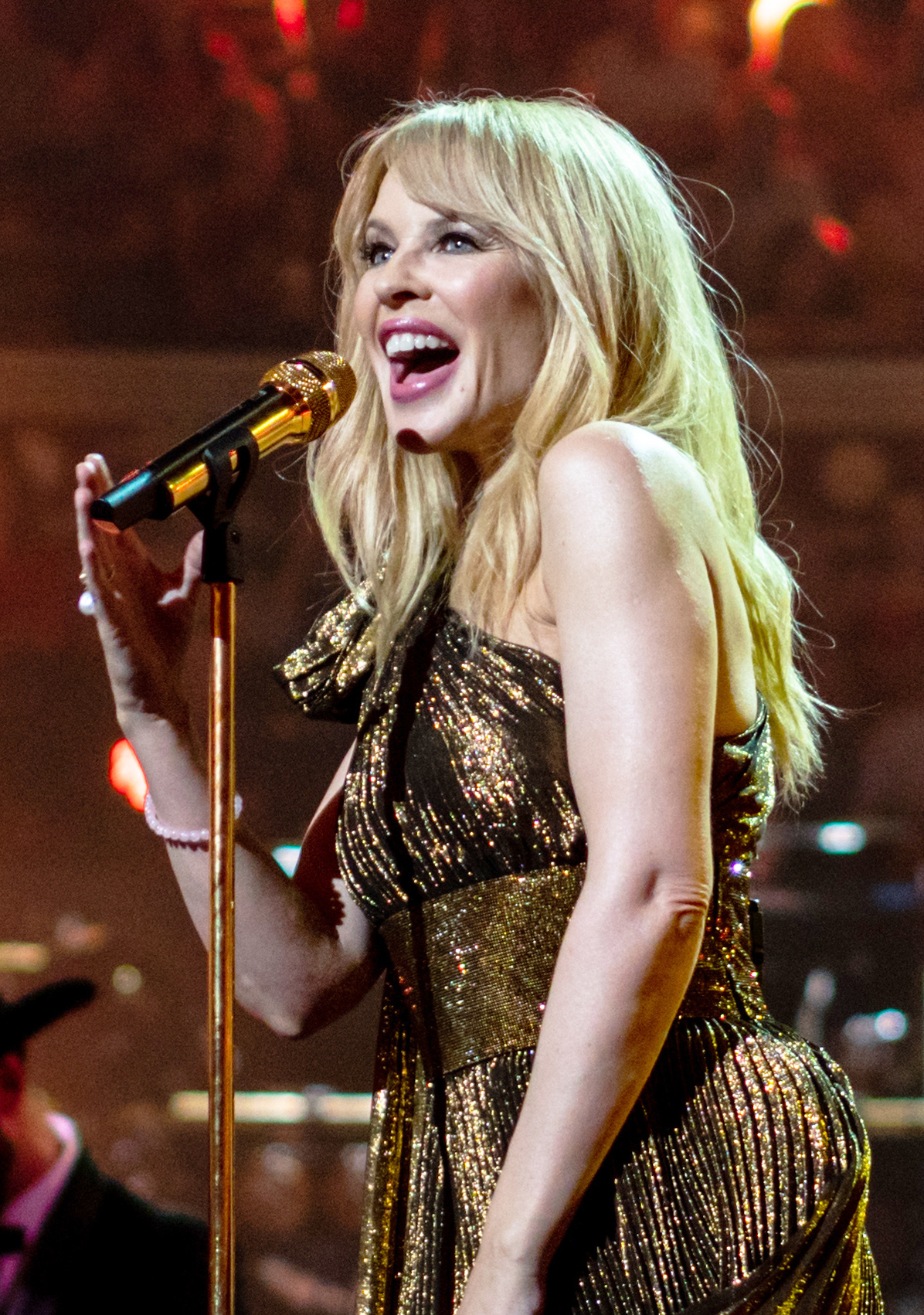
Kylie Minogue (2014)

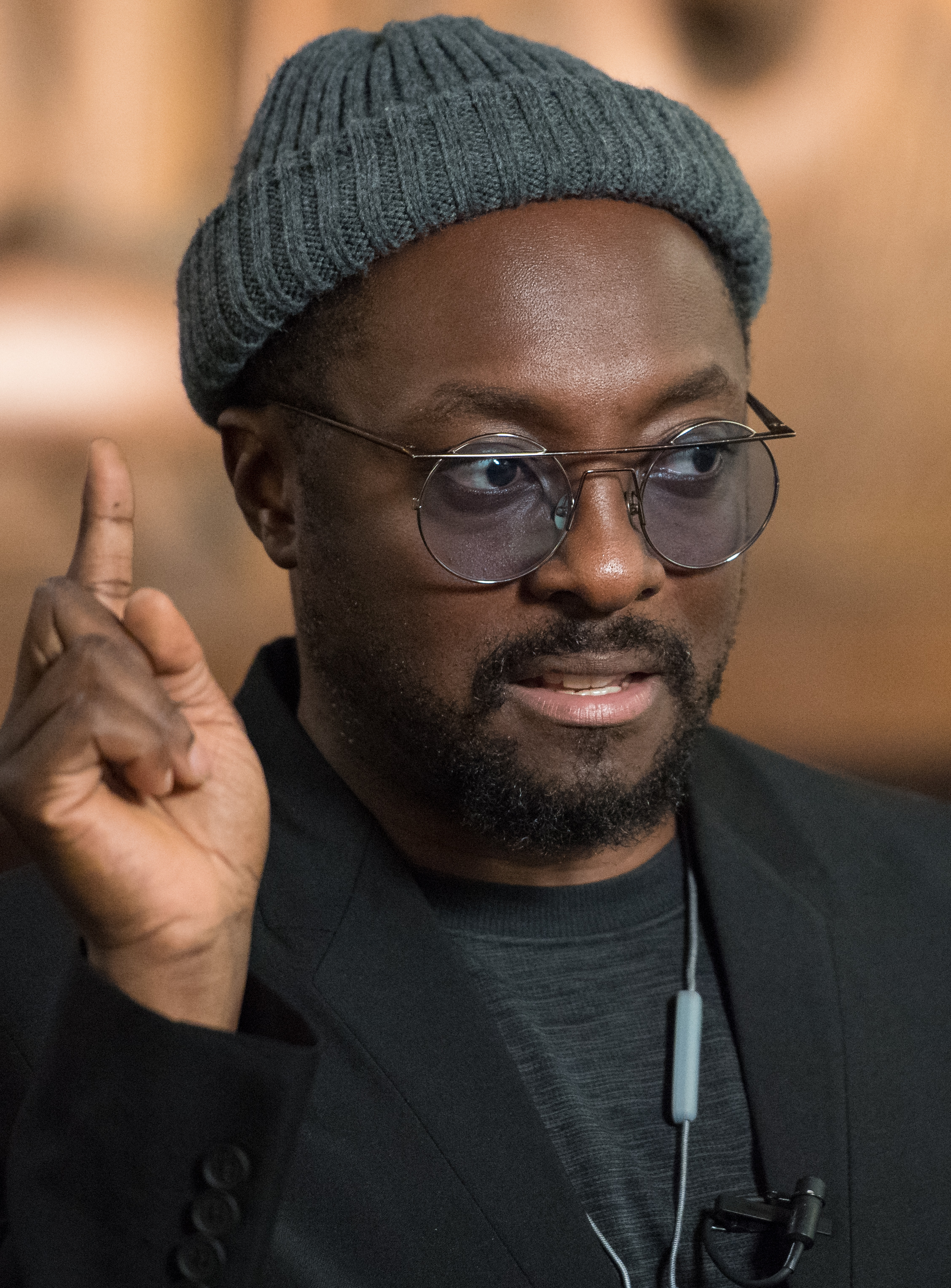
will.i.am (2014)

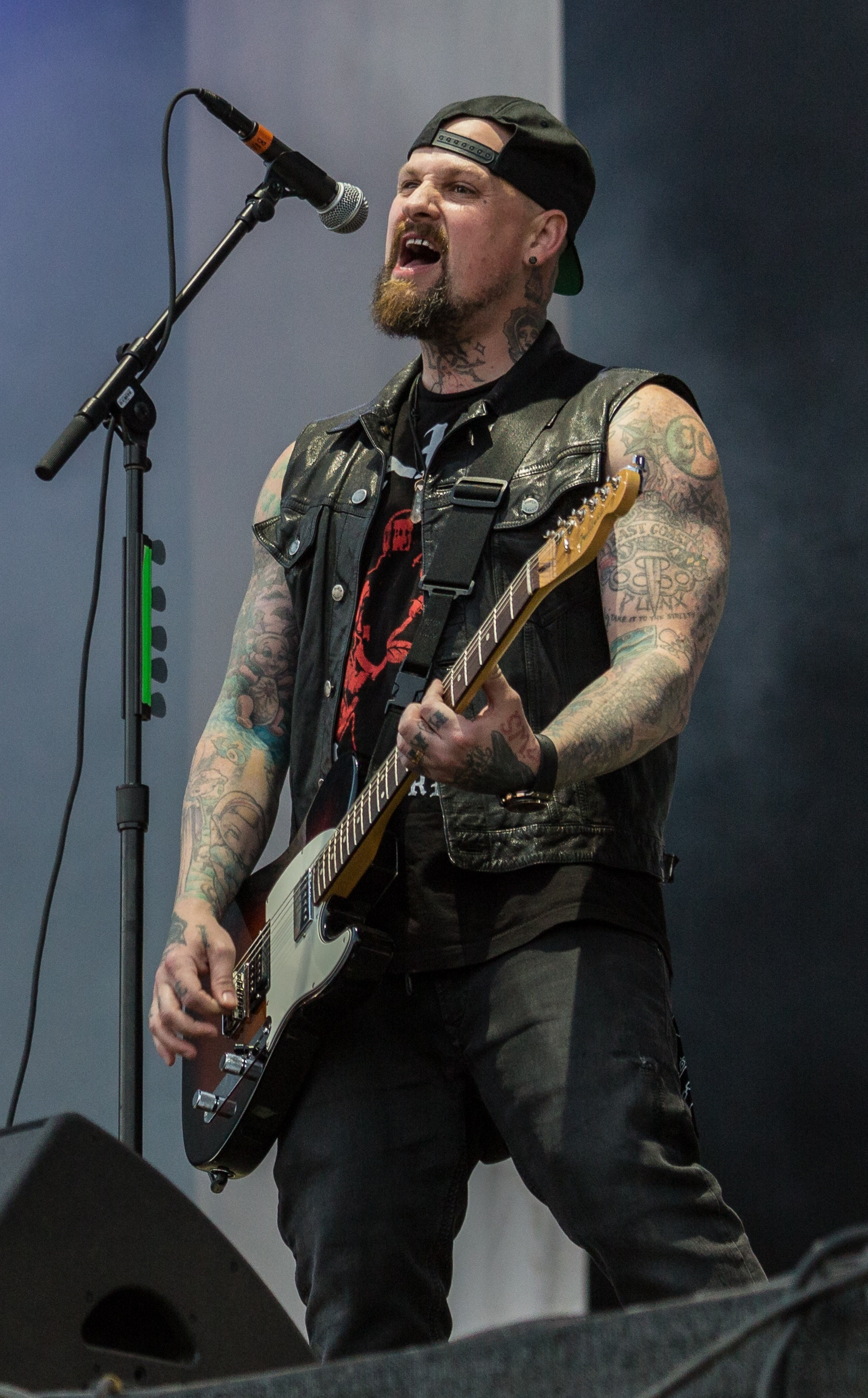
Benji Madden (2015–2016)

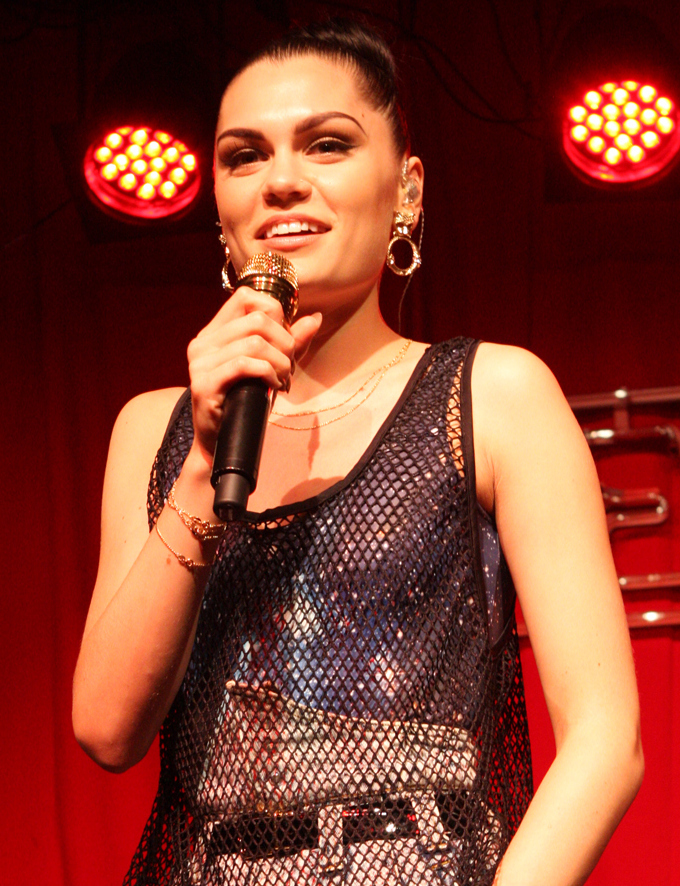
Jessie J (2015–2016)

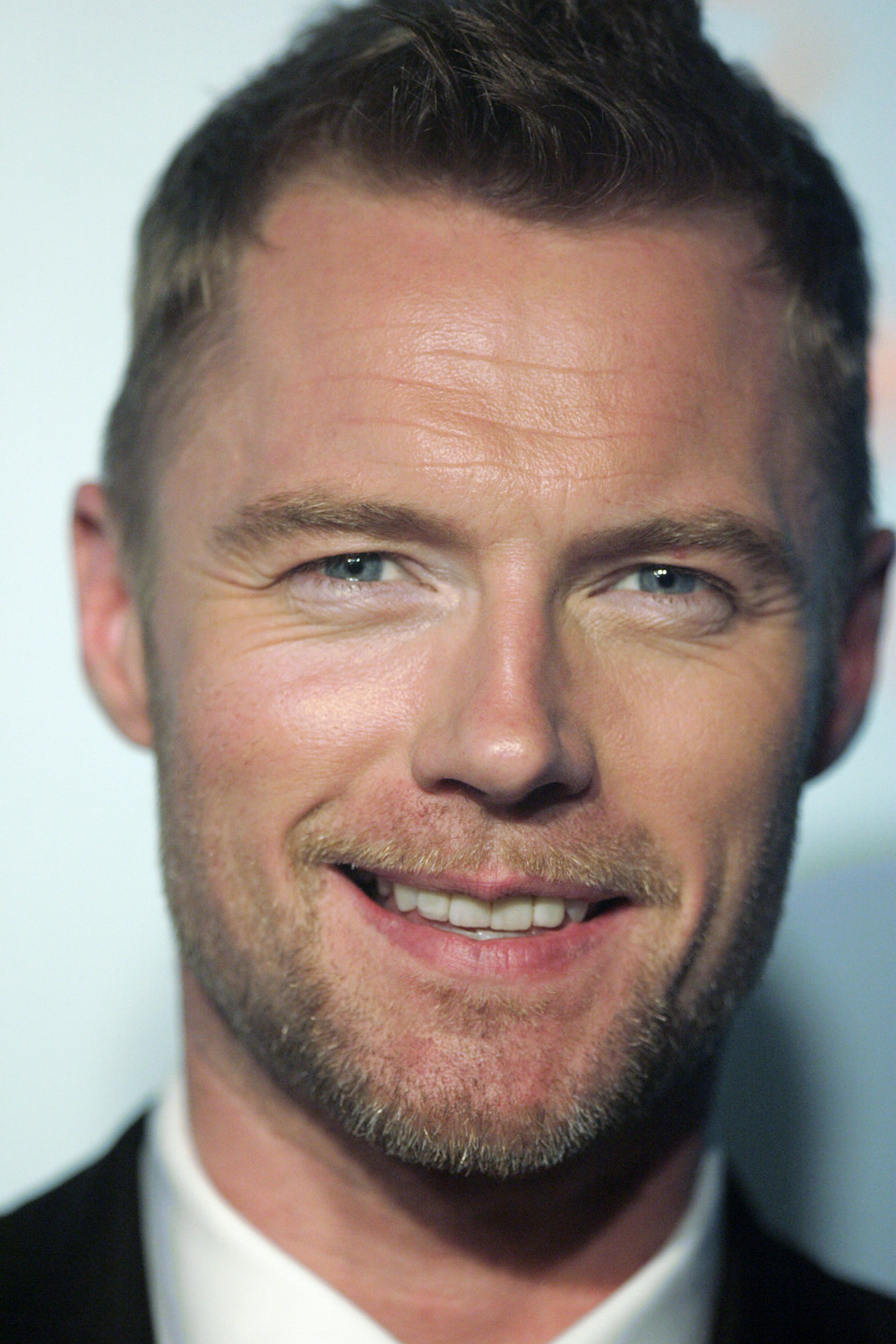
Ronan Keating (2016, 2025–)

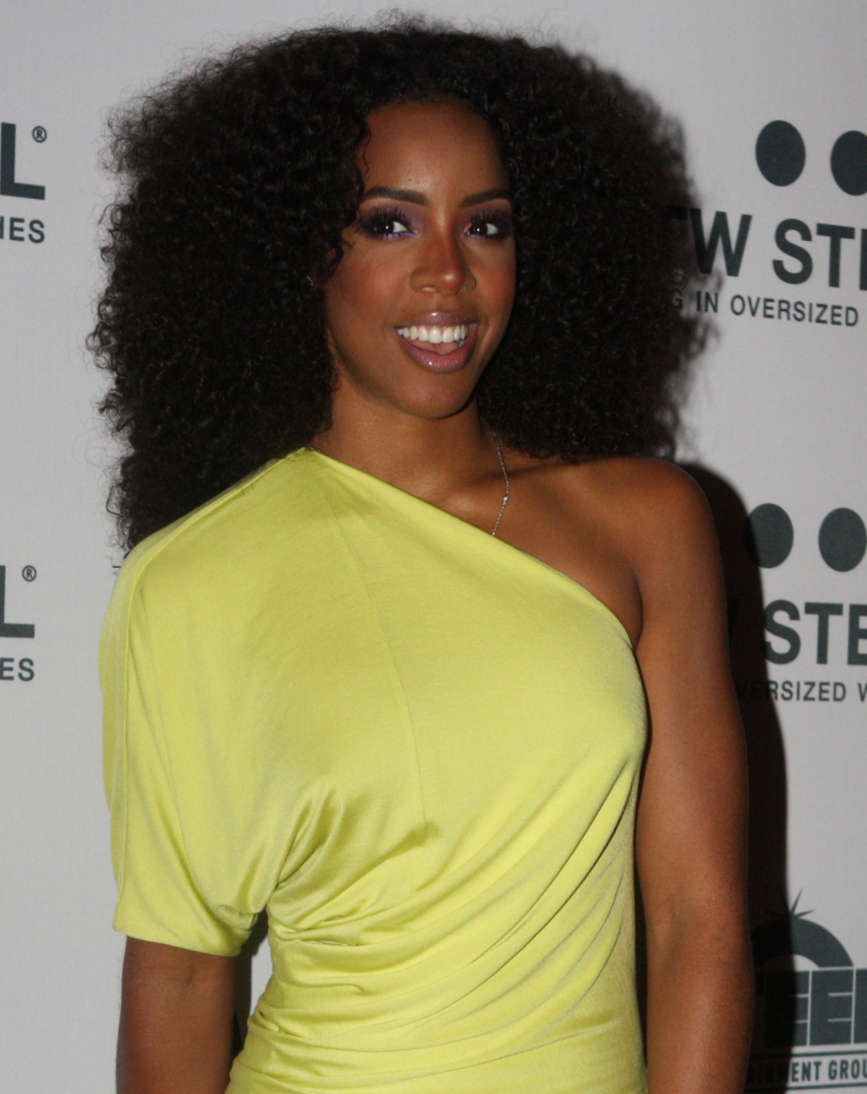
Kelly Rowland (2017–2020)

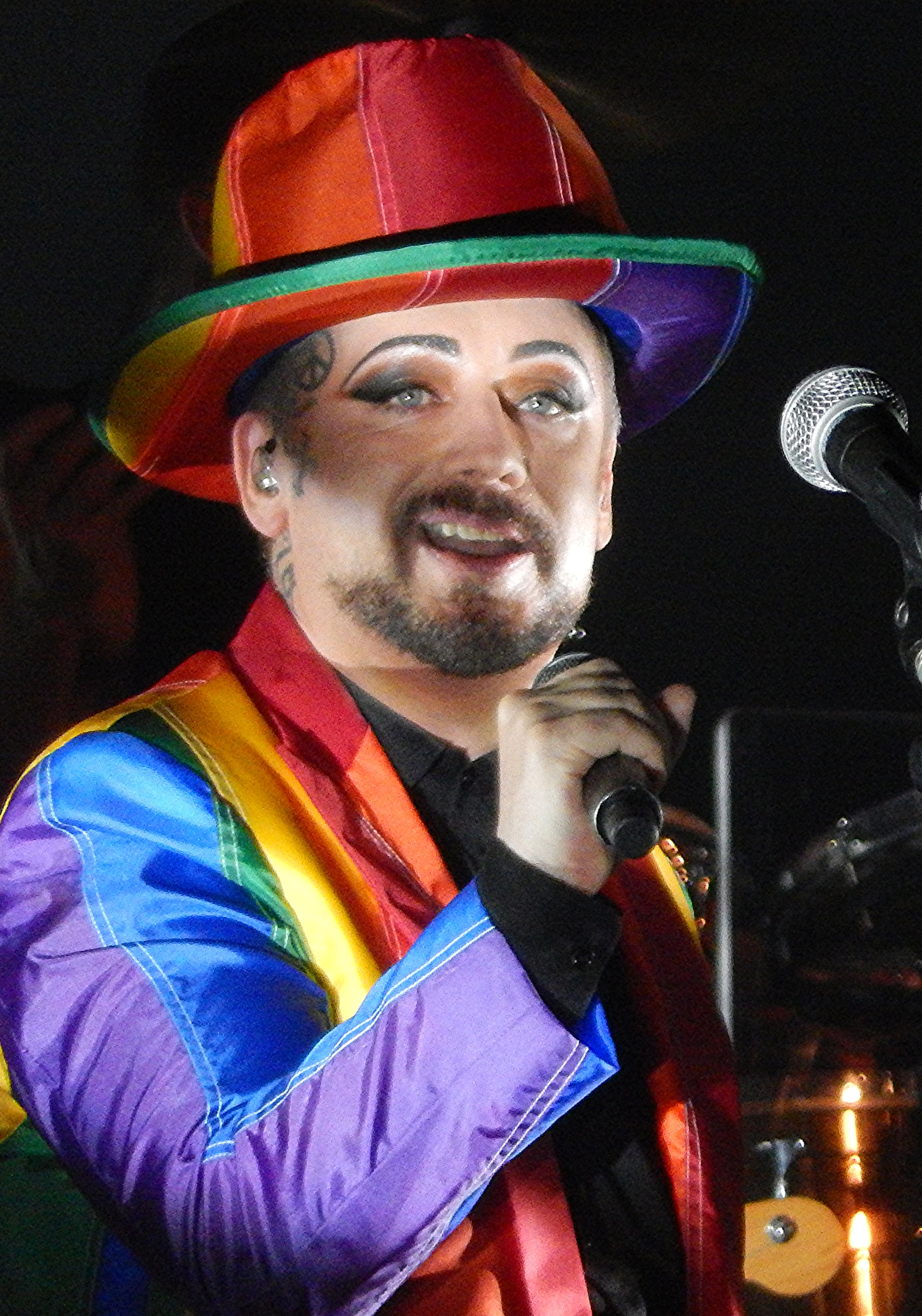
Boy George (2017–2020)

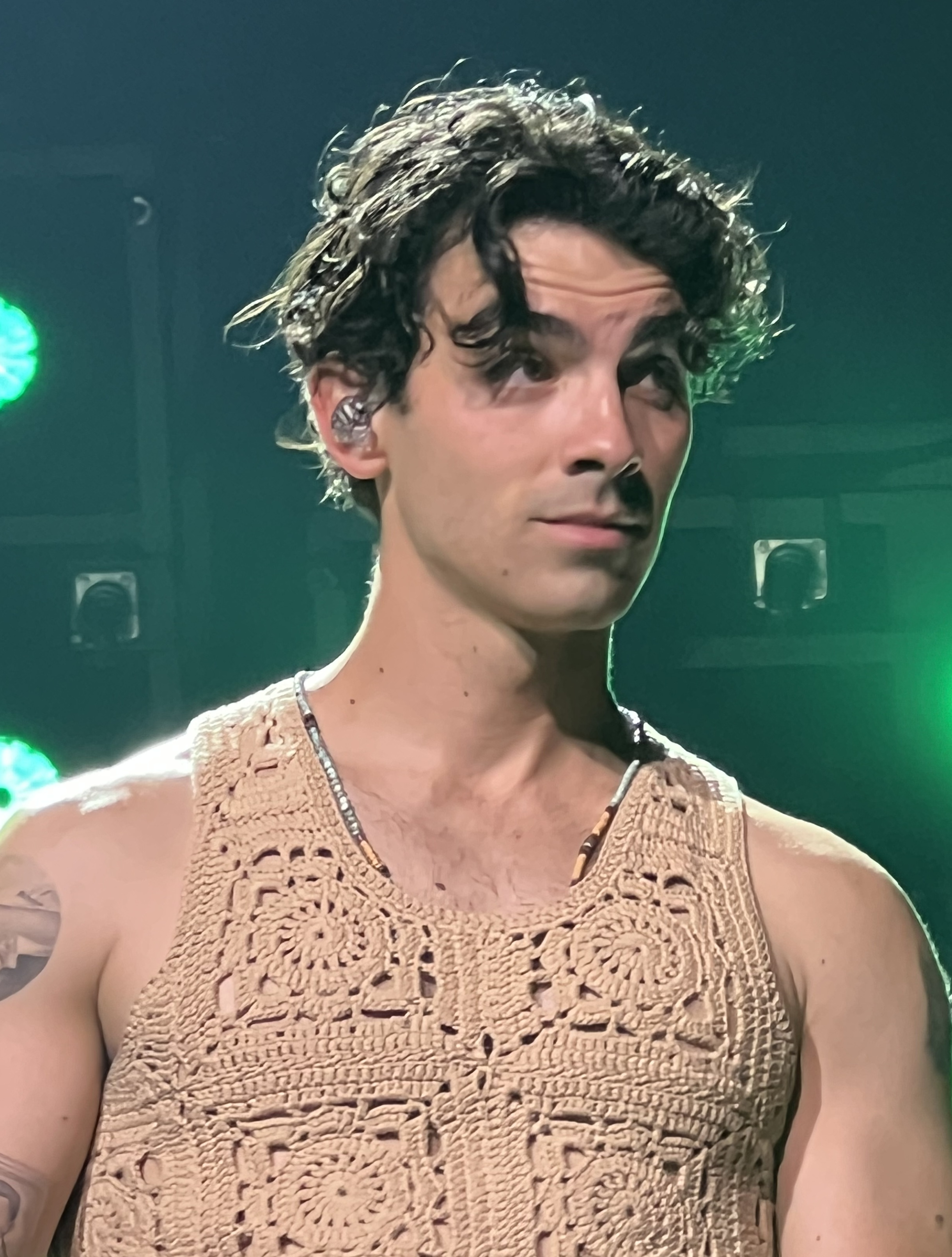
Joe Jonas (2018)

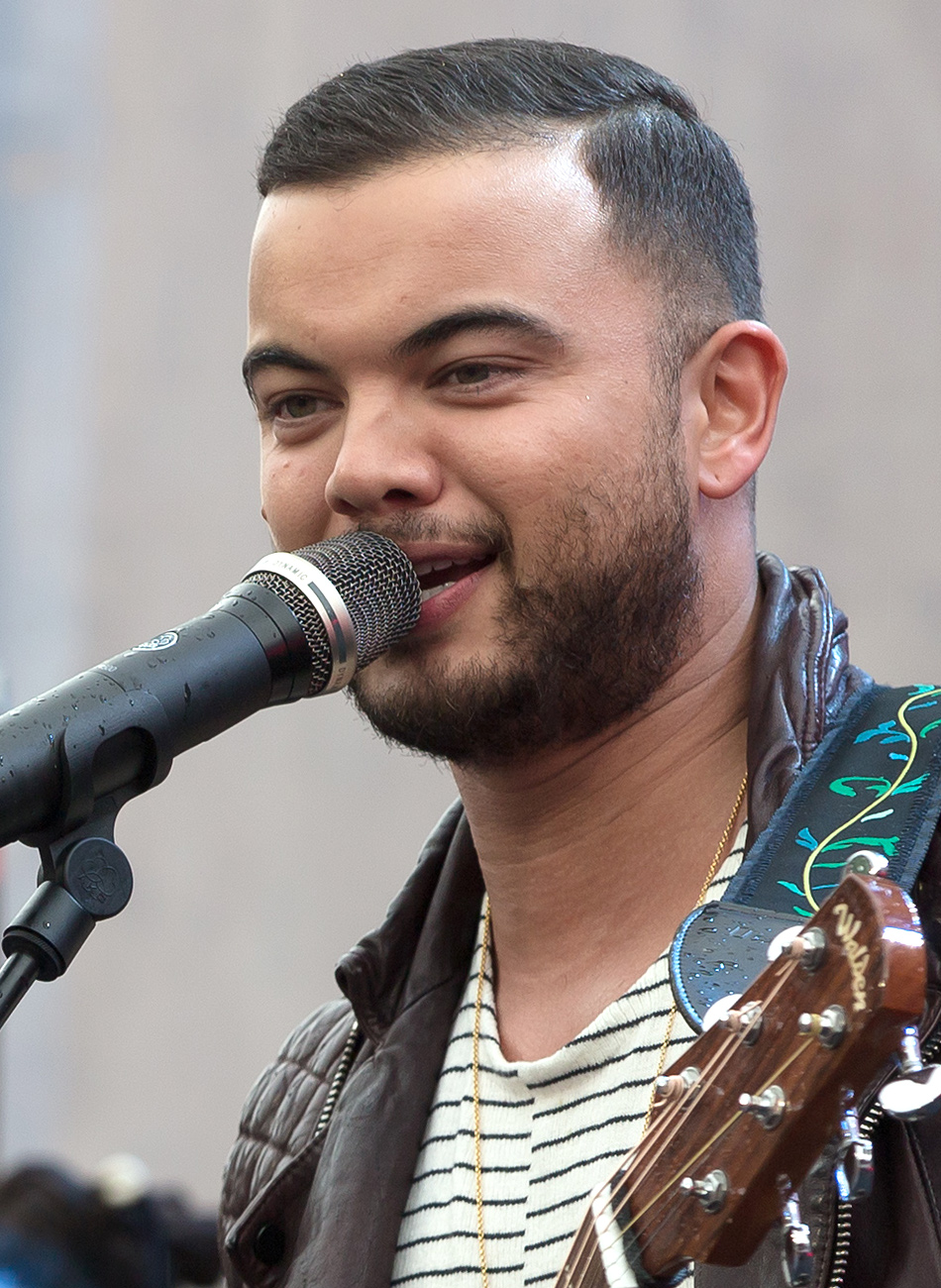
Guy Sebastian (2019–2024)

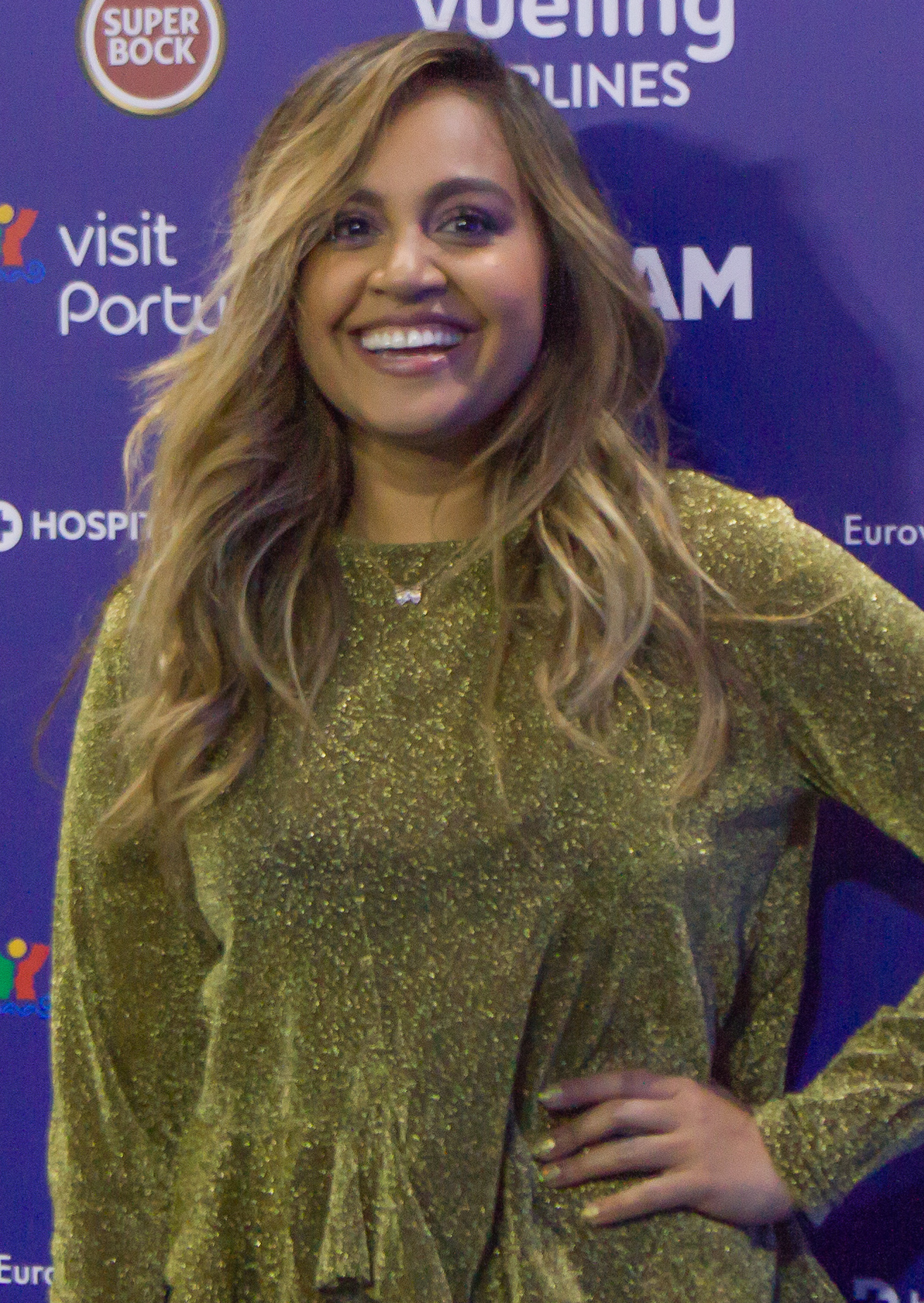
Jessica Mauboy (2021–2023)

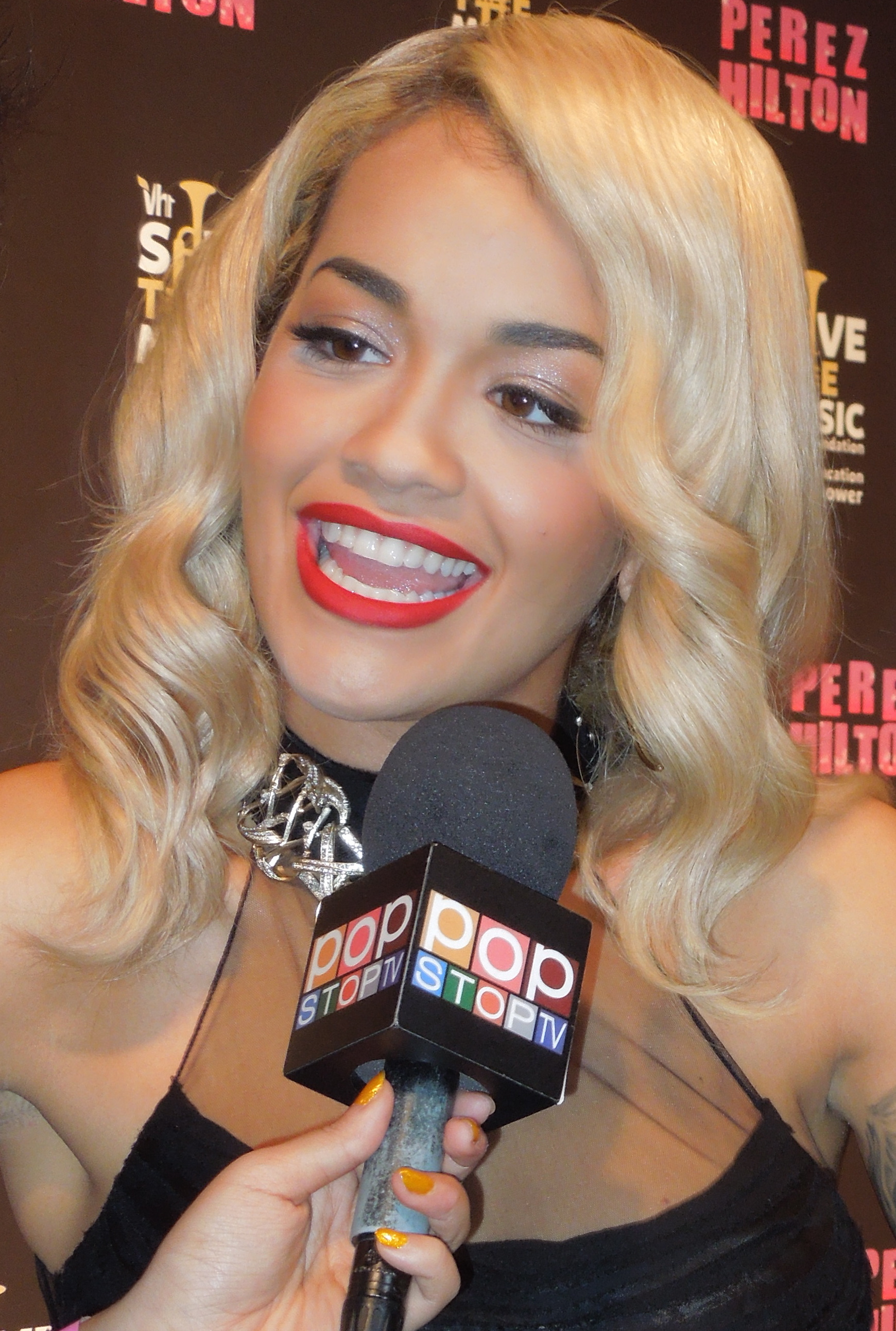
Rita Ora (2021–2023)

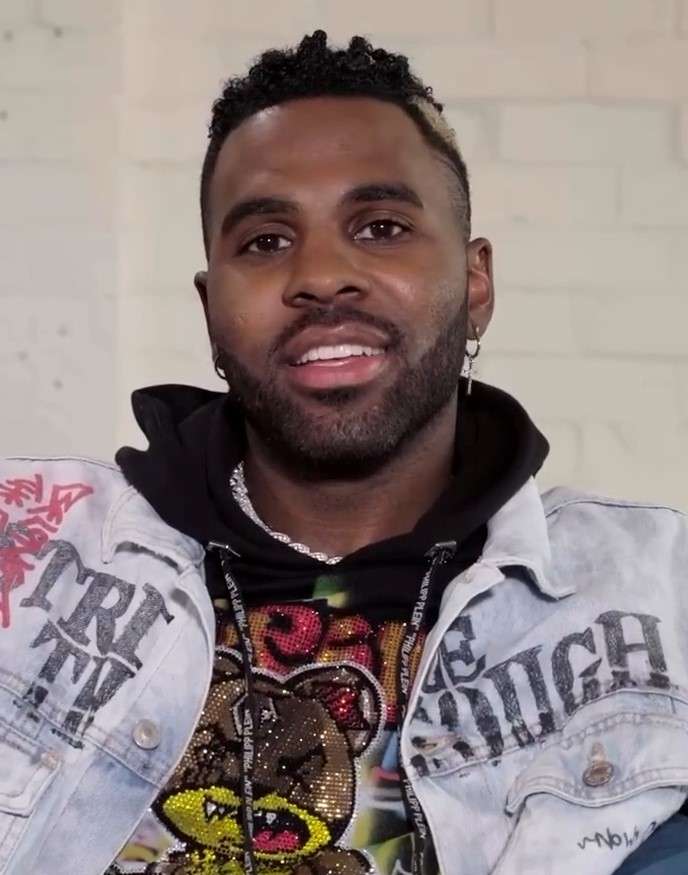
Jason Derulo (2023)

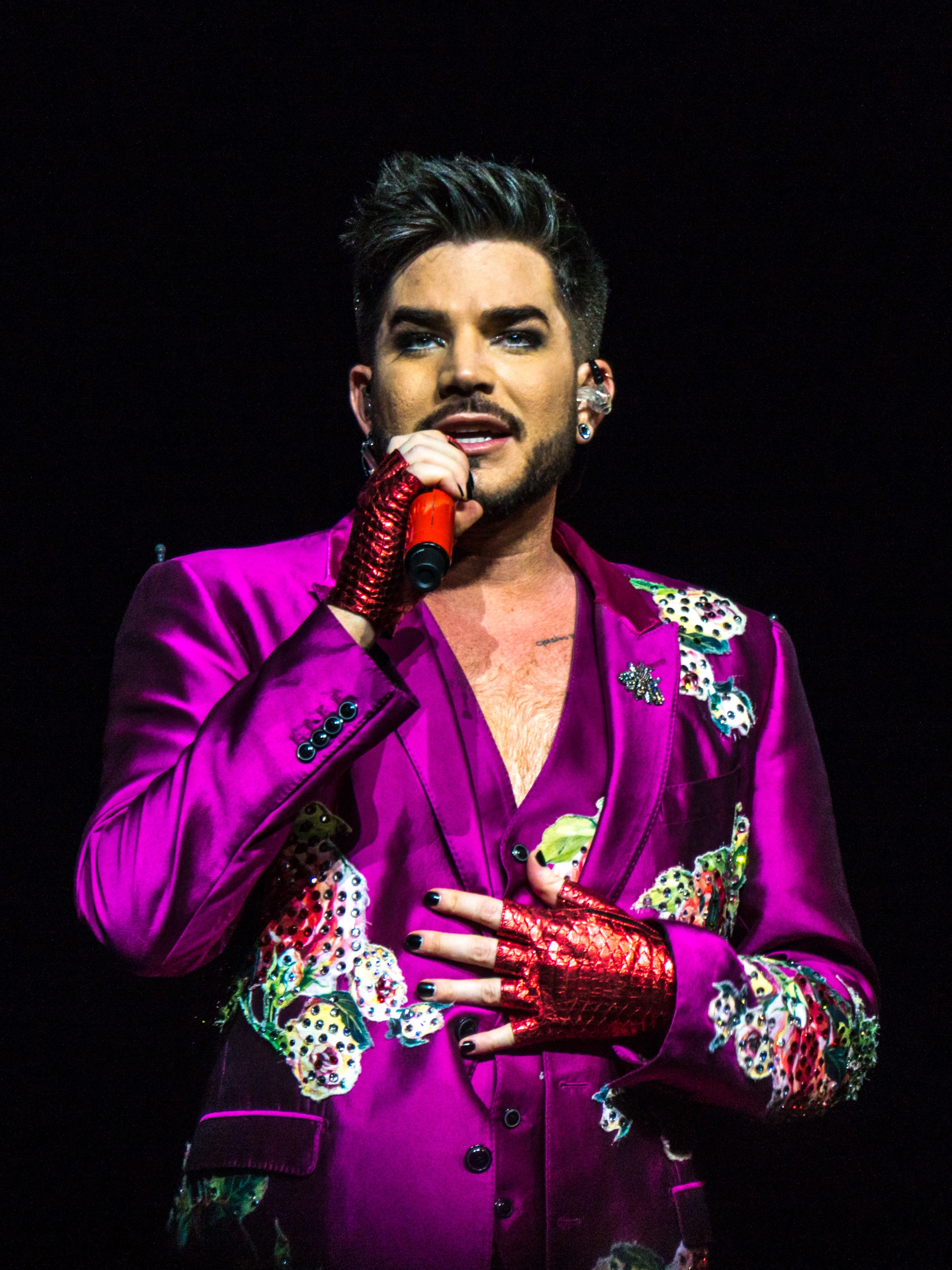
Adam Lambert (2024)

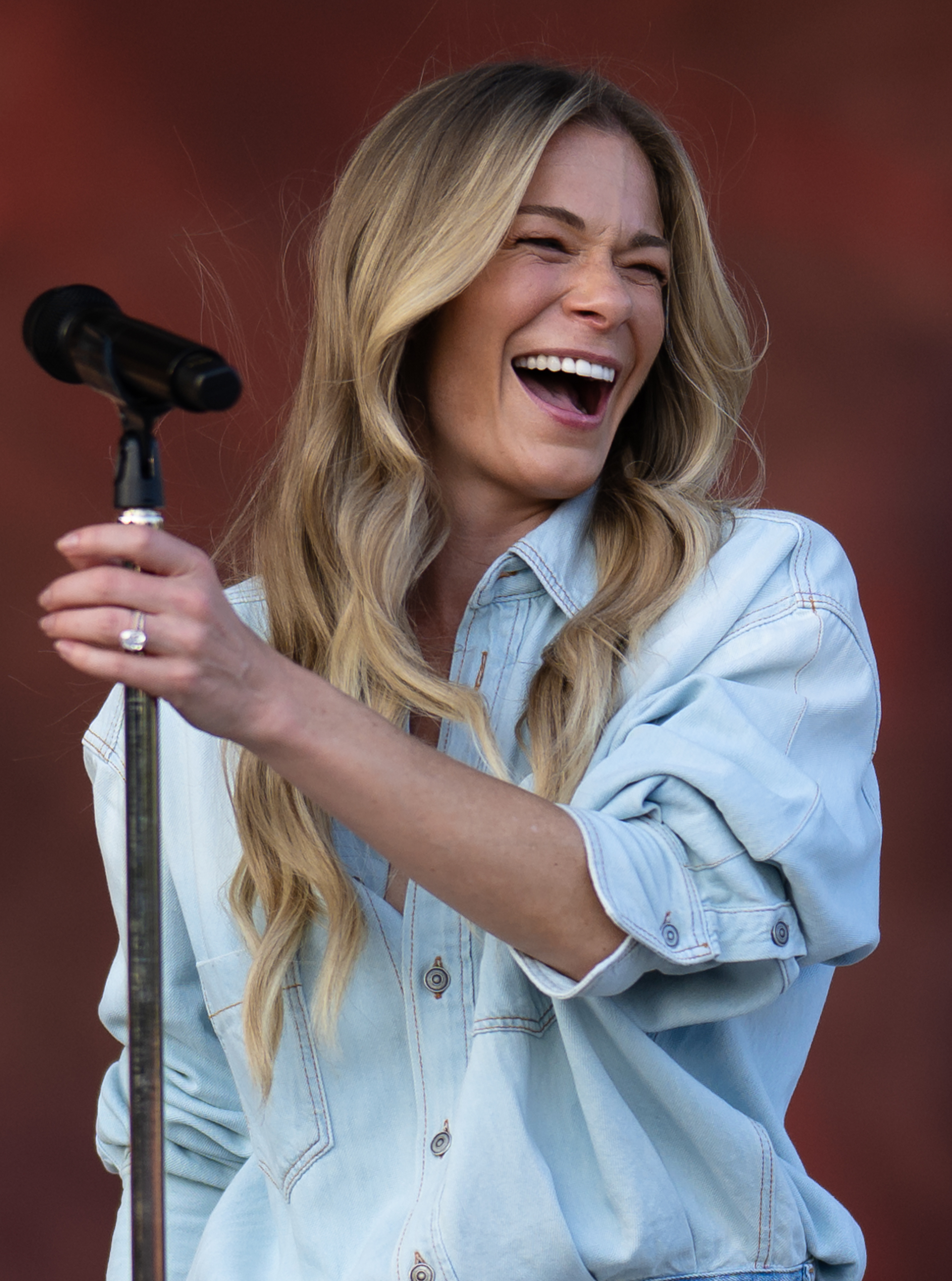
LeAnn Rimes (2024)

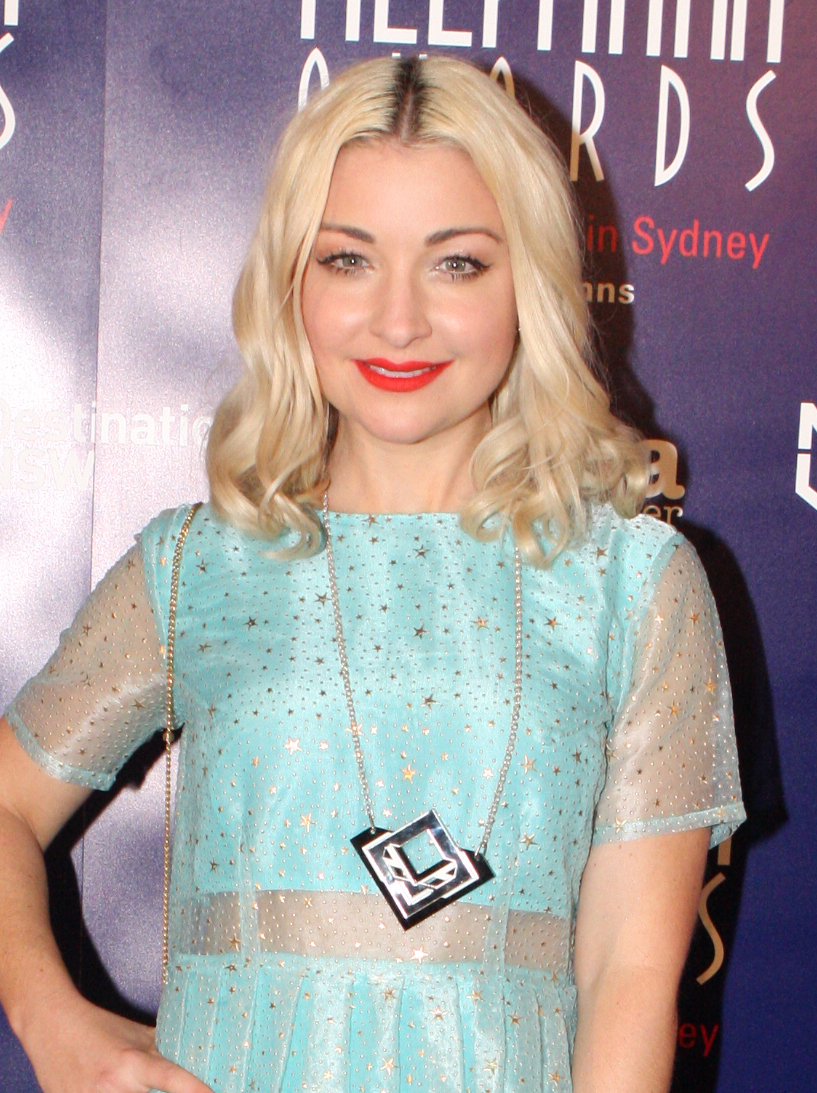
Kate Miller-Heidke (2024–)

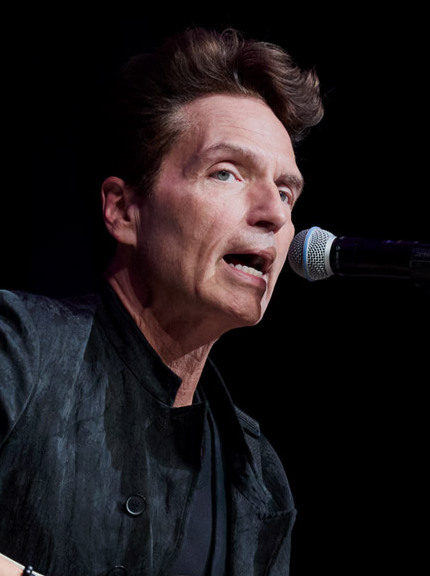
Richard Marx (2025–)

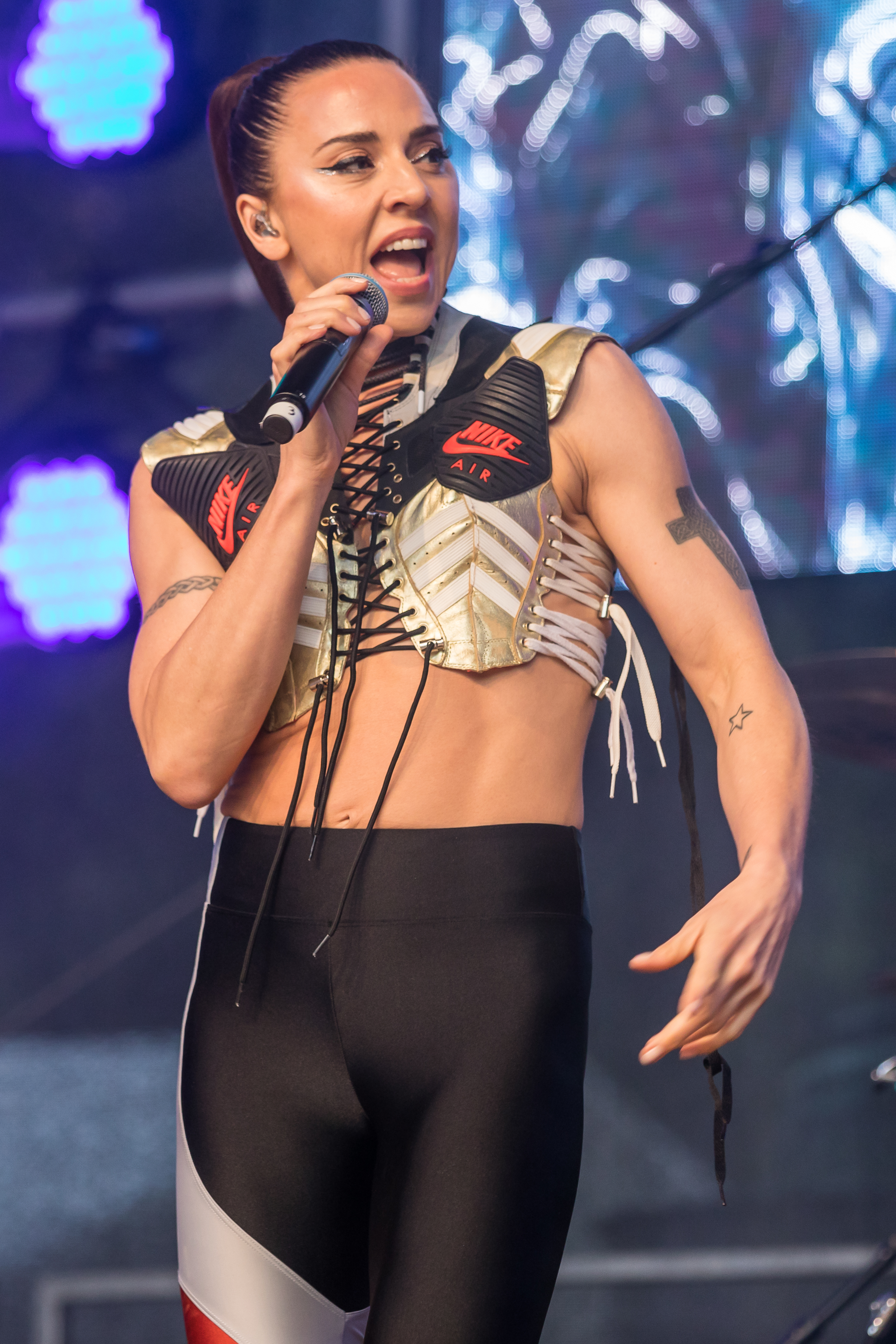
Melanie C (2025–)

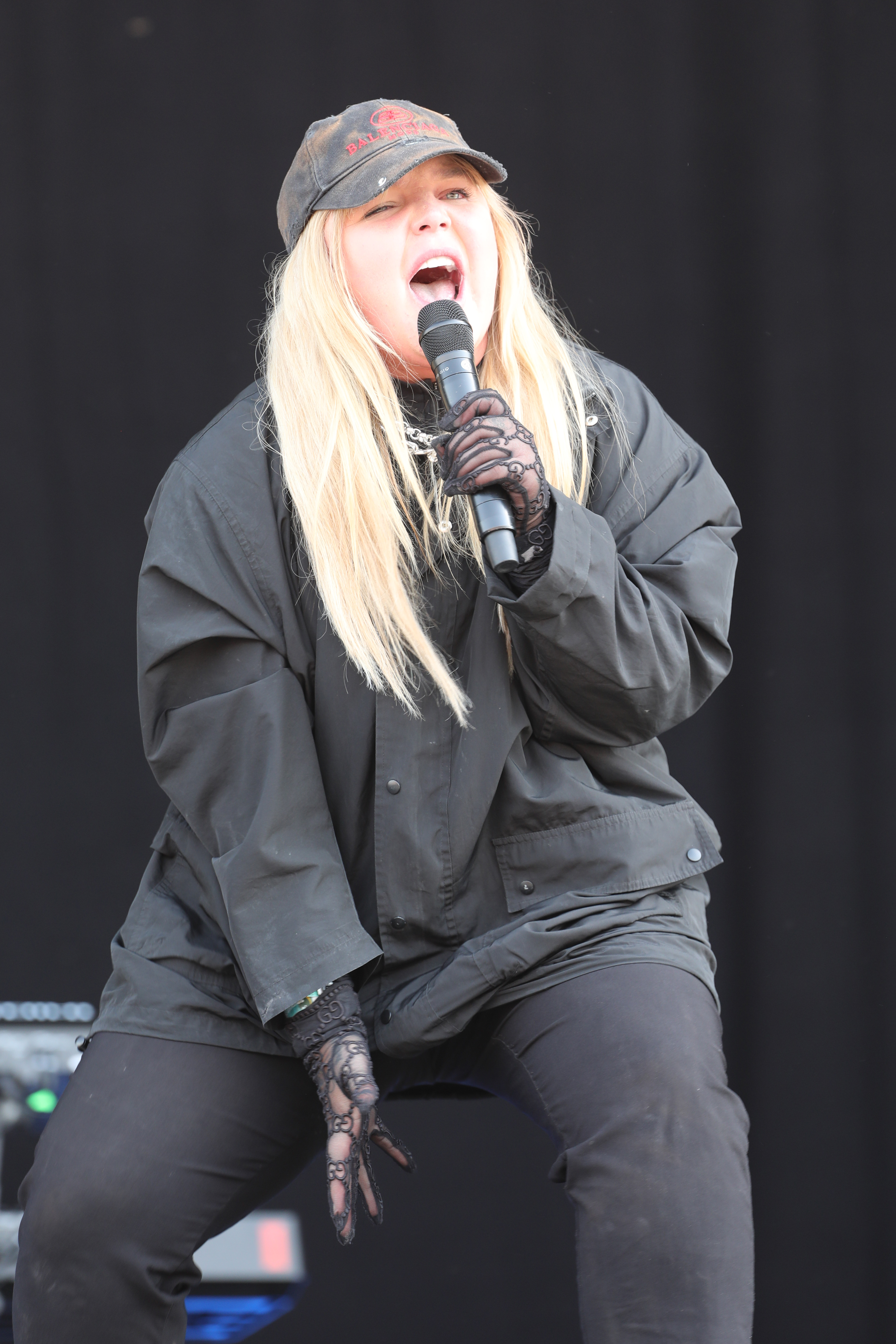
Tones and I (second chance, 2026–)

=== Timeline of coaches ===
Timeline of coaches
K	Coach	Seasons														
K	Coach	1	2	3	4	5	6	7	8	9	10	11	12	13	14	15
	Seal															
	Joel Madden															
	Delta Goodrem															
	Keith Urban															
	Ricky Martin															
	will.i.am															
	Kylie Minogue															
	Jessie J															
	Madden Brothers															
	Ronan Keating															
	Kelly Rowland															
	Boy George															
	Joe Jonas															
	Guy Sebastian															
	Rita Ora															
	Jessica Mauboy															
	Jason Derulo															
	LeAnn Rimes															
	Adam Lambert															
	Kate Miller-Heidke															
	Richard Marx															
	Melanie C															
Tones and I																S.C.

==== Line-up of coaches ====
Coaches' line-up by chairs order
Season	Year	Coaches			
Season	Year	1	2	3	4
1	2012	Seal	Joel	Delta	Keith
2	2013	Seal	Joel	Delta	Ricky
3	2014	Will	Kylie	Joel	Ricky
4	2015	Ricky	Jessie	Delta	Joel & Benji
5	2016	Ronan	Jessie	Delta	Joel & Benji
6	2017	Seal	Delta	Kelly	George
7	2018	George	Kelly	Delta	Joe
8	2019	Kelly	Guy	Delta	George
9	2020	Guy	Delta	George	Kelly
10	2021	Keith	Rita	Jess	Guy
11	2022	Keith	Jess	Rita	Guy
12	2023	Guy	Jess	Jason	Rita
13	2024	Guy	LeAnn	Kate	Adam
14	2025	Kate	Ronan	Richard	Melanie C
15	2026	Ronan	Melanie C	Kate	Richard

=== Timeline of hosts ===
Hosts gallery

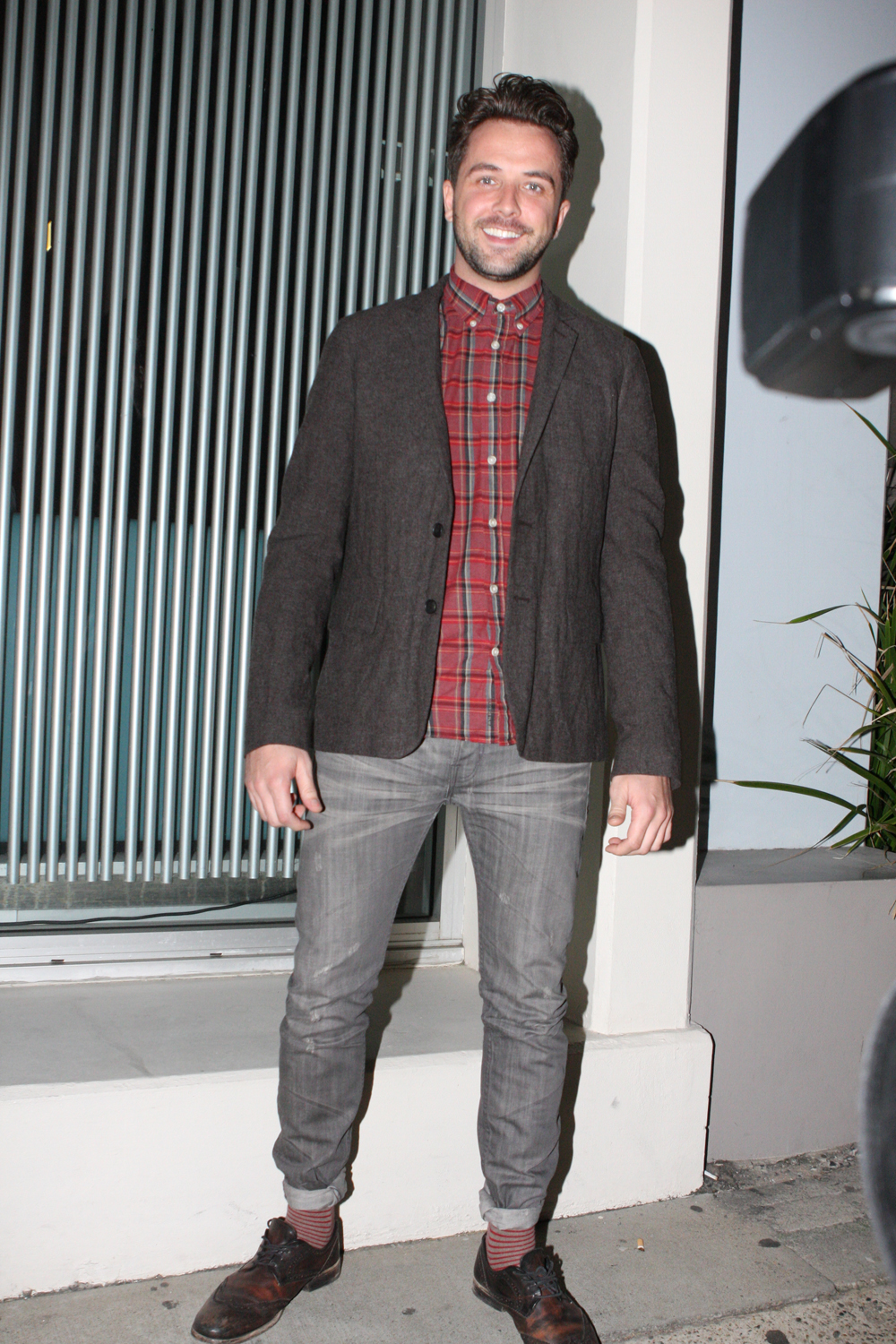
Darren McMullen (2012–2015, 2020)

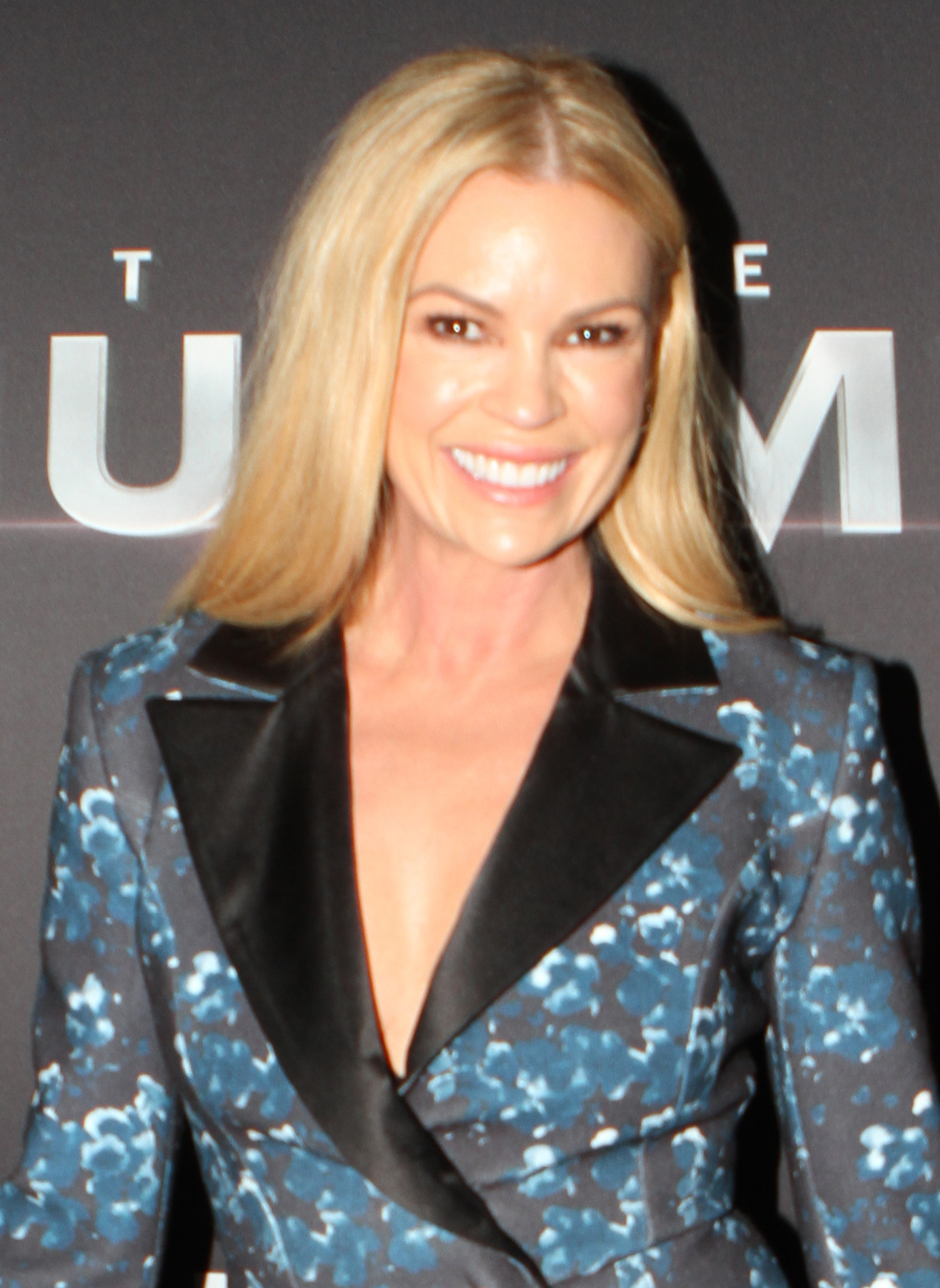
Sonia Kruger (2015–2019, 2021–)

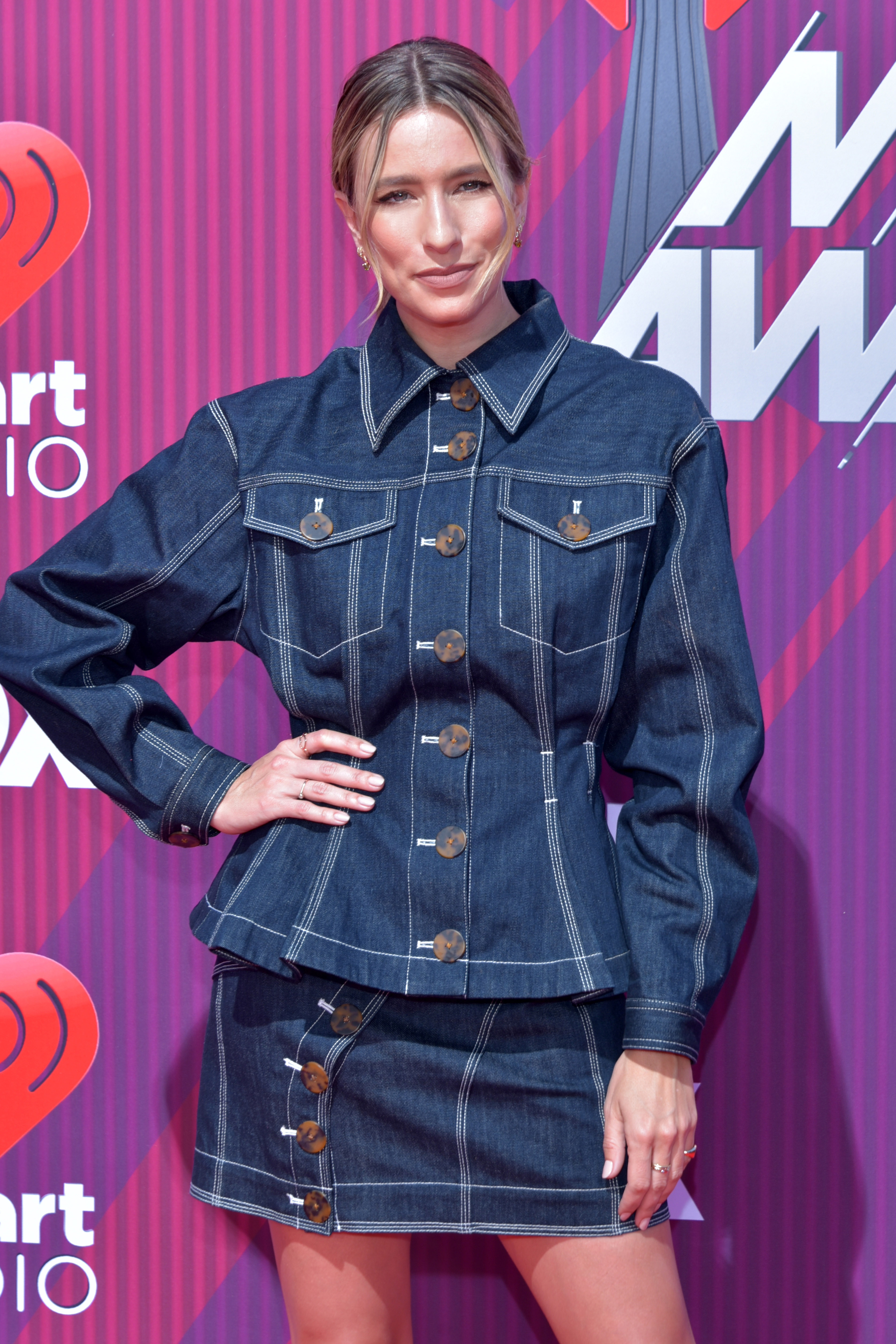
Renee Bargh (2020)

==== Key ====
Main presenter
Backstage presenter

Timeline of hosts
Host	Seasons														
Host	1	2	3	4	5	6	7	8	9	10	11	12	13	14	15
Darren McMullen															
Faustina Agolley															
Sonia Kruger															
Renee Bargh															

== Coaches' teams ==
Winning coach; winners are denoted by boldface.

† Contestant is deceased

Season	Team Seal	Team Joel	Team Delta	Team Keith
1	**Karise Eden**; Fatai V Chris Sebastian; Emma-Louise Birdsall; Sam Ludeman; Michael Duchesne	Sarah De Bono; Ben Hazlewood; Prinnie Stevens; Lakyn Heperi; Laura Bunting	Rachael Leahcar; Glenn Cunningham; Danni Da Ros; Viktoria Bolonina; Matt Hetherington; Ben Bennett	Darren Percival; Diana Rouvas; Adam Martin; Brittany Cairns; Taga Paa; Jimmy Cupples
2	Team Seal	Team Joel	Team Delta	Team Ricky
2	**Harrison Craig**; Mitchell Anderson; Alex Gibson; Jac Stone	Danny Ross; Kiyomi Vella; Michael Stangel; Michael Paynter	Celia Pavey; Steve Clisby; Jackie Sannia; Tim Morrison	Luke Kennedy; Miss Murphy; Simon Meli; Caterina Torres
3	Team Will	Team Kylie	Team Joel	Team Ricky
3	**Anja Nissen**; ZK; Gabriel and Cecilia; Mat Verevis	Johnny Rollins; Kat Jade; Robbie Balmer; John Lingard	Frank Lakoudis; Holly Tapp; Isaac McGovern; Taila Gouge	Jackson Thomas; Sabrina Batshon; Elly Oh; C Major
4	Team Ricky	Team Jessie	Team Delta	Team Madden
4	Liam Maihi; Naomi Price; Gail Page; Scott Newnham	**Ellie Drennan**; Simi Vuata; Amber Nichols; Cath Adams	Lyndall Wennekes; Caleb Jago-Ward; Rik-E-Ragga; Nicholas Duquemin	Joe Moore; Nathan Hawes; Peta Evans-Taylor; Tameaka Powell
5	Team Ronan	Team Jessie	Team Delta	Team Madden
5	Tash Lockhart; Mitch Gardner; Georgia Wiggins; Emad Younan	Ellen Reed; Jack Pellow; Mikaela Dean; Brianna Holm	**Alfie Arcuri**; Adam Ladell; Kim Sheehy; Elle Murphy	Andrew Loadsman; Aaliyah Warren; Lane Sinclair; Lexi Clark
6	Team Seal	Team Delta	Team Kelly	Team George
6	Lucy Sugerman; Berni Harrison; Rennie Adams	**Judah Kelly**; Claire Howell; Tim Conlon	Fasika Ayallew; Spencer Jones; Bojesse Pigram	Hoseah Partsch; Sarah Stone; Robin Johnson
7	Team George	Team Kelly	Team Delta	Team Joe
7	Sheldon Riley; Chang Po Ching; Luke Antony; Mikayla Jade	**Sam Perry**; Bella Paige; AP D'Antonio; Brock Ashby	Ben Clark; Trent Bell; Jacinta Gulisano; Nathan Brake	Aydan Calafiore; Sally Skelton; Ben Sekali; Homegrown
8	Team Kelly	Team Guy	Team Delta	Team George
8	Zeek Power; Lara Dabbagh; Denzel; Rebecca Selley	Jack Vidgen; Mitch Paulsen; Chynna Taylor; Elsa Clement	Daniel Shaw; Jordan Anthony; Sheldon Riley; Natasha Stuart †	**Diana Rouvas**; Lee Harding; Madi Krstevski; Carlos C Major
9	Team Guy	Team Delta	Team George	Team Kelly
9	Johnny Manuel; Timothy Bowen; Adam Ludewig; Stephanie Cole; Matt Gresham	Stellar Perry; Jesse Teinaki; Clarisa Spata; Steve Clisby; Goldi	Siala Robson; Masha Mnjoyan; Angela Fabian; Virginia Lillye †; Elyse Sene-Lefao	**Chris Sebastian**; Mark Furze; Alex Weybury; Despina Savva; Lyric McFarland
10	Team Keith	Team Rita	Team Jess	Team Guy
10	Arlo Sim; Lau Abend; Cassie McIvor; Jediael; Lozz Benson	G-Nat!on; Sian Fuller; Sofia Watt; Tanya George; Halimah Kyrgios	Mick Harrington; Ella Monnery; Seann Miley Moore; Evile Jireh Sisifo Laloata; Janaki Easwar	**Bella Taylor Smith**; Jordan Fuller; Chantel Cofie; Adrian Hood; Penelope Pettigrew
11	Team Keith	Team Jess	Team Rita	Team Guy
11	Thando Sikwila; Lane Pittman; Chriddy Black; Melanie Cowmeadow; Freddie Bailey; Shaun Wessel	Faith Sosene; Jael Wena; Kaylee Bell; Finnian Johnson; Richard Tunami; Emily-Jane Conidi	**Lachie Gill**; Xanthe Campbell; Theoni Marks; Ella & Sienna; Robbie Dolan; Liam Keates-Ryley	Jordan Tavita; Cassidy Mackie; Emerson Alexander; Celestial Utai; Liam Conroy; Jas Winter
12	Team Guy	Team Jess	Team Jason	Team Rita
12	Charlie Pittman; Bella Mackenzie; Elly Poletti; Jaydean Miranda; Marley Sola; Robbie Hunt	Ezra Williams; David Aumua; Shyjana; Dillon Rhodes; Giaan Jordan; Jade Taunton	Ethan Beckton; Callum Warrender; Alex Jeans; Andrew Taylor Knight; Calista Nelmes; Etienne Steven; Maree Mamalis	**Tarryn Stokes**; Emily Kate; Nyree Huyser; Gezel Bardossi; Levi X Elsa Marilyn
13	Team Guy	Team LeAnn	Team Kate	Team Adam
13	SKŸE; Jaydin Shingleton; Roland Williams; Beau Shearer; James Vass; Priscilla Stanley; Shannen Wick	**Reuben De Melo**; Letitia Butler; Brad & Tori; Amber Sindoni; Cookie Robinson; Duncan Toombs; Laura Glynn	Jaedyn Randell; Tom Leeming; Jaymee Lancaster; Elias Lanyon; Michael & Violeta; Nethra Raman; Yorke Heath	Annie Jones; Siena; Arthur Hull; Chloe Kay; Cody Gunton; Lana Sayah; Stephanie Milostic
14	Team Kate	Team Ronan	Team Richard	Team Melanie C
14	**Alyssa Delpopolo**; Sienna Langenheim; Charlie O'Derry; James Van Cooper; Jayd Luna; Amber Scates	Cle Morgan; Ellaphon Ta; Mitchell Dormer; Milly Monk; Hunter Black; Tiffney Reynolds	Bella Parnell; Joseph Vuicakau; Rose Carleo; Chris Cobb; Bianka Jakoveljevic; Jakamo Sharpe	Cassie Henderson; Euan Hart; Gemma Hollingsworth; Callan James; Meg Drummond; Matthias Gault; Lilli Vitagliano
15	Team Ronan	Team Melanie C	Team Kate	Team Richard
15	The 60 Four; Leyla Sabo; Jamie Koul; Phoebe Rose	**Yung Milla**; Taylor Beadle-Williams; Jack Hughes; Cleo Paladino	Daisha Auda; Charlotte June; Bertie Anderson; Victoria Knight	Tommy Novak; Tika Cetinich; Wave Raiders

== Series overview ==
Warning: the following table presents a significant amount of different colours.

Teams color key
Artist from Team Seal	Artist from Team Madden	Artist from Team Jason
Artist from Team Keith	Artist from Team Ronan	Artist from Team LeAnn
Artist from Team Delta	Artist from Team George	Artist from Team Adam
Artist from Team Joel	Artist from Team Kelly	Artist from Team Kate
Artist from Team Ricky	Artist from Team Joe	Artist from Team Melanie C
Artist from Team Will	Artist from Team Guy	Artist from Team Richard
Artist from Team Kylie	Artist from Team Rita
Artist from Team Jessie	Artist from Team Jess

The Voice series overview
Season	Aired in	Winner	Other finalists				Winning coach	Host(s)
1	2012	Karise Eden	Darren Percival	Rachael Leahcar	Sarah De Bono	—N/a	Seal	Darren McMullen
2	2013	Harrison Craig	Luke Kennedy	Celia Pavey	Danny Ross	—N/a	Seal	Darren McMullen
3	2014	Anja Nissen	Jackson Thomas	Johnny Rollins	Frank Lakoudis	ZK	will.i.am	Darren McMullen
4	2015	Ellie Drennan	Joe Moore	Nathan Hawes	Liam Maihi	—N/a	Jessie J	McMullen, Sonia Kruger
5	2016	Alfie Arcuri	Adam Ladell	Tash Lockhart	Ellen Reed	—N/a	Delta Goodrem	Sonia Kruger
6	2017	Judah Kelly	Hoseah Partsch	Lucy Sugerman	Fasika Ayallew	—N/a	Delta Goodrem	Sonia Kruger
7	2018	Sam Perry	Bella Paige	Sheldon Riley	Aydan Calafiore	—N/a	Kelly Rowland	Sonia Kruger
8	2019	Diana Rouvas	Daniel Shaw	Zeek Power	Jordan Anthony	—N/a	Boy George	Sonia Kruger
9*	2020	Chris Sebastian	Siala Robson	Johnny Manuel	Stellar Perry	—N/a	Kelly Rowland	McMullen, Renee Bargh
10	2021	Bella Taylor Smith	Arlo Sim	G-Nat!on	Mick Harrington	—N/a	Guy Sebastian	Sonia Kruger
11	2022	Lachie Gill	Faith Sosene	Jordan Tavita	Thando Sikwila	—N/a	Rita Ora	Sonia Kruger
12	2023	Tarryn Stokes	Ezra Williams	Charlie Pittman	Ethan Beckton	—N/a	Rita Ora	Sonia Kruger
13	2024	Reuben De Melo	Jaedyn Randell	SKŸE	Annie Jones	—N/a	LeAnn Rimes	Sonia Kruger
14	2025	Alyssa Delpopolo	Bella Parnell	Cassie Henderson	Cle Morgan	—N/a	Kate Miller-Heidke	Sonia Kruger
15	2026	Yung Milla	Daisha Auda	Tommy Novak	The 60 Four	—N/a	Melanie C	Sonia Kruger

- Starting in season 9, the three contestants who did not win are all listed as "finalists". Seasons 1 through 8 had runner-up, third, and fourth place finishers.

== Seasons synopsis ==
=== Season 1 (2012) ===
Karise Eden was crowned the first winner of The Voice Australia. Darren Percival was runner-up, followed by Rachael Leahcar in third place and Sarah De Bono in fourth place. Season one saw 80% of artists enter the music charts, culminating in 9 out of the top 10 in finale week. Eden made history with eight singles in the charts and both a number-one single and album.

=== Season 2 (2013) ===
The second season of The Voice Australia crowned Harrison Craig the winner, under Seal's tutelage. Keith Urban did not return as a coach after it was officially announced he would become a judge on American Idol. The Nine Network confirmed on 29 November 2012 that Latin pop star Ricky Martin would replace Urban as the new coach. Luke Kennedy runner-up under the new coach, with Celia Pavey third and Danny Ross fourth.

=== Season 3 (2014) ===
On 26 November 2013, it was announced that Seal and Delta Goodrem would not be returning as coaches for the third season. The same day, it was announced that The Voice UK coaches will.i.am and Kylie Minogue would join Joel Madden and Ricky Martin. Taping for the third season began on 14 January 2014, with the Battle rounds commencing in March. Blind auditions began airing on 4 May 2014. Anja Nissen of Team Will was announced the winner with Jackson Thomas runner-up, Johnny Rollins in third, and Frank Lakoudis and ZK in fourth.

=== Season 4 (2015) ===
In January 2015, it was confirmed that Goodrem would return to her judges chair, and would be joined by former The Voice UK coach Jessie J and Benji Madden. On 22 February 2015, Sonia Kruger was announced as the new co-host. Ellie Drennan of Team Jessie was announced the winner with Joe Moore runner-up, Nathan Hawes in third, and Liam Maihi in fourth.

=== Season 5 (2016) ===
In July 2015, it was confirmed that The Voice would return in 2016. Jessie J, Goodrem and The Madden Brothers were announced as returning coaches; Martin was replaced by Ronan Keating. McMullen announced he would not be returning as host of The Voice after the first four seasons. The season began airing on 1 May 2016. Alfie Arcuri of Team Delta was announced the winner with Adam Ladell runner-up, Tash Lockhart in third, and Ellen Reed in fourth.

=== Season 6 (2017) ===
In November 2016, it was confirmed that Goodrem would be returning as a coach on the show for her fifth season and that she would be joined by former coach, Seal, returning after a three-season absence. The following month, former The Voice UK coach, Boy George, was announced as the third coach. In December 2016, it was confirmed that former The X Factor UK judge and singer, Kelly Rowland, would be the fourth and final coach. The season began airing on 24 April 2017. Judah Kelly of Team Delta was announced the winner with Hoseah Partsch runner-up, Lucy Sugerman in third, and Fasika Ayallew in fourth.

=== Season 7 (2018) ===
On 11 October 2017, the series was renewed for a seventh season and it was announced that Goodrem, George and Rowland would all return. On 14 December 2017, Nine announced Joe Jonas would replace Seal as the new judge for the seventh season. The season began airing on 15 April 2018. Sam Perry of Team Kelly was announced as the winner with The Voice Kids contestants Bella Paige runner-up Sheldon Riley in third, and Aydan Calafiore in fourth.

=== Season 8 (2019) ===
On 17 October 2018, the series was renewed for an eighth season and it was announced that Goodrem, George and Rowland would all return. On 14 November 2018, Nine announced Guy Sebastian would replace Jonas as the second judge for the eighth season. The season began airing on 19 May 2019.

This season, only the Semifinals and the Grand Finale were broadcast live. Each coach was allowed to advance a top four to the Finals: Diana Rouvas of Team George was announced as the winner with Daniel Shaw runner-up, Zeek Power in third, and Jordan Anthony in fourth.

=== Season 9 (2020) ===
On 16 October 2019, the series was renewed for a ninth season with coaches from the previous season returning. On 25 January 2020, it was announced that Darren McMullen and Renee Bargh would act as successors to Kruger as hosts. The block was also introduced as a twist for the blind auditions, giving coaches the power to block another coach from getting an artist. Chris Sebastian of Team Kelly was announced as the winner of the season.

=== Season 10 (2021) ===
In August 2020, it was announced Seven Network had picked up the series for its tenth season, set to broadcast in 2021, with Sonia Kruger returning as host. In December of the same year, Seven announced that Guy Sebastian, Keith Urban, Rita Ora, and Jessica Mauboy were the coaches, replacing Kelly Rowland, Delta Goodrem and Boy George. The grand finale was prerecorded in April 2021, with four different endings being taped. The show was broadcast on 12 September 2021 with the winner, Bella Taylor Smith of Team Guy, being decided by a viewer poll.

=== Season 11 (2022) ===
In October 2021, it was announced that Keith Urban, Jessica Mauboy, Rita Ora, and Guy Sebastian would all return as coaches for the eleventh series. Sonia Kruger returns as host. Some changes to the format were also introduced, The blinds rules changed, with each coach having 12 spots, replacing the previous unlimited spots rule. This season also introduces the Battle Pass. Coaches will have a new button, in addition to the main button and the block buttons. The Battle Pass allows a coach to automatically send the contestant to the battles. Each coach could only press the button for one artist in the entire blinds. The Cut was scrapped and replaced by the 'Callbacks' in which each coach has to cut their team down from 12 to 6. The battle rounds also returned; coaches are to cut their team from 6 to 3 by pairing two of their artists to sing the same song as a duet. Then the coaches must pick two out of their 3 winners to advance to the semi-finals. From the semi-finals, each coach must choose one artist to advance to the pre-recorded finale. Similar to last season, the winner was determined by a viewer poll, with Lachie Gill of Team Rita being declared the winner.

=== Season 12 (2023) ===
In March 2023, it was announced that Guy Sebastian, Rita Ora, and Jessica Mauboy would all return as coaches for the twelfth series. Meanwhile, Keith Urban was replaced by Jason Derulo. Sonia Kruger returns as host. This season axed the Battle Pass, which was introduced in the previous season. Also, this season the coaches were allowed to block before a coach turns their chair, which prevented the blocked coach's chair from facing the artist if they pressed their button. Similar to the previous two seasons, the winner was determined by a viewer poll, with Tarryn Stokes of Team Rita being declared the winner.

=== Season 13 (2024) ===
In February 2024, it was announced that Guy Sebastian would return as a coach for the thirteenth series. Meanwhile, Rita Ora, Jessica Mauboy, and Jason Derulo were replaced by LeAnn Rimes, Kate Miller-Heidke, and Adam Lambert. Sonia Kruger returned as host. A new twist in the blind auditions occurred this season with the Ultimate Block. The feature blocks all other turned coaches, defaulting the artist to the blocker's team. Similar to the previous three seasons, the winner was determined by a viewer poll, with Reuben De Melo of Team LeAnn being declared the winner.

=== Season 14 (2025) ===
In January 2025, Channel 7 announced the judging panel for the fourteenth season, which Sky News Australia described as a "mass red chair exodus". Miller-Heidke was announced to return for her second consecutive season, and Keating was announced to return after a nine-year hiatus, replacing Lambert. Former The Voice Kids UK coach Melanie C and Richard Marx were announced as new coaches, following the departures of Rimes and Sebastian. Kruger returned as host. Similar to the previous four seasons, the winner was determined by a viewer poll, with Alyssa Delpopolo of Team Kate being declared the winner.

=== Season 15 (2026) ===
In October 2025, the series was renewed for a fifteenth season with Miller-Heidke, Keating, Marx, and Melanie C returning as coaches from the previous season. This is the third time in the history of the show, after the ninth and eleventh seasons, that all coaches from the previous season returned for the following season. On 8 June 2026, it was announced that Tones and I will debut as a fifth coach, being the first time in the show's history that there were more than four coaches. However, Tones was not featured as a main coach. She instead acted as a secret backstage coach operating entirely from a private, off-stage studio, where she gathers eliminated artists from the blind auditions of her choice to mentor on her team with some new songs before sending them back out for another blind audition. Similar to the previous five seasons, the winner was determined by a viewer poll, with Yung Milla of Team Melanie C being declared the winner.

== Spin-offs ==
=== The Voice Generations ===
On 16 July 2021, The Voice casting website announced the application for a new version of the show to be broadcast in 2022: The Voice: Generations, where family or friend groups consisting in singers of all ages are the ones who can apply. This is an original version of The Voice franchise, with the idea being adapted to the Lithuanian series a few weeks later. The first season is hosted by Sonia Kruger and has Jessica Mauboy, Rita Ora, Guy Sebastian and Keith Urban as coaches.

== Music releases by contestants ==
Two The Voice Australia winners, Karise Eden and Harrison Craig's, albums have debuted at number one on the ARIA albums chart. Besides both winners, Darren Percival, Rachael Leahcar, Sarah De Bono, Prinnie Stevens, Emma Birdsall, Adam Martin and Lakyn of season 1, and Luke Kennedy, Emma Pask, Danny Ross, Ms. Murphy and Caterina Torres of season 2 have all signed record contracts with Universal Music Australia.

Possibly the most notable alumni of the series is season 2 finalist Celia Pavey, who has achieved a successful pop career in Australia under the name Vera Blue. Her single "Papercuts" with rapper Illy peaked at #2 on the ARIA singles chart, and her second album Perennial debuted on the ARIA albums chart at #6. Eleven of her singles have achieved either Gold or Platinum status in the country.

Another notable alumni is season 4 contestant Grace Pitts, who has had a successful career under the name GRAACE, receiving significant airplay on Triple J.

== Reception ==
=== Viewership ===
Season	Premiere date	Finale date	Episodes	Premiere ratings	Rank	Finale ratings (Grand final)	Rank	Finale ratings (Winner announced)	Rank	Average series viewers	Average rank	Source
1	15 April 2012	18 June 2012	16	2.190	#1	2.749	#2	3.238	#1	2.375	#1	
2	7 April 2013	17 June 2013	24	1.940	#1	2.093	#2	2.380	#1	1.989	#1	
3	4 May 2014	21 July 2014	23	2.229	#1	1.727	#1	1.579	#2	1.741	#1	
4	28 June 2015	30 August 2015	18	1.633	#1	1.563	#2	1.666	#1	1.574	#1	
5	1 May 2016	10 July 2016	18	1.454	#1	1.207	#4	1.331	#1	1.280	#2	
6	24 April 2017	2 July 2017	20	1.277	#1	1.231	#4	1.357	#1	1.140	#3	
7	15 April 2018	17 June 2018	20	1.072	#5	1.028	#4	1.086	#3	0.987	#4	
8	19 May 2019	7 July 2019	20	1.064	#3	1.019	#4	1.069	#2	1.030	#3	
9	24 May 2020	19 July 2020	21	1.082	#3	0.938	#5	—N/a		0.938	#6	
10	8 August 2021	12 September 2021	13	1.329	#2	1.292	#2	1.383	#1	1.285	#1	
11 (Note: Ratings data used for this season from OzTAM represents total viewership of the 5 largest Australian metropolitan centres (Sydney, Melbourne, Brisbane, Perth and Adelaide), regional and National.)	18 April 2022	29 May 2022	14	1.532	#5	1.388	#4	1.390	#3	1.388	#5	
12	6 August 2023	8 October 2023	17	1.338	#3	1.324	#3	1.348	#2	1.281	#3	
13 (Note: Ratings data used for this season from OzTAM represents National total viewership.)	19 August 2024	27 October 2024	17	0.977	#4	1.081	#2	—		0.983	#4	
14	10 August 2025	2 November 2025	17	0.984	#4	0.842	#2	—		0.912	#4	
15	2 August 2026	27 September 2026	17	1.102	#2	1.227	#3	—		1.006	#4	

=== Awards and nominations ===
Awards and nominations received by The Voice
Year	Award	Category	Nominee	Result	Ref
2013	AACTA Awards	Best Reality Television Series	The Voice	Nominated	
2013	Logie Awards	Most Popular Light Entertainment Program	The Voice	Won	
2013	Logie Awards	Most Popular New Male Talent	Joel Madden	Won	
2013	Logie Awards	Most Outstanding Light Entertainment Program	The Voice	Nominated	
2014	Logie Awards	Most Popular Light Entertainment Program	The Voice	Nominated	
2014	Logie Awards	Most Outstanding Light Entertainment Program	The Voice	Nominated	
2015	AACTA Awards	Best Reality Television Series	The Voice	Won	
2015	Logie Awards	Most Popular Entertainment Program	The Voice	Nominated	
2015	Logie Awards	Most Outstanding Entertainment Program	The Voice	Won	
2015	AACTA Awards	Best Reality TV	The Voice	Nominated	
2016	Logie Awards	Best Entertainment Program	The Voice	Nominated	
2016	Logie Awards	Most Outstanding Entertainment Program	The Voice	Nominated	
2017	Logie Awards	Best Entertainment Program	The Voice	Nominated	
2017	Logie Awards	Most Outstanding Entertainment Program	The Voice	Nominated	
2019	Logie Awards	Most Popular Entertainment Program	The Voice	Nominated	
2019	Logie Awards	Most Popular New Talent	Joe Jonas	Nominated	
2023	Logie Awards	Most Popular Entertainment Program	The Voice	Nominated	

== See also ==
- List of Australian music television shows
- The Voice (franchise)
- List of Australian television series
- List of programs broadcast by Nine Network
- List of programs broadcast by Seven Network
