= Danny Ross (musician) =

Australian musician (born 1983)

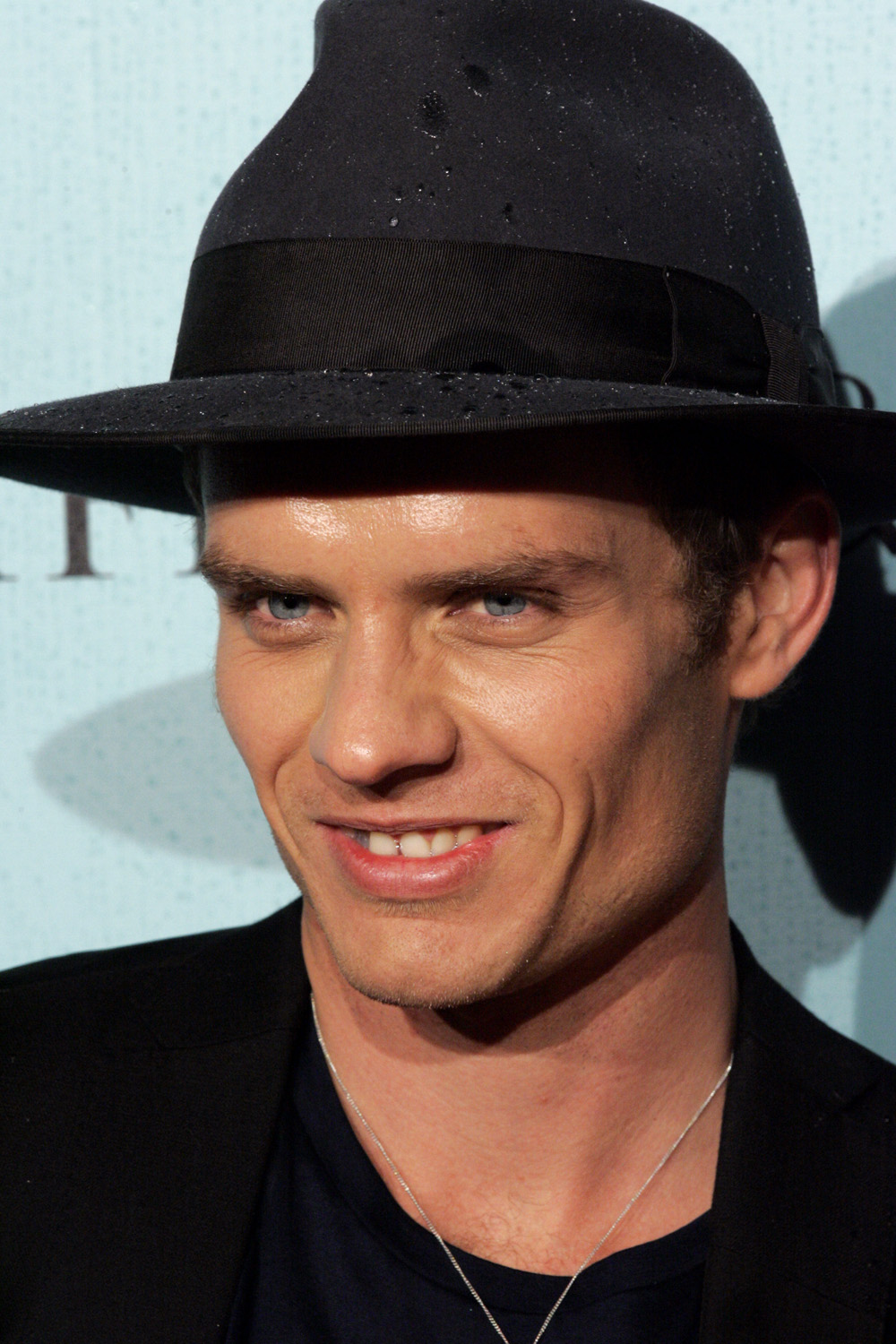

Background information
- Born: Danny Philip Ross; 4 November 1983 (age 43)
- Origin: Byron Bay New South Wales, Australia
- Genres: Folk, blues, Progressive rock
- Occupations: Musician, singer-songwriter
- Instruments: Vocals, guitar
- Label: Unsigned
- Partner: Lisa Mitchell

Danny Philip Ross (born 4 November 1983) is an Australian singer, songwriter and guitarist based in the City of Darebin, Victoria.

Ross is best known as a 2013 finalist on The Voice Australia, and is a regular performer at musical festivals and live venues in Australia. Ross has described the death of his father, who was a farmer but loved singing-songwriting, as the inspiration for him focusing on a career in music, Ross was coached by Joel Madden of Good Charlotte fame. He is an accomplished guitarist and demonstrated guitars for Jacksons Rare Guitars.

Ross' debut album, As the Crow Flies, was released on 12 July 2013. The album debuted and peaked at number 61 on the ARIA charts.

== Discography ==
=== Albums ===
Title	Details	Peak chart positions
Title	Details	AUS
As the Crow Flies	Release date: 12 July 2013; Label: Universal Music Australia (3743764); Formats: CD	61

=== Charting singles ===
Title	Year	Peak chart positions
Title	Year	AUS
"Old Man"	2013	33
