= Fatai (singer) =

Australian singer (born 1995)

Fatai Fatai Veamatahau
- Born: 4 June 1995 (age 31); Melbourne, Australia
- Genres: Indie, Urban
- Instruments: Vocals, piano, guitar
- Years active: 2009–present
- Label: Past – Mercury Records Australia. Current – Independent
- Website: facebook.com/FataiMusic

Fatai (born Fatai Veamatahau on 4 June 1995) is a Melbourne, Australia-based singer of Tongan descent. She rose to fame soon after being a semi-finalist on the first season of the Australian version of The Voice. Following her success on The Voice, she signed a deal with Mercury Records Australia. In mid-2015, following two and a half years on the Mercury label, Fatai became an independent artist. Her debut single as an independent artist, "Purple", was released on 16 August 2015, soon followed by her live debut EP, Undone, on 20 November 2015.

== History ==
=== Early life and career ===
Fatai began singing professionally with her family from the age of seven. In 2009, she began a solo career, singing to audiences at various festivals and community events.

=== 2012: The Voice ===
==== Performances ====
Performed	Song	Original artist	Result
Blind Audition	"Songbird"	Fleetwood Mac	Defaulted Team Seal
Battle Rounds	"Love the Way You Lie (Part II)" (against Mitchell Thompson)	Rihanna & Eminem	Winner
Live Show Final, Part 1	"Empire State of Mind (Part II) Broken Down"	Alicia Keys	Seal's Choice
Live Show Final, Part 3	"Ave Maria"	Beyoncé	Seal's Choice
Live Show Final, Part 3	"Kiss From a Rose" (as part of Team Seal)	Seal	Seal's Choice
Live Show Final, Part 5	"On the Radio"	Donna Summer	Eliminated

=== 2013–present: Post The Voice ===
Fatai sold out her own first headline tour spanning Australia and New Zealand in 2014.

In 2014, her videos covering Disney's Frozen's "Do You Want to Build a Snowman?" found its way to an online audience of many millions of people globally on Facebook and YouTube. Soon after, Fatai was requested to record a studio version of "Do You Want To Build A Snowman?", which was released as the lead single on Universal Music Australia's Christmas compilation album We Love Disney, in November 2014.

In 2015, Fatai supplied backing vocals on Guy Sebastian's "Tonight Again" and was the support act for Sebastian's 2015 arena tour.

Fatai released her debut EP, Undone, on 20 November 2015.

In 2016, Fatai was invited to be a part of Willow Creek Community Church in Chicago. While being based out of Chicago, she toured in North America for the first time, selling out two shows at Hotel Café in Los Angeles, two shows at Rockwood Music Hall Stage 2 in New York City and Schubas in Chicago.

== Discography ==
=== Extended plays ===
Title	EP details
Undone	Released: 2015; Label: Fatai; Format: digital download, streaming

=== Singles ===
Year	Singles	Peak positions
Year	Singles	AUS
2012	"Songbird"	168
2012	"Love The Way You Lie"	32
2012	"Empire State of Mind (Part 2)"	43
2012	"Ave Maria"	25
2013	"Silent Night"	–
2015	"Purple"	–
