= Fatai Onikeke =

Nigerian–Australian boxer (born 1983)

Personal information
- Nickname: Kid Dynamite
- Nationality: Nigerian/Australian
- Born: Fatai Onikeke Isiaka; 2 April 1983 (age 43) Nigeria
- Weight: light welter/welterweight

Boxing career

Boxing record
- Total fights: 27
- Wins: 23 (KO 20)
- Losses: 4 (KO 2)

Fatai "Kid Dynamite" Onikeke (born 2 April 1983) is a Nigerian/Australian professional light welter/welterweight boxer of the 2000s and 2010s who won the Nigerian welterweight title, African Boxing Union (ABU) welterweight title, World Boxing Foundation (WBFo) Intercontinental light welterweight title, International Boxing Federation (IBF) Pan Pacific light welterweight title, and Commonwealth welterweight title, and was a challenger for the World Boxing Organization (WBO) Africa light welterweight title, WBFo light welterweight title, and World Boxing Organization (WBO) Oriental light welterweight title against Lance Gostelow , his professional fighting weight varied from 138 1/2 lb (62.8 kg; 9 st 12.5 lb), i.e. light welterweight to 146 1/2 lb (66.5 kg; 10 st 6.5 lb), i.e. welterweight.

== Professional boxing record ==
Onikeke lost to Ganoy via 7th round TKO last 2006.
