= Fatai Ayinla Aileru =

Nigerian politician (born 1938)

Coordinates: 6°32′N 3°21′E

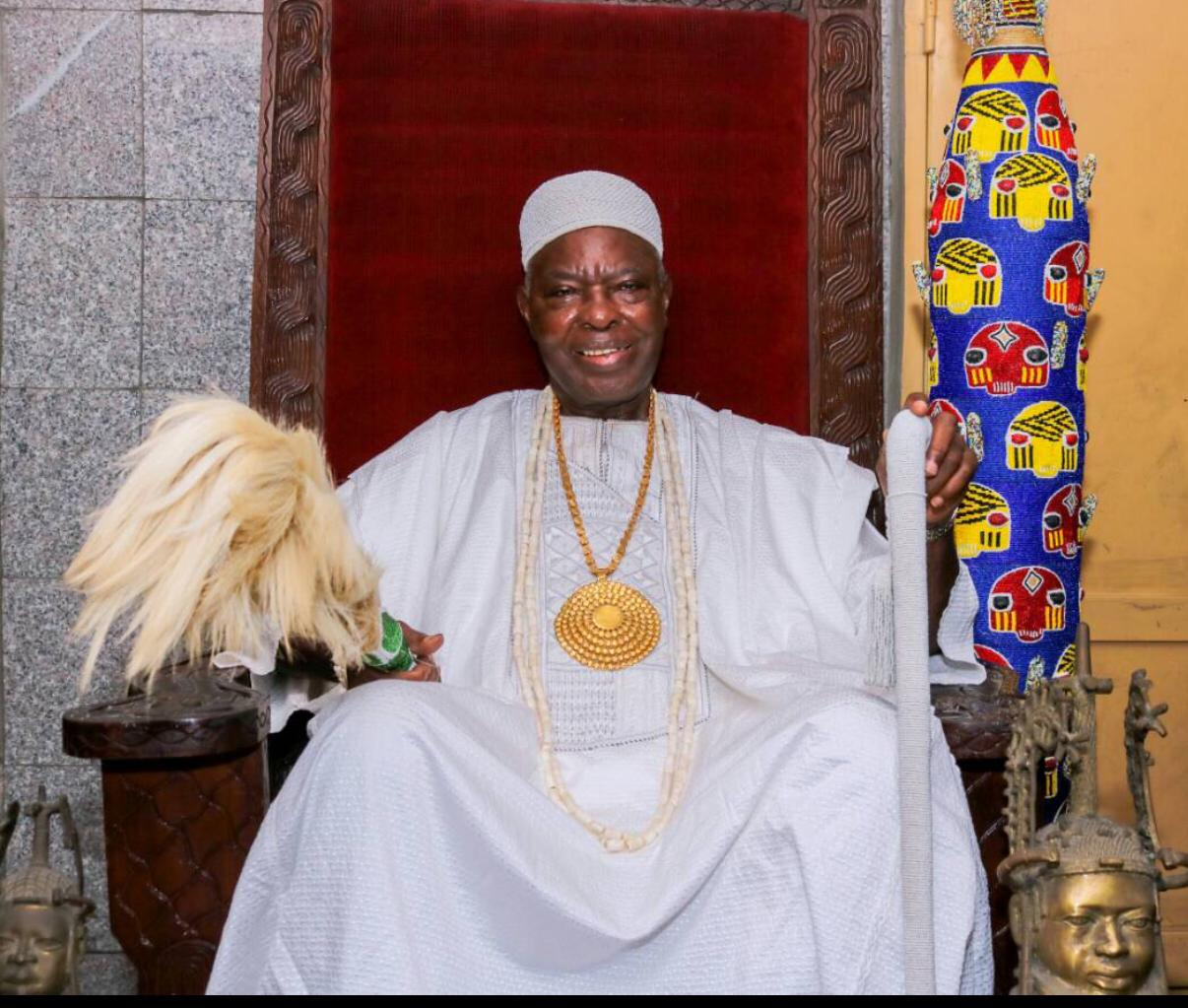
OBA FATAI AYINLA AILERU OLUMUSHIN OF MUSHINLAND

Oba Fatai Ayinla Aileru was born on March 11, 1938 and serves as the traditional ruler of Mushinland, as well as the Chairman of the Council of Obas and Chiefs in Mushin Local Government Area. Holding the title of a First-Class Oba, he is also a Permanent Member of the Lagos State Council of Obas in Nigeria. The Lagos State Council of Obas and Chiefs plays an essential role in governance, offering guidance to the government, mobilizing community support for policies, and serving as a link between the authorities and local communities.

The Lagos State Council of Obas and Chiefs was established alongside the creation of Lagos State itself. It was officially formed under the Lagos State Council of Obas and Chiefs Edict of 1969, which took effect in April of that year. Initially, in December 1995, the council had thirty-one members but was later dissolved by the outgoing State Executive Council at its 11th session on May 28, 2007. A new council was subsequently reconstituted, comprising fifty-one members from the divisions of Lagos Island, Ikeja, Epe, Ikorodu, and Badagry.

== Early life and career ==
Fatai Ayinla Aileru was born on March 11, 1938, to Oba (King) Jimoh Gbadamosi Aileru and Olori (Queen) Elizabeth Alake as their first child. He began his early education at Christian Public School in Mushin before continuing to Metropolitan College in Surulere for his secondary schooling. Upon completing his studies, he worked as a cashier at Pan African Metals (NIG) Ltd, located on Ikorodu Road in Yaba. Driven by a keen interest in public service, he joined the Mushin District Council in 1955, which later became Mushin Local Government in 1964. In 1977, he was appointed as the rightful heir to the Mushinland throne, following his ancestral lineage. Oba Fatai Ayinla Aileru II (JP) has traveled extensively. He is widely recognized for his philanthropic efforts and passion for sports. In recognition of his contributions to community development, a street in a market was renamed in his honor as "Oba Fatai Ayinla Aileru Street" in 1989.
