= List of nicknames used in cricket =

Cricket has a rich tradition of using nicknames. This is a list of nicknames used in international cricket.

== National teams ==
Nation	Team	Nickname	Context
Australia	Men's & Women's	Baggy Greens	The 'baggy green' is a Myrtle green cap worn by Australian test cricketers.
Australia	Women's	Southern Stars	The team was formerly known as the Southern Stars. In 2017, Cricket Australia overhauled its approach to the women's game, dropping the team title to bring the team at par with the nickname-less men's side.
Australia	1948 Men's team in England	The Invincibles	Regarded as one of the greatest cricket team of all time, the team earned the sobriquet as it toured England unbeaten.
Bangladesh	Men's	Tigers	The royal Bengal tiger is Bangladesh's national animal.
Bangladesh	Women's	Tigresses	The royal Bengal tiger is Bangladesh's national animal.
England	Men's	Three Lions	The English football team's nickname is sometimes used for the cricket team, referring to the Three Lions crest of the England and Wales Cricket Board.
India	Men's	Men in Blue	Indian cricket team colours are usually shades of blue.
India	Women's	Women in Blue	Indian cricket team colours are usually shades of blue.
Ireland	Men's	Green and Whites	Irish cricket team colours are usually green and white.
Ireland	Men's	Men in Green	Irish cricket team colours are usually green and white.
Nepal	Men's	Rhinos	The Cricket Association of Nepal has an Indian rhinoceros on its emblem.
Nepal	2018 Men's WCL Div 2 team	Cardiac Kids	The nickname was acquired after the team managed several nail-biting victories.
New Zealand	Men's	Black Caps	Based on the New Zealand rugby union team's All Black nickname, the official nickname was chosen after a 1998 open competition.
New Zealand	Men's	Kiwis	The Kiwi is a bird native to New Zealand.
New Zealand	Women's	White Ferns	The silver fern is New Zealand's national plant.
Pakistan	Men's	Green Shirts	Pakistani cricket team colours are usually green.
Pakistan	Men's	Men in Green	Pakistani cricket team colours are usually green.
Pakistan	Men's	Shaheens	The Shaheen falcon is Pakistan's state bird.
Pakistan	1992 Men's world cup team	Cornered Tigers	The 1992 World Cup champion team was asked to "fight like cornered tigers" by captain Imran Khan. The nickname is now used for the team generally as well.
Scotland	Women's	Wildcats	The Scottish wildcat is a population of European wildcat indigenous to Scotland.
South Africa	Men's	Proteas	Protea is a South African flowering plant.
South Africa	Women's	Proteas	Protea is a South African flowering plant.
Sri Lanka	Men's	Lions	Sri Lanka Cricket has a lion on its emblem.
West Indies	Men's	The Windies	A colloquial term for the West Indies cricket team, it was officially adopted as a nickname in 2017.
West Indies	Women's	The Windies	A colloquial term for the West Indies cricket team, it was officially adopted as a nickname in 2017.
West Indies	1970-90s Men's	The Mighty West Indies	The 1975 and 1979 world cup champions were famous for their continued domination of international cricket until the 1990s.
Zimbabwe	Men's	Chevrons	Initially used by Masvingo cricket team, the nickname was eventually picked up by the national side.

== Officials, umpires and commentators ==
- Jonathan Agnew – Spiro, Aggers
- Harold Bird – Dickie
- Henry Blofeld – Blowers
- Billy Bowden – Billy
- Steve Bucknor – Slow Death Bucknor
- Bill Frindall – Bearded Wonder, Bearders
- Robin Jackman – Jackers
- Brian Johnston – Johnners
- Mpumelelo Mbangwa – Pommie
- Christopher Martin-Jenkins – CMJ
- Don Mosey – The Alderman
- Ashish Nehra – Nehra Ji
- David Shepherd – Shep
- Alan Wilkins – Wilko

== Supporters ==
- An organised group of Australian cricket team supporters – The Fanatics
- An organised group of English cricket team supporters – Barmy Army
- An organised group of Irish cricket team supporters ― Blarney Army
- An organised group of New Zealand cricket team supporters – The Beige Brigade
- An organised group of Indian cricket team supporters – Bharat Army

== Players ==
The following is arranged by last name.

=== A ===
- Paul Adams – Gogga (Afrikaans nickname, which means 'insect')
- Shahid Afridi – Boom Boom Afridi, Lala
- Ajit Agarkar – Bombay Duck
- Jonathan Agnew – Aggers, Spiro
- Mushtaq Ahmed – Mushie, Jaadugar
- Saeed Ajmal – The Magician, Saeed Bhai
- Shoaib Akhtar – Rawalpindi Express
- Terry Alderman – The Smiling Assassin, Clem (after Clem Jones, alderman and mayor of Brisbane, curator of The Gabba)
- Mohinder Amarnath – Jimmy, Mr. Amarnought
- James Anderson – The Burnley Lara, The Burnley Express
- Warwick Armstrong – Big Ship
- Geoff Arnold – Horse
- Mohammad Ashraful – Matin
- Ravichandran Ashwin – Ash, Anna
- Mike Atherton – Athers, FEC, Cockroach, Dready, Iron Mike

=== B ===
- Trevor Bailey – The Boil, Barnacle
- David Bairstow – Bluey
- Jonny Bairstow – YJB
- Omari Banks – Bankie
- Eddie Barlow – Bunter
- Gareth Batty – Boris, Nora
- Michael Beer – Frothy
- Ian Bell – Belly, The Sherminator
- Richie Benaud – Diamonds
- Travis Birt – Edgar * Ian Bishop – Bish
- Allan Border – AB, Captain Grumpy
- Ian Botham – Beefy, Guy the Gorilla
- Geoffrey Boycott – Fiery, Boycs, Thatch
- Don Bradman – The Don
- Dwayne Bravo – DJ
- Mike Brearley – Brears, Scagg
- Stuart Broad – Westlife
- Katherine Brunt – Brunty, Nunny
- Jasprit Bumrah – Boom
- Ces Burke – Burglar
- Mark Butcher – Butch, Baz

=== C ===
- Andy Caddick – Des, Shack, Wingnut
- Yuzvendra Chahal – Yuzi
- Harry Cave – Caveman
- Shivnarine Chanderpaul – Tiger, Tigerpaul The Chanderwall
- Greg Chappell – Chappello
- Ian Chappell – Chappelli
- Roston Chase – Youngross
- Dan Christian – Dan the Man
- Michael Clarke – Pup, Clarkey
- Herbie Collins – Horseshoe
- Learie Constantine – Electric Heels
- Alastair Cook – Chef, Captain Cook
- Mark Cosgrove – Cossy, Baby-Boof
- Jack Cowie – Bull
- John Crawley – Creepy
- Fen Cresswell – Ferret
- Colin Croft – Bomber
- Kate Cross – Crossy
- Martin Crowe – Hogan
- Pat Cummins – Patto, Cummo

=== D ===
- Nida Dar – Lady Boom Boom
- Ian Davis – Wizard
- A. B. de Villiers – ABD, Mr. 360°
- Phillip DeFreitas – Daffy (named after the Looney Tunes character with the same name)
- Peter Denning – Dasher
- Narsingh Deonarine- Ringo
- Kapil Dev – The Haryana Hurricane
- Ted Dexter – Lord Ted
- Shikhar Dhawan – Gabbar
- M. S. Dhoni – Thala, MSD, Mahi, Captain Cool
- Michael Di Venuto – Diva
- Graham Dilley – Pica, Dill
- Basil D'Oliveira – Dolly, Bas
- Allan Donald – White Lightning
- Martin Donnelly – Squib
- Brett Dorey – Behemoth
- Deandra Dottin – World Boss
- J. W. H. T. Douglas – Johnny Won't Hit Today
- Rahul Dravid – The Wall, Jammy
- Mignon du Preez – Minx
- K. S. Duleepsinhji – Duleep Mr Smith
- Sophia Dunkley – Dunks

=== E ===
- Phil Edmonds – Goat, Henry
- Charlotte Edwards – Lottie, Chief
- Fidel Edwards – Castro
- Matthew Elliott – Herb
- John Emburey – Embers, Ernie, Knuckle
- Farokh Engineer – Rooky, Brylcreem Boy, Dikra Farookh
- Sean Ervine – Slug, Siuc

=== F ===
- Imran Farhat – Romi
- James Faulkner – The Finisher
- Steven Finn – The Watford Wall
- Damien Fleming – Bowlologist
- Andre Fletcher – The Spice Man
- Andrew Flintoff – Freddie
- Graeme Fowler – Foxy
- Peter Fulton – Two-metre Peter

=== G ===
- Gautam Gambhir – Gauti
- Sourav Ganguly – Prince of Kolkata, God of Offside, Dada
- Joel Garner – Big Bird
- Mike Gatting – Fat Gatt
- Chris Gayle – Gayleforce, Gaylestorm, World Boss T20 Boss, Mr. T20, Universe Boss,
- Herschelle Gibbs – Scooter
- Eddie Gilbert – Fast Eddie
- Adam Gilchrist – Gilly, Churchy
- Ashley Giles – Gilo, Skinny, Splash, The King of Spain, Wheelie Bin
- Jason Gillespie – Dizzy
- David Gower – Stoat
- W. G. Grace – W. G., The Doctor (a nickname also used for Dwayne Smith)
- Rebecca Grundy – Grunners, Carol
- Umar Gul – Guldozer
- Asanka Gurusinha – Gura

=== H ===
- Brad Haddin – BJ, Hadds
- Richard Hadlee – Paddles
- Walter Hadlee – Skip
- Mohammad Hafeez – Professor, Professor of Sargodha
- Alex Hales – Baz
- Haseeb Hameed – Baby Boycott
- Steve Harmison – Harmy, GBH (Grievous Bodily Harmison)
- Chris Harris – Lugs
- M J Harris – Pasty
- Ryan Harris – Ryano
- Chris Hartley – Hannibal
- Ian Harvey – Harvs, The Freak
- Shane Harwood – Stickers
- John Hastings – The Duke
- Nathan Hauritz – Ritzy
- Matthew Hayden – Haydos, Big Fish
- Johnny Hayes – Haybags
- Rachael Haynes – Des, Dessie
- George Headley – The Black Bradman
- Alyssa Healy – Midge
- Hunter Hendry – Stork
- Shimron Hetmyer – Hetty
- Ben Hilfenhaus – Hilfy
- Jack Hobbs – The Master
- Brad Hodge – Hodgey, Dodgeball
- Matthew Hoggard – Oggie
- Michael Holding – Whispering Death
- James Hopes – Catfish
- A. N. Hornby – Monkey, The Boss
- Merv Hughes – Fruitfly
- Nasser Hussain – Nashwan
- David Hussey – Huss, Bomber, Junior Mr. Cricket
- Michael Hussey – Mr Cricket, Huss

=== I ===
- Ian Bradshaw – Carrie
- Inzamam-ul-Haq – Inzi
- Ironmonger – Dainty

=== J ===
- Ravindra Jadeja – Jaddu
- Phil Jaques – Pro
- Douglas Jardine – The Iron Duke
- Sanath Jayasuriya – Matara Mauler
- Mahela Jayawardene – Maiya
- Gilbert Jessop – The Croucher
- Mitchell Johnson – Midge, Notch
- Jess Jonassen – JJ
- Ernie Jones – Jonah
- Simon Jones – Horse

=== K ===
- Mohammad Kaif – Kaifu
- Ishan Kishan– Pocket dynamite
- Romesh Kaluwitharana – Little Kalu, Little Dynamite
- Danish Kaneria – Nani-Danny
- Marizanne Kapp – Kappie
- Chamara Kapugedera – Kapu
- Dinesh Karthik – DK
- Michael Kasprowicz – Kasper
- Simon Katich – Kat
- Justin Kemp – Kempie
- Rob Key – Keysy
- Imran Khan – The Lion of Lahore
- Zaheer Khan – Zak
- Usman Khawaja – Uzzie, Captain Grumpy
- Delissa Kimmince – DK
- Michael Klinger – Maxy
- Lance Klusener – Zulu
- Heather Knight – Trev
- Alan Knott – Knotty, Flea
- Virat Kohli – Cheeku, King Kohli
- Bhuvneshwar Kumar – Bhuvi
- Anil Kumble – Apple, Jumbo

=== L ===
- Allan Lamb – Legga, Lambie
- Justin Langer – Alfie, JL
- Meg Lanning – Megastar, Serious Sally
- Brian Lara – The Prince of Port of Spain
- Gavin Larsen – The Postman
- Bill Lawry – Phantom
- Geoff Lawson – Henry
- V. V. S. Laxman – Very Very Special
- Brett Lee – Bing, Binga, The Speedster,
- Darren Lehmann – Boof
- H. D. G. Leveson Gower – Shrimp
- Dennis Lillee – FOT
- Clive Lloyd – Supercat
- David Lloyd – Bumble
- Chris Lynn – Lynnsanity, Bash Brother

=== M ===
- Charles Macartney – Governor-General
- Stuart MacGill – Mac, Magilla
- Ken Mackay – Slasher
- Farveez Maharoof – Fara
- Jimmy Maher – Mahbo
- Sajid Mahmood – Saj, King
- Lasith Malinga – Malinga the Slinga, The Yorker King
- MS Dhoni - Mahi, Captain Cool,^{[255]} Thala,^{[255]}
- Ashley Mallett – Rowdy
- Vic Marks – Skid, Speedy
- Charles Marriott – Father
- Mitchell Marsh – Bison
- Geoff Marsh – Swampy
- Rod Marsh – Iron Gloves, Bacchus
- Shaun Marsh – SOS
- Frederick Martin – Nutty
- Damien Martyn – Marto
- Lloyd Mash – Bangers
- Khaled Mashud – Pilot
- Angelo Mathews – Angie, Superman, Jocka
- Greg Matthews – Mo
- Glenn Maxwell – Big Show, Maxi/Maxy
- Stan McCabe – Napper
- Brendon McCullum – Bash Brother
- Glenn McGrath – Pigeon, Millard
- Graham McKenzie – Garth
- Brian McMillan – Big Mac
- Craig McMillan – Macca
- Colin Miller – Funky
- Keith Miller – Nugget
- Misbah-ul-Haq – Lone warrior, Tuk tuk, Man of Crisis
- Amit Mishra – Mishi
- Dave Mohammed – Tadpole
- Beth Mooney – Moons
- Frank Mooney – Starlight
- Roberta Moretti Avery – Big Mom
- Chris Morris – Tipo
- John Morrison – Mystery
- Mashrafe Mortaza – Norail Express, Koushik
- Muttiah Muralitharan – Murali
- Tim Murtagh – Dial M
- Phil Mustard – Colonel

=== N ===
- Mohammad Nabi – The President
- André Nel – Nella, Gunther
- Mfuneko Ngam – Chew
- Paul Nixon – Badger, Nico
- Monty Noble – Mary Ann
- Ashley Noffke – Noffers
- Marcus North – Snork
- Makhaya Ntini – George, Mdingi Express

=== O ===
- Iain O'Brien – Ober
- Kerry O'Keeffe – Skull
- Chris Old – Chilly
- Bill O'Reilly – Tiger (also used for Shivnarine Chanderpaul)

=== P ===
- Milford Page – Curly
- Shikha Pandey – Shikhipedia
- Monty Panesar – The Mont-ster, Python, The Beard to be Feared, The Sikh of Tweak
- Mansoor Ali Khan Pataudi – Tiger
- Jeetan Patel – Dave *Matheesha Pathirana- Baby Malinga
- Ellyse Perry – Pez
- Glenn Phillips – GP
- Kevin Pietersen – K. P., Kelvin, Kelv, Kapes
- Liam Plunkett – Pudsy
- Pat Pocock – Percy
- Kieron Pollard – Polly
- Peter Pollock – Pooch, The Big Dog
- Shaun Pollock – Polly
- Ricky Ponting – Punter
- Matt Prior – The Cheese

=== R ===
- Geoff Rabone – Bones, Bonsie
- Mustafizur Rahman – Fizz
- Suresh Raina – Mr. IPL, Chinna Thala
- Denesh Ramdin - Shotta
- Mark Ramprakash – Ramps
- Arjuna Ranatunga – Captain Cool
- Derek Randall – Arkle, Rags
- K. S. Ranjitsinhji – Ranji
- Rachin Ravindra – Chinny
- John R. Reid – Bogo
- Matt Renshaw – The Turtle
- Viv Richards – Smokin Joe, Smokey, King Viv, The Emperor, The Master Blaster
- Greg Ritchie – Fat Cat
- Raymond Robertson-Glasgow – Crusoe
- Andre Russell - Dre Russ

=== S ===
- Mitchell Santner – Slink, Flatline
- Megan Schutt – Schutter/Shooter
- Virender Sehwag – Viru, Multan ka Sultan, Nawab of Najafgarh
- Verdun Scott – Scotty
- Mohammad Shahzad – Mahi, M. S., Shazi
- Rohit Sharma – Hit-Man, Shana, 264 (referring to the 264 he made against Sri Lanka)
- Sandeep Sharma – Sandy
- Anya Shrubsole – Hoof
- Jack Simmons – Flat Jack, Simmo
- Harbhajan Singh – Bhajji, Turbanator
- Mandeep Singh – Mandy
- Yuvraj Singh – Yuvi, Prince
- Brun Smith – Brun, Runty
- Dwayne Smith - The Doctor
- E J Smith – Tiger
- Frank Smith – Brun, Runty
- Steve Smith – Smithy, Smudge, GOD * Tiger Smith – Tiger
- Fred Spofforth – The Demon
- Alec Stewart – The Gaffer
- Andrew Strauss – Lord Brocket, Straussy, Levi, Muppet, Johann, Mare Man
- Bert Sutcliffe – Suttie
- Andrew Symonds – Roy

=== T ===
- Hugh Tayfield – Toey
- Bob Taylor – Chat
- Brian Taylor – Tonker
- Mark Taylor – Tubby
- Ross Taylor – Rosco, Pallekelle Plunderer
- Sachin Tendulkar – The God of Cricket, Master Blaster, Little Master, Bombay Bomber, Tendlya
- Shardul Thakur – Lord Shardul, Lord
- Jeff Thomson – Thommo, Two-Up
- Marcus Trescothick – Tresco, Banger
- Fred Trueman – Fiery
- Phil Tufnell – Tuffers, The Cat
- Alan Turner – Fitteran
- Charles Turner – The Terror
- Frank Tyson – Typhoon

=== U ===
- Derek Underwood – Deadly

=== W ===
- Max Walker – Tangles
- Merv Wallace – Flip
- Georgia Wareham – Wolfie
- Shane Warne – Warnie, The King of Spin, The Sheikh of Tweak,
- Pelham Warner – Plum
- Mark Waugh – Afghan, the Forgotten Waugh, Junior, Audi
- Steve Waugh – Tugga
- Jack White – Farmer
- Kane Williamson – The King
- Bob Willis – Goose, Dylan, Harold, Swordfish
- Paul Wilson – Blocker
- Lauren Winfield – Loz
- Chris Woakes – Wizard
- Danni Wyatt – Waggy

=== Y ===
- Suryakumar Yadav – SKY
- Bruce Yardley – Roo

=== Z ===
- Monde Zondeki – All Hands

== See also ==
- List of cricket terms
- Lists of nicknames – nickname list articles on Wikipedia
