= Neighbours theme song =

"Neighbours"
- 1987 UK single sleeve

Single by Barry Crocker
- A-side: "Neighbours"
- B-side: "Neighbours (Instrumental)"
- Released: 1987
- Recorded: 1984
- Genre: Pop
- Length: 2:48
- Label: Sony
- Songwriters: Tony Hatch; Jackie Trent

The Neighbours theme song is the theme tune to the Australian soap opera Neighbours. Composed by Tony Hatch with the lyrics written by his then wife, Jackie Trent, it was once voted the world's most recognised television theme song. Neighbours was originally recorded by Barry Crocker, who also recorded the updated version. Subsequent versions have been recorded by a variety of artists.

== Composition ==
After Trent and Hatch relocated to Australia in the 1980s, they were asked to write the theme song for Neighbours. The soap opera was going to be called Ramsay Street, before the couple penned the song. Trent told Jessie Stoelwinder from The West Australian, "We wrote the song as Neighbours because we said Ramsay Street was too close to Coronation Street, which was the major soap in Britain." The theme was written and recorded in a day and Trent said, "We called in Barry Crocker at about 10pm to put his voice on it and it was on the producer's desk by 10am the following morning. And they loved it, so the series was then called Neighbours."

== Theme song ==
Since 1985, there have been ten different renditions of the theme broadcast on television. They were sung by the following artists:

Version	Artist	Duration
1	Barry Crocker	18 March 1985 – 6 July 1989
2	Barry Crocker	7 July 1989 – 15 May 1992
3	Greg Hind	18 May 1992 – 27 November 1998
4	Paul Norton and Wendy Stapleton	18 January 1999 – 14 December 2001
5	Janine Maunder	21 January 2002 – 20 July 2007
6	Sandra de Jong	23 July 2007 – 12 April 2013
7	Stephanie Angelini and Daniel Boys	15 April 2013 – 5 December 2014
8	Garth Ploog	5 January 2015 – 24 March 2020
9	Bonnie Anderson	25 March 2020 – 28 July 2022
10	Chris Sebastian	18 September 2023 – 11 December 2025

Depending on the broadcaster, each theme has received edits for timing purposes, the most edited versions was broadcast by the BBC in the UK. To begin with, this was because the BBC could not broadcast the advertising featured at the end of Neighbours credit roles; it was also due to a 30-second timing restriction imposed on all programming. Other broadcasters have usually shown the credits uncut, leaving the theme song at its original length.

=== Version 1 ===
The full closing theme of version one that was attached to Seven Network-commissioned episodes received a few edits following the # day #, # away #, # blend # and # friends # climaxes when it was shown on the BBC, but was left untouched in the rest of the world. Shortly after the Network Ten episodes began on the BBC the full uncut version was used.

Version one was released in 1988 as a single, and charted at number 83 in the UK Singles Chart. It remained on the chart for five weeks. This version contained the full closing theme and the last verse being repeated twice. The opening also featured a guitar section, as well as additional piano chords (which was also heard in 1990 often during the pre-titles episode recap)

Another version with different lyrics by Mark Little and Cathy Farr was produced and released as a single (subtitled Episode 2001). It was sung by actors Lisa Armytage, Anne Charleston, Fiona Corke, Alan Dale, Annie Jones, Paul Keane, Craig McLachlan and Ian Smith. The B-side included merged lyrics of the original and the Little/Farr rewrite.

=== Version 2 ===
The opening theme of version two changed frequently. From the introduction of the updated song in July 1989, following episode 1000 until midway through 1990, there was a full length opening song which was essentially a sped-up version of the original with a few new chords. Midway through 1990, this was replaced with a 10-second instrumental piece with two primary instruments, a harmonica and an electric piano, used in the first episode shown on Channel 7, and in several commercials for the show during the 1980s. This was used for a few weeks before being replaced by a 7-second vocal version of the same short piece. This lasted until the debut of version three of the theme in May 1992.

=== Version 3 ===
Version three used a jazzy, funky 23 second opening song. This was arranged by Peter Sullivan, and had its debut in 1992 essentially as a re-record of the 1985 and 1989 Barry Crocker versions of the theme with Melbourne-based singer Greg Hind. Its closing theme differed significantly from the previous two arrangements in that it concentrated solely on repeating the second verse of the song to make up the song's length, thus discarding lyrics e.g. # Helps to make a better day # and # Next door is only a footstep away #. This song was heavily edited and used as a revised opening theme from part-way through the 1994 season onwards, and was adopted as the BBC's closing theme from 1995.

=== Version 4 ===
Version four, arranged by music director / screen composer Chris Pettifer, debuted in 1999 essentially as a re-record of the 1992 theme with two Melbourne-based singers Wendy Stapleton and Paul Norton. Pettifer changed it to a more rock & roll key to suit the vocalists and introduced over-driven electric guitar, giving it a rockier feel. The opening theme reverted to 23 seconds and replaced # Everybody needs good neighbours # with # Should be there for one another #. Once again there was a shortened closing theme for UK transmission (The full version was only heard during documentary series Neighbours Revealed). One of the major changes made to the theme heard in Australia during this era was the removal of the repeated backing vocal # That's when good... # from mid-2000 onwards, although this remained on episodes broadcast outside of Australia and the UK.

=== Version 5 ===
Version five was launched in January 2002 and once again a shorter piece of closing music was edited for the UK market, with the rest of the world using the same 76 second variant. This was sung by Janine Maunder and arranged by Steve Wade. The opening and closing songs followed the same lyrical and verse arrangement introduced in 1992. In the show's 20th anniversary episode broadcast, The song was reduced to an instrumental in the end credits so former characters who made cameos would be audible when they made parting messages.

In 2006 a very slightly remixed version of the same closing theme debuted. The intention was for all territories to begin transmitting the same 45 second version at the end of their episodes, however UK broadcasts retained the previous 35 second arrangement for a few weeks until they received a newer batch of episodes with the revised theme attached. Despite a brief period of uniformity, by mid-2006 the BBC had requested further edits to be made to their version of the song to bring it back down to 35 seconds. Australia then reverted to an almost full length track, albeit with minor edits at various sections to keep running time to 55 seconds, whilst other markets, including New Zealand and the Republic of Ireland, continued to receive the original 45 second arrangement launched at the start of 2006. This meant that for over a year between 2006–2007 there were three different edits of the closing theme tune being broadcast around the world as well as three different closing credits designs to accompany them.

Despite the many edits made to the 2002–2007 closing song, the opening theme remained unchanged for the duration at 23 seconds. This version is also featured on the soundtrack album Neighbours: The Music.

=== Version 6 ===
A new version of the theme tune, sung by Sandra de Jong, debuted in Australia on 23 July 2007 as part of a revamp of the show. This was arranged by Neighbours Music Director Chris Pettifer and songwriter-producer Adrian Hannan. The opening song is longer than in recent years at 29 seconds, and is also notable for re-introducing # Everybody needs good neighbours # to the opening song after an eight-year absence. The full edition of the closing theme continued to solely use the second verse of the Neighbours song, as had been the case since 1992. The new version did not, however, repeat the verse, using instead a repetitive technique applied to the # That's when good neighbours become good friends # line and an additional instrumental piece to make up the theme's length which remains unchanged at 55 seconds. For the 2008 season onwards, Australian episodes were followed by a shorter 18 second instrumental arrangement of the new theme tune, accompanying shortened closing credits on Monday-Thursday episodes. Friday episodes transmit with the full closing sequence. In the UK, the 18-second closing credits were adopted as of episode of 5331 for all episodes broadcast, including Fridays and omnibuses, whilst New Zealand and Ireland currently follows the arrangement used by Australia.

=== Version 7 ===
On 18 February 2013, the serial launched Neighbours Remixed, a competition to find a new singer for the theme tune. Fans from Australia and the United Kingdom were invited to take part in the contest, which was called "Neighbours Remixed". Contestants were asked to record and upload themselves singing the updated version of the theme. Five finalists from each country were shortlisted and their version of the theme was broadcast over the opening titles of Neighbours episodes on Eleven and Channel 5 from 18 March. Viewers were then invited to vote for their favourite entry. Daniel Boys from the United Kingdom and Stephanie Angelini from Australia went head-to-head in Melbourne to become the vocalist on the revamped and remixed theme tune.

Original theme vocalist Barry Crocker, plus executive producer Richard Jasek and music director Chris Pettifer were on the judging panel to decide the winner of the competition. On 8 April, the judges announced that the competition had resulted in a tie, meaning that Angelini and Boys would sing the theme tune together. Crocker commented "Both Daniel and Stephanie are delightful ambassadors for their respective countries, not to mention terrific singers. I think the duet is a wonderful rendition to the Neighbours theme and harks back to the original I recorded 28 years ago." The new theme tune began airing over the opening titles from 15 April 2013. On 7 October 2013, an updated credits sequence began airing with a "tweaked" version of the theme tune.

=== Version 8 ===
A new retro-inspired theme tune, sung by Garth Ploog, debuted on 5 January 2015 as part of the show's 30th anniversary celebrations.

The theme tune was remixed in February 2019 by composer and producer Dariush Etemad. It was used as the cast took part in the Sydney Gay and Lesbian Mardi Gras parade.

=== Version 9 ===
A new version of the theme tune sung by Neighbours actress Bonnie Anderson debuted on 25 March 2020, as the opening titles were updated following two cast departures. Of being asked to record the theme, Anderson stated, "We're trying to keep it to the iconic theme song that it is – and not create a hip-hop track or anything like that! This is really cool for me to be doing the theme song, especially being a singer myself. It was really an honour to be asked to do this. Honestly, I got emotional!"

=== Version 10 ===
Ahead of the serial's return on 18 September 2023, it was announced that Chris Sebastian, the winner of ninth season of The Voice, had been chosen to sing the theme song. Sebastian admitted that he was "shocked and of course over the moon" to have been chosen to record the song. He continued: "I have grown up with that soundtrack and I still can't quite believe that this is real. Neighbours, we are all so glad you are back, it hasn't been the same without our friends. I hope you guys love my version of the theme song as much as I loved recording it for you."

=== Sombre version ===
A sombre piano version of the theme is reserved to close episodes that featured the deaths of long-standing or original characters. The edited version played over the closing credits is taken from a much longer composition, excerpts of which were often played in the original 1985 season over tender moments and sparingly throughout the serial's run. The edited version has accompanied a relevant photo montage during the closing credits of key episodes surrounding the deaths of three major characters, starting in 1992 with Todd Landers, in the episode after his death, and was used again for the deaths of Jim Robinson and Helen Daniels. Madge Bishop also received the sad theme tune over the regular 2001 season closing sequence. The sombre version was used during the episode broadcast on 8 April 2014, following the death of Kate Ramsay (Ashleigh Brewer). An updated version of the sombre theme was used for the death of David Tanaka (Takaya Honda) in episode 8983, broadcast on 1 February 2024, and for the departure of Harold Bishop (Ian Smith) in episode 9224, broadcast on 14 April 2025.

== Reception ==
The theme to Neighbours was once voted the world's most recognised television theme song. It also came fourth in a survey by the building society Abbey National to find the most memorable theme tune, beating out rival soap operas EastEnders and Coronation Street. The theme was included in The Independent's feature on the "Top Ten Classic TV Theme Tunes", with a reporter adding "you know you have a cracker of a theme song when everyone knows the tune." Sam of TVFix placed the theme song at number one on his list of the "Top 5 Australian TV Theme Songs", writing that "Ramsay Street's anthem is just so shamelessly daggy – the original version was sung by Barry Crocker! – that it's a more perfect embodiment of suburban Australia." In 2020, Shona Hendley of the Herald Sun said the theme song was one of "the best things about Neighbours". She stated "There have been eight versions but the essential ingredient are the key lines: That's when good neighbours become good friends. Simple, idealistic and oh so 1980s."

Sunday World critic Pauline Cronin hated the third version sung by Greg Hind. She wrote "Until recently, the best thing about the awful Aussie soap was the signature tune. And I know that doesn't say a lot for the acting. But the recent rejigging of the tune renders it completely tuneless. Imagine all those toddlers who normally sway happily twice a day when they hear it, now tripping over their little toes thanks to this choppy change! Did anyone listen to it before they aired it? Does anybody care? I thought not."

In 1999, Merle Brown from the Daily Record expressed her dislike of the new version sung by Norton and Stapleton, saying "all I want to say about Neighbours is where did they get that new theme tune? Unbelievably it's worse than the original one!" Fans of the show disliked the version of the theme tune introduced in 2013. Ben Pobjie from The Age also disliked that version, saying "Barry Crocker must be scandalised. His beloved and iconic interpretation of the theme to Neighbours has been mauled beyond all recognition. I don't think it's even the same tune. I'm not sure it even is a tune any more."

=== Political and cultural impact ===
The lyric of the song were famously quoted by John Smith, the then United Kingdom Shadow Chancellor, in a House of Commons Debate on government economic policy. Smith was bringing to attention the divergence in the economic policies of, and the tensions in the relationship between the Prime Minister, Margaret Thatcher, and her Chancellor of the Exchequer, (and Downing Street "neighbour") Nigel Lawson. This speech was considered one of the most effective and memorable of modern times, and Lawson was soon replaced in Number 11 by John Major. Within 18 months of the speech, Thatcher herself was replaced in Number 10, also by Major.

Some of the lyrics of the song were also quoted on the BBC television show That's Life! in the 1990s as part of a campaign called "Unfriendly Neighbours".

In August 2005, Muslim students sang the theme tune to the then Prime Minister of Australia, John Howard, amid a row over the banning of hijabs at a school. The following year, Billy Cooper was thrown out of the Gabba and arrested for playing the theme tune on his trumpet during the 2006–07 Ashes series.

The 1980s version of the theme song was also featured in the Lily Allen song "Fuck You", where the song contained the piano tune from the theme music at the beginning of Allen's song. In April 2014, American actor Seth Rogen sang the theme song in a television commercial promoting his film Bad Neighbours in Australia.

In February 2022, Corine Vuyk launched an online campaign to get Barry Crocker's version of the theme tune to number one in the UK charts, after British broadcaster Channel 5 decided to cut the show's funding, leaving it facing cancellation. The song later reached the top of the UK iTunes chart. In an interview with David Knox of TV Tonight, Crocker said he was "thrilled" by the news. He also stated "It could be the little song that saved Neighbours. I'd love it for people to jump on board. Someone will say 'Listen this has still got legs, so let's pick it up.' Hopefully it will be picked up, continue on and keep a lot of people in work." Although the song reached number 1 on the UK's iTunes chart, it failed to chart in the Top 100 of the UK Official Singles Chart. It did, however, debut at number 11 on the UK Official Singles Sales Chart Top 100 on 11 February 2022.
