= Bukhchuluun Ganburged =

Mongolian Australian throat-singer

- Also known as: Bukhu, Bukhu Ganburged
- Born: February 25, 1985 (age 40); Ulaanbaatar, Mongolia
- Genres: Overtone singing; World music; Folk music; New Age music; Electronic music
- Occupation: Musician / Singer / Songwriter
- Years active: 2005–present

Bukhchuluun Ganburged (Mongolian: Бүхчулуун Ганбүргэд) (born 25 February 1985 in Ulaanbaatar), also known as Bukhu, is a Mongolian Australian virtuoso throat-singer and Morin Khuur player.

Bukhchuluun graduated in 2007 as a master student of the Mongolian Music and Dance Conservatory in Ulaanbaatar performing the Mongolian Statehood Long song recognised by UNESCO as one of the Masterpieces of the Oral and Intangible Heritage of Humanity.

Based in Sydney, Australia since 2009, Bukhu was granted Australian permanent resident status on a Distinguished Talent Visa by the Australian government as an internationally recognised artist with exceptional and outstanding contributions to the arts.

In 2013, Bukhu was featured in Angela Mesiti's work Citizen Band for the Anne Landa Award for video and new media arts at the Art Gallery of New South Wales.

In 2015, Bukhu featured in the theme song for Sega's strategy video game title Total War: Attila. In the same year notable composer and ABC Radio National host Andrew Ford named Bukhchuluun Ganburged amongst his selections for Australian Music Month.

On 25 May 2016, Bukhu performed at the Sydney Opera House for TEDxSydney.

In 2017, the Museum of Applied Arts & Sciences featured Bukhu in the This is a Voice exhibition at the Powerhouse Museum.

In 2020, Bukhu appeared in The Voice (Australian season 9) on Team Guy Sebastian.

== Bands ==
Bukhu has appeared in numerous bands and featured guest performances notably Horse and Wood, Equus, and Dangerous Song.

=== Horse and Wood ===
Horse and Wood is Duo featuring an ongoing collaboration with John Robinson, combining Bukhu's Morin Khuur and Robinsons' Oud. The idea for the band was first conceived during Woodford Folk Festival over the New Year's Eve period between 2010 and 2011, culminating in a fusion of Mongolian and Turkish Folk and Bluegrass styles.

=== Equus ===
Equus is an Australian Folk fusion Quartet producing music influenced by traditional Mongolian music fused with Middle Eastern strings and a Jazz rhythm section. Featuring Bukhu in collaboration with John Robinson (Oud, Turkish Baglama, guitar), Peter Kennard (Percussion), and Bertie McMahon (Double bass).

=== AYA ===
AYA Is a unique Trio with Bukhu joining New Age Fusion act 'Dangerous Song' featuring Linsey Pollak and Lizzie O'Keefe. Pollak plays endangered animal calls including Humpback Whales, Giant Lemurs, Gibbons on a digital wind instrument with live looping and soundscapes, accompanied by O'Keefe's ethereal improvised vocals.

== Discography ==
=== Albums ===
Title	Details
Bukhu - Throat Singer and Horse Fiddle Player	Released: 2010; Label: Bukhu
The Journey	Released: 2 March 2021; Label: Bukhu

=== Singles ===
Title	Details
The Journey (Single)	Released: 26 March 2021; Label: Bukhu; Time: 4:08
Father	Released: 28 April 2022; Label: Bukhu; Time: 3:20
Blue Spot	Released: 5 May 2021; Label: Bukhu; Time: 3:55

=== Featured ===
Year	Artist	Title	Length	Details
2021	Danny Avila	Mother & Father (feat. Bukhu)	3:20	Released: 1 October 2021; Label: Armada Music
2021	Bjorth	Khishigten (feat. Bukhu)	3:57	Released: 17 December 2021; Label: DarkDrones

== Awards and nominations ==
=== ARIA Music Awards ===
The ARIA Music Awards is an annual ceremony presented by Australian Recording Industry Association (ARIA), which recognise excellence, innovation, and achievement across all genres of the music of Australia. They commenced in 1987.

Year	Nominee / work	Award	Result	Ref.
2021	The Journey	Best World Music Album	Nominated	

== Music Sample Libraries ==
Bukhu has recorded a series of vocal and instrumental sample libraries for the Native Instruments Kontakt sampler with NKS partners Evolution Series.

=== Chronicles of Bukhu ===
The first collaboration titled 'Chronicles of Bukhu' was released in October 2021. Featuring a combination of movement and textural based vocal and Horse Fiddle performances on a virtual soundstage.

=== Lores ===
The second collaboration 'Lores' released in April 2022, features Bukhu as an instrument in a suite of sample libraries curated by composer Clinton Shorter. The library brings together traditional strings and eclectic instruments, such as the Hurdy-Gurdy, Shakuhachi, and medieval pipes along with Bukhu's Mongolian Horse Fiddle.
