= Matt Gresham =

Australian musician

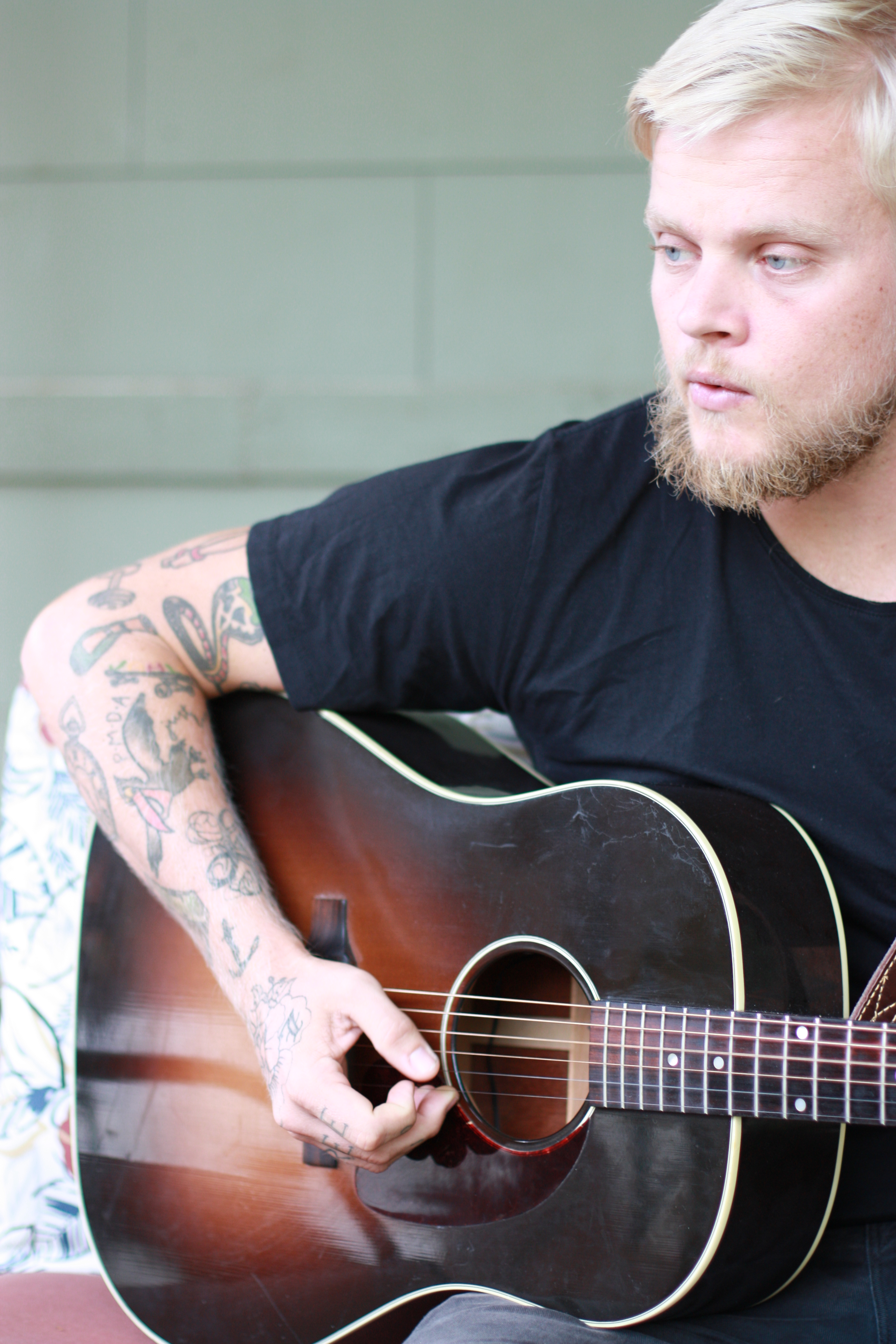
- Matt Gresham in 2016

Background information
- Born: Matthew Beau Gresham; 22 September 1988 (age 37); Perth, Western Australia
- Genres: folk; blues; electronic; indie
- Occupation: Singer-songwriter
- Instruments: Vocals, guitar
- Years active: 2006–present
- Labels: Matt Gresham, Warner Music Germany
- Website: mattgresham.com.au

Matthew Beau Gresham (born 22 September 1988), is an Australian singer and songwriter from Perth, Western Australia. He has supported Vera Blue, James Arthur, Guy Sebastian and Shane Filan. He defined his style as folk, blues, electronic and indie. He is best known for winning first place at the 2017 International Songwriting Competition and for his participation in The X Factor (Australia) (2013) and The Voice (Australia) (2020).

== Music career ==
=== 2006-2012: Independent Releases ===
In 2006, Gresham released his first album The Recipe on My Space. At the 2006 Western Australian Rock Music Industry Association Awards, his song "Happy Birthday Dave" won the WAM Song of the Year in the Upper Secondary category.

In 2008, Gresham released his first live album Live. It was also known as Good Times and Live at Bar Orient. Amazon reviewed the album saying "Matt Gresham's fresh, spirited album entitled Good Times reflects upon his recent live performances and new found modern blues style, with integrated country and reggae influences, demonstrating that he is a songwriter of proven talent, versatility and audience-pleasing cleverness."

In 2009, Gresham released June. The album was recorded over a period of 9 months and was dedicated to his late grandmother June. Amazon reviewed the album saying "June shows Gresham at his melodic best, ranging from tender ballads to full-on rocking country and blues & roots numbers."

In November 2012, Gresham released his third studio album, See the World.

=== 2013: The X Factor ===
After years of gigging around Fremantle, in 2013, Gresham auditioned for the fifth season of The X factor Australia. Gresham made it to the top 24, but decided he could not commit to the competition and was replaced by eventual winner Dami Im.

In 2016, Gresham reflected "The show really helped me develop confidence and a strong work ethic but, in the end, it just wasn't the direction I wanted to go. But I don't regret it at all (leaving the competition): it was a great experience and I learnt a lot." In 2020, added "As a creative, they (The X Factor contracts) don't give you much freedom when it comes to artistic direction which is the whole purpose of being in the arts. And they don't really tell until you're at the crunching point, where you have to make a choice."

=== 2014-2019: International recognition ===
In May 2014, Gresham released the track "Whiskey". Gresham said the song is a reflection of a dark time in his life. "My partner had recently left me – we were married actually – and I was having trouble accepting that it was over – so the song, for me, was a healing song; getting out all the heavy emotions that come along with a break-up." "Whiskey" won Song of the Year in the Blues and Roots category at the 2014 Western Australian Music Awards.

In December 2014, Gresham released his fourth studio album, The Beautiful Emptiness. Lukas Murphy from The Music said the album is "wrought with the tender emotions of a tragic journey through love and loss" adding "these songs are meaningful and profound, with wisdom, life and worlds of experience behind them" The songs on the album were recorded all around the world.

In February 2016, Gresham released "Small Voices", which was co-written with Los Angeles based producer Jaymes Young. Gresham said the original concept for the song was about his mother being forced to live a city life and how she missed mother nature, but the song evolved into a story about a man missing his daughter from a prison cell.

In March 2016, Gresham played at the South by Southwest (SXSW). Shortly after, Gresham relocated to Berlin and signing with Warner Music Germany.

In September 2016 Gresham released "Survive on Love", which was again, co-written with Young. It was shortlisted for the 2016 Vanda & Young Songwriting Competition and in 2017, won first place at the International Songwriting Competition (Unpublished Category).

Gresham toured Australian on the Survive on Love tour across January and February 2017.

In 2018, Gresham released the album, Who Am I Now, which was proceeded by a number of singles.

In August 2018, Gresham learned that his best friend Luke Liang took his own life aged 28 and Gresham struggled with post-traumatic stress disorder and depression. Gresham said "It was tough. I didn't really know much about PTSD before I had it. I thought it was something that you acquire from war or things like that."

=== 2020: The Voice ===
In 2020 Gresham auditioned for the ninth season of The Voice Australia where he joined team Delta Goodrem. He was eliminated in the battle rounds by saved by and joined team Guy Sebastian. He reached the top 20 before being eliminated from the competition.

The Voice performances and results (2020)
Episode	Song	Original Artist	Result
Audition	"Bruises"	Lewis Capaldi	Through to Battle Rounds
Battle Rounds	"Slide Away"	Miley Cyrus	Lost. Saved by Guy Sebastian. Through to The play-offs
The play-offs	"Half a Man"	Dean Lewis	Lost. Saved by and given wildcard by Guy Sebastian. Through to Show Downs
Show Downs	"Who Am I Now?"	Matt Gresham	Eliminated

Immediately following his performance of "Who Am I Now?", the song and album trended. The song and album reached official charts the following week, peaking at number 1 on the Australian Indie chart and 3 on the Australian Digital Sales Chart.

On 24 August 2020, Gresham release "Hotel Floors", the lead single from his next studio album.

== Discography ==
=== Albums ===
Title	Details	Peak chart positions
Title	Details	AIR
Recipe	Released: 2006; Label: (released via MySpace); Format: digital download	—
Good Times/Live at Bar Orient	Released: 2008; Label: Matt Gresham / MGM; Format: CD, digital download; Note: Live album	—
June	Released: 2009; Label: Matt Gresham / MGM (MG003); Format: CD, digital download	—
See the World	Released: November 2012; Label: Gresham Productions; Format: CD, digital download	—
The Beautiful Emptiness	Released: November 2014; Label: Gresham Productions; Format: CD, digital download	—
One Night in May	Released: 3 May 2015; Label: Gresham Productions; Format: digital download, streaming	—
Who Am I Now	Released: 17 August 2018; Label: Trigger Records / Warner Music Central Europe; Format: digital download, streaming, CD	6

=== Singles ===
List of singles as lead artist, with selected chart positions
Title	Year	Peak chart positions		Album
Title	Year	AUS digital	AUS indie	Album
"Whiskey"	2014	—	—	The Beautiful Emptiness
"7"	2014	—	—	The Beautiful Emptiness
"Stand Up"	2014	—	—	The Beautiful Emptiness
"Fall"	2014	—	—	The Beautiful Emptiness
"Small Voices"	2016	—	—	Non-album single
"Ghost"	2016	—	—	Non-album single
"Survive on Love"	2016	—	—	Non-album single
"Home"	2018	—	—	Who I Am Now
"High Wire"	2018	—	—	Who I Am Now
"Rising Up"	2018	—	—	Who I Am Now
"Say You Don't"	2018	—	—	Who I Am Now
"Who Am I Now"	2018	3	1	Who I Am Now
"Slide Away" (live) (with Stellar Perry)	2020	—	—N/a	The Voice
"Half a Man" (live)	2020	—	—N/a	The Voice
"Who Am I Now?" (live)	2020	—	—N/a	The Voice
"Hotel Floors"	2020	—	—	TBA
"Let Your Light Out"	2021	—	—	TBA

== Awards ==
=== WAM Song of the Year ===
The WAM Song of the Year was formed by the Western Australian Rock Music Industry Association Inc. (WARMIA) in 1985, with its main aim to develop and run annual awards recognising achievements within the music industry in Western Australia.

Year	Nominee / work	Award	Result (wins only)
2006	"Happy Birthday Dave"	Upper Secondary School	Won
