= The Voice (Australian TV series) season 9 =

The Voice
- Season 9
- Promotional poster featuring coaches Boy George, Goodrem, Sebastian, and Rowland
- Hosted by: Darren McMullen; Renee Bargh
- Coaches: Guy Sebastian; Delta Goodrem; Boy George; Kelly Rowland
- Winner: Chris Sebastian
- Winning coach: Kelly Rowland
- Runners-up: Johnny Manuel, Siala Robson and Stellar Perry

Release
- Original network: Nine Network
- Original release: 24 May – 19 July 2020

Season chronology
- ← Previous; Season 8 Next → Season 10

The ninth season of The Voice began airing on 24 May 2020. For the first time in the show's history all of the coaches returned: Delta Goodrem for her eighth, Kelly Rowland and Boy George for their fourth and Guy Sebastian for his second. Following the exit of Sonia Kruger, Darren McMullen, who hosted the first four seasons, returns with new co-host, Renee Bargh.

Chris Sebastian from Team Kelly won the competition on 19 July 2020, marking the second All-Star to win, as well as Kelly Rowland's second and final victory as a coach in her fourth, and final, season on The Voice Australia.

== Coaches and hosts ==
Coaches and Host(s) of The Voice Season 9

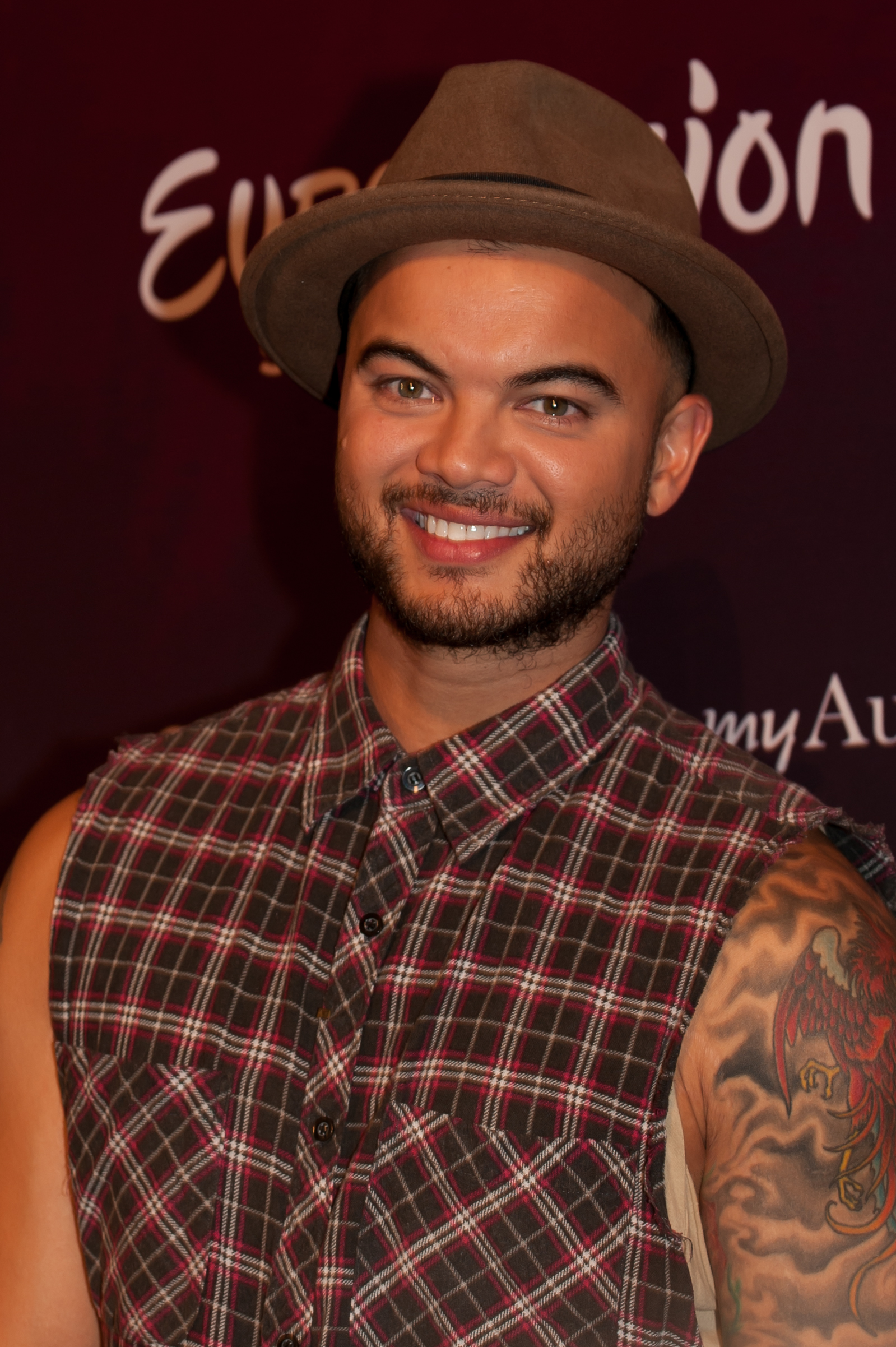
Guy Sebastian

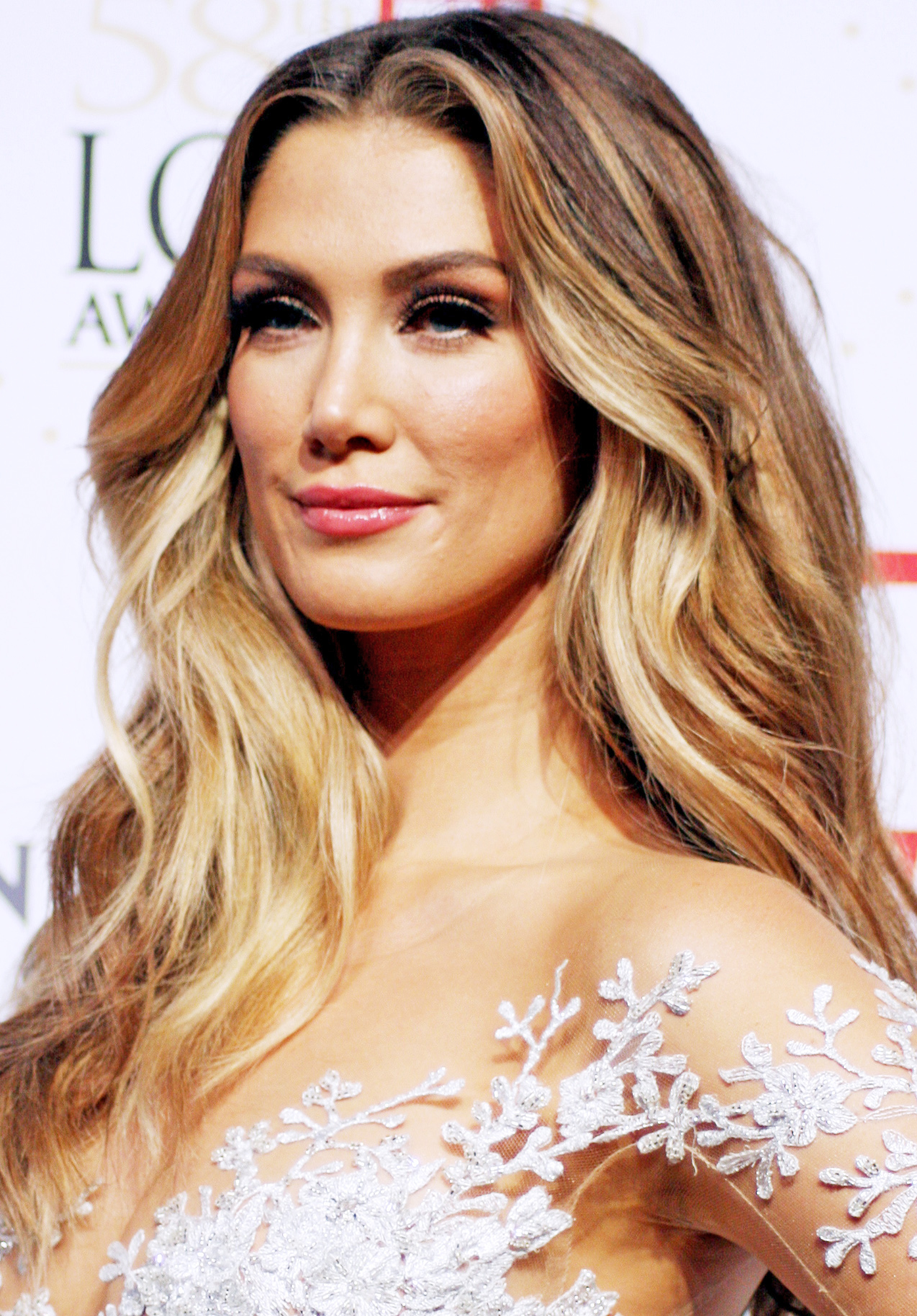
Delta Goodrem

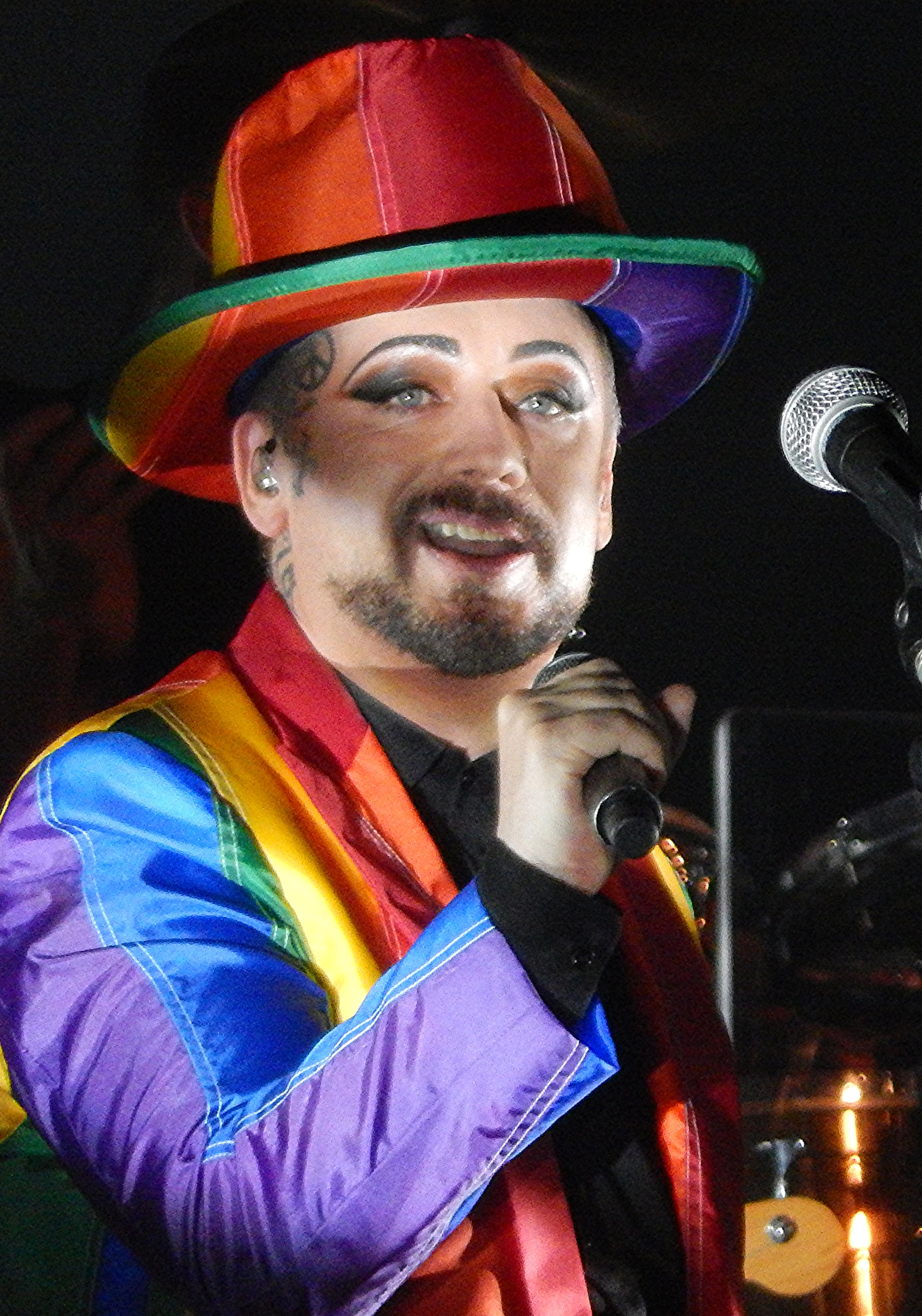
Boy George

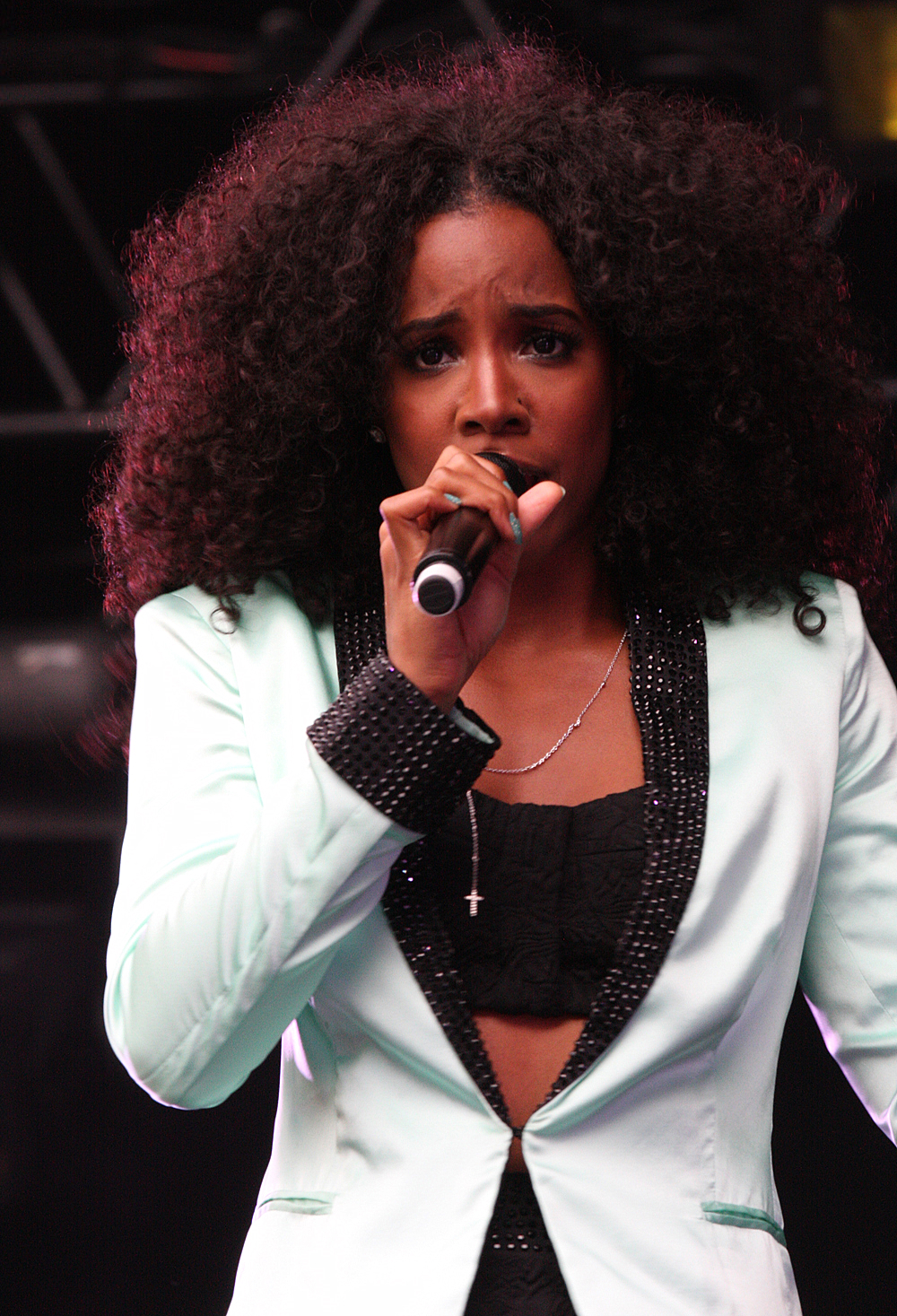
Kelly Rowland

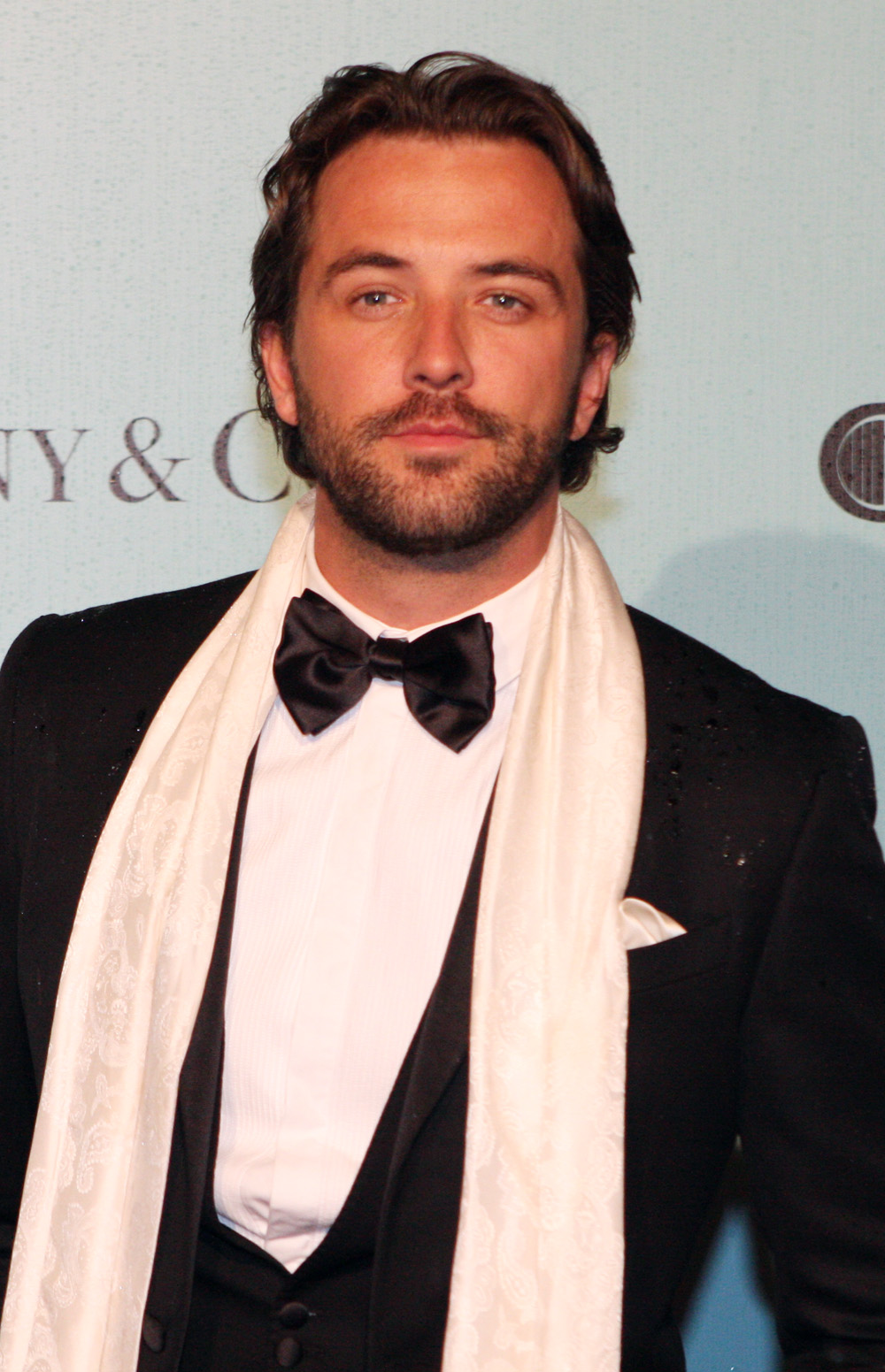
Darren McMullen (host)

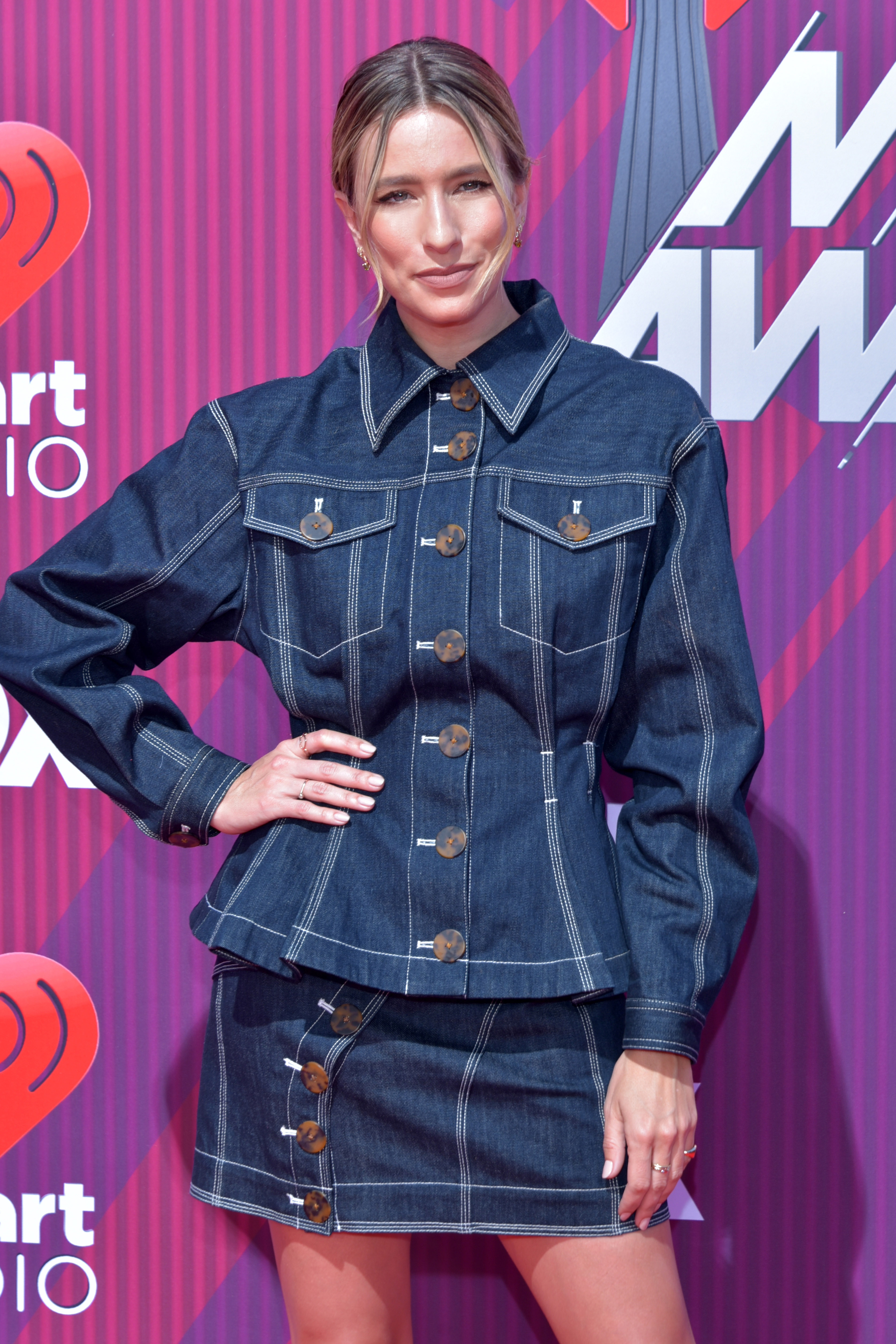
Renee Bargh

Right after the end of the eighth season, the series was renewed for a ninth season and was announced that all coaches would return the new season. Darren McMullen, who exited as host following the conclusion of the fourth season, returns as host, alongside new co-host Renee Bargh, following the exit of Sonia Kruger.

In June 2020 the Sydney Morning Herald reported that Marcia Hines and The Veronicas were to fill in as guest mentors for Rowland and Boy George respectively, who will be mentoring their acts remotely from the US and UK because of travel restrictions in place due to the COVID-19 pandemic.

== Teams ==
Colour key

- Winner
- Runner-up
- Third place
- Fourth place
- Eliminated in the Semifinals
- Eliminated in the Showdowns
- Eliminated in the Playoffs
- Artist was saved in the Battle rounds by their coach or another coach
- Eliminated in the Battle rounds
- Withdrew due to COVID-19 travel restrictions

Season nine coaching teams
Coach	Top 49				
Guy Sebastian					
Guy Sebastian	Johnny Manuel	Timothy Bowen	Adam Ludewig	**Matt Gresham**	Stephanie Cole
Guy Sebastian	Josh Pywell	Soma Sutton	Wolf Winters	~~Elyse Sene-Lefao~~	~~Jimi the Kween~~
Guy Sebastian	Bukhu Ganburged	Kirby Burgess	Luke Biscan	Natalie Gauci	Xy Latu
Delta Goodrem					
Delta Goodrem	**Stellar Perry**	Jesse Teinaki	Clarissa Spata	Goldi	Steve Clisby
Delta Goodrem	Claudia Harrison	Emmagen Rain	Graeme Isaako	~~Elishia Semaan~~	~~Janie Gordon~~
Delta Goodrem	~~Matt Evans~~	~~Matt Gresha~~	Callum Gleeson	Maddy Thomas	
Boy George					
Boy George	Siala Robson	Masha Mnjoyan	Angela Fabian	**Elyse Sene-Lefao**	Virginia Lillye †
Boy George	Nathan Isaac	Roxane LeBrasse	Sapphire Tamalemai	Caleb Jago-Ward	~~Clarissa Spata~~
Boy George	~~Despina Savva~~	Andy Dexterity	Jonathon Welch	Ricky Muscat	Sebastian Coe
Kelly Rowland					
Kelly Rowland	Chris Sebastian	Mark Furze	Alex Weybury	**Despina Savva**	**Lyric McFarland**
Kelly Rowland	Bo'Ness	Elishia Semaan	Jimi the Kween	Ella Monnery	~~Masha Mnjoyan~~
Kelly Rowland	~~Sapphire Tamalemai~~	~~Soma Sutton~~	Charlie McFarlane	Emma Mylott	Mason Lloyde
Note: Italicized names are saved artists (names struck through within former teams). Bolded names are artist chosen as Wildcards.

- Due to COVID-19 and international travel restrictions, Caleb Jago-Ward and Ella Monnery could not travel from New Zealand to perform in the Playoffs. Elyse Sene-Lefao and Jimi the Kween were chosen to replace them, respectively.

== Blind auditions ==
In the Blind Auditions, each coach had to complete their teams with 12 contestants. New this season, each coach had two Blocks to prevent another of the coaches from getting a contestant.

Season nine blind auditions colour key
✔	Coach hit the "I WANT YOU" button
✔	Coach hit the "I WANT YOU" button despite the lack of spaces in his/her team
	Artist defaulted to this team
	Artist elected to join this team
	Artist eliminated with no coach pressing "I WANT YOU" button
	Artist received a 'Four-Chair Turn'.
	Artist is an 'All Star' contestant.
✘	Coach pressed "I WANT YOU" button, but was blocked by another coach from getting the artist
	Blocked by Guy; Blocked by Delta; Blocked by George; Blocked by Kelly

=== Episode 1 (24 May) ===
Episode one blind auditions
Order	Artist	Age	Song	Coaches and artists choices			
Order	Artist	Age	Song	Guy	Delta	George	Kelly
1	Adam Ludewig	16	"Leave a Light On"	✔	✔	✔	✔
2	Despina Savva	14	"Idontwannabeyouanymore"	✔	✔	✔	✔
3	Roxane LeBrasse	37	"Best of My Love"	✔	✔	✔	✔
4	Virginia Lillye	50	"Barracuda"	—	✔	✔	—
5	Josh Pywell	28	"Run to Paradise"	✔	✔	—	—
6	Jon Wiza	28	"Don't Stop Believin'"	—	—	—	—
7	Stellar Perry	36	"Always Remember Us This Way"	✔	✔	✘	✔

=== Episode 2 (25 May) ===
Episode two blind auditions
Order	Artist	Age	Song	Coaches and artists choices			
Order	Artist	Age	Song	Guy	Delta	George	Kelly
1	Janie Gordon	21	"Songbird"	✔	✔	✔	✔
2	Stephanie Cole	23	"The Middle"	✔	✔	—	—
3	Chris Sebastian	31	"Jealous"	✔	✔	✔	✔
4	Charlie McFarlane	22	"Sign of the Times"	—	—	✔	✔
5	Jimi the Kween	27	"Wicked Game"	✔	✔	✔	✔
6	Megan Vuillemain	26	"Emotion"	—	—	—	—
7	Timothy Bowen	30	"I Can't Make You Love Me"	✔	✔	✔	✔

=== Episode 3 (26 May) ===
Episode three blind auditions
Order	Artist	Age	Song	Coaches and artists choices			
Order	Artist	Age	Song	Guy	Delta	George	Kelly
1	Jesse Teinaki	28	"When the Party's Over"	✔	✔	✔	✔
2	Phoebe Jay	17	"Man! I Feel Like a Woman!"	—	—	—	—
3	Luke Biscan	31	"Resolution"	✔	—	—	✔
4	Sebastian Coe	14	"Sucker"	—	—	✔	—
5	Ella Monnery	23	"Higher Love"	—	✔	✔	✔
6	Olivia Kelly	18	"Video Games"	—	—	—	—
7	Bukhu Ganburged	35	"Mother and Father"	✔	✔	✔	✔

=== Episode 4 (31 May) ===
Episode four blind auditions
Order	Artist	Age	Song	Coaches and artists choices			
Order	Artist	Age	Song	Guy	Delta	George	Kelly
1	Siala Robson	18	"Other Than You" (original song)	✔	✔	✔	✔
2	Kirby Burgess	31	"Maybe This Time"	✔	✔	—	—
3	Emmagen Rain	12	"Somethin' Bad"	—	✔	—	—
4	Matt Gresham	31	"Bruises"	✘	✔	—	✔
5	Jake Meywes	26	"Feeling Good"	—	—	—	—
6	Matt Evans	23	"Need You Tonight"	—	✔	✔	✔
7	Masha Mnjoyan	24	"All by Myself"	✔	✔	✔	✔

=== Episode 5 (1 June) ===
Episode five blind auditions
Order	Artist	Age	Song	Coaches and artists choices			
Order	Artist	Age	Song	Guy	Delta	George	Kelly
1	Caleb Jago-Ward	26	"Confide in Me"	✔	✔	✔	—
2	Georgia Caine	21	"The River"	—	—	—	—
3	Maddy Thomas	15	"Nothing Breaks Like a Heart"	—	✔	✔	✔
4	Carina Grace	55	"It's Raining Men"	—	—	—	—
5	Soma Sutton	26	"Hello"	✔	—	✔	✔
6	Joshua Jake	24	"Happier"	—	—	—	—
7	Alex Weybury	26	"Total Eclipse of the Heart"	✘	✘	✔	✔

=== Episode 6 (2 June) ===
Episode six blind auditions
Order	Artist	Age	Song	Coaches and artists choices			
Order	Artist	Age	Song	Guy	Delta	George	Kelly
1	Angela Fabian	50	"Amazing Grace"	—	✔	✔	✔
2	Elishia Semaan	25	"Never Really Over"	—	✔	—	—
3	Dylan Marguccio	15	"I Want You Back"	—	—	—	—
4	Natalie Gauci	38	"The Greatest"	✔	✔	—	—
5	Jessica Fraser	19	"Don't Start Now"	—	—	—	—
6	Paul Stevens	79	"In My Life"	—	—	—	—
7	Xy Latu	41	"Higher Ground"	✔	✔	✔	✔

=== Episode 7 (7 June) ===
Episode seven blind auditions
Order	Artist	Age	Song	Coaches and artists choices			
Order	Artist	Age	Song	Guy	Delta	George	Kelly
1	Claudia Harrison	18	"O Mio Babbino Caro"	✔	✔	✔	✔
2	Emma Mylott	25	"Bang Bang"	—	—	—	✔
3	Nicole Ferreira	28	"Dancing on My Own"	—	—	—	—
4	Bo'Ness	16	"Dumb Things"	—	—	✔	✔
5	Lyric McFarland	35	"Good as Hell" x "So Good"	—	—	✔	✔
6	Andy Dexterity	34	"Imagine"	✔	✔	✔	✔
7	Johnny Manuel	35	"Home"	✔	✔	✔	✘

=== Episode 8 (8 June) ===
Episode eight blind auditions
Order	Artist	Age	Song	Coaches and artists choices			
Order	Artist	Age	Song	Guy	Delta	George	Kelly
1	Jonathon Welch	61	"This Is the Moment"	—	✔	✔	—
2	Sarah Vellios	34	"A Whole New World"	—	—	—	—
3	Ricky Muscat	36	"Maria Maria"	—	—	✔	✔
4	Billie Kid	37	"Finesse"	—	—	—	—
5	Callum Gleeson	32	"The Loco-Motion"	—	✔	—	—
6	Koby Lee	36	"Perfect Illusion"	—	—	—	—
7	Mark Furze	33	"Blow"	✔	✔	✔	✔

=== Episode 9 (14 June) ===
Episode nine blind auditions
Order	Artist	Age	Song	Coaches and artists choices			
Order	Artist	Age	Song	Guy	Delta	George	Kelly
1	Graeme Isaako	30	"Bad"	—	✔	✔	—
2	Stephen Lean	18	"If I Can't Have You"	—	—	—	—
3	Elyse Sene-Lefao	19	"Big White Room"	✔	—	✘	✘
4	The Lions Den	N/A	"The Lion Sleeps Tonight"	Team Full	—	—	—
5	Nathan Isaac	23	"You Spin Me Round (Like a Record)"	Team Full	✔	✔	—
6	Ula Venckus	16	"Youngblood"	Team Full	—	—	—
7	Ashley Burke		"Stay"	Team Full	—	—	—
8	Clarissa Spata	38	"Nessun dorma"	Team Full	✘	✔	—

=== Episode 10 (15 June) ===
Episode ten blind auditions
Order	Artist	Age	Song	Coaches and artists choices			
Order	Artist	Age	Song	Guy	Delta	George	Kelly
1	Steve Clisby	74	"Magic"	Team Full	✔	Team Full	✔
2	Lucy Griffiths	16	"Do You Really Want to Hurt Me"	Team Full	Team Full	Team Full	—
3	Mason Lloyde	28	"Take On Me"	Team Full	Team Full	Team Full	✔
4	Kat Jade	30	"If I Were a Boy"	Team Full	Team Full	Team Full	—
5	Wolf Winters*	32	"The Sound of Silence"	✔	Team Full	Team Full	—
6	Penelope Pettigrew	31	"Alive"	Team Full	Team Full	Team Full	—
7	Sapphire Tamalemai	16	"Runnin' (Lose It All)"	Team Full	Team Full	Team Full	✔

- Guy turned his chair for Wolf Winters despite already having a full team. Producers allowed him to keep Wolf as the 13th member of his team with the condition of losing two artists in a three-way battle in the next round.

== Battle rounds ==
The Battle rounds started on 21 June. The coaches can save two losing artists from any team, including their own. Contestants who win their battle or are saved will advance to the playoffs.

Season nine battle rounds colour key
Artist won the Battle and advanced to the playoffs
Artist lost the Battle but was saved by their coach or another coach, and advanced to the playoffs
Artist lost the Battle and was originally eliminated, however, received the Coach Comeback, advancing to the playoffs
Artist lost the Battle and was eliminated

Season nine battle rounds
Episode	Coach	Order	Winner	Song	Loser	'Save' result			
Episode	Coach	Order	Winner	Song	Loser	Guy	Delta	George	Kelly
Episode 11 (Sunday, June. 21, 2020)	Boy George	1	Virginia Lillye	"Call Me"	Clarissa Spata	–	✔	✔	–
Episode 11 (Sunday, June. 21, 2020)	Delta Goodrem	2	Graeme Isaako	"Dirrty"	Elishia Semaan	–	–	–	✔
Episode 11 (Sunday, June. 21, 2020)	Kelly Rowland	3	Alex Weybury	"The Best"	Mason Lloyde	–	–	–	–
Episode 11 (Sunday, June. 21, 2020)	Guy Sebastian	4	Stephanie Cole	"Scared to Be Lonely"	Kirby Burgess	–	–	–	–
Episode 11 (Sunday, June. 21, 2020)	Kelly Rowland	5	Lyric McFarland	"Rehab"	Soma Sutton	✔	–	–	–
Episode 11 (Sunday, June. 21, 2020)	Guy Sebastian	6	Johnny Manuel	"Earth Song"	Bukhu Ganburged	–	–	–	–
Episode 12 (Monday, June 22, 2020)	Boy George	1	Siala Robson	"Teenage Fantasy"	Despina Savva	–	–	✔	✔
Episode 12 (Monday, June 22, 2020)	Delta Goodrem	2	Claudia Harrison	"Dreams"	Maddy Thomas	–	–	–	Team full
Episode 12 (Monday, June 22, 2020)	Guy Sebastian	3	Wolf Winters	"Old Town Road"	Natalie Gauci	–	–	–	Team full
Episode 12 (Monday, June 22, 2020)	Guy Sebastian	3	Wolf Winters	"Old Town Road"	Xy Latu	–	–	–	Team full
Episode 12 (Monday, June 22, 2020)	Boy George	4	Roxane LeBrasse	"Queen of the Night"	Ricky Muscat	–	–	–	Team full
Episode 12 (Monday, June 22, 2020)	Kelly Rowland	5	Bo'Ness	"Circles"	Charlie McFarlane	–	–	–	Team full
Episode 12 (Monday, June 22, 2020)	Delta Goodrem	6	Stellar Perry	"Slide Away"	Matt Gresham	✔	–	–	Team full
Episode 13 (Sunday, June 28, 2020)	Kelly Rowland	1	Chris Sebastian	"Titanium"	Sapphire Tamalemai	Team full	–	✔	Team full
Episode 13 (Sunday, June 28, 2020)	Boy George	2	Caleb Jago-Ward	"Bohemian Rhapsody"	Andy Dexterity	Team full	–	–	Team full
Episode 13 (Sunday, June 28, 2020)	Delta Goodrem	3	Jesse Teinaki	"Human"	Steve Clisby	Team full	✔	–	Team full
Episode 13 (Sunday, June 28, 2020)	Boy George	4	Angela Fabian	"Stand by Me"	Jonathon Welch	Team full	Team full	–	Team full
Episode 13 (Sunday, June 28, 2020)	Guy Sebastian	5	Josh Pywell	"Love Is a Battlefield"	Jimi the Kween	Team full	Team full	–	Team full
Episode 13 (Sunday, June 28, 2020)	Delta Goodrem	6	Janie Gordon*	"Lover"	N/A	Team full	Team full	N/A	Team full
Episode 13 (Sunday, June 28, 2020)	Delta Goodrem	6	Matt Evans*	"Lover"	N/A	Team full	Team full	N/A	Team full
Episode 14 (Monday, June 29, 2020)	Kelly Rowland	1	Mark Furze	"You Oughta Know"	Emma Mylott	Team full	Team full	–	Team full
Episode 14 (Monday, June 29, 2020)	Delta Goodrem	2	Emmagen Rain	"Footloose"	Callum Gleeson	Team full	Team full	–	Team full
Episode 14 (Monday, June 29, 2020)	Guy Sebastian	3	Timothy Bowen	"It Must Have Been Love"	Luke Biscan	Team full	Team full	–	Team full
Episode 14 (Monday, June 29, 2020)	Boy George	4	Nathan Isaac	"Physical"	Sebastian Coe	Team full	Team full	–	Team full
Episode 14 (Monday, June 29, 2020)	Kelly Rowland	5	Ella Monnery	"Respect"	Masha Mnjoyan	Team full	Team full	✔	Team full
Episode 14 (Monday, June 29, 2020)	Guy Sebastian	6	Adam Ludewig	"Wrecking Ball"	Elyse Sene-Lefao	Team full	Team full	Team full	Team full

- Delta could not decide on a winner between Janie and Matt. With approval from the producers, she suggested they become a duo, and both artists agreed. The duo adopted the stage name "Goldi".

== Playoffs ==
The Playoffs started on 5 July. In the Playoffs, each coach pairs two of their artists together, with each artist singing an individual song following a theme. After all of their team's playoffs were done, the coaches chose one of their losing artists as a wildcard. The top 20 contestants who win their Playoff or are chosen as a Wildcard move on to the Showdowns. Due to COVID-19 and travel restrictions, Kelly and George mentored their artists remotely, with Marcia Hines and The Veronicas filling in as guest mentors respectively. Artists Caleb Jago-Ward from Team George and Ella Monnery from Team Kelly were unable to continue on the competition also due to travel restrictions, being stuck in New Zealand. Coaches George and Kelly were allowed to bring back an eliminated Battle loser to fill in for Caleb and Ella, George choosing Elyse Sene-Lefao and Kelly chose Jimi the Kween.

Season nine playoffs color key
Artist won the Playoff and advanced to the Showdowns
Artist lost the Playoff but was chosen as a wildcard and advanced to the Showdowns
Artist lost the Playoff and was eliminated

=== Episode 15 (5 July) ===
Episode 15 playoffs
Order	Coach	Theme	Winner		Loser	
Order	Coach	Theme	Artist	Song	Artist	Song
1	Delta	Romeo + Juliet	Clarissa Spata	"O Verona" x "O Fortuna"	Graeme Isaako	"Kissing You"
2	Guy	The Weeknd	Adam Ludewig	"Call Out My Name"	Josh Pywell	"Blinding Lights"
3	Kelly	Playlist Switch	Alex Weybury	"Issues”	Despina Savva	"Bette Davis Eyes"
4	George	Same Song	Masha Mnjoyan	"I Have Nothing"	Elyse Sene-Lefao	"I Have Nothing"
5	Guy	Tones and I	Johnny Manuel	“Forever Young"	Wolf Winters	"Dance Monkey"
6	George	David Bowie	Siala Robson	“Fame ’90”	Nathan Isaac	"Let's Dance”

=== Episode 16 (6 July) ===
Episode 16 playoffs
Order	Coach	Theme	Winner		Loser	
Order	Coach	Theme	Artist	Song	Artist	Song
1	George	Tina Turner	Angela Fabian	“River Deep – Mountain High”	Roxane LeBrasse	"What's Love Got to Do with It”
2	Kelly	American Rock	Mark Furze	"Dream On”	Bo'Ness	“Take It Easy”
3	Delta	Flume	Goldi	"Never Be like You"	Claudia Harrison	"Rushing Back"
4	Guy	Dean Lewis	Timothy Bowen	"Used to Love"	Matt Gresham	"Half a Man"
5	Kelly	N/A	N/A		Elishia Semaan*	"Cry Me a River"
5	Kelly	N/A	N/A		Jimi the Kween*	"I'm Coming Out"
6	Delta	Billie Eilish	Jesse Teinaki	"Everything I Wanted"	Stellar Perry	"I Love You"

- Kelly opted to take neither Elishia nor Jimi to the Showdowns, with approval from the producers. To even out her team, Kelly was granted an extra wildcard pick.

=== Episode 17 (7 July) ===
Episode 17 playoffs
Order	Coach	Theme	Winner		Loser	
Order	Coach	Theme	Artist	Song	Artist	Song
1	Delta	Australia	Steve Clisby	“I Still Call Australia Home”	Emmagen Rain	"Not Pretty Enough”
2	George	Sia	Virginia Lillye	"Chandelier”	Sapphire Tamalemai	“Breathe Me”
3	Guy	'90s	Stephanie Cole	“Show Me Love”	Soma Sutton	"The Boy Is Mine”
4	Kelly	Bruno Mars	Chris Sebastian	“24K Magic”	Lyric McFarland	"Grenade”

- Guest mentors The Veronicas performed their latest single "Biting My Tongue".

== Grand finale week ==
=== Showdowns ===
The Showdowns were first broadcast on 12 and 13 July 2020. Over the two episodes, all artists of the Top 20 take on a solo performance of a song of their choice. Teams Kelly and Guy performing on the first night, with Teams Delta and George performing on the second night. At the end of each episode, the coaches choose two out of their five artists to advance to the Semifinals.

Episode 18 showdown
Order	Coach	Contestant	Song	Result
1	Kelly	Mark Furze	"Are You Gonna Go My Way"	Saved by coach
2	Guy	Timothy Bowen	"The Chain"	Saved by coach
3	Kelly	Chris Sebastian	"Attention"	Saved by coach
4	Guy	Stephanie Cole	"You Say"	Eliminated
5	Guy	Adam Ludewig	"Someone You Loved"	Eliminated
6	Kelly	Lyric McFarland	"Can You Feel It"	Eliminated
7	Guy	Matt Gresham	"Who Am I Now" (Original)	Eliminated
8	Kelly	Despina Savva	"Bellyache"	Eliminated
9	Kelly	Alex Weybury	"Drops of Jupiter"	Eliminated
10	Guy	Johnny Manuel	"Before I Go"	Saved by coach

Episode 19 showdown
Order	Coach	Contestant	Song	Result
1	George	Elyse Sene-Lefao	"Freedom"	Eliminated
2	Delta	Clarissa Spata	"Uprising"	Eliminated
3	George	Angela Fabian	"I Still Haven't Found What I'm Looking For"	Eliminated
4	Delta	Goldi	"Dreams"	Eliminated
5	George	Masha Mnjoyan	"Chains"	Saved by coach
6	Delta	Steve Clisby	"Only Love Can Hurt Like This"	Eliminated
7	George	Virginia Lillye	"Tightrope"	Eliminated
8	Delta	Jesse Teinaki	"Make It Rain"	Saved by coach
9	George	Siala Robson	"Emotional Criminal" (Original)	Saved by coach
10	Delta	Stellar Perry	"Like a Prayer"	Saved by coach

Non-competition performances
Order	Performer(s)	Song
18.1	Delta Goodrem and the Top 20	"Keep Climbing"
19.1	Amy Shark	"Everybody Rise"

=== Semi-finals ===
The Semi-finals episode was first broadcast on 14 July 2020. At the end of the episode, the coaches were allowed to take one artist each through to the Grand Finale due to the COVID-19 pandemic. The only other time this occurred was in season 1. This also marks Guy Sebastian's first season with an artist in the Grand Finale.

Episode 20 Semi-final
Order	Coach	Contestant	Song	Result
1	George	Masha Mnjoyan	"Rain on Me"	Eliminated
2	Delta	Jesse Teinaki	"Cellophane"	Eliminated
3	Kelly	Mark Furze	"Youngblood"	Eliminated
4	George	Siala Robson	"Where Is The Love?"	Saved by coach
5	Guy	Timothy Bowen	"Reason To Live" (Original)	Eliminated
6	Kelly	Chris Sebastian	"Before You Go"	Saved by coach
7	Delta	Stellar Perry	"Believe"	Saved by coach
8	Guy	Johnny Manuel	"A Change Is Gonna Come"	Saved by coach

Non-competition performances
Order	Performer	Song
20.1	Daryl Braithwaite	"Love Songs"
20.2	Guy Sebastian	"Standing with You"

=== Grand Finale ===
The Grand Finale was first broadcast on 19 July 2020. Each artist performed a solo song and a duet with their coach, or a guest singer. This was the only episode of the season where the results were determined by public vote and not by the coaches.

Solo performances
Order	Coach	Contestant	Song	Result
2	Kelly	Chris Sebastian	"Numb" by Linkin Park	Winner
5	George	Siala Robson	"God Is a Woman" by Ariana Grande	Runner-Up
6	Guy	Johnny Manuel	"My Heart Will Go On" by Céline Dion	Third place
8	Delta	Stellar Perry	"Anyone" by Demi Lovato	Fourth place

Duet performances
Order	Duet performers		Song
Order	Coach	Contestant	Song
1	George	Siala Robson	"Untouched" by The Veronicas (with The Veronicas)
3	Delta	Stellar Perry	"Running Up That Hill" by Kate Bush
4	Guy	Johnny Manuel	"Black and Gold" by Sam Sparro
7	Kelly	Chris Sebastian	"Horses" by Daryl Braithwaite (with Daryl Braithwaite)

- Due to COVID-19 travel restrictions, Boy George and Kelly could not perform with their artists, so Boy George had The Veronicas sing with Siala, while Kelly had Daryl Braithwaite sing with Chris.

== Grand finale week results ==
=== Colour key ===
==== Artist's info ====
- Artist from Team Guy
- Artist from Team Delta
- Artist from Team George
- Artist from Team Kelly

==== Result details ====
- Winner
- Runner-Up
- Third place
- Fourth place
- Artist was saved by the coach
- Artist was eliminated by coach

=== Overall ===
Live Shows results per week
Artist	Week 1		Grand Finale
Artist	Showdowns	Semi-Final	Grand Finale
Chris Sebastian	Safe	Safe	Winner
Siala Robson	Safe	Safe	Runner-Up
Johnny Manuel	Safe	Safe	Third place
Stellar Perry	Safe	Safe	Fourth place
Jesse Teinaki	Safe	Eliminated	Eliminated (Semi-final)
Mark Furze	Safe	Eliminated	Eliminated (Semi-final)
Masha Mnjoyan	Safe	Eliminated	Eliminated (Semi-final)
Timothy Bowen	Safe	Eliminated	Eliminated (Semi-final)
Adam Ludewig	Eliminated	Eliminated (Showdowns)	
Alex Weybury	Eliminated	Eliminated (Showdowns)	
Angela Fabian	Eliminated	Eliminated (Showdowns)	
Clarissa Spata	Eliminated	Eliminated (Showdowns)	
Despina Savva	Eliminated	Eliminated (Showdowns)	
Elyse Sene-Lefao	Eliminated	Eliminated (Showdowns)	
Goldi	Eliminated	Eliminated (Showdowns)	
Lyric McFarland	Eliminated	Eliminated (Showdowns)	
Matt Gresham	Eliminated	Eliminated (Showdowns)	
Stephanie Cole	Eliminated	Eliminated (Showdowns)	
Steve Clisby	Eliminated	Eliminated (Showdowns)	
Virginia Lillye	Eliminated	Eliminated (Showdowns)	

=== Team ===
The Finals results per week
Artist	Week 1		Grand Finale
Artist	Showdowns	Semi-Final	Grand Finale
Johnny Manuel	Safe	Safe	Third place
Timothy Bowen	Safe	Eliminated	
Adam Ludewig	Eliminated		
Matt Gresham	Eliminated		
Stephanie Cole	Eliminated		
Stellar Perry	Safe	Safe	Fourth place
Jesse Teinaki	Safe	Eliminated	
Clarissa Spata	Eliminated		
Goldi	Eliminated		
Steve Clisby	Eliminated		
Siala Robson	Safe	Safe	Runner-Up
Masha Mnjoyan	Safe	Eliminated	
Angela Fabian	Eliminated		
Elyse Sene-Lefao	Eliminated		
Virginia Lillye	Eliminated		
Chris Sebastian	Safe	Safe	Winner
Mark Furze	Safe	Eliminated	
Alex Weybury	Eliminated		
Despina Savva	Eliminated		
Lyric McFarland	Eliminated		

== Contestants who appeared on previous season or TV shows ==
- Roxane LeBrasse was on the third season of Australian Idol and placed in ninth.
- Virginia Lillye auditioned for season 1 of the show, with no chairs turned.
- Jon Wiza was a finalist on The Voice Colombia (La Voz Colombia)
- Chris Sebastian competed on season 1 of the show and was eliminated in the quarter-finals.
- Jesse Teinaki competed on the show's previous season where he was mentored by Guy then Delta, and was eliminated in the battle rounds. Also, he auditioned for the sixth season of The X Factor in 2014, but didn't make the Live Shows.
- Sebastian Coe competed for The Voice Kids and was eliminated in the battle rounds.
- Matt Gresham competed in season 4 of The X Factor and made it to the top 24. He also returned in season 5 of The X Factor but withdrew after making the top 24.
- Masha Mnjoyan was the winner of the first season of The Voice of Armenia
- Caleb Jago-Ward competed on season 4 of the show where he was mentored by Delta, and was eliminated in the semi-finals.
- Elishia Semaan auditioned for season 6 and season 8 of The X Factor part of BEATZ, and didn't make it into the lives shows of the sixth season. However, was eliminated in the eighth season at the semi-finals.
- Natalie Gauci was the winner of the fifth season of Australian Idol.
- Lyric McFarland competed on season 2 of the show, and was eliminated in the showdown rounds.
- Johnny Manuel competed on season 12 of America's Got Talent and was eliminated in the semi-finals. He also was in the Eurovision Song Contest 2018 in the band Equinox
- Mark Furze played Ric Dalby on Home and Away
- Elyse Sene-Lefao auditioned for season 8 of the show, with no chairs turned, and the audition wasn't aired.
- Steve Clisby competed on season 2 of the show where he was mentored by Seal then Delta, and was eliminated in the semi-finals.
- Kat Jade competed on season 3 of the show where she was mentored by Kylie Minogue, and made it to the top 8.

== Ratings ==
Colour key:

– Highest rating during the season
– Lowest rating during the season

The Voice season nine consolidated viewership and adjusted position
Episode		Original airdate	Timeslot	Viewers (millions)	Night Rank	Source
1	"The Blind Auditions"	24 May 2020	Sunday 7:00 pm	1.082	3	
2	"The Blind Auditions"	25 May 2020	Monday 7:30 pm	1.012	5	
3	"The Blind Auditions"	26 May 2020	Tuesday 7:30 pm	1.058	5	
4	"The Blind Auditions"	31 May 2020	Sunday 7:00 pm	1.098	3	
5	"The Blind Auditions"	1 June 2020	Monday 7:30 pm	1.037	5	
6	"The Blind Auditions"	2 June 2020	Tuesday 7:30 pm	1.017	4	
7	"The Blind Auditions"	7 June 2020	Sunday 7:00 pm	0.957	3	
8	"The Blind Auditions"	8 June 2020	Monday 7:30 pm	0.927	7	
9	"The Blind Auditions"	14 June 2020	Sunday 7:00 pm	0.991	4	
10	"The Blind Auditions"	15 June 2020	Monday 7:30 pm	1.011	5	
11	"The Battle Rounds"	21 June 2020	Sunday 7:00 pm	0.962	4	
12	"The Battle Rounds"	22 June 2020	Monday 7:30 pm	0.936	6	
13	"The Battle Rounds"	28 June 2020	Sunday 7:00 pm	0.923	4	
14	"The Battle Rounds"	29 June 2020	Monday 7:30 pm	0.850	8	
15	"The play-offs"	5 July 2020	Sunday 7:00 pm	0.894	4	
16	"The play-offs"	6 July 2020	Monday 7:30 pm	0.842	7	
17	"The play-offs"	7 July 2020	Tuesday 7:30 pm	0.778	9	
18	"The Showdowns"	12 July 2020	Sunday 7:00 pm	0.799	6	
19	"The Showdowns"	13 July 2020	Monday 7:30 pm	0.794	9	
20	"The Semi-Finals"	14 July 2020	Tuesday 7:30 pm	0.798	8	
21	"The Grand Finale"	19 July 2020	Sunday 7:00 pm	0.938	5	
