= Paul Burnham =

Cricket Lover/Business Owner/Investor from Sunbury-On-Thames, England

Paul Lawrence Burnham (born 1964 or 1965) is a cricket supporter from Twickenham, London, England. He is one of the founding members and the current Chairman of the Barmy Army of supporters of the England cricket team.

== Personal life ==
Burnham was educated at Hampton School. Burnham gained a sports and business degree in 1984 while working for British Airways in their cargo division. He also captained the British Airways 1st XI cricket team in winning the Bertie Joel Cup, a prestigious cricket tournament at club level, where he was man of the match. He has represented various cricket teams and played in cricket tournaments of varying formats globally He has played cricket for Old Hamptonians.

== Barmy Army ==
In 1994, Burnham travelled to Australia to watch The Ashes. There he met a number of other English supporters who were noted for singing songs, despite England losing. They received press attention which was positive in Australia but negative in the British press. Burnham then trademarked the name "Barmy Army" in the United Kingdom and Australia and created a number of replica shirts with it on them which sold out.

After the Ashes, Burnham started running the Barmy Army on a part-time basis while supplementing his income by working as a bookmaker and writing for various cricket magazines. In 1997, he negotiated the Barmy Army's first sponsorship deal with Vodafone to support the Barmy Army's tour of the West Indies. He started working for the Barmy Army full-time in 2002 as the organizer after creating a website and travel agency for them. Burnham also set up the Barmy Army's operations office in Sunbury-on-Thames. Burnham has also been involved in charity fundraisers.
