= Billy Cooper (trumpeter) =

Cricket supporter

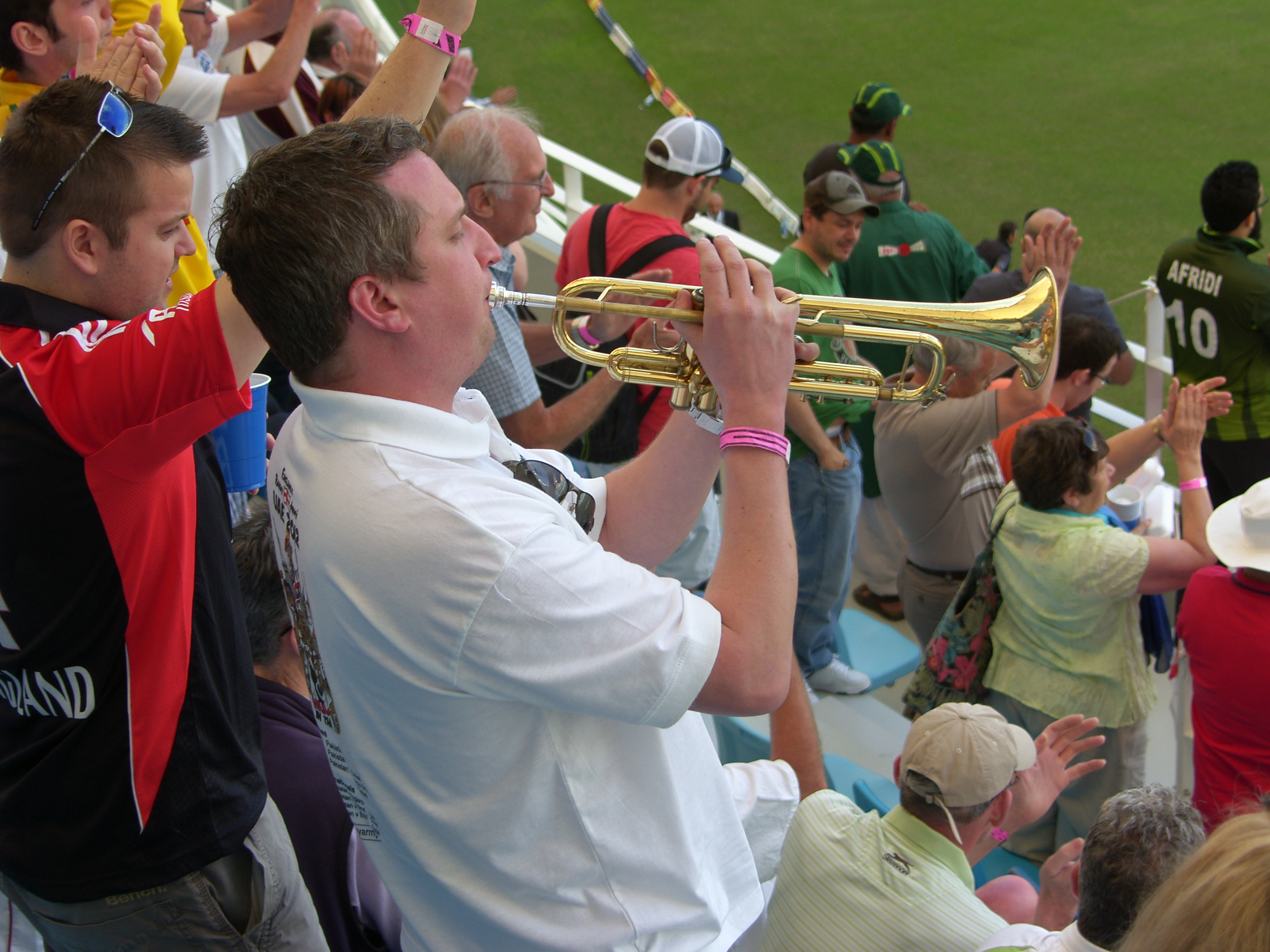
- Cooper in 2012
- Education: Guildhall School of Music and Drama
- Occupation: Musician
- Known for: Trumpet player for Barmy Army

Billy Cooper, also known as Billy The Trumpet, is a cricket supporter best known as the trumpet player for the Barmy Army.

== Career ==
Cooper was educated at Guildhall School of Music and Drama. He has a Bachelor of Music honours degree and a performer's diploma from the Royal Academy of Music, and plays as a guest trumpeter with several orchestras including the London Symphony Orchestra and new music specialists Klangforum Wien, as well as in West End musicals.

== Barmy Army ==
Cooper became involved with the Barmy Army in 2004 after following England on a tour of the West Indies and accidentally leaving his trumpet in a taxi in Barbados. It was later discovered by someone in the Barmy Army who was also at the same game Cooper was going to. When Cooper asked for it to be returned, the person asked for him to prove it was his by playing it. Cooper then played The Great Escape theme tune, which led to some of the Barmy Army offering to pay his air fare if he would join them on England's tour of South Africa.

At matches Cooper usually plays theme tunes from popular television programmes such as the theme tunes from Blackadder, Only Fools and Horses, and Coronation Street. Cooper also plays songs such as "The Lion Sleeps Tonight" and "YMCA".

During the 2010–11 Ashes series, Cooper played Jerusalem from the top of the Sydney Harbour Bridge early in the morning of the last Test game of the series. During the last delivery of the Ashes series, Cooper played The Last Post.

Cooper also plays tunes appropriate to a particular passage of play. For example, during England's 2013 tour of New Zealand, he would play a passage of Wagner whenever the New Zealand fast bowler Neil Wagner began a spell of bowling.

In January 2020, he announced his retirement from touring matches after the South Africa tour.

== Controversies ==
Cooper's actions have sometimes led him into trouble. In 2006, Cooper was thrown out of the Gabba and arrested for playing the Neighbours theme tune on his trumpet during the 2006–07 Ashes series due to playing a "banned musical instrument". However, in 2010, Cricket Australia gave Cooper special dispensation to be the only person allowed into the Gabba with a musical instrument.

In 2009, he was banned from attending a Test match at Headingley along with Barmy Army leader Vic Flowers for potentially being a distraction to people watching matches according to the operators of Headingley. He was not permitted to enter Trent Bridge during the 2013 or 2015 Ashes series due to a stadium ban on musical instruments.
