= Bharat Army =

Indian national cricket team fan group

The Bharat Army is a group of Indian cricket fans supporting the Indian national cricket team in both domestic and international matches. It is considered the Indian equivalent of the Barmy Army.

== History ==
The Bharat Army was established in 1999 by Rakesh Patel in Manchester, England. Initially formed with four members, the group has grown to over 160,000 registered members globally. The group's formation aimed to create a dedicated supporters' group for the Indian cricket team.

In 2002, Patel's significant moment came when he met Indian cricketer, Rahul Dravid.

In 2018, the Bharat Army gained recognition from the Board of Control for Cricket in India (BCCI), following India's test match victory against Australia national cricket team in Australia, where they were invited to celebrate with the Indian cricket team.

During the 2019 Cricket World Cup, around 11,000 Bharat Army fans from 23 countries traveled to England and Wales to support the Indian team. In 2023, prior to a match at the MA Chidambaram Stadium, the group held an event in Chennai, drawing over 250 supporters from various regions, including the United States, Singapore, Hong Kong, the UK, Australia, and Europe.

== Members ==
Rakesh Patel and the core members of the Bharat Army are British nationals, but their support is for the Indian cricket team. This has occasionally led to interactions with the Barmy Army, a similar group for England cricket team.

== Music ==
The Bharat Army is known for using musical instruments like drums, saxophones, trumpets, and dhols to enhance their support during cricket matches.
