= Chris Sebastian =

Australian musician (born 1988)

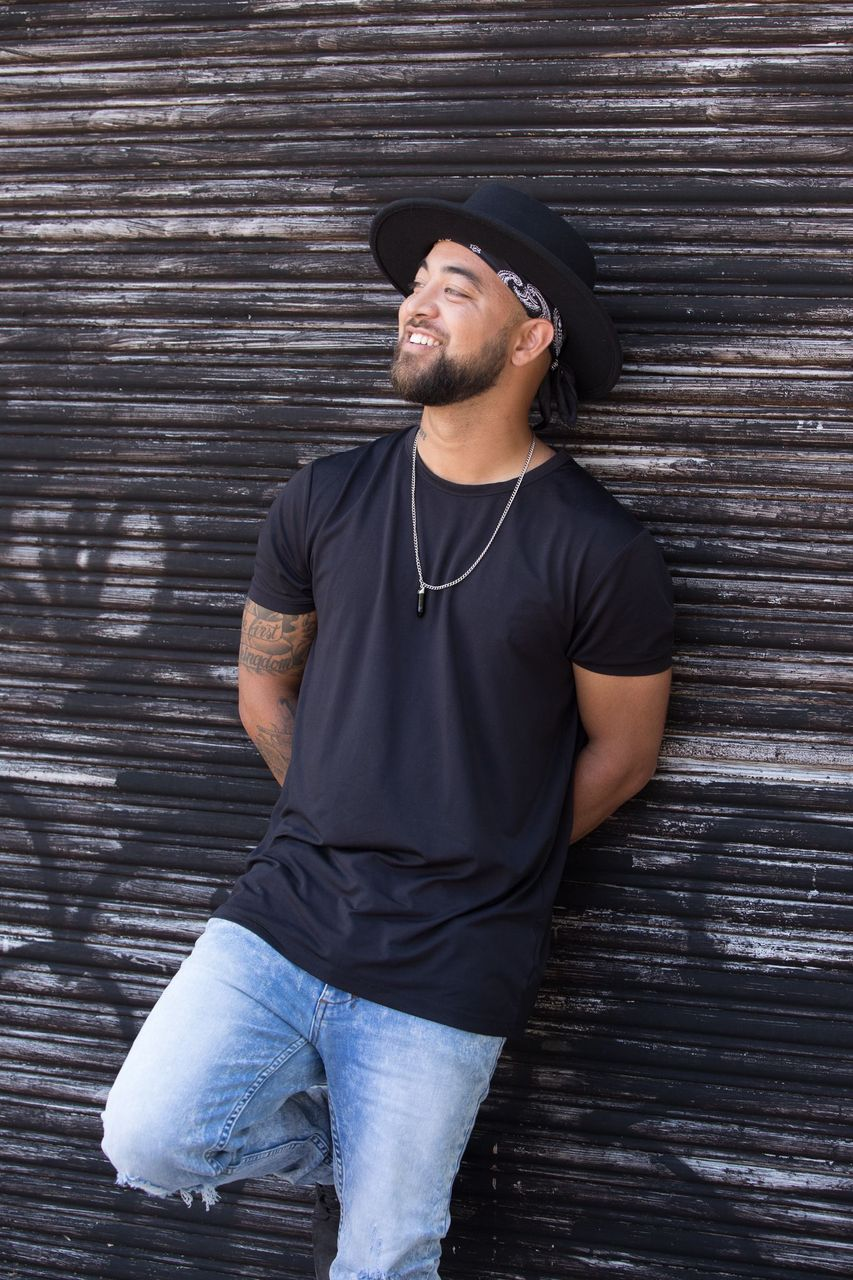

Background information
- Born: Christopher Troy Sebastian; 2 August 1988 (age 38)
- Genres: Pop, R&B
- Instruments: Vocals, piano
- Labels: (2014–2015), EMI Music (2020)
- Spouse: Natashia Sebastian
- Website: chrissebastian.com.au

Christopher Troy Sebastian (born 2 August 1988) is an Australian singer and songwriter. In 2012, Sebastian took part in the 1st season of The Voice Australia and was a member of Team Seal, but was eliminated in the quarter-finals. He returned to The Voice Australia in the 9th season and joined Kelly Rowland's team winning the title in July 2020.

== Career ==
=== 2008–2011: Career beginnings and "Flow" ===
Sebastian moved from Adelaide, South Australia to Melbourne in 2008 to further his music career, where he worked as a singing teacher and producer. In July 2011, he released his debut single "Flow". auspOp described the song as a "likeable R&B/pop track that is as fresh as a summer breeze, combining cool harmonies with lashings of old school soul."

=== 2012: The Voice season one ===
In 2012, Sebastian auditioned for the 1st season of The Voice Australia. He received chair turns from Delta Goodrem and Seal, opting to join Team Seal. Sebastian progressed to the top 16, before being eliminated from the competition.

The Voice performances and results (2012)
Episode	Song	Original Artist	Result
Audition	"Halo"	Beyoncé	Through to Battle Rounds
Battle Rounds	"Firework" (vs Yshrael Pascual)	Katy Perry	Through to Live Shows
Live Shows	"Without You"	David Guetta ft. Usher	Saved by Coach. Through to quarter finals
Quarter-finals	"I Can't Stand the Rain"	Ann Peebles	Eliminated

In a later interview, Sebastian revealed "I really didn't want to [do the show]... They did a lot of things that they weren't meant to, like after my performance they played my brother's song. And the whole point was for me to have my own identity... So it was a bit of a crappy experience."

=== 2013–2019: Independent career ===
In 2016, Sebastian toured with American vocal group Pentatonix and began work on his debut EP in Los Angeles.

On 20 October 2016, Sebastian released his debut EP Runaway. Sebastian said "My old manager had me doing the whole dance/R&B/David Guetta stuff and look, it was fun, but I didn't enjoy it. I would never play those songs at gigs... Obviously as an artist you want to enjoy playing your songs live and I didn't... I changed the way that I wrote – it's a lot more acoustic, I guess if Ed Sheeran met Ne-Yo, that's kinda the sound I'm going for." The EP was supported with a national tour in late 2016.

His second EP was This Christmas in 2018.

=== 2020: The Voice season 9 ===
In 2020, Sebastian returned and auditioned for season 9 of The Voice Australia as an All Star. All four judges turned for his blind audition and he chose Team Kelly Rowland. He was announced the winner on 19 July 2020, beating Stellar Perry, Johnny Manuel and Siala Robson in a public vote, scoring $100,000 and a recording contract with EMI Music.

denotes winner.

The Voice performances and results (2020)
Episode	Song	Original Artist	Result
Audition	"Jealous"	Labrinth	Through to Battle Rounds
Battle Rounds	"Titanium" (vs Sapphire Tamalemai)	David Guetta and Sia	Through to The play-offs
The play-offs	"24K Magic"	Bruno Mars	Through to Show Downs
Show Downs	"Attention"	Charlie Puth	Saved by Coach. Through to semi-final
Semi-final	"Before You Go"	Lewis Capaldi	Saved by Coach. Through to final
Grand Final	"Numb"	Linkin Park	Winner
Grand Final	"The Horses" (with Daryl Braithwaite)	Rickie Lee Jones	Winner

Immediately following the announcement of his win, Sebastian's debut single with EMI Music "Bed for Two" was released.

Upset viewers accused the TV singing contest of being "rigged", because Sebastian's brother Guy Sebastian had been one of the show's judges. Sebastian denied receiving any preferential treatment, and said, as Guy's brother, he'd anticipated "negativity" going into the show. Sebastian said "Controversy is just part of being on television. I knew it was going to be a thing on this show, but I don't care. It's a voted show, it's audited, it couldn't be more above board. More people voted for me than are slamming me, so I'm going to focus on those people." A Nine Network spokesperson said: "The public vote for The Voice winner is highly regulated, operated by an independent third party, and overseen by lawyers. This year's result is the tightest ever, with less than half a percent of the votes separating the winner and runner-up."

Sebastian's 2019 single "I Found You" debuted at number 8 on the Australian Independent chart for the week commencing 27 July 2020.

=== 2021: "Hard to Get to Love" and "Wasted On Me" ===
In March 2021, Sebastian released "Hard to Get to Love", followed by "Wasted On Me" in July 2021.

== Personal life ==
Chris Sebastian attended King's Baptist Grammar School while growing up in Adelaide. He has three brothers, Olly, Guy and Jeremy. His brother Guy Sebastian is also a musical artist.

Sebastian is married to Natashia Sebastian. The pair suffered a miscarriage at the start of her second trimester in 2018. They have one child, Ava (born March 2020).

== Discography ==
=== Extended plays ===
List of EPs, with release date, label, and selected chart positions shown
Title	Details	Peak chart positions
Title	Details	AUS
Runaway	Released: 20 October 2016; Label: Chris Sebastian; Formats: Digital download, streaming	—
This Christmas	Released: 12 December 2018; Label: Chris Sebastian; Formats: Digital download, streaming	—
The Complete Collection	Released: 19 July 2020; Label: Universal Australia; Formats: Digital download, streaming	52

=== Singles ===
List of singles, with year released, album details, and selected chart positions shown
Title	Year	Peak chart positions	Album
Title	Year	AUS Indie	Album
"Flow"	2011	—	Non-album singles
"Everything"	2013	—	Non-album singles
"Runaway"	2016	—	Runaway
"Hey (Na Na)" (with DL)	2017	—	Non-album single
"This Christmas"	2018	—	This Christmas
"I Found You"	2019	8	Non-album singles
"Take Me Back"	2020	—	Non-album singles
"Soon"	2020	—	Non-album singles
"Bed for 2"	2020	—	The Complete Collection
"Hard to Get to Love"	2021	—	TBA
"Wasted On Me"	2021	—	TBA

Preceded by Diana Rouvas	The Voice winner 2020	Succeeded by Bella Taylor Smith
