= One Wiza =

Colombian rock musician, singer, actor, multi-instrumentalist, and music producer

Juan Manuel Güiza
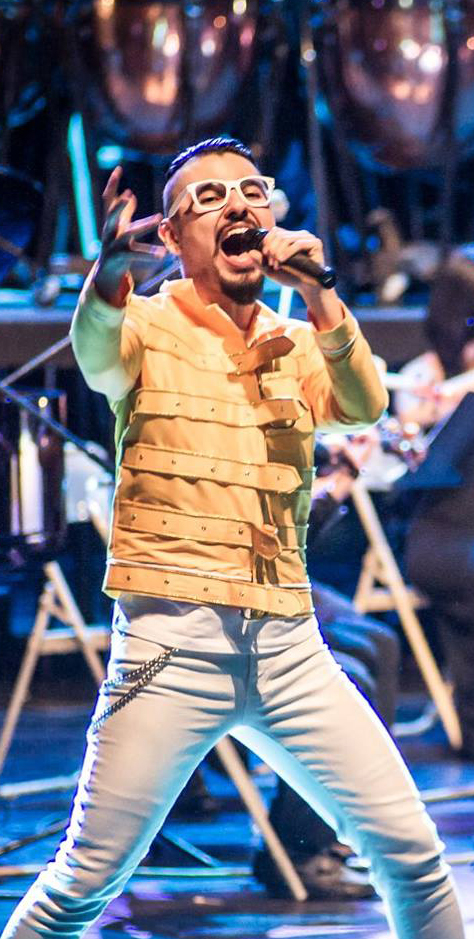
- Juan Guiza performing at the National Theater of Guatemala in September 2016
- Born: Juan Manuel Güiza Cerón; May 10, 1991 (age 35); Villavicencio, Colombia
- Occupations: Singer; guitarist; composer; music producer; actor
- Years active: 2005–present
- Website: onewiza.com

Juan Manuel Güiza Cerón (Latin American Spanish: [ˈxwam maˈnwel ˈɣwisa seˈɾon]; born May 10, 1991), known professionally as One Wiza (/ˈwaɪzə/ WY-zə) and formerly as One in Guatemala, is a Colombian rock musician, singer, actor, multi-instrumentalist, and music producer. Born in Villavicencio, Colombia, he is most notable for being a finalist in the reality TV show La Voz Colombia (The Voice) season 2 on Caracol TV, and for being the lead singer of The One Man Band, a prominent Rock band from Guatemala City.

Wiza has also shared the stage with some of the most prominent Latin American acts from all around the world, including Enanitos Verdes from Argentina, Hombres G from Spain Chayanne from Puerto Rico, Timbiriche from Mexico and Fonseca from Colombia, amongst several others.

In 2019 Wiza was officially invited overseas by the National Symphony Orchestra of Guatemala to perform as a soloist and lead singer for their Symphonic Queen Tribute. He was also invited to Puerto Rico to perform this show in 2022. He's also notable for being invited as the soloist singer for other chamber orchestral shows, including the international Opera Queen theatrical show, the No Guns, More Roses symphonic theatrical show, and the Beatles International Day show in Guatemala.

As an actor, Wiza played Drew Boley, one of the lead characters from the hit Broadway Musical Rock of Ages.

Juan was also winner for the Hard Rock Cafe's 40th anniversary international singing competition, and a winner for the TV game show Atrévete a cantar (Who Dares, Sings!), aired on RCN TV network in Colombia.

Wiza has been a part of numerous notable musical projects in Colombia. He is the former singer of Colombian progressive metal band Entropia the "Orquesta Sinfónica del Rock" (Rock Symphonic Orchestra) of Bogota, and his own electronic-rock project Versaphonica. He is prominent as a vocalist and performing artist in Colombia, Guatemala, Ecuador and El Salvador.

== Early life ==
Wiza began his vocal studies in The New School University of New York City in 2002 and later in the El Bosque University in Bogota in 2004. He graduated as a Music Producer from the ENE Audio Institute in 2013. In 2014 he received a "Writing and Composition Scholarship Award", from the Berklee College of Music in Boston, however decided not to attend. He also took private vocal sessions with internationally renowned vocal coaches Melissa Cross in 2011 and Ron Anderson in 2013.

== Career ==
=== Early Career (2006–2010) ===
Juan was lead singer, composer and producer for Progressive metal band Entropia from 2006 until 2009. The band received significant recognition from various different media in Colombia, including News Papers El Tiempo, El Espectador, El Nuevo Siglo, and various different radio stations such as LaUD Stereo Radiónica, amongst others. Online Metal magazine, Metal Music Archives wrote:

“Calling Entropia one of the best, if not THE best, act coming from Colombia right now isn't at all far from the truth” … “Virtually everything about this band hints towards ‘prog metal veteran’ status”.

Wiza was the lead singer and producer for Entropia's first album "… of Human Introspection" in 2006. In 2008 he was lead singer, composer and producer for its second album Simetria, which received large exposition and was critically acclaimed worldwide. Honorary critics for Metal Music Archives gave the album 4 out of 5 stars, and wrote:

“I especially have to applaud Juan Manuel Güiza's vocals, which can handle falsettos like Ray Alder and breathtaking harmonies and delicacy like Daniel Gildenlöw”.

A different Honorary critic for the same magazine also wrote:

“One way that they show their own style is in the vocals. Juan Manuel Güiza is very talented vocally and I really like his style. Sometimes it reminds me of Road Salt One, modern-era Pain of Salvation mixed with a James Labrie type sound and other times it is just hard to explain, but I do like his tone, and quality of voice”.

In 2008, with Wiza on board as lead vocals, Entropia was selected to perform at Rock al Parque, the largest free outdoor music festival in Ibero America, the third largest in the world This same year, Entropia was selected to form part of an official Iron Maiden tribute album called "The Golden Beast", which was released by EMI Music. Wiza left Entropia in 2009. Regarding his departure, Metal critic "Quadrupleplay" wrote:

“A near legend in Colombia, such that after leaving Entropia almost nobody dares to replace him, Juan Manuel Güiza brings the catchy swagger that goes along with Entropia's exciting blend of technical, heavy and accessible elements. All about punch rather than crunch, Juan Manuel delivers vocals alternately in a high baritone, soaring falsetto and power singing.”.

=== TV Success and Solo Career (2010–2014) ===
Wiza started his own electronic rock project Versaphonica in late 2010. in 2011 Subterránica Online music Magazine called the band "an impeccable music proposal" and "an impressive technological musical journey". They performed in several different venues in Bogota, including the Hard Rock Cafe and the Ozzy Bar. Wiza disbanded the live band shortly after, due to lack of idoneous musicians for its musical and conceptual vision, however he continued the studio recordings as a solo producer.

In 2013 Wiza was a winner for the TV Singing competition "Atrevete a Cantar", aired by Mundo Fox and RCN TV, one of the largest TV networks in Colombia.

This same year, he was also a participant and finalist for La Voz Colombia (The Voice) on Caracol TV, one of the largest TV networks in Colombia. He was one of the 8 finalists for the Ricardo Montaner team. La Voz Colombia was aired on Caracol TV and was one of the most watched TV shows of the year. In 2014, La Voz Colombia was also aired in Ecuavisa, the largest TV Network in Ecuador.

During this period Wiza was also lead singer for the Orquesta Sinfónica del Rock of Bogota. They performed in various prominent venues in Colombia, including the 10th anniversary of the restaurant "Andres Carne de Res" in Medellin, and the Julio Mario Santo Domingo theater in Bogota. In 2013 they released they're first single "La Vida En Espiral". It was met with positive reviews. Regarding Wiza's vocals, Factor Metal Webzine wrote:

"… and the icing on the cake was the powerful and emotive interpretation of Juan Manuel Güiza, who added an equilibrium to the entire concept, between the softer and more calm sections, against those stronger and more energetic; showcasing his wide vocal register and impeccable technique."

Wiza left the Orquesta Sinfónica del Rock in 2014.

=== Guatemala, The One Man Band (2015 – Present) ===
In 2015 Wiza traveled to Los Angeles, CA to work with various music executives, and record with producer and Living Dead Lights drummer Nick Battani in Vision Red Studio.

Wiza relocated to Guatemala in 2016 where he formed the band "The One Man Band", named after his stage name "One". In early to mid-2016 The One Man Band became a notable act in Guatemala, after they won the privilege to perform in the International Beatles Day, a 7-year-old national tribute celebration held in honor of the famous British rock band: The Beatles.

The event was sponsored by the Embassy of the UK, the Embassy of Costa Rica; and took place in the Tikal Futura convention centre, one of the largest venues in Guatemala. The event was covered by most main mass media and TV networks, including Prensa Libre, Siglo 21, Publinews and Nuestro Diario News papers; and Guatevisión and Canal + TV Channels. Wiza was also invited as a spokesperson to a press conference held by the British Embassy of Guatemala, and held a two-hour radio interview for Mentes Frescas, RCN 94.9 Guatemalan radio station.

Wiza made his first appearance in Guatemalan TV in mid 2016, when he was invited to "Un Show con Tuti", a popular Guatemalan Talk Show aired on Guatevisión, Guatemala's main TV station. He was also invited for interview on "+ Beats", a music magazine on "Canal +". Wiza also performed in the Reality TV Show "Super Modelo Guatemala" of the same TV Network.

In October 2016, The One Man Band appeared in the "Mes de la Cerveza", one of the largest events of the year in Explanada Cayalá, Guatemala. The One Man Band was chosen to perform at the Guatemalan New Year's Eve party in Cayala, on December 31, 2016.

Wiza was interviewed in February 2017 in "Que Comience La Mañana", a morning talk show and magazine, to talk about his experiences as a Colombian artist living in Guatemala, as well as his achievements in this country. One Wiza was also invited to perform at the 13th Anniversary of "Viva La Mañana", a different morning news and culture magazine aired on Guatevisión.

On March 9, 2017, and March 14, 2017; One Wiza was invited to perform with his "The One Man Band" at the British Queen's Birthday Party in Guatemala. Ambassador Thomas Carter and Carolyn Davidson thanked One Wiza in their speech for helping to promote the British culture, and called him "Extremely Talented".

=== Opening act for International Rock Acts ===
Wiza and his "The One Man Band" were also chosen to be the opening act for international Colombian artist Fonseca on May 20, 2017. This same year they also performed as the opening act for Spaniard artist Rosana, a month later, on June 24, 2017. Both shows were held at the Forum Majadas auditorium and met great success.

In December 2017, once again One Wiza and his "The One Man Band" were the opening act for two of the most important rock bands of the Spanish rock genre: Enanitos Verdes from Argentina and Hombres G from Spain; the tour was called "Huevos Revueltos", and took place throughout the Americas. Two shows were held on the December 1 and 2, 2017 in Guatemala and were both sold out. He was also featured as the opening act for Latin Grammy Award-Nominee Fey and Latin pop band Kabah, on October 13 of the same year.

Timbiriche, considered one of the most iconic Latin Pop acts of the 1980s and the early 1990s, held a tour to celebrate 35 years of their musical career and history. One Wiza and his Band were chosen to be the opening act. The concert was packed with more than 6000 people, and was held at the Cardales de Cayalá fields in Guatemala.

On December the 12th 2019, Wiza was featured as the opening act for multiple Latin Grammy-nominee Chayanne, performing in front of more than 10000 people to a sold-out concert at Cardales de Cayala, Guatemala.

=== Symphonic Theatrical Shows – Orquesta Camerata Filarmónica of Puerto Rico, National Symphony Orchestra of Guatemala, Opera Queen and No Guns More Roses ===
In 2016, Wiza was called to be the lead singer for Opera Queen, a Symphony Chamber Orchestra tribute with more than 40 musicians on stage. The spectacle was performed in several venues, including the National Theater of Guatemala, the Centro Cultural Miguel Ángel Asturias, main chamber "Efraín Recinos": the country's most distinguished venue. Wiza and the Opera Queen Company traveled to perform at the El Salvador National Theater, the "Teatro Presidente", later in 2016.

Regarding the Opera Queen Show, El Diario de Hoy, newspaper of El Salvador, called One Wiza's vocal register "Idoneous for the show", and also reported that

"The singer (One Wiza) has a very large vocal registry, one that allows him to reach the notes to make a true homage to Queen".

In 2017 International NGO World Vision held a symphonic concert and a campaign with NiuMark Music, to raise awareness on violence against children in Guatemala. The concert was entitled "No Guns, More Roses", and was a symphonic tribute concert with more than 40 musicians on stage, playing original symphonic renditions of the North American Hard Rock band Guns N' Roses. It was played in conjunction with the "Sonidos de Esperanza" children symphonic orchestra from San Juan Sacátepequez, which is a part of the World Vision Foundation; and was held at the National Theater of Guatemala, the Centro Cultural Miguel Ángel Asturias, main chamber "Efraín Recinos": the most prominent of this country.

One Wiza was the lead and only singer for the show. During the performance, Guatemalan child pianist and sensation Yahaira Tubac, who was 7 years old at the time; performed the song "November Rain", arguably one of the most famous from the band. The show received major coverage from the media and was regarded as highly successful, so much that it even spawned an entire dedicated half-hour TV documentary especial on the TV show "A Fondo Sin Reservas" hosted by Haroldo Sánchez on Guatevisión. During the show, One Wiza is interviewed as the lead singer for the show, and can be seen throughout the entire documentary.

Regarding One Wiza's performance in "No Guns, More Roses", Eslly Melgarejo wrote for Guatevisión News:

"One Wiza (One) was responsible to bring life to the concert 'No Guns More Roses' with his voice, he was also acclaimed and applauded by the spectators present."

In 2019 Wiza received a formal letter of invitation from the National Symphony Orchestra of Guatemala, to perform as a soloist for the 6th concert of their extracurricular season: a symphonic tribute to the British Rock band Queen. Wiza was flown in from Australia to begin rehearsals in September 2019 in preparation for the concert, which was held on October the 10th 2019 at the National Theatre of Guatemala, Centro Cultural Miguel Ángel Asturias. In March 2022, Wiza was invited to perform the Symphonic Queen show at the Luis A. Ferré Performing Arts Center in Santurce, Puerto Rico, alongside the Orquesta Camerata Filarmónica.

=== Acting Career – Musical Theatre and Rock of Ages ===
One Wiza made his debut as an actor on the original Broadway musical "Rock of Ages", in February 2018, playing the character of Drew Boley, one of the two lead characters for the show, along Sherry, his counterpart. Rock of Ages is a rock/jukebox musical, with a book by Chris D'Arienzo, built around classic rock songs from the 1980s, especially from the famous glam metal bands of that decade. The musical features songs from Styx, Journey, Bon Jovi, Pat Benatar, Twisted Sister, Steve Perry, Poison and Europe among other well-known rock bands. The show was directed by Guatemalan musical theatre production company Spotlight, and played every Friday and Saturday, starting on February 2 till March 3. This was the second season for the act, which was held at the Dick Smith theatre, AKA the Guatemalan American Institute (IGA) in Guatemala.
