= Barmy Army =

Group of English cricket fans

- Nickname: The Barmy Army
- Established: 1994; 32 years ago
- Type: Supporters' group
- Club: England cricket team
- Location: England
- Stadium: Various
- Stand: Various
- Colours
- Website: www.barmyarmy.com

The Barmy Army is a group of English cricket fans known for supporting the English cricket team in both domestic and international matches.

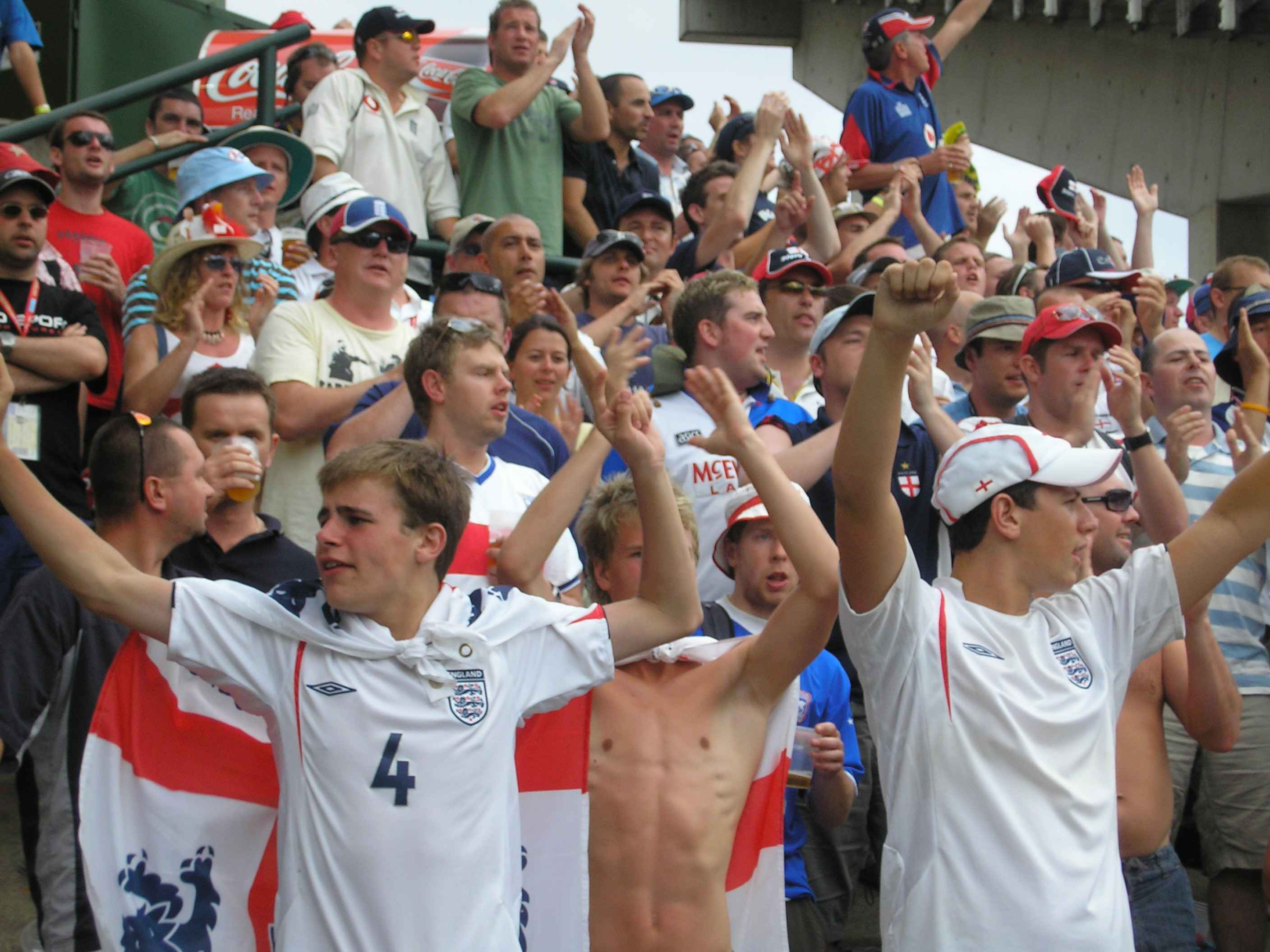
The Barmy Army chanting at the Sydney Cricket Ground

The Barmy Army was at first an informal group but was later turned into a company limited by guarantee, registered in England and Wales. The name is also applied to followers of the team who join in with match day activities in the crowd, but do not necessarily travel as part of an organised tour. Collins dictionary defines the word barmy as "slightly crazy or very foolish". They are known for their song that goes "Barmy Army shout it out come on England".

The group, then less organised, was given its name by the Australian media during the 1994–95 Test series in Australia, reportedly for the fans' hopeless audacity in travelling all the way to Australia in the near-certain knowledge that their team would lose, and the fact that they kept on chanting encouragement to the England team even when England were losing quite badly. It was co-founded by Paul Burnham.

== History ==
On the first day of the fourth Test of the 1994–95 Ashes series at the Adelaide Oval, a group of supporters of the English cricket team during the lunch break headed to 'T-Shirt City' on Hindley Street and ordered 50 shirts saying "Atherton's Barmy Army" after Michael Atherton, who was captaining England in an away Ashes series for the first time, with the Union Jack emblazoned on the back. Over 200 shirts were purchased by the end of the Test, and 3,000 were purchased by the end of the tour. This Test is often cited as the catalyst for the formal establishment of the Barmy Army.

The Barmy Army, which is now a limited company, states that it wants to "make watching cricket more fun and much more popular". The group uses flags, banners, songs and chants to encourage the team and crowd participation in their activities. In contrast to the reputations of some sports fans for hooliganism, the Barmy Army organisers actively discourage and avoid such behaviour.

The group engages in charity work and has gained a good reputation among most cricket administrators. However, many cricket followers find their constant chanting to be annoying and disruptive, particularly during the afternoon sessions of Test matches when the chanting of the Barmy Army, fuelled by their consumption of large amounts of alcohol, often becomes a repetitive, irritating background noise; among others, the renowned cricket writer/commentator Christopher Martin-Jenkins accused them of "demeaning English cricket".

Throughout the 1990s, increased spending power, via a stronger British Pound at the time, enabled fans to take their "Atherton's Barmy Army" song overseas when following tours of the English national cricket team. Because of that particular song, and the fact that it seemed to represent English fans' activity of standing in the hot sun, drinking lager all day until they were sunburnt and unwell, it became a description as well as a song. David Lloyd and Ian Botham used the tag to describe the supporters while commentating for Sky Sports during England's tours from 1993 to 1995.

In the late 1990s, performers Richard Stilgoe and Peter Skellern recognised the need for an anthem for the loyal supporters of a team that regularly seemed to lose and wrote a stirring song called "The Barmy Army", which they included in their touring repertoire. It can be found on their 1999 CD A Quiet Night Out, and humorously celebrates the English team's skill at "snatching defeat from the jaws of victory".

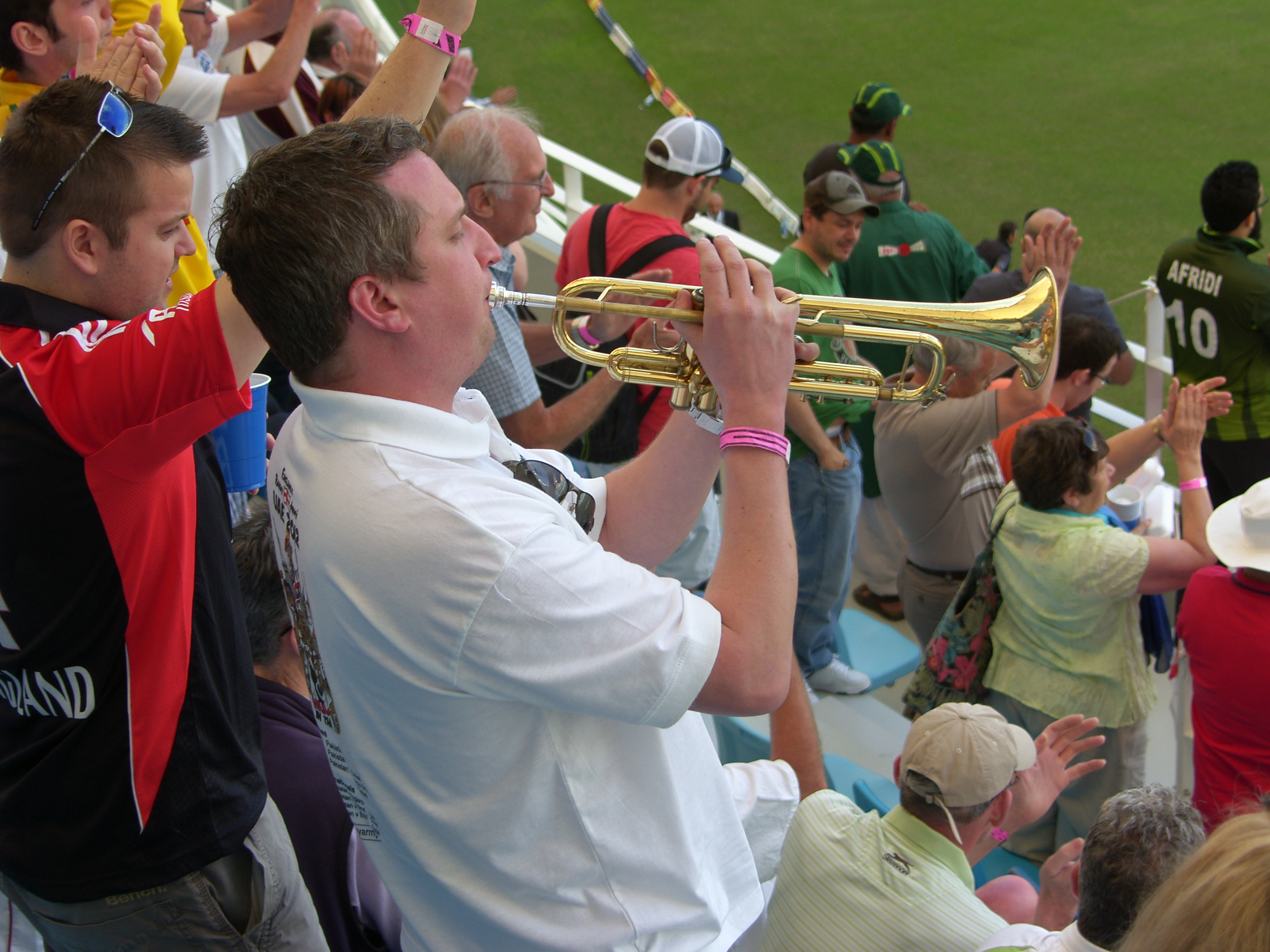
Trumpeter Billy Cooper Cheering England at 1st Test vs Pakistan Dubai January 2012

Most grounds except Lord's reserve areas of seating for Barmy Army fans.

Australian fast bowler Mitchell Johnson, a key part of their 2013–14 Ashes series success, admitted that the Barmy Army rattled him three years earlier. When Johnson had come out to the crease at the Sydney Cricket Ground during the second Australian innings, the Barmy Army had chanted at him, "He bowls to the left, he bowls to the right, that Mitchell Johnson, his bowling is shite!" and Chris Tremlett had bowled him for a golden duck as England went on to win an away Ashes series for the first time in 24 years.

During the 2019–20 English tour of South Africa, Sky Sports filmed a feature story entitled 25 Years of the Barmy Army to commemorate the group's 25-year anniversary. Hosted by Atherton, it covers the group's origins and characteristics, favourite countries to tour and favorite moments and features interviews with Nasser Hussain, Joe Root, and several members.

== In other sports ==
Supporters of English national teams in other sports are also subsidiaries of the Barmy Army. The rugby equivalent was formed in 2014, they also form part of the Army to support British and Irish Lions, while there is another separate subsidiary for Rugby League. The term Barmy Army has also been used to describe the Devonshire football team Plymouth Argyle F.C., usually with a prefix of ‘Green and White’ during stadium-wide chants, although there is no association to the above groups.

One Barmy Army member, Neil Rowe, gained media attention for dressing up as England football manager Gareth Southgate both on England cricket tours and at the 2018 FIFA World Cup in Russia.

== Music ==
For the 1999 ICC Cricket World Cup, the Barmy Army recorded "Come on England", released by Wildstar Records and set to the tune of "Soul Limbo", the original Test Match Special theme by Booker T. & the M.G's. The music video included appearances from Ian Botham, Ronnie Irani, Dickie Bird and Chris Tarrant.

== See also ==
- Bharat Army
- Swami Army
