= The Voice (Australian TV series) season 11 =

The Voice
- Season 11
- Promotional poster featuring coaches (clockwise from left) Urban, Sebastian, Mauboy, and Ora
- Hosted by: Sonia Kruger
- Coaches: Keith Urban; Jessica Mauboy; Rita Ora; Guy Sebastian
- Winner: Lachie Gill
- Winning coach: Rita Ora
- Runners-up: Faith Sosene, Jordan Tavita and Thando Sikwila

Release
- Original network: Seven Network
- Original release: 18 April – 29 May 2022

Season chronology
- ← Previous; Season 10 Next → Season 12

The eleventh season of The Voice began airing on 18 April 2022. In October 2021, it was announced Seven Network had once again picked up the series for its eleventh season, set to broadcast in 2022. At the same time, it was announced that Keith Urban, Jessica Mauboy, Rita Ora, and Guy Sebastian would all return as coaches. Sonia Kruger was also announced to return as host.

Similar to last season, the finale was pre-recorded and the winner was determined by a viewer poll. Lachie Gill was declared the winner, marking Rita Ora's first win as a coach.

== Coaches and Host ==
Coaches and Host of The Voice Season 11

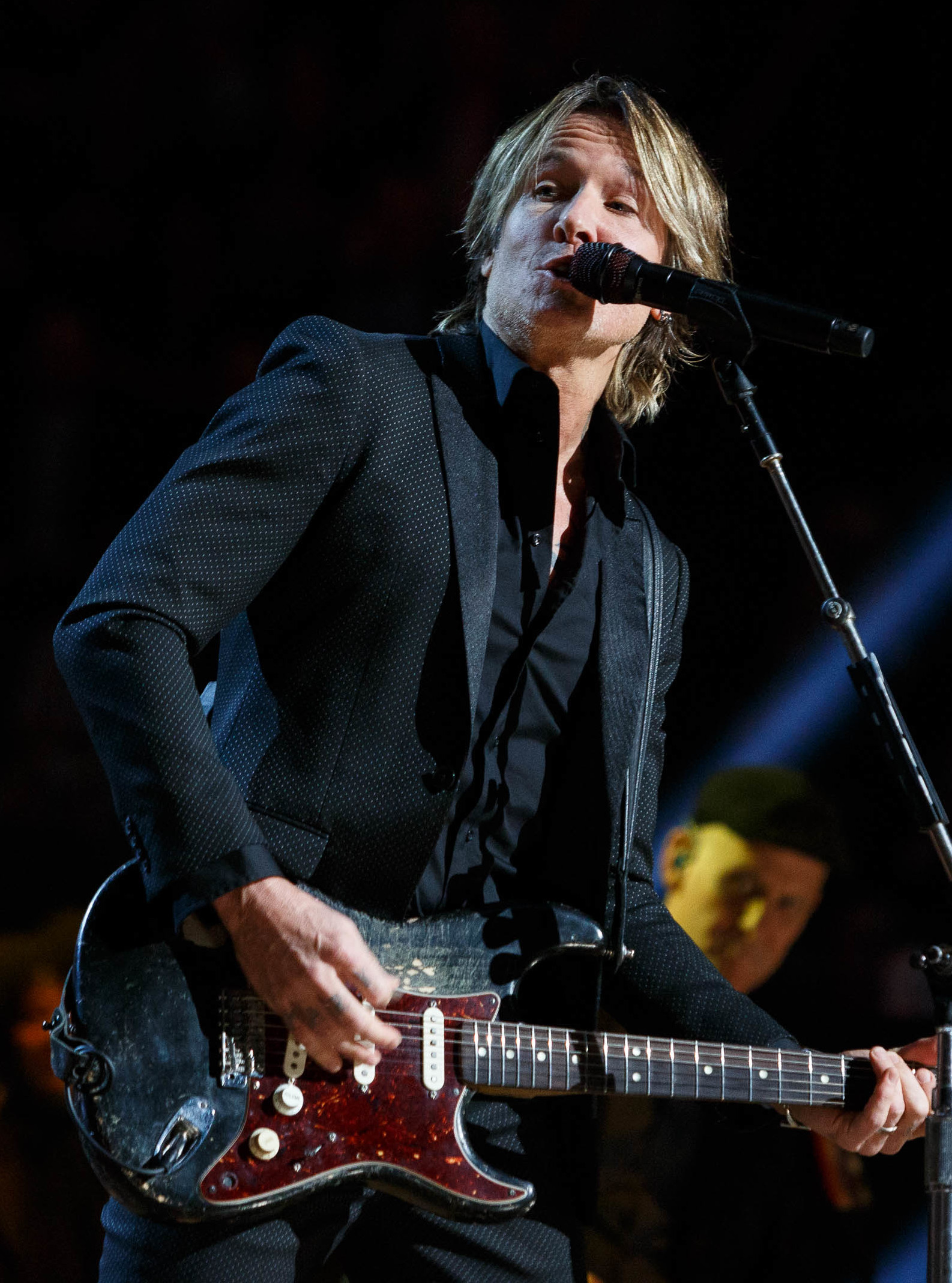
Keith Urban

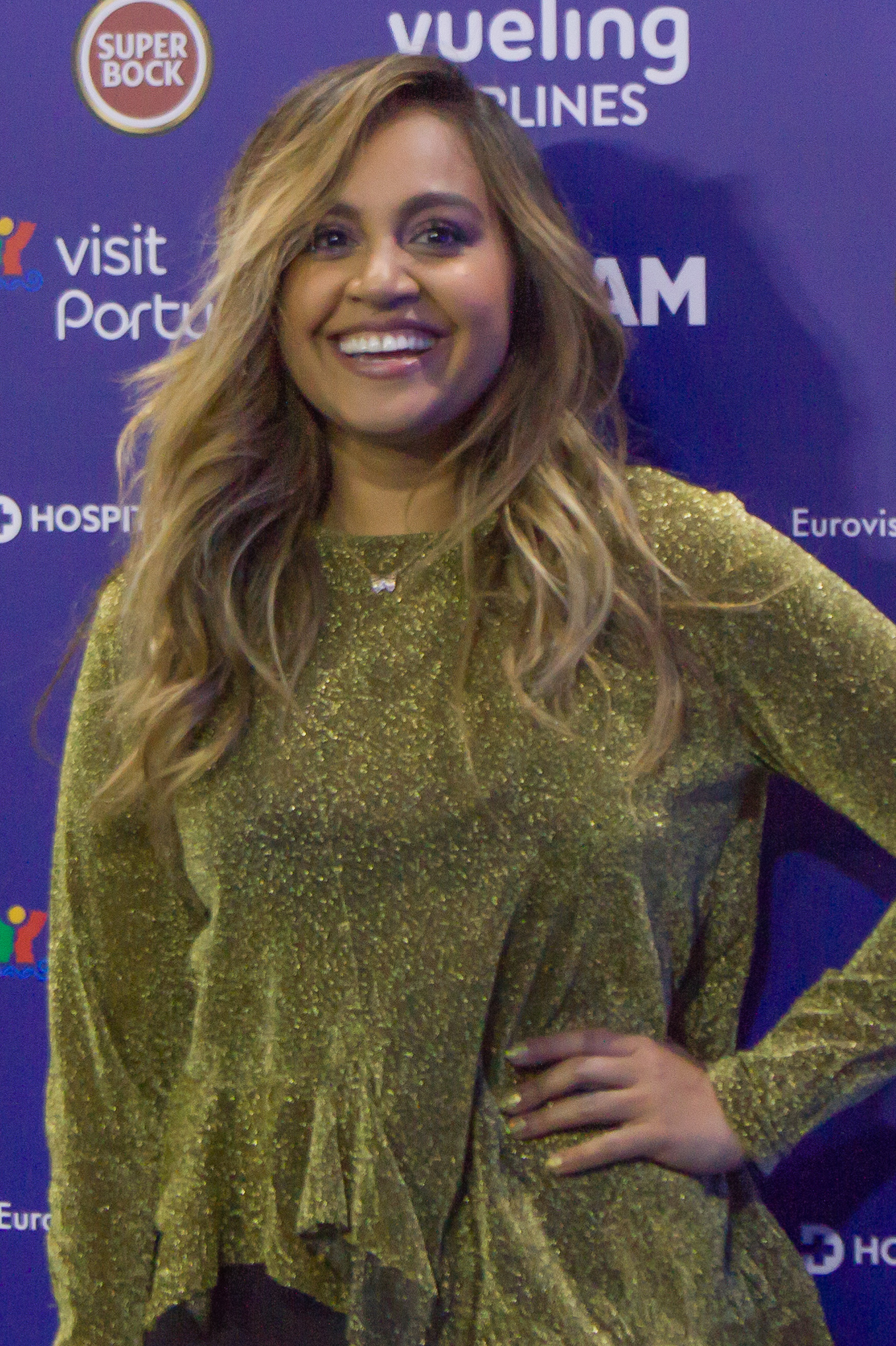
Jessica Mauboy

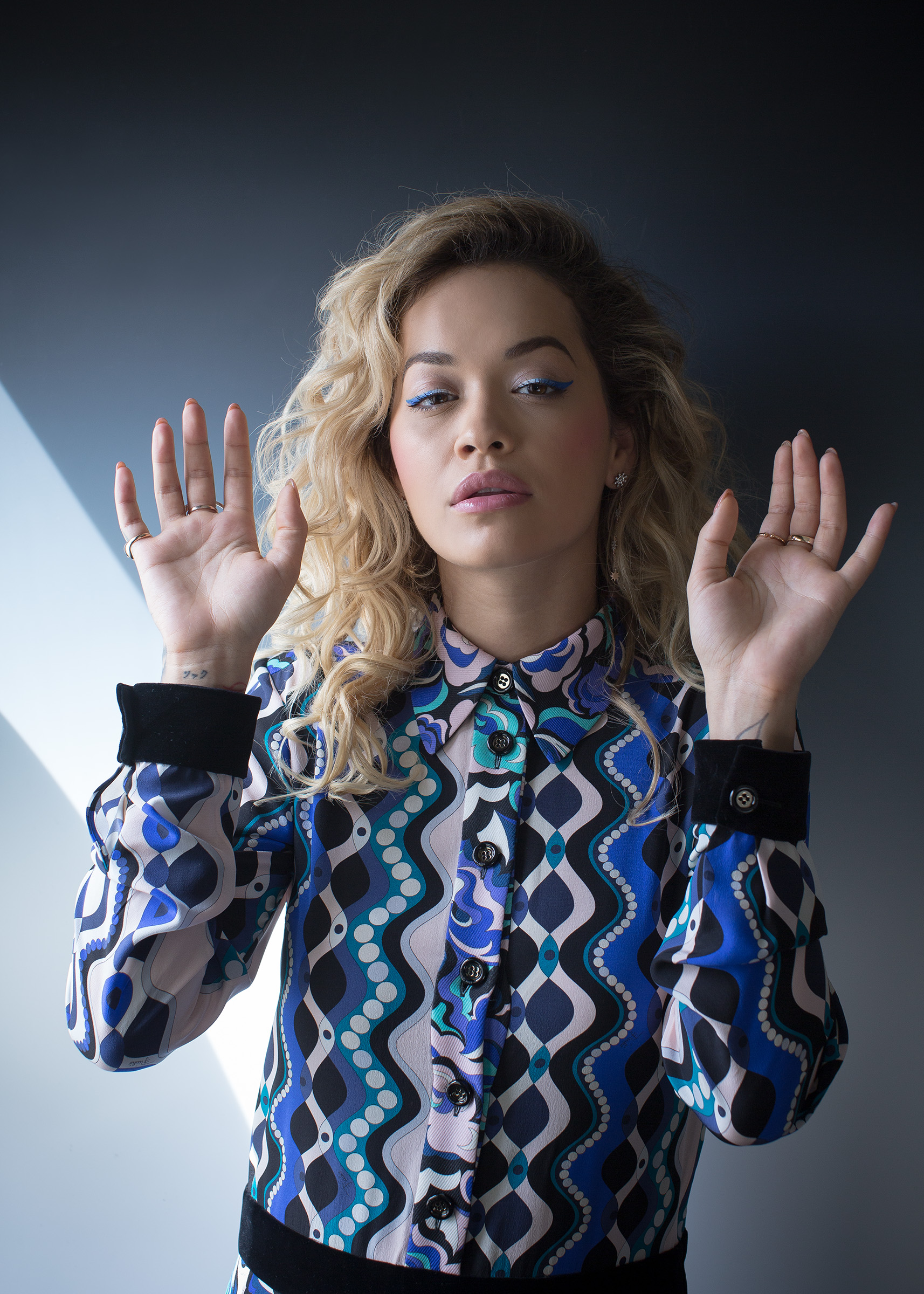
Rita Ora

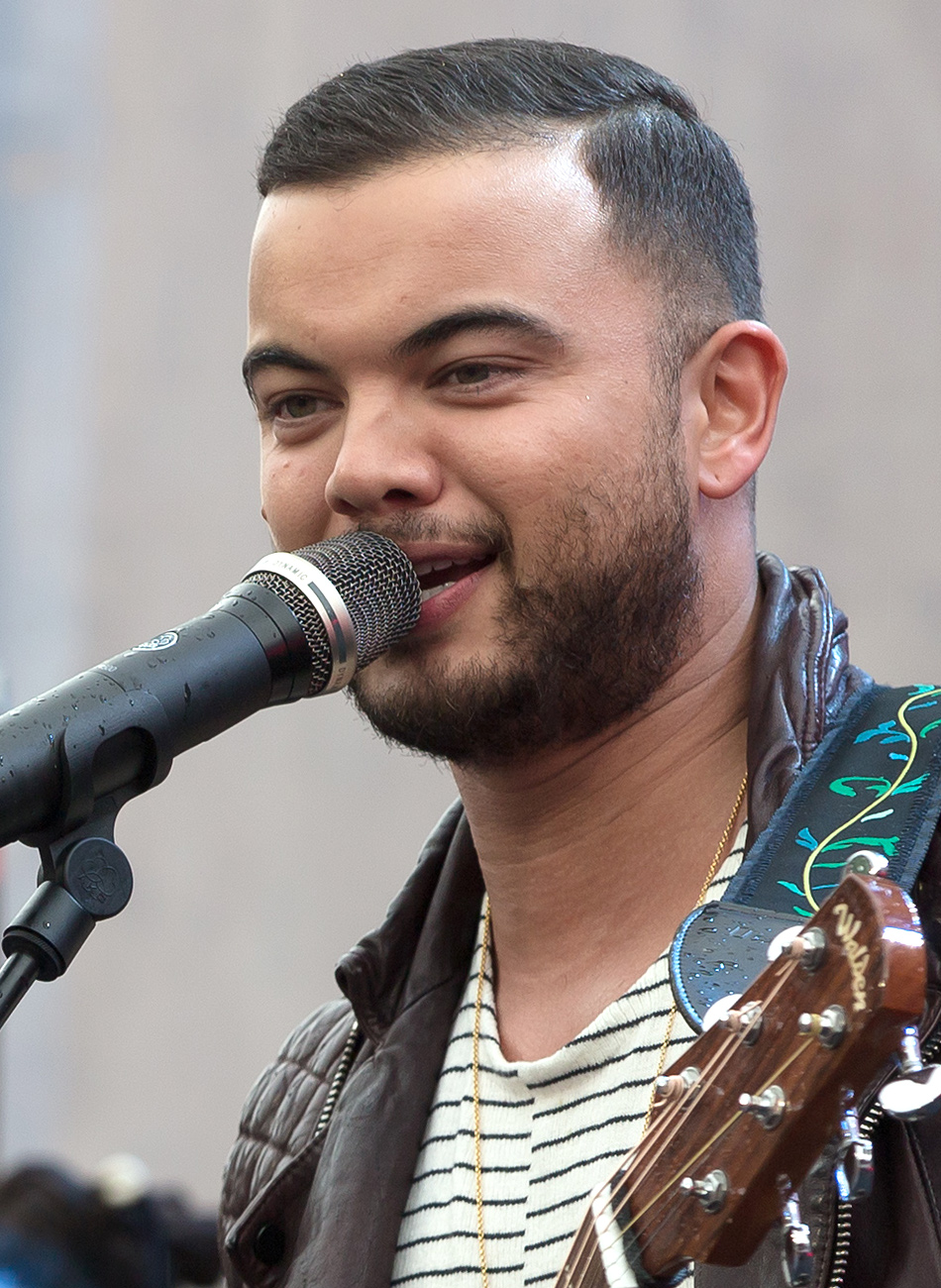
Guy Sebastian

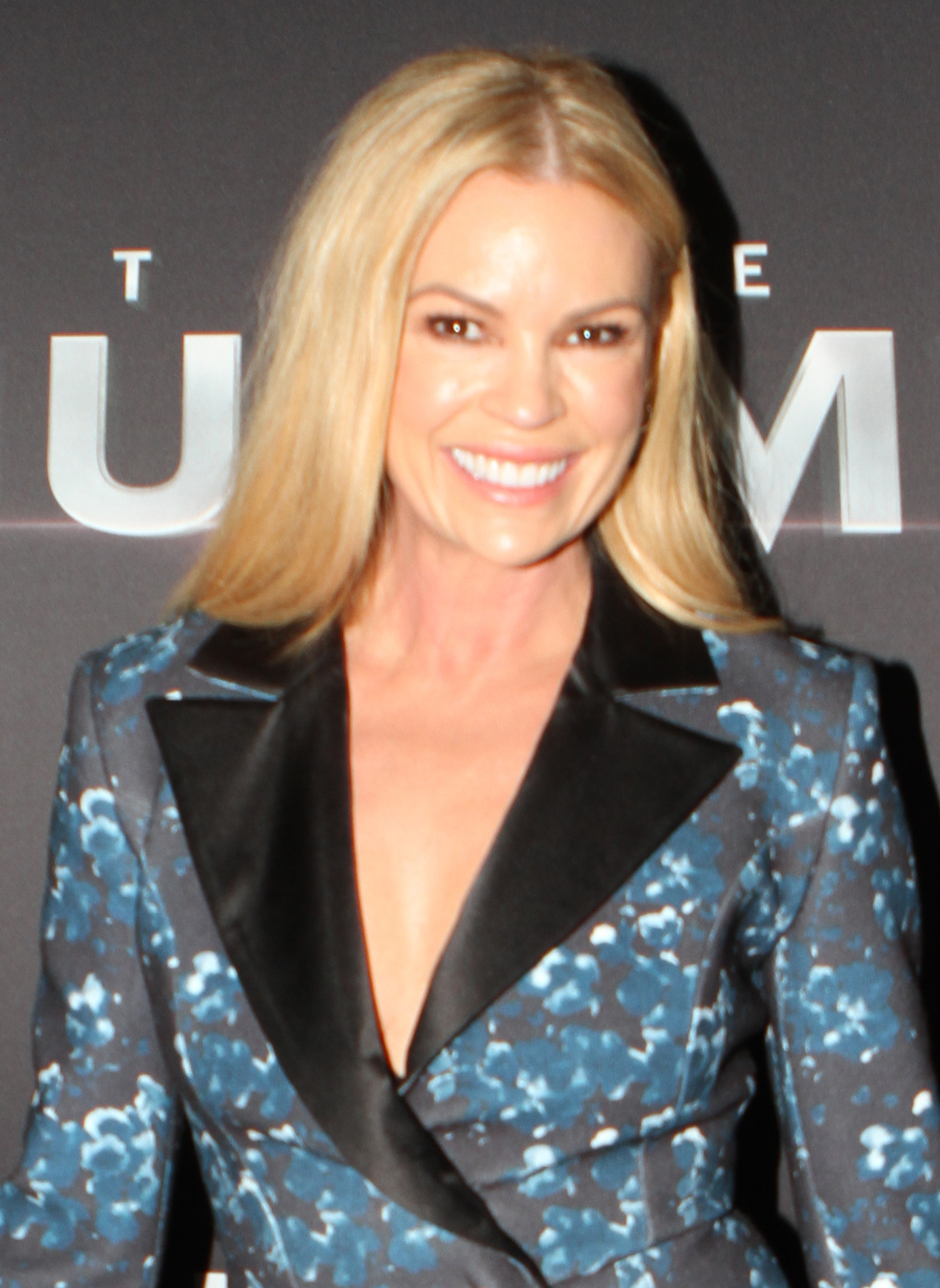
Sonia Kruger

On 11 October 2021, it was announced that Keith Urban, Jessica Mauboy, Rita Ora, and Guy Sebastian would all return as coaches for the eleventh series. Sonia Kruger returned as host.

== Teams ==
Colour key

- Winner
- Runner-Up
- 3rd place
- 4th place
- Eliminated in the Semifinal
- Eliminated in the Singoffs
- Eliminated in the Battles
- Eliminated in the Callbacks

Season eleven coaching teams
Coach	Top 48 Artists					
Keith Urban						
Keith Urban	Thando Sikwila	Lane Pittman	Chriddy Black	Freddie Bailey	Melanie Cowmeadow	Shaun Wessel
Keith Urban	Zoe Koul	Ethan Conway	Jay Sierra	Sam McGovern	Danny Phegan	Taylor Piggott
Jessica Mauboy						
Jessica Mauboy	Faith Sosene	Jael Wena	Finnian Johnson	Kaylee Bell	Richard Tunami	Emily-Jane Conidi
Jessica Mauboy	Ethan Hall	Sunrise Michelle	Sammy Toubia	Summer Beechman	Amber Reid	Elizabeth Hylton
Rita Ora						
Rita Ora	Lachie Gill	Xanthe Campbell	Robbie Dolan	Theoni Marks	Liam Keates-Ryley	Ella & Sienna
Rita Ora	Jioji Nawanawa	Asha Newman	Dominic Clarke	Aleisha Gam	Chloe Kandetzki	Bri Dodd
Guy Sebastian						
Guy Sebastian	Jordan Tavita	Cassidy Mackie	Celestial Utai	Emerson Alexander	Liam Conroy	Jas Winter
Guy Sebastian	Nicola De Sensi	Ally Eley	Vanessa Librea	Georgie Lyons	Jesse Rudman	Connor Wink
Note: Underlined names are artists that received a Battle Pass from their coach.

== Blind auditions ==
In the blind auditions, the coaches complete their teams with 12 members each. Each coach can block another two times and the coach who is blocked is unable to pitch for the artist. However, new to this season, a coach can block at any time, even during their pitch as long as the blocker turned his/her chair. Also, this season introduces the Battle Pass. In this twist, coaches will have a new button, in addition to the main button and the block buttons. The Battle Pass allows a coach to automatically send the contestant to the battles. Each coach could only press the button for one artist in the entire phase.

Blind auditions colour key
✔	Coach hit the "I WANT YOU" button
	Artist defaulted to this team
	Artist elected to join this team
	Artist eliminated with no coach pressing "I WANT YOU" button
	Artist received a 'Battle Pass' and immediately advanced to the battles
✘	Coach pressed "I WANT YOU" button, but was blocked by another coach from getting the artist
	Blocked by Keith; Blocked by Jess; Blocked by Rita; Blocked by Guy

Blind auditions results
Episode	Order	Artist	Age	Song	Coach's and artist's choices			
Episode	Order	Artist	Age	Song	Keith	Jess	Rita	Guy
Episode 1 (Monday, 18 April)	1	Ally Eley	19	"Teenage Dirtbag"	✔	✔	✔	✔
Episode 1 (Monday, 18 April)	2	Lachie Gill	23	"If the World Was Ending"	✔	✔	✔	✘
Episode 1 (Monday, 18 April)	3	Thando Sikwila	28	"I'm Every Woman"	✔	✔	✔	✔
Episode 1 (Monday, 18 April)	4	Danny Phegan	48	"This Town"	✔	✔	✔	—
Episode 1 (Monday, 18 April)	5	Lou P Scarlett	30	"Say So"	—	—	—	—
Episode 1 (Monday, 18 April)	6	Asha Newman	23	"R.I.P."	✔	✔	✔	✔
Episode 1 (Monday, 18 April)	7	Faith Sosene	24	"Because You Loved Me"	✔	✔	✔	✔
Episode 2 (Tuesday, 19 April)	1	Jordan Tavita	23	"Man in the Mirror"	✔	✔	✔	✔
Episode 2 (Tuesday, 19 April)	2	Sammi Palinkis	31	"Nutbush City Limits	—	—	—	—
Episode 2 (Tuesday, 19 April)	3	Jay Sierra	27	"God Is a Woman"	✔	—	✔	✘
Episode 2 (Tuesday, 19 April)	4	Sunrise Michelle	17	"People Help the People"	—	✔	✔	—
Episode 2 (Tuesday, 19 April)	5	Dominic Clarke	25	"This City"	✔	✔	✔	✔
Episode 2 (Tuesday, 19 April)	6	Nicola de Sensi	20	"When the Party's Over"	✔	✔	✔	✔
Episode 2 (Tuesday, 19 April)	7	Shaun Wessel	40	"Whipping Post"	✔	✔	✔	✔
Episode 3 (Wednesday, 20 April)	1	Emily-Jane Conidi	27	"This Is Me"	✔	✔	✔	✔
Episode 3 (Wednesday, 20 April)	2	Liam Conroy	28	"Falling"	—	✔	✔	✔
Episode 3 (Wednesday, 20 April)	3	Aleisha Gam	26	"Make You Feel My Love"	✔	✔	✔	✔
Episode 3 (Wednesday, 20 April)	4	Jerrod Smith	24	"She Looks So Perfect"	—	—	—	—
Episode 3 (Wednesday, 20 April)	5	Vanessa Librea	24	"Don't Go Yet"	—	—	—	✔
Episode 3 (Wednesday, 20 April)	6	Sam McGovern	22	"I Still Haven't Found What I'm Looking For"	✔	✔	—	—
Episode 3 (Wednesday, 20 April)	7	Kaylee Bell	32	"Keith" (original song)	✘	✔	✔	✔
Episode 4 (Monday, 25 April)	1	Ethan Hall	13	"Pie Jesu"	✔	✔	✔	✔
Episode 4 (Monday, 25 April)	2	Robbie Dolan	26	"Let It Go"	—	✔	✔	✔
Episode 4 (Monday, 25 April)	3	Freddie Bailey	17	"Wild Hearts"	✔	✔	—	—
Episode 4 (Monday, 25 April)	4	Tori Lea	28	"It's Raining Men"	—	—	—	—
Episode 4 (Monday, 25 April)	5	Georgie Lyons	18	"Anyone"	✔	—	—	✔
Episode 4 (Monday, 25 April)	6	Emerson Alexander	39	"Head & Heart"	—	—	✔	✔
Episode 4 (Monday, 25 April)	7	Zoe Koul	21	"Hold"	✔	✔	✔	✘
Episode 5 (Tuesday, 26 April)	1	Jael Wena	16	"How Will I Know"	✔	✔	✔	✔
Episode 5 (Tuesday, 26 April)	2	Alisha George	19	"Standing with You"	—	—	—	—
Episode 5 (Tuesday, 26 April)	3	Ethan Conway	25	"Exile"	✔	✔	✔	✔
Episode 5 (Tuesday, 26 April)	4	Tahalianna Soward-Mahanga	15	"Freedom"	—	—	—	—
Episode 5 (Tuesday, 26 April)	5	Wednesday Reign	20	"Since U Been Gone"	—	—	—	—
Episode 5 (Tuesday, 26 April)	6	Amali Dimond	15	"I'm Outta Love"	—	—	—	—
Episode 5 (Tuesday, 26 April)	7	Jioji Nawanawa	21	"Gettin' Jiggy wit It"	—	—	✔	—
Episode 5 (Tuesday, 26 April)	8	Sammy Toubia	19	"Scars to Your Beautiful"	—	✔	—	—
Episode 5 (Tuesday, 26 April)	9	Jas Winter	20	"Runnin' (Lose It All)"	✘	—	✔	✔
Episode 6 (Wednesday, 27 April)	1	Richard Tunami	36	"Call Out My Name"	—	✔	✔	—
Episode 6 (Wednesday, 27 April)	2	Summer Beechman	19	"Without You"	✔	✔	✔	✔
Episode 6 (Wednesday, 27 April)	3	Chloe Kandetzki	20	"I Have Nothing"	—	✘	✔	—
Episode 6 (Wednesday, 27 April)	4	Leonardo Iliev	20	"She Nasty" (original song)	—	—	—	—
Episode 6 (Wednesday, 27 April)	5	Jesse Rudman	34	"3AM"	—	—	—	✔
Episode 6 (Wednesday, 27 April)	6	Conrad de Silva	80	"L-O-V-E"	—	—	—	—
Episode 6 (Wednesday, 27 April)	7	Melanie Cowmeadow	23	"Never Let Me Go"	✔	✔	✔	✔
Episode 7 (Sunday, 1 May)	1	Lane Pittman	15	"Even Though I'm Leaving"	✔	✔	✔	✔
Episode 7 (Sunday, 1 May)	2	Amber Reid	23	"Butter"	—	✔	✔	✔
Episode 7 (Sunday, 1 May)	3	Ella & Sienna	15 & 19	"Cardigan"	✔	✔	✔	—
Episode 7 (Sunday, 1 May)	4	Christina Barilla	54	"I'm So Excited"	—	—	—	—
Episode 7 (Sunday, 1 May)	5	Chriddy Black	29	"Stay"	✔	✔	✔	✔
Episode 7 (Sunday, 1 May)	6	Connor Wink	23	"Believe"	✔	✔	✔	✔
Episode 7 (Sunday, 1 May)	7	Celestial Utai	22	"Déjà Vu"	✔	✘	✔	✔
Episode 8 (Monday, 2 May)	1	Liam Keates-Ryley	19	"Land of 1000 Dances"	—	✔	✔	—
Episode 8 (Monday, 2 May)	2	Elizabeth Hylton	47	"O mio babbino caro"	—	✔	—	—
Episode 8 (Monday, 2 May)	3	Terry Lockley	62	"Old Town Road"	—	—	—	—
Episode 8 (Monday, 2 May)	4	Mizze Maxx	28	"Bad Reputation"	—	—	—	—
Episode 8 (Monday, 2 May)	5	Taylor Piggott	26	"Yellow"	✔	✔	✔	✔
Episode 8 (Monday, 2 May)	6	Shaneel Chandra	17	"I Am A Disco Dancer"	Team Full	—	—	—
Episode 8 (Monday, 2 May)	7	Emma Jayne	22	"Let You Love Me"	Team Full	—	—	—
Episode 8 (Monday, 2 May)	8	Cassidy Mackie	26	"King of Wishful Thinking"	Team Full	✔	✔	✔
Episode 9 (Tuesday, 3 May)	1	Xanthe Campbell	17	"Happier Than Ever"	Team Full	✔	✔	Team Full
Episode 9 (Tuesday, 3 May)	2	Arthur Hull	17	"When I Was Your Man"	Team Full	—	—	Team Full
Episode 9 (Tuesday, 3 May)	3	Bri Dodd	25	"Fallin'"	Team Full	✔	✔	Team Full
Episode 9 (Tuesday, 3 May)	4	Finnian Johnson	19	"July"	Team Full	✔	✘	Team Full
Episode 9 (Tuesday, 3 May)	5	Georgia Rose	19	"Valerie"	Team Full	Team Full	—	Team Full
Episode 9 (Tuesday, 3 May)	6	Katelyn Vella	18	"Rain on Me"	Team Full	Team Full	—	Team Full
Episode 9 (Tuesday, 3 May)	7	Theoni Marks	19	"Easy on Me"	Team Full	Team Full	✔	Team Full

== Callbacks ==
The Callbacks aired on 4 May. In this round, each coach needs to trim down their artists from 12 down to 6. Shaun Wessel, Faith Sosene, Celestial Utai, and Theoni Marks have been given Battle Passes from their coaches. This allows them to skip the Callbacks, and go straight to the battles.

Each coach splits the remaining eleven team members into groups of three or four. Those three or four artists then take to the stage together and each performs a different song based on the theme selected by the coaches. In each group, the coach can select one, two, or all of them; as long as each coach has selected five artists to advance to the battles.

In total, only six from each team will advance to the battle rounds: five selected by the coach in the callbacks (with some reprising their blind audition song and not required to perform in the sing-off in front of an audience) and the Battle Pass recipient. The artists not chosen in this round will be eliminated.

Callbacks colour key
Artist was chosen to advance to the Battles
Artist was eliminated

Callbacks off-stage results
Episode	Order	Coach	Song	Winner(s)	Loser(s)	Song
Episode 10 (Wednesday, 4 May)	1	Jess	"July"	Finnian Johnson	Sunrise Michelle	"People Help the People"
Episode 10 (Wednesday, 4 May)	1	Jess	"July"	Finnian Johnson	Ethan Hall	"Pie Jesu"
Episode 10 (Wednesday, 4 May)	2	Jess	"This Is Me"	Emily-Jane Conidi	Elizabeth Hylton	"O mio babbino caro"
Episode 10 (Wednesday, 4 May)	3	Rita	"Land of 1000 Dances"	Liam Keates-Ryley	Jioji Nawanawa	"Gettin' Jiggy wit It"
Episode 10 (Wednesday, 4 May)	4	Rita	"Cardigan"	Ella & Sienna	Chloe Kandetzki	"I Have Nothing"
Episode 10 (Wednesday, 4 May)	4	Rita	"Cardigan"	Ella & Sienna	Aleisha Gam	"Make You Feel My Love"
Episode 10 (Wednesday, 4 May)	5	Keith	"Never Let Me Go"	Melanie Cowmeadow	Sam McGovern	"I Still Haven't Found What I'm Looking For"
Episode 10 (Wednesday, 4 May)	6	Keith	"I'm Every Woman"	Thando Sikwila	Ethan Conway	"Exile"

Callbacks results
Episode	Order	Coach	Theme	Song	Winner(s)	Loser(s)	Song
Episode 10 (Wednesday, 4 May)	1	Jess	Britney Spears	"Lucky"	Kaylee Bell	Amber Reid	"...Baby One More Time"
Episode 10 (Wednesday, 4 May)	1	Jess	Britney Spears	"My Prerogative"	Richard Tunami	Amber Reid	"...Baby One More Time"
Episode 10 (Wednesday, 4 May)	2	Keith	Pop Hits	"Call Me Maybe"	Freddie Bailey	Danny Phegan	"Castle on the Hill"
Episode 10 (Wednesday, 4 May)	2	Keith	Pop Hits	"Driver's License"	Lane Pittman	Danny Phegan	"Castle on the Hill"
Episode 10 (Wednesday, 4 May)	3	Guy	Adele	"Someone Like You"	Liam Conroy		
Episode 10 (Wednesday, 4 May)	3	Guy	Adele	"Oh My God"	Emerson Alexander		
Episode 10 (Wednesday, 4 May)	3	Guy	Adele	"All I Ask"	Jordan Tavita		
Episode 10 (Wednesday, 4 May)	4	Rita	Lewis Capaldi	"Bruises"	Lachie Gill	Dominic Clarke	"Someone You Loved"
Episode 10 (Wednesday, 4 May)	4	Rita	Lewis Capaldi	"Before You Go"	Robbie Dolan	Dominic Clarke	"Someone You Loved"
Episode 10 (Wednesday, 4 May)	5	Jess	Ariana Grande	"Breathin"	Jael Wena	Sammy Toubia	"Thank U, Next"
Episode 10 (Wednesday, 4 May)	5	Jess	Ariana Grande	"Breathin"	Jael Wena	Summer Beechman	"Stuck With U"
Episode 10 (Wednesday, 4 May)	6	Rita	Avril Lavigne	"I'm with You"	Xanthe Campbell	Asha Newman	"Sk8er Boi"
Episode 10 (Wednesday, 4 May)	6	Rita	Avril Lavigne	"I'm with You"	Xanthe Campbell	Bri Dodd	"Bite Me"
Episode 10 (Wednesday, 4 May)	7	Guy	Justin Bieber	"Lonely"	Cassidy Mackie	Ally Eley	"Sorry"
Episode 10 (Wednesday, 4 May)	7	Guy	Justin Bieber	"Cold Water"	Jas Winter	Vanessa Librea	"I Don't Care"
Episode 10 (Wednesday, 4 May)	8	Keith	Billie Eilish	"idontwannabeyouanymore"	Chriddy Black	Zoe Koul	"i love you"
Episode 10 (Wednesday, 4 May)	8	Keith	Billie Eilish	"idontwannabeyouanymore"	Chriddy Black	Jay Sierra	"bad guy"
Episode 10 (Wednesday, 4 May)	8	Keith	Billie Eilish	"idontwannabeyouanymore"	Chriddy Black	Taylor Piggott	"Lovely"

== Battles ==
The Battles aired on 8 May and 15 May. In the battles, coaches are to cut their team from 6 to 3 by pairing two of their artists to sing the same song as a duet.

Team Guy and Keith performed on the first night of battles and Team Jess and Rita performed on the second night.

Battles colour key
Artist won the battle and advances straight to the Semifinal
Artist won the battle and advances to the Singoffs
Artist lost the battle and was eliminated

Battles results
Episode	Order	Coach	Winner	Song	Loser
Episode 11 (Sunday, 8 May)	1	Keith	Thando Sikwila	"Beggin'"	Shaun Wessel
Episode 11 (Sunday, 8 May)	2	Guy	Cassidy Mackie	"Decode"	Jas Winter
Episode 11 (Sunday, 8 May)	3	Keith	Chriddy Black	"Ghost"	Melanie Cowmeadow
Episode 11 (Sunday, 8 May)	4	Guy	Emerson Alexander	"Love Me Again"	Liam Conroy
Episode 11 (Sunday, 8 May)	5	Keith	Lane Pittman	"Edge of Midnight"	Freddie Bailey
Episode 11 (Sunday, 8 May)	6	Guy	Celestial Utai	"Art of Love"	N/A
Episode 11 (Sunday, 8 May)	6	Guy	Jordan Tavita	"Art of Love"	N/A
Episode 12 (Sunday, 15 May)	1	Jess	Faith Sosene	"I'm Your Baby Tonight"	Emily-Jane Conidi
Episode 12 (Sunday, 15 May)	2	Rita	Robbie Dolan	"Wrecking Ball"	Ella & Sienna
Episode 12 (Sunday, 15 May)	3	Jess	Jael Wena	"Thriller"	Richard Tunami
Episode 12 (Sunday, 15 May)	4	Rita	Xanthe Campbell	"Don't Speak"	Liam Keates-Ryley
Episode 12 (Sunday, 15 May)	5	Jess	Finnian Johnson	"Landslide"	Kaylee Bell
Episode 12 (Sunday, 15 May)	6	Rita	Lachie Gill	"It'll Be Okay"	Theoni Marks

=== Singoffs ===
In the Singoffs, coaches pick one of their 3 or 4 battle winners to go straight through to the Semifinals. Then the 2 or 3 remaining artists must Singoff for the last remaining spot on their team to advance to the semifinal.

Singoffs colour key
Artist was chosen to advance to the Semifinal
Artist was eliminated

Singoffs results
Episode	Order	Coach	Song	Winner	Loser(s)	Song
Episode 11 (8 May)	1	Keith	"Chandelier"	Thando Sikwila	Chriddy Black	"Talking to the Moon"
Episode 11 (8 May)	2	Guy	"Dancing On My Own"	Jordan Tavita	Emerson Alexander	"Superstition"
Episode 11 (8 May)	2	Guy	"Dancing On My Own"	Jordan Tavita	Celestial Utai	"Bust Your Windows"
Episode 12 (15 May)	1	Jess	"Ain't No Way"	Faith Sosene	Finnian Johnson	"You Are The Reason"
Episode 12 (15 May)	2	Rita	"I Guess I'm in Love"	Lachie Gill	Robbie Dolan	"Breakeven"

== Finals ==
=== Semi-final ===
The Semifinal aired on 22 May. The 8 remaining artists sing different songs for a place in the Grand Final. At the end of the episode, coaches are only allowed to pick one artist from their team to advance to the Grand Final.

Semi-final results
Order	Coach	Contestant	Song	Result
1	Guy	Jordan Tavita	"I Want to Know What Love Is"	Saved by coach
2	Keith	Thando Sikwila	"POV"	Saved by coach
3	Guy	Cassidy Mackie	"I Love You Always Forever"	Eliminated
4	Keith	Lane Pittman	"Father and Son"	Eliminated
5	Jess	Jael Wena	"Don't Start Now"	Eliminated
6	Rita	Xanthe Campbell	"ABCDEFU"	Eliminated
7	Rita	Lachie Gill	"Deja Vu"	Saved by coach
8	Jess	Faith Sosene	"Listen"	Saved by coach

=== Grand Finale ===
The Grand Finale was broadcast on 29 May 2022. Each artist performed a solo song and a duet with their coach. Similar to the last two seasons, this was the only episode of the season where the results were determined by public vote and not by the coaches. Lachie Gill was declared the winner, marking Rita Ora's first win as a coach.

Finale results
Coach	Contestant	Order	Solo song	Order	Duet song	Result
Jessica Mauboy	Faith Sosene	1	"Beautiful"	6	"Emotions"	Runner-Up
Keith Urban	Thando Sikwila	5	"Rise Up"	2	"Oh My God"	4th Place
Rita Ora	Lachie Gill	3	"Time After Time"	8	"Always Remember Us This Way"	Winner
Guy Sebastian	Jordan Tavita	7	"Ghost Town"	4	"Hallelujah"	3rd Place

== Contestants who appeared on previous season or TV shows ==
- Thando Sikwila appeared in the third season under Team Kylie, but was stolen by Ricky Martin and was eliminated in the sing-off.
- Jay Sierra was on the fourth season of The X Factor, as a member of The Collective, where they came third.
- Jael Wena was a finalist in The Voice: Generations as a group act with her family under Team Guy. She was also a contestant on season 9 of Australia's Got Talent and got eliminated in the semi-finals. She also represented Australia at the Junior Eurovision Song Contest 2018 finishing in third place.
- Ethan Conway was on season 4, and was on Team Jessie J and eliminated in the super battles.
- Chloe Kandetzki was on season 6, and was on Team Kelly then eliminated in the knockouts.
- Chriddy Black was on season 8, and was on Team Guy and eliminated in the battles.
- Dominic Clarke was a gymnast who competed in the 2020 Summer Olympics in Tokyo, Japan.
- Robbie Dolan was a jockey who competed in and won the 2024 Melbourne Cup.

== Ratings ==
Colour key:

– Highest rating during the season
– Lowest rating during the season

The Voice season eleven consolidated viewership and adjusted position
Episode		Original airdate	Timeslot	Metro Overnight TV Viewers	Night Rank	Total TV Viewers	Night Rank	Source
1	"Blind Auditions"	18 April 2022	Monday 7:00 pm	843,000	5	1,532,000	5	
2	"Blind Auditions"	19 April 2022	Tuesday 7:30 pm	735,000	5	1,373,000	5	
3	"Blind Auditions"	20 April 2022	Wednesday 7:30 pm	629,000	5	1,248,000	5	
4	"Blind Auditions"	25 April 2022	Monday 7:30 pm	767,000	5	1,456,000	5	
5	"Blind Auditions"	26 April 2022	Tuesday 7:30 pm	712,000	5	1,378,000	5	
6	"Blind Auditions"	27 April 2022	Wednesday 7:30 pm	683,000	5	1,357,000	5	
7	"Blind Auditions"	1 May 2022	Sunday 7:00 pm	768,000	3	1,380,000	3	
8	"Blind Auditions"	2 May 2022	Monday 7:30 pm	701,000	5	1,358,000	5	
9	"Blind Auditions"	3 May 2022	Tuesday 7:30 pm	753,000	5	1,408,000	5	
10	"Callbacks"	4 May 2022	Wednesday 7:30 pm	652,000	5	1,335,000	5	
11	"Battles"	8 May 2022	Sunday 7:00pm	766,000	3	1,441,000	3	
12	"Battles"	15 May 2022	Sunday 7:00pm	726,000	3	1,356,000	3	
13	"Semi Finals"	22 May 2022	Sunday 7:00pm	781,000	3	1,422,000	3	
14	"The Grand Finale"	29 May 2022	Sunday 7:00pm	751,000	4	1,388,000	4	
14	"Winner Announced"	29 May 2022	Sunday 7:00pm	779,000	3	1,390,000	3	
