= Thando (musician) =

South African Australian singer

Thando Sikwila
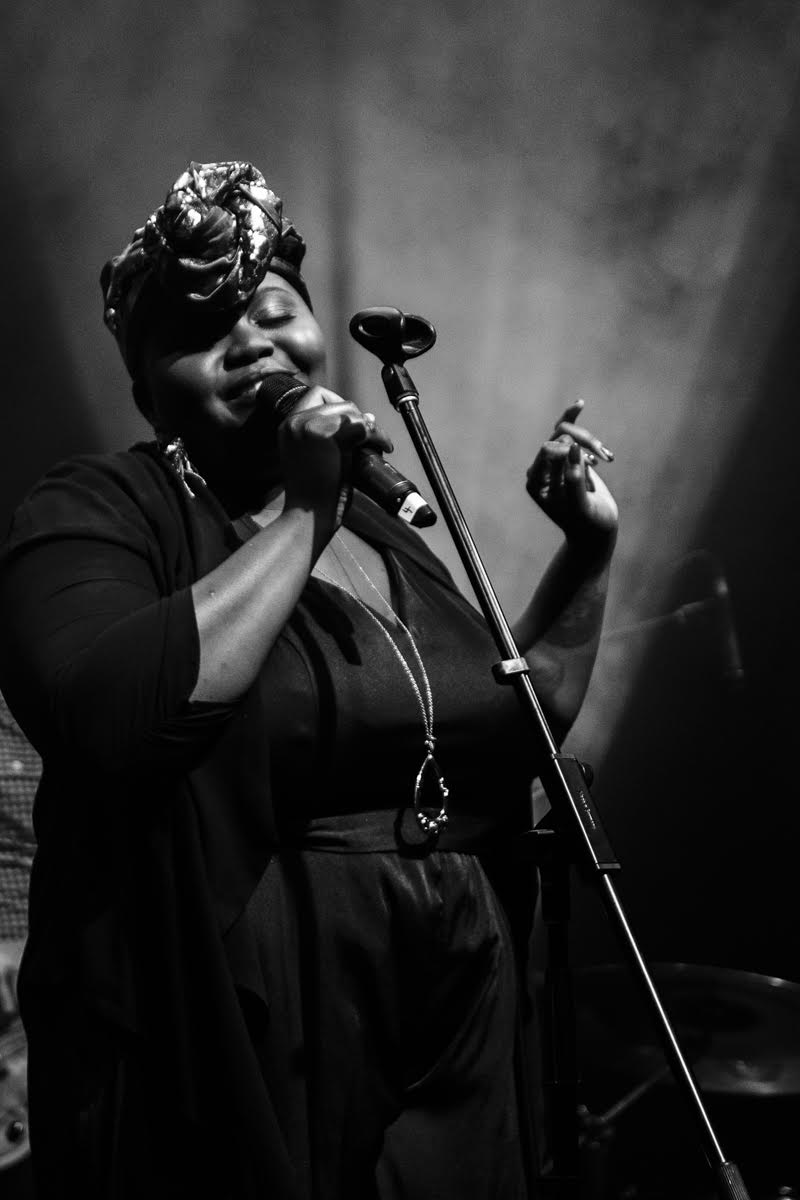

Background information
- Born: Thandolwethu Emily Nomvula Sikwila; Bulawayo, Zimbabwe
- Origin: Melbourne, Victoria, Australia
- Genres: R&B; soul
- Occupations: Singer; songwriter
- Instruments: Vocals; piano
- Years active: 2003–present

Thandolwethu Emily Nomvula Sikwila, known mononymously as Thando and since 2022 as Thndo, is a Zimbabwean Australian singer, songwriter and actor based in Melbourne, Victoria. She's most notable for her appearances on The Voice Australia. She was a contestant on season three, but was eliminated in the sing-offs. She later returned in season eleven and made it to the finals. She also portrayed Effie White in Australia's first professional production of Dreamgirls, presented by StageArt. In 2024, Thando played Joanne in the Australian production of Rent.

== Early life ==
Thando was born in Bulawayo, Zimbabwe on 9 April 1993 to parents Nokuthula and Victor Sikwila. Thando is bilingual being able to speak Ndebele.

== Career ==
=== The Voice Australia 2014 ===
She auditioned for the third season of The Voice Australia with the song Mercy at the age of twenty and chose Kylie Minogue as her coach. She was eliminated in the sing-offs.

The Voice performances and results (2014)
Episode	Song	Original Artist	Result
Audition	"Mercy"	Duffy	Through to The Battles
The Battles	"Clown" (vs Candice Skjonnemand)	Emeli Sandé	Lost. Saved by Ricky. Through to the Showdowns
Showdowns	"Sex on Fire"	Kings of Leon	Through to the Sing-Off
Sing-Off	"Mercy"	Duffy	Eliminated

=== The Voice Australia 2022 ===
She auditioned for The Voice Australia again in 2022, for its eleventh season. She turned all four chairs in her blind audition due to her amazing, powerful and soulful voice, and chose Keith Urban as her coach. She made it to the Grand Finale and finished fourth, with Lachie Gill taking the $100 000 prize.

The Voice performances and results (2022)
Episode	Song	Original Artist	Result
Audition	"I'm Every Woman"	Chaka Khan	Through to The Callbacks
The Callbacks	"I'm Every Woman" (vs Ethan Conway)	Chaka Khan	Through to Battles
Battles	"Beggin'" (vs Shaun Wessell)	The Four Seasons	Through to the Sing-Offs
Sing-Offs	"Chandelier (song)"	Sia	Saved by Coach. Through to Semi Final
Semi Final	"POV"	Ariana Grande	Saved by Coach. Through to Grand Final
Grand Final	"Rise Up"	Andra Day	Fourth place
Grand Final	"Oh My God" (with Keith Urban)	Adele	Fourth place

== Discography ==
=== Extended plays ===
List of extended plays, with selected details
Title	Details
Bury The Weapon	Released: December 2013; Label: Format:
Remix the Weapons	Released: November 2014; Label: Format:
Digital Love Letters	Released: June 2016; Label: Format:
Life In Colour	Released: 27 August 2021; Label: Independent; Format: Digital

=== Singles ===
Title	Year
"Inferno"	2013
"Won't You Be Mine"	2014
"Trouble"	2016
"Something"	2016
"Numb" (featuring Remi)	2018
“Journey To The Past” (with Greg Gould)	2021
"Fall"	2022
"Along the Way"	2023

== Guest or featured artist ==
- "Brainless" - Sinks feat. Thando (single, 2017, independent)
- "The Antidote" - Sinks feat. Dyl Thomas, Mol One, Thando (single, 2017, independent)
- "My People" - Remi feat. Thando (single, 2018, House of Beige)
- "All That I Got" - Royalty Noise feat. Thando (single, 2018, independent)
