= Anything Like Me (disambiguation) =

"Anything Like Me" is a song by American country music singer Brad Paisley from the albums Hits Alive and American Saturday Night.

Anything Like Me may also refer to:

- Anything Like Me, an EP by Florida Georgia Line
- "Anything Like Me", a song by James Johnston from the album Raised Like That
- "Anything Like Me", a song by Poppy from the album I Disagree
