= Raised Like That =

Studio album by James Johnston
- Released: 29 September 2023
- Genre: Country
- Length: 62:00
- Label: James Johnston Music
- Producers: Gavin Carfoot; James Johnston; MSquared; Liam Quinn; Ilya Toshinskiy; Justin Wantz

James Johnston chronology
Raised Like That (2023)	Where You'll Find Me (2025)

Singles from Raised Like That
- 1. "Raised Like That" Released: 9 July 2021; 2. "Small Town" Released: 19 November 2021; 3. "Anything Like Me" Released: 25 February 2022; 4. "Country Boys" Released: 8 May 2022; 5. "Same Songs" Released: 15 July 2022; 6. "My People" Released: 21 September 2022; 7. "Got It Good" Released: 26 January 2023; 8. "We Grew Up On" Released: 19 April 2022; 9. "Some Things Never Change" Released: 28 July 2023; 10. "Worth Its Weight in Gold" Released: 8 September 2023

Raised Like That is the debut studio album by Australian country singer-songwriter James Johnston. The album was announced on 17 August 2023, and self-released on 29 September 2023. The album is Australia's largest debut country album ever.

Johnston said "The record will make you want to dance, make you want to cry and make you want to turn around and buy a little property in a small town somewhere."

At the 2024 Country Music Awards of Australia, the album was nominated for Album of the Year and Contemporary Country Album of the Year. It was the third top selling Australian country album of 2023. At the 2024 ARIA Music Awards, the album was nominated for Best Country Album.

== Reception ==
The National Tribune said "The stunning debut contains moments that revel in joy and nostalgia, yet dares to dwell on the real hardship and adversity that faces so many people living in the country and on the land" calling Johnston's sound as "modern and unique with driving guitars, pounding drums and his gravelly vocal centre stage".

== Track listing ==
All tracks are written by James Johnston, except where noted.

Raised Like That track listing
No.	Title	Producer(s)	Length
1.	"Raised Like That"	Justin Wantz	3:25
2.	"Keepin It Country"	Gavin Carfoot; Wantz	2:52
3.	"Country Boys"	James Johnston; Liam Quinn; Wantz	3:14
4.	"Small Town Girl"	Wantz	2:52
5.	"This Land Is Killing Me"	Wantz	3:21
6.	"Worth Its Weight in Gold" (writers: Johnston, Nolan Wynne)	Wantz	3:28
7.	"We Grew Up On"	Ilya Toshinskiy	3:16
8.	"Good to Be Back"	Wantz	2:39
9.	"Growing Up"	Wantz	3:41
10.	"Some Things Never Change" (with Zac & George; writers: Johnston, George Goodfellow, Zac Roddy, Nicole Spooner)	Quinn; Wantz	2:49
11.	"Got It Good" (writers: Johnston, Michael DeLorenzis, Melanie Dyer, Michael Paynter)	MSquared	2:53
12.	"Old Country Barn"	Quinn; Wantz	3:05
13.	"Anything Like Me" (writers: Johnston, Wynne)	Carfoot; Wantz	3:35
14.	"Seeing You Soon"	Wantz	3:28
15.	"World Under My Tyres"	Wantz	2:51
16.	"A Country Girl Can"	Wantz	3:21
17.	"Small Town" (writers: Johnston, Wynne)	Carfoot; Wantz	2:40
18.	"Same Songs" (with Kaylee Bell; writers: Johnston, Kaylee Bell, Gavin Carfoot, Jared Porter, Wynne)	Johnston; Quinn; Wantz	2:47
19.	"My People"	Johnston; Wantz	2:55
20.	"I Still Call It Home" (writers: Johnston, Wynne)	Quinn	2:57
Total length:			62:00

== Personnel ==
- Liam Quinn – mastering (tracks 1–6, 9, 10, 12–20), mixing (1–4, 6, 10, 12, 13, 16–18, 20)
- Frank Gagliardi – mastering (8)
- Leon Zervos – mastering (11)
- Justin Wantz – mixing (5, 8, 9, 14, 15, 19)
- Billy Decker – mixing (7)
- MSquared – mixing (11)

== Charts ==
=== Weekly charts ===
Weekly chart performance for Raised Like That
Chart (2023)	Peak position
Australian Albums (ARIA)	7
Australian Country Albums (ARIA)	2

=== Year-end charts ===
Year-end chart performance for Raised Like That
Chart (2023)	Position
Australian Country Albums (ARIA)	39
Chart (2024)	Position
Australian Country Albums (ARIA)	40
Chart (2025)	Position
Australian Country Albums (ARIA)	58
