= Bella Taylor Smith =

Australian musician and singer

- Born: 24 February 1998 (age 28); Sydney, Australia
- Genres: Christian, Pop, folk
- Occupations: Musician, singer
- Instruments: Vocals
- Years active: 2021–present
- Label: EMI Music Australia
- Website: www.bellataylorsmith.com

Bella Taylor Smith (born 24 February 1998) is an Australian musician and singer. In 2021, Taylor Smith took part in the 10th season of The Voice Australia, winning the competition in September 2021 and collecting $100,000 prize money and a recording contract with EMI Music Australia.

== Career ==
=== 2021: The Voice season 10 ===
In 2021, Taylor Smith auditioned for season 10 of The Voice Australia with the song "Ave Maria". All four judges turned for her blind audition and she chose Team Guy Sebastian. The grand final was broadcast on 12 September 2021 with Taylor Smith being decided by a viewer poll.

denotes winner.

The Voice performances and results (2021)
Episode	Song	Original Artist	Result
Audition	"Ave Maria"	Beyoncé	Through to The Cut
The Cut	"Time After Time" (vs Danielle Matthews and Julee-Anne Bell)	Cyndi Lauper	Through to Knockouts
Knockouts	"The Voice Within"	Christina Aguilera	Through to the Semi Final
Semi Final	"Everybody Hurts"	R.E.M.	Saved by Coach. Through to final
Grand Final	"Never Enough"	Loren Allred	Winner
Grand Final	"The Prayer" (with Guy Sebastian)	Celine Dion and Andrea Bocelli	Winner

After receiving the news from host Sonia Kruger, Taylor Smith said "I really can't believe it. I'm so thankful. I can't wait to see what incredible things are ahead for me. I'm really grateful for you [coach Guy], for everyone who voted and for my beautiful family who I love."

Immediately following the announcement of her win, Taylor Smith released her second EP, which was her debut with EMI Music ,The Complete Collection.

=== 2022: Look Me in the Eyes ===
On 28 January 2022, Taylor Smith released "Nice to Know Ya". Upon release she said "We all process broken trust differently. Whether it's between family, friends or romantic partners – each of us are likely to respond in our own unique way. 'Nice to Know Ya' explores differing journeys/ choices the listener may face in deciding the best way forward from that moment of broken trust. If you want to continue to make something work knowing it won't be easy, or if you want to turn around and say 'nice to know ya', no choice is bad, it's just what's right for you." On 18 March 2022, Taylor Smith released "Look Me in the Eyes", the title track from her next extended play.

In March 2023, Taylor Smith released "A Long Time Coming" a track which she co-wrote and produced with her husband Josh Cole.

== Personal life ==
In the pre-audition interview of The Voice, Taylor Smith discussed her background in the church and said "I never really knew why I could sing or what I was going to do with it until I started going to church." She later said "faith is a really important part of my life."

== Discography ==
=== Extended plays ===
List of EPs, with release date, label, and selected chart positions shown
Title	Details	Peak chart positions
Title	Details	AUS
Tell Me How You Really Feel?	Released: 22 July 2021; Label: Bella Taylor; Formats: Digital download, streaming	—
The Complete Collection	Released: 12 September 2021; Label: EMI Australia, Universal Australia; Formats: Digital download, streaming	—
Look Me in the Eyes	Released: 22 April 2022; Label: EMI Australia, Universal Australia; Formats: CD, digital download, streaming	36
The Anita's Sessions	Released: 1 July 2022; Label: EMI Australia, Universal Australia; Formats: digital download, streaming	—

=== Singles ===
List of singles, with year released, album details, and selected chart positions shown
Title	Year	Peak chart positions	Album
Title	Year	AUS	Album
"Higher"	2021	31	The Complete Collection
"Nice to Know Ya"	2022	—	Look Me in the Eyes
"Look Me in the Eyes"	2022	—	Look Me in the Eyes
"A Long Time Coming"	2023	—	TBA
"Small Things"	2023	—	TBA
"Thank You 1000x" (featuring Mitch Wong)	2024	—	TBA

== Awards and nominations ==
=== ARIA Music Awards ===
The ARIA Music Awards is an annual awards ceremony that recognises excellence, innovation, and achievement across all genres of Australian music. They commenced in 1987.

Year	Nominee / work	Award	Result	Ref.
2022	Look Me in the Eyes	Michael Gudinski Breakthrough Artist	Nominated	

Preceded by Chris Sebastian	The Voice winner 2021	Succeeded by Lachie Gill
