= Lane Pittman =

Australian singer-songwriter

- Born: 2007 (age 18–19); Mount Isa, Queensland
- Genres: Country
- Occupations: Singer; songwriter
- Years active: 2022–present
- Label: Chugg Music
- Website: www.lanepittmanofficial.com

Lane Pittman (born 2007) is an Australian country singer-songwriter. Pittman went viral aged 15 with his audition for 2022 season of The Voice Australia, where he sang "Even Though I'm Leaving" by Luke Combs. In 2024, Chugg Music released his self-titled extended play (EP).

== Early life ==
Lane Pittman was born in Mount Isa, Queensland, and raised in Tamworth, New South Wales, known for the Tamworth Country Music Festival. Pittman told Rolling Stone Australia that since joining the choir in primary school, "I kind of always had dreamed of doing music as a job." He did several gigs in 2020 before the COVID-19 lockdowns.

== Career ==
=== 2022: The Voice ===
In April 2022, Pittman auditioned for The Voice with a rendition of "Even Though I'm Leaving" by Luke Combs. He was 15. He did it only because his friends dared him to. Nevertheless, his performance impressed the judges and received millions of views on social media. Pittman joined Keith Urban's team and reached the semi-finals, where he sang "Father and Son". Urban, a country artist, praised him for his authenticity.

The Voice performances and results (2022)
Episode	Song	Original Artist	Result
Audition	"Even Though I'm Leaving"	Luke Combs	Through to The Callbacks
The Callbacks	"Driver's License" (vs Freddie Bailey and Danny Phegan)	Olivia Rodrigo	Through to Battles
Battles	"Edge of Midnight"	Miley Cyrus	Through to Semi Final
Semi Final (5th - 8th)	"Father and Son"	Cat Stevens	Eliminated

=== 2023-present: Lane Pittman and What Now? ===
In 2023, Combs eventually noticed Pittman's viral audition and invited him to open for his world tour's Australian leg. Pittman began playing for larger audiences. In August 2023, he released "Love in a Country Town", followed by "Ain't Too Much to Ask" in November 2023. The two singles appeared on his self-titled, six-track extended play (EP) released by Chugg Music in March 2024. Lane Pittman peaked at #8 on the Australian Artist Albums Chart and #14 on the ARIA Country Albums Chart.

In January 2025, Pittman was also awarded a Golden Guitar Award for New Talent of the Year at the Tamworth Country Music Festival. The same month, Combs invited Pittman back for the Australian and New Zealand shows of his Growin' Up and Gettin' Old Tour (2024–2025). It included some of the biggest shows of Pittman's career, such as Stadium Australia in Sydney. It was also his first time overseas.

In August 2025, Pitmann released the single "Man I'm Turning Out to Be"; a tribute to his father. In April 2026, Pittman released his second EP, What Now?.

== Discography ==
=== Extended plays ===
List of EPs, with selected details
Title	EP details	Peak chart positions	
Title	EP details	AUS Country	AUS Artist Country
Lane Pittman	Released: 8 March 2024; Label: Chugg Music (CHG034); Format: digital download	25	2
What Now?	Released: 10 April 2026; Label: Chugg Music (CHG044); Format: digital download	23	3

== Awards and nominations ==
=== AIR Awards ===
The Australian Independent Record Awards (commonly known informally as AIR Awards) is an annual awards night to recognise, promote and celebrate the success of Australia's Independent Music sector.

Year	Nominee / work	Award	Result	Ref.
2025	Lane Pittman	Best Independent Country Album or EP	Nominated	

=== Country Music Awards of Australia ===
The Country Music Awards of Australia is an annual awards night held in January during the Tamworth Country Music Festival. Celebrating recording excellence in the Australian country music industry. They commenced in 1973.

Year	Nominee / work	Award	Result	Ref.
2025	Lane Pittmann	Male Artist of the Year	Nominated	
2025	Lane Pittmann	New Artist of the Year	Won	
2026	"Amen for the Weekend"	Single of the Year	Nominated	

=== Rolling Stone Australia Awards ===
The Rolling Stone Australia Awards are awarded annually in January or February by the Australian edition of Rolling Stone magazine for outstanding contributions to popular culture in the previous year.

Year	Nominee / work	Award	Result	Ref.
2025	Lane Pittman	Best New Artist	Shortlisted	
