= The Voice (Australian TV series) season 10 =

The Voice
- Season 10
- Promotional poster featuring coaches Ora, Urban, Mauboy, and Sebastian
- Hosted by: Sonia Kruger
- Coaches: Keith Urban; Rita Ora; Jessica Mauboy; Guy Sebastian
- Winner: Bella Taylor Smith
- Winning coach: Guy Sebastian
- Runners-up: Arlo Sim, G-Nat!on and Mick Harrington

Release
- Original network: Seven Network
- Original release: 8 August – 12 September 2021

Season chronology
- ← Previous; Season 9 Next → Season 11

The tenth season of The Voice began airing on 8 August 2021. Due to the acquisition of 21st Century Fox by Disney, Fox Studios has been designated to Disney and Marvel productions, resulting in ITV Studios Australia becoming the new home for The Voice. In August 2020, it was announced Seven Network had picked up the series for its tenth season, set to broadcast in 2021, with Sonia Kruger returning as host. In December of the same year, Seven announced that Guy Sebastian, Jessica Mauboy, Rita Ora, and Keith Urban were the coaches, replacing Boy George, Delta Goodrem and Kelly Rowland.

The grand finale was prerecorded in April 2021, with four different endings being taped. The show was broadcast on 12 September 2021 with the winner, Bella Taylor Smith, being decided by a viewer poll. Smith’s victory marked Guy Sebastian’s first and only win as a coach. For the first time, an artist that had a coach blocked in his/her blind auditions (Guy Sebastian blocking Jessica Mauboy) went on to win an entire Australian season.

== Coaches and Host ==
Coaches and Host of The Voice Season 10

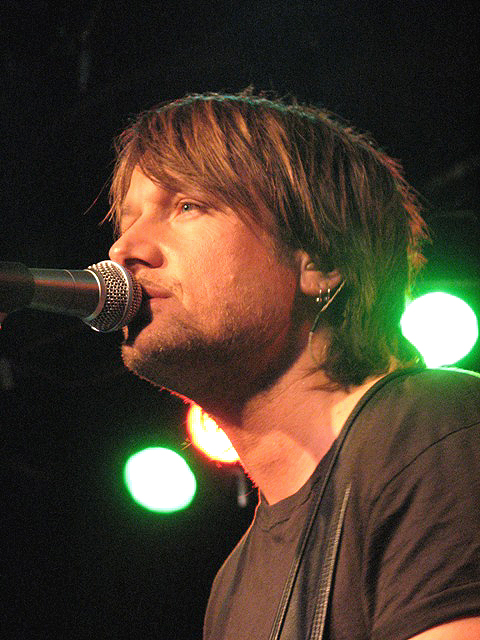
Keith Urban

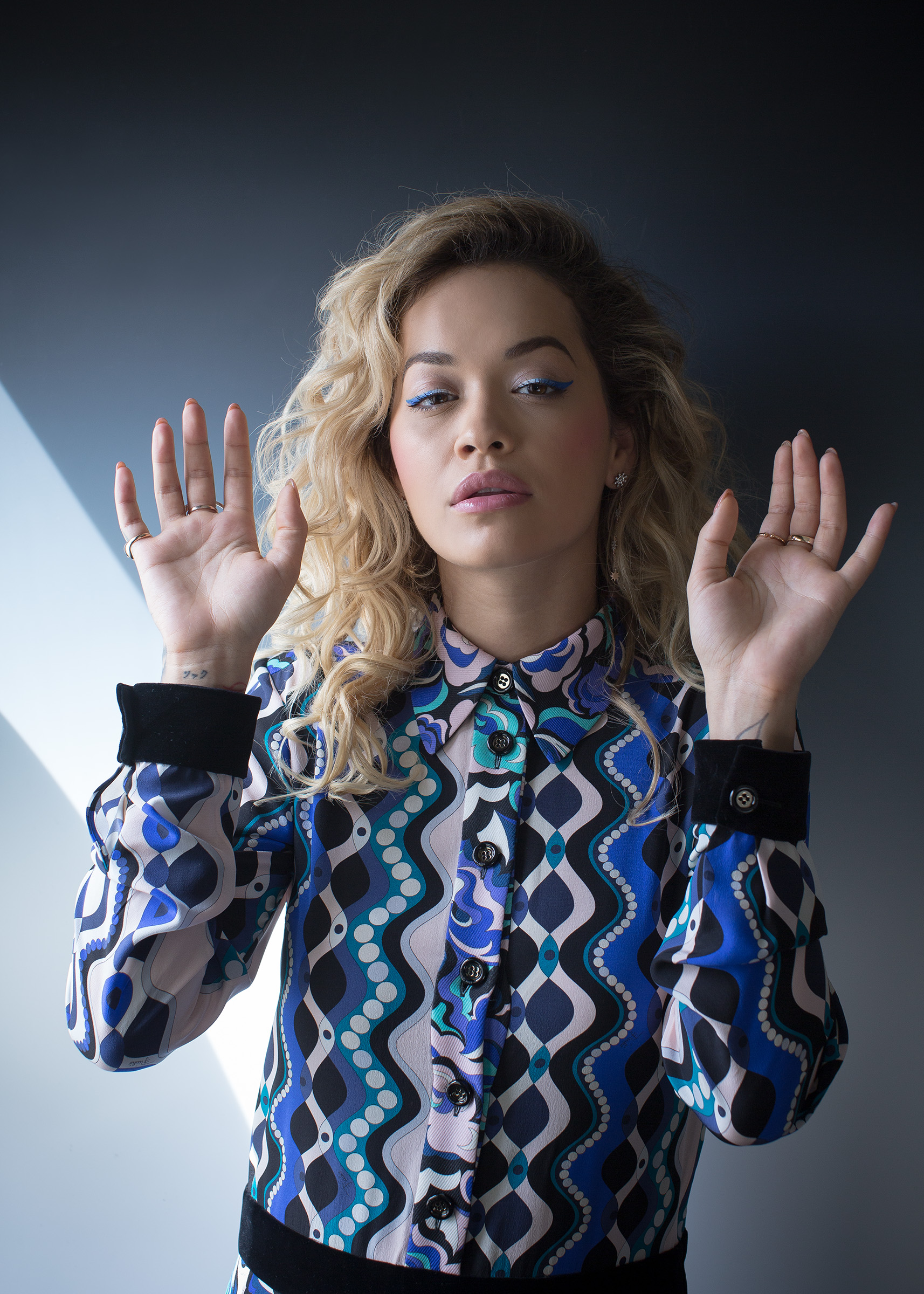
Rita Ora

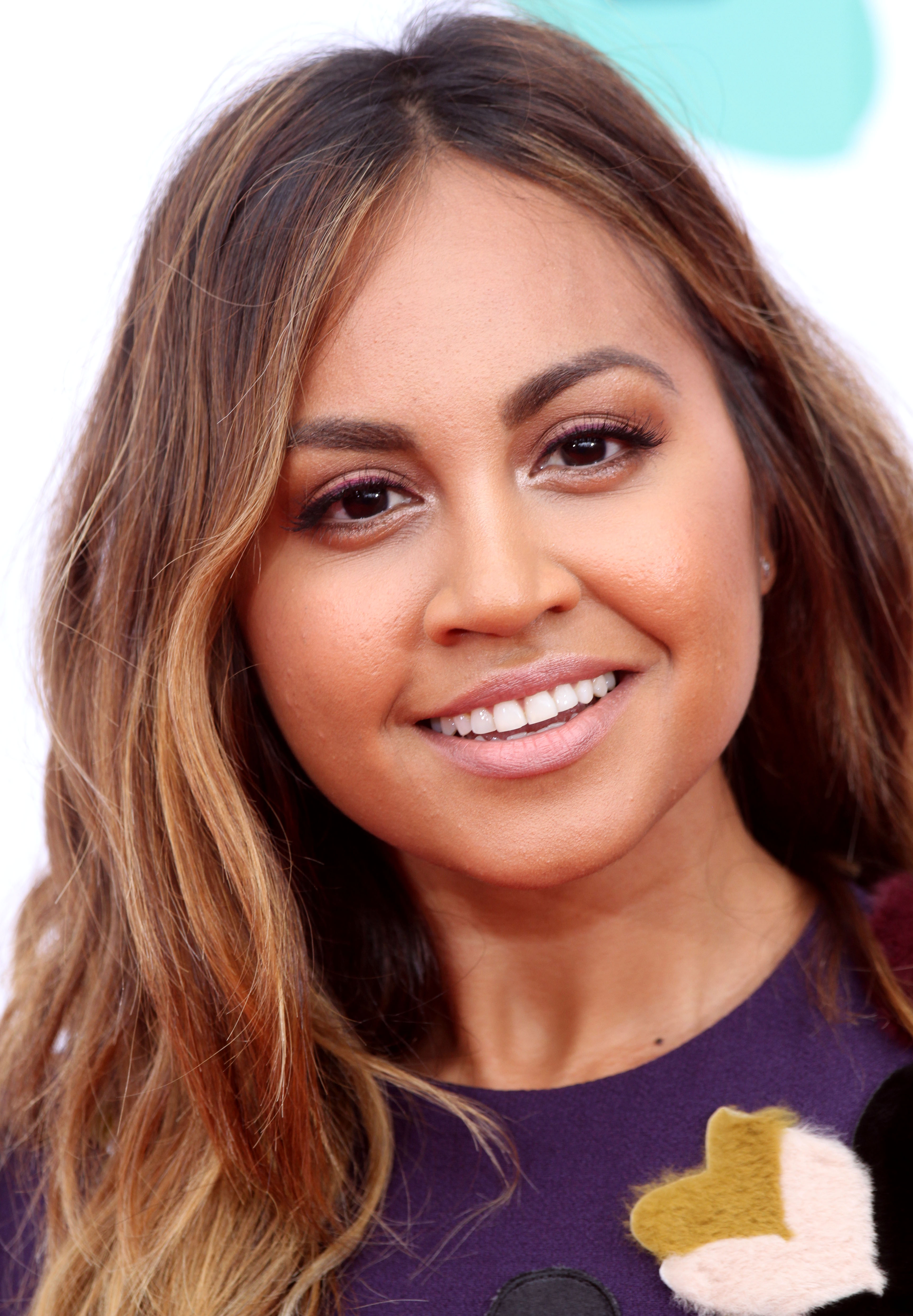
Jessica Mauboy

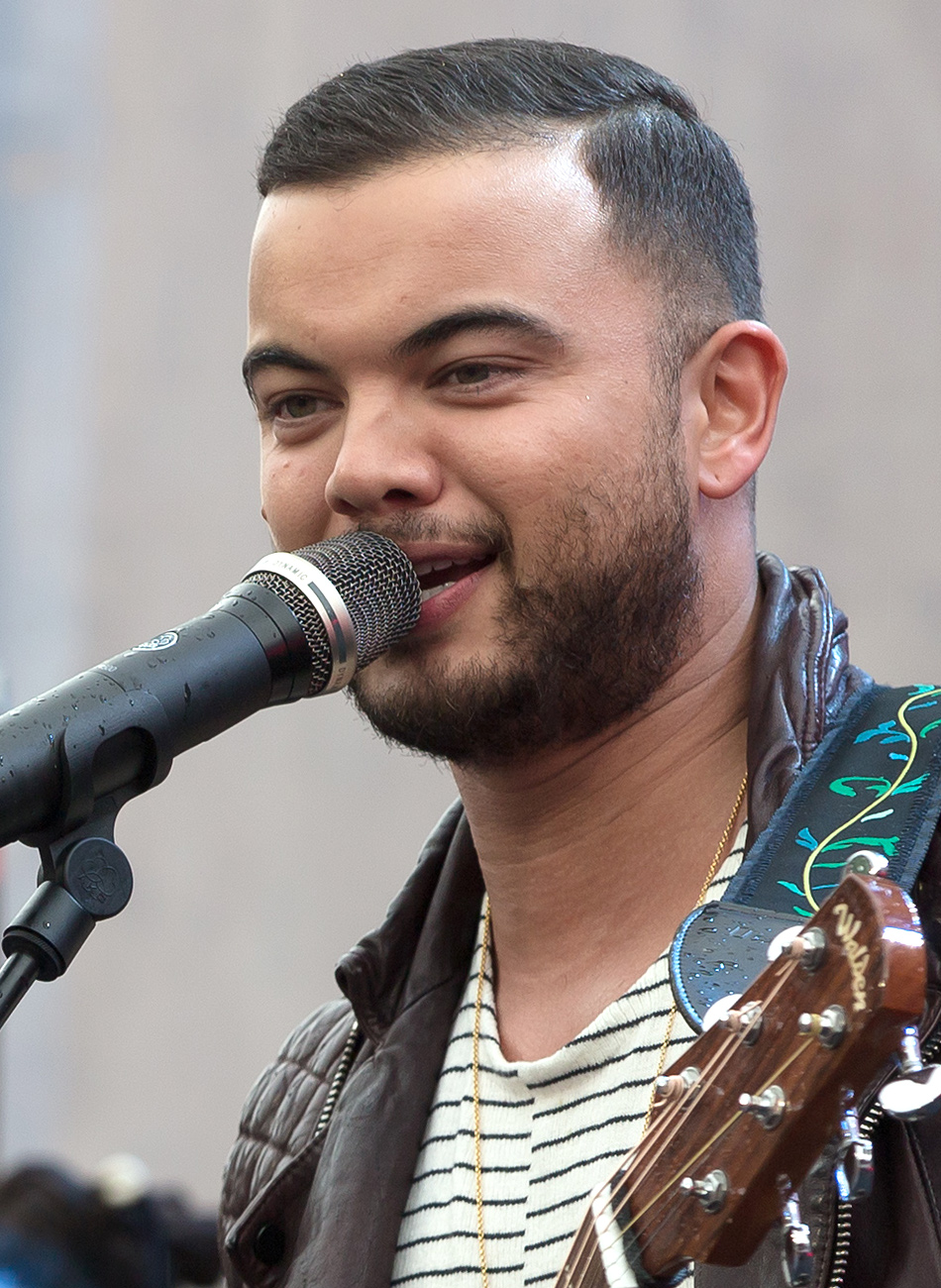
Guy Sebastian

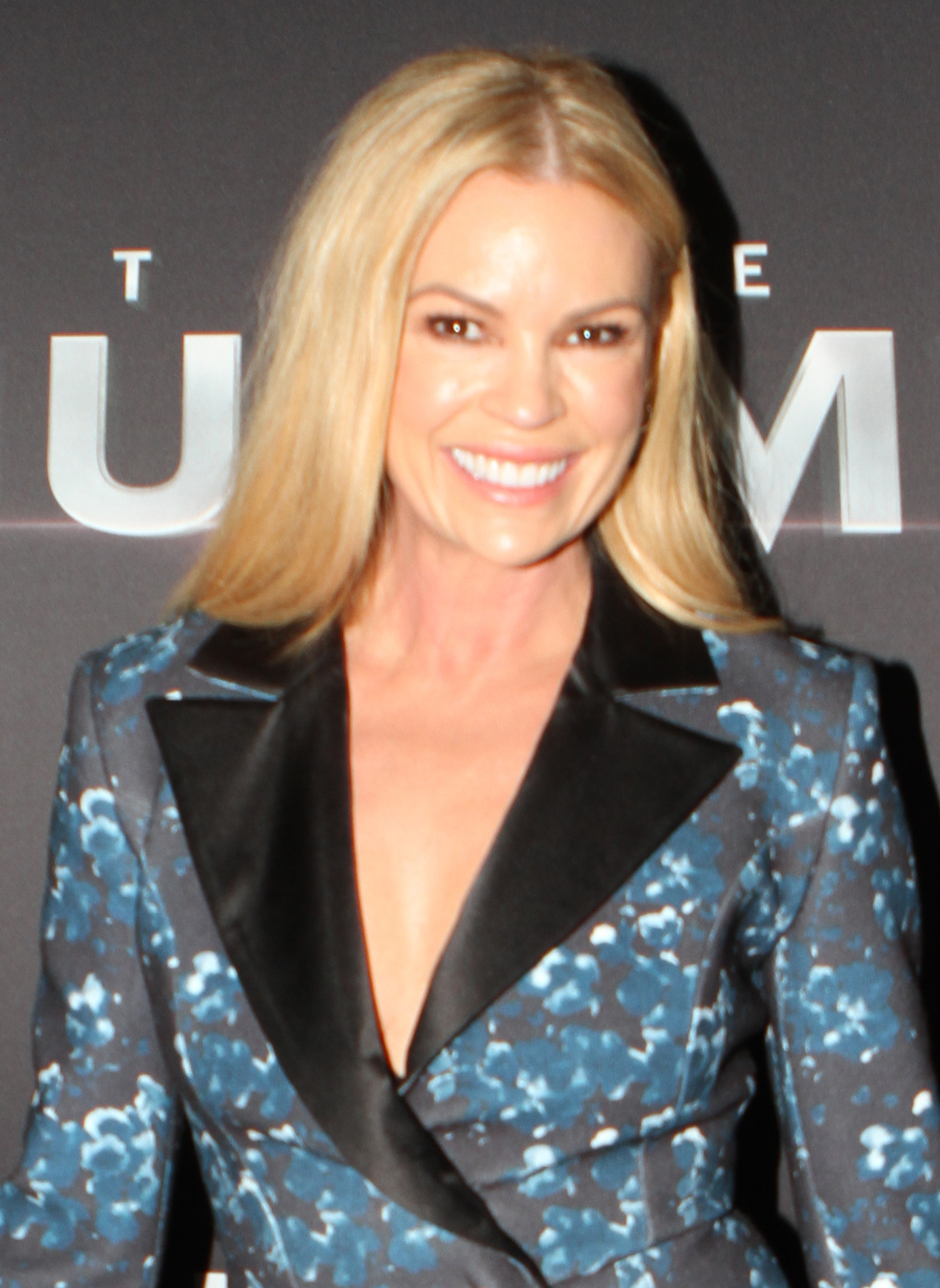
Sonia Kruger

On 15 December 2020, Seven announced Guy Sebastian would continue as a coach; Jessica Mauboy and Rita Ora were named as new coaches, replacing Boy George and Delta Goodrem; and Keith Urban, having last been a coach in the first season, returned to the coaching panel, replacing Kelly Rowland. Sonia Kruger, who left as host following the conclusion of the eighth season, returned as host following the exit of Darren McMullen and Renee Bargh.

== Teams ==
Colour key

- Winner
- Runner-Up
- 3rd place
- 4th place
- Eliminated in the Semifinal
- Eliminated in the Knockouts
- Eliminated in the Cut

Season ten coaching teams
Coach	Top 51 Artists				
Keith Urban					
Keith Urban	Arlo Sim	Lau Abend	Jediael	Cassie McIvor	Lozz Benson
Keith Urban	Darren Constable	Drew Walker	Abbey Green	Dan Eade	Seb Szabo
Keith Urban	JD Smith	Shaun Holton	Cullen Porthill	Brad Myers	
Rita Ora					
Rita Ora	G-Nat!on	Sian Fuller	Sofia Watt	Tanya George	Halimah Kyrgios
Rita Ora	Adrian Jemale	Irena Lysiuk	Rebecca O'Connor	Milina Mihic	Saraya Mauboy-Hudson
Rita Ora	Zeke Cameron	Isaiah Lugo-Hale	Jessica Stokes	Izrael Read	
Jessica Mauboy					
Jessica Mauboy	Mick Harrington	Ella Monnery	Seann Miley Moore	Janaki Easwar	Evile Jireh Sisifo Laloata
Jessica Mauboy	Olivia Vasquez	Pete Murphy	Paris Marie	Kala Gare	Maddie Grace
Jessica Mauboy	Bec Caruana	Lily Bergqvist	Tia Mullins		
Guy Sebastian					
Guy Sebastian	Bella Taylor Smith	Jordan Fuller	Chantel Cofie	Penelope Pettigrew	Adrian Hood
Guy Sebastian	Byron Garn	Kelly Matejcic	Baylie Carson	Julee-Anne Bell	Danielle Matthews

== Blind auditions ==
In the blind auditions this season the coaches complete their teams without a specific number of members. Also, each coach can block another two times; however, the coach who is blocked is unable to pitch for the artist.

Blind auditions colour key
✔	Coach hit the "I WANT YOU" button
	Artist defaulted to this team
	Artist elected to join this team
	Artist eliminated with no coach pressing "I WANT YOU" button
	Artist received a 'Four-Chair Turn'
✘	Coach pressed "I WANT YOU" button, but was blocked by another coach from getting the artist
	Blocked by Keith; Blocked by Rita; Blocked by Jess; Blocked by Guy

Blind auditions results
Episode	Order	Artist	Age	Song	Coach's and artist's choices			
Episode	Order	Artist	Age	Song	Keith	Rita	Jess	Guy
Episode 1 (Sunday, 8 August)	1	Sofia Watt	15	"It's a Man's Man's Man's World"	✔	✔	✔	✔
Episode 1 (Sunday, 8 August)	2	Olivia Vasquez	25	"Sorry Not Sorry"	✔	✔	✔	✔
Episode 1 (Sunday, 8 August)	3	Darren Constable	52	"Fortunate Son"	✔	—	—	✔
Episode 1 (Sunday, 8 August)	4	Drew Walker	22	"Down Under"	✔	✔	✔	✔
Episode 1 (Sunday, 8 August)	5	Joey Chan	55	"Let's Get Loud"	—	—	—	—
Episode 1 (Sunday, 8 August)	6	Byron Garn	18	"Before You Go"	—	✔	✔	✔
Episode 1 (Sunday, 8 August)	7	Bella Taylor Smith	23	"Ave Maria"	✔	✔	✘	✔
Episode 2 (Monday, 9 August)	1	Adrian Hood	39	"1+1"	✔	✔	✔	✔
Episode 2 (Monday, 9 August)	2	Lozz Benson	30	"That Don't Impress Me Much"	✔	—	✔	✔
Episode 2 (Monday, 9 August)	3	Janaki Easwar	12	"lovely"	✔	✔	✔	✔
Episode 2 (Monday, 9 August)	4	Jemma Beech	28	"All Fired Up"	—	—	—	—
Episode 2 (Monday, 9 August)	5	Evile Jireh Sisifo Laloata	20	"Fix You"	✘	✔	✔	✘
Episode 2 (Monday, 9 August)	6	Jordan Fuller	19	"Falling"	✔	✔	✔	✔
Episode 2 (Monday, 9 August)	7	Sian Fuller (Note: Sian Fuller did not apply for The Voice, but was brought in to audition after her brother.)	16	"Bruises"	✔	✔	✔	✔
Episode 3 (Tuesday, 10 August)	1	Tanya George	27	"You've Got The Love"	✔	✔	✔	✔
Episode 3 (Tuesday, 10 August)	2	Abbey Green	23	"How To Be Lonely"	✔	✘	✔	✔
Episode 3 (Tuesday, 10 August)	3	Henry Starr Ahomana	26	"Forever"	—	—	—	—
Episode 3 (Tuesday, 10 August)	4	Dan Eade	29	"Home"	✔	✔	✔	—
Episode 3 (Tuesday, 10 August)	5	Baylie Carson	29	"Bang Bang"	—	—	—	✔
Episode 3 (Tuesday, 10 August)	6	Blair Dwyer	40	"What You Need"	—	—	—	—
Episode 3 (Tuesday, 10 August)	7	Cassie McIvor	29	"It's All Coming Back to Me Now"	✔	✔	✔	✔
Episode 4 (Sunday, 15 August)	1	Jediael	18	"Wonder"	✔	✔	✔	✔
Episode 4 (Sunday, 15 August)	2	Halimah Kyrgios	31	"Chains"	✔	✔	✔	✔
Episode 4 (Sunday, 15 August)	3	Pete Murphy	45	"Drivers License"	—	—	✔	✔
Episode 4 (Sunday, 15 August)	4	Tori Darke	30	"The Middle"	—	—	—	—
Episode 4 (Sunday, 15 August)	5	Adrian Jemale	21	"Billie Jean"	✔	✔	✔	✔
Episode 4 (Sunday, 15 August)	6	Kelly Matejcic	31	"Diamonds"	✔	✔	✔	✔
Episode 4 (Sunday, 15 August)	7	Mick Harrington	32	"Over the Rainbow"	✔	✔	✔	✔
Episode 5 (Monday, 16 August)	1	Julee-Anne Bell	48	"Climb Ev'ry Mountain"	✔	✔	✔	✔
Episode 5 (Monday, 16 August)	2	Irena Lysiuk	29	"On a Night Like This"	✔	✔	✔	—
Episode 5 (Monday, 16 August)	3	Seb Szabo	24	"Dreams"	✔	✔	—	✔
Episode 5 (Monday, 16 August)	4	Paris Marie	17	"Butterfly"	—	—	✔	✔
Episode 5 (Monday, 16 August)	5	Kala Gare	23	"Livin' on a Prayer"	—	✔	✔	✔
Episode 5 (Monday, 16 August)	6	Maddie Grace	21	"Rainbow"	✔	—	✔	✔
Episode 5 (Monday, 16 August)	7	Michael Kay	25	"American Boy"	—	—	—	—
Episode 5 (Monday, 16 August)	8	Chantel Cofie	23	"2020" (original song)	✔	✘	✔	✔
Episode 6 (Tuesday, 17 August)	1	Rebecca O'Connor	45	"Proud Mary"	—	✔	✔	—
Episode 6 (Tuesday, 17 August)	2	Milina Mihic	17	"Castles"	✔	✔	✔	✔
Episode 6 (Tuesday, 17 August)	3	Saraya Mauboy-Hudson	17	"Stay"	—	✔	✔	✔
Episode 6 (Tuesday, 17 August)	4	Brodie Pollard	13	"There's Nothing Holdin' Me Back"	—	—	—	—
Episode 6 (Tuesday, 17 August)	5	Zeke Cameron	19	"Let You Love Me"	—	✔	✔	—
Episode 6 (Tuesday, 17 August)	6	Rory Eliza	18	"Dance Monkey"	—	—	—	—
Episode 6 (Tuesday, 17 August)	7	Seann Miley Moore	28	"The Prayer"	✔	✘	✔	✔
Episode 7 (Sunday, 22 August)	1	G-Nat!on	16-18	"Teeth"	✔	✔	✔	✔
Episode 7 (Sunday, 22 August)	2	Bec Caruana	45	"Everybody's Free"	—	✔	✔	—
Episode 7 (Sunday, 22 August)	3	JD Smith	36	"Hello"	✔	—	✔	✔
Episode 7 (Sunday, 22 August)	4	Lau Abend	21	"You Broke Me First"	✔	✔	✔	✔
Episode 7 (Sunday, 22 August)	5	Aaron Lee	28	"My Heart Will Go On"	—	—	—	—
Episode 7 (Sunday, 22 August)	6	Danielle Matthews	37	"Zero Gravity"	—	✔	✔	✔
Episode 7 (Sunday, 22 August)	7	Arlo Sim	18	"My Mind"	✔	✔	✔	✔
Episode 8 (Monday, 23 August)	1	Isaiah Lugo-Hale	21	"Can't Hold Us"	—	✔	✔	✘
Episode 8 (Monday, 23 August)	2	Lily Bergqvist	14	"Candle in the Wind"	—	—	✔	—
Episode 8 (Monday, 23 August)	3	Jessica Stokes	31	"Love Don't Cost a Thing"	—	✔	✔	—
Episode 8 (Monday, 23 August)	4	Shaun Holton	35	"Best of You"	✔	—	—	—
Episode 8 (Monday, 23 August)	5	Tiffany Dell	23	"Love Yourself"	—	—	—	—
Episode 8 (Monday, 23 August)	6	Izrael Read	18	"Heart of Glass"	—	✔	—	—
Episode 8 (Monday, 23 August)	7	Cullen Porthill	17	"Monster"	✔	—	—	—
Episode 8 (Monday, 23 August)	8	Brad Myers	44	"Flame Trees"	✔	—	✔	—
Episode 8 (Monday, 23 August)	9	Ella Monnery	24	"Little Things"	✔	✔	✔	✔
Episode 9 (Tuesday, 24 August)	1	Tia Mullins	18	"We Don't Have to Take Our Clothes Off"	✔	✔	✔	✔
Episode 9 (Tuesday, 24 August)	2	Angus Milne	35	"Castle on the Hill"	—	—	—	—
Episode 9 (Tuesday, 24 August)	3	Penelope Pettigrew	32	"Alive"	✔	✔	✘	✔

== The Cut ==
In the Cut (filmed in the day after the blind auditions), each artist must immediately face their coach to prove their star power. The coaches divide their teams in groups of a specific theme and the contestants battle it out singing the same song. Each coach can only take five artists through to the Knockouts.

The Cut colour key
Artist was chosen to advance to the Knockouts
Artist was eliminated

The Cut results
Episode	Order	Coach	Theme	Song	Winner(s)	Loser(s)
Episode 9 (Tuesday, 24 August)	1	Rita	Singers finding themselves	"Respect"	Halimah Kyrgios	Rebecca O'Connor
Episode 9 (Tuesday, 24 August)	1	Rita	Singers finding themselves	"Respect"	Halimah Kyrgios	Irena Lysiuk
Episode 9 (Tuesday, 24 August)	2	Rita	Dancers	"Juice"	G-Nat!on	Jessica Stokes
Episode 9 (Tuesday, 24 August)	2	Rita	Dancers	"Juice"	G-Nat!on	Adrian Jemale
Episode 9 (Tuesday, 24 August)	3	Rita	Pop singers	"Dancing On My Own"	Sian Fuller	Izrael Read
Episode 9 (Tuesday, 24 August)	3	Rita	Pop singers	"Dancing On My Own"	Sian Fuller	Zeke Cameron
Episode 9 (Tuesday, 24 August)	3	Rita	Pop singers	"Dancing On My Own"	Sofia Watt	Saraya Mauboy-Hudson
Episode 9 (Tuesday, 24 August)	3	Rita	Pop singers	"Dancing On My Own"	Sofia Watt	Milina Mihic
Episode 9 (Tuesday, 24 August)	4	Rita	Most original	Originals	Tanya George	Isaiah Lugo-Hale
Episode 9 (Tuesday, 24 August)	5	Keith	Blues	"Nothing Breaks Like a Heart"	Lozz Benson	Drew Walker
Episode 9 (Tuesday, 24 August)	5	Keith	Blues	"Nothing Breaks Like a Heart"	Lozz Benson	Dan Eade
Episode 9 (Tuesday, 24 August)	5	Keith	Blues	"Nothing Breaks Like a Heart"	Lozz Benson	Brad Myers
Episode 9 (Tuesday, 24 August)	5	Keith	Blues	"Nothing Breaks Like a Heart"	Lozz Benson	Darren Constable
Episode 9 (Tuesday, 24 August)	6	Keith	Vocal storytellers	"Video Games"	Jediael	
Episode 9 (Tuesday, 24 August)	6	Keith	Vocal storytellers	"Video Games"	Arlo Sim	
Episode 9 (Tuesday, 24 August)	7	Keith	Pop singers	"Somebody That I Used to Know"	Lau Abend	Seb Szabo
Episode 9 (Tuesday, 24 August)	7	Keith	Pop singers	"Somebody That I Used to Know"	Lau Abend	Cullen Porthill
Episode 9 (Tuesday, 24 August)	7	Keith	Pop singers	"Somebody That I Used to Know"	Lau Abend	Abbey Green
Episode 9 (Tuesday, 24 August)	8	Keith	Big voices	"Wrecking Ball"	Cassie McIvor	Shaun Holton
Episode 9 (Tuesday, 24 August)	8	Keith	Big voices	"Wrecking Ball"	Cassie McIvor	JD Smith
Episode 9 (Tuesday, 24 August)	9	Guy	Singer-songwriters	"Say You Won't Let Go"	Adrian Hood	
Episode 9 (Tuesday, 24 August)	9	Guy	Singer-songwriters	"Say You Won't Let Go"	Chantel Cofie	
Episode 9 (Tuesday, 24 August)	10	Guy	Pop singers	"This City"	Jordan Fuller	Byron Garn
Episode 9 (Tuesday, 24 August)	10	Guy	Pop singers	"This City"	Jordan Fuller	Kelly Matejcic
Episode 9 (Tuesday, 24 August)	11	Guy	Technical singers	"Into the Unknown"	Penelope Pettigrew	Baylie Carson
Episode 9 (Tuesday, 24 August)	12	Guy	Soulful singers	"Time After Time"	Bella Taylor Smith	Danielle Matthews
Episode 9 (Tuesday, 24 August)	12	Guy	Soulful singers	"Time After Time"	Bella Taylor Smith	Julee-Anne Bell
Episode 9 (Tuesday, 24 August)	13	Jess	Ballad singers	"Shallow"	Evile Jireh Sisifo Laloata	Pete Murphy
Episode 9 (Tuesday, 24 August)	14	Jess	Four-chair turns	"Sweet Dreams (Are Made of This)"	Mick Harrington	
Episode 9 (Tuesday, 24 August)	14	Jess	Four-chair turns	"Sweet Dreams (Are Made of This)"	Seann Miley Moore	
Episode 9 (Tuesday, 24 August)	15	Jess	Young singers	"Ain't Nobody"	Janaki Easwar	Tia Mullins
Episode 9 (Tuesday, 24 August)	15	Jess	Young singers	"Ain't Nobody"	Janaki Easwar	Paris Marie
Episode 9 (Tuesday, 24 August)	15	Jess	Young singers	"Ain't Nobody"	Janaki Easwar	Maddie Grace
Episode 9 (Tuesday, 24 August)	15	Jess	Young singers	"Ain't Nobody"	Janaki Easwar	Lily Bergqvist
Episode 9 (Tuesday, 24 August)	16	Jess	Massive voices	"One Night Only"	Ella Monnery	Kala Gare
Episode 9 (Tuesday, 24 August)	16	Jess	Massive voices	"One Night Only"	Ella Monnery	Olivia Vasquez
Episode 9 (Tuesday, 24 August)	16	Jess	Massive voices	"One Night Only"	Ella Monnery	Bec Caruana

== Knockouts ==
In the knockouts, each artist must perform to their coach. After each act performs, the coaches have three options: to either send the artist straight to the semi-final, send the artist home, or make a decision at the end of the show when all artists have performed. Each coach can only take two artists through to the semis.

Knockouts color key
Artist was sent straight to the semi-final
Artist advanced to the semi-final at the end of the episode
Artist was eliminated at the end of the episode
Artist was immediately eliminated

Knockout results
Episode	Order	Coach	Artist	Song
Episode 10 (Sunday, 29 August)	1	Keith	Cassie McIvor	"Skyfall"
Episode 10 (Sunday, 29 August)	2	Guy	Jordan Fuller	"Anyone"
Episode 10 (Sunday, 29 August)	3	Keith	Jediael	"Attention"
Episode 10 (Sunday, 29 August)	4	Keith	Arlo Sim	"Idontwannabeyouanymore"
Episode 10 (Sunday, 29 August)	5	Guy	Adrian Hood	"Try a Little Tenderness"
Episode 10 (Sunday, 29 August)	6	Keith	Lau Abend	"Adore You"
Episode 10 (Sunday, 29 August)	7	Guy	Penelope Pettigrew	"This Ain't Love"
Episode 10 (Sunday, 29 August)	8	Keith	Lozz Benson	"The Chain"
Episode 10 (Sunday, 29 August)	9	Guy	Chantel Cofie	"A Thousand Miles"
Episode 10 (Sunday, 29 August)	10	Guy	Bella Taylor Smith	"The Voice Within"
Episode 11 (Monday, 30 August)	1	Rita	G-Nat!on	"Bye Bye Bye"
Episode 11 (Monday, 30 August)	2	Jess	Seann Miley Moore	"Lonely"
Episode 11 (Monday, 30 August)	3	Rita	Sian Fuller	"Complicated"
Episode 11 (Monday, 30 August)	4	Jess	Ella Monnery	"Stupid Love"
Episode 11 (Monday, 30 August)	5	Rita	Tanya George	"Royals"
Episode 11 (Monday, 30 August)	6	Jess	Evile Jireh Sisifo Laloata	"Higher Love"
Episode 11 (Monday, 30 August)	7	Rita	Sofia Watt	"Issues"
Episode 11 (Monday, 30 August)	8	Jess	Janaki Easwar	"Dusk Till Dawn"
Episode 11 (Monday, 30 August)	9	Rita	Halimah Kyrgios	"This Is Me"
Episode 11 (Monday, 30 August)	10	Jess	Mick Harrington	"I'm with You"

== Finals ==
=== Semi-final ===
The Semi-finals episode was first broadcast on 5 September 2021. At the end of the episode, the coaches were allowed to take one artist each through to the Grand Finale.

Semi-final results
Order	Coach	Contestant	Song	Result
1	Keith	Arlo Sim	"Somewhere Only We Know"	Saved By Coach
2	Rita	G-Nat!on	"7 Rings"	Saved By Coach
3	Guy	Jordan Fuller	"Head & Heart"	Eliminated
4	Jess	Mick Harrington	"Superman"	Saved By Coach
5	Keith	Lau Abend	"Lose You to Love Me"	Eliminated
6	Jess	Ella Monnery	"Symphony"	Eliminated
7	Rita	Sian Fuller	"Drivers License"	Eliminated
8	Guy	Bella Taylor Smith	"Everybody Hurts"	Saved By Coach

=== Grand Finale ===
The Grand Finale was broadcast on 12 September 2021. Each artist performed a solo song and a duet with their coach. Similar to last season, this was the only episode of the season where the results were determined by public vote and not by the coaches. With Bella Taylor Smith winning, this marks Guy's first win on The Voice.

Finale results
Coach	Contestant	Order	Solo song	Order	Duet song	Result
Keith Urban	Arlo Sim	5	"Youngblood"	1	"Heroes"	Runner-Up
Rita Ora	G-Nat!on	2	"Run the World (Girls)"	6	"Express Yourself"	3rd Place
Guy Sebastian	Bella Taylor Smith	3	"Never Enough"	7	"The Prayer"	Winner
Jessica Mauboy	Mick Harrington	8	"How Do I Live"	4	"Solid Rock"	4th Place

== Contestants who appeared on previous season or TV shows ==
- Tanya George auditioned for season 4 of the show and didn't turn a chair.
- Pete Murphy auditioned for season 3 of The X Factor and didn't make it to the live shows.
- Seann Miley Moore competed on season 12 of The X Factor UK and placed in tenth.
- Ella Monnery competed on the show's previous season and won the battle rounds. Although, left to New Zealand when borders shut from COVID-19 pandemic.
- Penelope Pettigrew auditioned on the show's previous season with no chair turned.
- Adrian Hood competed on season 2 of Australian Idol and was eliminated in the Wild Cards
- Brodie Pollard appeared in Creative Generation – State Schools Onstage from 2021 to 2024, and auditioned for season 10 of ‘‘The Voice Australia’’ in 2021 but did not turn a chair. Brodie is now better known for their drag persona, ‘’Nikita Nessence’’.

== Ratings ==
Colour key:

– Highest rating during the season
– Lowest rating during the season

The Voice season ten consolidated viewership and adjusted position
Episode		Original airdate	Timeslot	Total Metro Viewers (millions)	Night Rank	Source
1	"The Blind Auditions"	8 August 2021	Sunday 7:00 pm	1.329	2	
2	"The Blind Auditions"	9 August 2021	Monday 7:30 pm	1.162	3	
3	"The Blind Auditions"	10 August 2021	Tuesday 7:30 pm	1.066	4	
4	"The Blind Auditions"	15 August 2021	Sunday 7:00 pm	1.226	2	
5	"The Blind Auditions"	16 August 2021	Monday 7:30 pm	1.158	4	
6	"The Blind Auditions"	17 August 2021	Tuesday 7:30 pm	1.165	2	
7	"The Blind Auditions"	22 August 2021	Sunday 7:00 pm	1.177	2	
8	"The Blind Auditions"	23 August 2021	Monday 7:30 pm	1.113	4	
9	"Blind Auditions/The Cut"	24 August 2021	Tuesday 7:30 pm	1.108	3	
10	"The Knockouts"	29 August 2021	Sunday 7:00 pm	1.167	2	
11	"The Knockouts"	30 August 2021	Monday 7:30 pm	1.006	5	
12	"The Semi-Final"	5 September 2021	Sunday 7:00 pm	1.088	3	
13	"The Grand Finale"	12 September 2021	Sunday 7:00 pm	1.292	2	
13	"Winner Announced"	12 September 2021	Sunday 7:00 pm	1.383	1	
