= James Johnston (Australian musician) =

Australian singer

- Born: 26 November 1990 (age 35); Wingham, New South Wales, Australia
- Genre: Country
- Occupation: Singer
- Instruments: Vocals; guitar
- Years active: 2009–present
- Website: jamesjohnston.com

James Johnston (born 26 November 1990) is an Australian singer. In 2009, Johnston placed third in the seventh season of Australian Idol. In 2014, he made the top 24 of the sixth season of The X Factor (Australia).

In July 2021, Johnston released his debut single "Raised Like That". It became the fastest ever debut single by an Australian-based country artist to reach 1 million streams. "Raised Like That" was certified gold in Australia by mid-2022, and in doing so, Johnston became first independent country artist to achieve the milestone in 21 years. Johnston's debut studio album was released on 29 September 2023.

== Early life ==
James Johnston was born on 26 November 1990 in Wingham, New South Wales. Johnston spent his early years travelling farm-to-farm with his dad, selling and servicing tractors and was introduced to artists like Johnny Cash, Waylon Jennings and Garth Brooks from an early age. Johnston performed for the first time at four years of age, singing "Friends in Low Places" in front of his kindergarten class.

Throughout his teens, Johnston busked on the streets of Tamworth and performed in various bands and on many stages.

He was a part of the Star Struck school spectacular event in Newcastle, NSW in 2005.

== Career ==
=== 2009: Australian Idol ===
In 2009, Johnston auditioned for the seventh season of Australian Idol, singing John Mayer's "Your Body Is a Wonderland" at his audition, receiving praise from all four judges. Johnston eventually placed third behind Stan Walker and Hayley Warner.

Australian Idol performances and results (2009)
Episode	Song	Original Artist	Result
Audition	"Your Body Is a Wonderland"	John Mayer	Through to Theatre Week
Theatre Week 1	"You'll Never Walk Alone"	from the show Carousel	Safe
Theatre Week 2	"No Such Thing"	John Mayer	Through to top 24
Top 24	"Crazy"	Gnarls Barkley	Through to top 12
Top 12 (Contestant's Choice)	"How to Save a Life"	The Fray	Safe
Top 11 (Rock Night)	"Thnks Fr Th Mmrs"	Fall Out Boy	Safe
Top 10 (Top 10 Hits)	"Drops of Jupiter (Tell Me)"	Train	Safe
Top 9 (1980s)	"The Power of Love"	Huey Lewis and the News	Safe
Top 8 (P!nk Hits)	"Who Knew"	P!nk	Safe
Top 7 (Big Band)	"Fever"	Peggy Lee	Safe
Top 6 (Movie / Theatre Night)	"Crazy Little Thing Called Love"	Queen	Safe
Top 6 (Movie / Theatre Night)	"You'll Never Walk Alone"	from the show Carousel	Safe
Top 5 (Contestant's Choice)	"Mercy"	Duffy	Safe
Top 5 (Contestant's Choice)	"Use Somebody"	Kings of Leon	Safe
Top 4 (Noughties Week)	"Daughters"	John Mayer	Safe
Top 4 (Noughties Week)	"This Is How a Heart Breaks"	Rob Thomas	Safe
Top 3 (Power Anthems)	"More Than Words"	Extreme	Eliminated
Top 3 (Power Anthems)	"This Is How a Heart Breaks"	Rob Thomas	Eliminated
Top 3 (Power Anthems)	"Learn to Fly"	Foo Fighters	Eliminated

Following his Idol experience, Johnston bought a van and travelled around country Australia, living show-to-show for a number of years.

In May 2010, Johnston released the single "Rollercoaster".

=== 2014: X Factor ===
In 2014, Johnston auditioned for the sixth season of The X Factor (Australian TV series). He made the top 24, but was eliminated before making the live shows.

The X Factor performances and results (2014)
Episode	Song	Original Artist	Result
Audition	"Roar"	Katy Perry	Through to Super Boot Camp
Super Boot Camp 1	"You're Nobody 'til Somebody Loves You" (Group performance)	James Arthur	Through to Super Boot Camp 2
Super Boot Camp 2	"Hold On We're Going Home" (Solo performance)	Drake	Through to Home Visits
Home Visits (Top 24)	"Something I Need"	OneRepublic	Eliminated

Following The X Factor, Johnston travelled through Nashville, Tennessee with a friend. Johnston told Country Town in November 2021, "We were staying in this hostel that had this old piano. Everyone would go to bed at one o'clock in the morning, and I just stayed there for three or four hours writing songs … I've never been so inspired to create and truly, from that moment on, I was like, 'country music, that's where my heart', just songwriting and telling stories."

=== 2020–2023: Raised Like That ===
In eighteen months between 2020 and 2021, Johnston wrote over 200 songs. On 9 July 2021, Johnston released his debut single "Raised Like That" which tells the story of community, integrity, and a celebration to a way of life of people who grew up in a small close knit community.

On 21 July 2021, Johnston reached out for his social community to create a video showing themselves "Raised Like That". Johnston personally edited the video and released it on 1 September 2021. In October 2021, the song peaked at number 1 on the Countrytown Music Network Hot 50 Country Airplay Chart and number 4 on the Australian Independent chart. It was certified gold by the Australian Recording Industry Association (ARIA) in 2022.

Johnston released his second single "Small Town" on 19 November 2021. On the writing of the song, Johnston said "I wrote 'Small Town' on the drive back home to my hometown of Wingham. I had been spending quite some time in the city and I was just so excited to get back to my family farm. I wanted to capture that feeling of excitement and anticipation in the song – that build up as I was on that drive to get back home." In August 2023, Johnston announced the release of his debut studio album, Raised Like That, scheduled for release on 29 September 2023.

=== 2024: Signed with Warner and Where You'll Find Me ===
In September 2024, Johnston confirmed he had signed with Warner Music Australia and released the single "Blame". In August 2025, Johnston announced the forthcoming release of his second studio album, Where You'll Find Me.

== Style ==
In November 2021, Johnston said "I grew up singing country music up until about 16. But I feel I truly developed my style when I went off and tried lots of different genres (played in a funk band, wrote indie acoustic music, played rock 'n' roll covers). So when I finally came home to country at about 25, my upbringing was rooted in country music and songwriting but I got to pull from all different genres to craft my own unique sound."

In November 2021, Johnston further elaborated with Country Town saying "When I did Idol and The X Factor, I always felt like I was kind of playing a character of sorts and it felt so disingenuous. I was young when I did Australian Idol. I didn't know myself, and I would never have called myself an artist at that stage. I was a singer that loved to sing songs. So, for me, I didn't mind getting pushed and pulled in different directions."

== Discography ==
=== Albums ===
List of albums, with selected details and chart positions
Title	Details	Peak chart positions
Title	Details	AUS
Raised Like That	Released: 29 September 2023; Format: CD, 2×LP, digital; Label: James Johnston	7
Where You'll Find Me	Released: 24 October 2025; Format: CD, LP, digital; Label: James Johnston, Warner	5

=== Charted or certified Singles ===
List of charted or certified singles with selected chart positions
Title	Year	Peak chart positions	Certifications	Album
Title	Year	NZ Hot	Certifications	Album
"Raised Like That"	2021	—	ARIA: Platinum	Raised Like That
"Country Is for Me" (with Appel)	2024	30		Where You'll Find Me

== Awards and nominations ==
=== APRA Awards ===
The APRA Awards are held in Australia and New Zealand by the Australasian Performing Right Association to recognise songwriting skills, sales and airplay performance by its members annually.

Year	Nominee / work	Award	Result	Ref.
2023	"Raised Like That"	Most Performed Country Work of the Year	Nominated	
2024	"Got it Good"	Most Performed Country Work of the Year	Nominated	
2024	"Same Songs" (with Kaylee Bell)	Most Performed Country Work of the Year	Nominated	
2025	"Some Things Never Change" (with Zac & George)	Most Performed Country Work of the Year	Nominated	

=== ARIA Music Awards ===
The ARIA Music Awards is an annual award ceremony event celebrating the Australian music industry.

Year	Nominee / work	Award	Result	Ref.
2024	Raised Like That	Best Country Album	Nominated	
2026	Jared Hinz for James Johnston – "One More"	Best Video	Nominated	

=== Bokkies ===
The Bokkies are an award show, organised by South Africa's Bok Radio.

Year	Nominee / work	Award	Result	Ref.
2025	"Country Is for Me" (with Appel)	Song of the Year	Won	

=== Country Music Association Awards ===
The Country Music Association Awards are presented in Nashville annually by the Country Music Association to honour outstanding achievement in the country music industry. Johnston has received one nomination.

Year	Association	Award	For	Result	Ref.
2026	Country Music Association Awards	Global Country Artist Award	Himself	Pending	

=== Country Music Awards of Australia ===
The Country Music Awards of Australia is an annual awards night held in January during the Tamworth Country Music Festival. Celebrating recording excellence in the Australian country music industry. They commenced in 1973.

Year	Nominee / work	Award	Result	Ref.
2023	"Small Town"	Single of the Year	Nominated	
2023	"Small Town"	Song of the Year	Nominated	
2023	"Small Town" (directed by Elijah Cavanagh)	Video of the Year	Nominated	
2023	"Same Songs" (with Kaylee Bell)	Vocal Collaboration of the Year	Won	
2023	James Johnston	New Talent of the Year	Won	
2023	James Johnston	Male Artist of the Year	Nominated	
2024	Raised Like That	Album of the Year	Nominated	
2024	Raised Like That	Contemporary Country of the Year	Nominated	
2024	"Got It Good"	Single of the Year	Nominated	
2024	"We Grew Up On" (directed by Jay Seeney)	Video of the Year	Nominated	
2024	"Some Things Never Change" (with Zac & George)	Vocal Collaboration of the Year	Nominated	
2024	James Johnston	Male Artist of the Year	Nominated	
2025	"Who I Am" (with Lee Kernaghan)	Vocal Collaboration of the Year	Nominated	
2025	"Who I Am" (with Lee Kernaghan)	Song of the Year	Nominated	
2025	"Who I Am" (with Lee Kernaghan)	Single of the Year	Nominated	
2025	"Who I Am" (with Lee Kernaghan)	Video of the Year	Nominated	
2026	James Johnston	Male Artist of the Year	Nominated	
2026	"Good for Me"	Single of the Year	Nominated	
2026	"Back in the Day" (James Johnston, Morgan Evans)	Song of the Year	Nominated	
2026	"I Oughta Know Better" (directed by Jay Seeney)	Music Video of the Year	Nominated	
2026	Where You'll Find Me	Top Selling Album of the Year	Won	
2027	"One More"	Song of the Year	Pending	
2027	"One More"	Single of the Year	Pending	
2027	"Smoke I've Known" (with Chase Matthew)	Vocal Collaboration of the Year	Pending	
2027	James Johnston	Male Artist of the Year	Pending	
2027	Where You'll Find Me	Contemporary Country Album of the Year	Pending	
2027	Where You'll Find Me	Album of the Year	Pending	

=== Queensland Music Awards ===
The Queensland Music Awards (previously known as the Q Song Awards) are an annual awards ceremony celebrating Queensland's brightest emerging artists and established legends. They commenced in 2006.

Year	Nominee / work	Award	Result	Ref.
2023	"Country Boys"	Country Award	Won	

=== Rolling Stone Australia Awards ===
The Rolling Stone Australia Awards are awarded annually in January or February by the Australian edition of Rolling Stone magazine for outstanding contributions to popular culture in the previous year.

Year	Nominee / work	Award	Result	Ref.
2023	James Johnston	Best New Artist	Nominated	
