= Where You'll Find Me =

Studio album by James Johnston
- Released: 24 October 2025
- Length: 48:19
- Label: Warner Australia
- Producer: Jared Adlam

James Johnston chronology
Raised Like That (2023)	Where You'll Find Me (2025)

Singles from Where You'll Find Me
- 1. "Blame" Released: 13 September 2024; 2. "Country Is for Me" Released: 25 October 2024; 3. "Hell Boy" Released: 24 January 2025; 4. "Back in the Day" Released: 23 May 2025; 5. "Good for Me" Released: 4 July 2025; 6. "Where You'll Find Me" Released: 15 August 2025; 7. "I Oughta Know Better" Released: 12 September 2025

Where You'll Find Me is the second studio album by Australian country singer-songwriter James Johnston. The album was announced on 15 August 2025, and released on 24 October 2025 via Warner Music Australia.

Johnston made the album with mentor Morgan Evans and producer Jared Adlam. Johnston said, "It's rare you find people that are really aligned with you. I just got to hang out with my buddies and it's by far the most fun I've ever had making music."

The album was supported by an Australian tour in October and November 2025.

At the 2026 Country Music Awards of Australia, it won Top Selling Album of the Year. At the 2027 Country Music Awards, it was nominated for Contemporary Country Album of the Year and Album of the Year.

== Reception ==
The Note said "the album is 16 tracks of upbeat country pop".

== Track listing ==
Where You'll Find Me track listing
No.	Title	Writer(s)	Length
1.	"Where You'll Find Me"	James Johnston; Jared Adlam; Gavin Carfoot; Daymon Osborn; Nolan Wynne	2:58
2.	"One More"	Johnston; Morgan Evans	2:49
3.	"I Oughta Know Better"	Johnston; Adlam	3:26
4.	"Back in the Day"	Johnston; Evans	2:48
5.	"Sounds Good to Me"	Johnston	3:01
6.	"Good for Me"	Johnston; Ben Horsley	2:41
7.	"Dirty Dancing"	Johnston; Ben Goldsmith; Osborn	3:05
8.	"Country Is for Me" (with Appel)	Johnston; Christoph Kotzé	3:00
9.	"Everything Right Here"	Johnston; Adlam	2:53
10.	"Can I Keep Talking to You"	Johnston; Wynne	4:05
11.	"Who Do You Wanna Be"	Johnston; Adlam	2:54
12.	"What I Know Now"	Johnston; Phil Barton; Dana Perdue; Kate Wilson	3:49
13.	"Blame"	Johnston; Joe Lasher; Dan Pellarin	2:42
14.	"No Girl"	Johnston; Sam Backoff; KK Johnson; Cole Miracle	2:16
15.	"Hell Boy"	Johnston; Josh Gallagher; Kyle Kelso	2:55
16.	"Bigger Picture"	Johnston; Barton; Pellarin	2:57
Total length:			48:19

== Personnel ==
Credits adapted from Tidal.

=== Musicians ===
- James Johnston – vocals (all tracks), electric guitar (track 2), acoustic guitar (4, 8, 15), harmonica (4, 13), backing vocals (4)
- Jared Adlam – acoustic guitar, bass guitar, electric guitar (1–12, 14–16); backing vocals (1–3, 5, 7, 16), piano (2, 4, 16), synthesizer (2, 6, 9, 14, 16), programming (2, 8, 9, 14, 15), banjo (5–7, 9, 11, 12, 14), organ (8), keyboards (15), mandolin (16)
- Reece Baines – drums (1–7, 9, 11, 12, 14–16)
- Tim Crouch – fiddle (1–4, 8); banjo, mandolin (1, 2, 4, 8); cello (2), acoustic guitar (8)
- Brooke Schubert – backing vocals (1–5, 7, 16)
- Jake Whittaker – backing vocals (1–3, 5, 7, 16)
- Lincoln Retallack – backing vocals (1–3, 5, 7, 16)
- Peter King – organ (1, 3, 5, 7, 11, 12), piano (3, 5, 10–12), synthesizer (9, 10)
- Travis Toy – Dobro (5, 10), pedal steel guitar (6, 10, 15), slide guitar (7), banjo (15)
- Brendan Ross – saxophone (8)
- Bez Roberts – trombone (8)
- Adam Howard – trumpet (8)
- Christoph Kotzé – vocals (8)
- Dan Pellarin – bass, Dobro, guitar, programming, synthesizer (13)

=== Technical ===
- Jared Adlam – production (1–12, 14–16), mixing (1–3, 5, 7–12, 14, 16)
- Dan Pellarin – production (13)
- Jim Cooley – mixing (4, 6)
- Dave Clauss – mixing (13, 15)
- Mike Cervantes – mastering (1–12, 14, 16)
- Adam Ayan – mastering (13, 15)
- Liam Quinn – vocal engineering (13)

== Charts ==
Weekly chart performance for Where You'll Find Me
Chart (2025)	Peak position
Australian Albums (ARIA)	5
Australian Country Albums (ARIA)	1
UK Album Downloads (Official Charts)	88

Year-end chart performance for Where You'll Find Me
Chart (2025)	Position
Australian Artist Albums (ARIA)	46
Australian Country Albums (ARIA)	50
