= Kaylee Bell =

New Zealand singer-songwriter

- Bell in 2018

Background information
- Born: 1989 or 1990 (age 36–37); Waimate, Canterbury, New Zealand
- Genre: Country
- Occupation: Singer-songwriter
- Years active: 2013–present
- Label: Independent
- Website: kayleebellmusic.com

Kaylee Bell is a New Zealand singer-songwriter. In 2013, she won the Toyota Star Maker award in Australia. Bell opened for Brad Paisley on his World Tour NZ show late 2022, Kane Brown on his Australia and NZ Arena Tour November 2024 and was support act for Ed Sheeran on his Mathematics World Stadium Tour in 2023. Bell shot to fame on The Voice Australia performing her hit single "Keith" to coach Keith Urban. The song reached #12 on the US Billboard chart and was a certified Gold record in Australia and New Zealand.

== Career ==
Bell was born in Waimate in Canterbury, New Zealand and began singing at the age of four. She attended Craighead Diocesan School in Timaru. Bell won the NZ Gold Guitar Award at age 18 and moved to Australia four years later to pursue a career in country music. In 2013, she won the prestigious Toyota Star Maker award, which led to her releasing the single "Pieces" with fellow Australasian, Jared Porter. The song received substantial airplay in Australia and earned the duo an APRA Award for Best Country Music Song at the 2015 APRA Silver Scroll Awards and the overall grand prize at the US Unsigned Only Competition, marking the first time a non-American had won the latter award. Bell independently released her debut studio album, Heart First, in 2013 that included her first solo single of the same name. Heart First won Best Country Album at the 2014 New Zealand Music Awards.

In 2016 Bell released her breakout single "Getting Closer" a break-up anthem written with Morgan Evans, that charted on the New Zealand Heatseekers singles chart. Bell started reaching career highs on the Australia country music charts with the release of her singles "One More Shot", "Who I Am", "Keith", and "Wasted on You" in 2018 and 2019; these songs and "Getting Closer" were later repackaged as The Red EP in 2021. Bell's tribute to Keith Urban, 'Keith' went to #1 on The Music Network Country Chart where it spent 25 weeks on the chart. Three further one-off singles were released in 2020: "Light On", "Home", and "Be With You". In 2021, Bell released three collaborative singles "That Summer" with Josh Mirenda or Lepnani, "Before I Met You" with The McClymonts, and "Living Free" with Lindsay Ell, and announced that her second studio album, Silver Linings, would be released November 26, 2021. 'That Summer' featuring Kiwi Pop Artist Lepani had crossover success at NZ mainstream radio in 2021 being 'the most added single to radio' for the month of May on hard hitters ZM, More Fm and The Hits.' Bell was chosen as the face for Spotify's EQUAL global programme for Female Artists in Music where she was featured on a billboard in Times Square, New York, USA.

In 2022, she auditioned for The Voice Australia and all four coaches turned for her. After Keith Urban was blocked, she chose to join Jessica Mauboy's team. She was eliminated in the battle rounds.

In June 2023, Bell became the first independent Australasian female country singer to receive a gold certified single or EP, with The Red EP.

Bell's third studio album Nights Like This was released in March 2024.

== Discography ==
=== Studio albums ===
Title	Album details	Peak chart positions
Title	Album details	NZ
Heartfirst	Release date: 5 July 2013; Label: Rural Press Events	—
Silver Linings	Release date: 26 November 2021; Label: Kaylee Bell (Independent)	—
Nights Like This	Release date: 15 March 2024; Label: Kaylee Bell (Independent)	3
Cowboy Up	Release date: 26 September 2025; Label: Kaylee Bell (Independent)	20

=== Extended plays ===
List of EPs, with selected details and peak chart positions
Title	EP details	Peak chart positions	Certifications
Title	EP details	AUS indie	Certifications
The Red EP	Release date: 26 February 2021; Label: Kaylee Bell (Independent)	9	ARIA: Gold

=== Singles ===
Title	Year	Peak chart positions	Album
Title	Year	NZ Hot	Album
"Heartfirst"	2013	—	Heartfirst
"Pieces" (with Jared Porter)	2014	—	East to West
"That's What I Call Crazy"	2016	—	Non-album single
"Getting Closer"	2016	— (Note: "Getting Closer" was released prior to the creation of the current Hot Singles Chart, but peaked at number 7 on the New Zealand Heatseekers Chart which ranked the top ten singles outside the main singles chart.)	The Red EP
"Next Somebody"	2017	— (Note: "Next Somebody" was released prior to the creation of the current Hot Singles Chart, but peaked at number 3 on the NZ Heatseekers Singles Chart which ranked the fastest-rising singles outside the main singles chart by New Zealand artists.)	Non-album single
"One More Shot"	2018	— (Note: "One More Shot" did not enter the Hot Singles Chart, but peaked at number 11 on the NZ Hot Singles Chart which tracks only songs by New Zealand artists.)	The Red EP
"Who I Am"	2018	—	The Red EP
"Keith"	2019	22	The Red EP
"Wasted on You"	2019	— (Note: "Wasted on You" did not enter the Hot Singles Chart, but peaked at number 12 on the NZ Hot Singles Chart which tracks only songs by New Zealand artists.)	The Red EP
"Light On"	2020	—	Non-album singles
"Home"	2020	—	Non-album singles
"Be With You"	2020	— (Note: "Be With You" did not enter the Hot Singles Chart, but peaked at number 13 on the NZ Hot Singles Chart which tracks only songs by New Zealand artists.)	Non-album singles
"That Summer" (featuring Josh Mirenda or Lepani)	2021	17	Silver Linings
"Before I Met You" (featuring The McClymonts)	2021	— (Note: "Before I Met You" did not enter the Hot Singles Chart, but peaked at number 20 on the NZ Hot Singles Chart which tracks only songs by New Zealand artists.)	Silver Linings
"Living Free" (featuring Lindsay Ell)	2021	— (Note: "Living Free" did not enter the Hot Singles Chart, but peaked at number 20 on the NZ Hot Singles Chart which tracks only songs by New Zealand artists.)	Silver Linings
"Same Songs" (with James Johnston)	2022	—	Raised Like That
"Small Town Friday Nights"	2022	—	Nights Like This
"Christmas Tree Farm"	2022	—	non album single
"Boots 'n All"	2023	20	Nights Like This
"When Summer Rolls Around"	2023	13	Nights Like This
"Nights Like This"	2023	37	Nights Like This
"Good Things"	2023	21	Nights Like This
"Life Is Tough (But So Am I)" (with Navvy)	2024	41	Nights Like This
"Where Were You"	2024	—	Nights Like This
"Cowboy Up"	2024	—	Cowboy Up
"Say the Dance, Boots 'n' All" (with The Wiggles)	2025	—	Wiggle Up, Giddy Up!
"Ring on It"	2025	29	Cowboy Up
"Red Dirt Romeo"	2025	30	Cowboy Up
"Matariki Hunga Nui (Calling Me Home)" (with Troy Kingi and Rob Ruha)	2025	21	Non-album single
"Song for Shania"	2025	30	Cowboy Up
"Wake Me Up When It's Christmas Time"	2025	40	Non-album singles
"Me for Me"	2026	21	Non-album singles
"—" denotes recording that failed to chart or was not eligible to chart.

== Awards and nominations ==
=== APRA Awards ===
The APRA Awards are held in Australia and New Zealand by the Australasian Performing Right Association to recognise songwriting skills, sales and airplay performance by its members annually.

Year	Nominee / work	Award	Result	Ref.
2024	"Same Songs" (with James Johnson)	Most Performed Country Work of the Year	Nominated	
2025	"Good Things"	Most Performed Country Work of the Year	Nominated	

=== Country Music Awards of Australia ===
The Country Music Awards of Australia is an annual awards night held in January during the Tamworth Country Music Festival. Celebrating recording excellence in the Australian country music industry. They commenced in 1973.

Year	Nominee / work	Award	Result	Ref.
2022	(unknown)	(unknown)	Nominated	
2023	"Small Town" (with James Johnston)	Vocal Collaboration of the Year	Won	
2023	Silver Linings	Contemporary Country Album of the Year	Nominated	
2023	Silver Linings	Album of the Year	Nominated	
2024	"Boots 'n' All" (directed by Shae Sterling)	Video of the Year	Nominated	
2024	Kaylee Bell	Female Artist of the Year	Won	
2025	Kaylee Bell	Female Artist of the Year	Nominated	
2025	"Beer in a Bar" (with The Wolfe Brothers)	Vocal Collaboration of the Year	Won	
2026	Kaylee Bell	Female Artist of the Year	Nominated	
2026	Cowboy Up	Contemporary Country Album of the Year	Nominated	
2026	Cowboy Up	Album of the Year	Nominated	
2026	"Cowboy Up" (Kaylee Bell, Brooke Singer, Jol Mulholland)	Song of the Year	Nominated	

=== Country Music Association Awards ===
The Country Music Association Awards (CMA) are an annual American awards show honouring the best in country music. Bell has received two nominations.

Year	Nominee / work	Award	Result
2022	Kaylee Bell	Global Country Artist Award	Nominated
2023	Kaylee Bell	Global Country Artist Award	Won

=== Tamworth Songwriters Awards ===
The Tamworth Songwriters Association (TSA) is an annual songwriting contest for original country songs, awarded in January at the Tamworth Country Music Festival. They commenced in 1986. Kaylee Bell has won one award.

Year	Nominee / work	Award	Result
2010	"The Seed" by Kaylee Bell and Lance Coassin	Amateur Contemporary Award	Won
