= Keith (Kaylee Bell song) =

Single by Kaylee Bell

from the EP The Red EP
- Released: 15 February 2019
- Recorded: 2018
- Genre: Country
- Length: 2:51
- Label: Independent
- Songwriters: Phil Barton; Kaylee Bell; Lindsay Rimes
- Producer: Lindsay Rimes

Kaylee Bell singles chronology
| "Who I Am" (2018) | "Keith" (2019) | "Wasted on You" (2019) |

Music video
- "Keith" on YouTube

"Keith" is a song by New Zealand singer-songwriter Kaylee Bell from her first extended play, The Red EP (2021). Written by Bell with Phil Barton and Lindsay Rimes and produced by the latter, Bell recorded the song in 2018 in Nashville, Tennessee. It was independently released on 15 February 2019. A country song, it makes reference to several songs by Australian singer Keith Urban, which led music critics to consider it as a tribute song to him.

"Keith" peaked at number 22 on the New Zealand Hot Singles Chart. In April 2022, Bell sang it on The Voice Australia which made all coaches turn, including Urban himself. Bell was applauded by all coaches for her performance. She also performed the song in 2019 at Jesse Mulligan and Mike Hosking's radio shows. It was further promoted by an accompanying live video and a music video. In the second visual, a woman is shown alongside her partner while Bell is seen singing.

== Background and release ==
"Keith" was written by Bell with Phil Barton and Lindsay Rimes, with Rimes producing it. Bell recorded the song in 2018 in Nashville, Tennessee, when she brought the idea to Barton and Rimes while staying there. In a July 2019 interview with CMT, Bell revealed that she came up with the idea to use song titles from Keith Urban to "tell the story of falling in love for the first time and how music and songs take you back". She had already met Urban in 2013, and performed on his Light the Fuse Tour in Australia in 2014 and on his Ripcord World Tour in New Zealand in 2016. "Keith" was independently released as a single on 15 February 2019 in various countries for digital download and streaming. A pop remix of the song was also issued in March 2022 for the same formats. On 22 August 2022, it was serviced to American country radio stations.

== Composition ==
Musically, "Keith" is a country song which references 12 of Urban's tracks, such as "Somewhere in My Car", "Long Hot Summer" and "Raise 'Em Up". Bell told TimeOut she came up with the song's concept in the middle of the night and was on her phone for a year before she decided to make it into the song. According to The New Zealand Herald, it is a love song "based around some the biggest songs released by Urban". The New Zealand Herald and Triple M deemed the track "an ode to [Urban]", while Peter Tuskan of The Music Network and Stuff's Joanne Holden opined that Bell pays tribute to Urban due to the references to his song titles. The New Zealand Music Commission called it "an ode to the significance of music as it ties into our past". Triple M also asserted that Bell using Urban's song titles "inspire[s] a simple relatable story of young love".

== Reception and promotion ==
Tuskan called "Keith" a "clever country banger" and a "jam enviable of the country legend himself". The staff of Triple M stated that Bell "issue[d] the ultimate tribute" with the song. For the week dated 16 May 2022, "Keith" re-entered the New Zealand Hot Singles chart and peaked at number 22. On 20 April 2022, Bell performed the song on The Voice Australia, being accompanied by a guitar. All four coaches turned their chairs, with Urban being the first to do so. Bell was applauded by all coaches for her performance. Urban affirmed that he already knew the song, calling it "touching" and saying that he "couldn't believe how catchy it was". Fellow coach Rita Ora further labeled it a "smash" and commended Bell for "[taking] a huge risk" by choosing to perform the song.

Upon its release, the song was accompanied by a live performance video, which contains footage of Bell performing at music festival Top Paddock. An official music video for the single was issued on Bell's YouTube channel on 27 June 2019. It depicts a woman spending her time with her partner. Bell is shown in interspersed shots either singing at a bar or in front of a screen. According to CMT, Bell "looks back fondly on her time with a former love" in the visual. On 25 February 2019, she performed "Keith" on Jesse Mulligan's radio program Afternoons with Jesse Mulligan. Bell gave a rendition of the song during Mike Hosking's show at Newstalk ZB in March 2019.

== Track listing ==
- Digital download
1. "Keith" – 2:51
- Digital download (Pop Remix)
1. "Keith (Pop Remix)" – 2:52

== Charts ==
Chart performance for "Keith"
| Chart (2022) | Peak position |
|---|---|
| New Zealand Hot Singles (Recorded Music NZ) | 22 |

== Release history ==
Release dates and formats for "Keith"
| Region | Date | Format(s) | Version | Label | Ref. |
|---|---|---|---|---|---|
| Various | 15 February 2019 | Digital download; streaming | Original | Kaylee Bell | |
| United States | 22 August 2022 | Country radio | Original | N/A | |
| Various | 31 March 2022 | Digital download; streaming | Pop remix | Kaylee Bell | |
