= Zac & George =

Australian country music duo

- Origin: Newcastle, New South Wales, Australia
- Genre: Country
- Years active: 2017–present
- Label: Ditto Music
- Members: George Goodfellow; Zac Roddy
- Website: www.zacandgeorge.com

Zac & George is an Australian country music duo composed of George Goodfellow and Zac Roddy. They have been friends since high school.

They won their first golden guitar at the 2025 Country Music Awards of Australia for Vocal Group or Duo of the Year.

Zac & George released their debut album Call It a Day on 2 October 2026.

== Career ==
In January 2017, Zac & George busked at the Country Music Festival.

In 2018 Zac & George took out second place in the Toyota Landcruiser Country Music Busking Championships. The same year, they won the People's Choice award at the Emerging Talent contest at the Gympie Muster. In 2020, they featured at the Tamworth Country Music Festival.

In February 2022, Zac & George released their debut single "Jump Right In".

In July 2023, Zac & George's collaboration with James Johnston "Some Things Never Change" was released.

In June 2024, they performed at the CMA Fest in Nashville, United States. This was followed in August 2024, where they performed at the Tara Festival of Culture and Camel Race

In 2026, they performed at the Deniliquin Ute Muster .

Zac & George released their debut album Call It a Day on 2 October 2026.

== Discography ==
=== Albums ===
List of studio albums, with selected chart positions
Title	Album details	Peak chart positions
Title	Album details	AUS
Call It a Day	Released: 2 October 2026; Label: DIT; Formats: CD, LP, digital download	58

== Awards and nominations ==
=== APRA Awards ===
The APRA Awards are presented annually from 1982 by the Australasian Performing Right Association (APRA), "honouring composers and songwriters". They commenced in 1982.

Year	Nominee / work	Award	Result	Ref.
2025	"Some Things Never Change" (with James Johnston) (James Johnston, George Goodfellow, Zac Roddy and Nicole Spooner)	Most Performed Country Work of the Year	Nominated	
2025	"Call It a Day" (George Goodfellow, Zac Roddy, Nicole Miller and Kyle Winski)	Most Performed Country Work of the Year	Nominated	

=== Country Music Awards of Australia ===
The Country Music Awards of Australia (CMAA) (also known as the Golden Guitar Awards) is an annual awards night held in January during the Tamworth Country Music Festival, celebrating recording excellence in the Australian country music industry. They have been held annually since 1973.

Year	Nominee / work	Award	Result	Ref.
2024	"Some Things Never Change" (with James Johnston)	Vocal Collaboration of the Year	Nominated	
2024	Zac & George	New Talent of the Year	Nominated	
2024	Zac & George	Vocal Group or Duo of the Year	Nominated	
2025	Zac & George	New Talent of the Year	Nominated	
2025	Zac & George	Vocal Group or Duo of the Year	Won	
2026	"How Many One More Times?" (with the Wolfe Brothers)	Vocal Collaboration of the Year	Won	
2026	"How Many One More Times?" (with the Wolfe Brothers)	Single of the Year	Nominated	
2027	Zac & George	Vocal Group or Duo of the Year	Pending	
