= Shaun Wessell =

Australian rugby league footballer

Personal information
- Full name: Shaun Wessell
- Born: 17 May 1981 (age 44) Sydney, New South Wales, Australia

Playing information
- Position: Prop
Club
Years	Team	Pld	T	G	FG	P
2003	Cronulla Sharks	3	0	0	0	0

Shaun Wessell (/vɛsəl/) (born 17 May 1981) is an Australian former rugby league footballer who played in the 2000s. He played for the Cronulla-Sutherland Sharks. His position of choice was prop.

== Playing career ==
Wessell was a Dapto junior. He made his first grade debut from the bench in his side's 36−32 loss the Melbourne Storm at Toyota Park in round 1 of the 2003 season. He played only two more games of first grade, the last of which was in his side's 25−16 victory over the St. George Illawarra Dragons at Toyota Park in round 23 of the 2003 season. Wessell was released by the Sharks at the end of the 2003 season, and subsequently never played first grade rugby league again.

After his departure from the Sharks, Wessell went on to play for the Dapto Canaries in the Illawarra Rugby League competition.

Wessell appeared on The Voice (Australian season 11) in 2022. He was eliminated on 8 May.
