= Lachie Gill =

Australian singer-songwriter

- Born: 20 January 1998 (age 28)
- Instruments: Vocals, Guitar
- Years active: 2022–present
- Label: Universal Music Australia
- Website: www.lachiegillmusic.com.au

Lachie Gill (born 20 January 1998) is an Australian singer-songwriter. He won the eleventh season of The Voice Australia on 29 May 2022. He received $100,000 and a record label deal with Universal Music Australia.

== Career ==
=== 2022: The Voice Australia ===
In 2022, Gill auditioned for The Voice Australia. He performed "If the World Was Ending" in the blind auditions and got the four coaches, Keith Urban, Jess Mauboy, Rita Ora, and Guy Sebastian to turn for him. After Sebastian was blocked by Ora, he chose to be a part of Team Rita, where he won the show on 29 May 2022.

denotes winner.

The Voice performances and results (2022)
Episode	Song	Original Artist	Result
Audition	"If the World Was Ending"	JP Saxe (featuring Julia Michaels)	Through to The Callbacks
The Callbacks	"Bruises" (vs Robbie Dolan and Dominic Clarke)	Lewis Capaldi	Through to Battles
Battles	"It'll Be Okay"	Shawn Mendes	Through to the Sing-Offs
Sing-Offs	"I Guess I'm in Love"	Clinton Kane	Saved by Coach. Through to Semi Final
Semi Final	"Deja Vu"	Olivia Rodrigo	Saved by Coach. Through to Grand Final
Grand Final	"Time After Time"	Cyndi Lauper	Winner
Grand Final	"Always Remember Us This Way" (with Rita Ora)	Lady Gaga	Winner

On 11 November 2022, Gill released "Sad Summer". About the release, Gill said "It was at a time when my relationship was going through a bit of a rough stage. I've written way too many sad songs, and I wanted to see if I could put that energy into something a bit more upbeat." Gill's debut EP Write It Out was released on 17 November 2023. The singles "Give Me a Little", "Sweet Something", and "Last Christmas" were released in 2025 independent from an album, while "Last Drive" was released in 2026.

== Personal life ==
Gill resides in Melbourne, Victoria and works as a physical education teacher. He was formerly an AFL player.

== Discography ==
=== Extended plays ===
List of EPs, with selected details
Title	Details
Write It Out	Scheduled: 17 November 2023; Label: Universal Music Australia; Format: digital
We Never Said Our Goodbyes	Scheduled: 2 October 2026; Label: Universal Music Australia; Format: digital

=== Singles ===
List of singles
Title	Year	Album
"Wasted Time"	2022	non album single
"Sad Summer"	2022	Write It Out
"Right People, Wrong Time" (featuring Elaskia)	2023	Write It Out
"Hate That You Hurt"	2023	Write It Out
"Happy It's Ending"	2023	Write It Out
"Write It Out"	2024	Write It Out
"Give Me a Little"	2025	We Never Said Our Goodbyes
"Sweet Something"	2025	We Never Said Our Goodbyes
"Last Christmas"	2025	
"Last Drive"	2026	We Never Said Our Goodbyes
"Your Side" (with Elaksia)	2026	We Never Said Our Goodbyes
"Are You OK?"	2026	We Never Said Our Goodbyes

Preceded by Bella Taylor Smith	The Voice winner 2022	Succeeded by Tarryn Stokes
