= Jaedyn Randell =

New Zealand Māori singer

- Born: New Zealand
- Education: Massey University
- Occupation: Singer
- Years active: 2017–present

Jaedyn Randell is a New Zealand Māori singer who voiced the character Moana in the te reo Māori version of the Disney film Moana and has performed her own music on platforms including Waiata Nation and The Voice Australia.

== Early life ==
Randell is from New Zealand and her cultural heritage is grounded in her ties to Tainui iwi, with affiliations to Ngāti Paoa and Ngāti Makirangi hapū. She was raised in Māori culture and the traditions of kapa haka, an integral part of her upbringing that connected her to te ao Māori (the Māori world). Randell did not grow up as a fluent Māori speaker. She attended kōhanga reo, a Māori language immersion preschool, participated in bilingual classes, and took Māori language classes in high school.

Randell majored in music technology with a focus on music production and sound engineering at the Massey University College of Creative Arts Toi Rauwhārangi. She received a scholarship from the university for Māori students.

== Career ==
In 2011, she appeared on the What Now show, The One, which she won at the age of 10.

In 2017, at the age of 16, Randell was cast as the voice of Disney’s Moana in the te reo Māori version of the animated film. The production by Matewa Media was directed by Rachel House, with producer Tweedie Waititi and musical direction by Rob Ruha. Randell and the team had three months to prepare for the film’s release during Māori Language Week, an event that aligned with the project’s goals to promote the revitalization of te reo Māori.

In 2021, Randell, then 20 years old, participated in the second season of Waiata Nation, a Māori television series on Whakaata Māori showcasing Māori musicians performing in te reo Māori. Her debut single "Patupaiārehe," entirely in te reo Māori, was inspired by her personal experiences with identity as a fair-skinned Māori woman. The song was her way of addressing her struggles with cultural identity and her pride in her heritage.

In 2024, Randell competed in The Voice Australia season 13. In the blind auditions, she performed Jessie J's "Big White Room" and captured the interest of coaches Guy Sebastian, Kate Miller-Heidke, and Adam Lambert. Miller-Heidke used the "Ultimate Block" for Randell, which defaulted Randell to her team. She made it to the finals and sang two songs, including "Walking On A Dream" by Empire of the Sun as a duet with coach Miller-Heidke. For her solo performance, she sang "Snow Angel" by Reneé Rapp. She finished as a runner-up.

In 2025, she was awarded the Pacific Entertainment Top Female Artist Award from the Variety Artists Club of New Zealand.
