= Brenda Bressed =

Australian drag performer

- Born: Bryce Gibson
- Occupation: Drag queen
- Television: The Voice (season 12); Drag Race Down Under (season 4)

Brenda Bressed is the stage name of Bryce Gibson, an Australian drag performer who was a finalist on the twelfth season of The Voice and competed on the fourth season of Drag Race Down Under.

== Career ==
Brenda Bressed was a finalist on the twelfth season of The Voice and competed on the fourth season of Drag Race Down Under. She won the Snatch Game challenge. After Drag Race aired, she was part of the Drag Race Down Under Season Four Live Tour.

== Personal life ==
Brenda Bressed is from Melbourne and has cited Dolly Parton as an inspiration.

== Filmography ==
- The Voice (season 12)
- Drag Race Down Under (season 4)

== See also ==
- List of people from Melbourne
