= Duncan Toombs =

Australian country singer-songwriter

- Born: Duncan Toombs; 14 June 1977 (age 49)
- Occupations: Singer-songwriter, film director
- Instrument: Vocals
- Years active: 2022–present
- Label: Compass Brothers
- Website: duncantoombs.com

Duncan Toombs is an Australian singer-songwriter, musician and video director. He has won seven Golden Guitar Awards for Music Video of the Year. Toombs released his debut studio album, Steel on Steel in January 2023.

== Career ==
In June 2022, Toombs released his debut single "Run"; recorded during a two-day stay at Rod McCormack's, The Music Cellar on the NSW Central Coast. Steel on Steel was released on 13 January 2023.

In 2024, Toombs auditioned for the thirteenth season of The Voice Australia. After getting the show's four coaches, Guy Sebastian, LeAnn Rimes, Kate Miller-Heidke, and Adam Lambert, to turn their chairs for him, he chose to be a part of Team LeAnn. Toombs lost his battle round, but was "saved" by Rimes. He continued to the knockouts where he was eliminated.

At the 2027 Country Music Awards, Toombs was nominated for Male artist the Year and Music Video of the Year for "Out of Here".

== Discography ==
=== Studio albums ===
List of studio albums, with selected details and chart positions
Title	Album details	Peak chart positions
Title	Album details	AUS
Steel on Steel	Released: 13 January 2023; Label: Compass Brothers (106CBCD); Formats: Digital, CD	30

== Awards and nominations ==
=== ARIA Music Awards ===
The ARIA Music Awards is an annual awards ceremony that recognises excellence, innovation, and achievement across all genres of Australian music.

Year	Nominee / work	Award	Result	Ref.
2015	"Spirit of the Anzacs" by Lee Kernaghan (directed by Duncan Toombs)	Best Video	Nominated	

=== Country Music Awards of Australia ===
The Country Music Awards of Australia is an annual awards night held in January during the Tamworth Country Music Festival. Celebrating recording excellence in the Australian country music industry. They commenced in 1973.

Year	Nominee / work	Award	Result (wins only)	Ref.
2010	"When I Was a Boy" by Greg Storer & Sara Storer (directed by Duncan Toombs)	Video Clip of the Year	Won	
2011	"Calling Me Home" by Sara Storer (directed by Duncan Toombs)	Video Clip of the Year	Won	
2012	"Children of the Gurindji" by Sara Storer & Kev Carmody (directed by Duncan Toombs)	Video Clip of the Year	Won	
2013	"Piece of Me" by The McClymonts (directed by Duncan Toombs)	Video Clip of the Year	Won	
2014	"Flying with the King" by Lee Kernaghan (directed by Duncan Toombs)	Video Clip of the Year	Won	
2015	"Canoe" by Sara Storer (directed by Duncan Toombs)	Video Clip of the Year	Won	
2016	"Spirit of the Anzacs" by Lee Kernaghan & Special Guests (directed by Duncan Toombs)	Video Clip of the Year	Won	
2024	"Steel on Steel" by Duncan Toombs (directed by Duncan Toombs and The Filmery)	Video Clip of the Year	Won	
2024	"1861"	Heritage Song of the Year	Won	
