= Tarryn Stokes =

Australian singer

- Born: 5 January 1983 (age 43)
- Instrument: Vocals
- Years active: 2018–present
- Label: Universal Music Australia
- Website: tarrynstokes.com

Tarryn Stokes (born 5 January 1983) is an Australian singer-songwriter. She won the twelfth season of The Voice Australia on 8 October 2023. She received $100,000 and a record label deal with Universal Music Australia. At the age of 40, she became the show's oldest winner since its inception in 2012.

== Career ==
=== 2018: All Together Now ===
In 2018, Stokes competed on the Australian version of All Together Now, eventually runner-up behind the winner, Lai Utovou. She also was the only contestant to score a 100 in the final round.

In November 2019, Stokes released "Thunder".

In October 2022, Stokes featured on lead vocals on the Blue Sky Walking single "Heart of Australia"

=== 2023: The Voice Australia ===
In 2023, Stokes auditioned for The Voice Australia. She performed "She Used to Be Mine" by Sara Bareilles in the blind auditions and got the four coaches; Guy Sebastian, Jess Mauboy, Jason Derulo, and Rita Ora; to turn for her. She chose to be a part of Team Rita, where she won the show on 8 October 2023.

denotes winner.

The Voice performances and results (2023)
Episode	Song	Original Artist	Result
Audition	"She Used to Be Mine"	Sara Bareilles	Through to The Callbacks
The Callbacks	"The Winner Takes It All" (vs Emily Kate and Gabby Asta)	ABBA	Through to Battles
Battles	"Alone"	Heart	Through to the Sing-Offs
Sing-Offs	"Anyone"	Demi Lovato	Saved by Coach. Through to Semi Final
Semi Final	"The Scientist"	Coldplay	Saved by Coach. Through to Grand Final
Grand Final	"All by Myself"	Eric Carmen	Winner
Grand Final	"The Best" (with Rita Ora)	Tina Turner	Winner

Immediately after the being declared the winner, a 5-track EP titled The Complete Collection was released, including Stokes' winner single "Nobody" to which Stokes said "Nobody is more than just a breakup song, to me it is about breaking up with the things or people in your life that are no longer good for you. Listening to your inner voice and being confident when speaking out, singing out. I hope it resonates and encourages everyone who listens."

== Personal life ==
Stokes resides in Whittlesea, Victoria where she works as a vocal teacher. She is married to her husband Paul and has two children.

== Discography ==
=== Extended plays ===
List of extended plays, with selected details
Title	Details
The Complete Collection	Released: 8 October 2023; Label: Universal Music Australia; Formats: Digital download

=== Singles ===
List of singles, with selected details
Title	Year	Album
"Thunder"	2019	Non-album singles
"Hero" (Joe Romeo featuring Tarryn Stokes)	2022	Non-album singles
"Our King Will Come" (Joe Romeo featuring Tarryn Stokes)	2022	Non-album singles
"Heart of Australia" (Performed by Tarryn Stokes)	2022	Non-album singles
"Nobody"	2023	The Complete Collection

Preceded by Lachie Gill	The Voice winner 2023	Succeeded by Reuben De Melo
