= Matewa Media =

- Founded: 2017; 9 years ago
- Founders: Tweedie Waititi; Chelsea Winstanley
- Website: https://www.matewamedia.nz/

Matewa Media is a New Zealand production company that dubs Disney animated films into the Māori language.

== Productions ==
=== Moana Reo Māori (2017) ===
Matewa Media was formed by Tweedie Waititi and Chelsea Winstanley in 2017 after seeing how popular the 2016 film Moana was with Winstanley's children. With the help of Waititi's cousin and Winstanley's husband Taika Waititi, who wrote the initial screenplay of Moana and was at the time working on Thor: Ragnarok, they secured the dubbing rights from Disney. They received funding from Disney, Air New Zealand, and Te Māngai Pāho who gave $160,000. It was announced in June 2017, with high school student Jaedyn Randell and Te Kāea newsreader Piripi Taylor cast as the lead roles of Moana and Maui respectively, while Rachel House, Temuera Morrison, and Jemaine Clement reprised their roles from the English version. A total of 250 people auditioned for the role of Moana. House also served as the performance director, while Rob Ruha was the musical director.

The film premiered on 11 September 2017, during Te Wiki o te Reo Māori. It was screened for free in thirty cinemas around the country, with no English subtitles. The soundtrack was released in November 2017, and the film launched on the Disney+ streaming service on 26 June 2020.

=== The Lion King Reo Māori and Frozen Reo Māori (2022) ===
Māori dubs of the 1994 film The Lion King and the 2013 film Frozen were announced in July 2021, with Matewa Media getting $500,000 in funding from NZ On Air to produce them in December 2021.

The cast of The Lion King Reo Māori was announced in May 2022, with Mataara Stokes as Simba, Arihia Cassidy as Nala, Piripi Taylor as Mufasa, Matu Ngaropo as Scar, and Matai Rae and Justin Rogers as Timon and Pumbaa respectively. Each group of animals speak their own Māori dialect from five different iwi; the lions are Waikato Tainui, the hyenas are Ngāti Kahungunu, Timon and Pumbaa are Te Tai Tokerau Māori, Zazu is Taranaki, and Rafiki is Ngāi Tūhoe. Matewa Media appealed directly to Elton John for permission to dub his version of "Can You Feel the Love Tonight" in the closing credits, becoming the first foreign version of the film to do so. Stan Walker performed the cover. The film released on 21 June 2022, with the premiere attended by the Māori King Tūheitia Paki.

The cast of Frozen Reo Māori was announced in September 2022, with Jaedyn Randell as Anna, Awhimai Fraser as Elsa, Kawiti Waetford as Kristoff, James Tito as Hans, and Pere Wihongi as Olaf. Due to the colder climate, the film is in the dialect of Ngāi Tahu. The film premiered on 26 October 2022.

Both films launched on Disney+ in November 2022.

=== Coco Reo Māori (2023) ===
At the premiere of Frozen Reo Māori, Waititi announced that the 2021 film Encanto and the 2017 film Coco were next. Matewa Media secured another $500,000 in funding from NZ On Air to produce them in December 2022, and the release of Coco Reo Māori was set for Matariki 2023. The cast was announced on 9 June 2023, with Mānuera Mānihera as Miguel, Troy Kingi as Héctor, Justin Rogers as Ernesto de la Cruz, Naomi Herewini-Houia as Mamá Imelda, Kuini Moehau-Reedy as Abuelita, and Rachel House as Mamá Coco. The characters speak in the Ngāti Porou dialect due to the iwi having many descendants of Spanish trader Manuel José. Previous dubs had gone through post-production in America, but for Coco Reo Māori this was done at Park Road Post in Wellington.

=== Encanto Reo Māori (2024) ===
The Māori dub of Encanto was formally announced in May 2023. The cast was announced on 5 August 2024, with Te Waimarie Ngatai-Callaghan as Mirabel, Hinetu Dell as Abuela, Poroaki Merrit-McDonald as Bruno, Anahera Taare as Isabela, Marcia Hopa as Luisa's speaking voice, and Awatea Wihongi as Luisa's singing voice. The film will release on 12 September.

=== Moana 2 Reo Māori (2024) ===
On 28 November 2024, the Māori dub of Moana 2 released in New Zealand concurrently with the English language version. The cast of the first film returned, with new characters being voiced by Arihia Cassidy, Rutene Spooner and Nepia Takuira-Mita.
