= Chelsea Winstanley =

New Zealand film producer (born 1976)

Chelsea Winstanley ONZM
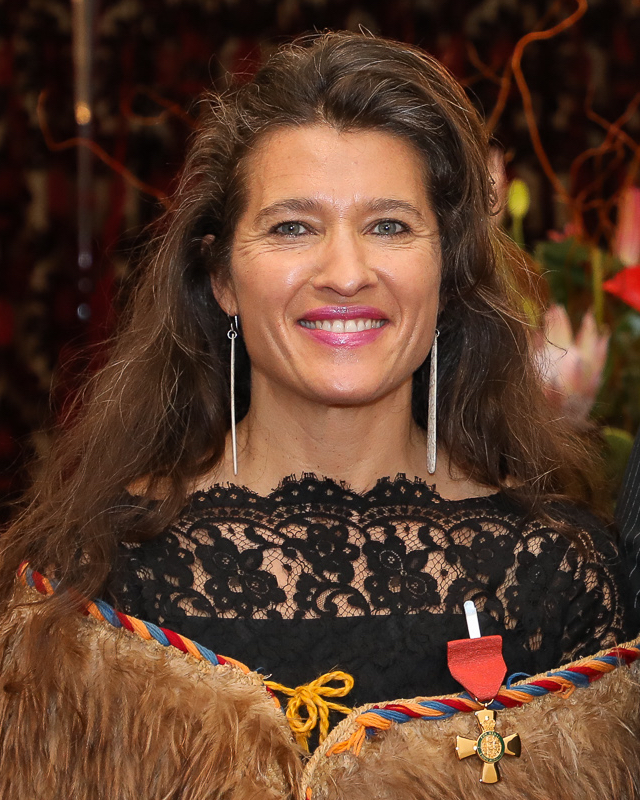
- Winstanley in 2022
- Born: Chelsea Jane Winstanley; Tauranga, Bay of Plenty, New Zealand
- Occupation: Film producer
- Spouse: Taika Waititi (m. 2011; div. 2018)
- Children: 3

Chelsea Jane Winstanley ONZM CRSNZ is a New Zealand film producer. She produces short films and documentaries which celebrate Indigenous peoples. She also produced the films What We Do in the Shadows and Jojo Rabbit.

== Early life and education ==
Chelsea Jane Winstanley was born in Tauranga, Bay of Plenty, New Zealand. She is the daughter of John Winstanley, a home renovator, and Cherry Wilson, a psychotherapist. Winstanley's maternal grandmother was Kiritapu "Kitty" Wilson (née Borell) (1926–2014). Winstanley has Ngāti Ranginui and Ngāi Te Rangi ancestry through her mother.

== Career ==
Winstanley has produced short films such as Meathead, Ebony Society, and Night Shift. In 2014, she co-produced What We Do in the Shadows with Taika Waititi and Jemaine Clement. She also co-produced Te Whakarauora Tangata and a documentary about Merata Mita.

Winstanley wrote and directed the 10-minute segment Kiritapu for the 2017 anthology film Waru, which comprises eight stories centred around child abuse in New Zealand.

In 2017, Winstanley created the film production company Matewa Media alongside Tweedie Waititi, which focuses on creating Māori language adaptations of Disney animated films. As of 2020, the company has created adaptations of Moana (released in 2017), The Lion King and Frozen (both released in 2022). She directed the documentary Toi Tū Toi Ora in 2020.

== Awards and recognition ==
She won the 2014 SPADA Screen Industry Awards Independent Producer of the Year (shared with Taika Waititi). In 2015, Winstanley was the New Zealand Women in Film and Television's Mana Wahine recipient at Wairoa's Maori Film Festival.

In the 2022 Queen's Birthday and Platinum Jubilee Honours, Winstanley was appointed an Officer of the New Zealand Order of Merit, for services to the screen industry and Māori.

Winstanley has won two awards at the Women in Film and Television New Zealand Awards: in 2009 she won the Woman to Watch Award, and in 2022 she won the Award for Achievement in Film.

In 2026, Winstanley was elected a Companion of the Royal Society Te Apārangi, for "sustained and outstanding leadership in film-making and cinematography for Māori and for New Zealand".

== Personal life ==
At age 20, Winstanley had a son whom she raised as a single mother.

In 2011, she married New Zealand director Taika Waititi; they have two daughters. The couple separated in 2018.
