= Reuben De Melo =

Australian singer-songwriter

- Born: Goa, India
- Instruments: Vocals, Guitar
- Years active: 2018–present
- Website: reubendemelo.com

Reuben De Melo is an Australian indie folk singer-songwriter. He won the thirteenth season of The Voice Australia on 27 October 2024, where he was coached by LeAnn Rimes.

== Early life ==
Reuben De Melo was born to Augustine and Maria Aurit De Melo in Goa, India. His family hails from Maina Curtorim, Goa. He has a sister Reuel.

== Career ==
=== 2018–2024: Consumed and other releases ===
De Melo began his career by releasing his debut EP, Consumed in 2018. Up until 2024, prior to his time on The Voice Australia, he released numerous other singles. His 2020 single, "Sweet Oblivion", has received over 4.5 million streams on Spotify.

=== 2024: The Voice Australia ===
In 2024, De Melo auditioned for The Voice Australia. He performed "I See Fire" in the blind auditions and got the four coaches, Guy Sebastian, LeAnn Rimes, Kate Miller-Heidke, and Adam Lambert to turn for him. After all three other coaches were blocked by Rimes using the new Ultimate Block, De Melo was defaulted to Rimes's team. After his audition, Lambert stated that De Melo a "diamond in the rough" and Miller-Heidke expressed that he "could win [the] competition." De Melo won the season on 27 October 2024 after receiving the most votes from a viewer poll.

denotes winner.

The Voice performances and results (2024)
| Episode | Song | Original Artist | Result |
|---|---|---|---|
| Audition | "I See Fire" | Ed Sheeran | Through to The Battles |
| The Battles | "Hallelujah" (vs Larissa Kovalchuk) | Leonard Cohen | Through to Knockouts |
| Knockouts | "Use Somebody" | Kings of Leon | Through to The Showdowns |
| The Showdowns | "Don't You Worry Child" | Swedish House Mafia | Through to the Semi-final |
| Semi-final | "Wicked Game" | Chris Isaak | Saved by Coach. Through to Grand Final |
| Grand Final | "The House of the Rising Sun" | Animals | Winner |
| Grand Final | "Fix You" (with LeAnn Rimes) | Coldplay | Winner |

=== 2025–present: When The Show's All Over and tour ===
In May 2025, De Melo released the lead single, "Slow", from his second EP, When The Show's All Over. The EP features six singles and was released on 12 September 2025. De Melo was invited by his coach LeAnn Rimes to perform alongside her during her Australian tour in the latter half of 2025.

== Personal life ==
De Melo is of Goan descent. He lives in Perth with his wife, Olivia, and has three children. Prior to his win on The Voice, he worked as a rigger in the mining industry.

== Discography ==
=== Extended plays ===
List of EPs, with selected details
| Title | Details |
|---|---|
| Consumed | Released: November 2018; Label: Reuben De Melo (independent); Format: Digital |
| When The Show's All Over | Released: 12 September 2025; Label: Reuben De Melo (independent); Format: Digital |

| Preceded by Tarryn Stokes | The Voice winner 2024 | Succeeded by Alyssa Delpopolo |
