= The Voice (Australian TV series) season 12 =

The Voice
- Season 12
- Poster featuring coaches (clockwise from top left) Sebastian, Ora, Mauboy, and Derulo in their respective chairs
- Hosted by: Sonia Kruger
- Coaches: Guy Sebastian; Jessica Mauboy; Jason Derulo; Rita Ora
- Winner: Tarryn Stokes
- Winning coach: Rita Ora
- Runners-up: Ezra Williams, Charlie Pittman, and Ethan Beckton

Release
- Original network: Seven Network
- Original release: 6 August – 8 October 2023

Season chronology
- ← Previous; Season 11 Next → Season 13

The twelfth season of The Voice began airing on 6 August 2023. In March 2023, it was announced Seven Network had once again picked up the series for its twelfth season, set to broadcast in 2023. At the same time, it was announced that Jessica Mauboy, Rita Ora, and Guy Sebastian would all return as coaches. Jason Derulo debuted as a coach, replacing Keith Urban, who left the show for personal reasons. Sonia Kruger also returned as host.

With Keith Urban's departure as a coach, the twelfth season is the first to not feature any of the original coaches from the show's inaugural season.

Similar to the previous two seasons, the finale was pre-recorded and the winner was determined by a viewer poll. Tarryn Stokes was declared the winner, marking Rita Ora's third and final win as a coach (her first win occurred on the generations version of the show). Also, with Stokes' win, Ora became the third coach (after Seal and Delta Goodrem) to win two consecutive seasons in the Australian franchise of The Voice. Moreover, with Ora's win, she tied with Delta Goodrem for having the most wins as coaches on The Voice Australia.

== Coaches and Host ==
Coaches and Host of The Voice Season 12

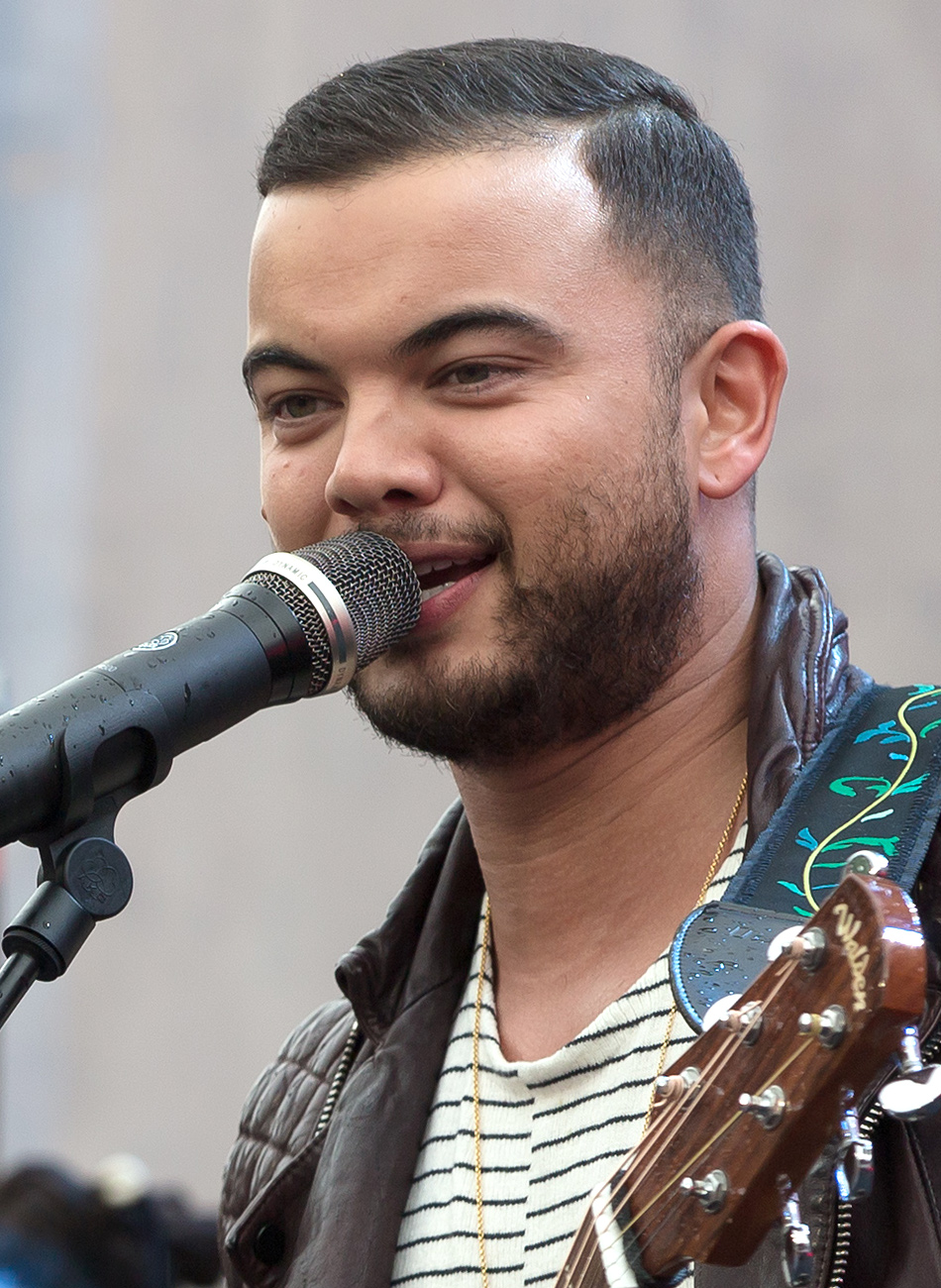
Guy Sebastian

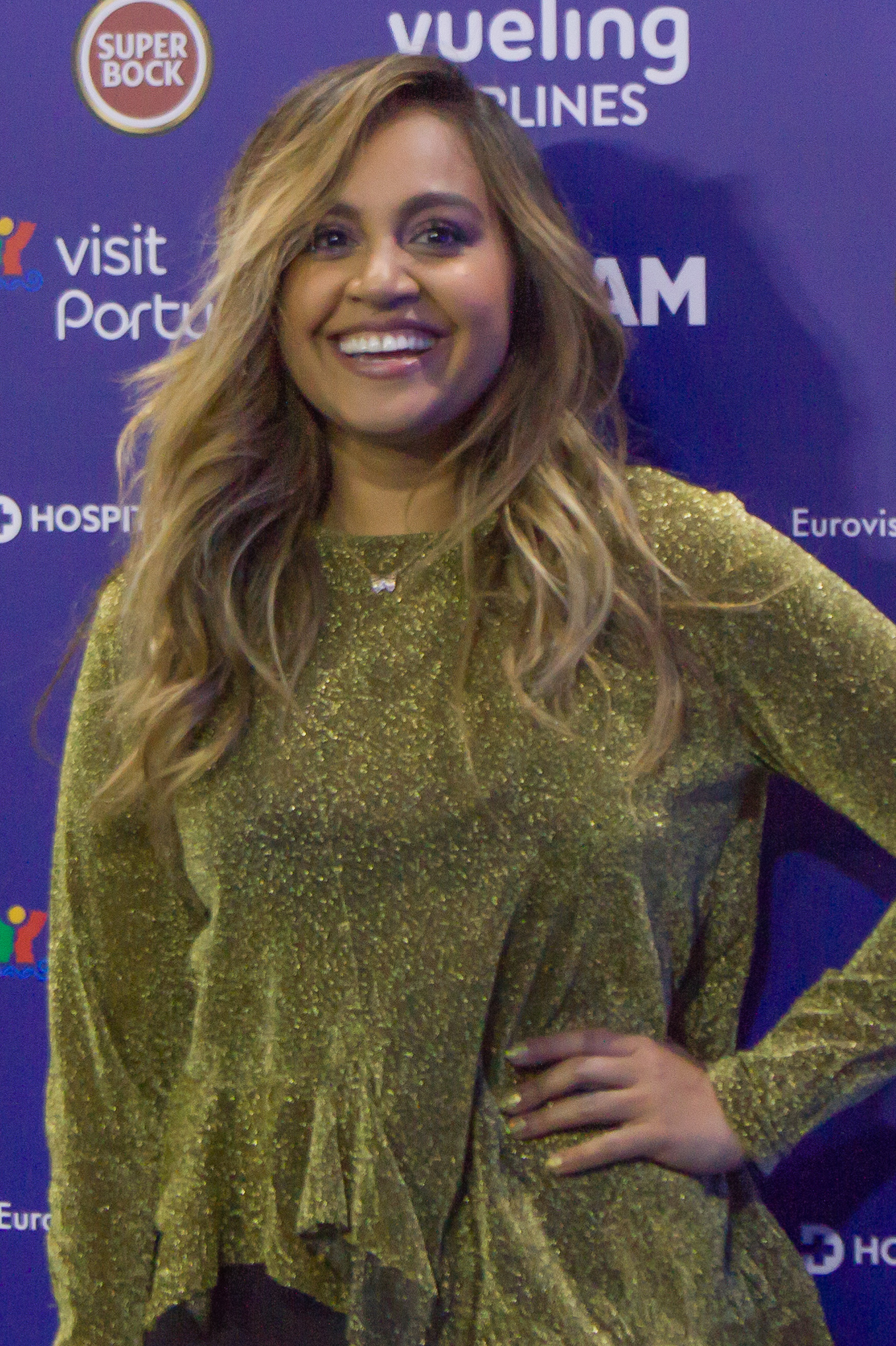
Jessica Mauboy

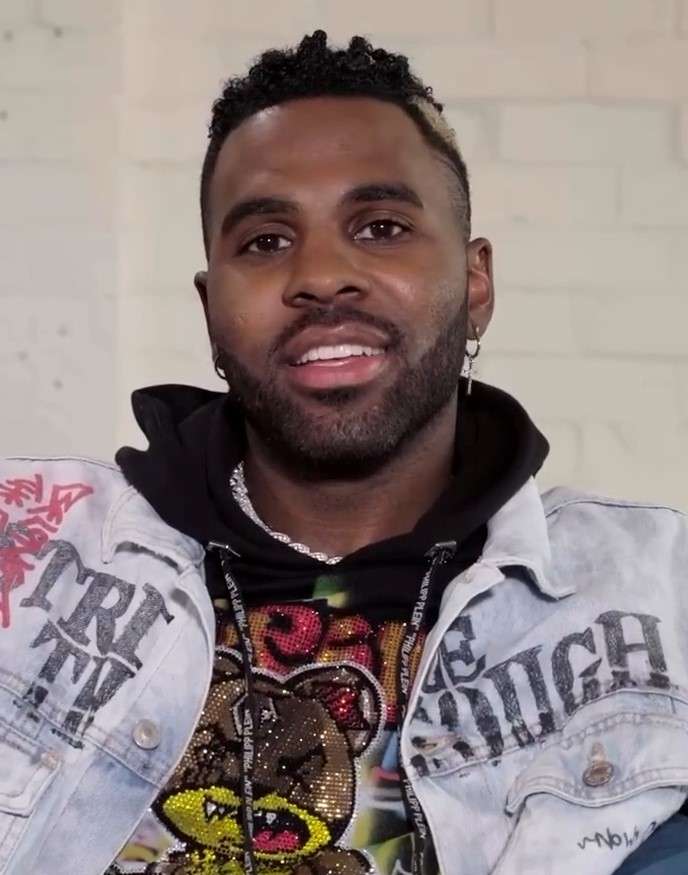
Jason Derulo

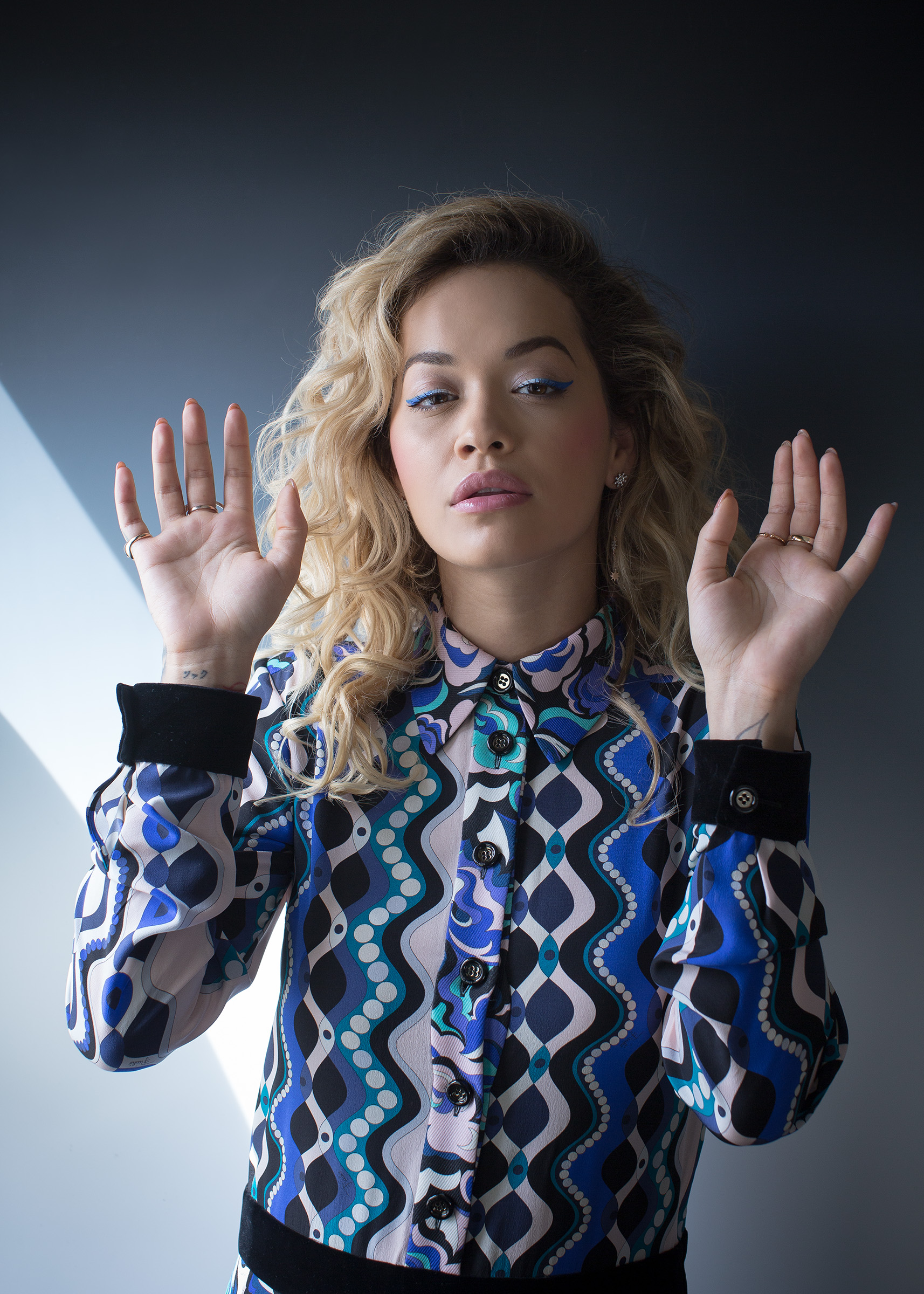
Rita Ora

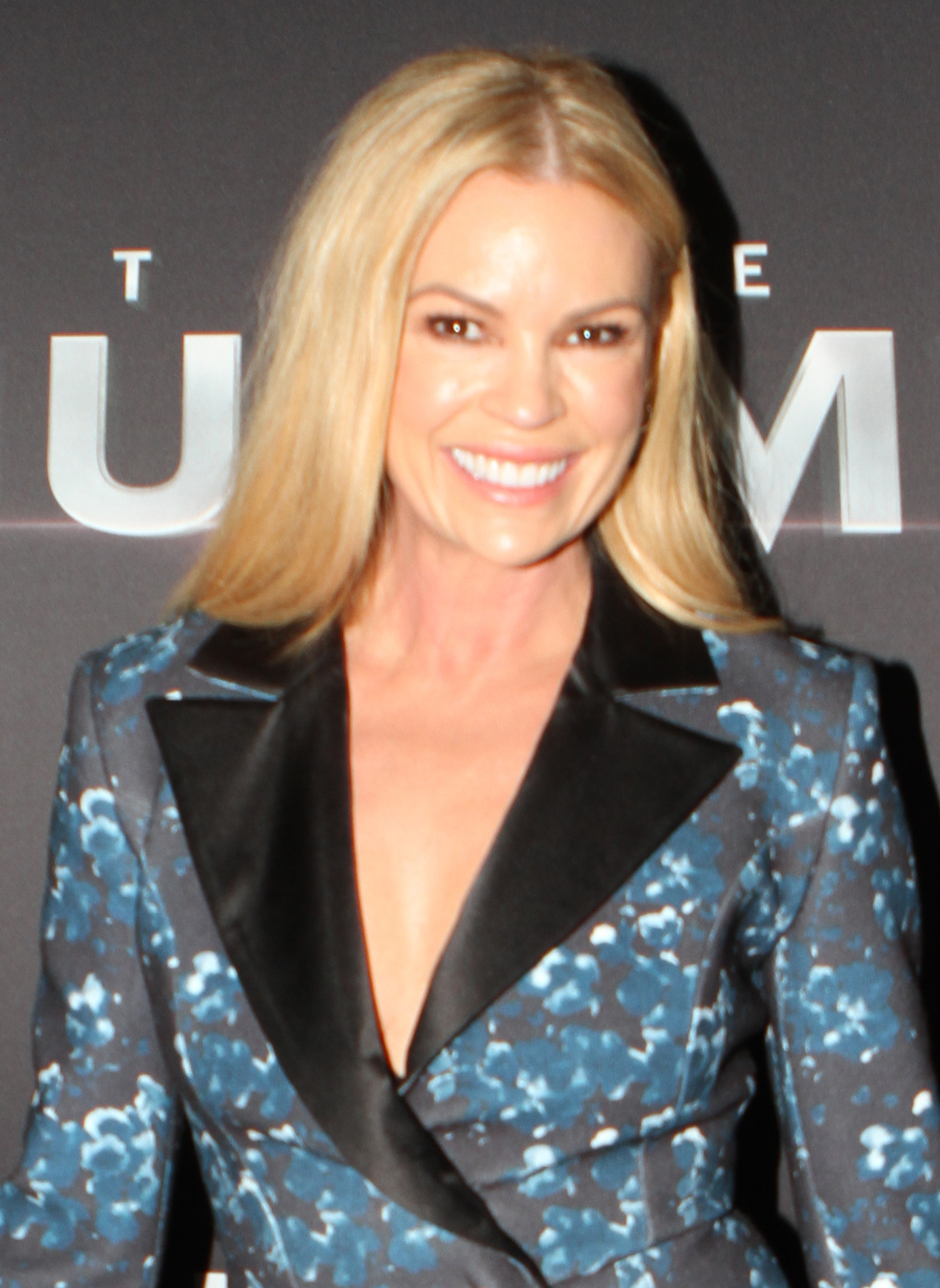
Sonia Kruger

In March 2023, it was announced that Guy Sebastian, Rita Ora, and Jessica Mauboy would all return as coaches for the twelfth season. It was also announced that Jason Derulo would make his debut as a coach this season, replacing Keith Urban. Sonia Kruger returned as host.

== Teams ==
Colour key

- Winner
- Runner-Up
- 3rd place
- 4th place
- Eliminated in the Semifinal
- Eliminated in the Singoffs
- Eliminated in the Battles
- Eliminated in the Ultimate callbacks
- Eliminated in the Callbacks
- Withdrew

Season twelve coaching teams
| Coach | Top 48 Artists | | | | | |
|---|---|---|---|---|---|---|
| Guy Sebastian | | | | | | |
| Guy Sebastian | Charlie Pittman | Bella Mackenzie | Marley Sola | Jaydean Miranda | Elly Poletti | Robbie Hunt |
| Guy Sebastian | Shanae Watson | Michaela Jayde | Maz Green | Overnight | Jaxson Cornell | Libby Worboys |
| Jessica Mauboy | | | | | | |
| Jessica Mauboy | Ezra Williams | David Aumua | Shyjana | Jade Taunton | Giaan Jordan | Dillon Rhodes |
| Jessica Mauboy | The Bushwackers | Sean Millis | Trisha Godinet | Nenah Jones | Tiarose Burgess | Dan Daniels |
| Jason Derulo | | | | | | |
| Jason Derulo | Ethan Beckton | Callum Warrender | Calista Nelmes | Alex Jeans | Andrew Taylor Knight | Etienne Steven |
| Jason Derulo | Maree Mamalis | Jade Talbot | Tee & Raye | Christian Ellis | Charlette Ginu | Caitlyn Bamber |
| Rita Ora | | | | | | |
| Rita Ora | Tarryn Stokes | Emily Kate | Nyree Huyser | Elsa Marilyn | Gezel Bardossi | Levi X |
| Rita Ora | Ben Esber | Nick Cunningham | Brenda Bressed | Gabby Asta | Sihana Haxhnikaj | Cruize Karaitiana |

== Blind auditions ==
In the blind auditions, the coaches complete their teams with 12 members each. Each coach can block another two times, and the coach who is blocked is unable to pitch for the artist. Like last season, a coach can block at any time, even during their pitch, as long as the blocker turned their chair. However, this season, coaches are allowed to block before a coach turns their chair. Also, this season axed the Battle Pass, which was introduced in the previous season.

Blind auditions colour key
| ✔ | Coach hit the "I WANT YOU" button |
| | Artist joined this coach's team |
| | Artist eliminated with no coach pressing "I WANT YOU" button |
| ✘ | Coach pressed "I WANT YOU" button, but was blocked by another coach from getting the artist |
| | Blocked by Guy; Blocked by Jess; Blocked by Jason; Blocked by Rita |

Blind auditions results
| Episode | Order | Artist | Age | Song | Coach's and artist's choices | | | |
| Episode | Order | Artist | Age | Song | Guy | Jess | Jason | Rita |
|---|---|---|---|---|---|---|---|---|
| Episode 1 (Sunday, 6 August) | 1 | Etienne Steven | 19 | "Savage Love" | ✔ | ✔ | ✔ | ✔ |
| Episode 1 (Sunday, 6 August) | 2 | Ethan Beckton | 18 | "Jealous" | ✔ | ✔ | ✔ | ✔ |
| Episode 1 (Sunday, 6 August) | 3 | Chris Watson | 53 | "Jessie's Girl" | — | — | — | — |
| Episode 1 (Sunday, 6 August) | 4 | Overnight | 17-18 | "Larger than Life" | ✔ | ✔ | ✘ | ✔ |
| Episode 1 (Sunday, 6 August) | 5 | Ben Esber | 22 | "Unholy" | ✔ | ✔ | ✔ | ✔ |
| Episode 1 (Sunday, 6 August) | 6 | Andrew Taylor Knight | 24 | "Largo al factotum" | — | — | ✔ | ✔ |
| Episode 1 (Sunday, 6 August) | 7 | Shanae Watson | 21 | "Chandelier" | ✔ | ✔ | ✔ | ✔ |
| Episode 2 (Monday, 7 August) | 1 | Calista Nelmes | 24 | "Remember" | ✔ | ✔ | ✔ | ✘ |
| Episode 2 (Monday, 7 August) | 2 | Levi X | 15 | "Seven Nation Army" | — | — | ✔ | ✔ |
| Episode 2 (Monday, 7 August) | 3 | Ezra Williams | 28 | "About Damn Time" | — | ✔ | — | ✔ |
| Episode 2 (Monday, 7 August) | 4 | Garret Lyon | 31 | "Leave (Get Out)" | — | — | — | — |
| Episode 2 (Monday, 7 August) | 5 | Gezel Bardossi | 12 | "Chain of Fools" | ✔ | ✔ | ✔ | ✔ |
| Episode 3 (Tuesday, 8 August) | 1 | Bella Mackenzie | 18 | "Anti-Hero" | ✔ | ✔ | ✔ | ✔ |
| Episode 3 (Tuesday, 8 August) | 2 | Tiarose Burgess | 20 | "Rich Girl" | — | ✔ | — | — |
| Episode 3 (Tuesday, 8 August) | 3 | Michaela Jayde | 35 | "Who's Lovin' You" | ✔ | ✔ | ✔ | ✔ |
| Episode 3 (Tuesday, 8 August) | 4 | Chris Hodder | 60 | "Stand By Me" | — | — | — | — |
| Episode 3 (Tuesday, 8 August) | 5 | Charlette Ginu | 20 | "Lean On" | ✔ | — | ✔ | ✔ |
| Episode 3 (Tuesday, 8 August) | 6 | Dillon Rhodes | 33 | "Play That Funky Music" | ✔ | ✔ | ✔ | ✔ |
| Episode 3 (Tuesday, 8 August) | 7 | Maree Mamalis | 17 | "Listen Before I Go" | ✘ | ✔ | ✔ | ✔ |
| Episode 4 (Sunday, 13 August) | 1 | Tarryn Stokes | 40 | "She Used to Be Mine" | ✔ | ✔ | ✔ | ✔ |
| Episode 4 (Sunday, 13 August) | 2 | Alex Jeans | 30 | "Never Tear Us Apart" | — | ✔ | ✔ | — |
| Episode 4 (Sunday, 13 August) | 3 | Gilbere Bassin | 70 | "La Vie en rose" | — | — | — | — |
| Episode 4 (Sunday, 13 August) | 4 | Nick Cunningham | 31 | "Down Under" | ✔ | ✔ | ✔ | ✔ |
| Episode 4 (Sunday, 13 August) | 5 | Jessica Luxx | 34 | "Edge of Seventeen" | — | — | — | — |
| Episode 4 (Sunday, 13 August) | 6 | Sean Millis | 22 | "7 Years" | — | ✔ | — | ✔ |
| Episode 4 (Sunday, 13 August) | 7 | Robbie Hunt | 18 | "Forget Me" | ✔ | ✔ | ✘ | ✔ |
| Episode 5 (Monday, 14 August) | 1 | Nyree Huyser | 37 | "Stone Cold" | ✔ | ✔ | ✔ | ✔ |
| Episode 5 (Monday, 14 August) | 2 | Caitlyn Bamber | 16 | "Before I Go" | ✔ | ✔ | ✔ | — |
| Episode 5 (Monday, 14 August) | 3 | Hayley Parker | 38 | "Holding Out for a Hero" | — | — | — | — |
| Episode 5 (Monday, 14 August) | 4 | Sihana Haxhnikaj | 16 | "Nothing Breaks Like A Heart" | — | — | — | ✔ |
| Episode 5 (Monday, 14 August) | 5 | Saba Saliba | N/A | "Disco Jesus" (original song) | — | — | — | — |
| Episode 5 (Monday, 14 August) | 6 | Maz Green | 26 | "Snap" | ✔ | ✔ | — | — |
| Episode 5 (Monday, 14 August) | 7 | David Aumua | 24 | "You Say" | ✘ | ✔ | ✔ | ✔ |
| Episode 6 (Tuesday, 15 August) | 1 | Tee & Raye | 33 | "Don't Let Go" | ✔ | ✔ | ✔ | ✔ |
| Episode 6 (Tuesday, 15 August) | 2 | Scotty Mack | 38 | "Footloose" | — | — | — | — |
| Episode 6 (Tuesday, 15 August) | 3 | Jade Taunton | 23 | "Landslide" | ✔ | ✔ | ✔ | ✔ |
| Episode 6 (Tuesday, 15 August) | 4 | Hugo Allison | 18 | "Missing Piece" | — | — | — | — |
| Episode 6 (Tuesday, 15 August) | 5 | Ebony Ruth | N/A | "Sorry Not Sorry" | — | — | — | — |
| Episode 6 (Tuesday, 15 August) | 6 | Evie Ember | N/A | "Domino" | — | — | — | — |
| Episode 6 (Tuesday, 15 August) | 7 | Jaxson Cornell | 23 | "I Fall Apart" | ✔ | — | — | — |
| Episode 6 (Tuesday, 15 August) | 8 | Cruize Karaitiana | 32 | "Carry On" | — | ✔ | — | ✔ |
| Episode 6 (Tuesday, 15 August) | 9 | Giaan Jordan | 17 | "True Colours" | ✘ | ✔ | — | ✔ |
| Episode 7 (Monday, 21 August) | 1 | Marley Sola | 27 | "Ribbon in the Sky" | ✔ | ✔ | ✔ | ✔ |
| Episode 7 (Monday, 21 August) | 2 | Jade Talbot | 25 | "It's All Coming Back to Me Now" | — | — | ✔ | — |
| Episode 7 (Monday, 21 August) | 3 | Gabby Asta | 19 | "She's All I Wanna Be" | ✔ | — | — | ✔ |
| Episode 7 (Monday, 21 August) | 4 | The Bushwackers | 70-74 | "I Am Australian" | ✔ | ✔ | ✔ | ✔ |
| Episode 7 (Monday, 21 August) | 5 | Elsa Marilyn | 17 | "Big Yellow Taxi" | ✔ | ✔ | ✔ | ✔ |
| Episode 7 (Monday, 21 August) | 6 | Ali Skiba | 33 | "Sound Healing (Improv)" | — | — | — | — |
| Episode 7 (Monday, 21 August) | 7 | Elly Poletti | 32 | "Million Reasons" | ✔ | ✔ | ✔ | ✘ |
| Episode 8 (Tuesday, 22 August) | 1 | Jaydean Miranda | 29 | "Want to Want Me" | ✔ | ✔ | ✔ | ✔ |
| Episode 8 (Tuesday, 22 August) | 2 | Zac & Eliza | 18-20 | "From This Moment On" | — | — | — | — |
| Episode 8 (Tuesday, 22 August) | 3 | Libby Worboys | 19 | "Maniac" | ✔ | ✔ | — | ✔ |
| Episode 8 (Tuesday, 22 August) | 4 | Jake Lyle | 19 | "This Is The Moment" | — | — | — | — |
| Episode 8 (Tuesday, 22 August) | 5 | Sam Harper | 24 | "Late Night Talking" | — | — | — | — |
| Episode 8 (Tuesday, 22 August) | 6 | Jomeca Lafaialii | 21 | "Ain't No Mountain High Enough" | — | — | — | — |
| Episode 8 (Tuesday, 22 August) | 7 | Brenda Bressed | 24 | "Strong Enough" | ✔ | — | — | ✔ |
| Episode 8 (Tuesday, 22 August) | 8 | Trisha Godinet | 31 | "At Last" | ✔ | ✔ | ✔ | ✔ |
| Episode 9 (Wednesday, 23 August) | 1 | Christian Ellis | 20 | "The Best" | — | ✔ | ✔ | ✔ |
| Episode 9 (Wednesday, 23 August) | 2 | Liana Perillo | 32 | "Strong" | — | — | — | — |
| Episode 9 (Wednesday, 23 August) | 3 | Emily Kate | 18 | "Iris" | ✔ | ✔ | ✘ | ✔ |
| Episode 9 (Wednesday, 23 August) | 4 | Georgios Atsalis | 21 | "Stay With Me" | — | — | — | Team full |
| Episode 9 (Wednesday, 23 August) | 5 | Bronte Horswood | 21 | "Express Yourself" | — | — | — | Team full |
| Episode 9 (Wednesday, 23 August) | 6 | Josh Tribuzio | 22 | "Ghost" | — | — | — | Team full |
| Episode 9 (Wednesday, 23 August) | 7 | Topanga Lyla | N/A | "Midnight Sky" | — | — | — | Team full |
| Episode 9 (Wednesday, 23 August) | 8 | Ben Rainford | N/A | "Songbird" | — | — | — | Team full |
| Episode 9 (Wednesday, 23 August) | 9 | Kai Lloyd-Jones | 17 | "My My My! | — | — | — | Team full |
| Episode 9 (Wednesday, 23 August) | 10 | Charlie Pittman | 25 | "How Do I Say Goodbye" | ✔ | ✔ | ✔ | Team full |
| Episode 10 (Sunday, 27 August) | 1 | Shyjana | 24 | "Castles" | Team full | ✔ | ✔ | Team full |
| Episode 10 (Sunday, 27 August) | 2 | Grace Callaghan | 24 | "Beauty and the Beast" | Team full | — | — | Team full |
| Episode 10 (Sunday, 27 August) | 3 | Dan Daniels | 58 | "Ring of Fire" | Team full | ✔ | ✔ | Team full |
| Episode 10 (Sunday, 27 August) | 4 | Callum Warrender | 28 | "The Impossible Dream" | Team full | ✔ | ✔ | Team full |
| Episode 10 (Sunday, 27 August) | 5 | Candice Casagrande | 37 | "Fields of Gold" | Team full | — | Team full | Team full |
| Episode 10 (Sunday, 27 August) | 6 | Chloe Thomson | 29 | "My Sharona" | Team full | — | Team full | Team full |
| Episode 10 (Sunday, 27 August) | 7 | Harry | N/A | "Lovely" | Team full | — | Team full | Team full |
| Episode 10 (Sunday, 27 August) | 8 | Renee | N/A | "Dangerous Woman" | Team full | — | Team full | Team full |
| Episode 10 (Sunday, 27 August) | 9 | Nenah Jones | 18 | "Heroes" | Team full | ✔ | Team full | Team full |

- Shanae Watson did not apply for The Voice, but was brought in to audition after her father, Chris, encouraged her.

== Callbacks ==
The callbacks aired on 28 and 29 August. Coaches form four groups of three, with one going straight home, one going straight through to the battles, and one going to the ultimate callbacks for a final decision before the battles.

Callbacks colour key
| Artist was chosen to advance to the battles |
| Artist was sent to the ultimate callbacks |
| Artist was eliminated |

Callbacks results
| Episode | Order | Coach | Theme | Song | Winner | Losers | Songs |
|---|---|---|---|---|---|---|---|
| Episode 11 (Monday, 28 August) | 1 | Guy | Aretha Franklin | "You'll Never Walk Alone" | Marley Sola | Michaela Jayde | "(You Make Me Feel Like) A Natural Woman" |
| Episode 11 (Monday, 28 August) | 1 | Guy | Aretha Franklin | "You'll Never Walk Alone" | Marley Sola | Libby Worboys | "I Say a Little Prayer" |
| Episode 11 (Monday, 28 August) | 2 | Jason | Katy Perry | "Dark Horse" | Maree Mamalis | Calista Nelmes | "When I'm Gone" |
| Episode 11 (Monday, 28 August) | 2 | Jason | Katy Perry | "Dark Horse" | Maree Mamalis | Caitlyn Bamber | "The One That Got Away" |
| Episode 11 (Monday, 28 August) | 3 | Rita | Greatest collaborations of all time | "Bang Bang" | Nyree Huyser | Ben Esber | "lovely" |
| Episode 11 (Monday, 28 August) | 3 | Rita | Greatest collaborations of all time | "Bang Bang" | Nyree Huyser | Cruize Karaitiana | "Eastside" |
| Episode 11 (Monday, 28 August) | 4 | Jess | Songs performed by them on their TikTok | "Imagine" | David Aumua | Sean Millis | "Bruises" |
| Episode 11 (Monday, 28 August) | 4 | Jess | Songs performed by them on their TikTok | "Imagine" | David Aumua | Dan Daniels | "Somewhere Over the Rainbow" |
| Episode 11 (Monday, 28 August) | 5 | Rita | Old songs for the younger singers | "Songbird" | Elsa Marilyn | Gezel Bardossi | "Mercy" |
| Episode 11 (Monday, 28 August) | 5 | Rita | Old songs for the younger singers | "Songbird" | Elsa Marilyn | Sihana Haxhnikaj | "Ain't No Sunshine" |
| Episode 11 (Monday, 28 August) | 6 | Jason | Uniqueness | "Bring Him Home" | Andrew Taylor Knight | Alex Jeans | "Bed of Roses" |
| Episode 11 (Monday, 28 August) | 6 | Jason | Uniqueness | "Bring Him Home" | Andrew Taylor Knight | Charlette Ginu | "Levitating" |
| Episode 11 (Monday, 28 August) | 7 | Jess | Songs by Aussie icons | "Run to Paradise" | Giaan Jordan | The Bushwackers | "Solid Rock" |
| Episode 11 (Monday, 28 August) | 7 | Jess | Songs by Aussie icons | "Run to Paradise" | Giaan Jordan | Tiarose Burgess | "Hopelessly Devoted to You" |
| Episode 11 (Monday, 28 August) | 8 | Guy | Miley Cyrus | "Slide Away" | Bella Mackenzie | Robbie Hunt | "Wrecking Ball" |
| Episode 11 (Monday, 28 August) | 8 | Guy | Miley Cyrus | "Slide Away" | Bella Mackenzie | Jaxson Cornell | "Flowers" |
| Episode 12 (Tuesday, 29 August) | 1 | Rita | Cher | "The Winner Takes It All" | Tarryn Stokes | Emily Kate | "Believe" |
| Episode 12 (Tuesday, 29 August) | 1 | Rita | Cher | "The Winner Takes It All" | Tarryn Stokes | Gabby Asta | "If I Could Turn Back Time" |
| Episode 12 (Tuesday, 29 August) | 2 | Jason | UK pop icons | "Let It Go" | Ethan Beckton | Jade Talbot | "Set Fire to the Rain" |
| Episode 12 (Tuesday, 29 August) | 2 | Jason | UK pop icons | "Let It Go" | Ethan Beckton | Christian Ellis | "Perfect" |
| Episode 12 (Tuesday, 29 August) | 3 | Guy | Group songs | "Emotion" | Elly Poletti | Jaydean Miranda | "I'll Be There" |
| Episode 12 (Tuesday, 29 August) | 3 | Guy | Group songs | "Emotion" | Elly Poletti | Overnight | "What Makes You Beautiful" |
| Episode 12 (Tuesday, 29 August) | 4 | Jess | Lady Gaga | "I'll Never Love Again" | Jade Taunton | Shyjana | "Rain on Me" |
| Episode 12 (Tuesday, 29 August) | 4 | Jess | Lady Gaga | "I'll Never Love Again" | Jade Taunton | Nenah Jones | "Always Remember Us This Way" |
| Episode 12 (Tuesday, 29 August) | 5 | Jason | Michael Jackson | "Man In The Mirror" | Etienne Steven | Callum Warrender | "Ben" |
| Episode 12 (Tuesday, 29 August) | 5 | Jason | Michael Jackson | "Man In The Mirror" | Etienne Steven | Tee & Raye | "Thriller" |
| Episode 12 (Tuesday, 29 August) | 6 | Rita | Disco | "I Will Survive" | Levi X | Nick Cunningham | "Young Hearts Run Free" |
| Episode 12 (Tuesday, 29 August) | 6 | Rita | Disco | "I Will Survive" | Levi X | Brenda Bressed | "How Will I Know" |
| Episode 12 (Tuesday, 29 August) | 7 | Guy | Radio ready | "Teenage Dream" | Charlie Pittman | Shanae Watson | "Stronger" |
| Episode 12 (Tuesday, 29 August) | 7 | Guy | Radio ready | "Teenage Dream" | Charlie Pittman | Maz Green | "4ever" |
| Episode 12 (Tuesday, 29 August) | 8 | Jess | James Brown | "Papa's Got A Brand New Bag" | Dillon Rhodes | Ezra Williams | "I Got You (I Feel Good)" |
| Episode 12 (Tuesday, 29 August) | 8 | Jess | James Brown | "Papa's Got A Brand New Bag" | Dillon Rhodes | Trisha Godinet | "It's A Man's Man's Man's World" |

=== Ultimate callbacks ===
The ultimate callbacks aired on 3 September. Coaches form two groups of two from the artists that did not advance from the callbacks nor were eliminated. In a make-or-break sing off, one from each group advances to the battles, while the other is eliminated.

Ultimate callbacks colour key
| Artist won the ultimate callback and advanced to the battles |
| Artist lost the ultimate callback and was eliminated |
| Artist withdrew from the competition |

Ultimate callbacks
| Episode | Order | Coach | Theme | Winner | Song | Loser | Song |
|---|---|---|---|---|---|---|---|
| Episode 13 (Sunday, 3 September) | 1 | Jason | Swap styles | Calista Nelmes | "Skyscraper" | | |
| Episode 13 (Sunday, 3 September) | 1 | Jason | Swap styles | Calista Nelmes | "Skyscraper" | Jade Talbot | "The Edge of Glory" |
| Episode 13 (Sunday, 3 September) | 2 | Guy | Elvis Presley | Robbie Hunt | "Blue Suede Shoes" | | |
| Episode 13 (Sunday, 3 September) | 2 | Guy | Elvis Presley | Robbie Hunt | "Blue Suede Shoes" | Shanae Watson | "Can't Help Falling In Love" |
| Episode 13 (Sunday, 3 September) | 3 | Jess | 80s rock | Ezra Williams | "Love Is a Battlefield" | | |
| Episode 13 (Sunday, 3 September) | 3 | Jess | 80s rock | Ezra Williams | "Love Is a Battlefield" | The Bushwackers | "Dumb Things" |
| Episode 13 (Sunday, 3 September) | 4 | Rita | Britney Spears | Gezel Bardossi | "Toxic" | | |
| Episode 13 (Sunday, 3 September) | 4 | Rita | Britney Spears | Gezel Bardossi | "Toxic" | Ben Esber | "…Baby One More Time" |
| Episode 13 (Sunday, 3 September) | 5 | Jess | Vulnerability | Shyjana | "People Help the People" | | |
| Episode 13 (Sunday, 3 September) | 5 | Jess | Vulnerability | Shyjana | "People Help the People" | Sean Millis | "Leave a Light On" |
| Episode 13 (Sunday, 3 September) | 6 | Guy | Bruno Mars | Jaydean Miranda | "Leave the Door Open" | | |
| Episode 13 (Sunday, 3 September) | 6 | Guy | Bruno Mars | Jaydean Miranda | "Leave the Door Open" | Michaela Jayde | "When I Was Your Man" |
| Episode 13 (Sunday, 3 September) | 7 | Rita | Country artists | Emily Kate | "I Will Always Love You" | | |
| Episode 13 (Sunday, 3 September) | 7 | Rita | Country artists | Emily Kate | "I Will Always Love You" | Nick Cunningham | "Last Night" |
| Episode 13 (Sunday, 3 September) | 8 | Jason | Aerosmith | Alex Jeans | "Dream On" | N/A | |
| Episode 13 (Sunday, 3 September) | 8 | Jason | Aerosmith | Callum Warrender | "I Don't Want to Miss a Thing" | N/A | |

== Battles ==
The Battles aired on 10 September and 17 September. In the battles, coaches are to cut their team to 2 artists by pairing their artists to sing the same song as a duet.

Team Guy and Jason performed on the first night of battles and Team Jess and Rita performed on the second night.

Battles colour key
| Artist won the battle and advances straight to the Semifinal |
| Artist won the battle and advances to the Singoffs |
| Artist lost the battle and was eliminated |

Battles results
| Episode | Order | Coach | Winner | Song | Loser |
|---|---|---|---|---|---|
| Episode 14 (Sunday, 10 September) | 1 | Jason | Calista Nelmes | "Fall In Line" | Maree Mamalis |
| Episode 14 (Sunday, 10 September) | 2 | Guy | Charlie Pittman | "Chasing Cars" | Robbie Hunt |
| Episode 14 (Sunday, 10 September) | 3 | Jason | Ethan Beckton | "Ceilings" | Etienne Steven |
| Episode 14 (Sunday, 10 September) | 4 | Guy | Marley Sola | "I Can't Make You Love Me" | Elly Poletti |
| Episode 14 (Sunday, 10 September) | 5 | Guy | Bella Mackenzie | "The Bones" | Jaydean Miranda |
| Episode 14 (Sunday, 10 September) | 6 | Jason | Callum Warrender | "You Raise Me Up" | N/A |
| Episode 14 (Sunday, 10 September) | 6 | Jason | Andrew Taylor Knight | "You Raise Me Up" | N/A |
| Episode 14 (Sunday, 10 September) | 6 | Jason | Alex Jeans | "You Raise Me Up" | N/A |
| Episode 15 (Sunday, 17 September) | 1 | Rita | Tarryn Stokes | "Alone" | N/A |
| Episode 15 (Sunday, 17 September) | 1 | Rita | Nyree Huyser | "Alone" | N/A |
| Episode 15 (Sunday, 17 September) | 2 | Jess | Ezra Williams | "Feel It Still" | Dillon Rhodes |
| Episode 15 (Sunday, 17 September) | 3 | Jess | David Aumua | "What About Us" | Jade Taunton |
| Episode 15 (Sunday, 17 September) | 4 | Rita | Emily Kate | "Tainted Love" | Levi X |
| Episode 15 (Sunday, 17 September) | 5 | Jess | Shyjana | "Hold On" | Giaan Jordan |
| Episode 15 (Sunday, 17 September) | 6 | Rita | N/A | "Somebody That I Used to Know" | Gezel Bardossi |
| Episode 15 (Sunday, 17 September) | 6 | Rita | N/A | "Somebody That I Used to Know" | Elsa Marilyn |

=== Singoffs ===
In the Singoffs, coaches pick one of their battle winners to go straight through the Semifinals. Then the remaining artists must Singoff for the last remaining spot on their team to advance to the semifinal.

Singoffs colour key
| Artist was chosen to advance to the Semifinal |
| Artist was eliminated |

Singoffs results
| Episode | Order | Coach | Song | Winner | Loser(s) | Song |
|---|---|---|---|---|---|---|
| Episode 14 (Sunday, 10 September) | 1 | Guy | "Don't Stop Believin'" | Bella Mackenzie | Marley Sola | "This City" |
| Episode 14 (Sunday, 10 September) | 2 | Jason | "Into the Unknown" | Callum Warrender | Calista Nelmes | "Mamma Knows Best" |
| Episode 14 (Sunday, 10 September) | 2 | Jason | "Into the Unknown" | Callum Warrender | Alex Jeans | "Falling" |
| Episode 14 (Sunday, 10 September) | 2 | Jason | "Into the Unknown" | Callum Warrender | Andrew Taylor Knight | "Nessun dorma" |
| Episode 15 (Sunday, 17 September) | 1 | Rita | "Anyone" | Tarryn Stokes | Nyree Huyser | "Forever Young" |
| Episode 15 (Sunday, 17 September) | 2 | Jess | "Another One Bites The Dust" | Ezra Williams | Shyjana | "Use Somebody" |

== Finals ==
=== Semi-final ===
The Semifinal aired on 24 September. The 8 remaining artists sing different songs for a place in the Grand Final. At the end of the episode, coaches are only allowed to pick one artist from their team to advance to the Grand Final.

Semi-final results
| Order | Coach | Contestant | Song | Result |
|---|---|---|---|---|
| 1 | Jess | Ezra Williams | "Afraid to Feel" | Saved by coach |
| 2 | Rita | Tarryn Stokes | "The Scientist" | Saved by coach |
| 3 | Guy | Bella Mackenzie | "Two Strong Hearts" | Eliminated |
| 4 | Jason | Ethan Beckton | "Train Wreck" | Saved by coach |
| 5 | Jess | David Aumua | "I Won't Give Up" | Eliminated |
| 6 | Rita | Emily Kate | "Can't Get You Out of My Head" | Eliminated |
| 7 | Guy | Charlie Pittman | "Take On Me" | Saved by coach |
| 8 | Jason | Callum Warrender | "Never Enough" | Eliminated |

=== Grand Finale ===
The Grand Finale was broadcast on 8 October 2023. Each artist performed a solo song and a duet with their coach. Similar to the last three seasons, this was the only episode of the season where the results were determined by public vote and not by the coaches. Tarryn Stokes was declared the winner, marking Rita Ora's second consecutive win as a coach and tied with Seal, Delta Goodrem, and Kelly Rowland with the most wins on the Australian version of The Voice.

Finale results
| Coach | Contestant | Order | Solo song | Order | Duet song | Result |
|---|---|---|---|---|---|---|
| Jessica Mauboy | Ezra Williams | 1 | "Don't Go Yet" | 5 | "As It Was" | Runner-Up |
| Rita Ora | Tarryn Stokes | 8 | "All by Myself" | 2 | "The Best" | Winner |
| Jason Derulo | Ethan Beckton | 6 | "Eyes Closed" | 3 | "Someone You Loved" | 4th Place |
| Guy Sebastian | Charlie Pittman | 4 | "When You're Gone" | 7 | "Torn" | 3rd Place |

== Ratings ==
Colour key:

– Highest rating during the season
– Lowest rating during the season

The Voice season twelve consolidated viewership and adjusted position
| Episode | | Original airdate | Timeslot | Metro Overnight TV Viewers | Night Rank | Total TV Viewers | Night Rank | Source |
|---|---|---|---|---|---|---|---|---|
| 1 | "Blind Auditions" | 6 August 2023 | Sunday 7:00 pm | 716,000 | 4 | 1,338,000 | 3 | |
| 2 | "Blind Auditions" | 7 August 2023 | Monday 7:00 pm | 789,000 | 6 | 1,461,000 | 4 | |
| 3 | "Blind Auditions" | 8 August 2023 | Tuesday 7:30 pm | 624,000 | 6 | 1,196,000 | 4 | |
| 4 | "Blind Auditions" | 13 August 2023 | Sunday 7:00 pm | 789,000 | 3 | 1,433,000 | 3 | |
| 5 | "Blind Auditions" | 14 August 2023 | Monday 7:30 pm | 656,000 | 7 | 1,252,000 | 4 | |
| 6 | "Blind Auditions" | 15 August 2023 | Tuesday 7:30 pm | 662,000 | 5 | 1,242,000 | 3 | |
| 7 | "Blind Auditions" | 21 August 2023 | Monday 7:30 pm | 681,000 | 5 | 1,266,000 | 3 | |
| 8 | "Blind Auditions" | 22 August 2023 | Tuesday 7:30 pm | 684,000 | 5 | 1,249,000 | 3 | |
| 9 | "Blind Auditions" | 23 August 2023 | Wednesday 7:30 pm | 589,000 | 6 | 1,155,000 | 4 | |
| 10 | "Blind Auditions" | 27 August 2023 | Sunday 7:00 pm | 705,000 | 4 | 1,272,000 | 3 | |
| 11 | "Callbacks" | 28 August 2023 | Monday 7:30pm | 666,000 | 6 | 1,264,000 | 3 | |
| 12 | "Callbacks" | 29 August 2023 | Tuesday 7:30pm | 661,000 | 6 | 1,302,000 | 3 | |
| 13 | "Ultimate Callback" | 3 September 2023 | Sunday 7:00pm | 694,000 | 4 | 1,282,000 | 2 | |
| 14 | "Battles" | 10 September 2023 | Sunday 7:00pm | 725,000 | 4 | 1,312,000 | 4 | |
| 15 | "Battles" | 17 September 2023 | Sunday 7:00pm | 653,000 | 4 | 1,233,000 | 3 | |
| 16 | "Semi-final" | 24 September 2023 | Sunday 7:00pm | 606,000 | 4 | 1,130,000 | 4 | |
| 17 | "The Grand Finale" | 8 October 2023 | Sunday 7:00pm | 740,000 | 3 | 1,324,000 | 3 | |
| 17 | "Winner Announced" | 8 October 2023 | Sunday 7:00pm | 783,000 | 2 | 1,348,000 | 2 | |
