= The Voice (Australian TV series) season 13 =

Season of television series

The Voice
- Season 13
- Promotional poster featuring coaches Sebastian, Rimes, Miller-Heidke, and Lambert
- Hosted by: Sonia Kruger
- Coaches: Guy Sebastian; LeAnn Rimes; Kate Miller-Heidke; Adam Lambert
- Winner: Reuben De Melo
- Winning coach: LeAnn Rimes
- Runners-up: Jaedyn Randell, SKŸE and Annie Jones,

Release
- Original network: Seven Network
- Original release: 19 August – 27 October 2024

Season chronology
- ← Previous; Season 12 Next → Season 14

The thirteenth season of The Voice Australia began airing on 19 August 2024. On 18 October 2023, it was confirmed that Seven Network had picked up the show for its thirteenth season, set to broadcast on 19 August 2024. On 6 February 2024, it was revealed on the show's social media that only Guy Sebastian would return as a coach from the previous season for the thirteenth season. At the same time, it was announced that LeAnn Rimes, Kate Miller-Heidke, and Adam Lambert would debut as coaches, replacing Rita Ora, Jessica Mauboy, and Jason Derulo, respectively. Sonia Kruger returned as host for her ninth season.

Similar to the previous three seasons, the finale was pre-recorded and the winner was determined by a viewer poll. Reuben De Melo was declared the winner, marking LeAnn Rimes' first and only win as a coach. Rimes became the fourth coach to win on their debut season following Seal, will.i.am and Jessie J. Rimes also became the second coach to win in their exclusive season, following will.i.am in season 3. Additionally, De Melo became the first winning artist that had a coach use the Ultimate Block in their blind audition (from LeAnn Rimes).

== Overview ==
=== Coaches and host ===
On 6 February 2024, it was announced that Guy Sebastian would return as a coach for the thirteenth season for his sixth season. Meanwhile, three debuting coaches joined this season: LeAnn Rimes, Kate Miller-Heidke and Adam Lambert. Sonia Kruger returned as host.

Coaches and host of season 13

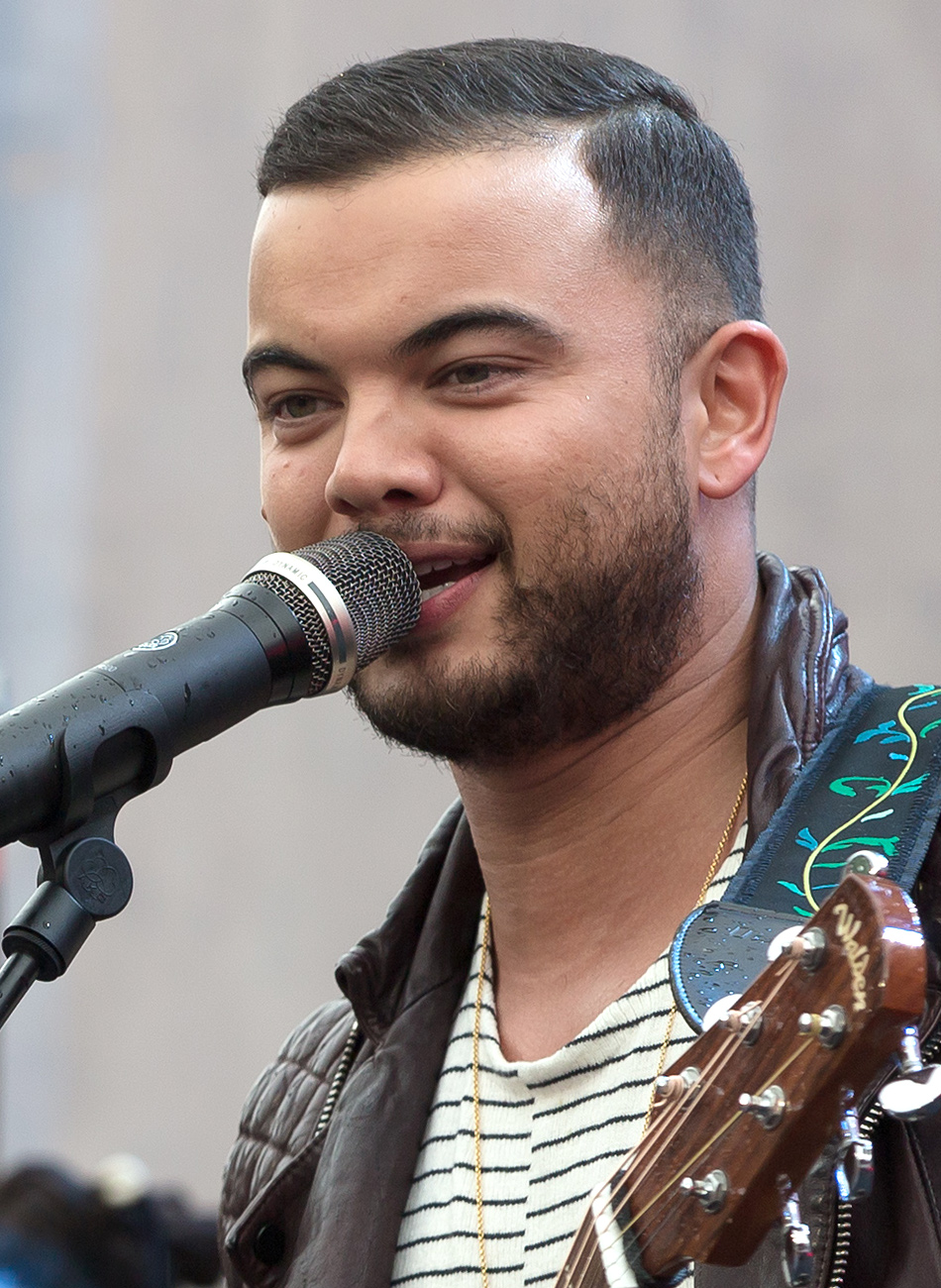
Guy Sebastian

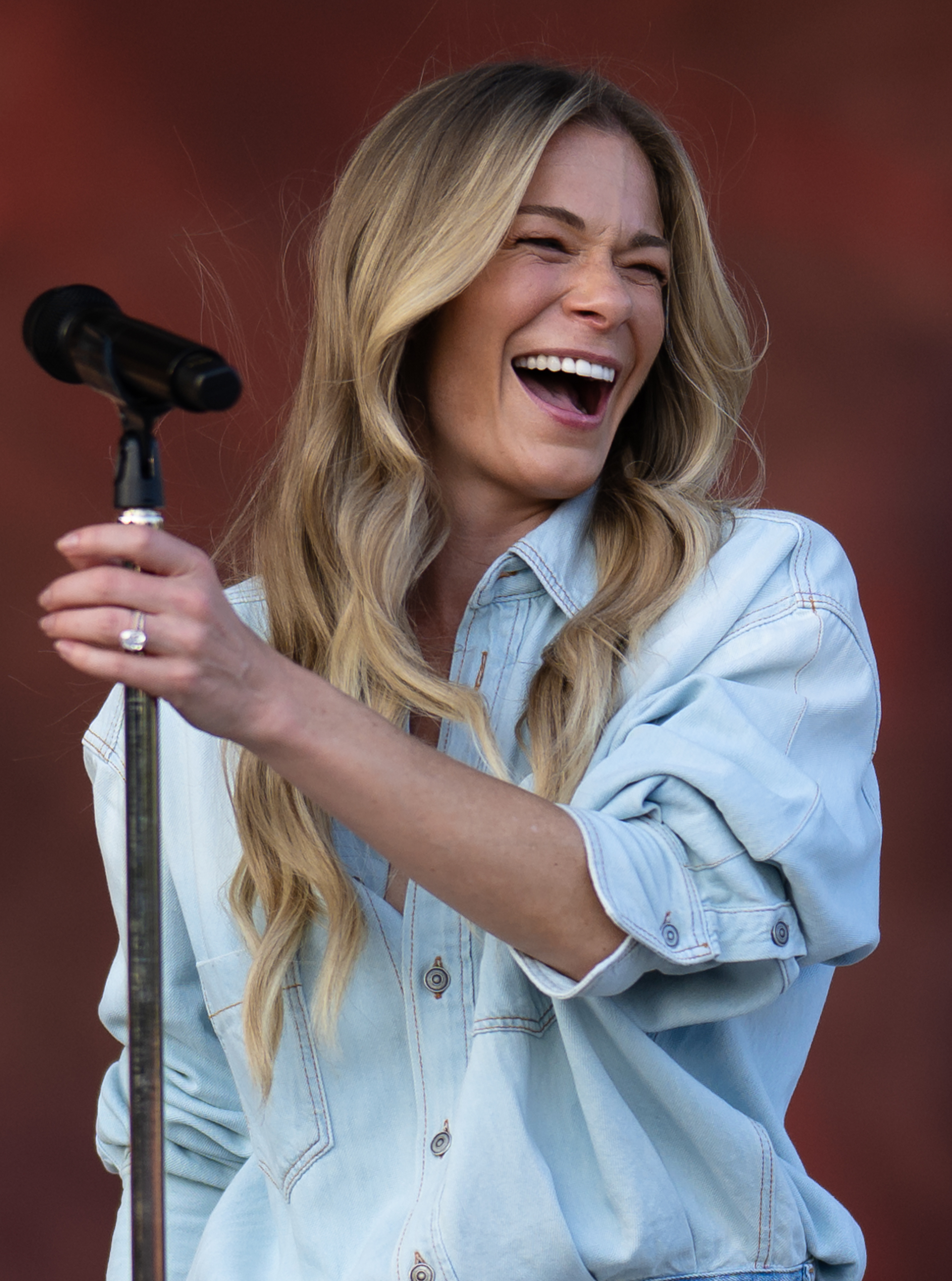
LeAnn Rimes

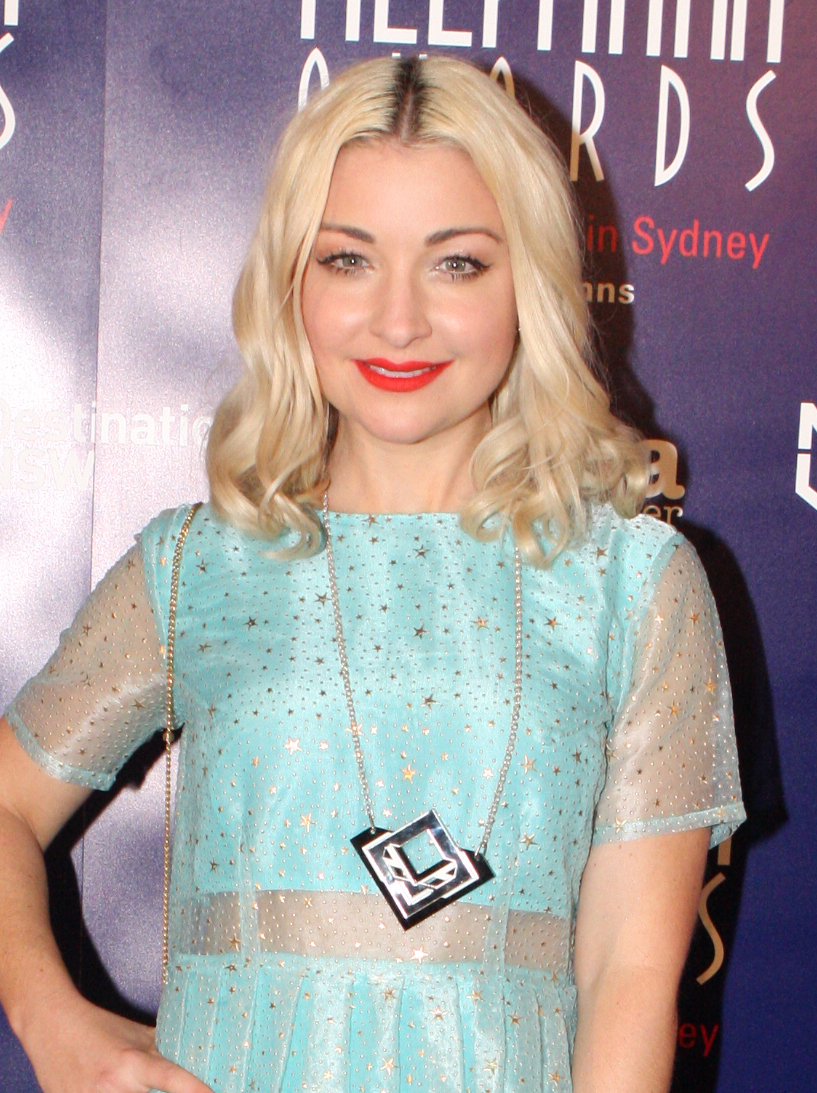
Kate Miller-Heidke

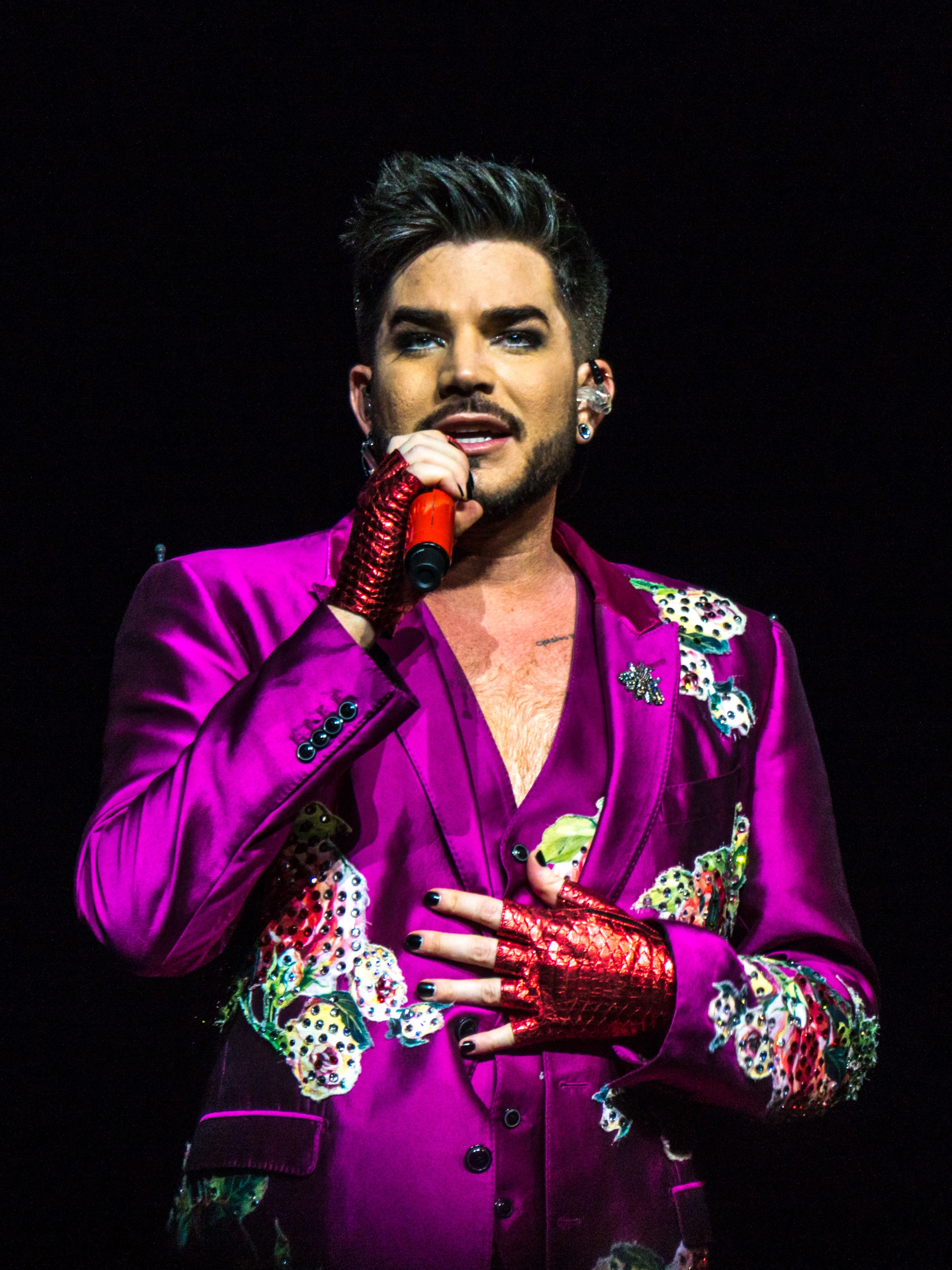
Adam Lambert

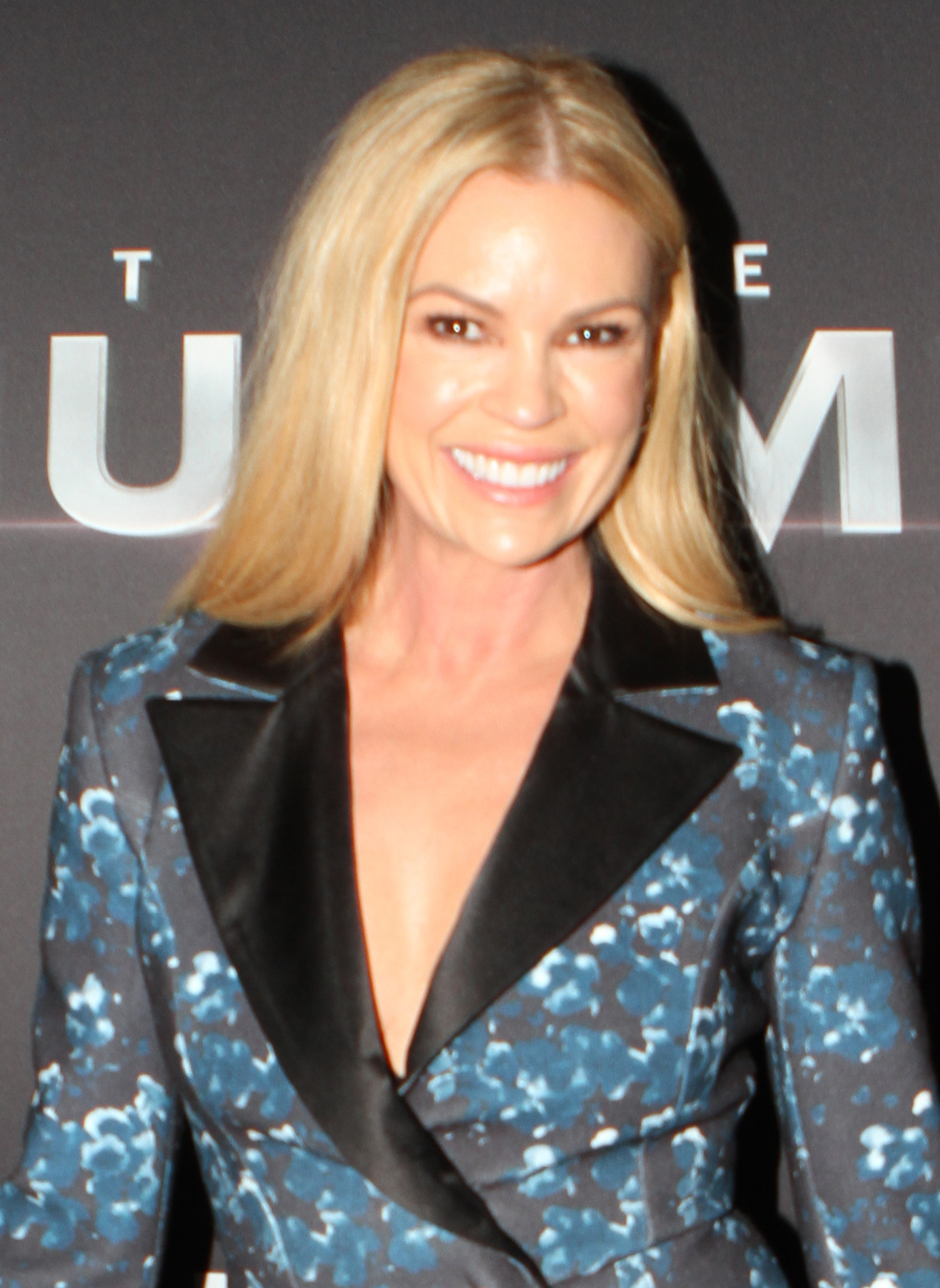
Sonia Kruger

=== Rule change ===
In this season, a new button Ultimate Block was introduced. The feature is similar to the super block in the second season of The Voice Kids Italy, which instantly blocks other coaches and default the artist to the blocker's team.

== Teams ==
Colour key

- Winner
- Runner-Up
- 3rd place
- 4th place
- Eliminated in the Semifinals
- Eliminated in the Showdowns
- Eliminated in the Knockouts
- Stolen in the Battles
- Selected by another coach as their wildcard
- Eliminated in the Battles
- Withdrew

Season thirteen coaching teams
Coach	Top 48 Artists				
Guy Sebastian					
Guy Sebastian	SKŸE	Jaydin Shingleton	Roland Williams	Beau Shearer	James Vass
Guy Sebastian	Priscilla Stanley	Shannen Wick	~~Arthur Hull~~	Eden Borrie	Hannah Sands
Guy Sebastian	Kyle Wilson	Paea Havilli			
LeAnn Rimes					
LeAnn Rimes	Reuben De Melo	Letitia Butler	Brad & Tori	Amber Sindoni	Cookie Robinson
LeAnn Rimes	Duncan Toombs	Laura Glynn	~~Michael & Violeta~~	Annaleese Fuda	Larissa Kovalchuk
LeAnn Rimes	Natalie Colavito				
Kate Miller-Heidke					
Kate Miller-Heidke	Jaedyn Randell	Tom Leeming	Jaymee Lancaster	Elias Lanyon	Michael & Violeta
Kate Miller-Heidke	Nethra Raman	Yorke Heath	Matthew Hearne	Falon Moore	Jenna Hudson
Kate Miller-Heidke	Liz Player	MJ O'Doherty	Mol Turner	Tia Barnes	
Adam Lambert					
Adam Lambert	Annie Jones	Siena Fodera	Arthur Hull	Chloe Kay	Cody Gunton
Adam Lambert	Lana Sayah	Stephanie Milostic	~~Tom Leeming~~	Aaron Hayward	Kaitlyn Martin
Adam Lambert	Queency	Ruby Lafferty	Teza McKenna		
Note: Italicised names are artists stolen from another team during the battles (names struck through within former teams). Underlined names are artists saved by their coach during the battles.

== Blind auditions ==
In the blind auditions, the coaches complete their teams with 12 members each. The block returned from last season, but with a twist. Each coach now only has one main block that they can use to block another coach. However, each coach gets one additional block, dubbed the Ultimate Block, which blocks all other turned coaches, defaulting the artist to their team. With either block, the coach who is blocked is null and invalid to pitch for the artist. Like last season, a coach can block at any time, even during their pitch, as long as the coach turned their chair.

Blind auditions colour key
✔	Coach hit the "I WANT YOU" button
	Artist joined this coach's team
	Artist eliminated with no coach pressing "I WANT YOU" button
✘	All other coaches blocked from one coach pressing the Ultimate Block
✘	Coach pressed "I WANT YOU" button, but was blocked by another coach from getting the artist
	Blocked by Guy; Blocked by LeAnn; Blocked by Kate; Blocked by Adam

Blind auditions results
Episode	Order	Artist	Age	Song	Coach's and artist's choices			
Episode	Order	Artist	Age	Song	Guy	LeAnn	Kate	Adam
Episode 1 (Monday, 19 August)	1	Shannen Wick	31	"Stop!"	✔	✔	✔	✔
Episode 1 (Monday, 19 August)	2	Elias Lanyon	20	"Daylight"	✔	✔	✔	—
Episode 1 (Monday, 19 August)	3	James Vass	20	"Love In The Dark"	✔	✔	✔	—
Episode 1 (Monday, 19 August)	4	Lana Sayah	32	"Good Luck"	✔	✔	✔	✔
Episode 1 (Monday, 19 August)	5	Manawa Randall	19	"How Do I Live"	—	—	—	—
Episode 1 (Monday, 19 August)	6	Teza McKenna	61	"Rebel Yell"	—	—	—	✔
Episode 1 (Monday, 19 August)	7	Reuben De Melo	31	"I See Fire"	✘	✔	✘	✘
Episode 2 (Tuesday, 20 August)	1	Beau Shearer	16	"Something in the Orange"	✔	✔	✔	✔
Episode 2 (Tuesday, 20 August)	2	Tia Barnes	25	"Life Goes On"	✔	✔	✔	✔
Episode 2 (Tuesday, 20 August)	3	Kyle Wilson	25	"Sexy and I Know It"	✔	—	—	—
Episode 2 (Tuesday, 20 August)	4	Jason Robertson	51	"The Horses"	—	—	—	—
Episode 2 (Tuesday, 20 August)	5	Ruby Lafferty	18	"Right Here, Right Now"	—	—	✘	✔
Episode 2 (Tuesday, 20 August)	6	Jamino	47	"Could You Be Loved"	—	—	—	—
Episode 2 (Tuesday, 20 August)	7	Michael & Violeta	20-33	"When the Party's Over"	✔	✔	✔	✔
Episode 3 (Wednesday, 21 August)	1	Chloe Kay	26	"It's a Man's Man's Man's World"	✔	✔	✔	✔
Episode 3 (Wednesday, 21 August)	2	Priscilla Stanley	25	"Battle Scars"	✔	—	✔	✔
Episode 3 (Wednesday, 21 August)	3	Don Rogers	50	"Old Town Road"	—	—	—	—
Episode 3 (Wednesday, 21 August)	4	Brad Butcher	41	"I'm on Fire"	✔	✔	✔	✔
Episode 3 (Wednesday, 21 August)	5	Chonnie "Chufu" Fleming	51	"Born This Way"	—	—	—	—
Episode 3 (Wednesday, 21 August)	6	Yorke Heath	29	"How to Save a Life"	✔	—	✔	—
Episode 3 (Wednesday, 21 August)	7	Jenna Hudson	26	"Complicated"	✔	✔	✔	✔
Episode 4 (Sunday, 25 August)	1	Siena	18	"My Mind"	✔	✔	✔	✔
Episode 4 (Sunday, 25 August)	2	Matthew Hearne	24	"This Is the Moment"	✔	✔	✔	✘
Episode 4 (Sunday, 25 August)	3	Charlize	19	"Like It Like That"	—	—	—	—
Episode 4 (Sunday, 25 August)	4	Stephanie Milostic	19	"New Rules"	✘	✔	—	✔
Episode 4 (Sunday, 25 August)	5	Brittni Hayden	32	"Welcome to the Jungle"	—	—	—	—
Episode 4 (Sunday, 25 August)	6	Liz Player	20	"It Don't Mean a Thing"	—	—	✔	✔
Episode 4 (Sunday, 25 August)	7	Duncan Toombs	46	"Have a Little Faith in Me"	✔	✔	✔	✔
Episode 5 (Monday, 26 August)	1	Tom Leeming	29	"Somebody to Love"	✔	✔	✔	✔
Episode 5 (Monday, 26 August)	2	Cade Geiger	17	"Dumb Things"	—	—	—	—
Episode 5 (Monday, 26 August)	3	Amber Sindoni	22	"Anyone"	—	✔	✔	—
Episode 5 (Monday, 26 August)	4	Mol Turner	17	"Toxic"	—	—	✔	—
Episode 5 (Monday, 26 August)	5	Hannah Sands	30	"Snooze"	✔	✔	—	—
Episode 5 (Monday, 26 August)	6	Sheba	49	"Down Under"	—	—	—	—
Episode 5 (Monday, 26 August)	7	Jaydin Shingleton	24	"Tennessee Whiskey"	✔	✘	✔	✔
Episode 6 (Tuesday, 27 August)
Episode 6 (Tuesday, 27 August)	1	Kirra Rawlings	16	"Fading Like a Flower"	—	—	—	—
Episode 6 (Tuesday, 27 August)	2	Jaedyn Randell	22	"Big White Room"	✘	—	✔	✘
Episode 6 (Tuesday, 27 August)	3	Kade De Luca	17	"Feeling Good"	—	—	—	—
Episode 6 (Tuesday, 27 August)	4	Hannah Stow	29	"Wonderwall"	—	—	—	—
Episode 6 (Tuesday, 27 August)	5	Queency	33	"Sexual Healing"	—	—	—	✔
Episode 6 (Tuesday, 27 August)	6	Larissa Kovalchuk	55	"Ave Maria"	—	✔	—	✔
Episode 6 (Tuesday, 27 August)	7	Cody Gunton	23	"Whataya Want from Me"	✔	✔	✔	✔
Episode 6 (Tuesday, 27 August)	8	SKŸE	26	"What Was I Made For?"	✔	✔	✔	✔
Episode 7 (Sunday, 1 September)
Episode 7 (Sunday, 1 September)	1	Natalie Colavito	37	"Whole Lotta Love"	✔	✔	✔	—
Episode 7 (Sunday, 1 September)	2	Laura Glynn	29	"Vienna"	✔	✔	✔	—
Episode 7 (Sunday, 1 September)	3	Annie Jones	16	"Holding Out for a Hero"	✔	—	✔	✔
Episode 7 (Sunday, 1 September)	4	Hayden Ashton	29	"Drift Away"	—	—	—	—
Episode 7 (Sunday, 1 September)	5	MJ O'Doherty	36	"Zero Gravity"	✔	—	✔	—
Episode 7 (Sunday, 1 September)	6	Jessica Duchesne	30	"How Will I Know"	—	—	—	—
Episode 7 (Sunday, 1 September)	7	Roland Williams	32	"Angels Brought Me Here"	✔	✘	✘	—
Episode 8 (Monday, 2 September)
Episode 8 (Monday, 2 September)	1	Eden Borrie	19	"Life on Mars"	✔	✔	✔	✔
Episode 8 (Monday, 2 September)	2	Michael Hailey	27	"Yellow"	—	—	—	—
Episode 8 (Monday, 2 September)	3	Jayden Leslie	19	"Life Is a Highway"	—	—	—	—
Episode 8 (Monday, 2 September)	4	Isaac Lowe	21	"As Long as You Love Me"	—	—	—	—
Episode 8 (Monday, 2 September)	5	Kaitlyn Martin	17	"Over the Rainbow"	✔	—	✔	✔
Episode 8 (Monday, 2 September)	6	Atlas	28	"Your Body"	—	—	—	—
Episode 8 (Monday, 2 September)	7	Falon Moore	24	"Piece by Piece"	—	—	✔	—
Episode 8 (Monday, 2 September)	8	Ellesemble	18	"Freedom! '90"	—	—	—	—
Episode 8 (Monday, 2 September)	9	Tori Darke	33	"Stupid Boy"	✔	✔	✔	—
Episode 9 (Tuesday, 3 September)
Episode 9 (Tuesday, 3 September)	1	Aaron Hayward	29	"Arcade"	✘	✘	✘	✔
Episode 9 (Tuesday, 3 September)	2	Julia G	42	"The Great Gig in the Sky"	—	—	—	Team full
Episode 9 (Tuesday, 3 September)	3	Cookie Robinson	16	"Can't Fight the Moonlight"	—	✔	—	Team full
Episode 9 (Tuesday, 3 September)	4	Jay Hoy	26	"Someday, Someday"	—	—	—	Team full
Episode 9 (Tuesday, 3 September)	5	Paea Havilli	32	"Don't Stop Me Now"	✔	✔	✔	Team full
Episode 9 (Tuesday, 3 September)	6	Kaitlin Lawler	24	"Poker Face"	—	—	—	Team full
Episode 9 (Tuesday, 3 September)	7	Arthur Hull	19	"When I Was Your Man"	✔	✔	✔	Team full
Episode 10 (Sunday, 8 September)
Episode 10 (Sunday, 8 September)	1	Annaleese Fuda	27	"Into You"	Team full	✔	✔	Team full
Episode 10 (Sunday, 8 September)	2	Emma Duncan	18	"Lose You to Love Me"	Team full	—	—	Team full
Episode 10 (Sunday, 8 September)	3	Jonathan Bufalino	18	"Waiting on the World to Change"	Team full	—	—	Team full
Episode 10 (Sunday, 8 September)	4	Amy Potter	21	"Million Reasons"	Team full	—	—	Team full
Episode 10 (Sunday, 8 September)	5	Phoelix	N/A	"Down"	Team full	—	—	Team full
Episode 10 (Sunday, 8 September)	6	Nic Jayd	39	"You Can Call Me Al"	Team full	—	—	Team full
Episode 10 (Sunday, 8 September)	7	Letitia Butler	35	"Always Remember Us This Way"	Team full	✔	✔	Team full
Episode 10 (Sunday, 8 September)	8	Nethra Raman	21	"Bruises"	Team full	Team full	✔	Team full
Episode 10 (Sunday, 8 September)	9	Angie Nair	16	"Emotions"	Team full	Team full	—	Team full
Episode 10 (Sunday, 8 September)	10	Jaymee Lancaster	19	"Elastic Heart"	Team full	Team full	✔	Team full

== Battles ==
The battles aired from 15 through 29 September. Each coach forms duets from two artists on their team. Of the two artists, the coach declares one the winner of the battle. The winner moves on directly to the knockouts. The loser of the battle is either eliminated, "saved" by their coach, or "stolen" by another coach to move on to the knockouts.

Battles colour key
Artist won the Battle and advanced to the Knockouts
Artist lost the Battle, but was stolen by another coach, and, advanced to the Knockouts
Artist lost the Battle, but was saved by their coach, and, advanced to the Knockouts
Artist lost the Battle, but was later saved by another coach for a wildcard, and, advanced to the Knockouts
Artist lost the Battle and was eliminated
Artist withdrew

Season thirteen battle rounds
Episode	Coach	Order	Winner	Song	Loser	'Steal'/'Save' result			
Episode	Coach	Order	Winner	Song	Loser	Guy	LeAnn	Kate	Adam
Episode 11 (Sunday, 15 September 2024)	Kate	1	Jaymee Lancaster	"Pure Imagination"	Liz Player	—	—	—	—
Episode 11 (Sunday, 15 September 2024)	Adam	2	Annie Jones	"River"	Aaron Hayward	—	—	—	—
Episode 11 (Sunday, 15 September 2024)	LeAnn	3	Amber Sindoni	"Take Me to Church"	Natalie Colavito	—	—	—	—
Episode 11 (Sunday, 15 September 2024)	Guy	4	Shannen Wick	"I'm Outta Love"	Paea Havilli	—	—	—	—
Episode 11 (Sunday, 15 September 2024)	Guy	5	Beau Shearer	"Stick Season"	Kyle Wilson	—	—	—	—
Episode 11 (Sunday, 15 September 2024)	LeAnn	6	Cookie Robinson	"Vampire"	Annaleese Fuda	—	—	—	—
Episode 11 (Sunday, 15 September 2024)	Kate	7	Jaedyn Randell	"Bring Me to Life"	Mol Turner	—	—	—	—
Episode 11 (Sunday, 15 September 2024)	Guy	8	Roland Williams	"Lose Control"	Jaydin Shingleton	✔	✔	✔	✔
Episode 12 (Sunday, 22 September 2024)	LeAnn	1	Laura Glynn	"Say Something"	Michael & Violeta	Team full	—	✔	✔
Episode 12 (Sunday, 22 September 2024)	Adam	2	Siena	"Drivers License"	Kaitlyn Martin	Team full	—	Team full	—
Episode 12 (Sunday, 22 September 2024)	Guy	3	SKŸE	"Yesterday"	Eden Borrie	Team full	—	Team full	—
Episode 12 (Sunday, 22 September 2024)	Kate	4	Matthew Hearne	"You'll Never Walk Alone"	MJ O'Doherty	Team full	—	Team full	—
Episode 12 (Sunday, 22 September 2024)	Adam	5	Cody Gunton	"Zombie"	Teza McKenna	Team full	—	Team full	—
Episode 12 (Sunday, 22 September 2024)	Guy	6	Priscilla Stanley	"I Try"	Hannah Sands	Team full	—	Team full	—
Episode 12 (Sunday, 22 September 2024)	Kate	7	Yorke Heath	"The Only Exception"	Jenna Hudson	Team full	—	Team full	—
Episode 12 (Sunday, 22 September 2024)	LeAnn	8	Letitia Butler	"Don't Let the Sun Go Down on Me"	Duncan Toombs	Team full	✔	Team full	—
Episode 13 (Sunday, 29 September 2024)	LeAnn	1	Reuben De Melo	"Hallelujah"	Larissa Kovalchuk	Team full	Team full	Team full	—
Episode 13 (Sunday, 29 September 2024)	Adam	2	Chloe Kay	"Chain of Fools"	Queency	Team full	Team full	Team full	—
Episode 13 (Sunday, 29 September 2024)	Kate	3	Elias Lanyon	"Fields of Gold"	Tia Barnes	Team full	Team full	Team full	—
Episode 13 (Sunday, 29 September 2024)	Adam	4	Lana Sayah	"Bennie and the Jets"	Tom Leeming	Team full	Team full	Team full	—
Episode 13 (Sunday, 29 September 2024)	Adam	5	Stephanie Milostic	"Yes, And?"	Ruby Lafferty	Team full	Team full	Team full	—
Episode 13 (Sunday, 29 September 2024)	Kate	6	Nethra Raman	"True Colors"	Falon Moore	Team full	Team full	Team full	—
Episode 13 (Sunday, 29 September 2024)	Guy	7	James Vass	"You Broke Me First"	Arthur Hull	Team full	Team full	Team full	✔
Episode 13 (Sunday, 29 September 2024)	LeAnn	8	Brad Butcher*	"Please Forgive Me"	N/A	Team full	Team full	Team full	Team full
Episode 13 (Sunday, 29 September 2024)	LeAnn	8	Tori Darke*	"Please Forgive Me"	N/A	Team full	Team full	Team full	Team full

- Matthew Hearne originally won his battle, but withdrew from the show following the conclusion of the battles.
- LeAnn could not decide on a winner between Brad and Tori. With approval from the producers, she suggested they become a duo, and both artists agreed.

== Knockouts ==
The knockouts aired on 6 & 13 October. The remaining seven artists on each team sing for three spots on their respective team. The three winners per team move on to the showdowns, while the other four artists are eliminated. Teams Adam and Kate performed on the first night, while Teams Guy and LeAnn performed on the second night.

Knockouts colour key
Artist won the Knockout and advanced to the Showdowns
Artist lost the Knockout and was eliminated

Knockouts results
Episode	Order	Coach	Theme	Song	Winner	Losers	Songs
Episode 14 (Sunday, 6 October 2024)	1	Adam	Tina Turner	"River Deep – Mountain High"	Annie Jones	Chloe Kay	"Proud Mary"
Episode 14 (Sunday, 6 October 2024)	1	Adam	Tina Turner	"River Deep – Mountain High"	Annie Jones	Lana Sayah	"What's Love Got to Do with It"
Episode 14 (Sunday, 6 October 2024)	2	Kate	Australian singer-songwriters	"Titanium"	Jaedyn Randell	Elias Lanyon	"Brother"
Episode 14 (Sunday, 6 October 2024)	3	Adam	Kylie Minogue	"In Your Eyes"	Siena	Stephanie Milostic	"Padam Padam"
Episode 14 (Sunday, 6 October 2024)	4	Adam	Flipped Songs	"Stay"	Arthur Hull	Cody Gunton	"I Wanna Dance with Somebody (Who Loves Me)"
Episode 14 (Sunday, 6 October 2024)	5	Kate	Storytellers	"Issues"	Jaymee Lancaster	Yorke Heath	"Breakeven"
Episode 14 (Sunday, 6 October 2024)	5	Kate	Storytellers	"Issues"	Jaymee Lancaster	Nethra Raman	"Scars to Your Beautiful"
Episode 14 (Sunday, 6 October 2024)	6	Kate	Billie Eilish	"I Love You"	Tom Leeming	Michael & Violeta	"No Time to Die"
Episode 15 (Sunday, 13 October 2024)	1	LeAnn	Rookies	"(You Make Me Feel Like) A Natural Woman"	Letitia Butler	N/A	
Episode 15 (Sunday, 13 October 2024)	1	LeAnn	Rookies	"The Chain"	Brad & Tori	N/A	
Episode 15 (Sunday, 13 October 2024)	2	LeAnn	Young girl voices	N/A		Amber Sindoni	"We Found Love"
Episode 15 (Sunday, 13 October 2024)	2	LeAnn	Young girl voices	N/A		Cookie Robinson	"Flowers"
Episode 15 (Sunday, 13 October 2024)	3	LeAnn	Emotional singers	"Use Somebody"	Reuben De Melo	Duncan Toombs	"Human"
Episode 15 (Sunday, 13 October 2024)	3	LeAnn	Emotional singers	"Use Somebody"	Reuben De Melo	Laura Glynn	"Perfect"
Episode 15 (Sunday, 13 October 2024)	4	Guy	Secret singers	"The Climb"	SKŸE	James Vass	"Golden Hour"
Episode 15 (Sunday, 13 October 2024)	5	Guy	Country artists	"Fire and Rain"	Jaydin Shingleton	Beau Shearer	"Wake Me Up"
Episode 15 (Sunday, 13 October 2024)	6	Guy	Vocal Powerhouses	"Angel of Mine"	Roland Williams	Priscilla Stanley	"This Kiss"
Episode 15 (Sunday, 13 October 2024)	6	Guy	Vocal Powerhouses	"Angel of Mine"	Roland Williams	Shannen Wick	"Always Be My Baby"

=== Showdowns ===
In the Showdowns, coaches pick two of their three Knockout winners to go straight through the Semifinals.

Showdowns colour key
Artist won the Showdown and advanced to the Semifinals
Artist lost the Showdown and was eliminated

Showdown results
Episode	Order	Coach	Song	Winner(s)	Loser(s)	Song
Episode 14 (Sunday, 6 October 2024)	1	Adam	"A Song for You"	Siena	Arthur Hull	"Rocket Man"
Episode 14 (Sunday, 6 October 2024)	1	Adam	"Mamma Knows Best"	Annie Jones	Arthur Hull	"Rocket Man"
Episode 14 (Sunday, 6 October 2024)	2	Kate	"Mirror"	Jaedyn Randell	Jaymee Lancaster	"Figures"
Episode 14 (Sunday, 6 October 2024)	2	Kate	"Another Love"	Tom Leeming	Jaymee Lancaster	"Figures"
Episode 15 (Sunday, 13 October 2024)	1	LeAnn	"The Best"	Letitia Butler	Brad Butcher*	"I Remember Everything"
Episode 15 (Sunday, 13 October 2024)	1	LeAnn	"Don't You Worry Child"	Reuben De Melo	Tori Darke*	"Before He Cheats"
Episode 15 (Sunday, 13 October 2024)	2	Guy	"I Won't Give Up"	Jaydin Shingleton	Roland Williams	"Superstition"
Episode 15 (Sunday, 13 October 2024)	2	Guy	"Anyone"	SKŸE	Roland Williams	"Superstition"

- In the Showdowns, Brad and Tori didn't have enough time to rehearse a new song, so they performed individual songs instead while still competed as a duo.

== Finals ==
=== Semi-final ===
The Semifinal aired on 20 October. The 8 remaining artists sing different songs for a place in the Grand Final. At the end of the episode, coaches are only allowed to pick one artist from their team to advance to the Grand Final.

Semi-final results
Order	Coach	Contestant	Song	Result
1	Kate	Jaedyn Randell	"Wide Awake"	Saved by coach
2	Guy	SKŸE	"Both Sides, Now"	Saved by coach
3	LeAnn	Letitia Butler	"Son of a Preacher Man"	Eliminated
4	Adam	Annie Jones	"Love Is a Battlefield"	Saved by coach
5	Kate	Tom Leeming	"Somebody That I Used to Know"	Eliminated
6	Guy	Jaydin Shingleton	"Beautiful Things"	Eliminated
7	Adam	Siena	"Jealous"	Eliminated
8	LeAnn	Reuben De Melo	"Wicked Game"	Saved by coach

=== Grand Finale ===
The Grand Finale was broadcast on 27 October 2024. Each artist performed a solo song and a duet with their coach. Similar to the last four seasons, this was the only episode of the season where the results were determined by public vote and not by the coaches. Reuben De Melo was declared the winner, marking LeAnn Rimes' first win as a coach. Rimes became the fourth coach on the Australian version on The Voice to win on their debut season.

Finale results
Coach	Contestant	Order	Solo song	Order	Duet song	Result
LeAnn Rimes	Reuben De Melo	5	"The House of the Rising Sun"	1	"Fix You"	Winner
Guy Sebastian	SKŸE	2	"Iris"	6	"Against All Odds (Take a Look at Me Now)"	3rd Place
Adam Lambert	Annie Jones	3	"Youngblood"	7	"Barracuda"	4th Place
Kate Miller-Heidke	Jaedyn Randell	8	"Snow Angel"	4	"Walking on a Dream"	Runner-Up

== Contestants who appeared on previous seasons or TV shows ==
- Siena, who competed with her full name, Siena Fodera, appeared in the eighth season under Team Boy George, and was eliminated in the knockouts.
- Annaleese Fuda appeared in the fourth season, but did not receive a chair turn.
- SKŸE, who competed with his real name, Nicolas Duquemin, appeared in the fourth season under Team Delta, and was eliminated in the live shows.
- Annie Jones was a quarterfinalist on the fifteenth season of America's Got Talent.
- Natalie Colavito was a semifinalist in season 6 of Australian Idol.
- MJ O'Doherty represented Armenia in the Eurovision Song Contest 2015 in the supergroup Genealogy.
- Tori Darke appeared in the tenth season, but did not receive a chair turn.
- Arthur Hull appeared in the eleventh season, but did not receive a chair turn.

== Ratings ==
Colour key:

– Highest rating during the season
– Lowest rating during the season

The Voice season thirteen National viewership and nightly position
Episode		Original airdate	Timeslot	National Viewers	Night Rank	Source
1	"Blind Auditions"	19 August 2024	Monday 7:30 pm	977,000	4	
2	"Blind Auditions"	20 August 2024	Tuesday 7:30 pm	901,000	4	
3	"Blind Auditions"	21 August 2024	Wednesday 7:30 pm	917,000	3	
4	"Blind Auditions"	25 August 2024	Sunday 7:00 pm	1,049,000	1	
5	"Blind Auditions"	26 August 2024	Monday 7:30 pm	1,043,000	3	
6	"Blind Auditions"	27 August 2024	Tuesday 7:30 pm	1,054,000	4	
7	"Blind Auditions"	1 September 2024	Sunday 7:00 pm	1,039,000	3	
8	"Blind Auditions"	2 September 2024	Monday 7:30 pm	986,000	5	
9	"Blind Auditions"	3 September 2024	Tuesday 7:30 pm	965,000	4	
10	"Blind Auditions"	8 September 2024	Sunday 7:00 pm	1,053,000	3	
11	"Battles"	15 September 2024	Sunday 7:00 pm	1,002,000	3	
12	"Battles"	22 September 2024	Sunday 7:00 pm	1,020,000	3	
13	"Battles"	29 September 2024	Sunday 7:00 pm	1,054,000	2	
14	"Knockouts"	6 October 2024	Sunday 7:00 pm	675,000	6	
15	"Knockouts"	13 October 2024	Sunday 7:00 pm	984,000	4	
16	"Semi Finals"	20 October 2024	Sunday 7:00 pm	922,000	2	
17	"Grand Final"	27 October 2024	Sunday 7:00 pm	1,081,000	2	
