= Brad Butcher =

Australian country singer-songwriter

- Born: Mackay, Queensland Australia
- Genre: Country
- Occupation: Singer-songwriter
- Instrument: Vocals
- Years active: 2012 −present
- Website: bradbutcher.com

Brad Butcher is an Australian country singer-songwriter. As of 2022, Butcher has released four studio albums and has won two golden guitars at the Country Music Awards of Australia.

== Career ==
In 2012, Butcher released his self-titled debut album, which earned him nominations for a range of Australian and international songwriting awards, as well as supports and guest appearances alongside Busby Marou, Bill Chambers, Mark Seymour and Pete Murray. In 2013, Butcher was an APRA Professional Development Award finalist.

In April 2015, Butcher released his second studio album, Jamestown. He began writing for it in 2012 and chose 11 songs from the 50 he'd written. Butcher said "I really feel like this album is my album. I've worked very hard. Everything down to the artistry and where it was produced and mixed was all my decision."

In August 2017, Butcher released his third studio album, From the Bottom of a Well, which was recorded at Sydney's Love Hz Studio. In January 2018, Butcher won Best New Talent at the CMAA for "Well Dressed Man".

In July 2019, Butcher released his fourth studio album, Travelling Salesman. The album, produced by Matt Fell, debuted at number 3 on the ARIA Country Albums chart. Music critic Bernard Zuel said "It's a fourth album with a lot to be proud of".

In December 2021, it was confirmed that Butcher had signed with Ambition Records. He released his first compilation album Storyteller: The Journey So Far in January 2022. The album debuted at number 18 on the ARIA Country Albums chart.

In June 2023, Butcher announced the release of his sixth studio album, East of Everything, scheduled for release on 22 September 2023.

In 2024, Butcher auditioned for the thirteenth series of The Voice Australia. All four coaches turned their chairs, expressing interest in working with him. Ultimately, he chose to be on LeAnn Rimes' team. Butcher won the battle round, but Rimes opted to take him through as a duo with challenger Tori Darke. The duo advanced to the Knockouts where they did not reach the semi-final.

== Discography ==
=== Studio albums ===
List of studio albums
Title	Details
Brad Butcher	Released: 2012; Label: Brad Butcher, Checked Label; Format: CD, Digital download
Jamestown	Released: April 2015; Label: Brad Butcher, Checked Label; Format: CD, Digital download
From the Bottom of a Well	Released: August 2017; Label: Brad Butcher; Format: CD, Digital download
Travelling Salesman	Released: July 2019; Label: Brad Butcher, Millstream Music; Format: CD, Digital download
East of Everything	Scheduled: 22 September 2023; Label: Brad Butcher; Format: CD, Digital download

=== Compilation albums ===
List of compilation albums
Title	Details
Storyteller: The Journey So Far	Released: 14 January 2022; Label: Brad Butcher, Ambition (AMBITION141); Format: CD, Digital download

== Awards and nominations ==
=== Country Music Awards of Australia ===
The Country Music Awards of Australia is an annual awards night held in January during the Tamworth Country Music Festival. Celebrating recording excellence in the Australian country music industry. They commenced in 1973.

Year	Nominee / work	Award	Result	Ref.
2018	Brad Butcher ("Well Dressed Man")	New talent of the Year	Won	
2018	Brad Butcher	Male Artist of the Year	Nominated	
2018	From the Bottom of a Well	Alternative Country Album of the Year	Nominated	
2020	Brad Butcher	Male Artist of the Year	Nominated	
2020	Travelling Salesman	Alternative Country Album of the Year	Won	
2020	"Freshwater Lady" (Brad Butcher & Vaughan Jones)	Heritage Song of the Year	Nominated	
2024	East of Everything	Alternative Country Album of the Year	Pending	

=== Queensland Music Awards ===
The Queensland Music Awards (previously known as Q Song Awards) are annual awards celebrating Queensland, Australia's brightest emerging artists and established legends. They commenced in 2006.

Year	Nominee / work	Award	Result (wins only)
2018	"Well Dressed Man"	Country Song of the Year	Won
