= Tweedie Waititi =

New Zealand director

- Born: 1985 or 1986 (age 40–41); Waihau Bay, Raukokore, Bay of Plenty, New Zealand
- Occupations: Film producer, director, writer

Mateheke "Tweedie" Waititi (born 1985 or 1986) is a New Zealand film director and producer. The whāngai sister of Taika Waititi, she is best known for her work co-directing production company Matewa Media, which since 2016 has produced Māori language versions of Disney animated films.

== Early life and education ==
Mateheke Waititi, known as "Tweedie", was born on 1985 or 1986. She grew up in the Te Whānau-ā-Apanui community of Waihau Bay in the Bay of Plenty. She is the first cousin of Taika Waititi, but as they were raised together through whāngai adoption, they consider each other siblings.

Waititi studied film at the South Seas Film & Television School.

== Career ==
In 2012, she worked as a language coach for the Rachel House-directed production of William Shakespeare's Troilus and Cressida, performed in Māori.

In 2017, Waititi formed the production company Matewa Media alongside filmmaker (and then wife of Taika Waititi) Chelsea Winstanley. The company was named for Waititi's grandmother Matewa Delamere (1926–1998). Waititi and Winstanley were inspired to create Māori language adaptations of Disney films while watching Waititi's toddlers watch Moana on repeat, and hoping that they would be able to experience the film in Māori. Taika Waititi, who had worked on an early draft of the English language version of the film, proposed the idea to Disney, who agreed and allowed Matewa Media to start work on the film. Moana Reo Māori was released in 2017, coinciding with Te Wiki o te Reo Māori (Māori Language Week) 2017. Waititi also translated the subtitles for her cousin's film Thor: Ragnarok into Māori, for the home media and aircraft release of the film.

In 2020, Waititi worked as co-producer and a script consultant on the LGBT series and accompanying feature film Rūrangi, to help develop authentic Māori storylines for the production.. The series went on to win an International Emmy for best short-form series. Waititi won the Department of Post Best New Zealand Film at the Show Me Shorts film festival in 2020, for producing the short film Daddy's Girl (Kōtiro). The following year, she translated the song "Bathe in the River" (2006) by Hollie Smith into Māori, as a part of the Waiata / Anthems project.

In 2022, Waititi produced two Māori language adaptations of Disney films: The Lion King (originally released 1994), released during Matariki, and Frozen (originally released 2013), released in 2022.

Waititi directed and produced the Māori version of Moana 2, which uses the Tairāwhiti dialect. When it is released on 27 November 2024, it will be the first time ever that a Disney film is released in an Indigenous language at the same time as its English-language release.

== Dialects ==
Waititi represents a range of Māori dialects in her adaptations. For The Lion King, different animals were represented with Waikato Tainui and Ngāi Tūhoe dialects. For Frozen, Waititi chose to represent southern Ngāi Tahu dialects, to match the snowy atmosphere of the film.

== Filmography ==
Year	Title	Director	Writer	Producer	Notes
2017	Moana Reo Māori	Yes	Yes	Yes	
2019	Ways to See	No	No	Yes	Short film
2019	Daddy's Girl (Kōtiro)	No	No	Yes	Short film
2020	Rūrangi	No	Yes	Yes	Co-Producer, Script Consultant
2022	The Lion King Reo Māori	Yes	Yes	Yes	
2022	Frozen Reo Māori	Yes	Yes	Yes	
2024	Moana 2 Reo Māori	Yes	Yes	Yes	
