= Twenty Ten (album) =

Compilation album by Guy Sebastian
- Released: 19 November 2010
- Recorded: 2003–2010
- Genres: Pop, R&B, soul
- Label: Sony Music
- Producers: Adam Reily, Anders Bagge, Beau Dozzier, Bryon Jones, Andre Harris, David Ryan Harris, Fredrik Odesjo, Guy Sebastian, James Roche, Jarrad Rogers, John Foreman, Jörgen Elofsson, Peer Åström, Phil Turcio, Projay, Steve Cropper, Stuart Crichton

Guy Sebastian chronology
Like It Like That (2009)	Twenty Ten (2010)	Armageddon (2012)

Singles from Twenty Ten
- 1. "Who's That Girl" Released: 5 November 2010

Twenty Ten is a two-disc retrospective album by Australian singer and songwriter Guy Sebastian. Disc one contains 18 songs from his previous five albums and two new songs, including the lead single "Who's That Girl" which features American rapper Eve. Disc two has acoustic versions of ten of the songs. The album was released in Australia on 19 November 2010 and reached number four on the ARIA Album Chart, Sebastian's sixth consecutive top ten album. It was the fifth highest selling Australian artist album of 2010, and reached 2× platinum certification. Twenty Ten was also certified gold in New Zealand.

"Who's That Girl" was the only single released from Twenty Ten. It reached number one on the ARIA Singles Chart, Sebastian's fifth of six number one singles in Australia. It achieved 6× platinum certification in 2023. It won the Highest Selling Single ARIA Award in 2011, and received nominations for Single of the Year and Best Pop Release. Sebastian was also nominated as Most Popular Australian Artist. "Who's That Girl" also reached number one and 2× platinum certification in New Zealand.

== Background ==
While Sebastian's recording career has been relatively short, prior to this album he had released five top ten albums which produced ten top fifty singles. Nine of these singles peaked inside the top 15 of the ARIA singles charts, with six reaching the top ten including four number ones. The earliest indication that he would be releasing a retrospective album came in October 2010 when it was revealed he had recorded a new single titled "Who's That Girl". The artwork of the album was revealed shortly after, along with the official track listing.

Sebastian said in an interview with the Daily Telegraph, "It's weird to have a best of, I've only been doing this for seven or eight years. I guess it's one of those things, the record company contract finishes and they've got that in their artillery." In the EPK for the release Sebastian said, "We put together more of a compilation that was packaged in a way that was different. I put 20 of the songs on and then got ten of them and did totally different versions. It gives the fans something else, and takes them back too through that journey" As Sebastian has recorded songs in a variety of genres on his five previous albums, the songs on Twenty Ten range from pop, pop rock, funk, R&B, jazz, gospel through to soul. He said "I have a really eclectic taste in music, so in the best of there are so many styles". The release of Twenty Ten completed Sebastian's original contract he signed when he first won Australian Idol in 2003. In November 2010 he was re-signed by Sony Music for another long-term contract.

== Music ==
=== Disc one ===
All of Sebastian's released singles were included on the first disc, and also some of his favourite album tracks, and two new songs. The lead single "Who's That Girl" featuring Eve is a dance flavoured electro R&B song, a change in style for Sebastian. The second new song is the soul ballad "If I Really Loved you". The three songs from Sebastian's 6× platinum debut album Just As I Am included on the album are "Angels Brought Me Here", "All I Need Is You" and album track "My Beautiful Friend". "Angels Brought Me Here" was Sebastian's debut song after winning the inaugural Australian Idol competition in 2003. It reached number one the ARIA Singles Chart, and was eventually certified 5× platinum. It was the highest selling song in Australia in 2003, and in 2010 ARIA announced it was the highest selling song of the 2000 to 2009 decade. Sebastian said, "The success of the song still hasn't sunk in after 7 years. [...] I love the song, will never tire of it, and I love that my country has enabled me to keep doing what I do." Up until 2011 "Angels Brought Me Here" had the highest recorded sales for an Australian artist single in chart history. "All I Need Is You" is a pop song written by Sebastian before he entered Australian Idol, which also reached number one and achieved platinum certification. "Climb Every Mountain" was performed by Sebastian during the Idol competition. When Idol's musical director John Foreman left the show in 2009 he named it as one of his favourite moments during his six years on Idol. Sebastian recorded the song with the Sydney International Orchestra and it was included as a "B" side on "All I Need Is You".

Sebastian's second album Beautiful Life was prodomiently R&B, with many of the songs co-written with American writers. "Out with My Baby", "Kryptonite" and "Oh Oh" are the songs included on Twenty Ten. "Out with My Baby", co-written with Robin Thicke, is an uptempo funk R&B song which became Sebastian's third number one single and was certified platinum. "Oh Oh" is also funk R&B, while Kryptonite is an R&B ballad. His third album Closer to the Sun was a mix of a number of different genres including pop rock, R&B, jazz and soul, and was co-written mainly with Australian songwriters. The tracks included on Twenty Ten are the gospel tinged ballad "Taller, Stronger, Better", the pop-rock "Elevator Love", the R&B balad "Cover on My Heart" and the album title track "Closer to the Sun". In 2007 Sebastian travelled to Memphis, Tennessee to record a tribute album of Memphis soul classics with Steve Cropper and other members of American soul band The MGs at Ardent Studios. The MGs also came to Australia in early 2008 to be his backing band for his National tour. Although no singles were released from The Memphis Album it achieved double platinum certification. Sebastian has included two of the tracks on Twenty Ten, "Hold On, I'm Comin'" and "Take Me to the River".

Like it Like That, Sebastian's fifth album, was an original modern soul album which showed the influences of his Memphis soul phase. John Mayer's band members including David Ryan Harris were the musicians on some of the songs, and John Mayer himself played guitar and sang background vocals on three of the tracks. Five of the songs from this album are included on the retrospective album. "Like it Like That", a soul infused track with a surf-pop feel became Sebastian's fourth number one single and was the highest selling Australian Artist song in 2009, eventually reaching 5× platinum certification. Sebastian said of the song, "I think "Like It Like That" is the most I've ever sat back and gone 'I can't believe this is my life. I can't believe it's happening and radio's all over it.' It blew my mind." "Art of Love", a R&B ballad featuring Jordin Sparks, was a top 10 double platinum certified single. The other three songs from Like It Like That are "All to Myself", "Never Hold You Down" and "Attention".

=== Disc two ===
Sebastian co-produced the acoustic tracks on the second disc with his longtime guitarist friend Carl Dimatago. Sebastian stated, "People can make their own albums with digital downloads by just dragging their choice of songs into their music folder, so I think artists have to be much more creative in terms of how they put together these kind of albums. Since a lot of my fans already have my songs, I wanted to be able to offer up something completely new within the package. I recorded ten of the songs acoustically, which is something I always wanted to do, and I did it in such a way that I wanted to breathe new life into the songs by changing the arrangements around." Sebastian's self-confessed eclectic taste in music is evident throughout the acoustic songs. For example, "Elevator Love", originally a pop/rock track, now has a reggae lilt, and the once effervescent pop "All I Need Is You" becomes a slowed down soul ballad. There are jazz influences evident in several tracks including Sebastian scatting in "Oh Oh".

== Release and promotion ==
"Who's That Girl" was serviced to Australian radio stations on 5 November 2010 and was the most added song in its second week. It peaked at number 13 in national radio airplay. Eve came to Australia to film the music video with Sebastian, and they performed the song on the grand final of the Seven Network's The X Factor on 22 November 2010, which was televised in Australia and New Zealand. During December 2010 and January 2011 "Who's That Girl" was used by the Seven Network to promote the new season of Desperate Housewives. After The X Factor finished Sebastian made a short promotional trip to Auckland, New Zealand, for an instore appearance and media interviews. On his return to Australia he performed on the Hamish and Andy Thank You Tour in Sydney in early December.

Sebastian also performed at a private event to welcome Oprah Winfrey to Sydney during her trip to Australia. During the special Oprah! The Interview which screened on Network Ten on 14 December, Winfrey was shown in the front row of the audience while Sebastian was singing "Who's That Girl". Sebastian sang for Winfrey a second time when she requested he perform at her private crew wrap up party before she left Australia. Although no footage appeared of that performance it was reported in the media at the time. It was also reported Winfrey wanted Sebastian to appear on The Oprah Winfrey Show in January 2011 but scheduling difficulties had prevented it. An article with a comprehensive interview with him is featured on the official Oprah site.

On Australia Day 2011, Sebastian performed "Who's That Girl" during Channel Nine's Today at Suncorp Stadium in Brisbane, and was the headline act at the AusSounds Australia Day Concert at the Brisbane Convention and Exhibition Centre. In March and April he was the support act for Lionel Richie's tour of Australia and New Zealand. He spent the next few months in the US, returning to Australia for The X Factor. On the first live show in September Sebastian sang "Who's That Girl" as part of a judge's medley. In November 2011, Sebastian performed at the ARIA Awards for the second year in succession, where he sang a medley of "Who's That Girl" and his most recent single "Don't Worry Be Happy".

== Singles ==
"Who's That Girl" was released on 5 November 2010 and was Twenty Ten's only single in Australia. It reached number one on the ARIA Singles Chart, Sebastian's fifth of six number one singles in Australia. It was the second highest selling Australian artist single in 2010, and the fifth highest selling one in 2011. It won the Highest Selling Single ARIA Award in 2011 and achieved 6× platinum certification in 2023. "Who's That Girl" also reached number one and 2× platinum certification in New Zealand, his second number one single there.

"Like It Like That" was released to radio in New Zealand as Twenty Ten's second single there in early 2011, and peaked at number 30 on the New Zealand Singles Chart and achieved gold certification.

== Critical reception ==
The album received positive reviews. Jamie Horne, a music reviewer with The Border Mail said, "The inaugural winner's longevity (he has released five albums) can be attributed to the fact that he's an accomplished musician and songwriter [...] A 10-track acoustic disc with the hits reworked (check the swinging take of Like It Like That) and a couple of newies including the dancefloor-ready Who's That Girl with US rapper Eve should make it clear that the former 'Fro' is not that uncool after all". David Lim, a music journalist and announcer on radio station Joy 94.9 wrote when reporting on the album's chart debut, "Twenty Ten – debuts at #9. Still not good enough. Take my word for it, the acoustic disc is totally worth emptying your coin purse for". Chris Havercroft from X-Press Magazine said, "He dabbles in throwaway pop with Elevator Love and shows off his Memphis chops with Hold on I'm Coming. It is the dancefloor where Sebastian does his most damage and when teaming up with rapper Eve for new single 'Who's That Girl' he shows his knack for targeting his audience. Love him or loathe him, upon listening to Twenty Ten it's hard to deny that Sebastian has quite the set of pipes on him". The Daily Telegraph music editor Kathy McCabe wrote, "Sebastian has matured into a genuine hitmaker, his gift with melody so finely-honed he can pretty much punch out a catchy number in his sleep." AllMusic reviewer Jon O'brien said, "it's a testament to his vocal abilities and songwriting skills that, unlike many of his fellow winners, he's remained popular enough to see out his rather ambitious Sony contract, scoring five number ones since his victory in 2003. This comprehensive two-disc, 30-track collection, which reveals a subtle and natural progression with each album, explains why he's managed to survive once the show's publicity machine died down."

=== Accolades ===
"Who's That Girl" and "All to Myself" were shortlisted for the 2011 APRA Song of the Year, with "Art of Love" shortlisted the previous year. "Who's That Girl" won the 2011 APRA Award for Urban Work of the Year and received peer voted ARIA Music Award nominations for Single of the Year and Best Pop Release.

== Commercial performance ==
Twenty Ten was released on 19 November 2010 and debuted on the ARIA Albums Chart at number nine, and reached a peak of number four in its seventh week. It spent 18 weeks in the ARIA top 50, including 12 weeks in the top ten. It became the fifth highest selling Australian artist album in Australia in 2010 within six weeks of release and achieved 2× platinum certification in 2014. Twenty Ten also reached No. 24 on the New Zealand Albums Chart.

== Track listing ==
Disc one
No.	Title	Writer(s)	Length
1.	"Who's That Girl" (featuring Eve)	Guy Sebastian, Eve	3:40
2.	"If I Really Loved You"	Guy Sebastian, Andre Harris, Carl Dimitaga	4:43
3.	"Like It Like That" (radio edit)	Guy Sebastian, David Ryan Harris, Sean Hurley	3:49
4.	"All to Myself" (radio mix)	Guy Sebastian, Carl Dimataga	3:43
5.	"All I Need Is You"	Guy Sebastian, Adam Reily, Alun Firth	4:05
6.	"Angels Brought Me Here"	Jörgen Elofsson, John Reid	4:00
7.	"Out with My Baby"	Guy Sebastian, Robin Thicke, James Gass	3:39
8.	"Oh Oh"	Guy Sebastian, Jarrad Rogers	3:06
9.	"Taller, Stronger, Better" (radio mix)	Guy Sebastian, Gary Pinto, Phil Turcio	3:24
10.	"Cover on My Heart" (radio mix)	Guy Sebastian, Peer Åström, Anders Bagge	3:59
11.	"Closer to the Sun"	Guy Sebastian, Gary Pinto, Carl Dimataga	3:53
12.	"Elevator Love"	Guy Sebastian, Jarrad Rogers	4:11
13.	"Art of Love" (featuring Jordin Sparks)	Guy Sebastian, Adam Reily	4:00
14.	"Attention"	Guy Sebastian, Fredrik Odesjo	3:28
15.	"Hold On, I'm Comin'"	Isaac Hayes, David Porter	3:16
16.	"Climb Every Mountain"	Oscar Hammerstein, Richard Rodgers	2:57
17.	"Kryptonite" (radio edit)	Guy Sebastian, Beau Dozier	4:00
18.	"Never Hold You Down"	Guy Sebastian, David Ryan Harris	3:20
19.	"My Beautiful Friend"	Adam Reily	5:06
20.	"Take Me to the River"	Mabon Hodges, Al Green	5:30

Disc two (acoustic versions)
No.	Title	Length
1.	"All to Myself"	4:04
2.	"Elevator Love"	4:05
3.	"Like It Like That"	3:32
4.	"Art of Love"	4:18
5.	"Closer to the Sun"	4:14
6.	"Kryptonite"	4:43
7.	"Angels Brought Me Here"	3:55
8.	"All I Need is You"	5:59
9.	"Out with My Baby"	3:32
10.	"Oh Oh"	3:14

Indonesian disc two (bonus track)
No.	Title	Length
11.	"Who's That Girl" (featuring Cinta Laura)	3:41

== Personnel ==
Credits are adapted from album liner notes.

Disc one

- Lead vocals (all tracks) – Guy Sebastian

"Who's That Girl"

- Featured rap – Eve
- Production – Guy Sebastian, Andre Harris

"If I Really Loved You"

- Background vocals – Guy Sebastian
- Production – Adre Harris

"Like It Like That" (Radio edit)

- Background vocals – David Ryan Harris, CC White
- Guitar – Joshua Lopez,
- Bass – Sean Hurley
- Farlisa organ and piano – Zac Rae
- Drums – JJ Johnson
- Trumpet – Jumaane Smith
- Tenor saxophone – Bob Reynolds
- Baritone saxophone – David Moyer
- Production – David Ryan Harris, Fredrik Odesjo, Andreas Levander
- Engineering – Billy Bush
- Mixing – Fredrik Odesjo, Rob Kinelski

"All to Myself" (Radio mix)

- Background vocals – David Ryan Harris, Angel Taylor
- Guitar – John Mayer, Joshua Lopez, Michael Chaves
- Bass – Sean Hurley
- Piano, B3 organ, clavinet – Zac Rae
- Trumpet – Jumaane Smith
- Tenor saxophone – Bob Reynolds
- Baritone saxophone – David Moyer
- Drums, tambourine – JJ Johnson
- Mellotron, glockenspiel – David Ryan Harris
- Instrumental arrangements – Fredrik Odesjo, Andreas Levander, Guy Sebastian
- Production – David Ryan Harris, Fredrik Odesjo, Andreas Levander
- Engineering – Billy Bush
- Mixing – Rob Kinelski

"All I Need Is You"

- Background vocals – Guy Sebastian
- Guitars – Peter Northcote
- Bass – Alex Hewetson
- Production – Bryon Jones, Adam Reily
- Programming – Ramish Sathiah, Adam Reily
- Mixing – Craig Porteils

"Angels Brought Me Here"

- Background vocals – Guy Sebastian
- Guitars – Peter Northgate
- String arrangements – Bruce Heald
- Production – Bryon Jones, Adam Reily
- Engineering – Craig Porteils
- Programming – Adam Reily
- Mixing – Steve MacMillan

"Out with My Baby"

- Background vocals and vocal arrangements – Guy Sebastian
- All instrumentation – Projay
- Production – Robin Thicke, Projay
- Engineering – Projay
- Mixing – Dave Pensado

"Oh Oh"

- Background vocals and vocal arrangements – Guy Sebastian
- Saxophone – Brad Evens
- Other instrumentation and programming – Jarrad Rogers
- Production, engineering – Jarrad Rogers
- Mixing – Jon Gass

"Taller, Stronger, Better" (Radio mix)

- Vocals – Guy Sebastian
- Background vocals – Guy Sebastian, Gary Pinto, Susie Ahern
- Vocal production and arrangement – Guy Sebastian, Gary Pinto
- Vocal engineering – Carl J Shubert
- Production, programming and arrangements – Phil Turcio
- Guitars – Simon Hosford
- Orchestra – Victorian Philharmonic Orchestra
- Orchestral arrangement – Phil Turcio, Chong Lim
- Conductor – Chong Lim
- Orchestral engineering – Robin Gray
- Mixing – Ross Cockle

"Cover on My Heart" (Radio mix)

- Background vocals – Guy Sebastian
- Vocal arrangement and engineering – Peer Astrom, Anders Bagge
- Additional vocal engineering – Carl J Shubert
- Guitars – Sebastian Nylund
- Orchestra – Victorian Philharmonic Orchestra
- String arrangement, Conducting – Chong Lim
- Orchestral engineering – Robin Gray
- Other instrumentation and programming – Peer Astrom, Anders Bagge
- Production – Peer Astrom, Anders Bagge

"Closer to the Sun"

- Background vocals – Guy Sebastian
- Guitars – Jack Jones, Carl Dimataga
- Production – James Roche, Guy Sebastian
- Mixing – James Roche

"Elevator Love"

- Background vocals – Guy Sebastian
- Guitar – David Carr
- Drums – Damien Rogers
- Production and engineering – Jarrad Rogers
- Mixing – Mark Needham, Will Brierre

"Art of Love"

- Featured vocals – Jordin Sparks
- Piano, keyboards – Adam Reily
- Beats, bass and programming – Stuart Critchton
- Production – Stuart Critchton, Adam Reily, Guy Sebastian
- Engineering – Bojan Dugic
- Mixing – Phil Tan

"Attention"

- Saxophone – Bjorn Almgren
- Other instrumentation and arrangements – Fredrik Odesjo, Andreas Levander, Guy Sebastian
- Production – Fredrik Odesjo, Andreas Levander
- Mixing – Fredrik Odesjo, Rob Kinelski

"Hold on I'm Comin'" and "Take Me to the River"

- Background vocals – Susan Marshall, Jackie Johnson
- Background vocal arrangements – Guy Sebastian
- Guitar – Steve Cropper, Dave Smith
- Extra guitar parts – Carl Dimitago
- Bass – Donald "Duck" Dunn
- Drums – Steve Potts
- Piano, keyboard, horn arrangements – Lester Snell
- Organ – Rick Steff
- Tenor saxophone – Jim Spake
- Baritone Saxophone – Kirk Smothers
- Trumpet – Scott Thompson
- Trombone – Howard Lamb
- Production – Steve Cropper, Guy Sebastian
- Engineering – Curry Weber, Alan Burcham
- Mixing – Steve Greenwell

"Climb Every Mountain"

- Background vocals – Darren Percival, Shauna Jensen
- Orchestra – Sydney International Orchestra
- Production, orchestration and conducting – John Foreman
- Engineering and mixing – Tod Deeley, Braddon Williams

"Kryptonite" (Radio edit)

- Background vocals and vocal arrangements – Guy Sebastian
- Guitars – Grecco Buratto
- Other instruments – Beau Dozzier
- String and horn arrangements – John Foreman, Braddon Williams
- Production and programming – Beau Dozzier
- Engineering – Richard Lush
- Mixing – Dave Pensado

"Never Hold You Down"

- Background vocals – CC White
- Guitar – Joshua Lopez
- Keyboard – Zac Rae
- Trumpet – Jumaane Smith
- Tenor saxophone – Bob Reynolds
- Violin – Mary Kathryne VanOsdale, David Davidson
- Viola – Monissa Angell
- Cello – John Catchings
- String arrangements – Calvin Turner
- Production – Fredrik Odesjo
- Mixing – John Fields
- Additional programming – Fredrik Odesjo, Andreas Levander

"My Beautiful Friend"

- Background vocals – Guy Sebastian, Gary Pinto
- Guitars – Peter Northgate
- Programming – Adam Reily
- String arrangements – Adam Reily, Bruce Heald
- Engineering – Craig Porteils
- Mixing – David Hemming

Disc two

All tracks

- Vocals and piano – Guy Sebastian
- Guitars and ukuleles – Carl Dimatago
- Percussion, drums, tin cans, spoons and wood logs – Terapai Richmond
- Double bass – Adam Ventoura
- Flutes and saxophones – Matt Ottignon
- String arrangements – Calvin Turner
- Production – Guy Sebastian, Carl Dimataga
- Engineering – James "Shimmy" Griffiths

== Charts ==
=== Weekly charts ===
Chart (2010/11)	Peak position
Australian Albums (ARIA)	4
New Zealand Albums (RMNZ)	24

=== Year-end charts ===
Chart (2010)	Position
Australian Albums Chart	27
Australian Artist Albums Chart	5
Chart (2011)	Position
Australian Albums Chart	60
Australian Artist Albums Chart	13

=== Decade-end charts ===
Chart (2010–2019)	Position
Australian Albums (ARIA)	84
Australian Artist Albums (ARIA)	16

== Certification ==
Country	Certification
Australia	2× Platinum
New Zealand	Gold

== Release history ==
Region	Date	Label	Format	Catalogue
Australia	19 November 2010	Sony Music Australia	CD, digital download	88697800722
New Zealand	29 November 2010	Sony Music Australia	CD, digital download	88697800722
