= Candle (Guy Sebastian song) =

Single by Guy Sebastian

from the album Part 1
- Released: 9 September 2016
- Genre: Pop
- Length: 3:16
- Label: Sony Music Australia
- Songwriters: Guy Sebastian; Jon Hume; Trey Campbell
- Producer: Jon Hume

Guy Sebastian singles chronology
"Desert" (2016)	"Candle" (2016)	"Set in Stone" (2016)

"Candle" is a song by Australian recording artist Guy Sebastian. It was released as the lead single from Sebastian's forthcoming extended play Part 1. "Candle" peaked at number 59 on the ARIA Singles Chart. The song became his 26th Top 100 entry.

The song was the result of a mid-year studio session with Jon Hume and Trey Campbell. The song is described as a "contemporary serenade is about kicking aside temptations on the road when you know the key to your heart is waiting at home." Sebastian dedicated the song to his wife Jules.

Sebastian performed a stripped-back version of the song live for Music Feeds.

== Critical reception ==
Emmy Mack from Music Feeds described the song as "an electro-soul stomper packed with processed guitars and thumping drum loops that sounds like the mutant offspring of Hozier, Flume, Diplo, SAFIA and Nothing But Thieves, only with Guy Smiley’s unmistakable golden pipes shining at the fore." He added, "it sounds not-one-single-bit similar to "Battle Scars", "Like It Like That", "Elevator Love" or any of the other ear worm FM radio pop tunes that we’ve heard from homeboy in the past."

== Music video ==
The video premiered on 28 September 2016. It was a Flutter Films production.

== Track listing ==
- Digital download
1. "Candle" – 3:16
- Remixes Single
1. "Candle" (M-Phazes Remix) – 2:46

== Commercial performance and charts ==
"Candle" peaked at number 59 on the ARIA singles chart in September 2016. Feedback from commercial radio playlists suggested "Candle" “sits in between pop and Triple M because of the rock guitars.” and it received little airplay. In an interview in December 2016, Sebastian said “You are so insecure as an artist so I felt crap when "Candle" did so badly. I love the song and it’s Jules’ favourite of everything I’ve done. I would rather keep trying new things that inspire me.”

=== Weekly charts ===
Chart (2016)	Peak position
Australia (ARIA)	59
