= Mind on You =

Mind on You may refer to:

- "Mind on You" (Guy Sebastian song), 2017 song by Guy Sebastian from the EP Part 1
- "Mind on You" (George Birge song), 2022 song by George Birge from the EP George Birge
