= Set in Stone (song) =

Single by Guy Sebastian

from the album Consicious and from the EP Part 1
- Released: 28 October 2016
- Genre: Pop
- Length: 3:40
- Label: Sony Music Australia
- Songwriters: Guy Sebastian; Stuart Crichton; Taylor Parks
- Producers: M-Phazes; Stuart Crichton

Guy Sebastian singles chronology
"Candle" (2016)	"Set in Stone" (2016)	"Mind on You" (2017)

"Set in Stone" is a song by Australian recording artist Guy Sebastian. It was released as the second single from Sebastian's extended play Part 1 (2016). It was also included as a track on Sebastian's ninth studio album, Conscious. The song reached number 11 on the Australian Singles Chart, and was certified 2× platinum. Although it didn't chart in New Zealand it achieved gold certification there.

== Background ==
The inspiration for "Set in stone" came when Sebastian was on asongwriting trip in Bali. Sebastian said: "You know, there are a lot of things in life that are fleeting, there are a lot of things that come and go, people that come and go and experiences that come and go, but then there's those things that are there forever. The people that are there forever that support you and love you. This song is all about holding onto those things.

In an interview with KIIS FM's Kyle and Jackie O, Sebastian gave more detail as to the inspiration and recalled how he witnessed a scooter accident that left him holding a young boy's hand as he died on the side of the road. Sebastian said "The [kid] sort of just ended up stopping breathing, Literally as I was holding his hand. I still get flashbacks of it, because I'll never get that image of that kid out of my head. "The song's mainly about Jules now," he explained. "It's basically about things that are forever. As you know, I've been with her a long time…you go through ups and downs, but there's things that are just set in stone that last for a long time. "

== Music video ==
The music video for "Set in Stone" was released on 7 November 2016.

AuspOp said: "It's a staggeringly beautiful song that resonates more with each and every listen. And the clip is one of the strongest to come out of the Sony Australia stable in years."

== Track listing ==
- Digital download
1. "Set in Stone" – 3:40

== Charts ==
Chart (2016)	Peak position
Australia (ARIA)	11
New Zealand Heatseekers (RMNZ)	10

== Certifications ==
Region	Certification	Certified units/sales
Australia (ARIA)	2× Platinum	140,000^{‡}
New Zealand (RMNZ)	Gold	15,000^{‡}
^{‡} Sales+streaming figures based on certification alone.
