= Like It Like That (album) =

Studio album by Guy Sebastian
- Released: 23 October 2009
- Recorded: November 2008 – September 2009
- Genres: Soul, pop, R&B
- Labels: Sony Music Australia, Red Int/Red Ink
- Producers: David Ryan Harris, Fredrik Odesjo

Guy Sebastian chronology
The Memphis Album (2007)	Like It Like That (2009)	Twenty Ten (2010)

Singles from Like It Like That
- 1. "Like It Like That" Released: 13 August 2009; 2. "Art of Love featuring Jordin Sparks" Released: 20 November 2009; 3. "All to Myself" Released: 26 February 2010; 4. "Never Hold You Down" Released: 4 June 2010

Like It Like That is the fifth studio album by Australian singer Guy Sebastian. The album was produced by David Ryan Harris and Fredrik Odesjo and was released in Australia on 23 October 2009 and in the US on 29 June 2010. The album contains a duet with Jordin Sparks, and also three tracks with John Mayer on guitar and backing vocals. It peaked at number six on the ARIA Albums Chart and gained platinum certification. The title track "Like It Like That" reached number one on the ARIA Singles Chart, and achieved 5× platinum certification. "Art of Love" was also a top ten single, spending five months in the ARIA top 50 and double platinum certification. In 2010 Sebastian received six ARIA Music Award nominations for the album and two of its singles.

== Writing and development ==
Like It Like That is an album of original soul music influenced by Sebastian's previous album, The Memphis Album, which was a covers album of Memphis soul songs recorded with members of The MGs including Steve Cropper in Memphis in 2007. Sebastian and Cropper remained friends, and Sebastian made several songwriting trips to Nashville in mid-2008, staying with the Croppers on these trips. Sebastian said in an interview with The Age in October 2009, "The most comfortable I've ever felt in the studio was during The Memphis Album. And the success of that prompted me to make a record like this one." Five of the songs on Like It Like That were co-written with the album's producer David Ryan Harris, four were written entirely by Sebastian himself, and three were co-written with other writers. He later said, "I wrote the music on this album based on how I feel when I listen to the Otis Reddings and the Wilson Picketts of the world. I'll put that music on and it always just lifts me and makes me feel great."

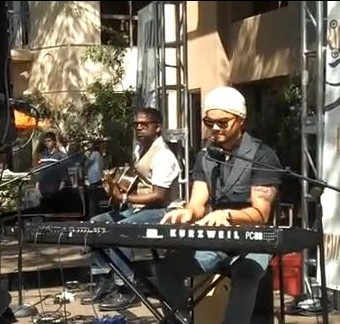
Guy Sebastian performing with David Ryan Harris at SXSW, in Austin, Texas March 2009

In late 2008 Sebastian again travelled to the US to record some of the tracks with members of John Mayer's band. Mayer was invited to the recording sessions to put a guitar solo on one track, but stayed to contribute guitar and backing vocals on four songs. One of these songs was not included on the album. The three which are on the album are "All to Myself", "Failed to Mention" and "Never Be You". The album's second single "Art of Love" is a ballad co-written by Sebastian and Adam Rielly. It was written as a duet, but Sebastian was unable to find a singer in Australia to record it with. He had also submitted the track to Jordin Sparks, and shortly before the album was due to be released Sparks agreed to sing on the track. Sebastian flew to Los Angeles to record her vocals and later returned to film the video with her. The final track on the album, "Perfection", was written by Sebastian as a tribute to his wife Jules, and was sung by him at their wedding. He was not going to release it originally, but was persuaded by friends and family to add it to the album.

Sebastian said in an interview in late 2009 that the songs for the album originally had a much more organic old school sound, as his US record company had wanted the album to have a similar sound to The Memphis Album. He said he didn't feel that was right for the Australian market, "I ended up with a new record of original songs that didn't have quite the right production, like it all sounded quite old school, it didn't really have a modern edge to it. I ended up going back and reproducing everything which was quite a nightmare. I mean "Like It Like That" for example was really old school, like real drums, real organic, so we reproduced that and we got it to sound a little more modern, in your face I guess, the way it is now and we did that with a lot of the tracks so yeah, it was a bit of a nightmare getting to the final product". Sebastian said he felt he was exactly where he wanted to be creatively with this album: "I'm in a really happy place musically, because this is exactly the style of music I want to do and that I've wanted to do for so long. It's not about me changing the world; it's just about fun music – pure and simple. Music is so powerful. It's powerful enough on a personal level, without me trying to change the world."

== Release and promotion ==
"Like It Like That", the lead single and album title track, was released to radio in July 2009. It was the number one played song on Australian radio for five weeks. Sebastian performed the song on the Grand Final of the Seven Network's Dancing with the Stars in August 2009, and "Like It Like That" was used extensively by the network for their program promotions from August 2009 through to early 2010. The album was released on 23 October 2009. During the release week Sebastian made instore promotional appearances in New South Wales and South Australia which drew large crowds. The second single "Art of Love" was released in November 2009. Sparks was meant to come to Australia to perform the song with Sebastian at the Australian Idol Grand Final, but due to her being taken ill with acute appendicitis she was unable to make the trip. Sebastian performed the song alone using the video for Spark's vocal parts. They eventually performed the song together in July 2010 during her American Battlefield Tour. During December 2009 and January 2010 Channel 7 used "Art of Love" for the summer promotion of their drama series Home and Away. Sebastian toured the capital cities in February 2010 and a did a regional tour in June and July 2010. In June he was the featured performer for a Take 40 Live Lounge concert. He sang songs from the album as well as covers of some of his favourite artists. The concert was screened on Channel Ten in July 2010. ARIA held five special concerts in the leadup to the ARIA Awards in November 2010 called the iTunes Live ARIA Awards Concert Series which were livestreamed on the internet and broadcast on Novafm. The genre category ARIA Awards were presented at these concerts. Sebastian was the headline act at one of the concerts. He also performed at the main ARIA Awards event where he sang a gospel inspired reworking of "Like It Like That" with a choir as the closing performance.

=== Singles ===
- "Like It Like That" peaked at number one on the ARIA Singles Chart. It spent 25 weeks in the Top 50, including 12 weeks in the top ten. It was the highest selling Australian artist song in Australia in 2009, and sixth highest seller overall. In January 2010 ARIA published a list of the highest selling songs of the previous decade. "Like It Like That" ranked number 29, the sixth highest entry for an Australian artist song, with Sebastian's debut single "Angels Brought Me Here" named the highest selling song in Australia last decade. In 2023 "Like it Like That" reached 5× platinum certification. "Like It Like That" was also released in New Zealand in 2011, as the second single from Sebastian's retrospective album Twenty Ten. It peaked at number 30 and gained gold certification there.
- "Art of Love" which features Jordin Sparks debuted at number 34 on the ARIA Singles Chart. It climbed for seven weeks before reaching its peak of number eight. "Art of Love" spent 21 weeks in the ARIA Top 50, including five weeks in the top ten, and gained double platinum certification. The song became Sebastian's first single to chart in New Zealand since 2004, peaking at number seven and gaining gold certification.
- "All to Myself" was released to radio in February 2010 and spent three months in the ARIA Top 100, peaking at number 51.
- "Never Hold You Down" was released to radio by the end of May 2010 and released digitally on 4 June 2010.

== Critical reception ==
The title track "Like It Like That" was named one of the best singles of the year by both Rave Magazine and The Music Network. The album received many positive reviews. Paul Cashmere from Undercover Music wrote, "By covering the classics on The Memphis Album Guy Sebastian discovered Guy Sebastian. He has drawn from that epitome and created what should be considered the debut album from the next phase of his career. [...] If The Memphis Album was Guy's initiation into becoming a Soul Man then Like It Like That is the graduation. Ara Jansen said in The West Australian, "While there are plenty of pop elements to the album, Sebastian has finally and unabashedly unleashed his soul side. He's also done it with a big grin on his face as songs such as the wonderful "Magic" and the title track fizz like a soft drink on a hot day." A reviewer for TV Central wrote, "There's no doubt in anyone's mind that Sebastian's previous 'Memphis' record has inspired him like no other. From the first beat of his new album, it screams soul. It's bold, brash, but it works – it really works. It's probably one of the most cohesive albums from Sebastian to date. Listening from start to finish, you truly feel like you’ve experienced a musical journey. [...] The album, while not without its flaws, is definitely one of the most artistically complex records we've heard from an 'Australian Idol' artist to date. It's rich, multi-layered and engaging."

In a review in the Sunday Herald Sun Bryan Patterson gave Like It Like That a 4 out of 5 star rating and said, "Happily, Sebastian's big soul songs have more of an upbeat New York sound than the slick and imposed LA production that seems to be the fate of most Idol winners. It is now time to forgive and forget that Sebastian had his start in a sometimes exploitative and often tacky TV talent show. When you're good – really good – inauspicious starts don't really matter[...] Sebastian has paid his dues and finally found his sound. And it's good music, all written or co-written by the young man." The Daily Telegraph music editor Kathy McCabe also gave the album 4 out of 5 stars saying, "Sebastian steps up in songwriting and performance on the soul tracks which were no doubt inspired by his Memphis sessions detour. "All to Myself" is a knock-out song, and book-end song "Attention" is a sexy, hip-swinging soul number which perfectly showcases Sebastian's vocal range." American radio announcer and music journalist Tony Peters wrote, "Great soul music is still out there, you just gotta hunt for it. In this case, that means going halfway around the world. [...] "All to Myself" and "Attention" both have that classic Motown stompin' feel that makes you move your feet, while "Bring Yourself" has conversational lyrics akin to Stevie Wonder's best work. Sebastian had a hand in composing the entire album, and he doesn't just re-write classic soul songs. He's obviously immersed himself in the genre and can truly add to it."

=== Accolades ===
Art of Love" was one of the twenty songs shortlisted for the 2010 APRA Song of the Year and "All to Myself" was shortlisted in 2011. Sebastian received two peer judged ARIA Music Award nominations in 2010. The album was nominated for Best Pop Release, and he was nominated as Best Male Artist. Sebastian also received nominations for Most Popular Australian Artist, Most Popular Australian Album, and Most popular Australian Single for "Like It Like That" and "Art of Love.

== Commercial performance ==
Like It Like That peaked at number six on the ARIA Albums Chart, spending 29 weeks in the ARIA top 100, including 19 nonconsecutive weeks in the top 50, and gained platinum certification.

== US album ==
In 2008 Sebastian gained a contract to release his previous album The Memphis Album in the US. The release was later changed to only include three of the soul cover songs from The Memphis Album, with the other eight tracks being songs which he had recorded for his fifth Australian album. Sebastian stated in an interview with the Sunday Telegraph, "They were originally just going to release The Memphis Album, but I don't want to be known as a covers artist here. It was all right in Australia, because it was my fourth album, but I want some originals on there." The album was set to be released in mid-2009, under the title Like It Like That.

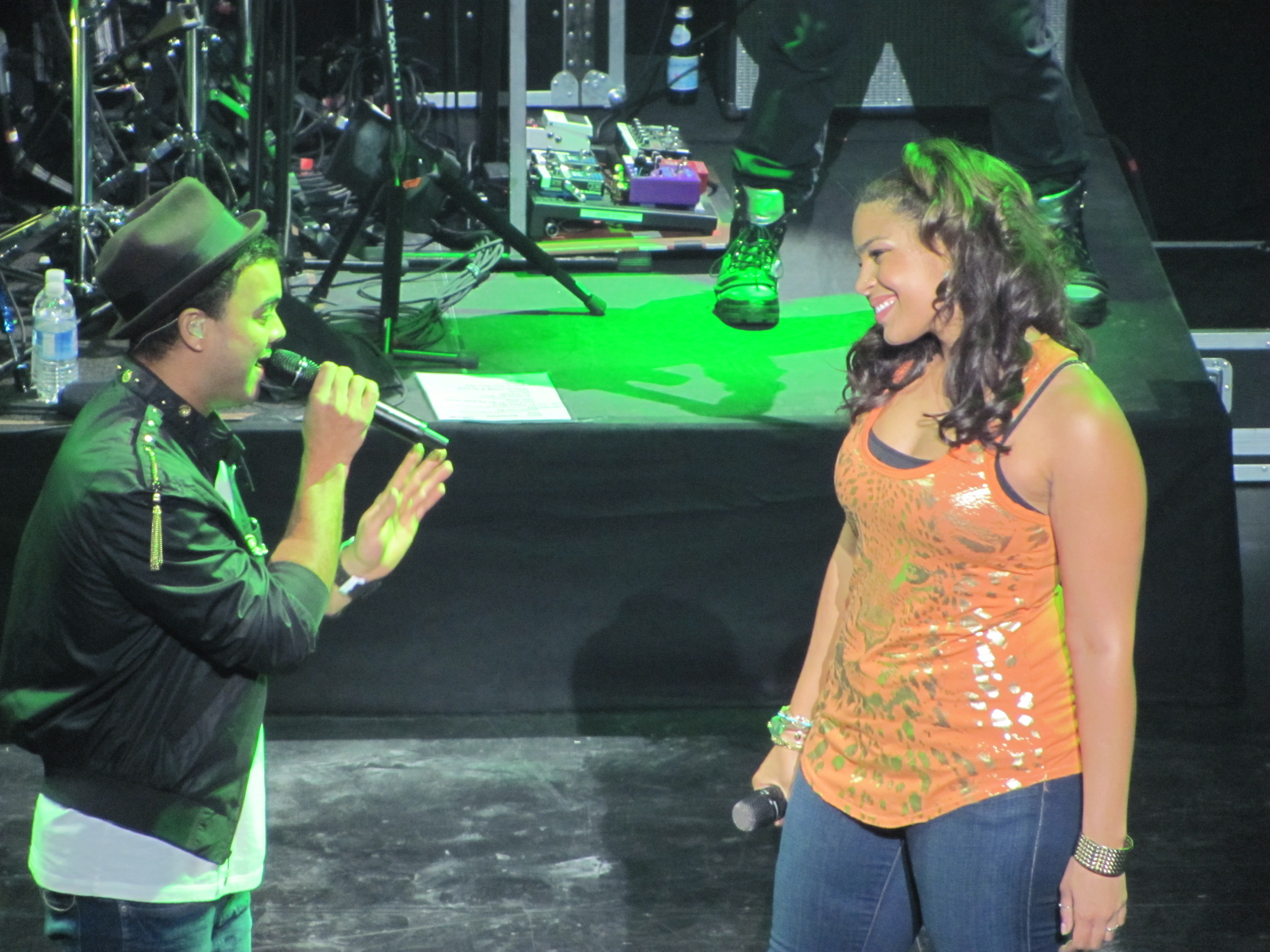
Sebastian & Jordin Sparks performing "Art of Love" at Club Nokia LA July 2010

Sebastian spent much of the early part of 2009 in the US, continuing to work on his Australian album, and also doing promotion for the release of the US album. He performed at Oscar Haven, a three-day entertainment event held in Beverly Hills during the Academy Awards, at which he was a headline act at a Haven party hosted by Stardust Pictures and Jamie Kennedy. He was invited to perform at the music festival SXSW in Austin Texas, including showcases at Sounds Australia and the BMI Acoustic Brunch. Sebastian also gained a four-week residency at the Drom in New York, and he and Steve Cropper were invited to perform at the Ninth Annual NonCommvention in Philadelphia, which is the annual conference for North America's non-commercial Triple A radio.

"Like It Like That", the title track from the album, was picked up by the NBC network and used in their summer promotion campaign. Shortly before the album was due for release, Victor Records, the subdivision of Sony America's Commercial Group Sebastian was signed to, underwent restructuring. This caused the release to be delayed, but Commercial later reaffirmed the album would be released in the US in 2010. The US album is now identical to the Australian album, and was released on 29 June 2010 under the Red Ink label. In July Sebastian performed "Art of Love" with Sparks at three of her Battlefield Tour concerts while he was touring in the US to promote the release of his album.

== Track listing ==
No.	Title	Writer(s)	Length
1.	"Like It Like That"	Guy Sebastian, David Ryan Harris, Sean Hurley	4:00
2.	"All to Myself"	Guy Sebastian, Carl Dimatago	4:32
3.	"Art of Love" (Featuring Jordin Sparks)	Guy Sebastian, Adam Reily, Stuart Crichton	3:58
4.	"Attention"	Guy Sebastian, Fredrik Odesjo, Andreas Levander	3:27
5.	"Magic" (Featuring Tarryn Stokes)	Guy Sebastian	4:21
6.	"Bring Yourself"	Guy Sebastian	3:40
7.	"Never Hold You Down"	Guy Sebastian, David Ryan Harris	3:36
8.	"Fail to Mention"	David Ryan Harris, Guy Sebastian	4:13
9.	"Never Be You"	Guy Sebastian, David Ryan Harris, Sean Hurley	4:25
10.	"Coming Home"	Guy Sebastian, David Ryan Harris	4:00
11.	"Undo"	Guy Sebastian	3:46
12.	"Perfection"	Guy Sebastian	3:29
13.	"I Feel a Fire" (iTunes bonus track)	Guy Sebastian	3:20

== Personnel ==
Credits adapted from the Like It Like That liner notes.

- Guy Sebastian – vocals, piano, keyboard, drums, guitar, instrumental arrangements
- Jordin Sparks – featured vocals ("Art of Love")
- Tarryn Stokes – featured vocals ("Magic")
- David Ryan Harris – producer, background vocals, mellotron, glockenspiel, tambourine, acoustic guitar
- Fredrik Odesjo – producer, instrumental arrangements
- John Mayer – electric guitar, background vocals ("All to Myself", "Fail to Mention" and "Never Be You")
- Joshua Lopez – guitar
- Michael Chaves – electric guitar, acoustic guitar
- Sean Hurley – bass
- Zac Rae – piano, clavinet, keyboard, organ(Farlisa, B3, Wurlitzer)
- JJ Johnson – drums, tambourine
- CC White – background vocals
- Angel Taylor – background vocals
- Stuart Crichton – beats, bass, programming
- Adam Reilly – piano, keyboards
- Andreas Levendar – instrumental arrangements
- Carl Dimatago – guitar, bass
- Victor Row – piano
- Jumaane Smith – trumpet
- Angus Gomm – trumpet
- Ben Gurton – trombone
- Bob Reynelds – tenor saxophone
- David Moyer – baritone saxophone, flute
- Steve Fitzmaurice – baritone saxophone
- Bjorn Almgren – saxophone
- Calvin Turner – string arrangements
- David Angell – violin
- Mary Kathryn VanOsdale – violin
- David Davidson – violin
- Marianne Broadfoot – violin
- Kerry Martin – violin
- Monissa Angell – viola
- John Catchings – cello
- Rachel Maio – cello

== Charts ==
=== Weekly charts ===
Chart (2009/10)	Peak position
Australian Albums (ARIA)	6
New Zealand Albums (RMNZ)	28

=== Year-end charts ===
Chart (2009)	Position
Australian Albums Chart	63
Australian Artist Albums Chart	18
Chart (2010)	Position
Australian Artist Albums Chart	36

== Certification ==
Region	Certification	Certified units/sales
Australia (ARIA)	Platinum	70,000^{^}
^{^} Shipments figures based on certification alone.

== Release history ==
Region	Date	Label	Format	Catalogue
Australia	23 October 2009	Sony Music Australia	CD, digital download	88697580922
New Zealand	5 March 2010	Sony Music Australia	CD, digital download	88697580922
United States	29 June 2010	RED INT/RED INK	CD, digital download	886977446726
