= Titus Day =

Australian talent agent

- Born: 1973 (age 52–53)
- Education: University of Sydney
- Occupation: Talent agent

Titus Day is an Australian talent agent, known for his high profile celebrity clients

== Biography ==
Day, born in 1973 attended Sydney Grammar School, before graduating from the University of Sydney.

He worked as in-house Legal Counsel at IMG. In 2009 Day founded 6 Degrees Group. Clients included Tina Arena, Lara Bingle, Cassette Kids, Grant Denyer, Brett Kimmorley, Sophie Monk, Lyndsey Rodrigues, Guy Sebastian, Axle Whitehead and Jim Wilson.

== Legal issues ==
In 2017 Guy Sebastian alleged that Day had defrauded him. In June 2022 Day was found guilty of embezzling Sebastian of $620,000 in the District Court of New South Wales. In November 2022 Day was sentenced to four years in prison with a non-parole period of two and a half years. In June 2023 Day was released from custody after an appeal resulted in a retrial.
