= Evangeline Thillayampalam =

Sri Lankan educator

Evangeline Mutthama Thillayampalam (c. 1900 – 23 November 1976) was a Sri Lankan educator.

== Biography ==
Thillayampalam was from Allaipiddi in the Jaffna Peninsula. She attended Chundikuli Girls' College in Jaffna. She went on to complete a master's degree in science at the University of Allahabad in Uttar Pradesh, India, followed by a doctorate at Columbia University, New York. She became a lecturer in Lucknow, India, at Isabella Thoburn College.

In 1941, Thillayampalam returned to Sri Lanka and in 1943 was appointed principal of her former school, Chundikuli Girls' College. She was the first Sri Lankan and the first non-European principal of the institution, which had previously been led exclusively by British missionaries since its founding in 1896. Her appointment marked a significant shift in the school's leadership, breaking a nearly five-decade tradition of European missionary principals.

== In popular culture ==
Thillayampalam is a relative of the Australian singer-songwriter Guy Sebastian, as revealed in a 2026 episode of the television series Who Do You Think You Are?.
