= Part 1 (EP) =

EP by Guy Sebastian
- Released: 2 December 2016
- Recorded: 2016
- Label: Sony Music Australia

Guy Sebastian chronology
Madness (2014)	Part 1 (2016)	Conscious (2017)

Singles from Part 1
- 1. "Candle" Released: 9 September 2016; 2. "Set in Stone" Released: 28 October 2016; 3. "Mind on You" Released: 10 March 2017

Part 1 is an extended play by Australian pop singer Guy Sebastian, released on 2 December 2016.

== Background and release ==
Sebastian released his seventh studio album Madness in November 2014. In May 2015, Sebastian competed in the Eurovision Song Contest in Vienna; coming fifth. Following this, Sebastian undertook a song-writing journey. Sebastian said; “I wrote songs for 18 months and ended up pretty much scrapping it all, because it took that long just to figure out what I don’t want to do.” He created playlists on streaming services, which assisted him discover the production he wanted adding “Once I clicked into the sound I wanted, it was much easier.”

The EP’s theme stems from a focus on love and celebrating the important things in life like his career, relationships and family and follows on from the lead single "Set In Stone" - a song dedicated to his wife, Jules.

== Reception ==
Kathy McCabe from news.com.au described the EP as "an eclectic collection of six songs which run the gamut of garage-flavoured R&B to electronic pop but all have two things in common, his distinctive voice and his muse Jules." adding "Sebastian has never been this personal in his lyrics... which all reassure his partner and mother of their two sons Hudson and Archer that she is the centre of his universe."

== Track listing ==
No.	Title	Writer(s)	Producer(s)	Length
1.	"Candle"	Guy Sebastian; Jon Hume; Trey Campbell	J. Hume	3:16
2.	"Home"	Sebastian; Sam Sakr; Sarah Aarons	Sakr	3:02
3.	"Set in Stone"	Sebastian; Stuart Crichton; Taylor Parks	Crichton; M-Phazes	3:40
4.	"Mind on You"	Sebastian; Campbell; Louis Schoorl	M-Phazes; Schoorl	3:32
5.	"Small Talk"	Sebastian; Dann Hume; Jon Hume; Trey Campbell	D. Hume & J. Hume	3:15
6.	"Conscious"	Sebastian; Campbell; Sakr	Sakr	3:27
Total length:				20:12

== Charts ==
Chart (2016)	Peak position
Australian Albums (ARIA)	31
New Zealand Heatseekers Albums (RMNZ)	10

== Release history ==
Region	Date	Format	Label	Catalogue
Australia	2 December 2016	Digital download	Sony Music Australia	
Australia	16 December 2016	CD	Sony Music Australia	88985396072
