= Art of Love (song) =

Single by Guy Sebastian featuring Jordin Sparks

from the album Like It Like That
- Released: 21 November 2009
- Recorded: 2009
- Genre: Soul; pop
- Length: 3:58
- Label: Sony Music
- Songwriters: Guy Sebastian, Adam Reily
- Producers: Stuart Crichton, Adam Reily, Guy Sebastian

Guy Sebastian singles chronology
"Like It Like That" (2009)	"Art of Love" (2009)	"All to Myself" (2010)

Jordin Sparks singles chronology
"S.O.S. (Let the Music Play)" (2009)	"Art of Love" (2009)	"Don't Let It Go to Your Head" (2010)

Audio sample
- file; help

External videos
- Official Music Video: Art of Love featuring Jordin Sparks

"Art of Love" was the second single from Australian pop singer Guy Sebastian's fifth album, Like It Like That. The single features the vocals of American R&B/pop singer, Jordin Sparks. "Art of Love" was released on 20 November 2009 and reached number eight on the ARIA singles chart and achieved double platinum certification. It was Sebastian's sixth of 14 top ten singles in Australia. It was also released in New Zealand, peaking at number seven, and was certified platinum there. "Art of Love" was used to promote the 2010 season of Australian drama Home and Away. The song was shortlisted for the 2010 APRA Song of the Year and received an ARIA Music Award nomination for Most Popular Australian Single.

== Background ==
"Art of Love" is a ballad co-written by Sebastian and Adam Reily. In an interview with Undercover Sebastian said it was a song that wasn't actually written for the album. "I was writing it as a pitch. I was just going to pitch it to another artist who was more maybe R&B. But after writing it I thought 'I don't care if stylistally it doesn't really fit'". The song was originally written as a duet, and Sebastian said they had Jordin Sparks in mind when writing it. "I wrote it with a friend Adam Reily.[...] I remember us sitting down writing it and thinking 'Jordin, she would be great for this. She would be awesome'. But in the back of our minds, both our minds we're like 'but it's Jordin Sparks. She's a big American, well global star[...]and some random Aussie. Why would she do it'?" He said they never expected her to agree to do the song, so they didn't contact her originally. In an interview with The Daily Telegraph in October 2009 Sebastian said, "We didn't even go there, didn't even ask her." He approached Australian artists, but none were interested, and because of this "Art of Love" was originally recorded as a solo for the album. Sebastian then decided to submit the song to Sparks. He said, "I thought deep down that it was supposed to have Jordin on there so I sent it to her. Literally overnight, she came back and said she loved the song and would love to do it as soon as she came off tour with Britney." The album release was delayed so Sebastian could fly to New York to record Sparks' vocals. He returned to the US in November 2009 to film the video with her. Sebastian included an acoustic solo version of "Art of Love" on his album Twenty Ten released in November 2010.

== Critical reception ==
"Art of Love" was one of the twenty songs shortlisted for the 2010 APRA Song of the Year. It received positive reviews. Kathy McCabe, music editor of The Daily Telegraph wrote, "The turbo-charged power duet with Jordin Sparks is tailor-made for commercial radio playlists." American radio announcer and music journalist Tony Peters said "Art of Love" showed that as well as being able to write "great soul tunes" Sebastian could write "straight-ahead pop tunes." Peters said it showed "Sebastian can hang with what's on the charts." Music site auspOp said it was "a great little ballad that works rather well by having the two voices playing off each other." Jamie Horne of The Border Mail wrote, "Art of Love, a duet with American Idol counterpart Jordin Sparks could give Sebastian a US hit".

== Release and promotion ==
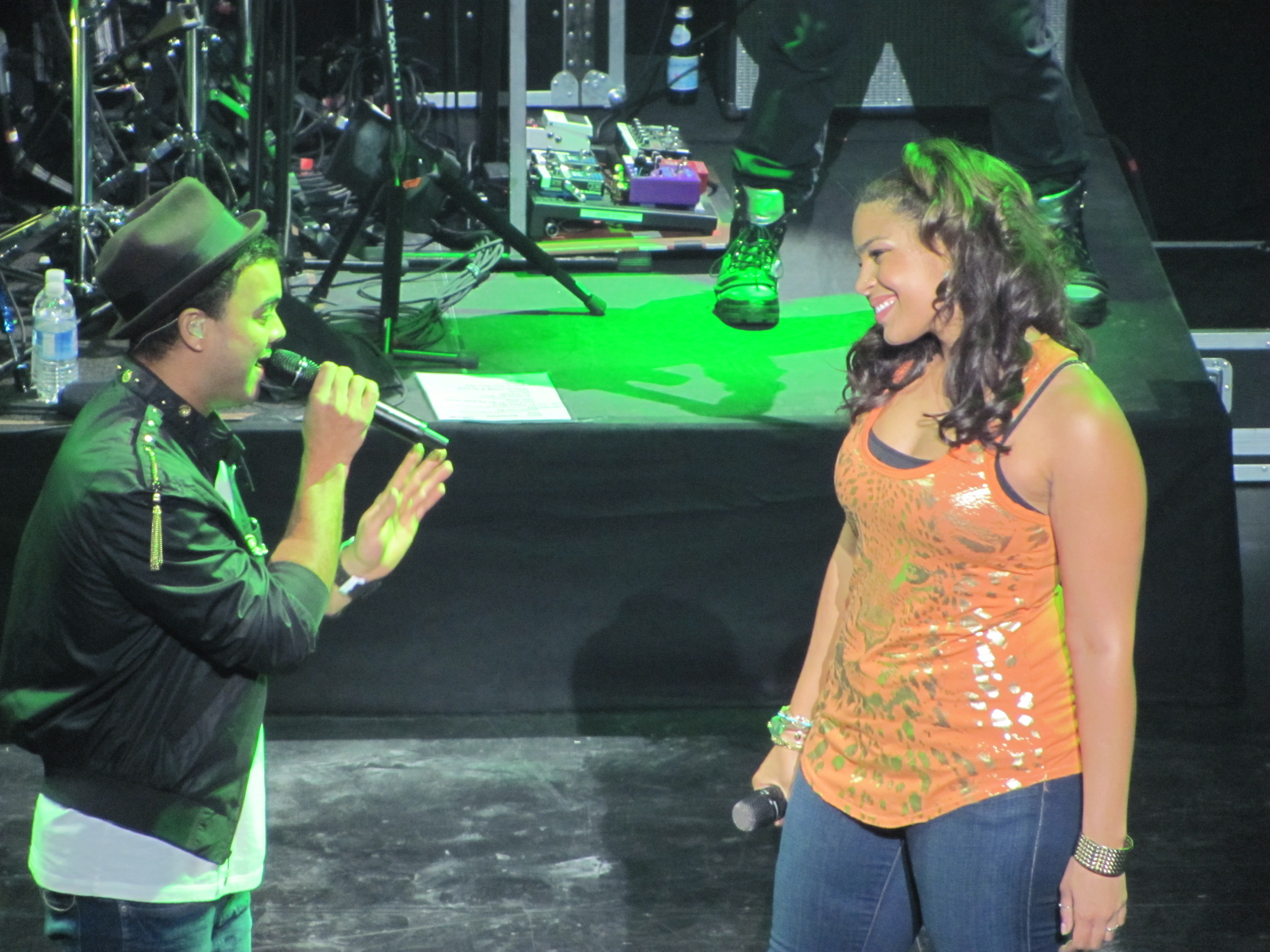
Sebastian & Sparks perform "Art of Love" at Club Nokia LA July,2010

"Art of Love" was released in digital and physical format on 15 November 2009. The physical CD contains two Michael Jackson acoustic covers, "Ben" and "Man in the Mirror", with the digital EP having an extra Jackson cover, "You Are Not Alone". "Art of Love" peaked at number 11 in national radio airplay. Sebastian and Sparks were meant to perform the duet on the Australian Idol Grand Final in November 2009 which was aired in Australia and New Zealand, but Sparks was unable to come to Australia due to acute appendicitis. Sebastian still performed the song at the Finale, using the music video for Jordin's vocal parts. "Art of Love" was used extensively for the promotion of the 2010 season of the Seven Network's Home and Away. It was used in a series of commercials showing scenes from future episodes featuring couples from the show. The commercials ran throughout December 2009 and January 2010. During concerts and other appearances Sebastian performed "Art of Love" with various female vocalists including his current backing singer Carmen Smith. He also sometimes performs the song as a solo, including a performance during his Take 40 Lounge Live Lounge concert which aired on Channel Ten in July 2010. Sebastian and Sparks did eventually perform "Art of Love" on stage together. In July 2010 while Sebastian was touring the west coast of the US to promote the release of Like It Like That they performed the song at three of Spark's Battlefield Tour concerts.

== Music video ==
Sebastian and Sparks filmed the video for "Art of Love" in Los Angeles, California in November 2009. The video commences with Sebastian and Sparks at separate locations. Sebastian is depicted as a musician working in a studio and Sparks as a star on a photoshoot. Too busy in their work lives they communicate with each other over the phone. Near the end of the video they both rush away to meet in a forest.

== Credits and personnel ==
- Writers – Guy Sebastian, Adam Reily
- Lead vocals – Guy Sebastian
- Featured vocals – Jordin Sparks
- Piano, keyboards – Adam Reily
- Beats, bass and programming – Stuart Critchton
- Production – Stuart Critchton, Adam Reily, Guy Sebastian
- Engineering – Bojan Dugic
- Mixing – Phil Tan

Credits taken from Like It Like That album liner notes.

== Track listing ==
CD
No.	Title	Length
1.	"Art of Love" (featuring Jordin Sparks)	3:58
2.	"Ben" (acoustic)	2:45
3.	"Man in the Mirror" (acoustic)	3:50

Digital download
No.	Title	Length
1.	"Art of Love" (featuring Jordin Sparks)	3:58
2.	"Ben" (acoustic)	2:45
3.	"Man in the Mirror" (acoustic)	3:50
4.	"You Are Not Alone" (acoustic)	4:20

== Charts and certifications ==
"Art of Love" peaked at number eight on the ARIA Singles Chart, becoming Sebastian's sixth of 14 top ten singles in Australia. Although only released in mid November it was the 20th highest selling Australian artist single of 2009. It was also the 12th highest selling Australian artist single in 2010. It spent 21 weeks in the ARIA top 50 including five weeks in the top ten and was certified double platinum in 2014. "Art of Love" was also released in New Zealand in February 2010 and reached number seven and platinum certification there. It was Sebastian's third top ten single in New Zealand.

=== Weekly charts ===
Chart (2009–10)	Peak position
Australia (ARIA)	8
New Zealand (Recorded Music NZ)	7

=== Year-end charts ===
Chart (2009)	Position
Australia (ARIA)	83
Australian Artist (ARIA)	20

Chart (2010)	Position
Australia (ARIA)	90
Australian Artist (ARIA)	12

== Certifications ==
Region	Certification	Certified units/sales
Australia (ARIA)	2× Platinum	140,000^{^}
New Zealand (RMNZ)	Platinum	15,000^{*}
^{*} Sales figures based on certification alone.^{^} Shipments figures based on certification alone.
