= Never Hold You Down =

Single by Guy Sebastian

from the album Like It Like That
- Released: 4 June 2010
- Recorded: 2009
- Genre: Pop, R&B, soul
- Length: 3:36 (album version); 3:29 (radio edit)
- Label: Sony Music
- Songwriter(s): Guy Sebastian, David Ryan Harris

Guy Sebastian singles chronology
"All To Myself" (2010)	"Never Hold You Down" (2010)	"Who's That Girl" (2010)

External videos
- Never Hold You Down was filmed in Venice Beach boardwalk in Los Angeles

"Never Hold You Down" is the fourth single released from Australian singer, Guy Sebastian's fifth studio album, Like It Like That. The single was released digitally on 4 June 2010. The video for the single was released on Friday 28 May 2010 and premiered on ABC's Rage music program the next day

== Track listing ==
CD, digital download
No.	Title	Length
1.	"Never Hold You Down" (radio mix)	3:29

== Release history ==
Country	Release date	Format	Label
Australia	4 June 2010	Digital download	Sony BMG
