= Out with My Baby =

2004 single by Guy Sebastian

Single by Guy Sebastian

from the album Beautiful Life
- Released: 27 September 2004
- Recorded: 2004
- Length: 3:38
- Label: BMG Australia
- Songwriters: Guy Sebastian; Robin Thicke; James Gass
- Producers: Robin Thicke; Pro Jay

Guy Sebastian singles chronology
"All I Need Is You" (2004)	"Out with My Baby" (2004)	"Kryptonite" (2004)

"Out with My Baby" is a song by Australian singer-songwriter Guy Sebastian. It was co-written by Sebastian and Robin Thicke, who also produced this single alongside Pro Jay. "Out with My Baby" topped the Australian Singles Chart and was accredited platinum by Australian Recording Industry Association (ARIA).

== Music video ==
A music video was produced to promote the single. In the video, Sebastian is seen dancing and singing in an outdoors club atmosphere at night. This version of the video replaced an earlier one where Sebastian was singing in a recording studio with his fantasies being projected around him. Sony BMG eventually scrapped the concept because it portrayed Sebastian as "too pop".

== Track listing ==
Australian CD single

1. "Out with My Baby" – 3:38
2. "Out with My Baby" (Clipse remix) – 4:10
3. "Out with My Baby" (ATFC's Afros & Shelltoes remix) – 8:18

== Charts ==
=== Weekly charts ===
Chart (2004)	Peak position
Australia (ARIA)	1
Australian Urban (ARIA)	1

=== Year-end charts ===
Chart (2004)	Position
Australia (ARIA)	69

== Certifications ==
Region	Certification	Certified units/sales
Australia (ARIA)	Platinum	70,000^{^}
^{^} Shipments figures based on certification alone.
