= Guy Sebastian =

Australian singer (born 1981)

Guy Sebastian AM
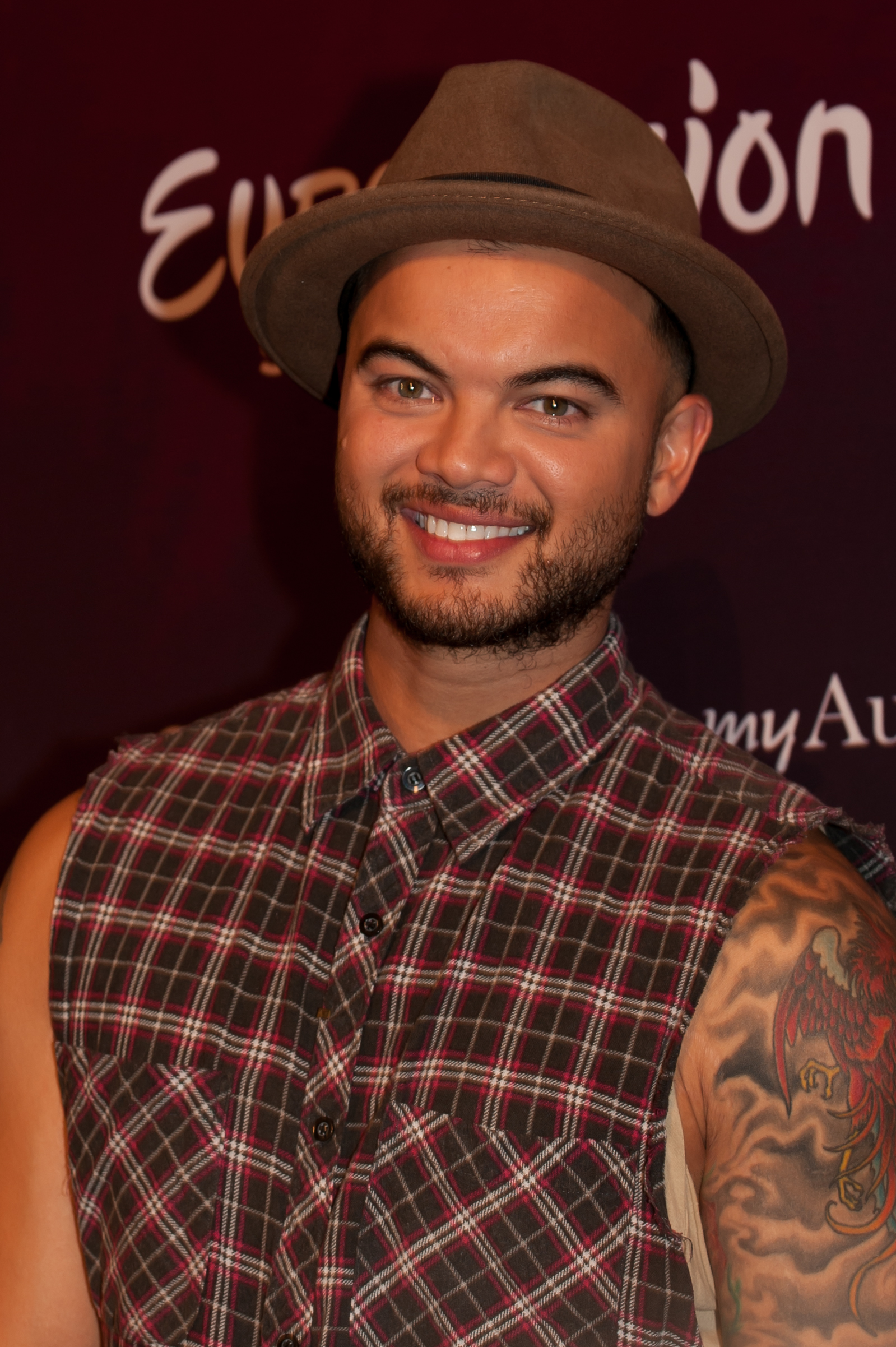
- Sebastian in 2015
- Born: Guy Theodore Sebastian; 26 October 1981 (age 45); Klang, Selangor, Malaysia
- Occupations: Singer; songwriter; record producer
- Years active: 2003–present
- Spouse: Jules Egan (m. 2008)
- Children: 2
- Musical career
- Origin: Adelaide, South Australia
- Genres: Pop; R&B
- Instruments: Vocals; guitar; keyboards; piano; drums
- Labels: Sony; The Cherry Party; RAL; RCA
- Website: guysebastian.com

Guy Theodore Sebastian AM (born 26 October 1981) is an Australian singer, songwriter and record producer who rose to fame after winning the first season of Australian Idol, in 2003. Born in Malaysia and raised in Adelaide, Australia, Sebastian has since released eleven top ten albums, including three achieving number one in Australia. Eight have gained either platinum or multi-platinum certification. He has also achieved twenty three top twenty singles, with fourteen of them, reaching the top ten, including six achieving number one in Australia. Sebastian is the only Australian male artist in Australian chart history to achieve six number one singles, and places third overall for all Australian acts. Twelve of his singles have been certified multi-platinum, including the 14× platinum "Battle Scars". His debut single "Angels Brought Me Here" was the highest selling song in Australia in the decade 2000 to 2009. With eighty-two platinum and seven gold certifications and combined album and single sales of over six million in Australia, Sebastian has the highest certifications and sales of any Australian Idol contestant.

Sebastian has worked with a number of notable American musicians, including Brian McKnight, Robin Thicke, Steve Cropper, John Mayer, Jordin Sparks, Eve and Lupe Fiasco. "Battle Scars", a collaboration with Fiasco, spent 20 weeks on the US Billboard Hot 100 chart, peaking at number 71 and achieved 3× platinum certification. "Battle Scars" also reached number two in Norway and New Zealand. Sebastian has reached the top ten in New Zealand with an album and six singles, including two number ones, and gained eleven platinum and five gold certifications there. In 2015, he represented Australia in its debut in the Eurovision Song Contest with the song "Tonight Again", finishing in fifth place.

Throughout his career, Sebastian has received 34 ARIA Award nominations, winning seven including Best Pop Release and Best Live Act. Other awards include the APRA Urban Work of the Year, the [V] Oz Artist of the Year, Urban Music Awards for Best Male Artist and Best R&B Album, and an International Songwriting Competition award for "Battle Scars". Sebastian has sung at many notable events, including performing for Pope Benedict XVI, Oprah Winfrey and Queen Elizabeth II. Sebastian was previously an ambassador for World Vision Australia and the Australian Red Cross. Together with his spouse Jules, Sebastian created "The Sebastian Foundation." Sebastian was made a Member of the Order of Australia (AM) in the 2019 Queen's Birthday Honours in recognition of his significant service to music and charity. He was a judge on Australia's The X Factor from 2010 to 2012 and again from 2015 to 2016, and coach on The Voice Australia from 2019 to 2024. In 2024 Sebastian was inducted into the South Australian Music Hall of Fame

== Early life ==
Guy Theodore Sebastian was born in Klang, Selangor, on 26 October 1981. His father, Ivan Sebastian, was born in Malaysia and is of Sri Lankan Tamil descent, while his mother Nellie is an ethnic Eurasian with English and Indian ancestry and was raised in Kanpur, India. Born in India but blue-eyed and fair-skinned, there has always been confusion in the family about his mother Nellie's ethnicity. She was orphaned at a young age.

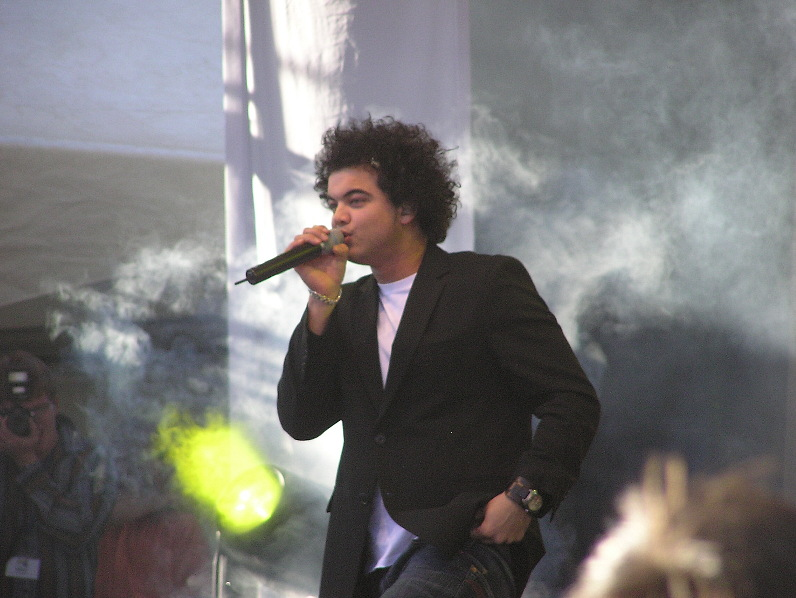
Sebastian performing at the Australian Gospel Music Festival, April 2004

Sebastian is the second of four sons. His older brother Ollie was born in India, and his younger brothers Chris and Jeremy were born in Australia. His family originally migrated to Melbourne when Sebastian was six. Four years later at the age of ten, his family migrated to Adelaide due to Ivan's work as a geologist at the time. This was where Sebastian spent his teenage years and began expanding his musical career.

In a 2026 episode of Who Do You Think You Are?, Sebastian took a DNA test, explaining that "there has been so much ambiguity around my genealogy." He discovered that his three-times-great-grandfather started his life in India as a British soldier, and found stories relating to the East India Company.

In Sri Lanka, Sebastian asked his father why he was named after his paternal grandfather. Ivan explained that he was very close to his own father, who worked for St John Ambulance. "He was always very encouraging, always had the nicest things to say," Ivan recalled. "Whilst I was studying geology in my second year, Dad met with an accident and he passed away." Ivan was away studying at the time and the family did not tell him for three months, fearing it would disrupt his exams. "Because I was so proud of my dad, of his achievements and his contribution to the community at large," Ivan explained, "I wanted you to have his name."

Sebastian also discovered he is a cousin of Evangeline Thillayampalam, a Sri Lankan educator and the first non-European principal of Chundikuli Girls' College in Jaffna. He described her as "a woman who made a tremendous impact, especially for females in Jaffna, Sri Lanka" and "an innovator, full of courage and tenacity, and her legacy lives on to this day."

As a child, Sebastian took violin lessons; he would later learn to play guitar, drums and piano, although he has had no formal training in these other musical instruments. After attending St Paul's College, Gilles Plains in 1991, Sebastian attended King's Baptist Grammar School after his family moved to Golden Grove. He then began studies in medical radiation at the University of South Australia, but left to pursue a career in music. He taught vocals at Temple Christian College and other high schools while also working as a recording engineer and studying music technology at the University of Adelaide's Elder Conservatorium.

Sebastian, former member of the Planetshakers band from 2002 to 2005, was a worship leader, sang background vocals, recording albums for Planetshakers Church at Paradise Community Church conferences, and went on to win the first Australian Idol and become a massive star in the country. He attended Paradise Community Church, an Assemblies of God church and one of the largest churches in Australia, and he became one of their main worship singers, after winning Australian Idol he recorded two albums, Adore in 2004 and Set Me Free in 2008.

== Recording career ==
=== 2003–2004: Australian Idol and Just as I Am ===
In May 2003, Sebastian successfully auditioned for Australian Idol, singing Stevie Wonder's "Ribbon in the Sky". He progressed through the Idol series, establishing a strong fanbase and praise from the judges, who often made reference to his afro hairstyle which became a focal point of his image. He was declared the winner on 19 November 2003, and gained a recording contract with BMG, which later merged with Sony. Following his Idol win Sebastian was required to record his debut album in six days, but despite this time restriction the album included three songs co-written by him. He then travelled to the UK to compete in World Idol. Although he impressed the judges, with several suggesting he could win the competition, he finished seventh.

Sebastian's winner's single "Angels Brought Me Here" debuted at number one and was the highest selling single in Australia in 2003, reaching 5× platinum certification. In 2010 it was named the highest selling song of the decade 2000 to 2009, ahead of Anthony Callea's "The Prayer". "Angels Brought Me Here" held the record for being the highest selling single ever released by an Australian act until 2011. Sebastian's debut album Just as I Am was released in December 2003 and also achieved number one. Its first week sales of 163,711 units are the second highest one week sales in Australian chart history, the highest for an Australian act. It eventually reached sales just short of 7× platinum, and is the highest selling album ever released by an Australian Idol contestant. "Angels Brought Me Here" also reached number one in Malaysia, Singapore, the Philippines, Indonesia and New Zealand. Just as I Am reached number three and double platinum certification in New Zealand, with "Angels Brought Me Here" achieving platinum certification there. The second single "All I Need Is You" reached number one and platinum in Australia, and peaked at number five in New Zealand. In early 2004 Sebastian appeared at the Asian MTV Awards, was a guest judge on New Zealand Idol and performed on Indonesian Idol. After a promotional trip to Malaysia in April he travelled to Europe and the US to write for his next album, performing on American Idol while in the US.

=== 2004–2007: Beautiful Life and Closer to the Sun ===
Beautiful Life, Sebastian's second album, had a more R&B edge to it and included songs he co-wrote with Robin Thicke and Brian McKnight and "Forever with You", a duet with American R&B singer Mýa. The lead single "Out with My Baby" debuted at number one in October 2004, and gained platinum certification. Sebastian performed at the 2004 ARIA Music Awards where he received the award for the Highest Selling Single for "Angels Brought Me Here", and the Channel V Oz Artist of the Year Award. He was also nominated for Highest Selling Album for Just as I Am. Beautiful Life peaked at number two and was also certified platinum. Sebastian embarked on a national tour in November, with a second stage from March to June 2005. Sebastian performed at the 20th Anniversary SAFM Sky Show in Adelaide in front of approximately 150,000 people along with Slinkee Minx, one of the largest open-air concerts held in Australia in 2005. Two further singles were released from the album, "Kryptonite" which peaked at number fifteen, and "Oh Oh" at number eleven. In 2005 Sebastian received awards for Favourite Video, Favourite Music Artist, and Favourite Aussie at the Nickelodeon Kid's Choice Awards, and a MTV Video Music Award for "Out with my Baby". He also received a Highest Selling Album ARIA Award nomination for Beautiful Life, and was named as a state finalist in the Young Australian of the Year Awards.

Between May and August 2006, Sebastian appeared as a mentor on the inaugural It Takes Two, in which performers from non-musical fields are teamed with professional singers to perform a duet each week. Sebastian's partner was three-time Australian Olympic swimmer Sarah Ryan and they finished second. During this period Sebastian also recorded his third album Closer to the Sun which was a mix of genres including pop, R&B, soul, pop rock and jazz and mainly co-written with Australian musicians. The lead single "Taller, Stronger, Better" debuted at number three in August 2006, and achieved gold certification. The album peaked at number four and was certified platinum. The second single "Elevator Love" reached number 11 and gold certification. The video featured Jennifer Hawkins as his love interest. Sebastian received an award for most played Urban work for "Oh Oh" at the 2006 APRA Music Awards. "Oh Oh" was also awarded Best Video and Sebastian named Best Male Artist at the Urban Music Awards, and for the second year in succession he received the Fav Aussie award at the Nickelodeon Kids Choice Awards. Closer to the Sun's third single "Cover on My Heart" was released in August 2007, peaking at number thirty two on the ARIA Singles Chart. Closer to the Sun was named Best Album at the 2007 Urban Music Awards and Most Popular Album at the Dolly Teen Choice Awards.

=== 2007–2008: The Memphis Album and Tour ===
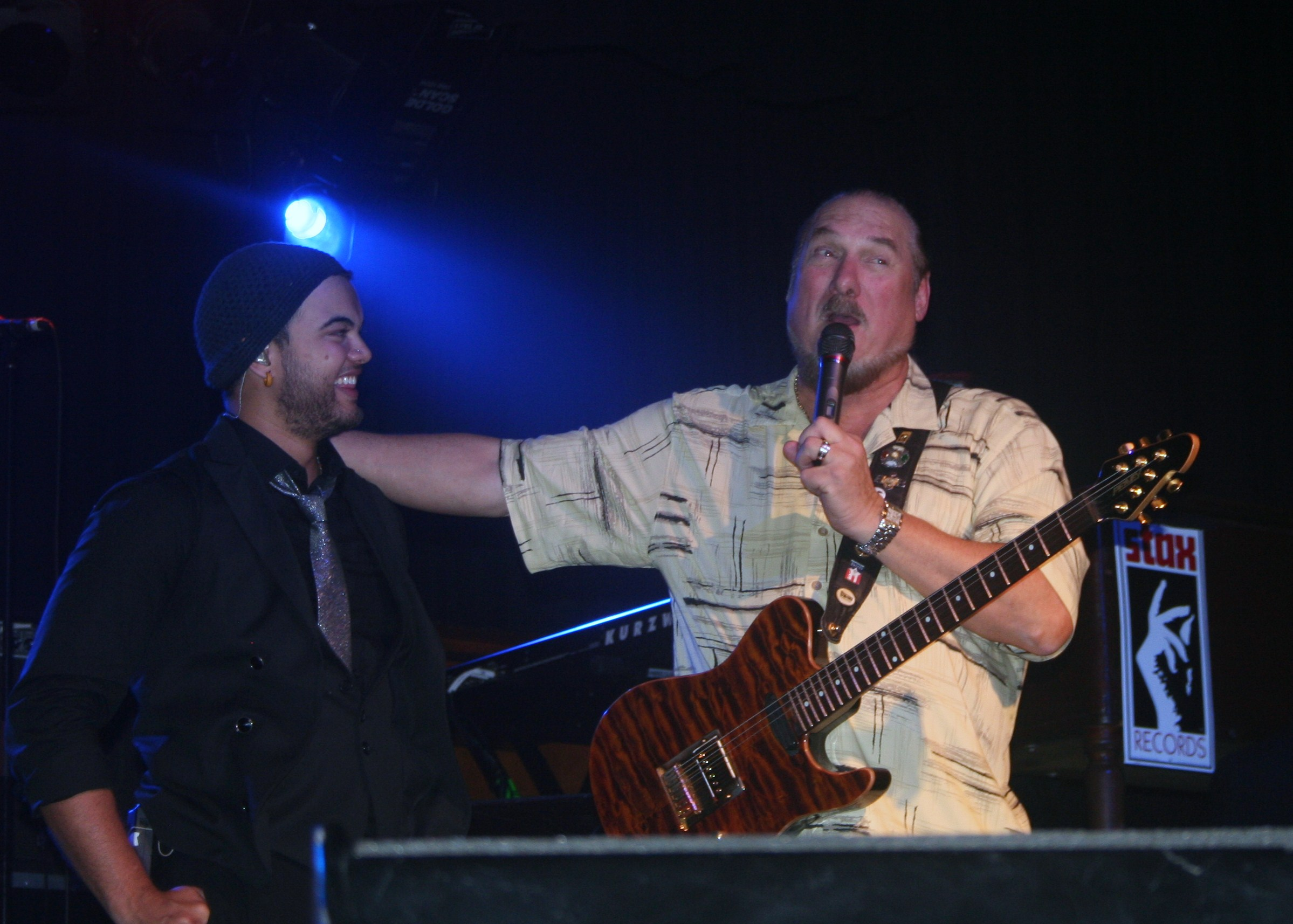
Sebastian and Steve Cropper on stage during The Memphis Tour

In early 2007 it had been announced Sebastian would be recording a tribute album of soul classics in Memphis, Tennessee, with Stax musicians who played on and wrote some of the original songs. The album was recorded at Ardent Studios, Memphis in August 2007, with Steve Cropper, Donald 'Duck' Dunn, and Steve Potts (a.k.a. The MGs), with Lester Snell on keyboards. Cropper also co-produced the album with Sebastian, which was recorded on analogue tape live in the studio. Sebastian wrote about his time in Memphis in a series of blogs for Australian newspapers, "I started recording four days ago with the band members from Booker T and the MGs. And in the four days, we cut 15 tracks. It's been such a great experience to watch these guys work. I mean, they are mostly in their late 60s and have such a wealth of experience." Cropper later spoke on AllMemphisMusic, an online Memphis radio station, "This kid came into Memphis, and just blew everybody's socks off. [...] he just took us by storm." Shortly after Sebastian's return to Australia it was announced that The MGs would tour Australia with him in early 2008. The Memphis Album debuted at number three in November 2007, and was the seventh highest selling Australian artist album of the year. The critically acclaimed album reached double platinum certification in 2008. Memphis Flyer, a weekly alternative newspaper serving the Memphis area wrote a series of articles about Sebastian recording with The MGs. AllMemphisMusic, which specialises in playing music originating from Memphis, began playing The Memphis Album songs in late December 2007. They also had two special programs featuring songs from the album and interviews with some of the people involved in recording it.

"Gimme Some Lovin'"
Excerpt of live performance by Sebastian & the MGs during The Memphis Tour

The MGs came to Australia in February 2008 to be Sebastian's backing band for his national tour. He spoke on radio about what it felt like fronting the MGs, "There were so many moments when I just had to take a step back and think 'This is unbelievable'. Like the history that is behind me, and I'm singing these songs. You know they start playing Dock of the Bay, and the guys that played it are on the stage. You know the guy who wrote the song with Otis Redding is playing guitar." Cropper later spoke on AllMemphisMusic, "hearing him singing our music, which was born and raised and produced and recorded in Memphis, Tennessee. [...] It just filled our hearts." One of the Melbourne concerts was filmed for a live DVD/CD titled The Memphis Tour. Sebastian was nominated for a Helpmann Award for Best Performance in an Australian Contemporary Concert for The Memphis Tour, and was awarded two Australian Club Entertainment Awards, best Original Music Performer and Outstanding Club Performer of the Year. The Memphis Album received a nomination for Highest Selling Album at the 2008 ARIA Awards, his third album to be nominated in this ARIA Awards category. He travelled to the US several times after The Memphis Tour to write for his fifth album, spending time with Cropper in Nashville on these trips.

=== 2008–2010: Like It Like That ===
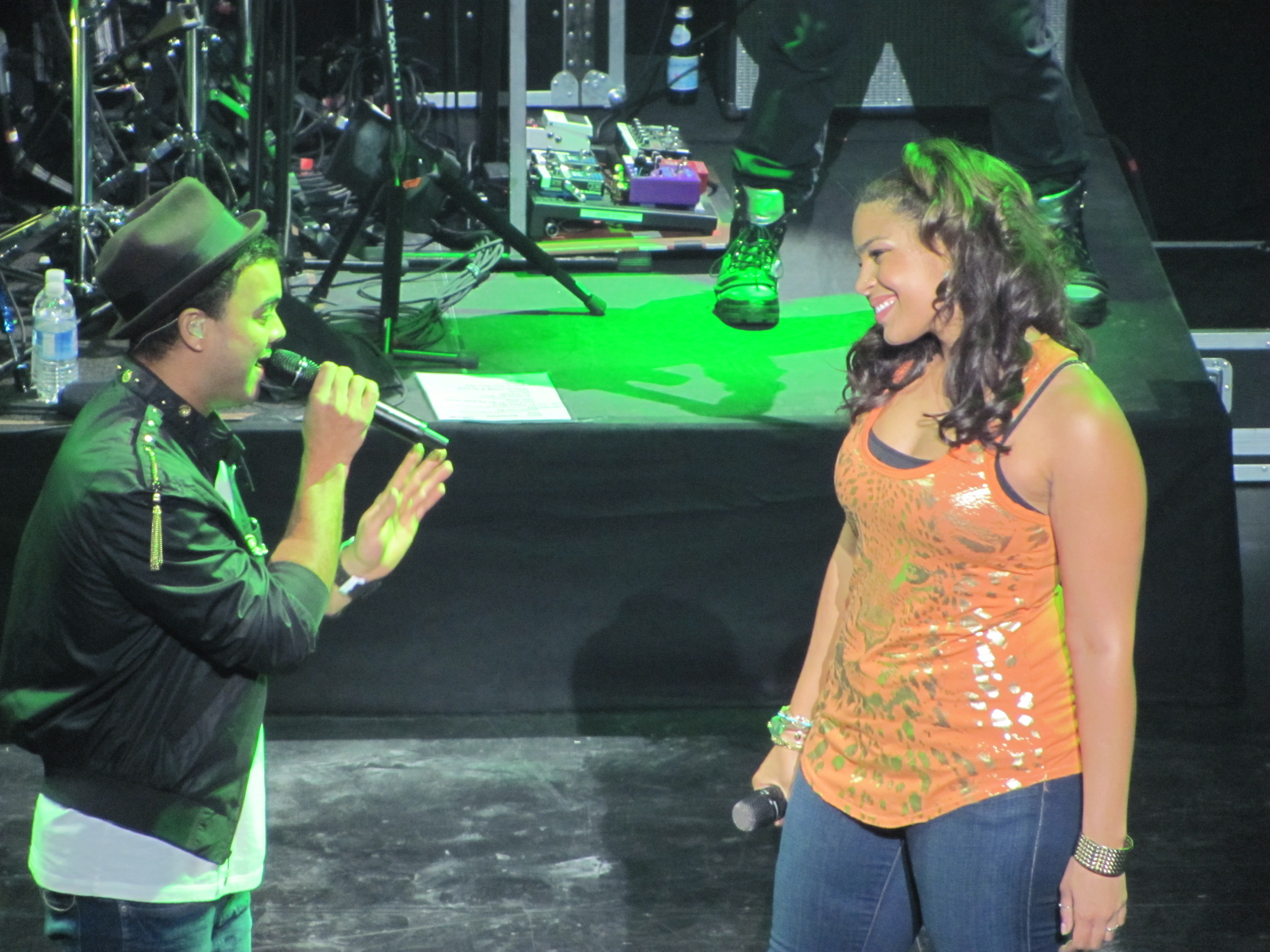
Sebastian & Jordin Sparks performing "Art of Love" at Club Nokia in LA in July 2010

In 2008 Sebastian was signed to release an album in the US, and in November he returned to America to work on it. He recorded songs with John Mayer's band, and John Mayer himself played guitar and sang backing vocals on three of the tracks. He moved to New York in early 2009 to prepare for the release of the US album which was a mix of Memphis soul covers and original songs. He performed showcases at the SXSW Music Festival in Austin Texas, and a residency at the Drom in New York. His song "Like It Like That" was chosen as the theme song for the NBC network's summer promotional campaign. The US release was then delayed due to restructuring of Victor Records, but it was later reaffirmed the album would be released in 2010. "Like It Like That", the title track of Sebastian's fifth album, was released in Australia in August 2009 and reached number one. It was the highest selling Australian artist song in 2009, and achieved 5× platinum certification. Like It Like That, an original soul album with all songs written or co-written by Sebastian, was released in October 2009. It reached number six and was certified platinum.

"Art of Love", a duet with Jordin Sparks, was released as the second single. It peaked at number eight and reached 2× platinum certification. It also charted at number seven in New Zealand, gaining platinum certification there. Two further singles, "All to Myself" and "Never Hold You Down", did not chart in the ARIA top 50. Sebastian toured in Australia during February 2010 and again in June and July. The US album, now identical to the Australian album, was given limited release on the Red Ink label in June 2010, with distribution via iTunes and Barnes & Noble stores. He was chosen as a judge on the 2010 series of Australia's The X-Factor, and to fulfil commitments to X-Factor and also the release of his album in America Sebastian divided his time between Australia and the US during the show. He toured the US West Coast between July and September, including guest performances singing "Art of Love" with Sparks at three of her Battlefield Tour concerts, and also played support for Chicago at a concert in Oregon. Sebastian was nominated for six ARIA Music Awards for Like It Like That. He received nominations for Best Pop Release, Best Male Artist, Most Popular Australian Album and Most Popular Australian Artist, with "Like It Like That" and "Art of Love" receiving nominations for Most Popular Single.

=== 2010–2011: The X Factor and Twenty Ten ===
In 2010, Sebastian was selected as a judge on the Australian series of The X Factor to replace Mark Holden. It is a reality talent competition where the judges also mentor the contestants. The contestants are selected by all the judges at the auditions, and the chosen contestants are divided into four categories, Boys, Girls, Over 25s and Groups. Each judge is given a category and has to reduce their contestants to three. The top three contestants from each category then compete in the live shows with continuing help from their mentors. Sebastian was given Groups in 2010, and was assisted in choosing his top three contestants by Rai Thistlethwayte, lead singer of Thirsty Merc, Snoop Dogg and Usher. Sebastian released a retrospective album titled Twenty Ten in November 2010. The album reached number four on the ARIA Album Chart. It spent twelve weeks in the top ten and was the fifth highest selling Australian artist album of 2010. It was certified double platinum in 2014. It also reached number twenty four on the New Zealand Albums Chart, and has been certified gold there. The album was a two disc release. The first disc had 18 songs from his previous albums and two new tracks, with the second disc containing acoustic versions of ten of the songs. "Who's That Girl" featuring US rapper Eve, was released as the only single. The dance-driven electro R&B song was a departure from Sebastian's previous pop, R&B and soul releases. Eve performed the song with Sebastian on The X Factor Grand Final. "Who's That Girl" reached number one and 6× platinum certification in Australia, and number one and 2× platinum in New Zealand.

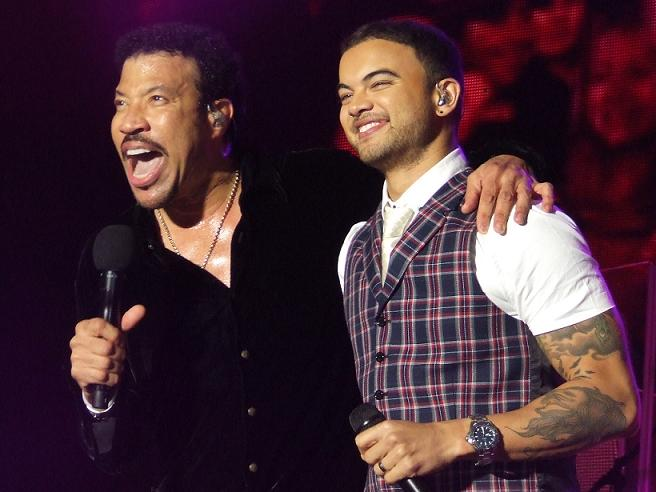
Lionel Richie and Sebastian performing "All Night Long"

With the release of Twenty Ten Sebastian had completed the terms of his original contract with Sony, but re-signed with them for another long-term contract. He supported Boyzone on their 2011 UK tour, and Lionel Richie on his Australian and New Zealand tour. They re-recorded Richie's 1983 single "All Night Long" to raise money for Australian and New Zealand flood and earthquake relief. The track was produced by RedOne. Richie and Sebastian performed the song together at most of the concerts on the Australian leg of the tour. It peaked at number twelve in New Zealand and number twenty six in Australia. Sebastian received the 2011 Australian Club Entertainment Award for best Original Music Performer, and a Mo Award for Rock Performer of the Year. He also won the Highest Selling Single ARIA Award for "Who's That Girl", and received nominations for Single of the Year, Best Pop Release and Most Popular Australian Artist. Sebastian continued as a judge on the 2011 The X Factor. He mentored the Boys and was assisted in choosing his final three by Wynter Gordon and Beyoncé. Reece Mastin who was in his group was the winner.

=== 2011–2013: Armageddon ===
In November 2011 "Don't Worry Be Happy", a pop song Sebastian wrote after encountering an angry motorist in Los Angeles, was released as the lead single of his seventh album Armageddon. It peaked at number five and reached 5× platinum certification. Sebastian spent time in the US in early 2012 working on the album, and "Gold", an uptempo soul track, was released as the second single in May. It peaked at number ten, gaining platinum certification. Sebastian toured nationally during June and July to showcase new songs. In 2012, Sebastian appeared as a judge on The X Factor for a third and final year (until 2015). He was given the Over 25s, and was assisted in selecting his top three contestant by Alicia Keys. His contestant Samantha Jade was the winner. Armageddon's third single "Battle Scars", an R&B ballad featuring a hip hop rap by Lupe Fiasco, was released in August. It debuted at number one, Sebastian's sixth number one single in Australia. He has the most number one singles for an Australian male artist in Australian music history, and is third overall for all Australian acts. Only Kylie Minogue and Delta Goodrem have achieved more. "Battle Scars" was the third-highest selling single in Australia in 2012 and the highest-selling single by an Australian act. It reached 14× platinum in 2023. "Battle Scars" also reached number two and 3× platinum certification in New Zealand.

Fiasco added "Battle Scars" to his fourth album, Food & Liquor II: The Great American Rap Album Pt. 1 in countries other than Australia, and it was released as the fourth single on 28 August 2012. He came to Australia in mid September to promote the single and the release of his album, and he and Sebastian performed "Battle Scars" live for the first time on The X Factor. They also performed the song in America on the Late Show with David Letterman. It was used in the US in the TV promotion for the movie Red Dawn. "Battle Scars" spent 20 weeks on the Billboard Hot 100 chart, peaking at number 71. It also reached number 23 on the Billboard Digital Song Chart and number one on the R&B/Hip-Hop Digital Song Chart. It has been certified 3× platinum in the US for sales of three million. The song also spent 13 weeks in the top ten in Norway, including six weeks at number two, and reached 46 and gold certification in Sweden.

Armageddon was released on 12 October 2012. It reached number one in its seventh week and achieved 3× platinum certification. After only 12 weeks of sales the album was the ninth highest selling album in Australia in 2012, the second highest selling album by an Australian act. Armageddon also charted at number 20 and gained platinum certification in New Zealand. Sebastian was nominated for three 2012 ARIA Awards. He received nominations for Best Pop Release and Best Male Artist for "Battle Scars", and "Don't Worry Be Happy" was nominated for Song of the Year. Sebastian and Fiasco performed "Battle Scars" at the Awards. "Battle Scars" was also nominated for an American NAACP Image Award for Outstanding Duo, Group or Collaboration. The fourth single "Get Along", a song about the harm caused by religious, cultural and racial intolerance reached number five and triple platinum certification. The song also reached number nine and gold certification in New Zealand. In early 2013 Fiasco and Sebastian continued the US promotion of "Battle Scars", performing on Late Night with Jimmy Fallon and Conan. From March to June 2013 he toured Australia with the 47-date Get Along Tour. Sebastian won two 2013 ARIA Awards, Best Pop Release for Armageddon, and Best Live Act for the Get Along Tour. He was also nominated for Album of the Year and Best Male Act for Armageddon and Song of the Year for "Get Along".

=== 2013–2016: Madness and Eurovision Song Contest ===
In October 2013, Sebastian released "Like a Drum", the lead single from his eighth studio album. Debuting at number four, it became his 12th top ten single in Australia, and his tenth to reach the top five. It was certified 5× platinum in Australia. Sebastian opened for Taylor Swift on the Australian leg of her Red Tour. "Like a Drum" was released in the United States, Canada, and Europe in January 2014 through The Cherry Party and RCA Records. The song reached number 20 on the Billboard Dance Club Chart and 49 and platinum certification in Sweden. The second single, "Come Home With Me", reached number 13 on the Aria Singles Chart and platinum certification. The third single, "Mama Ain't Proud" featuring 2 Chainz, peaked at number 17 and reached gold certification. Sebastian received two 2014 ARIA nominations, Best Male Artist for "Come Home With Me" and Song of the Year for "Like a Drum". Sebastian's eighth album, Madness, was released on 21 November 2014 and debuted at number six and was certified gold. The album also reached number 34 in Sweden in 2015.

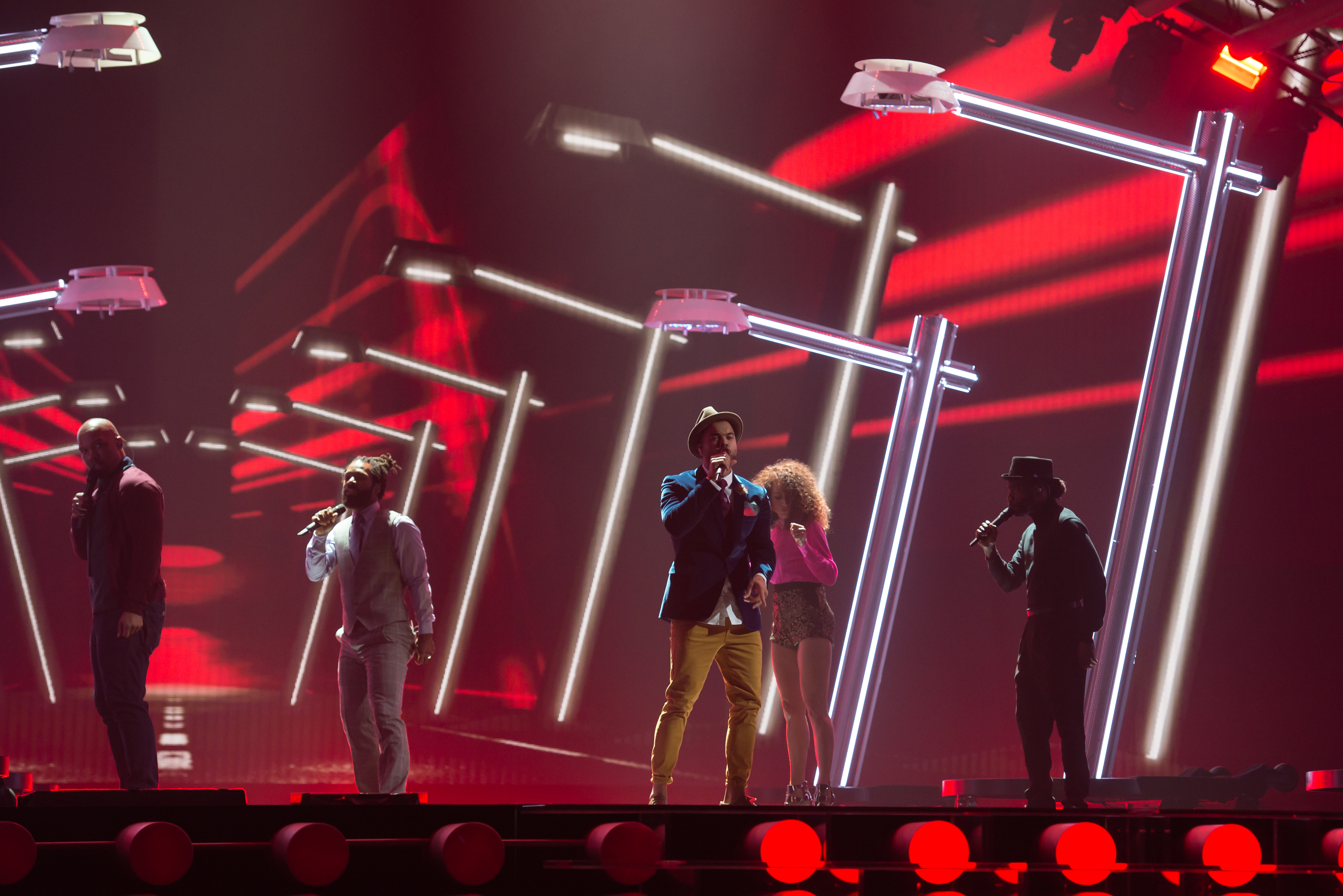
Sebastian performing at the Eurovision Song Contest

The fourth single "Linger" reached number 17 and platinum certification. Sebastian held an arena tour in Australia in February 2015 to support the album release. "Like a Drum" received 2015 APRA nominations for Pop Work of the Year and Most Played Australian Work. Sebastian was chosen as the Australian entrant in the Eurovision Song Contest 2015, making him the first artist to represent Australia in the competition. He performed the song "Tonight Again", and placed fifth in the competition overall. "Tonight Again" debuted at number 12 in Australia. It also charted at number five in Iceland, 16 in Austria, 22 in Sweden and reached the top 50 of the German and Swiss charts. It achieved gold certification in Sweden. Sebastian toured in Europe in August and September, performing in Sweden, Germany, Norway and The Netherlands. He was nominated for 2015 ARIA Award for Best Male Artist for "Tonight Again". He returned to the judging panel of the Australian version of The X Factor after a two-year absence to replace Redfoo. In November 2015 he released "Black & Blue". The song reached number 17, and achieved platinum certification. In January and February 2016 he held a 35 date Australian regional tour. Sebastian received 2016 ARIA Award nominations for Best Male Artist and Best Video for "Black & Blue".

=== 2016–2017: Part 1 EP and Conscious ===
In late 2016, Sebastian released two singles, "Candle", which peaked at 59, and "Set in Stone", which reached number 11 and has been certified double platinum. Sebastian released Part 1 EP in December 2016. It was released digitally on 2 December, and peaked at number 31 on the ARIA Album Chart. The physical cd was released on 16 December. A third single, "Mind On You", did not chart. In March and April 2017 Sebastian toured the Australian eastern states to preview songs from his next album. In September 2017, Sebastian released the single "High On Me" and announced his album Conscious would be released on 3 November 2017. He also announced a November tour of the mainland capital cities and Newcastle. "Keep Me Coming Back" and "Vesuvius" were released as promotional singles from Conscious, ahead of the album release. It was also confirmed "Set in Stone" was also included in the album. "Set in Stone" was nominated for an ARIA Award for Song of the Year. "Bloodstone", the second official single peaked at number 59 and was certified platinum, with Conscious debuting at number four.

=== 2018–2022: T.R.U.T.H. ===
On 4 October 2018, Sebastian released "Before I Go", the lead single from his tenth album, T.R.U.T.H. The single peaked at number 43 and was certified 2× platinum. "Before I Go" also reached number 41 and platinum certification in the Netherlands. Sebastian was a coach on The Voice Australia from 2019 to 2024, and was replaced by Richard Marx for the 2025 season. Sebastian was made a Member of the Order of Australia (AM) in the 2019 Queen's Birthday Honours in recognition of his "significant service to the music industry and charitable initiatives". In June 2019 he released the single "Choir", reached number seven, and has been certified 6× platinum. Sebastian toured Australia in September and October with his Ridin' With You Tour. On 1 October 2019, it was announced that Sebastian would host the ARIA Music Awards of 2019. He received 2019 ARIA Award nominations for Best Male Artist and Best Pop Release, and won for Best Video and Song of the Year for "Choir".

The single "Standing with You" was released in June 2020 and peaked at number ten, Sebastian's 14th top ten single in Australia. It has reached 2× platinum certification. In October 2020, Sebastian released his tenth album T.R.U.T.H., which debuted at number one on the ARIA charts, becoming Sebastian's third career ARIA number one album. The album has been certified platinum Sebastian was nominated for Best Male Artist for "Standing With You" at the 2020 ARIA Music Awards, and the song won the ARIA Award for Best Video.

=== 2023–present : 100 Times Around the Sun ===
In August 2023, Sebastian announced the release of "I Choose Good"; the first new music in three years. In 2024 he was inducted into the South Australian Music Hall of Fame at the South Australian Music Awards. In 2025 Sebastian made his acting debut in the film Hindi Vindi. 100 Times Around the Sun, his eleventh album, was released in August 2025, and debuted at number two. All Sebastian's albums have reached the top ten in Australia, with nine peaking inside the top five, including three number ones. 100 Times Around the Sun also charted at number 37 in New Zealand. Sebastian received awards for Most Peformed Pop Work and Most Performed Australian Work for the song "Maybe" at the 2026 APRA Awards. He toured nationally in April and May 2026 to promote the album. On 25 May 2026, a Regional Tour was announced.

== Artistry ==
=== Musical style and influences ===
Sebastian cites a number of musicians as his musical influences, including Sam Cooke, Otis Redding, Donny Hathaway, Stevie Wonder, Chicago, and Boyz II Men. His music has crossed many genres, including pop, R&B, funk, smokey soul, gospel, jazz, pop rock, Memphis soul covers, '60s soul/pop and electro R&B. While Sebastian's first three albums showed elements of soul, it was The Memphis Album which consolidated his reputation as a soul musician. Reviewers almost unanimously agreed he had captured the spirit and essence of the Memphis soul classics. It was the critical and public reception for The Memphis Album which gave Sebastian the confidence to stay with the soul genre for his fifth album, Like It Like That. In an interview with The Age he said he was told early in his career, "If you self-indulge and just do what you're into, you're going to corner your market. Soul music isn't big here." but "the most comfortable I've ever felt in the studio was during The Memphis Album. And the success of that prompted me to make a record like this one. Because I realised that this isn't obscure music."

The Daily Telegraph music editor Kathy McCabe said: "Sometimes it takes four records, with a detour into 'concepts' covers territory to find where you fit. Sebastian has found his niche with Like It Like That, which expertly balances the line between radio friendly pop and classic soul." Paul Cashmere from Undercover wrote: "By covering the classics on The Memphis Album Guy Sebastian discovered Guy Sebastian. [...] If The Memphis Album was Guy's initiation into becoming a Soul Man then Like It Like That is the graduation." In an interview for the release of his seventh album Armageddon, Sebastian spoke of how much The Memphis Album still influences his music: "I got to work with some people who were instrumental in shaping the careers of artists who heavily influence me. Artists like Otis Redding, Sam & Dave and Sam Cooke. Being entrenched in that sort of environment really caused me to go 'You know what dude. Do what you want to do. Do what comes natural to you'. [...] From that Memphis thing a few years ago it's always going to start with me being true to who I want to be and what I enjoy singing."

=== Songwriting and production ===
Sebastian began writing songs before entering Australian Idol. "All I Need Is You", the second single from his debut album Just as I Am, was written when he was a teenager, and he fine-tuned during his time on Idol. He also wrote gospel songs for his church during his teenage years. One of them, "Adore", was included in their 2004 album Paradise Live: Adore. Sebastian wrote or co-wrote most of the songs on his albums Beautiful Life and Closer to the Sun, and all the tracks on his albums Like It Like That and Armageddon. In an article in The Daily Telegraph, Kathy McCabe said of his songwriting skills, "Sebastian has matured into a genuine hitmaker, his gift with melody so finely-honed he can pretty much punch out a catchy number in his sleep." Jamie Horne wrote in The Border Mail, "The inaugural winner's longevity [...] can be attributed to the fact that he's an accomplished musician and songwriter" and AllMusic reviewer Jon O'Brien said, "it's a testament to his vocal abilities and songwriting skills that, unlike many of his fellow winners, he's remained popular enough to see out his rather ambitious Sony contract [...] a subtle and natural progression with each album, explains why he's managed to survive once the show's publicity machine died down."

In 2008 "Receive the Power", a gospel song written by Sebastian and Gary Pinto, was chosen as the official anthem for the Roman Catholic Church's XXIII World Youth Day. "Art of Love", co-written by Adam Reilly, was shortlisted for the APRA Song of the Year in 2010. "All to Myself", written with Carl Dimataga, and "Who's That Girl" were shortlisted for the 2011 APRA Song of the Year, with "Who's That Girl" winning the APRA Award for Urban Work of the Year. "Don't Worry Be Happy" was shortlisted for the 2012 APRA Song of the Year. "Battle Scars" won the R&B/Hip category in the 2013 International Songwriting Competition. "Get Along" was a finalist in the Pop/Top 40 category, and was awarded an honourable mention. "Get Along" was also one of the final five nominees for the 2013 APRA Song of the Year. "Set in Stone" was shortlisted for the 2017 APRA Song of the Year, and "Black & Blue" was nominated for Pop Work of the Year.

Sebastian has a worldwide, long-term publishing agreement with Universal Music Publishing. He has written songs for other artists, including co-writing "Dot Com", a song performed by Usher on Rhythm City Volume One: Caught Up. He also has an interest in production and co-produced The Memphis Album with Steve Cropper. He has his own recording studio, Cooper Lane Studio, where he produces and engineers some of his music, and which is also used by other musicians. He produced a song called "Think of Me" for 2009 Australian Idol Stan Walker's debut album, as well as playing most of the musical instruments on the track.

== Notable performances ==
On World Youth Day, July 2008, "Receive the Power", a song written by Sebastian and Gary Pinto, was chosen as the official anthem for the Roman Catholic Church's XXIII World Youth Day (WYD08) held in Sydney in 2008. The song also features the vocals of Paulini Curuenavuli, who competed with Sebastian on the first season of Australian Idol. "Receive the Power" was released in English and also an international version with the chorus in English and verses in Italian, Spanish and French. It was used extensively throughout the six days of World Youth Day in July 2008, and also in the television coverage which went around the world. Sebastian and Curuenavuli performed both the English and International versions at the final Mass at Randwick Race Course on 20 July which was attended by 400,000 people. They also performed "Receive the Power" at the Pope's Farewell.

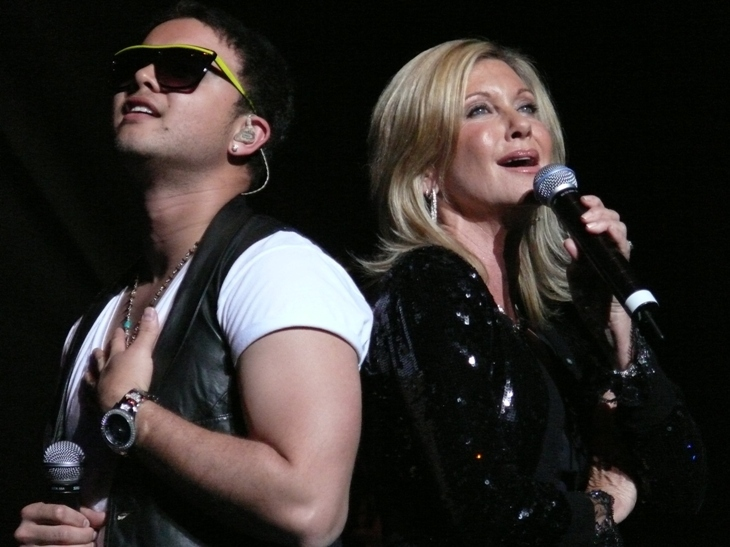
Guy Sebastian and Olivia Newton-John performing "Summer Nights" at the Olivia Newton-John & Friends Concert

Olivia Newton-John & Friends Concert, September 2008: This concert was held at the State Theatre in Sydney to raise funds for Newton-John's Cancer and Wellness Centre Appeal. Sebastian was chosen to sing a duet with Newton-John. They sang her iconic hit from Grease, "Summer Nights".

Oscar Haven – Los Angeles, February 2009: Sebastian was a headline act at an Oscar Haven party hosted by Stardust Pictures and Jamie Kennedy. Haven is held during Oscar week and invitees include Film Academy nominees as well as actors and insiders from film, television and music industries.

9th Annual NON-COMMvention – Philadelphia, May 2009: Sebastian performed with Steve Cropper and David Ryan Harris at the 9th Annual NON-COMMvention. The event is the premier annual conference for North America's non-commercial Triple A radio.

Australian launch of Michael Jackson's This Is It DVD, March 2010: Sebastian and Delta Goodrem were chosen by the Jackson estate to perform at the Australian launch of This Is It. They performed "Earth Song". The invitation only event was attended by the film's director Kenny Ortega and Jackson's brother Jackie Jackson

Oprah Winfrey's official welcome to Sydney and wrap up party, December 2010: Sebastian was the guest performer at an event at Sydney's Botanical Gardens to officially welcome Oprah Winfrey and her American audience members to Australia. Winfrey was in Australia to record two of her shows at the Sydney Opera House. Sebastian sang for Winfrey a second time when she requested he perform at her private crew wrap-up party.

G'Day USA, January 2011 and 2012: G'Day USA is an annual two-week program designed to showcase Australian business capabilities, and is the largest foreign country promotion held in the US. Sebastian and the Qantas Choir were the entertainers at the 2011 Black Tie Gala in Los Angeles. Sebastian performed his own songs and also a medley of Bee Gees songs prior to Barry Gibb being honoured for excellence in Music at the event. During G'Day USA 2012 he performed at the American Australian Association Black Tie Gala in New York and the Australian American Chamber of Commerce Gala in Houston, Texas.

Grammy week – Los Angeles, February 2011: During Grammy week each year there are many events leading up to the Grammy Awards night. Sebastian was invited to perform at two of these events in 2011. He performed at The Black Eyed Peas Peapod Benefit Concert which was attended by musicians, DJ's, philanthropists, Hollywood celebrities and industry executives. He also performed at the Roots Pre Grammy Jam Session. The Roots are a Grammy Award winning hip hop and neo soul American band. During Grammy week they hold a jam session and invite other musicians to perform with them. Their 2011 jam session was hosted by Jimmy Fallon and other performers included Sara Bareilles, Lalah Hathaway, Booker T. Jones and Chaka Khan.

CHOGM 2011 Opening Ceremony – Perth, Western Australia October 2011: Sebastian performed "Agents of Change", a song written by him especially for the event, at the opening ceremony of the biannual Commonwealth Heads of Government Meeting (CHOGM). In attendance at the ceremony were Queen Elizabeth II, Prime Minister Julia Gillard, the Secretary-General of the Commonwealth and heads of government from all 53 Commonwealth nations.

The GRAMMY Foundation's 15th Annual Music Preservation Project – Los Angeles, February 2013: Held each year during Grammy Week, in 2013 the event was "Play It Forward: A Celebration Of Music's Evolution And Influencers". It explored the history of legendary influencers in music, the music they inspired and their impact on the American cultural landscape. Lupe Fiasco and Sebastian were chosen to perform "Battle Scars" as the finale of the concert. Other performers included Dionne Warwick, LeAnn Rimes and Ed Sheeran.

== Court ==
In May 2022, Sebastian started a court case against his former manager, Titus Day, accused of embezzling $900,000. Several days into the trial, District Court of New South Wales Judge Peter Zahra died after suffering a stroke before the court session on Friday 6 May. On Monday 9 May, Judge James Bennett addressed the court and announced his colleague's death and that the case would resume before another judge a week later. In June, Day was found guilty of having embezzled Sebastian of $620,000. Upon appeal, a retrial was ordered and, in July 2025, a jury acquitted Day of four charges and remained hung on the remaining allegations. The case was dismissed, though a civil trial is expected to be heard by the Federal Court.

== Personal life ==
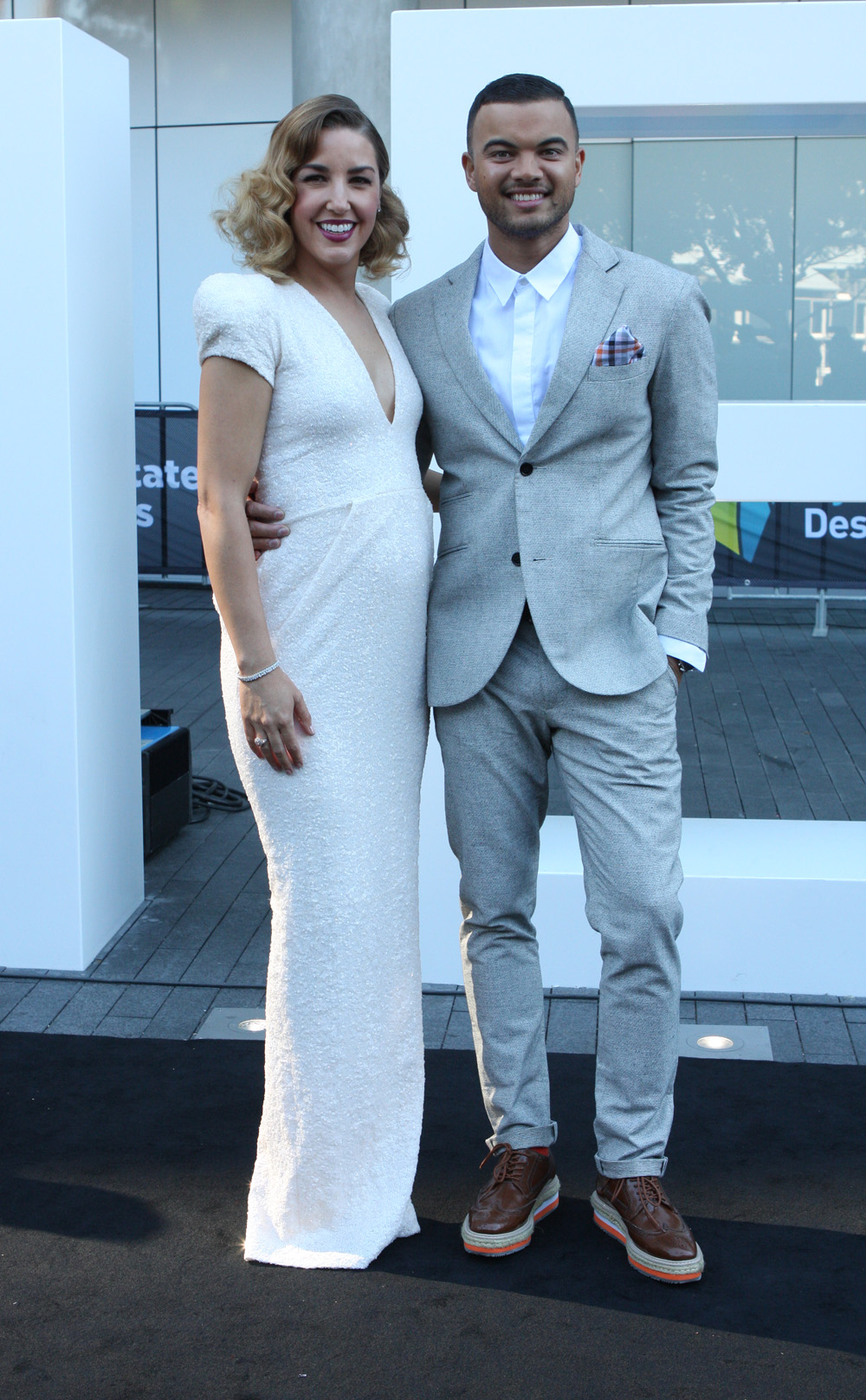
Jules and Guy Sebastian, ARIA Awards, December 2013

In late 2007, after eight years of courtship, Sebastian and girlfriend Jules Egan became engaged. They were married in Manly, New South Wales, on 17 May 2008. They have two sons, born on 3 March 2012 and 17 April 2014.

== Charitable work ==
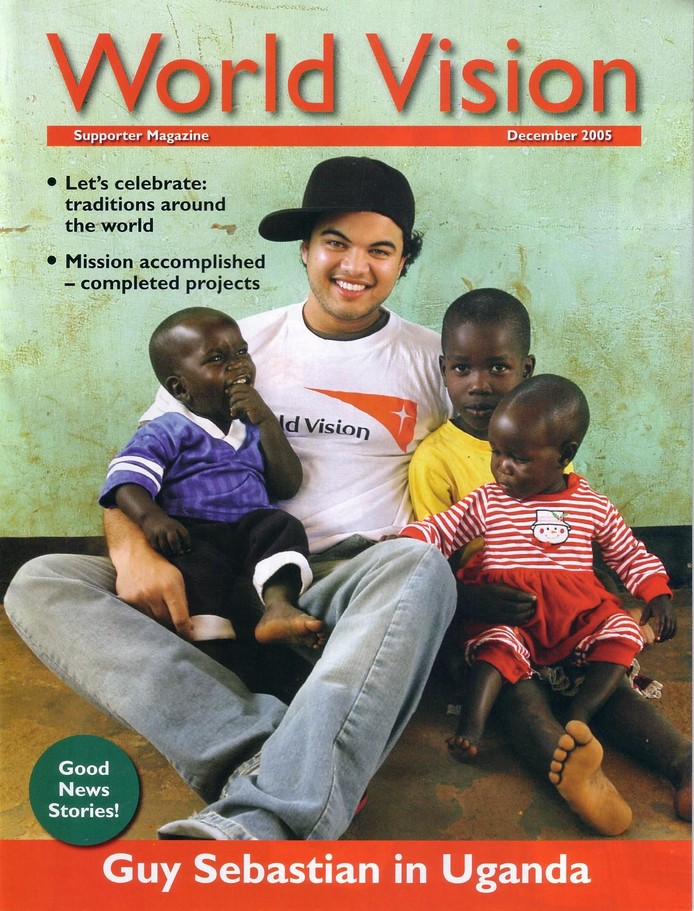
World Vision Australia Magazine. Dec 2005

Throughout his career, Sebastian has had a strong commitment to charity. He has been an ambassador for the Ronald McDonald House charities, and is currently an ambassador for the Australian Red Cross and Golden Stave, which is the Australian music and entertainment industry's charity fund raising organisation. He is also an ambassador for World Vision Australia, and in 2005 he travelled to Uganda to film a World Vision documentary "An Idol in Africa" for a Network Ten television special. Sebastian has continued his work with World Vision, supporting the Child Rescue program and the 40 Hour Famine. He has also been involved in the Make Poverty History coalition of which World Vision is a part. In 2008 he was presented with the Extreme Inspiration Award at the Dolly Teen Choice Awards for his continuing support of World Vision. Sebastian is also strongly committed to the Sony Foundation, which raises funds to help young Australians facing homelessness, severe illness, disability and isolation. In 2009 the Sony CEO Denis Handlin said: "Every time I've asked Guy to get involved with the Sony Foundation through charity he's been completely proactive. Guy's been such a great ambassador for that, and a lot of it is under the radar but it just tells you so much about what a decent human being he is."

Sebastian contributes to many other charitable projects. In 2005 he was the guest performer on the annual Indian Pacific Outback Christmas Journey which raises money for the Royal Flying Doctor's Service. In 2008 he performed a series of 11 concerts with the Australian Army Band to raise funds for Legacy. Legacy is a voluntary organisation which supports the families of deceased veterans. The concerts were held in theatre venues around Australia and the funds raised went to the local Legacy branch in the area each concert was held. Sebastian regularly performs at other fundraising events including Brisbane radio station B105's Christmas appeal for the Royal Children's Hospital, and Perth's annual Telethon. He also donates his time to annual Christmas carol events such as Carols in the Domain, Vision Australia's Carols by Candlelight, and Brisbane's Carols in the City. His songs are frequently featured on charity CDs including the Salvation Army Christmas fundraising CDs, The Spirit of Christmas albums. Sebastian also makes unofficial appearances at hospitals several times a year. Sebastian was an ambassador for the 2020 MEN-tality project for Beyond Blue shot by Peter Brew-Bevan, alongside Osher Gunsberg, Rodger Corser and Andrew Tierney. In 2013, Sebastian and his wife Jules formed The Sebastian Foundation.

In 2026, Sebastian offere to donate to Chundikuli Girls' College in Jaffna, Sri Lanka on the television program Who Do You Think You Are? after discovering that he is a cousin of the college's former principal, Evangeline Thillayampalam.

== Discography ==
Studio albums

- Just as I Am (2003)
- Beautiful Life (2004)
- Closer to the Sun (2006)
- The Memphis Album (2007)
- Like it Like That (2009)
- Armageddon (2012)
- Madness (2014)
- Conscious (2017)
- T.R.U.T.H. (2020)
- 100 Times Around the Sun (2025)

Compilation albums

- Twenty Ten

== Awards and nominations ==
Sebastian has been nominated for numerous awards during his career, winning many of them. These awards and nominations include ARIA Awards, ARIA No. 1 Chart Awards, APRA Awards, Australian Club Entertainment Awards, Nickelodeon Kids Choice Awards, Urban Music Awards, and a Channel V Artist of the Year Award.

== Tours ==
- 2004–05: Beautiful Life Tour
- 2007: Closer to the Sun Tour
- 2007: Acoustic Tour
- 2008: The Memphis Tour
- 2009: Live & By Request Tour
- 2010: Like It Like That Tour
- 2010: Bring Yourself Tour
- 2010: Like It Like That Tour (USA)
- 2012: Armageddon tour
- 2013: Get Along Tour
- 2015: Madness Tour
- 2015: Madness European Tour
- 2016: You...Me...Us Tour
- 2017: Sub-Conscious Tour
- 2017: Conscious Tour
- 2018: Then and Now Tour
- 2019: Ridin' With You Tour.
- 2022: T.R.U.T.H. Tour
- 2022: T.R.U.T.H. on the East Side Tour
- 2026: 100 Times Around the Sun Tour
- 2026: 100 X Around Australia Tour

Joint tours

- 2004: Australian Idol in Concert
- 2007: Guy & the Australian Philharmonic Orchestra
- 2008: Army in Concert with Guy Sebastian

Support tours

- 2011: Boyzone Tour (United Kingdom)
- 2011: Lionel Richie Tour (Australia and New Zealand)
- 2013: Red Tour (Australia)
- 2017: Love Always Tour (United Kingdom)

== See also ==
- List of best-selling singles in Australia
- List of artists who reached number one on the Australian singles chart

Awards and achievements
Preceded by None; New television show	Australian Idol winner Season 1 (2003)	Succeeded by Casey Donovan
Preceded by none (Debut entry)	Australia in the Eurovision Song Contest; 2015	Succeeded by Dami Im with "Sound of Silence"
