= Like It Like That (Guy Sebastian song) =

Single by Guy Sebastian

from the album Like It Like That
- Released: 13 August 2009
- Recorded: 2009
- Genre: Pop, soul
- Length: 3:48 (radio edit); 4:01 (album version)
- Label: Sony Music
- Songwriters: Guy Sebastian, David Ryan Harris, Sean Hurley
- Producers: David Ryan Harris, Fredro

Guy Sebastian singles chronology
"Cover on My Heart" (2007)	"Like It Like That" (2009)	"Art of Love" featuring Jordin Sparks" (2009)

Audio sample
- "Like It Like That": file; help

External videos
- Official "Like It Like That" music video

"Like It Like That" is the title track and first single from Australian pop, R&B and soul singer-songwriter Guy Sebastian's fifth album Like It Like That. It was co-written by Sebastian, David Ryan Harris and Sean Hurley. "Like It Like That" was released on 13 August 2009 and peaked at number one on the ARIA singles chart. It was Sebastian's fourth of six number one singles in Australia. It was the highest selling Australian artist single and sixth highest selling single overall in Australia in 2009. It received a 2010 ARIA Music Award nomination for Most Popular Australian Single. In 2023 the song reached 5× platinum certification. "Like It Like That" also charted in New Zealand in 2011, peaking at number 30 and gaining gold certification there.

== Background ==
"Like It Like That" is a song with 1960s soul and pop influences and was co-written by Sebastian, Sean Hurley and David Ryan Harris, who has worked with the likes of John Mayer, Mariah Carey and the Neville Brothers. It was produced by Harris and Fredro. The song was not originally slated to be released as the first single from the album, but Sebastian said in an interview with Paul Cashmere of Undercover at the SXSW Music Festival in Texas in early 2009 that the feedback he had received from live performances had made it a strong contender as the lead single. He said, "The more we play "Like It Like That" when I play it live a lot of people are drawn to it. [...] It's simple really. The chorus says 'Hey oh, do you like it like that, I'm the only one who can love you like that' and it repeats. It's so easy, it's just a fun song".

Prior to its release in Australia "Like It Like That" was chosen as the theme song for the US NBC network's summer promotional campaign. In an interview in late 2009 Sebastian said "Like It Like That" originally had a much more organic sound and didn't really have a modern edge. It was produced to go on the US album, as the record company wanted the album to have a similar sound as The Memphis Album for the US market, but Sebastian did not feel that type of production was right for Australia. He said, "I ended up going back and reproducing everything which was quite a nightmare. I mean "Like It Like That" for example was really old school, like real drums, real organic, so we reproduced that and we got it to sound a little more modern, in your face I guess, the way it is now". In 2010 after being presented with an award by Sony for "Like It Like That" he said, "I think 'Like It Like That' is the most I've ever sat back and gone 'I can't believe this is my life. I can't believe it's happening and radio's all over it'. It blew my mind."

== Release and promotion ==
"Like It Like That" was sent to radio on 24 July 2009, three weeks before it was released for sale. It was quickly picked up by radio stations and was number one in national radioplay for five weeks. In January 2011 the Phonographic Performance Company of Australia announced it was radio's most played song for the year. The results were calculated from radio broadcast logs from 1 July 2009 to 30 June 2010. Sebastian performed "Like It Like That" on the grand final of Seven Network's Dancing with the Stars in August 2009, and at Channel 7's Perth Telethon in October. Sebastian also performed the song at instore promotional appearances in New South Wales and South Australia during the album release week in late October. "Like It Like That" was used extensively by Channel 7 for their program promotions during late 2009 and early 2010. Sebastian sang a gospel-inspired reworked version of the song as the closing act at the 2010 ARIA Awards. He had received an ARIA nomination for Most Popular Australian Single for "Like It Like That" and five other nominations including Best Male Artist and Best Pop release for the album.

== Music video ==
The music video was filmed at Sydney's Q Bar. Sebastian portrays a musician performing at a hotel bar, who becomes attracted to a girl in the crowd. Lyndsey Rodrigues plays Sebastian's love interest in the video, and also making an appearance as a bartender is Jason Stevens, retired NSW rugby league player and now rugby league writer. The video was the second highest viewed Australian music clip on YouTube in 2009.

== Critical reception ==
"Like It Like That" received favourable reviews. Tim Byron from The Vine wrote that it was "an excellent fluffy pop song, with a melody that suited his voice, and surprisingly interesting sounds and musical ideas in the verses and coda." A reviewer for TV Central said it was "possibly one of Sebastian's greatest singles ever. Its foundations of soul and the accompanying surf guitar makes for a truly addictive 4 minutes." The Music Network named "Like It Like That" as one of the best songs released in 2009, writing, "Idol alumni Guy Sebastian flooded the market with this upbeat song midway through the year, and it is hard to deny its infectious chorus, and summer feel." Rave Magazine placed it fourth on its list of the best songs of 2009, saying, "What's a list without a controversial entry [...] listen to the last 50 seconds of layered backing vocals, horns and his band to hear a quality of pop that's a million miles from any TV talent show." Jon O'Brien from AllMusic called the song "brilliant Brill Building pop", and in the Herald Sun Bryan Patterson wrote, "I may sue Guy Sebastian. His insanely catchy little track, with its stupidly seductive flute, guitars and choruses, has been playing over and over in my head for days."

== Commercial performance ==
"Like It Like That" debuted at number six on the ARIA singles chart, and reached number one in its fourth week of release, a position it held for two weeks. The song spent twenty five weeks in the top 50 of the ARIA Singles chart, including twelve weeks in the top ten. The single was Sebastian's fourth of six number one singles in Australia. Sebastian is the only Australian male artist to achieve six number one singles, and is third overall for all Australian acts. Only Delta Goodrem and Kylie Minogue have achieved more. "Like It Like That" was the highest selling Australian artist single of 2009, and the sixth highest seller overall. In January 2010 ARIA released information on the highest selling songs in Australia in the previous decade. "Like It Like That" placed at number 29, the sixth highest selling Australian artist song, with Sebastian's first single "Angels Brought Me Here" being named the highest selling song of the decade. Sebastian was one of only two Australian artists with more than one song in the top 100 songs. In 2023 "Like it Like That" reached 5× platinum certification.

== Track listing ==
CD single
No.	Title	Length
1.	"Like It Like That" (radio edit)	3:48

Digital EP
No.	Title	Length
1.	"Like It Like That" (radio edit)	3:48
2.	"Only Girl in Town"	3:44
3.	"Private Number"	3:20

== Credits and personnel ==
Credits taken from Like It Like That album liner notes.

- Writers – Guy Sebastian, David Ryan Harris, Sean Hurley, Holly Trundle
- Lead vocals – Guy Sebastian
- Background vocals – David Ryan Harris, CC White
- Guitar – Joshua Lopez,
- Bass – Sean Hurley
- Farlisa organ and piano – Zac Rae
- Drums – JJ Johnson
- Trumpet – Jumaane Smith
- Tenor saxophone – Bob Reynolds
- Baritone saxophone – David Moyer
- Production – David Ryan Harris, Fredrik Odesjo, Andreas Levander
- Engineering – Billy Bush
- Mixing – Fredrik Odesjo, Rob Kinelski

== Charts ==
Chart (2009–10)	Peak position
Australia (ARIA)	1
New Zealand (Recorded Music NZ)	30

=== Year-end charts ===
Chart (2009)	Position
Australia (ARIA)	6
Australian Artist (ARIA)	1
Chart (2010)	Position
Australian Artist (ARIA)	33

=== Decade-end charts ===
Chart (2000–2009)	Position
Australia (ARIA)	29
Australian Artist (ARIA)	6

== Certifications ==
Region	Certification	Certified units/sales
Australia (ARIA)	5× Platinum	350,000^{‡}
New Zealand (RMNZ)	Gold	7,500^{*}
^{*} Sales figures based on certification alone.^{‡} Sales+streaming figures based on certification alone.
