= Closer to the Sun (Guy Sebastian album) =

Studio album by Guy Sebastian
- Released: 28 October 2006
- Recorded: 2006
- Label: Sony BMG

Guy Sebastian chronology
Beautiful Life (2004)	Closer to the Sun (2006)	The Memphis Album (2007)

Singles from Closer to the Sun
- 1. "Taller, Stronger, Better" Released: 16 September 2006; 2. "Elevator Love" Released: 2 December 2006; 3. "Cover on My Heart" Released: 28 July 2007

Closer to the Sun is the third studio album by Australian singer-songwriter Guy Sebastian, released on 28 October 2006 by Sony BMG Australia. Early news hinted that the album would feature a little bit of rock, soul, funk and pop genres. Some tracks that appear on the album were premiered at the free concert at Federation Square on 27 September 2006. The album debuted at number four on 5 November 2006 and achieved Gold status (shipments in excess of 35,000) in its second week (12 November 2006). It has since been credited Platinum (70,000 units). The album exited the Top 50 Albums Chart on 8 January 2007 and moved outside the Top 100 on 26 February 2007.

Singles released from the album were "Taller, Stronger, Better", "Elevator Love" and "Cover on My Heart".

== Track listing ==
1. "Elevator Love" (Guy Sebastian, Jarrad Rogers)
2. "Out of Place" (Guy Sebastian, David Ryan Harris)
3. "Can't Stop a River" (Peter Gordeno, Seal (musician)
4. "Trade This Love" (Guy Sebastian, Carl Dimataga, Fitzgerald Scott)
5. "Closer to the Sun" (Guy Sebastian, Gary Pinto, Carl Dimataga)
6. "Cover on My Heart" (Guy Sebastian, Anders Bagge, Peer Åström)
7. "I'm Gon Getcha" (Guy Sebastian, Fredrik "Fredro Odesjo, Matts Berntoft, Machel Montano)
8. "Unbreakable" (Reed Vertelney, Tony Bruno, Lindy Robbins)
9. "Taller, Stronger, Better" (Guy Sebastian, Phil Turcio, Gary Pinto)
10. "Boyfriend" (Guy Sebastian, David Ryan Harris)
11. "Stars Collide" (Guy Sebastian, Gary Clark)
12. "Takin' Me Over" (Guy Sebastian, Jarrad Rogers)
13. "Be Mine" (Guy Sebastian, Carl Dimataga, Fitzgerald Scott)
14. "Never Ever Said Goodbye" (Guy Sebastian, Carl Dimataga) – iTunes Music Store (Australia) Exclusive

== Charts ==
=== Weekly charts ===
Chart (2006)	Peak position
Australian Albums (ARIA)	4

=== Year-end charts ===
Chart (2006)	Position
Australian Albums Chart	65
Australian Artist Albums Chart	24

== Certification ==
Region	Certification	Certified units/sales
Australia (ARIA)	Platinum	70,000^{^}
^{^} Shipments figures based on certification alone.

== Release history ==
Region	Date	Format(s)	Label	Catalog	Ref.
Australia	28 October 2006	CD; digital download	Sony BMG	88697012072	
