= Taller, Stronger, Better =

Single by Guy Sebastian

from the album Closer to the Sun
- Released: 16 September 2006
- Genre: Pop
- Length: 3:44
- Label: Sony BMG
- Songwriter(s): Guy Sebastian, Phil Turcio, Gary Pinto

Guy Sebastian singles chronology
| "Oh Oh" (2005) | "Taller, Stronger, Better" (2006) | "Elevator Love" (2006) |

"Taller, Stronger, Better" is a song written by Guy Sebastian, Gary Pinto and Phil Turcio and was the first single off Sebastian third studio album, Closer to the Sun. He performed the song in the finale of It Takes Two and the Top 24 show of Australian Idol before the single was released. The single debuted at number three in the ARIA Charts, and remained in the top ten for six weeks and gained gold accreditation.

== Track listing ==
CD, digital download
| No. | Title | Length |
|---|---|---|
| 1. | "Taller, Stronger, Better" | 3:48 |
| 2. | "Do Life" | 3:52 |
| 3. | "Taller, Stronger, Better" (vocal mix) | 3:47 |

== Charts ==
| Chart (2006) | Peak position |
|---|---|
| Australia (ARIA) | 3 |

== Certifications ==
| Region | Certification | Certified units/sales |
|---|---|---|
| Australia (ARIA) | Gold | 35,000^{^} |
^{^} Shipments figures based on certification alone.
