= Oh Oh =

2005 single by Guy Sebastian

Single by Guy Sebastian

from the album Beautiful Life
- Released: 7 March 2005
- Recorded: 2004
- Length: 3:06
- Label: Sony BMG
- Songwriters: Guy Sebastian; Jarrad Rogers
- Producer: Jarrad Rogers

Guy Sebastian singles chronology
"Kryptonite" (2004)	"Oh Oh" (2005)	"Taller, Stronger, Better" (2006)

"Oh Oh" is a song written by Guy Sebastian and Jarrad Rogers, released as the third and final single from Sebastian's second studio album, Beautiful Life (2004). The song was released on 7 March 2005 and peaked at number 11 on the Australian ARIA Singles Chart.

== Track listing ==
Australian CD single
No.	Title	Length
1.	"Oh Oh" (Cutfather & Joe remix)	3:17
2.	"Oh Oh" (album version)	3:06
3.	"Sweetest Berry" (live at the State Theatre)	5:21
4.	"Story of a Single Man" (live at the State Theatre)	3:40

== Charts ==
Chart (2005)	Peak position
Australia (ARIA)	11
Australian Urban (ARIA)	4
