= Kryptonite (Guy Sebastian song) =

2004 single by Guy Sebastian

Single by Guy Sebastian

from the album Beautiful Life
- Released: 22 November 2004
- Recorded: 2004
- Length: 3:58
- Label: BMG Australia
- Songwriters: Guy Sebastian; Beau Dozier
- Producer: Beau Dozier

Guy Sebastian singles chronology
"Out with My Baby" (2004)	"Kryptonite" (2004)	"Oh Oh" (2005)

"Kryptonite" is a song written by Guy Sebastian and Beau Dozier and is the second single from Sebastian's second studio album, Beautiful Life (2004). The song was released on 22 November 2004 and peaked at No. 15 on the Australian ARIA Singles Chart.

== Music video ==
A music video was produced to promote the single, which was shot in New Zealand during October 2004.

== Track listing ==
Australian CD single
No.	Title	Length
1.	"Kryptonite"	3:58
2.	"Out with My Baby" (Live n' Funky mix)	3:33
3.	"Kryptonite" (Artificial Colouring mix)	6:05

== Charts ==
Chart (2004)	Peak position
Australia (ARIA)	15
