= Beautiful Life (Guy Sebastian album) =

Studio album by Guy Sebastian
- Released: 18 October 2004
- Recorded: 2004
- Genres: R&B, pop, soul
- Length: 54:52
- Label: Sony BMG

Guy Sebastian chronology
Just as I Am (2003)	Beautiful Life (2004)	Closer to the Sun (2006)

Singles from Beautiful Life
- 1. "Out with My Baby" Released: 26 September 2004; 2. "Kryptonite" Released: 22 November 2004; 3. "Oh Oh" Released: 6 March 2005

Beautiful Life is the second album by Guy Sebastian. It was released 18 October 2004 on Sony BMG Australia and peaked at No. 2 on the ARIA Albums Chart. It was followed by the Beautiful Life concert tour of Australia. During the 8-month course of creating the album, Sebastian travelled to the United States and Europe to work with various songwriters, including Brian McKnight, with whom he penned the song "Wait", and Robin Thicke, whom he co-wrote a number-one charting first single, "Out with My Baby", and "Fiend for You". "How", an original by Thicke, is also included. The album reached Platinum status in Australia and eventually shipped over 100,000 copies.

== Track listing ==
1. "Out with My Baby" (Guy Sebastian/Robin Thicke/James Gass)
2. "Kryptonite" (Sebastian/Beau Dozier)
3. "Sweetest Berry" (Jamey Jaz/David Ryan Harris)
4. "Wait" (Sebastian/Brian McKnight)
5. "Back in the Day" (Sebastian/Fredrik "Fredro" Odesjo/Mats Berntoft)
6. "I Wish" (Stevie Wonder)
7. "Anthem of Why" (Sebastian/Karlsson/Pontus Winnberg/Henrik Jonback)
8. "Story of a Single Man" (Sebastian/Julian Bunetta)
9. "How" (Thicke)
10. "Forever with You" featuring Mýa (Sebastian)
11. "Make Heaven Wait" (Jack Kugell/Jamie Jones/Jason Pennock/Martin Kember/David Garcia)
12. "Fiend for You" (Sebastian/Thicke/Robert Daniels/James Gass)
13. "Oh Oh" (Sebastian/Jarrad Rogers)
14. "Beautiful Life featuring Rahsaan Patterson" (Sebastian/Rogers/Rahsaan Patterson)

== Charts ==
=== Weekly charts ===
Chart (2004)	Peak position
Australian Albums (ARIA)	2

=== Year-end charts ===
Chart (2004)	Position
Australian Albums Chart	59
Australian Artist Albums Chart	17

== Certification ==
Region	Certification	Certified units/sales
Australia (ARIA)	Platinum	70,000^{^}
^{^} Shipments figures based on certification alone.

== Release history ==
Region	Date	Format(s)	Label	Catalog	Ref.
Australia	18 October 2004	CD; digital download	Sony BMG	82876653692	
