= Cover on My Heart =

Single by Guy Sebastian

from the album Closer to the Sun
- Released: 28 July 2007
- Genre: Pop, piano pop
- Length: 4:16
- Label: Sony BMG
- Songwriter(s): Guy Sebastian, Peer Åström and Anders Bagge
- Producer(s): Peer Åström and Anders Bagge

Guy Sebastian singles chronology
"Elevator Love" (2006)	"Cover on My Heart" (2007)	"Receive the Power" (2008)

"Cover on My Heart" is a pop ballad performed by Guy Sebastian and is the third single from his third album Closer to the Sun. Sebastian announced that this song was the album's third single in April 2007. The single was released on 28 July 2007 in Australia, set by his record label Sony BMG Australia. Sebastian performed the song on various programmes such as Sunrise and Rove Live.

== Music video ==
The music video for "Cover on My Heart" was released on 13 June 2007 on the Sony BMG website. It features Sebastian walking the streets of Sydney (where the video was shot) chasing after his love interest who he longs to declare his love for before it is too late. The video also contains a slightly different version of the single to the one released on Closer to the Sun.

== Track listing ==
CD
No.	Title	Length
1.	"Cover on My Heart" (radio mix)	3:59
2.	"Can't Stop a River" (Live at the Basement)	5:02
3.	"Closer to the Sun"	3:54

Digital download
No.	Title	Length
1.	"Cover on My Heart" (radio mix)	3:59
2.	"Can't Stop a River" (Live at the Basement)	5:02
3.	"Closer to the Sun"	3:54
4.	"Jealous Guy" (Live at the Basement)	3:42

== Charts ==
Chart (2007)	Peak position
Australia (ARIA)	32
