= Mind on You (Guy Sebastian song) =

Single by Guy Sebastian

from the album Part 1
- Released: 10 March 2017
- Genre: Pop
- Length: 3:32
- Label: Sony Music Australia
- Songwriter(s): Guy Sebastian; Trey Campbell; Louis Schoorl
- Producer(s): M-Phazes; Louis Schoorl

Guy Sebastian singles chronology
"Set in Stone" (2016)	"Mind on You" (2017)	"High On Me" (2017)

"Mind on You" is a song by Australian recording artist Guy Sebastian. It was released on 10 March 2017 as the third and final single from Sebastian's extended play Part 1 (2016). Sebastian told Nova 96.9, "This song, I guess it's just a kind of soulful song about last night. You know when you meet somebody and you have a great time or you’re just with somebody you know and you're just having an amazing night and then it just lingers. That's that feeling - you just can’t get it out of your mind and it’s the next day and you're still reminiscing about that time. It's a feel good song."

== Promotion ==
Sebastian performed the song live on Today on 17 March 2017, and in the Nova Red Room on 22 March 2017.

== Music video ==
The music video for "Mind on You" was released on 7 March 2017. The video takes place in a disco bowling alley with the real Sebastian spinning tunes in the DJ booth as several of his alter-egos go head to head in a bowling competition. Sebastian said: "I had an absolute blast making this vid and playing all the different characters. I think I enjoyed playing Monica the most."

auspOp reviewed the video, saying "It's exceedingly tongue in cheek, all in good fun. And we appreciate the fact that he’s not taking himself too seriously this time around."

== Reception ==
Michael Smith, in a review of the EP called "Mind on You" a "tropical pop banger".

== Track listing ==
- CD single
1. "Mind on You" – 3:32

== Release history ==
Country	Release date	Format	Label	Catalogue
Australia	10 March 2017	CD Single	Sony Music Australia	88985426542
