= All to Myself (Guy Sebastian song) =

Single by Guy Sebastian

from the album Like It Like That
- Released: 26 February 2010
- Recorded: 2009
- Genre: Soul, jazz, soft rock
- Length: 4:35 (album version); 3:40 (radio edit)
- Label: Sony Music Entertainment
- Songwriters: Carl Dimataga, Guy Sebastian

Guy Sebastian singles chronology
"Art of Love" (2009)	"All to Myself" (2010)	"Never Hold You Down" (2010)

External videos
- Official music video of "All to Myself" was filmed in Buenos Aires, Argentina.

"All to Myself" is the third single from Guy Sebastian's fifth album Like It Like That. The single's B-sides are both covers of Michael Jackson songs. "All to Myself" was shortlisted for the 2011 APRA Song of the Year. A music video was produced to promote the single.

== Track listing ==
No.	Title	Length
1.	"All to Myself" (radio mix)	3:40
2.	"You Are Not Alone" (acoustic)	4:20
3.	"The Way You Make Me Feel" (acoustic)	3:24

== Charts ==
The song debuted on the Australian ARIA Singles Chart on 7 March 2010 and spent three months in the ARIA Top 100, peaking at number 51. It was the third most added track to the radio in its debut week of release.

Year (2010)	Peak Position
Australia (ARIA Chart)	51
Australia (Radio Monitor)	14

== Release history ==
Country	Release date	Format	Label	Catalogue
Australia	26 February 2010	CD single, digital download	Sony BMG	88697654122
