= Elevator Love =

Single by Guy Sebastian

from the album Closer to the Sun
- B-side: "Wish I Didn't Tell You"; "Never Say Goodbye"
- Released: 2 December 2006
- Genre: Pop/Rock
- Length: 3:43
- Label: Sony BMG
- Songwriter(s): Guy Sebastian, Jarrad Rogers
- Producer(s): Jarrad Rogers

Guy Sebastian singles chronology
"Taller, Stronger, Better" (2006)	"Elevator Love" (2006)	"Cover on My Heart" (2007)

"Elevator Love" is the second single released from Guy Sebastian's third studio album, Closer to the Sun. The single also contained two non-album B-sides, "Never Said Goodbye" and "Wish I Didn't Tell You", as well as an instrumental version of "Elevator Love". It reached No. 11 on the ARIA singles chart, spending 15 weeks in the top 50, and achieved gold accreditation.

== Music video ==
The music video for "Elevator Love" premiered on 8 November 2006 on the Nine Network. The video for the single features model and former Miss Universe Jennifer Hawkins as Sebastian's love interest. Footage of Sebastian and a backing band playing in a cage-style elevator is interspersed with shots of the couple. At the end of the video, Sebastian and Hawkins appear to kiss as the doors of the elevator close. The clip was filmed in Sydney's Queen Victoria Building. The video was directed by Owen Trevor, through Ticket to Ride, a Sydney production company.

== Track listing ==
CD, digital download
No.	Title	Length
1.	"Elevator Love"	3:39
2.	"Never Ever Said Goodbye"	3:33
3.	"Wish I Didn't Tell You"	2:45
4.	"Elevator Love" (instrumental)	3:39

== Charts ==
Chart (2007)	Peak position
Australia (ARIA)	11

== Certifications ==
Region	Certification	Certified units/sales
Australia (ARIA)	Gold	35,000^{^}
^{^} Shipments figures based on certification alone.
