= Guy Sebastian discography =

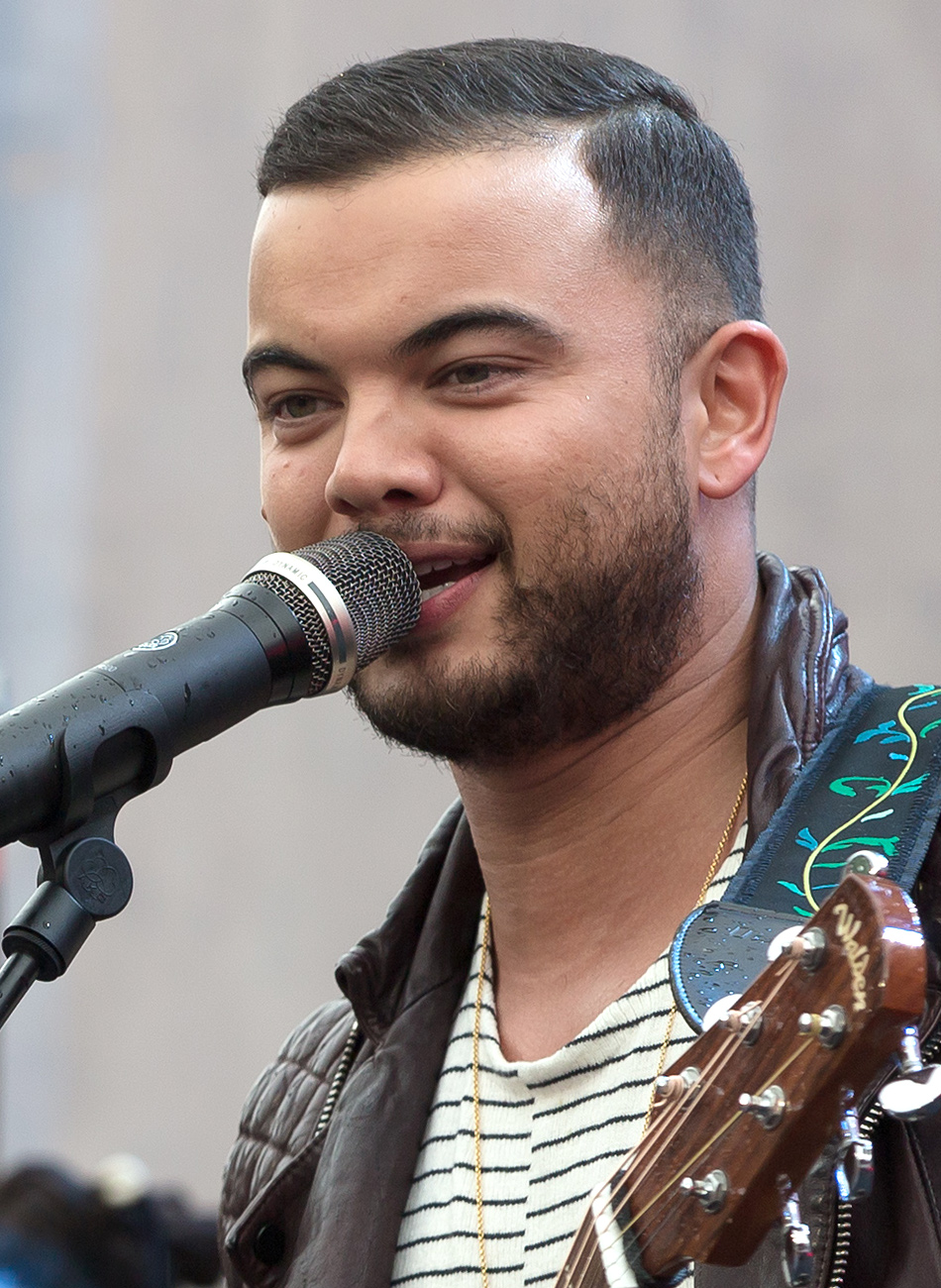
- Sebastian at the ESC2015 Eurovision Village, Vienna, 20 May 2015
- Studio albums: 10
- Extended plays: 3
- Live albums: 1
- Compilation albums: 1
- Singles: 62
- Music videos: 31

The discography of Guy Sebastian, an Australian singer, consists of ten studio albums, one compilation album, one live album, three EPs and 62 singles, including seven as a featured artist and four charity singles. Sebastian won the first series of Australian Idol in 2003, and gained a record deal with Sony BMG. He has released eleven albums which peaked in the top six of the ARIA Charts, including three which reached number one. Eight have achieved either platinum or multi-platinum certification. He has also released twenty three top twenty singles in Australia, with fourteen reaching the top ten, including six number ones. Sebastian is the only Australian male artist in Australian chart history to achieve six number-one singles, and is third overall for all Australian acts with only Kylie Minogue and Delta Goodrem having achieved more. He has also reached the top ten of the New Zealand charts with an album and six singles, including two number ones. Sebastian has eighty-two platinum and seven gold certifications in Australia, the highest number for an Australian Idol contestant. "Battle Scars", a collaboration with Lupe Fiasco, spent 20 weeks in the Billboard Hot 100 chart, peaking at number 71. It also reached number 2 in Norway and New Zealand. The song achieved 3× platinum certification in the United States and New Zealand.

Sebastian's debut single "Angels Brought Me Here" and album Just as I Am both reached number one on the ARIA charts. "Angels Brought Me Here" was the highest selling song in Australia in the 2000 to 2009 decade. The first week sales of 163,711 for Just as I Am were at the time the highest one-week sales ever achieved in Australia, and have since only been surpassed by Susan Boyle's debut album in 2009. With eventual sales of 480,000, just short of 7× platinum, Just as I Am is the highest selling album ever released by an Australian Idol contestant. The second single "All I Need Is You" also reached number one. Sebastian's next two albums were certified platinum. Beautiful Life showcased a stronger contemporary R&B sound and reached number two with a number-one lead single, "Out with My Baby", and two other top twenty singles. Closer to the Sun was a mix of genres, including pop rock, soul, and jazz. It peaked at number four and produced a top ten and top twenty single.

The Memphis Album was a cover album of soul classics recorded in Memphis with Steve Cropper and other members of American soul band the MGs. It peaked at number three and gained a double platinum certification. Like It Like That, which showed the influences of Sebastian's Memphis soul period, reached number six and platinum certification. The title track "Like It Like That" peaked at number one and was the highest selling Australian artist song of 2009. "Art of Love", featuring Jordin Sparks, peaked in the top ten. Twenty Ten was a retrospective album with songs from Sebastian's previous albums, two new songs and ten acoustic tracks. It peaked at number four and was certified double platinum. The album's only single "Who's That Girl", featuring US rapper Eve, reached number one.

Sebastian's seventh and eighth albums were mixtures of soul, R&B and pop. Armageddon peaked at number one and was the second highest selling album by an Australian artist in 2012, and achieved 3× platinum cerification. Four top ten singles were released from the album, including "Battle Scars" which reached number one and was the highest selling Australian artist single of 2012. The song reached 14× platinum in 2023. Sebastian's eighth album Madness reached number six and has been certified gold. The album produced a top ten and three top twenty singles. Sebastian's ninth album Conscious peaked at number four, and his tenth album T.R.U.T.H. was his third to reach number one, and has been certified platinum. Sebastian's eleventh album 100 Times Around the Sun was released in August 2025, and debuted at number two.

== Albums ==
=== Studio albums ===
List of studio albums, with selected chart positions and certifications
Title	Album details	Peak chart positions			Certifications
Title	Album details	AUS	NZ	SWE	Certifications
Just as I Am	Released: 8 December 2003; Label: BMG; Formats: CD, digital download	1	3	—	ARIA: 6× Platinum; RMNZ: 2× Platinum
Beautiful Life	Released: 18 October 2004; Label: BMG; Formats: CD, digital download	2	—	—	ARIA: Platinum
Closer to the Sun	Released: 28 October 2006; Label: Sony BMG; Formats: CD, digital download	4	—	—	ARIA: Platinum
The Memphis Album	Released: 10 November 2007; Label: Sony BMG; Formats: CD, digital download	3	—	—	ARIA: 2× Platinum
Like It Like That	Released: 29 June 2010; Label: Sony Music; Formats: CD, digital download	6	28	—	ARIA: Platinum
Armageddon	Released: 12 October 2012; Label: Sony Music; Formats: CD, digital download	1	20	—	ARIA: 3× Platinum; RMNZ: Platinum
Madness	Released: 21 November 2014; Label: Sony Music; Formats: CD, digital download	6	—	34	ARIA: Gold
Conscious	Released: 3 November 2017; Label: Sony Music; Formats: CD, digital download, streaming	4	—	—	
T.R.U.T.H.	Released: 16 October 2020; Label: Sony Music; Formats: CD, digital download streaming, LP	1	39	—	ARIA: Platinum
100 Times Around the Sun	Released: 9 August 2025; Label: Sony Music; Formats: CD, digital download streaming, LP	2	37	—	
"—" denotes releases that did not chart or were not released in that country.

=== Compilation albums ===
List of compilation albums, with selected chart positions and certifications
Title	Album details	Peak chart positions		Certifications
Title	Album details	AUS	NZ	Certifications
Twenty Ten	Released: 19 November 2010; Label: Sony Music; Format: CD, digital download	4	24	ARIA: 2× Platinum; RMNZ: Gold

=== Live albums ===
List of live albums, with selected chart positions
Title	Album details	Peak chart positions	Certifications
Title	Album details	AUS	Certifications
The Memphis Tour	Released: 3 May 2008; Label: Sony BMG; Format: CD/DVD	12	ARIA: Gold

== Extended plays ==
List of extended plays
Title	Details	Peak chart positions	
Title	Details	AUS	NZ
Your Song	Released: 6 December 2007; Label: Sony BMG; Format: Digital download	—	—
Guy Sebastian EP	Released: 29 May 2009 (US); Label: Sony Music; Format: Digital download	—	—
Part 1	Released: 2 December 2016; Label: Sony Music Australia; Format: Digital download, CD	31	— (Note: Part 1 did not enter the NZ Top 40 Albums Chart, but peaked at number 10 on the NZ Heatseekers Albums Chart.)
Home Sessions 100x	Releasing: 17 April 2026; Label: Sony Music; Format: Digital download	—	—
"—" denotes releases that did not chart or were not released in that country.

== Singles ==
=== As lead artist ===
List of singles as lead artist, with selected chart positions and certifications
Title	Year	Peak chart positions										Certifications	Album
Title	Year	AUS	AUT	GER	NL	NOR	NZ	SWE	SWI	US	US Dance	Certifications	Album
"Angels Brought Me Here"	2003	1	—	—	—	—	1	—	—	—	—	ARIA: 5× Platinum; RMNZ: Platinum	Just as I Am
"All I Need Is You"	2004	1	—	—	—	—	5	—	—	—	—	ARIA: Platinum	Just as I Am
"Out with My Baby"	2004	1	—	—	—	—	—	—	—	—	—	ARIA: Platinum	Beautiful Life
"Kryptonite"	2004	15	—	—	—	—	—	—	—	—	—		Beautiful Life
"Oh Oh"	2005	11	—	—	—	—	—	—	—	—	—		Beautiful Life
"Taller, Stronger, Better"	2006	3	—	—	—	—	—	—	—	—	—	ARIA: Gold	Closer to the Sun
"Elevator Love"	2006	11	—	—	—	—	—	—	—	—	—	ARIA: Gold	Closer to the Sun
"Cover on My Heart"	2007	32	—	—	—	—	—	—	—	—	—		Closer to the Sun
"Like It Like That"	2009	1	—	—	—	—	30	—	—	—	—	ARIA: 5× Platinum; RMNZ: Gold	Like It Like That
"Art of Love" (featuring Jordin Sparks)	2009	8	—	—	—	—	7	—	—	—	—	ARIA: 2× Platinum; RMNZ: Platinum	Like It Like That
"All to Myself"	2010	51	—	—	—	—	—	—	—	—	—		Like It Like That
"Never Hold You Down"	2010	—	—	—	—	—	—	—	—	—	—		Like It Like That
"Who's That Girl" (featuring Eve)	2010	1	—	—	—	—	1	—	—	—	—	ARIA: 6× Platinum; RMNZ: 2× Platinum	Twenty Ten
"Don't Worry Be Happy"	2011	5	—	—	—	—	26	—	—	—	—	ARIA: 5× Platinum; RMNZ: Gold	Armageddon
"Gold"	2012	10	—	—	—	—	—	—	—	—	—	ARIA: Platinum	Armageddon
"Battle Scars" (with Lupe Fiasco)	2012	1	—	—	—	2	2	46	—	71	—	ARIA: 14× Platinum; GLF: Gold; RIAA: 3× Platinum; RMNZ: 3× Platinum	Armageddon
"Get Along"	2012	5	—	—	—	—	9	—	—	—	—	ARIA: 3× Platinum; RMNZ: Gold	Armageddon
"Like a Drum"	2013	4	—	—	—	—	13	49	—	—	20	ARIA: 5× Platinum; GLF: Platinum; RMNZ: Platinum	Madness
"Come Home with Me"	2014	13	—	—	—	—	—	—	—	—	—	ARIA: Platinum	Madness
"Mama Ain't Proud" (featuring 2 Chainz)	2014	17	—	92	—	—	—	—	—	—	—	ARIA: Gold	Madness
"Linger" (featuring Lupe Fiasco)	2014	17	—	—	—	—	—	—	—	—	—	ARIA: Platinum	Madness
"Tonight Again"	2015	12	16	44	71	—	—	22	47	—	—	ARIA: Gold; GLF: Gold	Madness
"Black & Blue"	2015	17	—	—	—	—	—	—	—	—	—	ARIA: Platinum	Non-album single
"Candle"	2016	59	—	—	—	—	—	—	—	—	—		Part 1
"Set in Stone"	2016	11	—	—	—	—	— (Note: "Set in Stone" did not enter the NZ Top 40 Singles Chart, but peaked at number 10 on the NZ Heatseeker Singles Chart.)	—	—	—	—	ARIA: 2× Platinum; RMNZ: Gold	Part 1
"Mind on You"	2017	—	—	—	—	—	—	—	—	—	—		Part 1
"High On Me"	2017	73	—	—	—	—	—	—	—	—	—		Conscious
"Bloodstone"	2017	59	—	—	—	—	—	—	—	—	—	ARIA: Platinum	Conscious
"Before I Go"	2018	43	—	—	41	—	—	—	—	—	—	ARIA: 2× Platinum; NVPI: Platinum	T.R.U.T.H.
"Choir"	2019	7	—	—	—	—	— (Note: "Choir" did not enter the NZ Top 40 Singles Chart, but peaked at number 40 on the NZ Hot Singles Chart.)	—	—	—	—	ARIA: 6× Platinum; RMNZ: Platinum	T.R.U.T.H.
"Let Me Drink" (featuring the HamilTones and Wale)	2019	— (Note: "Let Me Drink" did not enter the ARIA Singles Chart, but peaked at number 30 on the ARIA Digital Track Chart.)	—	—	—	—	—	—	—	—	—	ARIA: Gold	T.R.U.T.H.
"Standing with You"	2020	10	—	—	—	—	— (Note: "Standing with You" did not enter the NZ Top 40 Singles Chart, but peaked at number 12 on the NZ Hot Singles Chart.)	—	—	—	—	ARIA: 2× Platinum; RMNZ: Gold	T.R.U.T.H.
"Love on Display"	2020	61	—	—	—	—	—	—	—	—	—	ARIA: Platinum	T.R.U.T.H.
"Only Thing Missing"	2021	—	—	—	—	—	—	—	—	—	—		T.R.U.T.H.
"Broken Humans" (with Human Nature)	2021	— (Note: "Broken Humans" did not enter the ARIA Top 100 Singles Chart, but peaked at number 31 on the ARIA Digital Track Chart.)	—	—	—	—	—	—	—	—	—		Good Good Life
"Believer"	2021	69	—	—	—	—	—	—	—	—	—	ARIA: Gold	T.R.U.T.H.
"I Chose Good"	2023	— (Note: "I Chose Good" did not enter the ARIA Top 100 Singles Chart, but peaked at number 4 on the ARIA Digital Track Chart.)	—	—	—	—	—	—	—	—	—		100 Times Around the Sun
"Antidote" (featuring Sam Fischer)	2024	— (Note: "Antidote" did not enter the ARIA Top 100 Singles Chart, but peaked at number 2 on the ARIA Digital Track Chart.)	—	—	—	—	—	—	—	—	—		100 Times Around the Sun
"No Reason to Stay"	2024	— (Note: "No Reason to Stay" did not enter the ARIA Top 100 Singles Chart, but peaked at number 1 on the ARIA Digital Track Chart.)	—	—	—	—	—	—	—	—	—		100 Times Around the Sun
"Maybe"	2025	— (Note: "Maybe" did not enter the ARIA Top 100 Singles Chart, but peaked at number 1 on the ARIA Digital Track Chart.)	—	—	—	—	—	—	—	—	—		100 Times Around the Sun
"Cupid"	2025	—	—	—	—	—	—	—	—	—	—		100 Times Around the Sun
"Get It Done"	2025	— (Note: "Get It Done" did not enter the ARIA Top 100 Singles Chart, but peaked at number 12 on the ARIA Digital Track Chart.)	—	—	—	—	—	—	—	—	—		100 Times Around the Sun
"The Keys"	2025	—	—	—	—	—	—	—	—	—	—		100 Times Around the Sun
"100 Times Around the Sun"	2026	—	—	—	—	—	—	—	—	—	—		100 Times Around the Sun
"—" denotes releases that did not chart or were not released in that country.

=== As featured artist ===
List of singles as featured artist, with selected chart positions and certifications
Title	Year	Peak chart positions	Certifications	Album
Title	Year	AUS	Certifications	Album
"Rise Up" (with Australian Idol Top 12)	2003	1	ARIA: Gold	Australian Idol: The Final 12
"Stuck in the Middle" (Adam Harvey featuring Guy Sebastian)	2009	— (Note: "Stuck in the Middle" did not enter the ARIA top 100, but peaked at number 31 on the physical sales chart.Ryan, Gavin (2011). Australia's Music Charts 1988–2010 (pdf ed.). Mt. Martha, VIC, Australia: Moonlight Publishing. p. 125.)		Both Sides Now
"Bed of Clouds" (Swift K.I.D. featuring Guy Sebastian)	2013	42		Non-album single
"Desert" (Paces featuring Guy Sebastian)	2016	—		Vacation
"Feel Alright" (Oliver Nelson featuring Guy Sebastian)	2017	—		Non-album single
"Siren" (Paces featuring Guy Sebastian)	2018	—		Zag
"Permission to Shine" (Bachelor Girl featuring Guy Sebastian)	2026	—		Waiting for the Day: Artist Sessions
"—" denotes releases that did not chart or were not released in that country.

=== Charity singles ===
List of charity singles, with selected chart positions and notes
Title	Year	Peak chart positions		Notes
Title	Year	AUS	NZ	Notes
"Receive the Power" (featuring Paulini)	2007	—	—	Official anthem of World Youth Day 2008
"All Night Long" (Lionel Richie featuring Guy Sebastian)	2011	26	12	A re-recording of Richie's 1983 single. Released to raise money for Australian flood and New Zealand earthquake relief.
"Message in a Bottle"	2012	—	—	A cover of The Police's "Message in a Bottle". Released to raise awareness of Mount Franklin's "Message" campaign for the breast cancer charity the McGrath Foundation.
"Dare to Be Square"	2013	73	—	Released in association with Nickelodeon's anti-bullying campaign to raise funds for Kids Helpline.
"Spirit of the Anzacs" (Lee Kernaghan featuring Guy Sebastian, Sheppard, Jon Stevens, Jessica Mauboy, Shannon Noll and Megan Washington)	2015	32	—	First single from Kernaghan's album Spirit of the Anzacs. The single was released to raise money for Legacy and Soldier On.
"Burn for You"	2024	—	—	A tribute to John Farnham at the 2024 Logie Awards
"—" denotes releases that did not chart or were not released in that country.

== Other appearances ==
List of other non-single song appearances
Title	Year	Album
"What a Wonderful World"	2003	Australian Idol: The Final 12
"The Christmas Song"	2004	The Spirit of Christmas 2004
I Stand in Awe	2004	NCYC 2005 Live This Life
"We Both Know" (with Amy Pearson)	2006	Home: Songs of Hope & Journey
"A Christmas Lullaby"	2006	The Spirit of Christmas 2006
"All I Want for Christmas Is You"	2007	The Spirit of Christmas 2007
"Little Drummer Boy"	2009	The Spirit of Christmas 2009
"All for One" (Ronan Keating featuring Guy Sebastian)	2010	Duet
"Santa Claus Is Coming to Town" (featuring The Australian Girls Choir)	2011	The Spirit of Christmas 2011
"Blur My Hands" (Lupe Fiasco featuring Guy Sebastian)	2015	Tetsuo & Youth
"Keeping Score" (Paces featuring Guy Sebastian)	2016	Like a Version Volume 12
"So Close" (Tinie Tempah featuring Guy Sebastian & Bugzy Malone)	2017	Youth
"Do The Propeller!" (The Wiggles featuring Guy Sebastian)	2017	The Wiggles Duets
"The Magic of Christmas Time" (Samantha Jade with Guy Sebastian)	2018	The Magic of Christmas
"Battle Scars"	2020	Music from the Home Front
"A Christmas Lullaby" (with CDB & Gary Pinto)	2020	Christmas Is Here: The CDB Mixtape
"Pool Party" (Sam Moran featuring Guy Sebastian)	2021	—N/a
"Lonely" (Illy featuring Guy Sebastian)	2021	The Space Between
"Bring It On Home to Me" (Gary Pinto featuring Guy Sebastian)	2022	Sam Cooke the Music
"Made of Heart", "Like a Phoenix" and "Teri Boli" (with various artists)	2025	Hindi Vindi

== Music videos ==
List of music videos
Title	Year	Director(s)
"Angels Brought Me Here"	2003	John Foreman
"All I Need Is You"	2004	
"Out with My Baby"	2004	Drew Bailey
"Kryptonite"	2004	Tim Groenendaal
"Oh Oh"	2005	Jonathan and Josh Baker (TWiN)
"Elevator Love"	2006	Owen Trevor
"Taller, Stronger, Better"	2006	Jonathan and Josh Baker (TWiN)
"Cover on My Heart"	2007	Simon Rippingale
"In the Midnight Hour"	2007	
"Like It Like That"	2009	Mark Alston
"Art of Love"	2009	Brandon Cox
"Fail to Mention"	2009	
"Stuck in the Middle" (Adam Harvey featuring Guy Sebastian)	2009	
"All to Myself"	2010	Ivan Barge
"Never Hold You Down"	2010	Matthew Chuang
"Who's That Girl"	2010	Mark Alston
"Don't Worry Be Happy"	2011	Gemma Lee
"Gold"	2012	Guy Franklin
"Battle Scars"	2012	Jonathan and Josh Baker (TWiN)
"Get Along"	2012	Phillip Graybill
"Like a Drum"	2013	Will Joines
"Come Home with Me"	2014	Matt Earl; Dylan Duclos
"Mama Ain't Proud"	2014	Courtney Hard
"Linger"	2015	Courtney Hard
"Spirit of the Anzacs"	2015	Kris Kerehona
"Tonight Again"	2015	Matt Sharp
"Black & Blue"	2015	Matt Sharp
"Desert" (Paces featuring Guy Sebastian)	2016	Patrick Rohl and Sam Bratby
"Candle"	2016	Dom Bartolo
"Set in Stone"	2016	Cameron Craig
"Mind on You"	2017	
"High on Me"	2017	
"Bloodstone"	2017	
"Before I Go"	2018	James Chappell
"Choir"	2019	James Chappell
"Let Me Drink"	2019	James Chappell
"Standing with You"	2020	James Chappell
"Love on Display"	2020	
"Only Thing Missing"	2021	
"Broken Humans" (with Human Nature)	2021	
"Believer"	2021	James Chappell
"I Choose Good"	2023	
"Antidote" (with Sam Fischer)	2024	
"Get It Done"	2025	
"Strangers"	2025	
"The Keys"	2025	
