= Madness Tour =

2015 concert tour by Guy Sebastian

Madness
- Tour by Guy Sebastian
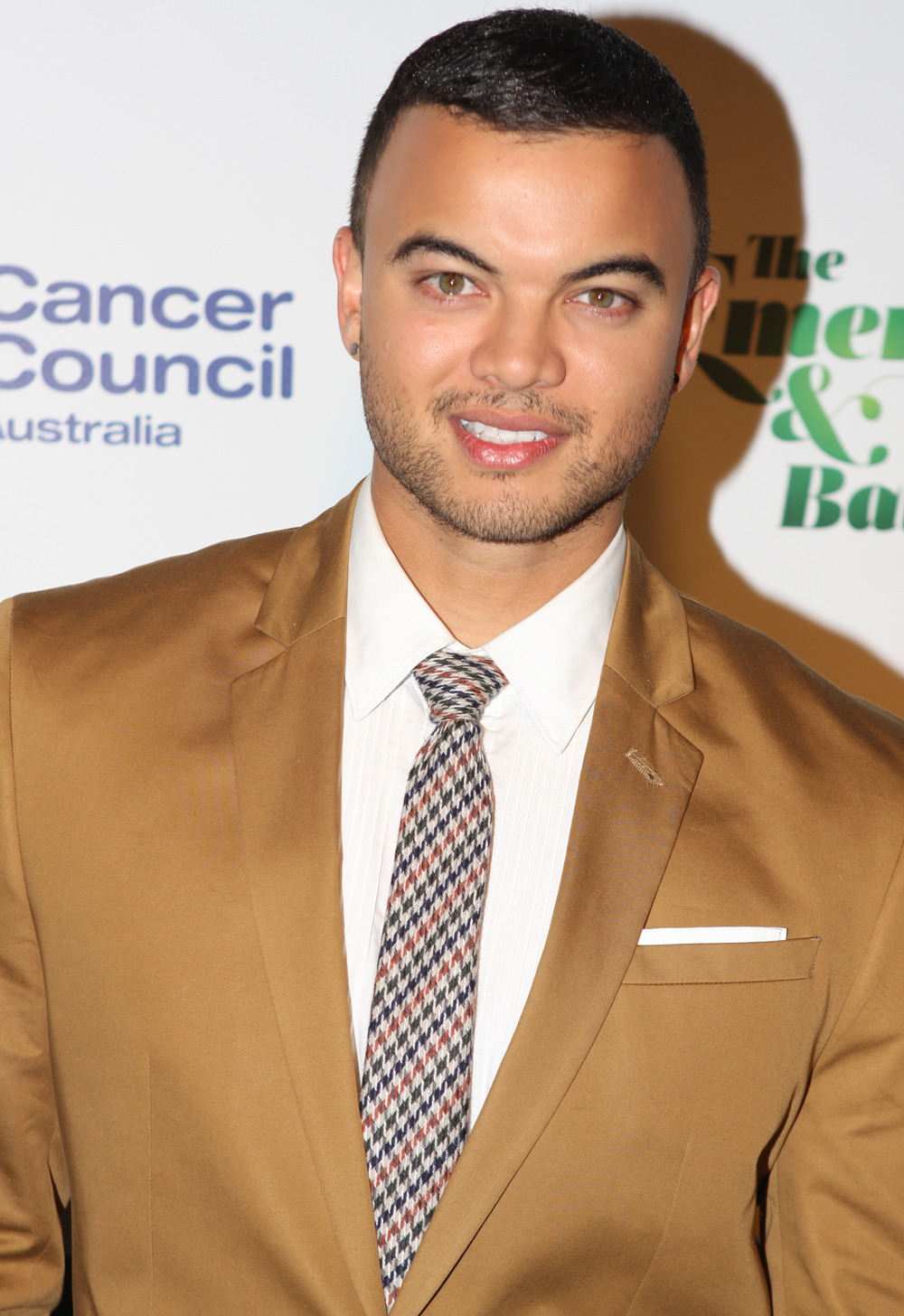
- Guy Sebastian
- Associated album: Madness
- Start date: 12 February 2015
- End date: 28 February 2015
- Legs: 1
- No. of shows: 6 Arena venues in Australia; 6 Total

Guy Sebastian concert chronology
- Get Along Tour (2013); Madness Tour (2015)

Madness Tour is the eleventh concert tour by Australian recording artist Guy Sebastian. The tour supported his seventh studio album Madness. This is Sebastian's first national full-scale production arena tour similar to international acts touring Australia. Sebastian said winning the Best Live Act at the 2014 ARIAs last year for his sold out 53-date Get Along Tour supporting his Armageddon album helped him decide it was time to play the big stages. He joins an elite club of local acts who have undertaken arenas tours, including AC/DC, Keith Urban, John Farnham, Delta Goodrem, Kylie Minogue and Jimmy Barnes.

== Background and synopsis ==
In an interview with Max Olijnyk from The Sydney Morning Herald Sebastian said that on his last tour he had done over 50 shows in various sized venues and had to continuously change production based on capacity. He found this frustrating. He said that as this album is dynamic with big horns and drums an arena tour would enable him to replicate the album on a huge stage. The tour included six dates, comprising concerts in five mainland capital cities and the NSW regional city of Wollongong. Sebastian also performed two warm up shows in Dubbo.

Fatai, a semi-finalist on the first The Voice series, was the support act. She returned to the stage to sing "Lightning" with Sebastian, a song she is the featured singer for on the Madness album. Sebastian performed with an eight-piece band, and he played guitar and piano on some of the songs. Carmen Smith, Gary Pinto and Vince Harder were the backing vocalists, and also performed as backup dancers. The staging included large screens and LED lighting. The concert was structured in two parts and an encore. The first half was mainly dedicated to performing the album tracks from Madness, with Sebastian taking time to explain the meaning behind some of the songs. During this part of the show Sebastian also sang the single "Like a Drum", and two singles from previous albums, "Who's That Girl" and "Get Along". In the second half of the concert Sebastian took the audience on a musical journey of his career to date. He started with a re-enactment of his Australian Idol win, and sang his first single "Angels Brought Me Here", and moved through a number of his early songs, including "All I Need Is You", "Out With My Baby", "Elevator Love" and "Like It Like That". Nostalgic videos played on the screens during these songs. Some of the songs lost verses, and some included mashups of covers such as "Uptown Funk" and "All Of Me". Sebastian also sang "Linger" and "Battle Scars", performing Lupe Fiasco's rap himself. He ended the concert with "Mama Ain't Proud" and "Gold".

== Critical reception ==
The Madness Tour received mixed but generally positive reviews. Craig L. Thomson from Tom Magazine wrote that the concert showed how far Sebastian had progressed as a singer, songwriter and performer, saying "his voice is just gold and he is one of those vocalists that could sing almost anything". He observed that "a cross section of kids and teenagers, both alone and with parents in tow, are in abundance. A very healthy number of adults, who I suspect have grown with Sebastian since his career started on Australian Idol in 2003, also make up the audience tonight". He said Sebastian "put on an excellent show, and with a fan base that transcends age brackets that is no simple task". A reviewer for music site Trendio said his voice sounded "flawless in each song" and wrote "It’s been 12 years since the now 33 year old Guy Sebastian won Australian Idol and his popularity continues to grow. After seeing him live for myself I can see why and I hope he continues to share his talent with us for many years to come".

Joel Meares from The Sydney Morning Herald wrote that the combination of Sebastian's early pop songs with the "darker R&B that has come to define him recently" felt jarring. He also said with the stage so bare, production scant and no camera to project his image to the back of the arena that Sebastian got lost. But he noted that "the voice, it must be said, is incredible: Sebastian tickles his high notes and grinds into the lows" and that during "Get Along" it was "shatteringly strong". He said the show's big plus, along with Sebastian's voice, was the band, particularly the horns. Brad Szmerling from auspOp, who had seen Sebastian in concert in 2004 soon after his Idol win said there were noticeable differences from his early years. "There was an added confidence and a clarity in his singing that was incredible to witness. Even though we have no personal stake in his career, there was a sense of pride at Guy's ability to command an audience". Szmerling said his vocal delivery during "Get Along" could only be described as "epic". He wrote that the first half of the concert was a bit slow as although the Madness songs sounded as strong live as the recorded versions there were too many non-singles in a row. He felt that the second part of the show "was where things really got good". He concluded, "In terms of running an arena-scale show, Guy certainly gave it his all. He incorporated choreography and video effects, but not to an extent where it felt forced or beyond his dancing ability.[...] The show wasn't perfect but he sold a lot of seats and made a great impression".

In a review for The Advertiser Amelia Broadstock wrote it didn't take long for Sebastian "to have the packed crowd on its feet" and "within the first five minutes, his impressive vocals were on show and so were his dance moves". She stated "Sebastian’s show proved why he is one of the best Australian artists in the industry – and we’re proud to call him SA's own". Jenny Ringland from Perth Now wrote "although critics have questioned the 33-year-old’s ability to pull such a spectacle off, there was no doubt among his Perth fans". She said "Sebastian is infectious, with a voice that sounds so perfect you almost take it for granted. He plays the guitar, gets his groove on, connects with the audience and generally has a good time. What’s not to love?"

== Tour credits ==
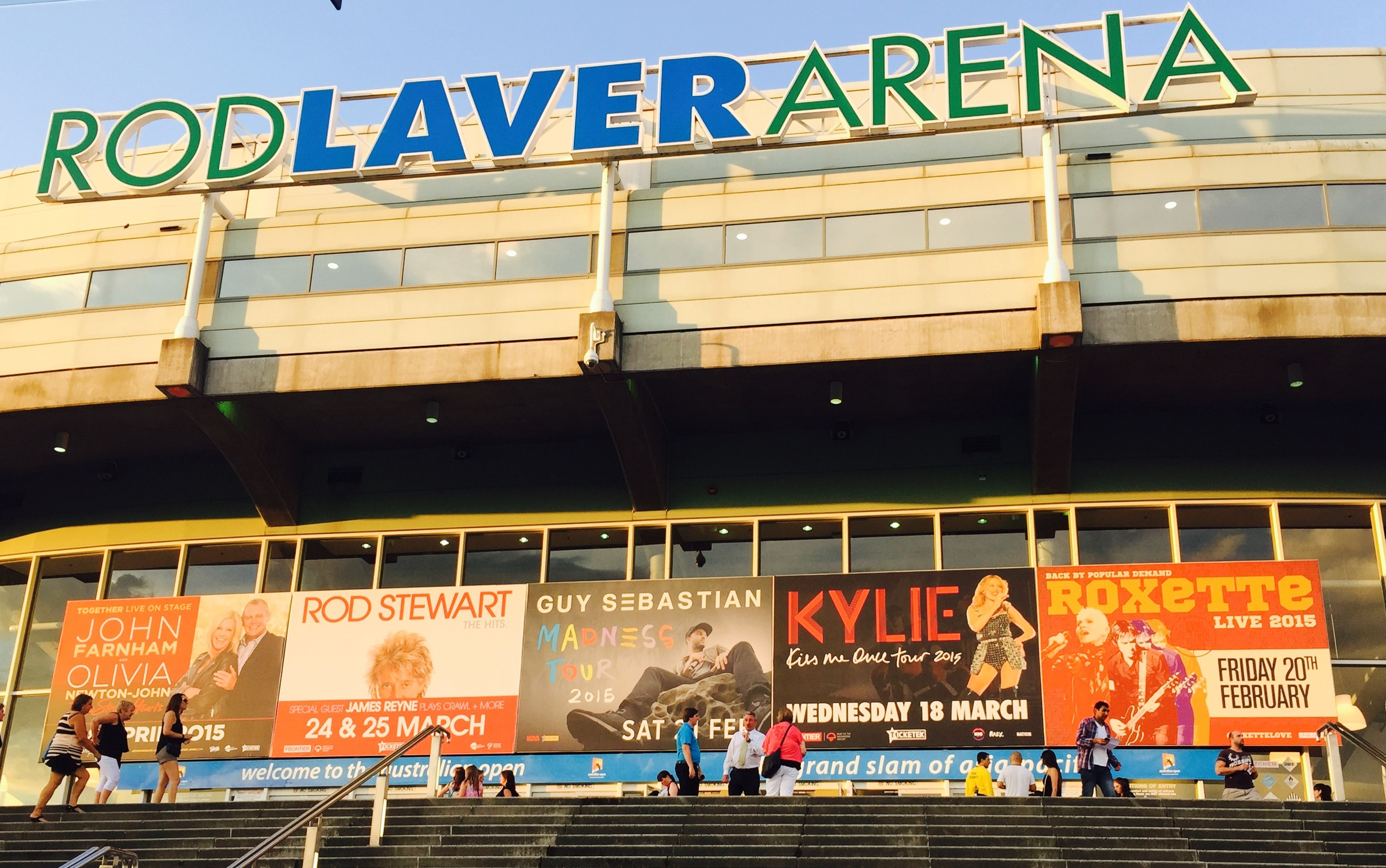
Sebastian performed at Rod Laver Arena in February 2015

- Guy Sebastian – Lead vocals, guitar, keys, programming, arrangements
- David Tweedie – Lead guitar
- Wendy Anggerani – Keys
- Adam Ventoura – bass
- Terepai Richmond – drums
- Carmen Smith- Backing vocals
- Gary Pinto- Backing vocals
- Vince Harder- Backing vocals
- Sam Boon – Baritone Sax, section leader/arranger
- Travis Woods – trumpet
- Nic Ryan Glenie – trumpet
- Will Morrisey – tenor sax

Support act – Fatai

Crew

- Bruce Ramus – Creative director/show designer
- Daniel Redgrave – Tour manager
- Adrian Bernard – Production manager
- Anatole Day – FOH audio engineer
- Gabe Robinson – art director
- Courtney Day – executive producer
- Titus Day – Management
- Justin Arthur – Monitor engineer
- Brett Millican – Stage and backline manager
- Bonnie McGuiness – TM assistant
- Nathan Balderstone – Stage tech
- Hayden Vassallo – Backline tech
- AFG – Touring head Rigger
- Troy Brown – Lighting chief
- Michael Parsons – Lighting dimmers
- Rowan Denny – Lighting
- Matt Spiker – Lighting
- John Watterson – FOH audio systems
- Matt Whitehead – Monitor systems tech
- Johnathon Warren – Audio
- Addam Crawford – Catalyst systems
- Dan Aulich – Vision chief
- Sean Killa – Vision

Production supplied by

- Audio – Northwest Productions
- Lighting – MPH Australia
- Vision – Mediatec
- Trucking – ATS Logistics

Promoters

- Empire Touring
- Red Events

Animators

Mark Dickson, Ben Hurt, Bruce Ramus, Emma Valente, Eneti Waretini, Michael Mascarenas, Bailey Sharp, Paul Rhodes

Management – 6 Degrees Management

Agency – The Harbour Agency

PR – Flourish PR

Special Thanks

James Waldron – Sennheiser Australia, Fremantle, Channel 7, Ticketek, and George Antoni for his concert photography

== Set List ==
The following set list is representative of the show on 21 February 2015 at Rod Laver Arena, Melbourne. It may not be representative of all concerts for the duration of the tour.

1. "Madness"
2. "Animal in Me"
3. "Like a Drum"
4. "Who's That Girl"
5. "Lightning"
6. "Elephant"
7. "Light and Shade"
8. "Get Along"
9. "One of Us"
10. "Imagine the Sunrise"
11. "The Pause"
12. "Angels Brought Me Here"/"All I Need Is You"
13. "Out With My Baby"/"Uptown Funk"
14. "Oh Oh"
15. "Elevator Love"
16. "Attention"
17. "All to Myself"/"All Of Me"/"Art of Love"
18. "Like It Like That"
19. "Linger"
20. "Battle Scars"
21. "Mama Ain't Proud"
22. "Gold"

== Tour dates ==
Date	City	Country	Venue
12 February 2015	Wollongong	Australia	WIN Entertainment Centre
14 February 2015	Brisbane	Australia	Brisbane Entertainment Centre
18 February 2015	Sydney	Australia	Qantas Credit Union Arena
21 February 2015	Melbourne	Australia	Rod Laver Arena
25 February 2015	Adelaide	Australia	Adelaide Entertainment Centre
28 February 2015	Perth	Australia	Perth Arena
