= Sebastian discography (disambiguation) =

Sebastian discography may refer to:

- Sebastian discography, French musician Sébastien Akchoté (born 1981)
- List of compositions by Johann Sebastian Bach, German composer (1685 – 1750)
- Belle and Sebastian discography, Scottish indie pop band
- Sebastian Bach discography, Canadian heavy metal singer, (born 1968)
- Guy Sebastian discography, Australian pop singer (born 1981)
- Sebastián Yatra discography, Colombian pop singer (born 1994)
- Sebastian Ingrosso discography, Swedish DJ (born 1983)
- Sebastian Arocha Morton production discography, American composer
