= Siren (Paces song) =

Single by Paces featuring Guy Sebastian

from the album Zag
- Released: 17 August 2018
- Genre: Pop
- Length: 3:05
- Label: Etcetc

Paces (musician) singles chronology
"Call the 5-0" (2018)	"Siren" (2018)	"Technique" (2018)

Guy Sebastian singles chronology
"Feel Alright" (2017)	"Siren" (2018)	"Before I Go" (2018)

"Siren" is a song by Australian record producer Paces featuring Australian recording artist Guy Sebastian. The song was released on 17 August 2018 as the sixth single from Paces second studio album, Zag (2018).

== Background and release ==
Paces re-mixed Sebastian's 2015 single "Black & Blue". In May 2016 the duo recorded "Keeping Score" on Triple J and released "Desert" in August 2016. Paces said “I've had the extreme good fortune of working with Guy on quite a few projects now, for "Siren" we recorded a bunch of takes which were all great, then I told him to go back into the booth and do it one more time so I could film it for Instagram. That's the take that I ended up using!”

== Reception ==
Eurovision Union reviewed the track saying "The song doesn't sound too far from what we would regularly hear from Guy Sebastian, but the key difference being the song is more electronic with his vocals manipulated in stages of the song. The song feels nightclub worthy with big build ups, but Guy's voice still makes it feel somehow relaxed."

== Charts ==
Chart (2016)	Position
Australian Digital Track Chart	48
