= Tonight Again =

2015 single by Guy Sebastian

Single by Guy Sebastian

from the album Madness
- Released: 7 April 2015
- Recorded: 2015
- Genre: Funk
- Length: 3:23 (original version); 2:55 (ESC version)
- Label: Columbia; Sony
- Songwriters: Guy Sebastian; David Ryan Harris; Louis Schoorl
- Producer: Louis Schoorl

Guy Sebastian singles chronology
"Spirit of the Anzacs" (2015)	"Tonight Again" (2015)	"Black & Blue" (2015)

Music video
- "Tonight Again" on YouTube

Eurovision Song Contest 2015 entry
- Country: Australia
- Artist: Guy Sebastian
- Language: English
- Composers: Guy Sebastian, David Ryan Harris, Louis Schoorl
- Lyricists: Guy Sebastian, David Ryan Harris, Louis Schoorl

Finals performance
- Final result: 5th
- Final points: 196

Entry chronology
- "Sound of Silence" (2016) ►

Official performance videos
- "Tonight Again" (grand final) on YouTube

"Tonight Again" is a song by Australian recording artist Guy Sebastian, premiered on 16 March 2015 before being released as a single on digital platforms on 7 April. Co-written and recorded by Sebastian in a week specifically for the Eurovision Song Contest 2015, the song served as Australia's first-ever entry, with Sebastian himself competing. "Tonight Again" appears as the final track on the European edition of Sebastian's eighth studio album, Madness (2014).

== Background and composition ==
At a press conference held at the Sydney Opera House on 5 March 2015, it was announced that the Australian public broadcaster, Special Broadcasting Service (SBS), had internally selected Guy Sebastian to represent Australia at the 2015 Eurovision Song Contest. On 16 March, Sebastian's song for the Eurovision Song Contest was officially revealed online by SBS through the release of a music video for "Tonight Again".

The song was written within a week by Sebastian, specifically for the Eurovision Song Contest. He collaborated with fellow songwriters David Ryan Harris and Louis Schoorl whom he had worked previously on other projects. On the choice of the song, Sebastian said, "When it came time to decide on a song, I thought since I had a couple of days off in Australia, I would try and write something new. But if I was to record a new song, I wanted it to be homegrown and organic with my band in my studio. Truly, we jumped in the studio and let it happen because I wanted to write something fun! We all have moments you don't want to end and you wish you could live those moments every day so I wanted to write a song about that feeling. I am sure that is how I am going to feel when I am in Vienna performing."

== Track listing ==
Digital download
No.	Title	Length
1.	"Tonight Again"	3:23

German CD single
No.	Title	Length
1.	"Tonight Again"	3:23
2.	"Mama Ain't Proud" (featuring 2 Chainz)	3:46

== Charts ==
=== Weekly charts ===
Chart (2015)	Peak position
Australia (ARIA)	12
Austria (Ö3 Austria Top 40)	16
Belgium (Ultratip Bubbling Under Flanders)	28
Belgium (Ultratip Bubbling Under Wallonia)	34
Germany (GfK)	44
Iceland (RÚV)	24
Netherlands (Single Top 100)	71
Sweden (Sverigetopplistan)	22
Switzerland (Schweizer Hitparade)	47
UK Singles (Official Charts Company)	178

=== Year-end chart ===
Chart (2015)	Position
Australian Artist Singles (ARIA)	39

== Certifications ==
Region	Certification	Certified units/sales
Australia (ARIA)	Gold	35,000^{‡}
Sweden (GLF)	Gold	20,000^{‡}
^{‡} Sales+streaming figures based on certification alone.

== Release history ==
Region	Date	Format	Label
Australia	7 April 2015	Digital download	Columbia Records; Sony Music
Germany	22 May 2015	CD single	Columbia Records; Sony Music
