= Yorke (musician) =

Australian musician

- Born: Grace Hughes
- Origin: Byron Bay
- Genres: pop, indie pop
- Occupation: Singer-songwriter
- Label: Island Records Australia
- Website: https://www.yorkemusic.com/

Grace Hughes, known as Yorke, is an Australian musician, singer and songwriter from Byron Bay, Australia. Grace supported Ruel on his 2019 Painkiller tour. Her song "Wake the City" was featured on the show 9-1-1.

Her debut EP Liberosis was released in March 2020. In May 2021, Yorke released "Window Shopping".

In December 2022, Yorke released their second EP Ten Feet Tall, followed by an Australian tour in February 2023.

Her third EP Unfinished Business was announced in March 2025 and released in June 2025. It's companion, Finished Business features collaborations of the songs on Unfinished Business.

== Discography ==
=== Extended plays ===
Title	Details	Peak chart positions
Title	Details	AUS
Liberosis	Released: 27 March 2020; Label: Island, Universal Music Australia; Formats: digital download, streaming	—
Ten Feet Tall	Released: 2 December 2022; Label: Island, Universal Music Australia; Formats: digital download, streaming	—
Unfinished Business	Released: 13 June 2025; Label: Island, Universal Music Australia; Formats: digital download, streaming	—
Finished Business	Released: 10 April 2026; Label: Island, Universal Music Australia; Formats: digital download, streaming	97

=== Singles ===
Title	Year	Album
"First Light"	2018	Liberosis
"Wake the City"	2019	Liberosis
"Thought I Could"	2019	Liberosis
"Vertigo" (with Paces)	2019	Non-album singles
"Treading Water"	2020	Non-album singles
"Gravity"	2020	Non-album singles
"King" (with Links	2020	Spirits
"Window Shopping"	2021	Non-album single
"Next Life"	2022	Ten Feet Tall
"I'll Keep Driving"	2022	Ten Feet Tall
"When the Honeymoon Is Over"	2022	Ten Feet Tall
"Love on the Run"	2024	Unfinished Business
"I Wanna Hate You"	2025	Unfinished Business
"Sorry in Advance"	2025	Unfinished Business
"The Villain"	2025	Unfinished Business
"Airplane Mode"	2025	Unfinished Business
"Break Up Season"	2026	
