= Standing with You =

Single by Guy Sebastian

from the album T.R.U.T.H.
- Released: 26 June 2020
- Length: 3:52
- Label: Sony
- Songwriters: Guy Sebastian; Jamie Hartman; Greg Holden
- Producer: Jamie Hartman

Guy Sebastian singles chronology
"Let Me Drink" (2019)	"Standing with You" (2020)	"Love on Display" (2020)

Music video
- "Standing with You" on YouTube

"Standing with You" is a song by Australian singer Guy Sebastian, released on 26 June 2020 as the fourth single from his ninth studio album T.R.U.T.H.. The song reached number 10 on the Australian charts, Sebastian's 24th ARIA top 50 single, and 14th to peak in the top 10. It achieved 2× platinum certification in Australia, and was also certified gold in New Zealand. Sebastian was nominated for the Best Male Artist for Standing With You at the 2020 Aria Awards, and the song won Best Video. The song was also nominated for Song of Year at the 2021 APRA Music Awards.

== Background ==
Sebastian co-wrote the song with Jamie Hartman, who also produced and co-wrote "Before I Go", the Platinum-selling, lead single from Sebastian's forthcoming album. Sebastian said "We've written quite a few tunes together, Jamie and myself, so it's proving to be a good partnership".

The song centres around issues surrounding mental-ill health and the struggle to support loved ones who are suffering. In a lead-up to the song's release, Sebastian said "A family member of mine was going through a very tough time, and he was brave enough to share his battle with his own mental health, and that inspired this song".

Sebastian and Hartman tapped into their own experiences with the vastly increasing number of people who are struggling with depression and mental health issues. Sebastian said "It's about the power of just being there. Sometimes – as a friend or as a support to people who go through things – it's not about having the right anecdotes or answers; it's really more about just being that silent presence. Especially at a time like this when there's a lot of people who are feeling isolated, this song is a reminder to look out for people who feel alone".

== Music video ==
The music video for "Standing with You" was directed by James Chappell and released on 26 June 2020.

== Charts ==
=== Weekly charts ===
Chart (2020)	Peak position
Australia (ARIA)	10
New Zealand Hot Singles (RMNZ)	12

=== Year-end charts ===
Chart (2020)	Position
Australian Artist (ARIA)	17

== Certifications ==
Region	Certification	Certified units/sales
Australia (ARIA)	2× Platinum	140,000^{‡}
New Zealand (RMNZ)	Gold	15,000^{‡}
^{‡} Sales+streaming figures based on certification alone.
