= Let Me Drink =

Single by Guy Sebastian featuring The HamilTones and Wale

from the album T.R.U.T.H.
- Released: 15 November 2019
- Length: 4:13
- Label: Sony
- Songwriter(s): Guy Sebastian; M-Phazes; Olubowale Victor Akintimehin
- Producer(s): M-Phazes

Guy Sebastian singles chronology
"Choir" (2019)	"Let Me Drink" (2019)	"Standing with You" (2020)

Wale singles chronology
"Love & Loyalty" (2019)	"Let Me Drink" (2019)	"Love... (Her Fault)" (2020)

"Let Me Drink" is a song by Australian singer Guy Sebastian featuring The HamilTones and Wale. It was released on 15 November 2019 as the third single from his ninth studio album T.R.U.T.H..

The song was nominated for Most Performed Pop Work at the APRA Music Awards of 2021

== Background ==
Sebastian admits that The HamilTones remind him of growing up and his involvement in church music. Sebastian wrote "Let Me Drink" on the night before The HamilTones were scheduled to join Sebastian in the studio to record some backing vocals for his upcoming album. Sebastian recalls thinking "I'm crazy if I don't write something that's super-catered to them... I reckon it probably took 15 minutes to write. I started singing that 'Come on let me drink' melody, I could immediately hear the background vocals and I just knew it had to be a call-and-response thing. And then I sat down and nutted out a standard blues chord progression. With me, I write really quickly if I’m led by something."

On 3AW radio, Sebastian told Denis Walter the song is "very lighthearted". He told Walter "I needed something a little bit light, and something that wasn't so emotional because 'Choir' is about losing a friend of mine, and 'Before I Go' was quite an emo sort of song as well."

== Music video ==
The music video for "Let Me Drink" was directed by James Chappell and released on 2 December 2019.

== Charts ==
Chart (2019)	Peak position
Australia (ARIA Digital Track Chart)	30

== Certifications ==
Certifications for "Let Me Drink"
Region	Certification	Certified units/sales
Australia (ARIA)	Gold	35,000^{‡}
^{‡} Sales+streaming figures based on certification alone.
