= The Memphis Tour =

Live album by Guy Sebastian
- Released: 3 May 2008
- Genres: Soul, funk, R&B
- Label: Sony BMG

Guy Sebastian chronology
Your Song (2007)	The Memphis Tour (2008)	Like It Like That (2009)

External videos
- Official Music Video "Gimme Some Lovin"
- Official video: "On A Dusty Road" preview

The Memphis Tour is a live DVD/CD by Australian singer Guy Sebastian, released on 3 May 2008 through Sony BMG. The DVD features a live recording of one of Sebastian's concerts from his national tour of the same name. Sebastian's backing band during the tour included Steve Cropper, Donald 'Duck' Dunn and Steve Potts, members of the American soul band the MGs, who recorded The Memphis Album with Sebastian in 2007. The DVD also includes a 20-minute documentary detailing the making of The Memphis Album. The CD features live audio from the same concert.

== Background ==
In 2007, Sebastian recorded a cover album of soul songs at Ardent Studios, Memphis, with Steve Cropper, Donald 'Duck' Dunn, and Steve Potts (a.k.a. the MGs), with Lester Snell on keyboards. The MGs were the Stax band that played on many of the original versions of the songs Sebastian recorded on the album. Steve Cropper was also the co-writer of three of the songs, "In the Midnight Hour", "Knock on Wood" and "(Sittin' On) The Dock of the Bay". Whilst recording The Memphis Album, The Mgs and Snell agreed to come to Australia to be Sebastian's backing band on his 2008 national tour.

== The Tour ==
Donald "Duck" Dunn, Sebastian and Steve Cropper during The Memphis Tour, March 2008

The Memphis Tour was held during February and March 2008. The tour began on 26 February with two concerts at The Bridge Hotel, Sydney, followed by sixteen further concerts in mainly theatre venues around Australia. After the first concert of the tour, Sebastian spoke to Stuart Bocking from radio station 2UE about what it felt like to be on stage with the MGs, "There were so many moments when I just had to take a step back and think 'This is unbelievable'. Like the history that is behind me, and I'm singing these songs. You know they start playing Dock Of The Bay, and the guys that played it are on the stage. You know the guy who wrote the song with Otis Redding is playing guitar. The same with Midnight Hour and Knock on Wood. All these songs that I keep starting. These guys played on the original and wrote the songs and were the sound that created them." During the interview, Sebastian said he had just received a message from Dunn saying, "Thank you for inviting me on this tour. I'm having the time of my life and it's an honour to play with you."

On his return to the US, Cropper spoke to online Memphis radio station AllMemphisMusic about the tour, "There was a little apprehension about us going down to play behind him because the people who were fans were there to see Guy. Well they were there to see some of the old Memphis guys as well. And that comradre with everybody, and hearing him singing our music, which was born and raised and produced and recorded in Memphis Tennessee. It was just something I, it's hard to explain the excitement coming from being on stage and that excitement coming out of the audience. It just filled our hearts. Because they really liked us, and they really liked that good old Memphis music, and here's one of the biggest Idols singing that music. It's just pretty much an overwhelming experience that we will probably never ever get over. I hope some way we can do it again."

Sebastian was nominated for a Helpmann Award for The Memphis Tour for "Best Performance In An Australian Contemporary Concert". The annual Helpmann Awards recognise distinguished artistic achievement and excellence in the many disciplines of Australia's live performance sectors. They are similar to the Tony Awards on Broadway and the Olivier Awards in London. The concert at The Palms in Melbourne was filmed and released as a DVD/CD in May 2008. Apart from songs from The Memphis Album, which Sebastian sang during the tour, it also contains "I Feel a Fire", an original song written by Sebastian, and a performance by the MGs of Green Onions, their hit soul instrumental from 1962. The DVD also has a 20-minute documentary called "On a Dusty Road" about the making of The Memphis Album.

== Track listing ==
=== DVD and CD ===
No.	Title	Writer(s)	Length
1.	"Gimme Some Lovin'"	Steve Winwood, Mervyn Winwood, Spencer Davis	4:32
2.	"Soul Man"	Isaac Hayes, David Porter	2:42
3.	"Hold On, I'm Comin'"	Samuel David Moore, David Prater	3:20
4.	"In the Midnight Hour"	Steve Cropper, Wilson Pickett	3:08
5.	"Let's Stay Together"	Al Green, Willie Mitchell	6:12
6.	"Hard to Handle"	Alvertis Isbell, Allen Jones, Otis Redding	3:03
7.	"Under the Boardwalk"	Arthur Resnick, Kenny Young	4:36
8.	"I've Been Loving You Too Long"	Jerry Butler, Otis Redding	5:37
9.	"Green Onions"	Booker T. Jones, Steve Cropper, Al Jackson, Lewis Steinberg	5:05
10.	"I Feel a Fire"	Guy Sebastian	5:54
11.	"Take Me to the River"	Mabon Hodges, Al Green	4:38
12.	"Respect Yourself"	Luther Ingram, Mack Rice	4:54
13.	"(Sittin' On) The Dock of the Bay"	Steve Cropper, Otis Redding	4:25
14.	"Knock on Wood"	Steve Cropper, Eddie Floyd	4:34
15.	"Shake a Tail Feather"	Otha Hayes, Verlie Rice, Andre Williams	2:54

=== DVD extras ===
"On a Dusty Road" documentary

== Personnel ==
DVD and CD

- Guy Sebastian – vocals
- Steve Cropper – guitar
- Donald 'Duck' Dunn – bass
- Steve Potts – drums
- Lester Snell – piano, keys, organ
- Carl Dimatago – guitar
- Ben Gurton – trombone
- Mat Ottignon – saxophone
- Dee Uluirewa – backing vocals
- Gary Pinto – backing vocals
- Patricia Snell – backing vocals
- Ivan Ordenes – sound recordist
- John Smith – director
- Micheal Bramley – technical director
- David McKell – camera operator
- Charlie Sarroff – camera operator
- Cameron Davies – camera operator
- Renzo Beltrame – camera operator

"On a Dusty Road" documentary

- J. B. Carlin – camera operator, director
- Andy Black – sound recordist
- Bill Stepanoski – editor
- Rob Cannon – editor

== Charts ==
Chart (2008)	Peak position
ARIA Music DVD Chart	12

== Certifications ==
Region	Certification	Certified units/sales
Australia (ARIA)	Gold	7,500^{^}
^{^} Shipments figures based on certification alone.
