= The Memphis Album =

Studio album by Guy Sebastian
- Released: 10 November 2007
- Recorded: August–October 2007
- Genre: Soul
- Label: Sony BMG
- Producers: Steve Cropper, Guy Sebastian

Guy Sebastian chronology
Closer to the Sun (2006)	The Memphis Album (2007)	Your Song (2007)

External videos
- Official music video: "In the Midnight Hour" on YouTube
- Official video: "On a Dusty Road" preview on YouTube

The Memphis Album is a cover album of Memphis soul songs by Australian singer Guy Sebastian released in Australia by Sony Music on 10 November 2007. The album was recorded at Ardent Studios in Memphis with Steve Cropper, Donald 'Duck' Dunn, Steve Potts (a.k.a. The M.G.'s), and Lester Snell. The M.G.'s were the Stax studio band who played on many of the original versions of the songs Sebastian recorded on the album. Steve Cropper was also a co-writer of three of the tracks, "In the Midnight Hour", "Knock on Wood" and "(Sittin' On) The Dock of the Bay". One original song written by Sebastian was included on the album. The Memphis Album debuted at No. 3 on the ARIA Albums Chart, spending eight weeks in the Top 10. It reached double platinum accreditation, and received a nomination for "Highest Selling Album" at the 2008 ARIA Music Awards.

== Development and recording ==
When Sebastian decided to record an album of Memphis soul classics it was suggested by Universal Music Publishing that Steve Cropper should be contacted to see if he would like to be involved. Cropper was interested, and he arranged for the other two members of The M.G.'s Donald 'Duck' Dunn and Steve Potts to participate. He also called in Lester Snell, who is a mainstay Memphis organ/keyboard player who has worked with artists including Eddie Floyd, David Porter and Isaac Hayes. The Memphis Album was recorded live on analogue tape at Ardent Studios Memphis in August 2007. The recording engineer Curry Weber explained the reason for this on AllMemphisMusic, an online Memphis radio station, "Going to tape is just such a richer and warmer tone when you hit it first of all. Not a lot of guys these days are talented enough to go to tape, cause it's so definitive and destructive. When you're on tape, it's on tape, and it's really hard to go in and fix a bunch of stuff like you can with computer these days."

Sebastian wrote about his time recording in Memphis in a series of blogs in Australian newspapers. "I started recording four days ago with the band members from Booker T and the MGs. And in the four days, we cut 15 tracks. It's been such a great experience to watch these guys work. [...] I would show them which song I wanted to record. After listening to any changes I had, we would all go into the live room. Everyone would hop to their instruments I'd hop in the vocal booth. We would just hit record button without a rehearsal and everyone would nail it nearly every time." Cropper later spoke on AllMemphisMusic about working with Sebastian. "Needless to say I've done a lot of things in my career, had a lot of fun, but we had more fun working with this young guy who just sings the rings around everything. [...] this kid came into Memphis, and just blew everybody's socks off. He had the grit and the grime and the soul of Otis Redding, and he had the sweet soul of Al Green, he had the wonderful sweet church sound of Sam Cooke, and he just took us by storm."

== Critical reception ==
The Memphis Album received many favourable reviews. Terry Reilly of The West Australian said, "To Memphis buffs these songs are the Holy Grail and outsiders such as the Malaysian-born Sebastian are not welcome. But even the hardest followers of songs caked in Memphis mud should bow generously to the subtleties in band performance and the singer's deft use of falsetto and depth of feeling." Bryan Patterson from the Herald Sun wrote, "Even the true Memphis buffs are crowing about Guy Sebastian's excellent work on such songs as Soul Man, Hold On, I'm Comin', In the Midnight Hour and (Sittin' On) The Dock of the Bay, accompanied by many of the revered musicians who played on the originals.[...] Sebastian nails the tunes. He's respectful yet unafraid to inject them with a joyous individuality." In a review on Allmusic, Laurie Mercer said although Sebastian was unable to capture the "nebulous vibe" of the original versions, what he "brings to the table is a wonderful voice, heartfelt respect, and skillful presentation. His range, style, and tone are all remarkable, and his technique so polished that it could be argued (at the risk of being blasphemous) that he occasionally improves on the original recordings". Ian Cuthbertson, a Weekend Australian reviewer wrote, "But some kind of alchemy has happened here.[...] he has lifted his bar to match the talent around him, pulling astonishing, authentic soul performances out of the depths. While his vocal performances are technically amazing, more impressively he has absolutely nailed the rhythm and spirit of the material."

== Release and promotion ==
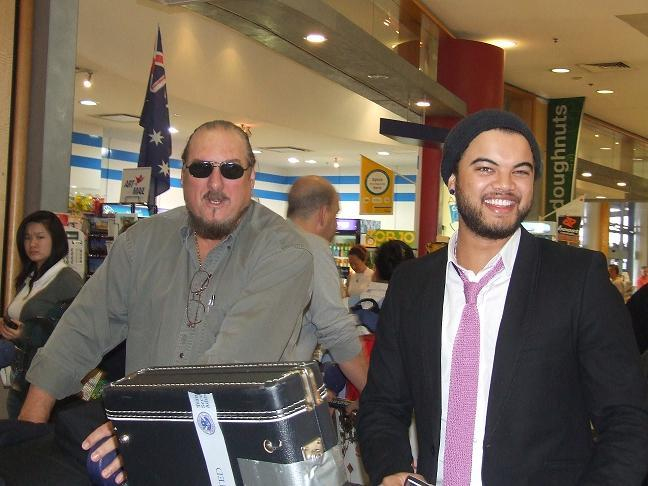
Guy Sebastian with Steve Cropper when The Mgs arrived in Australia for The Memphis Tour.

The Memphis Album was released on 10 November 2007. Although no singles were released, a video of "In the Midnight Hour" showing scenes of Sebastian recording with The MG's at Ardent Studio was released and shown on various TV music shows. Sebastian appeared on a music special on the Seven Network called Sunrise Presents: Your Song - Featuring Guy Sebastian. Over a period of weeks viewers were asked to vote for their favourite Memphis songs. On the special which aired on 4 December 2007, Sebastian performed the top six songs as voted by the public. Four of the songs, "Soul Man", "Under the Boardwalk", "(Sittin' On) The Dock of the Bay", and "Hold On, I'm Comin'" were on The Memphis Album. In early 2008 The MG's and Snell came to Australia to be Sebastian's backing band on his 18 date national concert tour. Prior to the start of the tour they performed with Sebastian on Channel 10's So You Think You Can Dance. One of the concerts was filmed and was released as a DVD/CD titled The Memphis Tour. The DVD also included "On A Dusty Road", a 20-minute documentary about the recording of The Memphis Album.

== Commercial performance ==
The Memphis Album debuted at No. 3 on the ARIA Album Chart. It spent eight weeks in the top 10, including three non-consecutive weeks at No. 3, and eighteen weeks in total in the top 50. It became the seventh highest selling Australian artist album in 2007 within seven weeks of release, and went on to achieve double platinum accreditation. The Memphis Album also received a nomination for "Highest Selling Album" at the 2008 ARIA Music Awards, Sebastian's third nomination in this category.

== Interest from the US ==
The recording of an album of soul classics by an Australian singer with some of the original musicians attracted attention in Memphis. Memphis Flyer, a weekly alternative newspaper, began covering the story in their "Daily Buzz" section in August 2007. In November, John Branston wrote, "A few weeks ago, we became enamored with a story about Australian Idol winner Guy Sebastian's sojourn here to record an album with some legendary Memphis musicians. Well, the album is out now and we decided to see what it sounded like, [...] We were somewhat surprised (being cynical Memphians) to discover that the little sonofagun can really sing. He nails these tunes." AllMemphisMusic, which specialises in playing songs originating in Memphis, began playing Sebastian's versions of the songs in December 2007. They also aired two special programs featuring Steve Cropper and others involved in The Memphis Album talking about recording it.

In April 2008 Eddie Floyd, the co-writer and original singer of "Knock on Wood", said in an interview about the resurgence of soul music with the Herald Sun, "That Aussie kid, Guy Sebastian, who has recorded an album in Memphis with the old soul men, well, he has everyone talking over here. That kid is great and everyone loves what he has done." Sebastian gained a contract to release The Memphis Album in the US in mid 2008. The album was later changed to a combination of songs from The Memphis Album and new original soul songs written by Sebastian, and was scheduled for release in mid 2009. The release was delayed when Victor Records, the subdivision of Sony America's Commercial Group Sebastian was signed to, underwent restructuring. Commercial Group later reaffirmed the album would be released in 2010. It no longer contains any of Sebastian's Memphis soul covers, but is the same as his original fifth Australian album Like It Like That and was released in the US on 29 June 2010.

== Track listing ==
No.	Title	Writer(s)	Length
1.	"Soul Man"	Isaac Hayes, David Porter	2:57
2.	"Hold On, I'm Comin'"	Samuel David Moore, David Prater	3:15
3.	"In the Midnight Hour"	Steve Cropper, Wilson Pickett	3:15
4.	"I Can't Stand the Rain"	Ann Peebles	3:58
5.	"Take Me to the River"	Mabon "Teenie" Hodges, Al Green	5:53
6.	"Knock on Wood"	Steve Cropper, Eddie Floyd	3:41
7.	"Respect Yourself"	Luther Ingram, Mack Rice	4:23
8.	"(Sittin' On) The Dock of the Bay"	Steve Cropper, Otis Redding	3:37
9.	"Hard to Handle"	Alvertis Isbell, Allen Jones, Otis Redding	2:52
10.	"Let's Stay Together"	Al Green, Willie Mitchell	4:10
11.	"I've Been Loving You Too Long"	Jerry Butler, Otis Redding	4:10
12.	"Hallelujah I Love Her So"	Ray Charles	3:24
13.	"I'd Like to Get to Know You"	Guy Sebastian	4:13
14.	"Under the Boardwalk"	Arthur Resnick, Kenny Young	5:00

== Personnel ==
Credits adapted from The Memphis Album liner notes.

- Guy Sebastian – vocals, producer, background vocal arrangements
- Steve Cropper – guitar, producer
- Donald Dunn, Dave Smith – bass
- Steve Potts – drums
- Lester Snell – piano, keys, horn arrangements
- Rick Steff – organ
- Jim Spake – tenor saxophone
- Kirk Smothers – baritone saxophone
- Scott Thompson – trumpet
- Howard Lamb – trombone
- Susan Marshall – background vocals
- Jackie Johnson – background vocals
- Carl Dimatago – additional guitar parts
- Curry Weber – recording engineer
- Alan Burcham – assistant engineer
- Steve Greenwell – mixing engineer

== Charts ==
=== Weekly charts ===
Chart (2007/08)	Peak position
Australian Albums (ARIA)	3

=== Year-end charts ===
Chart (2007)	Position
Australian Albums Chart	22
Australian Artist Albums Chart	7
Chart (2008)	Position
Australian Artist Albums Chart	30

== Certification ==
Region	Certification	Certified units/sales
Australia (ARIA)	2× Platinum	140,000^{^}
^{^} Shipments figures based on certification alone.

== Release history ==
Region	Date	Label	Format	Catalogue
Australia	10 November 2007	Sony Music	CD, digital download	88697196012
