= Bed of Clouds =

Single by Swift K.I.D. featuring Guy Sebastian

from the album Montré-all (EP)
- Released: 18 February 2013
- Genre: Pop
- Length: 3:50
- Label: Motto Beats
- Songwriter(s): Guy Sebastian, Mr Starz Up (Zeus Charalambous), Shaun Barrett, Keon Jermaine Alleyne, Ian Henry,

Swift K.I.D. singles chronology
"Hey Hey Hey (Pop Another Bottle)" (2011)	"Bed of Clouds" (2013)

Guy Sebastian singles chronology
"Get Along" (2012)	"Bed of Clouds" (2013)	"Dare to be Square" (2013)

"Bed of Clouds" is a song by Swift K.I.D. featuring Australian recording artist Guy Sebastian. It was released in Australia on 18 February 2013 and peaked at number 10 on the ARIA Singles Chart

The track is lifted from Swift K.I.D.’s forthcoming debut EP entitled Montré-all.

== Music video ==
The video premiered on 14 April 2013. It was directed by Kris Moyes.

== Track listing ==
- Digital download
1. "Bed of Clouds" – 3:50

== Charts ==
Chart (2013)	Peak position
Australia (ARIA)	10
