= 100 Times Around the Sun =

Studio album by Guy Sebastian
- Released: 8 August 2025
- Length: 44:58
- Label: Sony Australia
- Producer: Tushar Apte; Robby De Sá; Michael Fatkin; Lucian Nagy; Davis Naish; Oak; Louis Schoorl; Sebastian; Steve Solomon; Andrew Tufano; Cyrus Villanueva

Guy Sebastian chronology
T.R.U.T.H. (2020)	100 Times Around the Sun (2025)

Singles from 100 Times Around the Sun
- 1. "I Chose Good" Released: 4 August 2023; 2. "Antidote" Released: February 2024; 3. "No Reason to Stay" Released: 18 October 2024; 4. "Maybe" Released: 4 April 2025; 5. "Cupid" Released: 13 June 2025; 6. "Get It Done" Released: 4 July 2025; 7. "The Keys" Released: 7 November 2025; 8. "100 Times Around the Sun" Released: 13 February 2026

100 Times Around the Sun is the tenth studio album from Australian singer-songwriter Guy Sebastian. The album was announced in June 2025, alongside its fifth single "Cupid", and was released on August 8. 100 Times Around the Sun debuted at number two in Australia, and number 37 in New Zealand. With his compilation album Twenty Ten included, it is Sebastian's eleventh top ten album in Australia, and his sixth to peak inside the top three. It is also his sixth top 40 album in New Zealand.

== Writing and Development ==
Upon announcement of 100 Times Around the Sun, Sebastian said: "I have poured everything of myself into this album. It's an incredibly personal album that I wanted to feel full of love, life and joy. When I get to this point of finally being able to share it with you all, the nerves and excitement definitely hits." Although Sebastian developed the album on songwriting trips to Bali, Los Angeles and Nashville, much of it was recorded in his own studio in Sydney. Speaking of why it has been five years since his last album release, Sebastian said, "I know it’s been a long time"[... ] "but I don’t feel like I can go through enough life in a year or a year-and-a-half to make a whole body of work".

Sebastian said that the inspiration for the sadder songs on the album came from people close to him going through heartbreaking things, "Sometimes, someone will say something and it's a way I've never heard, like when a friend of yours is going through something and you've never heard grief or heartbreak articulated in that way."

As to the general theme of the album, Sebastian said "As you get older, you realise you can’t please everyone. And in the pursuit of doing so, you actually become nothing to everyone" [...] "I can just rest in this circle. And if I had a thousand lifetimes, a thousand times, one hundred times around the sun, I would want this same circle. And that’s pretty much what the album’s about".

== Reception ==
Sarah Duggan from The Music said "100 Times Around the Sun is a celebration of where he's been and a clear-eyed, soulful statement of where he is now. It's the perfect example of how music, at its best, brings people together, tells the stories we sometimes can't put into words and helps us dance (or cry) through it all. With this record, Sebastian is simply making music that feels good, from a place of honesty, joy and love, and in doing so, he continues to prove exactly why he's still one of Australia's most enduring and beloved voices."

== Tour ==
In August 2025, Sebastian announced a tour to support the album, commencing in Newcastle on 16 April 2026.

== Track listing ==
100 Times Around the Sun track listing
No.	Title	Writer(s)	Producer(s)	Length
1.	"Maybe"	Guy Sebastian; Robby De Sá; Ned Houston	De Sá	3:13
2.	"No Reason to Stay"	Sebastian; Steve Rusch	Sebastian; Steve Solomon	4:52
3.	"Strangers"	Sebastian; Davis Naish; Solomon	Naish; Solomon	3:05
4.	"100 Times Around the Sun"	Sebastian; Tushar Apte; Jamie Hartman	Sebastian; Apte	2:56
5.	"Write One"	Sebastian; Mitch Allen; Liz Rose	Sebastian	3:54
6.	"The Keys"	Sebastian; Sean Foreman; Ryan Marrone	Sebastian; Michael Fatkin	3:59
7.	"All Yours Again"	Sebastian; Ollie Green; Solomon	Solomon	2:47
8.	"Cupid"	Sebastian; Houston; Cyrus Villanueva	Sebastian	3:51
9.	"I Chose Good"	Sebastian; Warren Felder; Chelsea Warner	Oak	2:46
10.	"Get It Done"	Sebastian; Green; Michelle Leonard; Lucian Nagy	Nagy	3:02
11.	"Antidote" (featuring Sam Fischer)	Sebastian; Sam Fischer; Houston; David Tweedie; Villanueva	Sebastian; Fatkin; Villanueva	4:22
12.	"See You There" (with Riley Biederer)	Sebastian; Houston; Andrew Tufano	Tufano	3:05
13.	"Afterlife"	Sebastian; Houston; Louis Schoorl	Schoorl	2:42
Total length:				44:58

== Personnel ==
Credits adapted from Tidal.

=== Musicians ===
- Guy Sebastian – vocals (all tracks), guitar (tracks 2, 5, 8); drums, keyboards (8)
- Xander – strings (1, 4, 5)
- Aliandro Prowl – keyboards (2, 4, 5, 7, 11, 13)
- Brandon Winbush – background vocals (2, 7, 9, 11, 13)
- Davis Simmons, Jr. – background vocals (2, 7, 9, 11, 13)
- Keisha Renee – background vocals (2, 7, 9, 11, 13)
- Mia Pfirrman – background vocals (2, 7, 9, 11, 13)
- Steve Solomon – guitar (3)
- Joel Burton – bass (4, 8)
- Jubu – guitar (4, 13)
- David Tweedie – guitar (5)
- Phil Turcio – keyboards (6)
- Oscar Linnander – bass, guitar (9)
- Bobbie Lee Stamper – guitar (10)
- Ollie Green – keyboards (10)
- Craig Brockman – Hammond organ (11, 13)
- Sam Fischer – vocals (11)
- Riley Biederer – vocals (12)

=== Technical ===
- Miles Walker – mixing
- Leon Zervos – mastering
- Robby De Sá – engineering (1)
- Guy Sebastian – engineering (2, 4–6, 8, 11)
- Justin Stanley – engineering (2, 7, 11, 13)
- Davis Naish – engineering (3)
- Steve Solomon – engineering (3, 7)
- Michael Fatkin – engineering (6)
- Oscar Linnander – engineering (9)
- Lucian Nagy – engineering (10)
- Andrew Tufano – engineering (12)
- Louis Schoorl – engineering (13)

== Charts ==
=== Weekly charts ===
Chart performance for 100 Times Around the Sun
Chart (2025)	Peak position
Australian Albums (ARIA)	2
New Zealand Albums (RMNZ)	37

=== Year-end charts ===
Year-end chart performance for 100 Times Around the Sun
Chart (2025)	Position
Australian Artist Albums (ARIA)	13
