= Believer (Guy Sebastian song) =

Single by Guy Sebastian

from the album T.R.U.T.H.
- Released: 20 August 2021
- Length: 3:40
- Label: Sony
- Songwriters: Guy Sebastian; David Hodges; Steve Solomon
- Producers: David Hodges; Steve Solomon

Guy Sebastian singles chronology
"Broken Humans" (2021)	"Believer" (2021)

Music video
- "Believer" on YouTube

"Believer" is a song by Australian singer Guy Sebastian, released on 20 August 2021 as the seventh single from his ninth studio album T.R.U.T.H.. Sebastian performed a pre-recorded version of "Believer" during the semi-final of The Voice (Australian season 10) which aired on 5 September 2021. The song peaked at number 69 on the ARIA the following week.

Via social media, Sebastian said "'Believer' is a really special song to me, written for my Jules. When I performed this as part of the Ridin' with You tour, I heard from so many of you that you loved this one".

== Music video ==
The music video for "Believer" was released on 20 August 2021. It was directed by ARIA Award winning director, James Chappell.

== Charts ==
Chart (2021)	Peak position
Australia (ARIA)	69

== Certifications ==
Certifications for "Believer"
Region	Certification	Certified units/sales
Australia (ARIA)	Gold	35,000^{‡}
^{‡} Sales+streaming figures based on certification alone.
