= Love on Display =

Single by Guy Sebastian

from the album T.R.U.T.H.
- Released: 25 September 2020
- Length: 3:03
- Label: Sony
- Songwriter(s): Guy Sebastian; Julian Bunetta; John Ryan II
- Producer(s): M-Phazes

Guy Sebastian singles chronology
"Standing with You" (2020)	"Love on Display" (2020)	"Only Thing Missing" (2021)

Music video
- "Love on Display" on YouTube

'"Love on Display'" is a song by Australian singer Guy Sebastian, released on 25 September 2020 as the fifth single from his ninth studio album T.R.U.T.H.. The song peaked at number 61 on the Aria Charts, and has been certified platinum. At the 2022 APRA Music Awards, the song was nominated for Most Performed Australian Work and Most Performed Pop Work.

== Background ==
Sebastian told Entertainment Focus "This song is all about expressing your love – don't hold it back, don't hide it, wear it out there for the world to see. It's a fun song that I hope make people happy." Upon release, Sebastian said "I knew that the song needed a certain feeling and it needed to get to a certain place where there was this energy, and I just could not get it to a point where it felt really, really right. We tried so many different versions of this song... and then I did what I always do when I'm in that situation, I flicked it onto M-Phazes [who] worked his magic and got some really great playing on there".

== Music video ==
The music video for "Love on Display" was released on 21 October 2020. It was directed by ARIA Award winning director, James Chappell.

== Charts ==
Chart (2020)	Peak position
Australia (ARIA)	61

== Certifications ==
Certifications for "Love on Display"
Region	Certification	Certified units/sales
Australia (ARIA)	Platinum	70,000^{‡}
^{‡} Sales+streaming figures based on certification alone.
