= Maybe (Guy Sebastian song) =

Single by Guy Sebastian

from the album 100 Times Around the Sun
- Released: 4 April 2025
- Length: 3:12
- Label: Sony
- Songwriters: Guy Sebastian; Robby De Sá; Ned Houston
- Producer: Robby De Sá

Guy Sebastian singles chronology
"No Reason to Stay" (2024)	"Maybe" (2025)	"Cupid" (2025)

"Maybe" is a song by Australian singer Guy Sebastian, released on 4 April 2025 as the fourth single from his tenth studio album 100 Times Around the Sun. At the APRA Music Awards of 2026, the song won Most Performed Australian Work and Most Performed Pop Work.

== Charts ==
Chart (2025)	Peak position
Australia Digital (ARIA)	1
