= Just as I Am (Guy Sebastian album) =

Studio album by Guy Sebastian
- Released: 8 December 2003
- Length: 48:12
- Label: Sony BMG
- Producers: John Foreman; Mark Holden; Bryan Jones; Jarrad Rogers

Guy Sebastian chronology
Just as I Am (2003)	Beautiful Life (2004)

Singles from Just as I Am
- 1. "Angels Brought Me Here" Released: 24 November 2003; 2. "All I Need Is You" Released: February 2004

Just as I Am is the debut album by Australian singer Guy Sebastian, the inaugural winner of Australian Idol. The album was released in December 2003, and debuted at number one in Australia, and achieved 6× platinum certification. Two number one singles were released from the album, "Angels Brought Me Here and "All I Need Is You. The album also charted at number three in New Zealand, and achieved double platinum certification there. Sebastian has gone on to release a further ten top ten albums in Australia, including another two number ones. He has also released five more top 50 albums in New Zealand.

== Development ==
Given the relative popularity of Australian Idol in late 2003, BMG Australia subsequently contracted Sebastian for a record before Christmas 2003. He wanted to record a mixture of pop and R&B material. Guy Sebastian co-wrote three of the songs on the album "All I Need Is You", "I 4 U" and "Something Don't Feel Right". He says on his web page: "I think the credibility in having your own stuff makes you as an artist. Credibility is what I've always strived for and I couldn't imagine my first record not having one of my songs on it." The album also features cover versions of "What a Wonderful World" by Louis Armstrong, "Can You Stand the Rain" by New Edition and "When Doves Cry" by Prince.

== Commercial performance ==
The first single from the album, "Angels Brought Me Here", debuted at number one and was the highest selling single in Australia in 2003. "Angels Brought Me Here" went on to earn five platinum accreditations and win the 2004 ARIA Award for Highest Selling Single. In January 2010 it was announced as the highest selling song of the 2000 to 2009 decade by ARIA, finishing ahead of Anthony Callea's cover version of "The Prayer".

Just as I Am was released in December 2003 and debuted at number one in Australia, selling 163,711 copies in its first week. This remains the second highest ever one week sales for any album in ARIA chart history. Just as I Am became the 5th highest selling album in Australia in 2003 within three weeks of release. It reached 6× platinum, and eventually sold in excess of 480,000 units. It received a nomination for highest selling album at the 2004 ARIA Awards. Just as I Am places #28 on ARIA's list of highest selling albums of the 2000 to 2009 decade, the ninth highest entry for an Australian artist, and the highest for an Australian Idol contestant. The second single "All I Need Is You" also debuted at number one in the Australian charts and was certified platinum.

"Angels Brought Me Here" also reached number one in four Asian countries and New Zealand, and was certified platinum in New Zealand. Just as I Am was released in New Zealand, where it peaked at number three and achieved double platinum certification. "All I Need is You" peaked at number five there.

== Track listing ==
Just as I Am track listing
No.	Title	Writer(s)	Producer(s)	Length
1.	"Angels Brought Me Here"	Jörgen Elofsson; John Reid	Bryon Jones; Adam Reily^{[a]}	3:47
2.	"So I"	Jamie Jones; Jack Kugell; Jason Pennock	Jones; The Heavyweights	3:47
3.	"Can You Stand the Rain"	James Harris III; Terry Lewis	Jones; Reily	3:47
4.	"No One Can Compare (To You)"	Jones; Martin Kember; Kugell; Pennock; Monty Neuble	Jones; The Heavyweights; Neuble	3:47
5.	"All I Need Is You"	Guy Sebastian; Reily; Alun Firth	Jones; Reily; Ramesh Sathiah^{[a]}; Song Zu^{[a]}	3:47
6.	"What a Wonderful World"	Bob Thiele; George David Weiss	Mark Holden; Reily	3:47
7.	"My Beautiful Friend"	Reily	Jones; Reily	3:47
8.	"Something Don't Feel Right"	Sebastian; Alexander Laurie; Reily	Jones; Reily	3:47
9.	"When Doves Cry"	Prince	John Foreman	3:47
10.	"Just as I Am"	Michael Fallon; Mark Niedzwiedz	Michael Szumowski	3:47
11.	"3 Words"	Todd Chapman; Shelly Peiken; C. Mendoza	Szumowski	3:47
12.	"I 4 U"	Sebastian; Gary Pinto; Jarrad Rogers	Rogers; Jones	3:47
Total length:				48:20

Notes

- ^{^[a]} signifies an additional/co-producer(s)

== Charts ==
=== Weekly charts ===
Weekly chart performance for Just as I Am
Chart (2003/04)	Peak position
Australian Albums (ARIA)	1
New Zealand Albums (RMNZ)	3

=== Year-end charts ===
2003 year-end chart performance for Just as I Am
Chart (2003)	Position
Australian Albums Chart	5
Australian Artist Albums Chart	3

2004 year-end chart performance for Just as I Am
Chart (2004)	Position
Australian Albums Chart	19
Australian Artist Albums Chart	8

=== Decade-end charts ===
Decade-end chart performance for Just as I Am
Chart (2000–2009)	Position
Australian Albums Chart	28
Australian Artist Albums Chart	8

== Certification ==
Certifications for Just as I Am
Region	Certification	Certified units/sales
Australia (ARIA)	6× Platinum	420,000^{^}
New Zealand (RMNZ)	2× Platinum	30,000^{^}
^{^} Shipments figures based on certification alone.

== Release history ==
Just as I Am release history
Region	Date	Format(s)	Label	Catalog	Ref.
Australia	8 December 2003	CD; digital download	Sony BMG	82876587792	
