= Dare to Be Square =

Single by Guy Sebastian
- Released: 1 October 2013
- Recorded: 2013
- Genre: Pop
- Length: 3:11
- Label: Sony
- Songwriter: Guy Sebastian

Guy Sebastian singles chronology
"Bed of Clouds" (2013)	"Dare to Be Square" (2013)	"Like a Drum" (2013)

"Dare to Be Square" is a song written and recorded by Australian artist Guy Sebastian. It was recorded to raise awareness for Nickelodeon's anti-bullying campaign with all money raised going towards Kids Helpline.

The single was at the forefront of Nickelodeon's "Dare to Be Square" campaign, which encourages children to say no to bullying and embrace their individuality.

The song peaked at #73 in Australia.

== Background ==
Figures released by the Kids Helpline reveal mental health issues are increasingly worrying Australian children and Australia-wide, people aged 5 to 25 were more likely to be concerned with family relationships, physical and mental health concerns than before.

It was announced in August 2013 that Guy Sebastian, who had recently quit his judging role on The X Factor, had penned a new tune to support Nickelodeon's anti-bullying campaign, titled "Dare to Be Square!" Sebastian was prompted to write the tune after his 17-month-old son was punched by a bigger child during a park outing.

"I didn't suffer from bullying when I was a kid but I think about it a lot now because of Hudson," Sebastian said.

Kids Helpline General Manager said the Dare to Be Square campaign's message of celebrating individuality and self-acceptance will make a real difference to kids across Australia. "There is an undeniable synergy between Nickelodeon's SpongeBob SquarePants, Dare to Be Square and Kids Helpline. Our counsellors speak with children and young people every day about issues that are affecting them."

== Track listing ==
Digital download
No.	Title	Length
1.	"Dare to Be Square"	3:11

== Music video ==
A video was released for the track.

== Promotion ==
Sebastian performed "Dare to Be Square" in front of thousands on 27 September at Nickelodeon's second annual SLIMEFEST in Sydney. This was televised exclusively on Nickelodeon on Monday 30 September.

== Charts ==
Chart (2013)	Peak position
Australia (ARIA)	73
