= Paces (musician) =

- Birth name: Mikey Perry
- Origin: Gold Coast, Queensland, Australia
- Genres: Electronica; electropop
- Occupations: Record producer; musician
- Years active: 2013–present
- Labels: Etcetc, Island Records Australia
- Website: www.pacesmusic.com

Mikey Perry, better known by his stage name Paces, is an Australian record producer and musician. His debut studio album, Vacation, was released in March 2016 and received positive reviews. Paces toured the album across Australia and New Zealand throughout May and June 2016.

In June 2023, Paces released "Brain Got Hands", a song about dealing with depression.

Paces has produced tracks for Tkay Maidza, Safia, Kilter, Danny T, Rattraps, Sietta, Parachute Youth, YesYou and Sampology.

== Discography ==
=== Albums ===
Title	Album details
Vacation	Release date: 4 March 2016; Label: Etcetc; Format: Digital download
Zag	Release date: 24 August 2018; Label: Etcetc (ETCETCD071); Format: Digital download, streaming, CD, LP

=== Singles ===
List of singles
Title	Year	Album
"The Pact"	2013	Non-album singles
"On My Mind" (featuring Youth)	2014	Non-album singles
"Nothing's Forever" (featuring Kučka)	2015	Vacation
"Hold It Down"	2015	Non-album single
"Bamboo"	2015	Non-album single
"1993 (No Chill)" (featuring Jess Kent)	2016	Vacation
"Work Me Out" (featuring Rye Rye)	2016	Vacation
"Desert" (featuring Guy Sebastian)	2016	Vacation
"Sometimes" (featuring Esther Sparks)	2016	Vacation
"Savage" (featuring NYNE)	2017	Zag
"Creepin"	2017	Zag
"Going Mad" (featuring Clypso & Raven Felix)	2018	Zag
"Don't Run" (featuring Doolie)	2018	Zag
"Call the 5-0" (featuring Midas.Gold, Tigerilla & Health Club)	2018	Zag
"Siren" (featuring Guy Sebastian)	2018	Zag
"Technique"	2018	Zag
"Vertigo" (with Yorke)	2019	Non-album singles
"Dear Driver" (featuring Muki)	2020	Non-album singles
"Back Around" (featuring Sarah Saint James)	2020	Non-album singles
"Boyfriend" (with Dayliites and Cloe Terare)	2020	Non-album singles
"Losing My Head" (featuring Truples)	2020	Non-album singles
"Goodbyes" (with Dayliites and Cloe Terare)	2020	Non-album singles
"Adrift"	2022	Non-album singles
"Butterflies"	2022	Non-album singles
"Brain Got Hands"	2023	Non-album singles

== Awards and nominations ==
=== AIR Awards ===
The Australian Independent Record Awards (commonly known informally as AIR Awards) is an annual awards night to recognise, promote and celebrate the success of Australia's Independent Music sector.

Year	Nominee / work	Award	Result
2019	Zag	Best Independent Dance/Electronic Album	Nominated
