= Your Song (EP) =

EP by Guy Sebastian
- Released: 6 December 2007
- Genres: Pop, soul
- Label: Sony BMG

Guy Sebastian chronology
The Memphis Album (2007)	Your Song (2007)	The Memphis Tour (2008)

Your Song is a digital extended play by Australian pop singer Guy Sebastian. It features live versions of four songs from his 2007 soul covers album The Memphis Album, and an additional two extra covers. It was released on 6 December 2007 on Sony BMG.

== Track listing ==
No.	Title	Writer(s)	Length
1.	"Soul Man" (live)	Isaac Hayes, David Porter	3:07
2.	"Under the Boardwalk" (live)	Arthur Resnick, Kenny Young	3:28
3.	"You'll Never Walk Alone" (live)	Richard Rodgers, Oscar Hammerstein II	4:09
4.	"Oh Pretty Woman" (live)	Roy Orbison, Bill Dees	2:57
5.	"(Sittin' On) The Dock of the Bay" (live)	Steve Cropper, Otis Redding	3:34
6.	"Hold On, I'm Comin'" (live)	Samuel David Moore, David Prater	2:56
