= T.R.U.T.H. =

Studio album by Guy Sebastian
- Released: 16 October 2020
- Recorded: 2018–2020
- Length: 41:22
- Label: Sony Australia
- Producers: Afterhrs; Trevor Brown; DNA; David Ryan Harris; Jamie Hartman; David Hodges; Zaire Koalo; M-Phazes; Guy Sebastian; Shungudzo; Steve Solomon

Guy Sebastian chronology
Conscious (2017)	T.R.U.T.H. (2020)	100 Times Around the Sun (2025)

Singles from T.R.U.T.H.
- 1. "Before I Go" Released: 2 November 2018; 2. "Choir" Released: 31 May 2019; 3. "Let Me Drink" Released: 15 November 2019; 4. "Standing with You" Released: 26 June 2020; 5. "Love on Display" Released: 25 September 2020; 6. "Only Thing Missing" Released: 26 February 2021; 7. "Believer" Released: 20 August 2021

T.R.U.T.H. is the ninth studio album from Australian singer-songwriter Guy Sebastian. It was released on 16 October 2020. T.R.U.T.H. debuted at number one, Sebastian's third number album. With his compilation album Twenty Ten included, it was his tenth top ten album in Australia. It reached platinum certification in 2023. Two top ten multi platinum singles were released from the album, "Choir" which was certified 6× platinum, and "Standing with You" which gained 2× platinum certification. Sebastian was nominated for a number of ARIA and APRA awards for songs from the album.

== Writing and Development ==
Sebastian said about T.R.U.T.H., "I wanted to create something that was about my life, the things that I've been through and my truths. [...] More than anything I've learned the importance of having the right team around you, and what great things can be achieved when you do." "Before I Go", co written with Jamie Hartman, is "about self belief and taking control of your own destiny and legacy regardless of the limitations people or obstacles in your path may place over you." Sebastian said, "This was the very first song I wrote when I sat down to start this new album and it says so much about what I was feeling at the time".

"Choir" is dedicated to Sebastian's close friend and musical collaborator Luke Liang, who died following a battle with mental health. The song was originally a ballad, but Sebastian changed it into "an upbeat, poignant song about the choir of voices Liang has joined in death, and the choir of voices "keeping his light alive" on earth."

"Standing With You" was another song co written with Hartman. It was written just before the COVID-19-related travel bans came into effect. Sebastian said "Recently it has felt like everyone around me has directly or indirectly been touched by mental health issues." He said "So this song is for those people in my life, but also for everyone feeling anxious in this new world and especially our current situation."

== Singles ==
"Before I Go" was released as the album's lead single on 2 November 2018 and peaked at number 43 on the ARIA singles chart. It was certified 2× platinum in Australia and platinum in Netherlands.

"Choir" was released on 31 May 2019 The song peaked at number 7 on the ARIA singles chart and was certified 6× platinum in Australia and platinum in New Zealand. At the ARIA Music Awards of 2019, the song won Video of the Year and Song of the Year.

"Let Me Drink" was released on 15 November 2019 and features The HamilTones and Wale. Although it didn't enter the Aria chart it was certified gold in 2023.

"Standing with You" was released on 26 June 2020. The song peaked at number 10 on the ARIA singles chart. It was certified 2× platinum in Australia and gold in New Zealand.

"Love on Display" was released on 25 September 2020 as the album's fifth single. It peaked at 61, and was certified platinum.

"Only Thing Missing" was sent to radio on 26 February 2021 as the album's sixth single.

"Believer" was released on 20 August 2021 as the album's seventh single. The official music video premiered the same day. It reached 69, and was cerified gold.

=== Promotional singles ===
"If He Won't" was released on 11 September 2020, the same day the album became available for pre-order as the album's first promotional single.

== Critical reception ==
Tyler Jenke of Tone Deaf said "..with T.R.U.T.H. serving at Guy's ninth album, it sounds as though we're once again witnessing the start of something beautiful, with his soulful, powerful sound proving it is not only as mesmerising as ever, but that there is truly no stopping a stunning artist such as Guy Sebastian." While Alexander Pan, also from Tone Deaf, said "T.R.U.T.H., shows just why he is one of Australia's leading artists. We all know how good of a singer he is, yet Guy is still somehow improving on, well, everything as his soulful ninth studio album demonstrates how he just keeps getting better with each new release."

Broadway World said: "Although T.R.U.T.H. materialised in spurts - during various sessions with songwriters in different geographical locations across a two-and-a-half-year period - it's undeniably Sebastian's most cohesive-sounding album to date."

=== Accolades ===
Sebastian received a number of award nominations for the songs from the album. He was nominated for Best Male Artist and Best Pop Release for "Choir" at the 2019 ARIA Music Awards, and the song won Best Video and Song of the Year. In 2020 Sebastian received an Aria nomination for Best Male Artist for "Standing With You", and the song won the ARIA Award for Best Video. In 2021 M-Phazes was nominated for Producer of the Year for T.R.U.T.H.

At the 2020 APRA Awards "Choir" received nominations for Song of the Year, Most Performed Australian Work, and Most Performed Pop Work. The following year "Standing With You" was nominated for Song of the Year, and "Let Me Drink" for Most Performed Pop Work. In 2022 "Love on Display" received nominations for Most performed Australian work, and Most Performed Pop Work.

== Commercial performance ==
On 21 October 2020, Australian Recording Industry Association (ARIA) announced in their mid-week report that the album was in contention to debut at number 1 on the ARIA Albums Chart. On 24 October 2020, T.R.U.T.H debuted at number one in Australia on the ARIA Albums Chart for the chart dated 26 October 2020. The album became his first number one album in seven years (his last being Armageddon in December 2012) and his third overall.

In New Zealand, the album debuted and peaked at number 39 on the New Zealand Top 40 Albums Chart for the chart dated 26 October 2020.

== Track listing ==
T.R.U.T.H. track listing
No.	Title	Writer(s)	Producer(s)	Length
1.	"Before I Go"	Guy Sebastian; David Hodges; Jamie Hartman	Hartman	3:29
2.	"Believer"	Guy Sebastian; Hodges; Steve Solomon	Hodges; Solomon	3:45
3.	"Choir"	Guy Sebastian; Trevor Brown; William Zaire Simmons	Guy Sebastian; M-Phazes; Brown; Zaire Koalo	2:53
4.	"I'm Your Man"	David Ryan Harris; Sarah Aarons; David Musumeci; Anthony Egizii	Harris; DNA	3:41
5.	"Standing with You"	Guy Sebastian; Greg Holden; Hartman	Hartman	3:53
6.	"Only Thing Missing"	Guy Sebastian; Isabella Kearney-Nurse; Brown; Simmons	Brown; Koalo	2:41
7.	"Love on Display"	Guy Sebastian; Julian Bunetta; John Ryan II	M-Phazes	3:03
8.	"Who I Love"	Guy Sebastian; Ryan II; Andrew Haas	Afterhrs	4:04
9.	"In a World" (featuring Shungudzo)	Guy Sebastian; Alexandra Govere	Hartman; Shungudzo	3:29
10.	"Let Me Drink" (featuring The HamilTones and Wale)	Guy Sebastian; Mark Landon; Olubowale Victor Akintimehin	M-Phazes	2:40
11.	"If He Won't"	Guy Sebastian; Tobias Jesso Jr	Solomon	3:20
12.	"Fantasize"	Guy Sebastian; Brown; Simmons	Brown; Koalo	4:24
Total length:				41:22

== Charts ==
=== Weekly charts ===
Weekly chart performance for T.R.U.T.H.
Chart (2020)	Peak position
Australian Albums (ARIA)	1
New Zealand Albums (RMNZ)	39

=== Year-end charts ===
2020 year-end chart performance for T.R.U.T.H.
Chart (2020)	Position
Australian Albums (ARIA)	23

2021 year-end chart performance for T.R.U.T.H.
Chart (2021)	Position
Australian Albums (ARIA)	44

== Certifications ==
Region	Certification	Certified units/sales
Australia (ARIA)	Platinum	70,000^{‡}
^{‡} Sales+streaming figures based on certification alone.

== Release history ==
T.R.U.T.H. release details
Region	Date	Formats	Refs.
Various	16 October 2020	• CD • digital download • streaming	
Australia	11 December 2020	LP	
