= Choir (song) =

Single by Guy Sebastian

from the album T.R.U.T.H.
- Released: 31 May 2019
- Length: 2:51
- Label: Sony Music Australia
- Songwriters: Trevor Brown; Zaire Koalo; Sebastian
- Producer: M-Phazes

Guy Sebastian singles chronology
"Before I Go" (2018)	"Choir" (2019)	"Let Me Drink" (2019)

Alan Walker singles chronology
"Play" (2019)	"Choir (Remix)" (2019)	"Ghost" (2019)

Alternative cover
- Remix cover

Music video
- "Choir" on YouTube "Choir (Remix)" on YouTube

"Choir" is a song by Australian singer Guy Sebastian. It was released on 31 May 2019 as the second single from Sebastian's ninth studio album T.R.U.T.H.. An official remix by Norwegian music producer Alan Walker was released on 27 September 2019. The song peaked at number 7 in the Australian Singles Chart, Sebastian's 13th top 10 single in Australia. It spent 28 weeks in the top 50, and was certified 6× platinum in 2023. Although it didn't enter the New Zealand charts it reached platinum certification there.

== Background ==
The song is dedicated to Sebastian's close friend and musical collaborator Luke Liang, who died following a battle with mental health. He said Luke's death "was very unexpected. In fact, I'd actually done a gig with Luke, who passed away, just before I left for LA. And I could sense that something wasn't quite right... It was very hard to process and it still is." The song was originally a ballad, but Sebastian changed it into "an upbeat, poignant song about the choir of voices Liang has joined in death, and the choir of voices "keeping his light alive" on earth." Sebastian performed an acoustic version of the song on 60 Minutes.

== Accolades ==
At the ARIA Music Awards of 2019, the song was nominated for four awards; Best Male Artist, Best Pop Release, Video of the Year and Song of the Year, winning the latter two. "Choir" was also nominated for Song of the Year, Most Performed Australian Work of the Year and Most Performed Pop Work of the Year at the APRA Music Awards of 2020.

== Music video ==
The music video for "Choir" was directed by James Chappell and released on YouTube on 17 June 2019. It has over 7.8 million views as of November 2022. The remix video was also released on 27 September 2019 through Alan Walker's YouTube channel. It was filmed in a church in Newtown, a bus depot in Marrickville and Sea Cliff Bridge, Wollongong.

== Track listings ==
Digital download
No.	Title	Length
1.	"Choir"	2:51

Digital download – remix
No.	Title	Length
1.	"Choir (remix)" (with Alan Walker)	3:28

Digital download
No.	Title	Length
1.	"Choir (alt. version)" (with Samantha Jade)	3:28

== Credits and personnel ==
Credits adapted from Tidal.

Original version

- M-Phazes – production

Remix version

- M-Phazes – production
- Downtown Trevor Brown – production
- Guy Sebastian – production, composition, lyrics
- Zaire Koalo – production, composition, lyrics
- Miles Walker – mix engineering
- Alan Walker – remixer

== Charts ==
=== Weekly charts ===
Chart (2019)	Peak position
Australia (ARIA)	7
New Zealand Hot Singles (RMNZ)	40

=== Year-end charts ===
Chart (2019)	Position
Australia (ARIA)	36
Chart (2020)	Position
Australia (ARIA)	99

== Certifications ==
Region	Certification	Certified units/sales
Australia (ARIA)	6× Platinum	420,000^{‡}
New Zealand (RMNZ)	Platinum	30,000^{‡}
^{‡} Sales+streaming figures based on certification alone.

== Release history ==
Region	Date	Format	Version	Label	Reference	Ref.
Various	31 May 2019	Digital download; streaming	Original	Sony Music Australia	886447708453	
Various	27 September 2019	Digital download; streaming	Remix (with Alan Walker)	Sony Music Australia	Unknown	
