= Come Home with Me (song) =

Single by Guy Sebastian

from the album Madness
- Released: 8 August 2014
- Genre: Pop
- Length: 3:24
- Label: Sony
- Songwriter(s): Guy Sebastian; Britt Burton; Mario Marchetti
- Producer(s): Sebastian; Marchetti

Guy Sebastian singles chronology
"Like a Drum" (2013)	"Come Home with Me" (2014)	"Mama Ain't Proud" (2014)

Music video
- "Come Home with Me" on YouTube

"Come Home with Me" is a song by Australian recording artist Guy Sebastian, released digitally in Australia on 8 August 2014. It debuted at number 13 on the ARIA Singles Chart and has been certified platinum. The video was released on August 12 via VEVO.

== Release and promotion ==
Sebastian performed the song live on The X Factor Australia results show on August 11.

== Track listing ==
- Digital download
1. "Come Home with Me" – 3:24
- CD single
1. "Come Home with Me"
2. "Battle Scars" (acoustic)
3. "Like a Drum" (Chainsmokers Remix)

catalogue:88875007392

== Charts ==
=== Weekly charts ===
Chart (2014)	Peak position
Australia (ARIA)	13

=== Year-end chart ===
Chart (2014)	Position
Australian Artist Singles Chart	27

== Certifications ==
Region	Certification	Certified units/sales
Australia (ARIA)	Platinum	70,000^{‡}
^{‡} Sales+streaming figures based on certification alone.

== Release history ==
Region	Date	Format	Label
Australia	8 August 2014	Digital download	Sony Music Australia
Australia	29 August 2014	CD single	Sony Music Australia

== Awards ==
Australian Recording Industry Association Awards

Year	Nominee / work	Award	Result
2014	"Come Home with Me"	Best Male Artist	Nominated

* Note: The 2014 ARIA Award ceremony is due to take place on 26 November 2014. Final nominees were announced on 7 October.
