= Desert (Paces song) =

Single by Paces featuring Guy Sebastian

from the album Vacation
- Released: 15 August 2016
- Genre: Pop
- Length: 3:24
- Label: Etcetc
- Songwriter(s): Alexander Burnett: Jessica Higgs; Samuel Blue May; Mikey Perry

Paces (musician) singles chronology
"Work Me Out" (2016)	"Desert" (2016)	"Sometimes" (2016)

Guy Sebastian singles chronology
"Black & Blue" (2015)	"Desert" (2016)	"Candle" (2016)

Music video
- "Desert" on YouTube

"Desert" is a song by Australian record producer Paces featuring Australian recording artist Guy Sebastian. The song was released in August 2016 as the fourth single from Paces debut studio album, Vacation (2016).

== Background and release ==
Sebastian said he'd been a fan of Paces “for a while” and contacted him in 2015 to write together. Paces remixed Sebastian's 2015 single "Black & Blue" which was released in January 2016. Paces sent Sebastian "Desert" on which he recorded his vocals.

In February 2016 Paces announced the track list for his debut studio album, which was released in March 2016, and it included Guy Sebastian on "Desert".

On 20 May 2016, Paces and Sebastian performed LDRU's "Keeping Score" on Triple J's Like a Version to critical acclaim. It was Sebastian’s debut on Triple J.

In July 2016, Sebastian performed with Paces at Splendour in the Grass. Sebastian said "I was scared, I've gotta be honest. I think I go there feeling like I'm gonna be judged so I get nervous and I'm a bit self-doubting…" adding once he was on stage "everyone in the crowd starting cheering and stuff and it almost gave me this sense of relief." This performance was met with acclaim and the performance became the film clip and the single was released a few weeks later.

== Music video ==
The music video for "Desert" premiered on YouTube on 14 August 2016. It was filmed and edited by Patrick Rohl and Sam Bratby and recorded at Splendour in the Grass in July 2016.

== Reception ==
In an album review, AAA Backstage said “"Desert" begins with beautiful key chords and Sebastian's soulful voice. Paces, being the clever electronic music man he is, altered Sebastian's voice into dark strawberry jam richness impossible to ignore.”

== Track listing ==
Digital download
No.	Title	Length
1.	"Desert"	3:24
2.	"Desert" (Junior Sanchez radio mix)	3:14
3.	"Desert" (Junior Sanchez extended vocal mix)	4:48
4.	"Desert" (Junior Sanchez extended instrumental mix)	4:48
5.	"Desert" (Junior Sanchez dub)	5:30
6.	"Desert" (Airwolf remix)	5:02
7.	"Desert" (Arona Mane remix)	3:24
8.	"Desert" (Health Club remix)	5:27

== Charts ==
Chart (2016)	Position
Australian Club Track Chart	23
