= Madness (Guy Sebastian album) =

Studio album by Guy Sebastian
- Released: 21 November 2014
- Recorded: 2014
- Genres: Pop; R&B
- Label: Sony Music Australia

Guy Sebastian chronology
Armageddon (2012)	Madness (2014)	Part 1 (2016)

Singles from Madness
- 1. "Like a Drum" Released: 25 October 2013; 2. "Come Home with Me" Released: 8 August 2014; 3. "Mama Ain't Proud" Released: 17 October 2014; 4. "Linger" Released: 1 December 2014

Madness is the seventh studio album from Australian singer-songwriter Guy Sebastian. The album was released on 21 November 2014. It debuted at number six on the ARIA Charts, and was certified gold. With his compilation album Twenty Ten included, it was Sebastian's eighth consecutive top ten album in Australia. Four top 20 singles were released from the album: "Like a Drum", "Come Home with Me", "Mama Ain't Proud" featuring 2 Chainz and "Linger" which features Lupe Fiasco. Sebastian was nominated for two ARIA Music Awards in 2014, Best Male Artist for "Come Home with Me" and Song of the Year for "Like a Drum".

== Background and development ==
Sebastian wrote the songs for Madness with a number of different songwriters, with the exception of "Elephant", "Alive" and "One of Us" which he wrote alone. The album is eclectic, with a mixture of soul, R&B and pop songs. Sebastian said the writing of the album took two years. In an interview with BMag he said, "I didn't go into a cabin in the woods for six weeks and write my album, so there's not that similar, one vibe on the album – it's quite diverse." He believes it is his most soulful album, and that he was getting back to his roots of what he likes to listen to and write. Sebastian says the songs touch on the little moments in life, including ordinary moments. "There are a couple about how mundane life can be. You get so caught up in the machine of work, trying to keep up with life, your mortgage and kids, that you get lost in it a little bit."

While three of the singles released from the album have been upbeat pop songs many of the songs have darker themes about relationship problems. In an interview with BuzzFeed Sebastian explained that they are not about himself and his wife, saying, "There's a lot of songs about relationships coming to an end, and even being in denial of that. Not because of anything to do with my own personal relationships! But I've had people who are very close to me go through break-ups, and I've sort of watched it the whole way through, and it's been very close to my heart as of late. It's really occupied my headspace, and my writing space". Sebastian says his family did influence the album however. Missing out of family life because of the demands of work and constant travelling overseas began to frustrate him. Two songs on the album, "Alive" and "Light and Shade", are about making the most of your life and living in the moment, and are reminders to himself that there needs to be a happy medium between career and family life. In an interview with the Sydney Morning Herald Sebastian said juggling his career and family life gave him the inspiration for the title of the album, "I found myself writing in planes and in dressing rooms and while I was rocking my kids to sleep. It was definitely a mad sort of time".

== Release and promotion ==
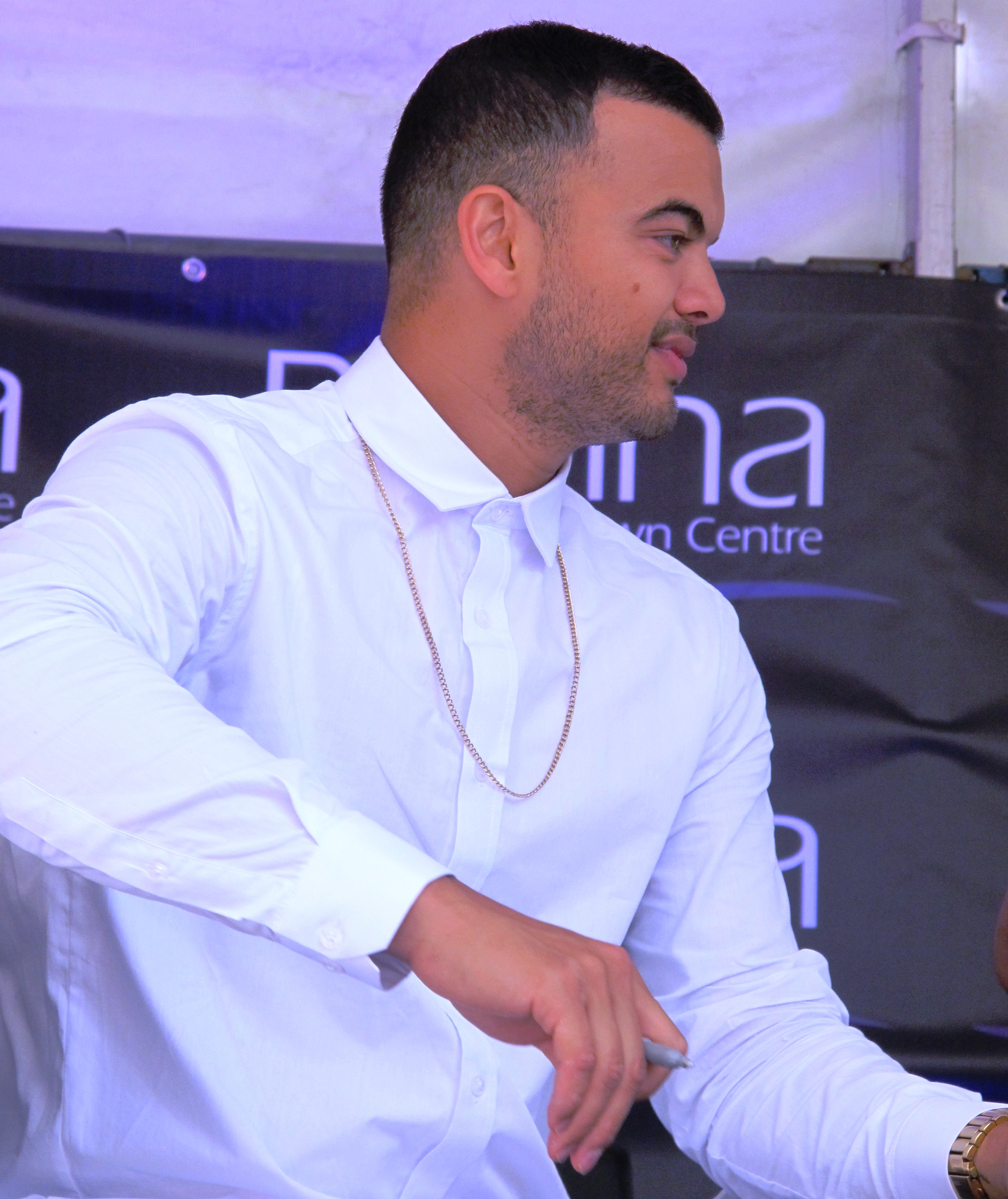
Gold Coast signing December 2014

The track listing, album cover art and release date were announced on 23 October 2014. "Madness" was released on 21 November 2014, a year after the first single "Like a Drum". Sebastian performed "Like a Drum" on the 2013 The X-Factor Grand Final. He performed "Come Home with Me" and "Mama Ain't Proud" during the 2014 series of The X-Factor. He also performed "Mama Ain't Proud" on the Grand Final of Dancing with the Stars and Seven Network's morning program Sunrise. In the weeks leading up to the release of the album Sebastian did a number of interviews with the printed media, and on radio and television programs. During the release week Sebastian launched the album with a concert at the opening of The X Studio. Lupe Fiasco who features on the song "Linger" travelled to Australia to perform at the concert which was broadcast live on the internet. Sebastian also did a series of national album signing events which were well attended.

== Singles ==
"Like a Drum" was released as the lead single from Madness on 25 October 2013. Debuting at number four, it became Sebastian's 12th top ten single in Australia, and his tenth to reach the top five. The song spent ten weeks in the top ten and was certified 5× platinum. It peaked at number 13 in New Zealand and was certified platinum there. The song also reached number 20 on the Billboard Dance Club Chart and 49 on the Swedish charts. It reached platinum certification in Sweden.

"Come Home with Me" was released as the second single on 8 August 2014. It peaked at number 13 and was certified platinum.

"Mama Ain't Proud" (featuring 2 Chainz) was released as the third single on 17 October 2014 and peaked at number 17 and achieved gold certification.

"Linger" (featuring Lupe Fiasco) was released as the fourth single in early December, 2014. It also reached number 17 and platinum certification.

== Tours ==
=== Madness Tour ===
In February 2015 Sebastian embarked on a six date arena tour in the mainland capital cities of Australia. He said that as the album was dynamic with big horns and drums an arena tour would enable him to replicate the album on a huge stage. The tour included two warm up shows in Dubbo. Fatai, a semi-finalist on the first The Voice series, was the support act. She returned to the stage to sing "Lightning" with Sebastian, a song she is the featured singer for on the Madness album. Sebastian performed with an eight-piece band, and he played guitar and piano on some of the songs. Carmen Smith, Gary Pinto and Vince Harder were the backing vocalists, and also performed as backup dancers. The staging included large screens and LED lighting.

== Critical reception ==
"Madness" has received a number of positive reviews. Jamie Horne, music journalist for the Border Mail, gave the album four out of five stars, saying "Sebastian is at the peak of his powers and it shines through on Madness". He said "Alive" was uplifting, and that "Linger" was a standout. Cameron Adams from the Herald Sun gave the album three and a half out of five stars, saying there were two sides to Sebastian, as apart from producing radio-friendly songs he "also has pop songs with depth and edge that are less instant, but more rewarding". He wrote that "the track "Madness" is epic but still subtle", "Linger" was "melow gold" and "The Pause" was a "stunning ballad" which "again reminds you the dude can really sing". Brad Szmerling of Music site auspOp noted that although Sebastian had released some polarising singles from the album, "Madness" was far better than those singles would indicate. He said "Elephant" and "Light & Shade" "both show off Guy's easy affinity with soul and R&B" and that "Linger" was catchy, reminding them of "some of Justin Timberlake's better moments". He said that overall Madness was "quite a varied and strong affair".

Marcus Floyd from Renowned for Sound gave the album four and a half out of five stars, saying "Guy Sebastian's Madness is everything but, the singer/songwriter knows what works for him musically and he's running with it without sounding dated". He said the album "demonstrates diversity in dynamic and content" and that "Sebastian is fully capable of vocally delivering the suitable emotion intended for the lyrics". Of "Light And Shade" Floyd wrote, "The soul in Guy's voice introduces "Light and Shade" with some wicked notes masterfully delivered, rapper Sage the Gemini's contribution keeps the vibe flowing, yet another singer/rapper collaboration that works well for Sebastian". He said "Linger", the collaboration with Lupe Fiasco is "a smooth dose of RnB and soul that leaves you nodding with admiration". Jessica Morris from FDRMX also gave the album four and a half out of five stars, saying Sebastian had "evolved tremendously since his 2003 debut as a fresh-faced boy with an afro, and nothing seems to show this more clearly than his latest album, Madness". She wrote that she had feared that as the singles had been moulded towards radio airplay the album "would lack the sense of joy and poignant emotion he so often embodies". She said she discovered she was wrong because "if Madness shows us anything, it's who Guy Sebastian is as a person and a musician. And while this release will appeal to the commercial market with its catchy rifts, on-point vocals and dubstep, it also features some riveting melodies and stirring lyrics". Morris also wrote that "Madness stands alone as a solid, fun, and moving album. Showing diversity in vocal delivery, song writing, style and theme, this album seems to reflect intentionality to every aspect of its creation and production."

=== Accolades ===
Sebastian received two ARIA Music Award nominations in 2014. "Like a Drum" was nominated for the Song of the Year Award, where the nominees are the highest selling singles of the year, and the public decided the winner. He was also nominated for Best Male Artist for "Come Home With Me". This category is voted for by people in the music industry. The album was nominated for Album of the Year and Sebastian for Male Artist of the Year in the Poprepublic.tv Awards. The nominees are chosen by Poprepublic and the winner decided by public vote. "Like a Drum" received 2015 APRA nominations for Pop Work of the Year and Most Played Australian Work.

== Commercial performance ==
Madness debuted on the ARIA Albums Chart at number six, becoming Sebastian's eighth consecutive top ten album in Australia. The album was certified gold in its second week of release.

== Track listing ==
Standard version
No.	Title	Writer(s)	Producer(s)	Length
1.	"Madness"	Guy Sebastian, Mason Levy, Tom Meredith, H. "Carmen Reece" Culver	MdL, Meredith	4:36
2.	"Mama Ain't Proud" (featuring 2 Chainz)	Sebastian, Nicholas Audino, Lewis Hughes, Fridolin "Freedo" Walcher, Tauheed Epps, Christoph "Shuko" Bauss	Twice as Nice, Shuko & Freedo	3:46
3.	"Like a Drum"	Sebastian, Khris Lorenz, Sam Martin, David Ryan Harris	Lorenz	3:01
4.	"Elephant"	Sebastian	Sebastian, ProJay	3:59
5.	"Alive"	Sebastian	MdL, Meredith	3:43
6.	"Light and Shade" (featuring Sage the Gemini)	Sebastian, Dominic Wynn Woods	M-Phazes	3:23
7.	"Linger" (featuring Lupe Fiasco)	Sebastian, Matt Radosevich, Wasalu Jaco	Matt Rad	4:13
8.	"One of Us"	Sebastian	ProJay	4:44
9.	"Imagine the Sunrise"	Sebastian, Boots Ottestad	Ottestad	3:17
10.	"Lightning" (featuring Fatai)	Sebastian, Britt Burton	MdL, Meredith	3:09
11.	"Come Home with Me"	Sebastian, Burton, Mario Marchetti	Sebastian, Marchetti	3:24
12.	"Animal in Me"	Sebastian, Audino, Hughes, Walcher, Bauss, Culver	Twice as Nice, Shuko & Freedo	2:52
13.	"The Pause"	Sebastian, Alex Hope	ProJay	3:57
Total length:				48:05

European version (bonus track)
No.	Title	Writer(s)	Producer(s)	Length
14.	"Tonight Again"	Sebastian, David Ryan Harris, Louis Schoorl	Schoorl	3:23

== Personnel ==
The following people contributed to Madness:

- Nicholas Audino – composer, producer, engineering
- Christoph "Shuko" Bauss – composer, producer
- Nelson Beato – backing vocals
- Emily Benford – backing vocals
- Adrian Breakspear – engineering
- Brit Burton – composer
- Simon Cohen – engineering
- H. "Carmen Reece" Culver – composer, backing vocals
- Oscar Dawson – guitar
- Luke Edgemon – backing vocals
- Tauheed Epps – composer, vocals
- Mike Farrell – piano
- Fatai – vocals
- Melenie Fontana – backing vocals
- George Georgiadis – engineering
- Ben Gurton – horns
- Angus Gomm – horns
- David Ryan Harris – composer
- Mark Himmel – producer
- Alex Hope – composer
- Lewis Hughes – composer, producer, engineering
- Wasalu Jaco – composer, vocals
- Matt Keegan – horns
- Keri Larson – backing vocals
- Mason Levy – composer
- Kris Lorenz – bass, composer, drums, engineering, guitars, producer, programming, vocal engineering, ukulele
- Brendon Lynch-Salaman – engineering
- Bill Malina – engineering
- Mario Marchetti – bass, backing vocals, composer, guitar, producer
- Sam Martin – composer
- MdL – producer
- Tom Meredith – composer, producer
- Angus Mouridsen – guitar
- M-Phazes – producer
- Boots Ottestad – backing vocals, bass, drums, guitars, keyboards, percussion, producer
- ProJay – guitar, keyboard and drum programming, producer
- Matt Radosevich – composer
- Matt Reid – drums, engineering, keyboards, mixing, percussion, producer
- Guy Sebastian – composer, drums, guitar, live percussion, piano, producer, vocals, vocal engineering
- Damien Smith – keyboards
- Fridolin "Freedo" Walcher – composer, producer
- Dominic Wynn Woods – composer, vocals

== Charts and certifications ==
=== Weekly charts ===
Chart (2014–2015)	Peak position
Australian Albums (ARIA)	6
Swedish Albums (Sverigetopplistan)	34

=== Year-end charts ===
Chart (2014)	Position
Australian Albums Chart	78
Australian Artist Albums Chart	22
Chart (2015)	Position
Australian Artist Albums Chart	38

=== Certifications ===
Region	Certification	Certified units/sales
Australia (ARIA)	Gold	35,000^{^}
^{^} Shipments figures based on certification alone.
