= Angels Brought Me Here =

2003 single by Guy Sebastian

Single by Guy Sebastian

from the album Just as I Am
- B-side: "When I Get You Alone"
- Released: 24 November 2003
- Recorded: November 2003
- Studio: Eargasm (Sydney)
- Genre: R&B, pop
- Length: 3:59
- Label: BMG
- Songwriters: Jörgen Elofsson, John Reid
- Producers: Bryon Jones, Adam Reily

Guy Sebastian singles chronology
"Angels Brought Me Here" (2003)	"All I Need Is You" (2004)

"Angels Brought Me Here" (or "Faith Has Brought Me Here") is a pop song by Australian singer-songwriter Guy Sebastian. It was released in Australia on 24 November 2003 as the lead single from his debut album, Just as I Am (2003). The song was written by Jörgen Elofsson and John Reid for Network Ten's TV talent competition, Australian Idol's inaugural season. Recorded versions were made for both grand finalists, Sebastian and Shannon Noll, with only Sebastian's version officially released by BMG. On 22 November the promotional video had premiered on the same network's Video Hits – produced by Australian Idol's Stephen Tate and directed by its musical director, John Foreman.

"Angels Brought Me Here" peaked at number one on the Australian ARIA Singles Chart. The single's first-week sales were at the time the highest weekly sale on record for both an Australian artist and a debut artist. The song was certified quintuple platinum by the Australian Recording Industry Association (ARIA) and sold in excess of 350,000 units. In January 2010 "Angels Brought Me Here" was announced as the highest-selling single of the 2000s decade in Australia. Until 2011 the song held the record as the highest-selling Australian-artist single in Australian chart history. "Angels Brought Me Here" was also popular in New Zealand, topping the RIANZ Singles Chart and achieving platinum status. In October 2004, Lisa B. Bermingham published Sebastian's official biography, Angels Brought Me Here.

== Background ==
"Angels Brought Me Here" was performed on 9 November 2003 by the final two contestants, Guy Sebastian and Shannon Noll, during the penultimate episode of Network Ten's TV talent competition, Australian Idol (2003). Both contestants were recorded and had their versions pressed by BMG, ready for the winner's version to be released immediately after the competition. Sebastian's winning performance was watched by an Australian record audience – for a non-sporting event – of 3.65 million. On 19 November he did an encore performance of the song and the single was issued in Australia on 24 November by BMG.

Sebastian referred to "Angels Brought Me Here", his winning moment on Australian Idol and his progress through the competition:

I reckon it really sums up just what I felt as far as the competition goes. It's a very overwhelming process to go through and you really do feel that there's something else that got you there. Especially with how I didn't feel confident before and then something just clicked and I could look people in the eyes and really try and deliver a song.

Sebastian believes it is "a great, inspirational song" that summarises how any Australian Idol winner would have felt. Noll, however, felt that the song was too difficult for him to sing. Sebastian's version was produced by Bryon Jones (member of Rockmelons) and Adam Reilly (who was also the programmer). The B-side, "When I Get You Alone" – a cover version of Robin Thicke's 2002 single – was recorded live on Australian Idol episode "Up Close & Personal" in October 2003. Sebastian's second single, "All I Need Is You", followed in February 2004 and also debuted at number-one. In September, his third number-one single in a row, "Out with My Baby", was issued from his second album, Beautiful Life (2004). He has since achieved three further number-one singles in Australia, "Like It Like That" in 2009, "Who's That Girl" in 2010, and "Battle Scars" in 2012.

Lisa B. Bermingham's official biography of Sebastian is titled, Angels Brought Me Here (October 2004) (aka Guy Sebastian: Angels Brought Me Here: The Official Biography). In November 2010, two versions of "Angels Brought Me Here" appeared on Sebastian's 2×CD compilation album, Twenty Ten: both the original and a newly recorded acoustic version. For the acoustic version, Sebastian also plays piano and is the co-producer with Carl Dimataga.

== Musical structure ==
"Angels Brought Me Here" is an R&B, pop ballad which was composed and written before the Australian Idol finalists were decided. The song's writers are Jörgen Elofsson and John Reid – it is also called "Faith Has Brought Me Here". Both Sebastian's and Noll's recorded versions were performed with the same musical structure. The song is composed in common time. The song's tempo is adagio, performed at 64 beats per minute. Its structure is in verse-chorus form, with a bridge following after two verses. The verses are in the key of C major, while the chorus changes key to D major, with higher dynamics. The last chorus following the bridge changes key again to E♭ major. At the end of the chorus, the lead singer sings the highest note of the song, holding for four bars, while the backing vocals repeat the chorus. The last line of the chorus is performed slightly off-beat, with the last notes held longer before the song ends. The vocals of the song range from C_{3} to B♭_{5}.

== Chart performance ==
"Angels Brought Me Here" debuted on the Australian ARIA Singles Chart on 1 December 2003 at number-one, the first of 12 top ten and six number-one singles that Sebastian has achieved during his career. Sebastian is the only Australian male artist in Australian chart history to achieve six number-one singles, and is third overall for all Australian acts. Only Delta Goodrem and Kylie Minogue have achieved more. "Angels Brought Me Here" sold 128,679 copies in its first week, setting an Australian record at the time for the highest first week single sales by both a debut artist and an Australian artist. It also had the second highest first week single sales from any artist, behind Elton John's tribute to Princess Diana, "Candle in the Wind". This record was eclipsed in late 2004 by Anthony Callea's debut single "The Prayer". Sebastian still has the second highest one week sales for an Australian artist single. "Angels Brought Me Here" remained at the top spot for three consecutive weeks, dropping to number three in its fourth week. The single spent a total of five weeks in the top ten and twelve weeks in the top fifty. Despite being released near the end of 2003, its strong sales placed "Angels Brought Me Here" at number-one on the End of Year Top 100 ARIA Singles Chart of 2003.

At the ARIA Music Awards of 2004, Sebastian earned the award for 'Highest Selling Single', and was also nominated for 'Highest Selling Album' for Just as I Am. In January 2010 ARIA announced that "Angels Brought Me Here" was the highest selling single of the previous decade, with Anthony Callea's "The Prayer" ranked second. It was certified quintuple platinum and sold in excess of 350,000 copies. At the time this was the highest sales ever recorded for an Australian artist single, a record Sebastian held until 2011. In 2011 the sales of "Angels Brought Me Here" were surpassed by Gotye's "Somebody That I Used to Know" which has now been certified 11× platinum. Since then several other Australian artist songs have also reached higher sales than "Angels Brought Me Here", including Sebastian's own song "Battle Scars" which has been certified 9× platinum.

Sebastian reflected on his song's popularity, "I guess its success is due to it being a well-written pop ballad, coupled with the fact that it's perfectly suited to my voice, and also my back-story... It doesn't take a genius to realise that the show was mostly responsible for the songs enormity but still, I'm glad I was the guy standing there at the end singing it". In a review for Sebastian's fifth number one single "Who's That Girl" in 2010 The Vine's Tim Byron said "Angels Brought Me Here" was "heavily associated with the climax of the show, and thus [has] pre-packaged meanings and associations that other songs will not ... something of the joy of music, of its eternal mystery, gets leached out in the process". Byron felt there was considerable "controversy over whether to give ARIA awards to people like Guy Sebastian" due to concerns about the artist's credibility. Byron added "But it's hard to argue that Guy Sebastian's continued success, seven years later, has much to do with Australian Idol.....even his 'brand recognition' will have faded by now.....If he is still successful, it's more and more because of his musical talent."

"Angels Brought Me Here" was also released in New Zealand, and debuted at number-one on 1 December 2003 on the RIANZ Singles Chart, retaining the position for three weeks. It spent eleven non-consecutive weeks in the top ten and twenty-two weeks in the top forty, and it achieved platinum accreditation.

== Music video ==
A music video was issued in November 2003 to promote the single. The video shows Sebastian on a TV set as it is being prepared for a show. He is dressed casually in jeans and windcheater. He sits on boxes as he begins to sing with a camera crew starting to film him. An image of a young woman is shown as he continues. Various personnel walk around him and adjust the set. Sebastian stands and the image of the female is seen again, she wears white feathers. Later, Sebastian is dressed more formally in a white suit as he performs the song. On this set are plasma screens depicting the same young woman. The video ends with Sebastian in his casual gear again, sitting on the boxes. The video was produced by Australian Idol's Stephen Tate and directed by the show's musical director, John Foreman. On 22 November, the clip was premiered on Network Ten's Video Hits – which had Tate as executive producer.

== Notable performances and cover versions ==
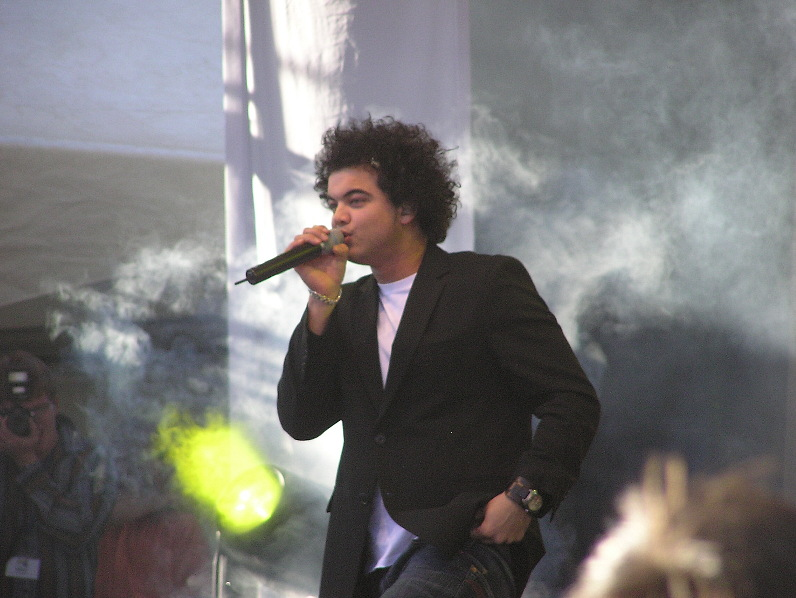
Sebastian performing at the Australian Gospel Music Festival, April 2004.

In January–February 2004 Sebastian and other Australian Idol finalists toured around Australia on the Australian Idol Concert Tour, which was promoted by Michael Chugg and Amanda Pelman. Sebastian also performed his own gigs including the Australian Gospel Music Festival in April. Sebastian appeared at the Asian MTV Awards, was a guest judge on New Zealand Idol and performed on Indonesian Idol. After a promotional trip to Malaysia in April he travelled to Europe and the US. In May Sebastian made a special guest appearance on American Idol, performing "Angels Brought Me Here" in the Top 3 verdict show. Sebastian was also a guest performer in the verdict show on Asian Idol in 2007, performing the song as duet with 2005 Indonesian Idol winner, Mike Mohede. In 2005, it was also performed by the fourth American Idol winner, Carrie Underwood, in the last performance show for the season. In April 2008, on the UK television drama series, Rock Rivals, which depicts a fictional talent show set in London, the song was performed by Bethany Hopkins (portrayed by Holly Quin-Ankrah) as her winning song. Cover versions of the song have been performed by Australian singer Hayley Legg and by French electro artist Sebastian Akchoté.

In 2009, Filipino female trio, La Diva, released "Angels Brought Me Here" as a single and included two versions of the song on their debut album, La Diva (2009). It served as the theme song for South Korean historical drama series, Queen Seondeok, that aired on GMA Network from 4 January to 12 August 2010.

== Track listing ==
1. "Angels Brought Me Here" – 3:59
2. "When I Get You Alone" (live from Australian Idol: Up Close & Personal) – 2:21

== Personnel ==
Musicians

- Guy Sebastian – lead vocals, background vocals
- Peter Northgate – guitars
- Bruce Heald – string arrangements

Production details

- Producer – Bryon Jones, Adam Reily
- Programmer – Adam Reily
- Engineer – Craig Portells at Eargasm Studios, Sydney
- Mixer – Steve MacMillan
- Mastering – Oscar Gaona at Studios 301, Sydney

== Charts ==
=== Weekly charts ===
Weekly chart performance for "Angels Brought Me Here"
Chart (2003–2004)	Peak position
Australia (ARIA)	1
Australian Urban (ARIA)	1
New Zealand (Recorded Music NZ)	1

=== Year-end charts ===
Year-end chart performance for "Angels Brought Me Here"
Chart (2003)	Position
Australia (ARIA)	1
Australian Urban (ARIA)	1
Chart (2004)	Position
New Zealand (RIANZ)	21

=== Decade-end charts ===
Decade-end chart performance for "Angels Brought Me Here"
Chart (2000–2009)	Position
Australia (ARIA)	1

== Certifications ==
Certifications and sales for "Angels Brought Me Here"
Region	Certification	Certified units/sales
Australia (ARIA)	5× Platinum	350,000^{‡}
New Zealand (RMNZ)	Platinum	10,000^{*}
^{*} Sales figures based on certification alone.^{‡} Sales+streaming figures based on certification alone.
