= All I Need Is You =

2004 single by Guy Sebastian

Single by Guy Sebastian

from the album Just as I Am
- B-side: "Climb Ev'ry Mountain"
- Released: 23 February 2004
- Recorded: 2003
- Length: 4:05
- Label: BMG Australia
- Songwriters: Guy Sebastian; Adam Reily; Alun Firth
- Producers: Bryon Jones; Adam Reily

Guy Sebastian singles chronology
"Angels Brought Me Here" (2003)	"All I Need Is You" (2004)	"Out with My Baby" (2004)

"All I Need Is You" is a single by Australian singer Guy Sebastian. The song was the second single released from Sebastian's debut album, Just as I Am (2003), following "Angels Brought Me Here". "All I Need Is You" reached number one on the Australian ARIA Singles Chart and was accredited platinum in Australia. The song also peaked at number five in New Zealand.

As a B-side for this single, Sebastian recorded his own modern arrangement of "Climb Ev'ry Mountain" from The Sound of Music, a song which he had performed on Australian Idol when he was competing in the series.

== Music video ==
A music video was produced to promote the single. In the video, Sebastian is shown riding a bike through a rural landscape while couples show affection around him. Towards the end of the video, Sebastian is also shown in a crowded room with people dancing. During interviews conducted in early 2004, Sebastian stated that the video would show his first onscreen kiss; however, this was later found to be a joke.

== Track listing ==
Australian CD single

1. "All I Need Is You" (single remix) – 4:07
2. "All I Need Is You" (Cutfather & Joe remix) – 3:54
3. "All I Need Is You" (Sterling remix) – 3:35
4. "Climb Ev'ry Mountain" (Rodgers and Hammerstein) – 2:55

== Charts ==
=== Weekly charts ===
Chart (2004)	Peak position
Australia (ARIA)	1
New Zealand (Recorded Music NZ)	5

=== Year-end charts ===
Chart (2004)	Position
Australia (ARIA)	47

== Certifications ==
Region	Certification	Certified units/sales
Australia (ARIA)	Platinum	70,000^{^}
^{^} Shipments figures based on certification alone.
