= Linger (Guy Sebastian song) =

Single by Guy Sebastian featuring Lupe Fiasco

from the album Madness
- Released: 1 December 2014
- Genre: Pop
- Length: 4:13
- Label: Sony
- Songwriters: Guy Sebastian; Matt Radosevich; Wasalu Jaco

Guy Sebastian singles chronology
| "Mama Ain't Proud" (2014) | "Linger" (2014) | "Spirit of the Anzacs" (2015) |

Lupe Fiasco singles chronology
| "Deliver" (2014) | "Linger" (2014) | "Countdown" (2015) |

"Linger" is a song by Australian recording artist Guy Sebastian featuring American rapper Lupe Fiasco. It was released as the fourth single from Sebastian's seventh studio album, Madness (2014). "Linger" peaked at number 17 on the ARIA Singles Chart and was certified platinum by the Australian Recording Industry Association for shipments exceeding 70,000 shipments.

== Release and promotion ==
Sebastian performed "Linger" on Today in December 2014. An acoustic version of the song was also released on Vevo on December 8, 2014.

== Music video ==
On December 1, 2014, Guy Sebastian announced via Instagram that he would be releasing a video to "Linger" soon. The video premiered on January 12, 2015.

== Track listing ==
- Digital download
1. "Linger" – 4:13

== Charts ==
=== Weekly charts ===
| Chart (2015) | Peak position |
|---|---|
| Australia (ARIA) | 17 |

=== Year-end chart ===
| Chart (2015) | Position |
|---|---|
| Australian Artist Singles Chart | 18 |

== Certifications ==
| Region | Certification | Certified units/sales |
|---|---|---|
| Australia (ARIA) | Platinum | 70,000^{‡} |
^{‡} Sales+streaming figures based on certification alone.
