= Black & Blue (Guy Sebastian song) =

Single by Guy Sebastian
- Released: 13 November 2015
- Genre: Pop
- Length: 3:39
- Label: Sony
- Songwriter(s): Guy Sebastian; Jaymes Young

Guy Sebastian singles chronology
"Tonight Again" (2015)	"Black & Blue" (2015)	"Desert" (2016)

"Black & Blue" is a song by Australian recording artist Guy Sebastian, released as a stand-alone single in November 2015. "Black & Blue" peaked at number 17 on the ARIA Singles Chart. The song became his 25th Top 100 entry and his twentieth Top 20 hit in Australia.

Sebastian explains "Black & Blue" is a hindsight song about not appreciating something you had that was great, it is now gone and you know it’s only yourself that is to blame."

Two remixes were released on iTunes on 22 January 2016.

== Release and promotion ==
Sebastian performed "Black & Blue" on The X Factor on 17 November 2015.

== Music video ==
The video premiered on 30 November 2015. It was directed by Matt Sharp. the music video was nominated for Best Video at the ARIA Music Awards of 2016.

== Track listing ==
- Digital download
1. "Black & Blue" – 3:39
- Remixes Single
1. "Black & Blue" (Paces Remix) – 3:30
- Remixes Single
1. "Black & Blue" (YMNO Remix) – 3:32

== Charts ==
=== Weekly chart ===
Chart (2015)	Peak position
Australia (ARIA)	17

=== Year-end chart ===
Chart (2015)	Position
Australian Artist Singles Chart	33

== Certifications ==
Region	Certification	Certified units/sales
Australia (ARIA)	Platinum	70,000^{‡}
^{‡} Sales+streaming figures based on certification alone.
