= Like a Drum =

Single by Guy Sebastian

from the album Madness
- Released: 25 October 2013
- Recorded: Los Angeles, CA
- Length: 3:01
- Label: Sony
- Songwriters: Guy Sebastian; Khris Lorenz; Sam Martin; David Ryan Harris
- Producer: Khris Lorenz

Guy Sebastian singles chronology
"Dare to Be Square" (2013)	"Like a Drum" (2013)	"Come Home with Me" (2014)

Music video
- "Like a Drum" on YouTube

"Like a Drum" is a song by Australian recording artist Guy Sebastian released digitally in Australia on 25 October 2013. It debuted at number four on the ARIA Singles Chart, Sebastian's twelfth top ten single in Australia, and was certified 5× platinum in 2023. It also reached number 13 and platinum certification on the New Zealand Singles Chart and has been certified platinum in Sweden.

== Music video ==
The video begins as Guy Sebastian starts singing the song as a red hooded figure on a porch of a house. The scene switches to a boy (possibly him as a child) who has a girlfriend though they are possibly ten or twelve years old. As the song goes of scenes of Guy continuing on that porch the childhood girlfriend moves away and the young Guy hops on a bike and scooter and travels the world searching for her. They finally find each other and the swing and play together being happy and the video ends with the adult Guy pulling up his hood and walking off. It was filmed in Middletown, New York.

== Release and promotion ==
"Like a Drum" was serviced to Australian radio on 21 October 2013. The song became the most played song in Australia in late December where it remained for two weeks. Sebastian performed the song on the Grand Final of season five of The X Factor Australia. Sebastian also performed the song on the Grand Finale of season 13 of Dancing with the Stars Australia and Indonesia's Got Talent (Series 2).

== Commercial performance ==
"Like a Drum" debuted at number four on the ARIA Singles Chart, Sebastian's 12th of 14 top ten singles in Australia. The song spent 18 weeks in the chart, including ten non-consecutive weeks in the top ten, and was certified 5× platinum in 2023. "Like a Drum" reached number 13 and platinum certification in New Zealand, his eighth single to chart in the top 20 there. It also charted in the top 50 in Sweden and achieved platinum certification.

== Track listing ==
- Digital download
1. "Like a Drum" – 3:01
- The Chainsmokers Remix
1. "Like a Drum" (The Chainsmokers Remix) – 3:20

== Charts ==
=== Weekly charts ===
Chart (2013–14)	Peak position
Australia (ARIA)	4
Belgium (Ultratip Bubbling Under Flanders)	61
France (SNEP)	183
New Zealand (Recorded Music NZ)	13
Poland Airplay (ZPAV)	11
Sweden (Sverigetopplistan)	49
US Dance Club Songs (Billboard)	20

=== Year-end charts ===
Chart (2013)	Position
Australia (ARIA)	50
Australian Artist Singles (ARIA)	6
Chart (2014)	Position
Australian Artist Singles (ARIA)	24

== Certifications ==
Region	Certification	Certified units/sales
Australia (ARIA)	5× Platinum	350,000^{‡}
New Zealand (RMNZ)	Platinum	15,000^{*}
Sweden (GLF)	Platinum	40,000^{‡}
^{*} Sales figures based on certification alone.^{‡} Sales+streaming figures based on certification alone.

== Release history ==
Region	Date	Format	Label
Australia	25 October 2013	Digital download	Sony Music Australia
New Zealand	25 October 2013	Digital download	Sony Music Australia
Australia	6 December 2013	CD single	Sony Music Australia
United States	12 January 2014	Digital download	The Cherry Party; Sony Music Entertainment
United States	4 March 2014	Contemporary hit radio	The Cherry Party; Rush Associated Labels; RCA Records
