= Before I Go =

Single by Guy Sebastian

from the album T.R.U.T.H.
- Released: 2 November 2018
- Genre: Soul
- Length: 3:29
- Label: Sony Music Australia
- Songwriters: Guy Sebastian; Jamie Hartman
- Producer: Jamie Hartman

Guy Sebastian singles chronology
"Siren" (2018)	"Before I Go" (2018)	"Choir" (2019)

Music video
- "Before I Go" on YouTube

"Before I Go" is a song by Australian singer Guy Sebastian. It was written by Sebastian and Jamie Hartman and released on 2 November 2018 as the lead single from Sebastian's ninth studio album T.R.U.T.H.. The song was the most added song on Australian radio in the week of release. "Before I Go" peaked at number 43 on the Australian Singles Chart, and was certified 2× platinum. also charted at number 41 in the Netherlands, and achieved platinum certification there.

== Background ==
In a statement, Sebastian said: "This was the very first song I wrote when I sat down to start this new album and it says so much about what I was feeling at the time. In fact, the vocal is still the demo vocal from the writing session because it just felt honest."

== Reception ==
Jas H from Amnpify said: "'Before I Go' brings the singer songwriter's vocals and soaring delivery to an emotive and captivating place, setting the tone and anticipation around his forthcoming new music." He added: "The new song is about self belief and taking control of your own destiny and legacy regardless of the limitations people or obstacles in your path may place over you". Universal Publishing Group said, "The powerful anthem runs with soulful and passionate depths, reaching new heights with its catchiness and honesty."

== Charts ==
=== Weekly charts ===
Chart (2018–19)	Peak position
Australia (ARIA)	41
Belgium (Ultratip Bubbling Under Flanders)	24
Netherlands (Dutch Top 40)	9
Netherlands (Single Top 100)	41

=== Year-end charts ===
Chart (2019)	Position
Australian Artist (ARIA)	41
Netherlands (Dutch Top 40)	53

== Certifications ==
Region	Certification	Certified units/sales
Australia (ARIA)	2× Platinum	140,000^{‡}
Netherlands (NVPI)	Platinum	80,000^{‡}
^{‡} Sales+streaming figures based on certification alone.

== Release history ==
Country	Release date	Format	Label
Australia	2 November 2018	Digital download, streaming	Sony Music Australia
