= Mama Ain't Proud =

Single by Guy Sebastian featuring 2 Chainz

from the album Madness
- Released: 20 October 2014
- Genre: Pop
- Length: 3:46
- Label: Sony
- Songwriters: Nicholas Audino; Lewis Hughes; Fridolin Walcher; Christoph Bauss; Tauheed Epps
- Producers: Twice as Nice; Shuko & Freedo

Guy Sebastian singles chronology
"Come Home with Me" (2014)	"Mama Ain't Proud" (2014)	"Linger" (2014)

2 Chainz singles chronology
"U Guessed It (Remix)" (2014)	"Mama Ain't Proud" (2014)	"Hood Go Crazy" (2015)

"Mama Ain't Proud" is a song by Australian singer Guy Sebastian, released digitally in Australia on 20 October 2014. It debuted at number 17 on the ARIA Singles Chart. It is the third single from his album Madness and was produced by Twice as Nice, Shuko & Freedo. "Mama Ain't Proud" was certified gold by the Australian Recording Industry Association for shipments exceeding 35,000 copies.

== Release and promotion ==
Sebastian performed the song live on The X Factor Australia grand final show on October 20 and on Sunrise on October 27.

The video was shot in Atlanta on October 10. The Tagline "mama ain't proud" was penned by Guy Sebastian after a heated argument with his mother about his lack of Christianity.

== Charts ==
=== Weekly charts ===
Chart (2014–15)	Peak position
Australia (ARIA)	17
Germany (GfK)	92

=== Year-end chart ===
Chart (2014)	Position
Australian Artist Singles Chart	41

== Certifications ==
Region	Certification	Certified units/sales
Australia (ARIA)	Gold	35,000^{^}
^{^} Shipments figures based on certification alone.
