= Australian Idol discography =

- Australian Idol Music Releases
Genres	Pop, dance-pop, pop rock, synthpop, indie pop, pop punk, rock, soft rock, country rock, R&B, urban, soul, covers, jazz, folk, alternative, country
Years	2003 – present
Record labels	BMG, Sony Music Australia, Warner Music Group, Universal Music, EMI, RCA, Ministry of Sound, Shock Records, Rajon, Decca Records Australia, Scorpio Music
Charting regions	Australia, Austria, Belgium, France, Germany, Iceland, Ireland, Japan, Netherlands, New Zealand, Norway, Sweden, Switzerland, UK, US

Australian Idol was a televised talent contest, screened on Channel Ten for seven seasons between 2003 and 2009. Several contestants were signed to record labels, while others released their music independently. Since 2003 Australian Idol acts have placed well on the Australian music charts, with numerous platinum and gold certifications. Eight Idol releases appeared in the 2000 – 2009 ARIA End of Decade Charts, and 24 releases have been nominated for Highest Selling ARIA Music Awards. Idol contestants have also been nominated for 35 ARIA Awards in public vote categories, where the nominees are most commonly selected from the highest selling acts of the year. There have also been 50 industry judged ARIA Award nominations. To date there have been 11 wins in sales and public vote categories, and in 2013 season one winner Guy Sebastian and season four runner up Jessica Mauboy became the first Idol contestants to win peer voted ARIA Awards.

While many of the contestants only charted with their early releases, some, most notably Sebastian, Mauboy, season five runner up Matt Corby, season one runner up Shannon Noll, and season two runner up Anthony Callea have experienced long-term success. Nine Idol acts have charted outside Australia, including Noll and Leith who reached the top ten on the Irish charts with their debut singles, and Sebastian and season seven winner Stan Walker who have both achieved numerous top ten certified entries on the New Zealand charts. Sebastian is currently the only Australian Idol contestant to chart in the US. "Battle Scars", a collaboration with Lupe Fiasco, reached number 71 on the Billboard Hot 100 Chart, 23 on the Billboard Digital Song Chart and number one on the R&B/Hip-Hop Digital Song Chart. It spent 20 weeks in the Hot 100, and has been certified triple platinum for sales of three million. "Battle Scars" also reached number two in Norway. In January 2013 Ricki-Lee Coulter's "Do It Like That" reached number seven on the Japan Hot 100.

== Australian Idol contestants ==
- Australian Idol's highest selling acts
- Guy Sebastian (season one winner)
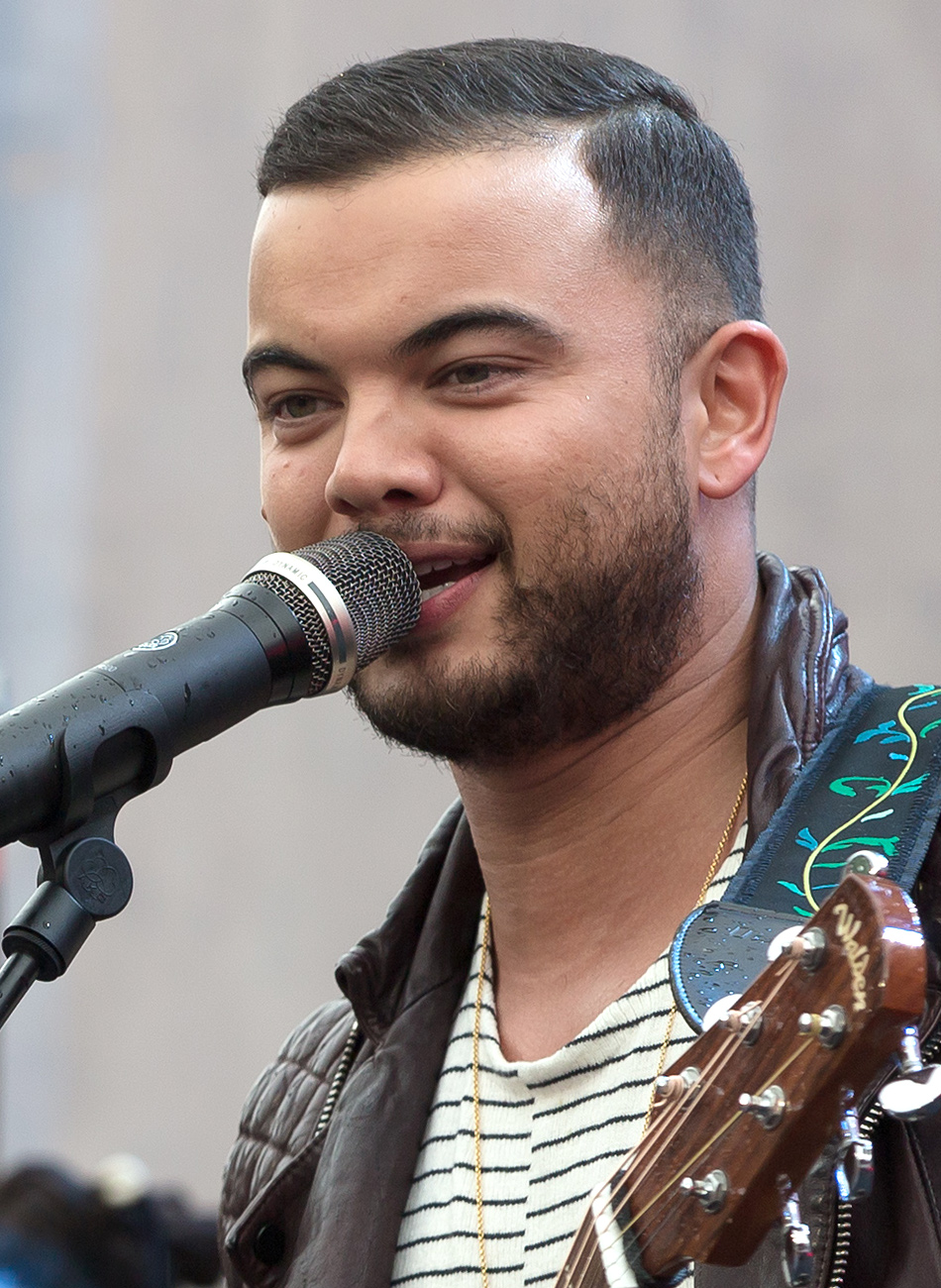
Certifications	82 Platinum 7 Gold
Albums	Eleven top ten albums, with nine reaching the top five, including three number ones. 17 Platinum 1 gold
EPs	One Top 40 EP
Singles	23 top 20 singles, including 14 top tens, with six achieving number one. Two other top 50 singles. 65 Platinum 6 Gold
ARIA Awards	Nominations 34 Wins 7
- Jessica Mauboy (season four runner up)
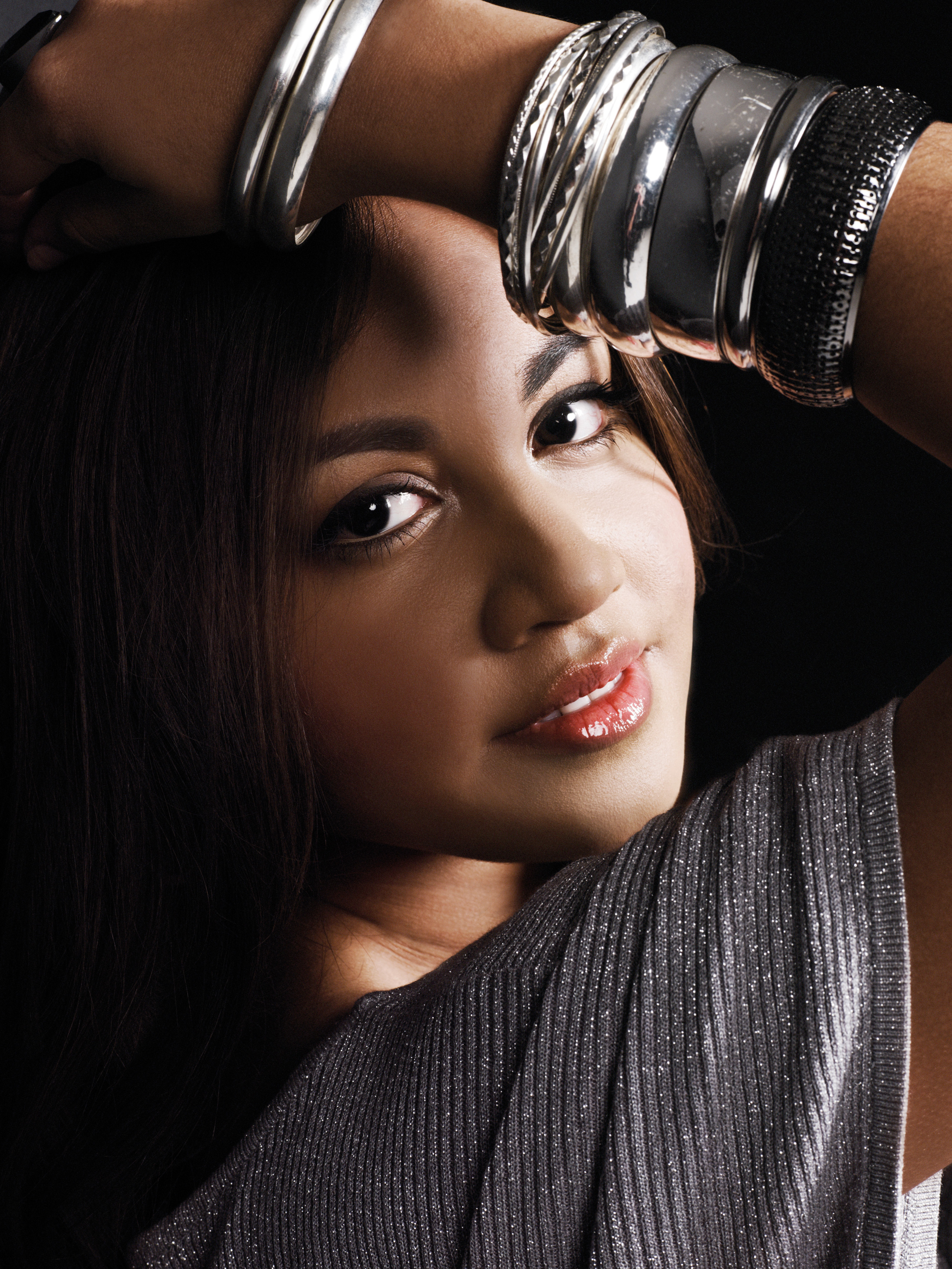
Certifications	21 Platinum 9 Gold
Albums	Seven top ten albums including two number ones, and a number 11 album. 5 Platinum 2 Gold
EPs	One Top 30 EP
Singles	16 top 20 singles, including nine top tens, one of which reached number one. Nine other top 50 singles. 16 Platinum 7 Gold
ARIA Awards	nominations 31 wins 2
- Matt Corby (season five runner up)
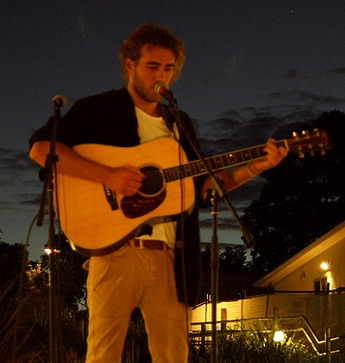
Certifications	21 Platinum 5 Gold
Albums	Four top ten albums, including a number one. 1 Gold
EPs	Two top 20 EPs, including one which reached number three. 10 Platinum
Singles	One number five single, one other top 50 single. 11 Platinum 4 gold
ARIA Awards	Nominations 11 Wins 2
- Shannon Noll (season one runner up)
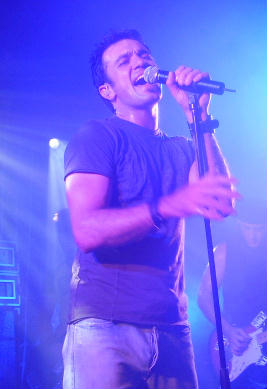
Certifications	17 Platinum 3 Gold
Albums	Seven top ten albums, including two number ones. 9 Platinum
Singles	Ten top ten singles including three number ones. Two other top 50 singles. 8 Platinum 3 Gold
ARIA Awards	Nominations 6 Wins —
- Anthony Callea (season two runner up)
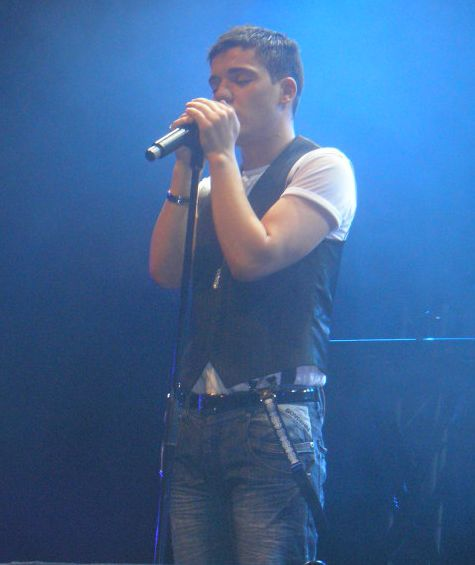
Certifications	8 Platinum 1 Gold
Albums	Five top 10 albums including three number ones, and two other top 50 albums. 2 Platinum 1 Gold
Singles	Six top 20 singles, including five top tens, with two achieving number one. 6 Platinum
ARIA Awards	Nominations 3 Wins 1
- Damien Leith (season four winner)
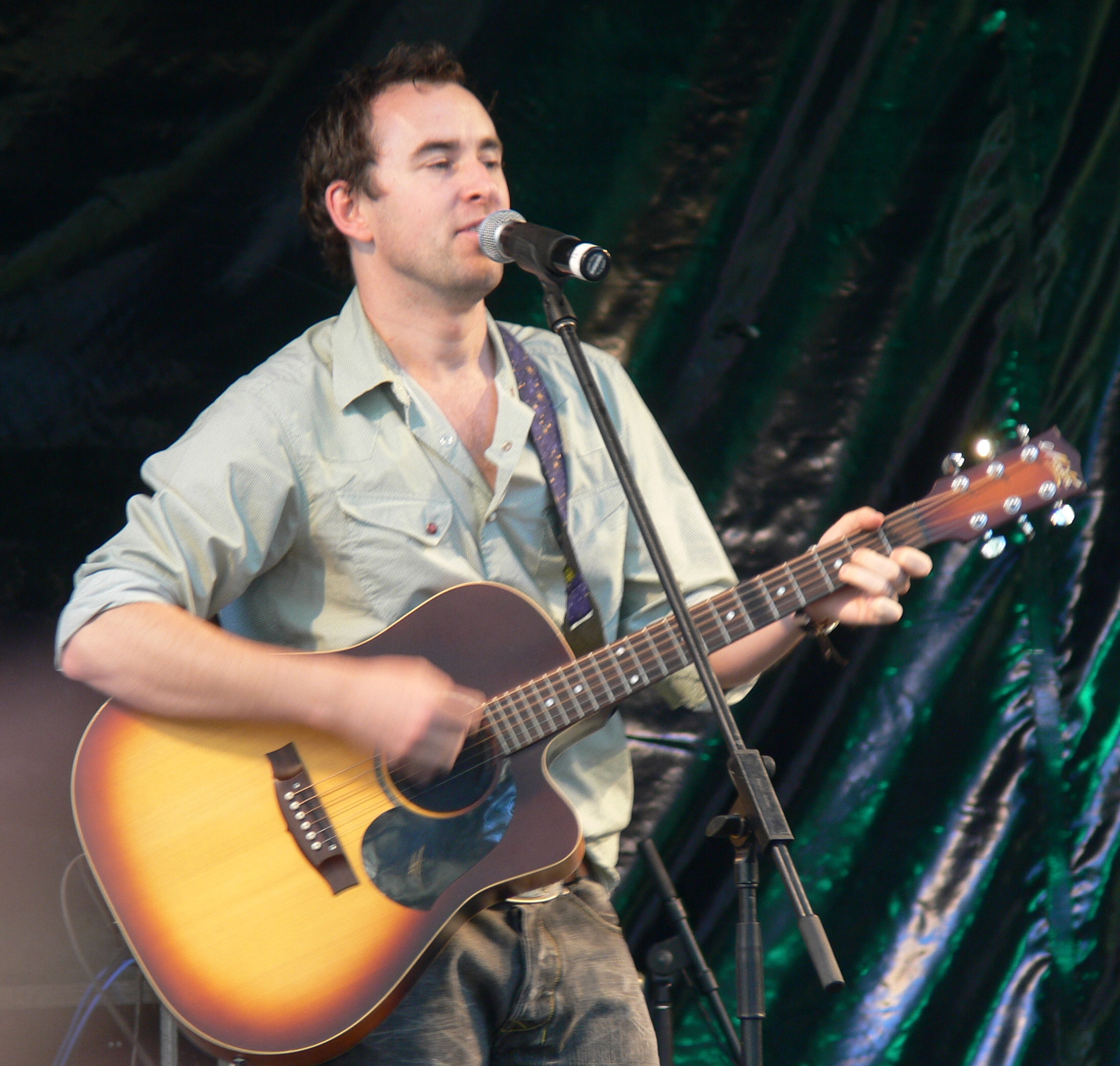
Certifications	7 Platinum 1 Gold
Albums	Four top two albums, including two number ones, and three other top 30 albums. 6 Platinum 1 Gold
Singles	Two top 20 singles, including one number one. 1 Platinum
ARIA Awards	Nominations 4 Wins 1
- Stan Walker (season seven winner)
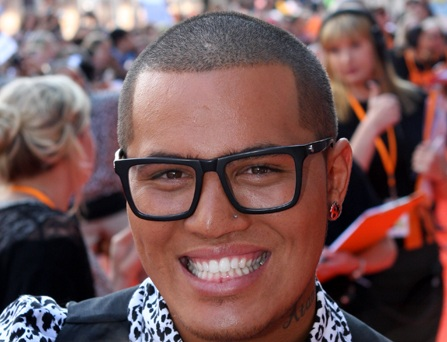
Certifications	5 Platinum 3 Gold
Albums	Four top 20 albums, including three top tens. 1 Platinum
Singles	Three top 20 singles including two top tens. Four other top 50 singles. 4 Platinum 3 Gold
ARIA Awards	Nominations 5 Wins —
- Casey Donovan (season two winner)
Certifications	5 Platinum
Albums	One number two album. 3 Platinum
Singles	One number one single. 2 Platinum
ARIA Awards	Nominations 2 Wins —
- Ricki-Lee Coulter (season two finalist)
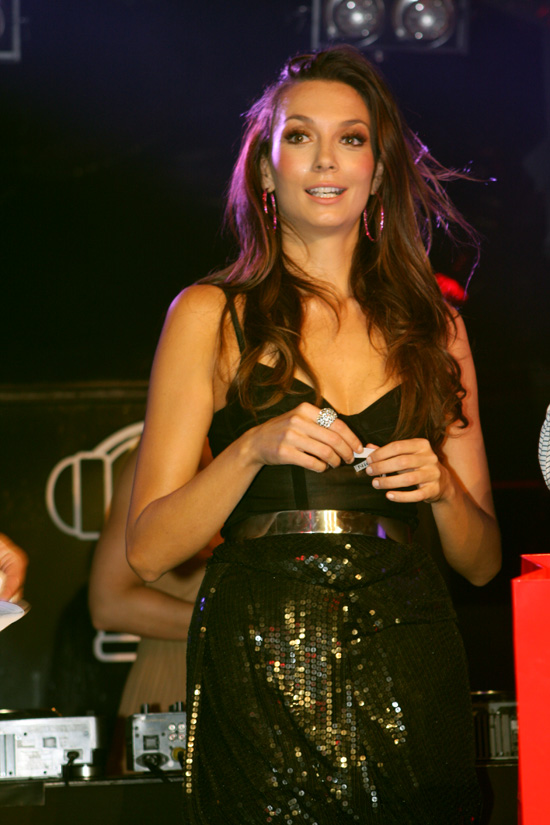
Certifications	3 Platinum 3 Gold
Albums	A top ten and two top 40 albums. 1 Gold
Singles	15 top 50 singles, including four top 20s and five top tens. 3 Platinum 2 Gold
ARIA Awards	Nominations 1 Wins —
- Young Divas*
Certifications	3 Platinum 2 Gold
Albums	Two top ten albums. 2 Platinum 1 Gold
Singles	Four top 40 singles, including one top 20 and two top tens. 1 Platinum 1 Gold
- *Performers: Paulini – season 1, Kate DeAraugo and Emily Williams – season 3 (both albums). Ricki-Lee Coulter – season 2 (1st album). Jessica Mauboy – season 4 (2nd album).
- 2003 Top 12* (season one)
Certifications	2 Platinum 1 Gold
Albums	One number three album. 2 Platinum
Singles	One number one single. 1 Gold
- * Performers – Guy Sebastian, Shannon Noll, Cosima De Vito, Paulini, Rob Mills, Levi Kereama^{†}, Rebekah LaVauney, Kelly Cavuoto, Lauren Buckley, Cle Wootton, Peter Ryan, Matthew Chadwick
- Other notable contestants
- Season one
- Paulini (finalist)
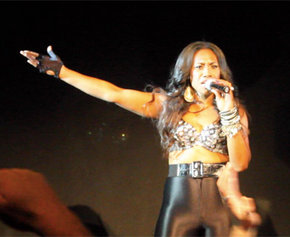
Albums	One platinum number one album, a top 25 album, and an EP and album which charted the top 100.
Singles	Four top 50 singles, including a platinum certified number one.
ARIA Awards	Nominations 1 Wins —
- Joel Turner (auditions)
Albums	A platinum top 30 album.
Singles	Six top 30 singles, including a platinum number one.
ARIA Awards	Nominations 3 Wins —
- Cosima De Vito (finalist)
Albums	A number two gold certified album
Singles	Two Top 50 singles, including a platinum number one.
- Season three
- Kate DeAraugo (winner)
Albums	A platinum top ten album.
Singles	Two top ten singles including a platinum number one.
ARIA Awards	Nominations 1 Wins —
- Lee Harding (finalist)
Albums	A gold certified number three album.
Singles	Two top 30 singles including at number-one platinum debut single.
ARIA Awards	Nominations 1 Wins —
- Season four
- Lisa Mitchell (finalist)
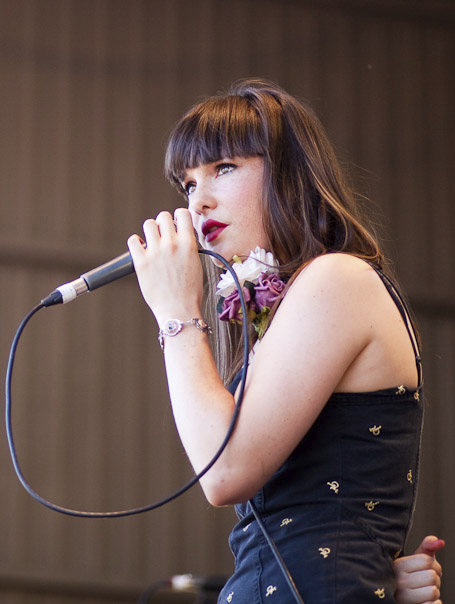
Albums	Three top ten albums, with one certified platinum.
Singles	Two top 30 singles, including one which reached gold certification.
ARIA Awards	Nominations 5 Wins —
- Season five
- Natalie Gauci (winner)
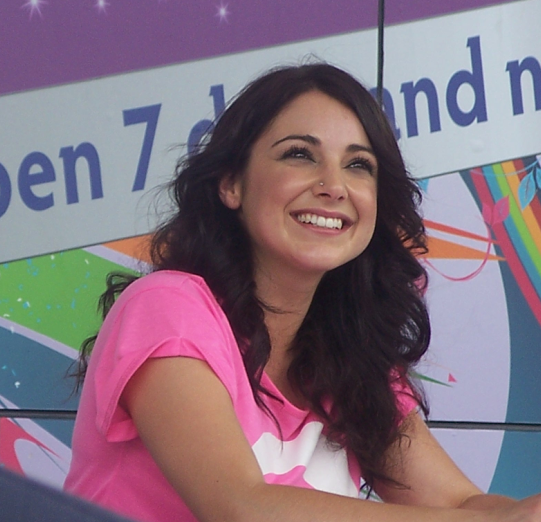
Albums	A platinum certified album which reached number 11.
Singles	A gold certified number two single.
- Season six
- Wes Carr (winner)
Albums	A gold certified number two album.
Singles	Three top 50 singles, including a gold certified number one and number 14.
ARIA Awards	Nominations 1 Wins —
- Other contestants who have charted
- ARIA Top 50
Season 1	Rob Mills; Levi Kereama^{†} Axle Whitehead; Courtney Act; Brielle Davis
Season 3	Laura Gissara; James Kannis
Season 4	Dean Geyer
Season 5	Carl Riseley
Season 7	Hayley Warner; Casey Barnes
- ARIA Top 100
Season 3	Dan England; Roxane LeBrasse
Season 4	Bobby Flynn

The most successful season of Australian Idol was the first one in 2003, with the contestants achieving 19 of the 35 Australian Idol number ones, and more than half the certifications. Season one winner Guy Sebastian has been the most commercially successful Australian Idol contestant, with season four runner up Jessica Mauboy second. They are followed by season five runner up Matt Corby, season one runner up Shannon Noll, season two runner up Anthony Callea, and season four winner Damien Leith. These contestants have all achieved multiple chart entries and certifications. Eleven other contestants have had two or more certified top 50 releases as solo artists. Following are lists of albums, singles and DVDs released by Australian Idol contestants, including ARIA Chart peaks and runs, certifications, and any Australian chart records these releases hold.

== 2003 Season One ==
Winner – Guy Sebastian
Runner up – Shannon Noll

Albums

Year	Artist	Title				
Year	Artist	Title	Chart peak	Weeks in Top 10	Weeks in Top 50	Certification award
2003	2003 Top 12	The Final 12 – Cast Album	3	6	11	2× platinum
2003	Guy Sebastian	Just as I Am	1	8	17	6× platinum
2004	Shannon Noll	That's What I'm Talking; About	1	14	39	5× platinum
2004	Rob Mills	Up All Night	21	—	2	—
2004	Paulini	One Determined; Heart	1	3	9	Platinum
2004	Cosima De Vito	Cosima	2	1	5	Gold
2004	Guy Sebastian	Beautiful Life	2	3	10	Platinum
2004	Joel Turner (and the Modern Day Poets)	Joel Turner and the Modern Day Poets	28	—	12	Platinum
2004	Levi Kereama^{†} (with Lethbridge)	Destiny	—	—	—	—
2004	Peter Ryan	Like Oxygen	—	—	—	—
2005	Shannon Noll	Lift	1	9	53	3× platinum
2006	Paulini	Superwoman	72	—	—	—
2006	Guy Sebastian	Closer to the Sun	4	2	9	Platinum
2007	Joel Turner	Out of the Box	—	—	—	—
2007	Shannon Noll	Turn It Up	3	3	15	Platinum
2007	Cosima De Vito	This Is Now	—	—	—	—
2007	Guy Sebastian	The Memphis Album	3	8	18	2× platinum
2008	Axle Whitehead	Losing Sleep	68	—	—	—
2008	Shannon Noll	No Turning Back: The; Story So Far	7	1	7	—
2009	Guy Sebastian	Like It Like That	6	2	19	Platinum
2010	Guy Sebastian	Twenty Ten	4	12	18	2× platinum
2011	Shannon Noll	A Million Suns	8	1	3	—
2012	Guy Sebastian	Armageddon	1	14	31	3× platinum
2014	Guy Sebastian	Madness	6	1	16	Gold
2015	Paulini	Come Alive	25	—	1	—
2015	Paulini	Merry Christmas	—	—	—	—
2017	Guy Sebastian	Conscious	4	1	8	—
2018	Shannon Noll	Unbroken	7	1	2	—
2020	Guy Sebastian	T.R.U.T.H.	1	11	21	Platinum
2021	Shannon Noll	Raw	3	1	1	—
2025	Guy Sebastian	100 Times Around the Sun	2	1	6	—
"—" denotes albums that did not chart or did not receive a certification.

EPs

Year	Artist	Title				
Year	Artist	Title	Chart peak	Weeks in Top 10	Weeks in Top 50	Certification award
2004	Paulini	Amazing Grace: Songs for Christmas	70	—	—	—
2005	Rebekah LaVauney	Chapter 1	—	—	—	—
2007	Guy Sebastian	Your Song	—	—	—	—
2016	Guy Sebastian	Part 1-EP	31	—	2	—
"—" denotes EPs that did not chart or did not receive a certification.

Singles

Year	Artist	Title				
Year	Artist	Title	Chart peak	Weeks in Top 10	Weeks in Top 50	Certification award
2003	2003 Top 12	"Rise Up"; The Final 12 – Cast Album	1	4	7	Gold
2003	Guy Sebastian	"Angels Brought Me Here"; Just as I Am	1	5	12	5× platinum
2004	Shannon Noll	"What About Me"; That's What I'm Talking About	1	8	14	4× platinum
2004	Guy Sebastian	"All I Need Is You"; Just as I Am	1	4	12	Platinum
2004	Shannon Noll	"Drive"; That's What I'm Talking About	4	6	11	Platinum
2004	Levi Kereama (with Lethbridge)	"In My Room"; Destiny	12	—	6	—
2004	Courtney Act	"Rub Me Wrong"; Non album single	29	—	2	—
2004	Rob Mills	"Ms Vanity"; Up All Night	6	1	6	Gold
2004	Paulini	"Angel Eyes"; One Determined Heart	1	9	16	Platinum
2004	Shannon Noll	"Learn to Fly"; That's What I'm Talking About	1	3	8	Gold
2004	Cosima De Vito	"When the War Is Over"/ "One Night Without You"; Cosima	1	7	13	Platinum
2004	Rob Mills	"Every Single Day"; Up All Night	24	—	6	—
2004	Paulini	"We Can Try"; One Determined Heart	30	—	6	—
2004	Guy Sebastian	"Out with My Baby"; Beautiful Life	1	4	14	Platinum
2004	Joel Turner and the Modern Day Poets	"These Kids"; Joel Turner and the Modern; Day Poets	1	15	21	Platinum
2004	Guy Sebastian	"Kryptonite"; Beautiful Life	15	—	8	—
2004	Cosima De Vito	"Now That You Can't; Have Me"; Cosima	42	—	1	—
2004	Shannon Noll	"C'mon Aussie C'mon"; Non album single	2	4	10	Platinum
2004	Levi Kereama (with Lethbridge)	"Handcuffs Off"; Destiny	33	—	2	—
2005	Joel Turner and the Modern Day Poets (feat. Anthony Mundine)	"Knock U Out"; Joel Turner and the Modern; Day Poets	14	—	9	—
2005	Guy Sebastian	"Oh Oh"; Beautiful Life	11	—	11	—
2005	Joel Turner and the Modern Day Poets	"Funk U Up"; Joel Turner and the Modern; Day Poets	13	—	5	—
2005	Shannon Noll	"Shine"; Lift	1	9	20	Platinum
2005	Joel Turner and the Modern Day Poets	"Respect"; Joel Turner and the Modern; Day Poets	30	—	4	—
2005	Shannon Noll	"Lift"; Lift	10	2	24	Gold
2006	Paulini	"Rough Day"; Superwoman	26	—	4	—
2006	Shannon Noll	"Now I Run"; Lift	6	2	11	—
2006	Brielle Davis	"Serial Thriller"; Non album single	44	—	1	—
2006	Paulini	"So Over You"; Superwoman	49	—	2	—
2006	Shannon Noll	"Lonely"; Lift	8	2	17	—
2006	Guy Sebastian	"Taller, Stronger, Better"; Closer to the Sun	3	6	13	Gold
2006	Shannon Noll and Natalie; Bassingthwaighte	"Don't Give Up"; Home: Songs of Hope & Journey	2	11	21	Platinum
2006	Guy Sebastian	"Elevator Love"; Closer to the Sun	11	—	15	Gold
2007	Joel Turner	"All Night Long"; Non album single	38	—	3	—
2007	Cosima De Vito	"Keep It Natural"; This is Now	—	—	—	—
2007	Guy Sebastian	"Cover on My Heart"; Closer to the Sun	32	—	1	—
2007	Joel Turner	"City of Dreams"; Out of the Box	30	—	1	—
2007	Shannon Noll	"Loud"; Turn It Up	3	1	10	—
2007	Cosima De Vito	"Movin' On"; This is Now	—	—	—	—
2007	Shannon Noll	"In Pieces"; Turn It Up	26	—	5	—
2008	Axle Whitehead	"I Don't Do Surprises"; Losing Sleep	8	1	16	Gold
2008	Shannon Noll	"Everybody Needs a Little Help"; Turn It Up	—	—	—	—
2008	Axle Whitehead	"Anywhere"; Losing Sleep	77	—	—	—
2008	Axle Whitehead	"Satellite"; Losing Sleep	—	—	—	—
2008	Brielle Davis	"Take it Off"; Non album single	—	—	—	—
2008	Shannon Noll	"Summertime"; No Turning Back: The Story; So Far	54	—	—	—
2009	Paulini	"Scarless"; Non album single	—	—	—	—
2009	Guy Sebastian	"Like it Like That"; Like It Like That	1	12	25	5× platinum
2009	Guy Sebastian (feat. Jordin Sparks)	"Art of Love"; Like It Like That	8	5	21	2× platinum
2010	Guy Sebastian	"All To Myself"; Like It Like That	51	—	—	—
2010	Guy Sebastian	"Never Hold You Down"; Like It Like That	—	—	—	—
2010	Guy Sebastian (feat. Eve)	"Who's That Girl"; Twenty Ten	1	10	19	6× platinum
2011	Shannon Noll	"Switch Me On"; A Million Suns	42	—	4	Gold
2011	Shannon Noll	"My Place in the Line"; A Million Suns	—	—	—	—
2011	Paulini	"Show Me Your Colors"; Non album single	—	—	—	—
2011	Guy Sebastian	"Don't Worry Be Happy"; Armageddon	5	10	19	5× platinum
2012	Shannon Noll	"Living in Stereo"; A Million Suns	—	—	—	—
2012	Paulini	"Fireman"; Non album single	—	—	—	—
2012	Guy Sebastian	"Gold"; Armageddon	10	1	6	Platinum
2012	Shannon Noll	"Rewind"; A Million Suns	—	—	—	—
2012	Guy Sebastian (feat. Lupe Fiasco)	"Battle Scars"; Armageddon	1	12	25	14× platinum
2012	Shannon Noll	"Man I Can Trust"; Non album single	—	—	—	—
2012	Guy Sebastian	"Get Along"; Armageddon	5	2	14	3× platinum
2012	Guy Sebastian	"Message in a bottle" Charity single	—	—	—	—
2013	Guy Sebastian	"Dare to be Square"; Charity single	73	—	—	—
2013	Paulini	"Heartbreak is Over"; Non album single	—	—	—	—
2013	Guy Sebastian	"Like a Drum"; Madness	4	10	18	5× platinum
2014	Shannon Noll	"We Only Live Once"; Non album single	—	—	—	—
2014	Guy Sebastian	"Come Home With Me"; Madness	13	—	7	Platinum
2014	Paulini	"Air It All Out"; Come Alive	—	—	—	—
2014	Guy Sebastian (feat. 2 Chainz)	"Mama Ain't Proud"; Madness	17	—	6	Gold
2014	Guy Sebastian (feat. Lupe Fiasco)	"Linger"; Madness	17	—	10	Platinum
2015	Guy Sebastian	"Tonight Again"; Non album single	12	—	4	Gold
2015	Guy Sebastian	"Black & Blue"; Non album single	17	—	10	Platinum
2015	Paulini	"By My Side"; Come Alive	—	—	—	—
2016	Guy Sebastian	"Candle"; Part 1-EP	59	—	—	—
2016	Shannon Noll	"Who I Am"; Unbroken	56	—	—	—
2016	Guy Sebastian	"Set in Stone"; Part 1-EP	11	—	7	2× platinum
2017	Guy Sebastian	"Mind on You"; Part 1-EP	—	—	—	—
2017	Shannon Noll	"Southern Sky"; Unbroken	—	—	—	—
2017	Guy Sebastian	"High on Me"; Conscious	73	—	—	—
2017	Guy Sebastian	"Bloodstone"; Conscious	59	—	—	Platinum
2018	Shannon Noll	"Land of Mine"; Unbroken	—	—	—	—
2018	Guy Sebastian	"Before I Go"; T.R.U.T.H.	43	—	4	2× platinum
2019	Shannon Noll	"Lean on Me"; Non album single	—	—	—	—
2019	Guy Sebastian	"Choir"; T.R.U.T.H.	7	4	28	6× platinum
2019	Shannon Noll	"Long Live the Summer"; Raw	—	—	—	—
2019	Guy Sebastian (feat. The Hamiltones & Wale)	"Let Me Drink"; T.R.U.T.H.	—	—	—	Gold
2020	Shannon Noll	"Wonderful"; Raw	—	—	—	—
2020	Guy Sebastian	"Standing With You"; T.R.U.T.H.	10	1	10	2× platinum
2021	Guy Sebastian	"Love on Display"; T.R.U.T.H.	61	—	—	Platinum
2021	Shannon Noll	"Better"; Raw	—	—	—	—
2021	Guy Sebastian	"Believer"; T.R.U.T.H.	69	—	—	Gold
"—" denotes singles that did not chart or did not receive a certification.

DVDs

Year	Artist	Title		
Year	Artist	Title	Top 40 peak	Certification award
2003	2003 Top 12	Australian Idol – Uncut 2003	2	2× Platinum
2003	2003 Top 12	Australian Idol – Karaoke	18	—
2003	2003 Top 12	Australian Idol – Greatest Moments	4	Gold
2004	Shannon Noll	Up Close	2	Platinum
2005	Joel Turner, with the Modern Day Poets and the Beatbox Alliance	Beatbox	—	—
2008	Guy Sebastian	The Memphis Tour	12	Gold
"—" denotes DVDs that did not chart or did not receive a certification.

== 2004 Season Two ==
Winner – Casey Donovan
Runner up – Anthony Callea

Albums

Year	Artist	Title				
Year	Artist	Title	Chart peak	Weeks in Top 10	Weeks in Top 50	Certification award
2004	Casey Donovan	For You	2	1	6	3× platinum
2005	2004 Top 10	The Final 10 – Cast Album	20	—	3	—
2005	Anthony Callea	Anthony Callea	1	7	22	2× platinum
2005	Ricki-Lee Coulter	Ricki-Lee	30	—	2	—
2005	Chanel Cole and Daniel Belle	The Dusk Sessions	—	—	—	—
2006	Anthony Callea	A New Chapter	9	1	6	Gold
2006	Angeline Narayan	Undeniable	—	—	—	—
2007	Ricki-Lee Coulter	Brand New Day	37	—	2	Gold
2007	Hayley Jensen	Note to Self	—	—	—	—
2009	Ricki-Lee Coulter	Ricki-Lee: The Singles	—	—	—	—
2012	Ricki-Lee Coulter	Fear & Freedom	7	1	2	—
2013	Anthony Callea	Thirty	18	—	3	—
2013	Anthony Callea	This is Christmas	47	—	1	—
2014	Ricki-Lee Coulter	Dance in the Rain	14	—	1	—
2016	Anthony Callea	Backbone	1	2	4	—
2017	Anthony Callea	ARIA Number 1 Hits in Symphony	1	3	5	—
2022	Anthony Callea	Forty Love	5	1	1	—
"—" denotes albums that did not chart or did not receive a certification.

EPs

Year	Artist	Title				
Year	Artist	Title	Chart peak	Weeks in Top 10	Weeks in Top 50	Certification award
2006	Hayley Jensen	Alive	—	—	—	—
2008	Casey Donovon	Eye 2 Eye	—	—	—	—
2012	Anthony Callea	Last to Go	—	—	—	—
2017	Casey Donovon	Off the Grid & Somewhere in Between	—	—	—	—
2017	Hayley Jensen	Past Tense & Present Peace	—	—	—	—
2018	Hayley Jenson	Turn up the Dial	—	—	—	—
"—" denotes EPs that did not chart or did not receive a certification.

Singles

Year	Artist	Title				
Year	Artist	Title	Chart peak	Weeks in Top 10	Weeks in Top 50	Certification award
2004	Casey Donovan	"Listen with Your Heart"; For You	1	5	11	2× platinum
2004	Anthony Callea	"The Prayer"; Anthony Callea	1	9	17	4× platinum
2005	2004 Top 10	"Good Times"; The Final 10 – Cast Album	53	—	—	—
2005	Casey Donovan	"What's Going On?"; For You	18	—	7	—
2005	Marty Worrall	"One Day"; Non album single	—	—	—	—
2005	Anthony Callea	"Rain"/"Bridge over Troubled Water"; Anthony Callea	1	4	12	2× platinum
2005	Ricki-Lee Coulter	"Hell No!"; Ricki-Lee	5	3	11	Gold
2005	Anthony Callea	"Hurts So Bad"; Anthony Callea	10	1	7	—
2005	Casey Donovan	"Flow"; For You	51	—	—	—
2005	Ricki-Lee Coulter	"Sunshine"; Ricki-Lee	8	1	16	Gold
2005	Anthony Callea	"Per Sempre (for Always)"; Anthony Callea	5	1	10	—
2006	Ricki-Lee Coulter	"Breathe"; Ricki-Lee	14	—	8	—
2006	Anthony Callea	"Live for Love"; A New Chapter	9	1	7	—
2006	Angeline Narayan	"Chain of Fools"; Undeniable	—	—	—	—
2007	Anthony Callea	"Addicted to You"; A New Chapter	19	—	4	—
2007	Hayley Jensen	"Stronger"; Note to Self	—	—	—	—
2007	Ricki-Lee Coulter	"Can't Touch It"; Brand New Day	2	8	23	Platinum
2007	Ricki-Lee Coulter	"Love Is All Around"; Brand New Day	5	1	7	—
2008	Ricki-Lee Coulter	"Can't Sing a Different; Song"; Brand New Day	8	1	3	—
2008	Ricki-Lee Coulter	"Wiggle It"; Ricki Lee: The Singles	11	—	5	—
2009	Ricki-Lee Coulter	"Don't Miss You"; Unreleased album	24	—	5	—
2009	Ricki-Lee Coulter	"Hear No, See No, Speak No"; Unreleased album	46	—	1	—
2010	Casey Donovan	"Big, Beautiful & Sexy"; Non album single	—	—	—	—
2010	Casey Donovan	"Last Regret"; Non album single	—	—	—	—
2011	Anthony Callea	"Oh Oh Oh Oh"; Non album single	—	—	—	—
2011	Ricki-Lee Coulter	"Raining Diamonds"; Fear & Freedom	19	—	9	Platinum
2012	Ricki-Lee Coulter	"Do It Like That"; Fear & Freedom	13	—	15	Platinum
2012	Ricki-Lee Coulter	"Crazy"; Fear & Freedom	46	—	1	—
2012	Ricki-Lee Coulter	"Burn it Down"; Fear & Freedom	49	—	1	—
2013	Ricki-Lee Coulter	"Come & Get In Trouble; With Me"; Non album single	28	—	2	—
2014	Ricki-Lee Coulter	"All We Need Is Love"; Dance in the Rain	39	—	1	—
2014	Ricki-Lee Coulter	"Happy Ever After"; Dance in the Rain	65	—	—	—
2014	Ricki-Lee Coulter	"Giddyup"; Dance in the Rain	—	—	—	—
2014	Ricki-Lee Coulter	"Mirage"; Dance in the Rain	—	—	—	—
2015	Anthony Callea	"Christmas Day"; Non Album Single	—	—	—	—
2017	Casey Donovan	"Lonely"; Off the Grid & Somewhere in Between	—	—	—	—
2017	Casey Donovan	"The Villain"; Off the Grid & Somewhere in Between	—	—	—	—
2017	Ricki-Lee Coulter	""Not Too Late""; TBA	83	—	—	—
2017	Hayley Jensen	"Summertime Soundtrack"; Turning up the Dial	—	—	—	—
2018	Ricki-Lee Coulter	Unbothered; TBA	—	—	—	
2019	Hayley Jensen	"Next Big Thing " Turning up the Dial	—	—	—	—
2019	Anthony Callea	"What's Wrong With Me?"; Non album single	—	—	—	—
"—" denotes singles that did not chart or did not receive a certification.

DVDs

Year	Artist	Title		
Year	Artist	Title	Top 40 peak	Certification award
2004	2004 Top 12	Australian Idol: The Final 12 – Australian Made	3	Gold
2004	2004 Top 12	Australian Idol – Uncut 2004	18	Gold
2004	2004 Top 12	Greatest Moments	17	—
2005	Anthony Callea	Live in Concert	3	Platinum
2014	Anthony Callea	Ladies & Gentlemen: The Songs of George Michael	1	—
"—" denotes DVDs that did not chart or did not receive a certification.

== 2005 Season Three ==
Winner – Kate DeAraugo
Runner up – Emily Williams

Albums

Year	Artist	Title				
Year	Artist	Title	Chart peak	Weeks in Top 10	Weeks in Top 50	Certification award
2005	2005 Top 13	Australian Made: The Hits	30	—	1	—
2005	Kate DeAraugo	A Place I've Never Been	10	1	8	Platinum
2006	Lee Harding	What's Wrong with This; Picture?	3	2	10	Gold
2012	Emily Williams	Uncovered	—	—	—	—
"—" denotes albums that did not chart or did not receive a certification.

EPs

Year	Artist	Title				
Year	Artist	Title	Chart peak	Weeks in Top 10	Weeks in Top 50	Certification award
2006	Dan England	Dan England	89	—	—	—
"—" denotes EPs that did not chart or did not receive a certification.

Singles

Year	Artist	Title				
Year	Artist	Title	Chart peak	Weeks in Top 10	Weeks in Top 50	Certification award
2005	Kate DeAraugo	"Maybe Tonight"; A Place I've Never Been	1	7	13	Platinum
2005	Lee Harding	"Wasabi"/"Eye of the Tiger"; What's Wrong with This Picture?	1	10	21	Platinum
2006	Kate DeAraugo	"Faded"; A Place I've Never Been	8	2	15	—
2006	Lee Harding	"Anything for You"; What's Wrong with This Picture?	23	—	9	—
2006	Laura Gissara	"Ti Amo"; Non album single	49	—	1	—
2006	James Kannis	"Love 2 Love"; Non album single	35	—	3	—
2007	Roxane LeBrasse	"Sexy"; Non album single	91	—	—	—
2010	Emily Williams	"Spellbound"; Uncovered	—	—	—	—
2011	Emily Williams	"You're Mine"; Uncovered	—	—	—	—
2011	Emily Williams	"Never Alone"; Uncovered	—	—	—	—
2015	Kate DeAraugo	"It's True"; Dinasaur Island soundtrack	—	—	—	—
2015	Kate DeAraugo	"Shut Your Mouth"; Non album single	—	—	—	—
2015	Emily Williams	"The Way It Is"; Non album single	—	—	—	—
2016	Emily Williams	"Ready"; Non album single	—	—	—	—
"—" denotes singles that did not chart or did not receive a certification.

DVDs

Year	Artist	Title		
Year	Artist	Title	Top 40 peak	Certification award
2005	2005 Top 13	Australian Idol – The Final 13	5	—
"—" denotes DVDs that did not chart or did not receive a certification.

== 2006 Season Four ==
Winner – Damien Leith
Runner up – Jessica Mauboy

Albums

Year	Artist	Title				
Year	Artist	Title	Chart peak	Weeks in Top 10	Weeks in Top 50	Certification award
2006	Damien Leith	The Winner's Journey	1	10	19	4× platinum
2007	Jessica Mauboy	The Journey	4	2	6	Gold
2007	Dean Geyer	Rush	7	1	5	—
2007	Damien Leith	Where We Land	1	3	16	Platinum
2008	Bobby Flynn	Out Front	53	—	—	—
2008	Damien Leith	Catch the Wind: Songs of a Generation	2	5	11	Gold
2008	Jessica Mauboy	Been Waiting	11	—	59	2× Platinum
2009	Lisa Mitchell	Wonder	6	3	33	Platinum
2009	Damien Leith	Remember June	25	—	2	—
2010	Jessica Mauboy	Get 'Em Girls	6	2	19	Platinum
2011	Damien Leith	Roy: A Tribute To Roy Orbison	2	7	25	Platinum
2012	Damien Leith	Now and Then	12	—	4	—
2012	Lisa Mitchell	Bless This Mess	7	1	4	—
2013	Jessica Mauboy	Beautiful	3	4	29	Platinum
2013	Damien Leith	Chapter Seven	57	—	—	—
2015	Damien Leith	Songs From Ireland	11	—	5	—
2016	Jessica Mauboy	The Secret Daughter: Songs from the Original TV Series	1	11	29	Platinum
2016	Lisa Mitchell	Warriors	9	1	2	—
2017	Jessica Mauboy	The Secret Daughter Season Two: Songs from the Original 7 Series	2	12	16	Gold
2018	Damien Leith	Gospel	—	—	—	—
2019	Jessica Mauboy	Hilda	1	3	12	—
2024	Jessica Mauboy	Yours Forever	10	—	1	—
"—" denotes albums that did not chart or did not receive a certification.

EPs

Year	Artist	Title				
Year	Artist	Title	Chart peak	Weeks in Top 10	Weeks in Top 50	Certification award
2007	Lisa Mitchell	Said One To The Other	27	—	3	—
2008	Lisa Mitchell	Welcome to the Afternoon	93	—	—	—
2014	Jessica Mauboy	iTunes Session	25	—	1	—
2014	Damien Lieth	It's Christmas Time	—	—	—	—
2017	Lisa Mitchell	When They Play That Song	—	—	—	—
2018	Damien Lieth	Damien Leith Storytime	—	—	—	—
"—" denotes EPs that did not chart or did not receive a certification.

Singles

Year	Artist	Title				
Year	Artist	Title	Chart peak	Weeks in Top 10	Weeks in Top 50	Certification award
2006	Damien Leith	"Night of My Life"; The Winner's Journey	1	5	15	Platinum
2007	Dean Geyer	"If You Don't; Mean It"; Rush	10	1	12	—
2007	Damien Leith	"22 Steps"; Where We Land	11	—	7	—
2007	Joseph Gatehau	"I Gotta Say"; Non album single	—	—	—	—
2008	Jessica Mauboy (feat. Flo Rida)	"Running Back"; Been Waiting	3	8	19	2× platinum
2008	Jessica Mauboy	"Burn"; Been Waiting	1	7	23	Platinum
2009	Jessica Mauboy	"Been Waiting"; Been Waiting	12	—	14	Gold
2009	Jessica Mauboy	"Because"; Been Waiting	9	1	11	Gold
2009	Lisa Mitchell	Coin Laundry; Wonder	28	—	13	Gold
2009	Lisa Mitchell	"Neopolitan Dreams"; Wonder	70	—	—	—
2009	Jessica Mauboy	"Up/Down"; Been Waiting	11	—	15	Gold
2009	Damien Leith	"To Get To You"; Remember June	—	—	—	—
2009	Jessica Mauboy	"Let Me Be Me"; Been Waiting	26	—	9	—
2009	Lisa Mitchell	"Clean White Love"; Wonder	—	—	—	—
2010	Lisa Mitchell	"Oh! Hark"; Wonder	71	—	—	—
2010	Damien Leith	"Forgive Forget"; Remember June	65	—	—	—
2010	Jessica Mauboy (feat. Snoop Dogg)	"Get 'Em Girls"; Get 'Em Girls	19	—	6	—
2010	Jessica Mauboy (feat. Ludacris)	"Saturday Night"; Get 'Em Girls	7	4	15	2× platinum
2011	Jessica Mauboy (feat. Jay Sean)	"What Happened to Us"; Get 'Em Girls	14	—	10	Platinum
2011	Jessica Mauboy	"Inescapable"; Get 'Em Girls (deluxe edition)	4	5	16	2× platinum
2011	Jessica Mauboy (feat. Stan Walker)	"Galaxy"; Get 'Em Girls (deluxe edition)	13	—	13	Platinum
2011	Damien Leith (with Tommy Emmanuel)	"When a Child is Born"; Non album single	—	—	—	—
2012	Lisa Mitchell	"Spiritus"; Bless This Mess	66	—	—	—
2012	Damien Leith	"Beautiful"; Now and Then	—	—	—	—
2012	Jessica Mauboy	"Gotcha"; The Saphires	43	—	4	Gold
2012	Lisa Mitchell	"Bless This Mess"; Bless This Mess	92	—	—	—
2012	Damien Leith (feat. Diana Rouvas)	"Run"; Now and Then	—	—	—	—
2013	Jessica Mauboy	"Something's Got a Hold on Me"; Non album single	26	—	2	—
2013	Jessica Mauboy	"To the End of the Earth"; Beautiful	21	—	6	Gold
2013	Damien Leith	"Without a Fight"; Chapter Seven	—	—	—	—
2013	Jessica Mauboy	"Pop a Bottle (Fill Me Up)"; Beautiful	2	3	14	Platinum
2013	Jessica Mauboy	"Beautiful"; Beautiful	46	—	3	—
2014	Jessica Mauboy	"Never Be the Same"; Beautiful	6	2	13	Platinum
2014	Damien Leith	"Halfway Heart"; Chapter Seven	—	—	—	—
2014	Jessica Mauboy	"Sea of Flags"; Non album single	40	—	1	—
2014	Damien Leith	"You and I"; Chapter Seven	—	—	—	—
2014	Jessica Mauboy	"I Believe – Anything is Possible"; Non album single	—	—	—	—
2014	Damien Leith	"Someone Like You"; Non album single	—	—	—	—
2014	Lisa Mitchell	"Wah Ha"; Non album single	—	—	—	—
2014	Jessica Mauboy	"Can I Get a Moment?"; Beautiful (platinum edition)	5	2	9	Platinum
2014	Damien Leith	"One and Only Mum"; Non album single	—	—	—	—
2015	Jessica Mauboy	"The Day Before I Met You"; Beautiful (platinum edition)	41	—	1	—
2015	Jessica Mauboy	"This Ain't Love"; Non album single	5	2	8	Gold
2015	Jessica Mauboy (with Tina Arena and The Veronicas)	"Chains"; Non album single	14	—	1	—
2015	Damien Leith	"Christmas Time With You"; Non album single	—	—	—	—
2016	Jessica Mauboy	"Where I'll Stay"; Non album single	—	—	—	—
2016	Jessica Mauboy	"Wake Me Up"; The Secret Daughter: Songs from the Original TV Series	34	—	4	—
2016	Lisa Mitchell	"The Boys"; Warriors	—	—	—	
2016	Lisa Mitchell	"Warhol"; Warriors	—	—	—	—
2017	Jessica Mauboy	"Diamonds"; The Secret Daughter – The Secret Edition	—	—	—	—
2017	Jessica Mauboy	"Fallin'"; The Secret Daughter Season Two: Songs from the Original 7 Series	11	—	17	2× Platinum
2017	Jessica Mauboy	"Then I Met You"; The Secret Daughter Season Two: Songs from the Original 7 Series	—	—	—	—
2017	Lisa Mitchell	"California"; When They Play That Song	—	—	—	
2018	Jessica Mauboy	"We Got Love" non album single	31	—	2	—
2018	Damien Leith	"I Don't Wanna Be"; Non album single	—	—	—	—
2018	Damien Leith	"That Moment Just Before"; Non album single	—	—	—	—
2019	Jessica Mauboy	"Sunday"; Hilda	—	—	—	—
2019	Jessica Mauboy	"Little Things"; Hilda	25	—	12	2× platinum
2019	Jessica Mauboy	"Selfish"; Hilda	—	—	—	—
2023	Jessica Mauboy (featuring Jason Derulo)	"Give You Love"; Yours Forever	74	—	—	Gold
"—" denotes singles that did not chart or did not receive a certification.

DVDs

Year	Artist	Title		
Year	Artist	Title	Top 40 peak	Certification award
2006	2006 Top 12	The Final 12: 2006	7	Gold
"—" denotes DVDs that did not chart or did not receive a certification.

== 2007 Season Five ==
Winner – Natalie Gauci
Runner up – Matt Corby

Albums

Year	Artist	Title				
Year	Artist	Title	Chart peak	Weeks in Top 10	Weeks in Top 50	Certification award
2007	Natalie Gauci	The Winner's Journey	11	—	6	Platinum
2008	Carl Riseley	The Rise	5	3	5	—
2009	Carl Riseley	The Stillest Hour	21	—	3	—
2012	Natalie Gauci	Ha Ha Ha	—	—	—	—
2016	Matt Corby	Telluric	1	4	14	Gold
2017	Natalie Gauci	Pictures of Mars	—	—	—	—
2018	Matt Corby	Rainbow Valley	4	1	2	–
2023	Matt Corby	Everything's Fine	8	1	1	–
2026	Matt Corby	Tragic Magic	3	1	2	–
"—" denotes albums that did not chart or did not receive a certification.

EPs

Year	Artist	Title				
Year	Artist	Title	Chart peak	Weeks in Top 10	Weeks in Top 50	Certification award
2009	Matt Corby	Song For...	—	—	—	—
2010	Matt Corby	My False	—	—	—	—
2010	Matt Corby	Transition To Colour	—	—	—	—
2010	Natalie Gauci	I'm Ready	—	—	—	—
2011	Matt Corby	Into The Flame	3(Singles Chart)	2	36	10× Platinum
2011	Natalie Gauci	Free Falling	—	—	—	—
2012	Matt Corby	iTunes Session	19(Albums Chart)	—	1	—
2012	Natalie Gauci	Elektrik Field	—	—	—	—
2013	Matt Corby	Live on the Resolution Tour	48(Albums Chart)	—	1	—
"—" denotes EPs that did not chart or did not receive a certification.

Singles

Year	Artist	Title				
Year	Artist	Title	Chart peak	Weeks in Top 10	Weeks in Top 50	Certification award
2007	Natalie Gauci	"Here I Am"; The Winner's Journey	2	4	8	Gold
2009	Matt Corby	"Letters"; Song For...	—	—	—	—
2010	Natalie Gauci	"Without You"; Non album single	—	—	—	—
2010	Matt Corby	"My False"; My False	—	—	—	—
2010	Matt Corby	"Made of Stone"; Transition to Colour	—	—	—	—
2011	Matt Corby	"Brother"; Into the Flame	—	—	—	—
2011	Natalie Gauci	"C U Later"; Non album single	—	—	—	—
2013	Matt Corby	"Resolution"; Non album single	5	7	18	7× Platinum
2015	Matt Corby	"Monday"; Telluric	45	—	1	Gold
2015	Matt Corby	"Sooth Lady Wine"; Telluric	93	—	—	—
2018	Matt Corby	"No Ordinary Life"; Rainbow Valley	—	—	—	Gold
2018	Matt Corby	"All Fired Up"; Rainbow Valley	—	—	—	Gold
2018	Matt Corby	"All That I See"; Rainbow Valley	—	—	—	—
2018	Matt Corby	"Miracle Love"; Rainbow Valley	—	—	—	3× Platinum
2019	Matt Corby (with Tash Sultana)	"Talk it Out; TBA	—	—	—	Platinum
2019	Matt Corby (with Triple One and Kwame	"So Easy"; Non album single	—	—	—	Gold
"—" denotes singles that did not chart or did not receive a certification.

DVDs

Year	Artist	Title		
Year	Artist	Title	Top 40 peak	Certification award
2007	2007 Top 12	Australian Idol – Best of 2007	—	—
"—" denotes DVDs that did not chart or did not receive a certification.

== 2008 Season Six ==
Winner – Wes Carr
Runner up – Luke Dickens

Albums

Year	Artist	Title				
Year	Artist	Title	Chart peak	Weeks in Top 10	Weeks in Top 50	Certification award
2008	Wes Carr	Simple Sum	—	—	—	—
2009	Wes Carr	The Way the World Looks	2	3	13	Gold
2008	Luke Dickens	Underdog	—	—	—	—
2013	Wes Carr (as Buffalo Tales)	Roadtrip Confessions	83	—	—	—
2018	Wes Carr	Australiana	—	—	—	—
"—" denotes albums that did not chart or did not receive a certification.

EPs

Year	Artist	Title				
Year	Artist	Title	Chart peak	Weeks in Top 10	Weeks in Top 50	Certification award
2012	Wes Carr (as Buffalo Tales)	Blood and Bone	—	—	—	—
"—" denotes EPs that did not chart or did not receive a certification.

Singles

Year	Artist	Song and album title				
Year	Artist	Song and album title	Chart peak	Weeks in Top 10	Weeks in Top 50	Certification award
2008	Wes Carr	"You"; The Way the World Looks	1	6	14	Gold
2009	Wes Carr	"Feels Like Woah"; The Way the World Looks	14	—	15	Gold
2009	Wes Carr	"Fearless"; The Way The World Looks	51	—	—	—
2009	Wes Carr	"Love Is An Animal"; The Way The World Looks	61	—	—	—
2009	Luke Dickens	"Seize The Day"; Underdog	—	—	—	—
2010	Tom Williams	"LOL"; Non album single	—	—	—	—
2010	Luke Dickens	"Believer"; Underdog	—	—	—	—
2011	Madam Parker	"I Found You"; Non album single	—	—	—	—
2011	Wes Carr	"Been a Long Time"; Non album single	33	—	3	—
2013	Wes Carr (as Buffalo Tales)	"Amsterdam"; Roadtrip Confessions	—	—	—	—
2014	Wes Carr	"Anthem"; Non album single	—	—	—	—
2013	Wes Carr	"People of Peace"; Non album single	—	—	—	—
2013	Wes Carr	"Home"; Non album single	—	—	—	—
"—" denotes singles that did not chart or did not receive a certification.

== 2009 Season Seven ==
Winner – Stan Walker
Runner up – Hayley Warner

Albums

Year	Artist	Title				
Year	Artist	Title	Chart peak	Weeks in Top 10	Weeks in Top 50	Certification award
2009	Stan Walker	Introducing... Stan; Walker	3	4	9	Platinum
2010	Stan Walker	From the Inside Out	2	2	7	—
2011	Stan Walker	Let the Music Play	18	—	2	—
2012	Casey Barnes	Jet Trails	—	—	—	—
2013	Stan Walker	Inventing Myself	—	—	—	—
2015	Stan Walker	Truth & Soul	7	1	4	—
2016	Casey Barnes	Live as One	—	—	97	—
2018	Casey Barnes	The Good Life	—	—	—	—
"—" denotes albums that did not chart or did not receive a certification.

EPs

Year	Artist	Title				
Year	Artist	Title	Chart peak	Weeks in Top 10	Weeks in Top 50	Certification award
2010	Casey Barnes	Red Lion Motel	—	—	—	—
2010	Hayley Warner	Hands Off	—	—	—	—
2014	Casey Barnes	Flesh & Bone	—	—	—	—
2018	Stan Walker	Stan	—	—	—	—
"—" denotes EPs that did not chart or did not receive a certification.

Singles

Year	Artist	Title				
Year	Artist	Title	Chart peak	Weeks in Top 10	Weeks in Top 50	Certification award
2009	Stan Walker	"Black Box"; Introducing... Stan Walker	2	9	20	2× Platinum
2009	Hayley Warner	"Good Day"; Non album single	11	—	6	Gold
2010	Kate Cook^{†}	"Make You Stay"; Non album single	—	—	—	—
2010	Stan Walker	"Unbroken"; From the Inside Out	23	—	11	Gold
2010	Casey Barnes	"I Promise"; Red Lion MotelEP	—	—	—	—
2010	Stan Walker	"Choose You"; From The Inside Out	16	—	14	Platinum
2010	Hayley Warner	"Hands Off"; Hands Off EP	—	—	—	—
2010	Scott Newnham	"Really Me"; Non album single	—	—	—	—
2010	Stan Walker (featuring Kao)	"Homesick"; From the Inside Out	—	—	—	—
2011	Casey Barnes	"Never Break You"; Non album single	47	—	1	—
2011	Stan Walker	"Loud"; Let the Music Play	9	2	16	Platinum
2011	Hayley Warner	"Best Thing"; Non album single	—	—	—	—
2011	Stan Walker (featuring Static Revenger)	"Light It Up"; Let the Music Play	45	—	1	Gold
2012	Stan Walker	"Music Won't Break Your Heart"; Let the Music Play	25	—	3	Gold
2013	Stan Walker	"Take It Easy"; Mt. Zion	—	—	—	—
2013	Casey Barnes	"Running to You"; Non album single	—	—	—	—
2013	Stan Walker	"Bulletproof"; Inventing Myself	—	—	—	—
2013	Stan Walker	"Inventing Myself"; Inventing Myself	—	—	—	—
2013	Casey Barnes	"Livin’ Like a Love Song"; Non album single	—	—	—	—
2013	Stan Walker (feat Ria Hall)	"Like It's Over"; Inventing Myself	—	—	—	—
2014	Stan Walker (with Ginny Blackmore)	"Holding You"; Non album single	43	—	1	—
2014	Casey Barnes	"Against the World"; Non album single	—	—	—	—
2014	Stan Walker (with Ginny Blackmore)	"I Can't Make You Love Me; Non album single	—	—	—	—
2014	Casey Barnes	"Valentine"; Flesh & Bone	—	—	—	—
2014	Stan Walker (feat Ria Hall, Troy Kingi and Maisey Rika)	"Aotearoa"; Non album single	—	—	—	—
2014	Scott Newnham	"Prove Me Wrong"; Non album single	—	—	—	—
2014	Casey Barnes	"Flesh & Bone"; Flesh & Bone EP	—	—	—	—
2014	Casey Barnes	"Waiting on the Day"; Flesh & Bone EP	—	—	—	—
2015	Stan Walker (feat. Samantha Jade)	"Start Again"; Born to Dance	—	—	—	—
2015	Casey Barnes	"Hard Times"; Flesh & Bone EP	—	—	—	—
2015	Hayley Warner	"Closure"; Non album single	—	—	—	—
2016	Stan Walker	"You Never Know"; Non album single	86	—	—	—
2016	Casey Barnes	"Live as One"; Live as One	—	—	—	—
2016	Casey Barnes	"Just Like Magic"; Live as One	—	—	—	—
2017	Stan Walker	"Messages"; Non album single	—	—	—	—
2017	Casey Barnes	"The Way We Ride"; The Good Life	—	—	—	—
2017	Stan Walker (with Parson James)	"Tennessee Whiskey"; Non album single	—	—		—
2017	Casey Barnes	"Keep Me Coming Back"; The Good Life	—	—	—	—
2017	Stan Walker	"New Takeover"; Non album single	—	—	—	—
2017	Stan Walker	"Find You (The Stolen)"; Stan	—	—	—	—
2018	Stan Walker	"Thank You"; Stan	—	—	—	—
2018	Casey Barnes	"Ain't Coming Home"; The Good Life	—	—	—	—
2018	Stan Walker	"Gimme Your Love"; TBA	—	—	—	—
2018	Casey Barnes	"Be Mine"; The Good Life	—	—	—	—
2019	Stan Walker	"Give"; TBA	—	—	—	—
"—" denotes singles that did not chart or did not receive a certification.

== Young Divas ==
The Young Divas was a group of four female contestants from various Idol years, active during 2006 and 2007. Originally the group was made up of Season One finalist Paulini, Season Two finalist Ricki-Lee Coulter, and Season Three winner and runner up Kate DeAraugo and Emily Williams. After the first album Coulter left the group and was replaced by Season Four runner up Jessica Mauboy. The group disbanded after the second album.

Albums

Year	Artist	Title				
Year	Artist	Title	Chart peak	Weeks in Top 10	Weeks in Top 50	Certification award
2006	Young Divas	Young Divas	4	5	17	2× platinum
2007	Young Divas	New Attitude	10	1	8	Gold

Singles

Year	Artist	Song and album title				
Year	Artist	Song and album title	Chart peak	Weeks in Top 10	Weeks in Top 50	Certification award
2006	Young Divas	"This Time I Know It's for Real"; Young Divas	2	14	30	Platinum
2006	Young Divas	"Happenin' All over Again"; Young Divas	9	2	11	Gold
2007	Young Divas	"Searchin'"; Young Divas	40	—	2	—
2007	Young Divas	"Turn Me Loose"; New Attitude	15	—	15	—
"—" denotes singles that did not enter the top ten and receive a certification.

== Certification totals ==
Release history and total certifications

Current ARIA Accreditation levels for album and singles:

- Gold: 35,000 units
- Platinum: 70,000 units

Artist	Albums and EPs released					Singles released				Total certifications		
Artist	Albums	EPs	Certified	Top 10s	No. 1s	Singles	Certified	Top 10s	No. 1s	Platinum	Gold	Sales
Guy Sebastian	11	2	9	11	3	35	26	15	6	82	7	5,985,000+
Jessica Mauboy	8	1	6	7	2	32	17	9	1	20	8	1,785,000+
Matt Corby	3	6	2	4	1	13	7	1	—	21	5	1,645,000+
Shannon Noll	7	—	3	7	2	26	8	10	3	17	3	1,295,000+
Anthony Callea	7	1	2	5	3	10	2	5	2	8	1	595,000+
Damien Leith	9	2	4	4	2	15	1	1	1	7	1	525,000+
Stan Walker	5	1	1	3	—	23	6	2	—	5	3	455,000+
Casey Donovan	1	1	1	1	—	8	1	1	1	5	—	350,000+
Ricki-Lee	4	—	1	1	—	19	5	5	—	3	3	315,000+
Young Divas	2	—	2	2	—	4	2	2	—	3	2	280,000+
2003 Top 12	1	—	1	1	—	1	1	1	1	2	1	175,000+
Paulini	4	1	1	1	1	10	1	1	1	2	—	140,000+
Joel Turner	2	—	1	—	—	6	1	1	1	2	—	140,000+
Kate DeAraugo	1	—	1	1	—	4	1	2	1	2	—	140,000+
Cosima	2	—	1	1	—	4	1	1	1	1	1	105,000+
Lee Harding	1	—	1	1	—	2	1	1	1	1	1	105,000+
Natalie Gauci	3	2	1	—	—	3	1	1	—	1	1	105,000+
Lisa Mitchell	3	3	1	3	—	10	1	—	—	1	1	105,000+
Wes Carr	4	1	1	1	—	9	2	1	1	—	3	105,000+
Robert Mills	1	—	—	—	—	2	1	1	–	—	1	35,000+
Axle Whitehead	1	—	—	—	—	3	1	1	—	—	1	35,000+
Hayley Warner	—	1	—	—	—	4	1	—	—	—	1	35,000+

Album certifications

Artist	Platinum	Gold	Sales
Guy Sebastian	17	1	1,225,000+
Shannon Noll	9	—	630,000+
Damien Leith	6	1	455,000+
Jessica Mauboy	5	2	420,000+
Casey Donovan	3	—	210,000+
Anthony Callea	2	1	175,000+
Young Divas	2	1	175,000+
2003 Top 12	2	—	140,000+
Paulini	1	—	70,000+
Joel Turner	1	—	70,000+
Kate DeAraugo	1	—	70,000+
Natalie Gauci	1	—	70,000+
Lisa Mitchell	1	—	70,000+
Stan Walker	1	—	70,000+
Cosima De Vito	—	1	35,000+
Lee Harding	—	1	35,000+
Ricki-Lee Coulter	—	1	35,000+
Wes Carr	—	1	35,000+
Matt Corby	—	1	35,000+

EP certifications

Artist	Platinum	Gold	Sales
Matt Corby	10	—	700,000+

Single certifications

Artist	Platinum	Gold	Sales
Guy Sebastian	65	6	4,760,000+
Jessica Mauboy	16	7	1,365,000+
Matt Corby	11	4	910,000+
Shannon Noll	8	3	665,000+
Anthony Callea	6	—	420,000+
Stan Walker	4	3	385,000+
Ricki-Lee	3	2	280,000+
Matt Corby	3	1	245,000+
Casey Donovan	2	—	140,000+
Young Divas	1	1	105,000+
Paulini	1	—	70,000+
Cosima	1	—	70,000+
Joel Turner	1	—	70,000+
Kate DeAraugo	1	—	70,000+
Lee Harding	1	—	70,000+
Damien Leith	1	—	70,000+
Wes Carr	—	2	70,000+
2003 Top 12	—	1	35,000+
Rob Mills	—	1	35,000+
Natalie Gauci	—	1	35,000+
Axle Whitehead	—	1	35,000+
Lisa Mitchell	—	1	35,000+
Hayley Warner	—	1	35,000+

DVD Certifications

Current ARIA Accreditation levels for DVDs:

- Gold: 7,500 units
- Platinum: 15,000 units

Artist	Platinum	Gold	Sales
2003 Top 12	2	1	45,000+
Shannon Noll	1	—	15,000+
Anthony Callea	1	—	15,000+
2004 Top 12	—	2	15,000+
Guy Sebastian	—	1	7,500+
2006 Top 12	—	1	7,500+

== Chart achievements ==
=== Australian Idol records ===
Highest selling Australian Idol albums^{[a]}

- 2003 Just as I Am, Guy Sebastian – 6× platinum
- 2004 That's What I'm Talking About, Shannon Noll – 5× platinum
- 2006 The Winner's Journey, Damien Leith – 4× platinum
- 2005 Lift, Shannon Noll – 3× platinum
- 2004 For You, Casey Donovan – 3× platinum
- 2012 Armageddon, Guy Sebastian 3× platinum

Note a Just as I Am had documented retail sales of 480,000, just short of 7× platinum

Best chart runs – Albums

- Most weeks at number one – The Winner's Journey, Damien Leith (5 weeks)
- Most weeks in top ten – That's What I'm Talking About, Shannon Noll and Armageddon, Guy Sebastian (14 weeks)
- Most weeks in top 50 – Been Waiting, Jessica Mauboy (59 weeks)

Highest selling Australian Idol EP

- Into the Flame, Matt Corby – 10× platinum

Best chart runs – EPs

- Highest peak – Into the Flame, Matt Corby (number three)
- Most weeks in top ten – Into the Flame, Matt Corby (2 weeks)
- Most weeks in top 50 – Into the Flame, Matt Corby (36 weeks)

Highest selling Australian Idol singles

- 2012 "Battle Scars", Guy Sebastian (feat. Lupe Fiasco) – 14× platinum
- 2013 "Resolution", Matt Corby - 7× platinum
- 2010 "Who's That Girl", Guy Sebastian (feat. Eve) – 6× platinum
- 2019 "Choir", Guy Sebastian – 6× platinum
- 2003 "Angels Brought Me Here", Guy Sebastian – 5× platinum
- 2009 "Like it Like That", Guy Sebastian – 5× platinum
- 2011 "Don't Worry Be Happy", Guy Sebastian – 5× platinum
- 2013 "Like a Drum", Guy Sebastian – 5× platinum

Best chart runs – Singles

- Most weeks at number one – "Battle Scars", Guy Sebastian featuring Lupe Fiasco(6 weeks)
- Most weeks in top ten – "These Kids", Joel Turner (15 weeks)
- Most weeks in top 50 – "This Time I Know It's for Real", Young Divas (30 weeks)

=== Australian chart records ===
- Guy Sebastian's album Just as I Am – Second highest one week sales ever recorded in Australia, and the highest for an Australian artist. Sold 163,711 units in its first week of release.
- Guy Sebastian – Only male Australian artist to achieve six number one singles in Australian chart history, and he is third overall for all Australian acts. Only Kylie Minogue and Delta Goodrem have achieved more.
- Shannon Noll – Noll's first ten singles released between 2004 and 2007 all reached the top ten of the ARIA Singles Chart, making him the only male Australian artist to achieve ten consecutive top ten singles in Australian chart history. John Farnham, Jimmy Barnes and Sebastian have all achieved more than ten, but they were nonconsecutive.
- Guy Sebastian's single "Angels Brought Me Here" – Held the record of being the highest selling Australian artist song of all time until 2011. Prior to 2003 the highest recorded sales for an Australian artist song were for John Farnham's 1968 single "Sadie (The Cleaning Lady)" with sales of 180,000+ units. "Angels Brought Me Here" became the first Australian artist song in chart history to reach 4× platinum certification and eventually achieved 5× platinum certification in 2019. It remained the highest selling Australian artist song until its sales were surpassed by Gotye's "Somebody That I Used to Know" in 2011. Since then a number of other Australian songs have also reached much higher than 4× platinum certification, including Sebastian's own single "Battle Scars" featuring Lupe Fiasco which has achieved 14× platinum certification.
- Anthony Callea's single "The Prayer" – Highest one week single sales for both an Australian artist and an artist on debut, and second highest one week sales in Australian Chart history for any artist, behind Elton John's Princess Diana tribute "Candle in the Wind". "The Prayer" sold over 147,000 copies in its first full week of sales. Sebastian has the second highest one week sales for an Australian artist and third overall with 128,679 copies of "Angels Brought Me Here" sold in its first week.

=== End of Decade Charts ===
In January 2010 the Australian Recording Industry Association released a report of the 100 highest selling singles and albums of the decade 2000 – 2009. Eight idol releases featured in the lists. Australian Idol contestants had three of the five highest selling singles of the decade, with only one other Australian song in the top twenty. Guy Sebastian and Matt Corby also appeared in the highest selling releases of the 2010 – 2019 decade.

2000 – 2009

Artist	Year	Title	Certification	Australian artist rank.	Overall rank.
Albums
Guy Sebastian	2003	Just As I Am	6× platinum	9	28
Shannon Noll	2004	That's What I'm Talking About	5× platinum	12	37
Damien Leith	2006	The Winner's Journey	4× platinum	18	61
Singles
Guy Sebastian	2003	"Angels Brought Me Here"	5× platinum	1	1
Anthony Callea	2004	"The Prayer"	4× platinum	2	2
Shannon Noll	2004	"What About Me"	4× platinum	3	5
Guy Sebastian	2009	"Like it Like That"	5× platinum	6	29
Joel Turner	2004	"These Kids"	Platinum	8	47

2010 – 2019

Artist	Year	Title	Certification	Australian artist rank.	Overall rank.
Albums
Guy Sebastian	2012	Armageddon	3× platinum	7	51
Guy Sebastian	2010	Twenty Ten	2× platinum	16	84
Singles
Guy Sebastian	2012	"Battle Scars" (feat. Lupe Fiasco)	14× platinum	3	19
Matt Corby	2011	"Brother" (Into the Flame EP)	10× platinum	8	68

=== ARIA Music Awards ===
As well as administering the official Australian music charts, ARIA also holds the annual ARIA Music Awards to recognise excellence, innovation and achievement in Australian music. The awards have industry judged and highest selling categories, and since 2010 public vote categories where the criteria for selection as a nominee is most commonly being one of the highest selling acts during the year. Australian Idol contestants have been nominated for 109 ARIA Awards since 2004, with 24 highest selling nominations, 35 nominations for publicly voted categories, and 50 industry judged nominations. Guy Sebastian has received the most nominations with 34, including seven wins. Jessica Mauboy has had 31 nominations including two wins, and Matt Corby 11 with two wins. Shannon Noll has received six nominations. In 2013 Sebastian and Mauboy became the first Idol contestants to win industry voted ARIA Awards. Sebastian for Best Pop Release, and Mauboy for Best Female Artist.

== International releases ==
Nine Australian Idol contestants have charted outside of Australia with at least one release, in countries including New Zealand, Ireland, Germany, Norway and the UK. Stan Walker and Guy Sebastian have achieved multiple chart entries and certifications in New Zealand. Sebastian has also achieved three certified singles in Sweden, and is currently the only Australian Idol contestant to chart in the United States. "Battle Scars", a collaboration with Lupe Fiasco, reached number 71 on the Billboard Hot 100 Chart, number 23 on the Billboard Digital Song Chart and number one on the R&B/Hip-Hop Digital Song Chart. The song spent 20 weeks in the Hot 100, and has been certified triple platinum for sales of three million. In January 2013 Ricki-Lee Coulter's "Do It Like That" reached number seven on the Japan Hot 100. Matt Corby's debut album Telluric charted in four European countries in 2016.

Current New Zealand certification levels:

- Gold 7,500
- Platinum 15,000

Current US certification levels:

- Gold 500,000
- Platinum 1,000,000

Current Swedish certification levels:

- Gold 20,000
- Platinum 40,000

Albums

Year	Artist	Title	Peak position								Certification
Year	Artist	Title	BEL	IRE	JPN	NL	NZ	NOR	SWE	UK	Certification
2003	Guy Sebastian	Just as I Am	—	—	—	—	3	—	—	—	NZ: 2× Platinum
2004	Shannon Noll	That's What I'm Talking About	—	—	—	—	31	—	—	—	—
2007	Damien Leith	Where We Land	—	43	—	—	—	—	—	—	—
2008	Ricki-Lee Coulter	Brand New Day	—	—	242	—	—	—	—	—	—
2009	Jessica Mauboy	Been Waiting	—	—	138	—	—	—	—	—	—
2009	Stan Walker	Introducing... Stan Walker	—	—	—	—	2	—	—	—	NZ: 3× Platinum
2010	Guy Sebastian	Like It Like That	—	—	—	—	28	—	—	—	—
2010	Stan Walker	From the Inside Out	—	—	—	—	1	—	—	—	NZ: Platinum
2010	Guy Sebastian	Twenty Ten	—	—	—	—	24	—	—	—	NZ:Gold
2011	Stan Walker	Let the Music Play	—	—	—	—	12	—	—	—	—
2012	Ricki-Lee Coulter	Fear & Freedom	—	—	45	—	—	—	—	—	—
2012	Guy Sebastian	Armageddon	—	—	—	—	20	—	—	—	NZ:Platinum
2013	Stan Walker	Inventing Myself	—	—	—	—	3	—	—	—	NZ: Gold
2015	Stan Walker	Truth & Soul	—	—	—	—	3	—	—	—	—
2015	Guy Sebastian	Madness	—	—	—	—	—	—	34	—	—
2016	Matt Corby	Telluric	61	—	—	66	4	33	—	36	—
2015	Matt Corby	Rainbow Valley	—	—	—	—	30	—	—	—	—
2018	Stan Walker	Stan	—	—	—	—	17	—	—	—	—
2020	Guy Sebastian	T.R.U.T.H.	—	—	—	—	39	—	—	—	—
"—" denotes albums that did not chart in that country or did not receive a certification.

Singles

Year	Artist	Song and album title	Peak position													Certification
Year	Artist	Song and album title	AUT	FRA	GER	ISL	IRE	JPN	NL	NZ	NOR	SWE	SWI	UK	US	Certification
2003	Guy Sebastian	"Angels Brought Me Here"; Just As I Am	—	—	—	—	—	—	—	1	—	—	—	—	—	NZ: Platinum
2004	Shannon Noll	"What About Me"; That's What I'm Talking About	—	—	—	—	2	—	—	10	—	—	—	—	—	—
2004	Guy Sebastian	"All I Need Is You"; Just as I Am	—	—	—	—	—	—	—	5	—	—	—	—	—	—
2004	Paulini	"Angel Eyes"; One Determined Heart	—	—	—	—	—	—	—	34	—	—	—	—	—	—
2007	Damien Leith	"Night of My Life"; The Winner's Journey	—	—	—	—	8	—	—	—	—	—	—	—	—	—
2008	Lisa Mitchell	"Neopolitan Dreams"; Welcome to the Afternoon EP	—	—	33	—	—	—	—	—	—	—	—	156	—	—
2009	Stan Walker	"Black Box"; Introducing... Stan Walker	—	—	—	—	—	—	—	1	—	—	—	—	—	NZ: 2× Platinum
2010	Guy Sebastian (feat. Jordin Sparks)	"Art Of Love"; Like It Like That	—	—	—	—	—	—	—	7	—	—	—	—	—	NZ: Platinum
2010	Stan Walker	"Unbroken"; From the Inside Out	—	—	—	—	—	—	—	9	—	—	—	—	—	NZ: Gold
2010	Stan Walker	"Choose You"; From the Inside Out	—	—	—	—	—	—	—	3	—	—	—	—	—	NZ: Platinum
2010	Stan Walker (feat. Kao)	"Homesick"; From the Inside Out	—	—	—	—	—	—	—	21	—	—	—	—	—	NZ: Gold
2010	Guy Sebastian (feat. Eve)	"Who's That Girl"; Twenty Ten	—	—	—	—	—	—	—	1	—	—	—	—	—	NZ:2× Platinum
2011	Guy Sebastian	"Like it Like That"; Twenty Ten	—	—	—	—	—	—	—	30	—	—	—	—	—	NZ: Gold
2011	Stan Walker	"Loud"; Let the Music Play	—	—	—	—	—	—	—	8	—	—	—	—	—	NZ: Gold
2011	Stan Walker (feat. Static Revenger)	"Light It Up"; Let the Music Play	—	—	—	—	—	—	—	23	—	—	—	—	—	NZ: Gold
2011	Jessica Mauboy (feat. Stan Walker)	"Galaxy"; Get 'Em Girls	—	—	—	—	—	—	—	36	—	—	—	—	—	NZ: Gold
2012	Guy Sebastian	"Don't Worry Be Happy"; Armageddon	—	—	—	—	—	—	—	26	—	—	—	—	—	NZ: Gold
2012	Stan Walker	"Music Won't Break Your Heart"; Let the Music Play	—	—	—	—	—	—	—	32	—	—	—	—	—	—
2012	Matt Corby	"Brother"; Into the Flame	—	—	—	—	—	—	32	—	—	—	—	—	—	—
2012	Guy Sebastian (feat. Lupe Fiasco)	"Battle Scars"; Armaggedon and Food & Liquor II: The Great American Rap Album Pt. 1	—	—	—	—	—	—	—	2	2	46	—	—	71	US: 3× Platinum; NZ: 3× Platinum; SWE: Gold
2012	Stan Walker	"Take It Easy"; Mt. Zion and Inventing Myself	—	—	—	—	—	—	—	5	—	—	—	—	—	NZ: 2× platinum
2012	Guy Sebastian	"Get Along"; Armageddon	—	—	—	—	—	—	—	9	—	—	—	—	—	NZ: Gold
2012	Ricki-Lee Coulter	"Do It Like That"; Fear & Freedom	—	—	—	—	—	7	—	—	—	—	—	—	—	—
2012	Stan Walker	"Bulletproof"; Inventing Myself	—	—	—	—	—	—	—	2	—	—	—	—	—	NZ: Platinum
2012	Stan Walker	"Inventing Myself"; Inventing Myself	—	—	—	—	—	—	—	27	—	—	—	—	—	—
2013	Jessica Mauboy	"Pop a Bottle (Fill Me Up)"; Beautiful	—		—	—	—	—	—	33	—	—	—	—	—	—
2013	Stan Walker (feat. Ria Hall)	"Like Its Over"; Inventing Myself	—	—	—	—	—	—	—	19	—	—	—	—	—	NZ: Gold
2013	Matt Corby	"Resolution"; Non album single	—	—	—	—	—	—	—	16	—	—	—	150	—	NZ: Gold
2013	Guy Sebastian	Like a Drum"; Madness	—	183	—	—	—	—	—	13	—	49	—	—	—	NZ: Platinum; SWE: Platinum
2014	Stan Walker (with Ginny Blackmore)	"Holding You"; Holding You EP	—	—	—	—	—	—	—	1	—	—	—	—	—	NZ: Platinum
2014	Stan Walker (with Ginny Blackmore)	"I Can't Make You Love Me"; Holding You EP	—	—	—	—	—	—	—	24	—	—	—	—	—	—
2014	Stan Walker (featuring Ria Hall, Troy Kingi and Maisey Rika)	"Aotearoa"; Non album single	—	—	—	—	—	—	—	2	—	—	—	—	—	NZ: Gold
2014	Guy Sebastian (feat.2 Chainz)	"Mama Ain't Proud" "Madness"	—	—	92	—	—	—	—	—	—	—	—	—	—	—
2015	Guy Sebastian	"Tonight Again"; Non album single	16	—	44	5	—	—	71	—	—	22	47	178	—	SWE: Gold
2016	Guy Sebastian	"Set in Stone; EP: Part 1	—	—	—	—	—	—	—	— (Note: "Set in Stone" did not enter the NZ Top 40 Singles Chart, but peaked at number 10 on the NZ Heatseeker Singles Chart.)	—	—	—	—	—	NZ:Gold
2018	Jessica Mauboy	"We Got Love"; Non album single	—	—	—	—	—	—	—	—	—	—	86	58	—	—
2018	Guy Sebastian	"Before I Go"; T.R.U.T.H.	—	—	—	—	—	—	41	—	—	—	—	—	—	NL:Platinum:
2019	Guy Sebastian	"Choir"; T.R.U.T.H.	—	—	—	—	—	—	—	— (Note: "Choir" did not enter the NZ Top 40 Singles Chart, but peaked at number 40 on the NZ Hot Singles Chart.)	—	—	—	—	—	NZ:Platinum
2020	Guy Sebastian	"Standing with You"; T.R.U.T.H.	—	—	—	—	—	—	—	— (Note: "Standing with You" did not enter the NZ Top 40 Singles Chart, but peaked at number 12 on the NZ Hot Singles Chart.)	—	—	—	—	—	NZ:Gold
"—" denotes singles that did not chart in that country or did not receive a certification.
