= Been a Long Time =

Single by Wes Carr
- Released: 10 June 2011
- Recorded: Los Angeles, California
- Genre: Pop
- Length: 3:05
- Label: Sony Music
- Songwriter: Wes Carr
- Producer: Gary Clark

Wes Carr singles chronology
"Love is an Animal" (2009)	"Been a Long Time" (2011)

"Been a Long Time" is a song by Australian recording artist Wes Carr. It was released for digital download on 10 June 2011.

== Background ==
Wes Carr wrote "Been a Long Time" in Los Angeles, California, in which took him 10 minutes to write. It was produced by Scottish musician Gary Clark. Speaking on how the song came about, in an interview with The Australian, Carr said

"I was living in the heart of LA on the Sunset Strip, and feeling bombarded with the bustle of the city, so I drove into the desert, towards the Joshua Tree National Park. I got lost, but all the stuff I'd loaded on myself in the previous two years seemed to slip away and my mojo began to flow again. It was like it had 'been a long time' since I had felt that free."

In an interview with Adelaide Now, Carr revealed while he was on his way to Nashville in August 2010 to write songs, he told flight attendants he had to get off the plane. He said, "I was having a full-blown panic attack, people were taking photos of me with their phones and I had to get off the plane. It was horrible." Carr also revealed that the song details some of the desperation he felt as he tried to figure out why he felt so alienated and panicked all the time. "Been a Long Time" was sent to Australian contemporary hit radio and adult contemporary radio on 12 May 2011. A week later, it became the most-added song to Australian radio. The song was released for digital download on 10 June 2011.

== Music video ==
The music video to the song was filmed in Byron Bay, New South Wales, and was premiered on Vevo on 11 May 2011. The video opens showing Carr playing the ukulele in a bedroom while singing the first verse. The video is then intercut with scenes of Carr playing the guitar on the back of a ute. He then heads towards the beach and continues singing the song with the guitar to a group of friends. Carr can then be seen standing on the train tracks located in a forest. The video is then intercut with scenes of Carr playing the piano at a party, and the guitar in the backseat of a car. The last scene sees Carr back on the beach with a group of friends singing to the song together and having fun.

== Live performances ==
In June 2011, Carr was interviewed by Take 40 Australia, and later performed an acoustic version of "Been a Long Time". On 10 June, Carr performed the song with a ukulele aboard the Sydney ferry for unsuspecting passengers. He also performed the song on Sunrise on 22 June.

== Track listing ==
1. "Been a Long Time" – 3:05

== Chart performance ==
"Been a Long Time" debuted at number thirty-three on the ARIA Singles Chart on 27 June 2011.

Chart (2011)	Peak position
ARIA Singles Chart	33
