= The Way the World Looks =

The Way The World Looks

Studio album by Wes Carr
- Released: 20 March 2009
- Recorded: December 2008 – March 2009 at Sony Music Studios, Reily HQ, Mink Sound, Song Zu Studios, Electric Avenue, Sydney
- Genres: Rock, pop rock
- Label: Sony Music Entertainment
- Producers: T.Jay, Bryon Jones, Wes Carr

Wes Carr chronology
| Simple Sum (2008) | The Way The World Looks (2009) |

Singles from The Way The World Looks
- 1. "You" Released: 3 December 2008; 2. "Feels Like Woah" Released: 7 March 2009; 3. "Fearless" Released: 5 June 2009; 4. "Love Is An Animal" Released: 18 September 2009

The Way The World Looks is the second studio album by Australian singer and songwriter Wes Carr. The album was released on 20 March 2009 and contains Carr's Australian Idol winners single, "You" as well as the other released singles, "Feels Like Woah", "Fearless" and "Love Is An Animal".

== Background ==
The single, "Love Is An Animal" was written by Carr when he was only fifteen. He also wrote the single, "East Coast" and the title track "The Way the World Looks". Carr stated that, "This new album is definitely more upbeat and a positive outlook for me, and has flavors from all my past and present influences. I think there's a broader sensibility to my work now. The big difference now is that I'm more comfortable with my musicianship."

== Promotion ==
In December 2008, Carr, along with Jessica Mauboy, performed at Westfield stores. Carr performed the single "You" at the Sydney New Year's Eve concert in 2008. On 16 March 2009, Carr performed "Feels Like Woah" on So You Think You Can Dance. On 20 and 21 March, Carr performed in stores at Westfield Miranda, Sydney and Queen Street Mall, Brisbane. On 2 April 2009, Carr performed tracks from the album at the Sydney City Apple Store. In May 2009, Carr headlined his first national tour, "The Way The World Looks LIVE".

== Singles ==
- "You" was the first single released from the album. It was Carr's winners single for Australian Idol. In its third week on the Singles Chart, it managed to knock Poker Face by Lady Gaga from the #1 position, only for her to reclaim it the week after.
- "Feels Like Woah" was the second single released. Due to stores selling the single early, the song debuted at #52 on ARIA Singles Chart. It later peaked at #14.
- "Fearless" was released on 5 June 2009 It peaked at #51 on the ARIA Singles Chart
- "Love Is An Animal" was the fourth and final single taken from the album. It was released on 18 September 2009 and peaked at #64 on ARIA Singles Chart.

== Reception ==
Professional ratings
Review scores
| Source | Rating |
|---|---|
| Brisbane Times | link |
| Mix 94.5 | positive link |
| The Mercury | link |
| Oz Music Scene | Positive link |
| The Sydney Morning Herald | link |

The album met with positive reviews from critics. Christine Sams from The Sydney Morning Herald wrote that the album "Is an upbeat pop start to this album with Any Other Way and Carr's single, Feels Like Woah (with its touch of Bryan Adams) but it then veers into more gentle, playful territory with Hurricanes (delightful, with a distinct Jack Johnson feel). Further on, Light Years seems to come out of left field – dark and introspective. The mix keeps things interesting, with Carr emerging as a strong voice." She went on to give the album 8/10. Oz Music Scene stated that "Even the missteps are enjoyable to listen to. It’s just that when Wes gets it right, he sets the bar so high. This is a really solid debut, the kind that takes up permanent residence in your stereo and leaves you anticipating what comes next."

== Chart performance ==
Following the success of "You", the album entered the ARIA Albums Chart at #2. In its second week on the charts, it dropped to #4 and was certified Gold for sales in excess of 35,000 copies. The album peaked at #1 on the Australian Albums Chart (chart only for Australian origin), and at #2 on the Australian Physical Albums Chart.

== Track list ==
Standard Edition

All songs written by Wes Carr, T.Jay and Adam Argyle except where indicated

1. "Any Other Way" – 2:29
2. "Feels Like Woah" – 3:13
3. "Fearless" – 2:54
4. "When We Were Kings" – 3:26
5. "Hurricanes" – 3:07
6. "Love Is An Animal" – (Wes Carr) – 3:50
7. "Light Years" – 3:15
8. "East Coast" – (Wes Carr) – 3:46
9. "Stay Awake" – 3:06
10. "You" – (T.Jay, Adam Argyle) – 3:19
11. "The Way The World Looks" – (Wes Carr) – 3:25

2-disc Limited Edition

"Disc 1 – Standard Edition" "Disc 2 – YOU CD single"

1. "You" – 3:17
2. "Desire" – 2:52
3. "If I Were A Carpenter" – 2:23
4. "Get Back" – 2:44

== Charts ==
=== Weekly charts ===
| Chart (2009) | Peak position |
|---|---|
| Australian Albums (ARIA) | 2 |

=== Year-end charts ===
| Chart (2009) | Position |
|---|---|
| Australian (ARIA Charts) | 74 |

== Certifications ==
| Region | Certification | Certified units/sales |
|---|---|---|
| Australia (ARIA) | Gold | 35,000^{^} |
^{^} Shipments figures based on certification alone.

== Personnel ==
- T.Jay – electric guitar, B3 organ, synth, backing vocals, drum programming, tom-tom drum, guitar
- Mark Costa – bass guitar
- Mick Skelton – drums and percussion
- David Pritchard-Blunt – piano
- Andrew Bickers – saxophone
- Anthony Kable – trombone
- Stewart Kirwan – trumpet
- Mark Read – horn arrangement
- Wes Carr – vocals, backing vocals, piano, acoustic guitar, Wurlitzer, organ, keyboard
- Carmen Smith – backing vocals
- Carl Dimataga – electric guitar, acoustic guitar
- The MOB – backing vocals
- Adam Argyle – acoustic guitar
- Rex Goh – electric Guitar, slide guitar, acoustic guitar
- Martin Eden – programming
- Bryon Jones – bass guitar
- Stuart Roslyn – strings
- Nathan Cavaleri – guitar, bass guitar, programming
- Trent Williamson – harmonica
- Spencer Jones – backing vocals
- Simon Rudston-Brown – backing vocals
- Gerard Masters – backing vocals
- Daniel Clinch – Pro Tools
- Braddon Williams – engineer
- James Griffiths – engineer
- Ganesh Singaram – engineer
- Brian Paturalski – mixing
- Martin Pullan – mastering
- Angelo Kehagias – photography
- Debaser – artwork

== Release history ==
| Region | Date | Label | Format | Catalogue |
|---|---|---|---|---|
| Australia | 20 March 2009 | Sony BMG | CD, digital download | 88697471782 |
