= Lethbridge (band) =

Australian band

Lethbridge is an Australian R&B group from Brisbane, Queensland. It consists of the four Kereama brothers namely Levi Kereama, Jules Kereama, Ezra Kereama and Lane Kereama. The group formed in 1997 and earned a support slot for Boyz II Men on an Australian tour.

However, it was when Levi Kereama was a finalist on Australian Idol in 2003 that their career took off. The group's debut single, "In My Room", debuted in the ARIA Australian Top 40 singles charts in May 2004.

On 4 October 2008, Levi Kereama was found dead after falling from a Brisbane hotel building, where he had been staying after performing at the Parklife Festival earlier that day. It has been reported that he had depression, though denied by his family. Queensland Police treated the death as non-suspicious.

== Discography ==
=== Album ===
- Destiny (2004)

=== Singles ===
List of singles, with selected chart positions
Title	Year	Peak chart positions	Album
Title	Year	AUS	Album
"In My Room"	2004	12	Destiny
"Handcuffs Off" (Levi featuring Lethbridge)	2005	33	Destiny
