= Brielle Davis =

Australian recording artist

- Born: 1984 (age 41–42)
- Origin: Sydney, Australia
- Genre: Pop
- Years active: 1996–present
- Labels: ICAM; Rhythmic Muse; LGM/Sony
- Website: BrielleDavis.com

Brielle Davis (born 1984) is an Australian recording artist, known for her song "Serial Thriller" (2006) which reached the top 50 on the ARIA Singles chart.

== Biography ==
Davis grew up with her mother Anne in Sylvania, where she played netball and jazz dancing. Her first album, Brielle (1996 ICAM Records), was produced by Mark Bryan. She appeared in The Fame Game (1997), a documentary about the professional and personal costs of sudden and intense notoriety.

She recorded September's Sweet Child (Graeme Connors) in January of 1998, then by mid-1998, she released Brielle via LGM/Columbia and distributed by Sony Music Australia. Entertainment magazine, Billboard's Christie Eliezer and Glenn A. Baker noted Davis as an "artist to watch." Rosie's Reviews observed, "instrumentation on this 12 track album is faultless, as are the vocals... however I will be far more interested in what she does in several years time."

Davis was nominated for New Talent of the Year at the 1999 Country Music Awards of Australia, making her the youngest nominee ever for the Golden Guitar Award. She was the first performer to sing the Australian National Anthem at Stadium Australia. Davis was an NSW semi-finalist in the 1999 and 2000 Young Australian of the Year Awards and was a semi-finalist on Australian Idol singing "Even God Must Get The Blues".

Davis returned in 2006 with her first studio release since 1998's "Girl's in Love". "Serial Thriller" (co-written by Divinyls' front woman Chrissy Amphlett) debuted on the ARIA chart at No. 44. The song had an electro-rock beat, contrasting Davis' older material.

The follow-up single "Take It Off" was released in March 2007 and peaked at #11 on the ARIA Club Chart after remix treatment by US house producer Andy Caldwell. It also gained national airplay as part of the Nova network's Unsigned initiative and in radio ads for the Leukemia Foundation's World's Greatest Shave campaign. A second album, The Other Side, was proposed in May 2007 but was not released. In the following month, Davis toured Solomon Islands, supporting Jet, to entertain Australian troops stationed there for Operation Anode. An extended play, Crossing the Line, was released later in 2007. It featured acoustic versions of "Serial Thriller", "Oxygen", The Other Side's unreleased tracks "Cybersexual" and "Mine". plus new tracks, "Crossing the Line", "Bang Bang".

In early 2008, Davis was one of a group of entertainers who toured and performed for Australian troops in Iraq and Afghanistan. The tour was covered on Australian Story on ABC1 as a two-part documentary. In July-September 2009, she took the role of Elaine Harper in the play Arsenic and Old Lace at Cronulla's Arts Theatre.

Davis joined alternative country act The Delivery in 2010 on lead vocals and guitar. They released an EP (Thinkin' About Giving Up On You) and a single (Why Can't I Remember Your Name). In 2012, Davis formed Not Good with Horses with several members of The Delivery. The group issued its debut album, Faultlines, on 29 March 2018.

== Discography ==
=== Albums ===
List of albums, with selected details
Title	Details
Brielle	Released: 1998; Format: CD; Label: LGM P/L (4895732)

=== Extended plays ===
List of EPs, with selected details
Title	Details
Crossing the Line	Released: 2007; Format: CD

=== Singles ===
List of singles, with selected chart positions
Title	Year	Peak chart positions
Title	Year	AUS
"September's Sweet Child"	1998	—
"Girl's in Love"	1998	—
"Serial Thriller"	2006	44
"Take It Off"	2007	—
