= You (Wes Carr song) =

Single by Wes Carr

from the album The Way the World Looks
- Released: 23 November 2008 (Digital); 3 December 2008 (CD)
- Recorded: 2008
- Genre: Pop rock, country
- Length: 3:17
- Label: Sony BMG
- Songwriters: Adam Argyle; T. Jay

Wes Carr singles chronology
"You" (2008)	"Feels Like Woah" (2009)

"You" is the debut single from the 2008 Australian Idol winner, Wes Carr. It was released digitally on 23 November 2008, and physically on 3 December 2008. It is the lead single from his second studio album, The Way the World Looks.

== Track listing ==
CD single

1. "You"
2. "Get Back"
3. "Desire"
4. "If I Were A Carpenter"

== Charts and certifications ==
The song debuted at #3 on the ARIA Singles Chart, before climbing to #2, then peaking at #1, in its third week, and certified Gold. It then fell to #2 for two weeks, and then spent its final week inside the top ten at #8.

Chart (2008)	Peak position
ARIA Singles Chart	1
ARIA Physical Singles Chart	1
ARIA Aussie Singles	1
ARIA Digital Tracks	2
Australian Airplay Chart	5

=== Year-end charts ===
Country	Chart	Ranking
Australia	ARIA End of Year Singles	43
Australia	ARIA End of Year Physical Singles	6
Australia	ARIA End of Year Digital Tracks	59

=== Certification ===
Country	Certification	Sales
Australia	Gold	35,000+
