= What's Wrong with This Picture? (Lee Harding album) =

Studio album by Lee Harding
- Released: 20 February 2006
- Recorded: December 2005–January 2006
- Genre: Pop-punk, rock
- Length: 32:15
- Label: Sony BMG Australia

Singles from What's Wrong with This Picture?
- 1. "Wasabi / Eye of the Tiger" Released: 12 December 2005; 2. "Anything for You" Released: 20 March 2006; 3. "Call the Nurse" Released: 2006

What's Wrong with This Picture? is the debut studio album by the Australian Idol third season third-place finisher, Lee Harding.The album was released in February 2006 and peaked at number 3 on the ARIA Charts.

== Track listing ==
1. "Wasabi" – 3:00
2. "Let's Not Go to Work" – 2:59
3. "Anything for You" – 3:02
4. "Just Another Love Song" – 4:01
5. "L Is for Loser" – 3:30
6. "Call the Nurse" – 3:43
7. "You Could Have Anyone" – 2:35
8. "Change the World" – 3:41
9. "Try Tonight" – 2:55
10. "Eye of the Tiger" – 2:45

Enhanced CD

1. "Wasabi" (Video)
2. Inside Wasabi (Behind the Scenes of the Video)
3. Inside Anything for You (Behind the Scenes of the Video)

== Charts ==
=== Weekly charts ===
Chart (2006)	Peak position
Australian Albums (ARIA)	3

=== Year-end charts ===
Chart (2006)	Rank
Australian Artist Albums Chart	35

== Certifications ==
Region	Certification	Certified units/sales
Australia (ARIA)	Gold	35,000^{^}
^{^} Shipments figures based on certification alone.

== Release history ==
Region	Date	Format	Edition(s)	Label	Catalogue
Australia	20 February 2006	CD; digital download	Standard	Sony BMG	828767873022
Australia	20 February 2006	CD; digital download	Enhanced CD	Sony BMG	828768074522
