= Wasabi (Lee Harding song) =

2005 single by Lee Harding

Single by Lee Harding

from the album What's Wrong with This Picture?
- A-side: "Eye of the Tiger"
- Released: 12 December 2005
- Recorded: 2005
- Length: 5:43
- Label: Sony BMG
- Songwriters: Adrian Hannan; Barbara Hannan; Emma Graham; Tommy Rando
- Producer: Adrian Hannan

Lee Harding singles chronology
"Wasabi" / "Eye of the Tiger" (2005)	"Anything for You" (2006)

"Wasabi" is a song written by Adrian Hannan, Barbara Hannan, Emma Graham and Tommy Rando, produced by Adrian Hannan for Australian singer Lee Harding's debut album, What's Wrong with This Picture? (2006). Harding was a contestant on season three of Australian Idol (July–November 2005).

Harding's debut single, "Wasabi" was issued on 12 December 2005 as a double A-side with his cover version of Survivor's "Eye of the Tiger". It peaked at No. 1 on the Australian ARIA Singles Chart for five consecutive weeks. In 2009, a Herald Sun poll ranked "Wasabi" as the seventh-worst Australian song of all time.

== Charts ==
=== Weekly charts ===
Chart (2005–2006)	Peak position
Australia (ARIA)	1

=== Year-end charts ===
Chart (2006)	Position
Australia (ARIA)	8
Australian Artists (ARIA)	4

== Certification ==
Region	Certification	Certified units/sales
Australia (ARIA)	Platinum	70,000^{^}
^{^} Shipments figures based on certification alone.

== See also ==
- Australian Idol
- Music of Australia
- List of number-one singles of 2005 (Australia)
- List of number-one singles of 2006 (Australia)
