= Fearless (Wes Carr song) =

Single by Wes Carr

from the album The Way the World Looks
- B-side: "My Home Town"
- Released: 12 June 2009
- Recorded: 2009
- Genre: Pop rock
- Label: Sony BMG
- Songwriter(s): Wes Carr, T Jay, Adam Argyle
- Producer(s): T.Jay

Wes Carr singles chronology
"Feels Like Woah" (2009)	"Fearless" (2009)	"Love Is An Animal" (2009)

Alternative cover
- Promotional Poster

"Fearless" is the 3rd single to be released from Australian singer, Wes Carr's second studio album, The Way the World Looks. It was released on 12 June 2009.

== Promotion ==
The song gained some buzz, based on the fact actors from hit Australian T.V series Underbelly are featured in the clip. Promotional posters were also released.

== Track listing ==
Australian CD Single

1. Fearless
2. My Home Town

== Charts ==
The song was the number-one most added track to Australian radio in its first week of release.

Chart (2009)	Peak position
Australian ARIA Singles Chart	51
ARIA Physical Singles Chart	28
ARIA Australian Singles	8
Australian Airplay Chart	24
