= Love Is an Animal =

Single by Wes Carr

from the album The Way the World Looks
- Released: 18 September 2009
- Genre: Pop rock
- Length: 3:50 (radio mix)
- Label: Sony BMG
- Songwriter: Wes Carr
- Producer: T.Jay

Wes Carr singles chronology
| "Fearless" (2009) | "Love Is an Animal" (2009) | "Been a Long Time" (2011) |

"Love Is an Animal" is the fourth single from Australian singer-songwriter Wes Carr's second studio album, The Way the World Looks. It was sent to radio on 27 August 2009, and released physically on 18 September 2009.

== Charts ==
The song was the second most-added track to the radio in its debut week of release

| Chart (2009) | Peak position |
|---|---|
| Australia (ARIA) | 61 |
