= Wes Carr =

Australian singer-songwriter and multi-instrumentalist

Wesley Dean
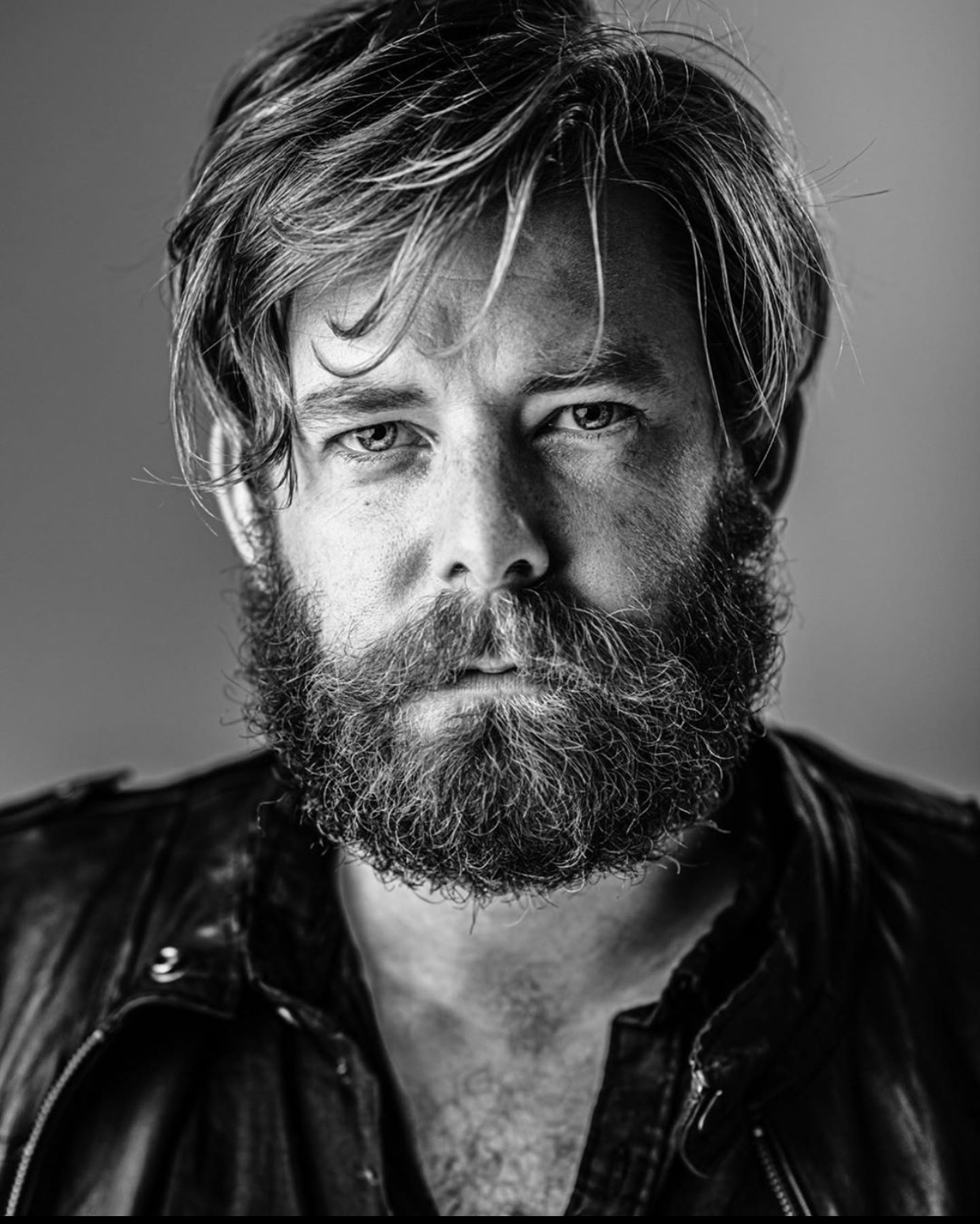
- Carr in 2019

Background information
- Also known as: Wes Carr; Buffalo Tales
- Born: Wesley Dean Carr; 14 September 1982 (age 44); Gawler, South Australia, Australia
- Origin: Nashville, Tennessee, United States
- Genres: Americana, country, rock, folk rock
- Occupations: Singer-songwriter, multi-instrumentalist
- Instruments: Vocals, guitar, harmonica, keyboard, percussion
- Years active: 2003–present
- Labels: Sony Music Australia (2008–2011); Independent (2011–present)
- Website: wescarr.com.au, https://wesleydean.komi.io/

Wesley Dean Carr (born 14 September 1982), known professionally as Wesley Dean and formerly as Wes Carr, is an Australian singer-songwriter and multi-instrumentalist. He won the sixth season of Australian Idol in 2008, subsequently releasing the singles "You", "Feels Like Woah", "Fearless" and "Love Is an Animal", and the studio albums The Way the World Looks (2009), Roadtrip Confessions (2013) and Australiana (2018). He has also recorded under the name Buffalo Tales.

In 2021, Carr relocated from Australia to Nashville, Tennessee, and began recording and performing under his middle name, Wesley Dean. His first album under the name was unknown, released in 2022. His subsequent album, Music From Crazy Hearts, was released in 2024 and was recorded at Nashville's RCA Studio A. The album accompanied the feature documentary project Crazy Hearts: The Documentary, which chronicles Dean and his family travelling more than 5,000 miles by road from Nashville to Los Angeles while performing at locations across the United States.

== Early life ==
Wes Carr was born and raised in Gawler, South Australia, a town near the Barossa Valley on Adelaide's northern fringe. Carr took classes five nights a week at the Johnny Young Talent School, but eventually left Adelaide to live with his father in Sydney at the age of fifteen. From here on, Carr began his DIY education of the music industry, swapping time at school for time at bars, performing and meeting other musicians. His first big gig was supporting Australian band Leonardo's Bride for their last gig at The Basement Carr also played gigs with Missy Higgins, Lior, Paul Mac, Andrew Farriss of INXS and Don Walker of Cold Chisel.

On 3 November 2003, Carr released his debut EP Rhythm to Fly, independently. After Australian band Silverchair went into hiatus in 2003, Carr and Ben Gillies formed the band, Tambalane. Carr and Gilles parted ways in 2005 when an "unpleasant power struggle" emerged between the two. In 2006, Carr worked with C. J. Vanston in Los Angeles, where they co-wrote the song "Say My Name" for the film, For Your Consideration. On 11 June 2008, Carr released his debut studio album, Simple Sum, independently.

== Australian Idol ==
In 2008, Carr auditioned for the sixth season of Australian Idol. In the top five round, Carr sang Michael Jackson's "Black or White" and received two touchdowns, including one from judge Marcia Hines and guest judge Jermaine Jackson. He also received another touchdown in the top three round, from judge Ian Dickson and a TV throw from judge Kyle Sandilands also he has never being in the bottom 2 or bottom 3 appearance. On 23 November 2008, Carr was announced the winner of Australian Idol of 2008 with Luke Dickens becoming the runner-up. He also became the first male winner to be born in Australia. As winner, Carr received a recording contract with Sony Music Australia, a car and $200,000 towards developing his craft.

Week	Theme	Song sung	Artist	Result
Top 24	N/A	"Times Like These"	Foo Fighters	Advanced
Top 12	Contestant's idols	"Beautiful Day"	U2	Safe
Top 11	1980s	"Dancing in the Dark"	Bruce Springsteen	Safe
Top 10	Australian songs	"Friday on My Mind"	The Easybeats	Safe
Top 9	ABBA	"Fernando"	ABBA	Safe
Top 8	Rock n' Roll smash hits	"Desire"	U2	Safe
Top 7	Motown	"If I Were a Carpenter"	The 4 Tops	Safe
Top 6	The Rolling Stones	"Jumpin' Jack Flash"	The Rolling Stones	Safe
Top 5	Michael Jackson; The Jackson 5	"Black or White"	Michael Jackson	Safe
Top 4	American songs	"When You Were Young" "What a Wonderful World"	The Killers; Louis Armstrong	Bottom 2
Top 3	Contestant's choice	"Easy" "Get Back"	Faith No More; The Beatles	Safe
Top 2	Contestant's choice Contestant's winners single	"White Noise" "You"	The Living End; Wes Carr	Winner
Grand Finale	Finalists' duet Contestant's favourite Contestant's winners single	"Times Like These" "Black or White" "You"	Foo Fighters; Michael Jackson; Wes Carr	Winner

== Recording career ==
=== 2008–09: The Way the World Looks ===
After coming out of Australian Idol as the winner, Carr signed to Sony Music Australia. His winner's and debut single, "You" was released immediately for download following his win on 23 November 2008. The song peaked at number one on the ARIA Singles Chart and was certified Gold by the Australian Recording Industry Association (ARIA), for shipments of 35,000 units. Carr's second studio album, The Way the World Looks, was released on 20 March 2009. It debuted at number two on the ARIA Albums Chart and also certified Gold. "Feels Like Woah" was released as the album's second single on 13 February 2009. The song peaked at number fourteen and certified Gold. "Fearless" and "Love Is an Animal" were released as the album's third and fourth singles, respectively.

In May 2009, Carr embarked on a national tour to perform songs from the album. The national tour, "The Way the World Looks LIVE", began on 27 May and ended on 12 July. In September 2009, Carr served as a support act for Irish band The Script's Australian tour. In October, Carr toured with Ian Moss on his national "Shake It Up Tour". The tour began on 8 October and ended on 19 December. At the 2009 ARIA Music Awards, "You" was nominated for "Highest Selling Single", but lost to Jessica Mauboy's "Running Back".

=== 2011–present: Buffalo Tales and Roadtrip Confessions ===
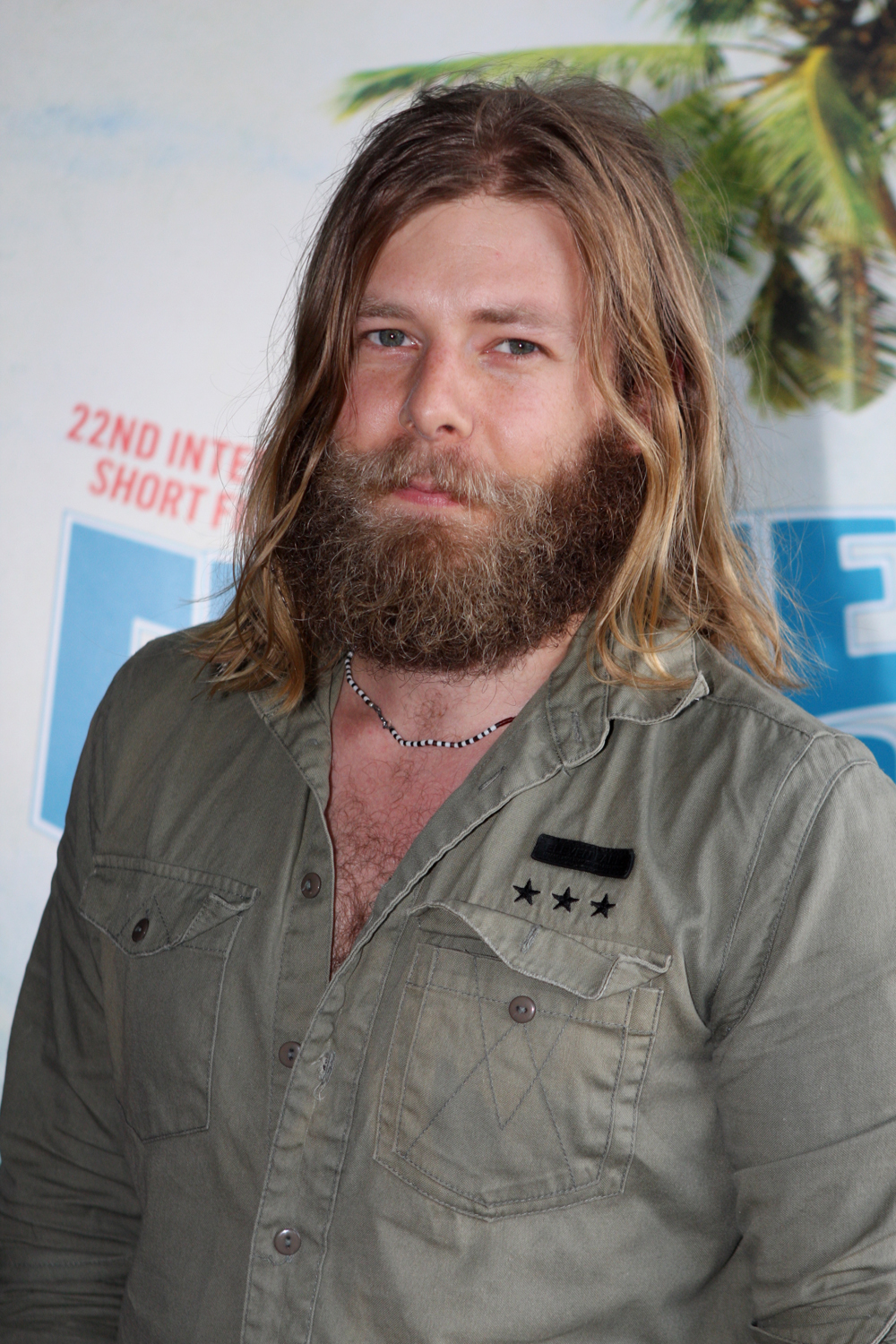
Carr in 2012

Carr's third studio album was scheduled to be released in 2012. In an interview with Adelaide Now, Carr said he wrote the album on his travels to Los Angeles, Nashville, London and Paris, and is full of "personal, candid stories." Its lead single "Been a Long Time" was released for digital download on 10 June 2011. The single peaked at number 33 on the ARIA Singles Chart. In November 2011, Carr announced on that he was no longer with Sony and would release his album independently.

In August 2012, Carr released an EP titled Blood & Bone under the pseudonym Buffalo. This was later changed to Buffalo Tales, given a multitude of artists using the Buffalo moniker. In April 2013, Carr uploaded a cover of Diamonds by Rihanna. The cover was praised on Twitter by Sia, one of the song's co-writers. In May 2013, Carr released "Amsterdam" the lead single from his third studio album – and debut as Buffalo Tales – entitled Roadtrip Confessions. A video for "Amsterdam" was released on 5 June 2013. The single did not chart. Roadtrip Confessions was released on 21 June 2013 and debuted at number 83 on the ARIA Album Chart. The next single was "Puppet Strings".

In November 2016, Carr featured in the Catherine Britt single, "F U Cancer" alongside Kasey Chambers, Beccy Cole, Lyn Bowtell, Josh Pyke and Wendy Matthews.

=== 2018–2020: Australiana ===
In December, Carr self-released a new studio album titled Australiana. The album is a covers album of songs performed by Australian artists.

=== 2021–present: Wesley Dean and Nashville ===
In 2021, Carr relocated with his family from Australia to Nashville, Tennessee, during the COVID-19 pandemic. Following the move, he began recording and performing under the name Wesley Dean, using his middle name professionally. Dean described the change as the beginning of a new phase of his career, separate from his previous success as Wes Carr in Australia.

Dean released the album unknown in 2022. The album marked his first full-length release under the Wesley Dean name and followed his move to Nashville.

==== Music From Crazy Hearts ====
Dean released his studio album Music From Crazy Hearts on 26 April 2024. The album was recorded at Nashville's historic RCA Studio A and incorporates elements of country, Americana, rock and gospel. It was his second full-length release under the Wesley Dean name.

The album was developed alongside Crazy Hearts: The Documentary, a feature-length documentary following Dean and his family during a road trip of more than 5,000 miles from Nashville to Los Angeles. The journey included performances and stops in locations including Memphis, New Orleans, Luckenbach, Marfa and Las Vegas, and was filmed by a director and cameraperson travelling with the family.

The album produced several singles and accompanying music videos, including "Burn This House", "Don't Look Back" featuring Sarah Buxton, "Gunslinger", "Blood Brothers" and "Mercy".

In October 2024, Dean released the music video for "Crazy Hearts", produced in collaboration with Nashville Ballet. The video was choreographed by Nashville Ballet artistic director Nick Mullikin and featured dancers James Lankford and Lily Saito.

Crazy Hearts: The Documentary was initially announced for release in 2025. By March 2025, the documentary was reported as being planned for release in 2026.

== Personal life ==
In February 2011, Carr announced in the Australian OK! magazine, that he was engaged to actress Charlotte Gregg. Wes married Charlotte in April 2012, and their first child was born later that year.

== Discography ==
=== Studio albums ===
Album	Year	Name
Simple Sum	2008	Wes Carr
The Way the World Looks	2009	Wes Carr
Roadtrip Confessions	2013	Wes Carr
Australiana	2018	Wes Carr
unknown	2022	Wesley Dean
Music From Crazy Hearts	2024	Wes Wesley Dean

=== Extended plays ===
Title	EP details
Rhythm to Fly	Released: 3 November 2003; Label: Independent; Format: Digital download
Blood & Bone	Released: 13 August 2012; Label: Foyle; Format: Digital download

=== Singles ===
==== As lead artist ====
Year	Title	Peak chart positions	Certifications	Album
Year	Title	AUS	Certifications	Album
2008	"You"	1	ARIA: Gold	The Way the World Looks
2009	"Feels Like Woah"	14	ARIA: Gold	The Way the World Looks
2009	"Fearless"	51		The Way the World Looks
2009	"Love Is an Animal"	61		The Way the World Looks
2011	"Been a Long Time"	33		Non-album single
2013	"Amsterdam"	—		Roadtrip Confessions
2014	"Anthem"	—		Non-album singles
2015	"People of Peace"	—		Non-album singles
2016	"Home"	—		Non-album singles

==== As featured artist ====
Year	Title
2016	"F U Cancer" (Catherine Britt featuring Carr, Kasey Chambers, Beccy Cole, Lyn Bowtell, Josh Pyke and Wendy Matthews)

=== Music videos ===
Year	Song	Director
2008	"You"	Unknown
2009	"Feels Like Woah"	Unknown
2009	"Fearless"	Unknown
2009	"Love Is an Animal"	Unknown
2011	"Been a Long Time"	Unknown
2014	"Anthem"	Unknown

== Awards and nominations ==
=== APRA Awards ===
The APRA Awards are presented annually from 1982 by the Australasian Performing Right Association (APRA), "honouring composers and songwriters". They commenced in 1982.

Year	Nominee / work	Award	Result	Ref.
2016	"Lost" by Cold Chisel (Don Walker & Wes Carr)	Song of the Year	Shortlisted	

=== ARIA Music Awards ===
The ARIA Music Awards is an annual awards ceremony that recognises excellence, innovation, and achievement across all genres of Australian music.

Year	Nominee / work	Award	Result
2009	"You"	Highest Selling Single	Nominated

=== Country Music Awards of Australia ===
The Country Music Awards of Australia (CMAA) (also known as the Golden Guitar Awards) is an annual awards night held in January during the Tamworth Country Music Festival, celebrating recording excellence in the Australian country music industry. They have been held annually since 1973.

Year	Nominee / work	Award	Result
2017	"F U Cancer" (with Catherine Britt)	Vocal Collaboration of the Year	Won

Preceded by Natalie Gauci	Australian Idol; Winner; Season 6 (2008)	Succeeded by Stan Walker
