= Serial Thriller =

- CD single

Song by Brielle Davis
- Released: April 2006
- Recorded: Early 2006
- Studio: Studio Twelve, Sydney
- Genre: Pop rock
- Length: 3:31
- Label: Rhythmic Muse/Rajon
- Songwriter(s): Christina Amphlett; Clive Young
- Producer(s): Clive Young

Brielle Davis singles chronology
"Girl's in Love" (1998)	"Serial Thriller" (2006)	"Take It Off" (2006)

"Serial Thriller" is a song co-written by Christina Amphlett and its record producer, Clive Young. It is performed by Australian singer Brielle Davis and is her first charting CD single, debuting on the ARIA Singles Chart in May 2006 at number forty-four, peaking at number sixteen on the ARIA Australasian Artists Singles chart and at number twenty-one (for the mrTimothy Vocal mix) on the ARIA Club Tracks chart. The song has a rock, beat influence which was a contrast to her older material. Aside from "Serial Thriller", Davis had worked with Amphlett (from the Divinyls) on her recent recordings. This release features remixes from mrTimothy, Moneyshott, Jimmy Z & Sam Gee, and Wayne G & Porl Young.

== Formats and track listings ==
"Serial Thriller" was released in April 2006 in Australia and appeared as a CD single on 13 May 2006. "Serial Thriller" was co-written by Chrissy Amphlett and Clive Young. "Oxygen" was co-written by Brielle Davis, E Sherlock and Sven Tydeman.

Australian CD single

1. "Serial Thriller" (radio edit)
2. "Oxygen" (DNA alternate mix)
3. "Serial Thriller" (mrTimothy remix)
4. "Serial Thriller" (JimmyZ & Sam Gee's Filthy 4Play mix)
5. "Serial Thriller" (Wayne G & Porl Young electrophunx mix)
6. "Serial Thriller" (3am Moneyshott mix)

== Charts ==
Chart (2006)	Peak position
Australia (ARIA Charts)	44
