= Simple Sum =

Studio album by Wes Carr
- Released: 11 June 2008
- Recorded: Electric Avenue Studios, Sydney, Australia in 2007
- Genres: Roots, folk
- Length: 59:25
- Label: Indie
- Producer: Wes Carr

Wes Carr chronology
| Simple Sum (2008) | The Way the World Looks (2009) |

Simple Sum is the first studio album by Australian singer-songwriter, Wes Carr. Carr recorded the album in 2007 at Sydney's Electric Avenue Studios. The album was released independently and features tracks that were written by Carr, including many at the age of fourteen and fifteen. The album was released digitally on 11 June 2008.

== Track listing ==
All tracks are written by Wes Carr.

| No. | Title | Length |
|---|---|---|
| 1. | "Simple Sum" | 3:40 |
| 2. | "Soul All Stuck to My Face" | 3:59 |
| 3. | "Elsie Brown" | 4:37 |
| 4. | "Angel" | 4:17 |
| 5. | "New Day" | 2:25 |
| 6. | "Streetlight Is the Moon" | 3:50 |
| 7. | "Cure" | 4:26 |
| 8. | "Train to Yesterday" | 3:54 |
| 9. | "Cherrokee Dream" | 4:08 |
| 10. | "Mumble Words of Love" | 3:55 |
| 11. | "Tricks to Magik" | 3:56 |
| 12. | "Princess" | 3:15 |
| 13. | "Mind Field" | 4:25 |
| 14. | "Jimmy K" | 4:10 |
| 15. | "White Rabbit Day" | 5:25 |
| Total length: | | 59:25 |

== Background ==
"Cherrokee Dream" was written about the nightmares Carr used to suffer as a child. In fact, his song choice for Australian Idol's top 4 American Hits night, "What A Wonderful World", was inspired by this very fact. Carr listened to the song as a child frequently, and on repeat, to help him sleep.

The song "Elsie Brown (Simple Sum)" was written by Carr in 2003, inspired by a news story he read about a lady of that name, who died alone in her Sydney home and was speculated to have been left undiscovered for up to 22 months. She was elderly and neighbours claimed she rarely left her house or had visitors.
