= Feels Like Woah =

Single by Wes Carr

from the album The Way the World Looks
- B-side: "Gone For Good (Acoustic)"
- Released: 7 March 2009
- Recorded: 2008
- Length: 3:15
- Label: Sony BMG
- Songwriter(s): Wes Carr, T Jay, Adam Argyle
- Producer(s): T.Jay

Wes Carr singles chronology
"You" (2008)	"'Feels Like Woah'" (2009)	"Fearless" (2009)

"Feels Like Woah" is the second single from Australian singer and songwriter Wes Carr's second studio album, The Way the World Looks. It was released on 7 March 2009 and has been used as the theme song for the 2009 NRL season.

== Track listing ==
All tracks are written by Wes Carr, T Jay, Adam Argyle

iTunes single
No.	Title	Length
1.	"Feels Like Woah"	3:15

CD single
No.	Title	Length
1.	"Feels Like Woah"	3:15
2.	"Gone for Good (Acoustic Version)"	3:08

iTunes EP
No.	Title	Length
1.	"Feels Like Woah"	3:15
2.	"Gone for Good (Acoustic Version)"	3:08
3.	"Feels Like Woah (NRL Version)"	3:04

== Music video ==
A music video was created and released for the song. It was filmed in Sydney's inner-west suburbs. On March 4, 2009 the music video was released when uploaded to Carr's official YouTube channel.

== Chart performance ==
"Feels Like Woah" debuted at #46 on the ARIA Top Singles chart because some record stores sold the single a week early. Feels Like Woah reached a peak of #14.

== Charts ==
Chart (2009)	Peak position
Australian ARIA Singles Chart	14
ARIA Digital Tracks	14
ARIA Physical Singles	7
ARIA Australian Singles	2
Australian Airplay Chart	1

=== Year-end charts ===
Year	Chart	Rank
2009	Australian ARIA End-of-Year Chart	94

=== Certifications ===
Country	Certification	Sales
Australia	Gold	35,000+
