= Lee Harding =

- Born: 8 June 1983 (age 43); Frankston, Victoria, Australia
- Genre: Pop-punk
- Years active: 2005–2007, 2019
- Labels: Sony BMG (2005–2006); Sound Vault (2006)

Lee Harding (born 8 June 1983) is an Australian singer from Frankston, Victoria. He is best known for placing third in the third season of Australian Idol in 2005.

== Career ==
=== Bedrock ===
Prior to competing in Australian Idol, Harding was a member of a cover band named "Bedrock" who described themselves as a "party band", with a repertoire of hits from the 1960s to the present day. Harding was quoted on his website as saying, "I'd been going to see them since I was 16. I saw them every single week so I knew every song when I joined Bedrock".

=== 2005–2007: Australian Idol and What's Wrong with This Picture? ===
In 2005, Harding auditioned for the third season of Australian Idol, ultimately placing third. Harding's performances on Australian Idol include:

Australian Idol performances and results (2005)
Episode	Song	Result
Audition	"Better"	Through to the Theatre Rounds
Theatre Rounds	"Hard to Handle", "Just The Way You Are", "Footloose"	Through to top 30
Top 30	"The Anthem"	Through to live shows
Live show 1: Australian Made (Top 13)	"Holy Grail"	Saved by Public
Live show 2: 60s Hits (Top 11)	"I'm a Believer"	Saved by Public
Live show 3: Supergroups (Top 10)	"Roxanne"	Saved by Public
Live show 4: Idols' Choice (Top 9)	"Holiday"	Saved by Public
Live show 5: Big Band (Top 8)	"Straighten Up and Fly Right"	Saved by Public
Live show 6: 80s Hits (Top 7)	"Eye of the Tiger"	Saved by Public
Up Close & Personal (Top 6)	"Plush"	non-elimination episode
Live show 7: Motown Hits (Top 6)	"Ben"	Saved by Public
Live show 8: 70s Hits (Top 5)	"My Sharona"	Bottom 2 – Saved by Public
Live show 9: Elvis (Top 4)	"Teddy Bear"	Saved by Public
Live show 9: Elvis (Top 4)	"Jailhouse Rock"	Saved by Public
Live show 10: No. 1 Hits (Top 3)	"Faith"	Eliminated in 3rd position
Live show 10: No. 1 Hits (Top 3)	"Tainted Love"	Eliminated in 3rd position

Immediately following the show, Harding was signed to Sony BMG and released his debut single "Wasabi"/"Eye of the Tiger" in December 2005. The song debuted at number one on the ARIA Charts and was the eighth highest single in 2006.

Harding's debut album What's Wrong with This Picture? was released in February 2006 and peaked at number 3 on the ARIA albums charts. Two further singles followed; "Anything for You" and "Call the Nurse". In July 2007, Harding's contract ceased with Sony BMG, with the record label claiming they had "their line up of priority artists for the year, and he was not one of them."

=== 2007–2018: Projects ===
Since 2007, Harding has been involved in a number of short-lived projects, including the group Rock City 2, who released an album in October 2007. and the Patience Project who released a single titled "Lipstick Cabaret" in June 2011. Harding also plays in cover bands at Crown Casino in Melbourne.

=== 2019: The Voice ===
In 2019 Harding auditioned for the eighth season of The Voice Australia where he joined team Boy George. He was eliminated in the top 9.

The Voice performances and results (2019)
Episode	Song	Original Artist	Result
Audition	"Killing in the Name"	Rage Against the Machine	Through to The Knockouts
The Knockouts	"We Will Rock You"	Queen	Through to Battle Rounds
Battle Rounds	"Leave a Light On"	Tom Walker	Through to live shows
Live show 1	"Uprising"	Muse	Saved by Coach
Live show 2	"The Beautiful People"	Marilyn Manson	Saved by Public
Semi Final	"Walk This Way"	Aerosmith	Eliminated

== Discography ==
=== Albums ===
List of studio albums, with selected chart positions and certifications
Title	Album details	Peak chart positions	Certifications
Title	Album details	AUS	Certifications
What's Wrong with This Picture?	Released: 20 February 2006; Label: Sony BMG Australia; Format: CD, digital download	3	ARIA: Gold

=== Singles ===
List of singles, with selected chart positions
Title	Year	Peak chart positions	Certifications	Album
Title	Year	AUS	Certifications	Album
"Wasabi"/"Eye of the Tiger"	2005	1	ARIA: Platinum	What's Wrong with This Picture?
"Anything for You"	2005	23		What's Wrong with This Picture?
"Call the Nurse"	2005	—		What's Wrong with This Picture?

== Concerts/Tours ==
=== Shannon Noll support act ===
Lee was support for fellow Idol contestant Shannon Noll on his nationwide tour with mate and fellow Idol contestant Dan England. Harding played venues such as Luna Park Sydney's Big Top.

=== INXS support act ===
August 2006, Harding was opening act for rock group INXS with bandmates Bedrock for one night of their tour in Brisbane.

=== Anything for You Tour ===
In April 2006, Harding headlined his own tour titled the Anything for You Tour. Before acts included the Sydney-based power-pop group Kid Courageous, rapper Figgkidd, and the indie rock group Town Hall Steps. Harding performed at such venues including Penrith Panthers and Castle Hill RSL Club. The tour covered venues along the east coast of Australia.

=== All Age Rampage/Pop Punk Tour 2006 ===
In September 2006, Harding began his co-headlining tour with Kid Courageous of small venues across the nation. The tour commenced in Brisbane, then continued to the Gold Coast, Melbourne, Albury and Adelaide. Artists on the tour included Lee Harding and Bedrock, Kid Courageous, 919 (later known as Amber Calling) and Enolas Secret (formerly known as Wishlist). Melbourne band Don't Ask Us supported the tour on the Victorian dates. Due to the arisal of a family issue, the tour was postponed for the NSW shows, which consisted of venues such as Penrith Leagues, the Manning Bar and Dapto Leagues. News was received after the conclusion of the Adelaide show and was confirmed in an official press release by Harding's manager at the time.

=== Bass in the Grass ===
Lee attended Bass in the Grass in Darwin in 2006. While on stage he was "hit by a barrage of full water bottles hurled at him from all sides".
