= Deadly Awards 2005 =

Australian Aboriginal and Torres Strait Islander annual music awards

The Deadly Awards was an annual celebration of Australian Aboriginal and Torres Strait Islander achievement in music, sport, entertainment and community.

== Music ==
- Most Promising New Talent: Lez Beckett
- Single Release of the Year: Casey Donovan – Listen with Your Heart
- Album Release of the Year: Fitzroy Xpress – Home Sweet Home
- Band of the Year: Local Knowledge
- Artist of the Year: Casey Donovan
- Jimmy Little Award for Lifetime Achievement in Aboriginal and Torres Strait Islander Music: Kev Carmody
- Excellence in Film or Theatrical Score: Mary G & The G Spot Band – The Mary G Show

== Sport ==
- Most Promising New Talent: Brenton Bowen
- Outstanding Achievement in AFL: Michael O'Loughlin
- Outstanding Achievement In rugby league: Matt Bowen
- Female Sportsperson of the Year: Stacey Porter
- Male Sportsperson of the Year: Matt Bowen
- The Ella Award For Lifetime Achievement in Aboriginal and Torres Strait Islander Sport: Lionel Rose

== The arts ==
- Dancer of the Year: Rayma Johnson
- Outstanding Achievement in Film and Television: Wayne Blair, Director – The Djarn Djarns
- Outstanding Achievement in Literature: Stephen Hagan – The N Word: One Man's Stand (ISBN 978-1875641987)
- Actor of the Year: Leah Purcell – Stuff Happens
- Visual Artists of the Year: Gordon Hooke
- Special Presentation Lifetime Achievement Award: Justine Saunders Oa

== Community ==
- DEST Award For Outstanding Achievement in Aboriginal and Torres Strait Islander Education: Peter Buckskin
- Outstanding Achievement in Aboriginal and Torres Strait Islander Health: Sandra Eades
- Broadcaster of the Year: Rhoda Roberts – Deadly Sounds And Awaye!, Australian Broadcasting Commission Radio
- New Apprentice of the Year: Andrew Craig
