= Lonely (Casey Donovan song) =

Single by Casey Donovan

from the album Off the Grid & Somewhere in Between
- Released: 19 May 2017
- Genre: Pop
- Label: Casey Donovan

Casey Donovan singles chronology
"Last Regret" (2010)	"Lonely" (2017)	"The Villain" (2017)

"Lonely" is a song by Australian singer and actress Casey Donovan (singer). It is her first original single in seven years and was released independently on 19 May 2017 as the lead single from her EP Off the Grid & Somewhere in Between. The track is a heartfelt pop ballad written by Donovan and producer Daniel Skeed (also known as Dan Skeed). It draws from Donovan's personal experiences of heartbreak and loneliness, with lyrics expressing the pain of unrequited love and the decision to walk away.

Donovan performed "Lonely" on The Morning Show on 18 May 2017 and on 3AW on 19 May 2017 with Denis Walter.

== Background and release ==
In 2016, Donovan played Killer Queen in the Australian production of We Will Rock You. Between January and March 2017, Donovan was a contestant on the third season of I'm a Celebrity...Get Me Out of Here!, which she later won. On 23 April 2017, Donovan performed an acoustic version of David Bowie's "Heroes" at the 2017 Logie Awards, which received a standing ovation.

Donovan told Luke Dennehy of The Herald Sun the song comes from a deep, personal place. "It's basically my heart breaking on a song, the inspiration is love. Everyone is either happy in love, lost in love, or sad in love. One day when I do fall in love, I will have my ultimate love song." She added: "It's an expression of my life, and what I was feeling at the time of writing it."

Donovan told auspOp: "It has been 10 years since I released my first independent EP Eye 2 Eye and I am so excited to be able to share this with the Australian public. I can't wait for people to hear what I've been working on in the studio. It has been a long while coming. After finishing up with We Will Rock You late last year it dawned upon me that I really wanted to get back into writing my own music and I really wanted to make that my main focus."

== Reception ==
Sounds of Oz said: "This is music in its purest form, with its heart its sleeve and vocals and lyrics that don't hide behind too much studio wizardry. It tells the story of a girl who desperately wants to be loved, yet fears she’ll always be lonely." They also added: "Casey, it's wonderful to have you back."

== Track listing ==
1. Lonely" - 4:06 (Written by Casey Donovan and Daniel Skeed)

Chart (2017)	Peak position
Australian Digital Tracks (ARIA)	48
Australian Artist Singles (ARIA)	20
Australian Independent Singles (AIR)	2
