= Flow (song) =

Single by Casey Donovan

from the album For You
- B-side: "Better to Love"
- Released: 25 July 2005
- Recorded: 2004
- Studio: Eargasm Studios, Sydney
- Genre: Pop
- Label: Sony BMG
- Songwriter(s): Halima Fraval, Jimmy Harry
- Producer(s): Bryon Jones

Casey Donovan singles chronology
"What's Going On" (2005)	"Flow" (2005)	"Big, Beautiful & Sexy" (2010)

"Flow" is a song by Australian singer Casey Donovan. The song was released in July 2005 as the third and final single from her debut studio album For You (2004). The song peaked at number 51 on the ARIA Charts.

== Track listing ==
1. "Flow" (single edit)
2. "Better to Love"
3. "Flow" (CD-ROM video)

== Charts ==
Chart (2006)	Peak position
Australia (ARIA)	51
