= Eye 2 Eye (EP) =

EP by Casey Donovan
- Released: 28 November 2007 (Australia)
- Recorded: July–October 2007
- Genre: Pop, acoustic
- Length: 14:26
- Label: Casey Donovan
- Producer: Casey Donovan

Casey Donovan chronology
| For You (2004) | Eye 2 Eye (2007) | Off the Grid & Somewhere in Between (2017) |

Eye 2 Eye is the debut extended play by Australian singer/songwriter Casey Donovan. The EP was self-produced and self-released and released on 28 November 2007 to a limited physical release, with only 2000 copies printed, and as of 5 December 2007 is available only through her Myspace. Plans are currently underway for a release through selected stores and online retailers, as well as international sales through US company CD Baby. In June 2008 the EP was also released on iTunes Australia, as well as International iTunes Stores, including the US and UK. As of 27 August 2015, CD Baby officially posted YouTube videos for each song from Eye 2 Eye as a playlist.

== Track listing ==
1. "Shattered" – 3:11
2. "Help Me" – 4:09
3. "Did It Again" – 3:02
4. "Eye 2 Eye" – 4:08

== Charts ==
As Donovan released the EP exclusively through her Myspace page, the EP was not eligible to chart on the official Australian Albums Chart.
