= Fitzroy Xpress =

Fitzroy Xpress is an indigenous Aboriginal country rock band from the remote Kimberley town of Fitzroy Crossing, Western Australia.

== Beginnings ==
Members formed as a school band in 1982.

== Career ==
They performed at the Stompen Ground festival in 1992, 1996 and 1998, the Fremantle Arts Festival in 1997 and the "Don’t Dam the River" concert in Broome in 1999. They have also recorded songs in Bunaban, the traditional language of the Kimberley region.

Fitzroy Xpress continues to operate independently, under its own management.

== Awards ==
At the Derby Country Music Festival in 1996 they were winners in the Professional Section, Band Section and Songwriting Section and in 2005, the band won a Deadly Award for Album Release of the Year for Home Sweet Home, beating Australian Idol winner Casey Donovan for the award.

== Documentary ==
Fitzroy Xpress were the subjects of the 2005 documentary Home Sweet Home and an episode of SBS's Blaktrax.
