= What's Going On (Casey Donovan song) =

Single by Casey Donovan

from the album For You
- B-side: "Something Beautiful"
- Released: 21 February 2005
- Recorded: 2004
- Studio: Eargasm Studios, Sydney
- Genre: Pop
- Length: 3:53
- Label: Sony BMG
- Composer(s): Ulric Johansson; Jessica Origliasso; Lisa Origliasso; Erik Nova
- Producer(s): Bryon Jones

Casey Donovan singles chronology
| "Listen with Your Heart" (2004) | "What's Going On" (2005) | "Flow" (2005) |

"What's Going On" is a song by Australian singer Casey Donovan. The song was released in February 2005 as the second single from her debut studio album For You (2004). The song peaked at number 18 on the ARIA Charts.

== Track listing ==
1. "What's Going On"
2. "Something Beautiful"
3. "What's Going On" (CD-ROM video)

== Charts ==
| Chart (2005) | Peak position |
|---|---|
| Australia (ARIA) | 18 |
