= Sandra Eades =

Noongar medical doctor and researcher (born 1967)

Sandra Eades AO FASSA FAHMS FTSE
- Born: Mount Barker, Western Australia
- Occupations: Medical doctor; professor; researcher
- Known for: 2006 NSW Woman of the Year

Sandra Eades (born 1967) is a Noongar medical doctor and researcher, and the first Aboriginal medical practitioner to be awarded a Doctorate of Philosophy in 2003. She was the Dean of Medicine at Curtin University from March 2020, and later was Head of the Indigenous Epidemiology and Health Unit at the University of Melbourne, and from June 2026, joined the School of Public Health and Preventive Medicine at Monash University.

== Early life and education ==
Sandra Eades was born in Mount Barker, Western Australia and at the age of 12 moved to Perth with her family. In primary school, she wanted to be a doctor but thought she would not have that opportunity as an Aboriginal girl. In 1985, at the age of 17, she arrived at University of Newcastle as one of four Aboriginal students selected for a special program to study medicine. She graduated from the University of Western Australia with a PhD in 2003.

== Career ==
Eades worked in the public hospital system after graduating from medical school, and was a general practitioner with the Aboriginal Medical Service for seven years. She began her career researching the epidemiology of Indigenous child health in Australia at the Telethon Institute for Child Health Research. Her first research opportunity into causes of Sudden Infant Death Syndrome (SIDS) in Aboriginal infants in Western Australia, was introduced to her by 2003 Australian of the Year, Fiona Stanley. She has been recognised for "identifying links between social factors such as housing and infant health".

As Head of Indigenous Maternal and Child Health, and Associate Head of Preventative Health Research at Baker IDI Heart and Diabetes Institute, Eades won a number of grants for research in Indigenous health studies. She was senior research fellow at The Sax Institute in Sydney from 2004 to 2008, and an Adjunct Senior Lecturer in the School of Public Health at the University of Sydney from 2012 to 2013. Moving to Melbourne in mid-2008 she joined the Baker Heart and Diabetes Institute and in 2018 she became Associate Dean Indigenous at the University of Melbourne.

Eades was appointed Dean of the Curtin Medical School in March 2020.

== Awards and honours ==
Eades's work in pediatric and perinatal epidemiology has improved the lives of Aboriginal women and children.

- 2005: Deadly award for Outstanding Achievement in Aboriginal and Torres Strait Islander Health, which she dedicated to her three-year-old child.
- 2006: NSW Woman of the Year. Nominated by Frank Sartor, the Minister for Science and Medical Research.
- 2014: Elected Fellow of the Australian Academy of Health and Medical Sciences (FAHMS).
- 2015: Inaugural winner, Lowitja Institute Cranlana Award
- 2020: Elected Fellow of the Academy of the Social Sciences in Australia (FASSA).
- 2022: Officer of the Order of Australia for "distinguished service to medical research, to Indigenous health, and to professional organisations"
- 2023: Elected Honorary Fellow of the Australian Academy of Technological Sciences and Engineering (FTSE).
