= Off the Grid & Somewhere in Between =

EP by Casey Donovan
- Released: 25 August 2017 (Australia)
- Recorded: December 2016 – March 2017
- Genre: Pop
- Label: Casey Donovan

Casey Donovan chronology
Eye 2 Eye (2007)	Off the Grid & Somewhere in Between (2017)

Singles from Off the Grid & Somewhere in Between
- 1. "Lonely" Released: 19 May 2017; 2. "The Villain" Released: 14 July 2017

Off the Grid & Somewhere in Between is an extended play by Australian singer/songwriter Casey Donovan. The EP explores themes of love, loss, addiction and disappointment, and was released on 25 August 2017.

== Background ==
The songs were written over a 3-month period from December 2016 with producer and songwriting collaborator Dan Skeed. The album was financed by a Kickstarter campaign, an experience, which according to Donovan was equal parts gratifying and stressful. She said: "It was nerve wracking asking people for help. I'm not one usually to put my hand up for help. It was very confronting but very rewarding as well. For people to step up and put their money where their mouth was, is a very generous thing and I am forever grateful to those people."

Upon release, Donovan said: "This EP is something that I am extremely proud of. It's an amazing feeling to hear, see, feel and watch your love form a magical bond through melodies that are my soul breaking out of my body and into people's ears through to their hearts. What a great way to get back out into the music industry with 6 original new tracks."

== Track listing ==
1. "Lonely" – 5:10
2. "The Villain" – 3:50
3. "White Dragon" – 3:11
4. "Hear Me Now" – 4:59
5. "Rendezvous" – 3:41
6. "5 O'Clock Dance" – 3:18
7. "Lonely" (radio edit) – 4:06

== Charts ==
Chart (2017)	Peak position
Australian Digital Albums (ARIA)	20
Australian Independent Albums (AIR)	10
