= Bankstown =

- Suburb
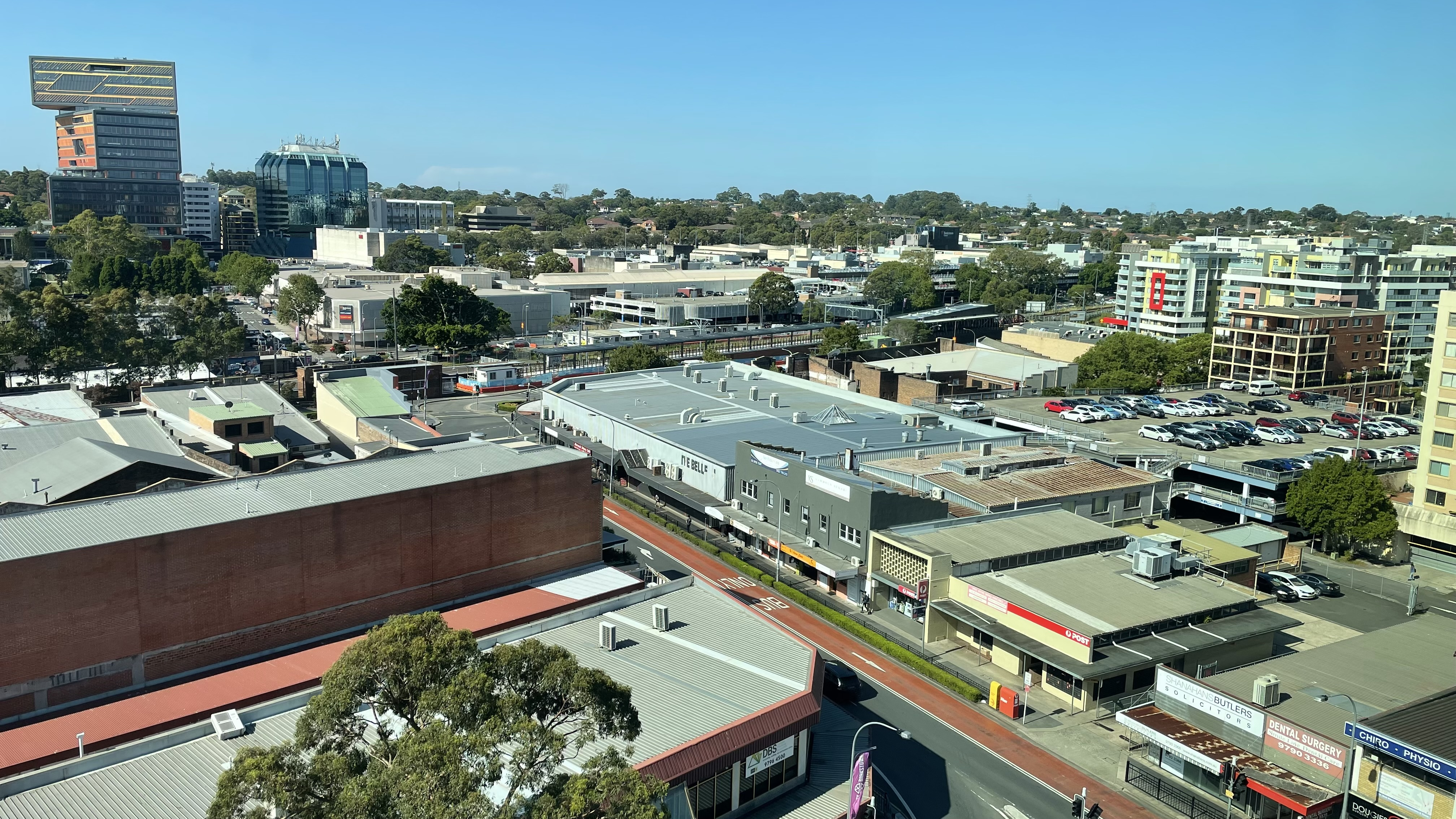
- Bankstown CBD

- Interactive map of Bankstown
- Coordinates: 33°55′05″S 151°02′06″E
- Country: Australia
- State: New South Wales
- City: Sydney
- LGA: City of Canterbury-Bankstown
- Location: 19 km (12 mi) south-west of Sydney CBD
- Established: 1795

Government
  - State electorate: Bankstown
  - Federal divisions: Watson; Banks
- Elevation: 29 m (95 ft)

Population
  - Total: 34,933 (2021 census)
- Postcode: 2200
Suburbs around Bankstown
Yagoona	Chullora	Greenacre
Condell Park	Bankstown	Mount Lewis Punchbowl
Revesby	Padstow	Punchbowl

Bankstown is a suburb of Sydney, in the state of New South Wales, Australia. It is located 19 kilometres south-west of the Sydney central business district and is part of the Canterbury-Bankstown region. Bankstown is the administrative centre and most populous suburb of the City of Canterbury-Bankstown, having previously been the administrative centre of the City of Bankstown prior to 2016.

== History ==
=== Early history ===
Before European settlement, Cumberland Plains woodland occupied much of the area. Turpentine ironbark forest covered much of what is now Bankstown. The land was occupied by the Bediagal people. Their land bordered the Dharawal and the Darung people.

In 1795, Matthew Flinders and George Bass explored up the Georges River for about 32 kilometres (20 mi) beyond what had been previously surveyed, and reported favourably to Governor Hunter of the land on its banks. Hunter examined the country himself, and established one of the pioneer colonies there, called Bank's Town, today written as one word: Bankstown. Hunter named the area Bankstown after Sir Joseph Banks, who travelled to Australia with Captain James Cook in 1770. The area of first European settlement along the river has been partially preserved as part of the Mirambeena Regional Park.

In 1826, bushrangers were hanged on the site of the Bankstown Reservoir water tower.

The first town hall and Council Chambers were opened on 22 Oct 1898 by Mayor Ines Peter Miller on the northern side of the Hume Highway (Liverpool Road), near Rookwood Road (site of the Three Swallows Hotel). In June 1918, the council chambers were relocated to a new building in South Terrace (subsequently Old Town Centre Plaza and, since sometime before 2022, Bankstown City Plaza). The building still stands and now has a shopping arcade running through it. Foundation stones from the old Town Halls have been preserved in a display outside the current Council Chambers.

=== World War II ===
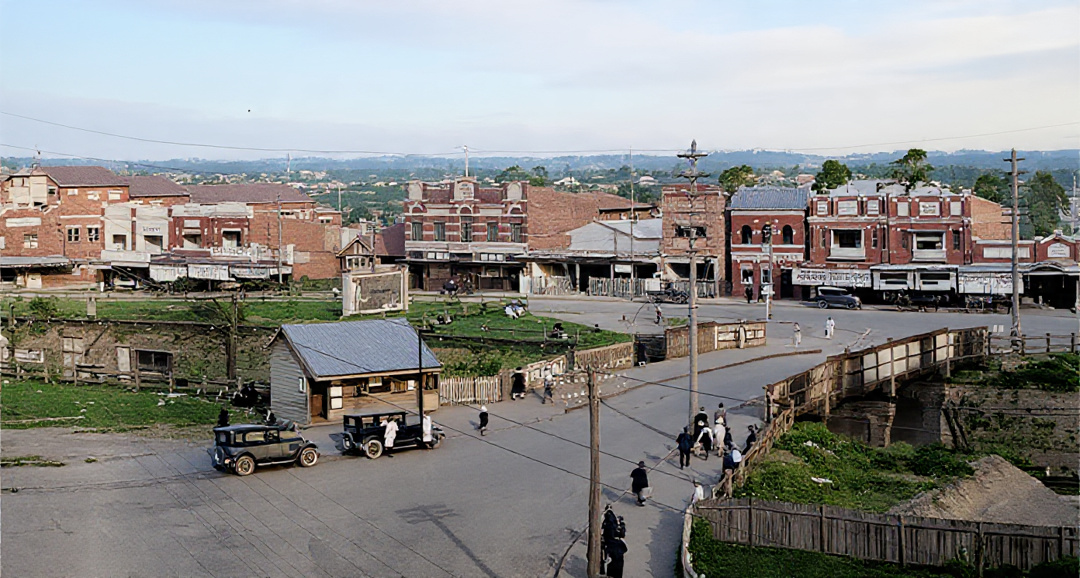
What was to eventually become known as Bankstown Plaza, showing the old railway bridge, 1930s.

With the onset of the Second World War in 1939, conscripted residents were required to report for duty at a drill hall on Canterbury Road, Belmore. Camps were set up in and around Canterbury Racecourse and local parks in the district. Residents with foreign names were sent to internment camps amidst fears of concealed loyalties; a portion of them were Australian citizens who served during World War I.

During World War II, Bankstown Airport was established as a key strategic air base to support the war effort. After the arrival of Douglas MacArthur in Australia, control of Bankstown Airport was handed to US Forces, becoming home to US 35th Fighter Squadron and the 41st Pursuit Squadron of the United States Air Force and the United States Army Air Forces who occupied the airport from 1942 to 1944. In 1945 operations became the responsibility of the British Fleet Air Arm, known as HMS Nabberley, until 1946, when it was handed back to the RAAF.

During this period an RAAF unit known as No. 1 Fighter Sector RAAF took control of the Capital Hall in Bankstown. This unit was formed in Bankstown, on 25 February 1942. Their living quarters were located next door and down the road from the hall and the staff were housed in galvanised iron barracks. Operations were handed over to the United States Army Air Corps on 10 April 1942 before they were transferred to a disused railway tunnel at St James railway station in Sydney. The unit was renamed Air Defence Headquarters Sydney (ADHQ) on 21 January 1945 and moved into a three-storey semi-underground purpose built operations and plotting facility at Bankstown, known as the Bankstown Bunker.

World War II began Bankstown's industrial revolution. Few factories or industry of any consequence were located in Bankstown prior to 1945; this was changed dramatically between 1942 and 1954, especially when the Department of Aircraft Production gave approval for aircraft manufacturer Hawker De Havilland to operate a factory at the airport for the production and manufacture of de Havilland Mosquito bombers. There are now over seven-thousand businesses operating within the Bankstown district.

==== Bankstown Bunker ====
The Bankstown Bunker is a disused RAAF operations facility, located on the corner of Marion and Edgar Street, Bankstown. The specially constructed bunker became an important Royal Australian Air Force headquarters from 1945 until its closure in 1947.

The Bankstown Bunker is of similar design to the underground Ops rooms of wartime England, which directed Britain's air defence fighter plane attacks on the invading German Luftwaffe. Entrance to the bunker was obtained through a concrete passageway which was well screened by a grassy slope; a stairway led to a maze of corridors and hallways leading to various sections.

The Bankstown bunker is currently buried under a public park, surrounded by residential dwellings at the northern end of Taylor Street.

=== Post World War II ===
After World War II, Bankstown's population increased dramatically. People relocated from the inner-city and incoming migrants came, first as refugees from Europe and towards the end of the 20th century from Asia and the Middle East (especially Vietnamese and Lebanese) and the rest of the world.

Bankstown Council relocated to its third premises in 1963 when the Civic Centre that was located at the corner of Chapel Road and The Mall was constructed. It included the Council Chambers, or "Roundhouse". The current town hall was built in 1973. The administration building which was part of the 1963 premises, was destroyed by fire on 1 July 1997. Council offices relocated to Bankstown Civic Tower (the blue tower) in 1999. On 13 June 2000, Bankstown's now popular Central Park, where the former administration building once stood, was officially declared Paul Keating Park.

=== Heritage ===
Bankstown has a number of heritage-listed sites, including Bankstown Reservoir in Beresford Avenue.

== Climate ==
Bankstown has a humid subtropical climate (Köppen climate classification: Cfa). Like most of Western Sydney, it has warm to hot summers and mild winters. The average summer temperature range is from 17.6 °C (63.7 °F) to 27.8 °C (82.0 °F), although hot north-westerly winds can cause temperatures to rise up to 40 °C (104 °F). On average, Bankstown has 8.8 days per year where the temperature rises above 35 °C (95 °F), as opposed to only 3.0 days for Sydney Observatory Hill. The average winter temperature range is from 5.9 °C (42.6 °F) to 18.0 °C (64.4 °F). On an average of one night a year, the minimum temperature falls below freezing (0 °C).

The highest temperature recorded at Bankstown was 46.1 °C (115.0 °F) on 18 January 2013, and the lowest temperature recorded was −4.0 °C (24.8 °F) on 26 July 1968. Bankstown's annual mean rainfall is 869.0mm, slightly less than the Sydney CBD, which is affected more by coastal showers which do not penetrate very far inland.

Climate data for Bankstown Airport AWS (1991−2020 averages, extremes 1968−present)
Month	Jan	Feb	Mar	Apr	May	Jun	Jul	Aug	Sep	Oct	Nov	Dec	Year
Record high °C (°F)	47.0 (116.6)	45.3 (113.5)	41.3 (106.3)	36.9 (98.4)	28.8 (83.8)	25.4 (77.7)	26.8 (80.2)	30.5 (86.9)	35.6 (96.1)	39.7 (103.5)	43.1 (109.6)	44.9 (112.8)	47.0 (116.6)
Mean daily maximum °C (°F)	29.0 (84.2)	28.2 (82.8)	26.5 (79.7)	24.0 (75.2)	20.8 (69.4)	18.0 (64.4)	17.6 (63.7)	19.3 (66.7)	22.2 (72.0)	24.4 (75.9)	25.8 (78.4)	27.6 (81.7)	23.6 (74.5)
Mean daily minimum °C (°F)	18.5 (65.3)	18.3 (64.9)	16.4 (61.5)	12.8 (55.0)	9.3 (48.7)	6.9 (44.4)	5.4 (41.7)	6.0 (42.8)	8.9 (48.0)	12.0 (53.6)	14.7 (58.5)	16.8 (62.2)	12.2 (53.9)
Record low °C (°F)	10.4 (50.7)	10.0 (50.0)	7.8 (46.0)	2.4 (36.3)	0.7 (33.3)	−1.9 (28.6)	−4.0 (24.8)	−0.7 (30.7)	0.0 (32.0)	4.4 (39.9)	6.8 (44.2)	6.3 (43.3)	−4.0 (24.8)
Average precipitation mm (inches)	87.3 (3.44)	107.3 (4.22)	81.7 (3.22)	67.1 (2.64)	55.1 (2.17)	83.0 (3.27)	44.5 (1.75)	42.7 (1.68)	44.2 (1.74)	53.2 (2.09)	67.8 (2.67)	66.6 (2.62)	800.5 (31.51)
Average precipitation days (≥ 1.0 mm)	7.6	7.4	8.3	6.2	5.8	6.8	5.4	3.9	5.0	6.0	7.4	7.5	77.3
Average afternoon relative humidity (%)	54	57	56	53	55	55	52	43	44	48	52	52	52
Average dew point °C (°F)	16.3 (61.3)	17.1 (62.8)	15.2 (59.4)	12.1 (53.8)	9.7 (49.5)	7.5 (45.5)	6.0 (42.8)	5.2 (41.4)	7.4 (45.3)	9.7 (49.5)	12.4 (54.3)	14.4 (57.9)	11.1 (52.0)
Source: Bureau of Meteorology

== Commercial area ==
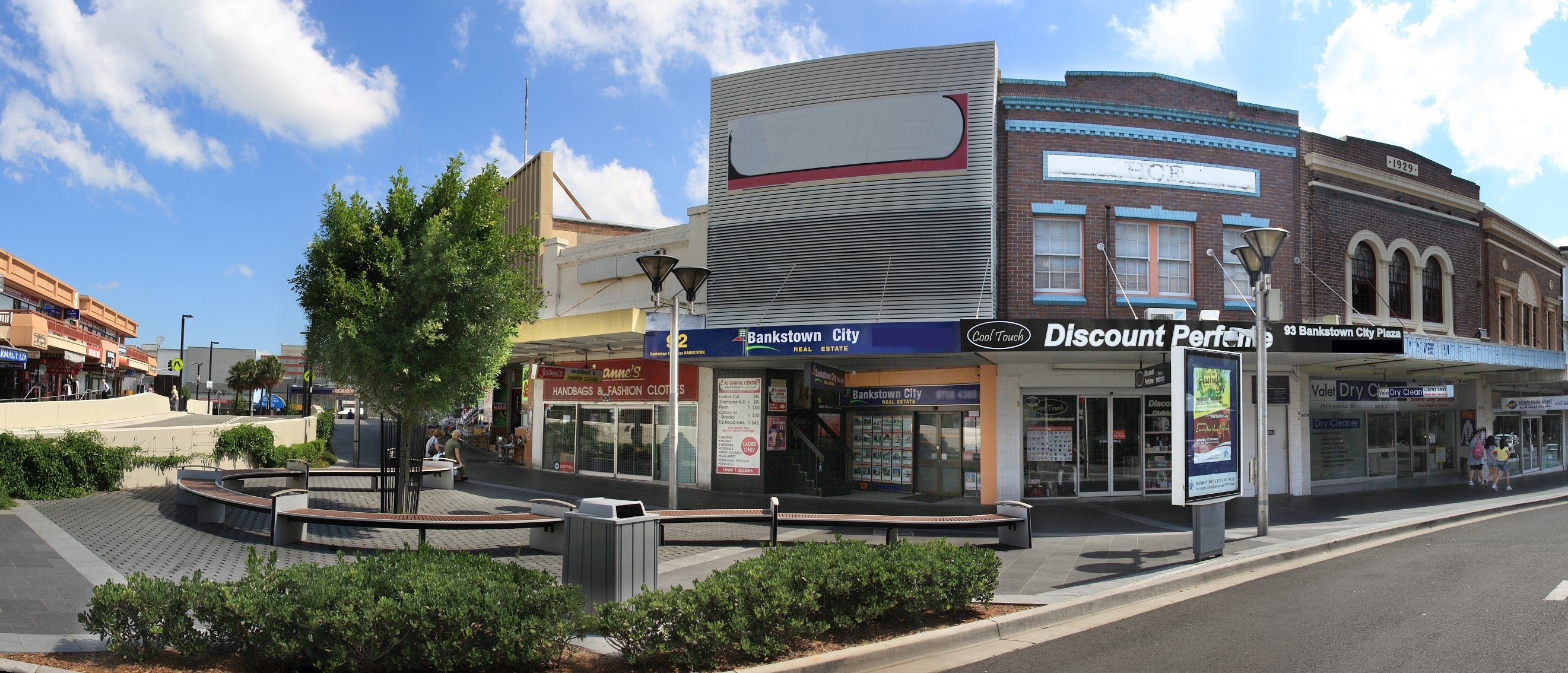
Bankstown Plaza

Bankstown's central business district is clustered around Bankstown railway station. The commercial area beside the railway station is known as Bankstown Plaza, while the ethnic diversity of the area has resulted in a host of restaurants, eateries and cafes.

Bankstown Central, formerly known as Centro Bankstown and previously known as Bankstown Square, is a large shopping centre, immediately to the northeast of the railway station. It was first opened in 1966 and has been expanded a number of times.

Bankstown is the seat of major industry including the aviation, engineering and maintenance at Bankstown Airport. Other employers include small industrial operations, the public service and the retail industry. The suburb is affected with unusually high unemployment and is subject to a dedicated income management program specifically targeting the problem.

== Transport ==
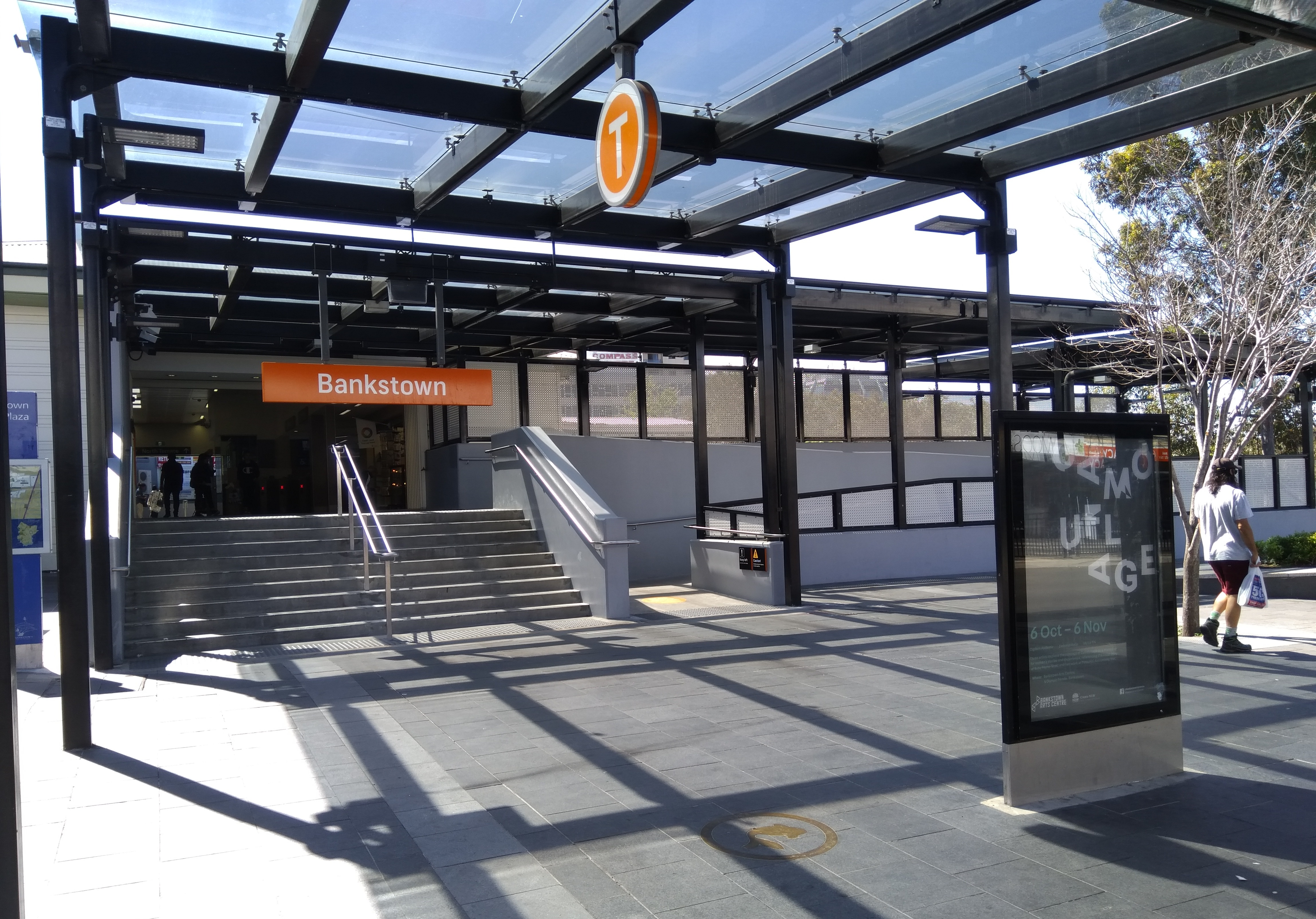
Southern entrance to Bankstown railway station

Bankstown railway station is on the Bankstown line of the Sydney Trains network. The rail line was built to Belmore in 1895 and then extended to Bankstown in 1909. The line was electrified in 1926. In 1928, the line was extended westwards from Bankstown to join the Main Suburban railway at Lidcombe and the Main South line to Liverpool. The station was semi-closed on 30 September 2024 to allow for the line eastwards, which reopened on 30 October 2026, servicing the Sydney Metro; the Metro trains were subsequently rebranded Metro North West & Bankstown Line.

Bankstown is a major bus interchange for a number of bus services.

The Sydney Metropolitan Airport, more commonly known as Bankstown Airport, was established in 1940 and is constructed on 313 hectares. It has three runways, an extensive taxiway and includes a large business park containing over 170 businesses.

== Parks ==
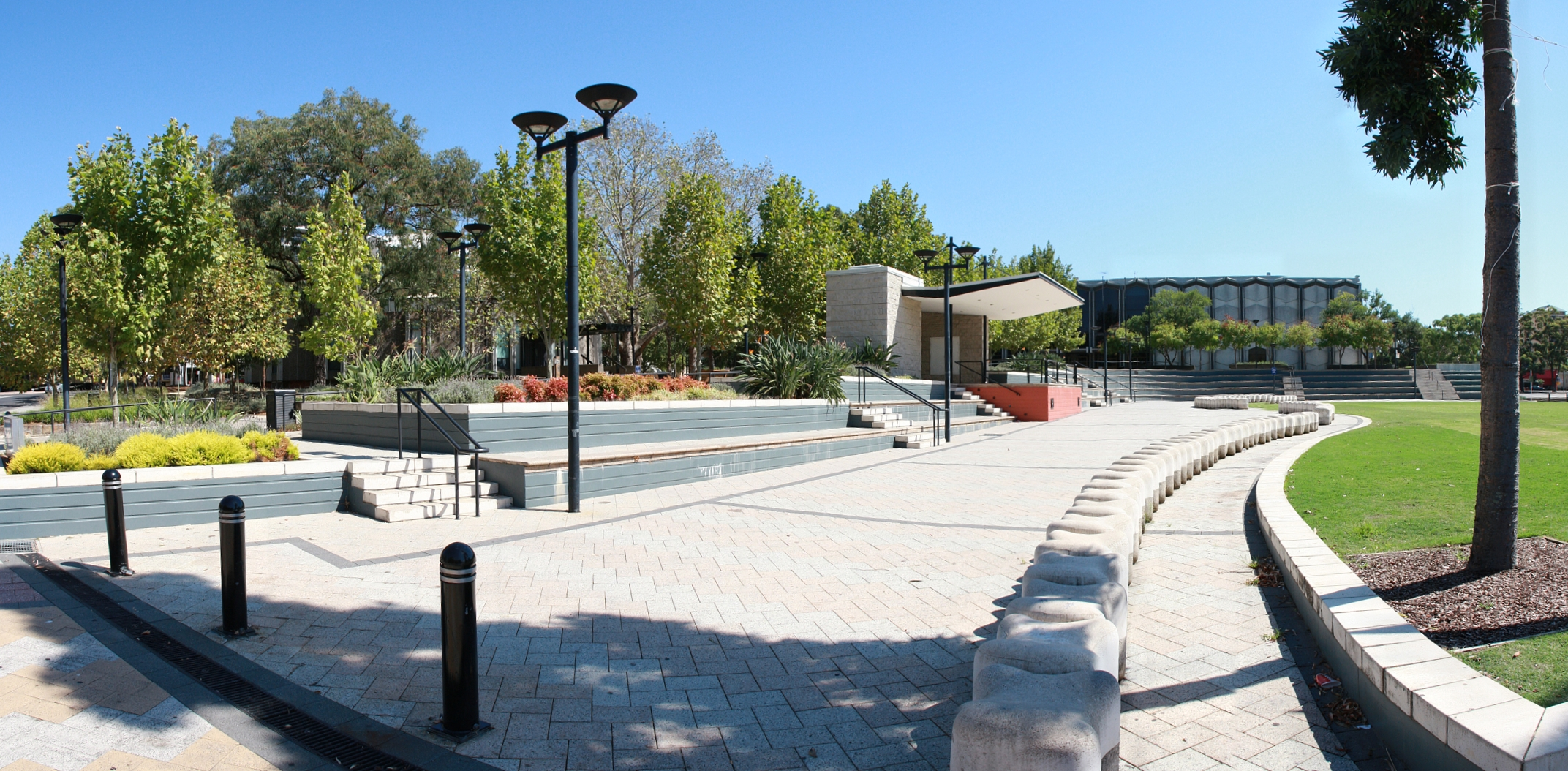
Paul Keating Park

Major parks within Bankstown include Bankstown City Gardens, Bankstown Oval, Griffith Park, McLeod Reserve and Paul Keating Park.

'Bankstown City Gardens' were opened to the public in 1973. These gardens consist of many unusual types of flora found in Bankstown and the surrounding area. The park consist of different areas, native, tropical, rose garden and Perennial.

'Paul Keating Park' was built on the site of Bankstown Council's former administration building, after it was destroyed by fire on 1 July 1997.

== Education ==
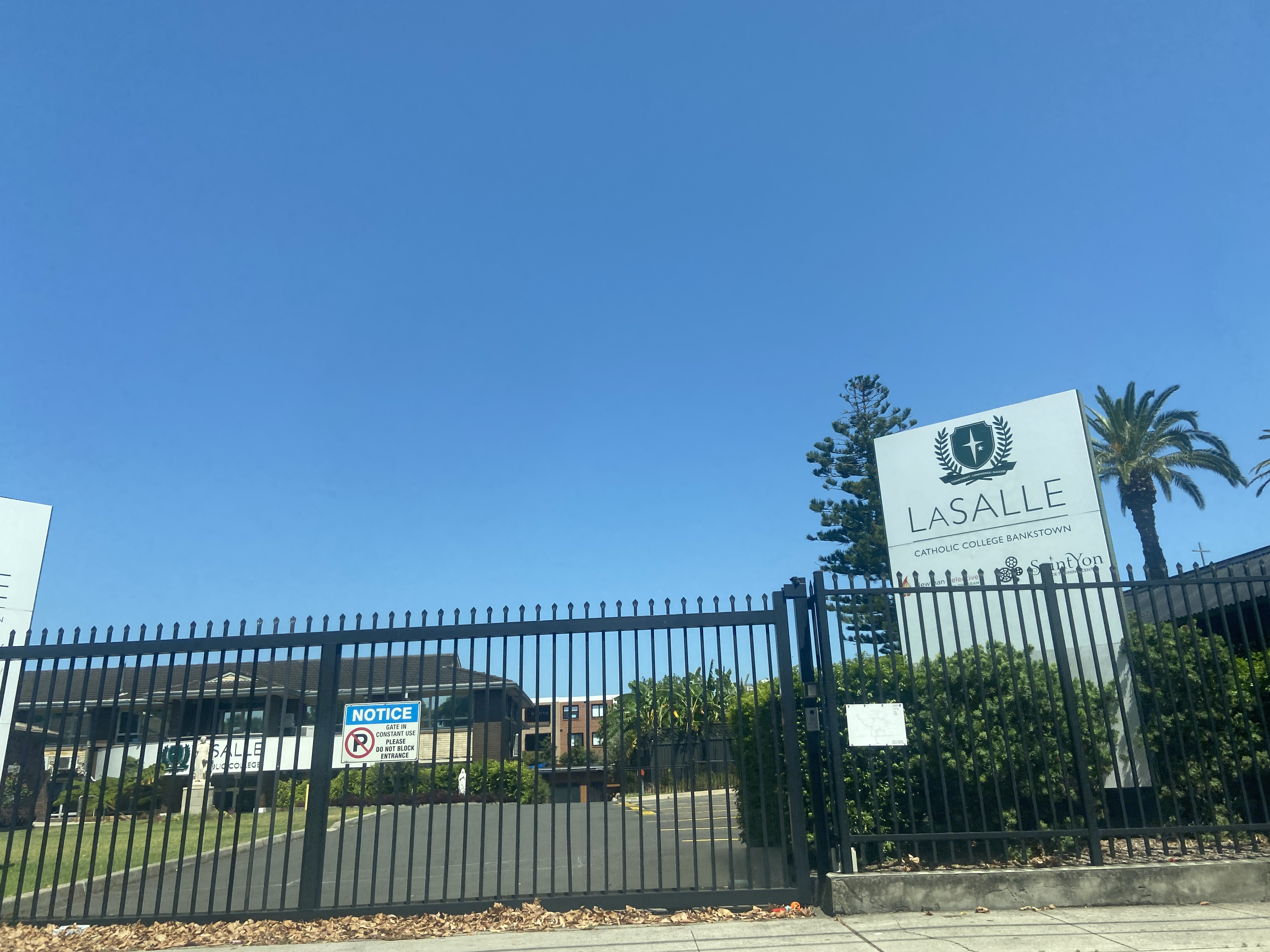
LaSalle Catholic College, Bankstown

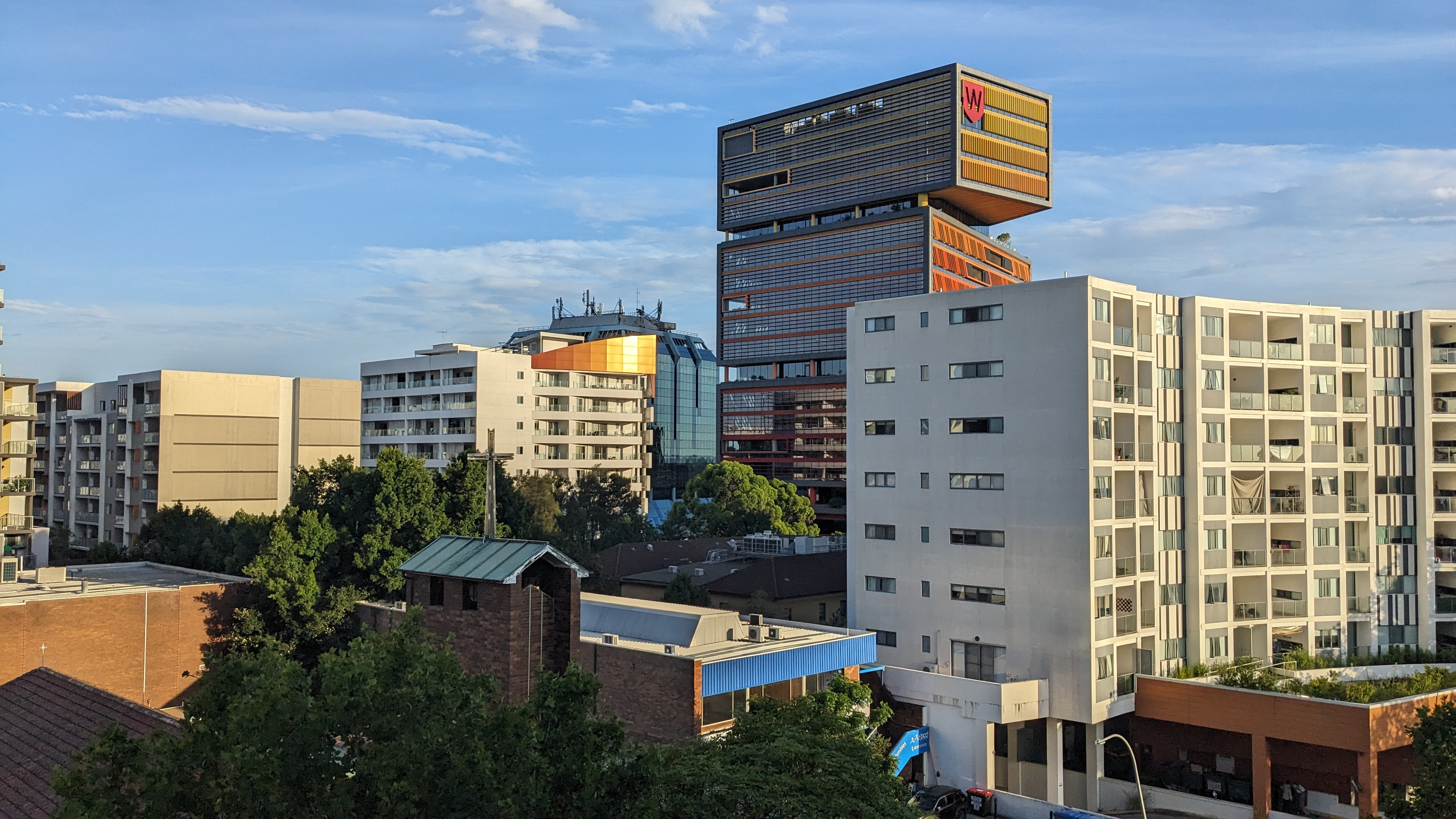
Western Sydney University, Bankstown City campus

=== Primary and secondary education ===
St Felix Catholic Primary School Bankstown was founded in 1853, when the area was known as "Irishtown". After Francis Moran, the Catholic archbishop of Sydney had asked for assistance from Mary MacKillop, in 1887 the Josephite sisters assumed charge of the school. In 1983, the Catholic Education Office took over, and appointed Shirley Jackson as the first lay principal of the school. One notable alumnus is Elizabeth Reid, later Women's Adviser to Prime Minister Gough Whitlam. As of 2025 the school is operational.

In 1862, a Church of England School was first opened, and was commissioned as a public school in 1867.

In 1880, Bankstown's first public school was built on land now established as McLeod Reserve. In 1882, there were 49 boys and 36 girls enrolled, and upkeep expenses totalled 219 pounds, eight shillings and 11 pence. The school's first headmaster was Dugald McLeod who taught at the school since its opening until 1912. The site of the well used by Bankstown Public School is today commemorated by a plaque. The school was demolished in 1924 due to the development of North Bankstown School in the same year.

Bankstown Public School, located on Restwell Street, opened in 1915, and celebrated its centenary in 2015. Bankstown West Public School, located on the western side of the suburb, opened in 1931. Since then Bankstown has seen the development of several different educational facilities, such as, Al Amanah College, Bankstown Senior College (formerly Bankstown Boys High School 1963–1991), Bankstown Girls High School, Georges River Grammar School, LaSalle Catholic College, and St Euphemia College.

=== Tertiary education ===
Tertiary institutions located in the suburb include TAFE NSW Bankstown and the Western Sydney University Bankstown City campus.

== Sports ==
Bankstown is represented in the National Rugby League by the Canterbury-Bankstown Bulldogs. Bankstown District Cricket Club, which plays its home games at the Bankstown Oval, represents the suburb in the NSW Premier Cricket competition. Bankstown Bruins, which plays its home games at the Bankstown Basketball Stadium, represents the suburb in the NBL1 East. Bankstown City Lions FC and Canterbury Bankstown FC represents the suburb in the NSW League One competition.

== Community facilities ==
=== Health ===
The NSW Government has committed $1.3 billion for a new hospital in the Bankstown CBD. The new Bankstown Hospital will be located at the site of TAFE Bankstown Campus and is expected to open by 2030.

=== Library ===
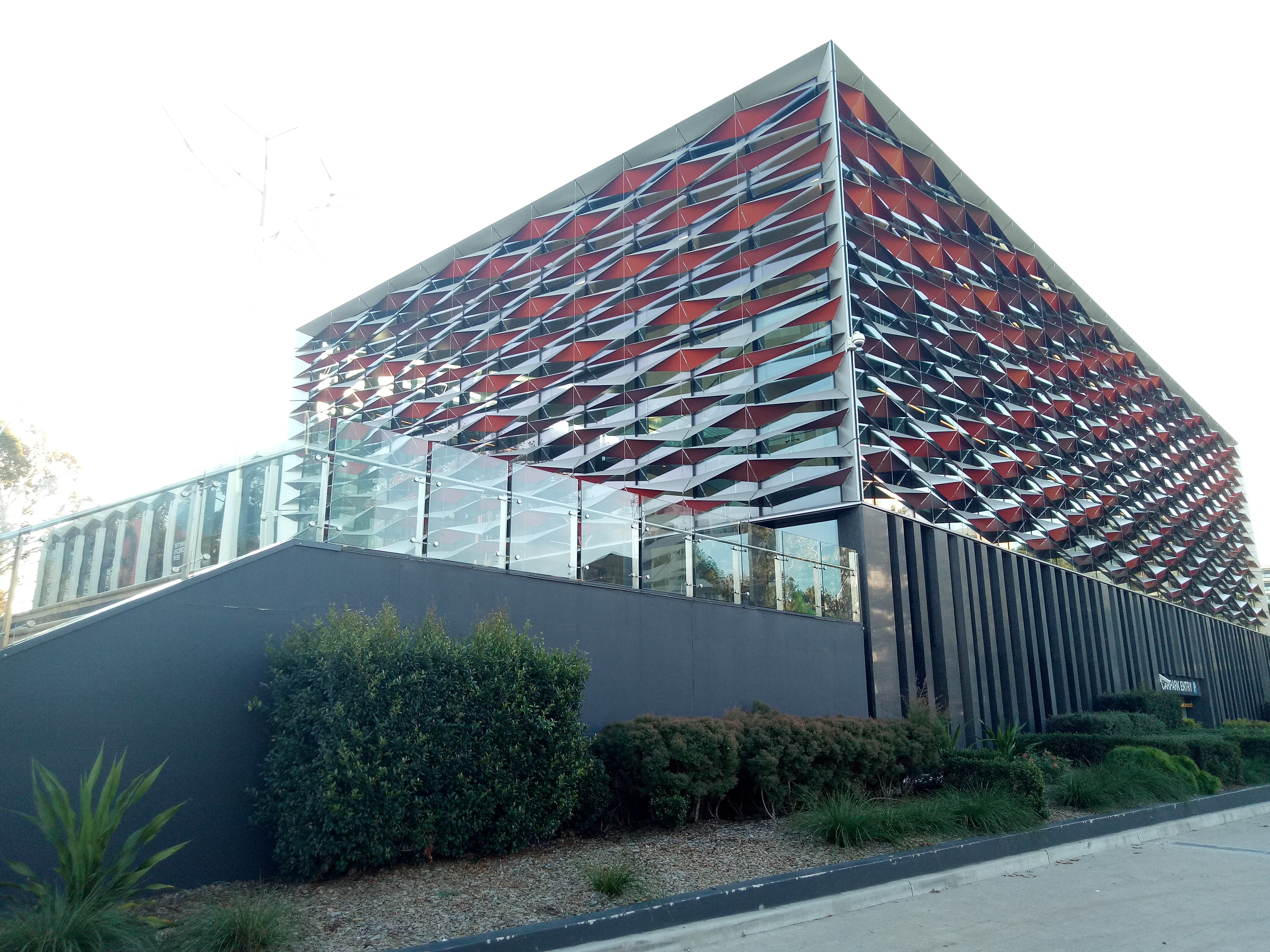
Bankstown Library and Knowledge Centre

The Bankstown Central Library has served Bankstown on its present site in The Mall since 1954. Eight years earlier in 1946, Bankstown became the first municipality to adopt the Library Act of 1939 by opening a Children's Library, located at Restwell Street. The Bankstown Central Library was demolished in 1981 to make way for a different facility which opened in 1983.

Bankstown's current library, the Bankstown Library and Knowledge Centre was opened in April 2014. The library was designed by FJMT and is located next to the Western Sydney University Bankstown Campus.

=== Places of worship ===
Truc Lam and Huyen Quang Temple, Vietnamese Buddhist temples, are located in the suburb.

St Felix de Valois Parish, St Brendan Catholic Church, Bankstown District Uniting Church and St Euphemia Greek Orthodox Church are located in the suburb.

In 1991, the Bankstown Synagogue in Sydney was the subject of an arson attack which destroyed the building. The synagogue was established in 1914. The site was redeveloped and serves as a Uniting Church Aged Care facility.

== Demographics ==
Historical population
Year	Pop.	±%
2001	25,293	—
2006	26,446	+4.6%
2011	30,572	+15.6%
2016	32,113	+5.0%
2021	34,933	+8.8%
2026 (Est)	37,280	+6.7%

In the 2021 census, Bankstown recorded a population of 34,933 people, of which 50.4% were female and 49.6% were male. The median age of the Bankstown population was 34 years, 4 years below the national median of 38.

Bankstown has one of the most ethnically diverse communities in Australia. Bankstown is considered one of the most multicultural areas in the country with over 60 different languages spoken by the people of this suburb. 36.1% of people living in Bankstown were born in Australia. The next top responses for country of birth were 15.6% Vietnam, 6.0% Lebanon, 4.8% China (excludes Taiwan and SARs), 3.2% Pakistan and 3.1% Bangladesh. The most common ancestries in Bankstown were 18.7% Vietnamese, 11.9% Lebanese, 10.8% Chinese, 8.6% Australian and 6.2% English. 18.0% of people spoke only English at home; the next most common languages were 20.3% Vietnamese, 19.3% Arabic, 5.1% Urdu, 4.7% Mandarin and 3.7% Bengali.

The most common responses for religion were 31.1% Islam, 16.3% Roman Catholicism, 15.5% no religion, 11.0% Buddhism and 9.3% not stated.

The median weekly household income in Bankstown was $1,531, and the median weekly family income was $2,436.

The average population growth per year is 1.56%.

== Notable people ==
The following people are residents or former residents of Bankstown:

- Brian Brown, actor, producer, author
- Jack Cogger, former Canterbury-Bankstown Bulldogs player
- Glenn Coleman, former Cronulla Sharks player and chairman
- Patti Crocker, actress and author of Radio Days
- Paulini Curuenavuli, finalist from the first Australian Idol
- Isaac De Gois, former rugby league player
- Casey Donovan, winner of the second Australian Idol
- Brett Emerton, former Socceroo
- Blake Ferguson, former rugby league player
- Ashleigh Gardner, Australian cricketer
- Brett Holman, former Socceroo
- Paul Keating, 24th Prime Minister of Australia
- John and Ilsa Konrads, siblings and world record-breaking swimmers
- Lonnie Lee, Australian pop musician – East Bankstown now Greenacre 1956–1959
- Jordan Mailata, Current starting left tackle for the Philadelphia Eagles of the NFL. Two time Pro Bowl alternate (2023, 2024)
- Peter Mata'utia, current Castleford Tigers player
- Melanie Roche, Olympic medallist in softball
- Andrew Scipione, former Commissioner of the New South Wales Police Force
- Mark Waugh and Steve Waugh, Australian Test cricketing twins.
- Grayson Waller, professional wrestler in WWE and former secondary school teacher

== Gallery ==
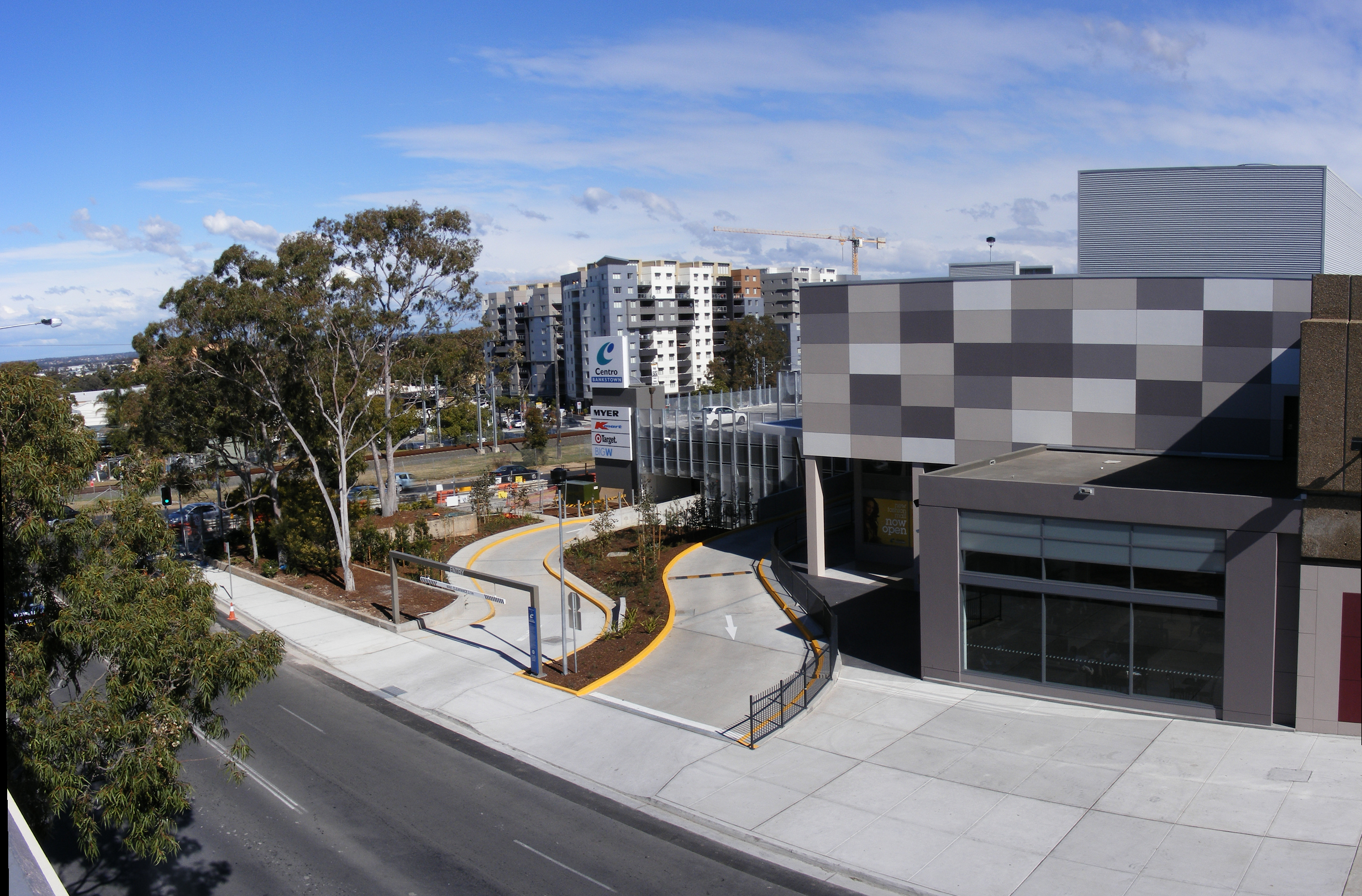
Bankstown Central

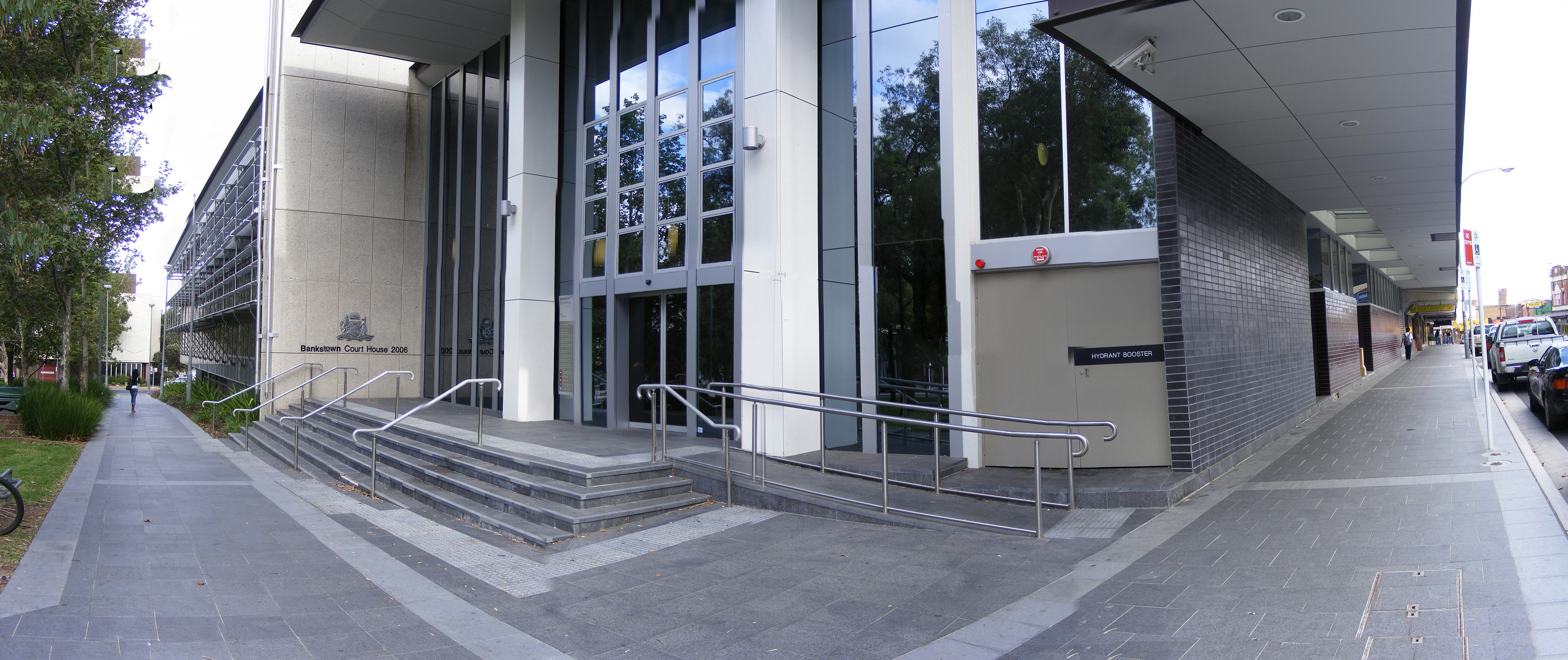
Bankstown Court House

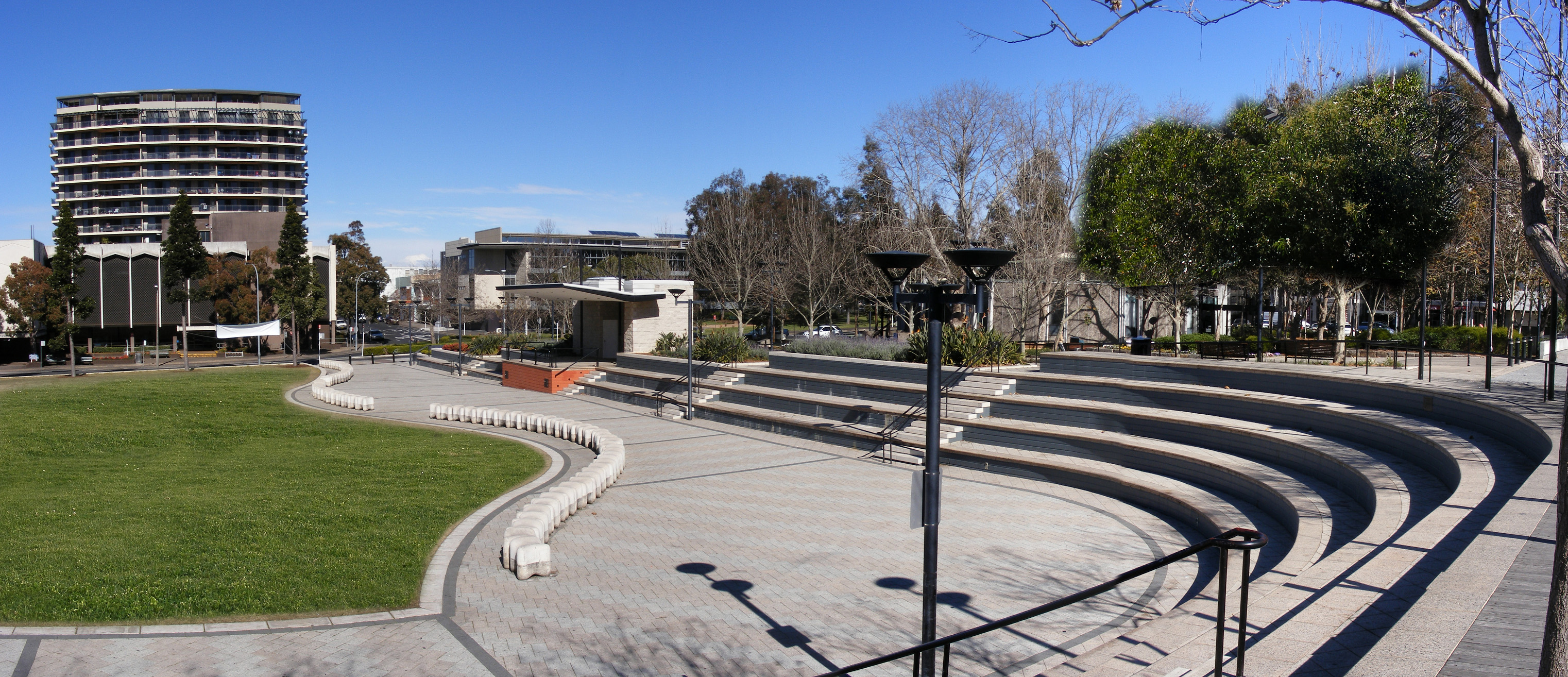
Paul Keating Park

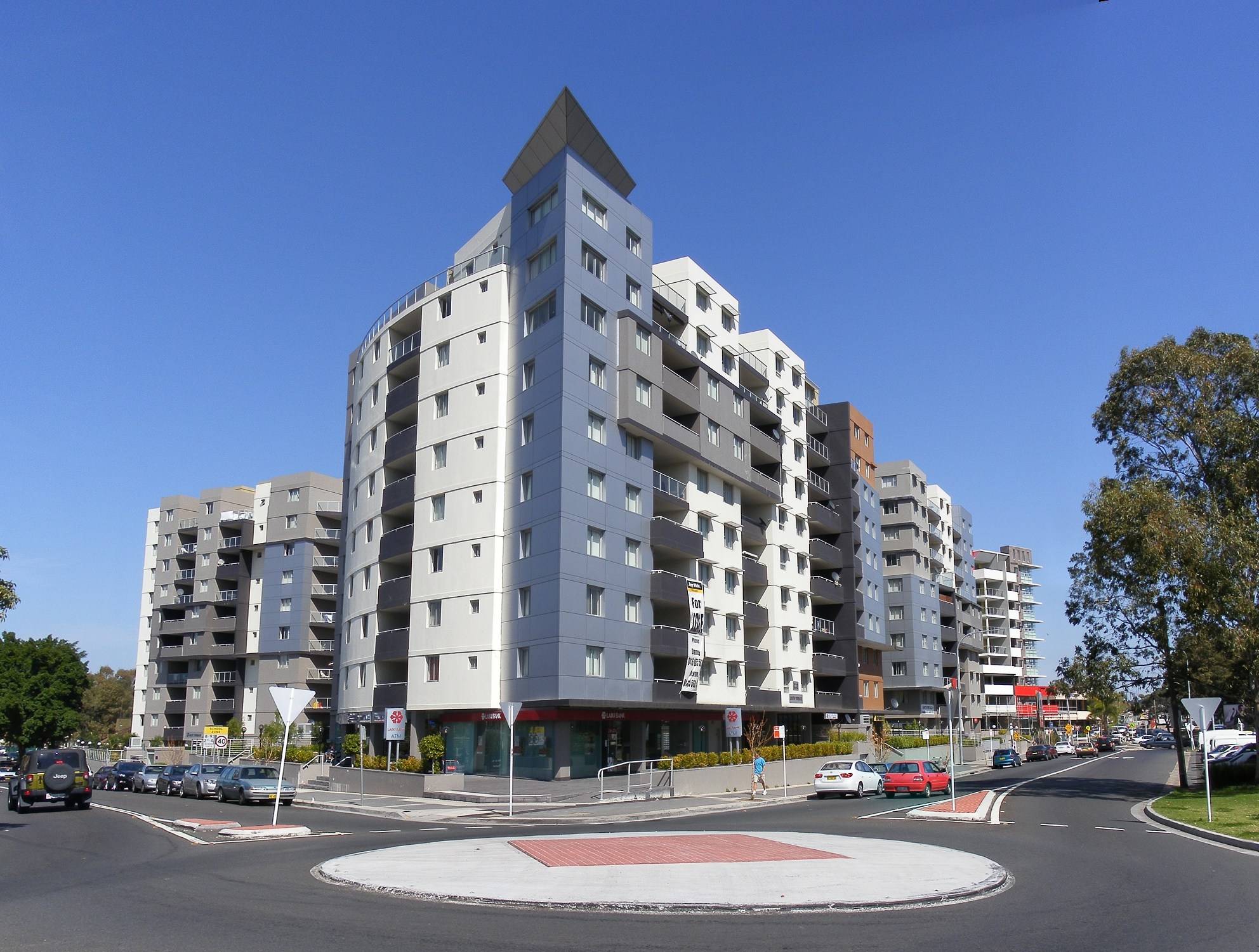
Contemporary apartments in South Terrace, Bankstown

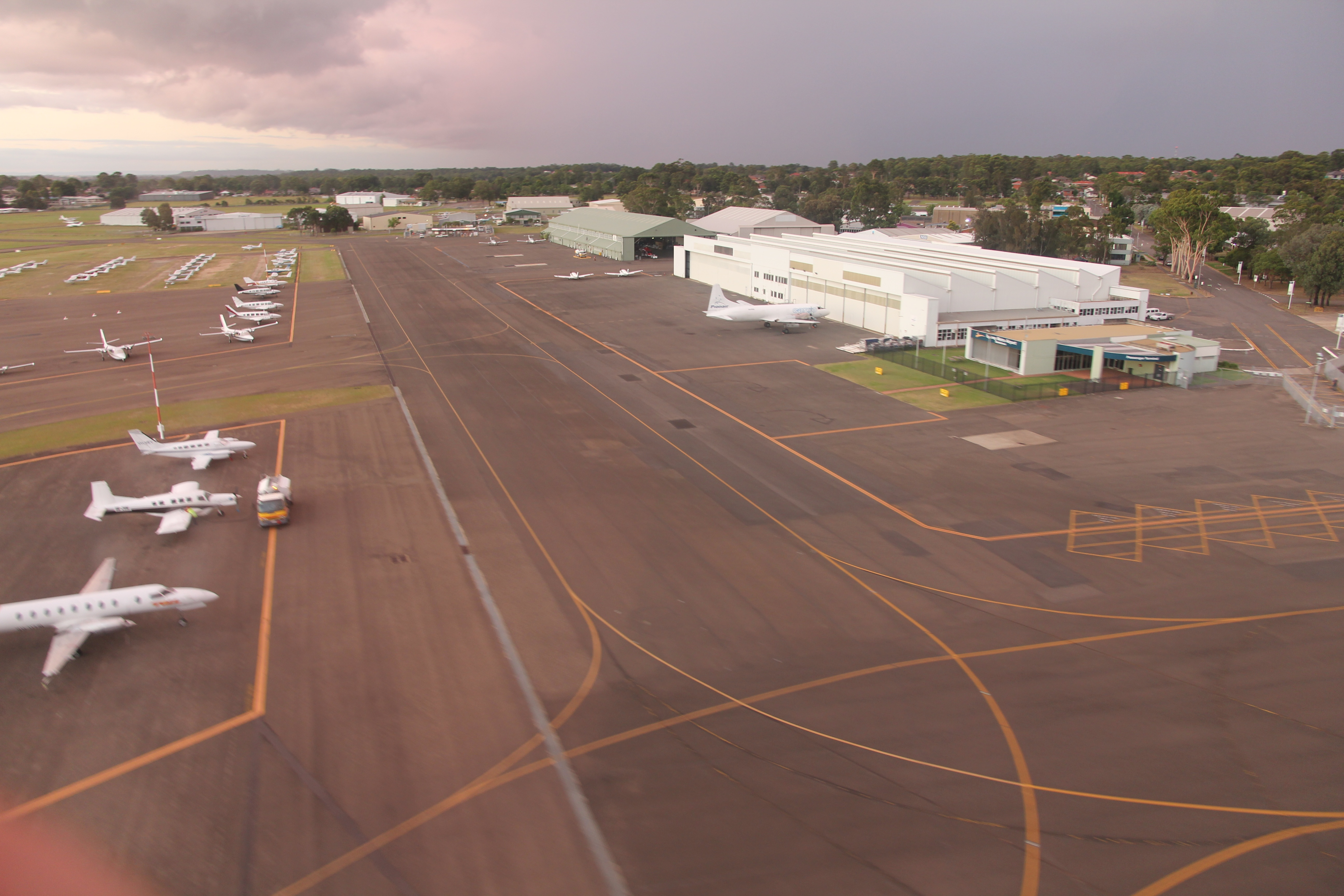
Bankstown Airport

Bankstown Reservoir is a heritage item managed by Sydney Water

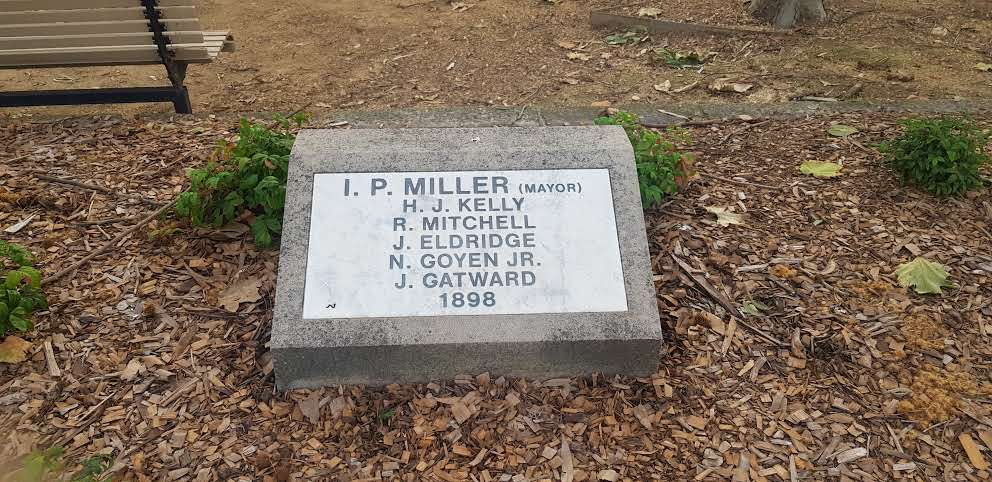
Foundation Stone from first Bankstown Town hall

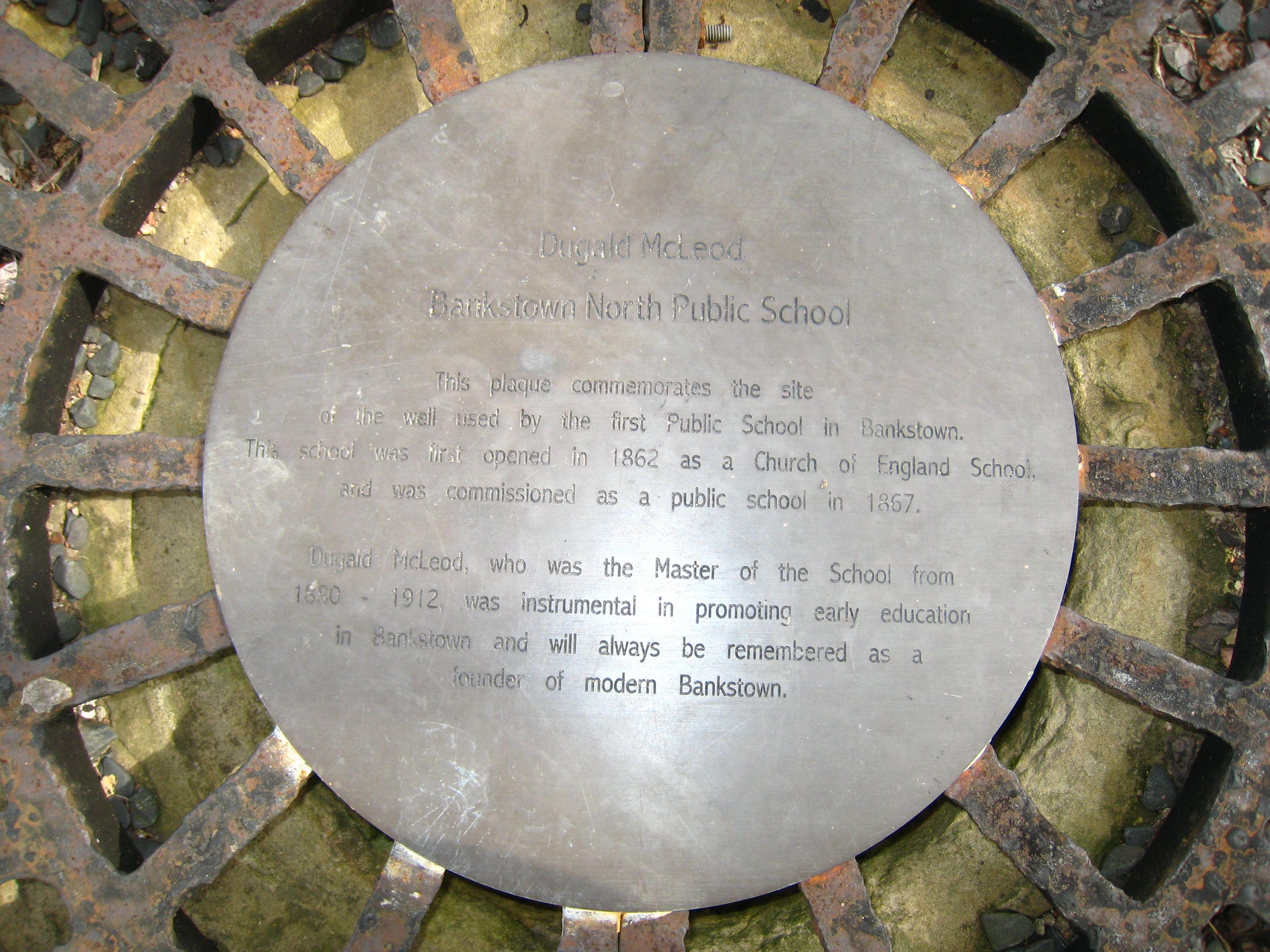
McLeod Reserve

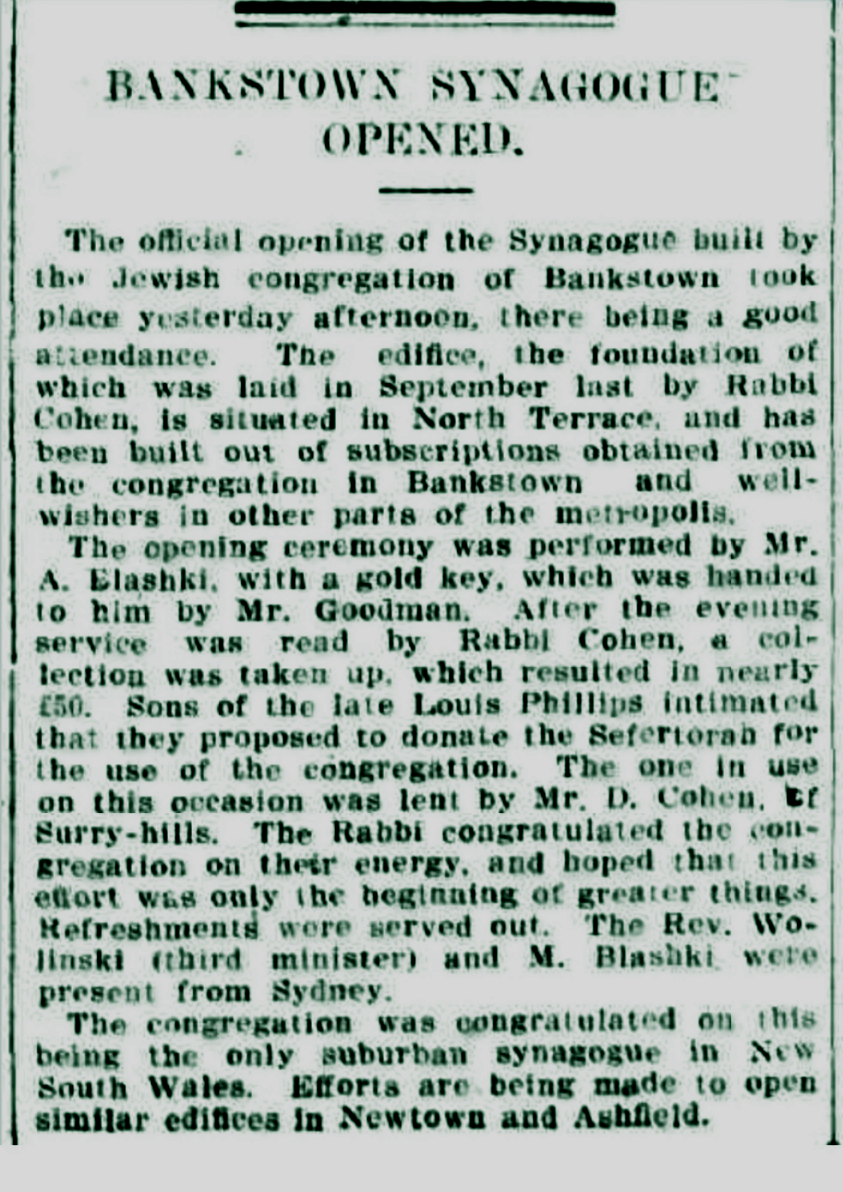
1914 founding of the Bankstown Synagogue
