= St Euphemia College =

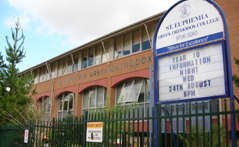
- St Euphemia College, viewed from Stacey Street

Location
- 202 Stacey Street, Bankstown; South-western Sydney, New South Wales; Australia; 33°55′10″S 151°02′22″E

Information
- Type: Independent co-educational preparatory, primary and secondary day school,Semi-Private school
- Motto: Strive for excellence
- Religious affiliation: Greek Orthodox Archdiocese of Australia
- Denomination: Greek Orthodoxy
- Patron saint: Saint Euphemia
- Established: 30 January 1989; 37 years ago
- Educational authority: New South Wales Department of Education
- Principal: Ms Penny Pachos
- Teaching staff: 52 FTE (2025)
- Employees: 70.8 FTE (2025)
- Years: Preschool and K–12
- Enrollment: 622 (2025)
- School fees: A$4972–8,887 (2026)
- Affiliation: Junior School Heads Association of Australia
- Website: www.steuphemia.nsw.edu.au

St Euphemia College is an independent Greek Orthodox co-educational prep, primary and secondary day school, located in Bankstown, a south-western suburb of Sydney, New South Wales, Australia. Named in honour of Saint Euphemia, the College commenced on 30 January 1989 with 29 students from Kindergarten to Year 3. It is registered as a charity with the Australian Charities and Not-for-profits Commission.

== History ==
Archbishop Stylianos conducted the official opening of the College on 26 February 1989. The college's secondary school commenced in 1993 with 31 students. The school now provides a comprehensive and religious education for students from Kindergarten to Year 12.

St Euphemia College was established by the community to preserve the Greek Orthodox culture and ethos in the local community. The Church which is part of the College Campus, was established in 1964. The College belongs to the Greek Orthodox Parish and Community of Bankstown. According to data from the Australian Curriculum, Assessment and Reporting Authority, 54% of the students have a language background other than English.

In 2013, St Euphemia received a $323,000 grant from the Federal Government’s Secure Schools Program "to install CCTV, fencing, intercom and Access Control".

As of 2021, the Principal was Rev Father Mavrommatis and the school had an enrolment of approximately 610 students.

=== Greek culture and history ===
Students from St Euphemia College participate in events commemorating events in Greek history, such as the bicentennial of Greek Independence Day, Remembrance Day, and OXI Day.

== Primary school ==
St Euphemia College primary school caters for students from Kindergarten to Year 6.

In addition to teachers, the staff includes a librarian, an ESL teacher, a School Counsellor, an IT teacher and specialist teachers in Greek.

== High school ==
St Euphemia High School was founded several years later than the primary school. The school first participated in the NSW Higher School Certificate (HSC) in 1998. In 2019 The Daily Telegraph reported, "St Euphemia College, an independent school in Bankstown, has also enjoyed a stunning climb up the rankings." In 2020, The Daily Telegraph listed St Euphemia College among the "top performing high schools in Bankstown–Canterbury".

In 2018, senior secondary certificates were awarded to 78 students, but the number of graduates declined to 48 in 2019 and 44 in 2020. During a November 2020 graduation ceremony, Archbishop Makarios congratulated graduates on completing high school, "despite the challenges they faced due to the coronavirus pandemic".

The high school curriculum subjects include mathematics, English, human society and its environment, computing studies, personal development, health and physical education, Greek, science, careers, design and technology, music and visual arts.

In November 2023, St Euphemia College's 'Changemakers' Documentary won 'Best Outreach Film' at the Helsinki Education Film Festival International (HEFFI).

== See also ==
- List of non-government schools in New South Wales
- Greek Orthodox Archdiocese of Australia
- Greek Orthodox churches in New South Wales
