= McLeod Reserve =

Park in Australia

Coordinates: 33°54′28″S 151°01′55″E

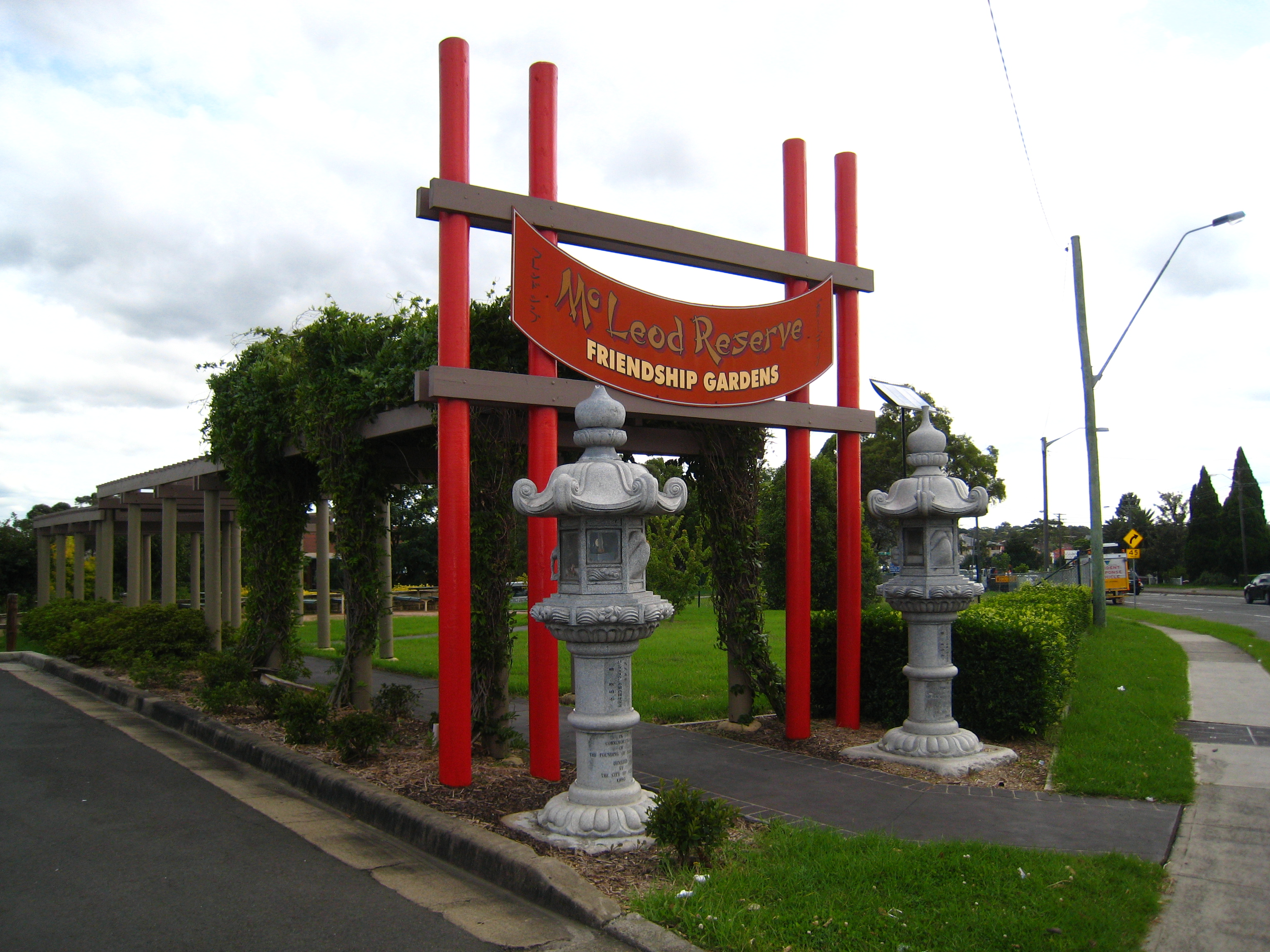
McLeod Reserve

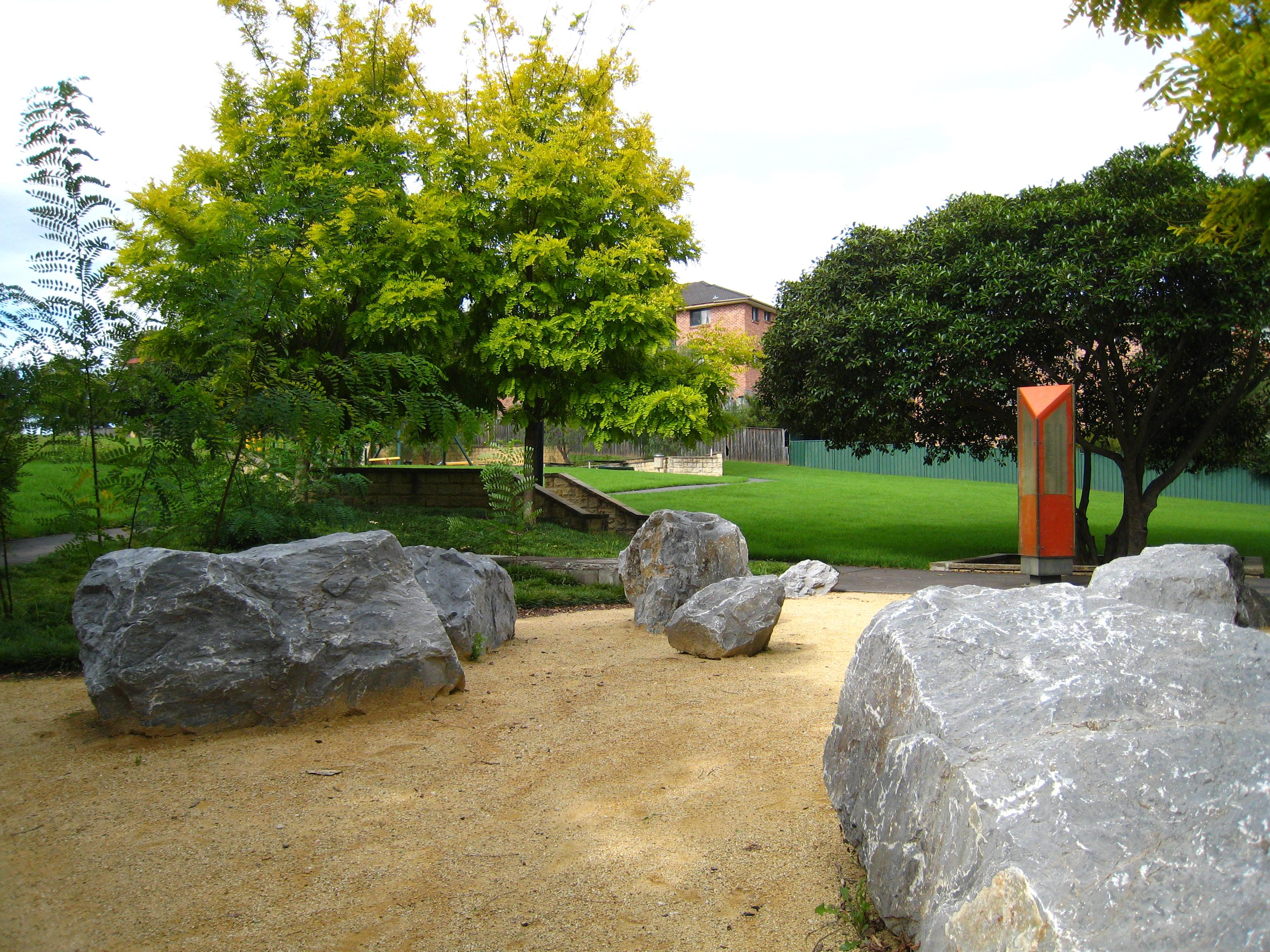
Friendship Garden

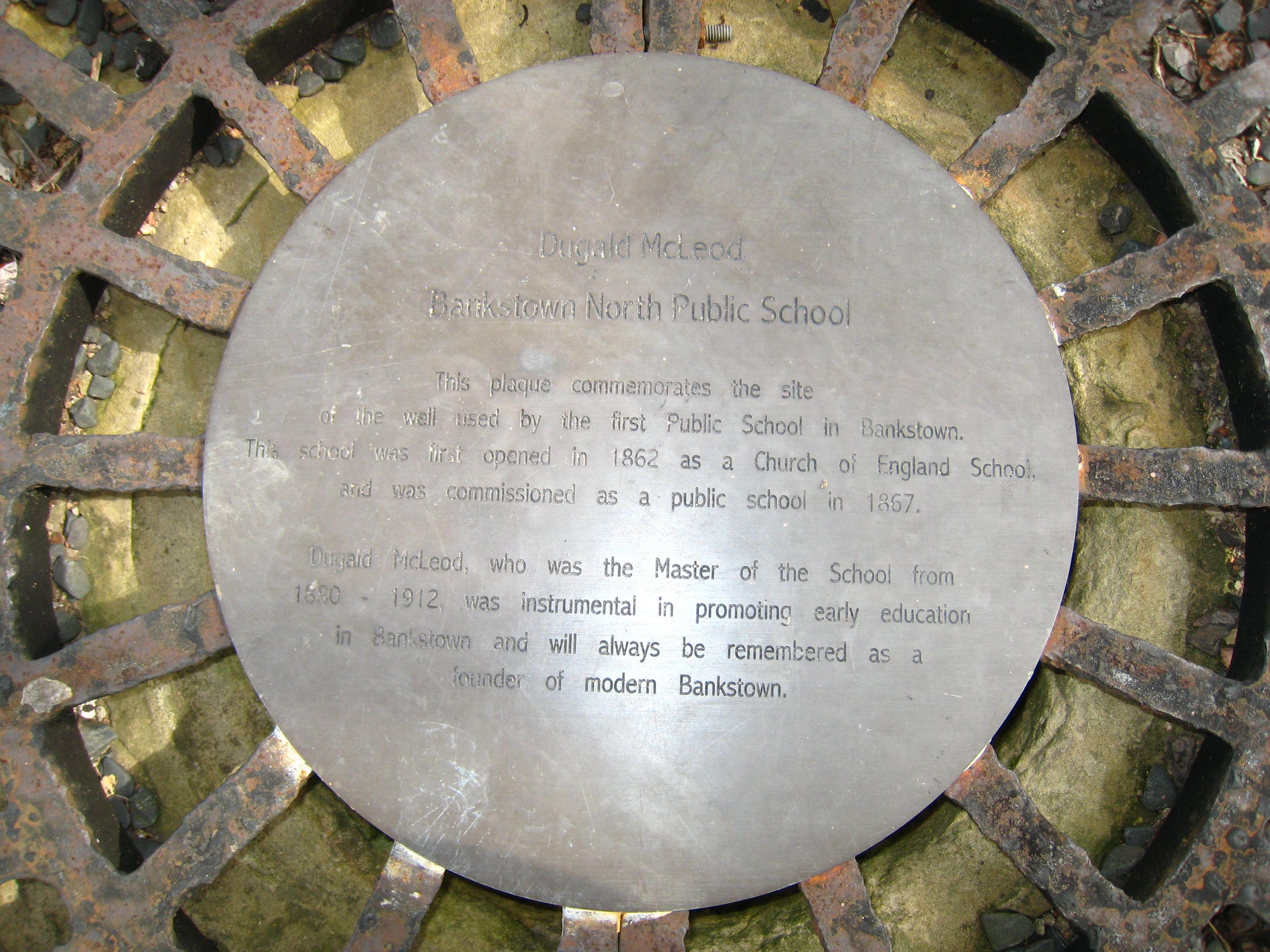
Bankstown Public School Well

McLeod Reserve is a park situated along the Hume Highway in Bankstown, New South Wales, Australia.

== Bankstown's First Public School ==
In 1862 the Church of England School was first opened and was commissioned as a public school in 1867. Bankstown's first public school was built where McLeod Reserve is currently situated in 1880. In 1882 49 boys and 36 girls were enrolled, and upkeep expenses totalled 219 pounds, eight shillings and 11 pence. The school's first headmaster was Dugald McLeod who taught at the school since its opening until 1912. The site of the well used by Bankstown Public is today commemorated by a plaque.

The school was demolished in 1924 due to the development of North Bankstown School in the same year.

== Bankstown's First Sister City ==
Bankstown signed its first international Sister City agreement with Suita, Osaka, Japan, in March 1989. In 1995 Suita donated two traditional Japanese stone lanterns to commemorate the founding of Bankstown.

In August 1999 a friendship garden was established within McLeod Reserve to symbolise Bankstown's sister city relationship with Suita.

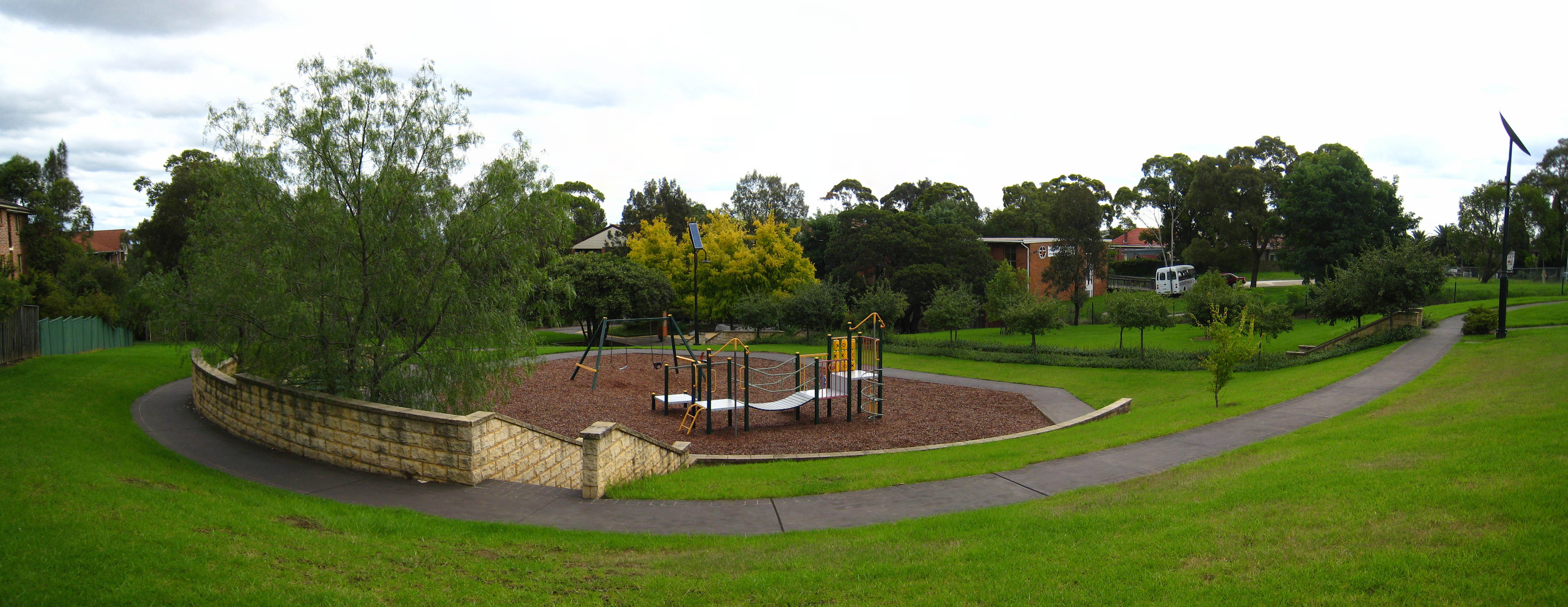
Play Equipment
