= Listen with Your Heart =

1998 song by CeCe Winans

Song by CeCe Winans

from the album Everlasting Love
- Released: March 17, 1998
- Length: 4:41
- Label: Pioneer
- Songwriter: Diane Warren

"Listen with Your Heart" is a song written by Diane Warren, and recorded by CeCe Winans for her second album Everlasting Love (1998).

== Casey Donovan version ==
"Listen with Your Heart"

Single by Casey Donovan

from the album For You
- B-side: "Nothing Else Matters" (live)
- Released: November 29, 2004
- Recorded: 2004
- Studio: Eargasm (Sydney)
- Genre: Pop
- Length: 4:03
- Label: BMG Australia; 19
- Songwriter: Diane Warren
- Producer: Bryon Jones

Casey Donovan singles chronology
"Listen with Your Heart" (2004)	"What's Going On" (2005)

In 2004, the song was chosen to be released as the winner's single of the second series of Australian Idol. The song was performed in the penultimate episode by the season's Top 2 finalists, Anthony Callea and Casey Donovan. On November 16, Donovan was announced as the winner, and the song was released on 29 November 2004. It debuted at number-one on the ARIA Charts, where it remained for two weeks. It was later included in her first album, For You (2004). The single's B-side, "Nothing Else Matters", is a live cover of the Metallica song.

=== Charts ===
==== Weekly charts ====
Chart (2004)	Peak position
Australia (ARIA)	1

==== Year-end charts ====
Chart (2004)	Position
Australia (ARIA)	25
Chart (2005)	Position
Australia (ARIA)	72

=== Certifications ===
Region	Certification	Certified units/sales
Australia (ARIA)	2× Platinum	140,000^{^}
^{^} Shipments figures based on certification alone.
