= Casey Donovan (singer) =

Australian singer (born 1988)

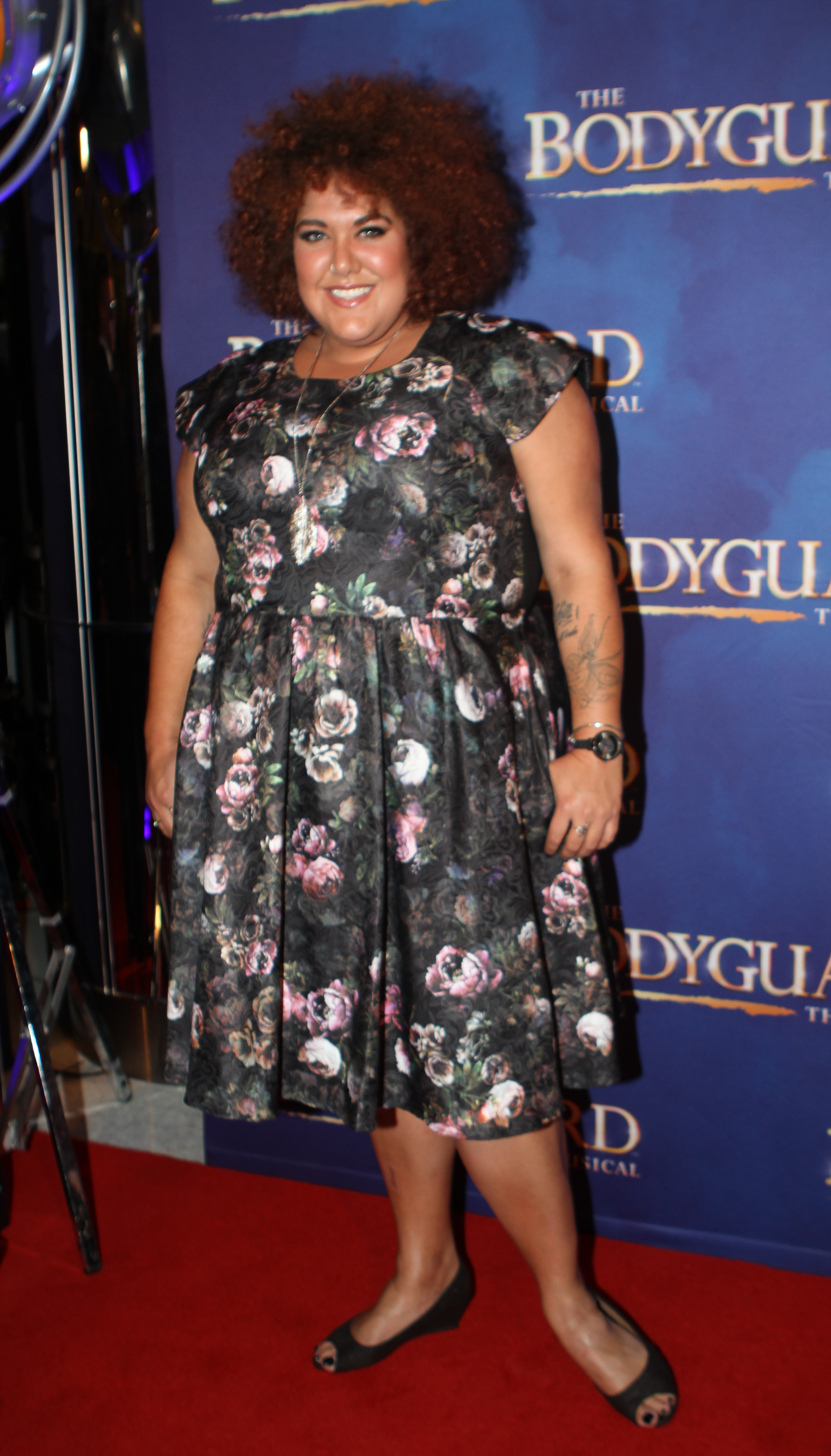
- Casey Donovan at the musical premiere of The Bodyguard in Sydney Lyric on 27 April 2017.

Background information
- Born: 13 May 1988 (age 38); Bankstown, New South Wales, Australia
- Genres: Pop; rock; folk
- Occupations: Singer; actress
- Instruments: Vocals; guitar
- Years active: 2004–present
- Labels: Sony BMG (2004–2006); Independent (2006–present)
- Partner: Renee Sharples (eng. 2024)
- Website: caseydonovan.com

Casey Donovan (born 13 May 1988) is an Indigenous Australian (Gumbaynggirr and Dungari) singer and actress, best known for winning the second season of the singing competition show Australian Idol in 2004. She won the competition at the age of 16, becoming the series' youngest winner. In 2017, Donovan won the third series of I'm a Celebrity...Get Me Out of Here. Donovan also hosted the NITV music show Fusion with Casey Donovan.

== Early life ==
Casey Donovan was born in Bankstown, New South Wales, to a family that included several relatives with musical careers, including her father, who along with his brothers are members of the country band The Donovans. It was not until attending Condell Park High that her talent became noticed and was supported especially by both her mother and stepfather.

Donovan is a Gumbaynggirr and Dungari woman.

== Career ==
=== 2004–2006: Australian Idol and For You ===
In 2004, Donovan transferred to the Australian Institute of Music in Sydney and auditioned for the second season of Australian Idol singing Kasey Chambers' "A Million Tears". During the series, Donovan won a Deadly Award for Most Promising New Talent in Music. In November, Donovan was announced the winner of Idol over favourite Anthony Callea. Her success was marred by a typographical mistake by Australian Idol sponsor Telstra, in a half-page nationally run newspaper advertisement including what was assumed to be her website. The link was a memorial for the late American pornography actor of the same name. Telstra apologized for the error.

==== Australian Idol Performances ====
Week	Theme	Song	Artist	Status
Audition	N/A	"A Million Tears"	Kasey Chambers	Selected
Theatre Round; Day 1	N/A (a cappella)	6,8,12	Brian McKnight	Advanced
Theatre Round; Day 2	Group Performance	"Signed, Sealed, Delivered I'm Yours" with Em Rusciano, Liza Schulberg and Yasmine Dia	Stevie Wonder	Advanced
Theatre Round; Day 3	Solo Performance	"Exodus"	Evanescence	Advanced
Top 30	Semi-final Group No. 3	"Here's Where I Stand" (Touchdown)	Tiffany Taylor	Advanced
Top 12	Australian-Made Music	"Symphony of Life"	Tina Arena	Safe
Top 11	Pop Music	"Don't Speak"	No Doubt	Safe
Top 10	Songs of the Sixties	"Somebody to Love"	Jefferson Airplane	Safe
Top 9	Disco Hits	"Shake Your Groove Thing"	Peaches & Herb	Safe
Top 8	Idol's Choice	"Special Ones" (Touchdown)	George	Safe
Top 7	Lennon–McCartney	"Eleanor Rigby"	The Beatles	Safe
Top 6	Songs of the Eighties	"The Flame"	Cheap Trick	Bottom 2
Top 5	Songs of R&B	"Beautiful" (Touchdown)	India.Arie	Safe
Top 4	Music of Big band	"Why Don't You Do Right?" "Come Fly with Me"	Peggy Lee; Frank Sinatra	Safe
Top 3	Songs of the Seventies	"You're So Vain"(Touchdown) "Misty Blue"	Carly Simon; Dorothy Moore	Safe
Finale	Idol's Choice; Idol's Choice; Idol Winner's Single	"Take Me as I Am" "Hello" "Listen with Your Heart"	Vanessa Amorosi; Evanescence (winner's single)	WON

In February 2005, Donovan released "What's Going On" which peaked at number 18 on the ARIA Charts. At the Deadly Awards 2005, Donovan won Single Release of the Year for "Listen with Your Heart" and Artist of the Year. At the ARIA Music Awards of 2005, Donovan was nominated for Highest Selling Single, losing to Anthony Callea's "The Prayer". In 2006, Donovan was dropped from Sony BMG.

=== 2007–2016: Post-Idol Career ===
In 2008, independently released the extended play Eye 2 Eye.

While starring in the successful concept show, Women of Soul, Donovan was approached by director Rhoda Roberts for the theatrical production of Giorgio Battistelli's opera Miracle in Brisbane, which was performed at the Brisbane Festival in October 2009.

Donovan returned to music with the release of her single "Big, Beautiful & Sexy" written with songwriter Beau Golden, released in August 2010. A Facebook named for the song grew to over 10,000 fans shortly after release. Prior to the song's release, Donovan herself lost over 20 kg and continued her support larger men and women. Donovan went on to release another single in November 2010 titled "Last Regret," which gained some commercial airplay.

In December 2010, Donovan was nominated for two awards at the 2010 Sydney Theatre Awards for "Newcomer" and "Supporting Actress", continuing to receive praise and recognition from the industry for her work in The Sapphires. Although she auditioned for a role in the 2011 movie version, Donovan was not cast.

2011 saw Donovan reprise her role of Cynthia Macrae in another tour of The Sapphires. The tour ran during February in ACT and NSW, and was followed by two weeks in the UK in March.

In August/September 2011, Donovan created the role of Mama Cass in the world premiere of new musical Flowerchildren – The Mamas & the Papas Story written by Peter Fitzpatrick and produced by Australian company Magnormos. She was joined by Matt Hetherington as John Phillips, Laura Fitzpatrick as Michelle Phillips, and Dan Humphris as Denny Doherty.

Donovan also played several roles in Shakespeare's As You Like It at Sydney's Belvoir Street Theatre.

=== 2017–2018: I'm a Celebrity, TV Advertisements and "Lonely" ===
In January 2017, Donovan was revealed as a celebrity contestant on the third season of the Australian version of I'm a Celebrity...Get Me Out of Here!. On 13 March 2017, Donovan won the series and was announced as the first ever Queen of the Jungle. In April 2017, Donovan became the face of the Coles Supermarket "Down down" campaign. On 23 April 2017, Donovan performed an acoustic version of David Bowie's "Heroes" at the 2017 Logie Awards in which she received a standing ovation. In May 2017 the Coles, "Down Down" campaign was refreshed with Casey performing a disco version of the advertisement. Donovan released her first single in seven years, "Lonely" on 19 May 2017 and Off the Grid & Somewhere in Between EP in August 2017.

She performed on New Year's Eve 2017 in Sydney, singing "Lady Marmalade", "Crazy Little Thing Called Love" and "Nutbush City Limits".

=== 2019–present: Chicago, Australia Decides, and The Space podcast ===
In 2019 Donovan starred as Mama Morton in the Australian revival of the musical, Chicago, which received positive reviews.

In November 2019, Donovan was announced as a participant in Eurovision - Australia Decides; in an attempt to represent Australia in the Eurovision Song Contest 2020. She performed the track "Proud" in the national final on 8 February 2020 and placed second.

In 2020, she became a host on The Space podcast, focused on mindfulness and wellbeing.

In 2021, Donovan appeared as Luna Keys in the third season of the comedy TV series How to Stay Married, alongside Peter Helliar and Lisa McCune.

In 2022, she returned to the stage in the Australian production of the musical 9 to Five, playing the role of Judy Bernly which toured the Capitol Theatre in Sydney, Lyric Theatre in Brisbane, State Theatre in Melbourne and Festival Theatre in Adelaide.

In 2023, it was announced that Donovan would play the role of Angelique/Nurse in the Melbourne production of & Juliet at the Regent Theatre. She then toured with the show to Singapore, Perth and Sydney.

Donovan next performed the role of Aunt Deborah in Kimberly Akimbo in 2025, receiving praise for her "scene-stealer" performance.

Donovan announced that she would be touring Australia in 2026 with a show covering her entire career, This Is Me.

== Personal life ==
From 2004, Donovan was the victim of a six-year-long hoax telephone relationship with a persona named Campbell, constructed by a woman named Olga.

In 2023, Donovan announced she was in a relationship with Renee Sharples, whom she met on a dating app during the COVID-19 lockdowns. The pair became engaged in June 2024. Donovan identifies as a queer woman. On 3 October 2026, Donovan announced that she was 22 weeks pregnant after using IVF, revealing that she had struggled with PMOS since her teenage years.

== Discography ==
=== Studio albums ===
List of albums, with selected chart positions and certifications
Title	Album details	Peak chart position	Certifications
Title	Album details	AUS	Certifications
For You	Released: 13 December 2004; Format: CD, digital download; Label: Sony Music Australia	2	ARIA: 3× Platinum

=== Extended plays ===
List of EPs, with selected details
Title	Details
Eye 2 Eye	Released: 1 January 2008; Format: CD, digital download; Label: Casey Donovan
Off the Grid & Somewhere in Between	Released: 25 August 2017; Format: CD, digital download; Label: Casey Donovan
21 Years Retrospective EP	Released: 29 August 2025; Format: digital download; Label: Casey Donovan

=== Singles ===
List of singles, with selected chart positions and certifications, showing year released and album name
Year	Title	Peak chart positions	Certifications	Album
Year	Title	AUS	Certifications	Album
2004	"Listen with Your Heart"	1	ARIA: 2× Platinum	For You
2005	"What's Going On"	18		For You
2005	"Flow"	51		For You
2010	"Big, Beautiful & Sexy"	—		Non-album singles
2010	"Last Regret"	—		Non-album singles
2017	"Lonely"	— (Note: "Lonely" did not enter the ARIA Singles Chart, but peaked at number 48 on the ARIA Digital Track Chart.)		Off the Grid & Somewhere in Between
2017	"The Villain"	—		Off the Grid & Somewhere in Between
2020	"Proud"	—		Australia Decides
2020	"You Are Not Alone" (with Adam Brand)	—		Speed of Life
2022	"Shake It"	—		
2023	"This Is Me" (live at Sydney Opera House, NYE 2022)	—		
2025	"Defying Gravity"	—		
2025	"Hallelujah"	—		
2026	"One More Dance"	—		
2026	"Daughters and Sons" (with Justine Eltakchi)	—		Big Dream Baby (Justine Eltakchi album)
— denotes releases that failed to chart.

== Television ==
Year	Title	Role	Notes
2004	Australian Idol	Contestant	Winner
2012	Fusion With Casey Donovan	Host	
2017	I'm a Celebrity...Get Me Out of Here!	Contestant	Winner
2017	Coles Supermarket Ad	Herself	
2017	Have You Been Paying Attention?	Guest quiz master	
2017	All Star Family Feud	Contestant	Team captain
2018	Hughesy, We Have a Problem	Celebrity problem	
2018	Blind Date	Contestant	
2019	Show Me the Movie!	Celebrity guest	
2019	Who Do You Think You Are?	Guest	
2019	Celebrity Name Game	Herself	2 episodes
2020	Australia Decides	Contestant	
2021	How to Stay Married	Luna Keys	Season 3, recurring
2022	Darby & Joan	Australian Sat Nav Voice	Mini-series, recurring

== Awards and nominations ==
=== ARIA Music Awards ===
Year	Nominee / work	Award	Result	Lost to
2005	For You	Highest Selling Album	Nominated	Missy Higgins – The Sound Of White
2005	"Listen with Your Heart"	Highest Selling Single	Nominated	Anthony Callea – "The Prayer"

=== Deadly Awards ===
The Deadly Awards, (commonly known simply as The Deadlys), was an annual celebration of Australian Aboriginal and Torres Strait Islander achievement in music, sport, entertainment and community. They ran from 1996 to 2013.

Year	Nominee / work	Award	Result
2004	"herself"	Most Promising New Talent in Music	Won
2005	"herself"	Artist of the Year	Won
2005	"Listen with Your Heart"	Single Release of the Year	Won

Preceded by Guy Sebastian	Australian Idol; Winner; Season 2 (2004)	Succeeded by Kate DeAraugo
