= For You (Casey Donovan album) =

Studio album by Casey Donovan
- Released: 13 December 2004 (Australia)
- Recorded: 2004
- Genre: Pop rock
- Length: 43:13
- Label: Sony BMG
- Producer: Bryon Jones, Paul Wiltshire

Casey Donovan chronology
For You (2004)	Eye 2 Eye (2007)

Singles from For You
- 1. "Listen with Your Heart" Released: 29 November 2004; 2. "What's Going On" Released: 21 February 2005; 3. "Flow" Released: 25 July 2005

For You is the debut studio album by Australian Idol series two winner Casey Donovan, produced by Bryon Jones and released on 13 December 2004 by Sony BMG.The album debuted at number two on the Australian ARIA Albums Chart. The album included the number one single "Listen with Your Heart".

== Track listing ==
No.	Title	Writer(s)	Length
1.	"Listen with Your Heart"	Diane Warren	4:02
2.	"What's Going On"	Ulric Johansson; Jessica Origliasso; Lisa Origliasso; Erik Nova	3:54
3.	"Flow"	Halima Fraval; Jimmy Harry	4:12
4.	"How Could I Fall (For That)"	Pär Åström; Anders Bagge; Robbie Nevil; Christian Svensson	3:33
5.	"Shine"	Peter Gordeno; Lindy Robbins; Reed Vertelney	4:29
6.	"Better to Love"	Phil Buckle; Richard Gonçalves; Carmen Smith	3:57
7.	"Something Beautiful"	James Hogarth; Dawn Joseph	4:06
8.	"You Believed"	Adrian and Barbara Hannan	3:27
9.	"Til I Found You"	Gonçalves; Audius Mtawarira; Smith	3:56
10.	"For You"	Casey Donovan; Bryon Jones; David Leslie; Adam Reily	4:19
11.	"Symphony of Life" (live from Australian Idol)	Tina Arena; Peter-John Vettese	3:19
Total length:			38:40

=== Notes ===
- The iTunes version replaces track 11 from "Symphony of Life" (live from Australian Idol) with "Flow" (single edit).

== Charts ==
For You debuted on the Australian ARIA Albums Chart at number two on 20 December 2004 with sales of 34,036 copies. It was kept off the top spot by Robbie Williams' album Greatest Hits

=== Weekly charts ===
Chart (2004/05)	Peak position
Australian Albums (ARIA)	2

=== Year-end charts ===
Chart (2004)	Position
Australian Albums (ARIA)	94
Chart (2005)	Position
Australian Albums (ARIA)	78

== Certifications ==
Region	Certification	Certified units/sales
Australia (ARIA)	3× Platinum	210,000^{^}
^{^} Shipments figures based on certification alone.
