= Innocent Eyes: Ten Year Anniversary Acoustic Edition =

Studio album (re-recorded) by Delta Goodrem
- Released: 29 November 2013
- Recorded: 2013; Studios 301, Sydney
- Genres: Acoustic; Pop
- Length: 59:34
- Label: Sony Music

Delta Goodrem chronology
Christmas (2012)	Innocent Eyes: Ten Year Anniversary Acoustic Edition (2013)	Wings of the Wild (2016)

Innocent Eyes: Ten Year Anniversary Acoustic Edition is an acoustic re-recorded album by Australian singer-songwriter Delta Goodrem, which was released on 29 November 2013 by Sony Music Australia. The album features fourteen tracks, all reworked, in celebration of the tenth anniversary since Goodrem released the original album, Innocent Eyes (2003), which has sold 1.2 million copies in Australia, over four million worldwide and spent twenty-nine weeks at number one on the ARIA Albums Chart. The album was recorded at Sydney's Studios 301 with Goodrem's band throughout 2013.

== Background and release ==
It's 10 years since its original release and it's just been named the best-charting album by an Australian in 30 years. It was seven-and-half months at number one—and that was really special. So basically it's in celebration of ARIA releasing these statistics. It was an incredible moment and I'm extremely proud.

— Goodrem, on releasing the album (2013)

Goodrem recorded the album in the iconic Studios 301 in Sydney on a short trip back to Australia from her home in Los Angeles in late August. Goodrem first confirmed that she would be releasing the album in an interview she did with Instyle Magazine Australia where she confirmed she would repackaging Innocent Eyes as an acoustic version set for release in November. Sony Music Australia later announced that the album would be released on 29 November 2013 in Australia by digital download and physical purchase. The physical CD contains a second disc which features videos of the creation of the album. This also features on the iTunes Deluxe Edition. The album is being released to celebrate the ten year anniversary since the original Innocent Eyes album was released, which held the number one position in Australia for twenty-nine weeks and was certified platinum fifteen times.

== Critical reception ==
Professional ratings
Review scores
Source	Rating
Renowned for Sound	4/5 stars

A day after the release of the album, RenownedForSound.com published a four-star review, which praised Goodrem by noting that "growth and maturity can be notably heard, especially through her vocals". They also stated, however, that there were some downfalls on the album, such as that "some of the songs suffer from the curse of oversinging." Some of these songs included some of her biggest hits: "Born to Try", "Not Me, Not I" and "Predictable". The article mentioned that the highlights on the album included "Lost Without You" and "Butterfly" as "these songs manage to find the right balance between the original and Delta’s vocal experimentation."

== Commercial performance ==
Innocent Eyes: Ten Year Anniversary Acoustic Edition made its debut at number twenty-two on the ARIA Albums Chart. The album also debuted at number seven on the ARIA Australian Artists Albums Chart, and at number eighteen on the ARIA Digital Albums Chart.

== Track listing ==
No.	Title	Writer(s)	Length
1.	"Born to Try"	Delta Goodrem; Audius Mtawarira	4:29
2.	"Innocent Eyes"	Goodrem; Vince Pizzinga	4:53
3.	"Not Me, Not I"	Goodrem; Kara DioGuardi; Gary Barlow; Eliot Kennedy; Jarrad Rogers	5:13
4.	"Throw It Away"	Barlow; Kennedy; Cathy Dennis	3:03
5.	"Lost Without You"	Matthew Gerrard; Bridget Benenate	4:24
6.	"Predictable"	Goodrem; DioGuardi; Rogers	3:45
7.	"Butterfly"	Barlow; Kennedy; Tim Woodcock	4:17
8.	"In My Own Time"	Goodrem	4:22
9.	"My Big Mistake"	Goodrem; Barlow; Kennedy; Woodcock	3:12
10.	"This Is Not Me"	Goodrem; Pizzinga	4:09
11.	"Running Away"	Goodrem; Barlow; Kennedy; Woodcock	4:10
12.	"A Year Ago Today"	Goodrem; Mark Holden; Paul Wiltshire	4:29
13.	"Longer"	Goodrem; Barlow; Kennedy; Woodcock	3:45
14.	"Will You Fall for Me"	Goodrem	4:19
Total length:			59:34

iTunes deluxe bonus videos
No.	Title	Length
15.	"Born to Try"	4:28
16.	"Innocent Eyes"	4:52
17.	"Not Me, Not I"	5:11
18.	"Throw It Away"	3:03
19.	"Lost Without You"	4:22
20.	"Predictable"	3:44
21.	"Butterfly"	4:15
22.	"In My Own Time"	4:20
23.	"My Big Mistake"	3:10
24.	"This Is Not Me"	4:06
25.	"Running Away"	4:08
26.	"A Year Ago Today"	4:24
27.	"Longer"	3:42
28.	"Will You Fall for Me"	4:17

Deluxe edition DVD
No.	Title	Length
1.	"The Making of Innocent Eyes: Ten Year Anniversary Acoustic Edition"

== Charts ==
Chart (2013)	Peak position
Australian Albums (ARIA)	22

== Release history ==
Region	Date	Label	Format	Edition(s)	Catalogue
Australia	29 November 2013	Sony Music	CD; digital download	Standard; deluxe	88883733902
United Kingdom	29 November 2013	Sony Music	Digital download	Standard; deluxe	B00GNRS452
