= List of awards and nominations received by Delta Goodrem =

Delta Goodrem awards and nominations
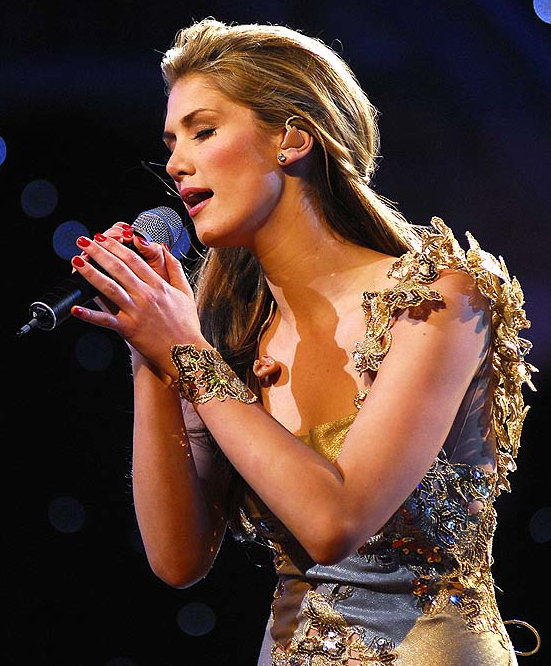
- Goodrem performing at Carols by Candlelight in Melbourne, Australia, 2006
Awards and nominations
Award	Wins	Nominations
Annual Australian DVD Awards	1	1
ARIA Music Awards	9	26
ARIA No.1 Awards	14	14
APRA Awards	1	6
Channel [V] Awards	1	4
Logie Awards	1	3
Mo Awards	1	1
MTV Video Music Awards	1	1
MTV Australia Video Music Awards	3	5
Nickelodeon Australian Kids' Choice Awards	2	4
Video Hits	1	1
World Music Awards	3	3

Totals (Note: Certain award groups do not simply award one winner. They acknowledge several different recipients, have runners-up, and have third place. Since this is a specific recognition and is different from losing an award, runner-up mentions are considered wins in this award tally. For simplification and to avoid errors, each award in this list has been presumed to have had a prior nomination.)
- Wins: 39
- Nominations: 64

Delta Goodrem is an Australian recording artist, who first became famous for her role as Nina Tucker on Neighbours. She was signed to Sony Music Australia from the age of 15. Goodrem has released five studio albums, Innocent Eyes (2003), Mistaken Identity (2004), Delta (2007),Child of the Universe (2012), and "Wings of the Wild" (2016).

Goodrem has won and been nominated for numerous awards. They include the APRA Award, ARIA Music Award, MTV Australia Award and the Nickelodeon Australian Kids' Choice Awards.

== Order of Australia ==
In 2022, Goodrem was appointed a Member of the Order of Australia (AM) in the 2022 Australia Day Honours for "significant service to the not-for-profit sector, and to the performing arts".

== Annual Australian DVD Awards ==
Goodrem won this award once in 2004.

Year	Nominee / work	Award	Result
2004	"Delta"	Best Music DVD	Won

== ARIA Awards ==
=== ARIA Music Awards ===
The ARIA Music Awards are a set of annual awards ceremonies sponsored by Australian Recording Industry Association (ARIA), which recognise excellence, innovation, and achievement across all genres of Australian music. Goodrem has won nine awards from twenty-six nominations.

Year	Nominee / work	Award	Result
2003	Innocent Eyes	Best Female Artist	Won
2003	"Born to Try"	Single of the Year	Won
2003	"Born to Try"	Breakthrough Artist - Single	Won
2003	Innocent Eyes	Breakthrough Artist - Album	Won
2003	Innocent Eyes	Best Pop Release	Won
2003	"Born to Try"	Highest Selling Single	Won
2003	"Lost Without You"	Highest Selling Single	Nominated
2003	"Innocent Eyes"	Highest Selling Single	Nominated
2003	Innocent Eyes	Highest Selling Album	Won
2003	Innocent Eyes	Album of the Year	Nominated
2003	David Nicholas – Innocent Eyes	Producer of the Year	Nominated
2003	Vince Pizzinga – "Will You Fall for Me"	Engineer of the Year	Nominated
2003	Jenny Sullivan of Sony Music Design – Innocent Eyes	Best Cover Art	Nominated
2004	Innocent Eyes	Highest Selling Album	Won
2004	"Not Me, Not I"	Best Pop Release	Nominated
2004	"Not Me, Not I"	Best Female Artist	Nominated
2004	"Predictable"	Highest Selling Single	Nominated
2005	"Almost Here"	Highest Selling Single	Nominated
2005	Mistaken Identity	Highest Selling Album	Nominated
2008	"In This Life"	Highest Selling Single	Nominated
2008	Delta	Highest Selling Album	Won
2012	"Sitting on Top of the World"	Song of the Year	Nominated
2015	Anthony Rose - "Wings"	Best Video	Nominated
2016	Kristen Doyle – Wings of the Wild	Best Cover Art	Nominated
2016	Anthony Rose – "Dear Life"	Best Video	Nominated
2016	Wings of the Wild	Best Female Artist	Nominated

=== ARIA No. 1 Awards ===
The ARIA No. 1 Chart Awards are given to Australian recording artists who have achieved a number-one single or album on the ARIA Charts. Goodrem has won 14 of these awards.

Year	Nominee / work	Award	Result
2003	Innocent Eyes	Gaining No. 1 position on the ARIA album charts	Won
2003	"Born to Try"	Gaining No. 1 position on the ARIA single charts	Won
2003	"Lost Without You"	Gaining No. 1 position on the ARIA single charts	Won
2003	"Innocent Eyes"	Gaining No. 1 position on the ARIA single charts	Won
2004	Innocent Eyes	Gaining No. 1 position on the ARIA album charts	Won
2004	"Not Me, Not I"	Gaining No. 1 position on the ARIA single charts	Won
2004	"Predictable"	Gaining No. 1 position on the ARIA single charts	Won
2005	Mistaken Identity	Gaining No. 1 position on the ARIA album charts	Won
2005	"Out of the Blue"	Gaining No. 1 position on the ARIA single charts	Won
2005	"Almost Here"	Gaining No. 1 position on the ARIA single charts	Won
2007	"In This Life"	Gaining No. 1 position on the ARIA single charts	Won
2007	Delta	Gaining No. 1 position on the ARIA album charts	Won
2010	Believe Again: Australian Tour 2009	Gaining No. 1 position on the ARIA DVD charts	Won
2015	"Wings"	Gaining No. 1 position on the ARIA single charts	Won
2016	Wings of the Wild	Gaining No. 1 position on the ARIA album charts	Won
2021	Bridge over Troubled Dreams	Gaining No. 1 position on the ARIA album charts	Won

== APRA Awards ==
The APRA Awards are presented annually from 1982 by the Australasian Performing Right Association (APRA).

Year	Nominee / work	Award	Result
2004	Herself	Breakthrough Award	Won
2004	"Innocent Eyes"	Song of the Year	Nominated
2004	"Born to Try"	Most Performed Australian Work	Nominated
2004	"Innocent Eyes"	Most Performed Australian Work	Nominated
2005	"Predictable"	Most Performed Australian Work	Nominated
2013	"Sitting on Top of the World"	Pop Work of the Year	Nominated
2013	"Sitting on Top of the World"	Most Played Australian Work	Nominated
2013	"Wish You Were Here"	Song of the Year	Shortlisted

== Channel [V] Awards ==
The [V] Oz Artist of the Year award is presented annually by Channel V Australia. Channel V choose the original nominees, with public vote deciding the final ten, final four and overall winner.

Year	Nominee / work	Award	Result
2003	Herself	[V] Oz Artist of the Year	Won
2004	Herself	[V] Oz Artist of the Year	Nominated
2012	Herself	[V] Oz Artist of the Year	Nominated
2013	Herself	[V] Oz Artist of the Year	Nominated

== Helpmann Awards ==
The Helpmann Awards is an awards show, celebrating live entertainment and performing arts in Australia, presented by industry group Live Performance Australia since 2001. Note: 2020 and 2021 were cancelled due to the COVID-19 pandemic.

Year	Nominee / work	Award	Result	Ref.
2006	Delta Goodrem: The Visualise Tour 2005	Best Performance in an Australian Contemporary Concert	Nominated	

== Logie Awards ==
The TV Week Logie Awards are the Australian television industry awards, which have been presented annually since 1959. Goodrem has been nominated for three Logies winning once.

Year	Nominee / work	Award	Result
2003	Nina Tucker (Neighbours)	Silver Logie for Most Popular New Talent	Won
2004	Nina Tucker (Neighbours)	Silver Logie for Most Popular Actress	Nominated
2004	Herself	Gold Logie for Most Popular Personality on Australian Television	Nominated

== Marcel Bezençon Awards ==
The Marcel Bezençon Awards honouring the best competing songs in the Eurovision Song Contest final.

Year	Nominee / work	Award	Result
2026	"Eclipse"	Media Award	Won

== Mo Awards ==
The Mo Awards are long-running annual Australian entertainment industry awards. They recognise achievements in live entertainment in Australia. Goodrem has won one award.

Year	Nominee / work	Award	Result
2003	Herself	Australian Performer of the Year	Won

== MTV Video Music Awards ==
Year	Nominee / work	Award	Result
2003	"Born to Try"	International Viewers' Choice Award	Won

== MTV Australia Video Music Awards ==
The MTV Australia Awards is an awards ceremony presented by channel MTV Australia to honour the best music videos of both local and international acts. Goodrem has won three awards from five nominations.

Year	Nominee / work	Award	Result
2005	Herself	Best Female Artist	Won
2005	Herself	Pepsi Viewers Choice Award	Won
2005	Mistaken Identity"	Best Pop Video	Nominated
2005	"Out of the Blue"	Best Dressed video	Nominated
2008	"Believe Again"	Music Video of the Year	Won

== Nickelodeon Australian Kids' Choice Awards ==
The Nickelodeon Australian Kids' Choice Awards is an annual awards show that honours the year's biggest television, movie and music acts, as voted by the public. Goodrem has won one awards from three nominations.

Year	Nominee / work	Award	Result
2004	Herself	Favorite Music Act	Won
2008	Herself	Fave Aussie	Nominated
2008	Herself	Fave Female Singer	Nominated
2017	Herself	Fave Aussie	Won

=== Rolling Stone Australia Awards ===
The Rolling Stone Australia Awards are awarded annually in January or February by the Australian edition of Rolling Stone magazine for outstanding contributions to popular culture in the previous year.

Year	Nominee / work	Award	Result	Ref.
2025	Delta Goodrem	Rolling Stone Readers Award	Shortlisted	

== Video Hits ==
Year	Nominee / work	Award	Result
2003	"Born to Try"	Video of the Year	Won

== World Music Awards ==
The World Music Awards is an international awards show founded in 1989. Awards are presented to the World's best-selling Artists in the various categories and to the best-selling Artists from each major territory. Goodrem won the Highest Selling Australian Artist award in 2004, 2005 and 2008.

Year	Nominee / work	Award	Result
2004	Herself	Highest Selling Australian Artist	Won
2005	Herself	Highest Selling Australian Artist	Won
2008	Herself	Highest Selling Australian Artist	Won
