= The Visualise Tour =

2005 Australian concert tour

- Tour by Delta Goodrem
- Associated album: Innocent Eyes; Mistaken Identity
- Start date: 3 July 2005
- End date: 27 July 2005
- Legs: 1
- No. of shows: 10

Delta Goodrem concert chronology
- The Visualise Tour (2005); Believe Again Tour (2009)

The Visualise Tour is the debut concert tour by Australian singer-songwriter Delta Goodrem, in support of her first two studio albums, Innocent Eyes (2003) and Mistaken Identity (2004). During the success of her debut album Innocent Eyes, Goodrem was unable to tour due to her cancer diagnosis in July 2003. Following a period of recovery and the release of her second studio album Mistaken Identity, she began preparing her debut tour.

During July 2005, Goodrem performed a total of ten shows to an audience of 80,000 people and became the first Australian artist to headline a show at Sydney SuperDome. Canadian singer, Kyle Riabko, served as support act for the tour and Goodrem's partner at the time, Brian McFadden, joined her for their duet "Almost Here".

The tour was released on DVD in November 2005, titled The Visualise Tour: Live in Concert.

== Set list ==
1. "Butterfly"
2. "Mistaken Identity"
3. "Lost Without You"
4. "A Little Too Late"
5. "Not Me, Not I"
6. "Will You Fall for Me"
7. "The Analyst"
8. "Throw It Away" (interlude)
9. "Predictable"
10. "Longer"
11. "Electric Storm"
12. "Born to Try"
13. "Last Night on Earth"
14. "Fragile"
15. "Almost Here" (with Brian McFadden)
16. "Flying Without Wings" (with Brian McFadden)^{[A]}
17. "Miscommunication" (interlude)
18. "I Feel the Earth Move"
19. "I Don't Care"
20. "Are You Gonna Be My Girl"
21. "A Year Ago Today" (interlude)
22. "Extraordinary Day"
23. "Be Strong"
24. "Out of the Blue"
25. "Innocent Eyes"

Notes:

- A Performed at select shows only.

== Tour dates ==
List of concerts
Date	City	Country	Venue
3 July 2005	Newcastle	Australia	Newcastle Entertainment Centre
8 July 2005	Perth	Australia	Burswood Dome
10 July 2005	Adelaide	Australia	Adelaide Entertainment Centre
13 July 2005	Melbourne	Australia	Rod Laver Arena
16 July 2005	Melbourne	Australia	Rod Laver Arena
18 July 2005	Brisbane	Australia	Brisbane Entertainment Centre
21 July 2005	Canberra	Australia	AIS Arena
23 July 2005	Sydney	Australia	Sydney SuperDome
24 July 2005	Sydney	Australia	Sydney SuperDome
27 July 2005	Hobart	Australia	Derwent Entertainment Centre

== The Visualise Tour: Live in Concert ==
The Visualise Tour: Live in Concert

Video by Delta Goodrem
- Released: 13 November 2005
- Genre: Pop
- Length: 150 mins
- Labels: Sony BMG (#82876727009)
- Director: Dennis Murphy
- Producer: Richard Sanford

Delta Goodrem chronology
Delta (2003)	The Visualise Tour: Live in Concert (2005)	Believe Again: Australian Tour 2009 (2009)

Goodrem's shows at Sydney Superdome were filmed for the DVD release, titled The Visualise Tour: Live in Concert. Released through Sony BMG on November 13, 2005, it debuted at number 1 on the Australian music DVD charts and was certified four times platinum.

=== Special features ===
- Tour documentary
- Concert videos:
1. "The Analyst"
2. "Here I Am" (montage)
3. "A Year Ago Today" (extended montage)
- "Be Strong" (music video)
- Photo gallery

=== Charts ===
==== Weekly charts ====
Chart (2005)	Peak position
Australian ARIA DVD Chart	1

==== Year-end charts ====
Chart (2005)	Peak position
Australian ARIA DVD Chart	14
Chart (2006)	Peak position
Australian ARIA DVD Chart	46

=== Certifications ===
Region	Certification	Certified units/sales
Australia (ARIA)	4× Platinum	60,000^{^}
^{^} Shipments figures based on certification alone.

== Personnel ==
Adapted from the tour programme credits.

- Tour producer, promoter – Paul Dainty
- Tour directors – Andy Mackrill, Luke Hede
- Tour manager – Peter McCrindle
- Musical director – Richard Sanford
- Choreographers – Shannon Holtzapffel, Simon Lind (Project Moda)
- Keyboard, guitar and backing vocals – Richard Sanford
- Bass – Michael Di Francesco
- Drums and percussion – Alex Carapetis
- Keyboards and backing vocals – Scott Aplin
- Guitar and backing vocals – Andrew Keppie
- Backing vocalists – Natasha Stuart, Conchita Wilden, Asli Ozdogan
- Dancers – Richard O'Brien, Simon Lind, Troy Phillips, Shannon Holtzapffel
- Fairy princesses – Chelsea Windon, Jenna Schijf
