= Delta (Delta Goodrem video) =

Video by Delta Goodrem
- Released: 13 October 2003 (Australia)
- Genre: Pop
- Length: 126 minutes
- Labels: Sony Music Entertainment (#202227.9)

Delta Goodrem chronology
Delta (2003)	The Visualise Tour: Live in Concert (2005)

Delta is a DVD by Australian singer-songwriter Delta Goodrem. It was released on 13 October 2003 through Sony. In some international markets it was titled Innocent Eyes. The DVD features a collection of highlights documenting the Innocent Eyes era. It spent eight weeks at #1 and has become the highest selling music DVD in Australia by an Australian artist, being certified platinum twelve times. It was awarded "Best Music DVD" at the 3rd Annual Australian DVD Awards.

== Track listing ==
Live performances

1. "Will You Fall For Me" (Channel [V] HQ)
2. "Not Me, Not I" (Channel [V] HQ)
3. "Born to Try" (Channel [V] HQ)^{[A]}
4. "Throw It Away" (Channel [V] HQ)
5. "Predictable" (Channel [V] HQ)
6. "Lost Without You" (Channel [V] HQ)
7. "Innocent Eyes" (Channel [V] HQ)
8. "Butterfly" (Channel [V] HQ)
9. London Showcase (January 2003)
10. "Born to Try" (Channel 7 Bali Appeal)^{[A]}
11. "Not Me, Not I' (Channel [V] Music Bus - Luna Park Melbourne)^{[A]}
12. "Born to Try" (Celebrate - Christmas in the Capital)

Music videos

1. "Born to Try"
2. "Lost Without You"
3. "Innocent Eyes"
4. "Not Me, Not I"
5. "A Year Ago Today"^{[B]}
6. "I Don't Care"

Behind the scenes

1. "Born to Try"
2. "Lost Without You"
3. "Innocent Eyes"
4. "Not Me, Not I"
5. London (January 2003)
6. Europe (May 2003)
7. Live at Channel [V] HQ
8. Photo shoots

Growing up

1. Performing
2. Sport

Extras

1. EPK
2. Outtakes
3. Photo gallery

Notes

- A Not featured on international release.
- B Previously unreleased.

== Charts ==
=== Weekly charts ===
Chart (2003)	Peak position
Australian ARIA DVD Chart	1
New Zealand RIANZ DVD Chart	1

=== Year-end charts ===
Chart (2003)	Position
Australian ARIA DVD Chart	1
Chart (2004)	Position
Australian ARIA DVD Chart	2

== Certifications ==
Region	Certification	Certified units/sales
Australia (ARIA)	12× Platinum	180,000^{^}
^{^} Shipments figures based on certification alone.
