= Innocent Eyes (2003 Delta Goodrem album) =

Studio album by Delta Goodrem
- Released: 24 March 2003
- Recorded: 2001–2003
- Studios: Cove City Sound Studios (Long Island, New York, USA); Conway Studios (Hollywood, California, USA); Mansfield Lodge (Los Angeles, California, USA); The Lab (Santa Monica, California, USA); Metropolis Audio and Sing Sing Studios (Melbourne, Australia); 301 Studio and Mangrove Studios (Sydney, Australia); True North Studios (Cheshire, England, UK); Olympic Studios (London, England, UK)
- Genres: Pop; pop rock; adult contemporary
- Length: 56:06
- Labels: Epic; Daylight
- Producers: Gary Barlow; John Fields; Matthew Gerrard; Delta Goodrem; Eliot Kennedy; David Nicholas; Ric Wake

Delta Goodrem chronology
Innocent Eyes (2003)	Mistaken Identity (2004)

Singles from Innocent Eyes
- 1. "Born to Try" Released: 11 November 2002; 2. "Lost Without You" Released: 3 March 2003; 3. "Innocent Eyes" Released: 9 June 2003; 4. "Not Me, Not I" Released: 15 September 2003; 5. "Predictable" Released: 1 December 2003

Innocent Eyes is the debut studio album by Australian singer Delta Goodrem, released in Australia on 24 March 2003. It was later released in the United Kingdom on 30 June 2003. Goodrem co-wrote most of the material, excluding "Throw It Away", "Lost Without You" and "Butterfly". The album features two self-penned songs, "In My Own Time" and "Will You Fall for Me". Goodrem worked with writers and producers such as Audius Mtawarira, Bridget Benenate, Cathy Dennis, Eliot Kennedy, Gary Barlow, Jarrad Rogers, Kara DioGuardi, and Vince Pizzinga to create the album with a collection of piano-based pop and ballad tracks.

Five singles were released from the album. Its lead single "Born to Try" was released in November 2002 and became a massive commercial success, peaking atop the ARIA Singles Chart and the New Zealand Singles Chart, becoming Goodrem's most successful single to date. Follow-up singles "Lost Without You", "Innocent Eyes", "Not Me, Not I" and "Predictable" also all reached number one on the ARIA Singles Chart. Goodrem became the first artist to have five number-one singles from a debut album. The first three singles charted within the top 10 in the United Kingdom. After having cancer and releasing a second album and then to promote the album, Goodrem embarked on The Visualise Tour in 2005.

Innocent Eyes debuted at number one on the Australian Albums Chart, making it her first number-one album. Altogether it sold 4.5 million copies worldwide including 1.2 million in Australia alone. Innocent Eyes is the most successful album in Australia in 19 years. It was the highest-selling album in Australia of the decade and is the second-best-selling Australian album of all time.

She celebrated the 10 year anniversary with a special acoustic edition in 2013 called Innocent Eyes: Ten Year Anniversary Acoustic Edition and gave it its own tour in 2023 to celebrate its 20th anniversary.

== Background ==
In September 2000, Goodrem signed to Sony Music and an album which she planned to release with independent label Empire Records was shelved. A year later, Goodrem released her debut single "I Don't Care" which peaked at number 64 on the ARIA Singles Chart.

Soon after, Goodrem began working on Innocent Eyes. She worked with a range of producers and songwriters, including the True North production and songwriting team: Gary Barlow, Eliot Kennedy (Spice Girls), Ric Wake (Celine Dion, Taylor Dayne, Jennifer Lopez, Mariah Carey), Kara DioGuardi (Kelly Clarkson, Christina Aguilera, Avril Lavigne, Hilary Duff), Matthew Gerrard (Mandy Moore, BBMak), Vince Pizzinga (Midnight Oil, Danielle Spencer), David Nicholas (INXS, Elton John, George) and Mark Holden. Innocent Eyes is a Pop, pop rock and adult contemporary album which uses mostly live instruments. Talking about the album, Goodrem said: "I wanted to make an album that reflected me at this time in my life", "Every song takes me to a place where I can remember what happened." She also said: "The album is almost like a diary I have been keeping over the last two years", "Every track has a meaning behind it that's personal to me. I have been looking forward to this day for a long time and I just hope that everyone likes the music as much as I loved making it."

== Lawsuit ==
In 2004, Goodrem had been accused of owing thousands of dollars to songwriter Mark Holden. Holden wanted to clear up the terms of his contract with Goodrem and her record label Sony and requested all consultancy fees owed to him under the agreement.

== Critical reception ==
Professional ratings
Review scores
Source	Rating
AllMusic	4/5 stars
The Guardian	3/5 stars
MTV Asia	6/10

Innocent Eyes received mostly positive reviews from music critics. Matthew Chisling from AllMusic described Goodrem's presence in the music industry as a "refreshing change". He also said that, "Innocent Eyes reflects a mature yet clean display of true vocal talent". Caroline Sullivan, writing for The Guardian, said that "Goodrem sings her aspirational ballads with heartfelt candour, while her co-writer's credit on nearly every song seems to be more than affectation. The lyrics are a bit la-la-floating-on-clouds, but that doesn't dilute their charm".

== Singles ==
"Born to Try" was the first song from the album released in Australia on 11 November 2002, just a few days after Goodrem's eighteenth birthday. At the time of its release, Goodrem was performing the song on the Australian soap opera Neighbours, as singer Nina Tucker. The song debuted on the Australian Singles Chart on 18 November 2002 at number three. On its second week the song jumped to number two and was accredited platinum by ARIA, by its third week the song had knocked "The Ketchup Song" by Las Ketchup off the top spot and became Goodrem's first number-one single. The song eventually went on to certify triple platinum, becoming the fourth highest-selling single in Australia for 2003. It won three ARIA Awards for Breakthrough Artist – Single, Highest Selling Single and Single of the Year. "Born to Try" also went number-one in New Zealand and Slovenia, top ten in the UK, and top twenty in Ireland and the Netherlands.

"Lost Without You" was the second song released from the album. Released to radio on 14 February 2003, it became the most added song to radio for that week. It was released as a CD single on 3 March 2003 in Australia. The song gave Goodrem her second number one single in Australia on 10 March 2003 debuting at number one. The song eventually went on to certify double platinum, becoming the seventh highest selling single in Australia for 2003. It was nominated for one ARIA Award for Highest Selling Single but lost to herself with "Born to Try". "Lost Without You" also went top ten in New Zealand, Spain and the UK, and became the first of her four Number One singles in Sweden.

On 17 April 2003 it was announced that the third song released from the album was "Innocent Eyes" which was released as a CD single on 9 June 2003. The song debuted on Australian Singles Chart the charts at number two on 16 June 2003, behind "Bring Me to Life" by Evanescence, and was accredited gold. After three weeks in the charts it moved one spot up the charts and became Goodrem's third number-one hit single in Australia. The song went to certify platinum by ARIA, becoming the eighteenth highest selling single in Australia for 2003. It was nominated for one ARIA Award for Highest Selling Single but again lost to herself with Born to Try. "Innocent Eyes" also went top ten in the UK, top twenty in New Zealand and topped the chart in Israel.

"Not Me, Not I" was the fourth song released from the album in Australia on 15 September 2003. The song's music video was directed by Michael Spiccia and was filmed in August 2003. Goodrem was determined to film the music video and to have it completed before she started her second round of chemotherapy for Hodgkin's lymphoma because she said the song is her favourite from the album. The song made its debut on the Australian Singles Chart at number two behind Dido's "White Flag". Ond on its second week it went to number-one, making it Goodrem's fourth number-one single, breaking Kylie Minogue's record of having the most songs released from an album to reach number-one. The single also made history when it topped the chart in Malta, making Goodrem the first Australian artist to have a Number One record (either album or single) in that country.

"Predictable" was the fifth song released from the album and was released as a double A-side with her version of the John Lennon Christmas song "Happy Xmas (War Is Over)". It saw the release to radio on 25 November 2003 and topped the airplay charts, and when it saw its physical release, it became her fifth number-one single.

== Tours ==
=== The Visualise Tour ===
During the initial release and promotion of Innocent Eyes, Goodrem was unable to tour due to her cancer diagnosis in July 2003. Following a period of recovery and the release of her second studio album Mistaken Identity (2004), she began preparing her debut tour which would showcase both albums. During July 2005, Goodrem embarked on The Visualise Tour, performing a total of ten shows to an audience of 80,000 people. The set list incorporated ten songs from Innocent Eyes.

=== Innocent Eyes 20th Anniversary Tour ===
Innocent Eyes 20th Anniversary Tour
- Tour by Delta Goodrem
- Associated album: Innocent Eyes
- Start date: 23 September 2023
- End date: 7 October 2023
- Legs: 1
- No. of shows: 9

Delta Goodrem concert chronology
- Hearts on the Run Tour (2023); Innocent Eyes 20th Anniversary Tour (2023); Mistaken Identity – A Night of Celebration (2005)

In September 2023, to celebrate the 20 year anniversary of Innocent Eyes, Goodrem embarked on a retrospective tour in theatres across Australia. She performed the album in its entirety and original sequence, in addition to a medley of songs which followed Innocent Eyes, and her 2023 single "Back to Your Heart". The tour was a sell out, with additional shows added.

==== Set list ====
1. "Born to Try"
2. "Innocent Eyes"
3. "Not Me, Not I"
4. "Not Me, Not I" (demo version)
5. "Throw It Away"
6. "Lost Without You"
7. "Predictable"
8. "Butterfly"
9. "In My Own Time"
10. "My Big Mistake"
11. "This Is Not Me"
12. "Running Away"
13. "A Year Ago Today"
14. "Longer"
15. "Will You Fall for Me"
16. "Together We Are One" (interlude)
17. Medley: "Out of the Blue" / "Almost Here" / "In This Life" / "Believe Again" / "Sitting on Top of the World" / "Wings" / "Enough" / "The Power"
18. "Back to Your Heart"
19. "Here I Am"
20. "Born to Try" (reprise)

==== Tour dates ====
List of concerts
Date	City	Country	Venue
23 September 2023	Sydney	Australia	Sydney Coliseum Theatre
25 September 2023	Sydney	Australia	Sydney Opera House
26 September 2023	Sydney	Australia	Sydney Opera House
28 September 2023	Melbourne	Australia	Hamer Hall
29 September 2023	Melbourne	Australia	Hamer Hall
1 October 2023	Adelaide	Australia	Adelaide Festival Centre
3 October 2023	Brisbane	Australia	Queensland Performing Arts Centre
4 October 2023	Brisbane	Australia	Queensland Performing Arts Centre
7 October 2023	Perth	Australia	Riverside Theatre

== Commercial performance ==
Innocent Eyes debuted at number one on the Australian ARIA Albums Charts on 31 March 2003 with sales of over 70,000 copies, accrediting platinum and knocking Norah Jones's album Come Away with Me from the top spot. The album went on to spend twenty-nine weeks at number one. This broke John Farnham's record of twenty-five weeks at number one with Whispering Jack (1986). Innocent Eyes was then tied with Neil Diamond's album Hot August Night (1972) for spending the most weeks at number one in Australian history. Its accreditation reached to fourteen times platinum. The album became the highest-selling album in Australia for 2003, spent eighty-seven weeks in the top one hundred, and won six ARIA Awards for Highest Selling Album, Best Female Artist, Breakthrough Artist – Album, Best Pop Release and Channel V's Oz Artist of the Year. In 2004 the album again won the award for Highest Selling Album. It went to sell over a million copies in Australia. In the UK, the album debuted on the charts at number two behind Beyoncé's album Dangerously in Love (2003). It spent thirty-one weeks in the top seventy-five, and became the eighteenth highest-selling album for 2003. Innocent Eyes is the second highest- selling album by an Australian female singer in the 2000s, behind Kylie Minogue's album Fever which sold over six million copies worldwide.

On 23 December 2003 it was announced that the one millionth copy of the album had been released to retail, the disc was specially marked by Sony and the buyer would receive a plaque commemorating the milestone. On 7 January 2010, Innocent Eyes was announced as Australia's top-selling album for the 2000s, for which Goodrem received a special award at the 2010 ARIA No. 1 Awards in Sydney on 22 July 2010.

== Track listing ==
No.	Title	Writer(s)	Producer(s)	Length
1.	"Born to Try"	Delta Goodrem, Audius Mtawarira	Ric Wake	4:13
2.	"Innocent Eyes"	Goodrem, Vince Pizzinga	John Fields	3:53
3.	"Not Me, Not I"	Goodrem, Kara DioGuardi, Gary Barlow, Eliot Kennedy, Jarrad Rogers	Gary Barlow, Eliot Kennedy	4:25
4.	"Throw It Away"	Barlow, Kennedy, Cathy Dennis	Barlow, Kennedy	3:52
5.	"Lost Without You"	Matthew Gerrard, Bridget Benenate	Matthew Gerrard	4:10
6.	"Predictable"	Goodrem, DioGuardi, Rogers	Fields	3:40
7.	"Butterfly"	Barlow, Kennedy, Tim Woodcock	Barlow, Kennedy	4:00
8.	"In My Own Time"	Goodrem	David Nicholas	4:06
9.	"My Big Mistake"	Goodrem, Barlow, Kennedy, Woodcock	Barlow, Kennedy	3:44
10.	"This Is Not Me"	Goodrem, Pizzinga	Nicholas	4:29
11.	"Running Away"	Goodrem, Barlow, Kennedy, Woodcock	Barlow, Kennedy	3:21
12.	"A Year Ago Today"	Goodrem, Mark Holden, Paul Wiltshire	Nicholas	4:13
13.	"Longer"	Goodrem, Barlow, Kennedy, Woodcock	Barlow, Kennedy	3:53
14.	"Will You Fall for Me"	Goodrem	Goodrem	3:59
Total length:				56:06

Limited Edition DVD
No.	Title	Length
1.	"Born to Try" (Music video)
2.	"Lost Without You" (Music video)
3.	"Born to Try" (Live)
4.	"Born to Try" (Behind the Scenes)
5.	"Lost Without You" (Behind the Scenes)
6.	"Delta in London" (Behind the Scenes)

== Personnel ==
- Delta Goodrem – vocals, acoustic piano (2, 6, 14), backing vocals (4, 7, 9, 11, 13)
- Richard Sanford – acoustic piano (1)
- Russ DeSalvo – synthesizers (1), guitars (1)
- David Falzone – acoustic piano (2, 6)
- John Fields – keyboards (2, 6), guitars (2, 6), bass (2, 6), string arrangements (2, 6)
- Gary Barlow – keyboards (3, 4, 7, 9, 11, 13), programming (3, 4, 7, 9, 11, 13)
- Matthew Gerrard – programming (5), all instruments (5)
- Matt Mahaffey – keyboards (6), noises (6)
- Stuart Hunter – keyboards (8, 10, 12)
- Justin Tressider – programming (8, 10, 12)
- Mike Ruekberg – baritone guitar (2)
- Phil Solem – guitars (2, 6)
- Eliot Kennedy – guitars (3, 4, 9, 11, 13), keyboards (7, 9, 11), programming (7, 9, 11), backing vocals (7, 11, 13), bass (11)
- Steve Mackay – guitars (7, 9)
- Tim Henwood – guitars (8)
- Mark Punch – guitars (10, 12)
- Patrick Carroll – bass programming (1), percussion programming (1)
- Jeremy Meek – bass (7, 13)
- Samuel Dixon – bass (8, 10, 12)
- Frank Vilardi – drums (1)
- Dorian Crozier – drums (2, 6)
- Spectrasonics "Back Beat" – drum samples (3, 4, 7, 9, 11, 13)
- Peter Maslen – drums (8)
- Dave Williams – drums (10, 12)
- Billy Hawn – percussion (2, 6)
- Ameena Khawaja – cello (2, 6)
- Zoe Knighton – cello (14)
- Chris Cameron – string arrangements (3, 7, 9)
- Daniel Denholm – string arrangements and conductor (10)
- Vince Pizzinga – cello arrangements (14)
- Ami Richardson – backing vocals (3)
- Cathy Dennis – backing vocals (4)
- Bridget Benenate – backing vocals (5)
- Tim Woodcock – backing vocals (9)

=== Production ===
- Michael Taylor – A&R direction
- Ric Wake – producer (1), arrangements (2)
- Russ DeSalvo – arrangements (1)
- John Fields – producer (2, 6), arrangements (2, 6)
- Gary Barlow – producer (3, 4, 7, 9, 11, 13)
- Eliot Kennedy – producer (3, 4, 7, 9, 11, 13)
- Matthew Gerrard – producer (5), arrangements (5)
- David Nicholas – producer (8, 10, 12)
- Delta Goodrem – producer (14)
- Mark Russell – production coordination (1)
- Tonya Lyons – A&R product manager
- Jenny Sullivan – design
- Carlotta Moye – photography
- Damian Duncan – additional photography
- Glenn Wheatley – management

Technical

- Greg Calbi – mastering at Sterling Sound (New York City, New York, USA)
- Bob Cadway – recording (1)
- Doug "DUG" McGuirk – guitar recording (1)
- Michael Brauer – mixing (1–3, 5–13)
- John Fields – recording (2, 6)
- Gary Barlow – mixing (4)
- Eliot Kennedy – mixing (4)
- Chong Lim – vocal engineer (5)
- David Nicholas – vocal engineer (5)
- Justin Tressider – Pro Tools engineer (8, 10, 12)
- Vince Pizzinga – recording (14)
- Jim Annunziatto – assistant engineer (1)
- Robbie Adams – assistant engineer (2, 6), engineer (3, 4, 7, 9, 11, 13)
- Carl Schubert – assistant engineer (2, 3, 6, 7, 9, 11, 13)
- Sam Storey – assistant engineer (2, 6)
- Jimi Maroudas – assistant engineer (8, 10, 12)
- Dan Reymer – assistant engineer (8, 10, 12)
- Paul Pislnenkis – assistant engineer (10, 12)
- Blair Simmons – assistant engineer (10, 12)

== Charts ==
=== Weekly charts ===
Chart (2003)	Peak position
Australian Albums (ARIA)	1
Austrian Albums (Ö3 Austria)	27
Dutch Albums (Album Top 100)	39
European Top 100 Albums	9
Finnish Albums (Suomen virallinen lista)	15
French Albums (SNEP)	39
German Albums (Offizielle Top 100)	20
Irish Albums (IRMA)	3
New Zealand Albums (RMNZ)	6
Norwegian Albums (VG-lista)	12
Scottish Albums (Official Charts)	2
Swedish Albums (Sverigetopplistan)	48
Swiss Albums (Schweizer Hitparade)	14
UK Albums (Official Charts)	2

=== Year-end charts ===
Chart (2003)	Position
Australian Albums (ARIA)	1
New Zealand Albums (RMNZ)	9
UK Albums (OCC)	16
Chart (2004)	Position
Australian Albums (ARIA)	16
New Zealand Albums (RMNZ)	42
UK Albums (OCC)	159

=== Decade-end charts ===
Chart (2000–2009)	Position
Australian Albums (ARIA)	1

== Certifications ==
Region	Certification	Certified units/sales
Australia (ARIA)	15× Platinum	1,120,000
Germany (BVMI)	Gold	150,000^{^}
New Zealand (RMNZ)	4× Platinum	60,000^{^}
United Kingdom (BPI)	3× Platinum	900,000^{*}
Summaries
Europe (IFPI)	Platinum	1,000,000^{*}
^{*} Sales figures based on certification alone.^{^} Shipments figures based on certification alone.

== See also ==
- List of best-selling albums in Australia
