= I Don't Care (Angela Via song) =

2000 song by Angela Via

Single by Angela Via

from the album Angela Via
- Released: September 19, 2000
- Length: 3:41
- Label: Atlantic
- Songwriters: David Frank; Steve Kipner; Pamela Sheyne
- Producers: David Frank; Steve Kipner

Angela Via singles chronology
"Picture Perfect" (2000)	"I Don't Care" (2000)	"Speakin' Spanish" (2006)

"I Don't Care" is a song by American singer and actress Angela Via, written by David Frank, Steve Kipner and Pamela Sheyne. It was produced by Frank and Kipner for Via's unreleased self-titled debut album, which was intended for a June 2000 release. The single was released in the United States on September 19, charting on the Billboard Hot Singles Sales chart.

"I Don't Care" was aimed at fans of Britney Spears (after the success of her single "...Baby One More Time"), Christina Aguilera (her hit "Genie in a Bottle" was co-written by Frank, Kipner and Sheyne), and 'N Sync.

== Track listing ==
CD single

1. "I Don't Care"
2. "A Good Time"
3. "Picture Perfect" (music video)

Maxi-single

1. "I Don't Care"
2. The Stickmix
3. Soul Solution Uptempo Radio Mix
4. Soul Solution Mix Show Edit
5. Soul Solution Extended Club Mix
6. 912 Dub
7. Soul Solution Bonus Beats
8. "Picture Perfect" (video)

== Charts ==
Chart (2000)	Peak position
U.S. Billboard Hot Singles Sales	74

== Delta Goodrem version ==
"I Don't Care"

Single by Delta Goodrem
- B-side: "Here I Am"
- Released: November 12, 2001
- Genre: Teen pop
- Length: 3:39
- Label: Epic
- Songwriters: David Frank; Steve Kipner; Pamela Sheyne
- Producer: Vince Pizzinga

Delta Goodrem singles chronology
"I Don't Care" (2001)	"Born to Try" (2002)

Music video
- "I Don't Care" on YouTube

Delta Goodrem released a cover version of "I Don't Care" as her debut single on November 12, 2001. It appeared on the ARIA Singles Chart, but it was not included on her debut album, Innocent Eyes (2003). The Sydney Morning Herald's Guy Blackman described the track as "an anonymous slice of Britney-esque 'tween-pop'". Goodrem had been "discovered and nurtured" by Glenn Wheatley, and signed with Sony Music Australia. The track was recorded with Vince Pizzinga (Danielle Spencer) producing.

In August 2007, Goodrem explained to Andrew Denton on his show Enough Rope with Andrew Denton that the Britney image was foisted on her "when you start with a record company you don't really know what the whole process is. You don't know how the whole military operation before a song even gets to the radio and for people to even get to hear it". Despite seldom mentioned as Goodrem's debut single, it did feature during her 2005 Visualise Tour. It was also featured in the "Edge of Seventeen" medley, which was included as a B-side to her single "I Can't Break It to My Heart".

=== Music video ===
Goodrem's video for this song followed a simple theme. It showed an angsty Goodrem escaping from her parents' house to be with her rebellious boyfriend. The boyfriend takes Goodrem on a motorcycle ride into the forest, where he blindfolds her. When Goodrem takes her blindfold off, she is surrounded by a tree full of ribbons, a special surprise that was created by the boyfriend. The video is also intercut with scenes of Goodrem dancing in a Christmas-light-filled backdrop, and a scene where Goodrem is dancing in a wheat field.

=== Track listing ===
No.	Title	Writer(s)	Length
1.	"I Don't Care"	David Frank, Steve Kipner	3:44
2.	"I Don't Care" (The Down & Low on Not Caring)	Frank, Kipner	3:57
3.	"I Don't Care" (Hype Music Remix)	Frank, Kipner	3:33
4.	"Here I Am"		3:59
Total length:			15:12

=== Charts ===
Chart (2001)	Peak position
Australian Singles Chart	64
