= Bridget Benenate =

American songwriter

Bridget Benenate is an American songwriter. She first found success in her song "Permission To Shine", which was performed by the band Bachelor Girl. The same year Bridget's song "Everything Changes" was featured on Dawson’s Creek.

In 2001, Benenate met music producer Matthew Gerrard. They started to collaborate. One of the first songs they wrote together was "Hold On" for the girl group B*Witched, which was featured in the movie Princess Diaries. In 2003 the duo penned several songs for Christian artists Nate Sallie and Jaci Velasquez. Jaci’s album, Unspoken, included the song ""Lost Without You," which was later released as the US debut single for the Australian pop idol Delta Goodrem.

Bridget Benenate appeared as guest vocalist for the track Ever Since We Met on Chris Botti's 2003 album A Thousand Kisses Deep. Botti, Benenate and Gerrard were co-writers on the track.

It was not until 2004 that Benenate found her biggest success to date by penning the number one single, "Breakaway," for American Idol winner Kelly Clarkson. "Breakaway" spent a record twenty consecutive weeks at number one on the Billboard Adult Contemporary chart.

Benenate’s most recent successes includes the title cut on JoJo's second album The High Road and the song "Still There For Me" on High School Musical fame, Corbin Bleu’s debut album.
