= Jarrad Rogers =

Jarrad Rogers, 'Mstr Rogers'
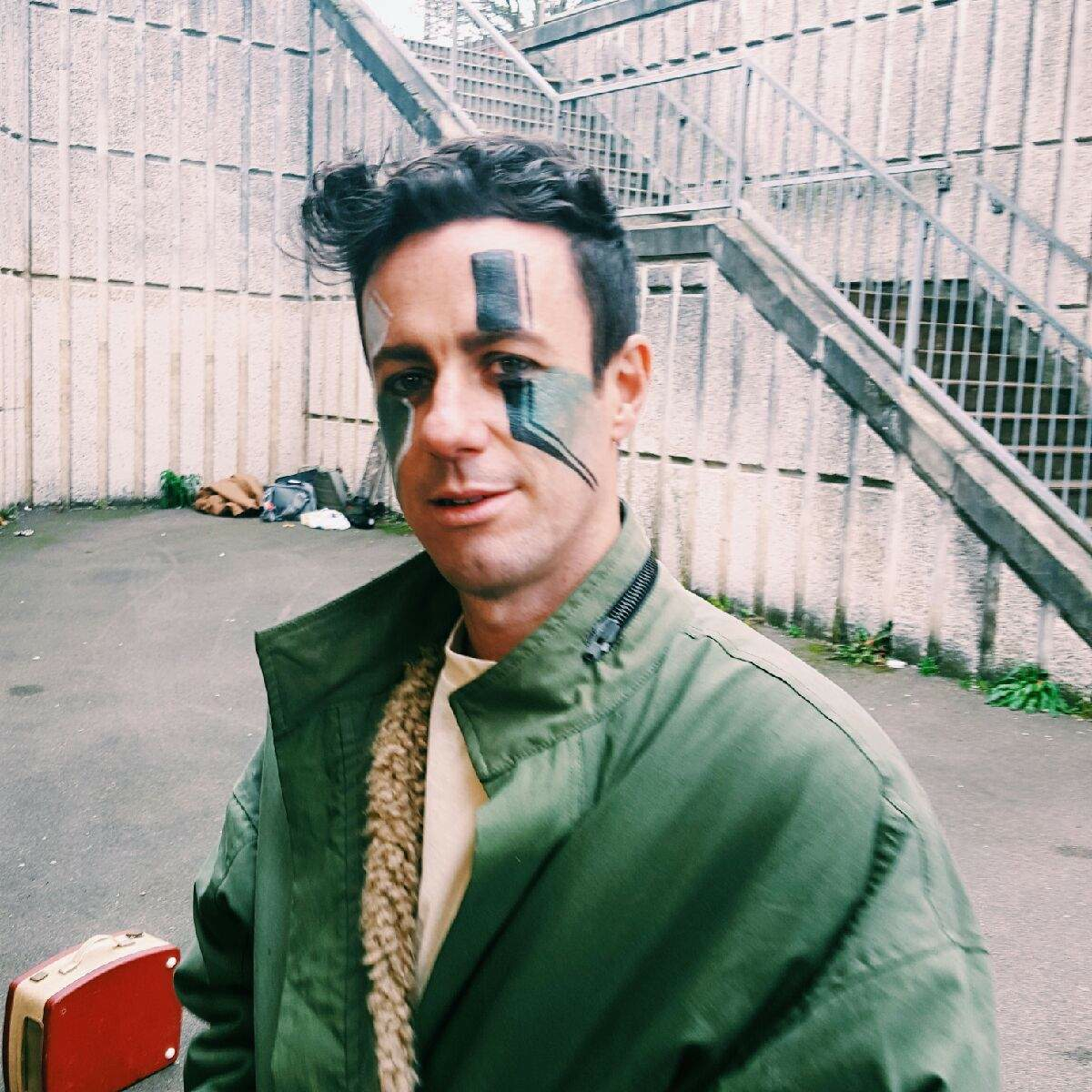

Background information
- Also known as: Mstr Rogers
- Born: Jarrad Leith Rogers
- Origin: Melbourne, Australia
- Genres: Pop, EDM
- Occupations: Artist, record producer, songwriter
- Years active: 2001–present
- Formerly of: Beachwood

Jarrad Leith Rogers, a.k.a. "Mstr Rogers" is an Australian-British artist, songwriter and pop producer.

== Early life ==
Jarrad played trumpet and classical piano from an early age. Studying piano under renowned concert pianist, Alexander Sumetski, he progressed to the Australian Music Education Board's highest grade. At 13, he formed a band with his brother and together they won studio time through a local band competition which sparked his interest in music production. He completed a double degree with Honours in Business Management and Civil Engineering at RMIT University in Melbourne and then worked as a consultant for Accenture but spent all his spare time pursuing music.

== Career ==
=== 2001–2005: Beginnings in Australia ===
From 2001, Jarrad worked as the in-house producer at a newly formed independent record label in Melbourne and developed the direction and sound of artists Daniel Merriweather and Phrase. He co-wrote the singles 'Predictable' and 'Not Me, Not I' with Delta Goodrem and Kara DioGuardi for 15 x platinum selling Australian artist Delta Goodrem's debut album 'Innocent Eyes'. Innocent Eyes was the highest-selling album in Australia of the decade. 'Not me, Not I' peaked at number-one in the Australian charts, breaking Kylie Minogue's record of having the most songs released from an album to reach number-one. 'Predictable' also reached number-one and remained in the top ten for eight weeks.

Jarrad went on to write and produce songs for Australian Idol winner Guy Sebastian. In 2006, Jarrad won a prestigious Australasian Performing Right Association (APRA) award in the category of 'Most Performed Urban Work' for 'Oh Oh', a single which Jarrad produced and co-wrote with Guy Sebastian). He also wrote with Ricki-Lee Coulter the song ('Sunshine', No. 8) and Jimmy Barnes ('Say It Ain't So' which appears on AUS No. 1 selling album 'Double Happiness').

=== 2005–2014: Success in the United Kingdom ===
In 2005, Jarrad signed a publishing deal with Mushroom Music and relocated to London.

On a songwriting trip to LA in 2006, Jarrad had the opportunity to work with and produce songs (unreleased) for Lauryn Hill who was in the process of writing new material. Jarrad co-wrote 'Smilin' with Bryn Christopher) and The Quest, and also featured in series 4 of Grey's Anatomy). In 2006, Jarrad produced Official Remixes for Mark Ronson single 'Valarie featuring Amy Winehouse, and Groove Armada's single 'Song 4 Mutya'.

Jarrad produced and co-wrote 'Love You Anyway' for Boyzone, which entered the UK singles charts at No. 5 and peaked in the Irish singles charts at No. 3 In October 2008, Jarrad produced a song for Annie Lennox, ('Pattern of My Life').

2010 saw Jarrad write with artist Alex Clare. Two songs from these sessions, 'Treading Water' (co-written with Eg White) and 'Sanctuary' were chosen to feature on Clare's debut album on Island Records which was released on 8 July 2011. The Lateness of the Hour. The album peaked at number 17 on the UK Albums Chart, number 8 on the German Albums Chart and number 48 on the US Billboard 200. 'Treading Water' was released as a single.

Jarrad also wrote with Lana Del Rey in 2011. Together they wrote 'Live or Die' which was leaked online. In 2011, Jarrad also produced and co-wrote (with Bryn Christopher) for The Saturdays' 2011 album On Your Radar. He also worked with UK rap artist Tinchy Stryder and wrote "Bright Lights", which entered the UK Singles Chart at number seven and featured Pixie Lott as a guest vocalist. Pixie released her own version of the song on her album Young Foolish Happy titled "Bright Lights (Good Life) Part II", which Jarrad also produced.

Between November 2011 and February 2012, Jarrad co-wrote and produced the debut album from X Factor finalist Aiden Grimshaw, titled Misty Eye. The album was released to critical acclaim and entered the UK Albums Chart at No. 19 on 26 August 2012.

Dance producer Avicii released a version of Jarrad's song "Last Dance", co-written with Karen Poole. The track was premiered on Pete Tong's show on BBC Radio 1 on 23 March 2012. Jarrad co-wrote "Give Me Life" which was released by English boy band JLS on their fourth studio album, Evolution. The album was released on 5 November 2012 through RCA Records and debuted at number 3 in the UK. In 2012, Jarrad was an 'International Judge' for Australasian Performing Right Association's prestigious songwriting competition and was asked to be the key speaker for an APRA event held on 6 December 2012 at the Australia Centre, The Strand, London.

In early 2013, Jarrad co-wrote "Lost Boys" with Roy Stryde and Australian Band, 5 Seconds of Summer which was performed by the band while they were supporting One Direction on their world tour. "Ghost Ship", co-written by Jarrad, Devlin and Alex Clare was released on A Moving Picture, the second studio album by English rapper Devlin. The album was released on 4 February 2013 and peaked at number 19 on the UK charts. In May 2013, "Fire Starter", a song co-written with Lindy Robbins and Julia Michaels, was released on the fourth studio album by Demi Lovato, on Hollywood Records. The album debuted at number three on the US Billboard 200 with first-week sales of 110,000 copies, becoming her best-selling debut week of her career. "Fire Starter" was chosen by E! to feature on their promotion for the 8th season of Keeping Up with the Kardashians.

Icona Pop released "In the Stars", a song co-written and produced by Jarrad which appears on their full-length album, This Is... Icona Pop. "In the Stars" was also released in association with Samsung's Galaxy series, using a 'Galaxy mix' of the original. In December 2013, Rebecca Ferguson released her second album Freedom which includes five songs co-written and produced by Jarrad. The album debuted at number 6 and the single "I Hope" debuted at number 15 on the UK charts. The Album achieved a silver certification from the BPI after just 3 weeks since its release date followed by a Gold certification on 27 December 2013.

Glorious, the debut studio album by the Grammy award winner Foxes, released 12 May 2014, features 'Night Owls Early Birds' which Jarrad co-wrote and produced. In July 2014, 'Lost Boy' was released on the Australian version of 5 Seconds of Summer's self-titled debut studio album. The album which went to number 1 on the Australian charts. He co-wrote with James Morrison for his forthcoming album. He also collaborated with Charli XCX for releases for a number of artists. On 28 July, Neon Jungle released 'So Alive', produced by Jarrad and co-written with Charli XCX and Ana Diaz. Neon Jungle's album, 'Welcome to the Jungle', went to number 8 on the UK Album Charts.

=== 2015–present: Move to America ===
In October 2015, Mstr Rogers released his own debut single, "I'll Take You" on Big Beat Records. In January 2016, it reached no. 1 on the Global Viral Chart and no. 6 on the US Viral Chart.

In June 2017, Mstr Rogers released his follow up single, "Don't You Think", featuring Aanysa on Ultra Music.

Jarrad signed a record deal with Ultra Music and released "Sooner or Later" (1+ million streams across platforms). He has done official remixes for Twenty One Pilots and Andra Day.

He co-wrote and produced Rachel Platten's single "Broken Glass" in 2017. As of October 2017, it was 31 on AC radio chart and growing and has 7+ million Spotify streams.

He co-wrote "Like That" for Bea Miller which has over 56 million Spotify streams.

In 2017, Mstr Rogers signed a deal with Circle Live Agency.

He has upcoming releases for Andy Grammer including "Smoke Clears" (writer / producer) and "Workin On It" (producer).

Rogers is currently based in Los Angeles.
