= Innocent Eyes (song) =

2003 single by Delta Goodrem

Single by Delta Goodrem

from the album Innocent Eyes
- B-side: "Hear Me Calling"; "Lost for Words"
- Released: 9 June 2003
- Studio: Mansfield Lodge, Conway (Los Angeles); Metropolis Audio (Melbourne, Australia)
- Length: 3:52
- Label: Epic
- Songwriters: Delta Goodrem; Vince Pizzinga
- Producer: John Fields

Delta Goodrem singles chronology
"Lost Without You" (2003)	"Innocent Eyes" (2003)	"Not Me, Not I" (2003)

Music video
- "Innocent Eyes" on YouTube

"Innocent Eyes" is a song written by Delta Goodrem and Vince Pizzinga and produced by John Fields for Goodrem's first album, Innocent Eyes (2003). It was released as the album's third single in Australia on 9 June 2003. Goodrem has stated the song is one of her favourite tracks on the Innocent Eyes album and that its lyrics are autobiographical, and is dedicated to her family. The song became her third number-one single in Australia and also peaked within the top 20 in the United Kingdom and New Zealand. She also performed the song on an episode of Australian soap opera Neighbours where she had a starring role as Nina Tucker.

== Music video ==
The music video for "Innocent Eyes" was filmed in the Intercontinental Hotel in Sydney, Australia, and was directed by Michael Gracey. It was filmed between 2 May 2003 – 3 May 2003 and was released in June that same year. The video shows Delta Goodrem backstage waiting to go on and reminiscing about being a little girl (played by Morgan Griffin) doing things like singing, dancing and dressing up. It took twenty hours in total to film the video and she felt it hard trying to put the film clip in other people's hands because she feels that it was her song and was wrenching when people tamper with it to try for marketing. The video, with behind the scenes, is available on Goodrem's first DVD Delta (2003).

== Promotion and chart performance ==
Promotion for the single included a Melbourne instore appearance in which Goodrem signed autographs for a record eight hours to an estimated crowd of 10,000 people. Two CD singles were released to stores in Australia, the first CD featured the title track and the two B-sides "Hear Me Calling" (written by Goodrem and Pizzinga) and "Lost for Words" (written by Goodrem), while the second CD featured remixes of "Lost Without You", a free Delta Goodrem phone logo and a choice of ringtones between "Born to Try", "Lost Without You" and "Innocent Eyes".

The song made its debut on the Australian ARIA Singles Chart at number two, being held off the number-one spot by "Bring Me to Life" by Evanescence on 16 June 2003. After two weeks of being on the chart, it knocked Evanescence off the top spot and stayed there for two weeks, making the song Goodrem's third consecutive number-one single. After nine weeks, it spent its last week in the top 10 and fell to number 12. It spent a total of 20 weeks in the top 50, accredited platinum by Australian Recording Industry Association (ARIA) and was the 18th-highest-selling single in Australia during 2003. In New Zealand, the song debuted on the RIANZ Singles Chart at number 44, then jumped 25 places to number 19 before peaking the following week at number 14. It spent a total of 12 weeks in the chart before leaving from number 49. The song debuted at number nine in the United Kingdom, becoming Goodrem's third top-10 single there. It additionally debuted and peaked at number 25 in Ireland, spending a total on six weeks on the chart.

== Track listings ==
Australian CD1
No.	Title	Writer(s)	Length
1.	"Innocent Eyes"	Delta Goodrem, Vince Pizzinga
2.	"Hear Me Calling"	Goodrem, Pizzinga
3.	"Lost for Words"	Goodrem

Australian CD2
No.	Title	Writer(s)	Length
1.	"Innocent Eyes"	Goodrem, Pizzinga
2.	"Lost Without You" (Smash N Grab extended)	Matthew Gerrard, Bridget Benenate
3.	"Lost Without You" (The Luge mix)	Gerrard, Benenate

UK CD1
No.	Title	Writer(s)	Length
1.	"Innocent Eyes" (album version)	Goodrem, Pizzinga	3:53
2.	"Lost Without You" (Soulchild remix)	Gerrard, Benenate	3:55
3.	"Lost for Words"	Goodrem	4:15
4.	"Innocent Eyes" (video)	Goodrem, Pizzinga	3:53

UK CD2
No.	Title	Writer(s)	Length
1.	"Innocent Eyes" (album version)	Goodrem, Pizzinga	3:53
2.	"Innocent Eyes" (The Luge mix)	Goodrem, Pizzinga	5:09
3.	"Lost Without You" (video shoot behind the scenes footage)

UK cassette single
No.	Title	Writer(s)	Length
1.	"Innocent Eyes" (album version)	Goodrem, Pizzinga	3:53
2.	"Lost Without You" (Soulchild remix)	Gerrard, Benenate	3:55

== Credits and personnel ==
Credits are lifted from the Innocent Eyes album booklet.

Studios

- Produced, recorded, and arranged at Mansfield Lodge, Conway (Los Angeles), and Metropolis Audio (Melbourne, Australia)
- Mastered at Sterling Sound (New York City)

Personnel

- Delta Goodrem – writing, piano
- Vince Pizzinga – writing
- John Fields – guitars, bass, keyboards, production, recording, arrangement
- Phil Solem – guitars
- Mike Ruekberg – baritone guitar
- David Falzone – piano
- Dorian Crozier – drums
- Billy Hawn – percussion
- Ameena Khawaja – cello
- Sam Storey – studio assistance (Conway)
- Robbie Adams – studio assistance (Metropolis)
- Carl Schubert – studio assistance (Metropolis)
- Michael H. Brauer – mixing
- Greg Calbi – mastering

== Charts ==
=== Weekly charts ===
Chart (2003)	Peak position
Australia (ARIA)	1
Ireland (IRMA)	25
New Zealand (Recorded Music NZ)	14
Scotland Singles (OCC)	8
UK Singles (OCC)	9

=== Year-end charts ===
Chart (2003)	Position
Australia (ARIA)	18
UK Singles (OCC)	186

== Certifications ==
Region	Certification	Certified units/sales
Australia (ARIA)	Platinum	70,000^{^}
^{^} Shipments figures based on certification alone.

== Release history ==
Region	Date	Format	Label	Catalogue	Ref.
Australia	9 June 2003	CD	Epic	673857.2	
Australia	9 June 2003	CD	Epic	673857.5	
United Kingdom	22 September 2003	CD	Epic	674315 2	
United Kingdom	22 September 2003	CD	Epic	674315 5	
United Kingdom	22 September 2003	Cassette	Epic	674315 4	
