= Delta Goodrem =

Australian singer-songwriter (born 1984)

Delta Goodrem AM
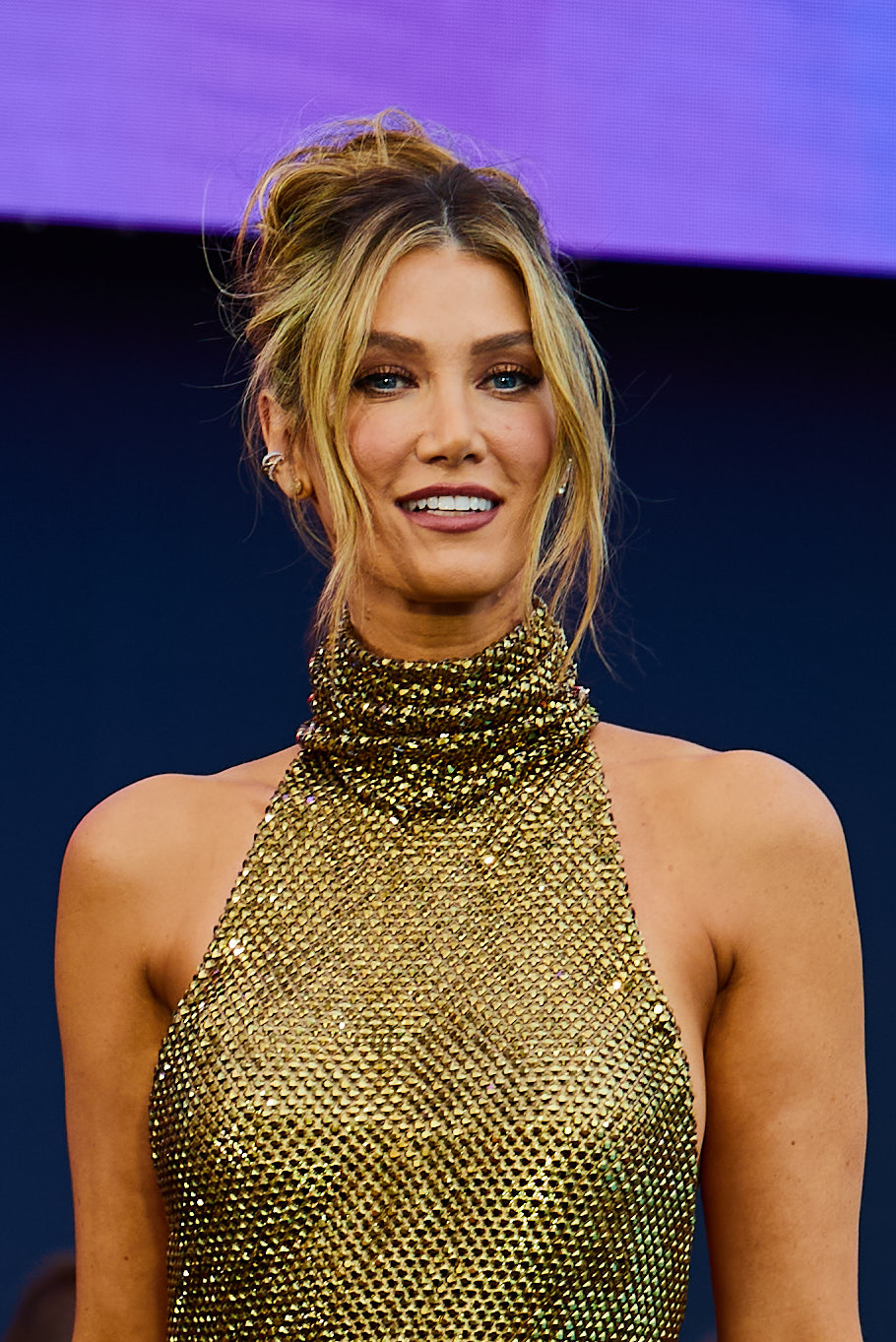
- Goodrem in 2026
- Born: Delta Lea Goodrem; 9 November 1984 (age 42); Sydney, New South Wales, Australia
- Occupations: Singer; songwriter; actress
- Spouse: Matthew Copley (m. 2025)
- Awards: Full list
- Musical career
- Genres: Pop; pop rock
- Instruments: Vocals; piano; guitar
- Years active: 1993–present
- Labels: Columbia; Daylight; Electrola; Epic; Mercury; Sony Music; ATLED; Better Now
- Website: deltagoodrem.com

Delta Lea Goodrem AM (born 9 November 1984) is an Australian singer, songwriter and actress. She has a total of nine number-one singles and 17 top-ten hits on the ARIA Singles Chart. She has sold over eight million albums globally and overall has won three World Music Awards, 12 ARIA Music Awards, an MTV Video Music Award and several other awards.

Born and raised in Sydney, Goodrem signed a recording contract with Sony Music at the age of 15, in 1999. Her debut studio album, Innocent Eyes (2003), topped the ARIA Albums Chart for 29 non-consecutive weeks. It is one of the best-selling albums in Australia and is the second-best-selling Australian album of all time with over four million copies sold. Goodrem's second studio album, Mistaken Identity (2004), was recorded while she was undergoing treatment for cancer. It became her second number-one album. In 2007, Goodrem released Delta, her third number-one album, which included another number-one single, "In This Life". Her fourth studio album, Child of the Universe (2012), produced the single "Sitting on Top of the World". In 2016, her fifth studio album, Wings of the Wild, became her fourth number-one album on the ARIA Albums Chart, while giving her another number-one single, "Wings". Goodrem's most recent and fifth number-one studio album, Bridge over Troubled Dreams, was released in May 2021.

From 2012 to 2020, Goodrem was a coach for eight seasons on The Voice Australia and during her one-season hiatus in 2014, served as a coach on The Voice Kids. Since 2020, she has hosted the annual Christmas special Christmas with Delta on the Nine Network. Goodrem represented Australia in the Eurovision Song Contest 2026 with the song "Eclipse", finishing in fourth place. Later in the year, Goodrem is competing on the twenty-fourth series of Strictly Come Dancing, the original British version of Dancing with the Stars.

== Life and career ==
=== 1984–2000: Early life and discovery ===
Delta Lea Goodrem was born in Sydney, New South Wales, Australia, on 9 November 1984, to Lea (née Parker) and Denis Goodrem. She has a younger brother, Trent. Goodrem appeared in an American advertisement aged seven for the former toy company Galoob, alongside fellow Australian Bec Hewitt, and began playing piano at the same age while taking up singing, dancing and acting lessons. She appeared in adverts for companies such as Optus and Nesquik, and had several minor roles in episodes of Australian television shows including Hey Dad..!, A Country Practice, and Police Rescue.

While residing in Glenhaven, she attended the Hills Grammar School in neighbouring Kenthurst, from kindergarten until Year 11. At the age of thirteen, Goodrem recorded a five-song demo CD, financed through her television work. It was sent to the Australian rules football club Sydney Swans (of which Goodrem is a supporter) and they passed it onto talent manager Glenn Wheatley. Wheatley signed Goodrem to an artist development deal with independent record label, Empire Records.

Between June 1999 and September 2000, Goodrem worked with producers Paul Higgins and Trevor Carter on thirteen tracks for an album to be called Delta. A later report on these sessions described Goodrem as "an ambitious 15-year-old keen to emulate the pop sound of the Spice Girls, Britney Spears and Mandy Moore." Most of the tracks were written by Carter, although Goodrem co-wrote two and self-wrote the song "Love". Goodrem did a photoshoot for the album (some of the photos have surfaced), and recorded a home-made style music video for the song "Say" which has since leaked onto the internet. Higgins took the album to Village Roadshow, which offered to market and distribute the album, but the deal was blocked by Goodrem's parents. The album has yet to surface, though it became the subject of a lawsuit in 2004.

=== 2001–2003: Neighbours and Innocent Eyes ===
"I Don't Care" (2001)
Goodrem's debut single was a pop-dance song which failed to make an impact on the charts.

At the age of 15, Goodrem signed a recording contract with Sony Music and began work on an album of pop–dance songs including the unsuccessful debut single, "I Don't Care", which peaked at number sixty four on the ARIA Singles Chart in November 2001. The album and proposed second single "A Year Ago Today" were pushed aside as a result, allowing Goodrem and Sony to re-evaluate her future musical direction. In 2002, Goodrem took up the role as shy schoolgirl and aspiring singer Nina Tucker in the popular television soap opera Neighbours, which helped re-launch Goodrem's music career. The piano-based ballad "Born to Try", co-written by Audius Mtawarira, premiered on the show and reached number one on the ARIA Singles Chart and the New Zealand singles chart, and number three in the UK. "Born to Try" was certified triple Platinum in Australia for sales of over 210,000 copies. Goodrem's role on the show scored her a Logie for "Most Popular New Talent" at the Logie Awards of 2003. In January 2003, "Lost Without You" topped the ARIA Singles Chart and reached number four in New Zealand and the UK. It was certified double platinum for sales over 140,000 copies in Australia.

Goodrem's largely self-penned debut studio album, Innocent Eyes, was released on 24 March 2003 in Australia and debuted at number one on the ARIA Album Charts, breaking Australian records previously held by John Farnham's Whispering Jack (1986) by staying at number one for 29 consecutive weeks, while tying with Neil Diamond's Hot August Night (1972) as the second-longest charting number one album with a total of 29 weeks at top spot. It was the highest-selling album in Australia of 2003 and sold 1.2 million copies in Australia, and over 4 million worldwide. The album also charted highly in the UK, peaking at number two. The album's third single "Innocent Eyes" again reached number one on the ARIA Singles Chart and number nine in the UK. It was certified Platinum in Australia for sales over 70,000 copies.

In July, Goodrem was diagnosed with Hodgkin lymphoma, a form of cancer. This forced her to take a break from her career to undergo treatment, however singles from Innocent Eyes continued. The album's fourth single, "Not Me, Not I", became her fourth consecutive number one single in Australia, overtaking the previous effort of three number-ones from Kylie Minogue's debut studio album, Kylie (1988). It was certified Platinum for sales over 70,000 copies. In early August, Goodrem announced she would not renew her contract with Glenn Wheatley. Her mother, Lea Goodrem, replaced him as her manager. Later that month, Goodrem won seven ARIA Music Awards, including "Best Female Artist", surpassing Natalie Imbruglia's previous record of six awards in 1999. As she was too unwell to perform at the ceremony herself, singer Darren Hayes performed a rendition of "Lost Without You" as a tribute, bringing an overwhelmed Goodrem to tears. Her first full-length DVD Delta became the highest-selling music DVD by an Australian artist in Australia ever, with a certification of 11× platinum. The Australian-only release "Predictable" became her fifth consecutive number one on the ARIA Singles Chart in December and was certified double Platinum for sales of over 140,000 copies.

=== 2004–2006: Mistaken Identity ===
After announcing in late December 2003 that she was in remission, Goodrem began work on her second studio album. Goodrem received two nominations at the Logie Awards of 2004 including a Gold Logie nomination for "Most Popular Personality on Australian Television".

In March 2004, while Goodrem was still undergoing cancer treatment, Paul Higgins and Trevor Carter announced plans to release the album they had recorded with the then 15-year-old Goodrem in 1999 and 2000. They shopped the album around and ignited a bidding war amongst record companies. After the success of Innocent Eyes, industry experts expected that bidding for the album could attract figures anywhere between $1.5 million and $15 million. When Goodrem and her family disapproved of the album's release, a lawsuit was filed. Goodrem's lawyers claimed the album was made up of unfinished demo recordings which were not fit for commercial release. After much coverage in the media, the case was settled in mediation. In exchange for not releasing the album, Higgins and Carter received an unspecified payout.

In September 2004, she became the face of soft drink company Pepsi in Australia, appearing on the product, billboards, TV advertisements and performing an exclusive show for competition winners. In October Goodrem launched her own lingerie line titled "Delta by Annabella".

Goodrem's second studio album, Mistaken Identity, was released in Australia on 8 November 2004 and debuted at number one on the ARIA Albums chart. It was certified five times platinum for sales of 350,000 copies. The album spent 46 weeks in the top fifty. It also reached number seven in New Zealand, and peaked at number 25 in the UK. The album's lead single, "Out of the Blue", which was co-written and produced by Guy Chambers, was released prior to the album on 8 October 2004. "Out of the Blue" debuted at number one on the ARIA Singles Chart and number nine in the UK. This was Goodrem's sixth straight number-one single in Australia. It was certified platinum in Australia.

The second single, "Mistaken Identity", released as a single only in Australia, debuted at number seven and was certified Gold. "Almost Here", a duet with Irish singer and then boyfriend Brian McFadden of Westlife, was released as the third single and reached number three in the UK and became her seventh ARIA number one, along with her first number one in Ireland. It was certified platinum in Australia. "A Little Too Late" was released only in Australia and peaked at number 13. "Be Strong" was released as the album's fifth and final single in Australia as a digital download on 17 October 2005. At the time of release, digital downloads were not included as part of the main singles chart, therefore it was ineligible to chart. Much of the album, in particular "Extraordinary Day", was inspired by her battle with cancer. Reflecting on that period of her life, Goodrem said "It's weird to see pictures of that time. In some ways the fact that I was so sick was so out there, and yet I kept it really private. No-one saw me on the days I was really sick. I was 18 when I was diagnosed and I had a number one album and single in the country. And in the UK, I was number two. It was such a bipolar year".

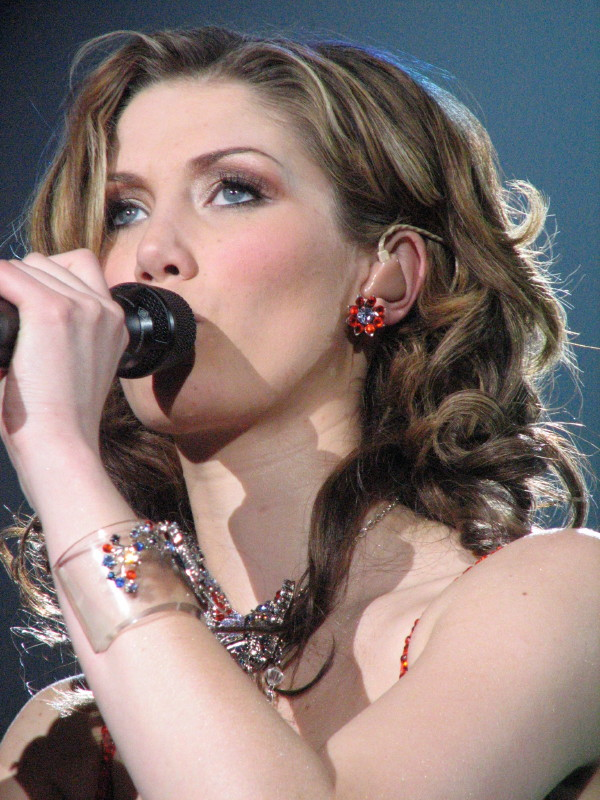
Goodrem performing in Canberra, Australia, 2005

In March 2005, Goodrem starred in her first film role in Hating Alison Ashley, a film based on the 1984 children's novel by Robin Klein, with Goodrem acting the title character. The film performed poorly at the box office and was not a critical success, with some critics citing Goodrem's performance as too robotic and detached. April 2005 saw Goodrem relocate to New York to launch her career in the United States with a reworked version of "Lost Without You". She appeared in the last two episodes of the short-lived American series North Shore in a bid to gain greater exposure. "Lost Without You" peaked at number eighteen on the Billboard Adult Contemporary chart.

In July, Goodrem embarked on her first headline concert tour of Australia, The Visualise Tour, performing to 80,000 people across ten shows. The Visualise Tour: Live in Concert was released in November and became Goodrem's second number one DVD.

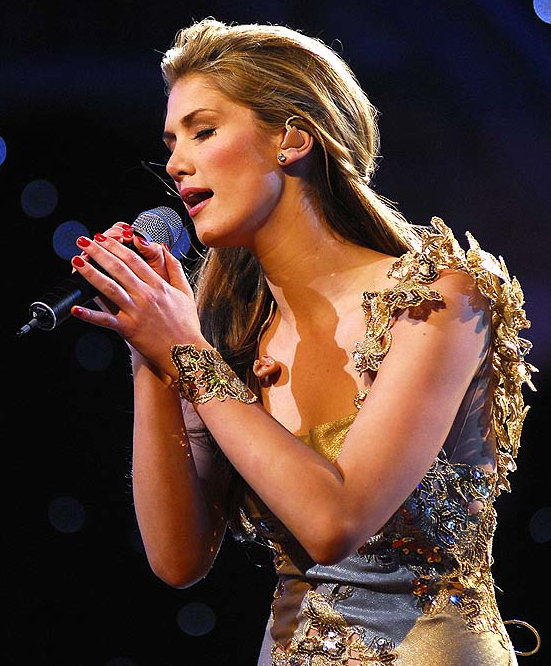
Goodrem performing at Carols by Candlelight in Melbourne, Australia, 2006

On 15 March 2006, Goodrem performed a new song, "Together We Are One", at the Commonwealth Games opening ceremony in front of 80,000 spectators and up to 1.5 billion television viewers worldwide. The song, written specifically for the event, was released in Australia, where it peaked at number two on the ARIA Singles Chart. In June 2006, Goodrem signed to Modest! Entertainment for her worldwide management. In October 2006, Goodrem promoted in Japan with the release of an updated version of Innocent Eyes and the Japan-only single "Flawed", which reached number one on the Japanese download chart. The album peaked at number eight on the Japanese international chart (excluding Japanese artists) and number nineteen on the official Japanese album chart (including Japanese artists). In November, Goodrem appeared with Westlife on the British reality television music competition series The X Factor to perform a duet titled "All Out of Love", which appeared on the boy band's seventh studio album, The Love Album. She was in Melbourne on Christmas Eve to headline the annual Carols by Candlelight.

=== 2007–2010: Delta ===
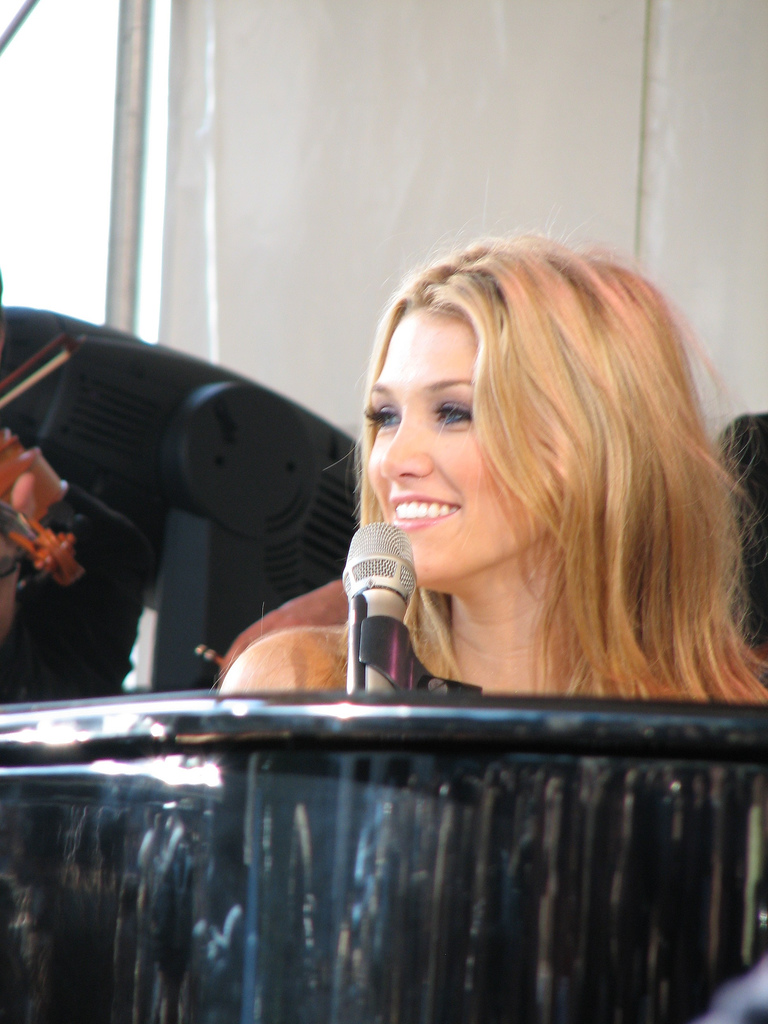
Goodrem performing at Federation Square in Melbourne, Australia, 2007

Goodrem's third studio album, the eponymous Delta, was released in Australia on 20 October 2007. Goodrem described the material as "...a lot lighter" compared to her previous album Mistaken Identity. She has also stated, "As people become more aware of your life, they can pinpoint what songs are about. On this album, I've tried to remove a lot of that and just write great pop songs, songs that are from my heart but there's no baggage with them". The album debuted at number one on the ARIA Albums Chart, making it her third number one album in her home country. and received platinum certification for shipments of 70,000 records, though sales were much lower; only 23,000 copies were sold during the first week. In December the album was certified 2× platinum. It eventually was certified 3× platinum in 2008. In New Zealand, the album debuted at number twelve on the RIANZ Albums Chart.

On 10 August 2007, Goodrem was in Los Angeles, United States, to film the music video for the album's lead single "In This Life", which is also the opening theme for the Japanese anime television series Deltora Quest, based on the book series by fellow Australian Emily Rodda. The video premiered on 31 August on Sunrise. "In This Life" was officially released on 15 September. It debuted at number one on the Australian Singles Chart, becoming Goodrem's eighth number-one single in Australia. It was certified platinum.

The second single, "Believe Again" was released on 10 December. It debuted and peaked at number two on the ARIA Singles Chart and was certified Gold. The third single, "You Will Only Break My Heart", was released on 29 March 2008 and peaked at number fourteen. The fourth single to be lifted from the album was "I Can't Break It to My Heart", which debuted and peaked at number thirteen.

In 2008, Goodrem focused on promoting music in Japan and the United States. She released "In This Life" on 23 January in Japan. She followed that up by releasing "Delta" on 20 February. The album peaked at number eight on the Japanese international chart and number 39 on the overall chart. The album sold almost 5,000 copies in its first week, 1,000 copies more than her previous album in Japan and overall sold over 30,000 copies in Japan. In the United States, Goodrem released "In This Life" on 15 April 2008. "In This Life" was released to US radio on 9 April. It was first released to the Triple A radio format, and then to the Adult Contemporary and Hot Adult Contemporary formats. On 17 June 2008, Goodrem appeared for the second time on any Billboard chart with the single, debuting at number 40 on the Hot Adult Top 40 Tracks chart. The song later peaked at No. 21. According to Nielsen SoundScan, the track sold 7,000 digital downloads in the week ending on 24 June 2008. The song also charted at number 20 on the Hot Adult Top 40 Recurrents. The album was then released on 15 July 2008 in the United States and Canada under the label Mercury Records. It peaked at number 18 on the US iTunes Store. It later debuted at number 116 on the US Billboard Album Chart and No. 1 on Billboard's Top Heatseekers with sales of 6,000 copies. Overall the album sold over 21,000 copies in the United States.

In July 2008, Goodrem announced her second national tour of Australia, the Believe Again Tour. She originally announced nine dates in seven cities, but later announced more shows, performing 14 in eight cities. The tour ran from 9 January to 4 February 2009. A concert DVD of the tour was released on 18 September 2009. It peaked at number one on the Australian ARIA DVD Chart and was certified Gold for sales over 7,500 copies. Goodrem also recorded a duet, "Right Here with You", with Olivia Newton-John to help raise money for Newton-John's cancer hospital in Melbourne, Australia.

Goodrem was nominated for two awards at the ARIA Music Awards of 2008 – Highest Selling Single and Highest Selling Album – and won the award for Highest Selling Album of 2008. At the 2008 World Music Awards, held on 9 November in Monaco, Goodrem received her third World Music Award for World's Best Selling Australian Artist. In March 2010, Goodrem and Guy Sebastian were chosen by the Jackson estate to perform at the Australian launch of Michael Jackson's This Is It DVD. The invitation-only event was attended by the film's director Kenny Ortega, Jackson's choreographer Travis Payne, and Jackson's brother Jackie Jackson. Goodrem and Sebastian performed "Earth Song".

=== 2011–2014: Child of the Universe and The Voice ===
Goodrem at the opening of the Louis Vuitton in Sydney, Australia, 2011

On 24 November 2011, Goodrem was confirmed to be a part of the judging panel of the Australian version of The Voice which aired in early 2012, coaching alongside Keith Urban, Joel Madden, and Seal. Some of Goodrem's decisions on the show sparked criticism, with comments she was "all style" and "little substance". Rachael Leahcar was Goodrem's contestant in the final four. This was after Goodrem chose Leahcar over Glenn Cunningham, who was Goodrem's backing vocalist on her Believe Again Tour in 2009. Leahcar finished third. Goodrem returned for season two in 2013, again with Madden and Seal, with Ricky Martin replacing Urban. Goodrem's finalist for season two was Celia Pavey who also finished third.

On 30 March 2012, Goodrem announced the release of her new single, "Sitting on Top of the World". The song debuted and peaked at number two on the ARIA Singles Chart and was certified double platinum. It also peaked at number twenty-three in New Zealand and was certified Gold. The album's second single, "Dancing with a Broken Heart" was released on 10 August 2012. It debuted and peaked at number 15 on the ARIA Singles Chart. The third single, "Wish You Were Here", was released on 12 October 2012. It debuted at number seven on the ARIA Charts and later peaked at number five, and was certified Platinum.

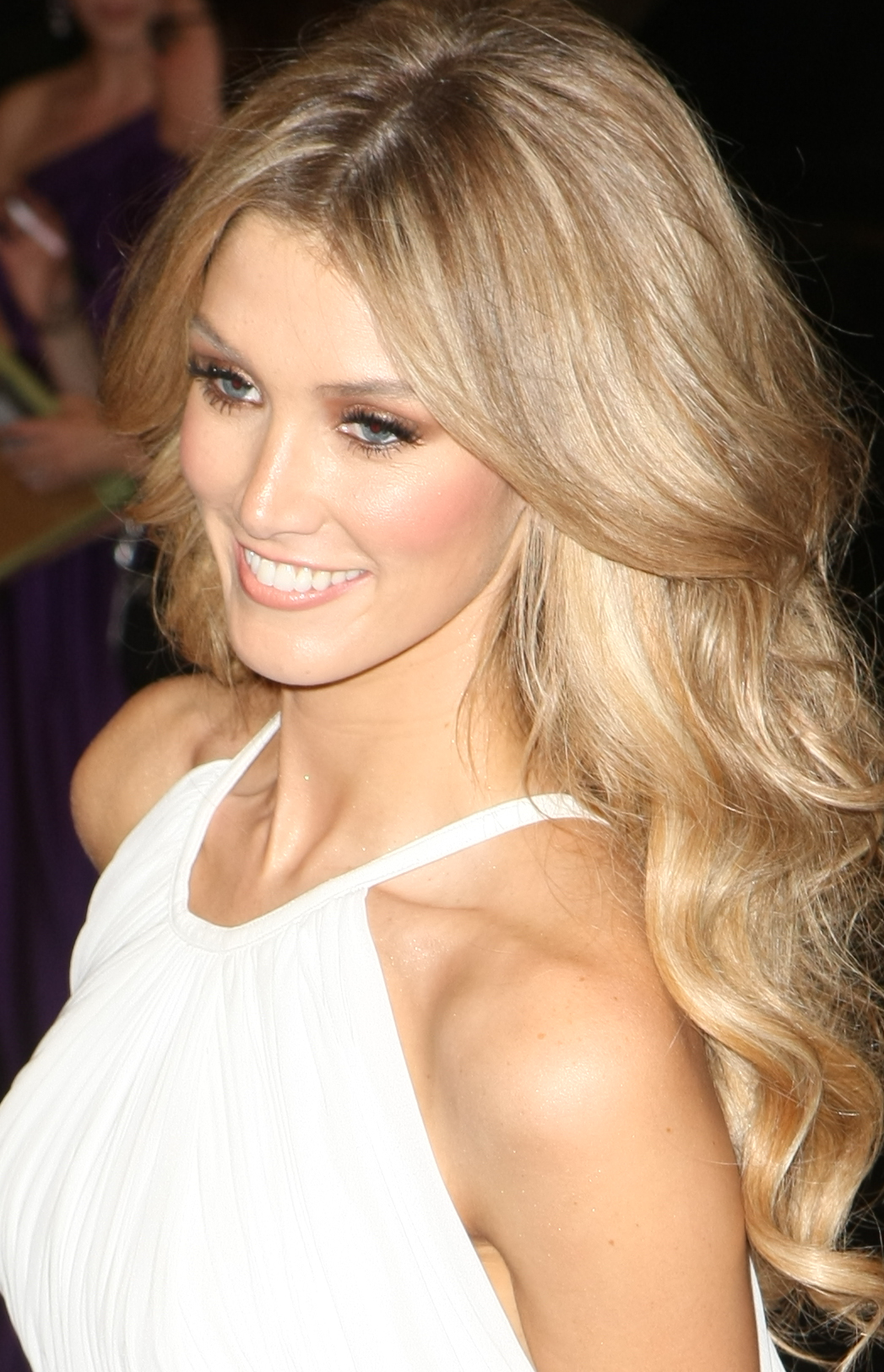
Goodrem at the 2012 Logie Awards at Crown Palladium in Melbourne, Australia

Goodrem's fourth studio album, Child of the Universe was released on 26 October 2012, which debuted at number two on the ARIA Charts and spent ten weeks in the top 50. It was certified Gold in its second with for sales of 35,000 copies. Along with the release of the album, Goodrem embarked on her tour, "An Evening with Delta: The Top of My World Shows", which supported the album release with a series of stripped-back shows, starting in Brisbane, Australia, on 27 October then two Sydney shows on 31 October 2012 and 2 November 2012 and finishing with Melbourne on 7 and 8 November 2012. Rachael Leahcar was the tour's opening act. Goodrem was featured on the album The Spirit of Christmas 2012, singing "Blue Christmas". In November, she also recorded a Christmas EP titled Christmas. It was released on 14 December 2012 in Australia and New Zealand.

On 1 February 2013, it was confirmed that Goodrem had signed with US manager Irving Azoff. Goodrem performed at the Mardi Gras in Sydney in March 2013. She performed dance version of some of her songs including "Born to Try", "Lost Without You", "Predictable", "Believe Again", "Child of the Universe" and "Sitting on Top of the World". In May 2013, Geoffrey Gurrumul Yunupingu joined Goodrem for a special performance of "Bayini" on The Voice Australia, in celebration of National Reconciliation Week. The song was later released on iTunes and debuted at number four on the ARIA Singles Chart on 10 June 2013. On 17 June 2013, Goodrem released her new single "Heart Hypnotic", which she also performed on the live finale of The Voice.

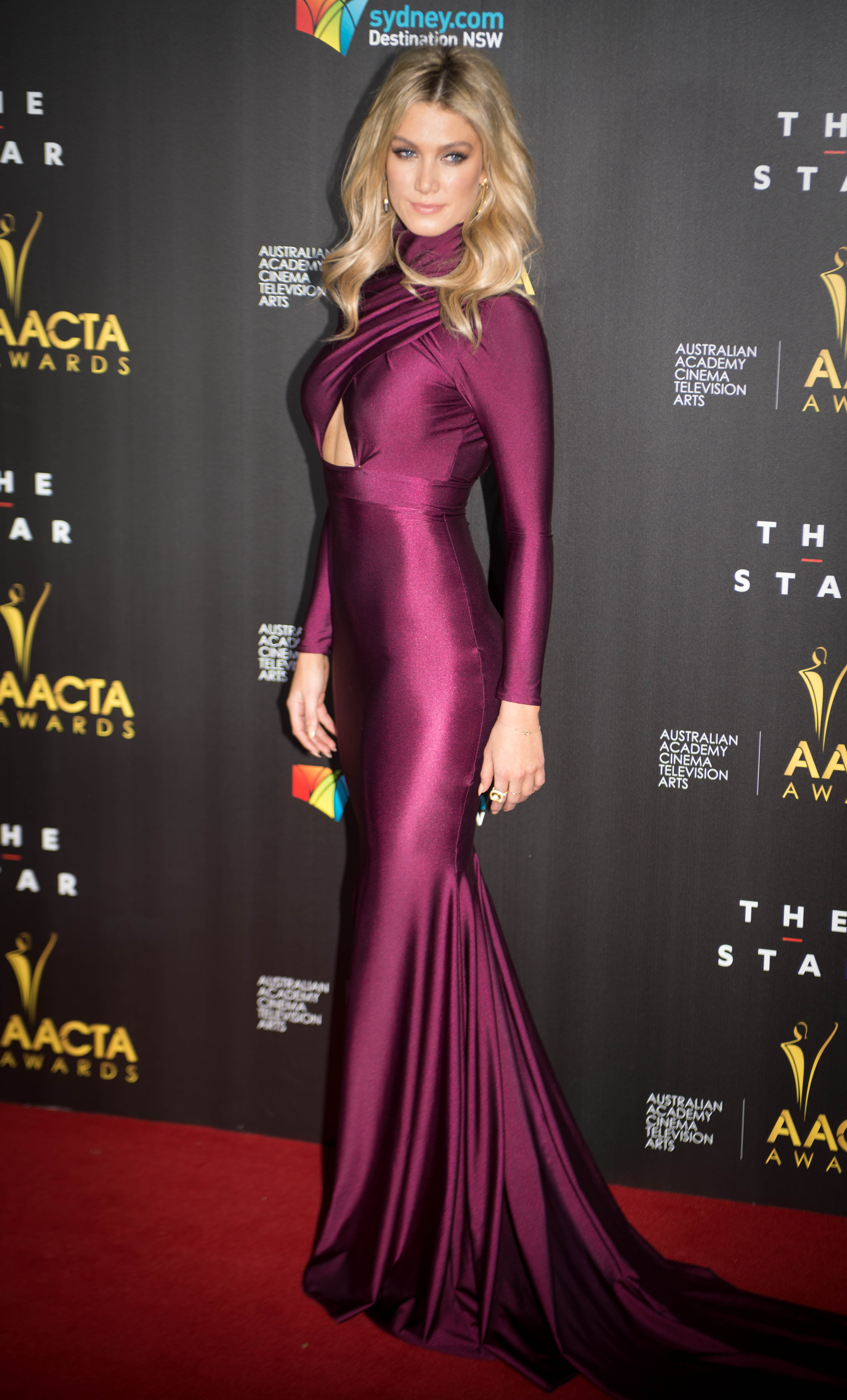
Goodrem at the 2014 AACTA Awards at The Star Event Centre, in Sydney, Australia

Goodrem celebrated 10 years since releasing her multi-platinum studio album Innocent Eyes which topped the Australian ARIA Charts and reached number two on the UK Albums Chart by releasing Innocent Eyes: Ten Year Anniversary Acoustic Edition on 29 November 2013, which debuted and peaked at number 22 on the ARIA Albums Chart. On 26 November 2013, it was announced that Goodrem would not be returning to The Voice Australia for the third season in 2014 but instead chose to be a part of the new Australian version of The Voice Kids. Goodrem revealed on her Twitter account that the decision was made because this would give her more time on her music career and more time to work on her new studio album. The show premiered on 22 June 2014 and finished on 10 August. Goodrem was a coach alongside Joel Madden, who teamed up with his brother Benji Madden, and Mel B. Goodrem coached eventual winner Alexa Curtis.

Goodrem attended the 2014 AACTA Awards where she performed "Kissing You" in tribute to Baz Luhrmann's film Romeo + Juliet (1996). Goodrem joined the Australian and New Zealand leg of Andrea Bocelli's Passion for Life Tour in September 2014. To celebrate being part of the tour, Goodrem released a cover version of Martika's 1991 single "Love... Thy Will Be Done" on 12 September 2014.

=== 2015–2019: Wings of the Wild ===
Goodrem at the 2016 Logie Awards at Crown Palladium in Melbourne, Australia

It was announced on 13 January 2015, that Goodrem was returning as a judge The Voice Australia for the show's fourth season. She was reportedly paid A$2 million per season after negotiating an increase from her initial $800,000. Goodrem continued to return as a coach yearly through the ninth season in 2020. Goodrem won both the 2016 and 2017 editions of the show with her artists Alfie Arcuri and Judah Kelly, respectively. Goodrem's single "Only Human" was released on 13 March to coincide with her return as Nina Tucker for Neighbours' 30th anniversary. She returned for three episodes starting from 16 March. Goodrem also appeared in a documentary special celebrating the anniversary titled Neighbours 30th: The Stars Reunite, which aired in Australia and the UK. She joined the Australian leg of Ricky Martin's One World Tour in April as his supporting act. She also revealed that she has been working with DNA and Jon Hume.

On 24 July 2015, Goodrem released "Wings" as the lead single from her fifth studio album Wings of the Wild. The song peaked at number one on the ARIA Charts and was certified double platinum. Goodrem also promoted the single in New Zealand and the UK. From October 2015 to February 2016, Goodrem made her musical theatre debut playing Grizabella in an Australian version of Cats. She performed the role in the Sydney, Hobart, Melbourne and Brisbane legs of the show. "Dear Life" was released on 6 May 2016 as the second single from Wings of the Wild. The single debuted and peaked at number three on the ARIA Singles Chart and was later certified Platinum. "Enough" featuring American rapper Gizzle was released as the third single on 24 June 2016 and debuted at number forty six on the ARIA Singles Chart. It later peaked at number twenty seven in its third week on the chart. Wings of the Wild was released on 1 July 2016. "The River" was later released with a story music video for the tour in September 2016, while she was in New Zealand. She toured Wings of the Wild in Australia in October and November 2016.

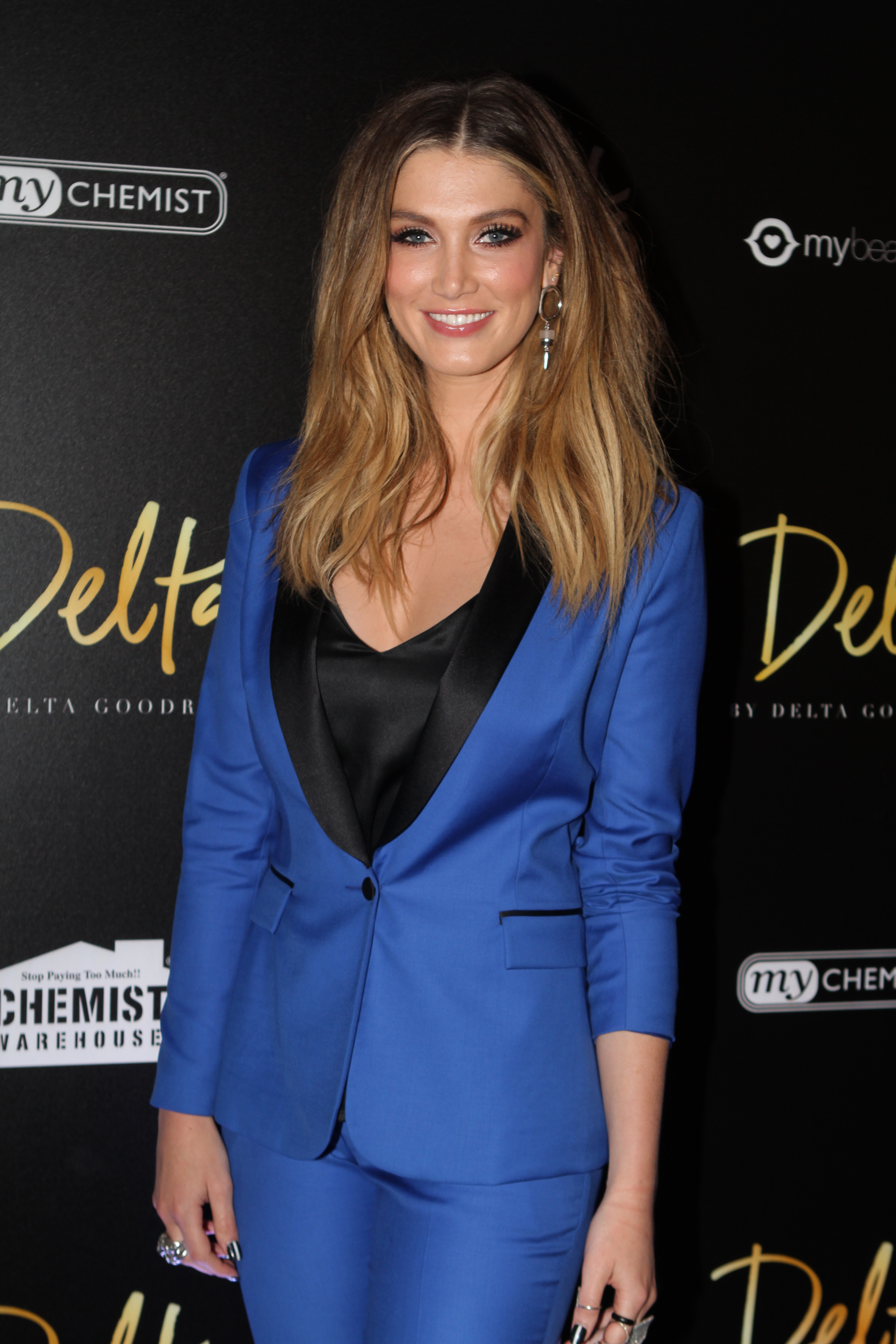
Goodrem at the launch of her fragrance, Delta, in Sydney, Australia, 2017

Goodrem made her return to television on the 2017 comedy drama series House Husbands. In 2017, she became the V8 Supercars Australia ambassador, promoting the sport and being the official performer at the racing events throughout the year.

In 2017, an advertisement for Apple Music featuring Goodrem was criticised by the Advertising Standards Bureau (ASB) for promoting unsafe driving. Complaints about the video to the bureau stated that it "does not promote safe driving" and features Goodrem placing her head and arms outside a moving a vehicle and "moving around in a motor vehicle with no clearly visible safety belt". In response to the complaints, Apple Inc. said that it felt "confident" that the advertisement did not breach the Australian Association of National Advertisers (AANA) Advertiser Code of Ethics standards and saw no issues relating to car safety, with both individuals in the car wearing lap seat belts. The ASB said that people may not realise that vintage cars are fitted with lap seatbelts which are not clearly seen in the video. The advertisement was pulled from screening and would not re-air until Apple re-edited it with all parts featuring Goodrem's arms and hands outside of the car window removed.

On 15 February 2018, Goodrem released a single, "Think About You", which was also released for streaming and download on her website on 16 February 2018. The song was written by Goodrem in collaboration with songwriters Julian Bunetta and John Ryan. "Think About You" is described as being a "feel good, upbeat song with an irresistible catchy groove", yet is also noted for its cheeky sexualised lyrics that earned it to be called a "sexy upbeat banger" by reviewers. Goodrem reinvented her look which included colouring her hair darker for this promotional video.

Goodrem played Olivia Newton-John in the Newton-John biopic called Olivia Newton-John: Hopelessly Devoted to You and released a covers soundtrack album called I Honestly Love You in May 2018.

=== 2020–2022: Bridge over Troubled Dreams ===
Goodrem performing "Kids" with Robbie Williams at the 2022 AFL Grand Final in Melbourne, Australia

In January 2020, Goodrem released a charity single, "Let It Rain", in aid of the 2019–2020 bushfires in Australia. She was inspired to write "Let It Rain" after seeing the devastation from the bushfires across Australia. She teamed with Apple Music, Sony Music and iHeartRadio for the release. All proceeds went to aid Red Cross bushfire relief.

Goodrem released the singles "Keep Climbing" and "Paralyzed" in May and July 2020, respectively. Additionally, she announced the Bridge Over Troubled Dreams Tour of Australia and New Zealand, scheduled to begin in March 2022. She had to cancel the New Zealand portion of the tour for COVID-19 related reasons on 2 March 2022. Goodrem officially started the tour in March 2022 and at the Brisbane performance some of it was recorded for a Red Cross appeal (Australia Unites: Red Cross Flood Appeal) It was received well and called "simply Delta Goodrem's best tour yet. She's taken elements of things she's learnt from every tour in the past, and curated a night full of euphoric highs and big singalong's for pop fans who've been longing to be inside an arena together again". She then took the tour to Europe in October 2022 for sold-out shows in the UK and Germany.

On 12 November 2020, with no prior announcement and despite teasing an album of original material, Goodrem released her sixth studio album and first Christmas album, Only Santa Knows. To support the album, Goodrem announced her own Christmas special Christmas with Delta, which aired on Nine Network on 12 December. She did a second show in 2021 set in Luna Park Sydney for the deluxe edition re-release of the project She did a third concert with a tribute to Olivia Newton-John in 2022.

In early 2021, Goodrem announced the release of her seventh studio album Bridge over Troubled Dreams for May of that year, alongside an autobiographical and photographic book bearing the same name. Throughout Australia's COVID-19 response, Goodrem spent most of 2020 and 2021 doing The Bunkerdown Sessions, a livestream concert series for fans through her Instagram and Facebook pages. In December 2021, Goodrem took issue with an Instagram post by NSW Health, who later apologised, that used her image with two needles pointing at her head to personify the Delta variant in an effort to advertise the booster vaccine.

In June 2022, Goodrem announced she was opening for the Backstreet Boys on the second North American leg of their DNA World Tour. On 28 July 2022, Goodrem made a brief appearance as Nina Tucker in Neighbours: The Finale. On 24 September 2022, Goodrem joined English singer Robbie Williams at the 2022 AFL Grand Final to perform his Kylie Minogue duet "Kids".

=== 2023–present: Going independent, Eurovision Song Contest, and Pure ===
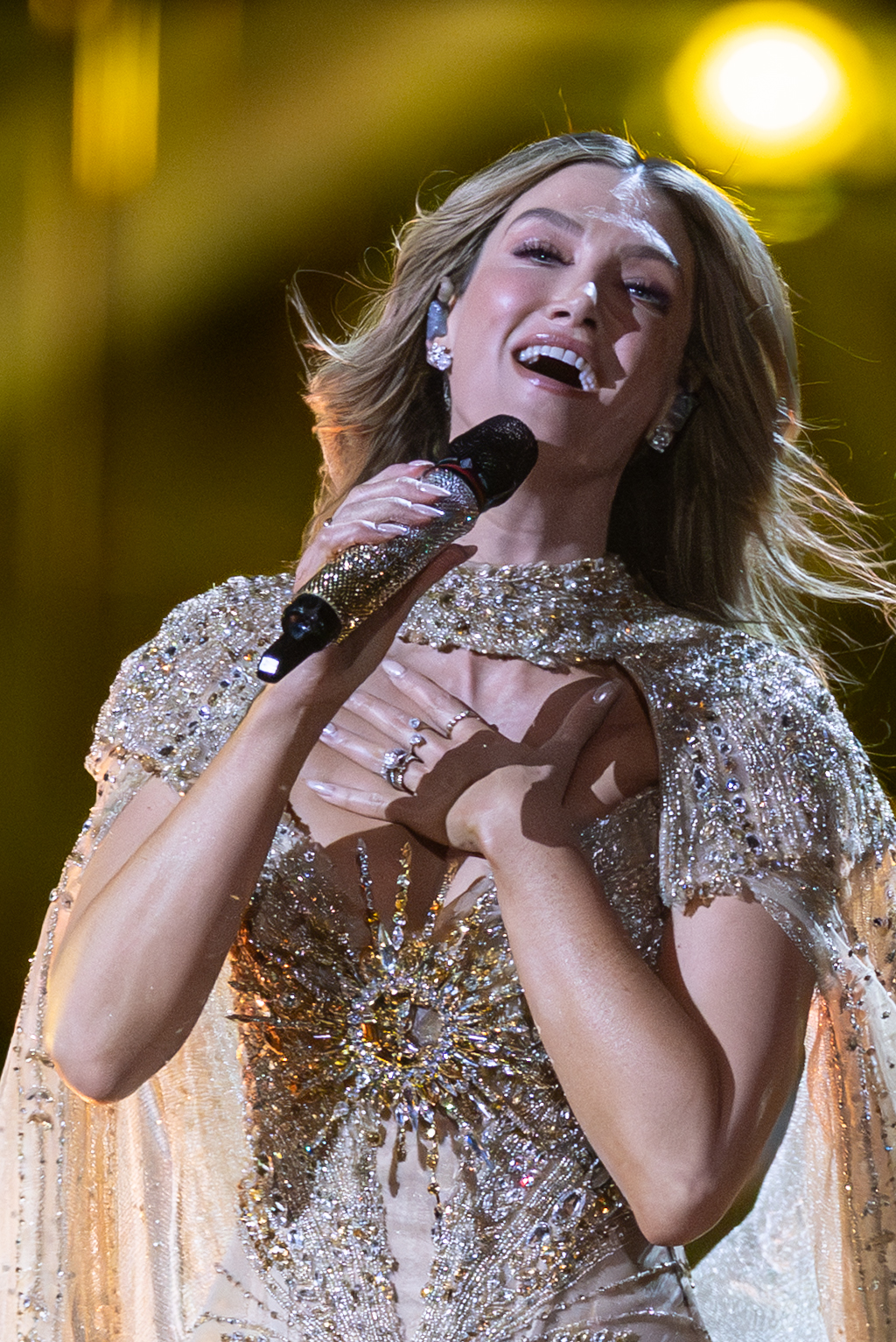
Goodrem performing "Eclipse" at the Eurovision Song Contest 2026 in Vienna, Austria

On 18 July 2023, Goodrem announced her new single, "Back to Your Heart" would be released on 4 August, under her own record imprint, ATLED Records. This marked the end of her music contract with Sony Music. In August and September 2023, Goodrem embarked on her Hearts on the Run tour, her first headlining tour of Europe. As part of the tour, Goodrem performed shows in the United Kingdom, Ireland, Germany, France, Switzerland, Denmark, Norway and Sweden. In September she returned to Australia to embark on a 20th anniversary tour for her debut album Innocent Eyes. On 28 September 2023, Goodrem starred as the lead role in the Netflix film, Love Is in the Air, shot in Queensland's Whitsunday Islands. In its first two weeks, the movie had been streamed 20 million times.

In April 2024, she released a further single "Hearts on the Run", and in June, returned to the UK and Ireland to support Shania Twain and perform at London's Mighty Hoopla festival. In April and May 2025, she performed shows in Sydney and London to celebrate the 20th anniversary of her second studio album Mistaken Identity.

On 1 March 2026, the Special Broadcasting Service (SBS) announced that she would represent Australia in the Eurovision Song Contest 2026 in Vienna, Austria, with the song "Eclipse". The single was released on the same day. Goodrem finished in fourth place in the final with 287 points, marking the country's second best result in the contest's history. She was awarded the Media Award category in the Marcel Bezençon Awards. In September 2026, Goodrem began competing as a contestant on the twenty-fourth series of the British dance competition TV series Strictly Come Dancing, the original edition of Dancing with the Stars. but gained a rib injury, and was eliminated. Goodrem's eighth studio album, Pure, is scheduled for release on 6 November 2026. The album's first single, "Hologram", was released on 26 June 2026. "Warrior" was released as the second single on 28 August 2026. Pure album was rescheduled to 5 February 2027.

On 19 September 2026, Goodrem was paired with Kai Widdrington during the launch show of Strictly Come Dancing, series 24.

== Personal life ==
=== Health ===
In July 2003, at the age of 18, Goodrem was diagnosed with Hodgkin lymphoma, a cancer that develops in the lymphatic system. She was forced to put all working commitments on hold while undertaking treatment for the disease. In a 2004 interview with The Australian Women's Weekly, Goodrem revealed that, since 2002, she had suffered from a head-to-toe rash, fatigue, weight loss, night sweats, and a lump on her neck. "I was doing sit-ups when I felt something pop in my neck. I reached down and I felt a small lump at the base of my throat. It wasn't sore, it wasn't visible, but I could feel it." As part of her treatment, Goodrem undertook chemotherapy, which resulted in the loss of her hair, and radiation therapy.

In August 2020, Goodrem released a six-minute video detailing the back story behind her song "Paralyzed". In the video, she revealed that after having her salivary gland removed, she faced serious complications that led to the paralysis of a nerve in her tongue, which left her having to re-learn to speak.

=== Relationships ===
Some time in 2002, Goodrem dated fellow Neighbours cast member Blair McDonough. In 2004, Goodrem began a nine-month relationship with Australian tennis player Mark Philippoussis. Her comeback single, "Out of the Blue", was written about his support during her cancer battle. Later in 2004, Goodrem began dating former Westlife singer Brian McFadden after collaborating on the duet "Almost Here". They became engaged, but ended their relationship in April 2011. From May 2011 to February 2012, Goodrem dated Nick Jonas of the Jonas Brothers.

Goodrem has been in a relationship with fellow musician Matthew Copley since late 2016, and in September 2023, they announced their engagement. In June 2025, the couple married in Malta.

== Legacy and artistry ==
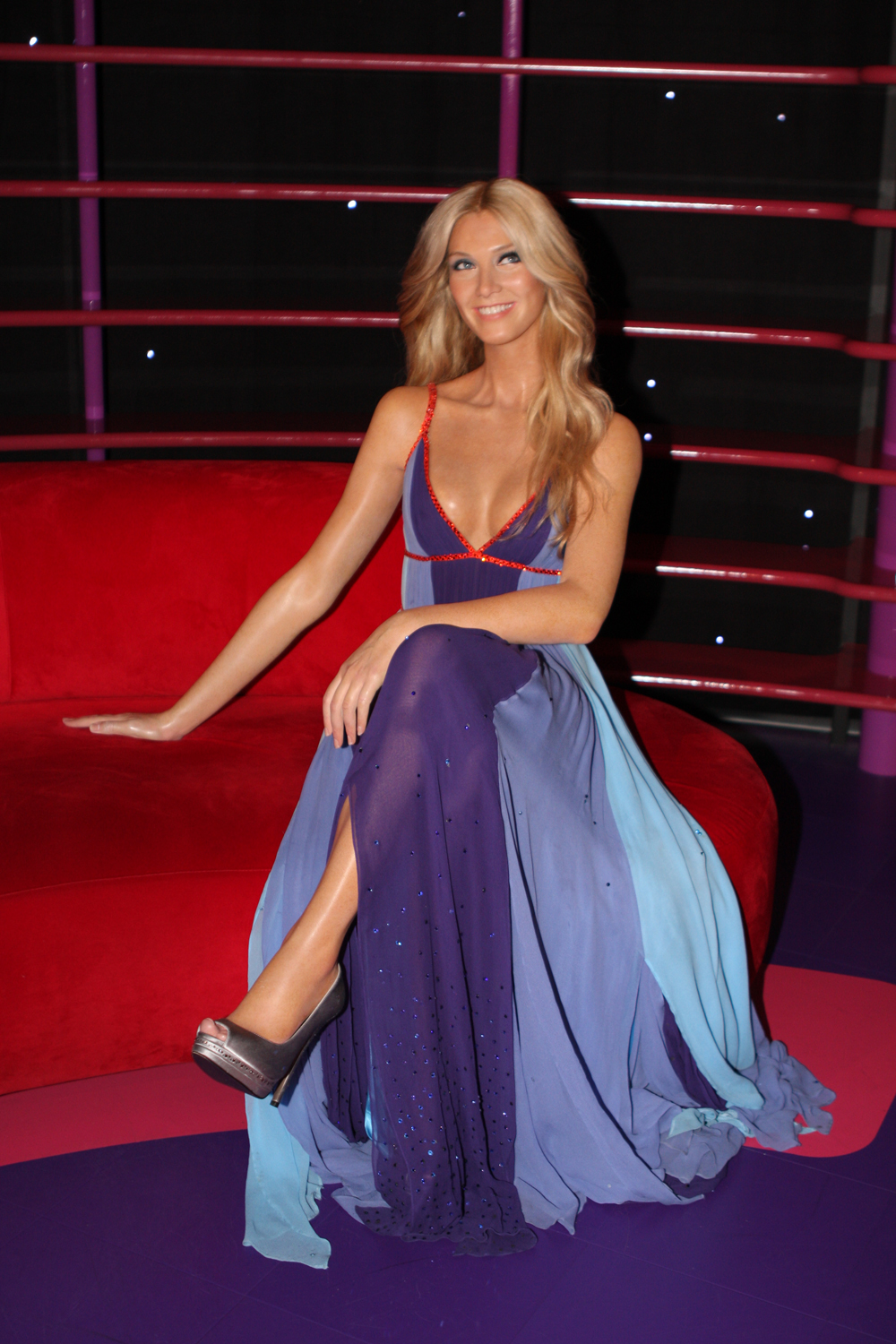
A wax figure of Goodrem at Madame Tussauds Sydney in Sydney, Australia

Goodrem's repertoire falls under the pop and adult contemporary styles, and heavily features the piano, which she usually plays barefoot while performing live. She is known for her soprano voice, which in a review of Delta was described as crystalline, fierce and illuminating in quality.

In 2022, Goodrem was appointed a Member of the Order of Australia (AM) in the 2022 Australia Day Honours for "significant service to the not-for-profit sector, and to the performing arts". Goodrem was honoured with a wax figure at Madame Tussauds in Sydney's Darling Harbour, which opened in April 2012.

Goodrem has endorsed many products such as the Wii, Sanitarium, So Good, Nesquik, Sunsilk and Pepsi. She has also released an underwear range, Delta by Anabella (Briefly 2004–2006) and a self-titled perfume in April 2017, which by June that same year had sold 30,000 bottles and made $1 million in sales. This was followed by fragrances "Dream" in 2018, "Destiny" in 2019, "Power" in 2022, "Power Intense" in 2023, Delta, Delta Night and Delta Bloom came later on.

Her debut studio album, Innocent Eyes (2003), made her one of Australia's highest-selling female recording artists, spending 29 weeks at No. 1, selling over 1.2 million copies in Australia and another 4.5 million internationally, debuting at number 2 in the UK and breaking various records in the process.

Goodrem has a total of five number-one albums, and a further three top-five albums, nine number-one singles and 17 top-ten singles on the ARIA Singles Chart. She has sold over nine million albums globally.

== Charity work ==
Goodrem is a long-standing supporter of various charities and foundations, serving as patron of The Kinghorn Cancer Centre, Sydney (a joint venture between St Vincent's Hospital and the Garvan Institute of Medical Research) and an ambassador for Starlight Children's Foundation, Make-A-Wish Foundation and Sony Foundation Australia.

In May 2005, Goodrem helped launch "Teen Info on Cancer", a UK website aimed at supporting young teenage sufferers. In November 2005, Goodrem became an ambassador for Research Australia's "Thank You Day", which honours the country's health and medical researchers and received a Thank You Day Celebrity Advocacy Award "in recognition of her efforts in raising funds and awareness for Australian medical research and charities".

In 2007 Goodrem was the face of Alternative Hair, in aid of cancer charity Leukaemia Research. Goodrem is also a member of RADD (Recording Artists, Actors And Athletes Against Drink Driving), a group of celebrities raising awareness of the risks of drunk driving. In 2011, Goodrem became an ambassador for The Kinghorn Cancer Centre, Sydney.

On 27 October 2017, she was featured on a cover of the Beatles' "With a Little Help from My Friends", to raise money for the Sony Foundation's project Friends4Youth.

In 2020, Goodrem released a charity single titled "Let It Rain", and also performed as part of three major charity concerts, Fire Fight Australia to raise funds for the 2019–2020 Australia bushfire crisis, as well as One World: Together at Home and Music from the Home Front to raise money in support of the COVID-19 pandemic. In October of the same year, Goodrem participated in the 20th year of Ralph Lauren's Pink Pony campaign to raise money for cancer care and research. In the same month, Goodrem partnered with Remembering Wildlife to help raise funds for cheetah conservation efforts.

In June 2020, Goodrem launched the Delta Goodrem Foundation in partnership with St. Vincent's Hospital and The Kinghorn Cancer Centre. The foundation aims to raise funds for the acceleration of innovative blood cancer research. In July 2022, the Delta Goodrem Foundation partnered with Revlon in donating portions of lipstick sales to cancer charity Look Good Feel Better.

== Discography ==
- Innocent Eyes (2003)
- Mistaken Identity (2004)
- Delta (2007)
- Child of the Universe (2012)
- Wings of the Wild (2016)
- Only Santa Knows (2020)
- Bridge over Troubled Dreams (2021)
- Pure (2027)

== Tours ==
Headlining tours

- The Visualise Tour (2005)
- Believe Again Tour (2009)
- An Evening with Delta: The Top of My World Shows (2012)
- Wings of the Wild Tour (2016)
- Bridge over Troubled Dreams Tour (2022)
- Hearts On the Run Tour (2023)
- Innocent Eyes 20th Anniversary Tour (2023)
- Mistaken Identity – A Night of Celebration (2025)
- Pure Prelude (2026)
- Pure World Tour (2027)

== Filmography ==
=== Film and television ===
Year	Title	Role	Notes
1993	Hey Dad..!	Cynthia Broadhurst	Guest role; "The Real Ladies Man"
1993	A Country Practice	Georgina Bailey	Guest role; "Little Lies, Part 1" and "Little Lies, Part 2"
1995	Police Rescue	Sophie Harris	Guest role; "Conduct Endangering Life"
2002–2005, 2015, 2022	Neighbours	Nina Tucker	Regular role; 144 episodes
2005	Hating Alison Ashley	Alison Ashley	Film, main role
2005	North Shore	Taylor Ward	Guest role; "The Ex-Games" and "The End"
2011	Santa's Apprentice	Little Beatrice	Film, voice role
2017	House Husbands	Izzy Dreyfus	3 episodes, season 5
2018	Olivia: Hopelessly Devoted to You	Olivia Newton-John	Miniseries
2023	Love is in the Air	Dana Randall	Film, main role

=== Self–appearances ===
Year	Title	Role	Notes
2003	Skithouse	Herself	Guest appearance
2003	Live @ Channel V	Herself	Guest performance
2008	Backyard Blitz	Herself	Guest appearance
2009, 2024	Australian Idol	Herself	Guest judge and performer
2012–2013, 2015–2020	The Voice	Herself	Coach and performer
2012	Take Two with Phineas and Ferb	Herself	Guest interviewee
2014	The Voice Kids	Herself	Coach and performer
2015	Neighbours 30th: The Stars Reunite	Herself	Documentary
2016	Who Do You Think You Are?	Herself	Documentary
2016	Play School	Herself	Guest presenter
2020	Fire Fight Australia	Herself	Performer
2020	Together at Home	Herself	Performer
2020	Music from the Home Front	Herself	Co-host and performer
2020	2020 ARIA Music Awards	Herself	Host
2020–present	Christmas with Delta	Herself	Host and performer
2021–2022	Australia Day Live Concert	Herself	Performer (and 2022 co–host)
2021	The Celebrity Apprentice Australia	Herself	Guest appearance
2021	The Block	Herself	Guest appearance
2022	Hey Hey, It's 100 Years	Herself	Guest appearance
2022	Luxe Listings Sydney	Herself	Guest appearance
2022	Lego Masters Australia	Herself	Guest appearance
2023	Isle of MTV	Herself	Performer
2024	The Assembly	Herself	Guest interviewee
2024	Headliners	Herself	Guest mentor
2025	Selling Sunset	Herself	Guest appearance
2026	Eurovision Song Contest 2026	Herself	Australian entrant
2026	Strictly Come Dancing	Herself	Contestant; series 24
2026	The Voice UK	Herself	Battle advisor for Team Kelly; series 14
2026	The Voice of Germany	Herself	Guest coach; season 16

== Stage roles ==
Year	Title	Role
2015–2016	Cats	Grizabella

== Books ==
Year	Title	Type
2021	Bridge over Troubled Dreams	Autobiography and photography

== Awards and recognitions ==
Awards and achievements
Preceded by Go-Jo with "Milkshake Man"	Australia in the Eurovision Song Contest; 2026	Succeeded by TBD
