= Lost Without You (Delta Goodrem song) =

2003 single by Delta Goodrem

Single by Delta Goodrem

from the album Innocent Eyes
- B-side: "In My Own Time"; "Hear Me Calling"
- Released: 3 March 2003
- Studio: The Lab (Santa Monica, California)
- Length: 4:10 (original); 3:25 (US version)
- Label: Epic; Columbia
- Songwriters: Matthew Gerrard; Bridget Benenate
- Producer: Matthew Gerrard

Delta Goodrem singles chronology
"Born to Try" (2002)	"Lost Without You" (2003)	"Innocent Eyes" (2003)

Music video
- "Lost Without You" on YouTube

"Lost Without You" is a song written by Matthew Gerrard and Bridget Benenate, produced by Gerrard for the Australian singer Delta Goodrem's debut studio album, Innocent Eyes (2003). The song was released as the album's second single on 3 March 2003. It became Goodrem's second number-one single in Australia and also peaked within the top 10 in New Zealand, Spain, Sweden, and the United Kingdom. Goodrem re-mixed and recorded the song for the United States; it was released to American adult contemporary radio on 27 June 2005.

== Chart performance ==
"Lost Without You" was released to Australian radio in early February 2003 and was the most added song to radio for that week. Following its CD single release on 3 March 2003, The song debuted on the Australian ARIA Singles Chart on 10 March at number one, knocking "Beautiful" by Christina Aguilera off the top spot. It was certified gold in its first week by ARIA and it became Goodrem's second consecutive number-one single. In its second week in the charts, it was knocked off the number-one spot by "All the Things She Said" by t.A.T.u., but then in its third week it re-gained the number-one spot spending a total of two weeks at the peak. It was then knocked off the top again by "All the Things She Said". The week after it was replaced by 50 Cent's "In da Club". Notably, it was Goodrem's first of four number-one singles in Australia that year alone. "Lost Without You" spent twelve weeks in the top ten, eighteen weeks in the top fifty, thirty-two weeks in the top one hundred, was certified double platinum by ARIA and was the seventh highest selling single in Australia for 2003. The song debuted at number thirty-one on the New Zealand RIANZ Singles Chart on 29 June 2003. It took eleven weeks to get to its peak position of four and it spent nineteen weeks in the charts.

The song debuted on the UK Singles Chart on 23 June 2003 at number four, making the song Goodrem's second top ten single there. It stayed in the top ten for three weeks and in the top seventy-five for eleven weeks. In Ireland the song debuted and peaked at number fifteen, stayed there for two weeks and spent thirteen weeks in the charts. The song debuted on the U.S. Billboard Hot Adult Contemporary Tracks on 7 July 2005 at number thirty-six. It took the song eleven weeks to peak at its peak position of eighteen and it spent twenty weeks in the charts. She performed the song at the World Music Awards in 2005.

== Music videos ==
There were two music videos to help promote the song – the first video was released around the world and the second video was released only in the United States. The first video was directed by Katie Bell and filmed in Roehampton, London, and was released on 17 February 2003. Goodrem states "It's a nice step from the last video. It's kind of a little bit more relaxed. We hung a little bit looser and freer on this one. The other one looks really kind of serious and I actually jump around a lot more than what people think. Just the atmosphere and everything about the clip - I'm really happy with it". This version shows Goodrem entering a living room in her home and upon her entrance, she lights up the room and begins playing the parts of the song on the piano. As the song progresses, she reminisces the many times she has spent with her friends. Some scenes also show Delta in her room, where she is still reminiscent of those times. The video, behind the scenes, is available on Goodrem's first DVD Delta (2003).

The second video was filmed in California and was released in the U.S. in August 2005. The music video is set on a beach, where Goodrem plays the parts on the piano and the colour scheme is in black and white. This video also shows Goodrem with a man, hugging and walking towards each other. There are only a few differences between these two versions of the song: the length and vocals. In the first video, the instruments are played mildly, while in the second video, the instruments are played slightly stronger.

== Track listings ==
Australian CD single
No.	Title	Writer(s)	Length
1.	"Lost Without You"	Matthew Gerrard, Bridget Benenate
2.	"Lost Without You" (acoustic)	Gerrard, Benenate
3.	"In My Own Time"	Delta Goodrem

UK CD1
No.	Title	Writer(s)	Length
1.	"Lost Without You" (album version)	Gerrard, Benenate	4:10
2.	"Lost Without You" (acoustic)	Gerrard, Benenate	4:08
3.	"In My Own Time"	Goodrem	4:06
4.	"Lost Without You" (video)	Gerrard, Benenate	4:12

UK CD2
No.	Title	Writer(s)	Length
1.	"Lost Without You" (album version)	Gerrard, Benenate	4:10
2.	"Hear Me Calling" (album version)	Goodrem, Vince Pizzinga	4:15
3.	"Lost Without You" (Smash N Grab Remix)	Gerrard, Benenate	4:05

UK cassette single
No.	Title	Writer(s)	Length
1.	"Lost Without You" (album version)	Gerrard, Benenate	4:11
2.	"In My Own Time" (album version)	Goodrem	4:06

European CD single
No.	Title	Writer(s)	Length
1.	"Lost Without You" (album version)	Gerrard, Benenate	4:11
2.	"Hear Me Calling"	Goodrem, Pizzinga	4:15

== Credits and personnel ==
Credits are lifted from the Innocent Eyes album booklet.

Studios

- Recorded at The Lab (Santa Monica, California)
- Mastered at Sterling Sound (New York City)

Personnel

- Matthew Gerrard – writing, all instruments, programming, production, arrangement
- Bridget Benenate – writing, backing vocals
- David Nicholas – recording (vocals)
- Chong Lim – recording (vocals)
- Michael H. Brauer – mixing
- Greg Calbi – mastering

== Charts ==
=== Weekly charts ===
Chart (2003–2005)	Peak position
Australia (ARIA)	1
Austria (Ö3 Austria Top 40)	14
CIS Airplay (TopHit)	13
Europe (Eurochart Hot 100)	15
Germany (GfK)	27
Greece (IFPI)	20
Ireland (IRMA)	15
Netherlands (Dutch Top 40)	35
Netherlands (Single Top 100)	46
New Zealand (Recorded Music NZ)	4
Russia Airplay (TopHit)	48
Scotland Singles (Official Charts)	4
Spain (Promusicae)	10
Sweden (Sverigetopplistan)	9
Switzerland (Schweizer Hitparade)	47
UK Singles (Official Charts)	4
US Adult Contemporary (Billboard)	18

=== Year-end charts ===
Chart (2003)	Position
Australia (ARIA)	7
CIS Airplay (TopHit)	27
Ireland (IRMA)	95
New Zealand (RIANZ)	21
Russia Airplay (TopHit)	107
UK Singles (OCC)	79

Chart (2004)	Position
Austria (Ö3 Austria Top 40)	73
Sweden (Hitlistan)	90

Chart (2005)	Position
US Adult Contemporary (Billboard)	37

=== Decade-end charts ===
Chart (2000–2009)	Position
Australia (ARIA)	69
Australian Artists (ARIA)	12

== Certifications and sales ==
Region	Certification	Certified units/sales
Australia (ARIA)	2× Platinum	140,000^{^}
United Kingdom	—	85,000
^{^} Shipments figures based on certification alone.

== Release history ==
Region	Date	Format(s)	Label(s)	Catalogue	Ref.
Australia	3 March 2003	CD	Epic	673545.2	
United Kingdom	16 June 2003	CD: CD1	Epic	673955 1	
United Kingdom	16 June 2003	CD: CD2	Epic	673955 2	
United States	27 June 2005	Adult contemporary radio	Epic; Columbia	CSK 51182	

== Cover versions ==
The song was covered by Darren Hayes during the ARIA Awards Ceremony in 2003, due to Goodrem being too ill to perform. Contemporary Christian artist Jaci Velasquez has also recorded a cover version. In this version the lyrics of the song have been revised to tell of a dependence upon God, as opposed to a lover, as in the original. The song features on her album Unspoken (2003).
