= Born to Try =

2002 single by Delta Goodrem

Single by Delta Goodrem

from the album Innocent Eyes
- B-side: "Longer"; "In My Own Time"
- Released: 11 November 2002
- Studio: Cove City Sound (Glen Cove, New York)
- Genre: Pop
- Length: 4:13
- Label: Epic
- Songwriters: Delta Goodrem; Audius Mtawarira
- Producer: Ric Wake

Delta Goodrem singles chronology
"I Don't Care" (2001)	"Born to Try" (2002)	"Lost Without You" (2003)

Music video
- "Born to Try" on YouTube

"Born to Try" is a song by Australian singer-songwriter Delta Goodrem, written by Goodrem and Audius Mtawarira and produced by Ric Wake for Goodrem's debut studio album, Innocent Eyes (2003). The song was released as the first single off the studio album on 11 November 2002 by Epic Records. It was later featured on her first Japanese compilation album Innocent Eyes (2006). The song was co-written by her while she was staying at her home in Sydney, Australia, for the production of the studio album, as well as written and producing four other songs together.

As the song features instrumentation with a piano, guitars (acoustic and electric) and drums, the song is a low tempo pop song, with influences of piano pop and pop rock. Lyrically, the song is about taking chances and leading one's independence. The song was universally praised from music critics, praising Goodrem's vocal abilities and lyrical content. The song is considered as Goodrem's signature song, as it charted in several countries worldwide, including Australia and New Zealand, where it reached number one. The song also peaked at number three in the United Kingdom, her first single to chart outside the Oceania. It also charted in many European countries including Ireland, Switzerland and Germany.

An accompanying music video was shot featuring Goodrem near a lake and mountains, then sees her in various locations in and around downtown Helsinki, which was presented with timelapse effects. The music video was featured on her video compilation Delta and was performed at both her commercially successful tours; Visualise Australian Tour and Believe Again Australian Tour.

== Background and composition ==
Before this song or the album Innocent Eyes had even commenced, when Delta Goodrem was 15, she got signed a record deal with Sony Music and began work on an album of pop-dance songs including the unsuccessful debut single "I Don't Care". The album and proposed second single "A Year Ago Today" were pushed aside as a result, allowing Goodrem and Sony to re-evaluate her future musical direction.

In 2002, Goodrem starred on Australian TV series Neighbours as a shy school girl and aspiring singer Nina Tucker. The song was eventually performed on an episode on Neighbours. The song was co-written by Goodrem along with songwriter Audius Mtawarira at her home in Sydney. The two originally met in 2001 and Goodrem states "Audius and I got on really well and someone at the record company suggested we write together. He came out to our house, mum made some lunch and we wrote four songs. 'Born To Try' was the last one. We just naturally clicked and there was no pressure so it was just music for music's sake".

Musically, "Born to Try" is a lowtempo pop song, with influences of piano pop and pop rock. The song fuses instrumentations including piano, guitars (acoustic and electric) and drums. According to the sheet music published at Musicnotes.com by Sony/ATV Music Publishing, the song is written in the key of A♭ major. The song's beat is set in common time, and moves at a tempo of 66 beats per minute. Goodrem's vocals span from the note of F3 to the note of Ab5.

== Reception ==
"Born to Try" was praised by certain music critics. Matthew Chisling from Allmusic said, along with "Longer" and "Innocent Eyes"; "[...] are pop gems in purest form." The song was highlighted as a standout from the album. Caroline Sullivan from The Guardian said the song along with the album's lyrical content "[...] are a bit la-la-floating-on-clouds, but that doesn't dilute their charm." The song received many accolades from many nominations. The song won two awards at the ARIA Music Awards; both for Best Single and Best Breakthrough Artist. The song had won the International Viewers' Choice Award at the MTV Video Music Awards in 2003. The Video Hits show won the Video of the Year award.

Commercially, the song was successful and has been known as Goodrem's signature song. The song debuted at number three on the Australian Singles Chart, and eventually peaked at number one for a sole week. The song spent a total of twenty-two weeks in the charts and was certified triple-platinum by the Australian Recording Industry Association (ARIA), selling over 220,114 copies in that country. After the releases of her other singles off the album, which subsequently peaked at number one, it gave her a record for becoming the first ever artist to have five number-one singles from a debut album. It spent three months in the top five and ranked within the top 10 of the Australian year-end charts for both 2002 and 2003. The song debuted at number forty-nine on the New Zealand Singles Chart, and rose to number five. After 14 weeks, it managed to peak at number one, making it her first and only number one in that country. It stayed in the charts for twenty-four weeks and was certified gold by Recording Industry Association of New Zealand (RIANZ), selling over 7,500 copies.

The song had less success in Europe, where it peaked at fifty-eight in Switzerland, where it stayed in the charts for six weeks. It also peaked at eighteen in The Netherlands, staying in the charts for twelve weeks. It was successful in the UK Singles Chart, where it debuted at number three, a high peak for Goodrem and stayed in the charts for thirteen weeks.

== Track listings ==
Australian CD single
No.	Title	Writer(s)	Length
1.	"Born to Try"	Delta Goodrem, Audius Mtawarira	4:13
2.	"Born to Try" (Graham Stack remix)	Goodrem, Mtawarira	4:14
3.	"Born to Try" (original demo)	Goodrem, Mtawarira	4:14
Total length:			12:41

UK CD1
No.	Title	Writer(s)	Length
1.	"Born to Try" (radio edit)	Goodrem, Mtawarira	3:51
2.	"Born to Try" (Mash Master mix)	Goodrem, Mtawarira	6:28
3.	"Longer" (album version)	Goodrem, Gary Barlow, Eliot Kennedy, Tim Woodcock	3:39
4.	"Born to Try" (video)	Goodrem, Mtawarira
Total length:			14:18

UK CD2
No.	Title	Writer(s)	Length
1.	"Born to Try" (album version)	Goodrem, Mtawarira	4:13
2.	"Born to Try" (original demo)	Goodrem, Mtawarira	4:14
3.	"In My Own Time"	Goodrem	4:07
Total length:			12:34

UK cassette single and European CD single
No.	Title	Writer(s)	Length
1.	"Born to Try" (radio edit)	Goodrem, Mtawarira	3:51
2.	"Longer" (album version)	Goodrem, Barlow, Kennedy, Woodcock	3:39
Total length:			7:30

== Credits and personnel ==
Credits are lifted from the Innocent Eyes album booklet.

Studios

- Recorded at Cove City Sound Studios (Glen Cove, New York)
- Mastered at Sterling Sound (New York City)

Personnel

- Delta Goodrem – writing
- Audius Mtawarira – writing
- Russ DeSalvo – guitars, synths, arrangement
- Patrick Carroll – bass, percussion programming
- Richard Sanford – piano
- Frank Vilardi – drums
- Ric Wake – production, arrangement
- Bob Cadway – recording
- DUG – recording (guitars)
- Michael H. Brauer – mixing
- Jim Annunziato – assistant engineering
- Mark Russell – production coordination
- Greg Calbi – mastering

== Charts ==
=== Weekly charts ===
Chart (2002–2004)	Peak position
Australia (ARIA)	1
Canada AC Top 30 (Radio & Records)	18
Europe (European Hot 100)	11
Germany (GfK)	61
Ireland (IRMA)	13
Netherlands (Dutch Top 40)	15
Netherlands (Single Top 100)	18
New Zealand (Recorded Music NZ)	1
Scotland Singles (OCC)	2
Switzerland (Schweizer Hitparade)	58
UK Singles (OCC)	3

=== Year-end charts ===
Chart (2002)	Position
Australia (ARIA)	7

Chart (2003)	Position
Australia (ARIA)	4
New Zealand (RIANZ)	5
UK Singles (OCC)	41

=== Decade-end charts ===
Chart (2000–2009)	Position
Australia (ARIA)	19
Australian Artists (ARIA)	4

== Certifications and sales ==
Region	Certification	Certified units/sales
Australia (ARIA)	4× Platinum	280,000^{‡}
New Zealand (RMNZ)	Gold	5,000^{*}
United Kingdom (BPI)	Silver	200,000^{‡}
^{*} Sales figures based on certification alone.^{‡} Sales+streaming figures based on certification alone.

== Release history ==
Region	Date	Format(s)	Label(s)	Ref.
Australia	11 November 2002	Epic	CD	
United Kingdom	10 March 2003	Epic	CD; cassette	
