= Predictable (Delta Goodrem song) =

2003 single by Delta Goodrem

Single by Delta Goodrem

from the album Innocent Eyes
- B-side: "Happy Xmas (War Is Over)"; "Here I Am" (piano/cello version)
- Released: 1 December 2003
- Studio: Mansfield Lodge, Conway (Los Angeles); Metropolis Audio (Melbourne, Australia)
- Length: 3:39
- Label: Epic
- Songwriters: Delta Goodrem; Kara DioGuardi; Jarrad Rogers
- Producer: John Fields

Delta Goodrem singles chronology
"Not Me, Not I" (2003)	"Predictable" (2003)	"Out of the Blue" (2004)

"Predictable" is a song written by Delta Goodrem, Kara DioGuardi, and Jarrad Rogers for Goodrem's debut studio album, Innocent Eyes (2003). Released on 1 December 2003, the single peaked at number-one on the Australian ARIA Singles Chart, becoming Goodrem's fifth consecutive number-one single in Australia. This achievement broke the record set by Goodrem for the most consecutive number-ones from a debut album; the original record was held by Kylie Minogue. Due to Goodrem's cancer treatment, she was unable to shoot an accompanying film clip; Sony used a live video to represent the song. The live video was shot at the headquarters for Channel V in July 2003.

== Background and meaning ==
The song was produced by John Fields in Los Angeles. Originally, the demo version of the song was rather different from the end product; however, Delta Goodrem desired the song to have a rock edge to it, thus asking Fields to help produce it. The song is set around the theme of a girl rejecting the advances of a man, because she can see through his façade, and knows that if she lets him enter her life, she will end up heartbroken.

== Release and reception ==
Epic Records chose "Predictable" as the last single to represent Innocent Eyes and released it as a CD single on 1 December 2003. The single was released with three different, collectable picture discs and debuted at number two on the Australian ARIA Singles Chart, behind the first-series Australian Idol winner, Guy Sebastian. Due to her illness and treatment, the single received little promotion, but two weeks after its release, the song reached number one. The single remained in the top 10 for eight weeks and became the 17th-highest-selling single of Australia for 2003.

== Track listing ==
Australian CD single
No.	Title	Writer(s)	Length
1.	"Predictable"	Delta Goodrem, Kara DioGuardi, Jarrad Rogers	3:39
2.	"Happy Xmas (War Is Over)"	John Lennon, Yoko Ono	4:36
3.	"Here I Am" (piano/cello version)	Goodrem, Vince Pizzinga	4:23

== Credits and personnel ==
Credits are lifted from the Innocent Eyes album booklet.

Studios

- Produced, recorded, and arranged at Mansfield Lodge, Conway (Los Angeles), and Metropolis Audio (Melbourne, Australia)
- Mastered at Sterling Sound (New York City)

Personnel

- Delta Goodrem – writing, piano
- Kara DioGuardi – writing
- Jarrad Rogers – writing
- John Fields – vocals, guitars, bass, keyboards, production, recording, arrangement
- Phil Solem – guitars
- David Falzone – piano
- Matt Mahaffey – keyboards, noises
- Dorian Crozier – drums
- Billy Hawn – percussion
- Ameena Khawaja – cello
- Sam Storey – studio assistant (Conway)
- Robbie Adams – studio assistant (Metropolis)
- Carl Schubert – studio assistant (Metropolis)
- Michael H. Brauer – mixing
- Greg Calbi – mastering

== Charts ==
=== Weekly charts ===
Chart (2003)	Peak position
Australia (ARIA)	1

=== Year-end charts ===
Chart (2003)	Position
Australia (ARIA)	17

Chart (2004)	Position
Australia (ARIA)	30

=== Decade-end charts ===
Chart (2000–2009)	Position
Australia (ARIA)	43

== Certifications and sales ==
Region	Certification	Certified units/sales
Australia (ARIA)	2× Platinum	140,000^{^}
^{^} Shipments figures based on certification alone.
