= Not Me, Not I =

2003 single by Delta Goodrem

Single by Delta Goodrem

from the album Innocent Eyes
- B-side: "Right There Waiting"
- Released: 15 September 2003
- Length: 4:26
- Label: Epic
- Songwriters: Delta Goodrem; Kara DioGuardi; Gary Barlow; Eliot Kennedy; Jarrad Rogers
- Producers: Gary Barlow; Eliot Kennedy

Delta Goodrem singles chronology
"Innocent Eyes" (2003)	"Not Me, Not I" (2003)	"Predictable" (2003)

Music video
- "Not Me, Not I" on YouTube

Alternative cover
- Cover two of "Not Me, Not I"

"Not Me, Not I" is a song written by Delta Goodrem, Kara DioGuardi, Gary Barlow, Eliot Kennedy, and Jarrad Rogers, produced by Barlow and Kennedy for Goodrem's first studio album, Innocent Eyes (2003). It was released as the album's fourth single in Australia on 15 September 2003. The song peaked at number one on the Australian Singles Chart, giving Goodrem her fourth number-one single and breaking Kylie Minogue's record of having the most songs released from an album to reach number one.

== Background and composition ==
This single is a love song, which talks about her pain at losing her first love. There has been speculation she is singing about her ex-boyfriend and fellow Neighbours star Blair McDonough.

The song is acoustic rock, with pop rock influences. It is heavily piano-driven with some use of a string ensemble. The song has a prominent emphasis on the instrumental arranging, and is written in the key or E minor. The chords follow in this order: Em–C–D–B7, and then for the chorus: Em–C–Am7–D. At a live performance in Sydney in September 2023, Goodrem revealed the song was initially produced as an uptempo, RnB infused song before being stripped back for the final album version.

== Chart performance ==
In Australia, "Not Me, Not I" debuted at number two on the ARIA Singles Chart, behind Dido's "White Flag". The week after, it took the number one position, giving Delta Goodrem her fourth consecutive number-one single in Australia. This broke Kylie Minogue's previous record of three consecutive number ones. "Not Me, Not I" remained in the top 10 for 10 weeks. In the United Kingdom, the single debuted and peaked at number 18, while in New Zealand, it peaked at number 11.

== Music video ==
This video was shot during the early stages of Goodrem's cancer at Newtown, Sydney, Australia. The video clip for the song was filmed in August 2003 and was directed by Michael Spiccia, who has worked with other artists including Disco Montego and Killing Heidi. Goodrem posed in a range of outfits during the shoot at a secret location in Redfern Railroads. The clip includes a trademark shot of Goodrem playing the piano, along with other visual effects including the ethereal goddess scene.

== Track listings ==
Australian CD1
No.	Title	Writer(s)	Length
1.	"Not Me, Not I"	Delta Goodrem, Kara DioGuardi, Gary Barlow, Eliot Kennedy, Jarrad Rogers
2.	"Right There Waiting" (demo at age 14)	Goodrem, Vince Pizzinga
3.	"Not Me, Not I" (instrumental)	Goodrem, DioGuardi, Barlow, Kennedy, Rogers

Australian CD2
No.	Title	Writer(s)	Length
1.	"Not Me, Not I"	Goodrem, DioGuardi, Barlow, Kennedy, Rogers
2.	"Not Me, Not I" (recorded live at [V]HQ)	Goodrem, DioGuardi, Barlow, Kennedy, Rogers
3.	"Innocent Eyes" (The Luge mix)	Goodrem, Pizzinga

UK CD1
No.	Title	Writer(s)	Length
1.	"Not Me, Not I" (album version)	Goodrem, DioGuardi, Barlow, Kennedy, Rogers	4:25
2.	"Right There Waiting"	Goodrem, Pizzinga	3:37

UK CD2
No.	Title	Writer(s)	Length
1.	"Not Me, Not I" (album version)	Goodrem, DioGuardi, Barlow, Kennedy, Rogers	4:25
2.	"Have Yourself a Merry Little Christmas"	Hugh Martin, Ralph Blane	4:20
3.	"Happy Xmas (War Is Over)"	John Lennon, Yoko Ono	4:33
4.	"Not Me, Not I" (recorded live at [V]HQ)	Goodrem, DioGuardi, Barlow, Kennedy, Rogers	3:48
5.	"Not Me, Not I" (video)	Goodrem, DioGuardi, Barlow, Kennedy, Rogers	4:20
6.	"Delta at the ARIAs" (video)		2:00
7.	"Not Me, Not I" (live at Channel [V]HQ—video version)	Goodrem, DioGuardi, Barlow, Kennedy, Rogers	3:42

== Credits and personnel ==
Credits are lifted from the Innocent Eyes album booklet.

Studios

- Produced at True North Studios (Cheshire, England) and Metropolis Audio (Melbourne, Australia)
- Mastered at Sterling Sound (New York City)

Personnel

- Delta Goodrem – writing
- Kara DioGuardi – writing
- Gary Barlow – writing, keyboards, programming, production
- Eliot Kennedy – writing, guitars, production
- Jarrad Rogers – writing
- Ami Richardson – backing vocals
- Spectrasonics "BackBeat" – drum samples
- Chris Cameron – string arrangement
- Michael H. Brauer – mixing
- Robbie Adams – engineering
- Carl Schubert – assistant engineering
- Greg Calbi – mastering

== Charts ==
=== Weekly charts ===
Chart (2003)	Peak position
Australia (ARIA)	1
CIS Airplay (TopHit)	82
Ireland (IRMA)	25
Netherlands (Single Top 100)	49
New Zealand (Recorded Music NZ)	11
Scotland Singles (OCC)	14
UK Singles (OCC)	18

=== Year-end charts ===
Chart (2003)	Position
Australia (ARIA)	20

== Certifications ==
Region	Certification	Certified units/sales
Australia (ARIA)	Platinum	70,000^{^}
^{^} Shipments figures based on certification alone.

== Release history ==
Region	Date	Format(s)	Label(s)	Ref.
Australia	15 September 2003	CD	Epic	
United Kingdom	1 December 2003	CD	Epic	
