= Brian McFadden discography =

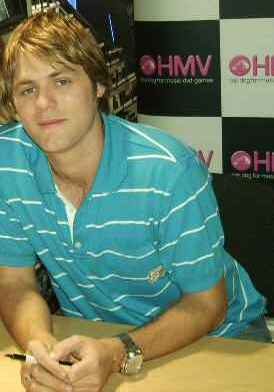
- Studio albums: 5
- Singles: 17
- Music videos: 12
- DVDs: 1

Irish singer-songwriter Brian McFadden has released five studio albums and seventeen singles. He is signed to BMF Records, Universal Music Australia and Island Records Australia.

Two of his studio albums have charted within the top 10 including his debut album, Irish Son (2004), which peaked within the top 6 on the Irish and Danish albums charts and also his second, Set in Stone (2008), which peaked at No. 5 on the ARIA Australian Albums Chart. Five of his singles have also reached the top 10, including four No. 1s and has also had two other top 15 singles. His debut single "Real to Me" from the album, Irish Son became his first No. 1 single as a solo artist in four European countries. The album also produced the song "Almost Here", a duet with his fiancé Delta Goodrem, which became his second No. 1 and gained a platinum accreditation in Australia. In 2007, McFadden released "Like Only a Woman Can", which became his third consecutive Ireland number-one single. His third studio album, Wall of Soundz, was released in April 2010 and produced his fourth No. 1 single, "Just Say So", which features American rapper Kevin Rudolf and became a platinum seller in Australia.

== Studio albums ==
Title	Details	Peak chart positions									Certifications
Title	Details	IRE	AUS	AUT	DEN	FIN	NLD	SWE	SWI	UK	Certifications
Irish Son	Released: 24 November 2004; Label: Sony Music; Format: CD, digital download	6	54	57	5	33	60	31	38	24	BPI: Gold; IFPI DEN: Gold
Set in Stone	Released: 19 April 2008; Label: BMF; Format: CD, digital download	—	5	—	—	—	—	—	—	—	
Wall of Soundz	Released: 23 April 2010; Label: BMF, Island; Format: CD, digital download	—	27	—	—	—	—	—	—	—	
The Irish Connection	Released: 4 March 2013; Label: BMF, Island; Format: CD, digital download	75	66	—	—	—	—	—	—	51	
Otis	Released: 22 February 2019; Label: BoHo; Format: CD, digital download	—	—	—	—	—	—	—	—	—	
"—" denotes release did not chart or was not released in that country

== Singles ==
=== As lead artist ===
Title	Year	Peak chart positions									Certifications (sales thresholds)	Album
Title	Year	IRE	AUS	AUT	DEN	NOR	NZ	SWE	SWI	UK	Certifications (sales thresholds)	Album
"Real to Me"	2004	1	54	26	1	1	16	2	28	1		Irish Son
"Irish Son"	2004	2	—	—	—	—	33	—	—	6		Irish Son
"Almost Here" (with Delta Goodrem)	2005	1	1	34	2	3	—	29	36	3	ARIA: Platinum	Irish Son
"Demons"	2005	24	—	—	—	—	—	—	—	28		Irish Son
"Like Only a Woman Can"	2007	1	13	—	—	—	39	—	—	—	ARIA: Gold	Set in Stone
"Twisted"	2008	—	29	—	—	—	—	—	—	—		Set in Stone
"Everything but You"	2008	—	99	—	—	—	—	—	—	—		Set in Stone
"Just Say So" (featuring Kevin Rudolf)	2010	—	1	—	—	—	—	—	—	—	ARIA: Platinum	Wall of Soundz
"Chemical Rush"	2010	—	12	—	—	—	—	—	—	—		Wall of Soundz
"Mistakes" (with Delta Goodrem)	2010	—	41	—	—	—	—	—	—	—		Wall of Soundz
"Just the Way You Are (Drunk at the Bar)"	2011	—	49	—	—	—	—	—	—	—		Non-album singles
"Come Party" / "That's How Life Goes"	2011	—	—	—	—	—	—	—	—	—		Non-album singles
"Wrap My Arms"	2012	—	70	—	—	—	—	—	—	—		Non-album singles
"Invisible"	2012	33	—	—	—	—	—	—	—	—		Non-album singles
"All I Want Is You" (featuring Ronan Keating)	2013	—	—	—	—	—	—	—	—	—		The Irish Connection
"Time to Save Our Love"	2013	—	—	—	—	—	—	—	—	—		Non-album singles
"Call on Me Brother"	2015	—	—	—	—	—	—	—	—	—		Non-album singles
"Otis Singles: Direct Me / Angel" (featuring Mica Paris)	2018	—	—	—	—	—	—	—	—	—		Otis
"Cigarettes and Coffee"	2019	—	—	—	—	—	—	—	—	—		Otis
"—" denotes release did not chart or was not released in that country

=== As featured artist ===
Title	Year	Peak chart positions		Album
Title	Year	IRE	UK	Album
"Everybody's Someone" (LeAnn Rimes featuring Brian McFadden)	2006	27	48	Whatever We Wanna

== Other appearances ==
Title	Year	Album
"To Love Somebody" (Ronan Keating featuring Brian McFadden)	2010	Duet

== Writing credits ==
Year	Song	Co-writer(s)	Artist	Album
2005	"Hollow No More"	Delta Goodrem, Steve Mackay	Delta Goodrem	B-Side
2006	"Together We Are One"	Delta Goodrem, Guy Chambers	Delta Goodrem	2006 Commonthwealth Games
2007	"Believe Again"	Delta Goodrem, Stuart Crichton, Tommy Lee James, Marius De Vries	Delta Goodrem	Delta (Delta Goodrem album)
2007	"In This Life (Delta Goodrem song)"	Delta Goodrem, Stuart Crichton, Tommy Lee James, John Shanks	Delta Goodrem	Delta
2007	"You Will Only Break My Heart"	Delta Goodrem, Stuart Crichton, Tommy Lee James, Marius De Vries	Delta Goodrem	Delta
2007	"One Day"	Delta Goodrem, Stuart Crichton, Tommy Lee James	Delta Goodrem	Delta
2007	"Angels In The Room"	Delta Goodrem, Stuart Crichton, Tommy Lee James	Delta Goodrem	Delta
