= Believe Again Tour =

2009 concert tour by Delta Goodrem

- Tour by Delta Goodrem
- Associated album: Delta
- Start date: 9 January 2009
- End date: 4 February 2009
- Legs: 1
- No. of shows: 14

Delta Goodrem concert chronology
- The Visualise Tour (2005); Believe Again Tour (2009); An Evening with Delta: The Top of My World Shows (2012)

The Believe Again Tour is the second concert tour by Australian singer-songwriter Delta Goodrem, in support of her third studio album, Delta (2007). The tour saw Goodrem perform 14 shows across Australia, commencing in Newcastle on 9 January 2009 and concluding in Sydney on 4 February 2009. Goodrem's fiancé at the time, Irish singer Brian McFadden, was the support act.

The tour was released on DVD and as a live album in September 2009, titled Believe Again: Australian Tour 2009.

== Set list ==
1. "Believe Again"
2. "Innocent Eyes"
3. "In This Life"
4. "I Can't Break It to My Heart"
5. "Not Me, Not I"
6. "Out of the Blue"
7. "Brave Face" (with excerpts of "Billie Jean")
8. "Mistaken Identity"
9. "You Will Only Break My Heart"
10. "Born to Try"
11. "Butterfly"
12. "That's Freedom"
13. "Running Away"
14. "Queen of the Night"
15. "Sweet Dreams (Are Made of This)"
16. "Predictable"
17. "Do You Love Me" (with Brian McFadden)
18. "Almost Here" (with Brian McFadden)
19. "Together We Are One" / "One Day"
20. "Lost Without You"
21. "Believe Again" (reprise)

== Tour dates ==
List of concerts
Date	City	Country	Venue
9 January 2009	Newcastle	Australia	Newcastle Civic Theatre
10 January 2009	Newcastle	Australia	Newcastle Civic Theatre
11 January 2009	Sydney	Australia	State Theatre
13 January 2009	Adelaide	Australia	Adelaide Entertainment Centre
14 January 2009	Adelaide	Australia	Adelaide Entertainment Centre
16 January 2009	Melbourne	Australia	Hamer Hall
17 January 2009	Melbourne	Australia	Hamer Hall
19 January 2009	Melbourne	Australia	Hamer Hall
22 January 2009	Wollongong	Australia	WIN Entertainment Centre
23 January 2009	Canberra	Australia	Royal Theatre
26 January 2009	Brisbane	Australia	Brisbane Convention & Exhibition Centre
31 January 2009	Perth	Australia	Kings Park
3 February 2009	Sydney	Australia	State Theatre
4 February 2009	Sydney	Australia	State Theatre

== Believe Again: Australian Tour 2009 ==
Believe Again: Australian Tour 2009

Video by Delta Goodrem
- Released: 18 September 2009 (Australia)
- Genre: Pop
- Length: 185 mins
- Label: Sony Music Entertainment (#0886975745296)

Delta Goodrem chronology
The Visualise Tour: Live in Concert (2005)	Believe Again: Australian Tour 2009 (2009)

Goodrem's Sydney shows at the State Theatre were recorded for the DVD and live album, titled Believe Again: Australian Tour 2009. Released on 18 September 2009 through Sony Music, the DVD cover was selected through a competition on Goodrem's official website, with the winning design by Australian graphic designer, Jacky Ho. The release became Goodrem's third consecutive number 1 on the ARIA Music DVD Chart.

=== Track listing ===
CD track listing:

No.	Title	Writer(s)	Length
1.	"Intro"		0:51
2.	"Believe Again"	Delta Goodrem, Stuart Crichton, Tommy Lee James, Brian McFadden	4:41
3.	"Innocent Eyes"	Goodrem, Vince Pizzinga	5:29
4.	"In This Life"	Goodrem, Crichton, Lee James, McFadden	4:28
5.	"I Can't Break It to My Heart"	Goodrem, Savan Kotecha, Kristian Lundin	4:00
6.	"Not Me, Not I"	Goodrem, Kara DioGuardi, Gary Barlow, Eliot Kennedy, Jarrad Rogers	4:37
7.	"Out of the Blue"	Goodrem, Guy Chambers	5:02
8.	"Mistaken Identity"	Goodrem, Billymann	4:32
9.	"You Will Only Break My Heart"	Goodrem, Crichton, Lee James, McFadden	5:19
10.	"Born to Try"	Goodrem, Audius Mtawarira	4:25
11.	"Butterfly"	Garry Barlow, Eliot Kennedy, Tim Woodcock	4:02
12.	"That's Freedom"	Tom Kimmel, Jean Anne Chapman	3:51
13.	"Running Away"	Goodrem, Barlow, Kennedy, Woodcock	3:06
14.	"Queen of the Night"	Whitney Houston, L. A. Reid, Babyface, Daryl Simmons	2:45
15.	"Sweet Dreams (Are Made of This)"	Annie Lennox, Dave Stewart	2:08
16.	"Predictable"	Goodrem, DioGuardi, Rogers	3:12
17.	"Almost Here" (with Brian McFadden)	McFadden, Paul Barry, Mark Taylor	3:50
18.	"Together We Are One / One Day"	Goodrem, McFadden, Chambers, Crichton, Lee James	5:15
19.	"Lost Without You"	Bridget Benenate, Matthew Gerrard	3:52
20.	"Believe Again" (reprise)	Goodrem, McFadden, Crichton, Lee James	1:13

DVD features:

- Full concert
- Making of the tour
- Behind the scenes
- Stage visuals:
1. "Queen of the Night"
2. "Sweet Dreams (Are Made of This)"
- Special guest segment with Brian McFadden

=== Charts ===
==== Weekly charts ====
Chart (2003)	Peak positions
Australian ARIA DVD Chart	1

==== Certifications ====
Region	Certification	Certified units/sales
Australia (ARIA)	Gold	7,500^{^}
^{^} Shipments figures based on certification alone.

== Personnel ==
Adapted from the tour programme credits.

Crew:

- Creative director – Delta Goodrem
- Promoter – Danity Consolidated Entertainment
- Tour manager – Chris Upjohn
- Production manager – Rob Miles
- FOH engineer – James Kilpatrick
- Monitor engineer – Ben Shapiro
- Lighting designer – Alex Saad
- Guitar/stage tech – Gregory Crompton
- Styling assistant – Debbie Van Eack
- Light system crew – Bob Oswald, Troy Brown
- FOH audio technician – Pat Richardson
- Monitor technician – Tim Seconi
- Choreography – Shannon Holtzapffel, Project Moda

Band:

- Vocals, piano, acoustic guitar – Delta Goodrem
- Musical director, keyboards, acoustic guitar, programming – Rich Sanford
- Electric and acoustic guitars – Michael Dolce
- Bass guitar, synth bass – Byron Luiters
- Drums, percussion – Terepai Richmond
- Backing vocals – Sharon Muscat, Christine Muscat, Glenn Cunningham
