= Everything but You =

Everything but You may refer to:

- "Everything but You" (Clean Bandit song), 2022
- "Everything but You" (Brian McFadden song), 2008
- "Everything but You", song by Megan McKenna from Story of Me, 2018
- "Everything but You", song by Don George, 1945
