= List of number-one singles of 2005 (Ireland) =

This is a list of the Irish Recorded Music Association's Irish Singles Chart Top 50 number-ones of 2005.

Issue date	Song	Artist	ref
6 January	"Numb/Encore"	Linkin Park and Jay-Z	
13 January	"Numb/Encore"	Linkin Park and Jay-Z	
20 January	"Numb/Encore"	Linkin Park and Jay-Z	
27 January	"Numb/Encore"	Linkin Park and Jay-Z	
3 February	"Poison/I Believe"	Zoo	
10 February	"Almost Here"	Brian McFadden and Delta Goodrem	
17 February	"Get Right"	Jennifer Lopez	
24 February	"Over and Over"	Nelly featuring Tim McGraw	
3 March	"Over and Over"	Nelly featuring Tim McGraw	
10 March	"Over and Over"	Nelly featuring Tim McGraw	
17 March	"All About You / You've Got a Friend"	McFly	
24 March	"All About You / You've Got a Friend"	McFly	
31 March	"(Is This the Way to) Amarillo"	Tony Christie featuring Peter Kay	
7 April	"(Is This the Way to) Amarillo"	Tony Christie featuring Peter Kay	
14 April	"(Is This the Way to) Amarillo"	Tony Christie featuring Peter Kay	
21 April	"(Is This the Way to) Amarillo"	Tony Christie featuring Peter Kay	
28 April	"(Is This the Way to) Amarillo"	Tony Christie featuring Peter Kay	
5 May	"Lonely"	Akon	
12 May	"Lonely"	Akon	
19 May	"Lonely"	Akon	
26 May	"Lonely"	Akon	
2 June	"Axel F"	Crazy Frog	
9 June	"Axel F"	Crazy Frog	
16 June	"Axel F"	Crazy Frog	
23 June	"Axel F"	Crazy Frog	
30 June	"Ghetto Gospel"	2Pac	
7 July	"Ghetto Gospel"	2Pac	
14 July	"Ghetto Gospel"	2Pac	
21 July	"You're Beautiful"	James Blunt	
28 July	"You're Beautiful"	James Blunt	
4 August	"You're Beautiful"	James Blunt	
11 August	"You're Beautiful"	James Blunt	
18 August	"Bad Day"	Daniel Powter	
25 August	"Bad Day"	Daniel Powter	
1 September	"Bad Day"	Daniel Powter	
8 September	"Don't Cha"	Pussycat Dolls	
15 September	"Don't Cha"	Pussycat Dolls	
22 September	"Don't Cha"	Pussycat Dolls	
29 September	"Don't Cha"	Pussycat Dolls	
6 October	"Push the Button"	Sugababes	
13 October	"Push the Button"	Sugababes	
20 October	"Push the Button"	Sugababes	
27 October	"You Raise Me Up"	Westlife	
3 November	"You Raise Me Up"	Westlife	
10 November	"You Raise Me Up"	Westlife	
17 November	"You Raise Me Up"	Westlife	
24 November	"You Raise Me Up"	Westlife	
1 December	"You Raise Me Up"	Westlife	
8 December	"My Humps"	The Black Eyed Peas	
15 December	"JCB Song"	Nizlopi	
22 December	"Leave Right Now"	Mario Rosenstock	
29 December	"JCB Song"	Nizlopi	

== See also ==
- 2005 in music
