= The Irish Connection (Brian McFadden album) =

Studio album by Brian McFadden
- Released: 4 March 2013
- Recorded: 2012–2013
- Studio: Dublin and Sydney
- Genre: Pop; rock; soul
- Length: 34:49
- Label: BMF; Island; EMI
- Producer: Brian McFadden; Robert Conley

Brian McFadden chronology
Wall of Soundz (2010)	The Irish Connection (2013)	Otis (2019)

Singles from The Irish Connection
- 1. "All I Want Is You" Released: 25 February 2013

The Irish Connection is the fourth studio album released by Irish singer-songwriter, Brian McFadden. The album was released on 1 March 2013 in Ireland, followed three days later on 4 March in the United Kingdom. The album was preceded by the release of the lead single, a cover of "All I Want Is You", a duet with Ronan Keating, released on 25 February 2013. The album contains ten covers of songs by popular Irish artists, including U2, Sinéad O'Connor and Damien Rice.

== Background ==
The Irish Connection is McFadden's first album to be released in the United Kingdom in over eight years, with both his second and third studio albums, Set in Stone and Wall of Soundz, being Australian-exclusive releases. The album contains ten covers of songs by popular Irish artists, described as McFadden as a platform for "showcasing the strength and versatility of his voice, through some of the very best Irish songwriting". In an interview on his official website, McFadden confirmed that he personally chose each track on the album, covering artists such as Snow Patrol, The Cranberries, Damien Rice, Enya and Van Morrison.

The album also features collaborations with fellow Irish artists, including Ronan Keating on the album's lead single, "All I Want Is You", Sinéad O'Connor on "Black Is the Colour", and Christy Dignam on "Crazy World". In promotion of the album, McFadden was confirmed as the support act for Keating's 'Fires' tour during January and February 2013, including the main focus date at the O2 Arena in London. The album was executively produced by both McFadden and Robert Conley, who executively produced his last album, Wall of Soundz. The album was mixed by Philip Magee and recorded in Dublin, Ireland and Sydney, Australia.

McFadden said of the album in an interview with his official website: "This album is something I have wanted to do for a long time. Ireland has produced some of the greatest songs in history and I decided I would put my own twist on a collection of my favourite ever Irish songs by returning to my heritage, and showcasing my voice at its very best."

== Singles ==
- "All I Want Is You", a duet with Ronan Keating, was released as the album's lead single on 25 February 2013. The music video contains footage of McFadden performing the song live on tour. The video does not feature Keating.

== Track listing ==
No.	Title	Writer(s)	Length
1.	"Black Is the Colour" (featuring Sinéad O'Connor)	Traditional	3:33
2.	"All I Want Is You" (featuring Ronan Keating)	Paul Hewson, Adam Clayton, Larry Mullen, David Evans	3:53
3.	"Nine Crimes"	Damien Rice	2:51
4.	"Dreams"	Dolores O'Riordan, Noel Hogan	3:44
5.	"Crazy World" (featuring Christy Dignam)	Christy Dignam, Joe Jewell, Billy McGuiness, Tony McGuinness, Alan Downey	4:40
6.	"No Frontiers"	Jimmy MacCarthy	4:28
7.	"Only Time"	Enya, Roma Ryan	2:54
8.	"Chocolate"	Gary Lightbody, Mark McClelland, Jonny Quinn, Nathan Connolly	3:11
9.	"Moondance"	Van Morrison	3:35
10.	"Nothing Compares to You"	Prince Rogers Nelson	4:19

== Charts ==
Chart (2013)	Peak position
Australian Albums (ARIA)	66
Irish Albums (IRMA)	75
Scottish Albums (OCC)	34
UK Albums (OCC)	51
