= Delta (Delta Goodrem album) =

Studio album by Delta Goodrem
- Released: 20 October 2007
- Recorded: June 2006 – September 2007; London; Los Angeles
- Studios: Aviation Studios (Dublin, Ireland); SCS Studios (Hastings, UK); Strongroom, Olympic Studios, Sphere Studios, The Phono Room, Rokstone Studios and Metropolis Studios (London, UK); Henson Recording Studios (Hollywood, California, USA); The Sweat Box (Topanga, California, USA); Atlantis Studios (Los Angeles, California, USA)
- Genres: Pop rock; dance-pop
- Length: 47:56
- Labels: Sony BMG; Mercury
- Producers: Stuart Crichton; Andrew Frampton; Steve Kipner; John Shanks; Marius de Vries

Delta Goodrem chronology
Innocent Eyes (2006)	Delta (2007)	Child of the Universe (2012)

Singles from Delta
- 1. "In This Life" Released: 15 September 2007; 2. "Believe Again" Released: 10 December 2007.; 3. "You Will Only Break My Heart" Released: 29 March 2008; 4. "I Can't Break It to My Heart" Released: 16 August 2008

Delta is the third studio album by Australian singer Delta Goodrem. It was released in Australia on 20 October 2007 through Sony BMG. Goodrem began work on the album in 2006 and collaborated with several writers including Vince Pizzinga, Tommy Lee James, Jörgen Elofsson, Richard Marx, Stuart Crichton, and major contributions by Brian McFadden. The album debuted at No. 1 in Australia, making it her third consecutive chart-topping album there. The album was also released in the United States, by Mercury Records, making it Goodrem's first album to be released there.

== Background and development ==
After the release of her second album Mistaken Identity in 2004, Delta reflected that the album was rushed, written and recorded while she was still recovering from chemotherapy for Hodgkin's lymphoma. Goodrem remarked that she felt overexposed and claimed, "I'd burnt myself out. By the end of 'Mistaken Identity' I thought, 'This is nothing of what I am. I know I can do all of this a lot better'." After a period of being angry, Delta felt she was healed and embraced herself and being in the public eye. Therefore, she started developing a new album, stating, "For a while I was writing songs for this album I didn't want to talk about things, so I didn't want to write about them either. "I had to get over a couple of things. My parents divorced, there was a lot going on. But now I truly am inspired again. I feel regenerated. I feel I've got my energy back."

Initially, the album's original working title was "Condition of a Heart", however she claimed she didn't want a complicated album, claiming, "I want people to take this album home and wrap it around their own lives the way they did with 'Innocent Eyes'." She also claimed that the new album was going to be lighter than her previous work. The newspaper Sydney Morning Herald revealed that the album was going to be "a more upbeat, inspirational tone in her pop music." In contrast to her previous album, which was darker because Goodrem had written about her cancer battle, Delta reflects changes in her personal life; her parents had divorced, she let her mother Lea stand down as her manager as well as discussed her relationship with pop-singer Brian McFadden, whom Delta co-wrote the majority of the songs on the album.

== Composition and songs ==
"A lot of the words from the songs can be quite deep, but that doesn't necessarily mean they are always about my life. There are songs on this album which have nothing to do with my own personal experience of events, but which are still honest and emotional, and which tell a great story.

To give a more mainstream appeal, Goodrem enlisted American songwriters and producers to work on the album, such as Tommy Lee James, John Shanks, Steve Kipner and Savan Kotecha, as well as British musicians Wayne Wilkins, Steve Mac and Wayne Hector, and Swedish record producers Carl Falk and Kristian Lundin. Delta "is an album much more reminiscent of her first album than her second," as stated by Matthew Chesling of Allmusic, who described the album's songs as "well-oiled and ready for mainstream radio." Samantha Amjadali of The Herald Sun pointed out that Delta offers "a refreshing combination of topics and musical styles, and flits between power ballad, boppy pop and slow, sweet and sentimental." Candice Keller of News.com.au noted that the album "welcomes the pop star to womanhood – a new beginning as a lady in love and wise from her time in the industry."

The album opens with the redemptive midtempo ballad "Believe Again", which is an ode to overcoming life's obstacles. The power pop "In This Life" has a more guitar-driven vibe, which according to Cameron Adams of Herald Sun, "updates Goodrem's sound with the help of hit US producer John Shanks." The third track "Possessionless" focuses on her true-life, successful battle with Hodgkin's Lymphoma, which she was diagnosed with in 2003, while fourth track "God Laughs" is about her parents' divorce and the need to soldier on no matter what. The reggae finger-snapper "You Will Only Break My Heart" also has electronica and dance influences. According to Candice Keller of News.com.au, the song "prove[s] Goodrem can still embrace a sense of fun in her music, and can take a break from the seriousness of the tear-jerkers." Keller also noted that "The Guardian" showcases that "Goodrem's signature power is evident," while hip-hop nuances are shown on "Barehands" and "Brave Face" (an ode to keeping up appearances in public).

The album also features the power ballads "Woman", a midtempo anthem which was later recorded by American recording artist Toni Braxton for her seventh studio album Pulse (2010), and "I Can't Break It to My Heart", which was also named a piano ballad. Eleventh track "One Day" was considered "ethereal dreamer", while the final track "Angels in the Room" was considered an "adult contemporary love song," referring to the adult contemporary radio format. The U.S. version of the album excludes the track "The Guardian", while adding a new version of her debut single, "Born to Try". Goodrem also wrote the song "Eyes on Me", a Middle Eastern-influenced song which was intended for the album but didn't make the final cut. The song was then recorded by Celine Dion for her album Taking Chances (2007).

== Critical reception ==
Professional ratings
Review scores
Source	Rating
Allmusic	3.5/5 stars
Billboard	(positive)
Boston Herald	(positive)
CD Starts	(7/10)
Herald Sun	3.5/5 stars
Mass Online	3.0/5 stars
News.com.au	(positive)
NewsOK	(favorable)
Scripps News	3.5/5 stars
The Korea Times	(positive)

Delta received generally favorable reviews from music critics. Samantha Amjadali of The Herald Sun compared Delta to Céline Dion, writing that "her voice is powerful and flexible enough to achieve something close to Dion's signature five-octave vocal acrobatics." Amjadali also praised Goodrem's talented as lyricist and skilled musician, writing that "it shines through in this, her most accomplished and enjoyable release yet," before calling the album "light and happy, sweet and summery. Just lovely." Matthew Chisling of Allmusic gave the album 3.5 out of 5 stars, noting that Delta "came back more mature and classy than ever." Chisling claimed that the album "is a mostly consistent sampling of a new, mature, smoothed out Goodrem, whose new vocal explorations with minor digital enhancements make her welcome by an even broader pop audience." Chuck Taylor of Billboard named it "a vivacious 12-song showcase of versatility and melodic mastery", also noting that "timing is a bull's-eye for Goodrem's deliciously tasteful U.S. bid." Candice Keller of News.com.au wrote that Delta has "the Midas Touch", writing that the album "captures Goodrem as a sophisticated woman."

In his review for The Korea Times, Chung Ah-young remarked that in Delta, the singer "creates cohesive and haunting sounds from beginning to end through unique songs with her stunning songwriting and musical talent." Bill Brotherton of Boston Herald called the album "a refreshingly schmaltz-free, though slickly produced pop album that will appeal to both preteens and grandmas." Chuck Campbell of Scripps News was very positive, writing that the self-titled project "sounds like the work of an old pro. On 'Delta,' Goodrem packs the honest and uplifting qualities of her mentor, Olivia Newton-John, plus the stylized bombast of Celine Dion, the sense of adventure of Madonna, the introspection of Alanis Morissette and the vocal stunts of Mariah Carey. Brandy McDonnell of NewsOK was mixed, writing that Goodrem "boasts a lovely clear voice, but the uneven and slickly produced album, clearly designed to appeal to mainstream radio, doesn't do much to separate her from the Natasha Bedingfields and Colbie Caillats already crooning over the airways," but went on to praise the "'pop jewels' among all the sludge and rocks to make it worth the effort to sift through it."

== Singles ==
- "In This Life" – "In This Life" was first heard on Australian radio on 28 August 2007 and was officially released on 15 September 2007. The single debuted at No. 1 on the Australian Singles Chart, making it Goodrem's eighth number-one single. It also went to Number One in Czechia.
- "Believe Again" – Premiering on Australian radio in late October 2007, the single's video was filmed in Sydney, Australia and received much media coverage. The single, released on 8 December 2007, was accompanied by exclusive remixes and the unreleased track, "Fortune And Love". The single debuted and peaked at No. 2 on the Australian Singles Chart, and was also her second Number One single in Sweden.
- "You Will Only Break My Heart" – Released to radio on 25 February 2008, the single was officially released on 29 March 2008. The single features a remix and instrumental as well as a live recording of the smash-hit Black Velvet, originally recorded and released by Alannah Myles. The video features clips of fan submissions following such a request on Goodrem's official website. The single debuted and peaked at No. 14 on the Australian Singles Chart, but did much better in Sweden, where it became her third Number One single.
- "I Can't Break It to My Heart" – Released to radio on 12 July 2008, the single was released on 16 August 2008 and peaked at No. 13 on the Australian Singles Chart.

== Promotion ==
=== Australia and Asia ===
Goodrem stated that she planned to promote internationally, in areas she has never released before, such as South America. In 2007, she only promoted the album in her home country Australia. Goodrem confirmed that the album would be released in Japan along with some promotion in early 2008.

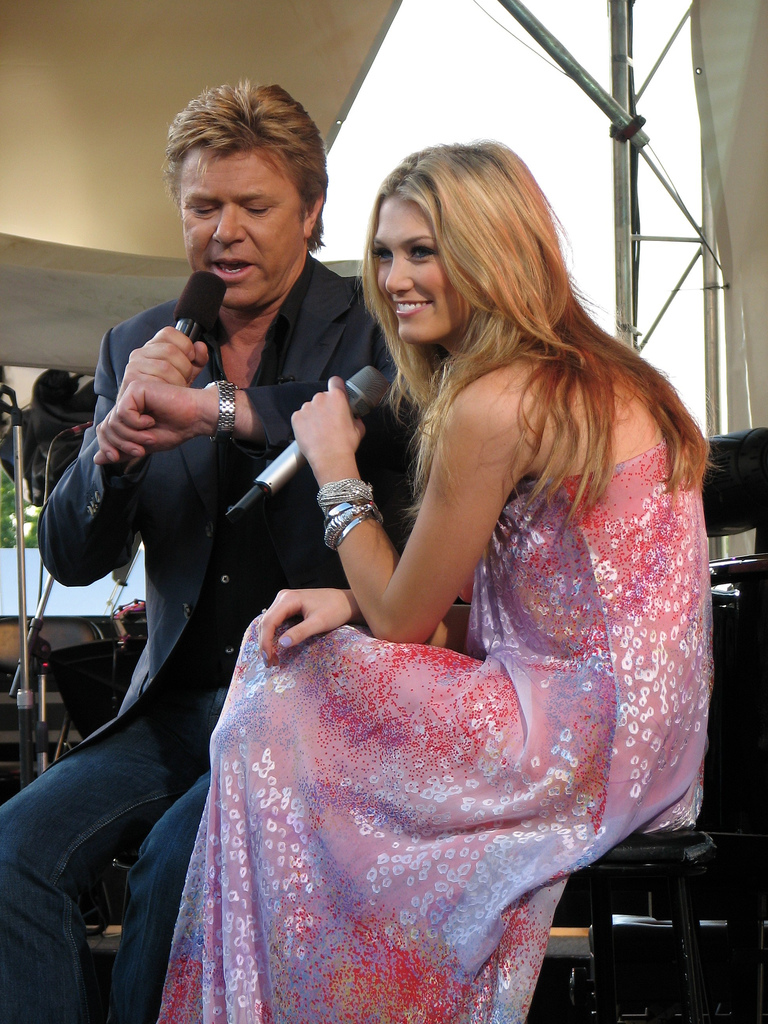
Goodrem performing during promotion in Australia

Goodrem held a Launch Party at the Sydney Opera House on Tuesday 9 October 2007, where 400 invitation-only guests attended. She performed songs from the album, Including "Believe Again", "You Will Only Break My Heart", "Possessionless", "God Laughs" and "Angels in the Room". On 26 October Goodrem performed several songs from the new album on the morning television show Sunrise. Delta performed "In This Life" live on Dancing with the Stars on 9 October 2007. Goodrem also attended the ARIA Awards of 2007 to present an award.

The cover of the album was shot by Chris Colls, who also did a photoshoot with Goodrem for the Australian version of Cosmopolitan in 2007. The album cover has been criticised for its similarity to a magazine cover and "smouldering sexiness".

=== United States ===
In March 2008, Goodrem started to promote the album in the United States. She visited radio stations to promote her single "In This Life" which was released there on 15 April. She has been on the cover of OK! magazine and Vegas Magazine. Goodrem has also had coverage in Billboard magazine and Seventeen magazine. Goodrem was also featured on the May/June cover of Vegas Magazine.

Goodrem did an instore signing session at the Virgin Megastore at Times Square in New York City on 16 July 2008. She also performed "In This Life" on The View on 17 July. Additionally, it was confirmed that she would be on the Late Show with David Letterman in September 2008.

On 17 June 2008, Goodrem's single "In This Life" debuted at number 40 on the Billboard Hot Adult Top 40 Tracks chart. It peaked at number 20.

=== Tours ===
In July 2008, it was announced that Goodrem will embark on a national tour of Australia aptly entitled the Believe Again Tour in smaller venues than she did on her Visualise Tour. Goodrem felt that the songs on her new album lent themselves to a smaller, more intimate setting. She announced 9 dates in 7 different cities, but has since announced more shows due to a high volume of ticket sales. To date she will perform 14 shows in 8 cities. Goodrem was quoted as saying what viewers saw at the AFI Awards, regarding her remixed song and dance performance of Believe Again, in 2007, is only a taste of what is to be expected from her new tour. The tour began on 9 January and ended on 4 February 2009.

=== Release ===
The album was released in Australia on 20 October 2007. The album debuted atop the ARIA chart on 28 October 2007 making this Goodrem's third number one album. The album was certified platinum in its first week of release. The album's release in New Zealand a week later, on 29 October 2007, coincided with a brief promotional trip to New Zealand. The album debuted on the New Zealand charts at number 12. Goodrem stated herself that she would only concentrate on Australia until the beginning of 2008. Goodrem also stated that the album is going to be released in new territories.

Direct Current reported in March 2008 that Goodrem will be releasing the album in the US, 3 June 2008 with a physical and download release eventuating on 15 July due to extra promotional activity in the US.

It was released on 20 February 2008 in Japan. In its first week, it charted at number eight on the International Chart and number 39 on the overall chart, with 4,959 copies sold. In its second week it fell to number 16 on the International chart, with 3,319 sold.

In an article in Billboard magazine dated 12 July, Sony BMG Australia CEO Denis Handlin suggested that once Goodrem had finished promotional duties in the US for Delta, attention would be shifted to the UK and the rest of Europe. Goodrem herself also stated in an interview on UK morning TV show GMTV that she would see her UK fans "soon". However, the album ended up not being released in the UK and Europe other than as an import or download.

== Track listing ==
No.	Title	Writer(s)	Producer(s)	Length
1.	"Believe Again"	Delta Goodrem, Stuart Crichton, Tommy Lee James, Brian McFadden	Stuart Crichton, Marius de Vries	5:48
2.	"In This Life"	Goodrem, Crichton, James, McFadden	John Shanks	3:47
3.	"Possessionless"	Goodrem, Andrew Frampton, Steve Kipner, Wayne Wilkins, McFadden	Steve Kipner, Andrew Frampton, Wayne Wilkins	4:22
4.	"God Laughs"	Goodrem, Frampton, Kipner, Wilkins	Kipner, Frampton, Wilkins	4:09
5.	"You Will Only Break My Heart"	Goodrem, Crichton, James, McFadden	Crichton, Vries	3:03
6.	"The Guardian"	Carl Björsell, Carl Falk, Sharon Vaughn	Crichton	3:48
7.	"Bare Hands"	Goodrem, Frampton, Kipner, Wilkins	Kipner, Frampton, Wilkins	3:44
8.	"Woman"	Steve Mac, Wayne Hector	Steve Mac	4:30
9.	"I Can't Break It to My Heart"	Goodrem, Savan Kotecha, Kristian Lundin	Shanks	4:00
10.	"Brave Face"	Goodrem, Frampton, Kipner, Wilkins	Kipner, Frampton, Wilkins	3:45
11.	"One Day"	Goodrem, Crichton, James, McFadden	Crichton	3:38
12.	"Angels in the Room"	Goodrem, Crichton, James, McFadden	Crichton	4:22
Total length:				47:56

Digital bonus track
No.	Title	Writer(s)	Length
13.	"Right Here in My Heart"	Goodrem, Paul Barry	4:10
Total length:			52:06

Japanese bonus tracks
No.	Title	Writer(s)	Producer(s)	Length
13.	"Breathe In, Breathe Out"	Goodrem, Crichton, James	Crichton	3:34
14.	"Together We Are One"	Goodrem, Guy Chambers, McFadden	Guy Chambers, Richard Flack	4:15
15.	"Live! Together (Tokyo Girls Anthem)" (with Juju) (Deluxe edition only)	Kiyoshi Matsuo, Momoko Suzuki	Matsuo	5:34
Total length:				61:19

Japanese deluxe edition DVD
No.	Title	Length
1.	"In This Life" (Music video)
2.	"In This Life" (Behind the Scenes)
3.	"Believe Again" (Music video)
4.	"Believe Again" (Behind the Scenes)
5.	"Interview with Delta"
6.	"Behind the Scenes with Juju"

North American edition
No.	Title	Writer(s)	Length
1.	"Believe Again" (US mix)	Goodrem, Crichton, James, McFadden	5:48
2.	"In This Life" (Updated mix)	Goodrem, Crichton, James, McFadden	3:47
3.	"Possessionless"	Goodrem, Frampton, Kipner, Wilkins, McFadden	4:22
4.	"Born to Try" (US mix)	Goodrem, Audius Mtawarira	4:03
5.	"Bare Hands"	Goodrem, Frampton, Kipner, Wilkins	3:44
6.	"God Laughs"	Goodrem, Frampton, Kipner, Wilkins	4:09
7.	"You Will Only Break My Heart"	Goodrem, Crichton, James, McFadden	3:03
8.	"Woman"	Mac, Hector	4:30
9.	"Brave Face"	Goodrem, Frampton, Kipner, Wilkins	3:45
10.	"I Can't Break It to My Heart"	Goodrem, Kotecha, Lundin	4:00
11.	"One Day"	Goodrem, Crichton, James, McFadden	3:38
12.	"Angels in the Room"	Goodrem, Crichton, James, McFadden	4:22
13.	"In This Life" (Acoustic) (iTunes bonus track)	Goodrem, Crichton, James, McFadden	3:45

== B-sides ==
The following tracks were not released on the album, but were released on the singles.

Title	Single(s)
"Take Me Home"	"In This Life" – CD single
"Breathe In, Breathe Out"	"In This Life" – Digital download
"Fortune and Love"	"Believe Again" – CD single, digital EP
"Fever"	"Believe Again" – Digital EP
"Unsure"	"Believe Again" – Digital EP
"Black Velvet" (Live)	"You Will Only Break My Heart" – CD single, digital EP
"Burn for You" (Live)	"I Can't Break It to My Heart" – CD single, digital EP
"Edge of Seventeen" (Live medley)	"I Can't Break It to My Heart" – Digital EP

== Personnel ==
Musicians and Vocalists

- Delta Goodrem – vocals, backing vocals (1, 5, 11, 12)
- Jason Boshoff – programming (1, 5)
- Stuart Crichton – keyboards (1, 5, 6, 11, 12), programming (1, 5, 6, 11, 12), backing vocals (1, 5, 11, 12), original string arrangements (1), string arrangements (6), guitars (11)
- Marius de Vries – keyboards (1, 5), programming (1, 5), string arrangements (5)
- Jamie Muhoberac – keyboards (2, 9), acoustic piano (2, 9)
- Dan Chase – programming (2, 9)
- Jeff Rothschild – programming (2, 9)
- Andrew Frampton – keyboards (3, 4, 7, 10), guitars (3, 4, 7, 10), drum programming (3, 4, 7, 10)
- Wayne Wilkins – keyboards (3, 4, 7, 10), drum programming (3, 4, 7, 10)
- David Arch – acoustic piano (8), string arrangements (8)
- Steve Mac – keyboards (8), synthesizers (8)
- Brian McFadden – guitars (1, 5, 11), backing vocals (1, 5, 11)
- David Raniger – guitars (1, 5)
- John Shanks – guitars (2, 9), bass (2, 9)
- John Farrar – guitars (3)
- Steve Kipner – guitars (3, 4, 7, 10)
- Jeremy Shaw – guitars (6, 11)
- Paul Gendler – guitars (8)
- Steve Pearce – bass (8)
- Abe Laboriel Jr. – drums (2, 9)
- Chris Laws – drums (8)
- Chris Elliott – string arrangements (1, 12)
- Isobel Griffiths – orchestra contractor (1, 5)
- Perry Montague-Mason – orchestra leader (1, 5)
- Daniel Debourg – backing vocals (1, 5)
- Tommy Lee James – backing vocals (1, 5)
- Anna Ross – backing vocals (1, 5)
- Maria Martin – backing vocals (8)
- Patricia Scott – backing vocals (8)

Production

- Michael Taylor – A&R
- Stuart Crichton – producer (1, 5, 6, 11, 12), additional vocal production (2)
- Marius de Vries – producer (1, 5)
- John Shanks – producer (2, 9)
- Andrew Frampton – producer (3, 4, 7, 10)
- Steve Kipner – producer (3, 4, 7, 10)
- Wayne Wilkins – producer (3, 4, 7, 10)
- Steve Mac – producer (8), arrangements (8)
- David Collins – A&R administration
- Shari Sutcliffe – production coordinator (2, 9), music contractor (2, 9)
- Killanoodle.com – art direction
- Chris Colls – cover photography
- Matt Jones – booklet photography
- Jo Grogan, Richard Griffiths and Harry Magee for Modest! Management – management
- Z Management – management

Technical

- Ted Jensen – mastering at Sterling Sound (New York, NY, USA)
- John Brough – engineer (1, 5)
- Stuart Crichton – engineer (1, 5, 6, 11, 12), mixing (1, 5, 6, 11, 12)
- Marius de Vries – engineer (1, 5)
- Pete Craigie – mix engineer (1, 5, 6, 11, 12)
- Gary Thomas – string engineer (1, 5)
- Jeff Rothschild – recording (2, 9), mixing (2, 9), additional vocal recording (9)
- Mark Endert – mixing (3, 4, 7, 10)
- Adrian Hall – engineer (6)
- Chris Laws – engineer (8)
- Ren Swan – mix engineer (8)
- Josh Blair – additional engineer (2, 9)
- Lars Fox – Pro Tools editing (2, 9)
- Kristian Lundin – additional vocal recording (9)
- Rohan Onraet – assistant mix engineer (1, 5, 6, 11, 12)
- Mark Foster – assistant string engineer (1)
- Glenn Pittman – assistant engineer (2, 9)
- Daniel Pursey – assistant engineer (8)

== Chart performance ==
Delta debuted at number one on the Australian ARIA Albums Chart on 29 October 2007 with 23,072 copies sold; it was instantly certified platinum denoting shipments of 70,000 copies. In its second week it sold another 12,186 copies and slipped one spot to number two, behind The Eagles' Long Road Out of Eden. In its third week the album moved 8,927 copies and dropped to number three. The album proceeded to fall to numbers four, five, and six over the next three weeks, and in its sixth week it was certified two-times platinum. In its seventh week it remained at number six and the following week it climbed to number five. The week after it remained at number five selling 16,343 copies, and in the subsequent week it climbed to number three with another 19,562 copies boosted by the holiday season, finishing as the thirteenth best-selling album of the year. The album spent thirteen consecutive weeks in the top ten, longer than Mistaken Identity's eight-week run. It re-entered the top 50 three separate times, the last of which was on 24 August 2008 at number 35 following the release of ''I Can't Break It To My Heart'', and was present in the top 50 for a total of 22 non-consecutive weeks and in the top 100 for 50 weeks. The Australian Recording Industry Association has since certified the album triple platinum, denoting sales of 210,000 copies.

In New Zealand, the album debuted at number 12 in the RIANZ Albums Chart after a three-year absence in the charts. The album re-charted in New Zealand on 18 March 2008 at number 17, and charted for a total of nine weeks in the top forty. It has since been certified gold by Recorded Music NZ denoting shipments of 7,500 units in the country. In Japan, the album debuted at number 39 on the Overall chart and number eight on the International chart with almost 4,959 copies in its first week, 1,000 copies more than Mistaken Identity in Japan. It has peaked at number 18 on the US iTunes Store. It later debuted at number 116 on the US Billboard 200 and number one on Billboard's Heatseekers chart with sales of 6,000 copies.

=== Weekly charts ===
Chart (2007–2008)	Peak position
Australia ARIA Albums Chart	1
New Zealand Albums Chart	12
Japanese Albums Chart (Overall)	39
Japanese Albums Chart (International)	8
U.S. Billboard 200	116
U.S. Billboard Top Heatseekers	1

=== End of year charts ===
Year	Chart	Position
2007	Australian ARIA Albums Chart	13
2008	Australian ARIA Albums Chart	72

== Certifications ==
Country	Certification	Sales
Australia	3× platinum	210,000+
Japan	—	30,000
New Zealand	Gold	7,500+
United States	—	21,000

== Release history ==
Country	Date	Label	Format	Catalogue	Notes
Australia	20 October 2007	Sony BMG	CD	88697171932	Standard / Limited Edition
New Zealand	29 October 2007	Sony BMG	CD		Standard
China	25 December 2007	Sony BMG	CD	88697171932	Standard
Hong Kong	11 January 2008	Sony BMG	CD		Standard
Singapore	14 January 2008	Sony BMG	CD		Standard
Taiwan	18 January 2008	Sony BMG	CD	88697171932	Standard
South Korea	28 January 2008	Sony BMG	CD	8803581113938	Standard
Thailand	12 February 2008	Sony BMG	CD	88697171932	Standard
Japan	20 February 2008	Sony Music Japan	CD	SICP-1746	New cover & bonus tracks
Germany	9 May 2008	Sony BMG	CD	B000WM72MA	Standard
Japan	11 June 2008	Sony Music Japan	CD/DVD	SICP-1863	Deluxe Edition with DVD
Canada	15 July 2008	Mercury Records	CD		New cover & alt. tracks
United States	15 July 2008	Mercury Records	CD	001126202	New cover & alt. tracks
United Kingdom	11 November 2009	Sony BMG	Digital download	B002XXJSH8	Standard
Australia	17 November 2023	Sony Music Australia	LP	MOVLP3282	Gold/Black Marbled Vinyl
