= Like Only a Woman Can =

2007 single by Brian McFadden

- Australian artwork

Single by Brian McFadden

from the album Set in Stone
- B-side: "Mud in Your Eye"; "Inside Out"
- Released: 20 April 2007
- Length: 3:38
- Label: BMF
- Songwriters: Brian McFadden; Phil Thornalley
- Producer: Phil Thornalley

Brian McFadden singles chronology
"Everybody's Someone" (2006)	"Like Only a Woman Can" (2007)	"Twisted" (2008)

Music video
- "Like Only a Woman Can" on YouTube

"Like Only a Woman Can" is a song written by Irish singer Brian McFadden and Phil Thornalley. It was first released as a single in Ireland only, where it reached number one in April 2007. In March 2008, an alternative version of the song was released in Australia and New Zealand as the lead single from McFadden's second studio album, Set in Stone (2008), peaking at numbers 13 and 39, respectively. The video for the song was shot in Brisbane, Australia.

== Lyrical content ==
McFadden explained in an interview that "Like Only a Woman Can" is "an open and frank love-song to someone who has helped the writer find redemption." He went on to explain, "It's a song about Delta. Equally, it's me admitting the mistakes of my past, while looking forward to the future."

== Track listings ==
- Irish CD single
1. "Like Only a Woman Can"
2. "Mud in Your Eye" (McFadden, Graham Stack)
3. "Like Only a Woman Can" (acoustic version)
- Australian CD single
1. "Like Only a Woman Can"
2. "Inside Out" (McFadden, Tim Woodcock)
- Australian digital download
1. "Like Only a Woman Can" (Australian version) – 3:51
2. "Inside Out" – 3:56
3. "Like Only a Woman Can" (stereo radio mix) – 3:48

== Charts ==
=== Weekly charts ===
Chart (2007–2008)	Peak position
Australia (ARIA)	13
Ireland (IRMA)	1
New Zealand (Recorded Music NZ)	39

=== Year-end charts ===
Chart (2008)	Position
Australia (ARIA)	56

== Certifications ==
Region	Certification	Certified units/sales
Australia (ARIA)	Gold	35,000^{^}
^{^} Shipments figures based on certification alone.

== Release history ==
Region	Date	Format(s)	Label(s)	Ref.
Ireland	20 April 2007	CD	BMF	
Australia	24 March 2008	CD	Island; Universal; Modest!	
