= I Can't Break It to My Heart =

Single by Delta Goodrem

from the album Delta
- Released: 16 August 2008
- Recorded: Henson Studios, Hollywood, Spere Studio, London
- Genre: Pop
- Length: 4:00
- Label: Sony BMG
- Songwriters: Delta Goodrem; Kristian Lundin; Savan Kotecha
- Producer: John Shanks

Delta Goodrem singles chronology
"You Will Only Break My Heart" (2008)	"I Can't Break It to My Heart" (2008)	"Mistakes" (2010)

Alternative cover
- Limited edition cover

Music video
- "I Can't Break It To My Heart" on YouTube

"I Can't Break It to My Heart" is the fourth single from Delta Goodrem's third studio album Delta. It was released to radio on 12 July 2008. Goodrem confirmed the single in an article in the Australian issue of Cosmopolitan.

== Critical reception ==
Bill Brothetorn from Boston Herald said that: "Her strong, soaring soprano impresses throughout, especially on piano ballads 'I Can't Break It to My Heart'."

== Music video ==
Goodrem claimed on radio that the music video would be of Behind The Scenes footage most likely from the intimate concert, 'A Night With Delta Goodrem'. The music video debuted on Sunrise on 17 July 2008 and features various behind the scenes clips of Goodrem from the past few months, including photo shoots for the Australian release of Delta, travelling around Japan and the US, and many candid moments which, as her official site explains, "captures Delta out of the limelight as her natural, gorgeous self". These are all intertwined with a performance of "I Can't Break It to My Heart" from her special A Night with Delta Goodrem.

== Performance and production ==
Both the CD single and the iTunes EP went on sale on Saturday 16 August. The single received heavy promotion (a marked change from the previous single) in the form of three instore performances and signings, and appearances on morning programme Sunrise and interview programme Rove Live. The instore promotion appeared in Melbourne, Sydney and Brisbane. In an out-of-the-ordinary move, the CD single was made available for only $1.99, and the iTunes EP (containing four songs) was sold for $1.69.

== Track listing ==
CD single

1. "I Can't Break It to My Heart" – 4:00
2. "In This Life" (Diamond Cut Mix) – 4:53
3. "Burn for You" (Live at The Chapel) – 3:33

iTunes Australia EP

1. "I Can't Break It to My Heart" – 4:00
2. "In This Life" (Diamond Cut Mix) – 4:53
3. "Burn for You" (Live at The Chapel) – 3:33
4. "Edge of Seventeen" (Live Medley) [Seymour Centre] – 3:55

== Katherine Jenkins version ==
Opera singer Katherine Jenkins performed a version of the song on her album Daydream. She also released the song as a single.

== Charts ==
Chart (2008)	Peak position
Australia (ARIA)	13

=== Year-end chart ===
Chart (2008)	Rank
Australian Artist (ARIA)	46
