= Twisted (Brian McFadden song) =

Single by Brian McFadden

from the album Set in Stone
- B-side: "Patience"
- Released: 19 July 2008 (Australia)
- Recorded: 2008
- Genre: Pop
- Length: 3:54
- Label: BMF Records Ireland; Universal Music Australia
- Songwriter(s): Brian McFadden, Tommy Lee James, Stuart Crichton
- Producer(s): The Potbelleez

Brian McFadden singles chronology
"Like Only a Woman Can" (2007)	"Twisted" (2008)	"Everything but You" (2008)

"Twisted" is the second single released by Irish singer Brian McFadden from his second studio album, Set in Stone. The song was released to radio in June 2008, and was released both physically and digitally on 19 July. "Twisted" debuted on the ARIA Singles Chart at #69, solely on downloads. On the week of the release of the physical single, it climbed and peaked at #29. When released as a single, "Twisted" featured as a remix by The Potbelleez. The original version featured on the album Set in Stone was not produced by the group.

== Background ==
Speaking of the single, Brian said: "'Twisted' is a pure pop track that allows me to highlight a lighter side to my music. At the end of the day, I want to show everyone that there's some depth and variety with my new album and hopefully fans can be energised by the song. I am so grateful to my Australian fans for their support and it's time to have some fun!" The video of the song was shot in Sydney, Australia, with many scenes shot in Kings Cross. McFadden wears red make-up on his face in the video. He is seen partying and having a good time. He then gets arrested and has many photos taken of himself in prison. He is then shown racing around the streets with his friends in a convertible. This is a reference to A Clockwork Orange. The video also features his fans at parties.

== Track listing ==
- Australian CD single
1. "Twisted, Twisted" (Potbelleez Remix) – 3:36
2. "Twisted" (Album Version) – 3:54
- Australian digital download
1. "Twisted, Twisted" (Potbelleez Remix) – 3:36
2. "Twisted" (Album Version) – 3:54
3. "Patience" (Izzy Stradlin, Axl Rose) – 5:04

== Charts ==
Chart	Peak position
Australian ARIA Singles Chart	29
