= A Little Too Late (Delta Goodrem song) =

2005 single by Delta Goodrem

Single by Delta Goodrem

from the album Mistaken Identity
- B-side: "The Riddle"; "If I Forget" (demo mix)
- Released: 30 May 2005
- Length: 3:30
- Label: Epic; Daylight
- Songwriters: Gary Barlow; Delta Goodrem; Eliot Kennedy
- Producer: True North Records

Delta Goodrem singles chronology
"Almost Here" (2005)	"A Little Too Late" (2005)	"Be Strong" (2005)

"A Little Too Late" is a song written by Gary Barlow, Delta Goodrem, and Eliot Kennedy, produced by True North Records for Goodrem's second album, Mistaken Identity (2004). It was released as the album's fourth single in Australia on 30 May 2005 and reached number 13 on the country's ARIA Singles Chart.

== Chart performance ==
The song was Goodrem's 10th single to chart on the Australian ARIA Singles Chart, peaking at number 13. It was Delta's first song since her 2001 single, "I Don't Care", to not enter the top 10. After its debut at number 13, the song fell down the charts, leaving the top 20 after two weeks and spending 10 weeks in the top 50.

== Music video ==
The song's music video was directed by Anthony Rose at Point Piper, Sydney, Australia. The video was criticised by Channel V host Yumi Stynes for "resembling a tampon commercial".

== Track listing ==
Australian CD single

1. "A Little Too Late"
2. "The Riddle"
3. "If I Forget" (demo mix)
4. "A Little Too Late" (video)

== Charts ==
Chart (2005)	Peak position
Australia (ARIA)	13
