= Who's Doing the Dishes? =

British cooking game show (2014–2016)

- Genre: Cooking game show
- Presented by: Brian McFadden
- Country of origin: United Kingdom
- Original language: English
- No. of series: 3
- No. of episodes: 90

Production
- Running time: 60 minutes (inc. adverts)
- Production company: ITV Studios

Original release
- Network: ITV
- Release: 1 September 2014 – 14 October 2016

Who's Doing the Dishes? is a cooking game show that aired on ITV from 1 September 2014 to 14 October 2016 and is hosted by Brian McFadden.

== Format ==
Who's Doing the Dishes? featured four diners in a celebrity's home who cooked them a three-course meal. The diners had to guess the identity of the celebrity from six clues that the celebrity would come up with. Three were given in the names of the dishes and three were given around the house. If the diners guessed the celebrity's identity correctly, they would win a £500 cash prize and the celebrity had to wash the dishes. If they guessed wrong, the contestants had to wash the dishes themselves. In series 2, "Brian's Bonus" was introduced. This was an extra clue from McFadden, which if taken, reduced the day's winnings from £500 to £400.

== Transmissions ==
| Series | Start date | End date | Episodes |
|---|---|---|---|
| 1 | 1 September 2014 | 10 October 2014 | 30 |
| 2 | 7 September 2015 | 16 October 2015 | 30 |
| 3 | 5 September 2016 | 14 October 2016 | 30 |
