= Wall of Soundz =

Studio album by Brian McFadden
- Released: 23 April 2010
- Recorded: 2009–2010
- Genres: Electropop, dance-pop, pop rock
- Length: 42:17
- Labels: BMF Records, Island Records
- Producers: Robert Conley, Brian McFadden, Kevin Rudolf, Matt Squire, Wayne Rodrigues

Brian McFadden chronology
Set in Stone (2008)	Wall of Soundz (2010)	The Irish Connection (2013)

Wall of Soundz is the third studio album from Irish singer-songwriter, Brian McFadden. It was released in Australia on 23 April 2010. The album debuted on the ARIA Albums Chart at #27, its highest peak to date, and spent only three weeks in the ARIA top 50. The album produced McFadden's second Australian number one single, "Just Say So", which features American rapper, Kevin Rudolf and gained a platinum accreditation, as well as the second single, "Chemical Rush" which peaked within the ARIA top 15.

== Background and development ==
Wall of Soundz was originally going to be released as a side-project that McFadden embarked on with American songwriter and producer Robert Conley, known for his work with Australian singer Darren Hayes, but both decided that due to the variety of tracks, McFadden should release it as his third solo album. McFadden and Conley spent over eighteen months writing songs together for the album in Conley's studio on Sydney's Northern Beaches. In an interview with Access All Areas, McFadden said, "A new solo album would have taken another two years to write. So Rob and I sat down and we decided that this was my new solo album – it was exactly where I was musically and made perfect sense". McFadden also spent time in Los Angeles working on the album, and this is where he met up with American rapper, Kevin Rudolf, who provides guests vocals on the song, "Just Say So". McFadden explained, "I loved Kevin’s hit Let it Rock. It was good to see Kevin put his own twist on it, he did things I’d never think of doing. He’s got his own mind when it comes to records, he’s a musical genius."

The album also features a collaboration with Amy Meredith lead singer, Christian Lo Russo, on the song "Not Now". At the time, Conley was working on the album with McFadden, he was also working on Amy Meredith's debut album, and introduced Lo Russo to McFadden and wound up duetting on the track. Joel Chapman, the guitarist from Amy Meredith, co-wrote the song. McFadden also collaborated with his fiancé Delta Goodrem on the song "Mistakes". In an interview with Music Theatre Australia he explained, "I wrote Mistakes after the album was finished, but it turned out so well Rob and I made it fit with the rest of the record. When Delta heard it she wanted to sing on it." McFadden also stated in the interview that Wall of Soundz is the best album he's ever done. "I know people always say the same thing on every album 'This is the best album I’ve ever done' but for me this is definitely the best album I’ve ever done. This is the most excited I’ve ever been about an album. I haven't been this excited since the first Westlife album. It feels like a fresh start musically. It doesn't feel like just another Brian McFadden album and I love that."

== Critical reception ==
Professional ratings
Review scores
Source	Rating
The Age	3.5/5 stars
The Sydney Morning Herald	Positive
The Border Mail	3/3 stars
SX News	Negative

Upon its release, Wall of Soundz received generally mixed reviews from critics. Kylie Northover of The Age gave the album 3½ out of five stars and stated "McFadden has dispensed with the boy-band balladry – for the most part – and enlisted American producer Rob Conley to create some safely synthesised commercial dance beats over which he can croon." Andrew Murfett of The Sydney Morning Herald gave the album a positive review saying "The new album marks a shift from traditional pop-rock to a more electronic sound. Full of AutoTune and effects, the sound is very 2010." Garrett Bithell of SX News gave the album a negative review and stated "Unfortunately the material on offer here is very generic electro-pop, filled with so much auto tune McFadden’s vocals are often quite indistinguishable". He then went on saying "Overall this is disappointing, but then again my expectations weren’t high."

== Singles ==
- "Just Say So", the lead single from the album, features American rapper Kevin Rudolf. It debuted at #1 on the ARIA Singles Chart, and stayed in that position for three weeks. It spent seven weeks in the ARIA top ten and thirteen weeks in the top fifty, and became platinum. The song became McFadden's second number one single in Australia.
- "Chemical Rush" debuted at #18, before reaching its peak of #12 in its second week on the charts. It spent a total of eight weeks in the ARIA top 50. It also reached #2 on the Australian Singles Chart, which is an individual chart only for Australian artist's singles.
- "Mistakes", the third single released from the album features McFadden's fiancé at the time, Delta Goodrem. The single peaked at #41 on the ARIA Singles Chart, becoming the least successful single from the album, and his second least successful single overall.

== Track listing ==
No.	Title	Writer(s)	Producer(s)	Length
1.	"Just Say So" (featuring Kevin Rudolf)	Brian McFadden, Robert Conley, Kevin Rudolf	Robert Conley, Kevin Rudolf	3:18
2.	"Chemical Rush"	McFadden, Anthony Egizii, David Musumeci	Wayne Rodrigues	3:42
3.	"Not Now" (featuring Christian Lo Russo)	McFadden, Conley, Lo Russo, Joel Chapman	Robert Conley	2:55
4.	"Sign of the Times"	McFadden, Tim James, Antonina Armato	Matt Squire	3:14
5.	"Mr. Alien"	McFadden, Wayne Rodrigues, Andrea Remanda	Wayne Rodrigues	4:05
6.	"Love Transfusion"	McFadden, Conley, Egizii, Musumeci	Robert Conley	3:43
7.	"Less Talk"	McFadden, Conley, Egizii, Musumeci	Robert Conley	3:36
8.	"Mistakes" (featuring Delta Goodrem)	McFadden, Jez Ashurst	Jez Ashurst	3:44
9.	"Kickin' Around the Love"	McFadden, Conley	Robert Conley	3:17
10.	"Now We Only Cry"	McFadden, Conley	Robert Conley	2:48
11.	"When You Coming Home"	McFadden, Conley, Egizii, Musumeci	Robert Conley	4:36
12.	"The Smile Song" (hidden track)	McFadden, Conley	Robert Conley	3:11

iTunes Store deluxe edition bonus track
No.	Title	Writer(s)	Producer(s)	Length
13.	"Take a Bite"	McFadden, Conley	Robert Conley	3:19

== Charts ==
Chart (2010)	Peak position
ARIA Albums Chart	27

== Release history ==
Region	Date	Format	Label	Catalogue
Australia	23 April 2010	CD, digital download	Universal Music Australia	2737633
