= Believe Again =

Single by Delta Goodrem

from the album Delta
- B-side: "Fortune and Love"; "Fever" (iTunes exclusive; "Unsure" (BigPond exclusive)
- Released: 8 December 2007
- Recorded: Avalon Studios, Dublin; SCS Studios, Hastings; Strongroom Studios, London
- Genre: Dance-pop; electronica; new age
- Length: 5:46 (album version); 4:10 (radio edit); 4:06 (video version)
- Label: Sony BMG
- Songwriters: Delta Goodrem; Brian McFadden; Stuart Crichton; Tommy Lee James
- Producers: Stuart Crichton; Marius de Vries

Delta Goodrem singles chronology
"In This Life" (2007)	"Believe Again" (2007)	"You Will Only Break My Heart" (2008)

Audio sample
- file; help

Music video
- "Believe Again" on YouTube

"Believe Again" is a New Age and electronica-influenced pop song written by Delta Goodrem, Brian McFadden, Stuart Crichton and Tommy Lee James produced by Stuart Crichton and Marius de Vries for Goodrem's third studio album Delta (2007). The single, released in Australia on 8 December 2007, features exclusive remixes and the unreleased B-side track, "Fortune and Love". The single was released to radio on 12 November 2007, although it had its premiere on commercial radio in late-October 2007.

== Background ==
The song was written by Goodrem, McFadden, Stuart Crichton and Tommy Lee James just after Christmas in 2006. On writing with fiancée McFadden, Goodrem said, "He is such a brilliant writer. I was intimidated by his talent, because we have really different writing styles." Goodrem states that the song brought about the focus the album needed when she stated, "The turning point came with the album's opening song 'Believe Again'. Before that I was feeling a little unsure about the direction of the new album. That song really turned things around for me in a lot of different ways."

The song has been noted to be about overcoming life's obstacles. Goodrem also stated that for her the song means a positive, uplifting shift in her writing style. Goodrem says about the song:

"The song closed the door to an era, after years of struggling. I actually stopped writing songs after recovering from cancer because I just needed to feel free from such artistic environment."

"Believe Again is about my constant perseverance. It shows that you can overcome anything in life as long as you have a strong belief in yourself", she explained.

During Delta's special A Night with Delta Goodrem, a fan asked the question "What song was your favourite to record off the new album, Delta?", with Delta replying "Believe Again".

Due to overwhelming demand for the remix used in Goodrem's AFI performance, the "Believe Again" Diamond Cut Remix was released on the "You Will Only Break My Heart" EP released on the Australian iTunes Store.

== Music video ==
Goodrem in the video for "Believe Again".

The video, shot in a warehouse in Sydney, was filmed in the week ending 20 October by Paul J Varolo (Producer) and Michael Spiccia (Director), a friend of Goodrem. In it, Goodrem plays different mystical characters including a water nymph most likely to be the Nymph of Springs Pegaeae, a crystal-covered, cave dwelling Wiccan or Nymph and a sky goddess swathed in navy satin, most likely Aušrinė, a Lithuanian sky deity.

According to the Sun Herald newspaper, it is one of the most expensive music videos to be produced in recent years. When speaking exclusively about the video, Goodrem said: "There's flames and water – it's a real fantasy sequence, but it's quite dark. It's not going to be a bright-looking clip."

The video is the first to be released in HD resolution in Australia. The video has many special-effects, in total 109 shots according to the director, more than the average feature film. It took two days to film and six weeks to complete the special effects. Art directors from Australia, America and Spain were included in the production of the video.

The first shots from the video were incorporated into the album's television promotional commercial that has been broadcast nationally on commercial networks since the beginning of November, although these shots did not make it to the final edit of the video.

The video won the award for "Best Video of the Year" during the MTV Australia Awards of 2008. Goodrem accepted the award via satellite due to promotional commitments in the US at the time.

== Track listing ==
CD single

1. "Believe again" (radio edit) – 4:10
2. "Fortune And Love" – 3:52
3. "Believe Again" (Tommy Trash Remix) – 7:15
4. "Believe Again" (Electrodex Remix) – 3:57
5. Behind the Scenes (video)

iTunes Australia EP

1. "Believe Again" (radio edit) – 4:10
2. "Fortune and Love" – 3:52
3. "Believe Again" (Tommy Trash Remix) – 7:15
4. "Believe Again" (Electrodex Remix) – 3:57
5. "Fever" (iTunes Australia exclusive) – 3:38

BigPond Music EP

1. "Believe Again" (radio edit) – 4:10
2. "Fortune and Love" – 3:52
3. "Believe Again" (Tommy Trash Remix) – 7:15
4. "Believe Again" (Electrodex Remix) – 3:57
5. "Unsure" (BigPond Music Australia exclusive) – 2:58

== Reception and chart performance ==
"Believe Again" was officially released to radio on 12 November 2007. It became the most added song on Australian radio that week, while the previous single, "In This Life", remained in the #1 spot on the Australian Airplay Chart.

On 16 December 2007, the single debuted and peaked at #2 on the Australian Singles Chart. The track also managed to acquire Goodrem her eleventh #1 on the Australian Airplay Chart.

Five weeks after "In This Life" topped the NLP Singles Chart, "Believe Again" was released for airplay and made an impressive #1 debut on 14 September 2008, staying at the top for 2 consecutive weeks. Returning to the top 2 weeks later, giving the single a total of 3 weeks at #1. After winning the NLPMA for the Video of the Year, airplay surged, causing "Believe Again" to re-enter the top 5 at #4 on 28 December chart, in its 16th chart week.

In early March 2008, "Believe Again" received airplay in the United States on a rhythmic XM Satellite Radio station, reaching #1 on the station's playlist.

Chart (2007)	Peak position
Australian ARIA Singles Chart	2
ERROR in "CIS": Invalid position: 219. Expected number 1–200 or dash (–).

=== Year-end charts ===
Chart (2008)	Peak position
Year-End Australian ARIA Physical Singles Chart	77
Year-End Australian ARIA Australian Singles Chart	23

== Official versions and remixes ==
- Album version – 5:46
- US mix – 5:46
- Radio edit – 4:10
- Video version – 4:06
- Tommy Trash Remix – 7:15
- Tommy Trash Remix Edit – 3:45
- Tommy Trash Dub – 6:13
- Electrodex Remix – 5:27
- Electrodex Remix Edit – 3:57
- Diamond Cut Remix – 4:57
- Ron van den Beuken Remix - 3:08
