= Chemical Rush =

Single by Brian McFadden

from the album Wall of Soundz
- B-side: "Chemical Rush" (Trumpdisco Remix)
- Released: 15 June 2010 (Australia)
- Recorded: 2010
- Genre: Electropop, dance-pop
- Length: 3:32
- Label: Universal Music Australia
- Songwriter(s): Anthony Egizii, David Musumeci, James Maas, Brian McFadden
- Producer(s): Robert Conley

Brian McFadden singles chronology
| "Just Say So" (2010) | "Chemical Rush" (2010) | "Mistakes" (2010) |

"Chemical Rush" is the second single released from Irish singer Brian McFadden's third studio album, Wall of Soundz. The song was written by McFadden, Anthony Egizii, David Musumeci and James Maas, and produced by Robert Conley. It was released on 15 June 2010 by Universal Music Australia.

== Music video ==
In May 2010, McFadden started an advertisement asking for senior people to appear in the music video for his new single. Directed by Daniel Reisinger, the video sees McFadden arriving at a party under police escort, in which he portrays "a good devil" turning senior citizens back into their youth. McFadden and Reisinger worked on the video concept together. The video features over 200 extras, ranging from 20 to 95 years old.

== Track listing ==
- Digital download
1. "Chemical Rush" (Radio Mix) – 3:32
2. "Chemical Rush" (Trumpdisco Remix) – 5:19

== Chart performance ==
On 27 June 2010, the single debuted on the ARIA Singles Chart at number eighteen. A week later, it peaked at number twelve The single has peaked at number two on the Australian Singles Chart.

| Chart (2010) | Peak position |
|---|---|
| Australia (ARIA) | 12 |
| Australian Singles Chart | 2 |
