= Otis (Brian McFadden album) =

Studio album by Brian McFadden
- Released: 22 February 2019
- Recorded: 2017–2018
- Genre: Soul, R&B
- Length: 34:52
- Label: BoHo Records

Brian McFadden chronology
The Irish Connection (2013)	Otis (2019)

Singles from Otis
- 1. "Otis Singles: Direct Me / Angel" Released: October 30, 2018; 2. "Cigarettes and Coffee" Released: January 10, 2019

Otis is the fifth studio album by Irish singer-songwriter Brian McFadden, released on 22 February 2019.

== Background ==
Brian recorded Otis as a tribute to Otis Redding and other soul legends of the 1950s and the 1960s.

Before the release of the album, McFadden released "Otis Singles", consisting of two tracks: "Direct Me", and "Angel" featuring Mica Paris.

McFadden also embarked on the "Soul Jam" tour on 6 November 2018, in support the album.

== Track listing ==
Otis track listing
No.	Title	Length
1.	"A Change Is Going to Come"	4:42
2.	"Cigarettes and Coffee"	4:10
3.	"Direct Me"	2:31
4.	"Angel" (featuring Mica Paris)	3:46
5.	"Champagne and Wine"	3:09
6.	"Nobody's Fault but Mine"	2:47
7.	"Shake" (featuring Andrew Strong)	3:50
8.	"These Arms of Mine"	3:06
9.	"Security"	2:48
10.	"Loving You Too Long" (featuring Zolani Mahola)	4:03
