= Irish Son =

Studio album by Brian McFadden
- Released: 29 November 2004
- Genre: Pop; pop rock
- Length: 42:05
- Label: Sony
- Producer: Guy Chambers; Paul Stacey; Richard Flack; Mark Taylor; Phil Thornalley

Brian McFadden chronology
Irish Son (2004)	Set in Stone (2008)

Singles from Irish Son
- 1. "Real to Me" Released: 6 September 2004; 2. "Irish Son" Released: 22 November 2004; 3. "Almost Here" Released: 31 January 2005; 4. "Demons" Released: 23 May 2005

Irish Son is the debut solo album by Irish singer Brian McFadden. It was released on 29 November 2004. McFadden signed with Sony Music following his departure from boy band Westlife in 2004. The singer mainly co-wrote the album with English songwriter Guy Chambers, who produced the album along Paul Stacey, Richard Flack, Mark Taylor, and Phil Thornalley.

The album was preceded by the lead single "Real to Me" on 6 September 2004, which peaked at number one in Denmark, Ireland and the United Kingdom. Irish Son was highly successful on the charts in Denmark and Ireland. Elsewhere the album charted within the lower regions of the charts in Austria, Finland, Netherlands, New Zealand, Sweden, Switzerland and the United Kingdom.

== Critical reception ==
Professional ratings
Review scores
Source	Rating
The Guardian	3/5 stars
The Independent	3/5 stars
The Irish Times	2/5 stars
Yahoo! Music UK	4/10

David Peschek, writing for The Guardian remarked that Irish Son was "markedly less cynical and clinical than Ronan Keating's solo debut and less messy and pretentious than Robbie's. Still, while it's heartening to see anyone survive the cultural apocalypse that is Westlife svengali Simon Cowell, what we are talking about here isn't an artist, but a former boy-band hoofer struggling towards self-expression." Tony Clayton-Lea from The Irish Times wrote: "Teaming up with erstwhile Robbie Williams co-songwriter Guy Chambers, McFadden is clearly trying for the kind of commercial credibility Williams has enjoyed for some years. The results are patchy, and only some songs work." Yahoo! Music UK's Adam Webb concluded: "We'll have to wait for album number two to know quite where he falls, but there's certainly no "Angels" on Irish Son. Until then, the world belongs to Heat magazine. We'll just have to live in it."

== Track listing ==
Irish Son track listing
No.	Title	Writer(s)	Producer(s)	Length
1.	"Irish Son"	Brian McFadden; Guy Chambers	Chambers; Paul Stacey	4:20
2.	"Real to Me"	McFadden; Chambers	Chambers; Richard Flack	3:45
3.	"Demons"	McFadden; Chambers	Chambers; Flack	3:55
4.	"Lose, Lose Situation"	McFadden; Chambers	Chambers; Stacey	3:25
5.	"He's No Hero"	McFadden; Paul Barry; Mark Taylor	Taylor	3:50
6.	"Sorry, Love Daddy"	McFadden; Chambers	Chambers	3:54
7.	"Pull Myself Away"	McFadden; Chambers	Chambers; Flack	3:24
8.	"Be True to Your Woman"	McFadden; Chambers	Chambers; Flack	3:46
9.	"Walking Disaster"	McFadden; Phil Thornalley	Thornalley	3:21
10.	"Walking Into Walls"	McFadden; Barry	Taylor	3:45
11.	"Almost Here" (featuring Delta Goodrem)	McFadden; Barry; Taylor	Taylor	3:46
Total length:				42:05

Extended Edition
No.	Title	Writer(s)	Producer(s)	Length
12.	"Uncomplicated"	McFadden; Chambers	Chambers; Flack	3:42
13.	"Oblivious"	McFadden; Barry	Taylor	3:11
14.	"Optimystik"	McFadden; Barry; Taylor	Taylor	4:13
15.	"Three Babies and a Man"	McFadden; Graham Stack; Tim Woodcock	Stack	3:42
16.	"Hollow no More" (featuring Delta Goodrem)	McFadden; Goodrem; Steve Mackay	Mackay	4:00
17.	"Turn You Away" (featuring Delta Goodrem)	McFadden; Goodrem; Chambers	Chambers	3:38
18.	"Hole in the Sky"	McFadden; Chambers	Chambers; Flack	3:32
19.	"Auf Wiedersehen Bitch"	McFadden; Chambers	Chambers; Flack	4:08
20.	"Everybody's Someone" (with LeAnn Rimes)	Martin Sutton; Chris Neil	Dan Huff	3:39

== Personnel ==
Adapted from the Irish Son booklet.

- Mark Taylor – mixing (tracks 5, 10 11)
- Ren Swan – mixing (tracks 5, 10, 11)
- Nicole Nodland – front cover portrait
- Halfnight Productions, Art + Commerce – inside portraits

== Charts ==
Chart performance for Irish Son
Chart (2004–2005)	Peak position
Australian Albums (ARIA)	54
Austrian Albums (Ö3 Austria)	57
Danish Albums (Hitlisten)	5
Dutch Albums (Album Top 100)	60
Finnish Albums (Suomen virallinen lista)	33
German Albums (Offizielle Top 100)	56
Irish Albums (IRMA)	6
New Zealand Albums (RMNZ)	29
Swedish Albums (Sverigetopplistan)	31
Swiss Albums (Schweizer Hitparade)	3
Taiwanese Albums (G-Music)	13
UK Albums (OCC)	24

== Certifications ==
Certifications for Irish Son
Region	Certification	Certified units/sales
Denmark (IFPI Danmark)	Gold	20,000^{^}
^{^} Shipments figures based on certification alone.
