= Just the Way You Are (Drunk at the Bar) =

Single by Brian McFadden
- B-side: "The Smile Song"
- Released: 24 February 2011
- Recorded: 2010
- Genre: Electropop, folktronica
- Length: 3:46
- Label: Universal Music Australia
- Songwriter(s): Robert Conley, Brian McFadden
- Producer(s): McFadden, Robert Conley

Brian McFadden singles chronology
"Mistakes" (2010)	"Just the Way You Are (Drunk at the Bar)" (2011)	"Come Party / That's How Life Goes" (2011)

"Just the Way You Are (Drunk at the Bar)" is a song by Irish singer Brian McFadden, released as a single on 24 February 2011. It was written and produced by McFadden and Robert Conley. The single peaked at No. 49 on the ARIA Singles Chart. A video for the song was not released, as it was cancelled.

== Criticism ==
The song has been criticised as a glorification of date rape. McFadden cancelled the shooting of a proposed pop video for the song. He asked that the song not be played on the radio and pledged via his Twitter account to donate all proceeds from the song to rape victims.

== Chart performance ==
"Just the Way You Are (Drunk at the Bar)" debuted on the ARIA Singles Chart at number 61 on 8 March 2011, and peaked at number 49 the next week.

== Track listing ==
Australian digital download

No.	Title	Length
1.	"Just the Way You Are (Drunk at the Bar)"	3:46

== Charts ==
Chart (2010)	Peak position
ARIA Singles Chart	49
Australian Singles Chart	6
