= Mistaken Identity (Delta Goodrem album) =

Studio album by Delta Goodrem
- Released: 8 November 2004
- Studios: The Town House, Angel, Orgasmatron, Strongroom and Metrophonic (London, UK); Studios 301 and Revolution Music (Sydney, Australia); Lattanzi Studios West, Westlake Studios and Mansfield Lodge (Los Angeles, California); House of Blues (Encino, California); The Lab (Santa Monica, California); Scream (Studio City, California); Turtle Sound and the Hit Factory (New York City, New York); South Beach (Miami Beach, Florida)
- Genres: Adult contemporary; piano pop; pop rock
- Length: 59:06
- Labels: Epic; Daylight
- Producers: Gary Barlow; Guy Chambers; John Fields; Richard Flack; Matthew Gerrard; Eliot Kennedy; Billy Mann; Vince Pizzinga; Steve Power; Mark Taylor

Delta Goodrem chronology
Innocent Eyes (2003)	Mistaken Identity (2004)	Innocent Eyes (Japan) (2006)

Singles from Mistaken Identity
- 1. "Out of the Blue" Released: 11 October 2004; 2. "Mistaken Identity" Released: 17 January 2005; 3. "Almost Here" Released: 31 January 2005; 4. "A Little Too Late" Released: 30 May 2005; 5. "Be Strong" Released: 17 October 2005

Mistaken Identity is the second studio album by Australian singer Delta Goodrem. It was released in Australia on 8 November 2004, a day before Goodrem's twentieth birthday, by Epic and Daylight Records. Goodrem co-wrote all but one of the songs on the album, which was produced by Guy Chambers with Richard Flack and Steve Power. Mistaken Identity debuted at number-one on the Australian Albums Chart making it her second number-one album but the sales did not match up to her previous album Innocent Eyes (2003) which sold 4.5 million copies worldwide.

Mistaken Identity produced Goodrem two more number-one singles with "Out of the Blue" and "Almost Here", and the rest of the album's singles; "Mistaken Identity" and "A Little Too Late", became top twenty hits. The album features Goodrem's first duet, "Almost Here" (with Irish singer Brian McFadden). Goodrem toured the album with The Visualise Tour in 2005 and for its twenty-year anniversary in 2025.

== Content ==
Music was one of the main comforts for Goodrem during the chemotherapy for her Hodgkin's lymphoma cancer diagnosis. Songs kept going around in her head: harmonies, melodies, lyrics, many deeper and darker than those that were on her debut album, Innocent Eyes. Goodrem states "It's a more grown up album", "My music changed because my life had changed; the whole world around me had changed. My music had to reflect that". "Extraordinary Day" is about the day (8 July 2003) when she was diagnosed with Hodgkin's lymphoma, "The Last Night On Earth" is a song about death and love, "The Analyst" tells the story of the hours of self-analysis she dealt with, "Be Strong" is an encouraging call for confidence and "Mistaken Identity" is Goodrem stating for the record where her head was at. She also stated "There are a lot of lyrics I wouldn't have used on the first album".

"In "Mistaken Identity" I sing 'I played the role of the nice girl next door who gets cut like a knife', I mention 'emotional suicide' in "Electric Storm": there's some intense lyrics in there. It was an intense year. I mean, it wouldn't be right if I didn't acknowledge what went on; everyone knows what went on. I feel like I know people personally even though I don't, but I feel I had to go into depth; get things out of the way, go through the journey and end with "You Are My Rock", which is a thank you song."

Musically the album is more classically piano driven and ventures into pop rock and pop jazz. The single "A Little Too Late" is guitar-driven pop rock song; "Mistaken Identity" is a dark, theatrical alternative pop song; while "The Last Night On Earth" is a pop rock ballad.

Goodrem states that "This time around I had time to think 'What kind of song do I want to create here?'", "I really felt the sky was the limit with this record, you could do anything in a song. I didn't feel limited at all. There were a lot more options, a lot more paths I could go down, more directions I could choose". Songwriter Guy Chambers had been keeping an eye on Goodrem's career and was impressed with her vocals and songwriting skills. The two writing together resulted in many of the album's key tracks. "'It's really unusual to work with somebody so talented, young, and brave. Who's not scared to take risks and who has the most emotional voice in pop music", You cannot help but believe every word Delta sings." Chambers states about working with Goodrem. Goodrem stated that Chambers was a classy producer and that he was an inspiration to work with. She felt they had a good connection on a musical level. "There's a definite story in the tracklisting," Goodrem says. "I felt I had to be really honest. Songs that people could still relate to but songs that also confronted issues. This past chapter of my life has been such an intense one and I wanted people to know my thoughts".

== Singles ==
"Out of the Blue" was the first song off the album to be released and was released to radio on 24 September 2004 and quickly became the most added song to radio for that week. The music video was directed by Nigel Dick and made its premier to television on 1 October, [2004, right after the Australian soap opera Neighbours. Goodrem performed the song live for the first time on 17 October 2004 at the eighteenth Annual ARIA Awards and that same night "Out of the Blue" made its debut in the charts at number-one, Goodrem's sixth consecutive number-one single in Australia. Debuting at number-one on its first week, the song also was certified platinum by ARIA and stayed at number-one for two more weeks. The song also reached the top ten in the UK and the top twenty in Greece, Ireland, and New Zealand.

The second song lifted off the album was an Australian-only release, the title track "Mistaken Identity", released to radio on 6 December 2004, and became the second-most-added song to radio for that week. The music video for the song was directed by Michael Spiccia, released on 13 December 2004 and was based on the 1984 film The NeverEnding Story. It was released as a CD single in January 2005 and debuted at number seven on the Australian Singles Chart, the fifth highest entry for that week and was certified gold by ARIA.

"Almost Here" was the third song released from the album but was the second internationally, released on 31 January 2005. A song about a broken relationship, the video was filmed in a London airport between 27 and 29 October 2004. It became one of Goodrem's biggest hits, making it her seventh number-one single in Australia, her first in Ireland, and her fifth top ten hit in the UK, and was nominated for an ARIA Award in 2005 for "Highest Selling Single" but lost to "The Prayer" by Anthony Callea.

"A Little Too Late" was the fourth song released from the album on 30 May 2005 and the music video was directed by MTV award-winner Anthony Rose and was premiered 2 May 2005 on the Channel Ten news. The song was only released in Australia and did not chart like the other singles, debuting and peaking at number thirteen. The last song released from the album was "Be Strong", which was only released in Australia as a digital download on 17 October 2005.

== Critical reception ==
Professional ratings
Review scores
Source	Rating
AllMusic	3/5 stars
CBBC Newsround	3.0/5 stars
Entertainment.ie	4.0/5 stars
MTV Asia	5/10
Yahoo! Music UK	6/10

AllMusic editor Matthew Chisling characterizes Mistaken Identity as a darker, introspective work shaped by Goodrem's battle with lymphoma, highlighting her vocal talent, artistic maturity, and personal resilience, though its somber tone may limit mainstream appeal. Writing for MTV Asia, Jocelyn Chua found that Mistaken Identity was an introspective album reflecting her struggles after Hodgkin's disease, showcasing her sophisticated vocals but hampered by predictable structures and overly dramatic lyrics. She noted it was best suited for listeners seeking emotional resonance and reflection on love and self-discovery.

Gary Crossing from Yahoo! Music UK also noted that "Goodrem's second offering has a darker lyrical heart and views the world through older, wiser eyes" that take "us from diagnosis through illness, fear and soul-searching reflection to thankful recovery." He noted that Mistaken Identity features polished, piano-driven ballads reminiscent of Tori Amos and Kate Bush, but its safe, formulaic arrangements and lack of memorable hooks render the album pleasant yet largely unremarkable. Entertainment.ie concluded that Mistaken Identity "is mostly made up of glossy ballads, which may not be subtle but certainly pack an emotional punch. It's all down to Goodrem's strikingly raw vocals – when she gives thanks for still being alive, you can tell she really means it. A powerful album."

== Commercial performance ==
Mistaken Identity debuted at number one on the ARIA Album Chart on 15 November 2004 with triple platinum sales knocking Robbie Williams album Greatest Hits off the top spot. Unlike her debut album Innocent Eyes, Mistaken Identity only spent one week at the top, being knocked off by Eminem's album Encore, and falling to number two. In its third week, it fell to number three but in its fourth week it jumped up to number two. The album spent eight weeks in the top ten. When the album was in its fourth week in the chart and its position at number two, it had gone four times platinum and by its sixth week in the chart at number five it went five times platinum. The album spent forty-six weeks in the charts, leaving at number one hundred. It was the thirteenth-highest-selling album in Australia for 2004 and the thirtieth highest selling album for 2005. In 2005 the album was nominated for one ARIA Award, "Highest Selling Album" but lost to Missy Higgins album The Sound of White (2004). The album did not perform as well in the UK, debuting and peaking at number twenty-five and then falling to forty-four in its second week. It spent a total of ten weeks in the top seventy-five and accredited gold by BPI.

== Tours ==
=== The Visualise Tour ===
In July 2005, Goodrem embarked on her first concert tour, The Visualise Tour, in support of Mistaken Identity and Innocent Eyes. She performed 10 arena shows in Australian capital cities. The show on 24 July at Acer Arena in Sydney was filmed for the live DVD The Visualise Tour: Live in Concert, which was released on 13 November 2005. The DVD peaked at number one on the Australian ARIA DVD Chart and was certified four times platinum for sales of 60,000 units.

=== Mistaken Identity – A Night of Celebration ===
Mistaken Identity – A Night of Celebration
- Tour by Delta Goodrem
- Associated album: Mistaken Identity
- Start date: 14 April 2025
- End date: 15 May 2025
- Legs: 2
- No. of shows: 4

Delta Goodrem concert chronology
- Innocent Eyes 20th Anniversary Tour (2023); Mistaken Identity – A Night of Celebration (2025)

In April 2025, to celebrate the 20 year anniversary of Mistaken Identity, Goodrem embarked on a retrospective tour with two shows at the Sydney Opera House in Sydney, Australia, and two shows at Hackney Empire in London, England. She performed the album in its entirety and original sequence, in addition to a medley of other songs from her catalogue.

== Track listing ==
Standard edition
No.	Title	Writer(s)	Producer(s)	Length
1.	"Out of the Blue"	Delta Goodrem, Guy Chambers	Guy Chambers, Richard Flack, Steve Power	4:26
2.	"The Analyst"	Goodrem, Chambers, Cathy Dennis	Chambers, Flack, Power	3:36
3.	"Mistaken Identity"	Goodrem, Billy Mann	Billy Mann	4:01
4.	"Extraordinary Day"	Goodrem, Vince Pizzinga	Chambers, Flack, Power	4:17
5.	"A Little Too Late"	Goodrem, Gary Barlow, Eliot Kennedy	Gary Barlow, Eliot Kennedy	3:30
6.	"Be Strong"	Goodrem, Bridget Benenate, Matthew Gerrard	Matthew Gerrard	4:02
7.	"Electric Storm"	Goodrem, Chambers, Dennis	Chambers, Flack, Power	4:12
8.	"Almost Here" (with Brian McFadden)	Paul Barry, Brian McFadden, Mark Taylor	Mark Taylor	3:48
9.	"Miscommunication"	Goodrem, Chambers	Chambers, Flack	3:38
10.	"Sanctuary"	Goodrem, Chambers, Dennis	Chambers, Flack, Power	3:49
11.	"Last Night on Earth"	Goodrem, Mann, Christopher Rojas	Mann	4:08
12.	"Fragile"	Goodrem, Adrian Hannan, Barbara Hannan	Vince Pizzinga	3:37
13.	"Disorientated"	Goodrem, Pizzinga	John Fields	4:16
14.	"You Are My Rock"	Goodrem, Chambers	Chambers, Flack, Power	3:24
15.	"Nobody Listened" (Hidden track)	Goodrem, Pizzinga		4:18
Total length:				59:06

International edition
No.	Title	Writer(s)	Producer(s)	Length
1.	"Out of the Blue"	Goodrem, Chambers	Chambers, Flack, Power	4:26
2.	"The Analyst"	Goodrem, Chambers, Dennis	Chambers, Flack, Power	3:36
3.	"Mistaken Identity"	Goodrem, Mann	Mann	4:01
4.	"Sanctuary"	Goodrem, Chambers, Dennis	Chambers, Flack, Power	3:49
5.	"A Little Too Late"	Goodrem, Barlow, Kennedy	Barlow, Kennedy	3:30
6.	"Be Strong"	Goodrem, Benenate, Gerrard	Gerrard	4:02
7.	"Last Night on Earth"	Goodrem, Mann, Rojas	Mann	4:08
8.	"Almost Here" (with Brian McFadden)	Barry, McFadden, Taylor	Taylor	3:48
9.	"Miscommunication"	Goodrem, Chambers	Chambers, Flack	3:38
10.	"Electric Storm"	Goodrem, Chambers, Dennis	Chambers, Flack, Power	4:12
11.	"Extraordinary Day"	Goodrem, Pizzinga	Chambers, Flack, Power	4:17
12.	"Fragile"	Goodrem, A. Hannan, B. Hannan	Pizzinga	3:37
13.	"Disorientated" (Bonus track)	Goodrem, Pizzinga	Fields	4:16
14.	"You Are My Rock" (Bonus track)	Goodrem, Chambers	Chambers, Flack, Power	3:24
Total length:				54:48

Deluxe edition DVD
No.	Title	Length
1.	"Out of the Blue" (Music video)	4:01
2.	"Out of the Blue" (Behind the Scenes)	4:41
3.	"Europe 2004" (Behind the Scenes)	4:41
4.	"Making of Mistaken Identity"	3:38
5.	"Track by Track"	5:23

== Personnel ==
- Delta Goodrem – lead vocals (1–5, 7, 9–11, 14), backing vocals (1–5, 7, 9–11, 14), acoustic piano (1–4, 7, 10–12, 14), vocals (6, 8, 12, 13, 15)
- Guy Chambers – acoustic piano (1, 14), acoustic guitar (1, 9, 10), electric guitar (1, 2, 4, 9, 14), bass guitar (1, 2, 9), keyboards (4, 7, 10), organ (9, 14), Moog synthesizer (9), autoharp (9)
- Richard Flack – programming (1, 2, 4, 7, 9, 10, 14), tambourine (1), drum programming (2), percussion (10)
- David Arch – acoustic piano (2, 4, 7, 10)
- Vince Pizzinga – keyboards (4), electric guitar (4)
- Matthew Vaughan – programming (4)
- Gary Barlow – keyboards (5), programming (5)
- Matthew Gerrard – keyboards (6), guitars (6), bass (6)
- Marco Luciani – keyboards (6)
- Tommy Barbarella – keyboards (13)
- John Fields – keyboards (13), guitars (13), bass (13)
- Phil Palmer – acoustic guitar (1, 2, 4, 7, 10, 14), electric guitar (7)
- Eric Schermerhorn – electric guitar (1)
- Paul Stanborough – electric guitar (2)
- Tim Van der Kuil – electric guitar (2, 4, 7, 10)
- Billy Mann – guitars (3, 11), backing vocals (3, 11), additional programming (11)
- Chris Rojas – guitars (3, 11), strings (3, 11), additional programming (11)
- Eliot Kennedy – guitars (5), bass (5)
- Adam Phillips – guitars (8)
- Paul Pimsler – guitars (11)
- Peter Thorn – guitars (13)
- Guy Pratt – bass guitar (2, 4, 7, 9)
- Conrad Korsch – bass (3, 11)
- Mark Smith – bass (8)
- Dave CB – bass guitar (9, 14)
- Phil Spalding – bass guitar (10)
- Jim Anton – bass (13)
- Brian MacLeod – drums (1, 2, 4, 7, 9, 10, 14)
- Jason Dering – drums (3, 11)
- Randy Cooke – drums (6)
- Daniel Pearce – drums (7)
- Ash Soan – drums (8)
- Ian Thomas – drums (9)
- Dorian Crozier – drums (13)
- Frank Ricotti – glockenspiel (2), marimba (2), vibraphone (2, 9)
- Ken Chastain – percussion (13)
- The London Session Orchestra – strings (1, 4, 7, 10)
- Stealth Strings – strings (3, 11)
- Tessa Niles – backing vocals (2, 4, 7, 9)
- Gary Nuttall – backing vocals (2, 9)
- Ami Richardson – backing vocals (5)
- Brian McFadden – vocals (8)
- Andy Caine – backing vocals (9), additional backing vocals (14)

=== Arrangements ===
- Guy Chambers – orchestral arrangements (1, 7, 10)
- Billy Mann – arrangements (3, 11)
- Chris Rojas – arrangements (3, 11)
- Delta Goodrem – original arrangements (3)
- Vince Pizzinga – original arrangements (3), orchestral arrangements (4)
- Sally Herbert – orchestral arrangements (4, 7, 10)
- Matthew Gerrard – arrangements (6)
- Bridget Benenate – additional string arrangements (6)
- Isobel Griffiths – orchestra contractor (1, 4, 7, 10)
- Gavyn Wright – orchestra leader (1, 4, 7, 10)

=== Production ===
- David Massey – A&R
- David Gray – additional A&R
- Guy Chambers – producer (1, 2, 4, 7, 9, 10, 14)
- Richard Flack – producer (1, 2, 4, 7, 9, 10, 14)
- Steve Power – producer (1, 2, 4, 7, 10, 14)
- Billy Mann – producer (3, 11)
- True North Music Company (Gary Barlow, Eliot Kennedy and Tim Woodcock) – producers (5)
- Matthew Gerrard – producer (6)
- Mark Taylor – producer (8)
- Vince Pizzinga – producer (12, 15)
- John Fields – producer (13)
- Jenny Sullivan – design
- Sheryl Nields – photography

=== Technical ===
- Ted Jensen – mastering at Sterling Sound (New York, NY, USA)
- Richard Flack – recording (1, 2, 4, 7, 9, 10, 14), mixing (1, 2, 4, 7, 9, 10, 14)
- Mat Bartram – orchestra engineer (1, 4, 7)
- Steve Price – orchestra engineer (1, 4, 7)
- Jim Briggs – engineer (3, 11)
- Billy Mann – engineer (3, 11)
- Michael McCoy – engineer (3, 11)
- Jason Rankins – engineer (3, 11)
- Chris Rojas – engineer (3, 11)
- Tom Lord-Alge – mixing (3, 11)
- Robbie Adams – engineer (5)
- Mark Endert – mixing (5, 6, 12)
- Krish Sharma – piano and drums recording (6)
- Ren Swan – mixing (8), Pro Tools editing (8)
- Mark Taylor – mixing (8)
- Phillip McKellar – engineer (12)
- John Fields – recording (13), mixing (13)
- Steven Miller – mixing (13)
- Jim Brumby – additional engineer (1, 2, 4, 7, 10, 14), additional Pro Tools editing (14)
- Paul Stanborough – additional Pro Tools editing (1, 2, 4, 7, 9, 10), additional engineer (9)
- Daniel Porter – assistant engineer (1, 2, 4, 7, 9, 10, 14)
- Tim Roe – mix assistant (2, 9)
- Femio Hernandez – assistant engineer (3, 11)
- Tom Paterson – mix assistant (4, 10)
- Ryan Carline – assistant engineer (5)
- Doug Tyo – assistant engineer (6)
- Chris Wilcox – assistant engineer (7)
- Alex Smith – Pro Tools editing assistant (8)
- Michael Morgan – assistant engineer (12)
- Matt Beckley – assistant engineer (13)

== Charts ==
=== Weekly charts ===
Weekly chart performance
Chart (2004)	Peak position
Australian ARIA Albums Chart	1
Austrian Albums Chart	62
European Top 100 Albums	79
German Albums Chart	59
Irish Albums Chart	39
New Zealand Albums Chart	7
Swiss Albums Chart	50
UK Albums Chart	25

=== Year-end charts ===
2004 year-end chart performance
Chart (2004)	Position
Australian ARIA Albums Chart	13

2005 year-end chart performance
Chart (2005)	Position
Australian ARIA Albums Chart	30

=== Decade-end chart ===
Decade-end chart performance
Chart (2000–2009)	Position
Australian Albums (ARIA)	64
Australian Artist Albums (ARIA)	21

== Certifications ==
Certifications and sales
Country	Certification	Sales
Australia	5× Platinum	350,000
New Zealand	Platinum	15,000
United Kingdom	Gold	100,000

== Release history ==
Region	Date	Label	Format	Catalog
Australia	8 November 2004	Epic; Daylight	CD; cassette	5189152000
United Kingdom	22 November 2004	Epic	CD; cassette	5189159000
Germany	29 November 2004	Epic	CD; cassette	5099751891598
United States	28 December 2004	SMA Recordings	Digital download	N/A
