= You Will Only Break My Heart =

Single by Delta Goodrem

from the album Delta
- Released: 29 March 2008
- Recorded: Avalon Studios, Dublin; SCS Studios, Hastings; Strongroom Studios, London
- Genre: Pop; dance-pop; reggae-pop
- Length: 3:03
- Label: Sony BMG
- Songwriters: Delta Goodrem; Brian McFadden; Stuart Crichton; Tommy Lee James
- Producers: Stuart Crichton; Marius de Vries

Delta Goodrem singles chronology
"Believe Again" (2007)	"You Will Only Break My Heart" (2008)	"I Can't Break It to My Heart" (2008)

Radio promo cover

Music video
- "You Will Only Break My Heart" on YouTube

"You Will Only Break My Heart" is the third single from Delta Goodrem's third studio album Delta. It was released to Australian radio on 25 February and will have a physical release on 29 March. Its music video includes clips of fans singing the song based on a competition via her website.

== Background ==
The song was written by Brian McFadden, Stuart Crichton and Tommy Lee James, with Delta Goodrem. It was produced by Crichton and Marius de Vries. It discusses choosing not to associate with a future lover because he will only break her heart and he never tells her whats on his mind. Seen in the lyrics. The song is a perky reggae sing along song. Seen in reception.

== Reception ==
The song was well received for its upbeat perky music and reggae vibe. It is called a "frolicking reggae finger-snapper", "a sense of fun in her music" and "follows through with everything from the fun electronica/reggae"

== Track listing ==
CD single

1. "You Will Only Break My Heart" – 3:06
2. "Black Velvet" (Live at Max Sessions) – 4:47
3. "You Will Only Break My Heart" (Diamond Cut remix) – 3:43
4. "You Will Only Break My Heart" (Ah Ah Ah Ah Sing Along mix) – 3:07
5. "Believe Again" (AFI performance video)
6. "Believe Again" (Interactive U-MYX mix)

iTunes Australia EP

1. "You Will Only Break My Heart" – 3:06
2. "Black Velvet" (Live at Max Sessions) – 4:47
3. "You Will Only Break My Heart" (Diamond Cut remix) – 3:43
4. "You Will Only Break My Heart" (Ah Ah Ah Ah Sing Along mix) – 3:07
5. "Believe Again" (Diamond Cut remix) – 4:46

== Music video ==
The video premiered on Goodrem's YouTube channel. The video shows many boxes that constantly change between the fan submitted videos and Delta's five different personas.

Natural Delta is sitting on a couch watching the entries through her red Vaio laptop.
Punk Rock Delta holds a red guitar and a black wig, with tattoos on her arm.
Hard Rock Delta sports a blonde wig and is playing the drums.
Fortune Teller Delta (Hippie Delta; or as Delta states: "Tori Amos"-style piano player) is playing a piano with candles on it.
Diva Delta sings to the song very "dramatically" into a microphone.

== Chart performance ==
It was the most added track to radio on its week of radio release. The song became the most added song on radio after it was released in March and has since gone on to top the Australian Airplay Chart.

It debuted and peaked at #14 on the Australian Singles Chart. It spent only 7 weeks in the top 50 ARIA Singles Chart mainly because it charted lowly in its second week, in which it dropped to #26.

On Sunday 13 July, "You Will Only Break My Heart" re-entered the Top 50 ARIA Physical Chart placed at #49.

== Charts ==
Chart (2008)	Peak position
Australian ARIA Singles Chart	14
CIS Airplay (TopHit)	160

=== End-of-year charts ===
Year	Chart	Ranking
2008	ARIA End-of-Year Charts – Australian Artist Singles	#30
2008	ARIA End of Year Charts – Physical Singles	#67
