= Set in Stone (Brian McFadden album) =

Studio album by Brian McFadden
- Released: 19 April 2008
- Recorded: 2006–2008
- Genre: Alternative rock, pop rock
- Length: 40:38
- Label: BMF Records Ireland
- Producer: Stuart Crichton, Eg White, Guy Chambers

Brian McFadden chronology
Irish Son (2004)	Set in Stone (2008)	Wall of Soundz (2010)

Singles from Set in Stone
- 1. "Like Only a Woman Can" Released: 20 April 2007; 2. "Twisted" Released: 19 July 2008; 3. "Everything But You" Released: 15 November 2008

Professional ratings
Review scores
Source	Rating
Allmusic	3/5 stars
CountryHQ	

Set in Stone is the second solo album by former Westlife member Brian McFadden. The album was released in Australia and New Zealand on 19 April 2008. It was released in the UK and Europe in the summer.

== Singles ==
The first single released in Australia and New Zealand was a new version of "Like Only a Woman Can". The second single released was "Twisted", according to the Herald Sun. "Twisted" was released both as a physical and digital single on 19 July. The first single in UK and Europe was "Everything But You", however, it failed to chart in the UK or Ireland. It was also the third single in Australia, peaking at #99 on the ARIA Singles Chart on downloads alone.

Set in Stone peaked at #5 on the ARIA Albums Chart.

== Track listing ==
No.	Title	Writer(s)	Producer(s)	Length
1.	"Twisted"	Brian McFadden, Stuart Crichton, Tommy Lee James	Stuart Crichton	3:53
2.	"Like Only a Woman Can"	McFadden, Phil Thornalley	Crichton	3:52
3.	"Get Away"	McFadden, Chris Braide, Jez Ashurst	Crichton	3:24
4.	"Room to Breathe"	McFadden, Crichton, Lee James	Crichton	5:33
5.	"Jones"	McFadden, Eg White	Crichton	2:58
6.	"Alice in Wonderland"	McFadden, White	Crichton, White	4:06
7.	"Everything But You"	McFadden, Ashurst	Crichton	4:03
8.	"Forgive Me Twice"	McFadden, Delta Goodrem, Crichton, Lee James	Crichton	4:26
9.	"Zoomer"	McFadden, Guy Chambers	Crichton	3:34
10.	"Set in Stone"	McFadden, Chambers	Chambers	4:49

== Release history ==
Country	Date
Australia	19 April 2008
Philippines	19 March 2009
