= Irish Son (song) =

2004 single by Brian McFadden

Single by Brian McFadden

from the album Irish Son
- B-side: "Be True to Your Woman"; "Optimystik"; "Three Babies and a Man"
- Released: 22 November 2004
- Length: 4:22
- Label: Sony Music UK
- Songwriters: Brian McFadden; Guy Chambers
- Producers: Guy Chambers; Paul Stacey

Brian McFadden singles chronology
"Real to Me" (2004)	"Irish Son" (2004)	"Almost Here" (2005)

Music video
- "Irish Son" on YouTube

"Irish Son" is a song written by Guy Chambers and Brian McFadden and produced by Chambers and Paul Stacey for McFadden's first solo album, Irish Son (2004). It was released as the album's second single in the United Kingdom on 22 November 2004.

The song was released following a large media build-up due to the success of his first single. However, the launch of the song was marred by controversy when many radio stations and music channels banned the song and its accompanying music video due to the song's lyrical content and the bad reflection focused on CBS schools in Ireland. Elton John slammed the song's lyrical content when he reviewed the track in Time Out, claiming the song was "just horrible". With the bad press surrounding the song, it peaked at number six.

== Track listings ==
UK CD1

1. "Irish Son" – 4:20 (Brian McFadden, Guy Chambers)
2. "Be True to Your Woman" – 3:46 (McFadden, Chambers)

UK CD2

1. "Irish Son" – 4:20 (McFadden, Chambers)
2. "Optimystik" – 4:13 (McFadden, Paul Barry, Mark Taylor)
3. "Three Babies and a Man" – 3:42 (McFadden, Graham Stack, Tim Woodcock)
4. "Irish Son" (video) – 4:20

== Charts ==
=== Weekly charts ===
Chart (2004–2005)	Peak position
Ireland (IRMA)	2
New Zealand (Recorded Music NZ)	33
Scottish Singles Sales (Official Charts)	2
UK Singles (Official Charts)	6
UK Airplay (Music Week)	17

=== Year-end charts ===
Chart (2004)	Position
UK Singles (OCC)	132

== Release history ==
Region	Date	Format	Label	Catalogue	Ref.
United Kingdom	22 November 2004	2× CD	Sony Music UK	675487 1; 675487 2	
