= Mistakes (Brian McFadden song) =

Single by Brian McFadden featuring Delta Goodrem

from the album Wall of Soundz
- B-side: "Mistakes" (album version)
- Released: 17 September 2010
- Recorded: 2010
- Genre: Synthpop; pop rock; electropop; dance-pop; pop
- Length: 3:39
- Label: Universal Music Australia
- Songwriters: Jez Ashurst; Brian McFadden
- Producers: McFadden; Robert Conley

Brian McFadden singles chronology
"Chemical Rush" (2010)	"Mistakes" (2010)	"Just the Way You Are (Drunk at the Bar)" (2011)

Delta Goodrem singles chronology
"I Can't Break It to My Heart" (2008)	"Mistakes" (2010)	"I'm Not Ready" (2011)

Music video
- "Mistakes" on YouTube

"Mistakes" is the third single released from Irish singer Brian McFadden's third studio album, Wall of Soundz. The song was written by McFadden and Jez Ashurst, and was produced by McFadden and Robert Conley. The single was released on 17 September 2010 and features McFadden's then-fiancée, Delta Goodrem. The song appears to be about a dysfunctional and destructive relationship. "You keep dragging me down, you keep dragging me down/I'm drowning in you/Theres no hope for me now, theres no hope for me now/I should have walked away" sourced at the song lyrics pages.

== Track listing ==
Australian digital download

No.	Title	Length
1.	"Mistakes" (radio mix)	3:43
2.	"Mistakes" (video)	3:39

== Music video ==
Filmed in Sydney during August 2010, the video for the song was directed by Dan Reisinger and is based on the film Mr. & Mrs. Smith. The video starts off with a romantic dinner that triggers an explosive domestic dispute. Throughout the rest of the video, Goodrem is seen throwing a glass of red wine, aiming at McFadden's forehead and starts bleeding. She also throws his watch in a blender and smashes one of his platinum discs. She then uses the disc to slice his guitar while he retaliates by using the chainsaw to turn Goodrem's piano into firewood. McFadden is also seen putting Goodrem's teddy bear in the microwave to see how long it takes to heat it up, until it blows up the kitchen.

== Chart performance ==
Chart (2010)	Peak position
ARIA Singles Chart	41
Australian Singles Chart	7
