= Demons (Brian McFadden song) =

2005 single by Brian McFadden

Single by Brian McFadden

from the album Irish Son
- B-side: "Hole in the Sky"; "Auf Wiedersehen Bitch"
- Released: 23 May 2005
- Length: 3:53
- Label: Sony Music
- Songwriter(s): Guy Chambers, Brian McFadden
- Producer(s): Guy Chambers, Mark Taylor, Paul Barry

Brian McFadden singles chronology
"Almost Here" (2004)	"Demons" (2005)	"Everybody's Someone" (2006)

"Demons" was the fourth single taken from Irish singer Brian McFadden's debut solo album, Irish Son (2004). The song failed to match the success of his previous solo releases, and was unable to reach the top ten on the UK Singles Chart. The song peaked at number 24 on the Irish Singles Chart and number 28 on the UK Singles Chart, becoming McFadden's worst performing single. This resulted in his record deal being cut and McFadden parting with his record label. The music video for the song was directed by Howard Greenhalgh.

== Track listings ==
UK CD1

1. "Demons" (radio edit) – 3:36 (Brian McFadden, Guy Chambers)
2. "Hole in the Sky" – 3:32 (Brian McFadden, Guy Chambers)

UK CD2

1. "Demons" (album version) – 3:57 (Brian McFadden, Guy Chambers)
2. "Auf Wiedersehen Bitch" – 4:08 (Brian McFadden, Guy Chambers)
3. "Demons" (live at the Belfast Empire, 27 November 2004) – 4:04 (Brian McFadden, Guy Chambers)
4. "Be True to Your Woman" (live at the Belfast Empire, 27 November 2004) – 3:57 (Brian McFadden, Guy Chambers)
5. "Demons" (video)
