= Mistaken Identity (Delta Goodrem song) =

2005 single by Delta Goodrem

Single by Delta Goodrem

from the album Mistaken Identity
- B-side: "Silence Be Heard"; "How a Dream Looks"
- Released: 17 January 2005
- Studio: Turtle Sound (New York City)
- Length: 4:01
- Label: Epic; Daylight
- Songwriters: Billy Mann; Delta Goodrem
- Producer: Billy Mann

Delta Goodrem singles chronology
"Out of the Blue" (2004)	"Mistaken Identity" (2005)	"Almost Here" (2005)

Audio sample
- file; help

Music video
- "Mistaken Identity" on YouTube

"Mistaken Identity" is a song written by Billy Mann and Delta Goodrem. It was produced and co-written by Mann for Goodrem's second album, Mistaken Identity (2004). The song was released in Australia as the album's second single on 17 January 2005 and peaked at number seven on the Australian Singles Chart, breaking Goodrem's run of six consecutive number-one singles.

== History ==
"Mistaken Identity" opens with lyrics about Goodrem's cancer ordeal and how it changed her outlook on life. During the chorus, Goodrem sings, "The girl I used to be has a terrible case of mistaken identity, yesterday's girl is not what you see, it's a terrible case of mistaken identity". Lyrically, the song is darker, harsher, and edgier than Goodrem's previous recordings, and is written in a nine-eight time signature. Goodrem admitted that she had to fight the record company for it to be released.

The single was not as successful as Goodrem's previous releases and ended her streak of six consecutive number ones on the Australian charts when it debuted and peaked at number seven in January 2005. It was certified gold but quickly fell down the charts, spending only seven weeks in the top 50.

== Track listing ==
Australian CD single

1. "Mistaken Identity" – 4:02
2. "Silence Be Heard" – 4:23
3. "How a Dream Looks" – 4:21
4. "Mistaken Identity" (video) – 4:09

== Charts ==
Chart (2005)	Peak position
Australia (ARIA)	7

== Certifications ==
Region	Certification	Certified units/sales
Australia (ARIA)	Gold	35,000^{^}
^{^} Shipments figures based on certification alone.
