= In This Life (Delta Goodrem song) =

2007 single by Delta Goodrem

Single by Delta Goodrem

from the album Delta
- B-side: "Take Me Home"; "Breathe In, Breathe Out"
- Released: 17 September 2007
- Studio: Henson (Hollywood, California, US)
- Length: 3:47
- Label: Sony BMG; Mercury
- Songwriters: Delta Goodrem; Brian McFadden; Stuart Crichton; Tommy Lee James
- Producer: John Shanks

Delta Goodrem singles chronology
"Together We Are One" (2006)	"In This Life" (2007)	"Believe Again" (2007)

Audio sample
- file; help

Music video
- "In This Life" on YouTube

"In This Life" is a song by Australian singer-songwriter Delta Goodrem. It was released as the first single from her third album Delta. The song was written by Goodrem, Brian McFadden, Stuart Crichton, and Tommy Lee James and was produced by John Shanks. According to an article in the Herald Sun, the song is "a more guitar-driven vibe and updates Goodrem's sound."

The song was released on Australian radio on 28 August 2007 and had a physical release through CD and digital download on 17 September 2007. It was also released as the first single in the United States on 15 April 2008.

== Background ==
According to Goodrem, she wrote the song just after Christmas. Stuart Crichton co-wrote the song and wanted the singer to use her well-known letter ending "Love & Light" in a song. In the start of the chorus, Goodrem sings:

You give me love,
You give me light

Goodrem told The Daily Telegraph that she needed to deal with personal demons and feelings first to be able to write a song like "In This Life". According to her biography on her official site, the song "reaffirms new beginnings, celebrates perseverance, and rejoices in moving forward." Goodrem also stated that "In This Life" was a great introduction for her new album. During a chat session on her official forum, Goodrem said the song was about "the journey you go on in this life and accepting what life throws at you and growing from the experience and concentrating on the positives in life."

The song was also used as the third opening theme music to the Japanese anime series Deltora Quest, which ran from 2007 to 2008.

== Reviews ==
The song received positive reviews which praises Goodrem's new sound and look. News.com.au commented: "'In This Life' is undoubtedly a Delta Goodrem song, it unveils a more sexy and mature sound for the artist who dominated the Australian airwaves after the release of her debut single, 'Born to Try'." The Herald Sun said "'In This Life' has a more guitar-driven vibe and updates Goodrem's sound."

Billboard magazine gave the song a positive review, introducing Goodrem in the United States. Reviewer Chuck Taylor said about the song: "In This Life" is an ideal vehicle to fuel horsepower, showcasing frantic piano, turbine tempo, a singalong lyric about giving into love ... and a vocal that illustrates incomparable prowess."

== Music video ==
The video for the song was shot in Los Angeles on 10 August 2007, directed by Rocky Schenck. According to insiders, the video is the sexiest Goodrem has made to date, with Goodrem having a Brigitte Bardot look in several scenes. Goodrem herself said about making the video; "It took me a second to get back into gear because I haven't made a video for so long, but it felt better than ever."

The video premiered on 31 August 2007 on the TV program Sunrise. Although the video has been criticised for being too "basic", it has been praised for its effectiveness by intentionally having a simple video with the focus placed upon Goodrem's personality thus creating a fresh and bright mood rather than a story and having special effects. Goodrem had also stated that she had wanted it to be about her singing the song.

In late March, Goodrem returned from California, where she filmed a new clip for the US version of "In This Life". The video clip, in which she stretches seductively on a stretch of sand on Malibu Beach, will be used to introduce her to the US audiences, as well as a photoshoot for the new cover of her self-titled album, Delta, which was released in the US in July. For the new video she worked with director Robert Hales (who has also shot videos for Justin Timberlake and Gnarls Barkley) who choose to give a good introduction of Goodrem: her basics as an artist. Goodrem says about the video: "It's quite earthy and creative. It's going to be an introduction for me. I have to be at the piano. I have to introduce myself and say 'Here I am, this new artist'." The video premiered on Universal Music Group's YouTube channel on 15 May 2008. Throughout the video different leaves are created around her that can be compared with the way Goodrem's Mistaken Identity album cover was designed.

== Chart performance ==
Upon its release, "In This Life" was the most added song on Australian radio. It debuted at number six on the national airplay chart, earning Goodrem the highest debut ever on the chart at the time. The week after it moved to number two, before eventually climbing to the top spot and displacing Matchbox Twenty's "How Far We've Come".

"In This Life" debuted atop the Australian Singles Chart, earning Goodrem her eighth number one single and putting her behind Kylie Minogue and Madonna as the female artist with the most number one singles at the time. The song also debuted at number one on the Physical Sales Chart, whilst starting at number three on the Digital Tracks Chart; it later peaked at number two there. The song replaced "Beautiful Girls" by Sean Kingston but was replaced itself by the latter the following week. It spent eight consecutive weeks in the top ten, and was present in the top 50 for a total of 18 weeks. "In This Life" was certified gold by the ARIA for shipments of 35,000 copies in its first week, and has since been certified two-times platinum for sales of 140,000 units.

Outside Australia, "In This Life" appeared on the official French airplay chart at number 85. In New Zealand, the song became the tenth most added song to radio during the Christmas week and peaked at number eight on the radio airplay charts. On the main New Zealand Music Chart, the track peaked at number 31. In Asia, it debuted at number nine on the MTV Asia Hitlist and peaked at number two. On the Japanese download charts, it peaked at number one. "In This Life" was released to US radio on in April 2008, and marked Goodrem's second entry on a Billboard chart in June when it debuted at number 40 on the Adult Top 40 chart. The song later peaked at number 21. According to Nielsen SoundScan, the track sold 7,000 digital downloads in the week ending on 24 June 2008.

== Track listing ==
Australian CD single 1

1. "In This Life"
2. "Take Me Home"

:Comes with bonus sticker

Australian CD single 2

1. "In This Life"
2. "In This Life" (acoustic version)

:Comes with bonus poster

Australian iTunes exclusive

1. "In This Life"
2. "Breathe In, Breathe Out"

Japanese CD single

1. "In This Life"
2. "Take Me Home"
3. "In This Life" (acoustic version)

US digital single

1. "In This Life" (updated mix)

== Charts ==
=== Weekly charts ===
Weekly chart performance for "In This Life"
Chart (2007–2008)	Peak position
Australia (ARIA)	1
New Zealand (Recorded Music NZ)	31
US Adult Pop Airplay (Billboard)	21

=== Year-end charts ===
Year-end chart performance for "In This Life"
Chart (2007)	Position
Australia (ARIA)	15

== Certifications ==
Certification for "In This Life"
Region	Certification	Certified units/sales
Australia (ARIA)	2× Platinum	140,000^{‡}
^{‡} Sales+streaming figures based on certification alone.

== Release history ==
Release history for "In This Life"
Region	Date	Ref.
Australia	17 September 2007	
Japan	23 January 2008	
United States	15 April 2008	
