= Everything but You (Brian McFadden song) =

Single by Brian McFadden

from the album Set in Stone
- Released: 15 November 2008
- Genre: Pop
- Length: 4:02
- Label: BMF Records Ireland; Universal Music Australia
- Songwriter(s): Brian McFadden, Jez Ashurst

Brian McFadden singles chronology
"Twisted" (2008)	"Everything but You" (2008)	"Just Say So" (2010)

"Everything but You" is the third and final single from singer Brian McFadden's second album Set in Stone. It was released in November 2008 via iTunes.

== Music video ==
The video of the song was shot in Sydney, Australia, (like the previous video for "Twisted") by the same director used for the "Twisted" video. It shows Brian in the studio 'recording' the song. Brian also had broken fingers during the video which was well hidden in the final version.

== Track listing ==
Australian digital single

1. "Everything but You"
2. "Like Only a Woman Can" (Irish version)

== Charts ==
Chart performance for "Everything but You"
Chart (2008)	Peak position
Australia (ARIA)	99
