= Out of the Blue (Delta Goodrem song) =

2004 single by Delta Goodrem

Single by Delta Goodrem

from the album Mistaken Identity
- B-side: "Visualise"; "Beautiful Madness"; "How a Dream Looks"
- Released: 11 October 2004
- Length: 4:19
- Label: Epic; Daylight
- Songwriters: Delta Goodrem; Guy Chambers
- Producers: Guy Chambers; Richard Flack; Steve Power

Delta Goodrem singles chronology
"Predictable" (2003)	"Out of the Blue" (2004)	"Mistaken Identity" (2005)

Music video
- "Out of the Blue" on YouTube

Audio sample
- "Out of the Blue": file; help

"Out of the Blue" is a song written by Delta Goodrem and Guy Chambers, produced by Chambers, Richard Flack, and Steve Power for Goodrem's second studio album, Mistaken Identity (2004). It was released as the album's first single in Australia on 11 October 2004 as a CD single and became Goodrem's sixth consecutive number-one hit on the Australian Singles Chart.

== About the record ==
Goodrem announced the release of the song on 3 September 2004. She and Chambers worked together on her debut album Innocent Eyes and he offered to work with her several times on the new album. Goodrem states "Guy was such an inspiration to work with, besides being such a talented musician on so many instruments I felt we had a real connection on a musical level. He makes a lot of classical music and I'm classically trained so we both knew where songs should go and also when it wasn't right. We could bring something out of each other to create something unique. Once we had 'Out of the Blue' we knew we had something special".

Goodrem says the song is "being about times when someone comes into your life unexpectedly, and what a positive effect that can have on you" being about her then boyfriend Mark Philippoussis and the support he gave her. When the relationship ended Goodrem states she found a new meaning for the song.

== Promotion and chart performance ==
The song was released to radio on 24 September 2004 and became the most added song to airplay. The song was later performed at the ARIA awards and it was her first performance at the ARIA awards. The song debuted at number one on the ARIA Charts, becoming her sixth consecutive number-one single and topping the chart for three weeks. The song was certified platinum in its first week. It spent a total of 16 weeks in the top 50 ending the run at position 50 and spent 23 weeks in the top 100. It was the 20th-highest-selling single in Australia for 2004.

The song peaked within the top 20 in Greece, Ireland and New Zealand. It peaked at number nine in the United Kingdom and spent a total of nine weeks in the top 75, ending its run at number 75.

== Music video ==
The video for her single was filmed on the coast of Malibu, California and was directed by Nigel Dick. It premiered on Channel Ten Australia after an episode of Neighbours on 1 October 2004, a news spot on her website stating "The clip will fittingly go to air during Neighbours – Australia's most successful and longest running soapie – to mark Delta's final episodes in the show as the hugely popular character Nina Tucker".

The start of the video opens up to Delta sitting on a beach in a green dress. After a while Delta gets up and walks across the beach with the waves washing on her feet. When the chorus comes around the second time Delta has changed into a pink dress and walks up a hill into a forest and finds her piano and starts playing it. After she has finished playing it the piano catches on fire and Delta sings at the camera then runs away ending the video. Delta has stated that at the time of making the video, she was intrigued by the classical elements—earth, wind, fire, and water. All elements can be seen in the video clip.

== Track listings ==
Australian CD single

1. "Out of the Blue"
2. "Visualise"
3. "Beautiful Madness"

European and UK CD1

1. "Out of the Blue" (album version) – 4:25
2. "Visualise" – 4:00

European CD2

1. "Out of the Blue"
2. "Visualise"
3. "How a Dream Looks"

UK CD2

1. "Out of the Blue" (album version) – 4:25
2. "How a Dream Looks" (album version) – 4:14
3. "Beautiful Madness" (album version) – 3:03
4. "Out of the Blue" (video)

German mini-CD single

1. "Out of the Blue"
2. "Beautiful Madness"

== Charts ==
=== Weekly charts ===
Chart (2004–2005)	Peak position
Australia (ARIA)	1
Austria (Ö3 Austria Top 40)	46
Germany (GfK)	54
Greece (IFPI)	14
Ireland (IRMA)	15
New Zealand (Recorded Music NZ)	14
Scotland Singles (OCC)	10
Switzerland (Schweizer Hitparade)	60
UK Singles (OCC)	9

=== Year-end charts ===
Chart (2004)	Position
Australia (ARIA)	20

== Certifications ==
Region	Certification	Certified units/sales
Australia (ARIA)	Platinum	70,000^{^}
^{^} Shipments figures based on certification alone.

== Release history ==
Region	Date	Format(s)	Label(s)	Catalogue	Ref.
Australia	11 October 2004	CD	Epic; Daylight	675374.2	
United Kingdom	8 November 2004	CD	Epic; Daylight	675473 1	
United Kingdom	8 November 2004	CD	Epic; Daylight	675473 2	
