= Almost Here (Brian McFadden and Delta Goodrem song) =

2005 single by Brian McFadden and Delta Goodrem

- UK CD 1 and Australian CD single cover

Single by Brian McFadden and Delta Goodrem

from the album Irish Son and Mistaken Identity
- B-side: "Hollow No More"; "Turn You Away"
- Released: 31 January 2005
- Studio: Metrophonic (Ripley, England)
- Genre: Pop
- Length: 3:48
- Label: Sony Music; Modest!
- Songwriters: Brian McFadden; Paul Barry; Mark Taylor
- Producer: Mark Taylor

Brian McFadden singles chronology
"Irish Son" (2004)	"Almost Here" (2005)	"Demons" (2005)

Delta Goodrem singles chronology
"Mistaken Identity" (2005)	"Almost Here" (2005)	"A Little Too Late" (2005)

Music video
- "Almost Here" on YouTube

"Almost Here" is a song by Irish singer Brian McFadden and Australian singer Delta Goodrem. Written by McFadden, Paul Barry and Mark Taylor, and produced by Taylor, the song appears on McFadden's debut studio album, Irish Son, and on Goodrem's second studio album, Mistaken Identity. "Almost Here" was released as a single in the United Kingdom on 31 January 2005 and in Australia on 7 March 2005. The duet reached number one in both singers' home countries and charted within the top three in Denmark, Norway, and the United Kingdom.

== Composition ==
The song is considered pop, having an influence of folk music. The song is a duet and it features an antiphon. The recording has an emphasis on the instrumental arranging, which is backed up by a string section. The song is written in the key of A minor and moves at a tempo of 78 beats per minute. It has the sequence of Am–G–Dm_{7} as its chord progression.

== Release and chart performance ==
Released in the United Kingdom on 31 January 2005, the song made its first chart appearance in Brian McFadden's native Ireland, where it debuted at number two on 3 February 2005 and peaked at number one the following week. Two days later, the song debuted and peaked at number three on the UK Singles Chart; it would become Delta Goodrem's final UK chart entry. The song also debuted at number three in Denmark, and in its third week, it reached its peak of number two and remained in the top 10 for 12 weeks. On 7 March 2005, "Almost Here" was released in Goodrem's native Australia. On the week starting 14 March, it debuted at number one, staying in the top 10 for eight weeks and earning a platinum certification for shipments of more than 70,000.

== Music video ==
In the accompanying music video, McFadden is seen to be chasing after Goodrem through an airport, after she forgets her handbag. There are two alternate endings to the video: the "happy" ending, where McFadden and Goodrem are reunited in the taxi as it drives away from the airport, and the "sad" ending, where McFadden is by himself after the taxi leaves with Goodrem inside. The "sad" ending appears on the DVD The Life of Brian: Six Months in the Life of Brian McFadden, while the "happy" ending appears on the single's physical release.

== Track listings ==
- UK CD 1 and German mini-CD single
1. "Almost Here" (Brian McFadden and Delta Goodrem) (Brian McFadden, Paul Barry, Mark Taylor) – 3:46
2. "Hollow No More" (Brian McFadden and Delta Goodrem) (McFadden, Delta Goodrem, Steve Mackay) – 4:00
- UK CD 2 and European CD single
1. "Almost Here" (Brian McFadden and Delta Goodrem) – 3:46
2. "Real to Me" (Brian McFadden, live at The Belfast Empire, 27 November 2004) (McFadden, Guy Chambers) – 4:37
3. "Irish Son" (Brian McFadden, live at The Belfast Empire, 27 November 2004) (McFadden, Chambers) – 5:03
4. "Almost Here" (video)
- Australian CD single
1. "Almost Here" (Delta Goodrem and Brian McFadden) – 3:46
2. "Hollow No More" (Delta Goodrem and Brian McFadden) (McFadden, Goodrem, Mackay) - 4:00
3. "Turn You Away" (Delta Goodrem) (Goodrem, Chambers) – 3:38
4. "Almost Here" (video)

== Credits and personnel ==
Credits are taken from the Australian CD single liner notes.

Studio

- Recorded and mixed at Metrophonic Studios (Ripley, England)

Personnel

- Brian McFadden – writing, vocals
- Paul Barry – writing
- Mark Taylor – writing, production, mixing
- Delta Goodrem – vocals
- Adam Phillips – guitar
- Mark Smith – bass
- Ash Soon – drums
- Ren Swan – mixing, Pro Tools engineering
- Alex Smith – Metrophonic assistant

== Charts ==
=== Weekly charts ===
Chart (2005)	Peak position
Australia (ARIA)	1
Austria (Ö3 Austria Top 40)	34
Belgium (Ultratip Bubbling Under Flanders)	13
Belgium (Ultratip Bubbling Under Wallonia)	9
Denmark (Tracklisten)	2
Europe (European Hot 100 Singles)	12
Germany (GfK)	32
Ireland (IRMA)	1
Netherlands (Dutch Top 40 Tipparade)	8
Netherlands (Single Top 100)	62
Norway (VG-lista)	3
Scotland Singles (Official Charts)	2
Sweden (Sverigetopplistan)	29
Switzerland (Schweizer Hitparade)	36
UK Singles (Official Charts)	3
UK Airplay (Music Week)	5

=== Year-end charts ===
Chart (2005)	Position
Australia (ARIA)	14
Ireland (IRMA)	18
UK Singles (OCC)	67

== Certifications ==
Region	Certification	Certified units/sales
Australia (ARIA)	Platinum	70,000^{^}
^{^} Shipments figures based on certification alone.

== Release history ==
Region	Date	Format(s)	Label(s)	Ref.
United Kingdom	31 January 2005	CD; DVD	Sony Music UK; Modest!	
Denmark	21 February 2005	CD	Sony Music UK; Modest!	
Australia	7 March 2005	CD	Sony BMG; Daylight; Modest!	

== See also ==
- List of number-one singles of 2005 (Australia)
- List of number-one singles of 2005 (Ireland)
