= Real to Me (Brian McFadden song) =

2004 single by Brian McFadden

Single by Brian McFadden

from the album Irish Son
- B-side: "Oblivious"; "Uncomplicated"; "Walking Disaster"
- Released: 6 September 2004
- Length: 3:41
- Label: Sony Music UK
- Songwriters: Brian McFadden; Guy Chambers
- Producers: Guy Chambers; Richard Flack

Brian McFadden singles chronology
"Real to Me" (2004)	"Irish Son" (2004)

Music video
- "Real to Me" on YouTube

"Real to Me" is a song by Irish singer Brian McFadden, released as his debut solo single outside Westlife. It served as the lead single from his first solo album, Irish Son (2004). The song was written by McFadden and Guy Chambers and was produced by Chambers and Richard Flack. Released in September 2004, "Real to Me" was McFadden's first number-one single, peaking atop the charts of Denmark, Ireland, Norway, and the United Kingdom.

== Music video ==
The music video was directed by Nigel Dick. The video shows McFadden crossing paths with his past self who is seen arguing with his agent (Neil Burgess) before picking up a vase of flowers and throwing it at a wall and then notices McFadden watching, follows him to a large building and watches him and his band performing before leaving.

== Track listings ==
All song were written by Brian McFadden. Additional writers are credited in parentheses.

UK and European CD1

1. "Real to Me" (clean edit) (Guy Chambers) – 3:42
2. "Uncomplicated" (Chambers) – 3:42

UK and European CD2

1. "Real to Me" (album version) (Chambers)
2. "Oblivious" (Paul Barry)
3. "Walking Disaster" (Phil Thornalley)
4. "Real to Me" (video)

Australian CD single

1. "Real to Me" (album version) (Chambers) – 3:45
2. "Oblivious" (Barry) – 3:15
3. "Walking Disaster" (Thornalley) – 3:21

== Charts ==
=== Weekly charts ===
Chart (2004–2005)	Peak position
Australia (ARIA)	54
Austria (Ö3 Austria Top 40)	26
Belgium (Ultratip Bubbling Under Flanders)	5
Belgium (Ultratip Bubbling Under Wallonia)	17
Czech Republic (IFPI)	12
Denmark (Tracklisten)	1
Europe (Eurochart Hot 100)	5
Europe (European Hit Radio)	9
Finland (Suomen virallinen lista)	4
Germany (GfK)	33
Ireland (IRMA)	1
Italy (FIMI)	44
Netherlands (Dutch Top 40)	16
Netherlands (Single Top 100)	17
New Zealand (Recorded Music NZ)	16
Norway (VG-lista)	1
Scottish Singles Sales (Official Charts)	1
Sweden (Sverigetopplistan)	2
Switzerland (Schweizer Hitparade)	28
UK Singles (Official Charts)	1
UK Airplay (Music Week)	4

=== Year-end charts ===
Chart (2004)	Position
Ireland (IRMA)	12
Sweden (Hitlistan)	41
UK Singles (OCC)	47

== Release history ==
Region	Date	Format(s)	Label(s)	Catalogue	Ref.
United Kingdom	6 September 2004	CD	Sony Music UK	675303 1; 675303 2	
Australia	11 February 2005	CD	Sony Music UK; Epic	675303 8	
