= Brian McFadden =

Irish singer (born 1980)

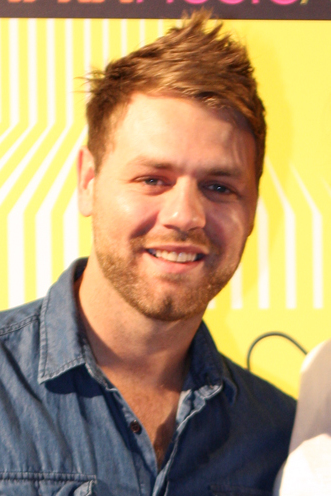
- McFadden in 2012
- Born: Brian Nicholas McFadden; 12 April 1980 (age 46); Dublin, Ireland
- Other name: Bryan McFadden
- Occupations: Singer; television presenter; songwriter
- Years active: 1998–present
- Spouse: Kerry Katona (m. 2002; div. 2006) Vogue Williams (m. 2012; div. 2017) Danielle Parkinson (m. 2025)
- Children: 3
- Relatives: Susan McFadden (sister)
- Musical career
- Genres: Pop; soft rock
- Instruments: Vocals
- Works: Brian McFadden discography
- Labels: Sony BMG; BMF; Universal
- Formerly of: Westlife
- Website: brianmcfadden.com

Brian Nicholas McFadden (born 12 April 1980) is an Irish pop singer and television presenter. He rose to fame in 1998 as a member of the Irish boy band Westlife. Following his departure from the group in 2004, McFadden released his debut solo album, Irish Son. He has since released four studio albums: Set in Stone (2008), Wall of Soundz (2010), The Irish Connection (2013), and Otis (2019). McFadden has also released two albums, Strings Attached (2020) and Old School (2022), in collaboration with Keith Duffy of Boyzone as part of Boyzlife.

== Early life ==
McFadden was born in Dublin and was raised Catholic. Throughout his younger years, he always had an interest in singing, dancing and football. Along with his sister Susan, McFadden attended the Billie Barry Stage School in Dublin, which led him to doing stage and TV roles, including a role in the Irish TV show Finbar's Class, a comedy revolving around a group of student-singers. In early 1998, he formed a pop-R&B group with his friends Tim and Darragh, called Cartel, and performed live gigs in Dublin pubs. When the band passed their credentials to prominent Irish music manager Louis Walsh, McFadden was asked to come to the audition for the formation of a new band that would later be called Westlife.

== Music career ==
=== 1998–2004: Westlife ===
In June 1998, McFadden auditioned for Irish boy band Westlife and was against another blonde Nicky Byrne and eventually both joined the group alongside Kian Egan, Mark Feehily, and Shane Filan. After joining, he changed the spelling of his name from Brian to Bryan to make it easier to sign autographs. With McFadden as part of the group, Westlife were under the music mogul Simon Cowell and released their first single, "Swear It Again", which was the group's first and only single to have charted in the US in 2000, four Irish No. 1 studio albums, and a No. 1 greatest hits album. They also released seventeen Irish top 5 singles including the hit single "Uptown Girl", which peaked within the top 10 in seven European countries and also in Australia and New Zealand. In March 2004, McFadden left the group to spend more time with his family and work on solo projects. He subsequently began a solo career and decided to revert the spelling of his first name back to its original, "Brian". Before launching his solo career, he co-wrote the song "If My World Stopped Turning", which was sung by Ireland's entry Chris Doran in the Eurovision Song Contest 2004.

=== 2004–2006: Going solo and Irish Son ===
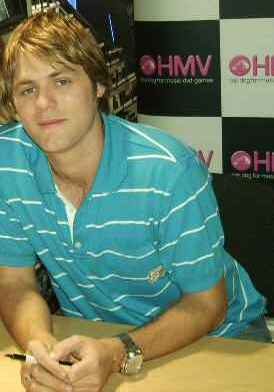
McFadden left Westlife for his family and later released his solo music.

Following his departure from Westlife, McFadden signed to major record label, Sony BMG. In September 2004, he released his debut solo single "Real to Me", which became his first solo No. 1 single in Britain, Ireland, Denmark and Norway. His second single and title track, "Irish Son", peaked within the top 10 on the British and Ireland Singles Charts. Following the release of the two singles, McFadden released his debut solo album, Irish Son, in November 2004 and it peaked within the top 10 on the Irish Albums Chart. McFadden co-wrote most of the songs on the album with Guy Chambers, best known for his successful collaboration with Robbie Williams and INXS. The third single "Almost Here", a duet with Australian singer Delta Goodrem became McFadden's second No. 1 single in Ireland as a solo artist and his first in Australia and gained a platinum accreditation there. The fourth and final single, "Demons" peaked within the top 30 on the charts in Ireland and Britain. McFadden continued writing songs for artists such as Il Divo and Girls Aloud, as well as co-writing the theme song "Together We Are One" for the 2006 Commonwealth Games. That same year, McFadden collaborated with American singer LeAnn Rimes on the song, "Everybody's Someone".

=== 2007–2010: Label change, Set in Stone and Wall of Soundz ===
While working on the second album, McFadden's record label, Sony BMG insisted that he work with an artists & repertoire (A&R) man, after disappointing sales of his last album, which only sold 800,000 copies worldwide. However, there were claims that McFadden's A&R man did not want McFadden to work with Guy Chambers, who had previously worked with McFadden on his last album and fought about his songs and musical direction. His A&R man wanted him to make songs like James Morrison, Paolo Nutini, and the Scissor Sisters but McFadden insisted he make songs that are of his style. It was later revealed in March 2007 that McFadden parted ways with Sony BMG. Later that year, he set up his own record label under the name of BMF Records and released his new single "Like Only a Woman Can" in Ireland, through the label. "Like Only a Woman Can" became his third Irish No. 1 single as a solo artist. In early 2008, McFadden signed to Universal Music Australia and released the single there in April 2008, which peaked within the ARIA top 15. Following the release of "Like Only a Woman Can", McFadden released his second studio album, Set in Stone. The album peaked in Australia at No. 5 on the ARIA Albums Chart. Other singles were released from the album: "Twisted", which peaked within the top 30 on the ARIA Singles Chart and "Everything But You", which failed to chart the ARIA top 50.

In April 2010, McFadden released "Just Say So", which features American rapper Kevin Rudolf. The single debuted on the ARIA Singles Chart at No. 1 and stayed there for three weeks. It spent seven weeks in the ARIA top ten and thirteen weeks in the ARIA top 50 and gained a platinum accreditation. Following the release of "Just Say So", McFadden released his third studio album, Wall of Soundz, in Australia on 23 April 2010. The album was originally going to be released as a side-project McFadden embarked on with American songwriter Rob Conley but both decided to release it as McFadden's third solo album. It debuted at No. 27 on the ARIA Albums Chart and spent only three weeks in the ARIA top 50. "Chemical Rush" was the second single released from the album in June 2010 and peaked at No. 12 on the charts. In September 2010, McFadden released the third single entitled "Mistakes", a duet with his then fiancée Delta Goodrem. McFadden also recorded a duet with Ronan Keating on Keating's duet album, a cover of the Bee Gees' "To Love Somebody".

=== 2011–2015: "Just the Way You Are" and The Irish Connection ===
On 25 February 2011, McFadden released the new single "Just the Way You Are (Drunk at the Bar)". The song was criticised by some as a glorification of date rape, as a result of which he cancelled the shooting of a proposed pop video for the song, asked that the song not be played on the radio and pledged via his Twitter account to donate all proceeds from the song to rape victims. "Just the Way You Are (Drunk at the Bar)" debuted on the ARIA Singles Chart at number sixty-one on 8 March 2011, and peaked at number forty-nine the next week.

In June 2011, McFadden appeared on Australian radio show The Kyle & Jackie O Show to launch both of his new singles "Come Party" and "That's How Life Goes", which was co-written by singer, songwriter and producer Ray Ruffin. Despite heavy promotion and appearances on TV shows such as Dancing with the Stars, the new singles failed to impact the charts at all, which was surprising considering his high-profile appearances on Australia's Got Talent. Some of this has been attributed to the negative press surrounding his previous single "Just the Way You Are (Drunk at the Bar)". This, as well as his much-publicized split with Delta Goodrem, appeared to have had a negative impact on his music career.

McFadden released his new single "Wrap My Arms" on 20 January 2012 in Australia. The song was used in a promo for Home and Away and it managed to peak at No. 70 on the ARIA top 100.

On 13 September 2012, McFadden announced the release of his fourth studio album, The Irish Connection, featuring covers of his favourite Irish songs as well as duets with Ronan Keating and Sinéad O'Connor. The album was recorded in both Sydney and Dublin and features none of McFadden's past five single releases, which have not appeared in an album format to date.

On 18 September 2012, Ronan Keating announced that McFadden would be joining him on his 2013 UK Fires Tour.

=== 2016–present: Boyzlife ===
Boyzlife is a duo consisting of McFadden and Boyzone's Keith Duffy, formed by the pair in 2016. In 2020, they released their debut album, Strings Attached.

In February 2020, Duffy invited John Junior, a mental health activist, on stage with McFadden on their Boyzlife tour to share his mental health journey with their fans. Junior travels around the United Kingdom with Charlie the Duck, who accompanies him, encouraging people to speak up about mental health. Duffy is friends with Junior and supports his campaign to raise awareness for mental health.

On 19 January 2022, the duo announced the release of their second studio album, Old School. The album debuted and peaked at number 42 on the UK Albums Chart in May 2022.

On 13 January 2025, Boyzlife released the single "Dancing with the Echoes". The single peaked at number 94 on the UK Singles Downloads Chart. In March 2025, they announced a UK tour for spring 2026. On 24 October 2025, they released the single "Lovebirds", which peaked at number 76 on the UK Singles Downloads Chart. In December 2025, they announced a UK tour for autumn 2026.

== Television and radio career ==
In 2008, McFadden took on the role of television presenter as co-host of FOX8's Football Superstar in Australia. He reprised his role for the second season in 2009. In August 2009, McFadden appeared as a guest judge on Australian Idol.

In 2010, McFadden became one of the new judges on Australia's Got Talent replacing Red Symons alongside Kyle Sandilands who replaced Tom Burlinson and Dannii Minogue. He was a judge for three years, but was not asked back for the seventh season. In season 6, McFadden had a controversial dismissal of Owen Campbell, after a small argument where it appeared that McFadden did not understand the outlaw style genre of the contestant and persona he was portraying which may have played a part in his ratings drop which led to him leaving the show.

In late 2008, McFadden teamed up with singer Ricki-Lee Coulter and former Big Brother host Mike Goldman to present the Summer Breakfast Show on 2Day FM. In September 2009, McFadden returned to radio by co-hosting on the breakfast show on 2dayFM with Jackie O and Andrew G, replacing host Kyle Sandilands for a short period of time.

2013 saw McFadden and his wife at the time Vogue Williams come in second place on ITV dancing show Stepping Out, hosted by Davina McCall.

In 2014, McFadden co-hosted the Channel 5 dating game show Stand By Your Man alongside former Freshly Squeezed co-host Laura Jackson.

In September 2014, McFadden began hosting daytime ITV series Who's Doing the Dishes? The show returned for a second series in September 2015 and a third in September 2016 making over 90 episodes in total. In January 2015, McFadden took part in celebrity talent show Get Your Act Together. In December 2015, McFadden and Vogue Williams took part in a celebrity couples edition of Catchphrase.

In 2016, McFadden participated in the third series of The Jump on Channel 4. He was the fourth celebrity to be eliminated from the show.

In 2019, McFadden took part in the eleventh series of Dancing on Ice, alongside professional partner Alex Murphy. He finished in fourth place, after a skate-off with Saara Aalto.

In 2025, McFadden danced with Michelle Tsiakkas for the 2025 Strictly Come Dancing Christmas Special.

== Filmography ==
Television

- Australia's Got Talent (2010–2012) – Judge
- Football Superstar (2008) – Presenter
- Summer Breakfast Show (2008) – Co-presenter
- Australian Idol (2009) – Guest judge
- Stepping Out (2013) – Contestant
- Stand By Your Man (2014) – Co-presenter
- Who's Doing the Dishes? (2014–2016) – Presenter
- Get Your Act Together (2015) – Contestant
- The Jump (2016) – Contestant
- Dancing on Ice (2019) – Contestant

Guest appearances

- The Chase: Celebrity Special (27 September 2014) – Contestant
- Catchphrase: Celebrity Couples Special (5 December 2015) – Contestant
- The Chase: Text Santa Special (18 December 2015) – Contestant

== Personal life ==
McFadden married Atomic Kitten singer Kerry Katona on 5 January 2002 in Rathfeigh, County Meath, Ireland. They have two daughters. They divorced in 2006. In 2004, McFadden began dating Australian singer Delta Goodrem, with whom he collaborated on the duet "Almost Here". They were engaged but the pair ended their relationship in 2011. He married Irish model Vogue Williams in 2012 in Florence, Italy. They separated in 2015 and divorced in 2017.

In 2018, McFadden received a £450 fine and was banned from driving for six months at a Nottingham court after accruing 12 penalty points for four separate speeding offences.

In December 2019, McFadden announced his engagement to physical education teacher Danielle Parkinson on Twitter after three years of dating. The couple revealed in November 2020 that they were expecting their first child together. Their daughter was born on 16 May 2021. McFadden and Parkinson were married on 5 July 2025 in a small ceremony in Newquay, Cornwall.

== Discography ==
=== Solo ===
- Irish Son (2004)
- Set in Stone (2008)
- Wall of Soundz (2010)
- The Irish Connection (2013)
- Otis (2019)

=== Boyzlife ===
- Strings Attached (2020)
- Old School (2022)

== Awards and nominations ==
=== APRA Awards ===
The APRA Awards are presented annually from 1982 by the Australasian Performing Right Association (APRA), "honouring composers and songwriters". They commenced in 1982.

| Year | Nominee / work | Award | Result | Ref. |
|---|---|---|---|---|
| 2011 | "Chemical Rush" (Brian McFadden, Antonio Egizii, David Musumeci, James Maas) | Dance Work of the Year | Nominated | |

=== ARIA Music Awards ===
The ARIA Music Awards are a set of annual ceremonies presented by Australian Recording Industry Association (ARIA), which recognise excellence, innovation, and achievement across all genres of the music of Australia. They commenced in 1987.

| Year | Nominee / work | Award | Result | Ref. |
|---|---|---|---|---|
| 2010 | "Just Say So" | Most Popular Australian Single | Nominated | |
| 2010 | Brian McFadden | Most Popular Australian Artist | Nominated | |
