= Delta Goodrem discography =

Recordings by Australian singer

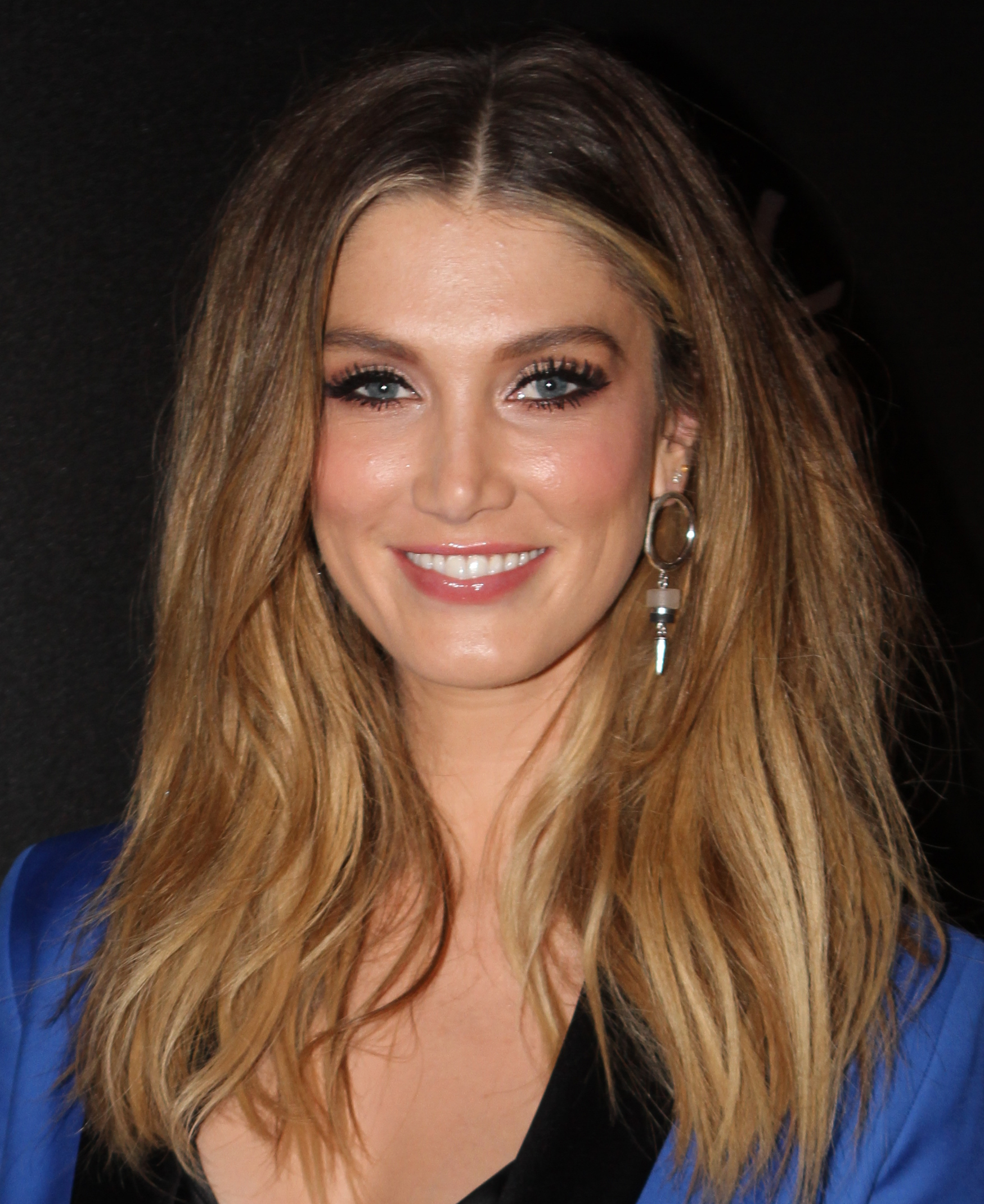
- Goodrem in 2017
- Studio albums: 8
- Extended plays: 1
- Soundtrack albums: 1
- Compilation albums: 1
- Singles: 45
- Promotional singles: 4
- Video albums: 4
- Music videos: 49

Australian singer, songwriter and actress Delta Goodrem has released 7 studio albums, 1 re-recorded album, 1 soundtrack album, 1 compilation album, 1 extended play (EP), 45 singles (including 4 as a featured artist), 3 promotional singles, 4 video albums, and 49 music videos. Goodrem signed a recording contract with Sony Music Entertainment in 1999 and, since then, has achieved five number one albums and nine number one songs in Australia.

Goodrem debuted in 2001 with a teen pop single titled "I Don't Care" that was not commercially successful. Her 2003 debut album Innocent Eyes revamped her musical style as piano-based ballad pop, and was a multi-platinum seller in Australia, New Zealand and the United Kingdom. Her successful singles were "Born to Try", "Lost Without You", "Innocent Eyes", "Not Me, Not I" and "Predictable". The album sold 1.2 million copies in Australia, and over 4 million worldwide.

Its successor, Mistaken Identity, was created during Goodrem's battle with Hodgkin's lymphoma, a form of cancer. While the album was unable to parallel the commercial success of Innocent Eyes, it did enter the ARIA charts at number one, and gained multi-platinum status. It featured successful top-ten singles "Out of the Blue", "Mistaken Identity" and "Almost Here". Goodrem's third album Delta was released in October 2007. The album debuted at number one in Australia, making it her third consecutive chart-topping album there. It also achieved multi-platinum status in Australia. The singles included "In This Life" and "Believe Again", both of which achieved platinum status in Australia.

Her fourth album Child of the Universe was released in 2012. It spawned two hit singles, "Wish You Were Here" and "Sitting on Top of the World", which were both certified platinum in Australia, the latter eventually being certified triple platinum. Standalone single "Heart Hypnotic" went gold. With the release of her fifth studio album, Wings of the Wild, which featured the multi-platinum single "Wings" and the gold single "Dear Life", Goodrem earned her fourth number-one album. She released a loose single in 2018 called "Think About You", which is certified gold. Her fifth number-one album came in 2021 with Bridge over Troubled Dreams, featuring Goodrem's most recent top-forty single, "Paralyzed". Goodrem has sold eight million records worldwide.

== Albums ==
=== Studio albums ===
List of albums, with selected details, chart positions and certifications
| Title | Details | Peak chart positions | | | | | | | | | | Certifications |
| Title | Details | AUS | AUT | GER | IRL | JPN | NLD | NZ | SWI | UK | US | Certifications |
|---|---|---|---|---|---|---|---|---|---|---|---|---|
| Innocent Eyes | Released: 24 March 2003; Label: Epic; Formats: CD, vinyl, cassette, digital download | 1 | 27 | 20 | 3 | — | 39 | 6 | 14 | 2 | — | ARIA: 15× Platinum; BPI: 3× Platinum; BVMI: Gold; RMNZ: 3× Platinum |
| Mistaken Identity | Released: 8 November 2004; Label: Daylight, Sony BMG; Formats: CD, cassette, digital download | 1 | 62 | 59 | 39 | — | — | 7 | 50 | 25 | — | ARIA: 5× Platinum; BPI: Gold; RMNZ: Platinum |
| Delta | Released: 20 October 2007; Label: Sony BMG; Formats: CD, digital download | 1 | — | — | — | 39 | — | 12 | — | — | 116 | ARIA: 3× Platinum; RMNZ: Gold |
| Child of the Universe | Released: 26 October 2012; Label: Sony Music; Formats: CD, digital download | 2 | — | — | — | — | — | 18 | — | — | — | ARIA: Gold |
| Wings of the Wild | Released: 1 July 2016; Label: Sony Music; Formats: CD, digital download, streaming | 1 | — | — | — | — | — | 8 | — | 129 | — | ARIA: Gold |
| Only Santa Knows | Released: 13 November 2020; Label: Sony Music; Formats: CD, vinyl, digital download, streaming | 2 | — | — | — | — | — | — | — | — | — | |
| Bridge over Troubled Dreams | Released: 14 May 2021; Label: Sony Music; Formats: CD, vinyl, cassette, digital download, streaming | 1 | — | — | — | — | — | — | — | — (Note: "Bridge over Troubled Dreams" did not enter the UK Albums Chart, but peaked at number 22 on the UK Album Downloads Chart Top 100.) | — | |
| Pure | Scheduled: 5 February 2027; Label: ATLED, Better Now | To be released | | | | | | | | | | |
"—" denotes a recording that did not chart or was not released in that territory.

=== Re-recorded albums ===
List of re-recorded albums, with selected chart positions
| Title | Details | Peak chart positions |
| Title | Details | AUS |
|---|---|---|
| Innocent Eyes: Ten Year Anniversary Acoustic Edition | Released: 29 November 2013; Label: Sony Music; Format: CD, digital download, streaming | 22 |

=== Soundtrack albums ===
List of soundtrack albums, with selected chart positions
| Title | Details | Peak chart positions |
| Title | Details | AUS |
|---|---|---|
| I Honestly Love You | Released: 11 May 2018; Label: Sony Music Australia; Format: CD, vinyl, digital download | 4 |

=== Compilation albums ===
List of compilation albums, with selected chart positions
| Title | Details | Peak chart positions |
| Title | Details | JPN |
|---|---|---|
| Innocent Eyes | Released: 11 October 2006; Label: Sony Music Japan; Format: CD, digital download | 19 |

== Extended plays ==
List of extended plays, with selected chart positions
| Title | Details | Peak chart positions |
| Title | Details | AUS |
|---|---|---|
| Christmas | Released: 14 December 2012; Label: Sony Music; Format: CD, digital download, streaming | 67 |
| Delta Goodrem – Live with the BBC Orchestra | Released: 6 September 2024; Label: ATLED Records; Format: Digital download, streaming | — |
"—" denotes a recording that did not chart or was not released in that territory.

== Singles ==
=== As lead artist ===
==== 2000s ====
List of singles as lead artist in the 2000s, with selected chart positions and certifications, showing year released and originating album
| Title | Year | Peak chart positions | | | | | | | | | Certifications | Album |
| Title | Year | AUS | AUT | GER | IRE | NL | NZ | SWE | SWI | UK | Certifications | Album |
|---|---|---|---|---|---|---|---|---|---|---|---|---|
| "I Don't Care" | 2001 | 64 | — | — | — | — | — | — | — | — | | Non-album single |
| "Born to Try" | 2002 | 1 | — | 61 | 13 | 18 | 1 | — | 58 | 3 | ARIA: 4× Platinum; BPI: Silver; RMNZ: Gold | Innocent Eyes |
| "Lost Without You" | 2003 | 1 | 14 | 27 | 15 | 46 | 4 | 9 | 47 | 4 | ARIA: 2× Platinum | Innocent Eyes |
| "Innocent Eyes" | 2003 | 1 | — | — | 25 | — | 14 | — | — | 9 | ARIA: Platinum | Innocent Eyes |
| "Not Me, Not I" | 2003 | 1 | — | — | 25 | 49 | 11 | — | — | 18 | ARIA: Platinum | Innocent Eyes |
| "Predictable" | 2003 | 1 | — | — | — | — | — | — | — | — | ARIA: 2× Platinum | Innocent Eyes |
| "Out of the Blue" | 2004 | 1 | 46 | 54 | 15 | — | 14 | — | 60 | 9 | ARIA: Platinum | Mistaken Identity |
| "Mistaken Identity" | 2005 | 7 | — | — | — | — | — | — | — | — | ARIA: Gold | Mistaken Identity |
| "Almost Here" (with Brian McFadden) | 2005 | 1 | 34 | 32 | 1 | 62 | — | 29 | 36 | 3 | ARIA: Platinum | Mistaken Identity |
| "A Little Too Late" | 2005 | 13 | — | — | — | — | — | — | — | — | | Mistaken Identity |
| "Be Strong" (Note: Only released as a digital download and limited promo CD. At the time of release, digital downloads were not included as part of the main singles chart, therefore it was ineligible to chart.) | 2005 | — | — | — | — | — | — | — | — | — | | Mistaken Identity |
| "Together We Are One" | 2006 | 2 | — | — | — | — | — | — | — | — | ARIA: Gold | Commonwealth Games |
| "Flawed" (Note: Only released in Japan. Reached number 1 on the Japanese Download Chart.) | 2006 | — | — | — | — | — | — | — | — | — | | Innocent Eyes (2006 album) |
| "In This Life" | 2007 | 1 | — | — | — | — | 31 | — | — | — | ARIA: 2× Platinum | Delta |
| "Believe Again" | 2007 | 2 | — | — | — | — | — | — | — | — | ARIA: Platinum | Delta |
| "You Will Only Break My Heart" | 2008 | 14 | — | — | — | — | — | — | — | — | | Delta |
| "I Can't Break It to My Heart" | 2008 | 13 | — | — | — | — | — | — | — | — | | Delta |
"—" denotes a recording that did not chart or was not released in that territory.

==== 2010s ====
List of singles as lead artist in the 2010s, with selected chart positions and certifications, showing year released and originating album
| Title | Year | Peak chart positions | | Certifications | Album |
| Title | Year | AUS | NZ | Certifications | Album |
|---|---|---|---|---|---|
| "Sitting on Top of the World" | 2012 | 2 | 23 | ARIA: 3× Platinum | Child of the Universe |
| "Dancing with a Broken Heart" | 2012 | 15 | — | ARIA: Gold | Child of the Universe |
| "Wish You Were Here" | 2012 | 5 | — | ARIA: Platinum | Child of the Universe |
| "Bayini" (with Gurrumul Yunupingu) | 2013 | 4 | — | | Non-album singles |
| "Heart Hypnotic" | 2013 | 7 | — | ARIA: Gold | Non-album singles |
| "Love Thy Will Be Done" | 2014 | 59 | — | | Non-album singles |
| "Only Human" | 2015 | 46 | — | | Wings of the Wild |
| "Wings" | 2015 | 1 | 39 | ARIA: 2× Platinum | Wings of the Wild |
| "Dear Life" | 2016 | 3 | — | ARIA: Gold | Wings of the Wild |
| "Enough" (featuring Gizzle) | 2016 | 27 | — — (Note: "Enough" did not enter the NZ Top 40 Singles Chart, but peaked at number 7 on the NZ Heatseekers Singles Chart.) | | Wings of the Wild |
| "The River" | 2016 | 58 | — | | Wings of the Wild |
| "Think About You" | 2018 | 19 | — (Note: "Think About You" did not enter the NZ Top 40 Singles Chart, but peaked at number four on the NZ Heatseeker Singles Chart.) | ARIA: Gold | Non-album singles |
| "Welcome to Earth" | 2018 | — | — | | Non-album singles |
"—" denotes a recording that did not chart or was not released in that territory.

==== 2020s ====
List of singles as lead artist in the 2020s, with selected chart positions and certifications, showing year released and originating album
| Title | Year | Peak chart positions | | | | | | Album |
| Title | Year | AUS | AUS Indie | AUT | SWE | SWI | UK Digital | Album |
|---|---|---|---|---|---|---|---|---|
| "Let It Rain" | 2020 | 90 | —N/a (Note: Goodrem released these songs via Sony Music Australia, and hence, not independent and not eligible for this chart.) | — | — | — | 51 | Artists Unite for Fire Fight (Note: The studio single version of "Let It Rain" does not appear on any album releases, but a live version was featured on the Fire Fight compilation.) |
| "Keep Climbing" | 2020 | — (Note: "Keep Climbing" did not enter the ARIA top 50, but peaked at number 6 on the Billboard Australian Digital Song Sales chart.) | —N/a | — | — | — | — | Bridge over Troubled Dreams |
| "Paralyzed" | 2020 | 36 | —N/a | — | — | — | 87 | Bridge over Troubled Dreams |
| "Solid Gold" | 2020 | — | —N/a | — | — | — | — | Bridge over Troubled Dreams |
| "Billionaire" | 2021 | — | —N/a | — | — | — | — | Bridge over Troubled Dreams |
| "All of My Friends" | 2021 | — | —N/a | — | — | — | — | Bridge over Troubled Dreams |
| "Back to Your Heart" | 2023 | — | 1 | — | — | — | 25 | Non-album single |
| "No More Tears (Enough Is Enough)" (with Claire Richards) | 2023 | — | —N/a | — | — | — | 46 | Euphoria |
| "Hearts on the Run" | 2024 | — | 1 | — | — | — | 31 | Non-album single |
| "Eclipse" | 2026 | 13 | 1 | 28 | 70 | 70 | 4 | Pure |
| "Hologram" | 2026 | — | 3 | — | — | — | — | Pure |
| "Warrior" | 2026 | — | — | — | — | — | 47 | Pure |
| "Telescope" | 2026 | — | — | — | — | — | 64 | Pure |
"—" denotes a recording that did not chart or was not released in that territory.

=== Featured singles ===
List of singles as featured artist, with selected chart positions and certifications, showing year released and originating album
| Title | Year | Peak chart positions | | Album |
| Title | Year | AUS | US AC | Album |
|---|---|---|---|---|
| "Mistakes" (with Brian McFadden) | 2010 | 41 | — | Wall of Soundz |
| "I'm Not Ready (with Michael Bolton) | 2011 | — | 29 | Gems: The Duets Collection |
| "Vente Pa' Ca" (with Ricky Martin) | 2016 | — | — | Non-album singles |
| "With a Little Help from My Friends" (with Sony Music All Stars) | 2017 | — | — | Non-album singles |
"—" denotes a recording that did not chart or was not released in that territory.

=== Promotional singles ===
List of promotional singles as lead artist, showing year released and originating album
| Title | Year | Notes |
|---|---|---|
| "Throw It Away" | 2004 | Innocent Eyes (UK promo) |
| "The Score" | 2017 | 2017 NRL Theme Song |
| "Back in 84" | 2020 | B-side to "Paralyzed" |

== Other charted songs ==
| Title | Year | Peak chart positions | | Album |
| Title | Year | NZ Hot | SWE | Album |
|---|---|---|---|---|
| "All Out of Love" (Westlife featuring Delta Goodrem) | 2006 | — | 31 | The Love Album |
| "Only Santa Knows" | 2020 | 36 | — | Only Santa Knows |

== Videography ==
=== Video albums ===
List of video albums
| Title | Details | Peak chart positions | | Certifications |
| Title | Details | AUS | NZ | Certifications |
|---|---|---|---|---|
| Delta | Released: 13 October 2003; Label: Sony Music; Formats: DVD, VHS | 1 | 1 | AUS: 12× Platinum |
| The Visualise Tour: Live in Concert | Released: 13 November 2005; Label: Sony BMG; Formats: DVD | 1 | — | AUS: 4× Platinum |
| Believe Again: Australian Tour 2009 | Released: 18 September 2009; Label: Sony Music; Formats: DVD, CD | 1 | — | AUS: Gold |
| Wings of the Wild Live | Released: 2 November 2018; Label: Sony Music; Formats: DVD, Blu-ray | 1 | — | |
"—" denotes a recording that did not chart or was not released in that territory.

=== Music videos ===
List of music videos
| Title | Year | Director |
|---|---|---|
| "I Don't Care" | 2001 | Anthony Rose |
| "A Year Ago Today" (Note: The original 2001 version of the song is very different from the one which appears on Innocent Eyes in 2003, sounding similar to Delta's early teen pop sound.) | 2001 | Fabrizio Lipan |
| "Born to Try" | 2002 | Miikka Lommi |
| "Lost Without You" | 2003 | Katie Bell |
| "Innocent Eyes" | 2003 | Michael Gracey |
| "Not Me, Not I" | 2003 | Michael Spiccia |
| "Predictable" (live) | 2003 | |
| "Out of the Blue" | 2004 | Nigel Dick |
| "Mistaken Identity" | 2005 | Michael Spiccia |
| "Almost Here" | 2005 | Martin Weisz |
| "A Little Too Late" | 2005 | Anthony Rose |
| "Lost Without You" (US version) | 2005 | |
| "Be Strong" | 2005 | |
| "The Analyst" | 2005 | Ash Lyons |
| "Together We Are One" | 2006 | |
| "Flawed" | 2006 | |
| "In This Life" | 2007 | Rocky Schenck |
| "Believe Again" | 2007 | Michael Spiccia |
| "You Will Only Break My Heart" | 2008 | |
| "In This Life" (US version) | 2008 | Robert Hales |
| "I Can't Break It to My Heart" | 2008 | |
| "Mistakes" (with Brian McFadden) | 2010 | Dan Reisinger |
| "Sitting on Top of the World" | 2012 | Guy Franklin |
| "Dancing with a Broken Heart" | 2012 | Hannah Lux Davis |
| "Wish You Were Here" | 2012 | Ryan Pallotta |
| "Only Human" | 2015 | |
| "You and You Alone" | 2015 | |
| "Wings" | 2015 | Anthony Rose |
| "Let it Snow, Let it Snow, Let it Snow" (with Human Nature) | 2015 | |
| "Dear Life" | 2016 | Anthony Rose |
| "Enough" (featuring Gizzle) | 2016 | Matt Sharp |
| "The River" | 2016 | Nick Waterman |
| "Heavy" | 2016 | Matt Sharp |
| "The Score" | 2017 | |
| "Think About You" | 2018 | Jared Daperis |
| "Paralyzed" | 2020 | Nick Waterman |
| "Billionaire" | 2021 | |
| "Only Santa Knows" | 2021 | |
| "White Christmas" | 2021 | |
| "River" | 2021 | |
| "Jingle Bell Rock" | 2021 | |
| "The Little Drummer Boy" | 2021 | |
| "Rockin' Around the Christmas Tree" | 2021 | |
| "Back to Your Heart" | 2023 | Marla Altschuler |
| "No More Tears (Enough Is Enough)" (with Claire Richards) | 2023 | John Taylor |
| "Hearts on the Run" | 2024 | Ashleigh Larden |
| "Eclipse" | 2026 | Liam Pethick |
| "Eclipse" (Steve Anderson remix) | 2026 | Mischief & Wonder |
| "Hologram" | 2026 | Liam Pethick |

== Other contributions ==
| Song | Year | Album | Notes |
|---|---|---|---|
| "Love" | 1999 | Australian Music Week 1999 | |
| "Do You Hear What I Hear?" | 2002 | The Spirit of Christmas 2002 | |
| "Have Yourself a Merry Little Christmas" | 2003 | The Spirit of Christmas 2003 | Also appeared on UK edition of Not Me, Not I |
| "Four Short Words" | 2004 | —N/a | Pepsi promotional download |
| "Phenomenal Woman" (with Olivia Newton-John) | 2005 | Stronger Than Before | |
| "Steppin' Out with My Baby" (with Tony Bennett) | 2006 | Duets: An American Classic | Australian edition only |
| "All Out of Love" (with Westlife) | 2006 | The Love Album | |
| "O Come All Ye Faithful" | 2006 | The Spirit of Christmas 2006 | |
| "Eyes on Me" (with Céline Dion) | 2007 | Taking Chances | Backing vocals |
| "Forgive Me Twice" (with Brian McFadden) | 2008 | Set in Stone | Backing vocals |
| "Right Here with You" (with Olivia Newton-John) | 2008 | A Celebration in Song | |
| "Live! Together (Tokyo Girls Anthem)" (with Juju) | 2008 | My Life | Also appeared on Japanese edition of Delta |
| "For Good" (with LeAnn Rimes) | 2008 | Wicked: Fifth Anniversary Special Edition | |
| "Little Drummer Boy" | 2010 | The Spirit of Christmas 2010 | |
| "Breathe, Dream, Pray, Love" (with Mark Masri and Jim Brickman) | 2010 | Home | |
| "Blue Christmas" | 2012 | The Spirit of Christmas 2012 | Also appeared on Christmas EP |
| "Ain't No Mountain High Enough" (with Michael Bolton) | 2013 | Ain't No Mountain High Enough: A Tribute to Hitsville U.S.A. | Australian edition only |
| "Silent Night" (with Gurrumul) | 2014 | The Spirit of Christmas 2014 | Also appeared on Only Santa Knows |
| "Let It Snow, Let It Snow, Let It Snow" (with Human Nature) | 2015 | The Christmas Album: Deluxe Edition | |
| "Let It Rain" (live) | 2020 | Artists Unite for Fire Fight | |
| "Together We Are One" (live) | 2020 | One World: Together at Home | |
| "Down Under" (live with Colin Hay) | 2020 | Music from the Home Front | |
| "Buses and Trains" (with Bachelor Girl) | 2026 | Waiting for the Day: Artist Sessions | |

== Writing credits ==
| Song | Year | Co-writers | Artist | Album |
|---|---|---|---|---|
| "Let's Dance" | 2004 | Mark Holden, Axel Breitung | Nikki Webster | Let's Dance |
| "Eyes on Me" | 2007 | Kristian Lundin, Savan Kotecha | Celine Dion | Taking Chances |
| "Days Go By" | 2008 | Matthew Gerrard, Bridget Benenate | Glenn Lyse | Come Closer |
| "Forgive Me Twice" | 2008 | Tommy Lee James, Stuart Crichton, Brian McFadden | Brian McFadden | Set in Stone |
| "Houston" | 2009 | Snob Scrilla | Snob Scrilla | Day One |
| "Break It to My Heart" | 2011 | Kristian Lundin, Savan Kotecha | Katherine Jenkins | Daydream |
| "As I Am" | 2015 | Arnthor Birgisson, Negin Djafari | Roshana | Single |
| "My Girls" | 2015 | Mitch Allen, Vince Pizzinga | Bella Paige | Junior Eurovision Song Contest 2015 |
| "Dancing with a Broken Heart" | 2017 | Vince Pizzinga, John Shanks | Steps | Tears on the Dancefloor: Crying at the Disco |
