= List of Delta Goodrem live performances =

Delta Goodrem live performances
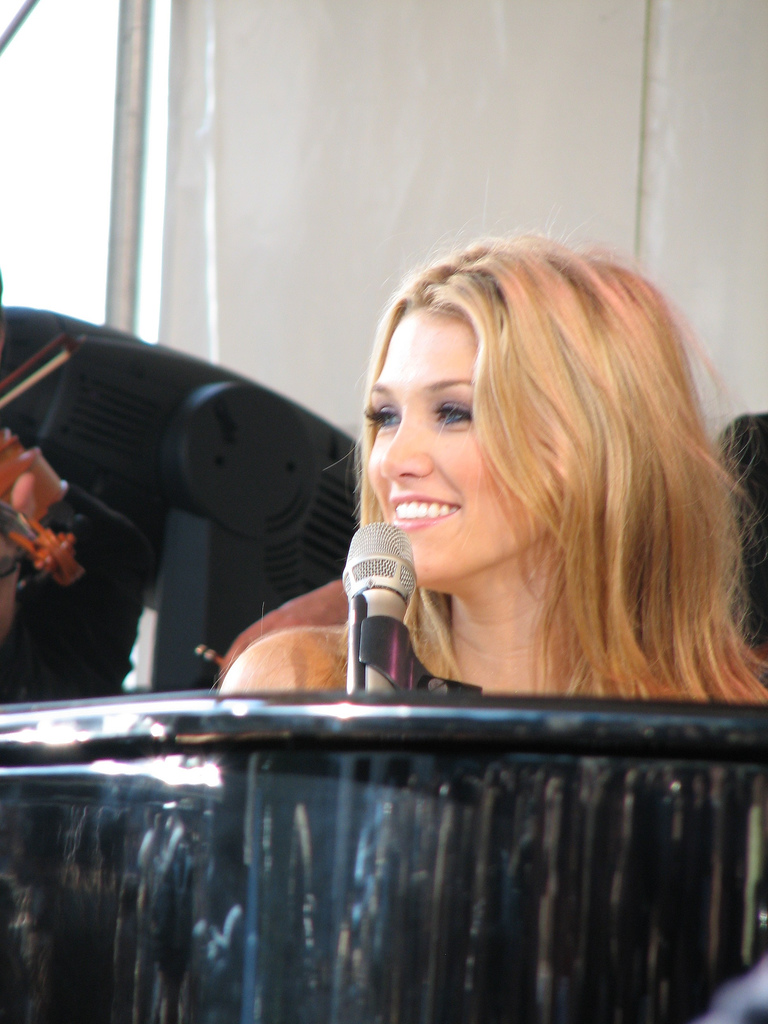
- Goodrem performing at Federation Square in Melbourne, Australia, 2007.
- Concert tours: 8

Australian singer-songwriter Delta Goodrem has headlined eight concert tours, supported several international artists, and performed at numerous major events, festivals and award shows since the release of her breakthrough single "Born to Try" in 2002. During the initial success of her debut album Innocent Eyes (2003), Goodrem was unable to tour due to her cancer diagnosis in July 2003. Following a period of recovery and the release of her second studio album Mistaken Identity (2004), Goodrem embarked on her debut concert tour The Visualise Tour in July 2005, playing to 80,000 people.

In 2006, Goodrem performed a new song, "Together We Are One", at the Commonwealth Games opening ceremony and years later, would perform again at the 2018 ceremony with the song "Welcome to Earth". In 2009 she embarked on the Believe Again Tour and supported Andrea Bocelli in North America during his My Christmas shows. She would support Bocelli again in 2010, 2014 and 2022. To launch her fourth studio album Child of the Universe (2012) Goodrem performed the mini-tour An Evening with Delta: The Top of My World Shows and the following year headlined the 2013 Sydney Gay and Lesbian Mardi Gras.

In 2015 and 2016, she starred as Grizabella in an Australian production of Cats, her first foray into musical theatre, and toured her fifth studio album Wings of the Wild (2016). In 2020 during the COVID-19 pandemic, Goodrem started a livestream concert series, titled The Bunkerdown Sessions, to unite fans during Australia's COVID-19 lockdowns. She toured her fifth studio album Bridge over Troubled Dreams (2021) in 2002 after restrictions were lifted, and joined the Backstreet Boys on 35 dates of their DNA World Tour in North America. In 2023, she embarked on the Hearts on the Run Tour – her first headlining tour of Europe – and celebrated the 20 year anniversary of Innocent Eyes in Australia with a sold out retrospective tour. In 2025, she performed four nights of celebrations for Mistaken Identity, for its twentieth anniversary. Since 2020, Goodrem has hosted and performed an annual Christmas concert, Christmas with Delta, televised on the Nine Network.

== Concert tours ==
=== Headlining ===
List of concert tours headlined by Delta Goodrem, showing dates, associated album(s), continents and number of shows
| Title | Dates | Associated album(s) | Continent(s) | Shows | Ref. |
|---|---|---|---|---|---|
| The Visualise Tour | 3 July 2005 – 27 July 2005 | Innocent Eyes; Mistaken Identity | Oceania | 10 | |
| Believe Again Tour | 9 January 2009 – 4 February 2009 | Delta | Oceania | 14 | |
| An Evening with Delta: The Top of My World Shows | 27 October 2012 – 8 November 2012 | Child of the Universe | Oceania | 5 | |
| Wings of the Wild Tour | 27 October 2016 – 11 November 2016 | Wings of the Wild | Oceania | 7 | |
| Bridge over Troubled Dreams Tour | 12 March 2022 – 19 October 2022 | Bridge over Troubled Dreams | Oceania; Europe | 13 | |
| Hearts On the Run Tour | 22 August 2023 – 15 September 2023 | — | Europe | 14 | |
| Innocent Eyes 20th Anniversary Tour | 23 September 2023 – 7 October 2023 | Innocent Eyes | Oceania | 9 | |
| Mistaken Identity: A Night of Celebration | 14 April 2025 – 15 May 2025 | Mistaken Identity | Oceania; Europe | 4 | |
| Pure: Prelude | 24 June 2026 – 14 July 2026 | Pure | Europe; Oceania | 6 | |
| Pure World Tour | 18 February 2027 – 26 April 2027 | Pure | Europe; Oceania | 27 | |

=== As support act ===
List of concert tours, showing headlining artist and the dates, continents and number of shows supported by Delta Goodrem
| Title | Headlining artist | Dates | Continent(s) | Shows | Ref. |
|---|---|---|---|---|---|
| My Christmas | Andrea Bocelli | December 2009 | North America | 6 | |
| Asia Spring Tour | Andrea Bocelli | April – May 2010 | Asia | 5 | |
| Australian and New Zealand Tour | Andrea Bocelli | September 2014 | Oceania | 6 | |
| One World Tour | Ricky Martin | April – May 2015 | Oceania | 6 | |
| DNA World Tour | Backstreet Boys | June – July 2022 | North America | 35 | |
| Australian Tour | Andrea Bocelli | October – November 2022 | Oceania | 2 | |
| Ages & Stages Tour | Tom Jones | March 2024 | Oceania | 1 | |
| UK & Ireland Tour 2024 | Shania Twain | June – July 2024 | Europe | 6 | |
| Talk on Corners Tour | The Corrs | February 2025 | Australia | 1 | |
| The Circus Live – Summer 2026 | Take That | July 2026 | Europe | 1 | |

== Other headlining concerts ==
List of non-tour concerts headlined by Delta Goodrem, showing dates, venue, city, number of shows and performed songs
| Dates | Event | Venue | City | Shows | Performed song(s) | Ref. |
|---|---|---|---|---|---|---|
| 9 October 2007 | Delta album launch | Sydney Opera House | Sydney | 1 | Setlist confirmed to have included: "In This Life"; "Angels in the Room"; "You Will Only Break My Heart"; "Born to Try" | |
| 27 March 2008 – 28 March 2008 | A Night with Delta Goodrem | Seymour Centre | Sydney | 2 | "Edge of Seventeen" (with excerpts from "Innocent Eyes", "Believe Again", "I Don't Care"); "Predictable"; "I Can't Break It to My Heart"; "Lost Without You"; "Possessionless"; "In This Life"; "Mistaken Identity"; "You Will Only Break My Heart" (with Brian McFadden); "Born to Try" (excerpt); "Not Me, Not I"; "One Day"; "Believe Again"; "Black Velvet" | |
| 24 December 2009 | Christmas Carols and Hits | Sydney Opera House | Sydney | 1 | "Angels in the Room"; "Joy to the World"; "In This Life"; "O Holy Night"; "Not Me, Not I"; "Blue Christmas"; "Last Christmas"; "Born to Try"; "All I Want for Christmas Is You"; "Little Drummer Boy"; "Amazing Grace"; "Breathe In, Breathe Out"; "Silent Night"; "Lost Without You"; "Believe Again"; "O Come All Ye Faithful"; "Holiday"; "Have Yourself a Merry Little Christmas" | |
| 8 October 2015 | UK Secret Show | The Dot Project | London | 1 | "Sitting on Top of the World" / "Let Me Entertain You"; "In This Life" / "Wonderwall"; "Born to Try"; "Lost Without You"; "Almost Here"; "Believe Again"; "Innocent Eyes"; "You and You Alone"; "Not Me, Not I"; "Out of the Blue" / "Hey Jude"; "Wings" | |
| 2 April 2020 – 7 October 2021 | The Bunkerdown Sessions (Note: The Bunkerdown Sessions was a series of live-stream concerts which Goodrem performed weekly during Australia's COVID-19 lockdowns.) | Online | Sydney | 36 | Songs performed throughout this series included singles, b-sides, rarities and album tracks from across Goodrem's career, unreleased songs and covers. | |
| 9 May 2023 | Live in Uluru | Uluṟu-Kata Tjuṯa National Park | Uluru | 1 | "I Am Australian"; "Sitting on Top of the World"; "Out of the Blue"; "Not Me, Not I"; "Innocent Eyes"; "The Power"; "Lost Without You"; "In This Life"; "Keep Climbing"; "Almost Here"; "Solid Gold"; "Running Up That Hill"; "Hopelessly Devoted to You"; "Dear Life"; "Predictable"; "Down Under"; "Wings" | |

== Music events and festivals ==
List of music events and festivals featuring a performance by Delta Goodrem, showing date, city and performed songs
| Date | Event | City | Performed song(s) | Ref. |
|---|---|---|---|---|
| 29 March 2002 | Good Friday Appeal | Melbourne | "Born to Try"; "I Don't Care" | |
| 22 December 2002 | Celebrate Christmas in the Capital | Canberra | "Born to Try"; "Silent Night" | |
| 2003^{(Note: Exact date of performance is unknown.)} | Channel 7 Bali Appeal | Unknown | "Born to Try" | |
| 30 October 2004 | The Big C | London | "Out of the Blue"; "Born to Try" | |
| 14 December 2004 | Royal Variety Performance | London | "Almost Here" (with Brian McFadden) | |
| 30 January 2005 | ChildLine Concert | Dublin | "Almost Here" (with Brian McFadden) | |
| 24 December 2006 | Carols by Candlelight | Melbourne | "O Come All Ye Faithful"; "Have Yourself a Merry Little Christmas"; "Happy Christmas (War Is Over)" | |
| 29 April 2008 | J-Wave Golden Week Special | Tokyo | "In This Life"; "Born to Try"; "Live! Together (Tokyo Girls Anthem)" (with Juju) | |
| 8 June 2008 | Los Angeles Pride | Los Angeles | "Right Here with You" (with Olivia Newton-John) | |
| 20 December 2008 | Carols in the Domain | Sydney | "O Holy Night"; "Oh Happy Day" (with Brian McFadden); "Silent Night" | |
| 24 December 2012 | Carols by Candlelight | Melbourne | "Blue Christmas"; "Amazing Grace" | |
| 2 March 2013 | Sydney Gay and Lesbian Mardi Gras (party) | Sydney | Medley: "Sitting on Top of the World" / "Lost Without You" / "Predictable" / "Born to Try" / "Believe Again" | |
| 1 March 2014 | Sydney Gay and Lesbian Mardi Gras (parade) | Sydney | Medley: "Believe Again" / "Heart Hypnotic" / "Lost Without You" / "Sitting on Top of the World" | |
| 10 October 2015 | G-A-Y live performance | London | "Sitting on Top of the World"; "Lost Without You"; "Born to Try"; "Not Me, Not I"; "Predictable"; "Dancing with a Broken Heart"; "Believe Again"; "Wings" | |
| 24 December 2015 | Carols by Candlelight | Melbourne | "O Come All Ye Faithful"; "O Holy Night"; "All I Want for Christmas Is You" | |
| 25 September 2016 | Nickelodeon SlimeFest | Melbourne | "The River"; "Sitting on Top of the World"; "Dear Life"; "Wings" | |
| 16 February 2020 | Fire Fight Australia | Sydney | "I Am Australian"; "Born to Try"; "Let it Rain"; "Sitting on Top of the World"; "In This Life"; "Lost Without You"; "Wings" | |
| 18 April 2020 | Together at Home | Sydney (virtual performance) | "Together We Are One" | |
| 25 April 2020 | Music from the Home Front | Sydney (virtual performance) | "Down Under" (with Colin Hay) | |
| 26 January 2021 | Australia Day Live Concert | Sydney | "Down Under"; "The Horses"; "Lost Without You"; "I Am Australian"; "It's a Long Way to the Top (If You Wanna Rock 'n' Roll)"; "Advance Australia Fair" | |
| 26 February 2021 | G'Day USA AAA Arts Gala | Sydney (virtual performance) | "Solid Gold"; "Down Under" | |
| 25 April 2021 | Music from the Home Front | Melbourne (virtual performance) | "You're the Voice" | |
| 22 May 2021 | Poof Doof live performance | Sydney | "The Power"; Medley: "Wings" / "Lost Without You" / "Solid Gold" / "Born to Try"; "Believe Again"; "The Power" (reprise) | |
| 6 June 2021 | TikTok Live | Sydney | "In This Life"; "Solid Gold"; "Keep Climbing"; "Lost Without You"; "Billionaire"; Neighbours theme song; "Born to Try"; "Kill Them with Kindness" / "Higher Love"; "Enough"; "Heat Waves"; "Innocent Eyes"; "Let It Go"; "Mistaken Identity"; "Out of the Blue"; "Predictable"; "I Knew You Were Trouble"; "Everyone's Famous"; "Hopelessly Devoted To You"; "Eyes on Me"; "Wings"; "The Power" | |
| 25 September 2021 | Global Citizen Live | Sydney (virtual performance) | "Keep Climbing"; "Born to Try"; "The Show Must Go On"; "The Power" | |
| 26 January 2022 | Australia Day Live Concert | Sydney | "Run to Paradise"; "The Power"; "That's Freedom"; "Evie"; "Advance Australia Fair" | |
| 28 May 2022 | BottleRock Napa Valley | Napa | "The Power"; "Lost Without You"; "Billionaire"; "The River"; "Innocent Eyes"; "Crash"; "Dear Life"; "In This Life"; "Almost Here"; "Sitting on Top of the World"; "Solid Gold"; "Paralyzed"; "Wings" | |
| 22 October 2022 | G-A-Y live performance | London | "The Power"; "Wings"; "Lost Without You"; "Solid Gold"; "Born to Try" / "Free"; "Believe Again"; "It's Raining Men"; "I Wanna Dance with Somebody (Who Loves Me)" | |
| 26 February 2023 | State memorial service for Olivia Newton-John | Melbourne | Medley: "Magic" / "Physical" / "Xanadu" / "You're the One That I Want" / "Let Me Be There" / "Hopelessly Devoted to You" / "I Honestly Love You" | |
| 21 June 2023 | Prague Rocks Festival | Prague | "Innocent Eyes"; "The Power"; "Lost Without You"; "Running Up That Hill"; "In This Life"; "Sitting on Top of the World"; "I Wanna Dance With Somebody (Who Loves Me)"; "Dancing Queen"; "Wings" | |
| 18 July 2023 | Isle of MTV | Floriana | "Innocent Eyes"; "The Power"; "Lost Without You"; "Sitting on Top of the World"; "In This Life"; "Back to Your Heart"; "Wings" | |
| 20 February 2024 | BBC Radio 2 Piano Room | London | "Lost Without You"; "Hearts on the Run"; "Rule the World" (with Gary Barlow) – all performed with the BBC Concert Orchestra | |
| 2 June 2024 | Mighty Hoopla | London | "Back to Your Heart"; "The Power"; "Lost Without You"; "Billionaire"; "Innocent Eyes"; "In This Life"; "I'm So Excited"; "I Wanna Dance With Somebody (Who Loves Me)"; "Because You Loved Me"; "Almost Here"; "Man! I Feel Like a Woman!"; "Sitting on Top of the World"; "Born to Try"; "Believe Again"; "Predictable"; "Wings"; "Hearts on the Run" | |
| 8 September 2024 | Radio 2 in the Park | Preston | "Back to Your Heart" / "The Best"; "Lost Without You"; "Innocent Eyes"; "Sitting on Top of the World"; Medley: "Neighbours Theme" / "The Loco-Motion" / "Torn"; "Born to Try"; "Hearts on the Run" | |
| 9 November 2025 | Night At The Point | Hobart, Tasmania | "Back to Your Heart / The Best"; "The Power"; "Lost Without You"; "Out of The Blue"; "In This Life"; "Not Me Not I"; "Mistaken Identity"; "The River"; "Predictable"; "Running Up That Hill (Deal With God)"; "Dear Life"; "Almost Here"; "Solid Gold"; "Last Night On Earth"; "Innocent Eyes"; "Electric Storm"; "Believe Again"; "Wings"; "Hearts on the Run"; "Born To Try"; "Sitting On Top of The World" | |
| 21 February 2026 | Mighty Hoopla | Sydney | | |
| 21 March 2026 | Nordic Eurovision Party | Oslo | "Eclipse" | |
| 11 April 2026 | Eurovision in Concert | Amsterdam | "Eclipse" | |
| 30 May 2026 | Mighty Hoopla | London | "Eclipse"; "Lost Without You"; "Eclipse" (reprise) | |

== Award shows ==
List of award shows featuring a performance by Delta Goodrem, showing date, city and performed songs
| Date | Event | City | Performed song(s) | Ref. |
|---|---|---|---|---|
| 28 January 2003 | 2003 Allan Border Medal | Melbourne | "Born to Try" | |
| 11 May 2003 | 2003 Logie Awards | Melbourne | Medley: "Lost Without You" / "Born to Try" | |
| 17 October 2004 | 2004 ARIA Music Awards | Sydney | "Out of the Blue" | |
| 24 February 2005 | 2005 Meteor Awards | Dublin | "Almost Here" (with Brian McFadden) | |
| 3 March 2005 | 2005 MTV Australia Video Music Awards | Sydney | "Almost Here" (with Brian McFadden) | |
| 31 August 2005 | 2005 World Music Awards | Los Angeles | "Lost Without You" | |
| 5 December 2007 | 2007 Australian Film Institute Awards | Melbourne | "Believe Again" | |
| 13 November 2009 | Nickelodeon Australian Kids' Choice Awards 2009 | Melbourne | Medley: "Queen of the Night" / "Sweet Dreams (Are Made of This)" / "Predictable"; Medley: "In This Life" / "Dance Floor Anthem (I Don't Want to Be in Love)" (with The Madden Brothers) | |
| 17 May 2011 | 2011 BMI Pop Music Awards | Beverly Hills | "The Prayer" (with Cody Karey) | |
| 27 November 2011 | 2011 ARIA Music Awards | Sydney | "The Day You Went Away" | |
| 15 April 2012 | 2012 Logie Awards | Melbourne | "Sitting on Top of the World" | |
| 10 January 2014 | 2014 AACTA International Awards | Los Angeles | "Kissing You" | |
| 8 May 2016 | 2016 Logie Awards | Melbourne | "Dear Life" | |
| 5 January 2018 | 2018 AACTA International Awards | Los Angeles | "I Honestly Love You" | |
| 30 June 2019 | 2019 Logie Awards | Queensland | Medley: "Sitting on Top of the World" / "Wings" / "In This Life" / "Lost Without You" / "Born to Try" / "Physical" | |
| 25 November 2020 | 2020 ARIA Music Awards | Sydney | "I Am Woman" (performed as part of an ensemble) | |

== Sporting events ==
List of sporting events featuring a performance by Delta Goodrem, showing date, city and performed songs
| Date | Event | City | Performed song(s) | Ref. |
|---|---|---|---|---|
| 24 September 2005 | 2005 AFL Grand Final | Melbourne | "I Am Australian" | |
| 15 March 2006 | 2006 Commonwealth Games opening ceremony | Melbourne | "Together We Are One" | |
| 6 November 2007 | 2007 Melbourne Cup | Melbourne | "Advance Australia Fair" | |
| 23 May 2012 | 2012 State of Origin series | Melbourne | "Sitting on Top of the World" | |
| 4 April 2018 | 2018 Commonwealth Games opening ceremony | Gold Coast | "Welcome to Earth" | |
| 2 November 2021 | 2021 Melbourne Cup | Melbourne | "Tenterfield Saddler"; "Keep Climbing"; "The Power" | |
| 9 September 2022 | 2022 AFL finals series | Melbourne | "Advance Australia Fair" | |
| 24 September 2022 | 2022 AFL Grand Final | Melbourne | "Kids" (with Robbie Williams) | |
| 27 November 2022 | 2022 AFL Women's season 7 Grand Final | Springfield | Medley: "In This Life" / "Wings" | |
| 7 November 2023 | 2023 Melbourne Cup | Melbourne | "Born to Try" | |
| 2 April 2024 | Gather Round Spectacular | Adelaide | "Hearts on the Run"; Medley: "Back to Your Heart" / "Wings" / "Lost Without You" / "In This Life" / "Let Me Entertain You" / "Sitting on Top of the World" | |
| 2 August 2026 | 2026 Commonwealth Games closing ceremony | Glasgow | Medley: "Born to Try" / "Sitting on Top of the World" / "Eclipse" / "Lost Without You" / "Wings"; "Warrior"; "You're the Voice" (with Cammy Barnes) | |
| 27 August 2026 | 2026 Weltklasse Zürich | Zürich | "Lost Without You"; "Eclipse" | |

== Television programs ==
=== 2000s ===
List of television programs featuring a performance by Delta Goodrem, showing date, city and performed songs
| Date | Program | City | Performed song(s) | Ref. |
|---|---|---|---|---|
| November 2002 | Good Morning Australia | Melbourne | "Born to Try" | |
| 18 February 2003 | Rove Live | Melbourne | "Lost Without You" | |
| 21 March 2003 | Top of the Pops | London | "Born to Try" | |
| 30 April 2003 | The Panel | Melbourne | "Lost Without You" | |
| 28 May 2003 | GMTV | London | "Lost Without You" | |
| 31 May 2003 | Top of the Pops Saturday | London | "Lost Without You" | |
| 16 June 2003 | Micallef Tonight | Melbourne | "Innocent Eyes" | |
| 27 June 2003 | Top of the Pops | London | "Lost Without You" | |
| 29 June 2003 | Live at Channel V HQ | Sydney | "Will You Fall For Me"; "Not Me, Not I"; "Born to Try"; "Throw It Away"; "Predictable"; "Lost Without You"; "Innocent Eyes"; "Butterfly" | |
| 22 October 2004 | Top of the Pops | London | "Out of the Blue" | |
| 30 October 2004 | Top of the Pops Saturday | London | "Out of the Blue" | |
| 6 November 2004 | CD:UK | London | "Out of the Blue" | |
| 2004 | GMTV | London | "Out of the Blue" | |
| 9 November 2004 | Rove Live | Melbourne | "Out of the Blue" | |
| 10 November 2004 | The Panel | Melbourne | "Be Strong" | |
| 17 December 2004 | Today with Des and Mel | London | "Be Strong" | |
| 18 December 2004 | CD:UK | London | "Happy Christmas (War Is Over)" | |
| 18 December 2004 | Top of the Pops Saturday | London | "Almost Here" (with Brian McFadden) | |
| 24 January 2005 | GMTV | London | "Almost Here" (with Brian McFadden) | |
| 31 January 2005 | Today with Des and Mel | London | "Almost Here" (with Brian McFadden) | |
| 4 February 2005 | Senkveld | Bergen | "Almost Here" (with Brian McFadden) | |
| 5 February 2005 | CD:UK | London | "Almost Here" (with Brian McFadden) | |
| 11 February 2005 | Top of the Pops | London | "Almost Here" (with Brian McFadden) | |
| 19 February 2005 | Top of the Pops Saturday | London | "The Analyst" | |
| 27 February 2005 | Nur die Liebe zählt | Berlin | "Almost Here" (with Brian McFadden) | |
| 16 March 2005 | TV total | Cologne | "Almost Here" (with Brian McFadden) | |
| 19 March 2005 | Bravo Super Show | Hannover | "Almost Here" (with Brian McFadden) | |
| 14 June 2005 | Rove Live | Melbourne | "A Little Too Late" | |
| 17 June 2005 | Sunrise | Sydney | "A Little Too Late"; "Be Strong" | |
| 31 August 2005 | Today | New York | "Lost Without You" | |
| 15 October 2005 | Rove Live | Melbourne | "Last Night on Earth" | |
| 17 October 2005 | Today | Sydney | "Last Night on Earth" | |
| 18 November 2005 | The MAX Sessions | Sydney | "Lost Without You" (with Darren Hayes) | |
| 18 November 2006 | The X Factor | London | "All Out of Love" (with Westlife) | |
| 16 October 2007 | Dancing with the Stars | Melbourne | "In This Life" | |
| 26 October 2007 | Sunrise | Sydney | "In This Life"; "You Will Only Break My Heart"; "Not Me, Not I" | |
| 2 November 2007 | Live at the Chapel | Melbourne | "Believe Again"; "Possessionless"; "Burn for You"; "Born to Try"; "In This Life"; "Not Me, Not I"; "God Laughs"; "Lost Without You"; "You Will Only Break My Heart" | |
| 12 November 2007 | Australian Idol | Sydney | "Believe Again" | |
| 27 November 2007 | Today (at Federation Square) | Melbourne | "Believe Again"; "In This Life" (with Brian McFadden); "God Laughs"; "Born to Try" | |
| 1 February 2008 | The MAX Sessions | Sydney | "Innocent Eyes"; "In This Life"; "Born to Try"; "Black Velvet"; "Believe Again"; "I Can't Break It to My Heart"; "Mistaken Identity"; "Brave Face"; "You Will Only Break My Heart" | |
| 31 March 2008 | So You Think You Can Dance | Sydney | "You Will Only Break My Heart" | |
| 3 April 2008 | Sunrise | Sydney | "Possessionless"; "You Will Only Break My Heart" | |
| 17 July 2008 | The View | New York | "In This Life" | |
| 17 August 2008 | Rove Live | Melbourne | "I Can't Break It to My Heart" | |
| 27 August 2008 | Sunrise | Sydney | "I Can't Break It to My Heart"; "In This Life" | |
| 24 September 2008 | Late Show with David Letterman | New York | "In This Life" | |

=== 2010s ===
List of television programs featuring a performance by Delta Goodrem, showing date, city and performed songs
| Date | Program | City | Performed song(s) | Ref. |
|---|---|---|---|---|
| 10 May 2011 | Dancing with the Stars | Los Angeles | "I'm Not Ready" (with Michael Bolton); "(You Make Me Feel Like) A Natural Woman" | |
| 20 June 2011 | Today | New York | "I'm Not Ready" (with Michael Bolton) | |
| 15 April 2012 | The Voice (season 1) | Sydney | "Crazy" (with Seal, Joel Madden and Keith Urban) | |
| 30 April 2012 | The Voice (season 1) | Sydney | "One" (with Seal, Joel Madden and Keith Urban) | |
| 9 May 2012 | Today | Sydney | "Sitting on Top of the World" | |
| 14 May 2012 | The Voice (season 1) | Sydney | "Sing" (with Seal, Joel Madden and Keith Urban) | |
| 28 May 2012 | The Voice (season 1) | Sydney | "Born to Try" (with 'Team Delta' contestants) | |
| 18 June 2012 | The Voice (season 1) | Sydney | "The Prayer" (with Rachael Leahcar) | |
| 22 August | Today | Sydney | "Dancing with a Broken Heart"; Medley: "Not Me, Not I" / "Lost Without You" / "Believe Again" | |
| 26 October 2012 | A Current Affair | Sydney | "Wish You Were Here"; "Predictable" | |
| 29 October 2012 | Sunrise | Sydney | "Wish You Were Here"; Medley: "Out of the Blue" / "Be Strong"; "Sitting on Top of the World" | |
| 18 November 2012 | New Zealand's Got Talent | Auckland | "Wish You Were Here" | |
| 7 April 2013 | The Voice (season 2) | Sydney | "Diamonds" (with Seal, Joel Madden and Ricky Martin) | |
| 23 April 2013 | The Voice (season 2) | Sydney | "Uprising" (with Seal, Joel Madden and Ricky Martin) | |
| 23 May 2013 | The Ellen DeGeneres Show | Los Angeles | "Ain't No Mountain High Enough" (with Michael Bolton) | |
| 27 May 2013 | The Voice (season 2) | Sydney | "Bayini" (with Gurrumul Yunupingu) | |
| 10 June 2013 | The Voice (season 2) | Sydney | "Livin' la Vida Loca" (with Seal, Joel Madden and Ricky Martin) | |
| 17 June 2013 | The Voice (season 2) | Sydney | "Go Your Own Way" (with Celia Pavey) | |
| 17 June 2013 | The Voice (season 2) | Sydney | "Heart Hypnotic" | |
| 28 June 2015 | The Voice (season 4) | Sydney | "Bang Bang" (with Ricky Martin, Jessie J and The Madden Brothers) | |
| 19 July 2015 | The Voice (season 4) | Sydney | "We Will Rock You" (with Ricky Martin, Jessie J and The Madden Brothers) | |
| 9 August 2015 | The Voice (season 4) | Sydney | "Wings" | |
| 10 August 2015 | Today | Sydney | "Wings" | |
| 16 August 2015 | The Voice (season 4) | Sydney | "Sitting on Top of the World" (with 'Team Delta' contestants) | |
| 23 August 2015 | The Voice (season 4) | Sydney | "Let It Be" (with Ricky Martin, Jessie J and The Madden Brothers) | |
| 1 October 2015 | The NRL Footy Show | Sydney | Medley: "Lost Without You" / "Sitting on Top of the World" / "Born to Try" / "Wings" / "Innocent Eyes" | |
| 1 May 2016 | The Voice (season 5) | Sydney | "Hello" (with Ronan Keating, Jessie J and The Madden Brothers) | |
| 11 May 2016 | Today | Sydney | "Dear Life" | |
| 11 May 2016 | The NRL Footy Show | Sydney | "Dear Life" | |
| 29 May 2016 | The Voice (season 5) | Sydney | "One Way or Another (Teenage Kicks)" (with Ronan Keating, Jessie J and The Madden Brothers) | |
| 3 July 2016 | The Voice (season 5) | Sydney | "Enough" (with Gizzle) | |
| 4 July 2016 | Today | Sydney | "Enough" (with Gizzle) | |
| 4 July 2016 | Today Extra | Sydney | "Dear Life" | |
| 6 July 2016 | The NRL Footy Show | Sydney | "Enough" (with Gizzle) | |
| 10 July 2016 | The Voice (season 5) | Sydney | "Beneath Your Beautiful" (with Alfie Arcuri) | |
| 10 July 2016 | The Voice (season 5) | Sydney | "True Colors" (with Adam Ladell) | |
| 27 September 2016 | Sunrise | Sydney | "The River"; Medley: "Lost Without You" / "In This Life" | |
| 27 September 2016 | The Morning Show | Sydney | Medley: "Dear Life" / "Sitting on Top of the World" | |
| 29 September 2016 | The NRL Footy Show | Sydney | "The River" | |
| 5 October 2016 | The Morning Show | Sydney | "The River" | |
| 19 March 2017 | The Voice (season 6) | Sydney | "You're the Voice" (with Seal, Kelly Rowland and Boy George) | |
| 24 April 2017 | The Voice (season 6) | Sydney | "Vertigo" (with Seal, Kelly Rowland and Boy George) | |
| 28 May 2017 | The Voice (season 6) | Sydney | "Dream On" (with Seal, Kelly Rowland and Boy George) | |
| 2 July 2017 | The Voice (season 6) | Sydney | "I Was Here" (with Judah Kelly) | |
| 28 September 2017 | The NRL Footy Show | Sydney | Medley: "Better" / "Lay Down Your Guns" / "T.N.T." / "Never Tear Us Apart" | |
| 15 April 2018 | The Voice (season 7) | Sydney | "Heroes" (with Joe Jonas, Kelly Rowland and Boy George) | |
| 29 April 2018 | The Voice (season 7) | Sydney | "I'm Every Woman" (with Kelly Rowland) | |
| 15 February 2019 | KTLA Morning News | Los Angeles | "Hopelessly Devoted To You" | |
| 15 February 2019 | California Live | Los Angeles | "I Honestly Love You" | |
| 19 May 2019 | The Voice (season 8) | Sydney | "In the Air Tonight" (with Guy Sebastian, Kelly Rowland and Boy George) | |
| 7 July 2019 | The Voice (season 8) | Sydney | "Bitter Sweet Symphony" (with Daniel Shaw) | |
| 7 July 2019 | The Voice (season 8) | Sydney | "You Say" (with Jordan Anthony) | |

=== 2020s ===
List of television programs featuring a performance by Delta Goodrem, showing date, city and performed songs
| Date | Program | City | Performed song(s) | Ref. |
|---|---|---|---|---|
| 21 February 2020 | Today | Sydney | "Let It Rain" | |
| 12 April 2020 | Today | Sydney (virtual performance) | "The Window Sill Song" | |
| 12 July 2020 | The Voice (season 9) | Sydney | "Keep Climbing" | |
| 19 July 2020 | The Voice (season 9) | Sydney | "Running Up That Hill" (with Stellar Perry) | |
| 19 July 2020 | The Voice (season 9) | Sydney | "Paralyzed" | |
| 29 July 2020 | Sky News Australia | Sydney | "Paralyzed" | |
| 9 October 2020 | Sunrise | Sydney | "Solid Gold"; Medley: "Sitting on Top of the World" / "Wings" / "In This Life" / "Lost Without You" / "Predictable" / "Out of the Blue" / "Born to Try" | |
| 21 October 2020 | The Kelly Clarkson Show | Sydney (virtual performance) | "Solid Gold" | |
| 11 December 2020 | Sunrise | Sydney | "Santa Claus Is Coming To Town"; "Have Yourself a Merry Little Christmas" | |
| 11 December 2020 | The Morning Show | Sydney | "Only Santa Knows" | |
| 12 December 2020 | Sunrise | Sydney | "Rockin' Around the Christmas Tree" | |
| 12 December 2020 | Christmas with Delta | Sydney | See main article: Christmas with Delta | |
| 14 December 2020 | The Morning Show | Sydney | "Rudolph the Red-Nosed Reindeer" | |
| 15 December 2020 | The Morning Show | Sydney | "White Christmas" | |
| 16 December 2020 | The Morning Show | Sydney | "The Little Drummer Boy" | |
| 18 December 2020 | The Morning Show | Sydney | "Silent Night" | |
| 21 December 2020 | The Morning Show | Sydney | "Grown Up Christmas List" | |
| 14 May 2021 | Sunrise | Sydney | "Kill Them With Kindness"; "Solid Gold"; "Paralyzed"; "Billionaire" | |
| 14 May 2021 | The Morning Show | Sydney | "The Power"; "Dear Elton" | |
| 27 May 2021 | Paul Murray Live | Wagga Wagga | "All of My Friends"; "Not Me, Not I" | |
| 11 December 2021 | Christmas with Delta | Sydney | See main article: Christmas with Delta | |
| 12 December 2021 | The Sound | Sydney | "Never Tear Us Apart" (with Josh Teskey) | |
| 10 December 2022 | Christmas with Delta | Sydney | See main article: Christmas with Delta | |
| 18 July 2023 | Isle of MTV | The Granaries, Floriana, Malta | "Innocent Eyes", "The Power", "Lost Without You", "Sitting On Top of The World', "In This Life", "Back to Your Heart", "Wings" | |
| 1 September 2023 | The 6 O'Clock Show | Dublin | "Back to Your Heart" | |
| 29 September 2023 | Sunrise | Melbourne | "Back To Your Heart" | |
| 17 December 2023 | Christmas with Delta | Sydney | See main article: Christmas with Delta | |
| 25 March 2024 | Australian Idol | Sydney | "Hearts on the Run" | |
| 22 December 2024 | Christmas with Delta in Hollywood | Los Angeles | See main article: Christmas with Delta | |
| 21 December 2025 | Christmas with Delta | In Channel 9 Studios In Australia | See main article: Christmas with Delta | |
| 20 March 2026 | God morgen Norge | Oslo | "Eclipse" | |
| 12-16 May 2026 | Eurovision Song Contest 2026 | Vienna, Austria | "Eclipse" | |

== Musical theatre ==
List of musical theatre productions starring Delta Goodrem, showing character, dates and cities
| Dates | Production | Character | City | Ref. |
|---|---|---|---|---|
| October 2015 – February 2016 | Cats | Grizabella | Sydney; Hobart; Melbourne; Brisbane | |
