= Till You Say You'll Be Mine =

1963 single by Jackie DeShannon

"Till You Say You'll Be Mine" is a song composed by American singer-songwriter Jackie DeShannon. The first version of the song was recorded by DeShannon herself, and released in November 1963 as the B-side of her single "When You Walk in the Room". In 1965, three versions of the song were released by other artists: The Fourmost released a version in their album First And Fourmost, The Searchers released a version in their album Sounds Like Searchers and Shirley and Johnny released a version as the B-side of their single "Day Dreamin' of You". Years later, The Primitives also released a cover version of the song in their 2012 album, Echoes and Rhymes.

== Olivia Newton-John version ==
"Till You Say You'll Be Mine"

Single by Olivia Newton-John
- B-side: "For Ever"
- Released: 13 May 1966
- Genre: Pop
- Length: 2:37
- Label: Decca
- Songwriter: Jackie DeShannon

Olivia Newton-John singles chronology
"Till You Say You'll Be Mine" (1966)	"If Not for You" (1971)

Perhaps the most known version of "Till You Say You'll Be Mine", though never a hit, was the first ever single recorded by Australian singer Olivia Newton-John. As the prize for winning a talent competition on Australian TV series Sing, Sing, Sing in 1965, Newton-John went to the United Kingdom and recorded the song as her debut single, being released by Decca Records on 13 May 1966. The song "For Ever", written by Freddie Allen and Julian Bailey, was included as the B-side. The single does not credit the songs's producer(s), simply reading that it is "A Republic Production".

"Till You Say You'll Be Mine" was neither commercially nor critically successful (Newton-John once recalled a review that stated it "sounds like it was recorded in a bathroom") and did not enter on the UK Singles Chart, or any other chart. The failure made it the only Newton-John single released by Decca; she would not release another solo single until 1971 with "If Not for You", by Pye International Records.

Both "Till You Say You'll Be Mine" and "For Ever" were released on the Newton-John album, “If Not For You (Deluxe Edition),” in 2022, on the Primary Wave label as bonus tracks. These tracks were included in some Decca compilations and released on iTunes and Spotify. The original vinyl single became a very desirable collector's item by some Newton-John fans.

In 2018, Australian singer Delta Goodrem released a cover version of "Till You Say You'll Be Mine" for the television minisseries Olivia Newton-John: Hopelessly Devoted to You, in which she plays Newton-John. This cover version was also included in the minisseries soundtrack, I Honestly Love You.

=== Track listing ===
- UK 7" single
1. "Till You Say You'll Be Mine" – 2:37
2. "For Ever" – 2:41
