= Hearts On the Run Tour =

2023 concert tour by Delta Goodrem

- International tour by Delta Goodrem
- Start date: August 22, 2023
- End date: September 15, 2023
- Legs: 1
- No. of shows: 14
Delta Goodrem tour chronology
Bridge over Troubled Dreams Tour
(2022)
- Hearts On the Run Tour
- (2023)
Innocent Eyes 20th Anniversary Tour
(2022)

The Hearts On the Run Tour is the sixth concert tour by Australian recording artist Delta Goodrem. The tour visited nine countries in Europe, beginning on 22 August 2023 in Glasgow, Scotland, and concluding on 15 September 2023 in Stockholm, Sweden.

It marked the first time Goodrem headlined a European tour. It took place one year after the 2022 Bridge Over Troubled Dreams Tour, that supported the release of the artist's seventh studio album, Bridge Over Troubled Dreams (2021), and after Goodrem served as the opening act for the Backstreet Boys' DNA World Tour in North America.

The concerts comprised songs from all of Delta Goodrem's previous albums until 2023.

== Background ==
Goodrem announced the Hearts On the Run Tour through her Instagram account on 23 January 2023. Although being her first tour entirely in Europe, Goodrem had recently achieved success touring the continent. In October 2022, she sold out two concerts in London and one in Berlin as part of the European leg of her Bridge Over Troubled Dreams Tour.

The tour was supposed to begin on 4 April 2023 in Dublin, Ireland. However, it had to be rescheduled to the second semester of 2023 after Goodrem received medical advice to go on "strict vocal rest" She stated on Instagram: "I, unfortunately, overused my vocal cords to the point of me having no voice for extended periods of time."

On 16 June 2023 the definitive fourteen dates for the tour were announced. It would be visiting Denmark, England, France, Germany, Ireland, Norway, Scotland, Sweden, and Switzerland. Goodrem said on her Instagram page they were "still working logistics" for the Madrid show, but no new dates for Spain were announced. As of the definitive dates, Goodrem shared that the Madrid, Paris, and Oslo concerts had been moved to new venues.

== Synopsis ==
The tour was named after Goodrem's song "Hearts On the Run", a 1980s-inspired single which official release took place in 19 February 2024, after the end of the tour.

The Hearts On the Run Tour setlist included songs from all seven Delta Goodrem's studio albums up to 2023. Goodrem opened all dates with the song "Wings" from the 2016 album Wings of the Wild. The concerts had one encore and concluded with the 2007 song "Believe Again".

Goodrem debuted the song "Hearts On the Run" during the first concert of the tour in Glasgow. Besides her own songs, the setlist included two covers: "Smile" by Nat King Cole and Cher's "If I Could Turn Back Time".

Halfway through each of the shows there was an act called "Bunkerdown Session". It was inspired by a series of live performances of the same name hosted by Goodrem on Instagram during the COVID-19 pandemic. During this act, the artist performed songs requested by the audience, including "Fragile" from the album Mistaken Identity and the b-side "Take Me Home".

== Set list ==
This set list is representative of the 4 September 2023 show in Paris, France. It does not represent all dates of the tour.

1. "Wings"
2. "Innocent Eyes"
3. "The Power"
4. "Lost Without You"
5. "In This Life"
6. "Keep Climbing"
7. "Almost Here"
8. "If I Could Turn Back Time" (Cher cover)
9. "Predictable"
10. "Solid Gold"
11. "Out of the Blue"
12. "Paralyzed"
13. "Smile" (Nat King Cole cover)
14. "Dear Life"
15. "Sitting on Top of the World"
16. Bunkerdown Session ("Fragile", "Take Me Home", "Touch", "Not Me, Not I")
17. "Back To Your Heart"

Encore

18. "Play"
19. "Born To Try"
20. "Believe Again"

=== Additional notes ===
The "Bunkerdown Session" act changed every night, as it comprised songs requested by the audience.

== Tour dates ==
List of concerts

Date	City	Country	Venue
Europe
22 August 2023	Glasgow	Scotland	SWG3
24 August 2023	Birmingham	England	O2 Institute
27 August 2023	London	England	Shepherd's Bush Empire
29 August 2023	Dublin	Ireland	The Academy (Note: Originally scheduled to take place at 3Olympia Theatre.)
31 August 2023	Manchester	England	O2 Ritz
3 September 2023	Cologne	Germany	Kantine
4 September 2023	Paris	France	Alhambra (Note: Originally scheduled to take place at Les Étoiles.)
5 September 2023	Zürich	Switzerland	Exil
7 September 2023	Munich	Germany	Ampere (Note: Originally scheduled to take place at Technikum.)
10 September 2023	Hamburg	Germany	Uebel & Gefährlich
11 September 2023	Copenhagen	Denmark	Pumpehuset
12 September 2023	Berlin	Germany	Metropol
14 September 2023	Oslo	Norway	Parkteatret (Note: Originally scheduled to take place at Krøsset.)
15 September 2023	Stockholm	Sweden	Nalen Klubb

== Cancelled shows ==
Date	City	Country	Venue	Ref
11 April 2023	Madrid	Spain	Changó Club (Note: Originally scheduled to take place at Moby Dick Club.)	
