= I Don't Want to Know (disambiguation) =

"I Don't Want to Know" is a 1977 song by Fleetwood Mac.

"I Don't Wanna Know" is a 2004 song by Mario Winans, Enya and P. Diddy.

I Don't Want to Know or I Don't Wanna Know may also refer to:

== Songs ==
- "I Don't Want to Know" (1964), a single by Shirley and Johnny
- "I Don't Want to Know" (1965), by The Zombies from the album Begin Here
- "I Don't Want to Know" (1965), a B-side by Cilla Black from the single "I've Been Wrong Before"
- "I Don't Want to Know" (1969), written by Jerry Herman from the musical Dear World
- "Don't Want to Know" (1973), by John Martyn from the album Solid Air
- "I Don't Want to Know" (1977), by Dr. Feelgood from the album Be Seeing You
- "I Don't Wanna Know" (1985), by Phil Collins from the album No Jacket Required
- "I Don't Wanna Know" (1987), by Indigo Girls from the album Strange Fire
- "I Don't Want to Know" (1990), by Vaya Con Dios from the album Night Owls
- "Don't Want to Know" (1994), by Bryan Ferry from the album Mamouna
- "I Don't Want to Know" (1994), by Gladys Knight from the album Just for You
- "I Don't Wanna Know" (1994), by Katey Sagal from the album Well...
- "I Don't Want to Know" (1995), by Wet Wet Wet from the album Picture This
- "I Don't Wanna Know" (1998), by Julian Lennon from the album Photograph Smile
- "I Don't Wanna Know" (2000), a single by Wicked Beat Sound System
- "I Don't Want to Know" (2003), by Matthew Sweet from the album Kimi Ga Suki
- "I Don't Want to Know (If You Don't Want Me)" (2004), by the Donnas from the album Gold Medal
- "I Don't Wanna Know" (2004), by New Found Glory from the album Catalyst
- "I Don't Want to Know!" (2004), by Reeve Oliver from the album Reeve Oliver
- "I Don't Wanna Know" (2005), by Sheryl Crow from the album Wildflower
- "Bliss (I Don't Wanna Know)" (2005), by Hinder from the album Extreme Behavior
- "I Don't Wanna Know" (2007), by Kimberly Locke from the album Based on a True Story
- "I Don't Wanna Know" (2019), by Charli XCX from the album Charli

== Television ==
- "I Don't Wanna Know" (True Blood), a 2008 episode

== See also ==
- "Don't Wanna Know", a 2016 song by Maroon 5 and Kendrick Lamar
- "I Do' Wanna Know", a 1984 song by REO Speedwagon
- I Want to Know (disambiguation)
