= Innocent Eyes =

Innocent Eyes may refer to:

- Innocent Eyes (musical), 1924 Broadway musical
- Innocent Eyes (Graham Nash album), 1986
- Innocent Eyes (2003 Delta Goodrem album), her debut album
  - "Innocent Eyes" (song), the title single of the above
- Innocent Eyes (2006 Delta Goodrem album), a compilation of her two previous albums, released in Japan
- "Innocent Eyes", a song by Annihilator from the album Refresh the Demon
