= I Wanna Know =

I Wanna Know may refer to:

- "I Wanna Know" (Ai song)
- "I Wanna Know" (Alesso and Jolin Tsai song), 2016
- "I Wanna Know" (Joe song)
- "I Wanna Know" (NOTD song)
- "I Wanna Know" (RL Grime song)
- "I Wanna Know" (Zhang Hao song)

== See also ==
- I Want to Know (disambiguation)
- I Don't Want to Know (disambiguation)
