= Pure (Delta Goodrem album) =

Studio album by Delta Goodrem
- Released: 5 February 2027
- Labels: Atled; Better Now

Delta Goodrem chronology
Bridge over Troubled Dreams (2021)	Pure (2027)

Singles from Pure
- 1. "Hologram" Released: 26 June 2026; 2. "Warrior" Released: 28 August 2026; 3. "Telescope" Released: 13 November 2026

Pure is the eighth studio album by the Australian singer and songwriter Delta Goodrem. It is scheduled for release on 5 February 2027 through Atled and Better Now Records.

The album was supported with a concert tour.

== Background ==
In August 2023, Goodrem announced she had left Sony Music Australia, after 20 years. Goodrem announced her own label Atled Record (Delta backwards) and released "Back to Your Heart".

In March 2026, Special Broadcasting Service confirmed Goodrem would represent Australia in the Eurovision Song Contest 2026 with the song Eclipse The song placed 4th.

== Track listing ==
Pure track listing
No.	Title	Writer(s)	Length
3.	"Telescope"	Goodrem; Ferras Alqaisi; Michael Fatkin]	2:51
4.	"Warrior"	Goodrem; Matthew Copley; Geoff Duncan	3:39
5.	"Hologram"	Goodrem; Alqaisi; Fatkin; Jonas Myrin	3:14
11.	"Eclipse"	Goodrem; Alqaisi; Fatkin; Myrin	3:00
