= I Honestly Love You (album) =

Soundtrack album by Delta Goodrem
- Released: 11 May 2018
- Genre: Pop
- Length: 42:20
- Label: Sony Music Australia

Delta Goodrem chronology
Wings of the Wild (2016)	I Honestly Love You (2018)	Only Santa Knows (2020)

I Honestly Love You is the soundtrack to the Australian biographical miniseries Olivia: Hopelessly Devoted to You, which screened on the Seven Network in two parts on 13 and 20 May 2018. The miniseries tells the story of Olivia Newton-John, an Australian singer, songwriter and actress. The soundtrack comprises the star of the series, Delta Goodrem, performing covers of songs from Newton-John's career and was released in Australia on 11 May 2018.

Upon announcement, Goodrem said: "Having Olivia as a friend for all these years has been such an incredible gift. From a young age, she was an artist I admired and looked up to."

The album was announced and available for pre-order on 29 April 2018, and came with the pre-order duet "Love Is a Gift", to which Newton-John explains: "When we wrote 'Love Is a Gift', we wrote it as a love song. Now, when [Delta and I] sing it, it's about friendship and love between friends and so it still has the same meaning; it's just a different time for the song."

== Reception ==
David from AuspOp gave the album 3 out of 5 and wrote: "Listening through the songs, nothing is overly groundbreaking, but the covers do feel like they have had some attention paid to them". He called the album "decent enough" and "an opportunity to take a look at Olivia Newton-John's music from a different perspective", noting "Physical", "Anyone Who Had a Heart" and "Love Is a Gift" as highlights.

== Track listing ==
I Honestly Love You track listing
No.	Title	Writer(s)	Length
1.	"You're the One That I Want" (featuring Dan Sultan)	John Farrar	3:02
2.	"I Honestly Love You"	Jeff Barry; Peter Allen	3:47
3.	"Physical"	Steve Kipner; Terry Shaddick	3:43
4.	"Magic"	Farrar	4:28
5.	"Hopelessly Devoted to You"	Farrar	2:55
6.	"Xanadu"	Jeff Lynne	3:28
7.	"Let Me Be There" (with Olivia Newton-John)	John Rostill	3:04
8.	"Today" (featuring Georgia Flood)	Chris Andrews	2:15
9.	"Till You Say You'll Be Mine"	Jackie DeShannon	2:31
10.	"Anyone Who Had a Heart"	Burt Bacharach; Hal David	3:17
11.	"If Not for You"	Bob Dylan	2:56
12.	"Trust Yourself"	Newton-John	2:35
13.	"Love Is a Gift" (with Olivia Newton-John)	Newton-John; Victoria Shaw; Earl Rose	4:19
Total length:			42:20

== Charts ==
Chart performance for I Honestly Love You
Chart (2018)	Peak position
Australian Albums (ARIA)	4
New Zealand Heatseeker Albums (RMNZ)	2

== Release history ==
Release history for I Honestly Love You
Region	Date	Format	Label	Catalogue
Australia	11 May 2018	CD; digital download	Sony Music Australia	19075856212
New Zealand	25 May 2018	CD; digital download	Sony Music Australia	19075856212
