= I Want to Know =

I Want to Know may refer to:

- "I Want to Know", a song by Living Colour from Vivid
- "I Want to Know" (Big Little Lies), a television episode

== See also ==
- I Wanna Know (disambiguation)
