= Christmas with Delta =

2020 Australian TV special

- 2020 poster
- Genre: Christmas
- Starring: Delta Goodrem
- Country of origin: Australia
- Original language: English
- No. of episodes: 5

Production
- Production locations: Sydney Opera House (2020); Luna Park Sydney (2021); The Concourse (2022); Sydney Coliseum Theatre (2023); Hollywood, USA (2024).
- Running time: 60 mins (approx.)

Original release
- Network: Nine Network
- Release: 12 December 2020

Christmas with Delta is an annual Christmas special starring Delta Goodrem which originally premiered on the Nine Network on 12 December 2020 to promote her Christmas album Only Santa Knows (2020).

Upon announcement in November 2020, Goodrem said "From drought to bushfires, floods and a global pandemic, 2020 has truly been a tough year for Aussies but it has not broken our spirit. Christmas holds a very special place in my heart, and I can't wait to celebrate our great nation's resilience through music and giving something back to the community during this holiday season."

Originally scheduled as a one-off, the special returned in 2021, 2022 and 2023, at various locations around Sydney. In 2024, the special was recorded in Hollywood, USA.

== Performances ==
All performances by Delta Goodrem, unless otherwise noted.

=== 2020 ===
The 2020 edition was filmed at Sydney Opera House and premiered on 12 December 2020.

1. "Carol of the Bells"
2. "Grown-Up Christmas List"
3. "Rudolph the Red-Nosed Reindeer"
4. "Santa Baby" (with Robbie Williams)
5. "Have Yourself a Merry Little Christmas"/"White Christmas"/"Little Drummer Boy" (medley) (with Hugh Sheridan)
6. "We Need a Little Christmas" by Pentatonix
7. "Merry Christmas to You" (with Olivia Newton-John)
8. "All I Want for Christmas Is You" by Morgan Evans
9. "Rockin' Around the Christmas Tree " (with Sheppard)
10. "Only Santa Knows"
11. "River" (with Montaigne)
12. "When You Wish Upon a Star" (with Kylie Minogue)
13. "Santa Claus is Coming to Town" (with Kelly Rowland, Sheppard and Montaigne)

The 2020 edition was watched by 380,000 overnight metro viewers and was the most-popular entertainment program of the night.

=== 2021: Christmas with Delta Goodrem ===
The 2021 edition was filmed at Luna Park Sydney and premiered on 11 December 2021.

Upon announcement, Goodrem said "I'm so grateful to all the incredible artists and dear friends of mine from around the world who have joined me this year to bring to life our second Christmas special. A truly magical night full of festive cheer and holiday spirit, celebrating Christmas the Australian way."

1. "Carol of the Bells"
2. "Christmas (Baby Please Come Home)"
3. "Merry Christmas to You"
4. "Sleigh Ride" (with Gary Barlow)
5. "It's Beginning to Look a Lot Like Christmas" by Cody Simpson
6. "Rudolph the Red-Nosed Reindeer"/"Frosty the Snowman" (with Harts)
7. "Jingle Bell Rock" (with Natalie Imbruglia)
8. "One Little Christmas Tree" (with Jason Arrow)
9. "Have Yourself a Merry Little Christmas" (with Craig David)
10. "Only Santa Knows"
11. "Christmas without You" by Sheppard
12. "I'll Be Home for Christmas"
13. "Silent Night" (with Paul Kelly and Mitch Tambo)
14. "How to Make Gravy" by Paul Kelly and Dan Kelly
15. "Amazing Grace" (with Andrea Bocelli)
16. "Happy Xmas (War Is Over)" (with guests)

=== 2022 ===
The 2022 edition was filmed at The Concourse and premiered on 10 December 2022. It was watched by 472,000 viewers.

1. "Carol of the Bells"
2. "It’s the Most Wonderful Time of the Year"
3. "Last Christmas" (with Conrad Sewell)
4. "The Christmas Song" by Sam Fischer
5. "Sleigh Ride" (with Sister2Sister)
6. "Someday Christmas" by Hanson and Conrad Sewell
7. "Merry Christmas to You" (with Olivia Newton-John) (from 2020 as a tribute)
8. "You Make It Feel Like Christmas" (studio recording by Gwen Stefani)
9. "What Child Is This?"
10. "Let's Get Christmas Going" (with Bryan Adams)
11. "Have Yourself a Merry Little Christmas" (with Thelma Plum)
12. "Blue Christmas" by The Lumineers
13. "Only Santa Knows"
14. "White Christmas" by Anne-Marie
15. "All You Need is Love" (with Conrad Sewell)

=== 2023 ===
The 2023 edition was filmed at Sydney Coliseum Theatre and premiered on 17 December 2023. It had 440,000 viewers.

1. "It's Beginning to Look a Lot Like Christmas" (with Robbie Williams)
2. "Rockin' Around the Christmas Tree" (with Rai Thistlethwayte)
3. "Christmas (Baby Please Come Home)" by G Flip
4. "This Christmas" (with Teddy Swims)
5. "Superstar"/"Everything's Alright" (medley) (with Jon Stevens and Kate Ceberano)
6. "Hallelujah" (with Jon Stevens)
7. "Little Drummer Boy" (with Drummer Queens)
8. "Jingle Bell Rock" (with Bebe Rexha)
9. "Merry Christmas Everyone" (with David Campbell)
10. "Let Your Light Shine" (with Russell Crowe)
11. "Grown Up Christmas List" (with Kate Ceberano)
12. "Silent Night" (with Budjerah)
13. "Born to Try" (excerpt)
14. "Only Santa Knows"
15. "Feliz Navidad" (with others)

=== 2024: Christmas with Delta in Hollywood ===
The fifth edition was titled Christmas with Delta in Hollywood. It was the first not recorded in front of a live audience. It contained new recording and "highlights" from previous years. It premiered on 22 December 2024 and was the 3rd most watch program of the evening with 474,000 viewers, It was beaten in the ratings by the Big Bash League match between Sydney and Brisbane and the Seven's News program.

1. "Santa Claus is Coming to Town"
2. "Run, Run Rudolph" (with Pat Monahan)
3. "Santa Baby" (with Robbie Williams) (from 2020)
4. "Have Yourself a Merry Little Christmas" (with Craig David) (from 2021)
5. "Kid at Christmas" (with Calum Scott and Christina Perri)
6. "The Christmas Song" (with Lukas Nelson)
7. "Christmas (Baby Please Come Home)" by G Flip (from 2023)
8. "Do You Hear What I Hear?"
9. "Silent Night" (with Paul Kelly and Mitch Tambo) (from 2021)
10. "I'll Be Home for Christmas"/"Down Under" (with Colin Hay)
11. "This Christmas" (with Teddy Swims) (from 2023)
12. "Merry Christmas Everyone" (with David Campbell) (from 2023)
13. "Jingle Bells" (with Howie Dorough)
14. "Hallelujah" (with Josh Groban)
15. "Merry Christmas to You" (with Olivia Newton-John) (from 2020)
16. Guitar solo (by Hudson Stone from The Rookies)
17. "Only Santa Knows"
18. "When You Wish Upon a Star" (with Kylie Minogue) (from 2020)
19. "Joy to the World"

=== 2025: Christmas with Delta ===
The sixth edition took place in Channel 9 studios. It premiered on 21 December 2025 and was the most watch program of the evening, after a Big Bash League match and Seven's News with 603,000 viewers.

1. "Winter Wonderland"
2. Interview with 5 Seconds of Summer and brief performance of "Rockin' Around the Christmas Tree"
3. "Let It Snow! Let It Snow! Let It Snow! (with David Campbell)
4. "Secret Santa (by Jordin Sparks)
5. "Baby, It's Cold Outside" (with Cody Simpson)
6. "Rudolph, the Red-Nosed Reindeer" (with Danielle Spencer)
7. "Run Run Rudolph" (with Marty McFly and the Australian cast of Back to the Future: The Musical)
8. "White Christmas" (with Amy Shark)
9. "Christmas (Baby Please Come Home)" (by Lulu)
10. "Silent Night" (with Pete Murray and S2S School of Singing choir)
11. "Jingle Bell Rock" (with Samantha Jade, Sophie Monk and Amy Shark)
12. "Have Yourself a Merry Little Christmas" (by Gregory Porter)
13. "Blue Christmas" (with Morgan Evans)
14. Christmas Comedy by Monty Franklin
15. "Only Santa Knows"
16. "I Wish It Could Be Christmas Everyday" (with S2S choir)

=== 2026: Christmas with Delta ===
This edition was filmed in London, due to Goodrem being a contestant on Strictly Come Dancing series 24 at the time of filming. It will feature Craig David and Sam Ryder.
