= Olivia Newton-John: Hopelessly Devoted to You =

Australian television miniseries (2018)

- Genre: Biopic Drama
- Written by: Elizabeth Coleman; Pip Karmel; Keith Thompson
- Directed by: Shawn Seet
- Starring: Delta Goodrem
- Country of origin: Australia
- Original language: English
- No. of episodes: 2

Production
- Executive producers: Jo Porter; Julie McGauran
- Producer: Margot McDonald
- Running time: 88 minutes
- Production company: FremantleMedia Australia

Original release
- Network: Seven Network
- Release: 13 May – 20 May 2018

Olivia Newton-John: Hopelessly Devoted to You is an Australian miniseries based on the Australian singer/songwriter and actress Olivia Newton-John. The miniseries premiered on 13 May 2018 and concluded on 20 May 2018 on the Seven Network.

== Production ==
In November 2016, Delta Goodrem was announced to play the main role of Olivia Newton-John. Even though Goodrem is contracted to Nine, they gave her permission to star in the series. In December 2016, the series commenced filming in Melbourne.

== Cast ==
- Delta Goodrem as Olivia Newton-John
- Morgan Griffin as young Olivia
- Kate Jenkinson as Pat Carroll
- Georgia Flood as young Pat
- Robyn Malcolm as Irene Newton-John
- Richard Bligh as Brinley Newton-John
- Todd Lasance as Lee Kramer
- Richard Brancatisano as Matt Lattanzi
- George Xanthis as John Travolta
- Paul David-Goddard as John Farrar
- Ben Shumann as young John
- Diana Glenn as Nancy Chuda
- Lucy Honigman as Helen Reddy
- Gyton Grantley as Roger Davies
- Hugo Johnstone-Burt as Bruce Welch
- Anthony Brandon Wong as Patrick McDermott
- Will Ewing as Ian Turpie
- Jeremy Lindsay-Taylor as John Easterling
- Grant Cartwright as Peter Allen
- Alison Bell as Betsy Cox
- Alicia Banit as Chloe Lattanzi
- Lily Jones as young Chloe
- Sam Duncan as Johnny O'Keefe
- Samantha Morley as Yvonne McDermott
- Ashley Stocco
- Tim Campbell as Brendan Murphy
- Tony Nikolakopoulos as Artie Mogull
- Tony Rickards as Dr Levinson
- Ian Bliss as Val Guest (uncredited)

== Criticism ==
According to Newton-John's daughter, Chloe Lattanzi, the series was created without Olivia's knowledge, participation or consent. Lattanzi told Women's Day, "What's upsetting is the way it's been done. Not one part of it has come directly from our family, it is completely unauthorised. Nobody asked us to take part or consulted us about accuracy. [sic] and it's weird that some of the heaviest and saddest times of our lives have been turned into a fictional TV miniseries for the sole purpose of entertainment." Olivia later consented to the series providing the profits went to her cancer hospital.

== Soundtrack ==
On 11 May 2018, Sony Music Australia released the soundtrack I Honestly Love You, which is credited to Delta Goodrem. It includes 13 tracks; two of the songs are duets with Olivia Newton-John herself.

== Home media ==
A Region 4 DVD was released in Australia on 6 June 2018 by Roadshow Entertainment.

== Distribution ==
The series debuted in the United States on Lifetime on 16 February 2019.

== Reception ==
=== Viewership ===
No.	Title	Air date	Overnight ratings		Consolidated ratings		Total viewers	Ref(s)
No.	Title	Air date	Viewers	Rank	Viewers	Rank	Total viewers	Ref(s)
1	Part One	Sunday 13 May 2018	735,000	5	144,000	5	879,000	
2	Part Two	Sunday 20 May 2018	488,000	9	113,000	8	601,000	
