= Eclipse (Delta Goodrem song) =

2026 single by Delta Goodrem

Single by Delta Goodrem
- Released: 1 March 2026
- Length: 3:00
- Label: Alted; Better Now
- Songwriters: Delta Goodrem; Michael Fatkin; Jonas Myrin; Ferras Alqaisi
- Producer: Michael Fatkin

Delta Goodrem singles chronology
"Hearts on the Run" (2024)	"Eclipse" (2026)	"Hologram" (2026)

Music videos
- "Eclipse" on YouTube "Eclipse" (Steve Anderson remix) on YouTube

Eurovision Song Contest 2026 entry
- Country: Australia
- Artist: Delta Goodrem
- Languages: English

Finals performance
- Semi-final result: 3rd
- Semi-final points: 222
- Final result: 4th
- Final points: 287

Entry chronology
- ◄ "Milkshake Man" (2025)

Official performance videos
- "Eclipse" (second semi-final) on YouTube "Eclipse" (grand final) on YouTube

"Eclipse" is a song by the Australian singer and songwriter Delta Goodrem, released on 1 March 2026 through Atled and Better Now Records. It was written by Goodrem in collaboration with producer Michael Fatkin, alongside co-writers Jonas Myrin and Ferras Alqaisi. "Eclipse" represented Australia in the Eurovision Song Contest 2026, becoming the first Australian entry to qualify for the final, since the 2023 entry, "Promise". It placed fourth with 287 points and will be included on Goodrem's eighth studio album, Pure (2027).

"Eclipse" peaked at number ninety-nine on the ARIA Singles Chart, number two on the ARIA Top 20 Australian Artist Singles Chart, and secured the top position on the AIR Independent Singles Chart. It also reached the top ten on both the UK Singles Sales Chart and the Singles Downloads Chart.

== Background ==
=== Conception and composition ===
"Eclipse" was written and produced by Michael Fatkin, with additional writing credit to Delta Goodrem, Jonas Myrin, and Ferras Alqaisi. In an interview with Hope 103.2, Myrin revealed the song's concept came to him while on a plane traveling to Australia to work with Goodrem. He described the song's central concept as being inspired by "those rare, almost supernatural moments in life that feel like glimpses of heaven", with the eclipse phenomenon representing a symbol of unity and alignment.

== Eurovision Song Contest 2026 ==
=== Internal selection ===
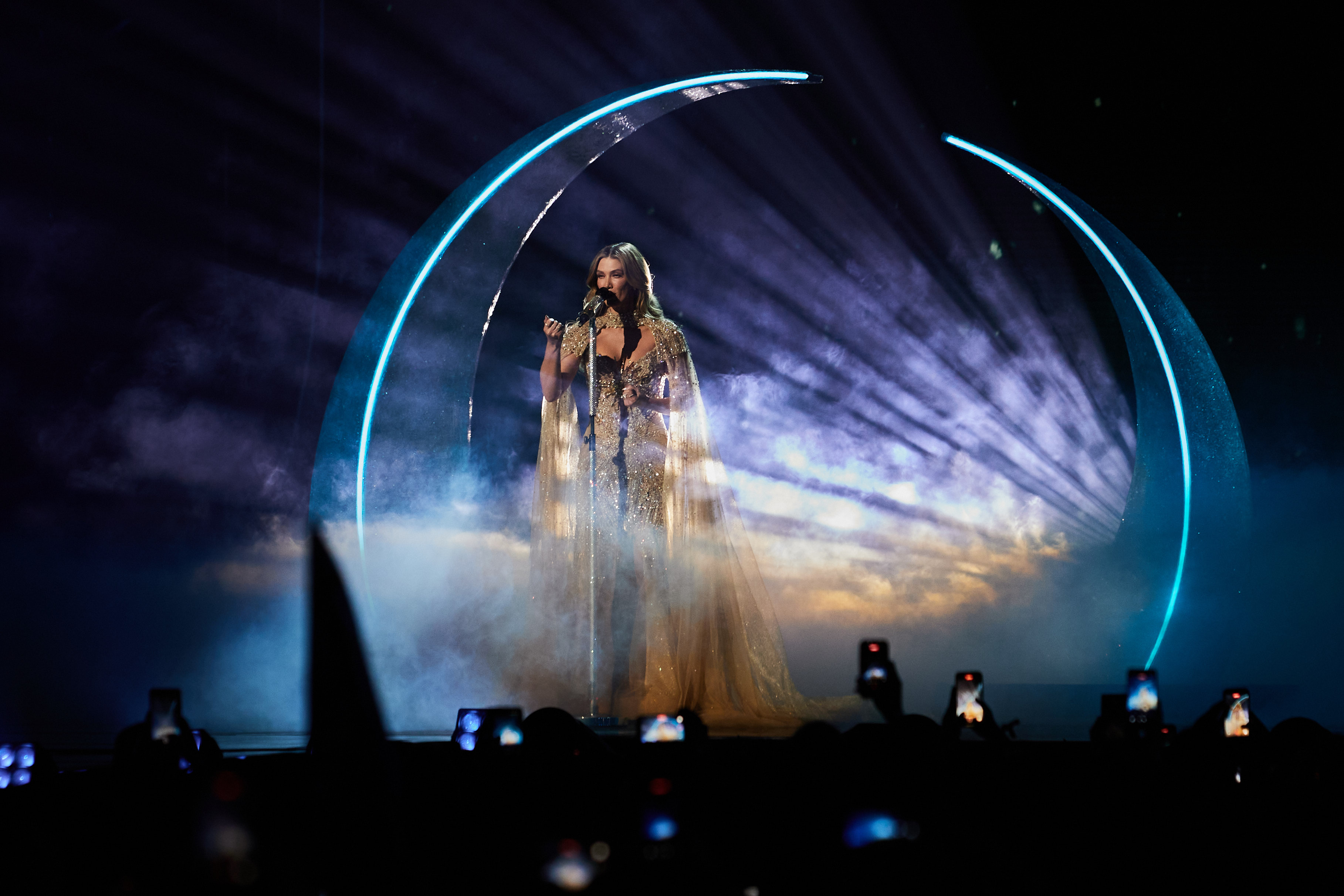
Goodrem performing "Eclipse" during the semi-finals, which features staging and production by Dan Shipton and Ross Nicholson.

On 3 September 2025, at their upfront presentation, SBS announced its intention to participate in the Eurovision Song Contest 2026. On 1 March 2026, it was revealed that Goodrem was selected to represent Australia. In a statement to the press, Goodrem called her selection "a celebration" and cited previous Eurovision performers Celine Dion and Olivia Newton-John as her influences.

=== Eurovision ===
The Eurovision Song Contest 2026 took place at Wiener Stadthalle in Vienna, Austria. The event featured two semi-finals on 12 and 14 May, followed by the grand final on 16 May 2026. In the allocation draw conducted on 12 January 2026, Australia was assigned to compete in the second semi-final, performing in the latter half of the show. Goodrem performed eleventh, succeeding Denmark's Søren Torpegaard Lund and preceding Ukraine's Leléka, placing third with 222 points. Advancing to the finals, she performed eighth, succeeding Ukraine's Leléka and preceding Serbia's Lavina. Goodrem placed fourth, earning 287 points.

=== Staging and production ===
Goodrem's performance was staged and produced by Dan Shipton and Ross Nicholson of Black Skull Creative.

=== Reactions to performance ===
Following Goodrem's dress rehearsal, several publications praised her performance. Digital Spy believed that she "sounded like a winner" in their headline. News.com.au wrote that her rehearsal proved her to be a fan favourite, while reviewing that Goodrem "flawlessly belted" the song. Following her performance at the semi-final (14 May), The Guardian described the performance as "precise and undeniable", despite also believing it to be "safe". They further noted Goodrem's vocal performance as "note-perfect" in comparison to the studio recording. The Sydney Morning Herald's Michael Idato predicted the performance would be "destined for the history books". In their review of Goodrem's semi-final performance, Alt Bollywood noted she showcased a "masterclass" in "[c]inematic [s]torytelling".

Anthony Albanese, the prime minister of Australia, praised Goodrem's performance during the finals. In a statement, he remarked: "Delta Goodrem is someone who can be very, very proud of her efforts. And all Australians are proud of Delta." Rolling Stone Australia described the performance as one of the year's best.

== Critical reception ==
NPR recognised "Eclipse" as an honourable mention on their list of the top ten best songs competing at Eurovision. However, Glen Weldon characterised the song's lyrical content as "willfully obtuse" and deemed it "hilariously overproduced".

== Commercial performance ==
In Australia, "Eclipse" debuted at number 99 on the ARIA Singles Chart, and peaked at number two on the ARIA Top 20 Australian Artist Singles Chart. This achievement is notable as it marks the eighth Australian Eurovision release to appear on the ARIA Charts and represents Goodrem's first charting single since 2020's "Paralyzed". It later peaked at number two on the chart. Additionally, it entered at number one on the AIR Independent Singles Chart. Elsewhere, "Eclipse" peaked on the UK Singles Sales Chart at number six and reached number four on the Singles Downloads Chart. It charted at number 44 in Finland and number 70 in Sweden.

During the solar eclipse of August 12 2026, Spotify noted a 40 per cent increase in streaming of the song worldwide.

== Music video ==
Liam Pethick directed the music video for "Eclipse", which was produced by Brian Purnell. The video was filmed in the dunes of Newcastle, New South Wales, Australia, featuring Goodrem performing the song among a "circle of mirrored plinths". It showcases visuals that represent the song's "kinetic eclipse of light and shadow".

== Personnel ==
Credits adapted from Tidal.

- Delta Goodrem – lead vocals, songwriting, piano
- Michael Fatkin – production, songwriting, programming, background vocals
- Ferras Alqaisi – songwriting, background vocals, musician, piano
- Jonas Myrin – songwriting, background vocals, musician
- Nicole McLean – background vocals, musician
- Devon Curry – drum kit
- Matthew Copley – guitar, musician
- Pia Salvia – harp, musician
- Leon Zervos – mastering
- Jamie Snell – mixing
- Allison Marin – musician, synth strings
- Antonia Marin – musician, synth strings
- Darryl Beaton – musician, piano
- Kieran Ledwidge – musician, synth strings
- Devon Curry – programming

== Charts ==
Weekly chart performance
Chart (2026)	Peak position
Australia (ARIA)	99
Australia Independent (AIR)	1
Austria (Ö3 Austria Top 40)	28
Finland (Suomen virallinen lista)	44
Greece International (IFPI)	34
Sweden (Sverigetopplistan)	70
Switzerland (Schweizer Hitparade)	70
UK Singles Sales (OCC)	6

== Release history ==
Release history
Date	Format(s)	Version	Label	Ref.
1 March 2026	Music download; music streaming	Original	Atled; Better Now	
3 April 2026	Music download; music streaming	Steve Anderson remix	Atled; Better Now	
