= Flawed (song) =

Single by Delta Goodrem

from the album Innocent Eyes (Japan)
- Released: 11 October 2006
- Recorded: 2006
- Genre: Pop
- Length: 4:21
- Label: Sony Music Japan
- Songwriter(s): Billymann; Delta Goodrem; Christopher Rojas

Delta Goodrem singles chronology
| "Together We Are One" (2006) | "Flawed" (2006) | "In This Life" (2007) |

Music video
- "Flawed" on YouTube

"Flawed" is a song written by Billymann, Delta Goodrem and Christopher Rojas, performed by Delta Goodrem. The song was the first song that Goodrem released in Japan and is taken from the Japanese version of her album Innocent Eyes. It is also featured in the Japanese film Adiantum Blue. In January 2008, "Flawed" re-entered the digital download charts at number 45.

== Charts ==
| Chart (2006) | Peak position |
|---|---|
| Japan Download Chart | 1 |
