= Warrior (Delta Goodrem song) =

2026 single by Delta Goodrem

Single by Delta Goodrem

from the album Pure
- Released: 28 August 2026
- Length: 3:39
- Label: Alted; Universal Music
- Songwriters: Delta Goodrem; Matthew Copley; Geoff Duncan
- Producers: Michael Fatkin; Matthew Copley

Delta Goodrem singles chronology
| "Hologram" (2026) | "Warrior" (2026) | "Telescope" (2026) |

"Warrior" is a song by the Australian singer and songwriter Delta Goodrem, released on 28 August 2026 through Atled and Better Now Records as the third single from Goodrem's eighth studio album, Pure (2027). Upon release, Goodrem said "To me, 'Warrior' is about the strength you collect along the way. You can't change the past, but you can recognise what it taught you and step into the next chapter a little stronger, a little fiercer and hopefully a lot wiser."

== Critical reception ==
Phillipe Blake from The Urbanite called it "a soaring anthem about embracing every chapter of your story and recognising the strength collected along the way. Moving from reflective verses into a defiant, cathartic chorus, the song captures the moment when experience becomes wisdom and vulnerability becomes power."

Tony Cunningham from Gig Shack said "[Warrior] builds from thoughtful piano into a cresting pop anthem about the strength you collect rather than the strength you pretend to have." Adding "'Warrior' feels like the album's thesis statement: honour every version of yourself, hero and frightened alike."

== Charts ==
Weekly chart performance
Peak position
| UK Singles Sales (OCC) | 47 |

== Release history ==
Release history
| Date | Format(s) | Version | Label |
|---|---|---|---|
| 28 August 2026 | Music download; music streaming | Original | Atled; Better Now |
| 23 October 2026 | Music download; music streaming | Orchestral version | Atled; Better Now |
