= Let It Rain (Delta Goodrem song) =

Single by Delta Goodrem
- Released: 6 January 2020
- Recorded: January 2020
- Length: 2:45
- Label: Sony Music
- Songwriter(s): Delta Goodrem; Matthew Copley; Marla Altschuler

Delta Goodrem singles chronology
"Welcome to Earth" (2018)	"Let It Rain" (2020)	"Keep Climbing" (2020)

Music video
- "Let It Rain" on YouTube

"Let It Rain" is a song by Australian singer-songwriter Delta Goodrem, co-written by Goodrem with Matthew Copley and Marla Altschuler. It was released on 6 January 2020 by Sony Music Australia. The song was written in the wake of the devastating 2019–2020 bushfires in Australia. A live, stripped-down version of the song was first uploaded on Goodrem's Instagram page on New Year's Day 2020.

Goodrem recorded a full studio version, with all proceeds of the single to go towards the bushfire relief effort. This version was made available for download on 6 January, and quickly topped the Australian iTunes chart. The song was also a minor hit in Hungary and Scotland. The song has been used by 7 News and the Nine Network to promote fundraising efforts.

== Live performances ==
The song was first performed live as part of Goodrem's set at the internationally televised bushfire benefit concert Fire Fight Australia, and a live recording of the song was included on the charity compilation Artists Unite for Fire Fight: Concert for National Bushfire Relief, which debuted at number one on the ARIA albums chart.

The song was also performed live a few days later on the Today show as part of a special episode broadcast from Lakes Entrance, one of the areas affected by the fires.

== Music video ==
A music video for the song was uploaded to Goodrem's YouTube channel on 8 January. The video was shot in monochrome and shows her performing the song on a grand piano in a large empty recording studio. The video was directed by Goodrem herself.

== Charts ==
Chart performance for "Let It Rain"
Chart (2020)	Peak position
Australia (ARIA)	90
Australia Artist Singles (ARIA)	9
Australia Digital Song Sales (Billboard)	1
Hungary (Single Top 40)	35
Scotland (OCC)	60
UK Singles Downloads (OCC)	51

== Release history ==
List of release dates, showing formats, label, editions and reference
Region	Date	Format(s)	Label	Ref.
Various	6 January 2020	Digital download; streaming	Sony Music Australia	
