= Think About You (Delta Goodrem song) =

Single by Delta Goodrem
- Released: 16 February 2018
- Length: 3:09
- Label: Sony Music
- Songwriters: Delta Goodrem; Julian Bunetta; John Ryan
- Producers: Julian Bunetta; John Ryan

Delta Goodrem singles chronology
| "Vente Pa' Ca" (2016) | "Think About You" (2018) | "Welcome to Earth" (2018) |

Music videos
- "Think About You" on YouTube; "Think About You" (2018) on YouTube

"Think About You" is a song by Australian singer-songwriter Delta Goodrem. It was released on 16 February 2018. The song debuted on the ARIA singles chart at number 32, and later peaked at number 19, becoming Goodrem's 21st top 20 hit in Australia.

Upon release, Goodrem said: "As a songwriter, I look at the message that I want to convey in a song, in this case, and after working on a number of different projects, I genuinely went into the writing session with an open mind that it didn't have to come with as much gravity in the sentiment, it just has to feel good. Every chapter of my career has been different and right now, with this song, I want people to just have fun."

== Promotion ==
The song was teased over the course of several days across Goodrem's social media accounts, with snippets of the song being paired with scenes of Goodrem moving around at a photoshoot. Goodrem also did a performance as part of Channel V's Island Parties series to promote the song. She also did a series of radio interviews on all the major commercial stations around Australia.

== Reception ==
Jamie Velevski from Amnplify said "The upbeat, seductive track puts the songstress into a new spotlight as the use of sensual sounds and soft tones throughout the background are characteristics unseen to the artists' previous work." Adding that "with the team that put together Niall Horan's global hit "Slow Hands", there's no denying that this fresh mature sound for Delta will also make waves." Mike Wass from Idolator called the song "a sexy, uptempo banger."

== Music video ==
On February 16, Goodrem uploaded a video titled "Think About You (The Look Book)" to her Vevo page. It features monochrome footage of her at the photo shoot which produced the cover art for the single. As of 10 November 2019, the video has more than 711, 000 views.

Another music video was filmed in early 2018. Goodrem teased the video on her Instagram with a dance rehearsal video. The video was eventually scrapped for unknown reasons.

Goodrem later uploaded the video to her YouTube channel in April 2022.

== Track listing ==
- CD single / digital download
1. "Think About You" – 3:09
- Olsen Remix
1. "Think About You" – 3:29
- Versions single
1. "Think About You (John Gibbons Remix)" – 3:19
2. "Think About You (Initial Talk Remix)" – 3:35
3. "Think About You (Acoustic)" – 4:04

== Charts ==
| Chart (2018) | Peak position |
|---|---|
| Australia (ARIA) | 19 |
| New Zealand Heatseekers (Recorded Music NZ) | 4 |

== Certifications ==
| Region | Certification | Certified units/sales |
|---|---|---|
| Australia (ARIA) | Gold | 35,000^{‡} |
^{‡} Sales+streaming figures based on certification alone.

== Release history ==
List of release dates, showing formats, label, editions and reference
| Region | Date | Format(s) | Version | Label | Catalogue | Ref. |
|---|---|---|---|---|---|---|
| Australia | 16 February 2018 | Digital download; streaming | Original | Sony Music Australia | 886446949147 | |
| Australia | 23 March 2018 | Digital download; streaming | Olsen remix | Sony Music Australia | —N/a | |
| Australia | 6 April 2018 | CD single | Original | Sony Music Australia | 19075830612 | |
| Australia | 6 April 2018 | CD single; digital download; streaming | Versions single | Sony Music Australia | —N/a | |
