= Only Santa Knows =

Studio album by Delta Goodrem
- Released: 13 November 2020
- Recorded: 2014 and 2020, 2021 (Deluxe)
- Genre: Christmas
- Length: 41:59
- Label: Sony Music
- Producers: Delta Goodrem; Mathew Copley; Michael Hohnen

Delta Goodrem chronology
I Honestly Love You (2018)	Only Santa Knows (2020)	Bridge over Troubled Dreams (2021)

Only Santa Knows is the sixth studio album and the first full-length Christmas album by Australian singer-songwriter Delta Goodrem. It was released on 13 November 2020 through Sony Music Australia. It is Goodrem's second Christmas release, after 2012's Christmas EP. The album includes two original tracks and 11 covers, including "Silent Night" with Gurrumul, which was recorded in 2014 and included on The Spirit of Christmas 2014.

The album was reissued on 19 November 2021 in a deluxe edition format containing four new additional tracks.

== Background ==
While working on an album of original material through 2019 and 2020 (which was later confirmed as her 2021 seventh studio album Bridge over Troubled Dreams), Only Santa Knows was released on 12 November 2020 with no prior announcement. On Twitter, Goodrem stated: "I hope the music brings you joy and puts us all in good spirits regardless of everything going on around us."

Following the surprise release of the album, Goodrem explained that the idea for a Christmas album had begun "midway through the year" and that she "went to storage, grabbed all the Christmas decorations, took them to the studio and started getting into the spirit".

== Reception ==
In a review for Only Santa Knows, website Stack referred to Goodrem as a "traditionalist" and opined that "opening on an uber-haunting version of the already spooky Carol of the Bells, it’s immediately clear Delta Goodrem knows what makes the Christmas classics tick". Thomas Bleach commented "reimagining some Christmas classics through her Delta Goodrem musical lens, she's delivered some very uplifting renditions of "The Little Drummer Boy", "Rudolph the Red-Nosed Reindeer", "White Christmas" and "Santa Claus Is Coming To Town". She even recorded her own version of Joni Mitchell's "River" which over time has become a Christmas cult favourite. But on top of that, she also wrote a brand new Christmas song which embodies the importance of believing during this time of year."

Only Santa Knows debuted on the ARIA Albums Chart at number five, the lowest opening week of Goodrem's career. In its fifth charting week, the album rose to number two.

== Promotion ==
To support the album, Goodrem announced her own Christmas special Christmas with Delta, which aired on Nine Network on 12 December 2020, to a viewership of 380,000. She then did a follow-up in 2021 in Luna Park Melbourne 2021. She did her third concert with tribute to Olivia Newton-John in 2022.

== Track listing ==
Only Santa Knows track listing
No.	Title	Writer(s)	Producer(s)	Length
1.	"Carol of the Bells"	Mykola Dmytrovych Leontovych; Peter J. Wilhousky	Delta Goodrem; Matthew Copley	0:38
2.	"Only Santa Knows"	Goodrem; Copley; Marla Altschuler	Goodrem; Copley	3:04
3.	"The Little Drummer Boy"	Harry Simeone; Henry Onorati; Katherine Kennicott Davis	Goodrem; Copley	3:33
4.	"Have Yourself a Merry Little Christmas"	Hugh Martin; Ralph Blane	Goodrem; Copley	2:58
5.	"Rudolph the Red-Nosed Reindeer"	John Marks	Goodrem; Copley	3:37
6.	"River"	Joni Mitchell	Goodrem; Copley	4:01
7.	"Rockin' Around the Christmas Tree"	Marks	Goodrem; Copley	2:47
8.	"White Christmas"	Irving Berlin	Goodrem; Copley	3:29
9.	"Santa Claus Is Coming to Town"	Haven Gillespie; J.Fred Coots	Goodrem; Copley	4:13
10.	"Deck the Halls"	Nos Galan; Thomas Oliphant	Goodrem; Copley	2:46
11.	"Grown-Up Christmas List"	David Foster; Linda Thompson-Jenner	Goodrem; Copley	3:57
12.	"Silent Night" (featuring Gurrumul)	Franz Xaver Gruber; Joseph Mohr	Michael Hohnen	4:05
13.	"Merry Christmas to You" (featuring Olivia Newton-John)	Goodrem; Copley	Goodrem; Copley	2:45
Total length:				41:49

Only Santa Knows (Deluxe Edition)
No.	Title	Writer(s)	Length
14.	"Christmas (Baby Please Come Home)"	Jeff Barry; Ellie Greenwich; Phil Spector	3.23
15.	"Sleigh Ride"	Leroy Anderson; Mitchell Parish	3.13
16.	"Jingle Bell Rock"	Joe Beal; Jim Boothe	2.23
17.	"Frosty the Snowman"	Walter E. Rollins; Steve Nelson	3.21

== Charts ==
=== Weekly charts ===
Weekly chart performance for Only Santa Knows
Chart (2020–2022)	Peak position
Australian Albums (ARIA)	2

=== Year-end charts ===
Year-end chart performance for Only Santa Knows
Chart (2020)	Position
Australian Albums (ARIA)	50

== Release history ==
List of release dates, showing formats, label and reference
Region	Date	Format	Label	Catalogue	Ref.
Australia	13 November 2020	Streaming; digital download; CD	Sony Music Australia	19439826462	
Australia	11 December 2020	Vinyl	Sony Music Australia	19439826461	
Australia	19 November 2021	CD (Deluxe Edition)	Sony Music Australia	19439946222	
