= Fire Fight Australia =

2020 fundraising benefit concert

- Genre: Pop, Hip-Hop and Rock music
- Dates: 16 February 2020
- Locations: ANZ Stadium, Sydney, Australia
- Years active: 2020
- Attendance: 75,000
- Website: Official website

Fire Fight Australia was a fundraising benefit concert held on Sunday, 16 February 2020, as a means for raising funds for the national bushfire relief following the 2019–20 Australian bushfire season, known as the 'Black Summer'. It was held at ANZ Stadium in Sydney, Australia. It ran for 10 hours and was broadcast live on television by the Seven Network and Foxtel. A related album by various artists, Artists Unite for Fire Fight: Concert for National Bushfire Relief was released by Sony in March.

== Funds raised ==
The event was mainly organised by the Australian music industry spearheaded by Paul Dainty and the TEG Dainty music group. They aimed to keep the overhead costs as low as possible so that as much profit as possible would go the affiliated charities. Almost all of these costs were waived or heavily discounted.

The event raised $9.85 million for bushfire relief.

== Affiliated charities ==
- Rural and Regional fire services in affected states
- Red Cross Disaster Relief and Recovery
- The RSPCA Bushfire Appeal
- Foundation for Rural and Regional Renewal (FRRR)

== Performers and set list ==
- Celeste Barber (MC)
- Lee Kernaghan – "Backroad Nation", "Ute Me", "Where I Wanna Be", "Spirit of the Anzacs"
- Conrad Sewell – "Start Again", "Remind Me", "Changing", "Healing Hands"
- Baker Boy – "Meditjin", "Cool as Hell", "Mr La Di Da Di", "Marryuna"
- Daryl Braithwaite – "As the Days Go By", "One Summer", "The Horses"
- Pete Murray – "Opportunity", "Better Days", "So Beautiful", "Feeler"
- Grinspoon – "Chemical Heart", "Just Ace", "Lost Control", "Hard Act to Follow"
- Jessica Mauboy – "Saturday Night", "Can I Get a Moment?", "Sunday", "We Got Love"
- Illy – "Then What", "Catch 22" (with Thandi Phoenix), "Last Laugh", "Papercuts"
- Guy Sebastian – "Bloodstone", "Before I Go", "Battle Scars", "Choir"
- Peking Duk – "Stranger", "Say My Name", "Take Me Over", "High"
- Delta Goodrem – "I Am Australian", "Born to Try", "Let It Rain", "Sitting on Top of the World", "In This Life", "Lost Without You", "Wings"
- Ronan Keating – "Lovin' Each Day", "When You Say Nothing at All", "Life Is a Rollercoaster"
- Tina Arena – "The Machine's Breaking Down", "Chains", "Heaven Help My Heart", "Boys in Town"
- Alice Cooper – "Department of Youth", "I'm Eighteen", "Poison", "School's Out", "Another Brick in the Wall"
- Amy Shark – "Adore", "All Loved Up", "Mess Her Up", "I Said Hi"
- 5 Seconds of Summer – "She Looks So Perfect", "Easier", "No Shame", "Want You Back", "Youngblood"
- Queen + Adam Lambert – recreated Queen's Live Aid performance with "Bohemian Rhapsody", "Radio Ga Ga", Freddie Mercury's call and response vocal interlude (with footage and audio of Mercury taken from Queen's 1986 live performance at Wembley Stadium on screen), "Hammer to Fall", "Crazy Little Thing Called Love", "We Will Rock You", "We Are the Champions"
- Michael Bublé (live cross from Rod Laver Arena in Melbourne) – "Sway", "Such a Night", "Fly Me to the Moon"
- Hilltop Hoods – "Leave Me Lonely", "Exit Sign" (with Illy, Ecca Vandal), "Clark Griswold" (with Adrian Eagle), "1955" (with Montaigne), "Cosby Sweater"
- k.d. lang – "The Valley", "Hallelujah"
- Icehouse and William Barton – "Great Southern Land", "Electric Blue", "We Can Get Together"
- John Farnham and Olivia Newton-John – "Age of Reason", "Pressure Down", "Two Strong Hearts", "That's Freedom", "You're the Voice" (with Mitch Tambo on vocals, Allan Mackenzie on didgeridoo and Brian May on rhythm guitar)

== Reception ==
The concert was the most watched program of the night on Australia's free to air multi channels and subscription channels, and the fourth most watched program overall, peaking at 4.7 million viewers.

== Artists Unite for Fire Fight ==
Artists Unite for Fire Fight: Concert for National Bushfire Relief

Live album by Various Artists
- Released: 13 March 2020
- Recorded: 16 February 2020
- Venues: ANZ Stadium, Sydney
- Length: 97:00
- Label: Sony Music Australia

A live charity album was released on 13 March 2020 by Sony Music Australia. The album was not released on streaming sites as a way to boost the funds raised. The album debuted at number one on the ARIA albums chart. Audio from Queen + Adam Lambert's setlist were included on their 2020 album Live Around the World

=== Track listing ===
Disc one
No.	Title	Artist	Length
1.	"Ute Me"	Lee Kernaghan	3:12
2.	"Healing Hands"	Conrad Sewell	4:58
3.	"Cool as Hell"	Baker Boy	3:51
4.	"As the Days Go By"	Daryl Braithwaite	5:51
5.	"Feeler"	Pete Murray	4:20
6.	"Chemical Heart"	Grinspoon	4:26
7.	"Saturday Night"	Jessica Mauboy	3:15
8.	"Last Laugh"	Illy	2:29
9.	"Before I Go"	Guy Sebastian	4:07
10.	"High"	Peking Duk feat. The Baroness	3:45
11.	"Let It Rain"	Delta Goodrem	2:38

Disc two
No.	Title	Artist	Length
1.	"When You Say Nothing at All"	Ronan Keating	4:34
2.	"Chains"	Tina Arena	4:35
3.	"School's Out/Another Brick in the Wall Pt. 2"	Alice Cooper	5:30
4.	"I Said Hi"	Amy Shark	3:07
5.	"Youngblood"	5 Seconds of Summer	6:07
6.	"Hammer to Fall"	Queen + Adam Lambert	5:14
7.	"Such a Night"	Michael Bublé	3:21
8.	"1955"	Hilltop Hoods feat. Montaigne	4:11
9.	"Hallelujah"	k.d. lang	5:59
10.	"We Can Get Together"	Icehouse feat. William Barton and Evan Davies	3:51
11.	"Two Strong Hearts"	John Farnham and Olivia Newton-John	3:25
12.	"You're the Voice"	John Farnham with Olivia Newton-John, Mitch Tambo and Brian May	5:17

=== Charts ===
==== Weekly charts ====
Chart (2020)	Peak position
Australian Albums (ARIA)	1

==== Year-end charts ====
Chart (2020)	Position
Australian Albums (ARIA)	29

== See also ==
- Songs for Australia
- Sound Relief
- List of number-one albums of 2020 (Australia)
