= Back to Your Heart =

Single by Delta Goodrem
- Released: 4 August 2023
- Length: 3:16
- Label: ATLED
- Songwriters: Delta Goodrem; John Shanks; Matthew Copley

Delta Goodrem singles chronology
"All of My Friends" (2021)	"Back to Your Heart" (2023)	"Hearts on the Run" (2024)

Music video
- "Back to Your Heart" on YouTube

"Back to Your Heart" is a song by the Australian singer-songwriter Delta Goodrem, co-written by Goodrem with John Shanks and Matthew Copley. It was released to streaming services on 4 August 2023 by Goodrem's own label ATLED Records.

== Background ==
The release of "Back to Your Heart" was announced by Goodrem in July 2023, scheduled for the following month under her own record imprint, ATLED Records.

In an interview with Retro Pop Magazine, Goodrem discussed the conception of her new music, and said "that last album was so intense and heavy; it was me at the piano asking, 'Where do we come from? How did I get here? What do I need to do to heal and work through?'… It was a real deep dive", but that while touring with the Backstreet Boys in 2022 she was "surrounded by so much fun, which gave me a sense of freedom in what I wanted to do now!".

== Critical reception ==
"Back to Your Heart" was positively received upon release, with the Official Charts Company describing the song as "a souring behemoth bursting with early nineties nostalgia" and comparing it to the music of Celine Dion and Tina Turner. Cassandra Green of Marie Claire Australia wrote that the song "brings an 80s energy and is a real belter: the kind of anthem you can’t help but want to sing along to in the car, in the shower and into your hairbrush."

Women in Pop said "The song is an anthemic, uplifting pop-rock track with a classic, addictive ‘na-na-na’ melody that quickly lodges itself in your head. Goodrem's voice is, as always, pure magic as she sings of never giving up and always trust what your heart tells you"

== Chart performance ==
"Back to Your Heart" entered the UK Singles Downloads Chart at number 25 on 11 August 2023.

== Charts ==
Weekly chart performance for "Back to Your Heart"
Chart (2023)	Peak position
Australia Independent (AIR)	1
UK Singles Downloads (OCC)	25

== Release history ==
Release formats for "Back to Your Heart"
Region	Date	Formats	Label	Ref.
Various	4 August 2023	Digital download; streaming	ATLED	
