= Welcome to Earth (song) =

Single by Delta Goodrem
- Released: 5 April 2018
- Length: 3:57
- Label: Sony Music
- Songwriter(s): Delta Goodrem; Stuart Crichton; David Hodges; Vince Pizzinga

Delta Goodrem singles chronology
| "Think About You" (2018) | "Welcome to Earth" (2018) | "Let It Rain" (2020) |

Audio video
- "Welcome to Earth" on YouTube

"Welcome to Earth" is a song written by Delta Goodrem, Stuart Crichton, David Hodges and Vince Pizzinga and recorded by Australian singer-songwriter Delta Goodrem. The song was first performed live during the Opening ceremony of the 2018 Commonwealth Games in Gold Coast as official theme of the games. Goodrem wore a custom-made outfit designed by Zian Couture, and was supported by 15 drummers and a 72-piece choir. Immediately following the performance, Goodrem wrote on Twitter: "What an incredible feeling performing at the Opening Ceremony of the 2018 Gold Coast #CommonwealthGames! Truly honoured."

Goodrem said "Sport, like music is so unifying. "Welcome to Earth" is my way of paying tribute to all the athletes and hopefully it resonates with people from wherever they are in the world."

It's the second time Goodrem has performed the Commonwealth Games anthem; she previously performed "Together We Are One" at the 2006 Commonwealth Games in Melbourne.

The song was released on 5 April 2018.

== Release history ==
List of release dates, showing formats, label, editions and reference
| Region | Date | Format(s) | Label | Ref. |
|---|---|---|---|---|
| Various | 5 April 2018 | Digital download; streaming | Sony Music Australia | |
| Australia | 13 April 2018 | CD single | Sony Music Australia | |
