= Shirley and Johnny =

- Origin: High Wycombe
- Genres: Pop
- Labels: Parlophone
- Members: Shirley Bagnall; Johnny Wheeler

Shirley Bagnall and Johnny Wheeler were an English pop duo of the 1960s and 1970s from High Wycombe. They were signed by Parlophone and their debut single, "I Don't Want To Know" (1964) reached number 47 in the Melody Maker chart. They appeared on Rediffusion's Ollie & Fred's Five O'Clock Club in June 1965. plus many other television and radio shows. During 1970, whilst working on a cruise ship RHMS Amerikanis, S&J formed a trio with Australian musician Mel James.

Upon their return to the UK in 1971 they began to record as Wheeler St. James & James (later shortened to Wheeler St. James). Shirley and Johnny made their final record in 1977.

== Discography ==
=== Singles ===
- "I Don't Want To Know" / B: "It Must Be Love" Parlophone June 1964
- "Only Once" / B: "Make Me An Offer" Parlophone Feb 1965
- "Day Dreamin' Of You" / B: "Till You Say You'll Be Mine" Parlophone Aug 1965
- "I'm Sorry" / B: "Breakaway" Parlophone Feb 1966
- "And I Don't Want Your Love" / B: "There Go The Heartaches" Parlophone Sep 1967
- "All The Time In The World" / B: "One Man Band" Mercury Aug 1968
- "Don't Make Me Over" / B: "Baby, Baby, Baby" Mercury Feb 1969
- "Just Say Goodbye" / B: "The Sunshine After The Rain" Aug 1969
- "Forever Is A Long Long Time" / B: "Just For Fun" Philips Dec 1969
- "Chapel Of Love" / B: "The One Who Loves Me" Decca Feb 1977

Cheep Boots - Single

- "Baby Do I Need You" / "Come and Stay with Me" Fontana 1970 (Johnny sang on the A Side) Written and co-produced by Dave Dee and P. Mason.

Wheeler St. James - Singles

- "My Impersonal Life" / "Lovely to See You" RCA May 1972
- "I Like Your Music" / "Help Me Now" Philips September 1973
- "Touch the Wind" / "Listen to Me" April 1974

=== Album ===
This Is Shirley and Johnny, Philips 1970

- Track list
  - "Don't Make Me Over"
  - "One Man Band"
  - "Forever Is A Long, Long Time"
  - "Hey, You, Wait, Stay"
  - "Lady Fingers"
  - "I Can't Make It Alone"
  - "River Deep, Mountain High"
  - "Rivers Of Your Mind"
  - "Gli Occhi Miei"
  - "Make It Easy on Yourself"
  - "Baby, Baby, Baby"
  - "Just Say Goodbye"
