= Bridge over Troubled Dreams =

Studio album by Delta Goodrem
- Released: 14 May 2021
- Genres: Adult contemporary; chamber pop; pop; soft rock
- Length: 43:06
- Label: Sony Music
- Producers: Matthew Copley; Delta Goodrem; Mark Rankin

Delta Goodrem chronology
Only Santa Knows (2020)	Bridge over Troubled Dreams (2021)	Pure (2026)

Singles from Bridge over Troubled Dreams
- 1. "Keep Climbing" Released: 14 May 2020; 2. "Paralyzed" Released: 17 July 2020; 3. "Solid Gold" Released: 18 September 2020; 4. "Billionaire" Released: 19 March 2021; 5. "All of My Friends" Released: 23 April 2021

Bridge over Troubled Dreams is the seventh studio album by Australian singer-songwriter Delta Goodrem. It was released on 14 May 2021 and served as Goodrem's first album of all-new original material since Wings of the Wild (2016). The album was preceded by the singles "Keep Climbing", "Paralyzed", "Solid Gold", "Billionaire" and "All of My Friends".

The album debuted at number one in Australia, becoming Goodrem's fifth number-one album. In doing so, Goodrem now draws equal second with Kasey Chambers for most number ones on the ARIA Albums Chart by a local female solo artist, with Kylie Minogue (with eight) having the most.

To support the album, Goodrem embarked on the Bridge over Troubled Dreams Tour in 2022, touring across Australia, as well as her first ever international tour dates in London and Berlin. It also had an accompanying book

== Background ==
Planning for Bridge over Troubled Dreams can be seen to have originally dated back to 2018 with the release of "Think About You". The song indicated a change in sound and direction for Goodrem. However, Goodrem has since explained that she later opted for a return to the piano-based ballad pop of her debut album, Innocent Eyes, stating that she had "not tried to chase a sound and this album and body of work is me being my authentic self musically. In creating this album, I wanted to hear all the songs with live musicians. Every song I started at the piano. Every instrument is recorded live and there is a cohesive sound that has been captured".

In December 2019, Goodrem announced she was "living in a music bubble", working on her then-sixth studio album, and officially marked the beginning of the new era with the release of "Keep Climbing", serving as the lead single for her seventh album. The song was globally premiered as part of Goodrem's seventh instalment of The Bunkerdown Sessions which she had carried out weekly throughout lockdown. A motivational piano ballad, Goodrem explained that her intention behind the song was to remind people to not be afraid to find the strength when they feel stuck between where they are and where they want to go”.

On 17 July 2020, Goodrem released the album's second official single, "Paralyzed". Lyrically, Goodrem explained the song to be a "narrative of when your whole world stops and has to be reset"; and described the album upon the release of "Paralyzed" to be "a nod to [my old stuff] sonically speaking in terms of what I was listening to, and getting re-inspired by", further adding "I needed to kind of go back to what I used to do. I had to give myself the freedom to be a little eccentric again. With some of the other songs on the new record, I definitely allowed myself to change tempos; to not have a structure. And at the same time, to have hopefully enough catchiness for somebody to still grab hold of it. There's definitely still both sides of the coin."

In an interview with Grazia, Goodrem referred to the album as her "first 'woman' record", further explaining "my next album has really been about being transparent and finding that part of me that wants to be my authentic self at all times. The album is incredibly personal, raw and honest. I have opened up and shared stories that I have not shared before and people have really resonated to the transparency and vulnerability. I just want to make good music for people to have as soundtracks to their own lives." Delta went onto say inspiration for the album came from the concept of "home" and wanting to be more literal. She was also inspired by a photograph of Patti Smith.

Planned for release in 2020 as her sixth studio album, Goodrem then released Christmas album Only Santa Knows in November of that year with no prior announcement. Four months after the release of Only Santa Knows, Goodrem revealed that Bridge over Troubled Dreams would be released on 14 May 2021. The six-month gap between the release of the two albums marks the shortest time between albums of Goodrem's career.

== Critical reception ==
Professional ratings
Review scores
Source	Rating
Retro Pop Magazine	4/5 stars
auspOp	5/5 stars

In a positive review of the album, Retro Pop Magazine described the album as Goodrem's "most accomplished effort yet", and "a collection of tracks that look inward and share her most personal stories with the world"; highlighting "Everyone's Famous" as "an exploration of the nature of fame and the challenges it presents" and the "musings on the impact of success on close relationships" of "All of My Friends".

David from auspOp said "It's rare for an artist to let you in so deeply on each song and is a testament to how transparent she's being this album. It's all Delta and it's stunning".

Stack noted that Bridge over Troubled Dreams "successfully veer[s] from pop to ballads, gospel and even a country-tinged detour", and that the album's themes include "fame, fear and failing to live up to expectations".

== Commercial performance ==
Bridge over Troubled Dreams debuted on the Australian ARIA Album Chart at number-one; her fifth to do so and the eighth by an Australian artist in 2021. In its second charting week, the album dropped to number-nine; and rose to number-eight in its third.

In the UK, the album debuted at twenty-five on the UK Album Downloads Chart, rising to twenty-two in its second week.

The album was also supported by an National tour of Australia in March/April 2022, with a New Zealand leg being cancelled due to covid restrictions. She took the tour to Europe for sold-out shows in the UK and Germany in October 2022.

== Track listing ==
All tracks are produced by Delta Goodrem, Mark Rankin, and Matthew Copley, except "The Power", produced by Goodrem and Copley.

Bridge over Troubled Dreams track listing
No.	Title	Writer(s)	Length
1.	"Keep Climbing"	Delta Goodrem; Matthew Copley; Sebastian Kole	3:38
2.	"Everyone's Famous"	Goodrem; Marla Altschuler	4:09
3.	"Solid Gold"	Goodrem; Copley; Altschuler	4:08
4.	"Dear Elton"	Goodrem; Altschuler	4:21
5.	"Billionaire"	Goodrem; Copley; Altschuler	4:14
6.	"Paralyzed"	Goodrem; Altschuler	4:18
7.	"All of My Friends"	Goodrem; Amy Wadge	3:13
8.	"Kill Them with Kindness"	Goodrem; Copley; Altschuler	3:25
9.	"Crash"	Goodrem; Altschuler	3:11
10.	"The Power"	Goodrem; Copley; Altschuler	3:47
11.	"Play"	Goodrem; Copley; Anthony Egizii; David Musumeci; Vince Pizzinga; Audius Mtawarira; Alan Watts	4:42
Total length:			43:06

== Personnel ==
=== Musicians ===
- Delta Goodrem – lead vocals, piano (all tracks); background vocals (3, 4, 6, 11), writer (all), concept
- Matthew Copley – guitar (1–6, 8–11), background vocals (3, 4, 6, 11); bass guitar, percussion (11), writer(1, 3, 5, 8, 10, 11), concept
- Marla Altschuler – background vocals (3, 4, 6), writer (2–6, 8–10), concept
- Ian Burdge – cello (1, 2, 4, 5, 7–11)
- The Trilogy Group – choir vocals (1, 3, 5, 8–10)
- Tony Jones – choir vocals (1, 3, 5, 8–10)
- Aaron Sterling – drums (1–4, 6, 8)
- Sally Herbert – strings (1, 2, 4, 5, 7, 10), violin (1, 2, 4, 7, 10)
- Sean Hurley – bass guitar (2–6)
- Sister 2 Sister School of Singing – choir vocals (2–4)
- Matt Chamberlain – drums (5, 9)
- Rachel Robson – viola (5, 6, 8, 9, 11)
- Calina de la Mare – violin (5, 6, 8, 9, 11)
- Julia Singleton – violin (5, 6, 8, 9, 11)
- Richard George – violin (5, 6, 8, 9, 11)
- Tom Pigott Smith – violin (5, 6, 8, 9, 11)
- Luke Davison – drums (10)
- Amy Wadge - writer (7)
- Sebastion Cole - writer (1)
- DNA Songs - writer (11)
- Vince Pizzinga- writer (11)
- Audius Mtawarira - writer (11)
- Alan Watts - writer / sample (11)

=== Technical ===
- Leon Zervos – mastering engineer
- Mark Rankin – mixing engineer (1–9, 11)
- Miles Walker – mixing engineer (10)
- Tom Garnett – recording engineer (6, 8–11)
- Lewis Mitchell – recording engineer (3, 5)
- Wesley Seidman – assistant engineer (1–7)

== Charts ==
=== Weekly charts ===
Chart performance for Bridge over Troubled Dreams
Chart (2021)	Peak position
Australian Albums (ARIA)	1
UK Album Downloads (Official Charts)	22

=== Year-end charts ===
Chart (2021)	Position
Australian Artist Albums (ARIA)	16

== Bridge over Troubled Dreams Tour ==
Bridge over Troubled Dreams Tour
- Tour by Delta Goodrem
- Associated album: Bridge over Troubled Dreams
- Start date: 12 March 2022
- End date: 19 October 2022
- Legs: 2
- No. of shows: 13

Delta Goodrem concert chronology
- Wings of the Wild Tour (2016); Bridge over Troubled Dreams Tour (2022); Hearts On the Run Tour (2023)

In support of Bridge over Troubled Dreams, Goodrem embarked on her fifth concert tour of Australia and her first to include international dates. Originally scheduled to occur in 2021, it was postponed twice due to the COVID-19 pandemic, and eventually took place in March and April 2022. Following the Australian leg, Goodrem added shows in London and Berlin – her first ever international tour dates – and these sold out.

=== Set list ===
The following set list is not representative of all tour dates.

1. "The Power"
2. "Lost Without You"
3. "Billionaire"
4. "The River"
5. "Innocent Eyes"
6. "Crash" / "Dear Life"
7. "In This Life"
8. "Keep Climbing"
9. "Sitting on Top of the World"
10. "I'm Still Standing" / "Dear Elton"
11. "Out of the Blue"
12. "The Show Must Go On"
13. "Predictable"
14. "Solid Gold"
15. "It's Raining Men"
16. "Think About You"
17. "Kill Them With Kindness" / "Higher Love"
18. "Not Me, Not I" / "Survivor"
19. "Paralyzed"
20. "Almost Here"
21. "Wings"
22. "Play"
23. "Born to Try"

=== Tour dates ===
Date	City	Country	Venue
Leg 1
12 March 2022	Brisbane	Australia	Brisbane Entertainment Centre
14 March 2022	Gold Coast	Australia	Gold Coast Convention and Exhibition Centre
18 March 2021	Canberra	Australia	National Convention Centre
19 March 2022	Wollongong	Australia	Wollongong Entertainment Centre
22 March 2022	Perth	Australia	RAC Arena
25 March 2022	Adelaide	Australia	Adelaide Entertainment Centre
26 March 2022	Melbourne	Australia	Rod Laver Arena
5 April 2022	Townsville	Australia	Townsville Entertainment Centre
8 April 2022	Newcastle	Australia	Newcastle Entertainment Centre
9 April 2022	Sydney	Australia	Sydney SuperDome
Leg 2
12 October 2022	London	England	Lafayette
15 October 2022	London	England	Lafayette
19 October 2022	Berlin	Germany	Privatclub
