= Keep Climbing =

Single by Delta Goodrem

from the album Bridge over Troubled Dreams
- Released: 14 May 2020
- Length: 3:40
- Label: Sony Music
- Songwriter(s): Delta Goodrem; Matthew Copley; Sebastian Kole
- Producer(s): Delta Goodrem; Matthew Copley; Mark Rankin

Delta Goodrem singles chronology
"Let It Rain" (2020)	"Keep Climbing" (2020)	"Paralyzed" (2020)

Lyric video
- "Keep Climbing" on YouTube

"Keep Climbing" is a song by Australian singer-songwriter Delta Goodrem, co-written by Goodrem with Matthew Copley and Sebastian Kole. It was released to streaming services on 14 May 2020 by Sony Music Australia. The song is a motivational piano-led power ballad about hope and overcoming hardship.

== Background ==
The song was first teased in an advert for the Nine Network drama Doctor Doctor on 25 April, initially titled "Bridge Over Troubled Dreams". On 14 May, Goodrem premiered the song during a livestream on Facebook and Instagram, and released it on streaming services immediately after.

The song was included as a B-side on the CD edition of Goodrem's follow-up single "Paralyzed".

== Reception ==
"Keep Climbing" was positively received by critics upon its release, with Idolator remarking that the song provides "the kind of stripped-back, vocal showcase that Delta has perfected since breaking through with "Born To Try" and "Lost Without You" in 2002" and that it "might just be her best single since "Wings"". Thomas Bleach commented "beginning with just simple piano keys, she starts to add layers with strings and soulful melodies that turn into a beautiful gospel moment towards the end of the song where the choir powerfully sings the phrase "keep climbing"", and that "the song ripples with perfect waves of emotions that drive the structure and climatically builds to give you a really beautiful and special moment."

== Videos ==
A lyric video for the song was uploaded to YouTube at the time of release. The video features the lyrics appearing above an aerial shot of a piano, on which Goodrem is playing the piano part for the song.

A live performance recorded at the NSW Art Gallery was released on May 23, while a studio recording video was released on June 15.

== Track listing ==
Digital download
No.	Title	Length
1.	"Keep Climbing"	3:40

== Charts ==
Chart (2020)	Peak position
Australia Digital Song Sales (Billboard)	6

== Release history ==
Release formats for "Keep Climbing"
Region	Date	Formats	Label	Ref.
Various	14 May 2020	Digital download; streaming	Sony Music Australia	
Australia	15 May 2020	Contemporary hit radio	Sony Music Australia	
