= Innocent Eyes (2006 Delta Goodrem album) =

Compilation album by Delta Goodrem
- Released: 11 October 2006
- Genre: Pop rock
- Length: 52:43
- Label: Sony Music Japan

Delta Goodrem chronology
| Mistaken Identity (2004) | Innocent Eyes (2006) | Delta (2007) |

Singles from Innocent Eyes
- 1. "Flawed" Released: 11 October 2006

Innocent Eyes is a compilation album by Australian singer-songwriter Delta Goodrem, released only in Japan on 11 October 2006 through Sony Music Japan. The album comprises songs from her first two studio albums, Innocent Eyes and Mistaken Identity, as well as two new songs: "Never Fades Away" and "Flawed", which was released as a single.

== Background and release ==
In an attempt to break the singer in America, an album composed of tracks from her first two albums—some remixed—plus one new song was readied for release. In advance of the album, "Lost Without You" was released as a single, peaking at number eighteen on the US Billboard Adult Contemporary chart.

Originally scheduled for November 2005, the album's release was pushed back numerous times. The project was eventually shelved in the US but an altered version with an additional new song came out in Japan on 11 October 2006 as Innocent Eyes. The first single, "Flawed", became a hit on the Japanese digital download chart and was featured in the Japanese film Adiantum Blue.

== Commercial performance ==
The album debuted on the charts at number thirty-three, selling 4,000 copies. In its fifth week it peaked at number nineteen with total sales of 23,758. The album went to number eight on the Japanese International album chart with total sales of 46,445. After the Japanese release of "In This Life" in January 2008, Innocent Eyes re-entered the Japanese charts, appearing at number 5 on the digital albums chart and at number 25 on the overall albums chart.

== Track listing ==
Innocent Eyes track listing
| No. | Title | Writer(s) | Length |
|---|---|---|---|
| 1. | "Born to Try" | Goodrem, Audius Mtawarira | 4:15 |
| 2. | "Lost Without You" | Matthew Gerrard, Bridget Benenate | 4:10 |
| 3. | "A Little Too Late" | Goodrem, Gary Barlow, Elliot Kennedy | 3:31 |
| 4. | "Last Night on Earth" | Goodrem, billymann, Christopher Rojas | 4:10 |
| 5. | "Flawed" | Billyman, Goodrem, Rojas | 4:27 |
| 6. | "Almost Here" (Duet with Brian McFadden) | Brian McFadden, Paul Barry, Mark Taylor | 3:51 |
| 7. | "Extraordinary Day" | Goodrem, Vince Pizzinga | 4:17 |
| 8. | "Innocent Eyes" | Goodrem, Vince Pizzinga | 3:54 |
| 9. | "Not Me, Not I" | Goodrem, Kara DioGuardi, Gary Barlow, Eliot Kennedy, Jarrad Rogers | 4:27 |
| 10. | "Never Fades Away" | Bridget Benenate, Matthew Gerrard, Goodrem | 3:36 |
| 11. | "Predictable" | Goodrem, Kara DioGuardi, Rogers | 3:40 |
| 12. | "My Big Mistake" | Goodrem | 3:44 |
| 13. | "Be Strong" | Benenate, Gerrard, Goodrem | 4:03 |
| 14. | "Out of the Blue" | Guy Chambers, Goodrem | 4:23 |

== Charts ==
Chart performance for Innocent Eyes
| Chart (2006) | Peak position |
|---|---|
| Japanese Albums (Oricon) | 19 |

== Sales ==
Sales for Innocent Eyes
| Country | Sales |
|---|---|
| Japan | 46,445 |
