= Solid Gold (Delta Goodrem song) =

Song by Delta Goodrem

Single by Delta Goodrem

from the album Bridge over Troubled Dreams
- Released: 18 September 2020
- Length: 4:07
- Label: Sony Music
- Songwriters: Delta Goodrem; Matthew Copley; Marla Altschuler
- Producers: Goodrem; Copley; Mark Rankin

Delta Goodrem singles chronology
"Paralyzed" (2020)	"Solid Gold" (2020)	"Billionaire" (2021)

Music video
- "Solid Gold" on YouTube

"Solid Gold" is a song by Australian singer-songwriter Delta Goodrem, released on 18 September 2020. An acoustic version and remixes were released in October 2020.

== Background and composition ==
In an interview with Grazia on the day of "Solid Gold"'s release, Goodrem described the song as an "empowering song about reminding someone of your worth and strength; a song you sing along to with your mates and jam out to in the car with all the windows down", and that "every instrument was recorded live and we really wanted to capture that upbeat, fun, retro sound, but with a modern feel." She also stated "at the very core, 'Solid Gold' is an uplifting and empowering message reminding someone who has taken you for granted of your worth and strength".

== Reception ==
Jessica Over wrote for NME that "Solid Gold" "features rich instrumentation and an upbeat melody in a glimpse of what to expect from Goodrem's currently untitled upcoming LP." Australian entertainment website Scenestr described it "fun, upbeat, fierce anthem", and TotalNtertainment noted that the song "[draws] upon rich nostalgic tones similar to Fleetwood Mac", and that "'Solid Gold' instantly ignites a sense of joy through live instruments and a swirling harmonic chorus, making it impossible not to feel good."

== Track listing ==
Digital download
No.	Title	Length
1.	"Solid Gold"	4:07

Digital download
No.	Title	Length
1.	"Solid Gold" (Acoustic)	3:50

Digital download
No.	Title	Length
1.	"Solid Gold" (Quinn remix)	3:15
2.	"Solid Gold" (Initial talk remix)	4:03
