= Paralyzed (Delta Goodrem song) =

2020 Delta Goodrem song

Single by Delta Goodrem

from the album Bridge over Troubled Dreams
- B-side: "Keep Climbing"; "Back in 84"
- Released: 17 July 2020
- Genre: Soft rock; pop
- Length: 4:17
- Label: Sony Music
- Songwriters: Delta Goodrem; Marla Altschuler
- Producers: Delta Goodrem; Matthew Copley; Mark Rankin

Delta Goodrem singles chronology
"Keep Climbing" (2020)	"Paralyzed" (2020)	"Solid Gold" (2020)

Music video
- "Paralyzed" on YouTube

"Paralyzed" is a song by Australian singer-songwriter Delta Goodrem, co-written by Goodrem with Marla Altschuler. It was released on 17 July 2020 by Sony Music Australia.

== Background ==
Goodrem teased the song on her social media a few days prior to release. The song was released on 17 July 2020. Goodrem has said the song is "a narrative of when your whole world stops and has to be reset. It's a personal song, but it's there for everyone who is asking themselves for patience and a chance to stop and rewind."

On 16 August 2020, Goodrem released a six-minute video detailing the back story behind her song "Paralyzed". In the video, she revealed that after having her salivary gland removed, she faced serious complications that led to the paralysis of a nerve in her tongue, which left her having to re-learn to speak again.

== Composition ==
"Paralyzed" is a pop and soft rock ballad, described by website Junkee as having "a distinct throwback quality. Not only to the music of the ’60s – Goodrem singles out "Paralyzed" as having a Beatles-esque sound mixed into the production – but to the early days of her own career".

== Critical reception ==
A review of "Paralyzed" by website Idolator described the song as "a mid-tempo moment that showcases her vocal prowess", and that "off the strength of the first two singles, the "Lost Without You" hitmaker's new album is shaping up to be one of her best. She's certainly playing to her strengths (i.e. that voice)".

== Promotion ==
Goodrem did a number of radio interviews and live performances to promote the song. The song was performed on the season 9 grand final of The Voice Australia, as well as special stripped down performances for Sky News Australia and SiriusXM. The song is also set to be performed on Goodrem's upcoming Bridge over Troubled Dreams Tour.

Goodrem faced heavy backlash in late July after appearing on Sky News Australia alongside controversial journalist Alan Jones to promote the song. Jones has previously been criticised for a number of racist and sexist comments while acting as a radio host for 2GB.

== Music video ==
On July 17, 2020, a lyric video was uploaded to Goodrem's YouTube channel. The video features lyrics displayed in black and white on several different buildings and objects. As the bridge comes in, the footage slowly begins to fade into colour. As of May 2026, the video has over 240,000 views.

On August 6, Goodrem teased the song's official music video on social media, and it was officially released the next day. As of May 2026, the video has received over 1 Million views. The video takes place on the set of a fictional 1970's-style variety show called "The Delta Show". The video consists of Goodrem performing the song with her band at different parts of the show's set, while also showing closeups of many of the crew members. She begins her performance at her piano in a fringed blue jacket, before moving over to a lit up purple stage. At the end of the video the whole band is seen performing on a white set filled with balloons, while Goodrem is now dressed in a white suit covered in rhinestones. The video was directed by Nick Waterman.

== Track listing ==
Digital download
No.	Title	Length
1.	"Paralyzed"	4:17

CD single
No.	Title	Length
1.	"Paralyzed"	4:17
2.	"Keep Climbing"	3:40
3.	"Back in 84"	3:43

== Charts ==
Weekly chart performance for "Paralyzed"
Chart (2020)	Peak position
Australia (ARIA)	36
Australia Artist Singles (ARIA)	2
Australia Digital Song Sales (Billboard)	2
Hungary (Single Top 40)	37
UK Singles Downloads (Official Charts)	87
UK Singles Sales (Official Charts Company)	91

== Release history ==
Release dates and formats for "Paralyzed"
Region	Date	Formats	Label	Ref.
Various	17 July 2020	Digital download; streaming	Sony Music Australia	
Various	21 August 2020	CD single	Sony Music Australia	
