= Shooting Star (Rachael Leahcar album) =

Studio album by Rachael Leahcar
- Released: 13 July 2012
- Recorded: 2012
- Genre: Pop
- Length: 31:52
- Label: Universal
- Producer: Eric J Dubowsky

Rachael Leahcar chronology
Rachael Leahcar (2010)	Shooting Star (2012)	Romantique (2013)

Singles from Rachael Leahcar
- 1. "Coming Home Again" Released: 29 June 2012

Shooting Star is the debut studio album by Australian recording artist Rachael Leahcar, who finished third on the first season of The Voice Australia. The album was released on 13 July 2012, through Universal Music Australia. It features songs Leahcar performed on The Voice, two original songs, as well as newly recorded covers. Leahcar promoted the album with an in-store appearance at Westfield Marion in Oaklands Park, South Australia, where she signed copies of the album and performed the songs "La Vie en rose" and "Shooting Star". The album debuted at number five on the ARIA Albums Chart.

== Background ==
After finishing third in the first season of The Voice Australia in 2012, Leahcar signed a recording contract with Universal Music Australia. On 26 June 2012 it was announced that Leahcar would be releasing their debut studio albums on the 13 July 2012 along with Darren Percival and Sarah De Bono.

== Release and promotion ==
=== Singles ===
The album's lead single "Coming Home Again" was released on 29 June 2012. It was written by Jud Friedman, Allan Rich and Marco Marinangeli. It was originally going to be Leahcar's winners single.

=== Tour ===
In November 2013 Leahcar supported her Coach on The Voice Delta Goodrem as her opening act on Goodrem's album launch tour An Evening with Delta: The Top of My World Shows. This tour was supporting the release of Goodrem's 4th studio album Child of the Universe. The tour commenced in Brisbane on 27 October 2012 and concluded in Melbourne on 8 November 2012.

== Track listing ==
No.	Title	Writer(s)	Length
1.	"La Vie en rose"	Louiguy	2:37
2.	"Over the Rainbow"	E.Y. Harburg; Harold Arlen	2:54
3.	"Hands"	Jewel Kilcher; Patrick Leonard	3:53
4.	"Someone to Watch Over Me"	George Gershwin; Ira Gershwin	3:03
5.	"Nights in White Satin (Notte Di Luce)"	Justin Hayward	3:37
6.	"Smile"	John Turner; Geoffrey Parsons	2:46
7.	"Shooting Star"	Rachael Leahcar	2:15
8.	"Coming Home Again"	Jud Friedman; Allan Rich; Marco Marinangeli	4:27
9.	"The Rose"	Amanda McBroom	3:29
10.	"Words"	Barry Gibb; Robin Gibb; Maurice Gibb	2:56
Total length:			31:52

== Charts ==
=== Weekly charts ===
Chart (2012)	Peak position
Australian Albums (ARIA)	5

=== Year-end charts ===
Chart (2012)	Rank
Australian Artist Albums Chart	37

== Release history ==
Region	Date	Format	Label
Australia	13 July 2012	CD, digital download	Universal Music Australia
