= Wish You Were Here (Delta Goodrem song) =

Single by Delta Goodrem

from the album Child of the Universe
- B-side: "Rise"; "Daughter"
- Released: 12 October 2012
- Recorded: 2012
- Genre: Soft rock; adult contemporary
- Length: 4:38
- Label: Sony
- Songwriters: Delta Goodrem; Gary Clark
- Producer: Gary Clark

Delta Goodrem singles chronology
"Dancing with a Broken Heart" (2012)	"Wish You Were Here" (2012)	"Bayini" (2013)

Music video
- "Wish You Were Here" on YouTube

"Wish You Were Here" is a song by Australian singer–songwriter Delta Goodrem. It was sent to Australian radio on 4 October 2012, and was released digitally on 12 October 2012 and as a CD single on 19 October 2012. The song is the third single released from Goodrem's fourth studio album Child of the Universe.

== Background and composition ==
"I hope this song means something to others that have been through the pain of losing someone special. It’s about keeping the memory alive and honouring a life lost. Writing this song has been very therapeutic in helping me grieve for my friend. I still think about him every day."

— Goodrem expressing her hope about the song.

In July 2009, one of Goodrem's lifelong friends, Liam O'Flaherty, was involved in a motorbike accident which took his life. Goodrem was very devastated upon learning the death of O'Flaherty, who was only 24 when he died. While writing materials for her upcoming album, Goodrem worked with Gary Clark and wrote "Wish You Were Here" as a tribute to remember O'Flaherty. During the single's press release, Delta opened up about the genesis of the song, stating

"I tried a million different ways to write this song. I had to have a song about this moment in my life of losing one of my best friends. Then on his actual birthday, it was two years later, I said I’m not leaving this day without having the song about it. You can try a million ways, I wrote probably 20 songs about it, and then on his actual birthday, I wrote this song."

In an interview with PopSugar, Goodrem admitted that "Wish You Were Here" was one of the best songs that she has ever written. Lyrically, the song narrates about the feelings and emotions Goodrem was feeling when she found out about the accident that killed him and her struggles to move on.

== Critical reception ==
In a positive review from the website Spotlight Report, the track was labelled as an "amazing song on so many levels. Musically, it soars from Delta sitting alone at the piano, to a symphony of strings and voices. Delta delivers a dynamic, unique and breathtaking vocal performance – it's the singer in spine-tingling full voice."

== Promotion ==
=== Music video ===
A preview of the music video premiered on A Current Affair on 5 October 2012. It was directed by Ryan Pallotta and was officially released on 16 October 2012.

=== Live performances ===
"Wish You Were Here" was performed live many times before being released. It had live performances at a Nova and Mix FM Intimate Acoustic concert for fans. It also was performed in stores for "Dancing with a Broken Heart". Goodrem appeared on the Today Show to promote the song and on A Current Affair on 26 October 2012 to promote the album, performing "Wish You Were Here". On 28 October 2012, she performed the song, as well as "Sitting on Top of the World" at a Guerilla Gig, filmed by pay TV music network Channel (V) at Broadbeach Mall. Goodrem later performed the song on New Zealand's Got Talent. In November, she appeared on television show Mornings to sing "Wish You Were Here".

== Track listings ==
- Digital download
1. "Wish You Were Here" (radio edit) – 4:15
- CD single / digital EP
1. "Wish You Were Here" – 4:38
2. "Rise" (Delta Goodrem, John Shanks, Ali Tamposi) – 4:04
3. "Daughter" (Delta Goodrem, Gary Clark, Vince Pizzinga) – 4:02
4. "Sitting on Top of the World" (Stuart Crichton remix) – 3:31

== Chart performance ==
"Wish You Were here" debuted at number seven on the ARIA Singles Chart before peaking at number five in its second week on the chart. It was certified platinum by the Australian Recording Industry Association (ARIA) for shipments of 70,000 copies.

=== Weekly charts ===
Chart (2012)	Peak position
Australia (ARIA)	5

=== Year-end charts ===
Chart (2012)	Position
Australian Artists Singles (ARIA)	22

== Certifications ==
Region	Certification	Certified units/sales
Australia (ARIA)	Platinum	70,000^{^}
^{^} Shipments figures based on certification alone.

== Release history ==
Country	Date	Label	Format
Australia	4 October 2012	Sony Music Entertainment	Airplay
Australia	12 October 2012	Sony Music Entertainment	Digital download
Australia	19 October 2012	Sony Music Entertainment	CD single
New Zealand	12 October 2012	Sony Music Entertainment	Digital download
