= Here Comes the Sun (Rachael Leahcar album) =

Studio album by Rachael Leahcar
- Released: 11 April 2014
- Recorded: 2014
- Genre: Pop
- Length: 43:14
- Label: Universal Music Australia

Rachael Leahcar chronology
Romantique (2013)	Here Comes the Sun (2014)	Shadows (2017)

Here Comes the Sun is the third studio album by Australian recording artist Rachael Leahcar. The album was released on 11 April 2014, through Universal Music Australia. The album, a collection of Beatles covers, was announced on March 31, 2014 Leahcar described the album as “really special”.

== Background ==
The idea for the album came about when Leahcar's record label, Universal, asked if she would be interested in doing a concept album. According to Leahcar, the album was "quite last minute" and was completed in just a few weeks. In addition to the songs featured on the album, Leahcar revealed she had also recorded other Beatles songs including, "The Fool on the Hill", "If I Fell", and "Dear Prudence", but they were ultimately cut. "Norwegian Wood" was also cut from the album due to the lyrical content. Leahcar explained, "I didn't think it was really 'me' to sing it"!

Leahcar's version of "Across the Universe" also appears on Then & Now: Australia Salutes The Beatles, a compilation album celebrating 50 years since The Beatles first came to Australia.

== Track listing ==
No.	Title	Writer(s)	Length
1.	"Golden Slumbers/Here Comes the Sun" (from Abbey Road)	Lennon–McCartney/George Harrison	3:35
2.	"Blackbird" (from The Beatles)	Lennon–McCartney	2:32
3.	"Don't Let Me Down" (from Hey Jude)	Lennon–McCartney	3:39
4.	"Something" (from Abbey Road)	Harrison	2:51
5.	"Yesterday" (from Help!)	Lennon–McCartney	2:22
6.	"You've Got to Hide Your Love Away" (from Help!)	Lennon–McCartney	2:58
7.	"Let It Be" (from Let It Be)	Lennon–McCartney	3:48
8.	"She's Leaving Home" (from Sgt. Pepper's Lonely Hearts Club Band)	Lennon–McCartney	3:33
9.	"Imagine" (from John Lennon's Imagine)	John Lennon	3:44
10.	"In My Life" (from Rubber Soul)	Lennon–McCartney	3:00
11.	"While My Guitar Gently Weeps" (from The Beatles)	Harrison	3:24
12.	"Across the Universe" (from No One's Gonna Change Our World)	Lennon–McCartney	3:52
13.	"Hey Jude/The End" (from Hey Jude/Abbey Road)	Lennon–McCartney/Lennon–McCartney	3:52
Total length:			43:14

== Release history ==
Region	Date	Format	Label
Australia	11 April 2014	CD, digital download	Universal Music Australia
