= Shadows (Rachael Leahcar album) =

Studio album by Rachael Leahcar
- Released: 7 April 2017
- Length: 44:55
- Label: FanFare Records

Rachael Leahcar chronology
Here Comes the Sun (2014)	Shadows (2017)	Together For Christmas (2019)

Singles from Shadows
- 1. "Beware the Wolf" Released: 3 February 2017; 2. "What They Don't Tell You" Released: 31 March 2017; 3. "Shadows" Released: 19 October 2017

Shadows is the fourth studio album by Australian recording artist Rachael Leahcar, released on 7 April 2017.

Leahcar said: "I write songs to connect with people and help them through each phase of life, as music has always helped me. Featuring snatches from various genres, I feel I have found my true voice, and I want to share it far and wide." "I wrote most of [the songs] on my beloved piano or guitar, and recorded the vocals at my home studio provided by Greg and Ingrid (ma and pa)."

== Track listing ==
No.	Title	Writer(s)	Length
1.	"No More Little Girl"	Rachael Leahcar; Eli Green	2:27
2.	"Where You Are"	Leahcar	3:04
3.	"Shadows"	Leahcar	4:39
4.	"Sweet Child o' Mine"	Guns N' Roses	4:22
5.	"Sewn"	Leahcar	3:32
6.	"Beware the Wolf"	Leahcar; Green	3:37
7.	"The Air That I Breathe"	Albert Hammond; Mike Hazlewood	4:11
8.	"Taste of the Grapevine"	Leahcar	3:09
9.	"Money Changes Everything"	Tom Gray	4:38
10.	"What They Don't Tell You"	Leahcar; Josh Pyke	3:14
11.	"Somebody to Love"	Darby Slick	3:15
12.	"Little Lady"	Leahcar; Lainie Jamieson	4:42
Total length:			44:55

== Charts ==
Chart (2017)	Peak position
Australian Albums (ARIA)	25

== Release history ==
Region	Date	Format	Label
Australia	7 April 2017	CD, digital download	FanFare
