= Rachael Leahcar =

Australian musician

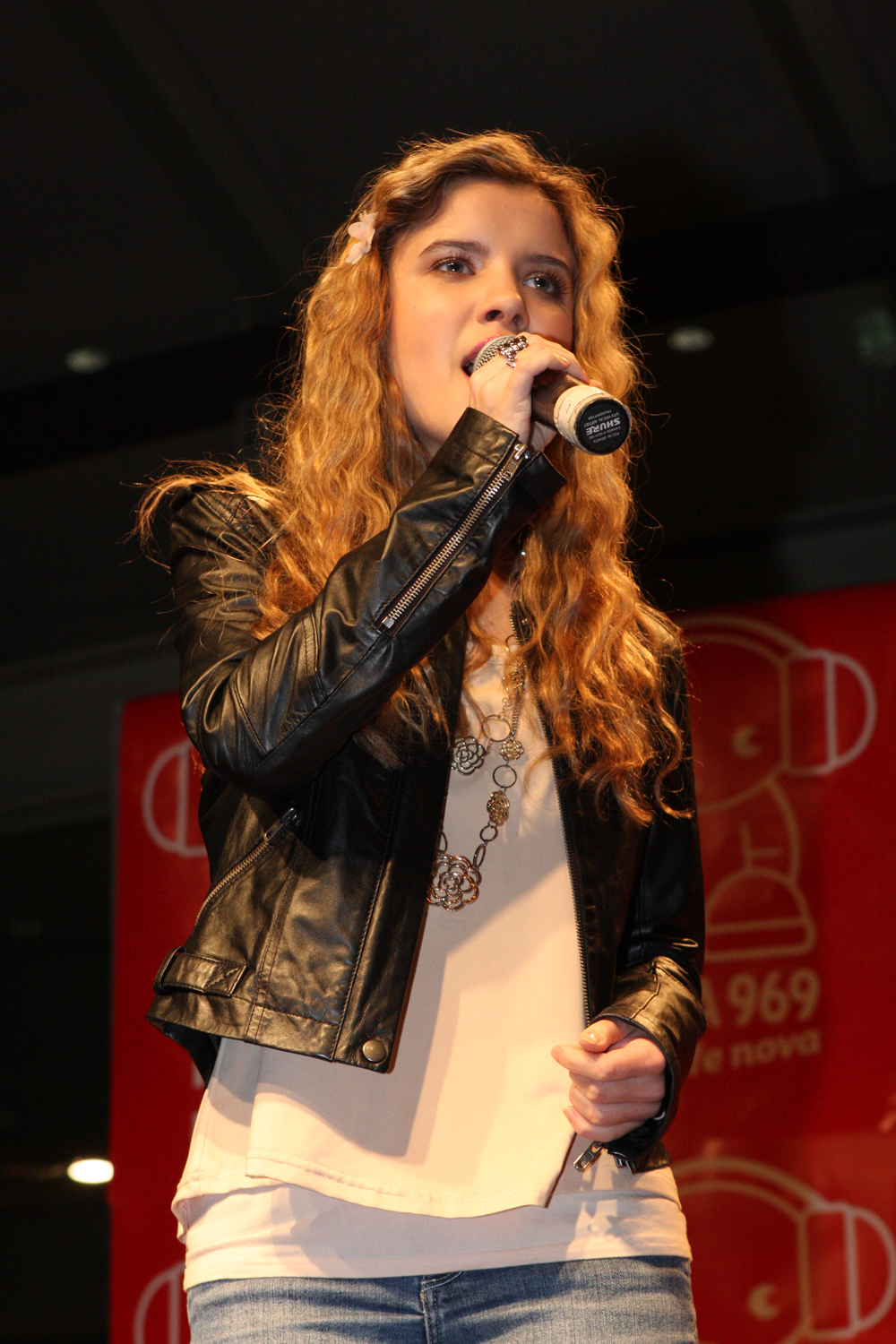
- Leahcar in July 2012

Background information
- Born: Rachael Wendy Bartholomew; 22 February 1994 (age 32)
- Origin: Adelaide, South Australia, Australia
- Genres: Pop, soul, classical
- Occupation: Singer-songwriter
- Instruments: Vocals, piano, flute
- Years active: Since 2012
- Label: Universal
- Website: rachaelleahcar.com.au

Rachael Wendy Bartholomew (born 22 February 1994), known by her stage name Rachael Leahcar, is an Australian singer and songwriter, born and raised in Adelaide, South Australia. She participated on the first season of The Voice Australia, coming in third place. Shortly after, she signed a record deal with Universal Music Australia. Her debut album Shooting Star, which contained songs she performed on The Voice, as well as newly recorded covers, was released on 13 July 2012. The album debuted at number five on the ARIA Albums Chart.

== Life and career ==
=== 1994–2011: Early life ===
Rachael Leahcar (born Rachael Wendy Bartholomew) was born and raised in Adelaide, South Australia (her performing surname is her first name spelled backwards). Leahcar was born with retinitis pigmentosa and (as of 2012) is legally blind with only 10% visual function. She found her love of music at a very early age and has been singing and playing instruments ever since. She started singing lessons at the age of nine and spent a lot of her childhood singing in Italian, a result of spending time with her Italian grandparents. At the age of 12, Leahcar was accepted into the South Australian Public Primary Schools choir. The same year, she auditioned and was accepted into the music program at Brighton Secondary School. Also at the age of 12, she entered Fellini's Search for a Star competition, where she made it through to the grand final and was chosen as one of the top 3 performers of the evening, winning $200 and the judges' encouragement award of $1000 worth of recording time at Quentin Eyres Studio.

In March 2009, at age 15, Leahcar entered and won Dino Prizzi's International Festival of Song competition, winning a return trip to Rome to perform on a RAI Uno television program. She was also invited to perform in Benevento while touring Italy on a television program. Leahcar has also performed professionally at many of the Italian clubs and events in Adelaide, including the 2010 and 2011 Italian Carnevale.

Following this, Leahcar entered and won the Star Life Talent Search competition, where she received a trophy, $500 for her school and $500 in vouchers for herself to spend. One of the judges of the competition was SAFM radio personality, Andrew 'Cosi' Costello, who was so impressed with Leahcar that he asked her to sing her winning song, "Non, je ne regrette rien", on the radio. He was so overwhelmed with her talent that he also asked her to perform at his wedding reception, which she did.

In October 2009, Leahcar released a cover album entitled Rachael's Repertoire, which included ten of her most performed songs at the time. She decided to donate $1 from every copy sold to CanDo4Kids, a charity that has supported her throughout her life. With the success of the first album, a second cover album with ten songs, self-titled Rachael Leahcar, was released shortly afterwards.

In 2011, Leahcar completed year 12 and successfully applied for Speech Pathology at Flinders University, but has since deferred this course to focus on a career in music. Leahcar is also an official ambassador for the Royal Society for the Blind and has since done commercials on the Nine Network.

=== 2012: The Voice Australia, record deal and Shooting Star ===
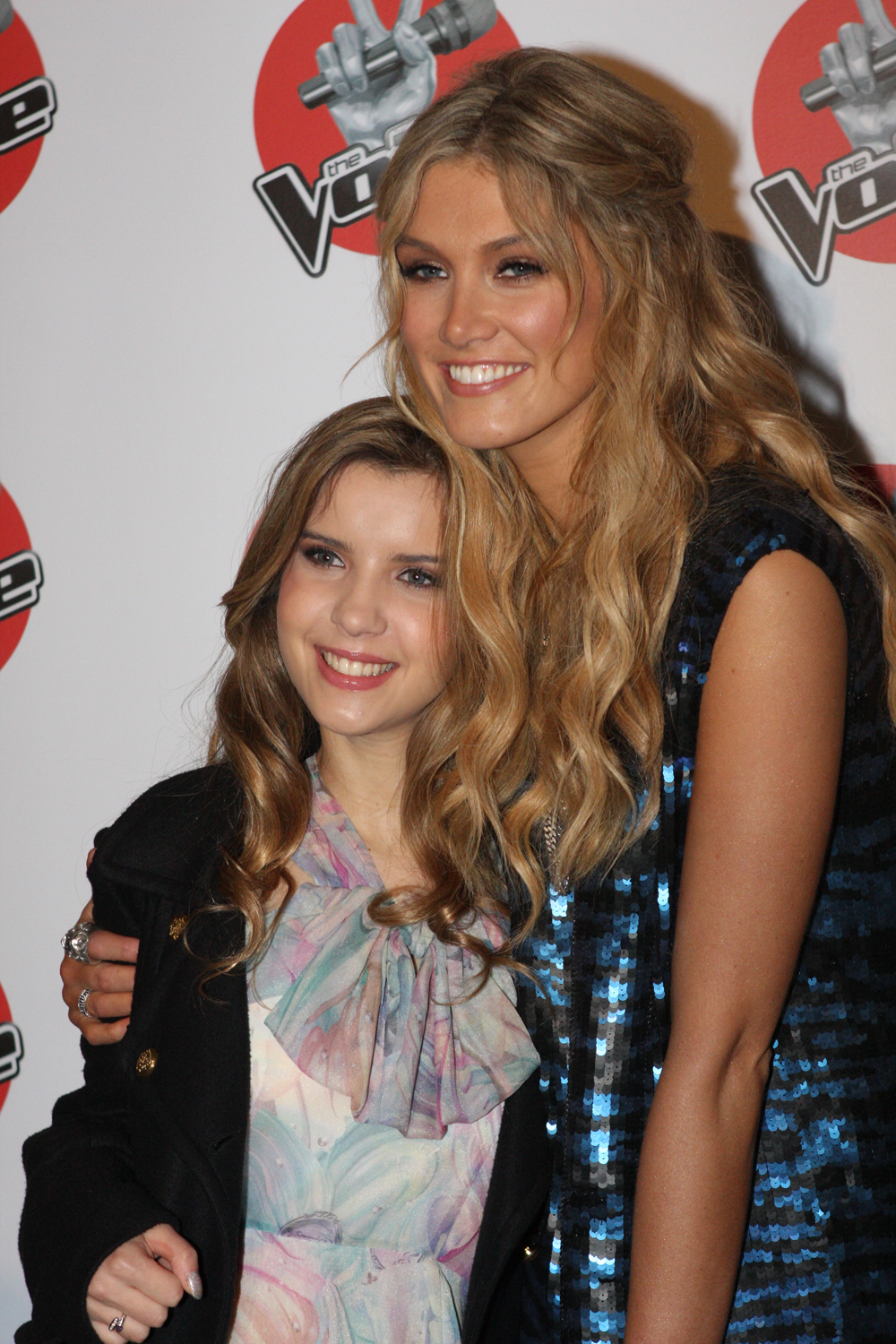
Leahcar with her coach and mentor Delta Goodrem in June 2012.

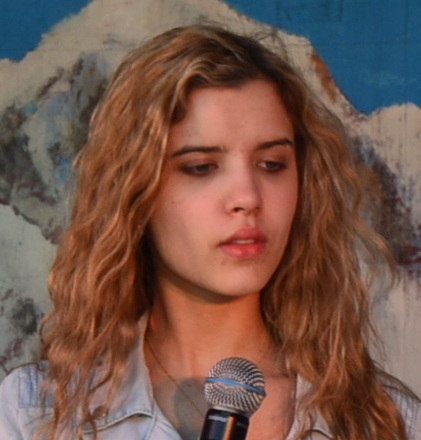
Leahcar at Christmas Carols, Burwood, Sydney in 2012

Leahcar auditioned for the first season of the Australian reality television talent show The Voice Australia. She appeared on the show's second episode on 16 April 2012, singing Edith Piaf's "La Vie en rose". All four coaches turned their chairs and opted to take Leahcar as one of their finalists; she chose Delta Goodrem as her coach and mentor. Leahcar progressed through to the Battle Rounds, where she was paired against contestant Adam Hoek, singing Eva Cassidy's "Over the Rainbow". As a result, Goodrem chose Leahcar as the winner of the battle and she progressed through to the Live Shows. For the first Live Show, Leahcar sang Jewel's "Hands" and progressed through to the Quarter-finals after she was chosen by the public vote. In her second Live Show, she sang the classic song "Someone to Watch Over Me" and she progressed through to the Semi-finals after being selected again by the public. In her third Live Show, she sang "Nights in White Satin (Notte Di Luce)", where she progressed through to the Grand Final after being chosen by Goodrem.

During the first part of the Grand Final, on 17 June 2012, Leahcar sang an original song titled "Shooting Star", which she wrote, and Charlie Chaplin's "Smile". Leahcar placed third in the second part of the Grand Final on 18 June 2012. She was awarded a cash prize of $20,000.

On 26 June 2012, it was announced that Leahcar, along with other The Voice finalists Sarah De Bono and Darren Percival, had been signed to record deals on Universal Music Australia. Leahcar's debut single "Coming Home Again" written by Jud Friedman, which would have been her winner's single, was released digitally on 29 June 2012. Leahcar's debut album, titled Shooting Star, was released on 13 July 2012; it features studio versions of covers she performed on The Voice, original songs, and newly recorded covers of Bette Midler's "The Rose" and the Bee Gees' "Words". Leahcar promoted the album with an in-store appearance at Westfield Marion, Adelaide, where she signed copies of the album and performed "La Vie en rose" and "Shooting Star".

==== Performances ====
Performed	Song	Original artist	Result
Blind Audition	"La Vie en rose"	Édith Piaf	Joined Team Delta
Battle Rounds	"Over The Rainbow" (against Adam Hoek)	Judy Garland	Winner
Live Show Final, Part 1	"Hands"	Jewel	Public vote
Live Show Final, Part 3	"Someone to Watch Over Me"	Barbra Streisand	Public vote
Live Show Final, Part 3	Born to Try (as part of Team Delta)	Delta Goodrem	Public vote
Live Show Final, Part 5	"Nights in White Satin"	The Moody Blues	Delta's choice
The Live Finale, Part 1	"Smile"	Charlie Chaplin	3rd
The Live Finale, Part 1	"Shooting Star"	Rachael Leahcar	3rd
The Live Finale, Part 2	"The Prayer" (with Delta Goodrem)	Celine Dion & Andrea Bocelli	3rd
The Live Finale, Part 2	The Chain	Fleetwood Mac	3rd

Leahcar joined previous The Voice contestants for a one-off charity concert special, Voices Reaching Out, for The Reach Foundation on 12 July 2012. The 90-minute concert aired 15 July 2012 on the Nine Network and was staged at The Palms at Crown complex, where she sang Christina Perri's "A Thousand Years". Shooting Star debuted at number five on the ARIA Albums Chart.

In August 2012, it was announced that Leahcar would be the opening act for Delta Goodrem's An Evening With Delta: The Top of My World Shows tour in October and November 2012.

Leahcar appeared on Noah Stewart's Australian release of his debut album, featuring on a The Sound of Music medley with violinist Sally Cooper, released on 7 September 2012.

=== 2012–2014: Romantique and Here Comes the Sun ===
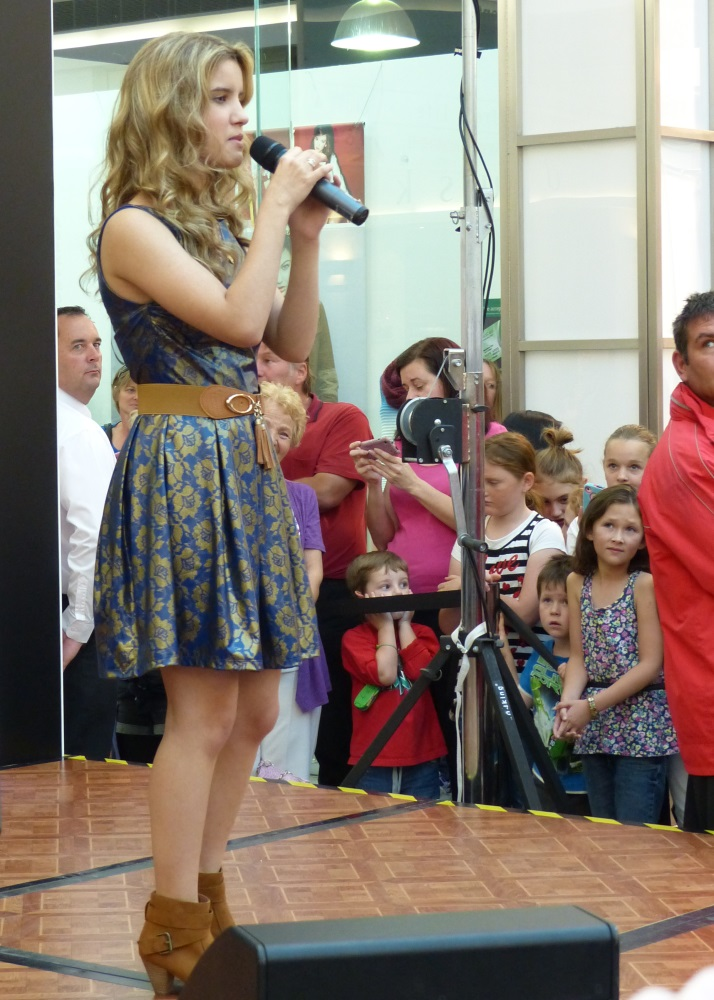
Rachael Leahcar performing at Colonnades Shopping Centre Saturday 27 April 2013

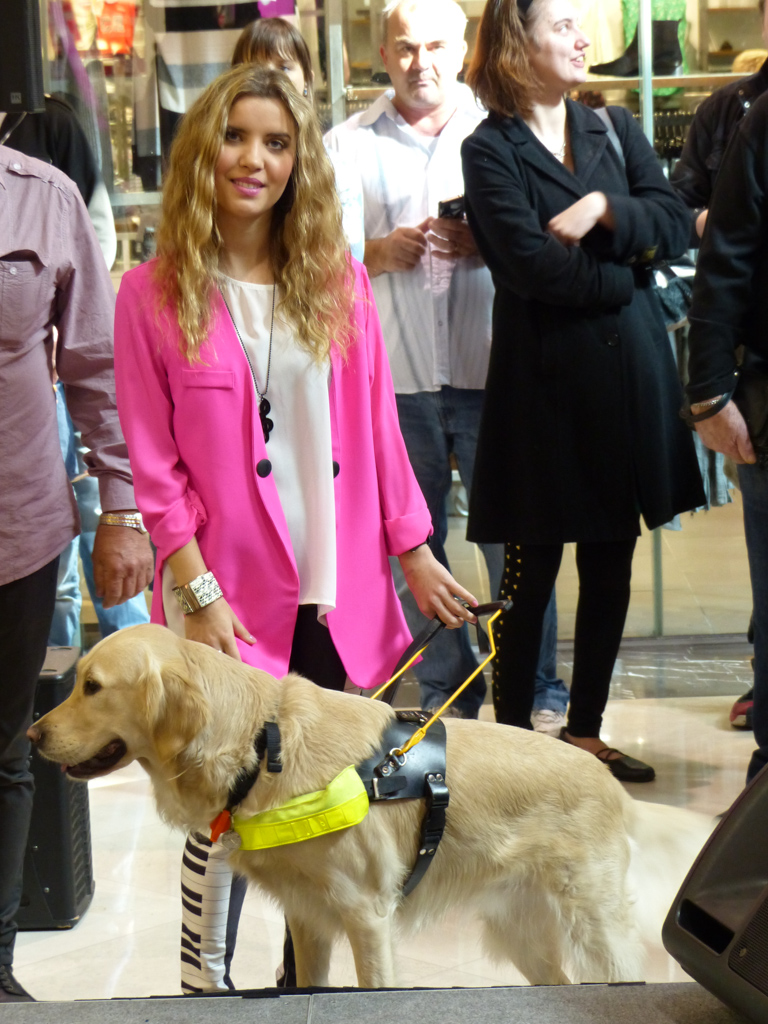
Rachael and Ella at Marion shopping centre 11 May 2014

In July 2012, Leahcar revealed via Facebook she has been writing new music. Leahcar announced via her official website she has been working on a new album, to be released in 2013.

On 24 March 2013, Leahcar via Twitter, announced her second album Romantique, was set to be released on 26 April 2013 and would be followed by a tour. Of recording the album, Leahcar told The Daily Telegraph, "It started off at about 100 songs and was then whittled down to 50 and then I recorded about 20. I'm really happy with the album and my originals. I'm just so excited to show everyone what I've been up to." Romantique is a collection of "contemporary, classic and original songs backed by orchestral instruments". While no singles were released from the album, a music video featuring Leahcar was released for the song "Hearts a Mess".

Leahcar performed at the Sidney Myer Music Bowl for a second time for Carols by Candlelight on 24 December 2013, singing Mariah Carey's "All I Want for Christmas Is You". On 31 March 2014, Leahcar announced details for her third studio album, Here Comes the Sun, a collection of Beatles covers. The album was released on 11 April 2014.

=== Since 2015: Cabaret show, Shadows, tour and Christmas album ===
In April 2014, Leahcar announced she had begun working on her fourth studio album, with hopes to tour in the near future. Leahcar revealed she has been writing with singer-songwriter Josh Pyke, among other artists, for the upcoming album. Leahcar revealed in September 2015, she was writing the album's first single, then "Sewn".

Following the death of Adelaide Crows coach Phil Walsh in July 2015, Leahcar lent her vocals to a tribute song, "We Stand Together (Flying as One)". Written and performed by Adelaide band The BordererS, the song also features Taasha Coates from The Audreys in addition to numerous Crows and Port Adelaide supporters. Leahcar provided her vocals to a song for the South Australian short film project, Maurice's Symphony, titled "Song of Joy". In addition, Leahcar's vocals also feature in the film, Love & Love Only.

Leahcar announced in June 2015, she would be touring a cabaret show, telling her life story, through to her time on The Voice Australia. Titled The Colours of My Life, Leahcar toured various Adelaide suburban arts centres throughout July 2015 and featured Leahcar's RSB guide dog, Ella. These shows continued regionally and nationally until October 2019.

In February 2017, Leahcar released the lead single, "Beware the Wolf", from her fourth studio album Shadows. The album was released 7 April 2017. Leahcar embarked on the Shadows Tour in support of the album in November 2017.

Leahcar released a Christmas album, Together For Christmas on 25 October 2019. The album features duets with Darren Mullan, Ben Whittington, Lara Nakhle, and Grace Bawden.

== Personal life ==
Leahcar completed year 12 in 2011 and successfully applied for Speech Pathology at Flinders University. Leahcar initially deferred the course to focus on her career in music, but began her studies in 2014.

In February 2014, Leahcar completed training with her RSB guide dog, Ella.

Rachael married her longterm boyfriend in 2022

In August 2023 she announced that she is expecting her first child due in December 2023.

== Discography ==
=== Studio albums ===
Title	Album details	Peak chart positions
Title	Album details	AUS
Shooting Star	Released: 13 July 2012; Formats: CD, digital download; Label: Universal Music Australia	5
Romantique	Released: 26 April 2013; Formats: CD, digital download; Label: Universal Music Australia	10
Here Comes the Sun	Released: 11 April 2014; Formats: CD, digital download; Label: Universal Music Australia	38
Shadows	Released: 7 April 2017; Formats: CD, digital download; Label: FanFare	25
Together For Christmas	Released: 25 October 2019; Formats: CD, digital download; Label: RL Music	—

=== Singles ===
Title	Year	Peak chart positions	Album
Title	Year	AUS	Album
"Coming Home Again"	2012	—	Shooting Star
"Beware the Wolf"	2017	—	Shadows
"What They Don't Tell You"	2017	—	Shadows
"Shadows"	2017	—	Shadows
"Ave Maria" (with Lara Nakhle)	2018	—	Together For Christmas
"—" denotes a recording that did not chart.

=== Promotional singles ===
Title	Year	Peak chart positions	Album
Title	Year	AUS	Album
"La Vie en rose"	2012	18	Shooting Star
"Over the Rainbow"	2012	47	Shooting Star
"Hands"	2012	15	Shooting Star
"Someone to Watch Over Me"	2012	41	Shooting Star
"Nights in White Satin (Notte Di Luce)"	2012	43	Shooting Star
"Smile"	2012	34	Shooting Star
"Shooting Star"	2012	31	Shooting Star

== Awards ==
=== South Australian Music Awards ===
The South Australian Music Awards (previously known as the Fowler's Live Music Awards) are annual awards that exist to recognise, promote and celebrate excellence in the South Australian contemporary music industry. They commenced in 2012.

Year	Nominee / work	Award	Result (wins only)
2017	Rachael Leahcar	Most Popular Pop Artist	Won

=== Danny Awards ===
The Danny Awards are an international music competition celebrating musicians with disabilities, recognizing their talent and contributions to the arts. Named after Danny Tisdale, the awards aim to promote inclusivity and accessibility in the music industry.

Rachael Leahcar won a Danny Award at the 5th Danny Awards in 2024, earning recognition for her outstanding musical achievements as a legally blind singer. She also performed at the awards ceremony in New York City at the historic Town Hall, showcasing her talent on an international stage. Her win highlights her dedication to music and advocacy for artists with disabilities.

|}
