= Gems: The Duets Collection =

Album by Michael Bolton

Studio album by Michael Bolton
- Released: June 21, 2011
- Recorded: 2010–2011
- Studio: The Grip, Blackbird Studio and Hound's Ear Studio (Nashville, Tennessee); Lava Room Recording (Cleveland, Ohio); Westlake Studios (Los Angeles, California); Panchathan Hollywood Studios, Dragonfly Studios and Capitol Studios (Hollywood, California); Chartmaker Studios (Malibu, California); Turtle Sound Recording (Winton, Connecticut); The Beach House (Miami Beach, Florida); Ciatec Studios (Rio de Janeiro, Brazil); Studio Guillaume Tell (Paris, France); FunDeMental Studios (Düsseldorf, Germany)
- Genre: Pop
- Length: 50:32 (Standard edition)
- Label: Mointaigne / Legacy / Sony
- Producer: Michael Bolton; Dann Huff; David Foster; A. R. Rahman; Rudy Pérez; Steve Milo

Michael Bolton chronology
One World One Love (2009)	Gems: The Duets Collection (2011)	Ain't No Mountain High Enough: A Tribute to Hitsville U.S.A. (2013)

Professional ratings
Review scores
Source	Rating
AllMusic	3/5 stars
Entertainment Weekly	C+
USA Today	2/4 stars

Gems: The Duets Collection is the 21st studio album by American pop singer Michael Bolton. The album was released on Montaigne Records / Legacy Recordings / Sony Music on 21 June 2011. It features productions by acclaimed songwriters, producers and musicians including A. R. Rahman, David Foster, Dann Huff and Rudy Pérez.

== Track listing ==
Standard edition
No.	Title	Writer(s)	Producer(s)	Length
1.	"Love is Everything" (featuring Rascal Flatts)	Michael Bolton; Gary LeVox; Jay DeMarcus; Joe Don Rooney	Dann Huff	4:35
2.	"Fields of Gold" (featuring Eva Cassidy)	Sting	David Foster	4:13
3.	"Sajna" (featuring A. R. Rahman)	A. R. Rahman; BlaaZé	Rahman	4:11
4.	"Pride (In the Name of Love)" (featuring Anne Akiko Meyers)	Bono; The Edge; Adam Clayton; Larry Mullen Jr.	Huff	4:27
5.	"I'm Not Ready" (featuring Delta Goodrem)	Delta Goodrem; Vince Pizzinga	Huff	4:32
6.	"Over the Rainbow" (featuring Paula Fernandes)	Harold Arlen; E.Y. "Yip" Harburg	Rudy Pérez; Michael Bolton	3:30
7.	"When A Man Loves a Woman / It's a Man's Man's Man's World" (medley) (featuring Seal)	Calvin Houston Lewis; Andrew James Wright; James Brown; Betty Jean Newsome	Foster	5:35
8.	"The Prayer" (featuring Lara Fabian)	David Foster; Carole Bayer Sager	Foster	4:28
9.	"You Are So Beautiful" (featuring Chris Botti)	Billy Preston; Bruce Fisher	Bolton	3:55
10.	"Make You Feel My Love" (featuring Helene Fischer)	Bob Dylan	Bolton	3:15
11.	"Hallelujah" (featuring MB's Children's Choir)	Leonard Cohen	Bolton	3:44
12.	"Steel Bars" (featuring Orianthi)	Dylan; Bolton	Bolton; Steve Milo	4:16

Asian edition
No.	Title	Writer(s)	Producer(s)	Length
1.	"Love is Everything" (featuring Rascal Flatts)	Bolton; LeVox; DeMarcus; Rooney	Huff	4:33
2.	"How Am I Supposed to Live Without You" (featuring Coco Lee)	Bolton; Doug James	Bolton; Milo	4:18
3.	"Fields of Gold" (featuring Eva Cassidy)	Sting	Foster	4:13
4.	"Sajna" (featuring A. R. Rahman)	Rahman; BlaaZé	Rahman	4:11
5.	"Pride (In the Name of Love)" (featuring Anne Akiko Meyers)	Bono; The Edge; Clayton; Mullen Jr.	Huff	4:26
6.	"I'm Not Ready" (featuring Delta Goodrem)	Goodrem; Pizzinga	Huff	4:30
7.	"Over the Rainbow" (featuring Paula Fernandes)	Arlen; Harburg	Pérez; Bolton	3:38
8.	"When A Man Loves a Woman / It's a Man's Man's Man's World" (medley) (featuring Seal)	Lewis; Wright; Brown; Newsome	Foster	5:34
9.	"The Prayer" (featuring Lara Fabian)	Foster; Sager	Foster	4:26
10.	"You Are So Beautiful" (featuring Chris Botti)	Preston; Fisher	Bolton	3:53
11.	"Make You Feel My Love" (featuring Helen Fischer)	Dylan	Bolton	3:14
12.	"Hallelujah" (featuring MB's Children's Choir)	Cohen	Bolton	3:44
13.	"Steel Bars" (featuring Orianthi)	Dylan; Bolton	Bolton; Milo	4:16
14.	"Said I Loved You...But I Lied" (featuring Agnes Monica)	Bolton; Robert Lange	Bolton	5:11

== Personnel ==
- Michael Bolton – vocals
- Charlie Judge – acoustic piano (1), Hammond B3 organ (1), synthesizers (1), keyboards (5, 6), programming (5, 6), strings (6)
- David Foster – keyboards (3)
- A. R. Rahman – all instruments (4)
- Hentry Kuruvila – additional programming (4)
- Robbie Buchanan – acoustic piano (10, 12)
- Vince Pizzinga – acoustic piano (11), programming (11), piano and string arrangements (11)
- Dann Huff – electric guitar (1, 6), acoustic guitar (5), additional electric guitar (5), bouzouki (5)
- Joe Don Rooney – electric guitar (1)
- Eva Cassidy – acoustic guitar (3)
- Sanjeev Thomas – guitars (4)
- Tom Bukovac – electric guitar (5)
- Rudy Pérez – all rhythm guitars (7), nylon guitar fills (7), bass (7), rhythm track arrangements (7)
- Brian Monroney – nylon guitar fills (7)
- Michael Thompson – electric guitars (7), guitars (10, 12), acoustic guitar (11)
- Orianthi – guitars (13)
- Jonathan Yudkin – mandolin (5), violin (5)
- Jay DeMarcus – bass (1)
- Jimmie Lee Sloas – bass (5)
- Chris McHugh – drums (1, 5)
- Dorian Crozier – drums (6)
- Richard Bravo – live drums (7), live percussion (7)
- Chad Wright – drums (12)
- Anne Akiko Meyers – violin (5)
- Chris Botti – trumpet (10)
- Brian BecVar – piano arrangements (12)

Orchestra (Tracks 7, 10 & 12)

- Chris Walden – string arrangements
- Shari Sutcliffe – music contractor
- Belinda Broughton – concertmaster
- Kevin Axt, Charles Nenneker and Ken Wild – double bass
- Matthew Cooker, Vanessa Freebairn-Smith (principal), Dennis Karmazyn, Dane Little, David Speltz and Rudy Stein – cello
- Evan Wilson – viola
- Caroline Campbell, Ron Clark, Mario DeLeon, Joel Derouin, Tiffany Yi Hu, Jennifer Levin, Robin Olson, Sid Page, Joel Pargman, Carol Pool, Michele Richards, Guillermo Romero, Mary Kathleen Sloan, Josefina Vergara, Amy Wickman, Yelena Yegoryan and Shari Zippert – violin

Guest vocalists

- Rascal Flatts (Gary LeVox, Jay DeMarcus and Joe Don Rooney) – vocals (1)
- Coco Lee – vocals (2)
- Eva Cassidy – vocals (3)
- A. R. Rahman – vocals (4)
- Delta Goodrem – vocals (6)
- Paula Fernandes – vocals (7)
- Seal – vocals (8)
- Lara Fabian – vocals (9)
- Helene Fischer – vocals (11)
- Orianthi – vocals (13)
- Agnes Monica – vocals (14)

MB's children choir on "Hallelujah"

- Chris Walden – arrangements
- Scottie Haskell – choir conductor
- Chloe Arzy, Evyn Johnson, Makiah Johnson, Michael Johnson, Angela Marquez, Delany Meyer, Ilsey Moon, Cayla Nisperos, Sabrina Walden and Sasha Walden – singers

== Production ==
- Michael Bolton – executive producer
- Christina Klein – A&R, management
- Chris Biondo – guitar and vocal producer for Eva Cassidy (3)
- Vince Pizzinga – vocal producer for Delta Goodrem (6), original string arrangements (6)
- Mike "Frog" Griffith – production coordinator (1, 5, 6)
- Courtney Blooding – production coordinator (9)
- Clinton Cerejo – vocal arrangements (4)
- Delta Goodrem – original piano arrangements (6)
- Daniel Silveira – musical direction (7)
- Paul Ralphes – vocal coach (7)
- Jaymes Quirino – project coordinator
- Brian Porizek – art direction, design
- Sir Lawrence Alma-Tadena – painting ("Spring")

Technical

- Doug Sax – mastering
- Sangwook Nam – mastering
- The Mastering Lab (Ojai, California) – mastering location
- Drew Bollman – recording (1), recording assistant (5, 6)
- Mark Hagen – recording (1)
- Sean Neff – recording (1)
- Steve Milo – MB vocal recording (1)
- Justin Niebank – mixing (1, 5, 6), recording (5, 6)
- Bobby Campbell – Coco Lee vocal recording (2), digital editing (2, 11), MB vocal recording (6), Agnes Monica vocal recording (14)
- Mick Guzauski – mixing (2, 4, 11, 13, 14)
- Joachem van der Saag – MB vocal recording and engineer (3, 9), mixing (3, 8, 9), recording (8), Lara Fabian vocal recording (9)
- Jorge Vivo – MB vocal recording and engineer (3)
- Chris Biondo – guitar and vocal recording for Eva Cassidy (3)
- Cody Bice – sound engineer (4)
- Tony Joy – sound engineer (4)
- Aditya Modi – sound engineer (4)
- David Reitzas – violin recording for Anne Akiko Meyers (5), MB vocal recording (7, 10), orchestra recording (7, 10, 12), Lara Fabian vocal recording (9), trumpet recording (10), mixing (10, 12), recording (12), guitar recording (13), children's choir recording (12)
- Vince Pizzinga – vocal recording for Delta Goodrem (6)
- Andreas Bermudez – recording (7), mixing (7)
- Miguel Alfanso – vocal recording coordinator for Paula Fernandez (7)
- Guilherme Maderios – vocal recording engineer for Paula Fernandez (7)
- Yves Jaget – Lara Fabian vocal recording (9)
- Alex Alegizakis – piano recording (10, 12)
- Oliver Achatz – MB vocal recording (11)
- Billy Mann – Helene Fischer vocal recording (11)
- Seth Morton – recording assistant (1, 5)
- Taylor Nyquist – recording assistant (1, 6)
- Alejandro Barajas – assistant violin engineer (5)
- Steve Rusch – assistant violin engineer (5)
- David Lopez – assistant engineer (7)
- Chris Brooke – MB vocal recording assistant (7)
- Tiago – Paula Fernandez vocal recording assistant (7)
- Aaron Walk – orchestra recording assistant (7, 10, 12), children's choir recording assistant (12)
- Dann Huff – digital editing (1, 5)
- Brian David Willis – digital editing (1, 5, 12)
