= Julian Karikalan =

Indian born Australian filmmaker

- Born: Madurai, Tamil Nadu, India
- Occupations: Director, Writer, Producer
- Years active: 2015–present

Julian Karikalan is an Indian born Australian filmmaker, known for his feature film Love & Love Only, which is the first English language film for which Ilaiyaraaja has composed original songs.

== Early life and career ==
Karikalan was born in Madurai, Tamil Nadu. He shifted to Australia in 2003.

Karikalan wrote, produced, edited and directed the feature film Love & Love Only, which he completely self-funded through various means. Though the film was made on a microbudget, he managed to rope in composer Ilaiyaraaja, to compose the songs and score for the film. Though Ilaiyaraaja has scored for more than 1000 films in various Indian languages, 'Love and Love Only' is the first English film for which he has composed original songs.

Love & Love Only is a cross-cultural romantic drama between a working class Australian girl and an international student from India, set in contemporary Australia. Julian experimented a new production methodology with a shoestring budget, and a minimal crew which included his whole family, to make this feature film. The film won him the award for 'Best Direction' at the International Film and Entertainment Festival of Australia in 2015.

His next film was the queer-based film Let's Go Below the Rainbow, which he made as a one-person crew all by himself apart from the music director Ilaiyaraaja.

== Filmography ==
=== As director, producer, writer, and editor ===
Year	Title	Director	Producer	Writer	Editor	Notes	Ref.
2015	Love & Love Only	Yes	Co-producer	Yes	Yes		
2023	Let's Go Below the Rainbow	Yes	Yes	Yes	Yes	Won–Amsterdam International Film Festival for Best LGBTQ Feature Film; Won–Oz International Film Festival for Best LGBTQ Feature; Also cinematographer, art director, production manager, sound designer, and visual effects coordinator	
