= Child of the Universe (album) =

Studio album by Delta Goodrem
- Released: 26 October 2012
- Recorded: 2008–12
- Studio: 301 Studios and Sony Music Studios (Sydney, Australia); Doug Brady Music (Melbourne, Australia); Cake Sounds and RAK Studios (London, UK); Kensaltown Recording Studios (West London, UK); Capitol Studios and Henson Recording Studios (Hollywood, California, USA); Larrabee Sound Studios (North Hollywood, California, USA); Human Feel Studios and The Rockpool (Los Angeles, California, USA); Dragonfly Studios (Haymarket, Virginia, USA); Little Big Sound (Nashville, Tennessee, USA); Parhelion Recording Studios (Atlanta, Georgia, USA); Indian River Studios (Merritt Island, Florida, USA)
- Genre: Pop rock; power pop
- Length: 60:21
- Label: Sony
- Producer: Steve Booker; Chris Braide; Gary Clark; Vince Pizzinga; John Shanks; Martin Terefe

Delta Goodrem chronology
Delta (2007)	Child of the Universe (2012)	Christmas (2012)

Singles from Child of the Universe
- 1. "Sitting on Top of the World" Released: 13 April 2012; 2. "Dancing with a Broken Heart" Released: 10 August 2012; 3. "Wish You Were Here" Released: 12 October 2012

Child of the Universe is the fourth studio album by Australian singer–songwriter Delta Goodrem. It was released on 26 October 2012 by Sony Music Entertainment. The album was preceded by its three singles "Sitting on Top of the World", "Dancing with a Broken Heart" and "Wish You Were Here". The album debuted at number two on the ARIA Albums Chart and was certified Gold by the Australian Recording Industry Association for shipments of 35,000 copies.

== Background ==
"I've done a 360 back to where I started, but hopefully it's more evolved. I feel I've stepped up my game. I'm experimenting with different chord changes and different areas of music. I feel I can do anything on this album, I'm relishing that. I feel like the sky's the limit but at the same time it's very raw."

— Goodrem speaking about her fourth studio album Child of the Universe."

The album was originally in pre-production and writing stages in 2008 while Goodrem was in the United States, and was expected to be released in 2010 at some point. Commenting on the album in 2010, Goodrem said "What resonates with me now is the acoustic guitar and piano. I'm enjoying writing songs that are more stripped back. "I've done a 360 back to where I started, but hopefully it's more evolved. I feel I've stepped up my game. I'm experimenting with different chord changes and different areas of music. I feel I can do anything on this album, I'm relishing that. I feel like the sky's the limit but at the same time it's very raw." However, after some personal issues and moving countries the album was delayed. Goodrem said the album would be out "soon" and eventually said it would be out in late 2011. The album was again pushed back and said to be out early 2012. Although this didn't happen due to her role as a coach on The Voice Australia. The album was made available to stream in full through iTunes for free on 19 October 2012 and officially released a week later on 26 October 2012 in Australia and New Zealand on 9 November. The release of the album was almost exactly five years since her previous studio release, Delta, which was released on 20 October 2007. A theme present in this album is will to survive, rediscovering yourself and fighting for love and happiness in yourself.

== Release and promotion ==
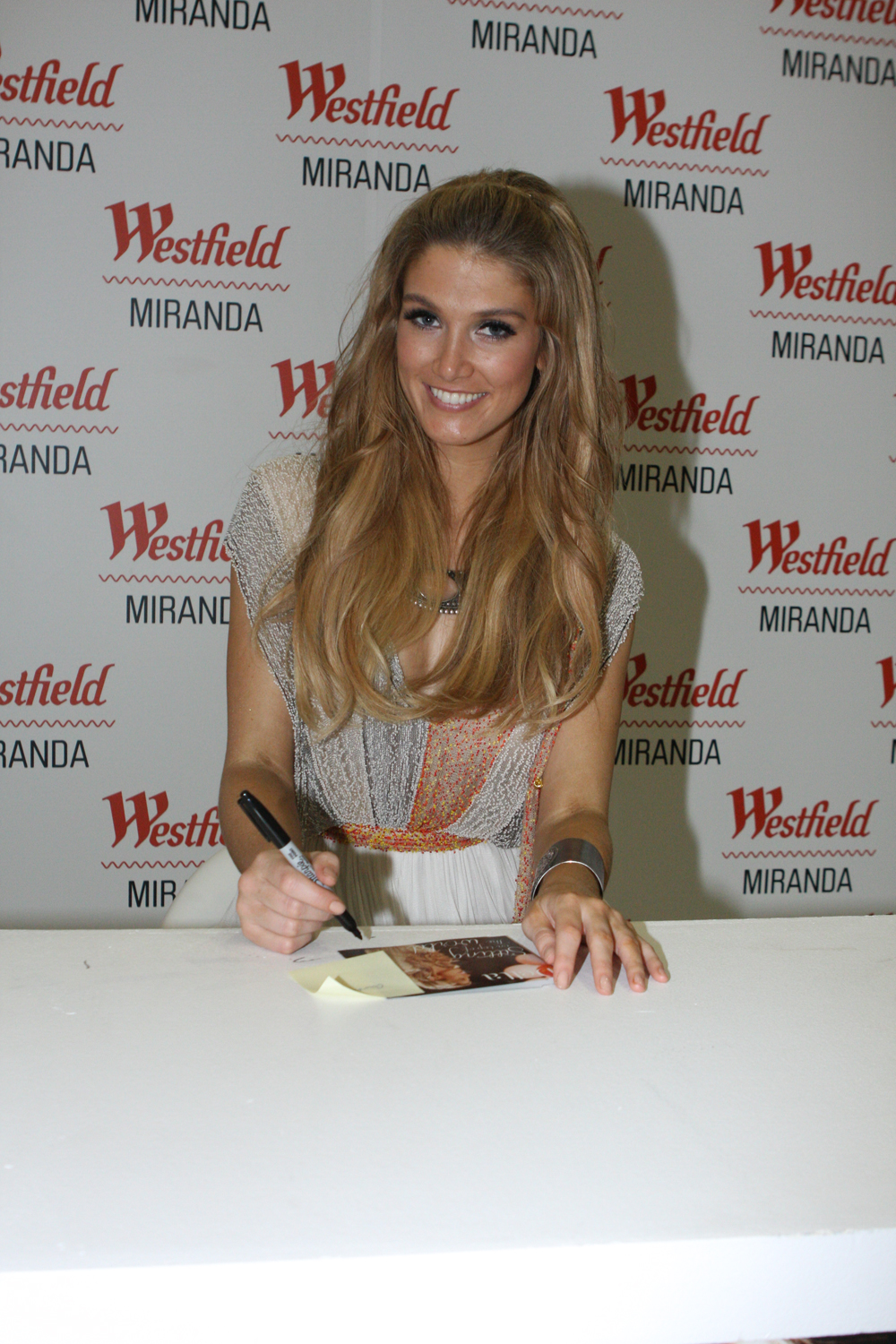
Goodrem signing at Miranda Westfield during promotion in Australia

"Child of the Universe" was released digitally and physically on 26 October 2012 in Australia. That night Goodrem appeared on Australian TV program A Current Affair to promote the album. She performed "Wish You Were Here" and "Predictable". On 29 October 2012 Goodrem appeared on Australian morning TV program Sunrise. She performed songs including "Sitting on Top of the World" and "Wish You Were Here". She also performed a mash up of songs "Out of the Blue" and "Be Strong" from her second album Mistaken Identity. Goodrem did an interview on 5 November 2012 on nightly chat program The Project. The next day Goodrem appeared at the Melbourne Cup. After finishing her tour Goodrem flew to New Zealand to do promotion after the album was released there on 9 November 2012. After doing various breakfast morning TV interviews, radio interviews and a small show for her fans, Goodrem performed "Wish You Were Here" on New Zealand's Got Talent. After returning to Australia she appeared on Australian morning television show Mornings, singing "Wish You Were here" to promote the album. She then performed "Sitting on Top of the World" on the season final of Australia's Funniest Home Videos.

=== Singles ===
"Sitting on Top of the World" was released to radio on 5 April 2012 and released digitally and physically on 13 April 2012. The song reached number two on the ARIA Singles Chart and was certified double Platinum by the Australian Recording Industry Association for selling 140,000 copies. This became her first multi-platinum certified single since "Predictable" in 2003. It also charted on the New Zealand Singles Chart at number 23. The song also went to Number One in Greece.

"Dancing with a Broken Heart" was released to radio on 26 July 2012, released digitally on 10 August 2012 as the second single from Child of the Universe and debuted and peaked at number 15 on the ARIA Singles Chart.

"Wish You Were Here" was released to radio on 4 October 2012 and released on 12 October 2012 as the third single. It debuted on the ARIA Singles Chart at number seven and later peaked at number five. It was certified Platinum for selling 70,000 copies. It also became her fourth chart-topping single in Sweden.

=== An Evening with Delta: The Top of My World Shows ===
An Evening with Delta: The Top of My World Shows
- Tour by Delta Goodrem
- Associated album: Child of the Universe
- Start date: 27 October 2012
- End date: 8 November 2012
- Legs: 1
- No. of shows: 5

Delta Goodrem concert chronology
- Believe Again Tour (2009); An Evening with Delta: The Top of My World Shows (2012); Wings of the Wild Tour (2016)

To promote Child of the Universe, Goodrem embarked on her third concert tour titled "An Evening with Delta: The Top of My World Shows". The tour visited Brisbane, Sydney and Melbourne. Goodrem chose The Voice Australia finalist, Rachael Leahcar, as her support act.

==== Set list ====
1. "Sitting on Top of the World"
2. "Born to Try"
3. "Lost Without You"
4. "Safe to Believe"
5. "Possessionless"
6. "Touch"
7. "Bare Hands" / "Throw it Away"
8. "Out of the Blue" / "Be Strong"
9. "Knocked Out"
10. "Innocent Eyes" / "Mistaken Identity"
11. "Kissing You"
12. "I'm Not Ready"
13. "Hunters and the Wolves"
14. "Dancing with a Broken Heart"
15. "Believe Again" / "Last Night on Earth"
16. "Hypnotized" / "The Rockafeller Skank"
17. "Predictable"
18. "Wish You Were Here"
19. "Wonderwall" / "In This Life"
20. "The Prayer"
21. "Not Me, Not I"

==== Tour dates ====
Date	City	Country	Venue
27 October 2012	Brisbane	Australia	Brisbane Convention & Exhibition Centre
31 October 2012	Sydney	Australia	State Theatre
2 November 2012	Sydney	Australia	State Theatre
7 November 2012	Melbourne	Australia	Hamer Hall
8 November 2012	Melbourne	Australia	Hamer Hall

== Critical reception ==
Tania Zeine from ARIA mentioned how the time off between albums allowed Goodrem to compose one of her greatest albums yet. They also praised Goodrem's "diversity of style and genre with her tracks" and that she "shows off vocally with her broad range of soulful harmonies and Christina Aguilera like power solos." Emily Booth from The AU Review rated the album 7.8/10. She noted highlights of the album include Child of the Universe, Touch, Hunters and the Wolves in which she noted that it was "excellently produced and wildly atmospheric and arguably the best track on the album", and Control. However she did point out that "Dancing with a Broken Heart" is still one of the weakest songs of her career. Booth said that, "The best thing about the new record is the diversity of styles, because she can really show off her best asset, from the rock-tinged vocals on 'When My Stars Come Out' to the Mariah Carey-style harmonies on 'Safe to Believe'. There are plenty of songs which pay their respects to her musical roots, for the fans of her older stuff, but Delta has always had a versatile voice."

=== Accolades ===
The album's first single "Sitting on Top of the World" was nominated for Song of the Year at the ARIA Music Awards of 2012, but lost to "Brother" by Matt Corby. Sitting on Top of the World also gained two nominations at the 2013 APRA Awards. The first was for "Pop Work of the Year" and the second being for "Most Played Australian Work". However the winner of both awards was Timomatic for Set it Off.

== Commercial performance ==
The album debuted at number two on the Australian ARIA Albums Chart on 4 November 2012 with 16,000 copies sold. Goodrem was denied a fourth straight number one album by Taylor Swift who sold around 21,000 copies of her album Red. The next week Child of the Universe dropped one spot to number three but suffered big drops the next two weeks, dropping to number thirteen then number twenty four. It rose to number fifteen in its fifth week in Australia. In New Zealand the album debuted at number eighteen and then dropped to number twenty six the next week. Overall it spent three weeks on the New Zealand Albums Chart. Child of the Universe spent ten weeks in the Australian top fifty.

== Track listing ==
Standard edition
No.	Title	Writer(s)	Producer(s)	Length
1.	"Child of the Universe"	Delta Goodrem, Gary Clark	Clark	4:13
2.	"Touch"	Goodrem, Clark	Clark	4:21
3.	"Wish You Were Here"	Goodrem, Clark	Clark	4:36
4.	"Knocked Out"	Goodrem, Vince Pizzinga, Clark	Clark	3:50
5.	"Sitting on Top of the World"	Goodrem, John Shanks	Shanks	3:58
6.	"I'm Not Ready"	Goodrem, Pizzinga	Pizzinga	4:49
7.	"Hunters and the Wolves"	Goodrem, Pizzinga, Eric Rosse	Chris Braide	3:29
8.	"Dancing with a Broken Heart"	Goodrem, Pizzinga, Shanks	Shanks	3:48
9.	"Hypnotized"	Goodrem, Pizzinga, Shanks	Shanks	3:43
10.	"Safe to Believe"	Goodrem, Clark, Pizzinga, Nick Jonas	Pizzinga	4:38
11.	"The Speed of Life"	Goodrem, Clark	Braide	3:38
12.	"War on Love"	Goodrem, Shanks	Shanks	3:49
13.	"I Lost All Love 4 You"	Goodrem, Martin Terefe	Terefe	3:50
14.	"When My Stars Come Out"	Goodrem, Clark, Olivia Waithe	Steve Booker	3:30
15.	"Control"	Goodrem, Clark	Braide	4:02
Total length:				60:21

iTunes bonus tracks
No.	Title	Writer(s)	Producer(s)	Length
16.	"Alcohol"	Goodrem, Clark, Robert Conley	Clark	3:52
17.	"No Communication"	Goodrem, Clark	Clark	4:00
Total length:				68:13

Deluxe edition bonus disc – The Acoustic Sessions
No.	Title	Writer(s)	Length
1.	"Child of the Universe"	Goodrem, Clark	3:29
2.	"Touch"	Goodrem, Clark	4:09
3.	"Wish You Were Here"	Goodrem, Clark	4:20
4.	"Hunters and the Wolves"	Goodrem, Pizzinga, Rosse	3:07
5.	"Safe to Believe"	Goodrem, Clark, Pizzinga, Jonas	4:37
6.	"Sitting on Top of the World"	Goodrem, Shanks	3:48
7.	"The Speed of Life"	Goodrem, Clark	3:49
8.	"Hypnotized"	Goodrem, Pizzinga, Shanks	4:01
9.	"War on Love"	Goodrem, Shanks	4:31
10.	"Knocked Out"	Goodrem, Pizzinga, Clark	3:47
11.	"Dancing with a Broken Heart"	Goodrem, Pizzinga	3:57
Total length:			43:40

== B-sides ==
The following tracks were not released on the album, but were released on the singles.

Title	Single(s)
Uncovered	"Sitting on Top of the World"
Waiting For Forever	"Dancing with a Broken Heart"
Rise	"Wish You Were Here"
Daughter	"Wish You Were Here"
Heart Hypnotic	Bonus single after album was released, not included in next album.

== Personnel ==
- Delta Goodrem – vocals, backing vocals (1–6, 8, 9, 12–14), acoustic piano (1, 3–6, 8–11, 13, 14), electric piano (2), choir arrangements (10)
- Gary Clark – programming (1, 2, 4), Mellotron (1), guitars (1, 2, 4), synth bass (1, 2, 4), synthesizers (2), bass (3), bowed bass (3), bells (3), percussion (4)
- Chris Braide – grand piano (7, 11, 15), synthesizers (7, 11, 15), acoustic guitar (7, 11, 15), electric guitar (7, 11, 15), drum programming (7, 11, 15), string arrangements (7, 11, 15)
- John Shanks – acoustic piano (9), organ (9), synthesizers (9), acoustic guitar (9, 12), electric guitar (9), bass (9, 12), keyboards (12), percussion (12)
- Dan Chase – keyboards (9, 12), programming (9), drums (9), synthesizers (12)
- Charlie Judge – keyboards (12), synth strings (12)
- Paul Lamalfa – programming (12)
- Nikolaj Torp Larsen – acoustic piano (13), organ (13)
- Martin Terefe – synthesizers (13), acoustic guitar (13), bass (13), drums (13)
- Sam Keyte – programming (13)
- Steve Booker – keyboards (14), programming (14), guitars (14)
- Rob "Smit" Smith – additional programming (14)
- Mick Skelton – drums (1), percussion (1, 3), additional drums (2), orchestral drums (3)
- Matt Laug – drums (3)
- Derrick McKenzie – drums (14)
- Victor Indrizzo – percussion (9)
- Vince Pizzinga – rhythm cello (1), programming (10), bass guitar (10), cello (10)
- Stan Carrizosa – choir (10)
- Jherimi Leigh – choir (10)
- Maiya Sykes – choir (10)

String section (Tracks 1 & 3)

- Vince Pizzinga – string arrangements
- Sally Brown, Karol Kowalik and Paul Stender – cello
- Thomas Chawner, Mandy Murphy and Luke Spicer – viola
- Anne Marie Braid, Dimitri Calligeros, Martyn Hentschel, Daniel Kowalik, Jemima Littlemore, Tracy Lynch and Michele O'Young – violin

The Love Sponge Strings (Track 13)

- John Catchings – cello
- Kristin Wilkinson – viola
- David Angell – violin
- David Davidson – violin, string arrangements

Production

- Delta Goodrem – executive producer
- Gary Clark – producer (1–4), vocal producer (14)
- John Shanks – producer (5, 8, 9, 12)
- Vince Pizzinga – producer (6, 10)
- Chris Braide – producer (7, 11, 15)
- Martin Terefe – producer (13)
- Steve Booker – producer (14)
- Sheri Sutcliffe – production coordinator (8, 9, 12), music contractor (9, 12)

Technical

- Leon Zervos – mastering at 301 Studios
- Simon Todkill – drum recording (1, 2), string recording (1), orchestral percussion recording (3), piano recording (6), additional engineer (14)
- Mark Endert – mixing (1–3)
- Tom Weir – drum recording (3)
- Braddon Williams – piano and vocal recording (4)
- Gary Clark – mixing (4)
- Manny Marroquin – mixing (5, 8, 9)
- Vince Pizzinga – vocal recording (6), additional vocal recording (10)
- Doug Brady – mixing (6)
- Chris Braide – engineer (7, 11, 15), mixing (7, 11, 15)
- Dan Chase – recording (8, 9, 12)
- Paul Lamalfa – recording (8, 9, 12)
- Lars Fox – Pro Tools editing (9)
- Steve Genewick – engineer (10)
- Miles Walker – mixing (10, 12, 14)
- Sam Keyte – recording (13)
- Baeho "Bobby" Shin – string recording (13)
- Thomas Juth – mixing (13)
- Rob "Smit" Smith – engineer (14)
- Mike Horner – additional recording (9)
- Jonathan Baker – second engineer (1–4, 6)
- Doug Johnson – mix assistant (1–3)
- Murray Sheridan – second engineer (4)
- Chris Galland – mix assistant (5, 8, 9)
- Chandler Harrod – second engineer (10)
- Luke Campolieta – assistant engineer (10, 12, 14)
- Antonio Rizzello – assistant engineer (14)

=== Personnel (The Acoustic Sessions) ===
Musicians

- Delta Goodrem – vocals, backing vocals, acoustic piano
- Adam Sofo – keyboards, acoustic piano
- Michael Dolce – guitars, musical director
- Warren Trout – percussion
- Vince Pizzinga – cello (1–10)
- Thomas Dethlefs – violin

Production

- Delta Goodrem – producer
- Vince Pizzinga – co-producer, vocal engineer, mixing (11)
- Simon Todkill – engineer (1–10), mixing (1, 2, 4–7, 10)
- Chandler Harrod – engineer (11)
- Doug Brady – mixing (1, 3, 8, 9)
- Jonathan Baker – second engineer (1–10)

== Charts ==
=== Weekly charts ===
Chart (2012)	Peak position
Australian Albums (ARIA)	2
Australian Artist Albums Chart (ARIA)	1
New Zealand Albums (RMNZ)	18

=== Year-end charts ===
Chart (2012)	Position
Australian Albums Chart	46
Australian Artist Albums Chart	9

== Certifications ==
Region	Certification	Certified units/sales
Australia (ARIA)	Gold	35,000^{^}
^{^} Shipments figures based on certification alone.

== Release history ==
Region	Date	Format	Edition(s)	Label	Catalogue
Australia	26 October 2012	CD; digital download	Standard; deluxe	Sony Music Australia	88691936482
New Zealand	26 October 2012	Digital download	Standard	Sony Music Australia	88691936482
Hong Kong	31 October 2012	CD	Standard; deluxe	Sony Music Australia	88691936482
Singapore	6 November 2012	CD	Standard; deluxe	Sony Music Australia	88691936482
New Zealand	9 November 2012	CD	Standard; deluxe	Sony Music Australia	88691936482
Malaysia	23 November 2012	CD	Standard; deluxe	Sony Music Australia	88691936482
Taiwan	14 December 2012	CD	Deluxe	Sony Music Australia	88691936482
Australia	20 December 2012	Digital download	Deluxe	Sony Music Australia	88691936482
New Zealand	20 December 2012	Digital download	Deluxe	Sony Music Australia	88691936482
Thailand	20 December 2012	Digital download	Deluxe	Sony Music Australia	88691936482
Australia	26 January 2024	2×LP	Silver Vinyl	Sony Music Australia	MOVLP3283
