= Love & Love Only =

2015 Australian film

- Promotional Poster
- Directed by: Julian Karikalan
- Written by: Julian Karikalan
- Produced by: Julian Karikalan; Esh Julian
- Starring: Rohit Kalia; Georgia Nicholas
- Cinematography: Dion Wilton
- Edited by: Julian Karikalan
- Music by: Ilaiyaraaja
- Production company: JUVI Films
- Release date: 13 August 2015 (San Francisco Global Movie Festival)
- Running time: 130 minutes
- Country: Australia
- Language: English

Love & Love Only is a 2015 Australian film directed, co-produced, written and edited by Indian-born Australian filmmaker Julian Karikalan starring Rohit Kalia and Georgia Nicholas in the lead roles.

A cross-cultural romantic film where an Indian falls in love with an Australian girl features background score and songs by India's composer Ilaiyaraaja. This is the first-ever English-language feature film for which he has composed original songs. (Note: Although Ilaiyaraaja previously composed for the Indian animated English film Pandavas: The Five Warriors (2000), that film only featured an original score and no songs.)

The film was launched for online audience on 22 November 2016 and is available on YouTube in countries that allow paid content, while for the rest of the world, the movie is available on Vimeo on demand and VHX.

In 2017, the film's screenplay was published as a book.

== Synopsis ==
Krishna "Kris" is forcefully sent to Australia by his parents from India to learn business and life, but he struggles to adapt to Australian ways as he was always pampered by his mom. In Australia, he falls in love with Stacey, his co-worker, a school dropout from a broken family. Krishna's struggle with cultural differences create problems in their relationship.

== Cast ==
- Rohit Kalia as Kris
- Georgia Nicholas as Stacey
- Sekhar Mehta as Arvind
- Ambika Asthana as Kannika
- Murthy Vaitheeswaran as Raghu
- Robert Osborne as George
- Ben Cork as Lecturer James
- Shashidhar Dandekar as Rajan
- Suparna Malik as Chitra
- Anton Manojkumar as Joe
- Laurence Nath as Kumar
- Anamika Dhawan as Deepa

== Production ==
"Love is a universal feeling, [...] Though the perception of Love differs across cultures, the deeper emotions and the need for love are universal throughout the human race. This film deals with those deeper needs and the effects of true love, from a cross-cultural perspective. If you love romance and beautiful music, this film will entrance you; its magic is universal.

— Karikalan on the film's theme, 2016

=== Development and casting ===
The film's title is based on the book Love and Love Only, which features in Aniyathipraavu (1997). The Tamil remake of that film, Kadhalukku Mariyadhai (1997), also featured music by Ilaiyaraaja. The film is about the love between a Punjabi man and an Australian woman. The origin for the film came when the director Julian Karikalan was teased by a Turkish girl while working in IKEA, who said that she loved him as a joke. For this film, Karikalan considered the perspective of what if she was serious about her proposal and modified her character to be Australian. Karikalan also co-produced the film along with his wife. Rohit Kalia, who was Mr. India Australia in 2014, was selected to play the lead alongside Georgia Nicholas, who was chosen from a list of extras. The rest of the cast is from theatre and made their film debut. Karikalan's children also feature in the film in cameo roles.

=== Music ===
Contrary to regular industry practice, the composer of the film came aboard only after the whole film was edited and ready for a preliminary viewing. Once the film was complete, Julian Karikalan, who was a fan of Ilaiyaraaja, made a trip to India to meet him. Ilaiyaraaja consented to support the project.

Being an English film, the composer Ilaiyaraaja was keen in getting native western voices. After advertising online in Australia, Rachael Leahcar, the South Australian singer was chosen to render her voice for the first ever song composed by Ilaiyaraaja for an English film. The background tracks were recorded in Prasad Studios, Chennai and the voice was recorded and mixed in Australia. Ilaiyaraaja was initially set to composed only three songs while Brent Heber, who worked as the sound designer, was to compose the background music. Ilaiyaraaja eventually composed 21 tracks for the film.

=== Filming ===
The film was shot in the Sydney metropolitan area and was additionally shot at the University of Wollongong. While filming at the Sydney Murugan Temple, the scenes were shot from outside as filming was prohibited inside.

== Music ==
Love & Love Only

Soundtrack album by Ilaiyaraaja
- Released: 3 May 2016
- Genre: Feature film soundtrack
- Length: 1:05:44
- Language: English
- Label: Juvi Digital Co

Ilaiyaraaja chronology
Kida Poosari Magudi (2016)	Love & Love Only (2016)	Amma Kanakku (2016)
External audio
- Love & Love Only – Jukebox on YouTube

Singles from Love & Love Only
- 1. "Am I in Love?" Released: 14 February 2015

The music was composed by Ilaiyaraaja. The lyrics are written by Julian Karikalan and Denny Burgess. Ramya NSK also features as a playback singer for the album.

Track listing
No.	Title	Singer(s)	Length
1.	"The First Song"	Rachael Leahcar	3:37
2.	"Shock of a Lifetime"	—	0:43
3.	"Dad Makes a Deal"	—	1:48
4.	"The Australian Job"	—	2:15
5.	"The First Day Out"	—	0:49
6.	"A Silverlining"	—	2:59
7.	"The First Night Out"	—	2:38
8.	"A Walk in the Moonlight"	—	4:41
9.	"Kris Goes into Hiding"	—	4:14
10.	"Stacey's Confrontation"	—	1:51
11.	"Stacey's Perseverance"	—	4:04
12.	"The Night Together"	—	4:28
13.	"Am I in Love?"	Rachael Leahcar	3:51
14.	"Kris Plans Ahead"	—	6:21
15.	"Love" (The Indian Way)	—	4:24
16.	"A Surprise Proposal"	—	2:10
17.	"Lovers Discord"	—	3:13
18.	"Pain of Separation"	—	2:16
19.	"Stacey's Realisation"	—	2:54
20.	"An Indian Waltz" (Painful Joy)	—	4:15
21.	"An Indian Waltz" (Bliss)	—	2:13
Total length:			1:05:44

== Accolades ==
Award (Note: Awards, festivals and organizations are in alphabetical order.)	Date of ceremony (Note: Date is linked to the article about the awards held that year, wherever possible.)	Category	Recipient(s)	Result	Ref.
International Film and Entertainment Festival of Australia	December 2014	Best Musical Score	Ilaiyaraaja	Won	
International Film and Entertainment Festival of Australia	December 2014	Best Direction	Julian Karikalan	Won	
San Francisco Global Movie Festival	August 2015	—N/a	Love & Love Only	Selected	
