= Romantique =

Studio album by Rachael Leahcar
- Released: 26 April 2013
- Genre: Pop
- Length: 45:59
- Label: Universal

Rachael Leahcar chronology
Shooting Star (2012)	Romantique (2013)	Here Comes the Sun (2014)

Romantique is the second studio album by Australian recording artist Rachael Leahcar, who finished third on the first season of The Voice Australia. The album was released on 26 April 2013, through Universal Music Australia and peaked at number 10 on the ARIA Charts, becoming Leahcar second top ten album.

== Track listing ==
No.	Title	Writer(s)	Length
1.	"Hearts a Mess"	Gotye	4:08
2.	"Use Somebody"	Caleb Followill; Nathan Followill; Jared Followill; Matthew Followill	3:27
3.	"Michicant"	Justin Vernon	3:04
4.	"Chasing Pavements"	Adele Adkins	3:35
5.	"La Mer"	Charles Trenet	3:29
6.	"I Go to Sleep"	Ray Davies	2:57
7.	"Wonderful World"	Bob Thiele; George David Weiss	2:30
8.	"Angel"	Sarah McLachlan	4:37
9.	"Limit to Your Love"	Leslie Feist; Chilly Gonzales	4:12
10.	"It Might Be You"	Leahcar	3:15
11.	"Les Feuilles Mortes (Autumn Leaves)"	Jacques Prévert	3:02
12.	"Oh Mama"	Leahcar	3:23
13.	"Suzanna's Song (Little Lady)"	Leahcar	4:14
Total length:			45:59

== Charts ==
=== Weekly charts ===
Chart (2013)	Peak position
Australian Albums (ARIA)	10

=== Year-end charts ===
Chart (2013)	Rank
Australian Artist Albums Chart	38

== Release history ==
Region	Date	Format	Label
Australia	26 Apr 2013	CD, digital download	Universal Music Australia
