= I'm Not Ready (Michael Bolton song) =

Single by Michael Bolton featuring Delta Goodrem

from the album Gems
- Released: 16 May 2011
- Recorded: 2011
- Genre: Pop
- Length: 4:29
- Label: Montaigne Records, Sony Music
- Songwriters: Vince Pizzinga, Delta Goodrem
- Producer: Dann Huff

Michael Bolton singles chronology
"Jack Sparrow" (2011)	"I'm Not Ready" (2011)	"Song of Love for Lindsey" (2016)

Delta Goodrem singles chronology
"Mistakes" (2010)	"I'm Not Ready" (2011)	"Sitting on Top of the World" (2012)

Audio video
- "I'm Not Ready" on YouTube

"I'm Not Ready" is the first single released from Michael Bolton's twenty-first studio album, Gems. It features Australian singer-songwriter Delta Goodrem on vocals. The song was released on iTunes on 16 May 2011 and peaked at number 29 on the US Adult Contemporary chart. Goodrem's original solo recording was released on her fourth studio album, Child of the Universe, the following year.

== Background ==
Goodrem wrote the song about her recent split from fiancé Brian McFadden. Lyrics include "I’m scared of tomorrow and the emptiness to come, but I’ve changed for the better since I’ve known your love."

Bolton got a call from his label and was introduced to Goodrem. Goodrem played the song to Bolton who requested this song be included on his near complete album to which Goodrem agreed.

== Promotion ==
Bolton and Goodrem performed the song live on the American television series Dancing With The Stars on May 10, and again on NBC's Today Show on June 20.

== Reception ==
Brendon Veevers of Renowned for Sound said the song is “both sentimental and vulnerable” and is 'harmony heaven' as the pair pass vocals from one another with ease.

Simon Gage of the Daily Express simply called the song “beautiful”.

== Chart performance ==
Chart (2011)	Peak position
US Adult Contemporary Chart	29
