= Sitting on Top of the World (Delta Goodrem song) =

Single by Delta Goodrem

from the album Child of the Universe
- B-side: "Uncovered"
- Released: 13 April 2012
- Recorded: 2011
- Genre: Power pop
- Length: 3:57
- Label: Sony
- Songwriters: Delta Goodrem; John Shanks
- Producer: John Shanks

Delta Goodrem singles chronology
"I'm Not Ready" (2011)	"Sitting on Top of the World" (2012)	"Dancing with a Broken Heart" (2012)

Music video
- "Sitting on Top of the World" on YouTube

"Sitting on Top of the World" is a song by Australian pop singer and songwriter Delta Goodrem. It was sent to Australian contemporary hit radio on 5 April 2012. "Sitting on Top of the World" was released physically and digitally on 13 April 2012. It peaked at No. 2 on the ARIA Singles Chart and marked the return of Goodrem to multi-platinum certified singles since "Predictable" in 2003.

== Background and composition ==
The release of "Sitting on Top of the World" was much anticipated. This was mostly due to the four years since Goodrem's last solo single, "I Can't Break It to My Heart" (2008). "Sitting on Top of the World" is about Goodrem "feeling like herself" again and feeling connected to the world through music/friendship.

"Sitting on Top of the World" was written by Goodrem and co-written and produced by John Shanks. Lyrically, it talks about stars aligning and being together as one. "So get up, stand up / What you waiting for?" she happily commands. "We gotta live life, give in to begin / We've got a love like no one knows!" she sings on the power pop track.

== Reception ==
Brad Stern wrote for an MTV Buzzworthy article that the song is "a swoon-filled, carefree pop ditty." In another review, Stern wrote for MuuMuse that "probably the most fun, feel good, warm 'n' fuzzy on the inside bout of euphoria you'll feel since that last time you were tripping out on MDMA." He also praised her "sublime vocals", the "powerhouse instrumentation" and called it "an absolutely massive smash." In Australia, "Sitting on Top of the World" debuted and peaked at number two on the ARIA Charts, being held off the top spot by Carly Rae Jepsen's "Call Me Maybe". It was certified double platinum by the Australian Recording Industry Association (ARIA) for shipments of 140,000 copies. In New Zealand, the song debuted at number 38 and moved to number 23 in its second week.

=== Controversy ===
A striking similarity between "Sitting on Top of the World" and Arcade Fire's song "Rebellion (Lies)" was noted by some in the Australian media.

== Promotion ==
=== Music video ===
The official music video for "Sitting on Top of the World" was released on 6 April 2012 on Vevo. It is set in various places in Melbourne, Australia. It is mostly a continuation on the ideas Goodrem used in the "A Little Too Late", "In This Life" and "Out of the Blue" music videos of her posing and dancing with her friends and playing her piano in somewhat a clever way and otherwise dancing in a hippie style. Goodrem herself stated in the behind-the-scenes video on YouTube that it is about how you may get distracted from your main focus in life, but you will always end up where you belong in the end. About "seeing signs, wanting to be in the right place at the right time". The balloons symbolise various paths she has taken over her own life and listeners have taken in their own lives.

The video features Goodrem and a lot of dancers twirling around in a giant field like fanciful forest creatures while holding balloons. At one point, she plays a piano while standing in black stilettos and wearing a bedazzled leather jacket. Brad Stern from MTV News wrote that the video "is equally amazing, featuring Goodrem and a troupe of happy-go-lucky ladies and gents dancing around with balloons in hands."

=== Live performances ===
Goodrem performed "Sitting on Top of the World" for the first time during the Logie Awards on 15 April 2012. The singer made several instore appearances to promote the single in Melbourne, Newcastle, Sydney and Queensland. She also performed "Sitting on Top of the World" on the Today show and then performed the single and "In This Life" at the first round of the 2012 State of Origin series.

== Awards ==
"Sitting on Top of the World" was nominated for Song of the Year at the 2012 ARIA Music Awards.

== Track listings ==
- Digital download
1. "Sitting on Top of the World" – 3:57
- CD single
1. "Sitting on Top of the World" – 3:57
2. "Uncovered" – 4:02
- Digital EP
1. "Sitting on Top of the World" – 3:57
2. "Uncovered" – 4:02
3. "Sitting on Top of the World" (7th Heaven Club Mix) - 7:42
4. "Sitting on Top of the World" (7th Heaven Radio Edit) - 4:12

== Charts ==
=== Weekly charts ===
Chart (2012)	Peak position
Australia (ARIA)	2
New Zealand (Recorded Music NZ)	23

=== Year-end charts ===
Chart (2012)	Position
Australia (ARIA)	49

== Certifications ==
Region	Certification	Certified units/sales
Australia (ARIA)	3× Platinum	210,000^{‡}
^{‡} Sales+streaming figures based on certification alone.

== Release history ==
Country	Date	Label	Format
Australia	5 April 2012	Sony Music Australia	Airplay
Australia	13 April 2012	Sony Music Australia	CD single, digital download
New Zealand	13 April 2012	Sony Music Australia	Digital download
