= Royal Society for the Blind =

South Australian not-for-profit organisation

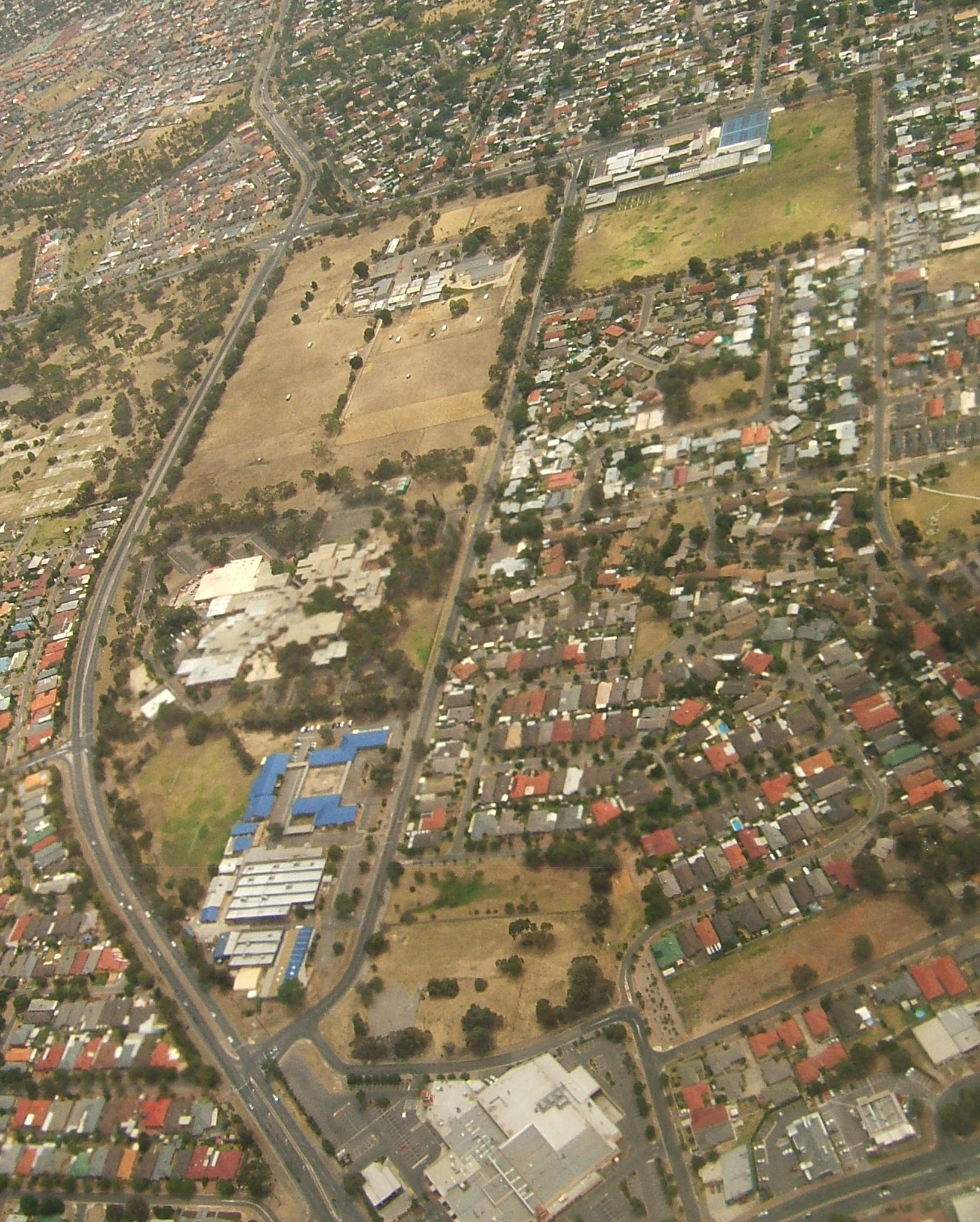
Aerial image of western part of Gilles Plains, looking north. The blue and white buildings further down are the property of the Royal Society for the Blind.

See Differently with the Royal Society for the Blind, formerly the Royal Society for the Blind (RSB), Institute for the Blind, and Royal Institute for the Blind, is a not-for-profit organisation providing services to South Australians who are blind or vision impaired.

== History ==
The RSB was founded by Andrew Whyte Hendry (who was blinded as a child) and Sir Charles Goode in 1884, as the Institute for the Blind when they started an industrial school. It became the Royal Institute for the Blind in 1903.

In 1915, Hendry organised a new building to be built opposite the Women's & Children's Hospital on King William Street, Adelaide.

In 1934, the Royal Institute was incorporated under an Act of the South Australian Parliament.

In 1972 the Royal Institute moved to larger premises in Gilles Plains, and changed its name to Royal Society for the Blind by an Act of Parliament in 1974.

During the 1990s, regional offices were opened in Mount Gambier, Port Augusta, and Noarlunga, and in the 2000s, Elizabeth and Victor Harbor. In 2006 the RSB Guide Dog service was introduced.

In 2013, RSB opened its first interstate office in the Hunter Valley of New South Wales, and became a registered National Disability Insurance Scheme provider in that state.

In 2019, RSB and Vision Australia entered into an agreement allowing Vision Australia to provide services to RSB clients in New South Wales and the Australian Capital Territory. This was the result of a decision by the RSB to focus on its activities in South Australia.

In 2022, RSB rebranded to its new name, See Differently with the Royal Society for the Blind.

== Recognition ==
- 2017: 5-star rating by the Government of South Australia, for success in placing people who are blind or vision impaired into mainstream employment
- 2018: Good Design Australia award (Gold) in the design strategy category for the RSB Innovation Hub project

== RSB NSW ==
The Royal Blind Society of New South Wales was constituted by the Royal Blind Society of New South Wales Act 1901, the predecessor of the Royal Blind Society of New South Wales. The Royal Blind Society (Merger) Act 2005 repealed the Royal Blind Society (Corporate Conversion) Act 2003, and the NSW and its related agencies' bequests and donations would go to Vision Australia.
